= Solar eclipse of July 1, 2057 =

Future annular solar eclipse

- Annular eclipse
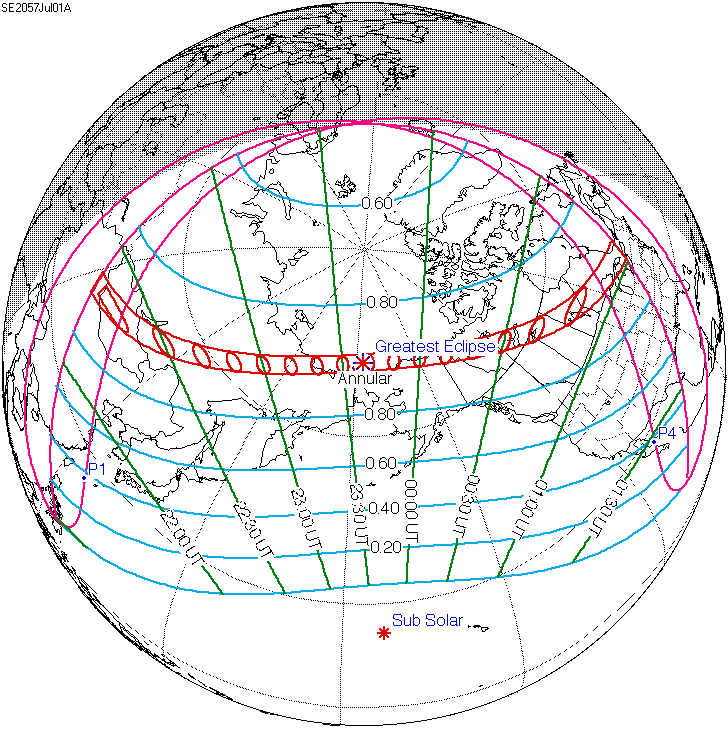
- Map
- Gamma: 0.7455
- Magnitude: 0.9464

Maximum eclipse
- Duration: 263 s (4 min 23 s)
- Coordinates: 71.5°N 176.2°W
- Max. width of band: 298 km (185 mi)

Times (UTC)
- Greatest eclipse: 23:40:15

References
- Saros: 147 (25 of 80)
- Catalog # (SE5000): 9635

An annular solar eclipse will occur at the Moon's ascending node of orbit between Sunday, July 1 and Monday, July 2, 2057, with a magnitude of 0.9464. A solar eclipse occurs when the Moon passes between Earth and the Sun, thereby totally or partly obscuring the image of the Sun for a viewer on Earth. An annular solar eclipse occurs when the Moon's apparent diameter is smaller than the Sun's, blocking most of the Sun's light and causing the Sun to look like an annulus (ring). An annular eclipse appears as a partial eclipse over a region of the Earth thousands of kilometres wide. Occurring about 1.7 days after apogee (on June 30, 2057, at 6:30 UTC), the Moon's apparent diameter will be smaller.

The path of annularity will be visible from parts of northwest China, Mongolia, eastern Russia, northern Alaska, western and central Canada, and far northeast Minnesota, northern Michigan, and far western New York in the United States. A partial solar eclipse will also be visible for parts of East Asia, Northeast Asia, Northern Europe, and North America.

== Eclipse details ==
Shown below are two tables displaying details about this particular solar eclipse. The first table outlines times at which the Moon's penumbra or umbra attains the specific parameter, and the second table describes various other parameters pertaining to this eclipse.

July 1, 2057 Solar Eclipse Times
Event	Time (UTC)
First Penumbral External Contact	2057 July 1 at 20:57:37.1 UTC
First Umbral External Contact	2057 July 1 at 22:18:26.2 UTC
First Central Line	2057 July 1 at 22:21:42.3 UTC
First Umbral Internal Contact	2057 July 1 at 22:25:03.1 UTC
Greatest Duration	2057 July 1 at 23:39:32.9 UTC
Greatest Eclipse	2057 July 1 at 23:40:15.3 UTC
Equatorial Conjunction	2057 July 1 at 23:41:59.0 UTC
Ecliptic Conjunction	2057 July 1 at 23:49:02.6 UTC
Last Umbral Internal Contact	2057 July 2 at 00:55:27.3 UTC
Last Central Line	2057 July 2 at 00:58:47.1 UTC
Last Umbral External Contact	2057 July 2 at 01:02:02.1 UTC
Last Penumbral External Contact	2057 July 2 at 02:22:50.7 UTC

July 1, 2057 Solar Eclipse Parameters
Parameter	Value
Eclipse Magnitude	0.94638
Eclipse Obscuration	0.89564
Gamma	0.74551
Sun Right Ascension	06h46m13.5s
Sun Declination	+23°00'23.1"
Sun Semi-Diameter	15'43.9"
Sun Equatorial Horizontal Parallax	08.6"
Moon Right Ascension	06h46m10.1s
Moon Declination	+23°40'36.4"
Moon Semi-Diameter	14'44.6"
Moon Equatorial Horizontal Parallax	0°54'06.5"
ΔT	88.8 s

== Eclipse season ==
This eclipse is part of an eclipse season, a period, roughly every six months, when eclipses occur. Only two (or occasionally three) eclipse seasons occur each year, and each season lasts about 35 days and repeats just short of six months (173 days) later; thus two full eclipse seasons always occur each year. Either two or three eclipses happen each eclipse season. In the sequence below, each eclipse is separated by a fortnight.

Eclipse season of June–July 2057
June 17 Descending node (full moon)	July 1 Ascending node (new moon)
Partial lunar eclipse Lunar Saros 121	Annular solar eclipse Solar Saros 147

== Related eclipses ==
=== Eclipses in 2057 ===
- A total solar eclipse on January 5.
- A partial lunar eclipse on June 17.
- An annular solar eclipse on July 1.
- A partial lunar eclipse on December 11.
- A total solar eclipse on December 26.

=== Metonic ===
- Preceded by: Solar eclipse of September 12, 2053
- Followed by: Solar eclipse of April 20, 2061

=== Tzolkinex ===
- Preceded by: Solar eclipse of May 20, 2050
- Followed by: Solar eclipse of August 12, 2064

=== Half-Saros ===
- Preceded by: Lunar eclipse of June 26, 2048
- Followed by: Lunar eclipse of July 7, 2066

=== Tritos ===
- Preceded by: Solar eclipse of August 2, 2046
- Followed by: Solar eclipse of May 31, 2068

=== Solar Saros 147 ===
- Preceded by: Solar eclipse of June 21, 2039
- Followed by: Solar eclipse of July 13, 2075

=== Inex ===
- Preceded by: Solar eclipse of July 22, 2028
- Followed by: Solar eclipse of June 11, 2086

=== Triad ===
- Preceded by: Solar eclipse of August 31, 1970
- Followed by: Solar eclipse of May 3, 2144

=== Solar eclipses of 2054–2058 ===
This eclipse is a member of a semester series. An eclipse in a semester series of solar eclipses repeats approximately every 177 days and 4 hours (a semester) at alternating nodes of the Moon's orbit.

The partial solar eclipses on March 9, 2054 and September 2, 2054 occur in the previous lunar year eclipse set, and the partial solar eclipses on May 22, 2058 and November 16, 2058 occur in the next lunar year eclipse set.

Solar eclipse series sets from 2054 to 2058
Ascending node			Descending node		
Saros	Map	Gamma	Saros	Map	Gamma
117	August 3, 2054 Partial	−1.4941	122	January 27, 2055 Partial	1.155
127	July 24, 2055 Total	−0.8012	132	January 16, 2056 Annular	0.4199
137	July 12, 2056 Annular	−0.0426	142	January 5, 2057 Total	−0.2837
147	July 1, 2057 Annular	0.7455	152	December 26, 2057 Total	−0.9405
157	June 21, 2058 Partial	1.4869			

=== Saros 147 ===
This eclipse is a part of Saros series 147, repeating every 18 years, 11 days, and containing 80 events. The series started with a partial solar eclipse on October 12, 1624. It contains annular eclipses from May 31, 2003 through July 31, 2706. There are no hybrid or total eclipses in this set. The series ends at member 80 as a partial eclipse on February 24, 3049. Its eclipses are tabulated in three columns; every third eclipse in the same column is one exeligmos apart, so they all cast shadows over approximately the same parts of the Earth.

The longest duration of annularity will be produced by member 38 at 9 minutes, 41 seconds on November 21, 2291. All eclipses in this series occur at the Moon’s ascending node of orbit.

Series members 11–32 occur between 1801 and 2200:
11	12	13
January 30, 1805	February 11, 1823	February 21, 1841
14	15	16
March 4, 1859	March 15, 1877	March 26, 1895
17	18	19
April 6, 1913	April 18, 1931	April 28, 1949
20	21	22
May 9, 1967	May 19, 1985	May 31, 2003
23	24	25
June 10, 2021	June 21, 2039	July 1, 2057
26	27	28
July 13, 2075	July 23, 2093	August 4, 2111
29	30	31
August 15, 2129	August 26, 2147	September 5, 2165
32
September 16, 2183

=== Metonic series ===
The metonic series repeats eclipses every 19 years (6939.69 days), lasting about 5 cycles. Eclipses occur in nearly the same calendar date. In addition, the octon subseries repeats 1/5 of that or every 3.8 years (1387.94 days). All eclipses in this table occur at the Moon's ascending node.

21 eclipse events between July 1, 2000 and July 1, 2076
July 1–2	April 19–20	February 5–7	November 24–25	September 12–13
117	119	121	123	125
July 1, 2000	April 19, 2004	February 7, 2008	November 25, 2011	September 13, 2015
127	129	131	133	135
July 2, 2019	April 20, 2023	February 6, 2027	November 25, 2030	September 12, 2034
137	139	141	143	145
July 2, 2038	April 20, 2042	February 5, 2046	November 25, 2049	September 12, 2053
147	149	151	153	155
July 1, 2057	April 20, 2061	February 5, 2065	November 24, 2068	September 12, 2072
157
July 1, 2076

=== Tritos series ===
This eclipse is a part of a tritos cycle, repeating at alternating nodes every 135 synodic months (≈ 3986.63 days, or 11 years minus 1 month). Their appearance and longitude are irregular due to a lack of synchronization with the anomalistic month (period of perigee), but groupings of 3 tritos cycles (≈ 33 years minus 3 months) come close (≈ 434.044 anomalistic months), so eclipses are similar in these groupings.

Series members between 1801 and 2200
June 16, 1806 (Saros 124)	May 16, 1817 (Saros 125)	April 14, 1828 (Saros 126)	March 15, 1839 (Saros 127)	February 12, 1850 (Saros 128)
January 11, 1861 (Saros 129)	December 12, 1871 (Saros 130)	November 10, 1882 (Saros 131)	October 9, 1893 (Saros 132)	September 9, 1904 (Saros 133)
August 10, 1915 (Saros 134)	July 9, 1926 (Saros 135)	June 8, 1937 (Saros 136)	May 9, 1948 (Saros 137)	April 8, 1959 (Saros 138)
March 7, 1970 (Saros 139)	February 4, 1981 (Saros 140)	January 4, 1992 (Saros 141)	December 4, 2002 (Saros 142)	November 3, 2013 (Saros 143)
October 2, 2024 (Saros 144)	September 2, 2035 (Saros 145)	August 2, 2046 (Saros 146)	July 1, 2057 (Saros 147)	May 31, 2068 (Saros 148)
May 1, 2079 (Saros 149)	March 31, 2090 (Saros 150)	February 28, 2101 (Saros 151)	January 29, 2112 (Saros 152)	December 28, 2122 (Saros 153)
November 26, 2133 (Saros 154)	October 26, 2144 (Saros 155)	September 26, 2155 (Saros 156)	August 25, 2166 (Saros 157)	July 25, 2177 (Saros 158)
June 24, 2188 (Saros 159)	May 24, 2199 (Saros 160)			

=== Inex series ===
This eclipse is a part of the long period inex cycle, repeating at alternating nodes, every 358 synodic months (≈ 10,571.95 days, or 29 years minus 20 days). Their appearance and longitude are irregular due to a lack of synchronization with the anomalistic month (period of perigee). However, groupings of 3 inex cycles (≈ 87 years minus 2 months) comes close (≈ 1,151.02 anomalistic months), so eclipses are similar in these groupings.

Series members between 1801 and 2200
December 9, 1825 (Saros 139)	November 20, 1854 (Saros 140)	October 30, 1883 (Saros 141)
October 10, 1912 (Saros 142)	September 21, 1941 (Saros 143)	August 31, 1970 (Saros 144)
August 11, 1999 (Saros 145)	July 22, 2028 (Saros 146)	July 1, 2057 (Saros 147)
June 11, 2086 (Saros 148)	May 24, 2115 (Saros 149)	May 3, 2144 (Saros 150)
April 12, 2173 (Saros 151)		
