= Solar eclipse of November 2, 1910 =

20th-century partial solar eclipse

- Partial eclipse
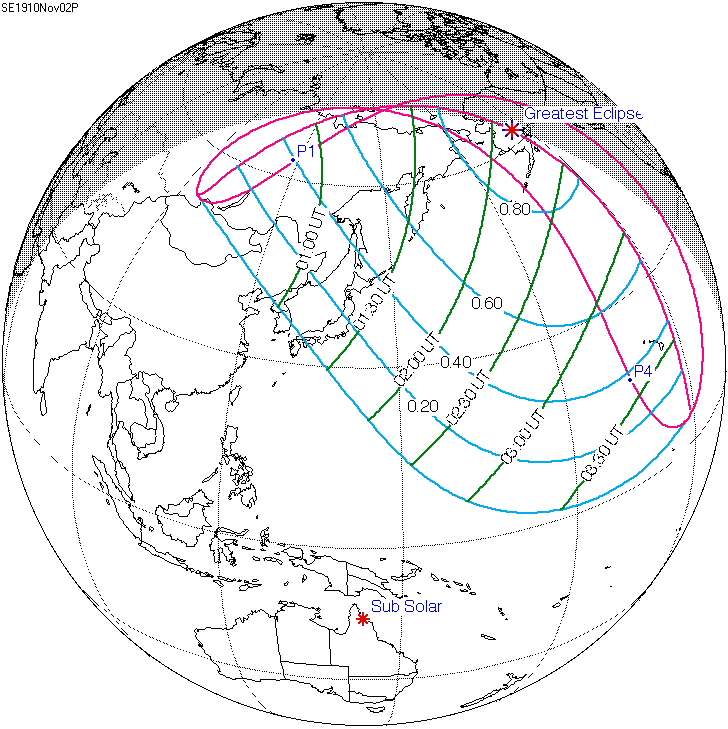
- Map
- Gamma: 1.0603
- Magnitude: 0.8515

Maximum eclipse
- Coordinates: 61.9°N 155.1°W

Times (UTC)
- Greatest eclipse: 2:08:32

References
- Saros: 122 (52 of 70)
- Catalog # (SE5000): 9305

A partial solar eclipse occurred at the Moon's descending node of orbit between Tuesday, November 1 and Wednesday, November 2, 1910, with a magnitude of 0.8515. A solar eclipse occurs when the Moon passes between Earth and the Sun, thereby totally or partly obscuring the image of the Sun for a viewer on Earth. A partial solar eclipse occurs in the polar regions of the Earth when the center of the Moon's shadow misses the Earth.

A partial eclipse was visible for parts of Northeast Asia, Alaska, and Hawaii.

== Eclipse details ==
Shown below are two tables displaying details about this particular solar eclipse. The first table outlines times at which the Moon's penumbra or umbra attains the specific parameter, and the second table describes various other parameters pertaining to this eclipse.

November 2, 1910 Solar Eclipse Times
Event	Time (UTC)
First Penumbral External Contact	1910 November 1 at 23:51:03.2 UTC
Equatorial Conjunction	1910 November 2 at 01:11:30.1 UTC
Ecliptic Conjunction	1910 November 2 at 01:56:01.9 UTC
Greatest Eclipse	1910 November 2 at 02:08:31.5 UTC
Last Penumbral External Contact	1910 November 2 at 04:26:24.7 UTC

November 2, 1910 Solar Eclipse Parameters
Parameter	Value
Eclipse Magnitude	0.85150
Eclipse Obscuration	0.77819
Gamma	1.06031
Sun Right Ascension	14h25m34.9s
Sun Declination	-14°26'06.8"
Sun Semi-Diameter	16'07.3"
Sun Equatorial Horizontal Parallax	08.9"
Moon Right Ascension	14h27m11.9s
Moon Declination	-13°34'00.0"
Moon Semi-Diameter	14'44.0"
Moon Equatorial Horizontal Parallax	0°54'04.4"
ΔT	11.3 s

== Eclipse season ==
This eclipse is part of an eclipse season, a period, roughly every six months, when eclipses occur. Only two (or occasionally three) eclipse seasons occur each year, and each season lasts about 35 days and repeats just short of six months (173 days) later; thus two full eclipse seasons always occur each year. Either two or three eclipses happen each eclipse season. In the sequence below, each eclipse is separated by a fortnight.

Eclipse season of November 1910
November 2 Descending node (new moon)	November 17 Ascending node (full moon)
Partial solar eclipse Solar Saros 122	Total lunar eclipse Lunar Saros 134

== Related eclipses ==
=== Eclipses in 1910 ===
- A total solar eclipse on May 9.
- A total lunar eclipse on May 24.
- A partial solar eclipse on November 2.
- A total lunar eclipse on November 17.

=== Metonic ===
- Preceded by: Solar eclipse of January 14, 1907
- Followed by: Solar eclipse of August 21, 1914

=== Tzolkinex ===
- Preceded by: Solar eclipse of September 21, 1903
- Followed by: Solar eclipse of December 14, 1917

=== Half-Saros ===
- Preceded by: Lunar eclipse of October 27, 1901
- Followed by: Lunar eclipse of November 7, 1919

=== Tritos ===
- Preceded by: Solar eclipse of December 3, 1899
- Followed by: Solar eclipse of October 1, 1921

=== Solar Saros 122 ===
- Preceded by: Solar eclipse of October 20, 1892
- Followed by: Solar eclipse of November 12, 1928

=== Inex ===
- Preceded by: Solar eclipse of November 21, 1881
- Followed by: Solar eclipse of October 12, 1939

=== Triad ===
- Preceded by: Solar eclipse of January 1, 1824
- Followed by: Solar eclipse of September 2, 1997

=== Solar eclipses of 1910–1913 ===
This eclipse is a member of a semester series. An eclipse in a semester series of solar eclipses repeats approximately every 177 days and 4 hours (a semester) at alternating nodes of the Moon's orbit.

The partial solar eclipse on August 31, 1913 occurs in the next lunar year eclipse set.

Solar eclipse series sets from 1910 to 1913
Ascending node			Descending node		
Saros	Map	Gamma	Saros	Map	Gamma
117	May 9, 1910 Total	−0.9437	122	November 2, 1910 Partial	1.0603
127	April 28, 1911 Total	−0.2294	132	October 22, 1911 Annular	0.3224
137	April 17, 1912 Hybrid	0.528	142	October 10, 1912 Total	−0.4149
147	April 6, 1913 Partial	1.3147	152	September 30, 1913 Partial	−1.1005

=== Saros 122 ===
This eclipse is a part of Saros series 122, repeating every 18 years, 11 days, and containing 70 events. The series started with a partial solar eclipse on April 17, 991 AD. It contains total eclipses from July 12, 1135 through August 3, 1171; hybrid eclipses on August 13, 1189 and August 25, 1207; and annular eclipses from September 4, 1225 through October 10, 1874. The series ends at member 70 as a partial eclipse on May 17, 2235. Its eclipses are tabulated in three columns; every third eclipse in the same column is one exeligmos apart, so they all cast shadows over approximately the same parts of the Earth.

The longest duration of totality was produced by member 9 at 1 minutes, 25 seconds on July 12, 1135, and the longest duration of annularity was produced by member 50 at 6 minutes, 28 seconds on October 10, 1874. All eclipses in this series occur at the Moon’s descending node of orbit.

Series members 46–68 occur between 1801 and 2200:
46	47	48
August 28, 1802	September 7, 1820	September 18, 1838
49	50	51
September 29, 1856	October 10, 1874	October 20, 1892
52	53	54
November 2, 1910	November 12, 1928	November 23, 1946
55	56	57
December 4, 1964	December 15, 1982	December 25, 2000
58	59	60
January 6, 2019	January 16, 2037	January 27, 2055
61	62	63
February 7, 2073	February 18, 2091	March 1, 2109
64	65	66
March 13, 2127	March 23, 2145	April 3, 2163
67	68	
April 14, 2181	April 25, 2199	

=== Metonic series ===
The metonic series repeats eclipses every 19 years (6939.69 days), lasting about 5 cycles. Eclipses occur in nearly the same calendar date. In addition, the octon subseries repeats 1/5 of that or every 3.8 years (1387.94 days). All eclipses in this table occur at the Moon's descending node.

22 eclipse events between March 27, 1884 and August 20, 1971
March 27–29	January 14	November 1–2	August 20–21	June 8
108	110	112	114	116
March 27, 1884			August 20, 1895	June 8, 1899
118	120	122	124	126
March 29, 1903	January 14, 1907	November 2, 1910	August 21, 1914	June 8, 1918
128	130	132	134	136
March 28, 1922	January 14, 1926	November 1, 1929	August 21, 1933	June 8, 1937
138	140	142	144	146
March 27, 1941	January 14, 1945	November 1, 1948	August 20, 1952	June 8, 1956
148	150	152	154	
March 27, 1960	January 14, 1964	November 2, 1967	August 20, 1971	

=== Tritos series ===
This eclipse is a part of a tritos cycle, repeating at alternating nodes every 135 synodic months (≈ 3986.63 days, or 11 years minus 1 month). Their appearance and longitude are irregular due to a lack of synchronization with the anomalistic month (period of perigee), but groupings of 3 tritos cycles (≈ 33 years minus 3 months) come close (≈ 434.044 anomalistic months), so eclipses are similar in these groupings.

Series members between 1801 and 2200
September 8, 1801 (Saros 112)	August 7, 1812 (Saros 113)	July 8, 1823 (Saros 114)	June 7, 1834 (Saros 115)	May 6, 1845 (Saros 116)
April 5, 1856 (Saros 117)	March 6, 1867 (Saros 118)	February 2, 1878 (Saros 119)	January 1, 1889 (Saros 120)	December 3, 1899 (Saros 121)
November 2, 1910 (Saros 122)	October 1, 1921 (Saros 123)	August 31, 1932 (Saros 124)	August 1, 1943 (Saros 125)	June 30, 1954 (Saros 126)
May 30, 1965 (Saros 127)	April 29, 1976 (Saros 128)	March 29, 1987 (Saros 129)	February 26, 1998 (Saros 130)	January 26, 2009 (Saros 131)
December 26, 2019 (Saros 132)	November 25, 2030 (Saros 133)	October 25, 2041 (Saros 134)	September 22, 2052 (Saros 135)	August 24, 2063 (Saros 136)
July 24, 2074 (Saros 137)	June 22, 2085 (Saros 138)	May 22, 2096 (Saros 139)	April 23, 2107 (Saros 140)	March 22, 2118 (Saros 141)
February 18, 2129 (Saros 142)	January 20, 2140 (Saros 143)	December 19, 2150 (Saros 144)	November 17, 2161 (Saros 145)	October 17, 2172 (Saros 146)
September 16, 2183 (Saros 147)	August 16, 2194 (Saros 148)			

=== Inex series ===
This eclipse is a part of the long period inex cycle, repeating at alternating nodes, every 358 synodic months (≈ 10,571.95 days, or 29 years minus 20 days). Their appearance and longitude are irregular due to a lack of synchronization with the anomalistic month (period of perigee). However, groupings of 3 inex cycles (≈ 87 years minus 2 months) comes close (≈ 1,151.02 anomalistic months), so eclipses are similar in these groupings.

Series members between 1801 and 2200
January 1, 1824 (Saros 119)	December 11, 1852 (Saros 120)	November 21, 1881 (Saros 121)
November 2, 1910 (Saros 122)	October 12, 1939 (Saros 123)	September 22, 1968 (Saros 124)
September 2, 1997 (Saros 125)	August 12, 2026 (Saros 126)	July 24, 2055 (Saros 127)
July 3, 2084 (Saros 128)	June 13, 2113 (Saros 129)	May 25, 2142 (Saros 130)
May 5, 2171 (Saros 131)	April 14, 2200 (Saros 132)	
