= Solar eclipse of June 21, 2058 =

Future partial solar eclipse

- Partial eclipse
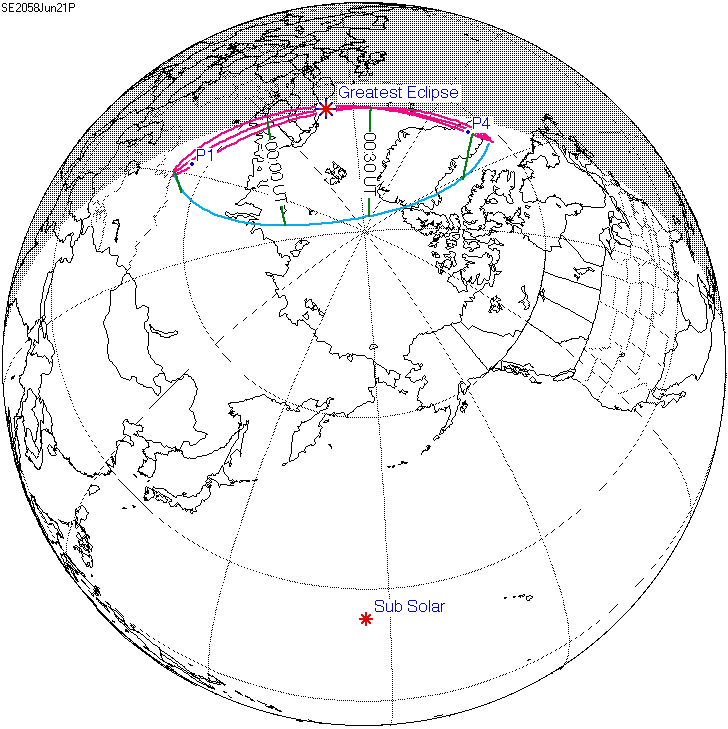
- Map
- Gamma: 1.4869
- Magnitude: 0.126

Maximum eclipse
- Coordinates: 65.9°N 9.9°E

Times (UTC)
- Greatest eclipse: 0:19:35

References
- Saros: 157 (1 of 70)
- Catalog # (SE5000): 9637

A partial solar eclipse will occur at the Moon's ascending node of orbit between Thursday, June 20 and Friday, June 21, 2058, with a magnitude of 0.126. A solar eclipse occurs when the Moon passes between Earth and the Sun, thereby totally or partly obscuring the image of the Sun for a viewer on Earth. A partial solar eclipse occurs in the polar regions of the Earth when the center of the Moon's shadow misses the Earth.

The partial solar eclipse will be visible for parts of western Russia, Scandinavia, and Greenland. This event will mark the beginning of Saros series 157.

== Eclipse details ==
Shown below are two tables displaying details about this particular solar eclipse. The first table outlines times at which the Moon's penumbra or umbra attains the specific parameter, and the second table describes various other parameters pertaining to this eclipse.

June 21, 2058 Solar Eclipse Times
Event	Time (UTC)
First Penumbral External Contact	2058 June 20 at 23:24:06.1 UTC
Greatest Eclipse	2058 June 21 at 00:19:34.6 UTC
Ecliptic Conjunction	2058 June 21 at 00:36:33.9 UTC
Equatorial Conjunction	2058 June 21 at 00:36:38.7 UTC
Last Penumbral External Contact	2058 June 21 at 01:14:58.7 UTC

June 21, 2058 Solar Eclipse Parameters
Parameter	Value
Eclipse Magnitude	0.12608
Eclipse Obscuration	0.05190
Gamma	1.48693
Sun Right Ascension	05h59m41.6s
Sun Declination	+23°25'56.0"
Sun Semi-Diameter	15'44.3"
Sun Equatorial Horizontal Parallax	08.7"
Moon Right Ascension	05h59m06.9s
Moon Declination	+24°46'21.8"
Moon Semi-Diameter	14'50.9"
Moon Equatorial Horizontal Parallax	0°54'29.6"
ΔT	89.4 s

== Eclipse season ==
This eclipse is part of an eclipse season, a period, roughly every six months, when eclipses occur. Only two (or occasionally three) eclipse seasons occur each year, and each season lasts about 35 days and repeats just short of six months (173 days) later; thus two full eclipse seasons always occur each year. Either two or three eclipses happen each eclipse season. In the sequence below, each eclipse is separated by a fortnight. The first and last eclipse in this sequence is separated by one synodic month.

Eclipse season of May–June 2058
May 22 Ascending node (new moon)	June 6 Descending node (full moon)	June 21 Ascending node (new moon)
Partial solar eclipse Solar Saros 119	Total lunar eclipse Lunar Saros 131	Partial solar eclipse Solar Saros 157

== Related eclipses ==
=== Eclipses in 2058 ===
- A partial solar eclipse on May 22.
- A total lunar eclipse on June 6.
- A partial solar eclipse on June 21.
- A partial solar eclipse on November 16.
- A total lunar eclipse on November 30.

=== Metonic ===
- Preceded by: Solar eclipse of September 2, 2054

=== Tzolkinex ===
- Followed by: Solar eclipse of August 2, 2065

=== Half-Saros ===
- Preceded by: Lunar eclipse of June 15, 2049
- Followed by: Lunar eclipse of June 26, 2067

=== Tritos ===
- Preceded by: Solar eclipse of July 22, 2047
- Followed by: Solar eclipse of May 20, 2069

=== Solar Saros 157 ===
- Followed by: Solar eclipse of July 1, 2076

=== Inex ===
- Preceded by: Solar eclipse of July 11, 2029
- Followed by: Solar eclipse of June 1, 2087

=== Triad ===
- Preceded by: Solar eclipse of August 20, 1971

=== Solar eclipses of 2054–2058 ===
This eclipse is a member of a semester series. An eclipse in a semester series of solar eclipses repeats approximately every 177 days and 4 hours (a semester) at alternating nodes of the Moon's orbit.

The partial solar eclipses on March 9, 2054 and September 2, 2054 occur in the previous lunar year eclipse set, and the partial solar eclipses on May 22, 2058 and November 16, 2058 occur in the next lunar year eclipse set.

Solar eclipse series sets from 2054 to 2058
Ascending node			Descending node		
Saros	Map	Gamma	Saros	Map	Gamma
117	August 3, 2054 Partial	−1.4941	122	January 27, 2055 Partial	1.155
127	July 24, 2055 Total	−0.8012	132	January 16, 2056 Annular	0.4199
137	July 12, 2056 Annular	−0.0426	142	January 5, 2057 Total	−0.2837
147	July 1, 2057 Annular	0.7455	152	December 26, 2057 Total	−0.9405
157	June 21, 2058 Partial	1.4869			

=== Saros 157 ===
This eclipse is a part of Saros series 157, repeating every 18 years, 11 days, and containing 70 events. The series will start with a partial solar eclipse on June 21, 2058. It contains annular eclipses from August 25, 2166 through March 10, 2491; hybrid eclipses from March 22, 2509 through April 12, 2545; and total eclipses from April 24, 2563 through April 21, 3158. The series ends at member 70 as a partial eclipse on July 17, 3302. Its eclipses are tabulated in three columns; every third eclipse in the same column is one exeligmos apart, so they all cast shadows over approximately the same parts of the Earth.

The longest duration of annularity will be produced by member 15 at 4 minutes, 16 seconds on November 22, 2310, and the longest duration of totality will be produced by member 38 at 5 minutes, 57 seconds on July 31, 2725. All eclipses in this series occur at the Moon’s ascending node of orbit.

Series members 1–8 occur between 2058 and 2200:
1	2	3
June 21, 2058	July 1, 2076	July 12, 2094
4	5	6
July 23, 2112	August 4, 2130	August 14, 2148
7	8	
August 25, 2166	September 4, 2184	

=== Metonic series ===
The metonic series repeats eclipses every 19 years (6939.69 days), lasting about 5 cycles. Eclipses occur in nearly the same calendar date. In addition, the octon subseries repeats 1/5 of that or every 3.8 years (1387.94 days). All eclipses in this table occur at the Moon's ascending node.

21 eclipse events between June 21, 1982 and June 21, 2058
June 21	April 8–9	January 26	November 13–14	September 1–2
117	119	121	123	125
June 21, 1982	April 9, 1986	January 26, 1990	November 13, 1993	September 2, 1997
127	129	131	133	135
June 21, 2001	April 8, 2005	January 26, 2009	November 13, 2012	September 1, 2016
137	139	141	143	145
June 21, 2020	April 8, 2024	January 26, 2028	November 14, 2031	September 2, 2035
147	149	151	153	155
June 21, 2039	April 9, 2043	January 26, 2047	November 14, 2050	September 2, 2054
157
June 21, 2058

=== Tritos series ===
This eclipse is a part of a tritos cycle, repeating at alternating nodes every 135 synodic months (≈ 3986.63 days, or 11 years minus 1 month). Their appearance and longitude are irregular due to a lack of synchronization with the anomalistic month (period of perigee), but groupings of 3 tritos cycles (≈ 33 years minus 3 months) come close (≈ 434.044 anomalistic months), so eclipses are similar in these groupings.

The partial solar eclipses on November 16, 2134 (part of Saros 164) and October 16, 2145 (part of Saros 165) are also a part of this series but are not included in the table below.

Series members between 1801 and 2069
June 6, 1807 (Saros 134)	May 5, 1818 (Saros 135)	April 3, 1829 (Saros 136)	March 4, 1840 (Saros 137)	February 1, 1851 (Saros 138)
December 31, 1861 (Saros 139)	November 30, 1872 (Saros 140)	October 30, 1883 (Saros 141)	September 29, 1894 (Saros 142)	August 30, 1905 (Saros 143)
July 30, 1916 (Saros 144)	June 29, 1927 (Saros 145)	May 29, 1938 (Saros 146)	April 28, 1949 (Saros 147)	March 27, 1960 (Saros 148)
February 25, 1971 (Saros 149)	January 25, 1982 (Saros 150)	December 24, 1992 (Saros 151)	November 23, 2003 (Saros 152)	October 23, 2014 (Saros 153)
September 21, 2025 (Saros 154)	August 21, 2036 (Saros 155)	July 22, 2047 (Saros 156)	June 21, 2058 (Saros 157)	May 20, 2069 (Saros 158)

=== Inex series ===
This eclipse is a part of the long period inex cycle, repeating at alternating nodes, every 358 synodic months (≈ 10,571.95 days, or 29 years minus 20 days). Their appearance and longitude are irregular due to a lack of synchronization with the anomalistic month (period of perigee). However, groupings of 3 inex cycles (≈ 87 years minus 2 months) comes close (≈ 1,151.02 anomalistic months), so eclipses are similar in these groupings.

Series members between 1801 and 2200
November 29, 1826 (Saros 149)	November 9, 1855 (Saros 150)	October 19, 1884 (Saros 151)
September 30, 1913 (Saros 152)	September 10, 1942 (Saros 153)	August 20, 1971 (Saros 154)
July 31, 2000 (Saros 155)	July 11, 2029 (Saros 156)	June 21, 2058 (Saros 157)
June 1, 2087 (Saros 158)		
April 1, 2174 (Saros 161)		
