= Solar Saros 157 =

Saros cycle series 157 for solar eclipses

Saros cycle series 157 for solar eclipses will occur at the Moon's ascending node, repeating every 18 years, 11 days, containing 70 eclipses, 56 of which will be umbral (19 annular, 3 hybrid, 34 total). The first eclipse will occur on 21 June 2058 and the last will be on 17 July 3302.

The longest totality will be 5 minutes 57 seconds on 31 July 2725 and the longest annular will be 4 minutes 16 seconds on 22 November 2310.

This solar saros is linked to Lunar Saros 150.

== Umbral eclipses ==
Umbral eclipses (annular, total and hybrid) can be further classified as either: 1) Central (two limits), 2) Central (one limit) or 3) Non-Central (one limit). The statistical distribution of these classes in Saros series 157 appears in the following table.

| Classification | Number | Percent |
|---|---|---|
| All Umbral eclipses | 56 | 100.00% |
| Central (two limits) | 54 | 96.43% |
| Central (one limit) | 2 | 3.57% |
| Non-central (one limit) | 0 | 0.0% |

== All eclipses ==
| Saros | Member | Date | Time (Greatest) UTC | Type | Location Lat, Long | Gamma | Mag. | Width (km) | Duration (min:sec) | Ref |
|---|---|---|---|---|---|---|---|---|---|---|
| 157 | 1 | June 21, 2058 | 0:19:35 | Partial | 65.9N 9.9E | 1.4869 | 0.126 | | | |
| 157 | 2 | July 1, 2076 | 6:50:43 | Partial | 67N 98.1W | 1.4005 | 0.2746 | | | |
| 157 | 3 | July 12, 2094 | 13:24:35 | Partial | 68N 152.8E | 1.315 | 0.4224 | | | |
| 157 | 4 | July 23, 2112 | 19:58:32 | Partial | 69N 43.1E | 1.2284 | 0.5725 | | | |
| 157 | 5 | August 4, 2130 | 2:38:44 | Partial | 69.9N 68.7W | 1.1461 | 0.7158 | | | |
| 157 | 6 | August 14, 2148 | 9:22:21 | Partial | 70.7N 178E | 1.0655 | 0.8562 | | | |
| 157 | 7 | August 25, 2166 | 16:13:35 | Annular | 74.4N 41.5E | 0.9901 | 0.9531 | - | 3m 0s | |
| 157 | 8 | September 4, 2184 | 23:11:00 | Annular | 67.1N 123.3W | 0.9185 | 0.9576 | 393 | 3m 12s | |
| 157 | 9 | September 17, 2202 | 6:18:53 | Annular | 57.1N 114.2E | 0.8546 | 0.9597 | 281 | 3m 24s | |
| 157 | 10 | September 27, 2220 | 13:35:07 | Annular | 48N 2.8W | 0.7966 | 0.9609 | 232 | 3m 36s | |
| 157 | 11 | October 8, 2238 | 21:01:18 | Annular | 40.1N 119.7W | 0.7459 | 0.9618 | 206 | 3m 47s | |
| 157 | 12 | October 19, 2256 | 4:37:31 | Annular | 33.1N 122.3E | 0.7025 | 0.9624 | 190 | 3m 59s | |
| 157 | 13 | October 30, 2274 | 12:24:18 | Annular | 27N 2.4E | 0.6667 | 0.9629 | 179 | 4m 8s | |
| 157 | 14 | November 9, 2292 | 20:20:07 | Annular | 22N 119.1W | 0.6376 | 0.9635 | 171 | 4m 14s | |
| 157 | 15 | November 22, 2310 | 4:24:19 | Annular | 17.9N 117.8E | 0.6145 | 0.9642 | 164 | 4m 16s | |
| 157 | 16 | December 2, 2328 | 12:36:37 | Annular | 14.8N 6.9W | 0.5974 | 0.9652 | 157 | 4m 13s | |
| 157 | 17 | December 13, 2346 | 20:55:36 | Annular | 12.8N 133.1W | 0.5848 | 0.9665 | 149 | 4m 4s | |
| 157 | 18 | December 24, 2364 | 5:18:59 | Annular | 11.6N 99.8E | 0.5752 | 0.9683 | 139 | 3m 48s | |
| 157 | 19 | January 4, 2383 | 13:46:26 | Annular | 11.4N 28.1W | 0.5682 | 0.9706 | 128 | 3m 26s | |
| 157 | 20 | January 14, 2401 | 22:15:20 | Annular | 11.9N 156.4W | 0.5617 | 0.9735 | 114 | 3m 0s | |
| 157 | 21 | January 26, 2419 | 6:44:37 | Annular | 13.2N 75.2E | 0.555 | 0.977 | 98 | 2m 30s | |
| 157 | 22 | February 5, 2437 | 15:11:25 | Annular | 14.9N 52.5W | 0.5453 | 0.981 | 79 | 1m 58s | |
| 157 | 23 | February 16, 2455 | 23:36:27 | Annular | 17.1N 179.6W | 0.5335 | 0.9857 | 59 | 1m 25s | |
| 157 | 24 | February 27, 2473 | 7:56:51 | Annular | 19.6N 54.6E | 0.5168 | 0.9907 | 37 | 0m 53s | |
| 157 | 25 | March 10, 2491 | 16:11:57 | Annular | 22.2N 69.6W | 0.4952 | 0.9964 | 14 | 0m 20s | |
| 157 | 26 | March 22, 2509 | 0:20:47 | Hybrid | 24.8N 168.2E | 0.4676 | 1.0023 | 9 | 0m 12s | |
| 157 | 27 | April 2, 2527 | 8:23:26 | Hybrid | 27.3N 48.1E | 0.4341 | 1.0086 | 33 | 0m 45s | |
| 157 | 28 | April 12, 2545 | 16:19:46 | Hybrid | 29.4N 69.8W | 0.3942 | 1.0149 | 55 | 1m 17s | |
| 157 | 29 | April 24, 2563 | 0:08:31 | Total | 31.1N 174.8E | 0.3474 | 1.0213 | 77 | 1m 49s | |
| 157 | 30 | May 4, 2581 | 7:51:50 | Total | 32N 61.3E | 0.2951 | 1.0276 | 98 | 2m 22s | |
| 157 | 31 | May 15, 2599 | 15:28:44 | Total | 32N 50.2W | 0.237 | 1.0337 | 117 | 2m 56s | |
| 157 | 32 | May 26, 2617 | 23:01:04 | Total | 31N 160.5W | 0.1741 | 1.0394 | 134 | 3m 30s | |
| 157 | 33 | June 7, 2635 | 6:28:22 | Total | 28.8N 90.3E | 0.1063 | 1.0447 | 150 | 4m 4s | |
| 157 | 34 | June 17, 2653 | 13:53:05 | Total | 25.5N 18.8W | 0.0356 | 1.0493 | 164 | 4m 37s | |
| 157 | 35 | June 28, 2671 | 21:15:30 | Total | 21.1N 128W | -0.0374 | 1.0534 | 177 | 5m 7s | |
| 157 | 36 | July 9, 2689 | 4:36:31 | Total | 15.8N 122.4E | -0.1123 | 1.0568 | 188 | 5m 31s | |
| 157 | 37 | July 21, 2707 | 11:58:10 | Total | 9.8N 11.7E | -0.1871 | 1.0593 | 199 | 5m 48s | |
| 157 | 38 | July 31, 2725 | 19:21:13 | Total | 3.1N 100W | -0.2611 | 1.0612 | 208 | 5m 57s | |
| 157 | 39 | August 12, 2743 | 2:47:40 | Total | 4S 146.9E | -0.3329 | 1.0623 | 216 | 5m 56s | |
| 157 | 40 | August 22, 2761 | 10:17:10 | Total | 11.5S 32.4E | -0.4025 | 1.0626 | 223 | 5m 47s | |
| 157 | 41 | September 2, 2779 | 17:52:25 | Total | 19.2S 83.8W | -0.4676 | 1.0622 | 230 | 5m 31s | |
| 157 | 42 | September 13, 2797 | 1:33:06 | Total | 26.9S 158.4E | -0.5286 | 1.0611 | 235 | 5m 11s | |
| 157 | 43 | September 24, 2815 | 9:20:27 | Total | 34.6S 38.7E | -0.5844 | 1.0596 | 240 | 4m 48s | |
| 157 | 44 | October 4, 2833 | 17:14:56 | Total | 42.2S 82.6W | -0.6347 | 1.0576 | 244 | 4m 23s | |
| 157 | 45 | October 16, 2851 | 1:17:27 | Total | 49.5S 154.4E | -0.6786 | 1.0553 | 248 | 4m 0s | |
| 157 | 46 | October 26, 2869 | 9:28:07 | Total | 56.5S 30.1E | -0.716 | 1.0528 | 250 | 3m 38s | |
| 157 | 47 | November 6, 2887 | 17:45:34 | Total | 63S 94.6W | -0.7479 | 1.0502 | 252 | 3m 18s | |
| 157 | 48 | November 18, 2905 | 2:11:36 | Total | 68.9S 141.3E | -0.7731 | 1.0477 | 252 | 3m 1s | |
| 157 | 49 | November 29, 2923 | 10:43:53 | Total | 73.8S 20.2E | -0.7936 | 1.0454 | 251 | 2m 47s | |
| 157 | 50 | December 9, 2941 | 19:23:14 | Total | 77S 95.1W | -0.8082 | 1.0434 | 248 | 2m 36s | |
| 157 | 51 | December 21, 2959 | 4:06:06 | Total | 77.9S 155E | -0.8202 | 1.0417 | 246 | 2m 28s | |
| 157 | 52 | December 31, 2977 | 12:54:33 | Total | 76.1S 40.7E | -0.8278 | 1.0405 | 244 | 2m 23s | |
| 157 | 53 | January 11, 2996 | 21:44:38 | Total | 72.9S 81.5W | -0.8345 | 1.0397 | 243 | 2m 20s | |
| 157 | 54 | January 23, 3014 | 6:36:40 | Total | 68.9S 150.1E | -0.8397 | 1.0394 | 244 | 2m 20s | |
| 157 | 55 | February 3, 3032 | 15:27:40 | Total | 64.9S 19.0E | -0.8461 | 1.0395 | 248 | 2m 22s | |
| 157 | 56 | February 14, 3050 | 0:17:54 | Total | 61.0S 113.6W | -0.8533 | 1.0400 | 255 | 2m 26s | |
| 157 | 57 | February 25, 3068 | 9:03:58 | Total | 57.5S 114.4E | -0.8641 | 1.0407 | 268 | 2m 31s | |
| 157 | 58 | March 7, 3086 | 17:46:00 | Total | 54.6S 16.9W | -0.8784 | 1.0416 | 287 | 2m 38s | |
| 157 | 59 | March 19, 3104 | 2:22:05 | Total | 52.7S 146.4W | -0.8979 | 1.0426 | 318 | 2m 44s | |
| 157 | 60 | March 30, 3122 | 10:52:38 | Total | 51.9S 85.9E | -0.9220 | 1.0433 | 368 | 2m 50s | |
| 157 | 61 | April 9, 3140 | 19:14:26 | Total | 53.2S 37.8W | -0.9534 | 1.0436 | 480 | 2m 51s | |
| 157 | 62 | April 21, 3158 | 3:29:39 | Total | 58.3S 153.9W | -0.9899 | 1.0421 | - | 2m 39s | |
| 157 | 63 | May 1, 3176 | 11:35:58 | Partial | 62.3S 88.4E | -1.0337 | 0.9515 | | | |
| 157 | 64 | May 12, 3194 | 19:36:07 | Partial | 63.0S 40.0W | -1.0825 | 0.8589 | | | |
| 157 | 65 | May 23, 3212 | 3:26:31 | Partial | 63.8S 166.3W | -1.1388 | 0.7514 | | | |
| 157 | 66 | June 3, 3230 | 11:12:09 | Partial | 64.6S 68.4E | -1.1988 | 0.6368 | | | |
| 157 | 67 | June 13, 3248 | 18:49:45 | Partial | 65.6S 55.2W | -1.2645 | 0.5110 | | | |
| 157 | 68 | June 25, 3266 | 2:23:46 | Partial | 66.6S 178.3W | -1.3329 | 0.3802 | | | |
| 157 | 69 | July 5, 3284 | 9:51:17 | Partial | 67.6S 59.9E | -1.4059 | 0.2406 | | | |
| 157 | 70 | July 17, 3302 | 17:17:19 | Partial | 68.6S 62.1W | -1.4796 | 0.1004 | | | |
