= Solar eclipse of July 1, 2076 =

Future partial solar eclipse

- Partial eclipse
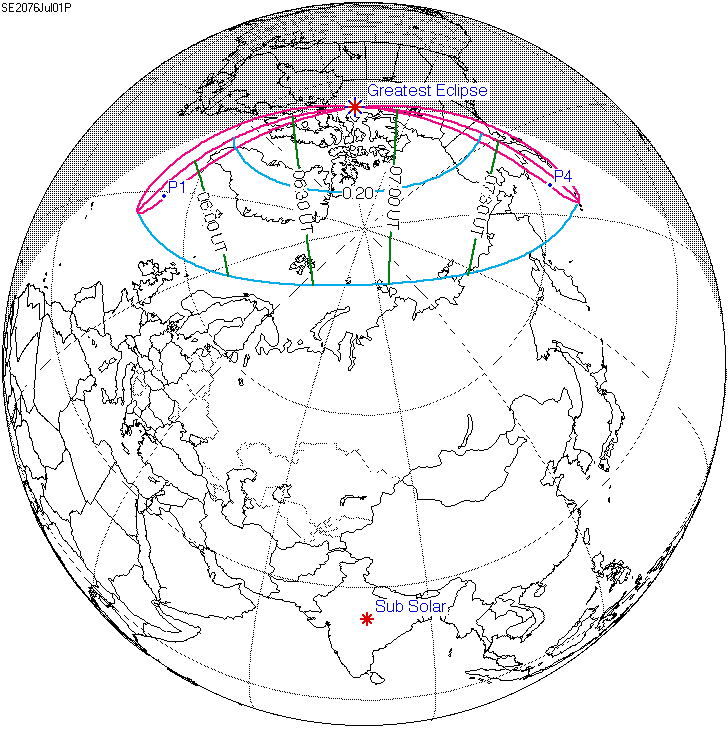
- Map
- Gamma: 1.4005
- Magnitude: 0.2746

Maximum eclipse
- Coordinates: 67°N 98.1°W

Times (UTC)
- Greatest eclipse: 6:50:43

References
- Saros: 157 (2 of 70)
- Catalog # (SE5000): 9678

A partial solar eclipse will occur at the Moon's ascending node of orbit on Wednesday, July 1, 2076, with a magnitude of 0.2746. A solar eclipse occurs when the Moon passes between Earth and the Sun, thereby totally or partly obscuring the image of the Sun for a viewer on Earth. A partial solar eclipse occurs in the polar regions of the Earth when the center of the Moon's shadow misses the Earth.

This will be the third of four solar eclipses in 2076, with the others occurring on January 6, June 1, and November 26.

The partial solar eclipse will be visible for parts of Greenland, northern Canada, Alaska, and the Russian Far East.

== Eclipse details ==
Shown below are two tables displaying details about this particular solar eclipse. The first table outlines times at which the Moon's penumbra or umbra attains the specific parameter, and the second table describes various other parameters pertaining to this eclipse.

July 1, 2076 Solar Eclipse Times
Event	Time (UTC)
First Penumbral External Contact	2076 July 1 at 05:30:23.1 UTC
Greatest Eclipse	2076 July 1 at 06:50:43.3 UTC
Equatorial Conjunction	2076 July 1 at 06:53:58.3 UTC
Ecliptic Conjunction	2076 July 1 at 07:06:45.0 UTC
Last Penumbral External Contact	2076 July 1 at 08:11:05.4 UTC

July 1, 2076 Solar Eclipse Parameters
Parameter	Value
Eclipse Magnitude	0.27461
Eclipse Obscuration	0.16287
Gamma	1.40052
Sun Right Ascension	06h44m59.8s
Sun Declination	+23°01'35.5"
Sun Semi-Diameter	15'43.9"
Sun Equatorial Horizontal Parallax	08.6"
Moon Right Ascension	06h44m53.2s
Moon Declination	+24°17'50.8"
Moon Semi-Diameter	14'52.7"
Moon Equatorial Horizontal Parallax	0°54'36.1"
ΔT	102.6 s

== Eclipse season ==
This eclipse is part of an eclipse season, a period, roughly every six months, when eclipses occur. Only two (or occasionally three) eclipse seasons occur each year, and each season lasts about 35 days and repeats just short of six months (173 days) later; thus two full eclipse seasons always occur each year. Either two or three eclipses happen each eclipse season. In the sequence below, each eclipse is separated by a fortnight. The first and last eclipse in this sequence is separated by one synodic month.

Eclipse season of June–July 2076
June 1 Ascending node (new moon)	June 17 Descending node (full moon)	July 1 Ascending node (new moon)
Partial solar eclipse Solar Saros 119	Total lunar eclipse Lunar Saros 131	Partial solar eclipse Solar Saros 157

== Related eclipses ==
=== Eclipses in 2076 ===
- A total solar eclipse on January 6.
- A partial solar eclipse on June 1.
- A total lunar eclipse on June 17.
- A partial solar eclipse on July 1.
- A partial solar eclipse on November 26.
- A total lunar eclipse on December 10.

=== Metonic ===
- Preceded by: Solar eclipse of September 12, 2072

=== Tzolkinex ===
- Preceded by: Solar eclipse of May 20, 2069
- Followed by: Solar eclipse of August 13, 2083

=== Half-Saros ===
- Preceded by: Lunar eclipse of June 27, 2067
- Followed by: Lunar eclipse of July 7, 2085

=== Tritos ===
- Preceded by: Solar eclipse of August 2, 2065
- Followed by: Solar eclipse of June 1, 2087

=== Solar Saros 157 ===
- Preceded by: Solar eclipse of June 21, 2058
- Followed by: Solar eclipse of July 12, 2094

=== Inex ===
- Preceded by: Solar eclipse of July 22, 2047
- Followed by: Solar eclipse of June 12, 2105

=== Triad ===
- Preceded by: Solar eclipse of August 31, 1989

=== Solar eclipses of 2073–2076 ===
This eclipse is a member of a semester series. An eclipse in a semester series of solar eclipses repeats approximately every 177 days and 4 hours (a semester) at alternating nodes of the Moon's orbit.

The partial solar eclipses on June 1, 2076 and November 26, 2076 occur in the next lunar year eclipse set.

Solar eclipse series sets from 2073 to 2076
Descending node			Ascending node		
Saros	Map	Gamma	Saros	Map	Gamma
122	February 7, 2073 Partial	1.1651	127	August 3, 2073 Total	−0.8763
132	January 27, 2074 Annular	0.4251	137	July 24, 2074 Annular	−0.1242
142	January 16, 2075 Total	−0.2799	147	July 13, 2075 Annular	0.6583
152	January 6, 2076 Total	−0.9373	157	July 1, 2076 Partial	1.4005

=== Saros 157 ===
This eclipse is a part of Saros series 157, repeating every 18 years, 11 days, and containing 70 events. The series will start with a partial solar eclipse on June 21, 2058. It contains annular eclipses from August 25, 2166 through March 10, 2491; hybrid eclipses from March 22, 2509 through April 12, 2545; and total eclipses from April 24, 2563 through April 21, 3158. The series ends at member 70 as a partial eclipse on July 17, 3302. Its eclipses are tabulated in three columns; every third eclipse in the same column is one exeligmos apart, so they all cast shadows over approximately the same parts of the Earth.

The longest duration of annularity will be produced by member 15 at 4 minutes, 16 seconds on November 22, 2310, and the longest duration of totality will be produced by member 38 at 5 minutes, 57 seconds on July 31, 2725. All eclipses in this series occur at the Moon’s ascending node of orbit.

Series members 1–8 occur between 2058 and 2200:
1	2	3
June 21, 2058	July 1, 2076	July 12, 2094
4	5	6
July 23, 2112	August 4, 2130	August 14, 2148
7	8	
August 25, 2166	September 4, 2184	

=== Metonic series ===
The metonic series repeats eclipses every 19 years (6939.69 days), lasting about 5 cycles. Eclipses occur in nearly the same calendar date. In addition, the octon subseries repeats 1/5 of that or every 3.8 years (1387.94 days). All eclipses in this table occur at the Moon's ascending node.

21 eclipse events between July 1, 2000 and July 1, 2076
July 1–2	April 19–20	February 5–7	November 24–25	September 12–13
117	119	121	123	125
July 1, 2000	April 19, 2004	February 7, 2008	November 25, 2011	September 13, 2015
127	129	131	133	135
July 2, 2019	April 20, 2023	February 6, 2027	November 25, 2030	September 12, 2034
137	139	141	143	145
July 2, 2038	April 20, 2042	February 5, 2046	November 25, 2049	September 12, 2053
147	149	151	153	155
July 1, 2057	April 20, 2061	February 5, 2065	November 24, 2068	September 12, 2072
157
July 1, 2076

=== Tritos series ===
This eclipse is a part of a tritos cycle, repeating at alternating nodes every 135 synodic months (≈ 3986.63 days, or 11 years minus 1 month). Their appearance and longitude are irregular due to a lack of synchronization with the anomalistic month (period of perigee), but groupings of 3 tritos cycles (≈ 33 years minus 3 months) come close (≈ 434.044 anomalistic months), so eclipses are similar in these groupings.

Series members between 1801 and 2087
August 17, 1803 (Saros 132)	July 17, 1814 (Saros 133)	June 16, 1825 (Saros 134)	May 15, 1836 (Saros 135)	April 15, 1847 (Saros 136)
March 15, 1858 (Saros 137)	February 11, 1869 (Saros 138)	January 11, 1880 (Saros 139)	December 12, 1890 (Saros 140)	November 11, 1901 (Saros 141)
October 10, 1912 (Saros 142)	September 10, 1923 (Saros 143)	August 10, 1934 (Saros 144)	July 9, 1945 (Saros 145)	June 8, 1956 (Saros 146)
May 9, 1967 (Saros 147)	April 7, 1978 (Saros 148)	March 7, 1989 (Saros 149)	February 5, 2000 (Saros 150)	January 4, 2011 (Saros 151)
December 4, 2021 (Saros 152)	November 3, 2032 (Saros 153)	October 3, 2043 (Saros 154)	September 2, 2054 (Saros 155)	August 2, 2065 (Saros 156)
July 1, 2076 (Saros 157)	June 1, 2087 (Saros 158)			

=== Inex series ===
This eclipse is a part of the long period inex cycle, repeating at alternating nodes, every 358 synodic months (≈ 10,571.95 days, or 29 years minus 20 days). Their appearance and longitude are irregular due to a lack of synchronization with the anomalistic month (period of perigee). However, groupings of 3 inex cycles (≈ 87 years minus 2 months) comes close (≈ 1,151.02 anomalistic months), so eclipses are similar in these groupings.

Series members between 1801 and 2200
December 30, 1815 (Saros 148)	December 9, 1844 (Saros 149)	November 20, 1873 (Saros 150)
October 31, 1902 (Saros 151)	October 11, 1931 (Saros 152)	September 20, 1960 (Saros 153)
August 31, 1989 (Saros 154)	August 11, 2018 (Saros 155)	July 22, 2047 (Saros 156)
July 1, 2076 (Saros 157)	June 12, 2105 (Saros 158)	May 23, 2134 (Saros 159)
	April 12, 2192 (Saros 161)	
