= Solar eclipse of September 2, 1997 =

20th-century partial solar eclipse

- Partial eclipse
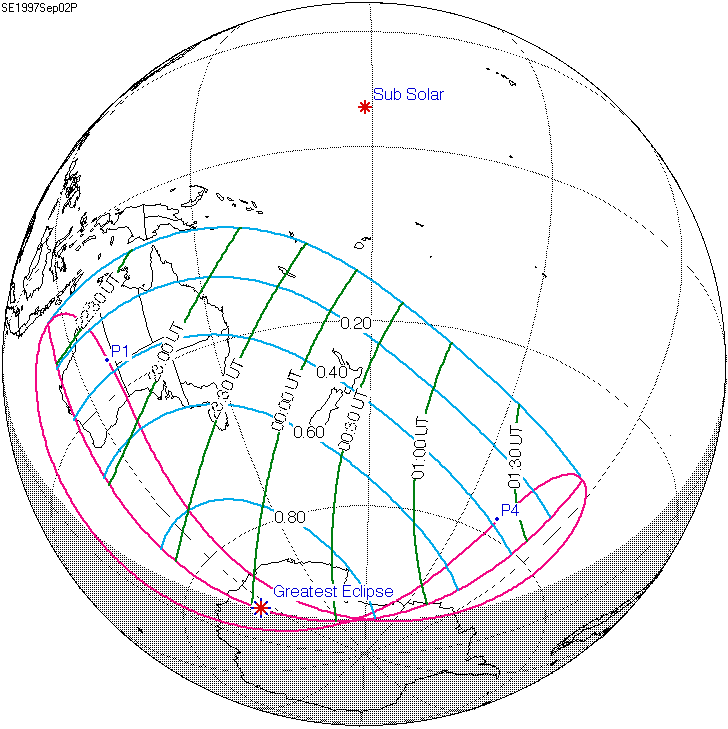
- Map
- Gamma: −1.0352
- Magnitude: 0.8988

Maximum eclipse
- Coordinates: 71.8°S 114.3°E

Times (UTC)
- Greatest eclipse: 0:04:48

References
- Saros: 125 (53 of 73)
- Catalog # (SE5000): 9502

A partial solar eclipse occurred at the Moon's ascending node of orbit between Monday, September 1 and Tuesday, September 2, 1997, with a magnitude of 0.8988. A solar eclipse occurs when the Moon passes between Earth and the Sun, thereby totally or partly obscuring the image of the Sun for a viewer on Earth. A partial solar eclipse occurs in the polar regions of the Earth when the center of the Moon's shadow misses the Earth.

A partial eclipse was visible for parts of Australia, Oceania, and Antarctica.

== Eclipse timing ==
=== Places experiencing partial eclipse ===
Solar Eclipse of September 2, 1997 (Local Times)
Country or territory	City or place	Start of partial eclipse	Maximum eclipse	End of partial eclipse	Duration of eclipse (hr:min)	Maximum coverage
Australia	Darwin	07:30:24	07:57:49	08:26:59	0:57	1.91%
Australia	Tennant Creek	07:16:46	08:08:45	09:07:07	1:50	13.68%
Australia	Carnarvon	06:36:26 (sunrise)	06:38:48	07:32:12	0:56	20.74%
Australia	Alice Springs	07:15:00	08:14:18	09:21:47	2:07	21.76%
Australia	Cairns	07:57:43	08:46:58	09:41:37	1:44	7.74%
Australia	Perth	06:32:32 (sunrise)	06:47:29	07:54:00	1:21	36.59%
Australia	Adelaide	07:23:28	08:38:06	10:03:36	2:40	44.12%
Australia	Eucla	06:31:55	07:38:08	08:53:51	2:22	38.27%
Australia	Samford	08:01:50	09:15:23	10:38:09	2:36	24.14%
Australia	Brisbane	08:02:05	09:15:49	10:38:45	2:37	24.24%
Australia	Melbourne	08:01:45	09:21:52	10:52:32	2:51	47.53%
Australia	Canberra	08:02:56	09:23:33	10:54:26	2:52	41.05%
Australia	Bowral	08:03:35	09:24:12	10:54:53	2:51	38.89%
Australia	Sydney	08:03:57	09:24:24	10:54:47	2:51	37.31%
Australia	Wollongong	08:04:08	09:24:54	10:55:39	2:52	38.52%
Australia	Traralgon	08:03:45	09:24:55	10:56:24	2:53	47.53%
Australia	Kiama	08:04:21	09:25:17	10:56:13	2:52	39.00%
Vanuatu	Port Vila	10:03:55	10:29:04	10:54:53	0:51	0.46%
New Caledonia	Nouméa	09:36:36	10:33:27	11:33:35	1:57	6.37%
Australia	Hobart	08:11:24	09:34:52	11:07:34	2:56	54.99%
Australia	Lord Howe Island	08:44:38	10:04:55	11:32:48	2:48	27.71%
Norfolk Island	Kingston	10:05:42	11:19:37	12:37:08	2:31	15.61%
Antarctica	Casey Station	07:43:25 (sunrise)	07:53:04	09:05:43	1:22	82.43%
New Zealand	Oban	10:47:51	12:17:00	13:47:37	3:00	46.16%
New Zealand	Auckland	10:56:41	12:17:56	13:39:05	2:42	22.19%
New Zealand	Christchurch	10:54:12	12:21:47	13:49:24	2:55	36.19%
New Zealand	Tauranga	11:01:04	12:22:10	13:42:33	2:41	22.20%
New Zealand	Wellington	10:58:07	12:23:34	13:48:26	2:50	30.06%
New Zealand	Palmerston North	10:59:59	12:24:14	13:47:40	2:48	27.53%
New Zealand	Chatham Islands	12:07:14	13:28:25	14:46:09	2:39	26.26%

== Eclipse details ==
Shown below are two tables displaying details about this particular solar eclipse. The first table outlines times at which the Moon's penumbra or umbra attains the specific parameter, and the second table describes various other parameters pertaining to this eclipse.

September 2, 1997 Solar Eclipse Times
Event	Time (UTC)
First Penumbral External Contact	1997 September 1 at 21:45:07.4 UTC
Ecliptic Conjunction	1997 September 1 at 23:52:37.0 UTC
Greatest Eclipse	1997 September 2 at 00:04:48.3 UTC
Equatorial Conjunction	1997 September 2 at 00:41:05.5 UTC
Last Penumbral External Contact	1997 September 2 at 02:24:13.5 UTC

September 2, 1997 Solar Eclipse Parameters
Parameter	Value
Eclipse Magnitude	0.89877
Eclipse Obscuration	0.83755
Gamma	−1.03521
Sun Right Ascension	10h44m31.4s
Sun Declination	+07°58'50.9"
Sun Semi-Diameter	15'51.1"
Sun Equatorial Horizontal Parallax	08.7"
Moon Right Ascension	10h43m27.8s
Moon Declination	+07°05'23.6"
Moon Semi-Diameter	14'42.5"
Moon Equatorial Horizontal Parallax	0°53'58.8"
ΔT	62.7 s

== Eclipse season ==
This eclipse is part of an eclipse season, a period, roughly every six months, when eclipses occur. Only two (or occasionally three) eclipse seasons occur each year, and each season lasts about 35 days and repeats just short of six months (173 days) later; thus two full eclipse seasons always occur each year. Either two or three eclipses happen each eclipse season. In the sequence below, each eclipse is separated by a fortnight.

Eclipse season of September 1997
September 2 Ascending node (new moon)	September 16 Descending node (full moon)
Partial solar eclipse Solar Saros 125	Total lunar eclipse Lunar Saros 137

== Related eclipses ==
=== Eclipses in 1997 ===
- A total solar eclipse on March 9.
- A partial lunar eclipse on March 24.
- A partial solar eclipse on September 2.
- A total lunar eclipse on September 16.

=== Metonic ===
- Preceded by: Solar eclipse of November 13, 1993
- Followed by: Solar eclipse of June 21, 2001

=== Tzolkinex ===
- Preceded by: Solar eclipse of July 22, 1990
- Followed by: Solar eclipse of October 14, 2004

=== Half-Saros ===
- Preceded by: Lunar eclipse of August 27, 1988
- Followed by: Lunar eclipse of September 7, 2006

=== Tritos ===
- Preceded by: Solar eclipse of October 3, 1986
- Followed by: Solar eclipse of August 1, 2008

=== Solar Saros 125 ===
- Preceded by: Solar eclipse of August 22, 1979
- Followed by: Solar eclipse of September 13, 2015

=== Inex ===
- Preceded by: Solar eclipse of September 22, 1968
- Followed by: Solar eclipse of August 12, 2026

=== Triad ===
- Preceded by: Solar eclipse of November 2, 1910
- Followed by: Solar eclipse of July 3, 2084

=== Solar eclipses of 1997–2000 ===
This eclipse is a member of a semester series. An eclipse in a semester series of solar eclipses repeats approximately every 177 days and 4 hours (a semester) at alternating nodes of the Moon's orbit.

The partial solar eclipses on July 1, 2000 and December 25, 2000 occur in the next lunar year eclipse set.

Solar eclipse series sets from 1997 to 2000
Descending node			Ascending node		
Saros	Map	Gamma	Saros	Map	Gamma
120 Totality in Chita, Russia	March 9, 1997 Total	0.9183	125	September 2, 1997 Partial	−1.0352
130 Totality near Guadeloupe	February 26, 1998 Total	0.2391	135	August 22, 1998 Annular	−0.2644
140	February 16, 1999 Annular	−0.4726	145 Totality in France	August 11, 1999 Total	0.5062
150	February 5, 2000 Partial	−1.2233	155	July 31, 2000 Partial	1.2166

=== Saros 125 ===
This eclipse is a part of Saros series 125, repeating every 18 years, 11 days, and containing 73 events. The series started with a partial solar eclipse on February 4, 1060. It contains total eclipses from June 13, 1276 through July 16, 1330; hybrid eclipses on July 26, 1348 and August 7, 1366; and annular eclipses from August 17, 1384 through August 22, 1979. The series ends at member 73 as a partial eclipse on April 9, 2358. Its eclipses are tabulated in three columns; every third eclipse in the same column is one exeligmos apart, so they all cast shadows over approximately the same parts of the Earth.

The longest duration of totality was produced by member 14 at 1 minutes, 11 seconds on June 25, 1294, and the longest duration of annularity was produced by member 48 at 7 minutes, 23 seconds on July 10, 1907. All eclipses in this series occur at the Moon’s ascending node of orbit.

Series members 43–64 occur between 1801 and 2200:
43	44	45
May 16, 1817	May 27, 1835	June 6, 1853
46	47	48
June 18, 1871	June 28, 1889	July 10, 1907
49	50	51
July 20, 1925	August 1, 1943	August 11, 1961
52	53	54
August 22, 1979	September 2, 1997	September 13, 2015
55	56	57
September 23, 2033	October 4, 2051	October 15, 2069
58	59	60
October 26, 2087	November 6, 2105	November 18, 2123
61	62	63
November 28, 2141	December 9, 2159	December 20, 2177
64
December 31, 2195

=== Metonic series ===
The metonic series repeats eclipses every 19 years (6939.69 days), lasting about 5 cycles. Eclipses occur in nearly the same calendar date. In addition, the octon subseries repeats 1/5 of that or every 3.8 years (1387.94 days). All eclipses in this table occur at the Moon's ascending node.

21 eclipse events between June 21, 1982 and June 21, 2058
June 21	April 8–9	January 26	November 13–14	September 1–2
117	119	121	123	125
June 21, 1982	April 9, 1986	January 26, 1990	November 13, 1993	September 2, 1997
127	129	131	133	135
June 21, 2001	April 8, 2005	January 26, 2009	November 13, 2012	September 1, 2016
137	139	141	143	145
June 21, 2020	April 8, 2024	January 26, 2028	November 14, 2031	September 2, 2035
147	149	151	153	155
June 21, 2039	April 9, 2043	January 26, 2047	November 14, 2050	September 2, 2054
157
June 21, 2058

=== Tritos series ===
This eclipse is a part of a tritos cycle, repeating at alternating nodes every 135 synodic months (≈ 3986.63 days, or 11 years minus 1 month). Their appearance and longitude are irregular due to a lack of synchronization with the anomalistic month (period of perigee), but groupings of 3 tritos cycles (≈ 33 years minus 3 months) come close (≈ 434.044 anomalistic months), so eclipses are similar in these groupings.

Series members between 1801 and 2200
March 14, 1801 (Saros 107)	February 12, 1812 (Saros 108)	January 12, 1823 (Saros 109)		November 10, 1844 (Saros 111)
		August 9, 1877 (Saros 114)	July 9, 1888 (Saros 115)	June 8, 1899 (Saros 116)
May 9, 1910 (Saros 117)	April 8, 1921 (Saros 118)	March 7, 1932 (Saros 119)	February 4, 1943 (Saros 120)	January 5, 1954 (Saros 121)
December 4, 1964 (Saros 122)	November 3, 1975 (Saros 123)	October 3, 1986 (Saros 124)	September 2, 1997 (Saros 125)	August 1, 2008 (Saros 126)
July 2, 2019 (Saros 127)	June 1, 2030 (Saros 128)	April 30, 2041 (Saros 129)	March 30, 2052 (Saros 130)	February 28, 2063 (Saros 131)
January 27, 2074 (Saros 132)	December 27, 2084 (Saros 133)	November 27, 2095 (Saros 134)	October 26, 2106 (Saros 135)	September 26, 2117 (Saros 136)
August 25, 2128 (Saros 137)	July 25, 2139 (Saros 138)	June 25, 2150 (Saros 139)	May 25, 2161 (Saros 140)	April 23, 2172 (Saros 141)
March 23, 2183 (Saros 142)	February 21, 2194 (Saros 143)			

=== Inex series ===
This eclipse is a part of the long period inex cycle, repeating at alternating nodes, every 358 synodic months (≈ 10,571.95 days, or 29 years minus 20 days). Their appearance and longitude are irregular due to a lack of synchronization with the anomalistic month (period of perigee). However, groupings of 3 inex cycles (≈ 87 years minus 2 months) comes close (≈ 1,151.02 anomalistic months), so eclipses are similar in these groupings.

Series members between 1801 and 2200
January 1, 1824 (Saros 119)	December 11, 1852 (Saros 120)	November 21, 1881 (Saros 121)
November 2, 1910 (Saros 122)	October 12, 1939 (Saros 123)	September 22, 1968 (Saros 124)
September 2, 1997 (Saros 125)	August 12, 2026 (Saros 126)	July 24, 2055 (Saros 127)
July 3, 2084 (Saros 128)	June 13, 2113 (Saros 129)	May 25, 2142 (Saros 130)
May 5, 2171 (Saros 131)	April 14, 2200 (Saros 132)	
