= Solar eclipse of December 24, 1992 =

20th-century partial solar eclipse

- Partial eclipse
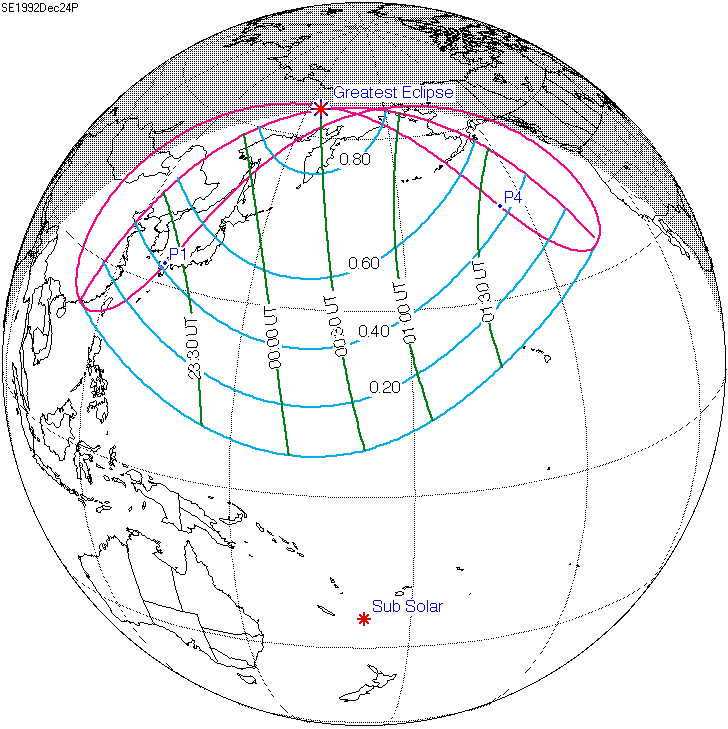
- Map
- Gamma: 1.0711
- Magnitude: 0.8422

Maximum eclipse
- Coordinates: 65.7°N 155.7°E

Times (UTC)
- Greatest eclipse: 0:31:41

References
- Saros: 151 (13 of 72)
- Catalog # (SE5000): 9492

A partial solar eclipse occurred at the Moon's ascending node of orbit between Wednesday, December 23 and Thursday, December 24, 1992, with a magnitude of 0.8422. A solar eclipse occurs when the Moon passes between Earth and the Sun, thereby totally or partly obscuring the image of the Sun for a viewer on Earth. A partial solar eclipse occurs in the polar regions of the Earth when the center of the Moon's shadow misses the Earth.

A partial eclipse was visible for parts of East Asia, Northeast Asia, and Alaska.

== Eclipse timing ==
=== Places experiencing partial eclipse ===
Solar Eclipse of December 24, 1992 (Local Times)
Country or territory	City or place	Start of partial eclipse	Maximum eclipse	End of partial eclipse	Duration of eclipse (hr:min)	Maximum coverage
Hong Kong	Hong Kong	07:02:12	07:06:35	07:07:32	0:08	0.01%
China	Shenzhen	07:00:42 (sunrise)	07:06:35	07:12:20	0:12	0.04%
Taiwan	Taipei	06:36:03 (sunrise)	07:09:59	07:51:56	1:16	6.59%
China	Suzhou	06:53:42 (sunrise)	07:14:38	08:10:37	1:17	17.00%
China	Shanghai	06:50:01 (sunrise)	07:15:04	08:12:06	1:22	17.59%
South Korea	Seoul	07:44:33 (sunrise)	08:25:49	09:38:17	1:54	35.25%
North Korea	Pyongyang	07:53:39 (sunrise)	08:26:34	09:38:58	1:45	37.02%
Guam	Hagåtña	08:49:56	09:30:45	10:15:00	1:25	3.61%
Japan	Osaka	07:21:28	08:31:30	09:51:13	2:30	37.12%
Japan	Kyoto	07:21:38	08:32:10	09:52:26	2:31	38.00%
Northern Mariana Islands	Saipan	08:43:35	09:33:10	10:27:44	1:44	6.66%
China	Beijing	07:33:50 (sunrise)	07:37:09	08:25:17	0:51	26.57%
Russia	Vladivostok	08:42:13 (sunrise)	09:37:24	10:58:04	2:16	49.92%
Japan	Yokohama	07:23:13	08:37:46	10:02:32	2:39	41.94%
Japan	Tokyo	07:23:23	08:38:12	10:03:13	2:40	42.49%
Japan	Sapporo	07:29:50	08:48:57	10:17:16	2:47	56.66%
Russia	Komsomolsk-on-Amur	08:51:48 (sunrise)	09:53:08	11:17:34	2:26	64.59%
Russia	Yuzhno-Sakhalinsk	09:35:14	10:55:43	12:24:18	2:49	63.17%
Federated States of Micronesia	Palikir	10:42:21	10:56:07	11:10:06	0:28	0.08%
Mongolia	Choibalsan	09:10:35 (sunrise)	09:14:36	09:40:27	0:30	16.36%
Russia	Magadan	09:59:41	11:20:28	12:44:40	2:49	76.57%
United States Minor Outlying Islands	Wake Island	11:04:10	12:23:20	13:44:02	2:40	18.45%
Russia	Petropavlovsk-Kamchatsky	10:59:25	12:26:09	13:55:38	2:56	73.22%
United States	Anchorage (Note: The times listed for this location occur on December 23, 1992, local time.)	15:11:13	15:35:34	15:43:09 (sunset)	0:32	15.99%
Russia	Chita	09:33:21 (sunrise)	09:37:55	09:47:10	0:14	4.00%
Russia	Anadyr	11:32:18	12:52:30	14:02:46 (sunset)	2:30	73.93%
Russia	Yakutsk	09:46:15 (sunrise)	09:54:32	10:20:50	0:35	19.33%
United States	Adak	13:38:06	15:05:21	16:27:40	2:50	61.89%
United States Minor Outlying Islands	Midway Atoll	12:44:27	14:07:11	15:23:07	2:39	23.92%
United States	Unalaska	14:55:20	16:17:04	17:33:05	2:38	56.14%

== Eclipse details ==
Shown below are two tables displaying details about this particular solar eclipse. The first table outlines times at which the Moon's penumbra or umbra attains the specific parameter, and the second table describes various other parameters pertaining to this eclipse.

December 24, 1992 Solar Eclipse Times
Event	Time (UTC)
First Penumbral External Contact	1992 December 23 at 22:21:43.1 UTC
Greatest Eclipse	1992 December 24 at 00:31:41.3 UTC
Ecliptic Conjunction	1992 December 24 at 00:43:50.0 UTC
Equatorial Conjunction	1992 December 24 at 00:46:08.3 UTC
Last Penumbral External Contact	1992 December 24 at 02:41:38.9 UTC

December 24, 1992 Solar Eclipse Parameters
Parameter	Value
Eclipse Magnitude	0.84220
Eclipse Obscuration	0.77919
Gamma	1.07106
Sun Right Ascension	18h10m41.8s
Sun Declination	-23°25'00.8"
Sun Semi-Diameter	16'15.6"
Sun Equatorial Horizontal Parallax	08.9"
Moon Right Ascension	18h10m11.4s
Moon Declination	-22°25'35.5"
Moon Semi-Diameter	15'15.7"
Moon Equatorial Horizontal Parallax	0°56'00.6"
ΔT	59.1 s

== Eclipse season ==
This eclipse is part of an eclipse season, a period, roughly every six months, when eclipses occur. Only two (or occasionally three) eclipse seasons occur each year, and each season lasts about 35 days and repeats just short of six months (173 days) later; thus two full eclipse seasons always occur each year. Either two or three eclipses happen each eclipse season. In the sequence below, each eclipse is separated by a fortnight.

Eclipse season of December 1992
December 9 Descending node (full moon)	December 24 Ascending node (new moon)
Total lunar eclipse Lunar Saros 125	Partial solar eclipse Solar Saros 151

== Related eclipses ==
=== Eclipses in 1992 ===
- An annular solar eclipse on January 4.
- A partial lunar eclipse on June 15.
- A total solar eclipse on June 30.
- A total lunar eclipse on December 9.
- A partial solar eclipse on December 24.

=== Metonic ===
- Preceded by: Solar eclipse of March 7, 1989
- Followed by: Solar eclipse of October 12, 1996

=== Tzolkinex ===
- Preceded by: Solar eclipse of November 12, 1985
- Followed by: Solar eclipse of February 5, 2000

=== Half-Saros ===
- Preceded by: Lunar eclipse of December 20, 1983
- Followed by: Lunar eclipse of December 30, 2001

=== Tritos ===
- Preceded by: Solar eclipse of January 25, 1982
- Followed by: Solar eclipse of November 23, 2003

=== Solar Saros 151 ===
- Preceded by: Solar eclipse of December 13, 1974
- Followed by: Solar eclipse of January 4, 2011

=== Inex ===
- Preceded by: Solar eclipse of January 14, 1964
- Followed by: Solar eclipse of December 4, 2021

=== Triad ===
- Preceded by: Solar eclipse of February 23, 1906
- Followed by: Solar eclipse of October 24, 2079

=== Solar eclipses of 1990–1992 ===
This eclipse is a member of a semester series. An eclipse in a semester series of solar eclipses repeats approximately every 177 days and 4 hours (a semester) at alternating nodes of the Moon's orbit.

Solar eclipse series sets from 1990 to 1992
Ascending node			Descending node		
Saros	Map	Gamma	Saros	Map	Gamma
121	January 26, 1990 Annular	−0.9457	126 Partial in Finland	July 22, 1990 Total	0.7597
131	January 15, 1991 Annular	−0.2727	136 Totality in Playas del Coco, Costa Rica	July 11, 1991 Total	−0.0041
141	January 4, 1992 Annular	0.4091	146	June 30, 1992 Total	−0.7512
151	December 24, 1992 Partial	1.0711			

=== Saros 151 ===
This eclipse is a part of Saros series 151, repeating every 18 years, 11 days, and containing 72 events. The series started with a partial solar eclipse on August 14, 1776. It contains annular eclipses from February 28, 2101 through April 23, 2191; a hybrid eclipse on May 5, 2209; and total eclipses from May 16, 2227 through July 6, 2912. The series ends at member 72 as a partial eclipse on October 1, 3056. Its eclipses are tabulated in three columns; every third eclipse in the same column is one exeligmos apart, so they all cast shadows over approximately the same parts of the Earth.

The longest duration of annularity will be produced by member 19 at 2 minutes, 44 seconds on February 28, 2101, and the longest duration of totality will be produced by member 60 at 5 minutes, 41 seconds on May 22, 2840. All eclipses in this series occur at the Moon’s ascending node of orbit.

Series members 3–24 occur between 1801 and 2200:
3	4	5
September 5, 1812	September 17, 1830	September 27, 1848
6	7	8
October 8, 1866	October 19, 1884	October 31, 1902
9	10	11
November 10, 1920	November 21, 1938	December 2, 1956
12	13	14
December 13, 1974	December 24, 1992	January 4, 2011
15	16	17
January 14, 2029	January 26, 2047	February 5, 2065
18	19	20
February 16, 2083	February 28, 2101	March 11, 2119
21	22	23
March 21, 2137	April 2, 2155	April 12, 2173
24
April 23, 2191

=== Metonic series ===
The metonic series repeats eclipses every 19 years (6939.69 days), lasting about 5 cycles. Eclipses occur in nearly the same calendar date. In addition, the octon subseries repeats 1/5 of that or every 3.8 years (1387.94 days). All eclipses in this table occur at the Moon's ascending node.

22 eclipse events between December 24, 1916 and July 31, 2000
December 24–25	October 12	July 31–August 1	May 19–20	March 7
111	113	115	117	119
December 24, 1916		July 31, 1924	May 19, 1928	March 7, 1932
121	123	125	127	129
December 25, 1935	October 12, 1939	August 1, 1943	May 20, 1947	March 7, 1951
131	133	135	137	139
December 25, 1954	October 12, 1958	July 31, 1962	May 20, 1966	March 7, 1970
141	143	145	147	149
December 24, 1973	October 12, 1977	July 31, 1981	May 19, 1985	March 7, 1989
151	153	155		
December 24, 1992	October 12, 1996	July 31, 2000		

=== Tritos series ===
This eclipse is a part of a tritos cycle, repeating at alternating nodes every 135 synodic months (≈ 3986.63 days, or 11 years minus 1 month). Their appearance and longitude are irregular due to a lack of synchronization with the anomalistic month (period of perigee), but groupings of 3 tritos cycles (≈ 33 years minus 3 months) come close (≈ 434.044 anomalistic months), so eclipses are similar in these groupings.

The partial solar eclipses on November 16, 2134 (part of Saros 164) and October 16, 2145 (part of Saros 165) are also a part of this series but are not included in the table below.

Series members between 1801 and 2069
June 6, 1807 (Saros 134)	May 5, 1818 (Saros 135)	April 3, 1829 (Saros 136)	March 4, 1840 (Saros 137)	February 1, 1851 (Saros 138)
December 31, 1861 (Saros 139)	November 30, 1872 (Saros 140)	October 30, 1883 (Saros 141)	September 29, 1894 (Saros 142)	August 30, 1905 (Saros 143)
July 30, 1916 (Saros 144)	June 29, 1927 (Saros 145)	May 29, 1938 (Saros 146)	April 28, 1949 (Saros 147)	March 27, 1960 (Saros 148)
February 25, 1971 (Saros 149)	January 25, 1982 (Saros 150)	December 24, 1992 (Saros 151)	November 23, 2003 (Saros 152)	October 23, 2014 (Saros 153)
September 21, 2025 (Saros 154)	August 21, 2036 (Saros 155)	July 22, 2047 (Saros 156)	June 21, 2058 (Saros 157)	May 20, 2069 (Saros 158)

=== Inex series ===
This eclipse is a part of the long period inex cycle, repeating at alternating nodes, every 358 synodic months (≈ 10,571.95 days, or 29 years minus 20 days). Their appearance and longitude are irregular due to a lack of synchronization with the anomalistic month (period of perigee). However, groupings of 3 inex cycles (≈ 87 years minus 2 months) comes close (≈ 1,151.02 anomalistic months), so eclipses are similar in these groupings.

Series members between 1801 and 2200
April 24, 1819 (Saros 145)	April 3, 1848 (Saros 146)	March 15, 1877 (Saros 147)
February 23, 1906 (Saros 148)	February 3, 1935 (Saros 149)	January 14, 1964 (Saros 150)
December 24, 1992 (Saros 151)	December 4, 2021 (Saros 152)	November 14, 2050 (Saros 153)
October 24, 2079 (Saros 154)	October 5, 2108 (Saros 155)	September 15, 2137 (Saros 156)
August 25, 2166 (Saros 157)	August 5, 2195 (Saros 158)	
