= Solar eclipse of July 12, 2094 =

Future partial solar eclipse

- Partial eclipse
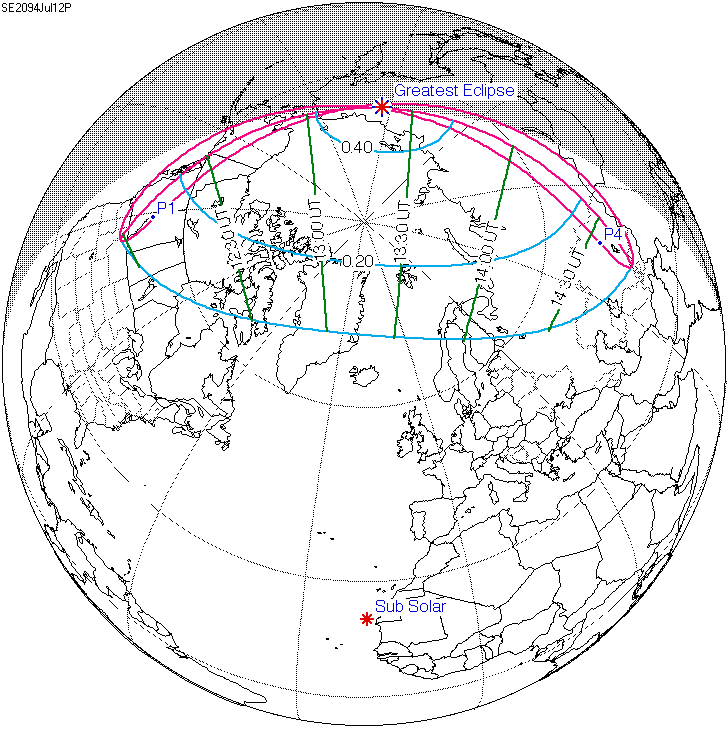
- Map
- Gamma: 1.3150
- Magnitude: 0.4224

Maximum eclipse
- Coordinates: 68°N 52.8°E

Times (UTC)
- Greatest eclipse: 13:24:35

References
- Saros: 157 (3 of 70)
- Catalog # (SE5000): 9720

A partial solar eclipse will occur at the Moon's ascending node of orbit on Monday, July 12, 2094, with a magnitude of 0.4224. A solar eclipse occurs when the Moon passes between Earth and the Sun, thereby totally or partly obscuring the image of the Sun for a viewer on Earth. A partial solar eclipse occurs in the polar regions of the Earth when the center of the Moon's shadow misses the Earth.

This will be the third of four solar eclipses in 2094, with the others occurring on January 16, June 13, and December 7.

The partial solar eclipse will be visible for parts of northern North America, Scandinavia, and Russia.

== Eclipse details ==
Shown below are two tables displaying details about this particular solar eclipse. The first table outlines times at which the Moon's penumbra or umbra attains the specific parameter, and the second table describes various other parameters pertaining to this eclipse.

July 12, 2094 Solar Eclipse Times
Event	Time (UTC)
First Penumbral External Contact	2094 July 12 at 11:46:47.0 UTC
Equatorial Conjunction	2094 July 12 at 13:16:11.9 UTC
Greatest Eclipse	2094 July 12 at 13:24:34.9 UTC
Ecliptic Conjunction	2094 July 12 at 13:39:38.8 UTC
Last Penumbral External Contact	2094 July 12 at 15:02:30.3 UTC

July 12, 2094 Solar Eclipse Parameters
Parameter	Value
Eclipse Magnitude	0.42247
Eclipse Obscuration	0.30296
Gamma	1.31495
Sun Right Ascension	07h29m49.1s
Sun Declination	+21°49'23.2"
Sun Semi-Diameter	15'43.9"
Sun Equatorial Horizontal Parallax	08.7"
Moon Right Ascension	07h30m06.1s
Moon Declination	+23°01'02.4"
Moon Semi-Diameter	14'54.5"
Moon Equatorial Horizontal Parallax	0°54'43.0"
ΔT	118.3 s

== Eclipse season ==
This eclipse is part of an eclipse season, a period, roughly every six months, when eclipses occur. Only two (or occasionally three) eclipse seasons occur each year, and each season lasts about 35 days and repeats just short of six months (173 days) later; thus two full eclipse seasons always occur each year. Either two or three eclipses happen each eclipse season. In the sequence below, each eclipse is separated by a fortnight. The first and last eclipse in this sequence is separated by one synodic month.

Eclipse season of June–July 2094
June 13 Ascending node (new moon)	June 28 Descending node (full moon)	July 12 Ascending node (new moon)
Partial solar eclipse Solar Saros 119	Total lunar eclipse Lunar Saros 131	Partial solar eclipse Solar Saros 157

== Related eclipses ==
=== Eclipses in 2094 ===
- A partial lunar eclipse on January 1.
- A total solar eclipse on January 16.
- A partial solar eclipse on June 13.
- A total lunar eclipse on June 28.
- A partial solar eclipse on July 12.
- A partial solar eclipse on December 7.
- A total lunar eclipse on December 21.

=== Metonic ===
- Preceded by: Solar eclipse of September 23, 2090

=== Tzolkinex ===
- Preceded by: Solar eclipse of June 1, 2087
- Followed by: Solar eclipse of August 24, 2101

=== Half-Saros ===
- Preceded by: Lunar eclipse of July 7, 2085
- Followed by: Lunar eclipse of July 19, 2103

=== Tritos ===
- Preceded by: Solar eclipse of August 13, 2083
- Followed by: Solar eclipse of June 12, 2105

=== Solar Saros 157 ===
- Preceded by: Solar eclipse of July 1, 2076
- Followed by: Solar eclipse of July 23, 2112

=== Inex ===
- Preceded by: Solar eclipse of August 2, 2065
- Followed by: Solar eclipse of June 23, 2123

=== Triad ===
- Preceded by: Solar eclipse of September 11, 2007
- Followed by: Solar eclipse of May 13, 2181

=== Solar eclipses of 2091–2094 ===
This eclipse is a member of a semester series. An eclipse in a semester series of solar eclipses repeats approximately every 177 days and 4 hours (a semester) at alternating nodes of the Moon's orbit.

The partial solar eclipses on June 13, 2094 and December 7, 2094 occur in the next lunar year eclipse set.

Solar eclipse series sets from 2091 to 2094
Descending node			Ascending node		
Saros	Map	Gamma	Saros	Map	Gamma
122	February 18, 2091 Partial	1.1779	127	August 15, 2091 Total	−0.949
132	February 7, 2092 Annular	0.4322	137	August 3, 2092 Annular	−0.2044
142	January 27, 2093 Total	−0.2737	147	July 23, 2093 Annular	0.5717
152	January 16, 2094 Total	−0.9333	157	July 12, 2094 Partial	1.3150

=== Saros 157 ===
This eclipse is a part of Saros series 157, repeating every 18 years, 11 days, and containing 70 events. The series will start with a partial solar eclipse on June 21, 2058. It contains annular eclipses from August 25, 2166 through March 10, 2491; hybrid eclipses from March 22, 2509 through April 12, 2545; and total eclipses from April 24, 2563 through April 21, 3158. The series ends at member 70 as a partial eclipse on July 17, 3302. Its eclipses are tabulated in three columns; every third eclipse in the same column is one exeligmos apart, so they all cast shadows over approximately the same parts of the Earth.

The longest duration of annularity will be produced by member 15 at 4 minutes, 16 seconds on November 22, 2310, and the longest duration of totality will be produced by member 38 at 5 minutes, 57 seconds on July 31, 2725. All eclipses in this series occur at the Moon’s ascending node of orbit.

Series members 1–8 occur between 2058 and 2200:
1	2	3
June 21, 2058	July 1, 2076	July 12, 2094
4	5	6
July 23, 2112	August 4, 2130	August 14, 2148
7	8	
August 25, 2166	September 4, 2184	

=== Metonic series ===
The metonic series repeats eclipses every 19 years (6939.69 days), lasting about 5 cycles. Eclipses occur in nearly the same calendar date. In addition, the octon subseries repeats 1/5 of that or every 3.8 years (1387.94 days). All eclipses in this table occur at the Moon's ascending node.

21 eclipse events between July 13, 2018 and July 12, 2094
July 12–13	April 30–May 1	February 16–17	December 5–6	September 22–23
117	119	121	123	125
July 13, 2018	April 30, 2022	February 17, 2026	December 5, 2029	September 23, 2033
127	129	131	133	135
July 13, 2037	April 30, 2041	February 16, 2045	December 5, 2048	September 22, 2052
137	139	141	143	145
July 12, 2056	April 30, 2060	February 17, 2064	December 6, 2067	September 23, 2071
147	149	151	153	155
July 13, 2075	May 1, 2079	February 16, 2083	December 6, 2086	September 23, 2090
157
July 12, 2094

=== Tritos series ===
This eclipse is a part of a tritos cycle, repeating at alternating nodes every 135 synodic months (≈ 3986.63 days, or 11 years minus 1 month). Their appearance and longitude are irregular due to a lack of synchronization with the anomalistic month (period of perigee), but groupings of 3 tritos cycles (≈ 33 years minus 3 months) come close (≈ 434.044 anomalistic months), so eclipses are similar in these groupings.

The partial solar eclipses on December 7, 2170 (part of Saros 164) and November 7, 2181 (part of Saros 165) are also a part of this series but are not included in the table below.

Series members between 1801 and 2105
September 28, 1810 (Saros 131)	August 27, 1821 (Saros 132)	July 27, 1832 (Saros 133)	June 27, 1843 (Saros 134)	May 26, 1854 (Saros 135)
April 25, 1865 (Saros 136)	March 25, 1876 (Saros 137)	February 22, 1887 (Saros 138)	January 22, 1898 (Saros 139)	December 23, 1908 (Saros 140)
November 22, 1919 (Saros 141)	October 21, 1930 (Saros 142)	September 21, 1941 (Saros 143)	August 20, 1952 (Saros 144)	July 20, 1963 (Saros 145)
June 20, 1974 (Saros 146)	May 19, 1985 (Saros 147)	April 17, 1996 (Saros 148)	March 19, 2007 (Saros 149)	February 15, 2018 (Saros 150)
January 14, 2029 (Saros 151)	December 15, 2039 (Saros 152)	November 14, 2050 (Saros 153)	October 13, 2061 (Saros 154)	September 12, 2072 (Saros 155)
August 13, 2083 (Saros 156)	July 12, 2094 (Saros 157)	June 12, 2105 (Saros 158)		

=== Inex series ===
This eclipse is a part of the long period inex cycle, repeating at alternating nodes, every 358 synodic months (≈ 10,571.95 days, or 29 years minus 20 days). Their appearance and longitude are irregular due to a lack of synchronization with the anomalistic month (period of perigee). However, groupings of 3 inex cycles (≈ 87 years minus 2 months) comes close (≈ 1,151.02 anomalistic months), so eclipses are similar in these groupings.

Series members between 1801 and 2200
January 30, 1805 (Saros 147)	January 9, 1834 (Saros 148)	December 21, 1862 (Saros 149)
December 1, 1891 (Saros 150)	November 10, 1920 (Saros 151)	October 21, 1949 (Saros 152)
October 2, 1978 (Saros 153)	September 11, 2007 (Saros 154)	August 21, 2036 (Saros 155)
August 2, 2065 (Saros 156)	July 12, 2094 (Saros 157)	June 23, 2123 (Saros 158)
June 3, 2152 (Saros 159)	May 13, 2181 (Saros 160)	
