= Solar eclipse of August 21, 2036 =

Future partial solar eclipse

- Partial eclipse
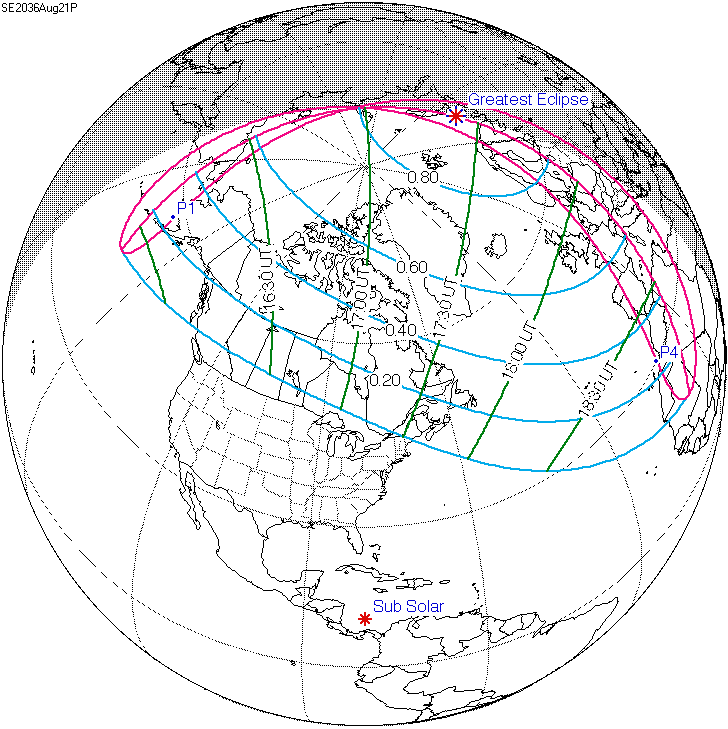
- Map
- Gamma: 1.0825
- Magnitude: 0.8622

Maximum eclipse
- Coordinates: 71.1°N 47°E

Times (UTC)
- Greatest eclipse: 17:25:45

References
- Saros: 155 (7 of 71)
- Catalog # (SE5000): 9589

A partial solar eclipse will occur at the Moon's ascending node of orbit on Thursday, August 21, 2036, with a magnitude of 0.8622. A solar eclipse occurs when the Moon passes between Earth and the Sun, thereby totally or partly obscuring the image of the Sun for a viewer on Earth. A partial solar eclipse occurs in the polar regions of the Earth when the center of the Moon's shadow misses the Earth.

A partial eclipse will be visible for parts of the Russian Far East, Alaska, Canada, Greenland, Western Europe, and Northwest Africa.

== Images ==
Animated path

== Eclipse timing ==
=== Places experiencing partial eclipse ===
Solar Eclipse of August 21, 2036 (Local Times)
Country or territory	City or place	Start of partial eclipse	Maximum eclipse	End of partial eclipse	Duration of eclipse (hr:min)	Maximum coverage
Canada	Alert	12:07:38	13:02:37	13:57:23	1:50	64.68%
Greenland	Pituffik	13:07:47	14:03:51	14:59:38	1:52	55.41%
Russia	Belushya Guba	19:32:28	20:12:37	20:21:35 (sunset)	0:49	72.20%
Greenland	Danmarkshavn	16:24:26	17:20:12	18:14:49	1:50	71.94%
Russia	Murmansk	19:41:01	20:31:55	21:12:44 (sunset)	1:32	83.11%
Norway	Tromsø	18:41:27	19:33:59	20:24:59	1:44	81.19%
Iceland	Reykjavík	16:45:08	17:42:03	18:36:34	1:51	62.65%
Poland	Warsaw	19:11:54	19:43:11	19:46:52 (sunset)	0:35	47.78%
Latvia	Riga	20:03:07	20:43:21	20:47:33 (sunset)	0:44	66.40%
Finland	Helsinki	19:57:27	20:47:32	20:55:26 (sunset)	0:58	77.80%
Estonia	Tallinn	19:58:44	20:47:55	20:53:28 (sunset)	0:55	77.09%
Faroe Islands	Tórshavn	17:53:56	18:48:54	19:41:24	1:47	68.82%
Åland Islands	Mariehamn	19:58:26	20:49:12	21:15:07 (sunset)	1:17	76.76%
Sweden	Stockholm	19:00:03	19:50:55	20:19:44 (sunset)	1:20	75.68%
Lithuania	Klaipėda	20:05:53	20:51:35	20:55:39 (sunset)	0:50	71.29%
Norway	Oslo	18:59:35	19:51:39	20:41:32	1:42	74.12%
Austria	Vienna	19:20:04	19:53:04	19:56:25 (sunset)	0:36	47.52%
Denmark	Copenhagen	19:07:17	19:58:06	20:29:45 (sunset)	1:22	70.53%
Germany	Berlin	19:12:56	20:02:44	20:18:02 (sunset)	1:05	66.93%
Isle of Man	Douglas	18:09:56	19:02:59	19:53:16	1:43	61.60%
Ireland	Dublin	18:11:18	19:04:23	19:54:38	1:43	59.60%
Czech Republic	Prague	19:17:09	20:04:42	20:08:12 (sunset)	0:51	63.74%
Netherlands	Amsterdam	19:13:57	20:05:02	20:51:34 (sunset)	1:38	63.69%
United Kingdom	London	18:15:36	19:07:11	19:56:04	1:40	60.26%
Belgium	Brussels	19:16:54	20:07:34	20:50:07 (sunset)	1:33	61.36%
Luxembourg	Luxembourg	19:19:10	20:09:07	20:40:17 (sunset)	1:21	60.29%
France	Paris	19:20:50	20:11:06	20:53:46 (sunset)	1:33	57.54%
Switzerland	Zurich	19:23:09	20:11:52	20:26:02 (sunset)	1:03	57.74%
Monaco	Monaco	19:30:13	20:17:28	20:23:51 (sunset)	0:54	51.14%
Spain	Madrid	19:38:22	20:25:07	21:02:57 (sunset)	1:25	39.98%

== Eclipse details ==
Shown below are two tables displaying details about this particular solar eclipse. The first table outlines times at which the Moon's penumbra or umbra attains the specific parameter, and the second table describes various other parameters pertaining to this eclipse.

August 21, 2036 Solar Eclipse Times
Event	Time (UTC)
First Penumbral External Contact	2036 August 21 at 15:34:28.4 UTC
Equatorial Conjunction	2036 August 21 at 16:56:07.1 UTC
Greatest Eclipse	2036 August 21 at 17:25:45.4 UTC
Ecliptic Conjunction	2036 August 21 at 17:36:33.2 UTC
Last Penumbral External Contact	2036 August 21 at 19:17:17.5 UTC

August 21, 2036 Solar Eclipse Parameters
Parameter	Value
Eclipse Magnitude	0.86225
Eclipse Obscuration	0.83814
Gamma	1.08247
Sun Right Ascension	10h05m24.9s
Sun Declination	+11°44'16.4"
Sun Semi-Diameter	15'48.7"
Sun Equatorial Horizontal Parallax	08.7"
Moon Right Ascension	10h06m34.6s
Moon Declination	+12°48'10.2"
Moon Semi-Diameter	16'41.1"
Moon Equatorial Horizontal Parallax	1°01'14.1"
ΔT	76.9 s

== Eclipse season ==
This eclipse is part of an eclipse season, a period, roughly every six months, when eclipses occur. Only two (or occasionally three) eclipse seasons occur each year, and each season lasts about 35 days and repeats just short of six months (173 days) later; thus two full eclipse seasons always occur each year. Either two or three eclipses happen each eclipse season. In the sequence below, each eclipse is separated by a fortnight. The first and last eclipse in this sequence is separated by one synodic month.

Eclipse season of July–August 2036
July 23 Ascending node (new moon)	August 7 Descending node (full moon)	August 21 Ascending node (new moon)
Partial solar eclipse Solar Saros 117	Total lunar eclipse Lunar Saros 129	Partial solar eclipse Solar Saros 155

== Related eclipses ==
=== Eclipses in 2036 ===
- A total lunar eclipse on February 11.
- A partial solar eclipse on February 27.
- A partial solar eclipse on July 23.
- A total lunar eclipse on August 7.
- A partial solar eclipse on August 21.

=== Metonic ===
- Preceded by: Solar eclipse of November 3, 2032

=== Tzolkinex ===
- Preceded by: Solar eclipse of July 11, 2029
- Followed by: Solar eclipse of October 3, 2043

=== Half-Saros ===
- Preceded by: Lunar eclipse of August 17, 2027
- Followed by: Lunar eclipse of August 27, 2045

=== Tritos ===
- Preceded by: Solar eclipse of September 21, 2025
- Followed by: Solar eclipse of July 22, 2047

=== Solar Saros 155 ===
- Preceded by: Solar eclipse of August 11, 2018
- Followed by: Solar eclipse of September 2, 2054

=== Inex ===
- Preceded by: Solar eclipse of September 11, 2007
- Followed by: Solar eclipse of August 2, 2065

=== Triad ===
- Preceded by: Solar eclipse of October 21, 1949
- Followed by: Solar eclipse of June 23, 2123

=== Solar eclipses of 2033–2036 ===
This eclipse is a member of a semester series. An eclipse in a semester series of solar eclipses repeats approximately every 177 days and 4 hours (a semester) at alternating nodes of the Moon's orbit.

The partial solar eclipse on July 23, 2036 occurs in the next lunar year eclipse set.

Solar eclipse series sets from 2033 to 2036
Descending node			Ascending node		
Saros	Map	Gamma	Saros	Map	Gamma
120	March 30, 2033 Total	0.9778	125	September 23, 2033 Partial	−1.1583
130	March 20, 2034 Total	0.2894	135	September 12, 2034 Annular	−0.3936
140	March 9, 2035 Annular	−0.4368	145	September 2, 2035 Total	0.3727
150	February 27, 2036 Partial	−1.1942	155	August 21, 2036 Partial	1.0825

=== Saros 155 ===
This eclipse is a part of Saros series 155, repeating every 18 years, 11 days, and containing 71 events. The series started with a partial solar eclipse on June 17, 1928. It contains total eclipses from September 12, 2072 through August 30, 2649; hybrid eclipses from September 10, 2667 through October 2, 2703; and annular eclipses from October 13, 2721 through May 8, 3064. The series ends at member 71 as a partial eclipse on July 24, 3190. Its eclipses are tabulated in three columns; every third eclipse in the same column is one exeligmos apart, so they all cast shadows over approximately the same parts of the Earth.

The longest duration of totality will be produced by member 14 at 4 minutes, 5 seconds on November 6, 2162, and the longest duration of annularity will be produced by member 63 at 5 minutes, 31 seconds on April 28, 3046. All eclipses in this series occur at the Moon’s ascending node of orbit.

Series members 1–16 occur between 1928 and 2200:
1	2	3
June 17, 1928	June 29, 1946	July 9, 1964
4	5	6
July 20, 1982	July 31, 2000	August 11, 2018
7	8	9
August 21, 2036	September 1–2, 2054	September 12, 2072
10	11	12
September 23, 2090	October 4–5, 2108	October 16, 2126
13	14	15
October 26, 2144	November 6–7, 2162	November 17, 2180
16
November 28, 2198

=== Metonic series ===
The metonic series repeats eclipses every 19 years (6939.69 days), lasting about 5 cycles. Eclipses occur in nearly the same calendar date. In addition, the octon subseries repeats 1/5 of that or every 3.8 years (1387.94 days). All eclipses in this table occur at the Moon's ascending node.

20 eclipse events between June 10, 1964 and August 21, 2036
June 10–11	March 28–29	January 14–16	November 3	August 21–22
117	119	121	123	125
June 10, 1964	March 28, 1968	January 16, 1972	November 3, 1975	August 22, 1979
127	129	131	133	135
June 11, 1983	March 29, 1987	January 15, 1991	November 3, 1994	August 22, 1998
137	139	141	143	145
June 10, 2002	March 29, 2006	January 15, 2010	November 3, 2013	August 21, 2017
147	149	151	153	155
June 10, 2021	March 29, 2025	January 14, 2029	November 3, 2032	August 21, 2036

=== Tritos series ===
This eclipse is a part of a tritos cycle, repeating at alternating nodes every 135 synodic months (≈ 3986.63 days, or 11 years minus 1 month). Their appearance and longitude are irregular due to a lack of synchronization with the anomalistic month (period of perigee), but groupings of 3 tritos cycles (≈ 33 years minus 3 months) come close (≈ 434.044 anomalistic months), so eclipses are similar in these groupings.

The partial solar eclipses on November 16, 2134 (part of Saros 164) and October 16, 2145 (part of Saros 165) are also a part of this series but are not included in the table below.

Series members between 1801 and 2069
June 6, 1807 (Saros 134)	May 5, 1818 (Saros 135)	April 3, 1829 (Saros 136)	March 4, 1840 (Saros 137)	February 1, 1851 (Saros 138)
December 31, 1861 (Saros 139)	November 30, 1872 (Saros 140)	October 30, 1883 (Saros 141)	September 29, 1894 (Saros 142)	August 30, 1905 (Saros 143)
July 30, 1916 (Saros 144)	June 29, 1927 (Saros 145)	May 29, 1938 (Saros 146)	April 28, 1949 (Saros 147)	March 27, 1960 (Saros 148)
February 25, 1971 (Saros 149)	January 25, 1982 (Saros 150)	December 24, 1992 (Saros 151)	November 23, 2003 (Saros 152)	October 23, 2014 (Saros 153)
September 21, 2025 (Saros 154)	August 21, 2036 (Saros 155)	July 22, 2047 (Saros 156)	June 21, 2058 (Saros 157)	May 20, 2069 (Saros 158)

=== Inex series ===
This eclipse is a part of the long period inex cycle, repeating at alternating nodes, every 358 synodic months (≈ 10,571.95 days, or 29 years minus 20 days). Their appearance and longitude are irregular due to a lack of synchronization with the anomalistic month (period of perigee). However, groupings of 3 inex cycles (≈ 87 years minus 2 months) comes close (≈ 1,151.02 anomalistic months), so eclipses are similar in these groupings.

Series members between 1801 and 2200
January 30, 1805 (Saros 147)	January 9, 1834 (Saros 148)	December 21, 1862 (Saros 149)
December 1, 1891 (Saros 150)	November 10, 1920 (Saros 151)	October 21, 1949 (Saros 152)
October 2, 1978 (Saros 153)	September 11, 2007 (Saros 154)	August 21, 2036 (Saros 155)
August 2, 2065 (Saros 156)	July 12, 2094 (Saros 157)	June 23, 2123 (Saros 158)
June 3, 2152 (Saros 159)	May 13, 2181 (Saros 160)	
