= Solar eclipse of November 14, 2050 =

Future partial solar eclipse

- Partial eclipse
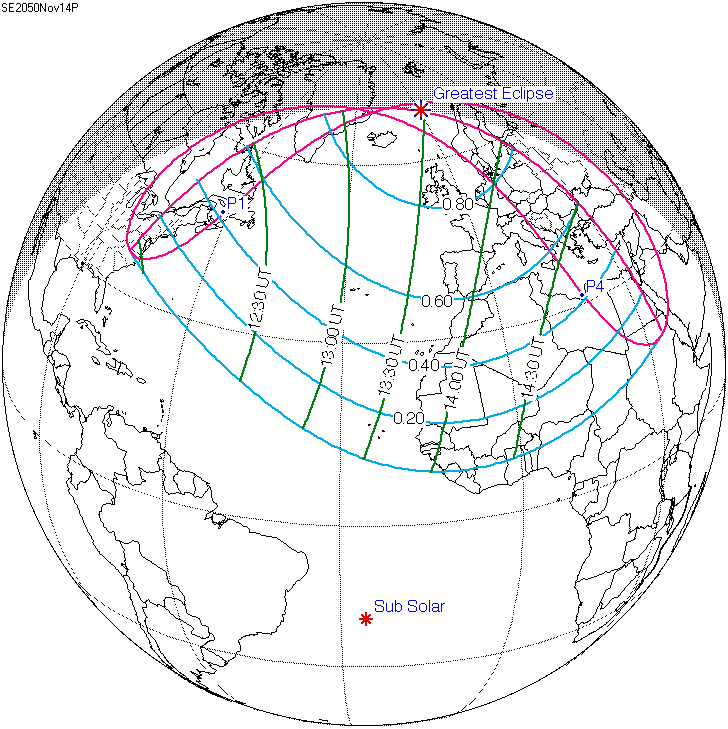
- Map
- Gamma: 1.0447
- Magnitude: 0.8874

Maximum eclipse
- Coordinates: 69.5°N 1°E

Times (UTC)
- Greatest eclipse: 13:30:53

References
- Saros: 153 (11 of 70)
- Catalog # (SE5000): 9620

A partial solar eclipse will occur at the Moon's ascending node of orbit on Monday, November 14, 2050, with a magnitude of 0.8874. A solar eclipse occurs when the Moon passes between Earth and the Sun, thereby totally or partly obscuring the image of the Sun for a viewer on Earth. A partial solar eclipse occurs in the polar regions of the Earth when the center of the Moon's shadow misses the Earth.

The partial solar eclipse will be visible for parts of the Northeastern United States, eastern Canada, Greenland, Europe, West Africa, and North Africa.

== Eclipse timing ==
=== Places experiencing partial eclipse ===
Solar Eclipse of November 14, 2050 (Local Times)
Country or territory	City or place	Start of partial eclipse	Maximum eclipse	End of partial eclipse	Duration of eclipse (hr:min)	Maximum coverage
Greenland	Nuuk	09:53:26 (sunrise)	10:43:25	12:00:07	2:07	64.70%
Greenland	Ittoqqortoormiit	09:54:36	11:11:17	12:28:14	2:34	80.64%
Iceland	Reykjavík	11:50:32	13:11:36	14:33:07	2:43	79.11%
Faroe Islands	Tórshavn	12:06:04	13:29:33	14:50:37	2:45	81.49%
Ireland	Dublin	12:08:27	13:38:06	15:03:34	2:55	75.42%
Isle of Man	Douglas	12:11:01	13:39:55	15:04:21	2:53	76.31%
Finland	Helsinki	14:44:10	15:46:16	15:51:46 (sunset)	1:08	64.40%
Portugal	Lisbon	12:11:15	13:47:37	15:17:26	3:06	54.71%
United Kingdom	London	12:19:36	13:49:14	15:12:43	2:53	73.53%
Norway	Oslo	13:28:38	14:50:26	15:50:02 (sunset)	2:21	79.39%
Estonia	Tallinn	14:45:06	15:50:38	15:56:55 (sunset)	1:12	67.63%
Netherlands	Amsterdam	13:27:22	14:54:56	16:15:46	2:48	73.81%
France	Paris	13:26:08	14:56:14	16:18:57	2:53	70.00%
Belgium	Brussels	13:27:52	14:56:20	16:17:42	2:50	72.14%
Spain	Madrid	13:21:45	14:56:40	16:23:16	3:02	57.86%
Sweden	Stockholm	13:38:01	14:57:38	15:24:12 (sunset)	1:46	76.99%
Denmark	Copenhagen	13:35:36	14:58:44	16:04:47 (sunset)	2:29	75.38%
Luxembourg	Luxembourg	13:32:12	15:00:26	16:20:57	2:49	70.19%
Germany	Berlin	13:40:40	15:04:31	16:14:37 (sunset)	2:34	71.60%
Latvia	Riga	14:48:19	16:06:05	16:12:44 (sunset)	1:24	72.39%
Switzerland	Zurich	13:39:10	15:06:49	16:25:55	2:47	66.35%
Russia	Kaliningrad	14:47:31	16:07:21	16:37:20 (sunset)	1:50	71.39%
Belarus	Minsk	15:57:17	17:08:16	17:12:33 (sunset)	1:15	65.70%
Czech Republic	Prague	13:45:35	15:09:25	16:19:06 (sunset)	2:34	68.01%
Lithuania	Vilnius	14:53:22	16:10:49	16:18:22 (sunset)	1:25	69.14%
Poland	Warsaw	13:52:01	15:11:55	15:45:12 (sunset)	1:53	67.99%
Austria	Vienna	13:51:31	15:14:22	16:17:20 (sunset)	2:26	64.37%
Croatia	Zagreb	13:54:40	15:17:42	16:25:56 (sunset)	2:31	60.70%
Hungary	Budapest	13:56:56	15:18:01	16:08:47 (sunset)	2:12	61.87%
Italy	Rome	13:54:40	15:19:43	16:35:02	2:40	55.59%

== Eclipse details ==
Shown below are two tables displaying details about this particular solar eclipse. The first table outlines times at which the Moon's penumbra or umbra attains the specific parameter, and the second table describes various other parameters pertaining to this eclipse.

November 14, 2050 Solar Eclipse Times
Event	Time (UTC)
First Penumbral External Contact	2050 November 14 at 11:17:27.7 UTC
Equatorial Conjunction	2050 November 14 at 13:11:24.1 UTC
Greatest Eclipse	2050 November 14 at 13:30:52.8 UTC
Ecliptic Conjunction	2050 November 14 at 13:42:38.5 UTC
Last Penumbral External Contact	2050 November 14 at 15:44:21.5 UTC

November 14, 2050 Solar Eclipse Parameters
Parameter	Value
Eclipse Magnitude	0.88738
Eclipse Obscuration	0.83218
Gamma	1.04468
Sun Right Ascension	15h19m50.5s
Sun Declination	-18°21'19.2"
Sun Semi-Diameter	16'09.8"
Sun Equatorial Horizontal Parallax	08.9"
Moon Right Ascension	15h20m29.5s
Moon Declination	-17°24'01.9"
Moon Semi-Diameter	15'10.6"
Moon Equatorial Horizontal Parallax	0°55'41.9"
ΔT	84.6 s

== Eclipse season ==
This eclipse is part of an eclipse season, a period, roughly every six months, when eclipses occur. Only two (or occasionally three) eclipse seasons occur each year, and each season lasts about 35 days and repeats just short of six months (173 days) later; thus two full eclipse seasons always occur each year. Either two or three eclipses happen each eclipse season. In the sequence below, each eclipse is separated by a fortnight.

Eclipse season of October–November 2050
October 30 Descending node (full moon)	November 14 Ascending node (new moon)
Total lunar eclipse Lunar Saros 127	Partial solar eclipse Solar Saros 153

== Related eclipses ==
=== Eclipses in 2050 ===
- A total lunar eclipse on May 6.
- A hybrid solar eclipse on May 20.
- A total lunar eclipse on October 30.
- A partial solar eclipse on November 14.

=== Metonic ===
- Preceded by: Solar eclipse of January 26, 2047
- Followed by: Solar eclipse of September 2, 2054

=== Tzolkinex ===
- Preceded by: Solar eclipse of October 3, 2043
- Followed by: Solar eclipse of December 26, 2057

=== Half-Saros ===
- Preceded by: Lunar eclipse of November 8, 2041
- Followed by: Lunar eclipse of November 19, 2059

=== Tritos ===
- Preceded by: Solar eclipse of December 15, 2039
- Followed by: Solar eclipse of October 13, 2061

=== Solar Saros 153 ===
- Preceded by: Solar eclipse of November 3, 2032
- Followed by: Solar eclipse of November 24, 2068

=== Inex ===
- Preceded by: Solar eclipse of December 4, 2021
- Followed by: Solar eclipse of October 24, 2079

=== Triad ===
- Preceded by: Solar eclipse of January 14, 1964
- Followed by: Solar eclipse of September 15, 2137

=== Solar eclipses of 2047–2050 ===
This eclipse is a member of a semester series. An eclipse in a semester series of solar eclipses repeats approximately every 177 days and 4 hours (a semester) at alternating nodes of the Moon's orbit.

The partial solar eclipses on January 26, 2047 and July 22, 2047 occur in the previous lunar year eclipse set.

Solar eclipse series sets from 2047 to 2050
Descending node			Ascending node		
Saros	Map	Gamma	Saros	Map	Gamma
118	June 23, 2047 Partial	1.3766	123	December 16, 2047 Partial	−1.0661
128	June 11, 2048 Annular	0.6468	133	December 5, 2048 Total	−0.3973
138	May 31, 2049 Annular	−0.1187	143	November 25, 2049 Hybrid	0.2943
148	May 20, 2050 Hybrid	−0.8688	153	November 14, 2050 Partial	1.0447

=== Saros 153 ===
This eclipse is a part of Saros series 153, repeating every 18 years, 11 days, and containing 70 events. The series started with a partial solar eclipse on July 28, 1870. It contains annular eclipses from December 17, 2104 through May 26, 2970. There are no hybrid or total eclipses in this set. The series ends at member 70 as a partial eclipse on August 22, 3114. Its eclipses are tabulated in three columns; every third eclipse in the same column is one exeligmos apart, so they all cast shadows over approximately the same parts of the Earth.

The longest duration of annularity will be produced by member 38 at 7 minutes, 1 seconds on September 5, 2537. All eclipses in this series occur at the Moon’s ascending node of orbit.

Series members 1–19 occur between 1870 and 2200:
1	2	3
July 28, 1870	August 7, 1888	August 20, 1906
4	5	6
August 30, 1924	September 10, 1942	September 20, 1960
7	8	9
October 2, 1978	October 12, 1996	October 23, 2014
10	11	12
November 3, 2032	November 14, 2050	November 24, 2068
13	14	15
December 6, 2086	December 17, 2104	December 28, 2122
16	17	18
January 8, 2141	January 19, 2159	January 29, 2177
19
February 10, 2195

=== Metonic series ===
The metonic series repeats eclipses every 19 years (6939.69 days), lasting about 5 cycles. Eclipses occur in nearly the same calendar date. In addition, the octon subseries repeats 1/5 of that or every 3.8 years (1387.94 days). All eclipses in this table occur at the Moon's ascending node.

21 eclipse events between June 21, 1982 and June 21, 2058
June 21	April 8–9	January 26	November 13–14	September 1–2
117	119	121	123	125
June 21, 1982	April 9, 1986	January 26, 1990	November 13, 1993	September 2, 1997
127	129	131	133	135
June 21, 2001	April 8, 2005	January 26, 2009	November 13, 2012	September 1, 2016
137	139	141	143	145
June 21, 2020	April 8, 2024	January 26, 2028	November 14, 2031	September 2, 2035
147	149	151	153	155
June 21, 2039	April 9, 2043	January 26, 2047	November 14, 2050	September 2, 2054
157
June 21, 2058

=== Tritos series ===
This eclipse is a part of a tritos cycle, repeating at alternating nodes every 135 synodic months (≈ 3986.63 days, or 11 years minus 1 month). Their appearance and longitude are irregular due to a lack of synchronization with the anomalistic month (period of perigee), but groupings of 3 tritos cycles (≈ 33 years minus 3 months) come close (≈ 434.044 anomalistic months), so eclipses are similar in these groupings.

The partial solar eclipses on December 7, 2170 (part of Saros 164) and November 7, 2181 (part of Saros 165) are also a part of this series but are not included in the table below.

Series members between 1801 and 2105
September 28, 1810 (Saros 131)	August 27, 1821 (Saros 132)	July 27, 1832 (Saros 133)	June 27, 1843 (Saros 134)	May 26, 1854 (Saros 135)
April 25, 1865 (Saros 136)	March 25, 1876 (Saros 137)	February 22, 1887 (Saros 138)	January 22, 1898 (Saros 139)	December 23, 1908 (Saros 140)
November 22, 1919 (Saros 141)	October 21, 1930 (Saros 142)	September 21, 1941 (Saros 143)	August 20, 1952 (Saros 144)	July 20, 1963 (Saros 145)
June 20, 1974 (Saros 146)	May 19, 1985 (Saros 147)	April 17, 1996 (Saros 148)	March 19, 2007 (Saros 149)	February 15, 2018 (Saros 150)
January 14, 2029 (Saros 151)	December 15, 2039 (Saros 152)	November 14, 2050 (Saros 153)	October 13, 2061 (Saros 154)	September 12, 2072 (Saros 155)
August 13, 2083 (Saros 156)	July 12, 2094 (Saros 157)	June 12, 2105 (Saros 158)		

=== Inex series ===
This eclipse is a part of the long period inex cycle, repeating at alternating nodes, every 358 synodic months (≈ 10,571.95 days, or 29 years minus 20 days). Their appearance and longitude are irregular due to a lack of synchronization with the anomalistic month (period of perigee). However, groupings of 3 inex cycles (≈ 87 years minus 2 months) comes close (≈ 1,151.02 anomalistic months), so eclipses are similar in these groupings.

Series members between 1801 and 2200
April 24, 1819 (Saros 145)	April 3, 1848 (Saros 146)	March 15, 1877 (Saros 147)
February 23, 1906 (Saros 148)	February 3, 1935 (Saros 149)	January 14, 1964 (Saros 150)
December 24, 1992 (Saros 151)	December 4, 2021 (Saros 152)	November 14, 2050 (Saros 153)
October 24, 2079 (Saros 154)	October 5, 2108 (Saros 155)	September 15, 2137 (Saros 156)
August 25, 2166 (Saros 157)	August 5, 2195 (Saros 158)	
