= Solar eclipse of January 26, 1990 =

20th-century annular solar eclipse

- Annular eclipse
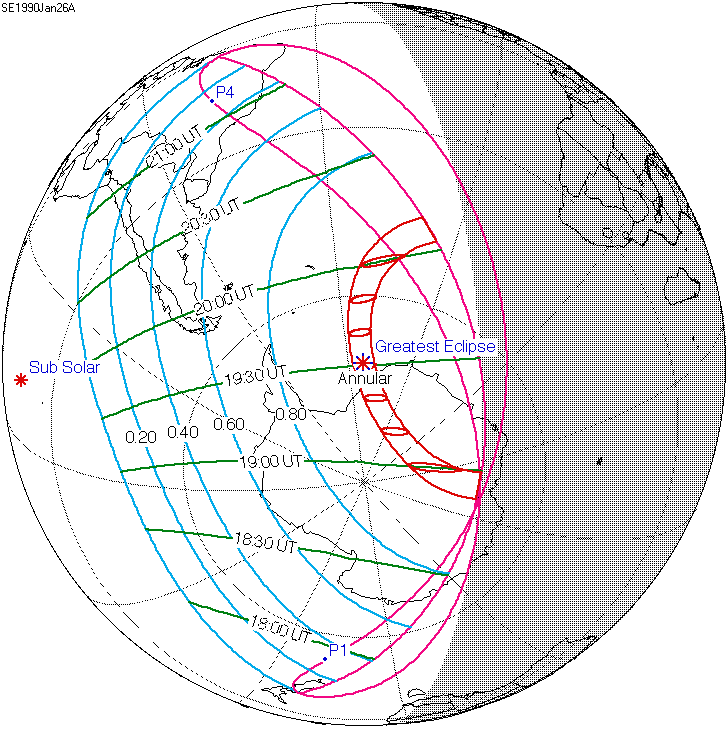
- Map
- Gamma: −0.9457
- Magnitude: 0.967

Maximum eclipse
- Duration: 123 s (2 min 3 s)
- Coordinates: 71°S 22.2°W
- Max. width of band: 373 km (232 mi)

Times (UTC)
- Greatest eclipse: 19:31:24

References
- Saros: 121 (59 of 71)
- Catalog # (SE5000): 9486

An annular solar eclipse occurred at the Moon's ascending node of orbit on Friday, January 26, 1990, with a magnitude of 0.967. A solar eclipse occurs when the Moon passes between Earth and the Sun, thereby totally or partly obscuring the image of the Sun for a viewer on Earth. An annular solar eclipse occurs when the Moon's apparent diameter is smaller than the Sun's, blocking most of the Sun's light and causing the Sun to look like an annulus (ring). An annular eclipse appears as a partial eclipse over a region of the Earth thousands of kilometres wide. Occurring 7.1 days after apogee (on January 19, 1990, at 16:00 UTC), the Moon's apparent diameter was smaller.

Annularity was visible from a part of Antarctica. A partial eclipse was visible for parts of Antarctica, southern and eastern South America, and New Zealand.

== Eclipse timing ==
=== Places experiencing partial eclipse ===
Solar Eclipse of January 26, 1990 (Local Times)
Country or territory	City or place	Start of partial eclipse	Maximum eclipse	End of partial eclipse	Duration of eclipse (hr:min)	Maximum coverage
New Zealand	Dunedin (Note: The times listed for this location occur on January 27, 1990, local time.)	06:23:41 (sunrise)	06:45:43	07:14:55	0:51	5.16%
New Zealand	Oban	06:29:57 (sunrise)	06:47:26	07:20:27	0:51	7.86%
Australia	Macquarie Island	04:36:56 (sunrise)	04:58:54	05:45:24	1:08	27.00%
Antarctica	Belgrano II Base	16:13:25	17:16:56	18:18:52	2:05	89.90%
Antarctica	Troll	18:26:10	19:24:56	20:22:03	1:56	89.68%
Antarctica	Neumayer Station III	18:29:31	19:29:30	20:27:29	1:58	91.41%
Antarctica	Orcadas Base	16:43:26	17:49:39	18:51:59	2:09	82.19%
Bouvet Island	Bouvet Island	19:56:29	20:51:20	20:58:28 (sunset)	1:02	88.48%
Chile	Punta Arenas	15:45:21	16:54:43	17:59:13	2:14	48.92%
Saint Helena, Ascension and Tristan da Cunha	Edinburgh of the Seven Seas	19:29:39	20:02:26	20:05:24 (sunset)	0:36	46.52%
South Georgia and the South Sandwich Islands	King Edward Point	16:59:20	18:03:07	19:02:45	2:03	84.59%
Falkland Islands	Stanley	15:56:35	17:04:38	18:07:36	2:11	62.06%
Argentina	Mar del Plata	17:29:44	18:32:32	19:29:52	2:00	44.51%
Chile	Santiago	16:40:59	17:36:54	18:28:10	1:47	20.92%
Uruguay	Montevideo	17:37:56	18:38:42	19:34:13	1:56	41.43%
Argentina	Buenos Aires	17:38:24	18:38:53	19:34:06	1:56	38.30%
Argentina	Mendoza	17:42:40	18:38:54	19:30:23	1:48	22.42%
Argentina	Rosario	17:42:38	18:41:31	19:35:18	1:53	32.89%
Argentina	Córdoba	17:47:01	18:43:33	19:35:14	1:48	26.07%
Brazil	Recife	18:36:11	18:44:23	18:46:41 (sunset)	0:11	2.72%
Brazil	Porto Alegre	17:50:23	18:47:40	19:40:09	1:50	39.21%
Brazil	Fortaleza	18:54:13	18:54:45	18:55:15 (sunset)	0:01	0.02%
Paraguay	Asunción	17:03:52	17:55:38	18:43:14	1:39	23.95%
Brazil	Rio de Janeiro	18:05:36	18:57:09	19:42:02 (sunset)	1:36	34.43%
Brazil	São Paulo	18:05:19	18:57:13	19:45:09	1:40	32.34%
Brazil	Salvador	18:26:31	18:59:18	19:07:58 (sunset)	0:41	17.04%
Bolivia	Sucre	16:29:12	17:05:17	17:39:11	1:10	6.56%
Bolivia	Cochabamba	16:37:22	17:07:47	17:36:38	0:59	3.86%
Brazil	Brasília	18:25:37	19:08:03	19:47:42	1:24	16.75%
Bolivia	La Paz	16:45:42	17:08:56	17:31:14	0:46	1.64%

== Eclipse details ==
Shown below are two tables displaying details about this particular solar eclipse. The first table outlines times at which the Moon's penumbra or umbra attains the specific parameter, and the second table describes various other parameters pertaining to this eclipse.

January 26, 1990 Solar Eclipse Times
Event	Time (UTC)
First Penumbral External Contact	1990 January 26 at 17:14:16.9 UTC
First Umbral External Contact	1990 January 26 at 18:52:41.6 UTC
Equatorial Conjunction	1990 January 26 at 18:52:52.1 UTC
First Central Line	1990 January 26 at 18:56:20.7 UTC
Greatest Duration	1990 January 26 at 18:56:20.7 UTC
First Umbral Internal Contact	1990 January 26 at 19:00:22.0 UTC
Ecliptic Conjunction	1990 January 26 at 19:20:58.8 UTC
Greatest Eclipse	1990 January 26 at 19:31:23.9 UTC
Last Umbral Internal Contact	1990 January 26 at 20:02:53.7 UTC
Last Central Line	1990 January 26 at 20:06:51.8 UTC
Last Umbral External Contact	1990 January 26 at 20:10:27.5 UTC
Last Penumbral External Contact	1990 January 26 at 21:48:40.7 UTC

January 26, 1990 Solar Eclipse Parameters
Parameter	Value
Eclipse Magnitude	0.96698
Eclipse Obscuration	0.93506
Gamma	−0.94571
Sun Right Ascension	20h35m55.4s
Sun Declination	-18°37'40.0"
Sun Semi-Diameter	16'14.5"
Sun Equatorial Horizontal Parallax	08.9"
Moon Right Ascension	20h37m14.5s
Moon Declination	-19°28'27.1"
Moon Semi-Diameter	15'38.0"
Moon Equatorial Horizontal Parallax	0°57'22.4"
ΔT	56.9 s

== Eclipse season ==
This eclipse is part of an eclipse season, a period, roughly every six months, when eclipses occur. Only two (or occasionally three) eclipse seasons occur each year, and each season lasts about 35 days and repeats just short of six months (173 days) later; thus two full eclipse seasons always occur each year. Either two or three eclipses happen each eclipse season. In the sequence below, each eclipse is separated by a fortnight.

Eclipse season of January–February 1990
January 26 Ascending node (new moon)	February 9 Descending node (full moon)
Annular solar eclipse Solar Saros 121	Total lunar eclipse Lunar Saros 133

== Related eclipses ==
=== Eclipses in 1990 ===
- An annular solar eclipse on January 26.
- A total lunar eclipse on February 9.
- A total solar eclipse on July 22.
- A partial lunar eclipse on August 6.

=== Metonic ===
- Preceded by: Solar eclipse of April 9, 1986
- Followed by: Solar eclipse of November 13, 1993

=== Tzolkinex ===
- Preceded by: Solar eclipse of December 15, 1982
- Followed by: Solar eclipse of March 9, 1997

=== Half-Saros ===
- Preceded by: Lunar eclipse of January 20, 1981
- Followed by: Lunar eclipse of January 31, 1999

=== Tritos ===
- Preceded by: Solar eclipse of February 26, 1979
- Followed by: Solar eclipse of December 25, 2000

=== Solar Saros 121 ===
- Preceded by: Solar eclipse of January 16, 1972
- Followed by: Solar eclipse of February 7, 2008

=== Inex ===
- Preceded by: Solar eclipse of February 15, 1961
- Followed by: Solar eclipse of January 6, 2019

=== Triad ===
- Preceded by: Solar eclipse of March 29, 1903
- Followed by: Solar eclipse of November 26, 2076

=== Solar eclipses of 1990–1992 ===
This eclipse is a member of a semester series. An eclipse in a semester series of solar eclipses repeats approximately every 177 days and 4 hours (a semester) at alternating nodes of the Moon's orbit.

Solar eclipse series sets from 1990 to 1992
Ascending node			Descending node		
Saros	Map	Gamma	Saros	Map	Gamma
121	January 26, 1990 Annular	−0.9457	126 Partial in Finland	July 22, 1990 Total	0.7597
131	January 15, 1991 Annular	−0.2727	136 Totality in Playas del Coco, Costa Rica	July 11, 1991 Total	−0.0041
141	January 4, 1992 Annular	0.4091	146	June 30, 1992 Total	−0.7512
151	December 24, 1992 Partial	1.0711			

=== Saros 121 ===
This eclipse is a part of Saros series 121, repeating every 18 years, 11 days, and containing 71 events. The series started with a partial solar eclipse on April 25, 944 AD. It contains total eclipses from July 10, 1070 through October 9, 1809; hybrid eclipses on October 20, 1827 and October 30, 1845; and annular eclipses from November 11, 1863 through February 28, 2044. The series ends at member 71 as a partial eclipse on June 7, 2206. Its eclipses are tabulated in three columns; every third eclipse in the same column is one exeligmos apart, so they all cast shadows over approximately the same parts of the Earth.

The longest duration of totality was produced by member 39 at 6 minutes, 20 seconds on June 21, 1629, and the longest duration of annularity will be produced by member 62 at 2 minutes, 27 seconds on February 28, 2044. All eclipses in this series occur at the Moon’s ascending node of orbit.

Series members 49–70 occur between 1801 and 2200:
49	50	51
October 9, 1809	October 20, 1827	October 30, 1845
52	53	54
November 11, 1863	November 21, 1881	December 3, 1899
55	56	57
December 14, 1917	December 25, 1935	January 5, 1954
58	59	60
January 16, 1972	January 26, 1990	February 7, 2008
61	62	63
February 17, 2026	February 28, 2044	March 11, 2062
64	65	66
March 21, 2080	April 1, 2098	April 13, 2116
67	68	69
April 24, 2134	May 4, 2152	May 16, 2170
70
May 26, 2188

=== Metonic series ===
The metonic series repeats eclipses every 19 years (6939.69 days), lasting about 5 cycles. Eclipses occur in nearly the same calendar date. In addition, the octon subseries repeats 1/5 of that or every 3.8 years (1387.94 days). All eclipses in this table occur at the Moon's ascending node.

21 eclipse events between June 21, 1982 and June 21, 2058
June 21	April 8–9	January 26	November 13–14	September 1–2
117	119	121	123	125
June 21, 1982	April 9, 1986	January 26, 1990	November 13, 1993	September 2, 1997
127	129	131	133	135
June 21, 2001	April 8, 2005	January 26, 2009	November 13, 2012	September 1, 2016
137	139	141	143	145
June 21, 2020	April 8, 2024	January 26, 2028	November 14, 2031	September 2, 2035
147	149	151	153	155
June 21, 2039	April 9, 2043	January 26, 2047	November 14, 2050	September 2, 2054
157
June 21, 2058

=== Tritos series ===
This eclipse is a part of a tritos cycle, repeating at alternating nodes every 135 synodic months (≈ 3986.63 days, or 11 years minus 1 month). Their appearance and longitude are irregular due to a lack of synchronization with the anomalistic month (period of perigee), but groupings of 3 tritos cycles (≈ 33 years minus 3 months) come close (≈ 434.044 anomalistic months), so eclipses are similar in these groupings.

Series members between 1837 and 2200
April 5, 1837 (Saros 107)	March 5, 1848 (Saros 108)	February 3, 1859 (Saros 109)		December 2, 1880 (Saros 111)
		August 31, 1913 (Saros 114)	July 31, 1924 (Saros 115)	June 30, 1935 (Saros 116)
May 30, 1946 (Saros 117)	April 30, 1957 (Saros 118)	March 28, 1968 (Saros 119)	February 26, 1979 (Saros 120)	January 26, 1990 (Saros 121)
December 25, 2000 (Saros 122)	November 25, 2011 (Saros 123)	October 25, 2022 (Saros 124)	September 23, 2033 (Saros 125)	August 23, 2044 (Saros 126)
July 24, 2055 (Saros 127)	June 22, 2066 (Saros 128)	May 22, 2077 (Saros 129)	April 21, 2088 (Saros 130)	March 21, 2099 (Saros 131)
February 18, 2110 (Saros 132)	January 19, 2121 (Saros 133)	December 19, 2131 (Saros 134)	November 17, 2142 (Saros 135)	October 17, 2153 (Saros 136)
September 16, 2164 (Saros 137)	August 16, 2175 (Saros 138)	July 16, 2186 (Saros 139)	June 15, 2197 (Saros 140)	

=== Inex series ===
This eclipse is a part of the long period inex cycle, repeating at alternating nodes, every 358 synodic months (≈ 10,571.95 days, or 29 years minus 20 days). Their appearance and longitude are irregular due to a lack of synchronization with the anomalistic month (period of perigee). However, groupings of 3 inex cycles (≈ 87 years minus 2 months) comes close (≈ 1,151.02 anomalistic months), so eclipses are similar in these groupings.

Series members between 1801 and 2200
May 27, 1816 (Saros 115)	May 6, 1845 (Saros 116)	April 16, 1874 (Saros 117)
March 29, 1903 (Saros 118)	March 7, 1932 (Saros 119)	February 15, 1961 (Saros 120)
January 26, 1990 (Saros 121)	January 6, 2019 (Saros 122)	December 16, 2047 (Saros 123)
November 26, 2076 (Saros 124)	November 6, 2105 (Saros 125)	October 17, 2134 (Saros 126)
September 28, 2163 (Saros 127)	September 6, 2192 (Saros 128)	
