= Solar eclipse of September 2, 2054 =

Future partial solar eclipse

- Partial eclipse
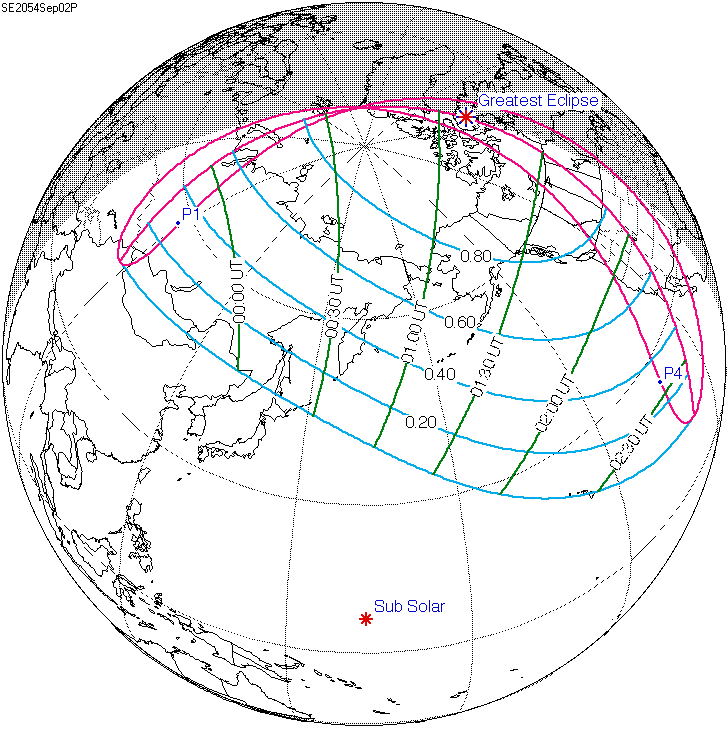
- Map
- Gamma: 1.0215
- Magnitude: 0.9793

Maximum eclipse
- Coordinates: 71.7°N 82.3°W

Times (UTC)
- Greatest eclipse: 1:09:34

References
- Saros: 155 (8 of 71)
- Catalog # (SE5000): 9628

A partial solar eclipse will occur at the Moon's ascending node of orbit between Tuesday, September 1 and Wednesday, September 2, 2054, with a magnitude of 0.9793. A solar eclipse occurs when the Moon passes between Earth and the Sun, thereby totally or partly obscuring the image of the Sun for a viewer on Earth. A partial solar eclipse occurs in the polar regions of the Earth when the center of the Moon's shadow misses the Earth.

The partial solar eclipse will be visible for parts of Northeast Asia, Alaska, western Canada, and the western United States. This is the last of the first set of partial eclipses in Solar Saros 155.

== Eclipse details ==
Shown below are two tables displaying details about this particular solar eclipse. The first table outlines times at which the Moon's penumbra or umbra attains the specific parameter, and the second table describes various other parameters pertaining to this eclipse.

September 2, 2054 Solar Eclipse Times
Event	Time (UTC)
First Penumbral External Contact	2054 September 01 at 23:12:21.2 UTC
Equatorial Conjunction	2054 September 02 at 00:38:15.2 UTC
Greatest Eclipse	2054 September 02 at 01:09:33.7 UTC
Ecliptic Conjunction	2054 September 02 at 01:19:46.2 UTC
Last Penumbral External Contact	2054 September 02 at 03:07:02.1 UTC

September 2, 2054 Solar Eclipse Parameters
Parameter	Value
Eclipse Magnitude	0.97932
Eclipse Obscuration	0.98275
Gamma	1.02148
Sun Right Ascension	10h45m28.2s
Sun Declination	+07°52'58.6"
Sun Semi-Diameter	15'50.9"
Sun Equatorial Horizontal Parallax	08.7"
Moon Right Ascension	10h46m40.4s
Moon Declination	+08°52'49.8"
Moon Semi-Diameter	16'42.0"
Moon Equatorial Horizontal Parallax	1°01'17.5"
ΔT	86.9 s

== Eclipse season ==
This eclipse is part of an eclipse season, a period, roughly every six months, when eclipses occur. Only two (or occasionally three) eclipse seasons occur each year, and each season lasts about 35 days and repeats just short of six months (173 days) later; thus two full eclipse seasons always occur each year. Either two or three eclipses happen each eclipse season. In the sequence below, each eclipse is separated by a fortnight. The first and last eclipse in this sequence is separated by one synodic month.

Eclipse season of August–September 2054
August 3 Ascending node (new moon)	August 18 Descending node (full moon)	September 2 Ascending node (new moon)
Partial solar eclipse Solar Saros 117	Total lunar eclipse Lunar Saros 129	Partial solar eclipse Solar Saros 155

== Related eclipses ==
=== Eclipses in 2054 ===
- A total lunar eclipse on February 22.
- A partial solar eclipse on March 9.
- A partial solar eclipse on August 3.
- A total lunar eclipse on August 18.
- A partial solar eclipse on September 2.

=== Metonic ===
- Preceded by: Solar eclipse of November 14, 2050
- Followed by: Solar eclipse of June 21, 2058

=== Tzolkinex ===
- Preceded by: Solar eclipse of July 22, 2047
- Followed by: Solar eclipse of October 13, 2061

=== Half-Saros ===
- Preceded by: Lunar eclipse of August 27, 2045
- Followed by: Lunar eclipse of September 7, 2063

=== Tritos ===
- Preceded by: Solar eclipse of October 3, 2043
- Followed by: Solar eclipse of August 2, 2065

=== Solar Saros 155 ===
- Preceded by: Solar eclipse of August 21, 2036
- Followed by: Solar eclipse of September 12, 2072

=== Inex ===
- Preceded by: Solar eclipse of September 21, 2025
- Followed by: Solar eclipse of August 13, 2083

=== Triad ===
- Preceded by: Solar eclipse of November 2, 1967
- Followed by: Solar eclipse of July 3, 2141

=== Solar eclipses of 2051–2054 ===
This eclipse is a member of a semester series. An eclipse in a semester series of solar eclipses repeats approximately every 177 days and 4 hours (a semester) at alternating nodes of the Moon's orbit.

The partial solar eclipse on August 3, 2054 occurs in the next lunar year eclipse set.

Solar eclipse series sets from 2051 to 2054
Descending node			Ascending node		
Saros	Map	Gamma	Saros	Map	Gamma
120	April 11, 2051 Partial	1.0169	125	October 4, 2051 Partial	−1.2094
130	March 30, 2052 Total	0.3238	135	September 22, 2052 Annular	−0.448
140	March 20, 2053 Annular	−0.4089	145	September 12, 2053 Total	0.314
150	March 9, 2054 Partial	−1.1711	155	September 2, 2054 Partial	1.0215

=== Saros 155 ===
This eclipse is a part of Saros series 155, repeating every 18 years, 11 days, and containing 71 events. The series started with a partial solar eclipse on June 17, 1928. It contains total eclipses from September 12, 2072 through August 30, 2649; hybrid eclipses from September 10, 2667 through October 2, 2703; and annular eclipses from October 13, 2721 through May 8, 3064. The series ends at member 71 as a partial eclipse on July 24, 3190. Its eclipses are tabulated in three columns; every third eclipse in the same column is one exeligmos apart, so they all cast shadows over approximately the same parts of the Earth.

The longest duration of totality will be produced by member 14 at 4 minutes, 5 seconds on November 6, 2162, and the longest duration of annularity will be produced by member 63 at 5 minutes, 31 seconds on April 28, 3046. All eclipses in this series occur at the Moon’s ascending node of orbit.

Series members 1–16 occur between 1928 and 2200:
1	2	3
June 17, 1928	June 29, 1946	July 9, 1964
4	5	6
July 20, 1982	July 31, 2000	August 11, 2018
7	8	9
August 21, 2036	September 2, 2054	September 12, 2072
10	11	12
September 23, 2090	October 5, 2108	October 16, 2126
13	14	15
October 26, 2144	November 7, 2162	November 17, 2180
16
November 28, 2198

=== Metonic series ===
The metonic series repeats eclipses every 19 years (6939.69 days), lasting about 5 cycles. Eclipses occur in nearly the same calendar date. In addition, the octon subseries repeats 1/5 of that or every 3.8 years (1387.94 days). All eclipses in this table occur at the Moon's ascending node.

21 eclipse events between June 21, 1982 and June 21, 2058
June 21	April 8–9	January 26	November 13–14	September 1–2
117	119	121	123	125
June 21, 1982	April 9, 1986	January 26, 1990	November 13, 1993	September 2, 1997
127	129	131	133	135
June 21, 2001	April 8, 2005	January 26, 2009	November 13, 2012	September 1, 2016
137	139	141	143	145
June 21, 2020	April 8, 2024	January 26, 2028	November 14, 2031	September 2, 2035
147	149	151	153	155
June 21, 2039	April 9, 2043	January 26, 2047	November 14, 2050	September 2, 2054
157
June 21, 2058

=== Tritos series ===
This eclipse is a part of a tritos cycle, repeating at alternating nodes every 135 synodic months (≈ 3986.63 days, or 11 years minus 1 month). Their appearance and longitude are irregular due to a lack of synchronization with the anomalistic month (period of perigee), but groupings of 3 tritos cycles (≈ 33 years minus 3 months) come close (≈ 434.044 anomalistic months), so eclipses are similar in these groupings.

Series members between 1801 and 2087
August 17, 1803 (Saros 132)	July 17, 1814 (Saros 133)	June 16, 1825 (Saros 134)	May 15, 1836 (Saros 135)	April 15, 1847 (Saros 136)
March 15, 1858 (Saros 137)	February 11, 1869 (Saros 138)	January 11, 1880 (Saros 139)	December 12, 1890 (Saros 140)	November 11, 1901 (Saros 141)
October 10, 1912 (Saros 142)	September 10, 1923 (Saros 143)	August 10, 1934 (Saros 144)	July 9, 1945 (Saros 145)	June 8, 1956 (Saros 146)
May 9, 1967 (Saros 147)	April 7, 1978 (Saros 148)	March 7, 1989 (Saros 149)	February 5, 2000 (Saros 150)	January 4, 2011 (Saros 151)
December 4, 2021 (Saros 152)	November 3, 2032 (Saros 153)	October 3, 2043 (Saros 154)	September 2, 2054 (Saros 155)	August 2, 2065 (Saros 156)
July 1, 2076 (Saros 157)	June 1, 2087 (Saros 158)			

=== Inex series ===
This eclipse is a part of the long period inex cycle, repeating at alternating nodes, every 358 synodic months (≈ 10,571.95 days, or 29 years minus 20 days). Their appearance and longitude are irregular due to a lack of synchronization with the anomalistic month (period of perigee). However, groupings of 3 inex cycles (≈ 87 years minus 2 months) comes close (≈ 1,151.02 anomalistic months), so eclipses are similar in these groupings.

Series members between 1801 and 2200
February 11, 1823 (Saros 147)	January 21, 1852 (Saros 148)	December 31, 1880 (Saros 149)
December 12, 1909 (Saros 150)	November 21, 1938 (Saros 151)	November 2, 1967 (Saros 152)
October 12, 1996 (Saros 153)	September 21, 2025 (Saros 154)	September 2, 2054 (Saros 155)
August 13, 2083 (Saros 156)	July 23, 2112 (Saros 157)	July 3, 2141 (Saros 158)
June 14, 2170 (Saros 159)	May 24, 2199 (Saros 160)	
