= Solar eclipse of June 11, 2048 =

Future annular solar eclipse

- Annular eclipse
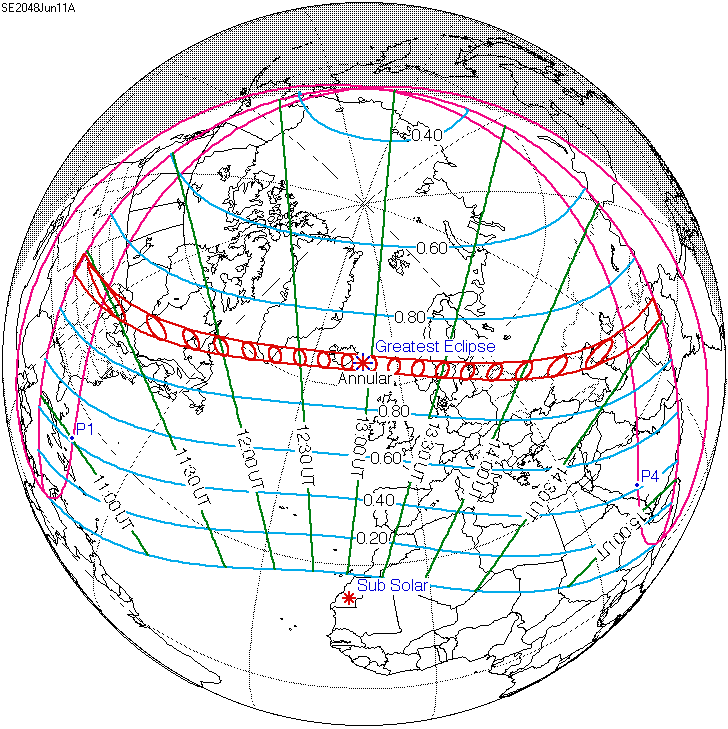
- Map
- Gamma: 0.6468
- Magnitude: 0.9441

Maximum eclipse
- Duration: 298 s (4 min 58 s)
- Coordinates: 63.7°N 11.5°W
- Max. width of band: 272 km (169 mi)

Times (UTC)
- Greatest eclipse: 12:58:53

References
- Saros: 128 (60 of 73)
- Catalog # (SE5000): 9615

An annular solar eclipse will occur at the Moon's descending node of orbit on Thursday, June 11, 2048, with a magnitude of 0.9441. A solar eclipse occurs when the Moon passes between Earth and the Sun, thereby totally or partly obscuring the image of the Sun for a viewer on Earth. An annular solar eclipse occurs when the Moon's apparent diameter is smaller than the Sun's, blocking most of the Sun's light and causing the Sun to look like an annulus (ring). An annular eclipse appears as a partial eclipse over a region of the Earth thousands of kilometres wide. Occurring about 15.5 hours after apogee (on June 10, 2048, at 21:20 UTC), the Moon's apparent diameter will be smaller.

The path of annularity will be visible from parts of Colorado, Kansas, the Oklahoma panhandle, Nebraska, northwestern Missouri, Iowa, southeastern Minnesota, northwestern Illinois, Wisconsin, and Michigan in the United States, eastern Canada, southern Greenland, Iceland, the Faroe Islands, Norway, Sweden, Estonia, Latvia, Lithuania, Belarus, western Russia, eastern Ukraine, southwestern Kazakhstan, southern Uzbekistan, Turkmenistan, southwestern Tajikistan, Afghanistan, and northern Pakistan. A partial solar eclipse will also be visible for parts of North America, Central America, the Caribbean, Europe, North Africa, the Middle East, and Central Asia.

== Images ==
Animated path

== Eclipse timing ==
=== Places experiencing annular eclipse ===
Solar Eclipse of June 11, 2048 (Local Times)
| Country or territory | City or place | Start of partial eclipse | Start of annular eclipse | Maximum eclipse | End of annular eclipse | End of partial eclipse | Duration of annularity (min:s) | Duration of eclipse (hr:min) | Maximum coverage |
|---|---|---|---|---|---|---|---|---|---|
| United States | St. Joseph | 05:50:53 (sunrise) | 06:25:06 | 06:25:52 | 06:26:37 | 07:30:00 | 1:31 | 1:39 | 87.41% |
| United States | Des Moines | 05:39:53 (sunrise) | 06:25:51 | 06:27:50 | 06:29:49 | 07:32:51 | 3:58 | 1:53 | 87.50% |
| United States | Lincoln | 05:54:48 (sunrise) | 06:25:53 | 06:27:57 | 06:30:00 | 07:31:38 | 4:07 | 1:37 | 87.39% |
| United States | Milwaukee | 05:26:57 | 06:28:06 | 06:28:18 | 06:28:30 | 07:35:55 | 0:24 | 2:09 | 87.71% |
| United States | Madison | 05:27:46 | 06:27:00 | 06:28:42 | 06:30:23 | 07:35:43 | 3:23 | 2:08 | 87.67% |
| Canada | Chibougamau | 06:32:01 | 07:38:21 | 07:39:31 | 07:40:41 | 08:54:29 | 2:20 | 2:22 | 88.29% |
| Greenland | Qaqortoq | 09:56:55 | 11:13:39 | 11:16:01 | 11:18:23 | 12:41:05 | 4:44 | 2:44 | 89.04% |
| Iceland | Keflavík | 11:20:11 | 12:42:17 | 12:44:42 | 12:47:06 | 14:10:52 | 4:49 | 2:51 | 89.25% |
| Iceland | Reykjavík | 11:20:56 | 12:43:07 | 12:45:27 | 12:47:47 | 14:11:28 | 4:40 | 2:51 | 89.25% |
| Iceland | Vestmannaeyjar | 11:21:45 | 12:44:47 | 12:47:10 | 12:49:32 | 14:13:48 | 4:45 | 2:52 | 89.28% |
| Faroe Islands | Klaksvík | 12:36:26 | 14:03:34 | 14:04:14 | 14:04:55 | 15:30:09 | 1:21 | 2:54 | 89.31% |
| Norway | Ålesund | 13:52:29 | 15:16:46 | 15:18:54 | 15:21:01 | 16:41:06 | 4:15 | 2:49 | 89.20% |
| Norway | Oslo | 13:59:46 | 15:25:37 | 15:27:14 | 15:28:52 | 16:49:03 | 3:15 | 2:49 | 89.20% |
| Sweden | Uppsala | 14:08:52 | 15:32:04 | 15:34:13 | 15:36:23 | 16:53:19 | 4:19 | 2:44 | 89.09% |
| Sweden | Stockholm | 14:09:57 | 15:33:08 | 15:35:30 | 15:37:53 | 16:54:35 | 4:45 | 2:45 | 89.08% |
| Estonia | Kuressaare | 15:16:49 | 16:39:01 | 16:41:16 | 16:43:30 | 17:58:43 | 4:29 | 2:42 | 89.01% |
| Latvia | Riga | 15:20:35 | 16:42:38 | 16:44:59 | 16:47:20 | 18:01:56 | 4:42 | 2:41 | 88.98% |
| Latvia | Jelgava | 15:20:31 | 16:43:03 | 16:45:13 | 16:47:22 | 18:02:23 | 4:19 | 2:42 | 88.99% |
| Lithuania | Šiauliai | 15:21:02 | 16:45:49 | 16:46:12 | 16:46:36 | 18:03:37 | 0:47 | 2:43 | 89.00% |
| Latvia | Gulbene | 15:23:29 | 16:44:42 | 16:46:35 | 16:48:28 | 18:02:22 | 3:46 | 2:39 | 88.92% |
| Latvia | Daugavpils | 15:25:08 | 16:46:35 | 16:48:52 | 16:51:08 | 18:04:51 | 4:33 | 2:40 | 88.93% |
| Belarus | Vitebsk | 15:30:33 | 16:50:26 | 16:52:43 | 16:55:00 | 18:07:07 | 4:34 | 2:37 | 88.84% |
| Belarus | Mogilev | 15:32:53 | 16:53:21 | 16:55:19 | 16:57:17 | 18:09:38 | 3:56 | 2:37 | 88.83% |
| Russia | Volgograd | 15:56:01 | 17:09:19 | 17:11:23 | 17:13:29 | 18:19:06 | 4:10 | 2:23 | 88.37% |
| Kazakhstan | Aktau | 18:09:36 | 19:19:06 | 19:21:00 | 19:22:55 | 20:25:11 | 3:49 | 2:16 | 88.05% |
| Turkmenistan | Daşoguz | 18:15:43 | 19:22:05 | 19:22:42 | 19:23:20 | 20:23:32 | 1:15 | 2:08 | 87.73% |
| Turkmenistan | Türkmenabat | 18:20:37 | 19:23:46 | 19:25:35 | 19:27:23 | 20:11:54 (sunset) | 3:37 | 1:51 | 87.53% |
| Afghanistan | Mazar-i-Sharif | 17:54:14 | 18:55:18 | 18:57:20 | 18:59:22 | 19:20:34 (sunset) | 4:04 | 1:26 | 87.35% |
| Turkmenistan | Mary | 18:22:55 | 19:26:49 | 19:28:15 | 19:29:41 | 20:14:13 (sunset) | 2:52 | 1:51 | 87.54% |
| Afghanistan | Kabul | 17:57:09 | 18:57:15 | 18:59:01 | 19:00:47 | 19:06:14 (sunset) | 3:32 | 1:09 | 87.22% |

=== Places experiencing partial eclipse ===
Solar Eclipse of June 11, 2048 (Local Times)
| Country or territory | City or place | Start of partial eclipse | Maximum eclipse | End of partial eclipse | Duration of eclipse (hr:min) | Maximum coverage |
|---|---|---|---|---|---|---|
| United States | Washington, D.C. | 06:17:52 | 07:20:53 | 08:31:36 | 2:14 | 68.92% |
| United States | New York City | 06:19:11 | 07:23:53 | 08:36:42 | 2:18 | 69.79% |
| Canada | Toronto | 06:24:11 | 07:28:20 | 08:39:48 | 2:16 | 81.85% |
| Canada | Montreal | 06:25:16 | 07:31:56 | 08:46:36 | 2:21 | 80.04% |
| Greenland | Nuuk | 10:01:12 | 11:17:00 | 12:37:52 | 2:37 | 83.16% |
| Faroe Islands | Tórshavn | 12:36:08 | 14:04:08 | 15:30:14 | 2:54 | 89.12% |
| Ireland | Dublin | 12:36:14 | 14:10:18 | 15:40:43 | 3:04 | 64.95% |
| United Kingdom | London | 12:48:37 | 14:23:10 | 15:51:19 | 3:03 | 62.17% |
| Netherlands | Amsterdam | 13:57:02 | 15:30:25 | 16:56:21 | 2:59 | 67.66% |
| Belgium | Brussels | 13:57:45 | 15:31:43 | 16:57:49 | 3:00 | 62.96% |
| Denmark | Copenhagen | 14:06:12 | 15:35:50 | 16:58:03 | 2:52 | 81.70% |
| Finland | Helsinki | 15:17:17 | 16:39:41 | 17:55:43 | 2:38 | 86.32% |
| Estonia | Tallinn | 15:18:00 | 16:40:52 | 17:57:09 | 2:39 | 87.77% |
| Germany | Berlin | 14:11:25 | 15:42:05 | 17:04:06 | 2:53 | 74.16% |
| Lithuania | Vilnius | 15:25:28 | 16:50:11 | 18:06:46 | 2:41 | 88.39% |
| Poland | Warsaw | 14:23:35 | 15:51:02 | 17:09:29 | 2:46 | 79.79% |
| Belarus | Minsk | 15:29:34 | 16:53:25 | 18:08:58 | 2:39 | 88.51% |
| Austria | Vienna | 14:23:28 | 15:53:31 | 17:13:20 | 2:50 | 65.55% |
| Russia | Moscow | 15:37:21 | 16:55:38 | 18:06:49 | 2:29 | 85.13% |
| Hungary | Budapest | 14:29:12 | 15:57:58 | 17:16:18 | 2:47 | 66.30% |
| Ukraine | Kyiv | 15:39:17 | 17:02:09 | 18:16:03 | 2:37 | 84.35% |
| Kazakhstan | Oral | 17:55:56 | 19:07:45 | 20:13:03 | 2:17 | 80.88% |
| Romania | Bucharest | 15:46:00 | 17:10:35 | 18:24:37 | 2:39 | 66.13% |
| Uzbekistan | Tashkent | 18:17:24 | 19:20:20 | 19:56:15 (sunset) | 1:39 | 81.26% |
| Georgia | Tbilisi | 17:09:51 | 18:23:57 | 19:29:51 | 2:20 | 80.69% |
| Tajikistan | Dushanbe | 18:21:24 | 19:24:10 | 19:49:27 (sunset) | 1:28 | 86.27% |
| Azerbaijan | Baku | 17:15:04 | 18:26:23 | 19:30:09 | 2:15 | 83.26% |
| Armenia | Yerevan | 17:12:43 | 18:26:30 | 19:31:57 | 2:19 | 77.17% |
| Turkmenistan | Ashgabat | 18:21:58 | 19:28:49 | 20:29:05 (sunset) | 2:07 | 86.64% |
| Iran | Tehran | 16:54:30 | 18:03:29 | 19:05:10 | 2:11 | 75.08% |

== Eclipse details ==
Shown below are two tables displaying details about this particular solar eclipse. The first table outlines times at which the Moon's penumbra or umbra attains the specific parameter, and the second table describes various other parameters pertaining to this eclipse.

June 11, 2048 Solar Eclipse Times
| Event | Time (UTC) |
|---|---|
| First Penumbral External Contact | 2048 June 11 at 10:09:44.8 UTC |
| First Umbral External Contact | 2048 June 11 at 11:25:33.1 UTC |
| First Central Line | 2048 June 11 at 11:28:35.8 UTC |
| First Umbral Internal Contact | 2048 June 11 at 11:31:41.1 UTC |
| Ecliptic Conjunction | 2048 June 11 at 12:51:11.2 UTC |
| Equatorial Conjunction | 2048 June 11 at 12:56:14.7 UTC |
| Greatest Duration | 2048 June 11 at 12:57:27.0 UTC |
| Greatest Eclipse | 2048 June 11 at 12:58:52.8 UTC |
| Last Umbral Internal Contact | 2048 June 11 at 14:26:06.6 UTC |
| Last Central Line | 2048 June 11 at 14:29:11.5 UTC |
| Last Umbral External Contact | 2048 June 11 at 14:32:13.6 UTC |
| Last Penumbral External Contact | 2048 June 11 at 15:48:00.9 UTC |

June 11, 2048 Solar Eclipse Parameters
| Parameter | Value |
|---|---|
| Eclipse Magnitude | 0.94415 |
| Eclipse Obscuration | 0.89141 |
| Gamma | 0.64685 |
| Sun Right Ascension | 05h22m03.9s |
| Sun Declination | +23°08'47.0" |
| Sun Semi-Diameter | 15'45.1" |
| Sun Equatorial Horizontal Parallax | 08.7" |
| Moon Right Ascension | 05h22m09.1s |
| Moon Declination | +23°43'34.6" |
| Moon Semi-Diameter | 14'42.3" |
| Moon Equatorial Horizontal Parallax | 0°53'58.0" |
| ΔT | 83.2 s |

== Eclipse season ==
This eclipse is part of an eclipse season, a period, roughly every six months, when eclipses occur. Only two (or occasionally three) eclipse seasons occur each year, and each season lasts about 35 days and repeats just short of six months (173 days) later; thus two full eclipse seasons always occur each year. Either two or three eclipses happen each eclipse season. In the sequence below, each eclipse is separated by a fortnight.

Eclipse season of June 2048
| June 11 Descending node (new moon) | June 26 Ascending node (full moon) |
|---|---|
| Annular solar eclipse Solar Saros 128 | Partial lunar eclipse Lunar Saros 140 |

== Related eclipses ==
=== Eclipses in 2048 ===
- A total lunar eclipse on January 1.
- An annular solar eclipse on June 11.
- A partial lunar eclipse on June 26.
- A total solar eclipse on December 5.
- A penumbral lunar eclipse on December 20.

=== Metonic ===
- Preceded by: Solar eclipse of August 23, 2044
- Followed by: Solar eclipse of March 30, 2052

=== Tzolkinex ===
- Preceded by: Solar eclipse of April 30, 2041
- Followed by: Solar eclipse of July 24, 2055

=== Half-Saros ===
- Preceded by: Lunar eclipse of June 6, 2039
- Followed by: Lunar eclipse of June 17, 2057

=== Tritos ===
- Preceded by: Solar eclipse of July 13, 2037
- Followed by: Solar eclipse of May 11, 2059

=== Solar Saros 128 ===
- Preceded by: Solar eclipse of June 1, 2030
- Followed by: Solar eclipse of June 22, 2066

=== Inex ===
- Preceded by: Solar eclipse of July 2, 2019
- Followed by: Solar eclipse of May 22, 2077

=== Triad ===
- Preceded by: Solar eclipse of August 11, 1961
- Followed by: Solar eclipse of April 13, 2135

=== Solar eclipses of 2047–2050 ===
This eclipse is a member of a semester series. An eclipse in a semester series of solar eclipses repeats approximately every 177 days and 4 hours (a semester) at alternating nodes of the Moon's orbit.

The partial solar eclipses on January 26, 2047 and July 22, 2047 occur in the previous lunar year eclipse set.

Solar eclipse series sets from 2047 to 2050
| Descending node | | | Ascending node | | |
| Saros | Map | Gamma | Saros | Map | Gamma |
| 118 | June 23, 2047 Partial | 1.3766 | 123 | December 16, 2047 Partial | −1.0661 |
| 128 | June 11, 2048 Annular | 0.6468 | 133 | December 5, 2048 Total | −0.3973 |
| 138 | May 31, 2049 Annular | −0.1187 | 143 | November 25, 2049 Hybrid | 0.2943 |
| 148 | May 20, 2050 Hybrid | −0.8688 | 153 | November 14, 2050 Partial | 1.0447 |

=== Saros 128 ===
This eclipse is a part of Saros series 128, repeating every 18 years, 11 days, and containing 73 events. The series started with a partial solar eclipse on August 29, 984 AD. It contains total eclipses from May 16, 1417 through June 18, 1471; hybrid eclipses from June 28, 1489 through July 31, 1543; and annular eclipses from August 11, 1561 through July 25, 2120. The series ends at member 73 as a partial eclipse on November 1, 2282. Its eclipses are tabulated in three columns; every third eclipse in the same column is one exeligmos apart, so they all cast shadows over approximately the same parts of the Earth.

The longest duration of totality was produced by member 27 at 1 minutes, 45 seconds on June 7, 1453, and the longest duration of annularity was produced by member 48 at 8 minutes, 35 seconds on February 1, 1832. All eclipses in this series occur at the Moon’s descending node of orbit.

Series members 47–68 occur between 1801 and 2200:
| 47 | 48 | 49 |
|---|---|---|
| January 21, 1814 | February 1, 1832 | February 12, 1850 |
| 50 | 51 | 52 |
| February 23, 1868 | March 5, 1886 | March 17, 1904 |
| 53 | 54 | 55 |
| March 28, 1922 | April 7, 1940 | April 19, 1958 |
| 56 | 57 | 58 |
| April 29, 1976 | May 10, 1994 | May 20, 2012 |
| 59 | 60 | 61 |
| June 1, 2030 | June 11, 2048 | June 22, 2066 |
| 62 | 63 | 64 |
| July 3, 2084 | July 15, 2102 | July 25, 2120 |
| 65 | 66 | 67 |
| August 5, 2138 | August 16, 2156 | August 27, 2174 |
68
September 6, 2192

=== Metonic series ===
The metonic series repeats eclipses every 19 years (6939.69 days), lasting about 5 cycles. Eclipses occur in nearly the same calendar date. In addition, the octon subseries repeats 1/5 of that or every 3.8 years (1387.94 days). All eclipses in this table occur at the Moon's descending node.

22 eclipse events between June 12, 2029 and November 4, 2116
| June 11–12 | March 30–31 | January 16 | November 4–5 | August 23–24 |
| 118 | 120 | 122 | 124 | 126 |
|---|---|---|---|---|
| June 12, 2029 | March 30, 2033 | January 16, 2037 | November 4, 2040 | August 23, 2044 |
| 128 | 130 | 132 | 134 | 136 |
| June 11, 2048 | March 30, 2052 | January 16, 2056 | November 5, 2059 | August 24, 2063 |
| 138 | 140 | 142 | 144 | 146 |
| June 11, 2067 | March 31, 2071 | January 16, 2075 | November 4, 2078 | August 24, 2082 |
| 148 | 150 | 152 | 154 | 156 |
| June 11, 2086 | March 31, 2090 | January 16, 2094 | November 4, 2097 | August 24, 2101 |
| 158 | 160 | 162 | 164 | |
| June 12, 2105 | | | November 4, 2116 | |

=== Tritos series ===
This eclipse is a part of a tritos cycle, repeating at alternating nodes every 135 synodic months (≈ 3986.63 days, or 11 years minus 1 month). Their appearance and longitude are irregular due to a lack of synchronization with the anomalistic month (period of perigee), but groupings of 3 tritos cycles (≈ 33 years minus 3 months) come close (≈ 434.044 anomalistic months), so eclipses are similar in these groupings.

Series members between 1801 and 2200
| March 25, 1819 (Saros 107) | February 23, 1830 (Saros 108) | January 22, 1841 (Saros 109) | | November 21, 1862 (Saros 111) |
| | | August 20, 1895 (Saros 114) | July 21, 1906 (Saros 115) | June 19, 1917 (Saros 116) |
| May 19, 1928 (Saros 117) | April 19, 1939 (Saros 118) | March 18, 1950 (Saros 119) | February 15, 1961 (Saros 120) | January 16, 1972 (Saros 121) |
| December 15, 1982 (Saros 122) | November 13, 1993 (Saros 123) | October 14, 2004 (Saros 124) | September 13, 2015 (Saros 125) | August 12, 2026 (Saros 126) |
| July 13, 2037 (Saros 127) | June 11, 2048 (Saros 128) | May 11, 2059 (Saros 129) | April 11, 2070 (Saros 130) | March 10, 2081 (Saros 131) |
| February 7, 2092 (Saros 132) | January 8, 2103 (Saros 133) | December 8, 2113 (Saros 134) | November 6, 2124 (Saros 135) | October 7, 2135 (Saros 136) |
| September 6, 2146 (Saros 137) | August 5, 2157 (Saros 138) | July 5, 2168 (Saros 139) | June 5, 2179 (Saros 140) | May 4, 2190 (Saros 141) |

=== Inex series ===
This eclipse is a part of the long period inex cycle, repeating at alternating nodes, every 358 synodic months (≈ 10,571.95 days, or 29 years minus 20 days). Their appearance and longitude are irregular due to a lack of synchronization with the anomalistic month (period of perigee). However, groupings of 3 inex cycles (≈ 87 years minus 2 months) comes close (≈ 1,151.02 anomalistic months), so eclipses are similar in these groupings.

Series members between 1801 and 2200
| November 19, 1816 (Saros 120) | October 30, 1845 (Saros 121) | October 10, 1874 (Saros 122) |
| September 21, 1903 (Saros 123) | August 31, 1932 (Saros 124) | August 11, 1961 (Saros 125) |
| July 22, 1990 (Saros 126) | July 2, 2019 (Saros 127) | June 11, 2048 (Saros 128) |
| May 22, 2077 (Saros 129) | May 3, 2106 (Saros 130) | April 13, 2135 (Saros 131) |
| March 23, 2164 (Saros 132) | March 3, 2193 (Saros 133) | |
