= Solar eclipse of August 2, 2046 =

Total eclipse

- Total eclipse
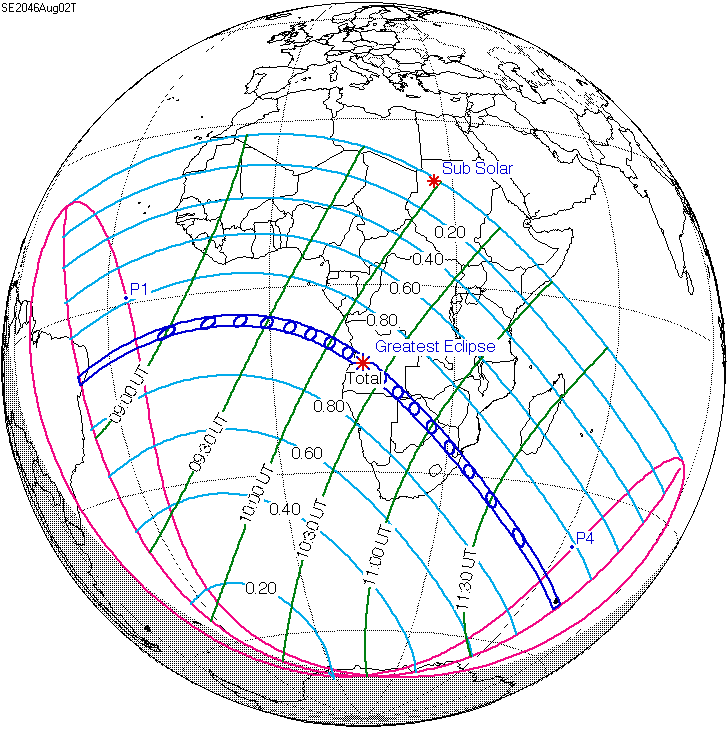
- Map
- Gamma: −0.535
- Magnitude: 1.0531

Maximum eclipse
- Duration: 291 s (4 min 51 s)
- Coordinates: 12.7°S 15.2°E
- Max. width of band: 206 km (128 mi)

Times (UTC)
- Greatest eclipse: 10:21:13

References
- Saros: 146 (29 of 76)
- Catalog # (SE5000): 9610

A total solar eclipse will occur at the Moon's descending node of orbit on Thursday, August 2, 2046, with a magnitude of 1.0531. A solar eclipse occurs when the Moon passes between Earth and the Sun, thereby totally or partly obscuring the image of the Sun for a viewer on Earth. A total solar eclipse occurs when the Moon's apparent diameter is greater than the Sun's, blocking all direct sunlight. Totality occurs in a narrow path across Earth's surface, with the partial solar eclipse visible over a surrounding region thousands of kilometres wide. Occurring about 2 days before perigee (on August 4, 2046, at 10:20 UTC), the Moon's apparent diameter will be larger.

The path of totality will be visible from parts of eastern Brazil, Angola, the panhandle of Namibia, Botswana, South Africa, Eswatini, extreme southern Mozambique, and the Kerguelen Islands. A partial solar eclipse will also be visible for parts of eastern South America, Africa, and East Antarctica.

== Images ==
Animated path

== Eclipse timing ==
=== Places experiencing total eclipse ===
Solar Eclipse of August 2, 2046 (Local Times)
Country or territory	City or place	Start of partial eclipse	Start of total eclipse	Maximum eclipse	End of total eclipse	End of partial eclipse	Duration of totality (min:s)	Duration of eclipse (hr:min)	Maximum magnitude
Brazil	Maceió	05:38:09 (sunrise)	05:50:02	05:51:02	05:52:03	06:56:40	2:01	1:19	1.0102
Brazil	Aracaju	05:45:11 (sunrise)	05:50:58	05:51:38	05:52:19	06:56:34	1:21	1:11	1.0043
Angola	Huambo	09:49:19	11:19:26	11:21:44	11:24:01	12:53:33	4:35	3:04	1.0178
Angola	Menongue	09:56:56	11:27:09	11:29:34	11:31:59	13:00:05	4:50	3:03	1.0263
Botswana	Maun	11:19:16	12:48:26	12:50:33	12:52:40	14:16:23	4:14	2:57	1.0168
Botswana	Serowe	11:30:40	12:58:09	13:00:21	13:02:33	14:23:29	4:24	2:53	1.0238
Botswana	Shoshong	11:31:12	12:58:57	13:00:42	13:02:28	14:23:44	3:31	2:53	1.0109
Botswana	Lerala	11:33:41	13:01:04	13:02:52	13:04:41	14:25:15	3:37	2:52	1.0116
South Africa	Polokwane	11:39:09	13:06:26	13:07:18	13:08:09	14:28:18	1:43	2:49	1.0023
South Africa	Mbombela	11:44:38	13:10:09	13:11:35	13:13:01	14:31:13	2:52	2:47	1.0072
South Africa	Matsulu	11:45:28	13:11:42	13:12:15	13:12:48	14:31:39	1:06	2:46	1.0011
Eswatini	Mbabane	11:46:05	13:10:36	13:12:39	13:14:42	14:31:55	4:06	2:46	1.0229
Eswatini	Manzini	11:46:48	13:11:10	13:13:12	13:15:14	14:32:17	4:04	2:45	1.0221
Eswatini	Big Bend	11:48:22	13:12:28	13:14:25	13:16:21	14:33:05	3:53	2:45	1.018
French Southern and Antarctic Lands	Port-aux-Français	15:45:34	16:47:52	16:48:51	16:49:51	17:04:15 (sunset)	1:59	1:19	1.0097

=== Places experiencing partial eclipse ===
Solar Eclipse of August 2, 2046 (Local Times)
Country or territory	City or place	Start of partial eclipse	Maximum eclipse	End of partial eclipse	Duration of eclipse (hr:min)	Maximum coverage
Brazil	Fortaleza	05:41:42 (sunrise)	05:46:28	06:48:15	1:07	76.98%
Brazil	Recife	05:32:45 (sunrise)	05:50:08	06:56:01	1:23	97.30%
Brazil	Salvador	05:53:32 (sunrise)	05:55:49	06:57:12	1:04	93.66%
Sierra Leone	Freetown	07:53:26	08:56:49	10:08:39	2:15	52.39%
Liberia	Monrovia	07:53:47	09:00:58	10:17:31	2:24	61.40%
Saint Helena, Ascension and Tristan da Cunha	Georgetown	07:56:48	09:07:26	10:29:15	2:32	94.60%
Ivory Coast	Yamoussoukro	07:58:14	09:08:47	10:28:35	2:30	59.90%
Ivory Coast	Abidjan	07:59:11	09:12:00	10:34:26	2:35	65.41%
Ghana	Accra	08:03:36	09:18:42	10:42:43	2:39	63.24%
Togo	Lomé	08:05:33	09:20:53	10:44:37	2:39	60.29%
Benin	Porto-Novo	09:07:36	10:23:16	11:46:52	2:39	58.05%
Nigeria	Lagos	09:08:40	10:24:44	11:48:32	2:40	57.65%
Saint Helena, Ascension and Tristan da Cunha	Jamestown	08:16:36	09:33:05	10:59:25	2:43	68.95%
São Tomé and Príncipe	São Tomé	08:15:29	09:39:12	11:09:56	2:54	76.55%
Equatorial Guinea	Malabo	09:18:05	10:39:25	12:06:36	2:49	61.90%
Cameroon	Yaoundé	09:23:41	10:45:28	12:11:41	2:48	57.70%
Gabon	Libreville	09:20:38	10:45:30	12:15:53	2:55	72.79%
Republic of the Congo	Brazzaville	09:37:05	11:06:46	12:37:47	3:01	78.31%
Democratic Republic of the Congo	Kinshasa	09:37:13	11:06:55	12:37:57	3:01	78.44%
Angola	Luanda	09:37:45	11:09:00	12:42:07	3:04	96.60%
Namibia	Rundu	11:07:14	12:39:25	14:07:54	3:01	99.59%
Namibia	Windhoek	11:09:47	12:39:33	14:06:36	2:57	81.73%
Zambia	Lusaka	11:24:55	12:54:33	14:17:32	2:53	80.34%
Botswana	Gaborone	11:32:22	13:01:18	14:23:59	2:52	96.53%
Zimbabwe	Harare	11:35:18	13:03:16	14:23:52	2:49	79.99%
Malawi	Lilongwe	11:38:59	13:03:16	14:20:19	2:41	61.33%
South Africa	Johannesburg	11:39:18	13:06:58	14:27:56	2:49	97.40%
Lesotho	Maseru	11:42:42	13:08:42	14:28:23	2:46	87.92%
Mozambique	Maputo	11:48:44	13:14:46	14:33:17	2:45	99.07%
French Southern and Antarctic Lands	Île de la Possession	15:31:26	16:41:16	17:45:50	2:14	88.35%

== Eclipse details ==
Shown below are two tables displaying details about this particular solar eclipse. The first table outlines times at which the Moon's penumbra or umbra attains the specific parameter, and the second table describes various other parameters pertaining to this eclipse.

August 2, 2046 Solar Eclipse Times
Event	Time (UTC)
First Penumbral External Contact	2046 August 2 at 07:49:48.4 UTC
First Umbral External Contact	2046 August 2 at 08:51:12.0 UTC
First Central Line	2046 August 2 at 08:52:25.1 UTC
First Umbral Internal Contact	2046 August 2 at 08:53:38.5 UTC
Greatest Duration	2046 August 2 at 10:17:25.2 UTC
Greatest Eclipse	2046 August 2 at 10:21:13.4 UTC
Ecliptic Conjunction	2046 August 2 at 10:26:44.5 UTC
Equatorial Conjunction	2046 August 2 at 10:43:07.1 UTC
Last Umbral Internal Contact	2046 August 2 at 11:48:31.9 UTC
Last Central Line	2046 August 2 at 11:49:47.3 UTC
Last Umbral External Contact	2046 August 2 at 11:51:02.5 UTC
Last Penumbral External Contact	2046 August 2 at 12:52:25.2 UTC

August 2, 2046 Solar Eclipse Parameters
Parameter	Value
Eclipse Magnitude	1.05315
Eclipse Obscuration	1.10912
Gamma	−0.53496
Sun Right Ascension	08h51m04.7s
Sun Declination	+17°39'03.1"
Sun Semi-Diameter	15'45.5"
Sun Equatorial Horizontal Parallax	08.7"
Moon Right Ascension	08h50m16.1s
Moon Declination	+17°09'10.7"
Moon Semi-Diameter	16'21.8"
Moon Equatorial Horizontal Parallax	1°00'03.4"
ΔT	82.1 s

== Eclipse season ==
This eclipse is part of an eclipse season, a period, roughly every six months, when eclipses occur. Only two (or occasionally three) eclipse seasons occur each year, and each season lasts about 35 days and repeats just short of six months (173 days) later; thus two full eclipse seasons always occur each year. Either two or three eclipses happen each eclipse season. In the sequence below, each eclipse is separated by a fortnight.

Eclipse season of July–August 2046
July 18 Ascending node (full moon)	August 2 Descending node (new moon)
Partial lunar eclipse Lunar Saros 120	Total solar eclipse Solar Saros 146

== Related eclipses ==
=== Eclipses in 2046 ===
- A partial lunar eclipse on January 22.
- An annular solar eclipse on February 5.
- A partial lunar eclipse on July 18.
- A total solar eclipse on August 2.

=== Metonic ===
- Preceded by: Solar eclipse of October 14, 2042
- Followed by: Solar eclipse of May 20, 2050

=== Tzolkinex ===
- Preceded by: Solar eclipse of June 21, 2039
- Followed by: Solar eclipse of September 12, 2053

=== Half-Saros ===
- Preceded by: Lunar eclipse of July 27, 2037
- Followed by: Lunar eclipse of August 7, 2055

=== Tritos ===
- Preceded by: Solar eclipse of September 2, 2035
- Followed by: Solar eclipse of July 1, 2057

=== Solar Saros 146 ===
- Preceded by: Solar eclipse of July 22, 2028
- Followed by: Solar eclipse of August 12, 2064

=== Inex ===
- Preceded by: Solar eclipse of August 21, 2017
- Followed by: Solar eclipse of July 13, 2075

=== Triad ===
- Preceded by: Solar eclipse of October 2, 1959
- Followed by: Solar eclipse of June 3, 2133

=== Solar eclipses of 2044–2047 ===
This eclipse is a member of a semester series. An eclipse in a semester series of solar eclipses repeats approximately every 177 days and 4 hours (a semester) at alternating nodes of the Moon's orbit.

The partial solar eclipses on June 23, 2047 and December 16, 2047 occur in the next lunar year eclipse set.

Solar eclipse series sets from 2044 to 2047
Ascending node			Descending node		
Saros	Map	Gamma	Saros	Map	Gamma
121	February 28, 2044 Annular	−0.9954	126	August 23, 2044 Total	0.9613
131	February 16, 2045 Annular	−0.3125	136	August 12, 2045 Total	0.2116
141	February 5, 2046 Annular	0.3765	146	August 2, 2046 Total	−0.535
151	January 26, 2047 Partial	1.045	156	July 22, 2047 Partial	−1.3477

=== Saros 146 ===
This eclipse is a part of Saros series 146, repeating every 18 years, 11 days, and containing 76 events. The series started with a partial solar eclipse on September 19, 1541. It contains total eclipses from May 29, 1938 through October 7, 2154; hybrid eclipses from October 17, 2172 through November 20, 2226; and annular eclipses from November 30, 2244 through August 10, 2659. The series ends at member 76 as a partial eclipse on December 29, 2893. Its eclipses are tabulated in three columns; every third eclipse in the same column is one exeligmos apart, so they all cast shadows over approximately the same parts of the Earth.

The longest duration of totality was produced by member 26 at 5 minutes, 21 seconds on June 30, 1992, and the longest duration of annularity will be produced by member 63 at 3 minutes, 30 seconds on August 10, 2659. All eclipses in this series occur at the Moon’s descending node of orbit.

Series members 16–37 occur between 1801 and 2200:
16	17	18
March 13, 1812	March 24, 1830	April 3, 1848
19	20	21
April 15, 1866	April 25, 1884	May 7, 1902
22	23	24
May 18, 1920	May 29, 1938	June 8, 1956
25	26	27
June 20, 1974	June 30, 1992	July 11, 2010
28	29	30
July 22, 2028	August 2, 2046	August 12, 2064
31	32	33
August 24, 2082	September 4, 2100	September 15, 2118
34	35	36
September 26, 2136	October 7, 2154	October 17, 2172
37
October 29, 2190

=== Metonic series ===
The metonic series repeats eclipses every 19 years (6939.69 days), lasting about 5 cycles. Eclipses occur in nearly the same calendar date. In addition, the octon subseries repeats 1/5 of that or every 3.8 years (1387.94 days). All eclipses in this table occur at the Moon's descending node.

21 eclipse events between May 21, 1993 and May 20, 2069
May 20–21	March 9	December 25–26	October 13–14	August 1–2
118	120	122	124	126
May 21, 1993	March 9, 1997	December 25, 2000	October 14, 2004	August 1, 2008
128	130	132	134	136
May 20, 2012	March 9, 2016	December 26, 2019	October 14, 2023	August 2, 2027
138	140	142	144	146
May 21, 2031	March 9, 2035	December 26, 2038	October 14, 2042	August 2, 2046
148	150	152	154	156
May 20, 2050	March 9, 2054	December 26, 2057	October 13, 2061	August 2, 2065
158
May 20, 2069

=== Tritos series ===
This eclipse is a part of a tritos cycle, repeating at alternating nodes every 135 synodic months (≈ 3986.63 days, or 11 years minus 1 month). Their appearance and longitude are irregular due to a lack of synchronization with the anomalistic month (period of perigee), but groupings of 3 tritos cycles (≈ 33 years minus 3 months) come close (≈ 434.044 anomalistic months), so eclipses are similar in these groupings.

Series members between 1801 and 2200
June 16, 1806 (Saros 124)	May 16, 1817 (Saros 125)	April 14, 1828 (Saros 126)	March 15, 1839 (Saros 127)	February 12, 1850 (Saros 128)
January 11, 1861 (Saros 129)	December 12, 1871 (Saros 130)	November 10, 1882 (Saros 131)	October 9, 1893 (Saros 132)	September 9, 1904 (Saros 133)
August 10, 1915 (Saros 134)	July 9, 1926 (Saros 135)	June 8, 1937 (Saros 136)	May 9, 1948 (Saros 137)	April 8, 1959 (Saros 138)
March 7, 1970 (Saros 139)	February 4, 1981 (Saros 140)	January 4, 1992 (Saros 141)	December 4, 2002 (Saros 142)	November 3, 2013 (Saros 143)
October 2, 2024 (Saros 144)	September 2, 2035 (Saros 145)	August 2, 2046 (Saros 146)	July 1, 2057 (Saros 147)	May 31, 2068 (Saros 148)
May 1, 2079 (Saros 149)	March 31, 2090 (Saros 150)	February 28, 2101 (Saros 151)	January 29, 2112 (Saros 152)	December 28, 2122 (Saros 153)
November 26, 2133 (Saros 154)	October 26, 2144 (Saros 155)	September 26, 2155 (Saros 156)	August 25, 2166 (Saros 157)	July 25, 2177 (Saros 158)
June 24, 2188 (Saros 159)	May 24, 2199 (Saros 160)			

=== Inex series ===
This eclipse is a part of the long period inex cycle, repeating at alternating nodes, every 358 synodic months (≈ 10,571.95 days, or 29 years minus 20 days). Their appearance and longitude are irregular due to a lack of synchronization with the anomalistic month (period of perigee). However, groupings of 3 inex cycles (≈ 87 years minus 2 months) comes close (≈ 1,151.02 anomalistic months), so eclipses are similar in these groupings.

Series members between 1801 and 2200
January 10, 1815 (Saros 138)	December 21, 1843 (Saros 139)	November 30, 1872 (Saros 140)
November 11, 1901 (Saros 141)	October 21, 1930 (Saros 142)	October 2, 1959 (Saros 143)
September 11, 1988 (Saros 144)	August 21, 2017 (Saros 145)	August 2, 2046 (Saros 146)
July 13, 2075 (Saros 147)	June 22, 2104 (Saros 148)	June 3, 2133 (Saros 149)
May 14, 2162 (Saros 150)	April 23, 2191 (Saros 151)	
