= Solar Saros 156 =

Saros cycle series 156 for solar eclipses

Saros cycle series 156 for solar eclipses occurs at the Moon's descending node, repeating every 18 years, 11 days, containing 69 eclipses, 52 of which will be umbral (all annular). The first, and so far only, eclipse in the series was on 1 July 2011 and the last will be on 14 July 3237. The next eclipse will be a partial eclipse on 11 July 2029. This series is the most recent series to begin.

The longest eclipse will be 8 minutes 28 seconds on 3 May 2516.

This solar saros is linked to Lunar Saros 149.

== Umbral eclipses ==
Umbral eclipses (annular, total and hybrid) can be further classified as either: 1) Central (two limits), 2) Central (one limit) or 3) Non-Central (one limit). The statistical distribution of these classes in Saros series 156 appears in the following table.

Classification	Number	Percent
All Umbral eclipses	52	100.00%
Central (two limits)	51	98.08%
Central (one limit)	1	1.92%
Non-central (one limit)	0	0.00%

== All eclipses ==
Saros	Member	Date	Time (Greatest) UTC	Type	Location Lat, Long	Gamma	Mag.	Width (km)	Duration (min:sec)	Ref
156	1	July 1, 2011	8:39:30	Partial	65.2S 28.6E	-1.4917	0.0971			
156	2	July 11, 2029	15:37:19	Partial	64.3S 85.6W	-1.4191	0.2303			
156	3	July 22, 2047	22:36:17	Partial	63.4S 160.2E	-1.3477	0.3604			
156	4	August 2, 2065	5:34:17	Partial	62.7S 46.5E	-1.2759	0.4903			
156	5	August 13, 2083	12:34:41	Partial	62.1S 67.5W	-1.2064	0.6146			
156	6	August 24, 2101	19:37:03	Partial	61.6S 178.2E	-1.1392	0.7337			
156	7	September 5, 2119	2:44:27	Partial	61.2S 62.8E	-1.0766	0.8431			
156	8	September 15, 2137	9:56:34	Partial	61S 53.8W	-1.0184	0.9436			
156	9	September 26, 2155	17:14:27	Annular	58.6S 143W	-0.9654	0.9593	570	2m 55s	
156	10	October 7, 2173	0:39:14	Annular	57.8S 114E	-0.9187	0.9558	402	3m 17s	
156	11	October 18, 2191	8:11:12	Annular	58.7S 5.2E	-0.8783	0.9516	365	3m 39s	
156	12	October 29, 2209	15:50:20	Annular	60.7S 106.3W	-0.8445	0.9472	358	4m 2s	
156	13	November 9, 2227	23:36:42	Annular	63.3S 140.7E	-0.8171	0.9429	364	4m 24s	
156	14	November 20, 2245	7:29:36	Annular	66.3S 27.1E	-0.7955	0.9387	374	4m 45s	
156	15	December 1, 2263	15:28:45	Annular	69.2S 85.8W	-0.7794	0.9349	388	5m 6s	
156	16	December 11, 2281	23:31:24	Annular	71.4S 163.7E	-0.7667	0.9316	400	5m 26s	
156	17	December 23, 2299	7:38:42	Annular	72.5S 54.8E	-0.7584	0.9288	413	5m 45s	
156	18	January 3, 2318	15:47:14	Annular	71.9S 53.7W	-0.7519	0.9265	422	6m 2s	
156	19	January 14, 2336	23:56:42	Annular	69.6S 164.9W	-0.7463	0.925	427	6m 19s	
156	20	January 25, 2354	8:03:20	Annular	66S 80.6E	-0.7388	0.924	427	6m 35s	
156	21	February 5, 2372	16:07:48	Annular	61.5S 36.9W	-0.7301	0.9237	422	6m 50s	
156	22	February 16, 2390	0:06:58	Annular	56.4S 155.6W	-0.7177	0.9239	411	7m 6s	
156	23	February 27, 2408	7:59:40	Annular	50.8S 85.5E	-0.7004	0.9249	394	7m 22s	
156	24	March 9, 2426	15:44:45	Annular	44.7S 32.5W	-0.6774	0.9262	374	7m 38s	
156	25	March 19, 2444	23:21:38	Annular	38.3S 149.1W	-0.6476	0.928	351	7m 53s	
156	26	March 31, 2462	6:49:44	Annular	31.7S 96.3E	-0.6111	0.9302	327	8m 7s	
156	27	April 10, 2480	14:07:46	Annular	24.8S 16W	-0.5664	0.9326	303	8m 18s	
156	28	April 21, 2498	21:17:12	Annular	17.9S 125.9W	-0.5148	0.9351	280	8m 26s	
156	29	May 3, 2516	4:17:47	Annular	10.9S 126.7E	-0.4559	0.9377	259	8m 28s	
156	30	May 14, 2534	11:09:29	Annular	4.1S 21.9E	-0.3896	0.9402	240	8m 23s	
156	31	May 24, 2552	17:54:09	Annular	2.5N 80.5W	-0.3174	0.9425	224	8m 9s	
156	32	June 5, 2570	0:32:17	Annular	8.7N 179.4E	-0.2395	0.9446	211	7m 48s	
156	33	June 15, 2588	7:06:20	Annular	14.3N 81.1E	-0.1582	0.9463	200	7m 21s	
156	34	June 27, 2606	13:34:39	Annular	19.3N 15W	-0.072	0.9477	193	6m 52s	
156	35	July 7, 2624	20:02:10	Annular	23.4N 110.2W	0.015	0.9487	188	6m 24s	
156	36	July 19, 2642	2:27:54	Annular	26.6N 155.8E	0.104	0.9493	187	6m 0s	
156	37	July 29, 2660	8:55:21	Annular	28.9N 61.8E	0.1914	0.9495	189	5m 42s	
156	38	August 9, 2678	15:23:56	Annular	30.4N 32.2W	0.2782	0.9492	194	5m 30s	
156	39	August 19, 2696	21:57:56	Annular	31.1N 127.6W	0.3608	0.9485	201	5m 24s	
156	40	September 1, 2714	4:36:50	Annular	31.3N 135.5E	0.4397	0.9474	213	5m 24s	
156	41	September 11, 2732	11:21:54	Annular	31.1N 36.6E	0.5138	0.9461	227	5m 29s	
156	42	September 22, 2750	18:14:45	Annular	30.9N 64.7W	0.5817	0.9445	246	5m 40s	
156	43	October 3, 2768	1:16:28	Annular	30.7N 168.8W	0.6427	0.9428	269	5m 54s	
156	44	October 14, 2786	8:28:06	Annular	30.8N 84E	0.6961	0.941	296	6m 11s	
156	45	October 24, 2804	15:48:02	Annular	31.2N 26W	0.7433	0.9392	327	6m 30s	
156	46	November 4, 2822	23:19:12	Annular	31.9N 139.4W	0.7817	0.9376	362	6m 49s	
156	47	November 15, 2840	6:59:00	Annular	32.9N 104.4E	0.8135	0.9363	399	7m 5s	
156	48	November 26, 2858	14:48:33	Annular	34.1N 14.9W	0.8377	0.9354	435	7m 17s	
156	49	December 6, 2876	22:44:54	Annular	35.5N 136.5W	0.857	0.9349	468	7m 22s	
156	50	December 18, 2894	6:49:29	Annular	37N 99.4E	0.87	0.935	492	7m 20s	
156	51	December 29, 2912	14:58:37	Annular	38.8N 26.2W	0.8798	0.9356	507	7m 10s	
156	52	January 9, 2931	23:12:05	Annular	40.7N 153.2W	0.8864	0.9369	510	6m 52s	
156	53	January 20, 2949	7:27:37	Annular	43N 79.2E	0.8919	0.9388	504	6m 26s	
156	54	January 31, 2967	15:44:49	Annular	45.6N 49.1W	0.8961	0.9413	490	5m 55s	
156	55	February 11, 2985	0:00:02	Annular	48.9N 177.3W	0.9028	0.9444	477	5m 19s	
156	56	February 23, 3003	8:13:25	Annular	52.9N 54.4E	0.9116	0.9479	465	4m 41s	
156	57	March 5, 3021	16:22:29	Annular	57.6N 74.1W	0.9243	0.9518	463	4m 02s	
156	58	March 17, 3039	0:28:08	Annular	62.9N 156.0E	0.9405	0.9560	477	3m 25s	
156	59	March 27, 3057	8:25:59	Annular	69.0N 21.1E	0.9637	0.9601	559	2m 50s	
156	60	April 7, 3075	16:19:22	Annular (Note: One limit)	73.5N 135.4W	0.9913	0.9632		2m 19s	
156	61	April 18, 3093	0:04:23	Partial	71.4N 75.4E	1.0267	0.9310			
156	62	April 30, 3111	7:04:44	Partial	70.7N 52.2W	1.0664	0.8629			
156	63	May 10, 3129	15:16:03	Partial	69.8N 176.9W	1.1142	0.7796			
156	64	May 21, 3147	22:43:49	Partial	68.9N 59.9E	1.1655	0.6887			
156	65	June 1, 3165	6:04:31	Partial	67.9N 60.9W	1.2235	0.5848			
156	66	June 12, 3183	13:21:59	Partial	66.9N 179.6E	1.2845	0.4740			
156	67	June 22, 3201	20:34:47	Partial	65.9N 61.7E	1.3499	0.3541			
156	68	July 4, 3219	3:46:45	Partial	65.0N 55.5W	1.4166	0.2307			
156	69	July 14, 3237	10:57:04	Partial	64.1N 172.0W	1.4851	0.1030			
