= Solar eclipse of July 11, 2029 =

Future partial solar eclipse

- Partial eclipse
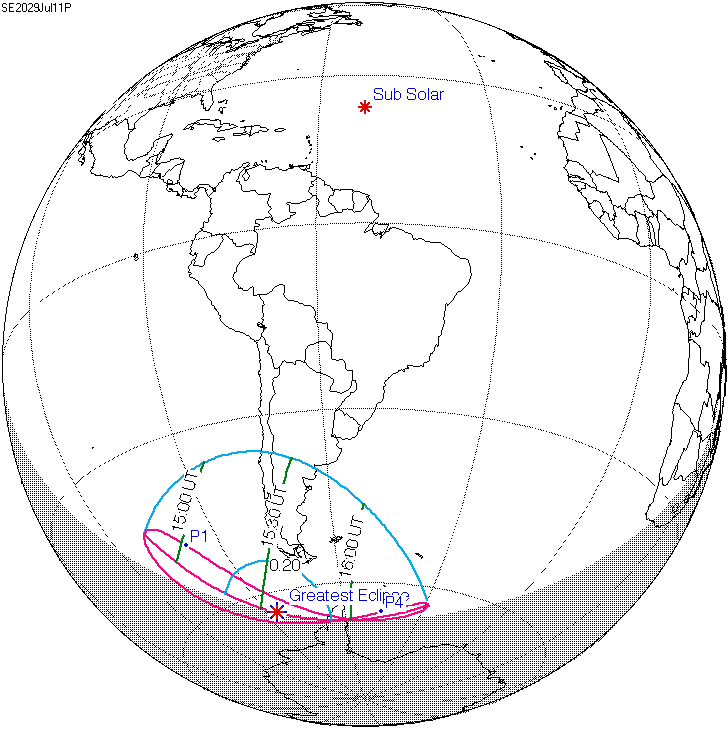
- Map
- Gamma: −1.4191
- Magnitude: 0.2303

Maximum eclipse
- Coordinates: 64.3°S 85.6°W

Times (UTC)
- Greatest eclipse: 15:37:19

References
- Saros: 156 (2 of 69)
- Catalog # (SE5000): 9573

A partial solar eclipse will occur at the Moon's descending node of orbit on Wednesday, July 11, 2029, with a magnitude of 0.2303. A solar eclipse occurs when the Moon passes between Earth and the Sun, thereby totally or partly obscuring the image of the Sun for a viewer on Earth. A partial solar eclipse occurs in the polar regions of the Earth when the center of the Moon's shadow misses the Earth.

This will be the third of four partial solar eclipses in 2029, with the others occurring on January 14, June 12, and December 5.

A partial eclipse will be visible for parts of southern Chile and Argentina.

== Images ==
Animated path

== Eclipse timing ==
=== Places experiencing partial eclipse ===
Solar Eclipse of July 11, 2029 (Local Times)
Country or territory	City or place	Start of partial eclipse	Maximum eclipse	End of partial eclipse	Duration of eclipse (hr:min)	Maximum coverage
Chile	Talcahuano	11:04:11	11:19:12	11:34:23	0:30	0.20%
Chile	Concepción	11:03:41	11:19:26	11:35:21	0:32	0.23%
Chile	Chillán	11:08:06	11:20:44	11:33:27	0:25	0.11%
Chile	Temuco	10:57:16	11:22:18	11:47:45	0:50	0.98%
Chile	Valdivia	10:53:21	11:22:27	11:52:07	0:59	1.61%
Chile	Osorno	10:52:15	11:23:28	11:55:18	1:03	2.02%
Chile	Villarrica	10:56:42	11:23:28	11:50:41	0:54	1.21%
Chile	Puerto Montt	10:51:24	11:24:45	11:58:48	1:07	2.51%
Argentina	Bariloche	11:55:15	12:26:57	12:59:12	1:04	2.09%
Argentina	Esquel	11:53:07	12:28:47	13:05:06	1:12	3.11%
Argentina	Neuquén	12:09:14	12:29:52	12:50:41	0:41	0.52%
Chile	Coyhaique	11:50:08	12:30:26	13:11:33	1:21	4.85%
Argentina	El Calafate	11:49:55	12:34:55	13:20:45	1:31	7.60%
Argentina	Comodoro Rivadavia	11:59:06	12:37:29	13:16:18	1:17	4.00%
Argentina	Rawson	12:07:32	12:38:51	13:10:20	1:03	1.97%
Chile	Punta Arenas	11:53:06	12:39:17	13:26:08	1:33	8.68%
Argentina	Viedma	12:21:08	12:40:01	12:58:57	0:38	0.39%
Argentina	Río Gallegos	11:55:12	12:40:07	13:25:35	1:30	7.56%
Argentina	Puerto Deseado	12:01:39	12:41:28	13:21:35	1:20	4.61%
Argentina	Río Grande	11:58:23	12:43:49	13:29:38	1:31	8.15%
Argentina	Ushuaia	11:57:51	12:43:51	13:30:17	1:32	8.74%
Chile	Puerto Williams	11:59:00	12:44:48	13:30:58	1:32	8.60%
Antarctica	Rothera Research Station	12:17:01 (sunrise)	12:52:14	13:36:56	1:20	10.82%
Antarctica	Palmer Station	12:09:39	12:54:14	13:38:50	1:29	9.97%
Falkland Islands	Stanley	12:18:14	12:55:18	13:32:09	1:14	3.93%
Antarctica	Carlini Base	12:15:29	12:58:16	13:40:53	1:25	8.11%
Antarctica	Esperanza Base	12:18:10	13:00:06	13:41:47	1:24	7.82%
Antarctica	Marambio Base	12:18:53	13:00:35	13:42:02	1:23	7.86%
Antarctica	San Martín Base	12:33:04 (sunrise)	13:03:38	13:37:29	1:04	9.65%
Antarctica	Orcadas Base	12:40:31	13:11:32	13:42:07	1:02	2.92%

== Eclipse details ==
Shown below are two tables displaying details about this particular solar eclipse. The first table outlines times at which the Moon's penumbra or umbra attains the specific parameter, and the second table describes various other parameters pertaining to this eclipse.

July 11, 2029 Solar Eclipse Times
Event	Time (UTC)
First Penumbral External Contact	2029 July 11 at 14:28:56.7 UTC
Greatest Eclipse	2029 July 11 at 15:37:18.9 UTC
Ecliptic Conjunction	2029 July 11 at 15:52:13.6 UTC
Equatorial Conjunction	2029 July 11 at 16:15:41.3 UTC
Last Penumbral External Contact	2029 July 11 at 16:45:20.1 UTC

July 11, 2029 Solar Eclipse Parameters
Parameter	Value
Eclipse Magnitude	0.23033
Eclipse Obscuration	0.12768
Gamma	−1.41908
Sun Right Ascension	07h24m55.6s
Sun Declination	+22°00'04.3"
Sun Semi-Diameter	15'43.9"
Sun Equatorial Horizontal Parallax	08.7"
Moon Right Ascension	07h23m33.7s
Moon Declination	+20°41'22.0"
Moon Semi-Diameter	15'35.3"
Moon Equatorial Horizontal Parallax	0°57'12.6"
ΔT	73.6 s

== Eclipse season ==
This eclipse is part of an eclipse season, a period, roughly every six months, when eclipses occur. Only two (or occasionally three) eclipse seasons occur each year, and each season lasts about 35 days and repeats just short of six months (173 days) later; thus two full eclipse seasons always occur each year. Either two or three eclipses happen each eclipse season. In the sequence below, each eclipse is separated by a fortnight. The first and last eclipse in this sequence is separated by one synodic month.

Eclipse season of June–July 2029
June 12 Descending node (new moon)	June 26 Ascending node (full moon)	July 11 Descending node (new moon)
Partial solar eclipse Solar Saros 118	Total lunar eclipse Lunar Saros 130	Partial solar eclipse Solar Saros 156

== Related eclipses ==
=== Eclipses in 2029 ===
- A partial solar eclipse on January 14.
- A partial solar eclipse on June 12.
- A total lunar eclipse on June 26.
- A partial solar eclipse on July 11.
- A partial solar eclipse on December 5.
- A total lunar eclipse on December 20.

=== Metonic ===
- Preceded by: Solar eclipse of September 21, 2025

=== Tzolkinex ===
- Followed by: Solar eclipse of August 21, 2036

=== Half-Saros ===
- Preceded by: Lunar eclipse of July 5, 2020
- Followed by: Lunar eclipse of July 16, 2038

=== Tritos ===
- Preceded by: Solar eclipse of August 11, 2018

=== Solar Saros 156 ===
- Preceded by: Solar eclipse of July 1, 2011
- Followed by: Solar eclipse of July 22, 2047

=== Inex ===
- Preceded by: Solar eclipse of July 31, 2000
- Followed by: Solar eclipse of June 21, 2058

=== Triad ===
- Preceded by: Solar eclipse of September 10, 1942

=== Solar eclipses of 2026–2029 ===
This eclipse is a member of a semester series. An eclipse in a semester series of solar eclipses repeats approximately every 177 days and 4 hours (a semester) at alternating nodes of the Moon's orbit.

The partial solar eclipses on June 12, 2029 and December 5, 2029 occur in the next lunar year eclipse set.

Solar eclipse series sets from 2026 to 2029
Ascending node			Descending node		
Saros	Map	Gamma	Saros	Map	Gamma
121	February 17, 2026 Annular	−0.97427	126	August 12, 2026 Total	0.89774
131	February 6, 2027 Annular	−0.29515	136	August 2, 2027 Total	0.14209
141	January 26, 2028 Annular	0.39014	146	July 22, 2028 Total	−0.60557
151	January 14, 2029 Partial	1.05532	156	July 11, 2029 Partial	−1.41908

=== Saros 156 ===
This eclipse is a part of Saros series 156, repeating every 18 years, 11 days, and containing 69 events. The series started with a partial solar eclipse on July 1, 2011. It contains annular eclipses from September 26, 2155 through April 7, 3075. There are no hybrid or total eclipses in this set. The series ends at member 69 as a partial eclipse on July 14, 3237. Its eclipses are tabulated in three columns; every third eclipse in the same column is one exeligmos apart, so they all cast shadows over approximately the same parts of the Earth.

The longest duration of annularity will be produced by member 29 at 8 minutes, 28 seconds on May 3, 2516. All eclipses in this series occur at the Moon’s descending node of orbit.

Series members 1–11 occur between 2011 and 2200:
1	2	3
July 1, 2011	July 11, 2029	July 22, 2047
4	5	6
August 2, 2065	August 13, 2083	August 24, 2101
7	8	9
September 5, 2119	September 15, 2137	September 26, 2155
10	11	
October 7, 2173	October 18, 2191	

=== Metonic series ===
The metonic series repeats eclipses every 19 years (6939.69 days), lasting about 5 cycles. Eclipses occur in nearly the same calendar date. In addition, the octon subseries repeats 1/5 of that or every 3.8 years (1387.94 days). All eclipses in this table occur at the Moon's descending node.

21 eclipse events between July 11, 1953 and July 11, 2029
July 10–11	April 29–30	February 15–16	December 4	September 21–23
116	118	120	122	124
July 11, 1953	April 30, 1957	February 15, 1961	December 4, 1964	September 22, 1968
126	128	130	132	134
July 10, 1972	April 29, 1976	February 16, 1980	December 4, 1983	September 23, 1987
136	138	140	142	144
July 11, 1991	April 29, 1995	February 16, 1999	December 4, 2002	September 22, 2006
146	148	150	152	154
July 11, 2010	April 29, 2014	February 15, 2018	December 4, 2021	September 21, 2025
156
July 11, 2029

=== Tritos series ===
This eclipse is a part of a tritos cycle, repeating at alternating nodes every 135 synodic months (≈ 3986.63 days, or 11 years minus 1 month). Their appearance and longitude are irregular due to a lack of synchronization with the anomalistic month (period of perigee), but groupings of 3 tritos cycles (≈ 33 years minus 3 months) come close (≈ 434.044 anomalistic months), so eclipses are similar in these groupings.

The partial solar eclipse on November 4, 2116 (part of Saros 164) is also a part of this series but is not included in the table below.

Series members between 1801 and 2029
March 24, 1811 (Saros 136)	February 21, 1822 (Saros 137)	January 20, 1833 (Saros 138)	December 21, 1843 (Saros 139)	November 20, 1854 (Saros 140)
October 19, 1865 (Saros 141)	September 17, 1876 (Saros 142)	August 19, 1887 (Saros 143)	July 18, 1898 (Saros 144)	June 17, 1909 (Saros 145)
May 18, 1920 (Saros 146)	April 18, 1931 (Saros 147)	March 16, 1942 (Saros 148)	February 14, 1953 (Saros 149)	January 14, 1964 (Saros 150)
December 13, 1974 (Saros 151)	November 12, 1985 (Saros 152)	October 12, 1996 (Saros 153)	September 11, 2007 (Saros 154)	August 11, 2018 (Saros 155)
July 11, 2029 (Saros 156)

=== Inex series ===
This eclipse is a part of the long period inex cycle, repeating at alternating nodes, every 358 synodic months (≈ 10,571.95 days, or 29 years minus 20 days). Their appearance and longitude are irregular due to a lack of synchronization with the anomalistic month (period of perigee). However, groupings of 3 inex cycles (≈ 87 years minus 2 months) comes close (≈ 1,151.02 anomalistic months), so eclipses are similar in these groupings.

Series members between 1801 and 2200
November 29, 1826 (Saros 149)	November 9, 1855 (Saros 150)	October 19, 1884 (Saros 151)
September 30, 1913 (Saros 152)	September 10, 1942 (Saros 153)	August 20, 1971 (Saros 154)
July 31, 2000 (Saros 155)	July 11, 2029 (Saros 156)	June 21, 2058 (Saros 157)
June 1, 2087 (Saros 158)		
April 1, 2174 (Saros 161)		
