= Solar eclipse of February 27, 2036 =

Future partial solar eclipse

- Partial eclipse
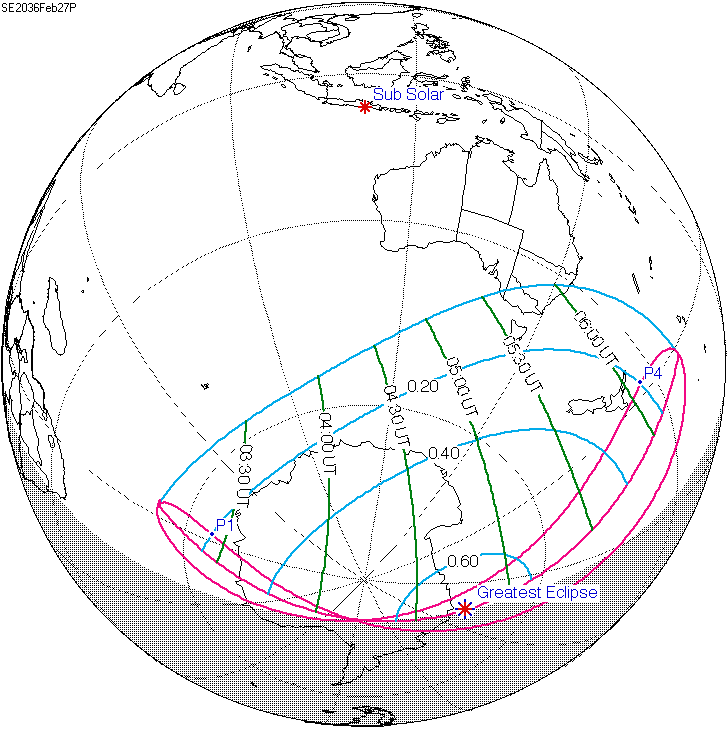
- Map
- Gamma: −1.1942
- Magnitude: 0.6286

Maximum eclipse
- Coordinates: 71.6°S 131.4°W

Times (UTC)
- Greatest eclipse: 4:46:49

References
- Saros: 150 (18 of 71)
- Catalog # (SE5000): 9587

A partial solar eclipse will occur at the Moon's descending node of orbit on Wednesday, February 27, 2036, with a magnitude of 0.6286. A solar eclipse occurs when the Moon passes between Earth and the Sun, thereby totally or partly obscuring the image of the Sun for a viewer on Earth. A partial solar eclipse occurs in the polar regions of the Earth when the center of the Moon's shadow misses the Earth.

A partial eclipse will be visible for parts of Antarctica, southeastern Australia, and New Zealand.

== Images ==
Animated path

== Eclipse timing ==
=== Places experiencing partial eclipse ===
Solar Eclipse of February 27, 2036 (Local Times)
Country or territory	City or place	Start of partial eclipse	Maximum eclipse	End of partial eclipse	Duration of eclipse (hr:min)	Maximum coverage
Antarctica	Mawson Station	07:52:05	08:37:09	09:23:51	1:32	11.41%
Antarctica	Davis Station	09:57:17	10:46:47	11:37:48	1:41	13.36%
Antarctica	Casey Station	11:16:18	12:13:47	13:11:29	1:55	16.37%
Antarctica	McMurdo Station	16:29:52	17:34:12	18:37:00	2:07	44.13%
Australia	Macquarie Island	15:14:29	16:18:21	17:17:47	2:03	26.70%
Australia	Hobart	15:47:36	16:34:50	17:19:00	1:31	7.20%
New Zealand	Dunedin	17:44:07	18:41:37	19:34:40	1:51	23.28%
Australia	Melbourne	16:14:46	16:43:44	17:11:24	0:57	1.52%
Australia	Traralgon	16:10:55	16:44:23	17:16:08	1:05	2.44%
Australia	Bendigo	16:23:34	16:45:23	17:06:26	0:43	0.64%
New Zealand	Chatham Islands	18:36:40	19:31:14	20:21:46 (sunset)	1:45	26.21%
New Zealand	Christchurch	17:51:34	18:46:44	19:37:39	1:46	21.40%
New Zealand	Wellington	17:58:39	18:51:19	19:40:01	1:41	19.47%
Australia	Wagga Wagga	16:30:31	16:51:46	17:12:17	0:42	0.64%
Australia	Canberra	16:26:24	16:52:51	17:18:09	0:52	1.29%
New Zealand	Palmerston North	18:01:33	18:53:07	19:40:50	1:39	18.60%
New Zealand	Napier	18:04:15	18:54:44	19:41:31	1:37	17.96%
Australia	Kiama	16:28:16	16:55:25	17:21:21	0:53	1.46%
Australia	Bowral	16:30:06	16:55:31	17:19:50	0:50	1.18%
Australia	Wollongong	16:29:50	16:55:57	17:20:56	0:51	1.30%
Australia	Canterbury	16:33:01	16:57:11	17:20:21	0:47	1.04%
Australia	Sydney	16:33:14	16:57:20	17:20:27	0:47	1.03%
New Zealand	Hamilton	18:09:31	18:57:47	19:42:34	1:33	15.10%
New Zealand	Tauranga	18:09:50	18:57:59	19:42:39	1:33	15.30%
Australia	Mudgee	16:49:32	16:58:48	17:07:55	0:18	0.06%
New Zealand	Auckland	18:12:34	18:59:27	19:43:00	1:30	13.68%
New Zealand	Whitianga	18:12:34	18:59:28	19:43:04	1:31	14.01%
Australia	Newcastle	16:39:14	16:59:38	17:19:19	0:40	0.64%
Australia	Lord Howe Island	16:38:47	17:06:04	17:32:05	0:53	1.86%
Norfolk Island	Kingston	17:45:17	18:12:32	18:38:30	0:53	2.32%

== Eclipse details ==
Shown below are two tables displaying details about this particular solar eclipse. The first table outlines times at which the Moon's penumbra or umbra attains the specific parameter, and the second table describes various other parameters pertaining to this eclipse.

February 27, 2036 Solar Eclipse Times
Event	Time (UTC)
First Penumbral External Contact	2036 February 27 at 02:48:35.8 UTC
Equatorial Conjunction	2036 February 27 at 04:06:00.3 UTC
Greatest Eclipse	2036 February 27 at 04:46:49.0 UTC
Ecliptic Conjunction	2036 February 27 at 05:00:28.4 UTC
Last Penumbral External Contact	2036 February 27 at 06:45:16.8 UTC

February 27, 2036 Solar Eclipse Parameters
Parameter	Value
Eclipse Magnitude	0.62863
Eclipse Obscuration	0.52439
Gamma	−1.19420
Sun Right Ascension	22h39m15.4s
Sun Declination	-08°30'21.2"
Sun Semi-Diameter	16'09.1"
Sun Equatorial Horizontal Parallax	08.9"
Moon Right Ascension	22h40m29.9s
Moon Declination	-09°33'05.6"
Moon Semi-Diameter	14'57.5"
Moon Equatorial Horizontal Parallax	0°54'53.9"
ΔT	76.7 s

== Eclipse season ==
This eclipse is part of an eclipse season, a period, roughly every six months, when eclipses occur. Only two (or occasionally three) eclipse seasons occur each year, and each season lasts about 35 days and repeats just short of six months (173 days) later; thus two full eclipse seasons always occur each year. Either two or three eclipses happen each eclipse season. In the sequence below, each eclipse is separated by a fortnight.

Eclipse season of February 2036
February 11 Ascending node (full moon)	February 27 Descending node (new moon)
Total lunar eclipse Lunar Saros 124	Partial solar eclipse Solar Saros 150

== Related eclipses ==
=== Eclipses in 2036 ===
- A total lunar eclipse on February 11.
- A partial solar eclipse on February 27.
- A partial solar eclipse on July 23.
- A total lunar eclipse on August 7.
- A partial solar eclipse on August 21.

=== Metonic ===
- Preceded by: Solar eclipse of May 9, 2032
- Followed by: Solar eclipse of December 15, 2039

=== Tzolkinex ===
- Preceded by: Solar eclipse of January 14, 2029
- Followed by: Solar eclipse of April 9, 2043

=== Half-Saros ===
- Preceded by: Lunar eclipse of February 20, 2027
- Followed by: Lunar eclipse of March 3, 2045

=== Tritos ===
- Preceded by: Solar eclipse of March 29, 2025
- Followed by: Solar eclipse of January 26, 2047

=== Solar Saros 150 ===
- Preceded by: Solar eclipse of February 15, 2018
- Followed by: Solar eclipse of March 9, 2054

=== Inex ===
- Preceded by: Solar eclipse of March 19, 2007
- Followed by: Solar eclipse of February 5, 2065

=== Triad ===
- Preceded by: Solar eclipse of April 28, 1949
- Followed by: Solar eclipse of December 28, 2122

=== Solar eclipses of 2033–2036 ===
This eclipse is a member of a semester series. An eclipse in a semester series of solar eclipses repeats approximately every 177 days and 4 hours (a semester) at alternating nodes of the Moon's orbit.

The partial solar eclipse on July 23, 2036 occurs in the next lunar year eclipse set.

Solar eclipse series sets from 2033 to 2036
Descending node			Ascending node		
Saros	Map	Gamma	Saros	Map	Gamma
120	March 30, 2033 Total	0.9778	125	September 23, 2033 Partial	−1.1583
130	March 20, 2034 Total	0.2894	135	September 12, 2034 Annular	−0.3936
140	March 9, 2035 Annular	−0.4368	145	September 2, 2035 Total	0.3727
150	February 27, 2036 Partial	−1.1942	155	August 21, 2036 Partial	1.0825

=== Saros 150 ===
This eclipse is a part of Saros series 150, repeating every 18 years, 11 days, and containing 71 events. The series started with a partial solar eclipse on August 24, 1729. It contains annular eclipses from April 22, 2126 through June 22, 2829. There are no hybrid or total eclipses in this set. The series ends at member 71 as a partial eclipse on September 29, 2991. Its eclipses are tabulated in three columns; every third eclipse in the same column is one exeligmos apart, so they all cast shadows over approximately the same parts of the Earth.

The longest duration of annularity will be produced by member 45 at 9 minutes, 58 seconds on December 19, 2522. All eclipses in this series occur at the Moon’s descending node of orbit.

Series members 5–27 occur between 1801 and 2200:
5	6	7
October 7, 1801	October 19, 1819	October 29, 1837
8	9	10
November 9, 1855	November 20, 1873	December 1, 1891
11	12	13
December 12, 1909	December 24, 1927	January 3, 1946
14	15	16
January 14, 1964	January 25, 1982	February 5, 2000
17	18	19
February 15, 2018	February 27, 2036	March 9, 2054
20	21	22
March 19, 2072	March 31, 2090	April 11, 2108
23	24	25
April 22, 2126	May 3, 2144	May 14, 2162
26	27	
May 24, 2180	June 4, 2198	

=== Metonic series ===
The metonic series repeats eclipses every 19 years (6939.69 days), lasting about 5 cycles. Eclipses occur in nearly the same calendar date. In addition, the octon subseries repeats 1/5 of that or every 3.8 years (1387.94 days). All eclipses in this table occur at the Moon's descending node.

21 eclipse events between July 22, 1971 and July 22, 2047
July 22	May 9–11	February 26–27	December 14–15	October 2–3
116	118	120	122	124
July 22, 1971	May 11, 1975	February 26, 1979	December 15, 1982	October 3, 1986
126	128	130	132	134
July 22, 1990	May 10, 1994	February 26, 1998	December 14, 2001	October 3, 2005
136	138	140	142	144
July 22, 2009	May 10, 2013	February 26, 2017	December 14, 2020	October 2, 2024
146	148	150	152	154
July 22, 2028	May 9, 2032	February 27, 2036	December 15, 2039	October 3, 2043
156
July 22, 2047

=== Tritos series ===
This eclipse is a part of a tritos cycle, repeating at alternating nodes every 135 synodic months (≈ 3986.63 days, or 11 years minus 1 month). Their appearance and longitude are irregular due to a lack of synchronization with the anomalistic month (period of perigee), but groupings of 3 tritos cycles (≈ 33 years minus 3 months) come close (≈ 434.044 anomalistic months), so eclipses are similar in these groupings.

The partial solar eclipses on December 18, 2188 (part of Saros 164) and November 18, 2199 (part of Saros 165) are also a part of this series but are not included in the table below.

Series members between 1801 and 2134
December 10, 1806 (Saros 129)	November 9, 1817 (Saros 130)	October 9, 1828 (Saros 131)	September 7, 1839 (Saros 132)	August 7, 1850 (Saros 133)
July 8, 1861 (Saros 134)	June 6, 1872 (Saros 135)	May 6, 1883 (Saros 136)	April 6, 1894 (Saros 137)	March 6, 1905 (Saros 138)
February 3, 1916 (Saros 139)	January 3, 1927 (Saros 140)	December 2, 1937 (Saros 141)	November 1, 1948 (Saros 142)	October 2, 1959 (Saros 143)
August 31, 1970 (Saros 144)	July 31, 1981 (Saros 145)	June 30, 1992 (Saros 146)	May 31, 2003 (Saros 147)	April 29, 2014 (Saros 148)
March 29, 2025 (Saros 149)	February 27, 2036 (Saros 150)	January 26, 2047 (Saros 151)	December 26, 2057 (Saros 152)	November 24, 2068 (Saros 153)
October 24, 2079 (Saros 154)	September 23, 2090 (Saros 155)	August 24, 2101 (Saros 156)	July 23, 2112 (Saros 157)	June 23, 2123 (Saros 158)
May 23, 2134 (Saros 159)

=== Inex series ===
This eclipse is a part of the long period inex cycle, repeating at alternating nodes, every 358 synodic months (≈ 10,571.95 days, or 29 years minus 20 days). Their appearance and longitude are irregular due to a lack of synchronization with the anomalistic month (period of perigee). However, groupings of 3 inex cycles (≈ 87 years minus 2 months) comes close (≈ 1,151.02 anomalistic months), so eclipses are similar in these groupings.

Series members between 1801 and 2200
August 5, 1804 (Saros 142)	July 17, 1833 (Saros 143)	June 27, 1862 (Saros 144)
June 6, 1891 (Saros 145)	May 18, 1920 (Saros 146)	April 28, 1949 (Saros 147)
April 7, 1978 (Saros 148)	March 19, 2007 (Saros 149)	February 27, 2036 (Saros 150)
February 5, 2065 (Saros 151)	January 16, 2094 (Saros 152)	December 28, 2122 (Saros 153)
December 8, 2151 (Saros 154)	November 17, 2180 (Saros 155)	
