= Solar eclipse of August 2, 2065 =

Future partial solar eclipse

- Partial eclipse
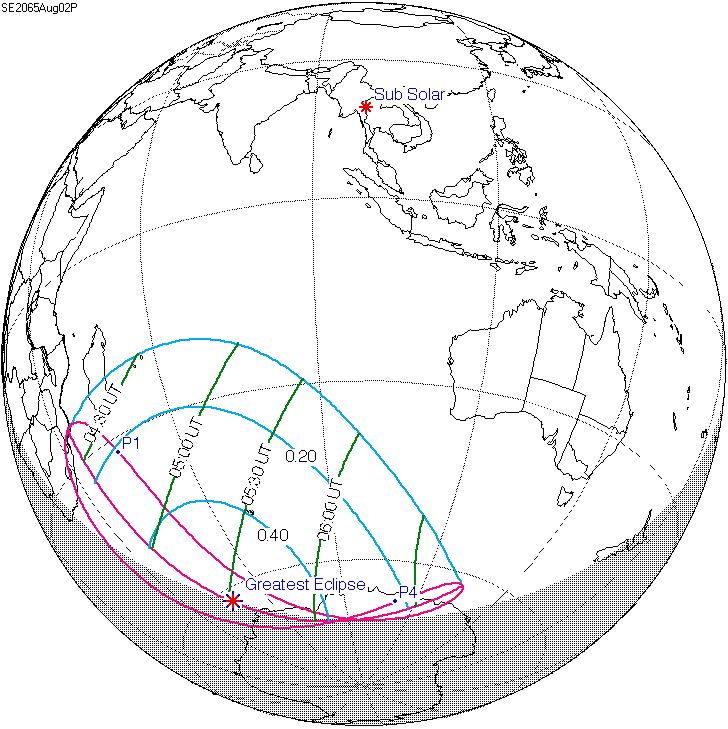
- Map
- Gamma: −1.2759
- Magnitude: 0.4903

Maximum eclipse
- Coordinates: 62.7°S 46.5°E

Times (UTC)
- Greatest eclipse: 5:34:17

References
- Saros: 156 (4 of 69)
- Catalog # (SE5000): 9653

A partial solar eclipse will occur at the Moon's descending node of orbit on Sunday, August 2, 2065, with a magnitude of 0.4903. A solar eclipse occurs when the Moon passes between Earth and the Sun, thereby totally or partly obscuring the image of the Sun for a viewer on Earth. A partial solar eclipse occurs in the polar regions of the Earth when the center of the Moon's shadow misses the Earth.

This will be the third of four partial solar eclipses in 2065, with the others occurring on February 5, July 3, and December 27.

The partial solar eclipse will be visible for parts of eastern South Africa, southern Madagascar, and Antarctica.

== Eclipse details ==
Shown below are two tables displaying details about this particular solar eclipse. The first table outlines times at which the Moon's penumbra or umbra attains the specific parameter, and the second table describes various other parameters pertaining to this eclipse.

August 2, 2065 Solar Eclipse Times
Event	Time (UTC)
First Penumbral External Contact	2065 August 2 at 03:55:46.2 UTC
Greatest Eclipse	2065 August 2 at 05:34:16.6 UTC
Ecliptic Conjunction	2065 August 2 at 05:47:56.2 UTC
Equatorial Conjunction	2065 August 2 at 06:29:36.9 UTC
Last Penumbral External Contact	2065 August 2 at 07:12:19.3 UTC

August 2, 2065 Solar Eclipse Parameters
Parameter	Value
Eclipse Magnitude	0.49029
Eclipse Obscuration	0.37827
Gamma	−1.27584
Sun Right Ascension	08h51m52.4s
Sun Declination	+17°35'43.5"
Sun Semi-Diameter	15'45.5"
Sun Equatorial Horizontal Parallax	08.7"
Moon Right Ascension	08h50m03.4s
Moon Declination	+16°28'16.4"
Moon Semi-Diameter	15'28.9"
Moon Equatorial Horizontal Parallax	0°56'49.3"
ΔT	94.3 s

== Eclipse season ==
This eclipse is part of an eclipse season, a period, roughly every six months, when eclipses occur. Only two (or occasionally three) eclipse seasons occur each year, and each season lasts about 35 days and repeats just short of six months (173 days) later; thus two full eclipse seasons always occur each year. Either two or three eclipses happen each eclipse season. In the sequence below, each eclipse is separated by a fortnight. The first and last eclipse in this sequence is separated by one synodic month.

Eclipse season of July–August 2065
July 3 Descending node (new moon)	July 17 Ascending node (full moon)	August 2 Descending node (new moon)
Partial solar eclipse Solar Saros 118	Total lunar eclipse Lunar Saros 130	Partial solar eclipse Solar Saros 156

== Related eclipses ==
=== Eclipses in 2065 ===
- A total lunar eclipse on January 22.
- A partial solar eclipse on February 5.
- A partial solar eclipse on July 3.
- A total lunar eclipse on July 17.
- A partial solar eclipse on August 2.
- A partial solar eclipse on December 27.

=== Metonic ===
- Preceded by: Solar eclipse of October 13, 2061
- Followed by: Solar eclipse of May 20, 2069

=== Tzolkinex ===
- Preceded by: Solar eclipse of June 21, 2058
- Followed by: Solar eclipse of September 12, 2072

=== Half-Saros ===
- Preceded by: Lunar eclipse of July 26, 2056
- Followed by: Lunar eclipse of August 7, 2074

=== Tritos ===
- Preceded by: Solar eclipse of September 2, 2054
- Followed by: Solar eclipse of July 1, 2076

=== Solar Saros 156 ===
- Preceded by: Solar eclipse of July 22, 2047
- Followed by: Solar eclipse of August 13, 2083

=== Inex ===
- Preceded by: Solar eclipse of August 21, 2036
- Followed by: Solar eclipse of July 12, 2094

=== Triad ===
- Preceded by: Solar eclipse of October 2, 1978
- Followed by: Solar eclipse of June 3, 2152

=== Solar eclipses of 2062–2065 ===
This eclipse is a member of a semester series. An eclipse in a semester series of solar eclipses repeats approximately every 177 days and 4 hours (a semester) at alternating nodes of the Moon's orbit.

The partial solar eclipses on July 3, 2065 and December 27, 2065 occur in the next lunar year eclipse set.

Solar eclipse series sets from 2062 to 2065
Ascending node			Descending node		
Saros	Map	Gamma	Saros	Map	Gamma
121	March 11, 2062 Partial	−1.0238	126	September 3, 2062 Partial	1.0191
131	February 28, 2063 Annular	−0.336	136	August 24, 2063 Total	0.2771
141	February 17, 2064 Annular	0.3597	146	August 12, 2064 Total	−0.4652
151	February 5, 2065 Partial	1.0336	156	August 2, 2065 Partial	−1.2759

=== Saros 156 ===
This eclipse is a part of Saros series 156, repeating every 18 years, 11 days, and containing 69 events. The series started with a partial solar eclipse on July 1, 2011. It contains annular eclipses from September 26, 2155 through April 7, 3075. There are no hybrid or total eclipses in this set. The series ends at member 69 as a partial eclipse on July 14, 3237. Its eclipses are tabulated in three columns; every third eclipse in the same column is one exeligmos apart, so they all cast shadows over approximately the same parts of the Earth.

The longest duration of annularity will be produced by member 29 at 8 minutes, 28 seconds on May 3, 2516. All eclipses in this series occur at the Moon’s descending node of orbit.

Series members 1–11 occur between 2011 and 2200:
1	2	3
July 1, 2011	July 11, 2029	July 22, 2047
4	5	6
August 2, 2065	August 13, 2083	August 24, 2101
7	8	9
September 5, 2119	September 15, 2137	September 26, 2155
10	11	
October 7, 2173	October 18, 2191	

=== Metonic series ===
The metonic series repeats eclipses every 19 years (6939.69 days), lasting about 5 cycles. Eclipses occur in nearly the same calendar date. In addition, the octon subseries repeats 1/5 of that or every 3.8 years (1387.94 days). All eclipses in this table occur at the Moon's descending node.

21 eclipse events between May 21, 1993 and May 20, 2069
May 20–21	March 9	December 25–26	October 13–14	August 1–2
118	120	122	124	126
May 21, 1993	March 9, 1997	December 25, 2000	October 14, 2004	August 1, 2008
128	130	132	134	136
May 20, 2012	March 9, 2016	December 26, 2019	October 14, 2023	August 2, 2027
138	140	142	144	146
May 21, 2031	March 9, 2035	December 26, 2038	October 14, 2042	August 2, 2046
148	150	152	154	156
May 20, 2050	March 9, 2054	December 26, 2057	October 13, 2061	August 2, 2065
158
May 20, 2069

=== Tritos series ===
This eclipse is a part of a tritos cycle, repeating at alternating nodes every 135 synodic months (≈ 3986.63 days, or 11 years minus 1 month). Their appearance and longitude are irregular due to a lack of synchronization with the anomalistic month (period of perigee), but groupings of 3 tritos cycles (≈ 33 years minus 3 months) come close (≈ 434.044 anomalistic months), so eclipses are similar in these groupings.

Series members between 1801 and 2087
August 17, 1803 (Saros 132)	July 17, 1814 (Saros 133)	June 16, 1825 (Saros 134)	May 15, 1836 (Saros 135)	April 15, 1847 (Saros 136)
March 15, 1858 (Saros 137)	February 11, 1869 (Saros 138)	January 11, 1880 (Saros 139)	December 12, 1890 (Saros 140)	November 11, 1901 (Saros 141)
October 10, 1912 (Saros 142)	September 10, 1923 (Saros 143)	August 10, 1934 (Saros 144)	July 9, 1945 (Saros 145)	June 8, 1956 (Saros 146)
May 9, 1967 (Saros 147)	April 7, 1978 (Saros 148)	March 7, 1989 (Saros 149)	February 5, 2000 (Saros 150)	January 4, 2011 (Saros 151)
December 4, 2021 (Saros 152)	November 3, 2032 (Saros 153)	October 3, 2043 (Saros 154)	September 2, 2054 (Saros 155)	August 2, 2065 (Saros 156)
July 1, 2076 (Saros 157)	June 1, 2087 (Saros 158)			

=== Inex series ===
This eclipse is a part of the long period inex cycle, repeating at alternating nodes, every 358 synodic months (≈ 10,571.95 days, or 29 years minus 20 days). Their appearance and longitude are irregular due to a lack of synchronization with the anomalistic month (period of perigee). However, groupings of 3 inex cycles (≈ 87 years minus 2 months) comes close (≈ 1,151.02 anomalistic months), so eclipses are similar in these groupings.

Series members between 1801 and 2200
January 30, 1805 (Saros 147)	January 9, 1834 (Saros 148)	December 21, 1862 (Saros 149)
December 1, 1891 (Saros 150)	November 10, 1920 (Saros 151)	October 21, 1949 (Saros 152)
October 2, 1978 (Saros 153)	September 11, 2007 (Saros 154)	August 21, 2036 (Saros 155)
August 2, 2065 (Saros 156)	July 12, 2094 (Saros 157)	June 23, 2123 (Saros 158)
June 3, 2152 (Saros 159)	May 13, 2181 (Saros 160)	
