= Solar eclipse of August 13, 2083 =

Future partial solar eclipse

- Partial eclipse
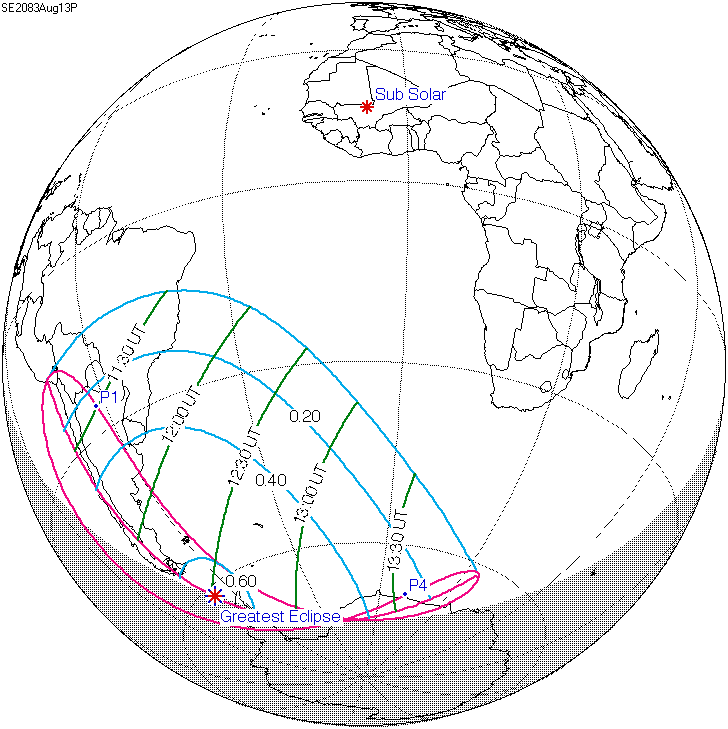
- Map
- Gamma: −1.2064
- Magnitude: 0.6146

Maximum eclipse
- Coordinates: 62.1°S 67.5°W

Times (UTC)
- Greatest eclipse: 12:34:41

References
- Saros: 156 (5 of 69)
- Catalog # (SE5000): 9694

A partial solar eclipse will occur at the Moon's descending node of orbit on Friday, August 13, 2083, with a magnitude of 0.6146. A solar eclipse occurs when the Moon passes between Earth and the Sun, thereby totally or partly obscuring the image of the Sun for a viewer on Earth. A partial solar eclipse occurs in the polar regions of the Earth when the center of the Moon's shadow misses the Earth.

The partial solar eclipse will be visible for parts of southern and central South America and Antarctica.

== Eclipse details ==
Shown below are two tables displaying details about this particular solar eclipse. The first table outlines times at which the Moon's penumbra or umbra attains the specific parameter, and the second table describes various other parameters pertaining to this eclipse.

August 13, 2083 Solar Eclipse Times
Event	Time (UTC)
First Penumbral External Contact	2083 August 13 at 10:45:02.9 UTC
Greatest Eclipse	2083 August 13 at 12:34:41.2 UTC
Ecliptic Conjunction	2083 August 13 at 12:47:43.2 UTC
Equatorial Conjunction	2083 August 13 at 13:35:18.6 UTC
Last Penumbral External Contact	2083 August 13 at 14:23:49.7 UTC

August 13, 2083 Solar Eclipse Parameters
Parameter	Value
Eclipse Magnitude	0.61464
Eclipse Obscuration	0.51798
Gamma	−1.20640
Sun Right Ascension	09h33m34.6s
Sun Declination	+14°29'20.4"
Sun Semi-Diameter	15'47.0"
Sun Equatorial Horizontal Parallax	08.7"
Moon Right Ascension	09h31m40.1s
Moon Declination	+13°27'06.6"
Moon Semi-Diameter	15'25.9"
Moon Equatorial Horizontal Parallax	0°56'37.9"
ΔT	108.5 s

== Eclipse season ==
This eclipse is part of an eclipse season, a period, roughly every six months, when eclipses occur. Only two (or occasionally three) eclipse seasons occur each year, and each season lasts about 35 days and repeats just short of six months (173 days) later; thus two full eclipse seasons always occur each year. Either two or three eclipses happen each eclipse season. In the sequence below, each eclipse is separated by a fortnight. The first and last eclipse in this sequence is separated by one synodic month.

Eclipse season of July–August 2083
July 15 Descending node (new moon)	July 29 Ascending node (full moon)	August 13 Descending node (new moon)
Partial solar eclipse Solar Saros 118	Total lunar eclipse Lunar Saros 130	Partial solar eclipse Solar Saros 156

== Related eclipses ==
=== Eclipses in 2083 ===
- A total lunar eclipse on February 2.
- A partial solar eclipse on February 16.
- A partial solar eclipse on July 15.
- A total lunar eclipse on July 29.
- A partial solar eclipse on August 13.

=== Metonic ===
- Preceded by: Solar eclipse of October 24, 2079
- Followed by: Solar eclipse of June 1, 2087

=== Tzolkinex ===
- Preceded by: Solar eclipse of July 1, 2076
- Followed by: Solar eclipse of September 23, 2090

=== Half-Saros ===
- Preceded by: Lunar eclipse of August 7, 2074
- Followed by: Lunar eclipse of August 17, 2092

=== Tritos ===
- Preceded by: Solar eclipse of September 12, 2072
- Followed by: Solar eclipse of July 12, 2094

=== Solar Saros 156 ===
- Preceded by: Solar eclipse of August 2, 2065
- Followed by: Solar eclipse of August 24, 2101

=== Inex ===
- Preceded by: Solar eclipse of September 2, 2054
- Followed by: Solar eclipse of July 23, 2112

=== Triad ===
- Preceded by: Solar eclipse of October 12, 1996
- Followed by: Solar eclipse of June 14, 2170

=== Solar eclipses 2080–2083 ===
This eclipse is a member of a semester series. An eclipse in a semester series of solar eclipses repeats approximately every 177 days and 4 hours (a semester) at alternating nodes of the Moon's orbit.

The partial solar eclipse on July 15, 2083 occurs in the next lunar year eclipse set.

Solar eclipse series sets from 2080 to 2083
Ascending node			Descending node		
Saros	Map	Gamma	Saros	Map	Gamma
121	March 21, 2080 Partial	−1.0578	126	September 13, 2080 Partial	1.0723
131	March 10, 2081 Annular	−0.3653	136	September 3, 2081 Total	0.3378
141	February 27, 2082 Annular	0.3361	146	August 24, 2082 Total	−0.4004
151	February 16, 2083 Partial	1.017	156	August 13, 2083 Partial	−1.2064

=== Saros 156 ===
This eclipse is a part of Saros series 156, repeating every 18 years, 11 days, and containing 69 events. The series started with a partial solar eclipse on July 1, 2011. It contains annular eclipses from September 26, 2155 through April 7, 3075. There are no hybrid or total eclipses in this set. The series ends at member 69 as a partial eclipse on July 14, 3237. Its eclipses are tabulated in three columns; every third eclipse in the same column is one exeligmos apart, so they all cast shadows over approximately the same parts of the Earth.

The longest duration of annularity will be produced by member 29 at 8 minutes, 28 seconds on May 3, 2516. All eclipses in this series occur at the Moon’s descending node of orbit.

Series members 1–11 occur between 2011 and 2200:
1	2	3
July 1, 2011	July 11, 2029	July 22, 2047
4	5	6
August 2, 2065	August 13, 2083	August 24, 2101
7	8	9
September 5, 2119	September 15, 2137	September 26, 2155
10	11	
October 7, 2173	October 18, 2191	

=== Metonic series ===
The metonic series repeats eclipses every 19 years (6939.69 days), lasting about 5 cycles. Eclipses occur in nearly the same calendar date. In addition, the octon subseries repeats 1/5 of that or every 3.8 years (1387.94 days). All eclipses in this table occur at the Moon's descending node.

22 eclipse events between June 1, 2011 and October 24, 2098
May 31–June 1	March 19–20	January 5–6	October 24–25	August 12–13
118	120	122	124	126
June 1, 2011	March 20, 2015	January 6, 2019	October 25, 2022	August 12, 2026
128	130	132	134	136
June 1, 2030	March 20, 2034	January 5, 2038	October 25, 2041	August 12, 2045
138	140	142	144	146
May 31, 2049	March 20, 2053	January 5, 2057	October 24, 2060	August 12, 2064
148	150	152	154	156
May 31, 2068	March 19, 2072	January 6, 2076	October 24, 2079	August 13, 2083
158	160	162	164	
June 1, 2087			October 24, 2098	

=== Tritos series ===
This eclipse is a part of a tritos cycle, repeating at alternating nodes every 135 synodic months (≈ 3986.63 days, or 11 years minus 1 month). Their appearance and longitude are irregular due to a lack of synchronization with the anomalistic month (period of perigee), but groupings of 3 tritos cycles (≈ 33 years minus 3 months) come close (≈ 434.044 anomalistic months), so eclipses are similar in these groupings.

The partial solar eclipses on December 7, 2170 (part of Saros 164) and November 7, 2181 (part of Saros 165) are also a part of this series but are not included in the table below.

Series members between 1801 and 2105
September 28, 1810 (Saros 131)	August 27, 1821 (Saros 132)	July 27, 1832 (Saros 133)	June 27, 1843 (Saros 134)	May 26, 1854 (Saros 135)
April 25, 1865 (Saros 136)	March 25, 1876 (Saros 137)	February 22, 1887 (Saros 138)	January 22, 1898 (Saros 139)	December 23, 1908 (Saros 140)
November 22, 1919 (Saros 141)	October 21, 1930 (Saros 142)	September 21, 1941 (Saros 143)	August 20, 1952 (Saros 144)	July 20, 1963 (Saros 145)
June 20, 1974 (Saros 146)	May 19, 1985 (Saros 147)	April 17, 1996 (Saros 148)	March 19, 2007 (Saros 149)	February 15, 2018 (Saros 150)
January 14, 2029 (Saros 151)	December 15, 2039 (Saros 152)	November 14, 2050 (Saros 153)	October 13, 2061 (Saros 154)	September 12, 2072 (Saros 155)
August 13, 2083 (Saros 156)	July 12, 2094 (Saros 157)	June 12, 2105 (Saros 158)		

=== Inex series ===
This eclipse is a part of the long period inex cycle, repeating at alternating nodes, every 358 synodic months (≈ 10,571.95 days, or 29 years minus 20 days). Their appearance and longitude are irregular due to a lack of synchronization with the anomalistic month (period of perigee). However, groupings of 3 inex cycles (≈ 87 years minus 2 months) comes close (≈ 1,151.02 anomalistic months), so eclipses are similar in these groupings.

Series members between 1801 and 2200
February 11, 1823 (Saros 147)	January 21, 1852 (Saros 148)	December 31, 1880 (Saros 149)
December 12, 1909 (Saros 150)	November 21, 1938 (Saros 151)	November 2, 1967 (Saros 152)
October 12, 1996 (Saros 153)	September 21, 2025 (Saros 154)	September 2, 2054 (Saros 155)
August 13, 2083 (Saros 156)	July 23, 2112 (Saros 157)	July 3, 2141 (Saros 158)
June 14, 2170 (Saros 159)	May 24, 2199 (Saros 160)	
