= Solar eclipse of July 1, 2011 =

21st-century partial solar eclipse

- Partial eclipse
- Map
- Gamma: −1.4917
- Magnitude: 0.0971

Maximum eclipse
- Coordinates: 65.2°S 28.6°E

Times (UTC)
- (P1) Partial begin: 7:53:47
- Greatest eclipse: 8:39:30
- (P4) Partial end: 9:22:45

References
- Saros: 156 (1 of 69)
- Catalog # (SE5000): 9533

A partial solar eclipse occurred at the Moon’s descending node of orbit on Friday, July 1, 2011, with a magnitude of 0.0971. A solar eclipse occurs when the Moon passes between Earth and the Sun, thereby totally or partly obscuring the image of the Sun for a viewer on Earth. A partial solar eclipse occurs in the polar regions of the Earth when the center of the Moon's shadow misses the Earth.

This eclipse was the third of four partial solar eclipses in 2011, with the others occurring on January 4, June 1 and November 25.

This is the first solar eclipse of Saros series 156, only visible as a partial solar eclipse in a small area south of South Africa and north of Antarctica. It is the first new saros series to begin since saros 155 began with the partial solar eclipse of June 17, 1928.

== Images ==
Animated path

== Eclipse details ==
Shown below are two tables displaying details about this particular solar eclipse. The first table outlines times at which the Moon's penumbra or umbra attains the specific parameter, and the second table describes various other parameters pertaining to this eclipse.

July 1, 2011 Solar Eclipse Times
| Event | Time (UTC) |
|---|---|
| First Penumbral External Contact | 2011 July 1 at 07:54:48.7 UTC |
| Greatest Eclipse | 2011 July 1 at 08:39:30.3 UTC |
| Ecliptic Conjunction | 2011 July 1 at 08:55:01.7 UTC |
| Equatorial Conjunction | 2011 July 1 at 09:06:38.7 UTC |
| Last Penumbral External Contact | 2011 July 1 at 09:23:55.6 UTC |

July 1, 2011 Solar Eclipse Parameters
| Parameter | Value |
|---|---|
| Eclipse Magnitude | 0.09710 |
| Eclipse Obscuration | 0.03573 |
| Gamma | −1.49171 |
| Sun Right Ascension | 06h40m01.7s |
| Sun Declination | +23°07'05.9" |
| Sun Semi-Diameter | 15'43.9" |
| Sun Equatorial Horizontal Parallax | 08.6" |
| Moon Right Ascension | 06h39m02.0s |
| Moon Declination | +21°42'47.5" |
| Moon Semi-Diameter | 15'38.6" |
| Moon Equatorial Horizontal Parallax | 0°57'24.6" |
| ΔT | 66.4 s |

== Eclipse season ==
This eclipse is part of an eclipse season, a period, roughly every six months, when eclipses occur. Only two (or occasionally three) eclipse seasons occur each year, and each season lasts about 35 days and repeats just short of six months (173 days) later; thus two full eclipse seasons always occur each year. Either two or three eclipses happen each eclipse season. In the sequence below, each eclipse is separated by a fortnight. The first and last eclipse in this sequence is separated by one synodic month.

Eclipse season of June–July 2011
| June 1 Descending node (new moon) | June 15 Ascending node (full moon) | July 1 Descending node (new moon) |
|---|---|---|
| Partial solar eclipse Solar Saros 118 | Total lunar eclipse Lunar Saros 130 | Partial solar eclipse Solar Saros 156 |

== Related eclipses ==
=== Eclipses in 2011 ===
- A partial solar eclipse on January 4.
- A partial solar eclipse on June 1.
- A total lunar eclipse on June 15.
- A partial solar eclipse on July 1.
- A partial solar eclipse on November 25.
- A total lunar eclipse on December 10.

=== Metonic ===
- Preceded by: Solar eclipse of September 11, 2007

=== Tzolkinex ===
- Followed by: Solar eclipse of August 11, 2018

=== Half-Saros ===
- Preceded by: Lunar eclipse of June 24, 2002
- Followed by: Lunar eclipse of July 5, 2020

=== Tritos ===
- Preceded by: Solar eclipse of July 31, 2000

=== Solar Saros 156 ===
- Followed by: Solar eclipse of July 11, 2029

=== Inex ===
- Preceded by: Solar eclipse of July 20, 1982

=== Triad ===
- Preceded by: Solar eclipse of August 30, 1924

=== Solar eclipses of 2008–2011 ===
This eclipse is a member of a semester series. An eclipse in a semester series of solar eclipses repeats approximately every 177 days and 4 hours (a semester) at alternating nodes of the Moon's orbit.

The partial solar eclipses on June 1, 2011 and November 25, 2011 occur in the next lunar year eclipse set.

Solar eclipse series sets from 2008 to 2011
| Ascending node | | | Descending node | | |
| Saros | Map | Gamma | Saros | Map | Gamma |
| 121 Partial in Christchurch, New Zealand | February 7, 2008 Annular | −0.95701 | 126 Totality in Kumul, Xinjiang, China | August 1, 2008 Total | 0.83070 |
| 131 Annularity in Palangka Raya, Indonesia | January 26, 2009 Annular | −0.28197 | 136 Totality in Kurigram District, Bangladesh | July 22, 2009 Total | 0.06977 |
| 141 Annularity in Jinan, Shandong, China | January 15, 2010 Annular | 0.40016 | 146 Totality in Hao, French Polynesia | July 11, 2010 Total | −0.67877 |
| 151 Partial in Poland | January 4, 2011 Partial | 1.06265 | 156 | July 1, 2011 Partial | −1.49171 |

=== Saros 156 ===
This eclipse is a part of Saros series 156, repeating every 18 years, 11 days, and containing 69 events. The series started with a partial solar eclipse on July 1, 2011. It contains annular eclipses from September 26, 2155 through April 7, 3075. There are no hybrid or total eclipses in this set. The series ends at member 69 as a partial eclipse on July 14, 3237. Its eclipses are tabulated in three columns; every third eclipse in the same column is one exeligmos apart, so they all cast shadows over approximately the same parts of the Earth.

The longest duration of annularity will be produced by member 29 at 8 minutes, 28 seconds on May 3, 2516. All eclipses in this series occur at the Moon’s descending node of orbit.

Series members 1–11 occur between 2011 and 2200:
| 1 | 2 | 3 |
|---|---|---|
| July 1, 2011 | July 11, 2029 | July 22, 2047 |
| 4 | 5 | 6 |
| August 2, 2065 | August 13, 2083 | August 24, 2101 |
| 7 | 8 | 9 |
| September 5, 2119 | September 15, 2137 | September 26, 2155 |
| 10 | 11 | |
| October 7, 2173 | October 18, 2191 | |

=== Metonic series ===
The metonic series repeats eclipses every 19 years (6939.69 days), lasting about 5 cycles. Eclipses occur in nearly the same calendar date. In addition, the octon subseries repeats 1/5 of that or every 3.8 years (1387.94 days). All eclipses in this table occur at the Moon's descending node.

22 eclipse events between September 12, 1931 and July 1, 2011
| September 11–12 | June 30–July 1 | April 17–19 | February 4–5 | November 22–23 |
| 114 | 116 | 118 | 120 | 122 |
|---|---|---|---|---|
| September 12, 1931 | June 30, 1935 | April 19, 1939 | February 4, 1943 | November 23, 1946 |
| 124 | 126 | 128 | 130 | 132 |
| September 12, 1950 | June 30, 1954 | April 19, 1958 | February 5, 1962 | November 23, 1965 |
| 134 | 136 | 138 | 140 | 142 |
| September 11, 1969 | June 30, 1973 | April 18, 1977 | February 4, 1981 | November 22, 1984 |
| 144 | 146 | 148 | 150 | 152 |
| September 11, 1988 | June 30, 1992 | April 17, 1996 | February 5, 2000 | November 23, 2003 |
| 154 | 156 | | | |
| September 11, 2007 | July 1, 2011 | | | |

=== Tritos series ===
This eclipse is a part of a tritos cycle, repeating at alternating nodes every 135 synodic months (≈ 3986.63 days, or 11 years minus 1 month). Their appearance and longitude are irregular due to a lack of synchronization with the anomalistic month (period of perigee), but groupings of 3 tritos cycles (≈ 33 years minus 3 months) come close (≈ 434.044 anomalistic months), so eclipses are similar in these groupings.

The partial solar eclipse on October 24, 2098 (part of Saros 164) is also a part of this series but is not included in the table below.

Series members between 1801 and 2011
| February 11, 1804 (Saros 137) | January 10, 1815 (Saros 138) | December 9, 1825 (Saros 139) | November 9, 1836 (Saros 140) | October 9, 1847 (Saros 141) |
| September 7, 1858 (Saros 142) | August 7, 1869 (Saros 143) | July 7, 1880 (Saros 144) | June 6, 1891 (Saros 145) | May 7, 1902 (Saros 146) |
| April 6, 1913 (Saros 147) | March 5, 1924 (Saros 148) | February 3, 1935 (Saros 149) | January 3, 1946 (Saros 150) | December 2, 1956 (Saros 151) |
| November 2, 1967 (Saros 152) | October 2, 1978 (Saros 153) | August 31, 1989 (Saros 154) | July 31, 2000 (Saros 155) | July 1, 2011 (Saros 156) |

=== Inex series ===
This eclipse is a part of the long period inex cycle, repeating at alternating nodes, every 358 synodic months (≈ 10,571.95 days, or 29 years minus 20 days). Their appearance and longitude are irregular due to a lack of synchronization with the anomalistic month (period of perigee). However, groupings of 3 inex cycles (≈ 87 years minus 2 months) comes close (≈ 1,151.02 anomalistic months), so eclipses are similar in these groupings.

Series members between 1801 and 2069
| November 18, 1808 (Saros 149) | October 29, 1837 (Saros 150) | October 8, 1866 (Saros 151) |
| September 18, 1895 (Saros 152) | August 30, 1924 (Saros 153) | August 9, 1953 (Saros 154) |
| July 20, 1982 (Saros 155) | July 1, 2011 (Saros 156) | |
| May 20, 2069 (Saros 158) | | |
