= Solar eclipse of January 26, 2047 =

Future partial solar eclipse

- Partial eclipse
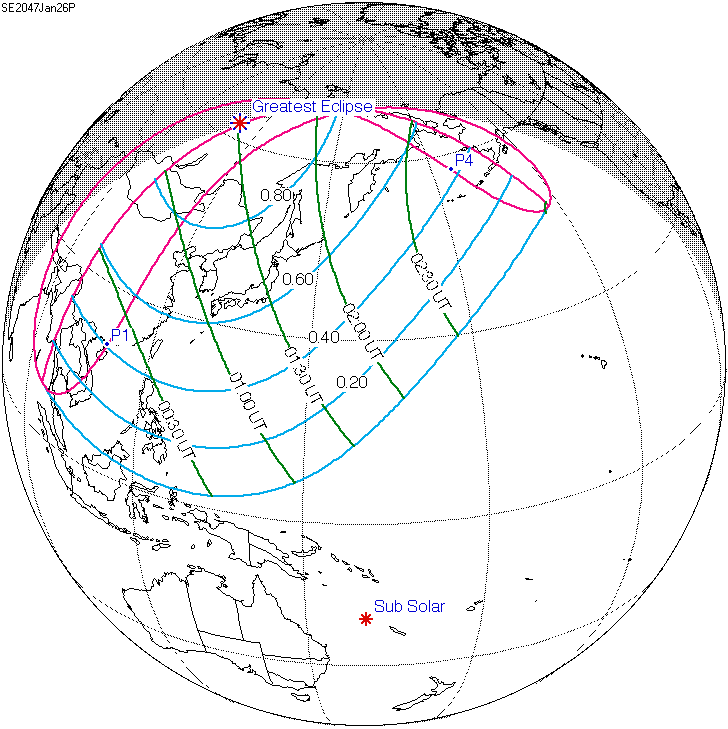
- Map
- Gamma: 1.045
- Magnitude: 0.8907

Maximum eclipse
- Coordinates: 62.9°N 111.7°E

Times (UTC)
- Greatest eclipse: 1:33:18

References
- Saros: 151 (16 of 72)
- Catalog # (SE5000): 9611

A partial solar eclipse will occur at the Moon's ascending node of orbit between Friday, January 25 and Saturday, January 26, 2047, with a magnitude of 0.8907. A solar eclipse occurs when the Moon passes between Earth and the Sun, thereby totally or partly obscuring the image of the Sun for a viewer on Earth. A partial solar eclipse occurs in the polar regions of the Earth when the center of the Moon's shadow misses the Earth.

This will be the first of four partial solar eclipses in 2047, with the others occurring on June 23, July 22, and December 16.

The partial solar eclipse will be visible for parts of East Asia, Southeast Asia, and southwestern Alaska.

== Images ==
Animated path

== Eclipse timing ==
=== Places experiencing partial eclipse ===
Solar Eclipse of January 26, 2047 (Local Times)
Country or territory	City or place	Start of partial eclipse	Maximum eclipse	End of partial eclipse	Duration of eclipse (hr:min)	Maximum coverage
Cambodia	Phnom Penh	06:30:17	07:07:31	07:47:51	1:18	6.54%
Thailand	Bangkok	06:45:46 (sunrise)	07:07:34	07:48:53	1:03	7.93%
Myanmar	Yangon	06:37:34 (sunrise)	06:39:59	07:23:27	0:46	10.93%
Laos	Vientiane	06:43:29 (sunrise)	07:12:30	08:06:54	1:23	17.48%
Vietnam	Hanoi	06:35:10 (sunrise)	07:17:44	08:21:16	1:46	26.19%
Philippines	Manila	07:25:17	08:24:21	09:30:52	2:06	19.00%
Macau	Macau	07:21:24	08:25:29	09:38:35	2:17	33.00%
Hong Kong	Hong Kong	07:21:34	08:26:16	09:40:09	2:19	33.52%
India	Dibrugarh	05:59:23 (sunrise)	06:02:01	06:52:20	0:53	30.21%
India	Sibsagar	05:59:38 (sunrise)	06:02:15	06:50:45	0:51	28.57%
India	Tinsukia	06:01:36 (sunrise)	06:04:14	06:51:43	0:50	28.80%
Palau	Ngerulmud	08:49:52	09:36:11	10:25:51	1:36	5.49%
India	Itanagar	06:03:54 (sunrise)	06:06:32	06:49:50	0:46	25.94%
Taiwan	Taipei	07:26:12	08:39:15	10:02:33	2:36	41.52%
Bangladesh	Dhaka	06:41:09 (sunrise)	06:44:36	07:07:19	0:26	10.43%
China	Shanghai	07:31:39	08:48:52	10:16:22	2:45	53.70%
India	Kolkata	06:17:34 (sunrise)	06:20:06	06:31:54	0:14	4.06%
Bhutan	Thimphu	06:50:26 (sunrise)	06:53:04	07:16:23	0:26	12.67%
China	Beijing	07:39:49	08:56:38	10:22:44	2:43	67.72%
Mongolia	Ulaanbaatar	08:27:29 (sunrise)	09:01:10	10:21:25	1:54	75.70%
Guam	Hagåtña	10:03:36	11:03:45	12:06:30	2:03	9.92%
Russia	Irkutsk	08:53:11 (sunrise)	09:07:12	10:25:30	1:32	79.03%
South Korea	Seoul	08:45:10	10:07:56	11:39:05	2:54	63.52%
North Korea	Pyongyang	08:46:05	10:08:23	11:38:59	2:53	65.95%
Japan	Tokyo	09:00:46	10:28:17	11:59:43	2:59	52.90%
Russia	Yakutsk	09:28:58	10:46:37	12:06:36	2:38	81.09%
Russia	Magadan	11:47:45	13:07:51	14:26:56	2:39	67.76%
Russia	Anadyr	13:20:34	14:31:02	15:29:56 (sunset)	2:09	50.10%
United States	Adak (Note: The times listed for this location occur on January 25, 2047, local time.)	15:40:10	16:42:52	17:41:51	2:02	24.62%
United States	Unalaska	16:54:21	17:49:20	18:34:19 (sunset)	1:40	18.90%

== Eclipse details ==
Shown below are two tables displaying details about this particular solar eclipse. The first table outlines times at which the Moon's penumbra or umbra attains the specific parameter, and the second table describes various other parameters pertaining to this eclipse.

January 26, 2047 Solar Eclipse Times
Event	Time (UTC)
First Penumbral External Contact	2047 January 25 at 23:22:09.4 UTC
Greatest Eclipse	2047 January 26 at 01:33:17.8 UTC
Ecliptic Conjunction	2047 January 26 at 01:45:01.5 UTC
Equatorial Conjunction	2047 January 26 at 02:16:13.7 UTC
Last Penumbral External Contact	2047 January 26 at 03:44:14.3 UTC

January 26, 2047 Solar Eclipse Parameters
Parameter	Value
Eclipse Magnitude	0.89077
Eclipse Obscuration	0.84044
Gamma	1.04496
Sun Right Ascension	20h33m28.4s
Sun Declination	-18°46'10.9"
Sun Semi-Diameter	16'14.7"
Sun Equatorial Horizontal Parallax	08.9"
Moon Right Ascension	20h32m04.0s
Moon Declination	-17°50'50.8"
Moon Semi-Diameter	15'23.2"
Moon Equatorial Horizontal Parallax	0°56'28.0"
ΔT	82.4 s

== Eclipse season ==
This eclipse is part of an eclipse season, a period, roughly every six months, when eclipses occur. Only two (or occasionally three) eclipse seasons occur each year, and each season lasts about 35 days and repeats just short of six months (173 days) later; thus two full eclipse seasons always occur each year. Either two or three eclipses happen each eclipse season. In the sequence below, each eclipse is separated by a fortnight.

Eclipse season of January 2047
January 12 Descending node (full moon)	January 26 Ascending node (new moon)
Total lunar eclipse Lunar Saros 125	Partial solar eclipse Solar Saros 151

== Related eclipses ==
=== Eclipses in 2047 ===
- A total lunar eclipse on January 12.
- A partial solar eclipse on January 26.
- A partial solar eclipse on June 23.
- A total lunar eclipse on July 7.
- A partial solar eclipse on July 22.
- A partial solar eclipse on December 16.

=== Metonic ===
- Preceded by: Solar eclipse of April 9, 2043
- Followed by: Solar eclipse of November 14, 2050

=== Tzolkinex ===
- Preceded by: Solar eclipse of December 15, 2039
- Followed by: Solar eclipse of March 9, 2054

=== Half-Saros ===
- Preceded by: Lunar eclipse of January 21, 2038
- Followed by: Lunar eclipse of February 1, 2056

=== Tritos ===
- Preceded by: Solar eclipse of February 27, 2036
- Followed by: Solar eclipse of December 26, 2057

=== Solar Saros 151 ===
- Preceded by: Solar eclipse of January 14, 2029
- Followed by: Solar eclipse of February 5, 2065

=== Inex ===
- Preceded by: Solar eclipse of February 15, 2018
- Followed by: Solar eclipse of January 6, 2076

=== Triad ===
- Preceded by: Solar eclipse of March 27, 1960
- Followed by: Solar eclipse of November 26, 2133

=== Solar eclipses of 2044–2047 ===
This eclipse is a member of a semester series. An eclipse in a semester series of solar eclipses repeats approximately every 177 days and 4 hours (a semester) at alternating nodes of the Moon's orbit.

The partial solar eclipses on June 23, 2047 and December 16, 2047 occur in the next lunar year eclipse set.

Solar eclipse series sets from 2044 to 2047
Ascending node			Descending node		
Saros	Map	Gamma	Saros	Map	Gamma
121	February 28, 2044 Annular	−0.9954	126	August 23, 2044 Total	0.9613
131	February 16, 2045 Annular	−0.3125	136	August 12, 2045 Total	0.2116
141	February 5, 2046 Annular	0.3765	146	August 2, 2046 Total	−0.535
151	January 26, 2047 Partial	1.045	156	July 22, 2047 Partial	−1.3477

=== Saros 151 ===
This eclipse is a part of Saros series 151, repeating every 18 years, 11 days, and containing 72 events. The series started with a partial solar eclipse on August 14, 1776. It contains annular eclipses from February 28, 2101 through April 23, 2191; a hybrid eclipse on May 5, 2209; and total eclipses from May 16, 2227 through July 6, 2912. The series ends at member 72 as a partial eclipse on October 1, 3056. Its eclipses are tabulated in three columns; every third eclipse in the same column is one exeligmos apart, so they all cast shadows over approximately the same parts of the Earth.

The longest duration of annularity will be produced by member 19 at 2 minutes, 44 seconds on February 28, 2101, and the longest duration of totality will be produced by member 60 at 5 minutes, 41 seconds on May 22, 2840. All eclipses in this series occur at the Moon’s ascending node of orbit.

Series members 3–24 occur between 1801 and 2200:
3	4	5
September 5, 1812	September 17, 1830	September 27, 1848
6	7	8
October 8, 1866	October 19, 1884	October 31, 1902
9	10	11
November 10, 1920	November 21, 1938	December 2, 1956
12	13	14
December 13, 1974	December 24, 1992	January 4, 2011
15	16	17
January 14, 2029	January 26, 2047	February 5, 2065
18	19	20
February 16, 2083	February 28, 2101	March 11, 2119
21	22	23
March 21, 2137	April 2, 2155	April 12, 2173
24
April 23, 2191

=== Metonic series ===
The metonic series repeats eclipses every 19 years (6939.69 days), lasting about 5 cycles. Eclipses occur in nearly the same calendar date. In addition, the octon subseries repeats 1/5 of that or every 3.8 years (1387.94 days). All eclipses in this table occur at the Moon's ascending node.

21 eclipse events between June 21, 1982 and June 21, 2058
June 21	April 8–9	January 26	November 13–14	September 1–2
117	119	121	123	125
June 21, 1982	April 9, 1986	January 26, 1990	November 13, 1993	September 2, 1997
127	129	131	133	135
June 21, 2001	April 8, 2005	January 26, 2009	November 13, 2012	September 1, 2016
137	139	141	143	145
June 21, 2020	April 8, 2024	January 26, 2028	November 14, 2031	September 2, 2035
147	149	151	153	155
June 21, 2039	April 9, 2043	January 26, 2047	November 14, 2050	September 2, 2054
157
June 21, 2058

=== Tritos series ===
This eclipse is a part of a tritos cycle, repeating at alternating nodes every 135 synodic months (≈ 3986.63 days, or 11 years minus 1 month). Their appearance and longitude are irregular due to a lack of synchronization with the anomalistic month (period of perigee), but groupings of 3 tritos cycles (≈ 33 years minus 3 months) come close (≈ 434.044 anomalistic months), so eclipses are similar in these groupings.

The partial solar eclipses on December 18, 2188 (part of Saros 164) and November 18, 2199 (part of Saros 165) are also a part of this series but are not included in the table below.

Series members between 1801 and 2134
December 10, 1806 (Saros 129)	November 9, 1817 (Saros 130)	October 9, 1828 (Saros 131)	September 7, 1839 (Saros 132)	August 7, 1850 (Saros 133)
July 8, 1861 (Saros 134)	June 6, 1872 (Saros 135)	May 6, 1883 (Saros 136)	April 6, 1894 (Saros 137)	March 6, 1905 (Saros 138)
February 3, 1916 (Saros 139)	January 3, 1927 (Saros 140)	December 2, 1937 (Saros 141)	November 1, 1948 (Saros 142)	October 2, 1959 (Saros 143)
August 31, 1970 (Saros 144)	July 31, 1981 (Saros 145)	June 30, 1992 (Saros 146)	May 31, 2003 (Saros 147)	April 29, 2014 (Saros 148)
March 29, 2025 (Saros 149)	February 27, 2036 (Saros 150)	January 26, 2047 (Saros 151)	December 26, 2057 (Saros 152)	November 24, 2068 (Saros 153)
October 24, 2079 (Saros 154)	September 23, 2090 (Saros 155)	August 24, 2101 (Saros 156)	July 23, 2112 (Saros 157)	June 23, 2123 (Saros 158)
May 23, 2134 (Saros 159)

=== Inex series ===
This eclipse is a part of the long period inex cycle, repeating at alternating nodes, every 358 synodic months (≈ 10,571.95 days, or 29 years minus 20 days). Their appearance and longitude are irregular due to a lack of synchronization with the anomalistic month (period of perigee). However, groupings of 3 inex cycles (≈ 87 years minus 2 months) comes close (≈ 1,151.02 anomalistic months), so eclipses are similar in these groupings.

Series members between 1801 and 2200
July 6, 1815 (Saros 143)	June 16, 1844 (Saros 144)	May 26, 1873 (Saros 145)
May 7, 1902 (Saros 146)	April 18, 1931 (Saros 147)	March 27, 1960 (Saros 148)
March 7, 1989 (Saros 149)	February 15, 2018 (Saros 150)	January 26, 2047 (Saros 151)
January 6, 2076 (Saros 152)	December 17, 2104 (Saros 153)	November 26, 2133 (Saros 154)
November 7, 2162 (Saros 155)	October 18, 2191 (Saros 156)	
