= Solar eclipse of June 23, 2047 =

Future partial solar eclipse

- Partial eclipse
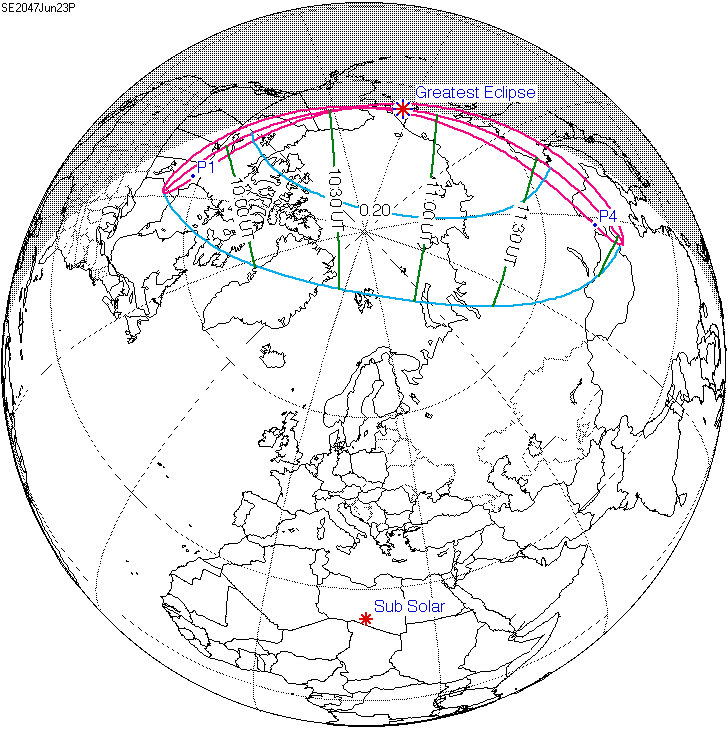
- Map
- Gamma: 1.3766
- Magnitude: 0.3129

Maximum eclipse
- Coordinates: 65.8°N 178°W

Times (UTC)
- Greatest eclipse: 10:52:31

References
- Saros: 118 (70 of 72)
- Catalog # (SE5000): 9612

A partial solar eclipse will occur at the Moon's descending node of orbit on Sunday, June 23, 2047, with a magnitude of 0.3129. A solar eclipse occurs when the Moon passes between Earth and the Sun, thereby totally or partly obscuring the image of the Sun for a viewer on Earth. A partial solar eclipse occurs in the polar regions of the Earth when the center of the Moon's shadow misses the Earth.

This will be the second of four partial solar eclipses in 2047, with the others occurring on January 26, July 22, and December 16.

The partial solar eclipse will be visible for parts of northern Canada, northern Alaska, northern Greenland, and Northeast Asia.

== Images ==
Animated path

== Eclipse timing ==
=== Places experiencing partial eclipse ===
Solar Eclipse of June 23, 2047 (Local Times)
Country or territory	City or place	Start of partial eclipse	Maximum eclipse	End of partial eclipse	Duration of eclipse (hr:min)	Maximum coverage
Canada	Coral Harbour	04:31:49	04:49:59	05:08:24	0:37	1.30%
Canada	Baker Lake	04:29:51	04:55:51	05:22:19	0:52	4.41%
Canada	Pond Inlet	05:38:31	06:03:41	06:29:13	0:51	3.07%
Canada	Yellowknife	03:40:27 (sunrise)	04:04:23	04:35:42	0:55	8.83%
Greenland	Pituffik	06:45:09	07:10:26	07:36:01	0:51	2.82%
Canada	Resolute	04:39:18	05:11:06	05:43:21	1:04	6.99%
Canada	Grise Fiord	05:41:58	06:11:37	06:41:40	1:00	5.09%
Greenland	Qaanaaq	08:45:59	09:12:25	09:39:09	0:53	3.23%
Canada	Eureka	04:46:53	05:18:57	05:51:22	1:04	6.34%
Canada	Inuvik	03:44:59	04:21:32	04:58:25	1:13	14.87%
Canada	Alert	05:53:48	06:23:15	06:52:57	0:59	4.31%
United States	Nuiqsut	01:54:22	02:32:56	03:11:37	1:17	17.61%
United States	Point Hope	02:03:42	02:42:50	03:21:52	1:18	19.30%
Russia	Anadyr	22:16:05	22:46:44	23:02:52 (sunset)	0:47	18.18%
Russia	Pevek	22:16:39	22:56:34	23:36:07	1:19	19.02%
United States	Fairbanks	02:59:00 (sunrise)	03:02:53	03:06:33	0:08	1.19%
Russia	Srednekolymsk	21:28:53	22:08:12	22:46:52	1:18	17.52%
Russia	Magadan	21:41:24	22:12:51	22:19:50 (sunset)	0:38	15.34%
Russia	Tiksi	19:35:35	20:13:42	20:51:04	1:15	12.49%
Russia	Verkhoyansk	20:40:33	21:18:26	21:55:30	1:15	13.49%
Russia	Khatanga	17:45:51	18:18:39	18:50:45	1:05	6.22%
Russia	Norilsk	18:00:23	18:24:33	18:48:16	0:48	2.13%
Russia	Yakutsk	19:52:47	20:28:20	21:03:00	1:10	11.57%
China	Qiqihar	19:29:15	19:40:50	19:44:41 (sunset)	0:15	2.05%
China	Mohe	19:17:19	19:45:15	20:12:30	0:55	5.70%
Russia	Chita	20:29:29	20:51:50	21:13:40	0:44	2.61%
China	Hulunbuir	19:29:35	19:52:07	20:10:15 (sunset)	0:41	2.99%
Russia	Irkutsk	19:42:16	19:55:49	20:09:08	0:27	0.51%
Mongolia	Choibalsan	19:40:07	19:56:58	20:13:32	0:33	1.18%

== Eclipse details ==
Shown below are two tables displaying details about this particular solar eclipse. The first table outlines times at which the Moon's penumbra or umbra attains the specific parameter, and the second table describes various other parameters pertaining to this eclipse.

June 23, 2047 Solar Eclipse Times
Event	Time (UTC)
First Penumbral External Contact	2047 June 23 at 09:29:32.0 UTC
Equatorial Conjunction	2047 June 23 at 10:34:45.0 UTC
Ecliptic Conjunction	2047 June 23 at 10:37:04.7 UTC
Greatest Eclipse	2047 June 23 at 10:52:30.6 UTC
Last Penumbral External Contact	2047 June 23 at 12:15:32.3 UTC

June 23, 2047 Solar Eclipse Parameters
Parameter	Value
Eclipse Magnitude	0.31293
Eclipse Obscuration	0.19776
Gamma	1.37663
Sun Right Ascension	06h08m27.7s
Sun Declination	+23°25'10.2"
Sun Semi-Diameter	15'44.2"
Sun Equatorial Horizontal Parallax	08.7"
Moon Right Ascension	06h09m05.2s
Moon Declination	+24°40'56.6"
Moon Semi-Diameter	15'07.9"
Moon Equatorial Horizontal Parallax	0°55'32.1"
ΔT	82.6 s

== Eclipse season ==
This eclipse is part of an eclipse season, a period, roughly every six months, when eclipses occur. Only two (or occasionally three) eclipse seasons occur each year, and each season lasts about 35 days and repeats just short of six months (173 days) later; thus two full eclipse seasons always occur each year. Either two or three eclipses happen each eclipse season. In the sequence below, each eclipse is separated by a fortnight. The first and last eclipse in this sequence is separated by one synodic month.

Eclipse season of June–July 2047
June 23 Descending node (new moon)	July 7 Ascending node (full moon)	July 22 Descending node (new moon)
Partial solar eclipse Solar Saros 118	Total lunar eclipse Lunar Saros 130	Partial solar eclipse Solar Saros 156

== Related eclipses ==
=== Eclipses in 2047 ===
- A total lunar eclipse on January 12.
- A partial solar eclipse on January 26.
- A partial solar eclipse on June 23.
- A total lunar eclipse on July 7.
- A partial solar eclipse on July 22.
- A partial solar eclipse on December 16.

=== Metonic ===
- Followed by: Solar eclipse of April 11, 2051

=== Tzolkinex ===
- Preceded by: Solar eclipse of May 11, 2040
- Followed by: Solar eclipse of August 3, 2054

=== Half-Saros ===
- Preceded by: Lunar eclipse of June 17, 2038
- Followed by: Lunar eclipse of June 27, 2056

=== Tritos ===
- Preceded by: Solar eclipse of July 23, 2036
- Followed by: Solar eclipse of May 22, 2058

=== Solar Saros 118 ===
- Preceded by: Solar eclipse of June 12, 2029
- Followed by: Solar eclipse of July 3, 2065

=== Inex ===
- Preceded by: Solar eclipse of July 13, 2018
- Followed by: Solar eclipse of June 1, 2076

=== Triad ===
- Followed by: Solar eclipse of April 24, 2134

=== Solar eclipses of 2047–2050 ===
This eclipse is a member of a semester series. An eclipse in a semester series of solar eclipses repeats approximately every 177 days and 4 hours (a semester) at alternating nodes of the Moon's orbit.

The partial solar eclipses on January 26, 2047 and July 22, 2047 occur in the previous lunar year eclipse set.

Solar eclipse series sets from 2047 to 2050
Descending node			Ascending node		
Saros	Map	Gamma	Saros	Map	Gamma
118	June 23, 2047 Partial	1.3766	123	December 16, 2047 Partial	−1.0661
128	June 11, 2048 Annular	0.6468	133	December 5, 2048 Total	−0.3973
138	May 31, 2049 Annular	−0.1187	143	November 25, 2049 Hybrid	0.2943
148	May 20, 2050 Hybrid	−0.8688	153	November 14, 2050 Partial	1.0447

=== Saros 118 ===
This eclipse is a part of Saros series 118, repeating every 18 years, 11 days, and containing 72 events. The series started with a partial solar eclipse on May 24, 803 AD. It contains total eclipses from August 19, 947 AD through October 25, 1650; hybrid eclipses on November 4, 1668 and November 15, 1686; and annular eclipses from November 27, 1704 through April 30, 1957. The series ends at member 72 as a partial eclipse on July 15, 2083. Its eclipses are tabulated in three columns; every third eclipse in the same column is one exeligmos apart, so they all cast shadows over approximately the same parts of the Earth.

The longest duration of totality was produced by member 34 at 6 minutes, 59 seconds on May 16, 1398, and the longest duration of annularity was produced by member 59 at 1 minutes, 58 seconds on February 23, 1849. All eclipses in this series occur at the Moon’s descending node of orbit.

Series members 57–72 occur between 1801 and 2083:
57	58	59
February 1, 1813	February 12, 1831	February 23, 1849
60	61	62
March 6, 1867	March 16, 1885	March 29, 1903
63	64	65
April 8, 1921	April 19, 1939	April 30, 1957
66	67	68
May 11, 1975	May 21, 1993	June 1, 2011
69	70	71
June 12, 2029	June 23, 2047	July 3, 2065
72
July 15, 2083

=== Metonic series ===
The metonic series repeats eclipses every 19 years (6939.69 days), lasting about 5 cycles. Eclipses occur in nearly the same calendar date. In addition, the octon subseries repeats 1/5 of that or every 3.8 years (1387.94 days). All eclipses in this table occur at the Moon's descending node.

22 eclipse events between June 23, 2047 and November 16, 2134
June 22–23	April 10–11	January 27–29	November 15–16	September 3–5
118	120	122	124	126
June 23, 2047	April 11, 2051	January 27, 2055	November 16, 2058	September 3, 2062
128	130	132	134	136
June 22, 2066	April 11, 2070	January 27, 2074	November 15, 2077	September 3, 2081
138	140	142	144	146
June 22, 2085	April 10, 2089	January 27, 2093	November 15, 2096	September 4, 2100
148	150	152	154	156
June 22, 2104	April 11, 2108	January 29, 2112	November 16, 2115	September 5, 2119
158	160	162	164	
June 23, 2123			November 16, 2134	

=== Tritos series ===
This eclipse is a part of a tritos cycle, repeating at alternating nodes every 135 synodic months (≈ 3986.63 days, or 11 years minus 1 month). Their appearance and longitude are irregular due to a lack of synchronization with the anomalistic month (period of perigee), but groupings of 3 tritos cycles (≈ 33 years minus 3 months) come close (≈ 434.044 anomalistic months), so eclipses are similar in these groupings.

Series members between 2036 and 2200
July 23, 2036 (Saros 117)	June 23, 2047 (Saros 118)	May 22, 2058 (Saros 119)	April 21, 2069 (Saros 120)	March 21, 2080 (Saros 121)
February 18, 2091 (Saros 122)	January 19, 2102 (Saros 123)	December 19, 2112 (Saros 124)	November 18, 2123 (Saros 125)	October 17, 2134 (Saros 126)
September 16, 2145 (Saros 127)	August 16, 2156 (Saros 128)	July 16, 2167 (Saros 129)	June 16, 2178 (Saros 130)	May 15, 2189 (Saros 131)
April 14, 2200 (Saros 132)

=== Inex series ===
This eclipse is a part of the long period inex cycle, repeating at alternating nodes, every 358 synodic months (≈ 10,571.95 days, or 29 years minus 20 days). Their appearance and longitude are irregular due to a lack of synchronization with the anomalistic month (period of perigee). However, groupings of 3 inex cycles (≈ 87 years minus 2 months) comes close (≈ 1,151.02 anomalistic months), so eclipses are similar in these groupings.

Series members between 1844 and 2200
November 10, 1844 (Saros 111)		
September 12, 1931 (Saros 114)		
July 13, 2018 (Saros 117)	June 23, 2047 (Saros 118)	June 1, 2076 (Saros 119)
May 14, 2105 (Saros 120)	April 24, 2134 (Saros 121)	April 3, 2163 (Saros 122)
March 13, 2192 (Saros 123)		
