= Solar eclipse of July 22, 2047 =

Future partial solar eclipse

- Partial eclipse
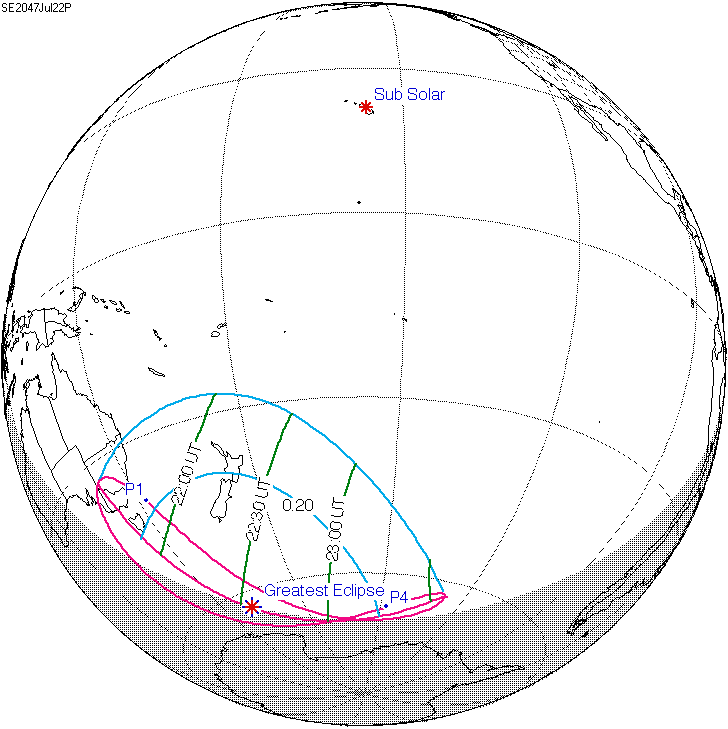
- Map
- Gamma: −1.3477
- Magnitude: 0.3604

Maximum eclipse
- Coordinates: 63.4°S 160.2°E

Times (UTC)
- Greatest eclipse: 22:36:17

References
- Saros: 156 (3 of 69)
- Catalog # (SE5000): 9613

A partial solar eclipse will occur at the Moon's descending node of orbit between Monday, July 22 and Tuesday, July 23, 2047, with a magnitude of 0.3604. A solar eclipse occurs when the Moon passes between Earth and the Sun, thereby totally or partly obscuring the image of the Sun for a viewer on Earth. A partial solar eclipse occurs in the polar regions of the Earth when the center of the Moon's shadow misses the Earth.

This will be the third of four partial solar eclipses in 2047, with the others occurring on January 26, June 23, and December 16.

The partial solar eclipse will be visible for parts of southeastern Australia and New Zealand.

== Images ==
Animated path

== Eclipse timing ==
=== Places experiencing partial eclipse ===
Solar Eclipse of July 22, 2047 (Local Times)
Country or territory	City or place	Start of partial eclipse	Maximum eclipse	End of partial eclipse	Duration of eclipse (hr:min)	Maximum coverage
Australia	Tamworth (Note: The times listed for this location occur on July 23, 2047, local time.)	07:23:30	07:37:31	07:51:52	0:28	0.30%
Australia	Dubbo	07:21:05	07:37:33	07:54:29	0:33	0.51%
Australia	Mudgee	07:18:38	07:38:38	07:59:21	0:41	0.92%
Australia	Newcastle	07:16:04	07:40:38	08:06:14	0:50	1.65%
Australia	Wagga Wagga	07:14:23	07:40:46	08:08:22	0:56	2.28%
Australia	Bendigo	07:28:28 (sunrise)	07:41:26	08:10:09	0:42	2.76%
Australia	Sydney	07:14:26	07:41:31	08:09:52	0:55	2.27%
Australia	Canterbury	07:14:23	07:41:31	08:09:56	0:56	2.29%
Australia	Bowral	07:13:45	07:41:50	08:11:16	0:58	2.59%
Australia	Wollongong	07:13:38	07:42:06	08:11:56	0:58	2.67%
Australia	Canberra	07:13:09	07:42:06	08:12:30	0:59	2.94%
Australia	Kiama	07:13:17	07:42:24	08:13:00	1:00	2.88%
Australia	Melton	07:29:27 (sunrise)	07:42:56	08:14:37	0:45	3.70%
Australia	Melbourne	07:28:13 (sunrise)	07:43:19	08:15:48	0:48	3.96%
Australia	Traralgon	07:22:50 (sunrise)	07:44:47	08:19:56	0:57	4.87%
Australia	Lord Howe Island	07:47:14	08:15:01	08:44:05	0:57	2.03%
Australia	Eden	07:11:07	07:45:14	08:21:16	1:15	4.87%
Norfolk Island	Kingston	08:27:50	08:51:44	09:16:29	0:49	1.01%
Australia	Hobart	07:31:48 (sunrise)	07:52:29	08:36:49	1:05	9.96%
New Zealand	Auckland	09:26:11	10:12:19	11:00:35	1:34	7.40%
New Zealand	Whitianga	09:27:41	10:13:43	11:01:44	1:34	7.20%
New Zealand	Hamilton	09:26:51	10:14:25	11:04:08	1:37	8.17%
New Zealand	Tauranga	09:28:18	10:15:36	11:04:56	1:37	7.88%
New Zealand	Palmerston North	09:27:36	10:18:32	11:11:39	1:44	10.47%
New Zealand	Wellington	09:26:40	10:18:38	11:12:56	1:46	11.51%
New Zealand	Christchurch	09:24:56	10:18:50	11:15:19	1:50	13.93%
New Zealand	Napier	09:29:32	10:19:15	11:10:59	1:41	9.34%
New Zealand	Dunedin	09:24:12	10:19:24	11:17:22	1:53	16.23%
Australia	Macquarie Island	07:27:34 (sunrise)	08:20:17	09:18:19	1:51	22.16%
New Zealand	Chatham Islands	10:27:47	11:20:03	12:13:25	1:46	10.75%

== Eclipse details ==
Shown below are two tables displaying details about this particular solar eclipse. The first table outlines times at which the Moon's penumbra or umbra attains the specific parameter, and the second table describes various other parameters pertaining to this eclipse.

July 22, 2047 Solar Eclipse Times
Event	Time (UTC)
First Penumbral External Contact	2047 July 22 at 21:11:17.6 UTC
Greatest Eclipse	2047 July 22 at 22:36:17.4 UTC
Ecliptic Conjunction	2047 July 22 at 22:50:35.0 UTC
Equatorial Conjunction	2047 July 22 at 23:24:11.3 UTC
Last Penumbral External Contact	2047 July 23 at 00:00:52.4 UTC

July 22, 2047 Solar Eclipse Parameters
Parameter	Value
Eclipse Magnitude	0.36048
Eclipse Obscuration	0.24432
Gamma	−1.34766
Sun Right Ascension	08h08m59.7s
Sun Declination	+20°07'53.9"
Sun Semi-Diameter	15'44.5"
Sun Equatorial Horizontal Parallax	08.7"
Moon Right Ascension	08h07m21.2s
Moon Declination	+18°54'51.1"
Moon Semi-Diameter	15'32.1"
Moon Equatorial Horizontal Parallax	0°57'00.9"
ΔT	82.7 s

== Eclipse season ==
This eclipse is part of an eclipse season, a period, roughly every six months, when eclipses occur. Only two (or occasionally three) eclipse seasons occur each year, and each season lasts about 35 days and repeats just short of six months (173 days) later; thus two full eclipse seasons always occur each year. Either two or three eclipses happen each eclipse season. In the sequence below, each eclipse is separated by a fortnight. The first and last eclipse in this sequence is separated by one synodic month.

Eclipse season of June–July 2047
June 23 Descending node (new moon)	July 7 Ascending node (full moon)	July 22 Descending node (new moon)
Partial solar eclipse Solar Saros 118	Total lunar eclipse Lunar Saros 130	Partial solar eclipse Solar Saros 156

== Related eclipses ==
=== Eclipses in 2047 ===
- A total lunar eclipse on January 12.
- A partial solar eclipse on January 26.
- A partial solar eclipse on June 23.
- A total lunar eclipse on July 7.
- A partial solar eclipse on July 22.
- A partial solar eclipse on December 16.

=== Metonic ===
- Preceded by: Solar eclipse of October 3, 2043

=== Tzolkinex ===
- Followed by: Solar eclipse of September 2, 2054

=== Half-Saros ===
- Preceded by: Lunar eclipse of July 16, 2038
- Followed by: Lunar eclipse of July 26, 2056

=== Tritos ===
- Preceded by: Solar eclipse of August 21, 2036
- Followed by: Solar eclipse of June 21, 2058

=== Solar Saros 156 ===
- Preceded by: Solar eclipse of July 11, 2029
- Followed by: Solar eclipse of August 2, 2065

=== Inex ===
- Preceded by: Solar eclipse of August 11, 2018
- Followed by: Solar eclipse of July 1, 2076

=== Triad ===
- Preceded by: Solar eclipse of September 20, 1960
- Followed by: Solar eclipse of May 23, 2134

=== Solar eclipses of 2044–2047 ===
This eclipse is a member of a semester series. An eclipse in a semester series of solar eclipses repeats approximately every 177 days and 4 hours (a semester) at alternating nodes of the Moon's orbit.

The partial solar eclipses on June 23, 2047 and December 16, 2047 occur in the next lunar year eclipse set.

Solar eclipse series sets from 2044 to 2047
Ascending node			Descending node		
Saros	Map	Gamma	Saros	Map	Gamma
121	February 28, 2044 Annular	−0.9954	126	August 23, 2044 Total	0.9613
131	February 16, 2045 Annular	−0.3125	136	August 12, 2045 Total	0.2116
141	February 5, 2046 Annular	0.3765	146	August 2, 2046 Total	−0.535
151	January 26, 2047 Partial	1.045	156	July 22, 2047 Partial	−1.3477

=== Saros 156 ===
This eclipse is a part of Saros series 156, repeating every 18 years, 11 days, and containing 69 events. The series started with a partial solar eclipse on July 1, 2011. It contains annular eclipses from September 26, 2155 through April 7, 3075. There are no hybrid or total eclipses in this set. The series ends at member 69 as a partial eclipse on July 14, 3237. Its eclipses are tabulated in three columns; every third eclipse in the same column is one exeligmos apart, so they all cast shadows over approximately the same parts of the Earth.

The longest duration of annularity will be produced by member 29 at 8 minutes, 28 seconds on May 3, 2516. All eclipses in this series occur at the Moon’s descending node of orbit.

Series members 1–11 occur between 2011 and 2200:
1	2	3
July 1, 2011	July 11, 2029	July 22, 2047
4	5	6
August 2, 2065	August 13, 2083	August 24, 2101
7	8	9
September 5, 2119	September 15, 2137	September 26, 2155
10	11	
October 7, 2173	October 18, 2191	

=== Metonic series ===
The metonic series repeats eclipses every 19 years (6939.69 days), lasting about 5 cycles. Eclipses occur in nearly the same calendar date. In addition, the octon subseries repeats 1/5 of that or every 3.8 years (1387.94 days). All eclipses in this table occur at the Moon's descending node.

21 eclipse events between July 22, 1971 and July 22, 2047
July 22	May 9–11	February 26–27	December 14–15	October 2–3
116	118	120	122	124
July 22, 1971	May 11, 1975	February 26, 1979	December 15, 1982	October 3, 1986
126	128	130	132	134
July 22, 1990	May 10, 1994	February 26, 1998	December 14, 2001	October 3, 2005
136	138	140	142	144
July 22, 2009	May 10, 2013	February 26, 2017	December 14, 2020	October 2, 2024
146	148	150	152	154
July 22, 2028	May 9, 2032	February 27, 2036	December 15, 2039	October 3, 2043
156
July 22, 2047

=== Tritos series ===
This eclipse is a part of a tritos cycle, repeating at alternating nodes every 135 synodic months (≈ 3986.63 days, or 11 years minus 1 month). Their appearance and longitude are irregular due to a lack of synchronization with the anomalistic month (period of perigee), but groupings of 3 tritos cycles (≈ 33 years minus 3 months) come close (≈ 434.044 anomalistic months), so eclipses are similar in these groupings.

The partial solar eclipses on November 16, 2134 (part of Saros 164) and October 16, 2145 (part of Saros 165) are also a part of this series but are not included in the table below.

Series members between 1801 and 2069
June 6, 1807 (Saros 134)	May 5, 1818 (Saros 135)	April 3, 1829 (Saros 136)	March 4, 1840 (Saros 137)	February 1, 1851 (Saros 138)
December 31, 1861 (Saros 139)	November 30, 1872 (Saros 140)	October 30, 1883 (Saros 141)	September 29, 1894 (Saros 142)	August 30, 1905 (Saros 143)
July 30, 1916 (Saros 144)	June 29, 1927 (Saros 145)	May 29, 1938 (Saros 146)	April 28, 1949 (Saros 147)	March 27, 1960 (Saros 148)
February 25, 1971 (Saros 149)	January 25, 1982 (Saros 150)	December 24, 1992 (Saros 151)	November 23, 2003 (Saros 152)	October 23, 2014 (Saros 153)
September 21, 2025 (Saros 154)	August 21, 2036 (Saros 155)	July 22, 2047 (Saros 156)	June 21, 2058 (Saros 157)	May 20, 2069 (Saros 158)

=== Inex series ===
This eclipse is a part of the long period inex cycle, repeating at alternating nodes, every 358 synodic months (≈ 10,571.95 days, or 29 years minus 20 days). Their appearance and longitude are irregular due to a lack of synchronization with the anomalistic month (period of perigee). However, groupings of 3 inex cycles (≈ 87 years minus 2 months) comes close (≈ 1,151.02 anomalistic months), so eclipses are similar in these groupings.

Series members between 1801 and 2200
December 30, 1815 (Saros 148)	December 9, 1844 (Saros 149)	November 20, 1873 (Saros 150)
October 31, 1902 (Saros 151)	October 11, 1931 (Saros 152)	September 20, 1960 (Saros 153)
August 31, 1989 (Saros 154)	August 11, 2018 (Saros 155)	July 22, 2047 (Saros 156)
July 1, 2076 (Saros 157)	June 12, 2105 (Saros 158)	May 23, 2134 (Saros 159)
	April 12, 2192 (Saros 161)	
