= Solar eclipse of September 23, 2033 =

Future partial solar eclipse

- Partial eclipse
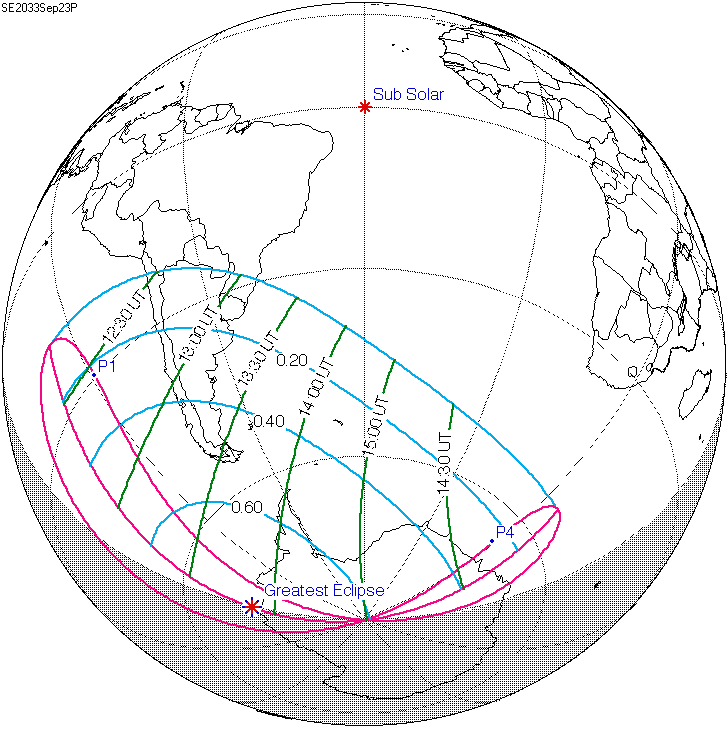
- Map
- Gamma: −1.1583
- Magnitude: 0.689

Maximum eclipse
- Coordinates: 72.2°S 121.2°W

Times (UTC)
- Greatest eclipse: 13:54:31

References
- Saros: 125 (55 of 73)
- Catalog # (SE5000): 9582

A partial solar eclipse will occur at the Moon's ascending node of orbit on Friday, September 23, 2033, with a magnitude of 0.689. A solar eclipse occurs when the Moon passes between Earth and the Sun, thereby totally or partly obscuring the image of the Sun for a viewer on Earth. A partial solar eclipse occurs in the polar regions of the Earth when the center of the Moon's shadow misses the Earth.

A partial eclipse will be visible for parts of southern South America and Antarctica.

== Images ==
Animated path

== Eclipse timing ==
=== Places experiencing partial eclipse ===
Solar Eclipse of March 30, 2033 (Local Times)
Country or territory	City or place	Start of partial eclipse	Maximum eclipse	End of partial eclipse	Duration of eclipse (hr:min)	Maximum coverage
Argentina	Salta	09:13:33	09:37:36	10:02:48	0:49	0.91%
Argentina	San Miguel de Tucumán	09:08:07	09:41:40	10:17:26	1:09	2.56%
Chile	Santiago	08:56:53	09:49:36	10:47:38	1:51	12.93%
Argentina	Mendoza	08:58:38	09:50:08	10:46:42	1:48	11.35%
Argentina	Córdoba	09:05:04	09:51:53	10:42:48	1:38	7.22%
Paraguay	Encarnación	09:38:35	09:53:45	10:09:18	0:31	0.16%
Brazil	Uruguaiana	09:22:47	09:57:12	10:33:38	1:11	2.17%
Argentina	Rosario	09:10:46	09:59:14	10:51:46	1:41	7.27%
Uruguay	Paysandú	09:16:33	10:01:14	10:49:17	1:33	5.17%
Uruguay	Rivera	09:25:18	10:01:45	10:40:23	1:15	2.50%
Uruguay	Tacuarembó	09:22:37	10:02:52	10:45:46	1:23	3.47%
Argentina	Neuquén	09:02:49	10:03:23	11:10:12	2:07	19.32%
Uruguay	Durazno	09:19:33	10:05:39	10:55:10	1:36	5.48%
Argentina	Buenos Aires	09:14:55	10:05:42	11:00:39	1:46	7.96%
Brazil	Porto Alegre	09:47:23	10:06:28	10:26:06	0:39	0.29%
Chile	Easter Island	08:05:10 (sunrise)	08:07:53	08:09:38	0:04	0.21%
Uruguay	Montevideo	09:19:37	10:09:24	11:03:01	1:43	7.01%
Argentina	Mar del Plata	09:17:01	10:14:06	11:15:58	1:59	11.64%
Chile	Punta Arenas	09:19:56	10:30:19	11:46:32	2:27	38.81%
Argentina	Ushuaia	09:24:43	10:36:02	11:52:44	2:28	39.17%
Falkland Islands	Stanley	09:30:20	10:41:27	11:57:13	2:27	29.35%
Antarctica	Palmer Station	09:45:37	10:58:00	12:13:32	2:28	45.79%
Antarctica	Carlini Base	09:45:39	10:58:41	12:14:45	2:29	41.12%
Antarctica	Rothera Research Station	09:48:04	10:59:37	12:14:04	2:26	49.23%
Antarctica	San Martín Base	09:49:41	11:01:13	12:15:30	2:26	49.15%
Antarctica	Esperanza Base	09:49:01	11:02:00	12:17:41	2:29	41.31%
Antarctica	Marambio Base	09:50:39	11:03:33	12:18:59	2:28	41.86%
Antarctica	Orcadas Base	09:59:12	11:11:33	12:25:16	2:26	31.72%
South Georgia and the South Sandwich Islands	King Edward Point	11:09:00	12:15:47	13:23:00	2:14	17.98%
Bouvet Island	Bouvet Island	16:42:33	17:11:18	17:39:10	0:57	1.63%

== Eclipse details ==
Shown below are two tables displaying details about this particular solar eclipse. The first table outlines times at which the Moon's penumbra or umbra attains the specific parameter, and the second table describes various other parameters pertaining to this eclipse.

September 23, 2033 Solar Eclipse Times
Event	Time (UTC)
First Penumbral External Contact	2033 September 23 at 11:49:06.6 UTC
Ecliptic Conjunction	2033 September 23 at 13:40:57.2 UTC
Greatest Eclipse	2033 September 23 at 13:54:31.2 UTC
Equatorial Conjunction	2033 September 23 at 14:38:37.5 UTC
Last Penumbral External Contact	2033 September 23 at 15:59:37.1 UTC

September 23, 2033 Solar Eclipse Parameters
Parameter	Value
Eclipse Magnitude	0.68898
Eclipse Obscuration	0.59351
Gamma	−1.15830
Sun Right Ascension	12h03m08.9s
Sun Declination	-00°20'27.7"
Sun Semi-Diameter	15'56.3"
Sun Equatorial Horizontal Parallax	08.8"
Moon Right Ascension	12h01m52.5s
Moon Declination	-01°19'54.7"
Moon Semi-Diameter	14'43.6"
Moon Equatorial Horizontal Parallax	0°54'03.0"
ΔT	75.5 s

== Eclipse season ==
This eclipse is part of an eclipse season, a period, roughly every six months, when eclipses occur. Only two (or occasionally three) eclipse seasons occur each year, and each season lasts about 35 days and repeats just short of six months (173 days) later; thus two full eclipse seasons always occur each year. Either two or three eclipses happen each eclipse season. In the sequence below, each eclipse is separated by a fortnight.

Eclipse season of September–October 2033
September 23 Ascending node (new moon)	October 8 Descending node (full moon)
Partial solar eclipse Solar Saros 125	Total lunar eclipse Lunar Saros 137

== Related eclipses ==
=== Eclipses in 2033 ===
- A total solar eclipse on March 30.
- A total lunar eclipse on April 14.
- A partial solar eclipse on September 23.
- A total lunar eclipse on October 8.

=== Metonic ===
- Preceded by: Solar eclipse of December 5, 2029
- Followed by: Solar eclipse of July 13, 2037

=== Tzolkinex ===
- Preceded by: Solar eclipse of August 12, 2026
- Followed by: Solar eclipse of November 4, 2040

=== Half-Saros ===
- Preceded by: Lunar eclipse of September 18, 2024
- Followed by: Lunar eclipse of September 29, 2042

=== Tritos ===
- Preceded by: Solar eclipse of October 25, 2022
- Followed by: Solar eclipse of August 23, 2044

=== Solar Saros 125 ===
- Preceded by: Solar eclipse of September 13, 2015
- Followed by: Solar eclipse of October 4, 2051

=== Inex ===
- Preceded by: Solar eclipse of October 14, 2004
- Followed by: Solar eclipse of September 3, 2062

=== Triad ===
- Preceded by: Solar eclipse of November 23, 1946
- Followed by: Solar eclipse of July 25, 2120

=== Solar eclipses of 2033–2036 ===
This eclipse is a member of a semester series. An eclipse in a semester series of solar eclipses repeats approximately every 177 days and 4 hours (a semester) at alternating nodes of the Moon's orbit.

The partial solar eclipse on July 23, 2036 occurs in the next lunar year eclipse set.

Solar eclipse series sets from 2033 to 2036
Descending node			Ascending node		
Saros	Map	Gamma	Saros	Map	Gamma
120	March 30, 2033 Total	0.9778	125	September 23, 2033 Partial	−1.1583
130	March 20, 2034 Total	0.2894	135	September 12, 2034 Annular	−0.3936
140	March 9, 2035 Annular	−0.4368	145	September 2, 2035 Total	0.3727
150	February 27, 2036 Partial	−1.1942	155	August 21, 2036 Partial	1.0825

=== Saros 125 ===
This eclipse is a part of Saros series 125, repeating every 18 years, 11 days, and containing 73 events. The series started with a partial solar eclipse on February 4, 1060. It contains total eclipses from June 13, 1276 through July 16, 1330; hybrid eclipses on July 26, 1348 and August 7, 1366; and annular eclipses from August 17, 1384 through August 22, 1979. The series ends at member 73 as a partial eclipse on April 9, 2358. Its eclipses are tabulated in three columns; every third eclipse in the same column is one exeligmos apart, so they all cast shadows over approximately the same parts of the Earth.

The longest duration of totality was produced by member 14 at 1 minutes, 11 seconds on June 25, 1294, and the longest duration of annularity was produced by member 48 at 7 minutes, 23 seconds on July 10, 1907. All eclipses in this series occur at the Moon’s ascending node of orbit.

Series members 43–64 occur between 1801 and 2200:
43	44	45
May 16, 1817	May 27, 1835	June 6, 1853
46	47	48
June 18, 1871	June 28, 1889	July 10, 1907
49	50	51
July 20, 1925	August 1, 1943	August 11, 1961
52	53	54
August 22, 1979	September 2, 1997	September 13, 2015
55	56	57
September 23, 2033	October 4, 2051	October 15, 2069
58	59	60
October 26, 2087	November 6, 2105	November 18, 2123
61	62	63
November 28, 2141	December 9, 2159	December 20, 2177
64
December 31, 2195

=== Metonic series ===
The metonic series repeats eclipses every 19 years (6939.69 days), lasting about 5 cycles. Eclipses occur in nearly the same calendar date. In addition, the octon subseries repeats 1/5 of that or every 3.8 years (1387.94 days). All eclipses in this table occur at the Moon's ascending node.

21 eclipse events between July 13, 2018 and July 12, 2094
July 12–13	April 30–May 1	February 16–17	December 5–6	September 22–23
117	119	121	123	125
July 13, 2018	April 30, 2022	February 17, 2026	December 5, 2029	September 23, 2033
127	129	131	133	135
July 13, 2037	April 30, 2041	February 16, 2045	December 5, 2048	September 22, 2052
137	139	141	143	145
July 12, 2056	April 30, 2060	February 17, 2064	December 6, 2067	September 23, 2071
147	149	151	153	155
July 13, 2075	May 1, 2079	February 16, 2083	December 6, 2086	September 23, 2090
157
July 12, 2094

=== Tritos series ===
This eclipse is a part of a tritos cycle, repeating at alternating nodes every 135 synodic months (≈ 3986.63 days, or 11 years minus 1 month). Their appearance and longitude are irregular due to a lack of synchronization with the anomalistic month (period of perigee), but groupings of 3 tritos cycles (≈ 33 years minus 3 months) come close (≈ 434.044 anomalistic months), so eclipses are similar in these groupings.

Series members between 1837 and 2200
April 5, 1837 (Saros 107)	March 5, 1848 (Saros 108)	February 3, 1859 (Saros 109)		December 2, 1880 (Saros 111)
		August 31, 1913 (Saros 114)	July 31, 1924 (Saros 115)	June 30, 1935 (Saros 116)
May 30, 1946 (Saros 117)	April 30, 1957 (Saros 118)	March 28, 1968 (Saros 119)	February 26, 1979 (Saros 120)	January 26, 1990 (Saros 121)
December 25, 2000 (Saros 122)	November 25, 2011 (Saros 123)	October 25, 2022 (Saros 124)	September 23, 2033 (Saros 125)	August 23, 2044 (Saros 126)
July 24, 2055 (Saros 127)	June 22, 2066 (Saros 128)	May 22, 2077 (Saros 129)	April 21, 2088 (Saros 130)	March 21, 2099 (Saros 131)
February 18, 2110 (Saros 132)	January 19, 2121 (Saros 133)	December 19, 2131 (Saros 134)	November 17, 2142 (Saros 135)	October 17, 2153 (Saros 136)
September 16, 2164 (Saros 137)	August 16, 2175 (Saros 138)	July 16, 2186 (Saros 139)	June 15, 2197 (Saros 140)	

=== Inex series ===
This eclipse is a part of the long period inex cycle, repeating at alternating nodes, every 358 synodic months (≈ 10,571.95 days, or 29 years minus 20 days). Their appearance and longitude are irregular due to a lack of synchronization with the anomalistic month (period of perigee). However, groupings of 3 inex cycles (≈ 87 years minus 2 months) comes close (≈ 1,151.02 anomalistic months), so eclipses are similar in these groupings.

Series members between 1801 and 2200
March 4, 1802 (Saros 117)	February 12, 1831 (Saros 118)	January 23, 1860 (Saros 119)
January 1, 1889 (Saros 120)	December 14, 1917 (Saros 121)	November 23, 1946 (Saros 122)
November 3, 1975 (Saros 123)	October 14, 2004 (Saros 124)	September 23, 2033 (Saros 125)
September 3, 2062 (Saros 126)	August 15, 2091 (Saros 127)	July 25, 2120 (Saros 128)
July 5, 2149 (Saros 129)	June 16, 2178 (Saros 130)	
