= Solar eclipse of April 20, 2023 =

- Hybrid eclipse
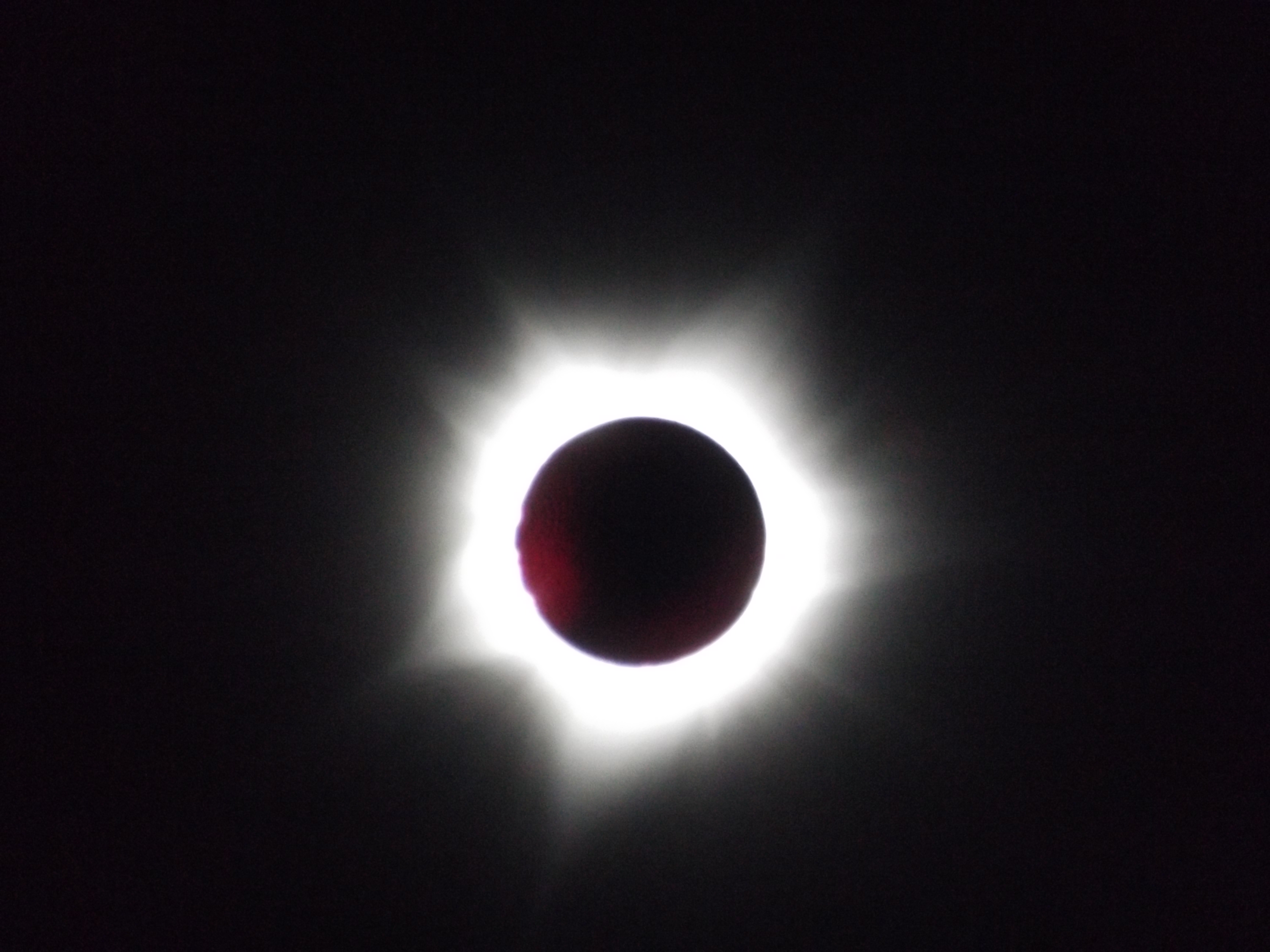
- Totality from Exmouth, Western Australia

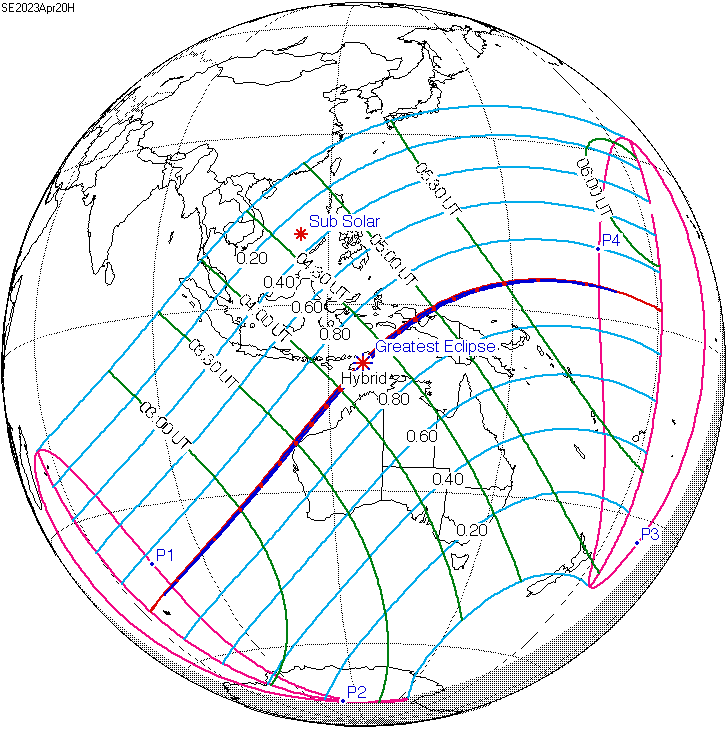
- Map
- Gamma: −0.3952
- Magnitude: 1.0132

Maximum eclipse
- Duration: 76 s (1 min 16 s)
- Coordinates: 9.6°S 125.8°E
- Max. width of band: 49 km (30 mi)

Times (UTC)
- Greatest eclipse: 4:17:56

References
- Saros: 129 (52 of 80)
- Catalog # (SE5000): 9559

A total solar eclipse occurred at the Moon’s ascending node of orbit on Thursday, April 20, 2023, with a magnitude of 1.0132. It was a hybrid event, a narrow total eclipse, and beginning and ending as an annular eclipse. A solar eclipse occurs when the Moon passes between Earth and the Sun thereby totally or partly obscuring the Sun for a viewer on Earth. A hybrid solar eclipse is a rare type of solar eclipse that changes its appearance from annular to total and back as the Moon's shadow moves across the Earth's surface. Totality occurs between the annularity paths across the surface of the Earth, with the partial solar eclipse visible over a surrounding region thousands of kilometres wide. Hybrid solar eclipses are extremely rare, occurring in only 3.1% of solar eclipses in the 21st century. Occurring about 4.1 days after perigee (on April 16, 2023, at 3:20 UTC), the Moon's apparent diameter was larger.

Totality for this eclipse was visible in the North West Cape peninsula and Barrow Island in Western Australia, eastern parts of East Timor, as well as Damar Island and parts of the province of Papua in Indonesia. A partial eclipse was visible for parts of Antarctica, Australia, Oceania, and Southeast Asia. More than 20,000 people watched the eclipse from the town of Exmouth on Western Australia's North West Cape. Providing infrastructure and services for the visitors (Exmouth's normal population is less than 3,000) cost the State Government of Western Australia A$20 million (US$13.5 million). The date marked a significant moment of astrotourism and tourism in Western Australia.

== Images ==
Animated path of the eclipse

Animation of images from Himawari 9 showing the Moon's shadow moving across the Earth.

== Eclipse timing ==
=== Places experiencing total eclipse ===
Solar Eclipse of April 20, 2023 (Local Times)
Country or territory	City or place	Start of partial eclipse	Start of total eclipse	Maximum eclipse	End of total eclipse	End of partial eclipse	Duration of totality (min:s)	Duration of eclipse (hr:min)	Maximum magnitude
Australia	Exmouth	10:04:29	11:29:45	11:30:13	11:30:41	13:02:29	0:56	2:58	1.0035

=== Places experiencing partial eclipse ===
Solar Eclipse of April 20, 2023 (Local Times)
Country or territory	City or place	Start of partial eclipse	Maximum eclipse	End of partial eclipse	Duration of eclipse (hr:min)	Maximum coverage
French Southern and Antarctic Lands	Île Amsterdam	06:34:39	07:37:48	08:46:59	2:12	75.28%
French Southern and Antarctic Lands	Port-aux-Français	07:07:05 (sunrise)	07:38:51	08:44:33	1:37	91.27%
Australia	Perth	09:59:58	11:20:27	12:46:29	2:47	70.77%
Christmas Island	Flying Fish Cove	09:17:46	10:34:54	11:58:24	2:41	46.40%
Indonesia	Jakarta	09:29:31	10:45:20	12:06:33	2:37	38.78%
Indonesia	Denpasar	10:28:32	11:56:24	13:28:51	3:00	68.68%
Indonesia	Makassar	10:41:28	12:12:20	13:45:33	3:04	71.58%
Timor-Leste	Dili	11:43:24	13:18:26	14:53:41	3:10	97.95%
Australia	Darwin	12:17:36	13:52:23	15:25:25	3:08	80.74%
Brunei	Bandar Seri Begawan	11:06:53	12:24:33	13:43:40	2:37	33.77%
Philippines	General Santos	11:19:06	12:47:40	14:13:37	2:55	55.65%
Philippines	Davao City	11:22:30	12:50:22	14:15:20	2:53	53.88%
Indonesia	Manokwari	12:16:50	13:53:18	15:23:24	3:07	96.46%
Philippines	Manila	11:44:21	12:54:52	14:03:53	2:20	23.73%
Papua New Guinea	Port Moresby	13:37:38	15:06:31	16:25:34	2:48	59.34%
Palau	Ngerulmud	12:37:42	14:09:12	15:33:31	2:56	70.84%
Samoa	Apia	17:45:14	18:15:34	18:18:10 (sunset)	0:33	27.20%
Vanuatu	Port Vila	15:24:31	16:27:16	17:23:13	1:59	29.04%
Solomon Islands	Honiara	15:12:05	16:29:23	17:36:44	2:25	51.13%
Wallis and Futuna	Mata Utu	16:43:21	17:33:57	17:36:12 (sunset)	0:53	43.75%
Guam	Hagåtña	14:10:57	15:34:29	16:48:53	2:38	63.12%
Fiji	Suva	16:37:28	17:34:49	17:53:40 (sunset)	1:16	30.63%
Northern Mariana Islands	Saipan	14:16:36	15:37:29	16:49:38	2:33	57.68%
United States Minor Outlying Islands	Baker Island	16:50:36	17:45:25	17:48:28 (sunset)	0:58	78.19%
Federated States of Micronesia	Palikir	15:25:01	16:46:03	17:56:18	2:31	93.96%
Tuvalu	Funafuti	16:42:14	17:46:49	17:58:41 (sunset)	1:16	58.12%
Nauru	Yaren	16:32:24	17:47:39	18:53:01	2:22	79.92%
Kiribati	Tarawa	16:42:14	17:53:09	18:31:32 (sunset)	1:49	89.13%
Marshall Islands	Majuro	16:45:14	17:56:10	18:42:40 (sunset)	1:57	90.44%
United States Minor Outlying Islands	Wake Island	16:54:39	17:58:40	18:56:08	2:01	46.26%

== Gallery ==
=== Totality ===
Video of the eclipse from Exmouth, Australia

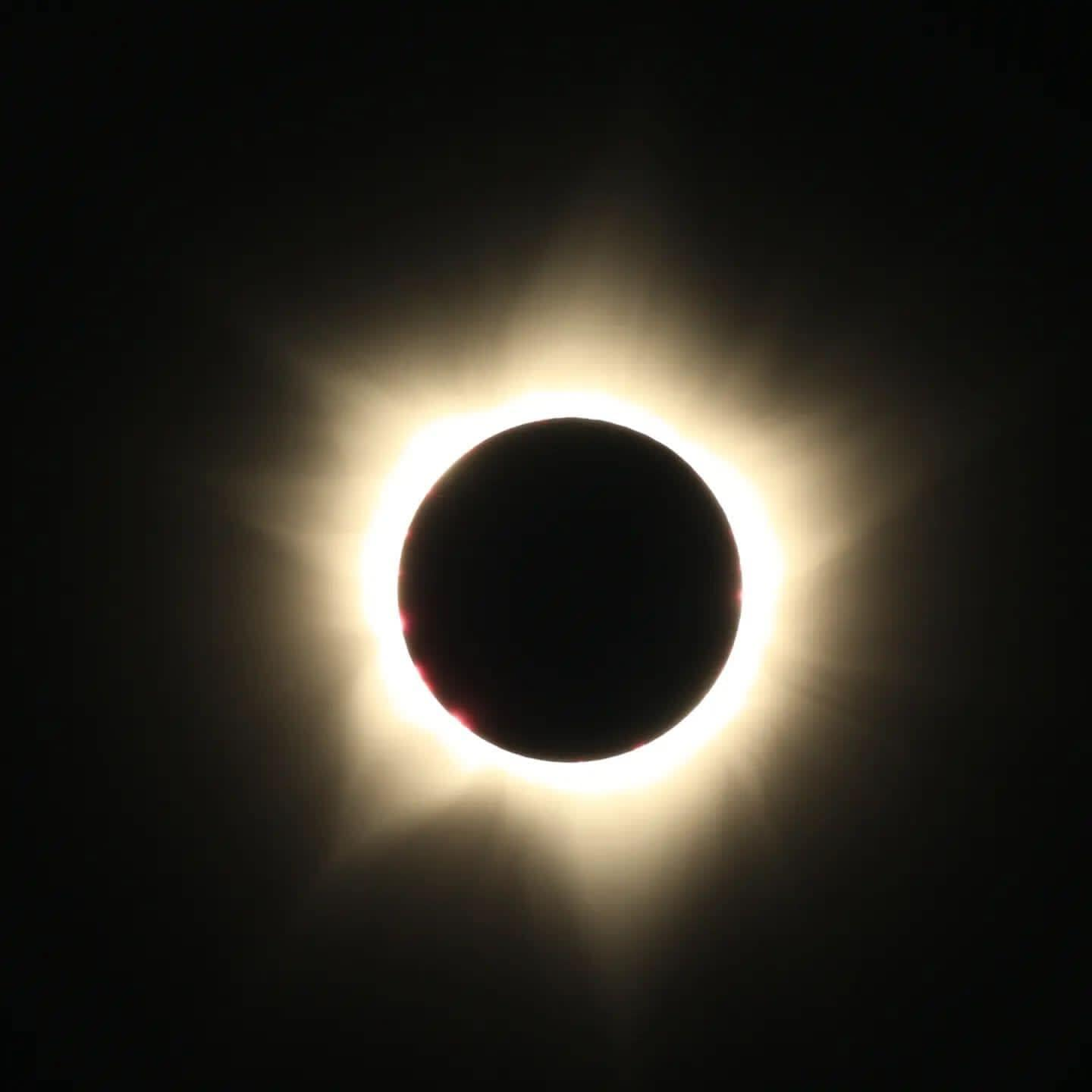
From Com, East Timor

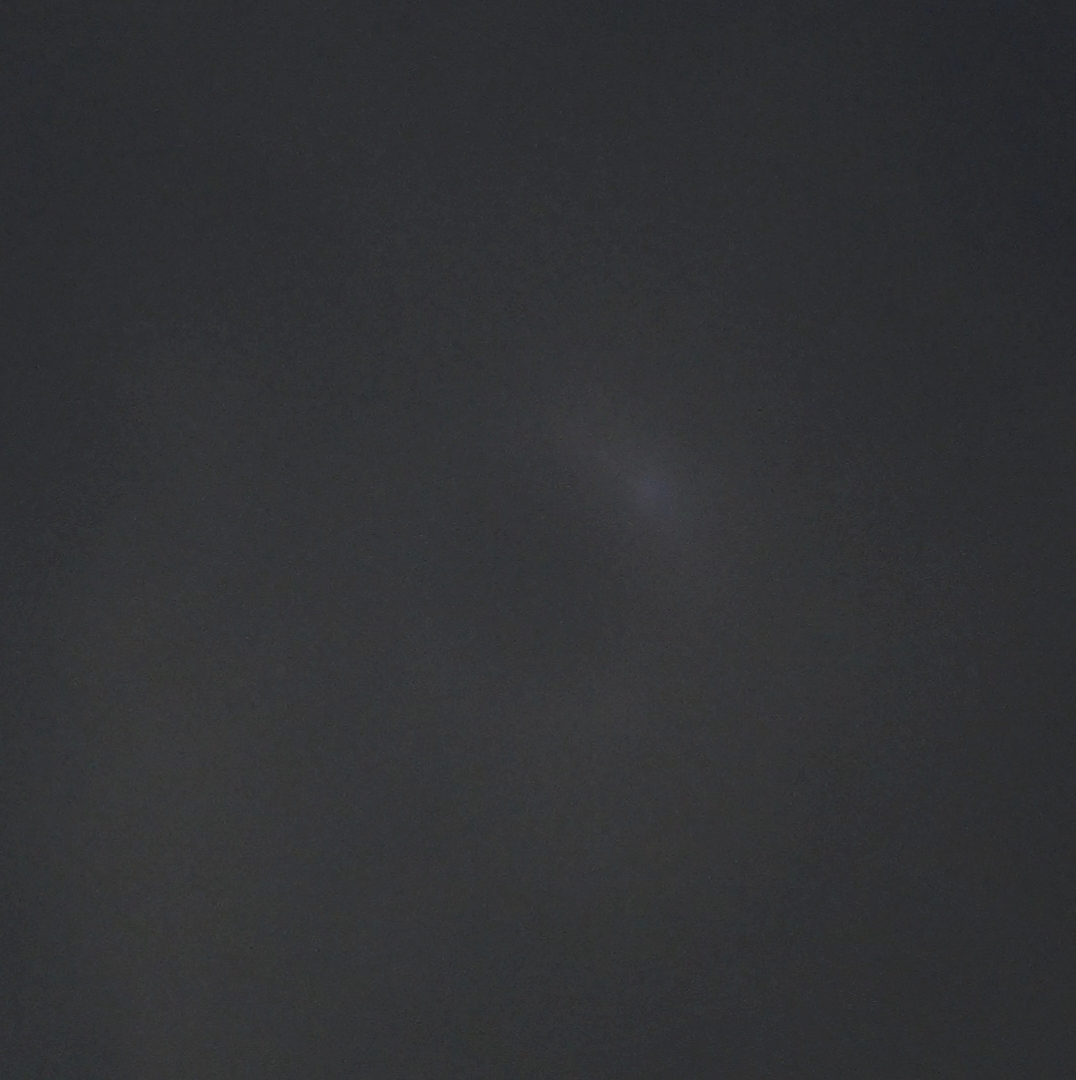
From Biak, Indonesia, 4:56 UTC

=== Partiality ===
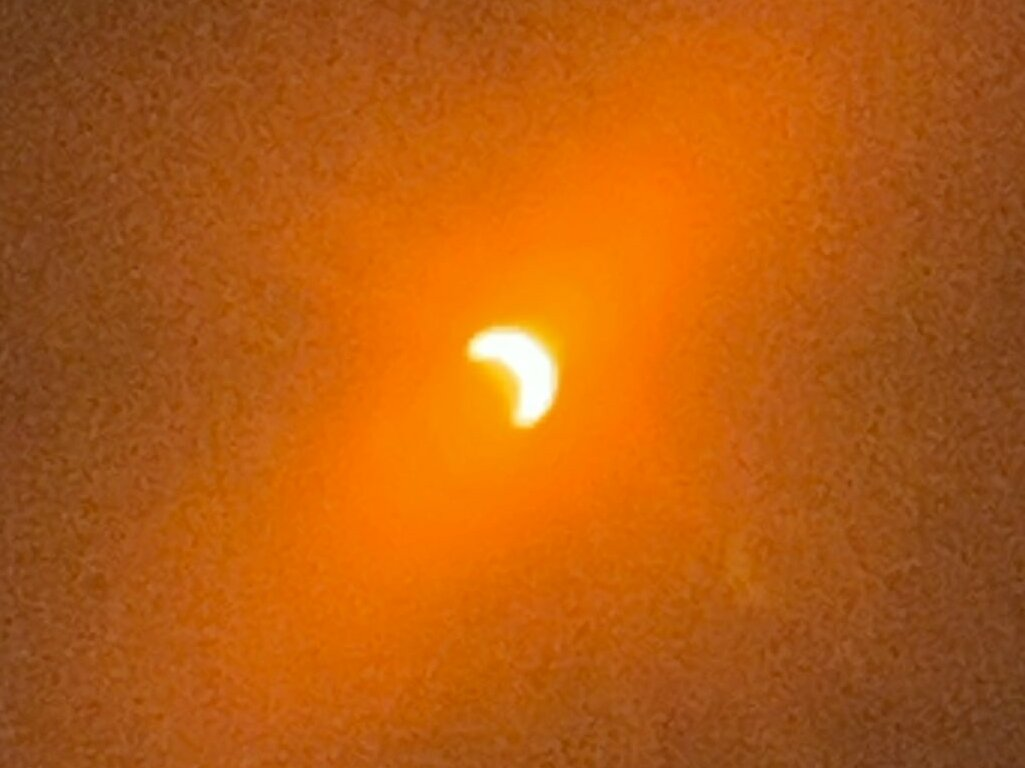
From Perth, Australia, ~3:20 UTC

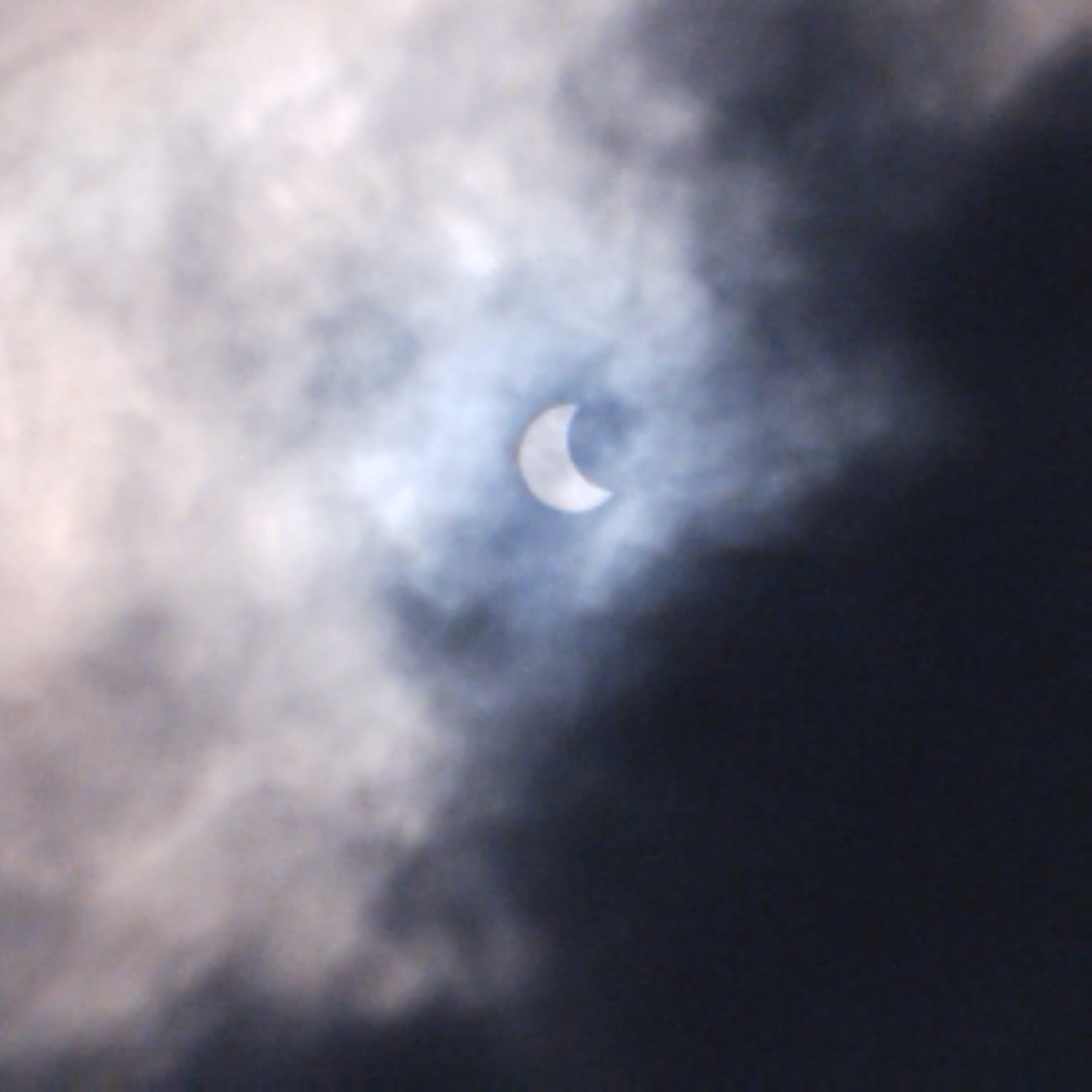
From Tasikmalaya, Indonesia, 3:31 UTC

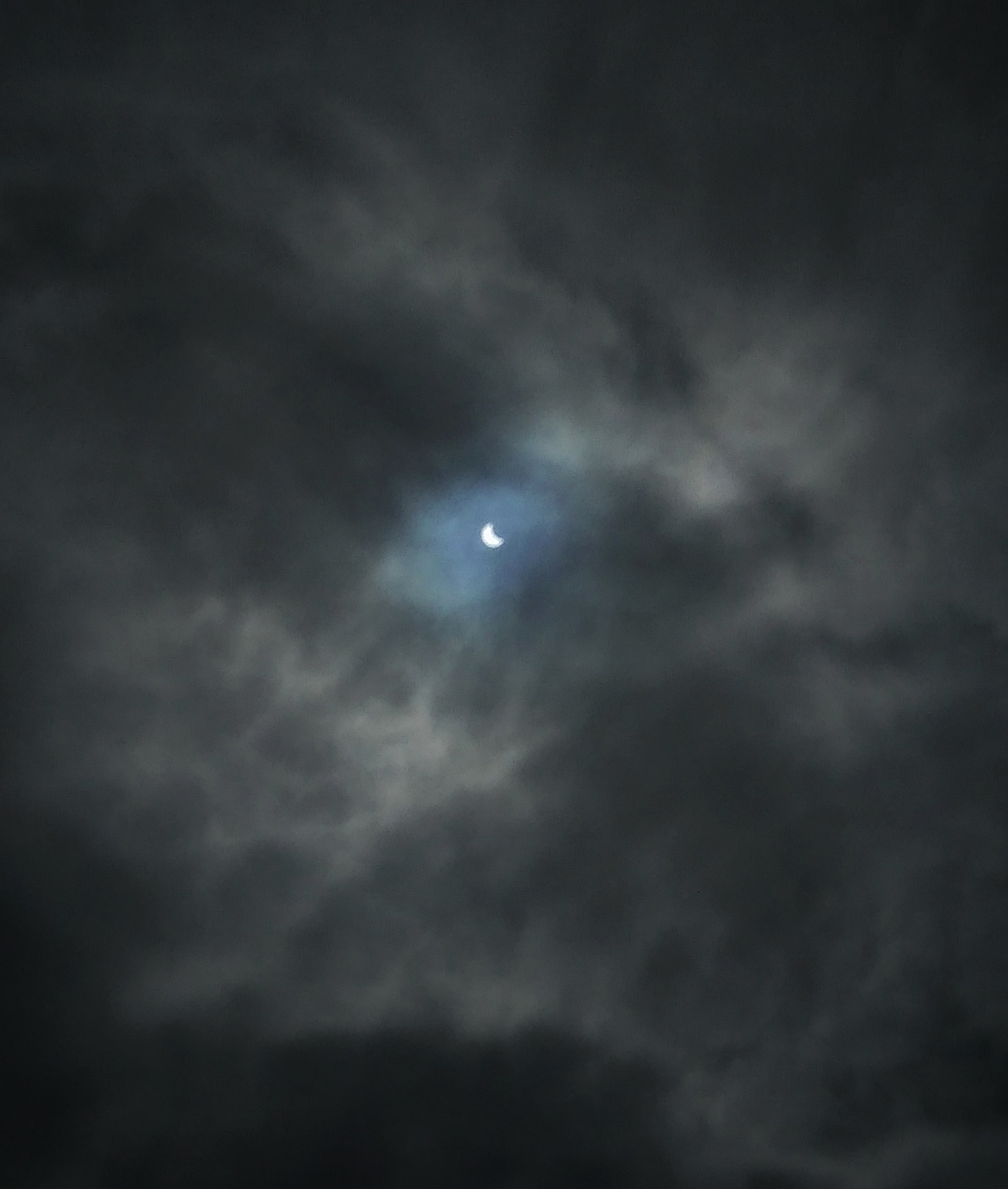
From Gambut District, Indonesia, 3:41 UTC

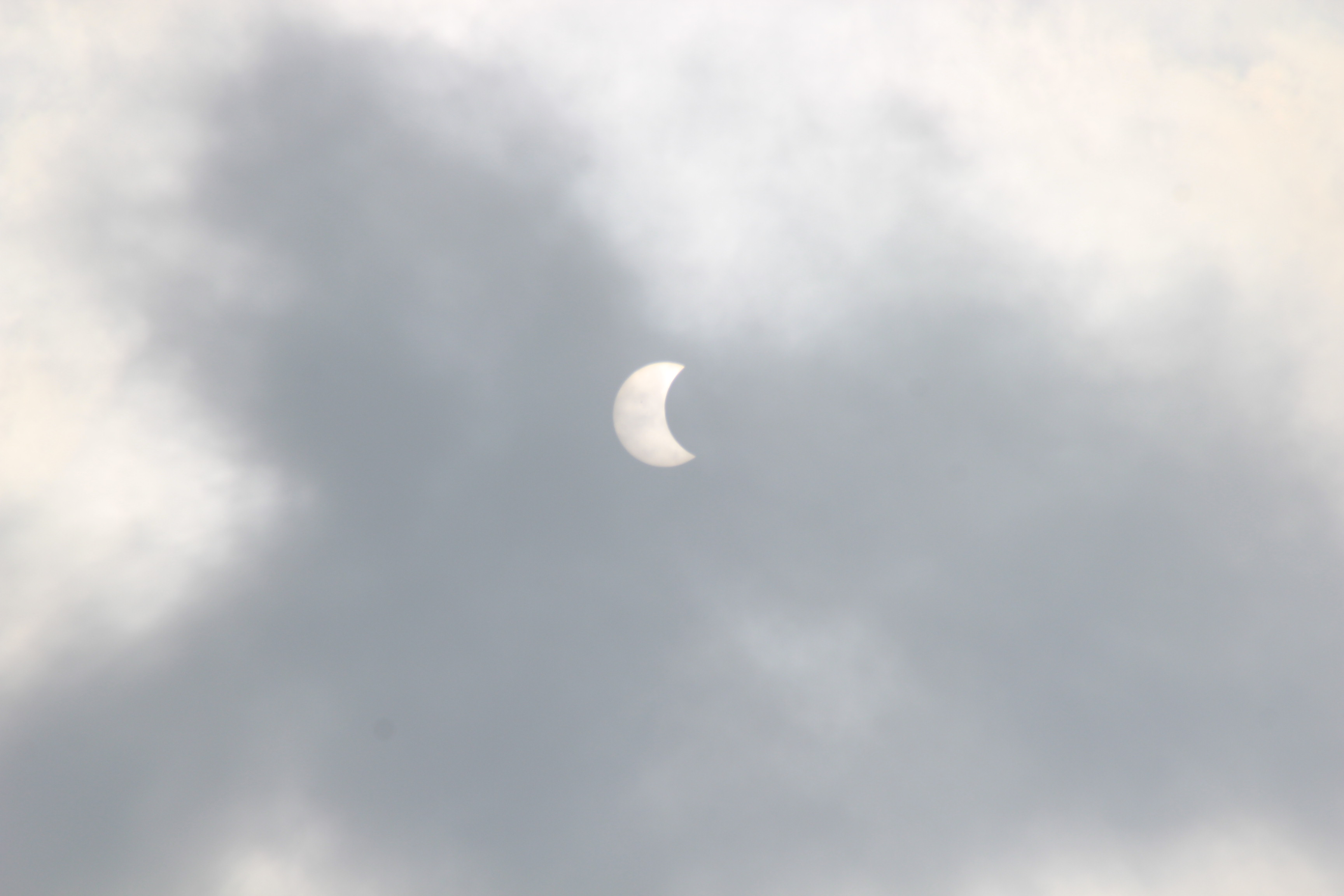
From Bekasi, Indonesia, 3:45 UTC

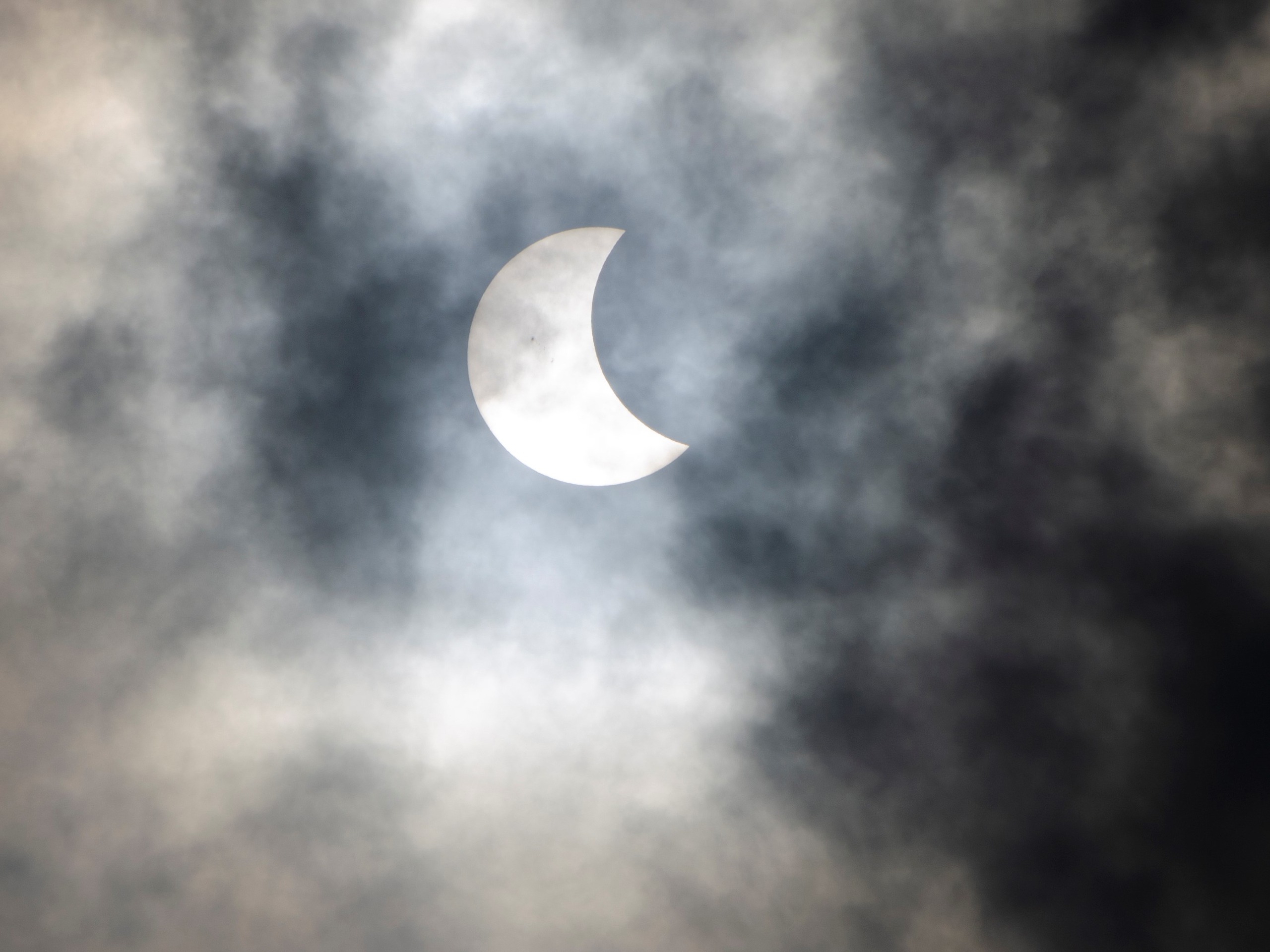
From Jakarta, Indonesia, 3:47 UTC

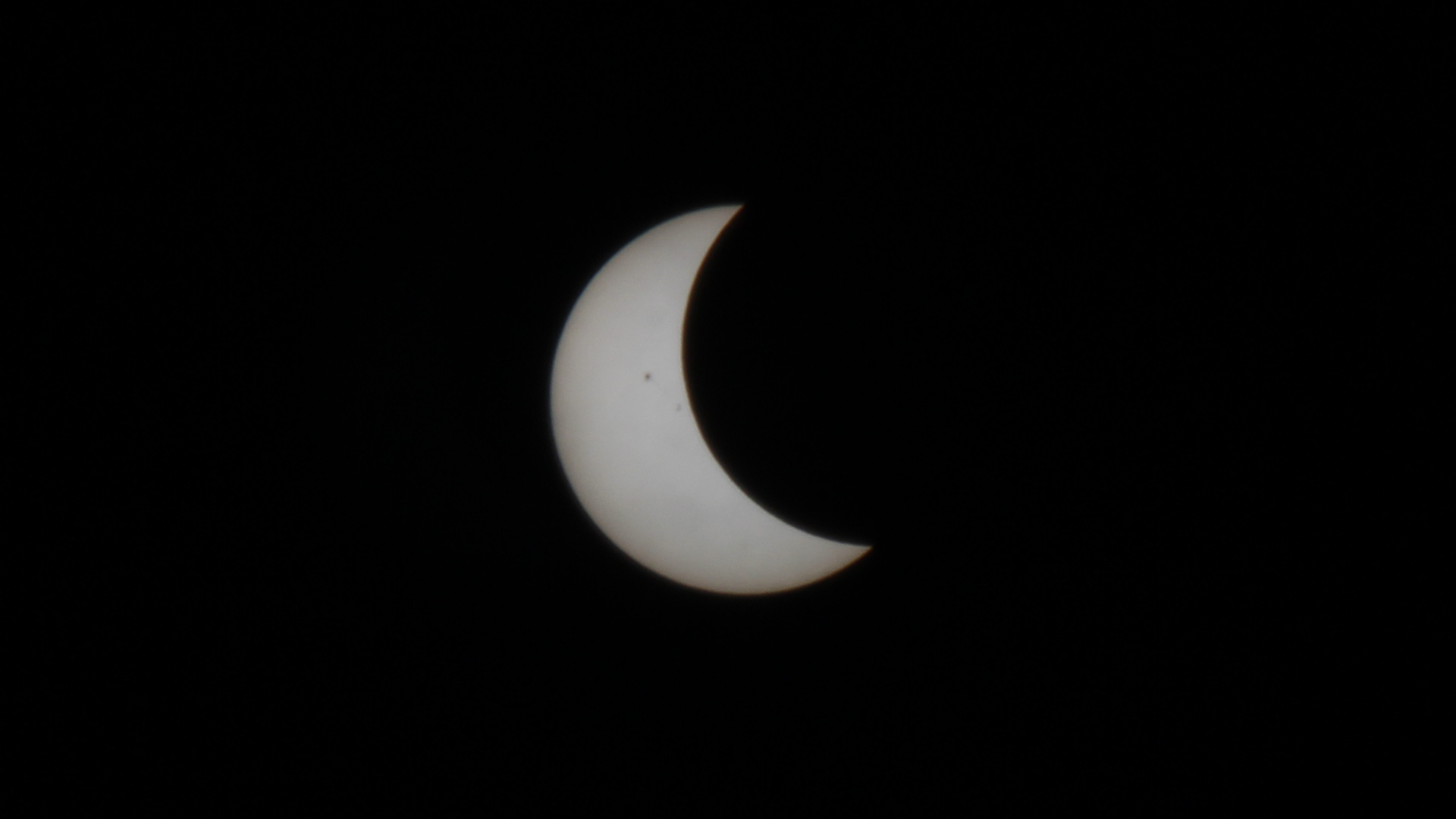
From Magetan, Indonesia, 3:51 UTC

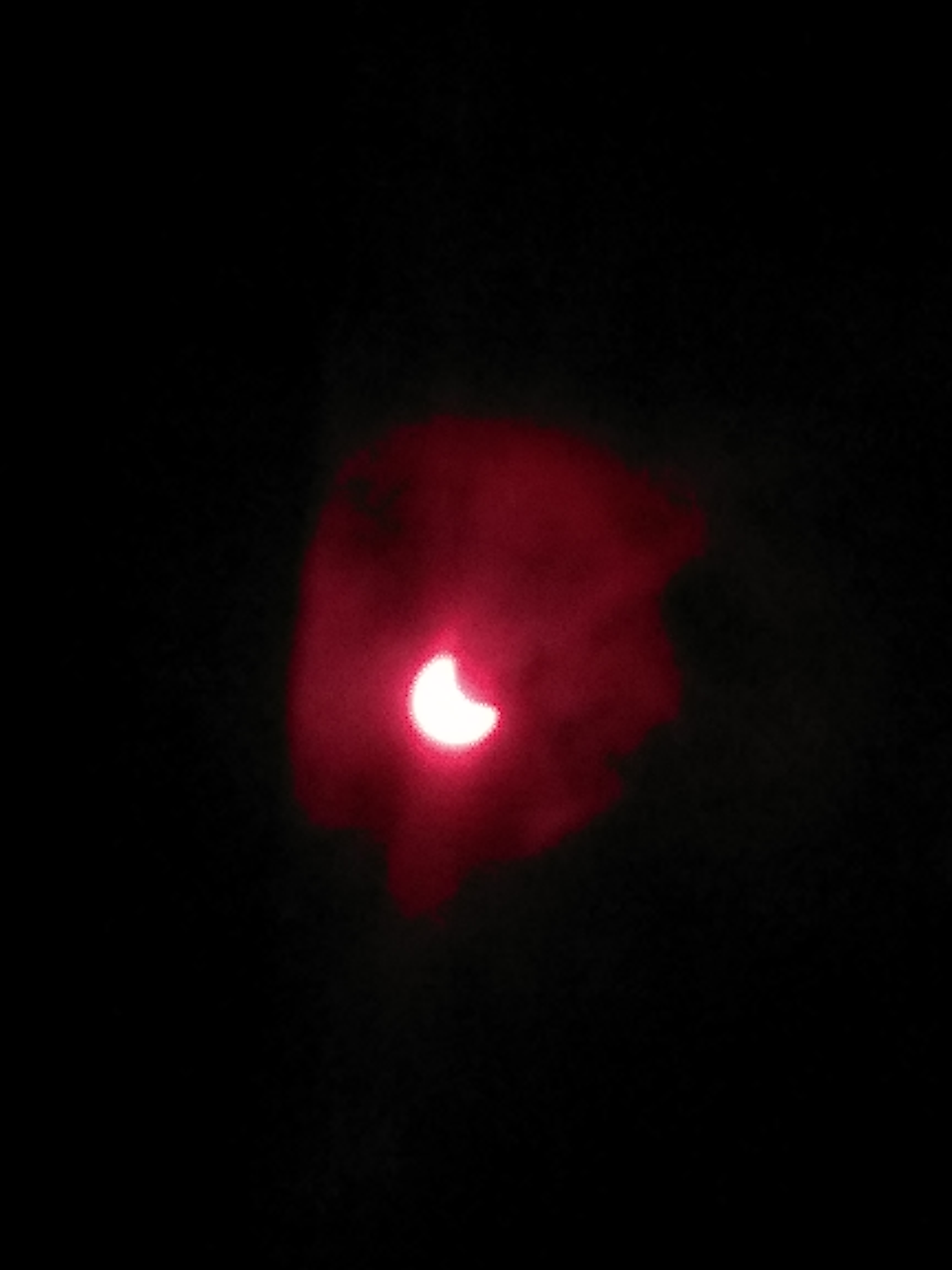
From Palangka Raya, Indonesia, 4:02 UTC

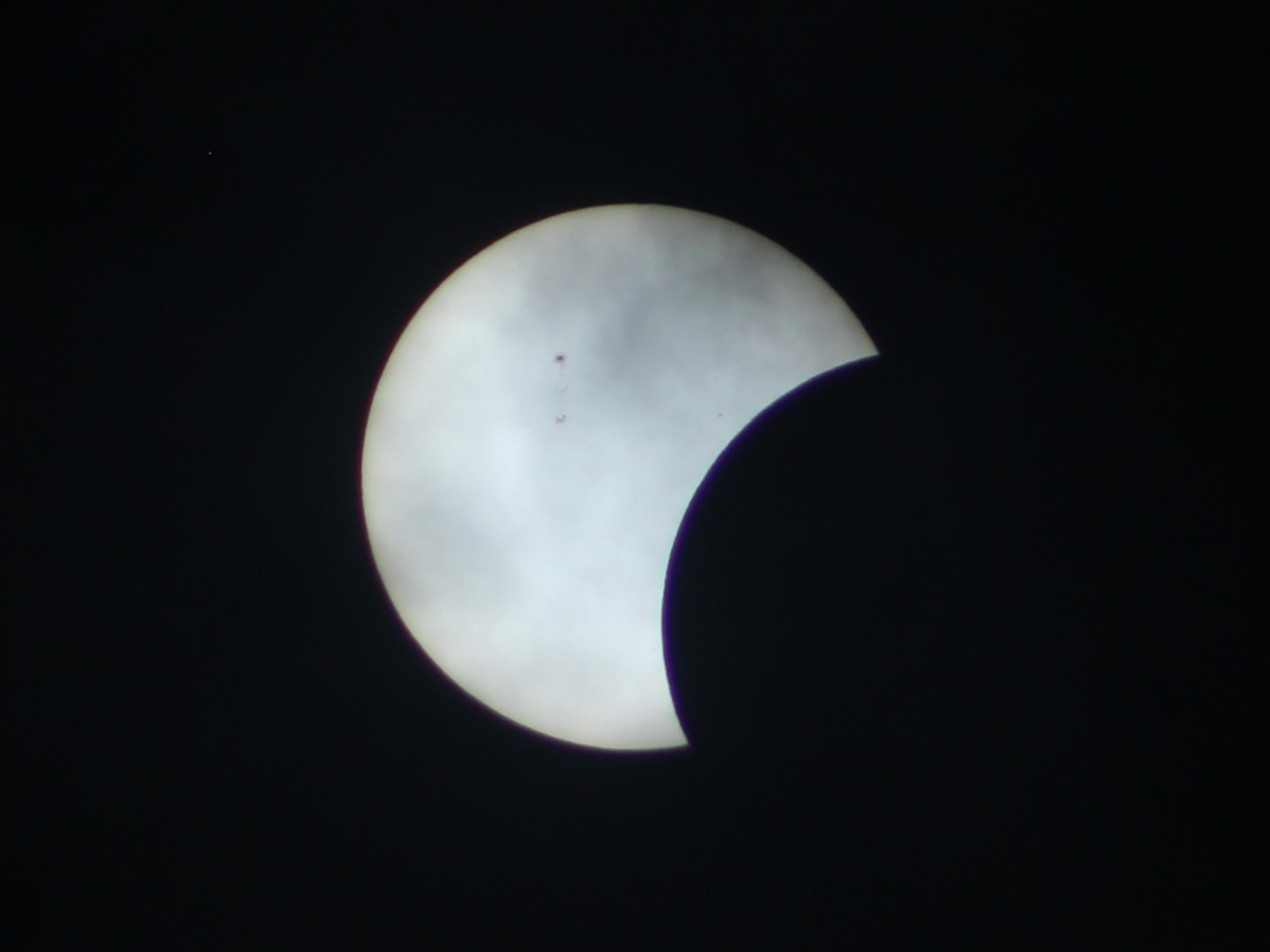
From Pangkalpinang, Indonesia, 4:05 UTC

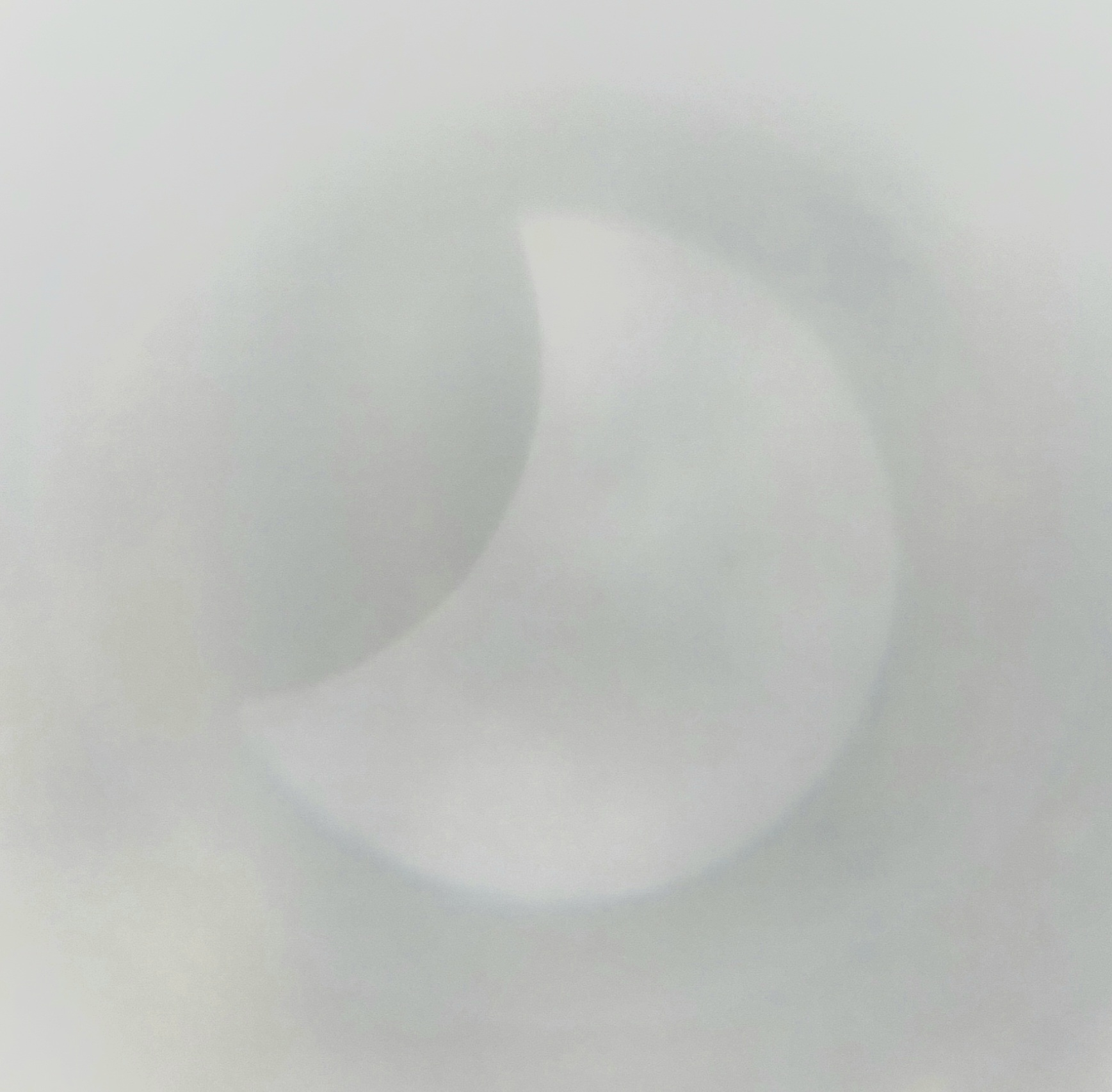
From Kuching, Malaysia, 4:13 UTC

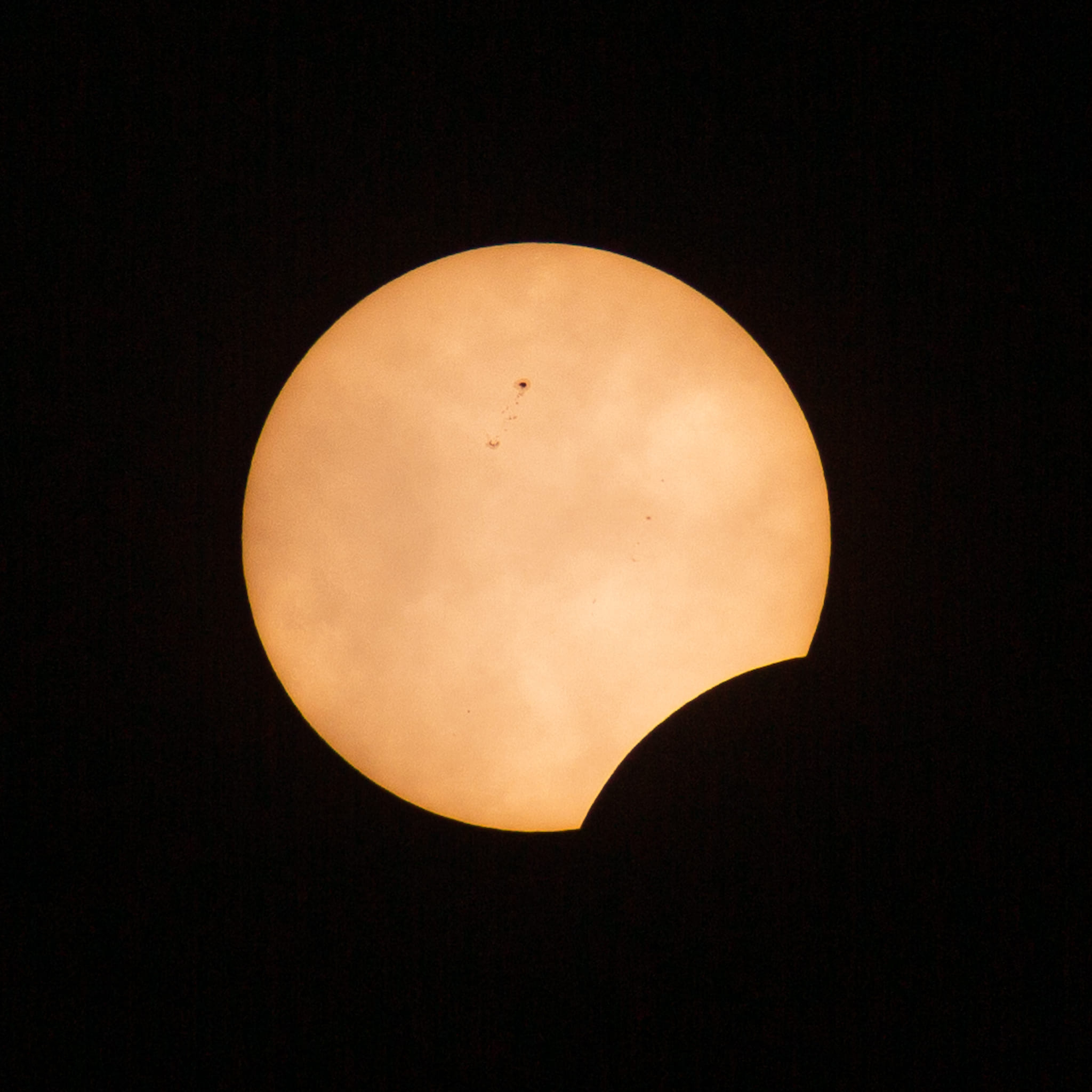
From Ho Chi Minh City, Vietnam, 4:21 UTC

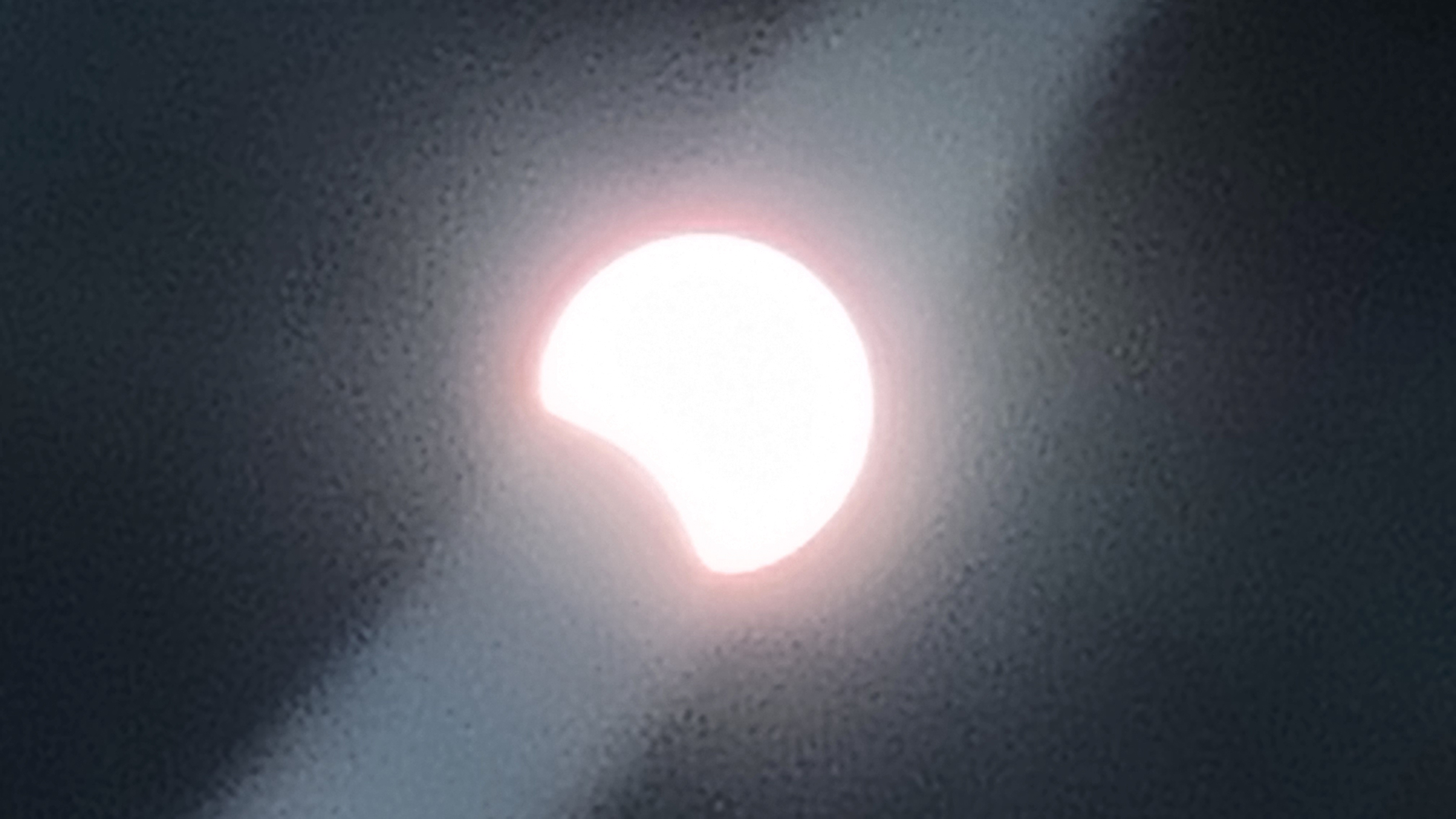
From San Fernando, Philippines, 4:50 UTC

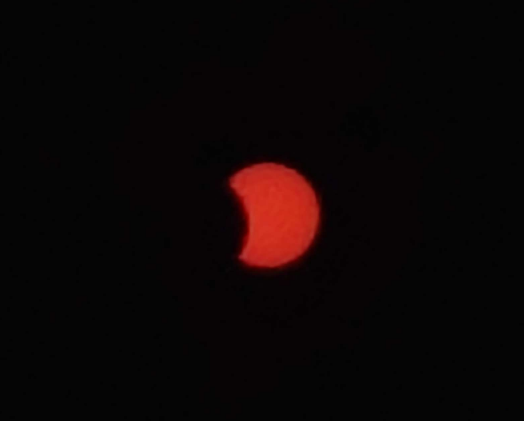
From Magalang, Philippines, 4:55 UTC

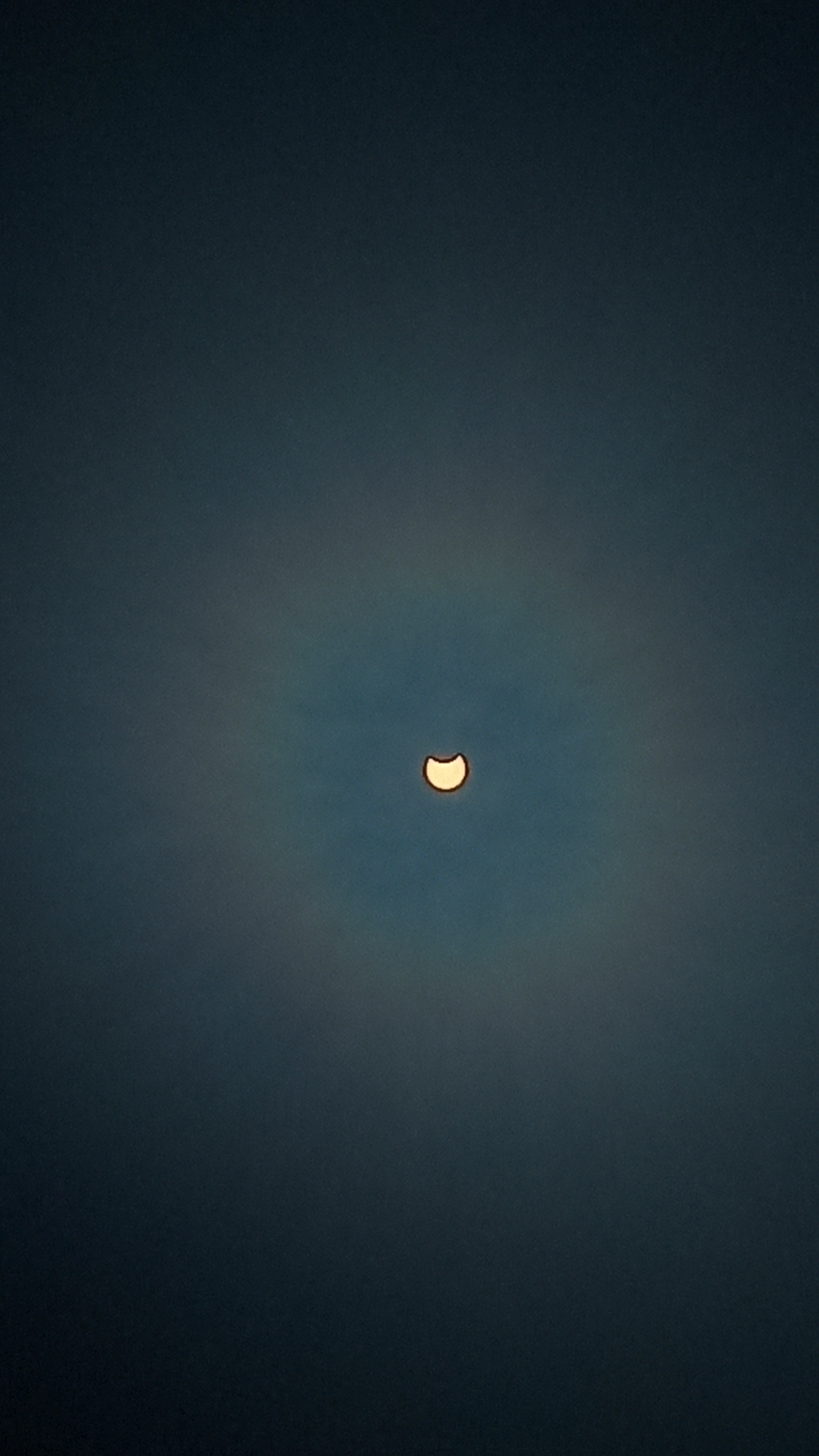
From San Jose del Monte, Philippines, 4:55 UTC

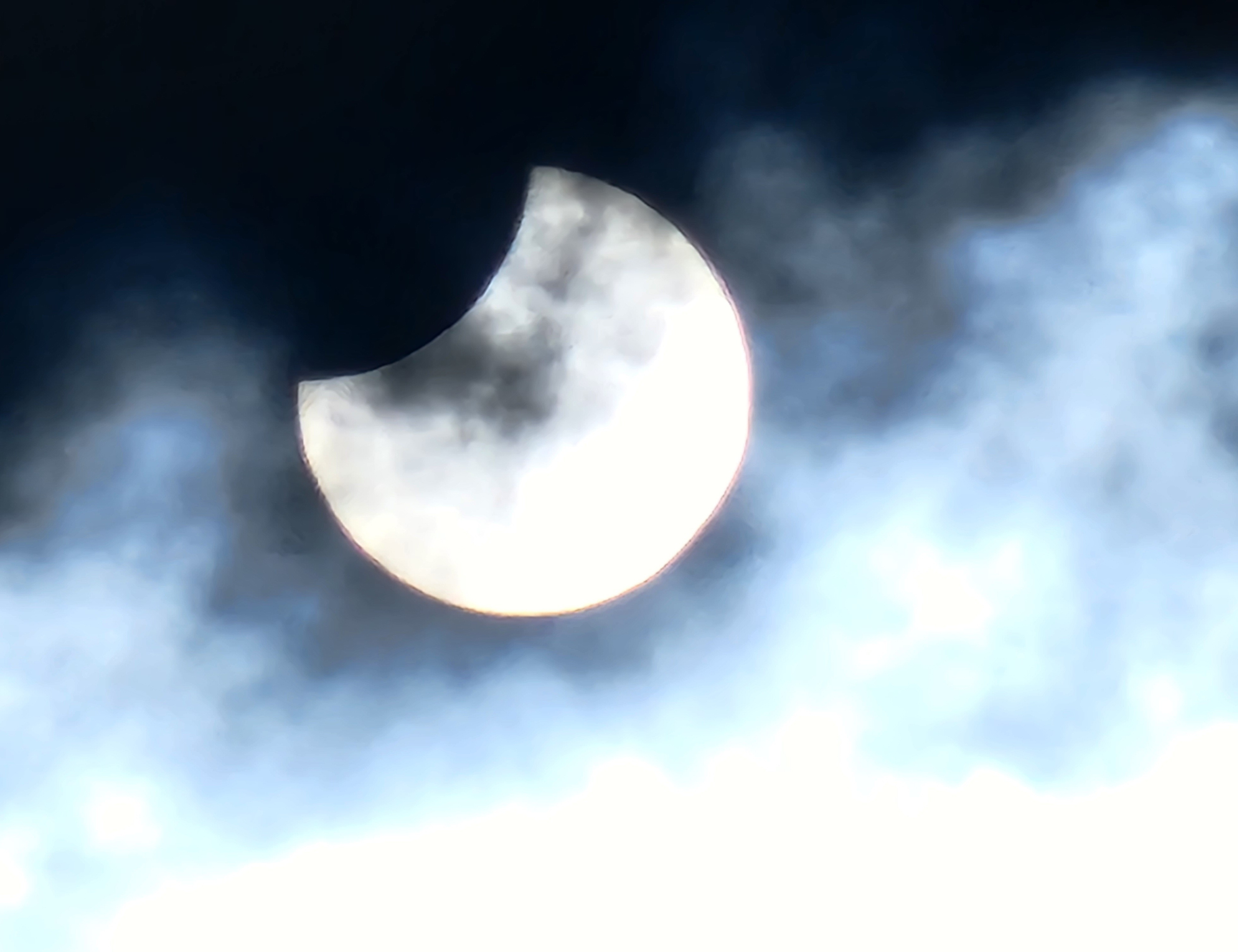
From Quezon City, Philippines, 5:20 UTC

== Eclipse details ==
Shown below are two tables displaying details about this particular solar eclipse. The first table outlines times at which the Moon's penumbra or umbra attains the specific parameter, and the second table describes various other parameters pertaining to this eclipse.

April 20, 2023 Solar Eclipse Times
Event	Time (UTC)
First Penumbral External Contact	2023 April 20 at 01:35:34.3 UTC
First Umbral External Contact	2023 April 20 at 02:38:15.0 UTC
First Central Line	2023 April 20 at 02:38:18.4 UTC
First Umbral Internal Contact	2023 April 20 at 02:38:21.7 UTC
First Penumbral Internal Contact	2023 April 20 at 03:54:32.2 UTC
Equatorial Conjunction	2023 April 20 at 03:56:44.7 UTC
Ecliptic Conjunction	2023 April 20 at 04:13:41.1 UTC
Greatest Duration	2023 April 20 at 04:17:26.8 UTC
Greatest Eclipse	2023 April 20 at 04:17:56.0 UTC
Last Penumbral Internal Contact	2023 April 20 at 04:41:47.9 UTC
Last Umbral Internal Contact	2023 April 20 at 05:57:41.3 UTC
Last Central Line	2023 April 20 at 05:57:47.4 UTC
Last Umbral External Contact	2023 April 20 at 05:57:53.5 UTC
Last Penumbral External Contact	2023 April 20 at 07:00:31.9 UTC

April 20, 2023 Solar Eclipse Parameters
Parameter	Value
Eclipse Magnitude	1.01320
Eclipse Obscuration	1.02657
Gamma	−0.39515
Sun Right Ascension	01h51m01.7s
Sun Declination	+11°24'54.1"
Sun Semi-Diameter	15'55.4"
Sun Equatorial Horizontal Parallax	08.8"
Moon Right Ascension	01h51m43.2s
Moon Declination	+11°04'16.7"
Moon Semi-Diameter	15'53.6"
Moon Equatorial Horizontal Parallax	0°58'19.9"
ΔT	71.1 s

== Eclipse season ==
This eclipse is part of an eclipse season, a period, roughly every six months, when eclipses occur. Only two (or occasionally three) eclipse seasons occur each year, and each season lasts about 35 days and repeats just short of six months (173 days) later; thus two full eclipse seasons always occur each year. Either two or three eclipses happen each eclipse season. In the sequence below, each eclipse is separated by a fortnight.

Eclipse season of April–May 2023
April 20 Ascending node (new moon)	May 5 Descending node (full moon)
Hybrid solar eclipse Solar Saros 129	Penumbral lunar eclipse Lunar Saros 141

== Related eclipses ==
=== Eclipses in 2023 ===
- A hybrid solar eclipse on April 20.
- A penumbral lunar eclipse on May 5.
- An annular solar eclipse on October 14.
- A partial lunar eclipse on October 28.

=== Metonic ===
- Preceded by: Solar eclipse of July 2, 2019
- Followed by: Solar eclipse of February 6, 2027

=== Tzolkinex ===
- Preceded by: Solar eclipse of March 9, 2016
- Followed by: Solar eclipse of June 1, 2030

=== Half-Saros ===
- Preceded by: Lunar eclipse of April 15, 2014
- Followed by: Lunar eclipse of April 25, 2032

=== Tritos ===
- Preceded by: Solar eclipse of May 20–21, 2012
- Followed by: Solar eclipse of March 20, 2034

=== Solar Saros 129 ===
- Preceded by: Solar eclipse of April 8, 2005
- Followed by: Solar eclipse of April 30, 2041

=== Inex ===
- Preceded by: Solar eclipse of May 10, 1994
- Followed by: Solar eclipse of March 30, 2052

=== Triad ===
- Preceded by: Solar eclipse of June 19, 1936
- Followed by: Solar eclipse of February 18, 2110

=== Solar eclipses of 2022–2025 ===
Solar eclipse series sets from 2022 to 2025
Ascending node			Descending node		
Saros	Map	Gamma	Saros	Map	Gamma
119 Partial in CTIO, Chile	April 30, 2022 Partial	−1.19008	124 Partial from Saratov, Russia	October 25, 2022 Partial	1.07014
129 Totality from Exmouth, WA	April 20, 2023 Hybrid	−0.39515	134 Mexican Hat, UT	October 14, 2023 Annular	0.37534
139 Totality in Dallas, TX	April 8, 2024 Total	0.34314	144 Tres Cerros, Argentina	October 2, 2024 Annular	−0.35087
149 Partial from Halifax, NS	March 29, 2025 Partial	1.04053	154	September 21, 2025 Partial	−1.06509

=== Saros 129 ===
This eclipse is a part of Saros series 129, repeating every 18 years, 11 days, and containing 80 events. The series started with a partial solar eclipse on October 3, 1103. It contains annular eclipses from May 6, 1464 through March 18, 1969; hybrid eclipses from March 29, 1987 through April 20, 2023; and total eclipses from April 30, 2041 through July 26, 2185. The series ends at member 80 as a partial eclipse on February 21, 2528. Its eclipses are tabulated in three columns; every third eclipse in the same column is one exeligmos apart, so they all cast shadows over approximately the same parts of the Earth.

The longest duration of annularity was produced by member 34 at 5 minutes, 10 seconds on October 4, 1698, and the longest duration of totality will be produced by member 58 at 3 minutes, 43 seconds on June 25, 2131. All eclipses in this series occur at the Moon’s ascending node of orbit.

Series members 40–61 occur between 1801 and 2200:
40	41	42
December 10, 1806	December 20, 1824	December 31, 1842
43	44	45
January 11, 1861	January 22, 1879	February 1, 1897
46	47	48
February 14, 1915	February 24, 1933	March 7, 1951
49	50	51
March 18, 1969	March 29, 1987	April 8, 2005
52	53	54
April 20, 2023	April 30, 2041	May 11, 2059
55	56	57
May 22, 2077	June 2, 2095	June 13, 2113
58	59	60
June 25, 2131	July 5, 2149	July 16, 2167
61
July 26, 2185

=== Metonic series ===
The metonic series repeats eclipses every 19 years (6939.69 days), lasting about 5 cycles. Eclipses occur in nearly the same calendar date. In addition, the octon subseries repeats 1/5 of that or every 3.8 years (1387.94 days). All eclipses in this table occur at the Moon's ascending node.

21 eclipse events between July 1, 2000 and July 1, 2076
July 1–2	April 19–20	February 5–7	November 24–25	September 12–13
117	119	121	123	125
July 1, 2000	April 19, 2004	February 7, 2008	November 25, 2011	September 13, 2015
127	129	131	133	135
July 2, 2019	April 20, 2023	February 6, 2027	November 25, 2030	September 12, 2034
137	139	141	143	145
July 2, 2038	April 20, 2042	February 5, 2046	November 25, 2049	September 12, 2053
147	149	151	153	155
July 1, 2057	April 20, 2061	February 5, 2065	November 24, 2068	September 12, 2072
157
July 1, 2076

=== Tritos series ===
This eclipse is a part of a tritos cycle, repeating at alternating nodes every 135 synodic months (≈ 3986.63 days, or 11 years minus 1 month). Their appearance and longitude are irregular due to a lack of synchronization with the anomalistic month (period of perigee), but groupings of 3 tritos cycles (≈ 33 years minus 3 months) come close (≈ 434.044 anomalistic months), so eclipses are similar in these groupings.

Series members between 1801 and 2200
January 1, 1805 (Saros 109)		October 31, 1826 (Saros 111)		August 28, 1848 (Saros 113)
July 29, 1859 (Saros 114)	June 28, 1870 (Saros 115)	May 27, 1881 (Saros 116)	April 26, 1892 (Saros 117)	March 29, 1903 (Saros 118)
February 25, 1914 (Saros 119)	January 24, 1925 (Saros 120)	December 25, 1935 (Saros 121)	November 23, 1946 (Saros 122)	October 23, 1957 (Saros 123)
September 22, 1968 (Saros 124)	August 22, 1979 (Saros 125)	July 22, 1990 (Saros 126)	June 21, 2001 (Saros 127)	May 20, 2012 (Saros 128)
April 20, 2023 (Saros 129)	March 20, 2034 (Saros 130)	February 16, 2045 (Saros 131)	January 16, 2056 (Saros 132)	December 17, 2066 (Saros 133)
November 15, 2077 (Saros 134)	October 14, 2088 (Saros 135)	September 14, 2099 (Saros 136)	August 15, 2110 (Saros 137)	July 14, 2121 (Saros 138)
June 13, 2132 (Saros 139)	May 14, 2143 (Saros 140)	April 12, 2154 (Saros 141)	March 12, 2165 (Saros 142)	February 10, 2176 (Saros 143)
January 9, 2187 (Saros 144)	December 9, 2197 (Saros 145)			

=== Inex series ===
This eclipse is a part of the long period inex cycle, repeating at alternating nodes, every 358 synodic months (≈ 10,571.95 days, or 29 years minus 20 days). Their appearance and longitude are irregular due to a lack of synchronization with the anomalistic month (period of perigee). However, groupings of 3 inex cycles (≈ 87 years minus 2 months) comes close (≈ 1,151.02 anomalistic months), so eclipses are similar in these groupings.

Series members between 1801 and 2200
September 7, 1820 (Saros 122)	August 18, 1849 (Saros 123)	July 29, 1878 (Saros 124)
July 10, 1907 (Saros 125)	June 19, 1936 (Saros 126)	May 30, 1965 (Saros 127)
May 10, 1994 (Saros 128)	April 20, 2023 (Saros 129)	March 30, 2052 (Saros 130)
March 10, 2081 (Saros 131)	February 18, 2110 (Saros 132)	January 30, 2139 (Saros 133)
January 10, 2168 (Saros 134)	December 19, 2196 (Saros 135)	
