= Solar eclipse of February 16, 2045 =

Future annular solar eclipse

- Annular eclipse
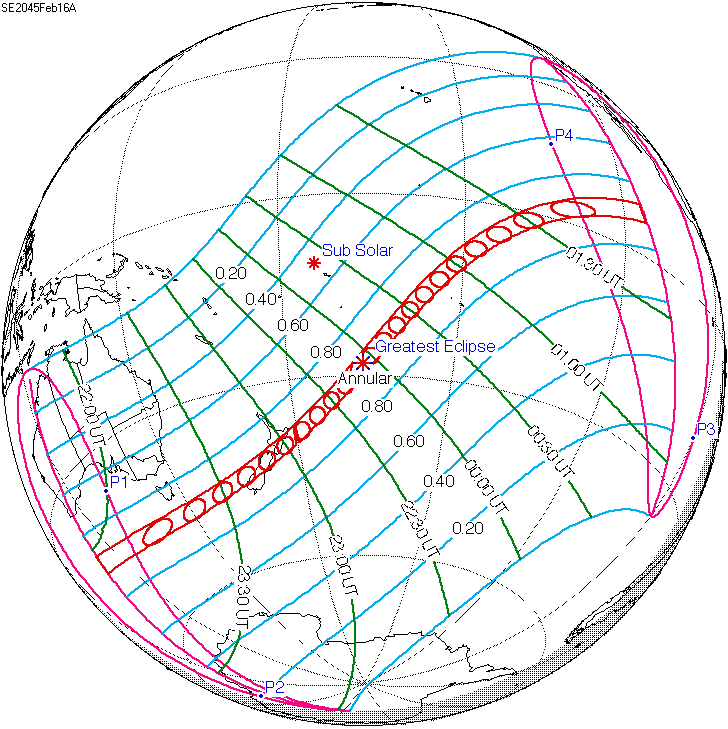
- Map
- Gamma: −0.3125
- Magnitude: 0.9285

Maximum eclipse
- Duration: 467 s (7 min 47 s)
- Coordinates: 28.3°S 166.2°W
- Max. width of band: 281 km (175 mi)

Times (UTC)
- Greatest eclipse: 23:56:07

References
- Saros: 131 (52 of 70)
- Catalog # (SE5000): 9607

An annular solar eclipse will occur at the Moon's ascending node of orbit on Thursday, February 16, 2045, with a magnitude of 0.9285. A solar eclipse occurs when the Moon passes between Earth and the Sun, thereby totally or partly obscuring the image of the Sun for a viewer on Earth. An annular solar eclipse occurs when the Moon's apparent diameter is smaller than the Sun's, blocking most of the Sun's light and causing the Sun to look like an annulus (ring). An annular eclipse appears as a partial eclipse over a region of the Earth thousands of kilometres wide. Occurring about 2.8 days after apogee (on February 14, 2045, at 3:00 UTC), the Moon's apparent diameter will be smaller.

The path of annularity will be visible from parts of New Zealand, the Cook Islands, French Polynesia, and Kiribati. A partial solar eclipse will be visible for parts of Australia, Antarctica, Oceania, Hawaii, and southwestern North America.

== Images ==
Animated path

== Eclipse timing ==
=== Places experiencing annular eclipse ===
Solar Eclipse of February 16, 2045 (Local Times)
Country or territory	City or place	Start of partial eclipse	Start of annular eclipse	Maximum eclipse	End of annular eclipse	End of partial eclipse	Duration of annularity (min:s)	Duration of eclipse (hr:min)	Maximum coverage
New Zealand	Greymouth (Note: The times listed for this location occur on February 17, 2045, local time.)	10:15:50	11:44:37	11:48:15	11:51:52	13:26:47	7:15	3:11	85.50%
New Zealand	Christchurch	10:17:39	11:48:13	11:49:56	11:51:39	13:27:42	3:26	3:10	85.81%
New Zealand	Richmond	10:18:17	11:49:09	11:52:25	11:55:42	13:32:03	6:33	3:14	85.87%
New Zealand	Nelson	10:18:25	11:49:25	11:52:39	11:55:53	13:32:20	6:28	3:14	85.88%
New Zealand	Blenheim	10:19:16	11:49:56	11:53:39	11:57:21	13:33:11	7:25	3:14	85.89%
New Zealand	Wellington	10:20:22	11:51:32	11:55:17	11:59:02	13:35:01	7:30	3:15	85.91%
New Zealand	Paraparaumu	10:20:44	11:52:24	11:56:01	11:59:40	13:36:03	7:16	3:15	85.92%
New Zealand	Whanganui	10:21:02	11:55:43	11:57:02	11:58:22	13:37:47	2:39	3:17	85.95%
New Zealand	Palmerston North	10:21:41	11:54:19	11:57:40	12:00:59	13:38:06	6:40	3:16	85.95%
New Zealand	Napier	10:23:48	11:58:07	12:00:59	12:03:51	13:42:01	5:44	3:18	86.00%
New Zealand	Gisborne	10:25:48	12:02:02	12:04:03	12:06:03	13:45:33	4:01	3:20	86.04%
Cook Islands	Rarotonga	12:36:46	14:20:06	14:23:50	14:27:34	15:58:38	7:28	3:22	86.27%
Cook Islands	Aitutaki	12:42:35	14:29:34	14:29:46	14:30:00	16:04:02	0:26	3:21	86.26%

=== Places experiencing partial eclipse ===
Solar Eclipse of February 16, 2045 (Local Times)
Country or territory	City or place	Start of partial eclipse	Maximum eclipse	End of partial eclipse	Duration of eclipse (hr:min)	Maximum coverage
Australia	Perth	05:56:06 (sunrise)	05:58:55	07:01:10	1:05	51.79%
Australia	Melbourne	07:55:39	09:10:58	10:36:52	2:41	60.65%
Australia	Sydney	08:00:21	09:18:00	10:46:59	2:47	48.48%
Australia	Brisbane	07:09:21	08:22:29	09:46:24	2:37	29.14%
Antarctica	Casey Station	05:33:08	06:27:21	07:23:54	1:51	29.77%
Antarctica	Dumont d'Urville Station	07:30:39	08:31:41	09:35:29	2:05	33.08%
Norfolk Island	Kingston	09:22:24	10:54:38	12:34:33	3:12	45.51%
New Zealand	Auckland	10:22:09	11:59:50	13:42:19	3:20	78.15%
New Caledonia	Nouméa	08:36:52	10:01:11	11:32:09	2:55	24.91%
Vanuatu	Port Vila	08:56:07	10:16:19	11:40:08	2:44	16.65%
Fiji	Suva	10:06:51	11:45:55	13:21:33	3:15	34.33%
Tonga	Nuku'alofa	11:06:51	12:53:51	14:34:21	3:28	55.21%
Niue	Alofi	11:22:05	13:10:45	14:49:27	3:27	63.30%
Wallis and Futuna	Mata Utu	10:32:16	12:12:55	13:45:11	3:13	35.87%
Tuvalu	Funafuti	10:50:12	12:15:07	13:34:01	2:44	16.97%
Samoa	Apia	11:36:03	13:21:01	14:55:29	3:19	47.51%
American Samoa	Pago Pago	11:36:04	13:21:58	14:57:00	3:21	51.08%
Tokelau	Fakaofo	11:53:33	13:34:11	15:03:42	3:10	39.77%
French Polynesia	Papeete	13:08:46	14:48:13	16:14:14	3:05	75.42%
United States Minor Outlying Islands	Baker Island	11:36:17	12:48:39	13:54:28	2:18	11.47%
Pitcairn Islands	Adamstown	15:42:01	16:53:15	17:56:41	2:15	29.10%
Chile	Easter Island	19:16:58	20:00:48	20:41:36	1:25	9.79%
Mexico	Cabo San Lucas	17:53:48	18:14:28	18:16:52 (sunset)	0:23	14.83%
Kiribati	Kiritimati	13:48:29	15:20:26	16:39:52	2:51	48.55%
Clipperton Island	Clipperton Island	16:41:24	17:23:15	17:25:28 (sunset)	0:4	48.09%
Mexico	Tijuana	17:10:29	17:32:38	17:35:16 (sunset)	0:25	8.76%
United States	Los Angeles	17:14:26	17:35:41	17:38:21 (sunset)	0:24	6.89%
United States	Honolulu	14:58:25	15:46:24	16:30:46	1:32	6.80%
United States	San Francisco	17:28:46	17:47:32	17:50:23 (sunset)	0:22	2.36%

== Eclipse details ==
Shown below are two tables displaying details about this particular solar eclipse. The first table outlines times at which the Moon's penumbra or umbra attains the specific parameter, and the second table describes various other parameters pertaining to this eclipse.

February 16, 2045 Solar Eclipse Times
Event	Time (UTC)
First Penumbral External Contact	2045 February 16 at 20:54:17.1 UTC
First Umbral External Contact	2045 February 16 at 22:00:55.6 UTC
First Central Line	2045 February 16 at 22:04:06.6 UTC
First Umbral Internal Contact	2045 February 16 at 22:07:18.0 UTC
First Penumbral Internal Contact	2045 February 16 at 23:22:03.4 UTC
Equatorial Conjunction	2045 February 16 at 23:38:01.6 UTC
Greatest Duration	2045 February 16 at 23:38:37.2 UTC
Ecliptic Conjunction	2045 February 16 at 23:52:22.4 UTC
Greatest Eclipse	2045 February 16 at 23:56:06.6 UTC
Last Penumbral Internal Contact	2045 February 17 at 00:30:36.9 UTC
Last Umbral Internal Contact	2045 February 17 at 01:45:08.0 UTC
Last Central Line	2045 February 17 at 01:48:17.4 UTC
Last Umbral External Contact	2045 February 17 at 01:51:26.3 UTC
Last Penumbral External Contact	2045 February 17 at 02:57:59.4 UTC

February 16, 2045 Solar Eclipse Parameters
Parameter	Value
Eclipse Magnitude	0.92847
Eclipse Obscuration	0.86205
Gamma	−0.31254
Sun Right Ascension	22h03m27.1s
Sun Declination	-11°55'04.8"
Sun Semi-Diameter	16'11.2"
Sun Equatorial Horizontal Parallax	08.9"
Moon Right Ascension	22h03m57.6s
Moon Declination	-12°10'17.7"
Moon Semi-Diameter	14'48.9"
Moon Equatorial Horizontal Parallax	0°54'22.2"
ΔT	81.3 s

== Eclipse season ==
This eclipse is part of an eclipse season, a period, roughly every six months, when eclipses occur. Only two (or occasionally three) eclipse seasons occur each year, and each season lasts about 35 days and repeats just short of six months (173 days) later; thus two full eclipse seasons always occur each year. Either two or three eclipses happen each eclipse season. In the sequence below, each eclipse is separated by a fortnight.

Eclipse season of February–March 2045
February 16 Ascending node (new moon)	March 3 Descending node (full moon)
Annular solar eclipse Solar Saros 131	Penumbral lunar eclipse Lunar Saros 143

== Related eclipses ==
=== Eclipses in 2045 ===
- An annular solar eclipse on February 16.
- A penumbral lunar eclipse on March 3.
- A total solar eclipse on August 12.
- A penumbral lunar eclipse on August 27.

=== Metonic ===
- Preceded by: Solar eclipse of April 30, 2041
- Followed by: Solar eclipse of December 5, 2048

=== Tzolkinex ===
- Preceded by: Solar eclipse of January 5, 2038
- Followed by: Solar eclipse of March 30, 2052

=== Half-Saros ===
- Preceded by: Lunar eclipse of February 11, 2036
- Followed by: Lunar eclipse of February 22, 2054

=== Tritos ===
- Preceded by: Solar eclipse of March 20, 2034
- Followed by: Solar eclipse of January 16, 2056

=== Solar Saros 131 ===
- Preceded by: Solar eclipse of February 6, 2027
- Followed by: Solar eclipse of February 28, 2063

=== Inex ===
- Preceded by: Solar eclipse of March 9, 2016
- Followed by: Solar eclipse of January 27, 2074

=== Triad ===
- Preceded by: Solar eclipse of April 19, 1958
- Followed by: Solar eclipse of December 19, 2131

=== Solar eclipses of 2044–2047 ===
This eclipse is a member of a semester series. An eclipse in a semester series of solar eclipses repeats approximately every 177 days and 4 hours (a semester) at alternating nodes of the Moon's orbit.

The partial solar eclipses on June 23, 2047 and December 16, 2047 occur in the next lunar year eclipse set.

Solar eclipse series sets from 2044 to 2047
Ascending node			Descending node		
Saros	Map	Gamma	Saros	Map	Gamma
121	February 28, 2044 Annular	−0.9954	126	August 23, 2044 Total	0.9613
131	February 16, 2045 Annular	−0.3125	136	August 12, 2045 Total	0.2116
141	February 5, 2046 Annular	0.3765	146	August 2, 2046 Total	−0.535
151	January 26, 2047 Partial	1.045	156	July 22, 2047 Partial	−1.3477

=== Saros 131 ===
This eclipse is a part of Saros series 131, repeating every 18 years, 11 days, and containing 70 events. The series started with a partial solar eclipse on August 1, 1125. It contains total eclipses from March 27, 1522 through May 30, 1612; hybrid eclipses from June 10, 1630 through July 24, 1702; and annular eclipses from August 4, 1720 through June 18, 2243. The series ends at member 70 as a partial eclipse on September 2, 2369. Its eclipses are tabulated in three columns; every third eclipse in the same column is one exeligmos apart, so they all cast shadows over approximately the same parts of the Earth.

The longest duration of totality was produced by member 28 at 58 seconds on May 30, 1612, and the longest duration of annularity was produced by member 50 at 7 minutes, 54 seconds on January 26, 2009. All eclipses in this series occur at the Moon’s ascending node of orbit.

Series members 39–60 occur between 1801 and 2200:
39	40	41
September 28, 1810	October 9, 1828	October 20, 1846
42	43	44
October 30, 1864	November 10, 1882	November 22, 1900
45	46	47
December 3, 1918	December 13, 1936	December 25, 1954
48	49	50
January 4, 1973	January 15, 1991	January 26, 2009
51	52	53
February 6, 2027	February 16, 2045	February 28, 2063
54	55	56
March 10, 2081	March 21, 2099	April 2, 2117
57	58	59
April 13, 2135	April 23, 2153	May 5, 2171
60
May 15, 2189

=== Metonic series ===
The metonic series repeats eclipses every 19 years (6939.69 days), lasting about 5 cycles. Eclipses occur in nearly the same calendar date. In addition, the octon subseries repeats 1/5 of that or every 3.8 years (1387.94 days). All eclipses in this table occur at the Moon's ascending node.

21 eclipse events between July 13, 2018 and July 12, 2094
July 12–13	April 30–May 1	February 16–17	December 5–6	September 22–23
117	119	121	123	125
July 13, 2018	April 30, 2022	February 17, 2026	December 5, 2029	September 23, 2033
127	129	131	133	135
July 13, 2037	April 30, 2041	February 16, 2045	December 5, 2048	September 22, 2052
137	139	141	143	145
July 12, 2056	April 30, 2060	February 17, 2064	December 6, 2067	September 23, 2071
147	149	151	153	155
July 13, 2075	May 1, 2079	February 16, 2083	December 6, 2086	September 23, 2090
157
July 12, 2094

=== Tritos series ===
This eclipse is a part of a tritos cycle, repeating at alternating nodes every 135 synodic months (≈ 3986.63 days, or 11 years minus 1 month). Their appearance and longitude are irregular due to a lack of synchronization with the anomalistic month (period of perigee), but groupings of 3 tritos cycles (≈ 33 years minus 3 months) come close (≈ 434.044 anomalistic months), so eclipses are similar in these groupings.

Series members between 1801 and 2200
January 1, 1805 (Saros 109)		October 31, 1826 (Saros 111)		August 28, 1848 (Saros 113)
July 29, 1859 (Saros 114)	June 28, 1870 (Saros 115)	May 27, 1881 (Saros 116)	April 26, 1892 (Saros 117)	March 29, 1903 (Saros 118)
February 25, 1914 (Saros 119)	January 24, 1925 (Saros 120)	December 25, 1935 (Saros 121)	November 23, 1946 (Saros 122)	October 23, 1957 (Saros 123)
September 22, 1968 (Saros 124)	August 22, 1979 (Saros 125)	July 22, 1990 (Saros 126)	June 21, 2001 (Saros 127)	May 20, 2012 (Saros 128)
April 20, 2023 (Saros 129)	March 20, 2034 (Saros 130)	February 16, 2045 (Saros 131)	January 16, 2056 (Saros 132)	December 17, 2066 (Saros 133)
November 15, 2077 (Saros 134)	October 14, 2088 (Saros 135)	September 14, 2099 (Saros 136)	August 15, 2110 (Saros 137)	July 14, 2121 (Saros 138)
June 13, 2132 (Saros 139)	May 14, 2143 (Saros 140)	April 12, 2154 (Saros 141)	March 12, 2165 (Saros 142)	February 10, 2176 (Saros 143)
January 9, 2187 (Saros 144)	December 9, 2197 (Saros 145)			

=== Inex series ===
This eclipse is a part of the long period inex cycle, repeating at alternating nodes, every 358 synodic months (≈ 10,571.95 days, or 29 years minus 20 days). Their appearance and longitude are irregular due to a lack of synchronization with the anomalistic month (period of perigee). However, groupings of 3 inex cycles (≈ 87 years minus 2 months) comes close (≈ 1,151.02 anomalistic months), so eclipses are similar in these groupings.

Series members between 1801 and 2200
July 27, 1813 (Saros 123)	July 8, 1842 (Saros 124)	June 18, 1871 (Saros 125)
May 28, 1900 (Saros 126)	May 9, 1929 (Saros 127)	April 19, 1958 (Saros 128)
March 29, 1987 (Saros 129)	March 9, 2016 (Saros 130)	February 16, 2045 (Saros 131)
January 27, 2074 (Saros 132)	January 8, 2103 (Saros 133)	December 19, 2131 (Saros 134)
November 27, 2160 (Saros 135)	November 8, 2189 (Saros 136)	
