= Solar eclipse of March 18, 1969 =

20th-century annular solar eclipse

- Annular eclipse
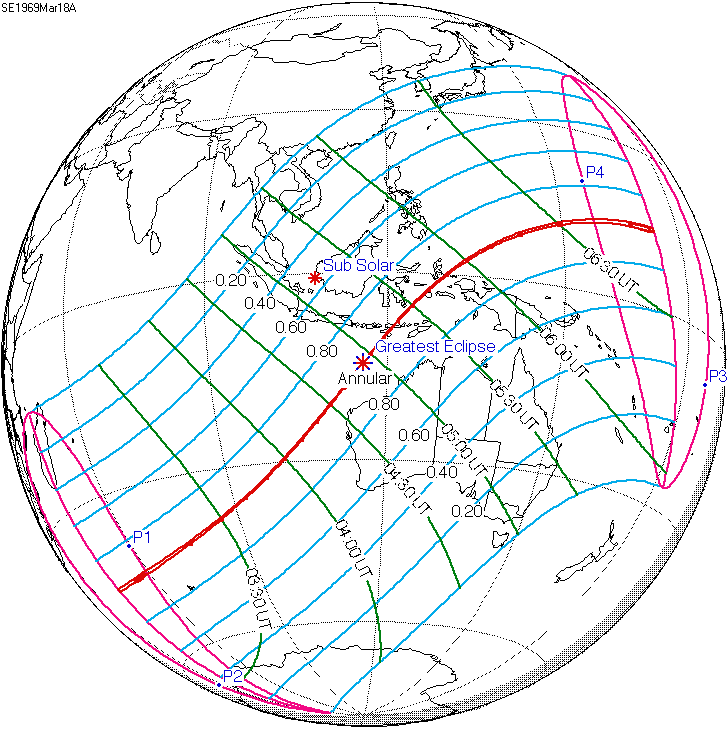
- Map
- Gamma: −0.2704
- Magnitude: 0.9954

Maximum eclipse
- Duration: 26 s (0 min 26 s)
- Coordinates: 14.8°S 116.3°E
- Max. width of band: 16 km (9.9 mi)

Times (UTC)
- Greatest eclipse: 4:54:57

References
- Saros: 129 (49 of 80)
- Catalog # (SE5000): 9440

An annular solar eclipse occurred at the Moon's ascending node of orbit on Tuesday, March 18, 1969, with a magnitude of 0.9954. A solar eclipse occurs when the Moon passes between Earth and the Sun, thereby totally or partly obscuring the image of the Sun for a viewer on Earth. An annular solar eclipse occurs when the Moon's apparent diameter is smaller than the Sun's, blocking most of the Sun's light and causing the Sun to look like an annulus (ring). An annular eclipse appears as a partial eclipse over a region of the Earth thousands of kilometres wide. The Moon's apparent diameter was near the average diameter because it occurred 5.1 days after perigee (on March 13, 1969, at 2:50 UTC) and 7.7 days before apogee (on March 25, 1969, at 19:30 UTC).

Annularity was visible from part of Indonesia, and two atolls (Faraulep and Gaferut) in the Trust Territory of the Pacific Islands which belongs to the Federated States of Micronesia now. A partial eclipse was visible for parts of the Malagasy Republic (today's Madagascar), Antarctica, Australia, Southeast Asia, East Asia, and northern Oceania.

== Eclipse details ==
Shown below are two tables displaying details about this particular solar eclipse. The first table outlines times at which the Moon's penumbra or umbra attains the specific parameter, and the second table describes various other parameters pertaining to this eclipse.

March 18, 1969 Solar Eclipse Times
Event	Time (UTC)
First Penumbral External Contact	1969 March 18 at 02:07:06.0 UTC
First Umbral External Contact	1969 March 18 at 03:08:38.9 UTC
First Central Line	1969 March 18 at 03:09:16.7 UTC
Greatest Duration	1969 March 18 at 03:09:16.7 UTC
First Umbral Internal Contact	1969 March 18 at 03:09:54.5 UTC
First Penumbral Internal Contact	1969 March 18 at 04:16:02.5 UTC
Equatorial Conjunction	1969 March 18 at 04:38:24.3 UTC
Ecliptic Conjunction	1969 March 18 at 04:51:59.7 UTC
Greatest Eclipse	1969 March 18 at 04:54:57.2 UTC
Last Penumbral Internal Contact	1969 March 18 at 05:34:13.5 UTC
Last Umbral Internal Contact	1969 March 18 at 06:40:08.1 UTC
Last Central Line	1969 March 18 at 06:40:48.6 UTC
Last Umbral External Contact	1969 March 18 at 06:41:29.2 UTC
Last Penumbral External Contact	1969 March 18 at 07:43:01.1 UTC

March 18, 1969 Solar Eclipse Parameters
Parameter	Value
Eclipse Magnitude	0.99545
Eclipse Obscuration	0.99092
Gamma	−0.27037
Sun Right Ascension	23h50m32.4s
Sun Declination	-01°01'31.8"
Sun Semi-Diameter	16'04.0"
Sun Equatorial Horizontal Parallax	08.8"
Moon Right Ascension	23h51m02.7s
Moon Declination	-01°15'08.8"
Moon Semi-Diameter	15'44.8"
Moon Equatorial Horizontal Parallax	0°57'47.6"
ΔT	39.4 s

== Eclipse season ==
This eclipse is part of an eclipse season, a period, roughly every six months, when eclipses occur. Only two (or occasionally three) eclipse seasons occur each year, and each season lasts about 35 days and repeats just short of six months (173 days) later; thus two full eclipse seasons always occur each year. Either two or three eclipses happen each eclipse season. In the sequence below, each eclipse is separated by a fortnight.

Eclipse season of March–April 1969
March 18 Ascending node (new moon)	April 2 Descending node (full moon)
Annular solar eclipse Solar Saros 129	Penumbral lunar eclipse Lunar Saros 141

== Related eclipses ==
=== Eclipses in 1969 ===
- An annular solar eclipse on March 18.
- A penumbral lunar eclipse on April 2.
- A penumbral lunar eclipse on August 27.
- An annular solar eclipse on September 11.
- A penumbral lunar eclipse on September 25.

=== Metonic ===
- Preceded by: Solar eclipse of May 30, 1965
- Followed by: Solar eclipse of January 4, 1973

=== Tzolkinex ===
- Preceded by: Solar eclipse of February 5, 1962
- Followed by: Solar eclipse of April 29, 1976

=== Half-Saros ===
- Preceded by: Lunar eclipse of March 13, 1960
- Followed by: Lunar eclipse of March 24, 1978

=== Tritos ===
- Preceded by: Solar eclipse of April 19, 1958
- Followed by: Solar eclipse of February 16, 1980

=== Solar Saros 129 ===
- Preceded by: Solar eclipse of March 7, 1951
- Followed by: Solar eclipse of March 29, 1987

=== Inex ===
- Preceded by: Solar eclipse of April 7, 1940
- Followed by: Solar eclipse of February 26, 1998

=== Triad ===
- Preceded by: Solar eclipse of May 17, 1882
- Followed by: Solar eclipse of January 16, 2056

=== Solar eclipses of 1968–1971 ===
This eclipse is a member of a semester series. An eclipse in a semester series of solar eclipses repeats approximately every 177 days and 4 hours (a semester) at alternating nodes of the Moon's orbit.

The partial solar eclipse on July 22, 1971 occurs in the next lunar year eclipse set.

Solar eclipse series sets from 1968 to 1971
Ascending node			Descending node		
Saros	Map	Gamma	Saros	Map	Gamma
119	March 28, 1968 Partial	−1.037	124	September 22, 1968 Total	0.9451
129	March 18, 1969 Annular	−0.2704	134	September 11, 1969 Annular	0.2201
139 Totality in Williamston, NC; USA	March 7, 1970 Total	0.4473	144	August 31, 1970 Annular	−0.5364
149	February 25, 1971 Partial	1.1188	154	August 20, 1971 Partial	−1.2659

=== Saros 129 ===
This eclipse is a part of Saros series 129, repeating every 18 years, 11 days, and containing 80 events. The series started with a partial solar eclipse on October 3, 1103. It contains annular eclipses from May 6, 1464 through March 18, 1969; hybrid eclipses from March 29, 1987 through April 20, 2023; and total eclipses from April 30, 2041 through July 26, 2185. The series ends at member 80 as a partial eclipse on February 21, 2528. Its eclipses are tabulated in three columns; every third eclipse in the same column is one exeligmos apart, so they all cast shadows over approximately the same parts of the Earth.

The longest duration of annularity was produced by member 34 at 5 minutes, 10 seconds on October 4, 1698, and the longest duration of totality will be produced by member 58 at 3 minutes, 43 seconds on June 25, 2131. All eclipses in this series occur at the Moon’s ascending node of orbit.

Series members 40–61 occur between 1801 and 2200:
40	41	42
December 10, 1806	December 20, 1824	December 31, 1842
43	44	45
January 11, 1861	January 22, 1879	February 1, 1897
46	47	48
February 14, 1915	February 24, 1933	March 7, 1951
49	50	51
March 18, 1969	March 29, 1987	April 8, 2005
52	53	54
April 20, 2023	April 30, 2041	May 11, 2059
55	56	57
May 22, 2077	June 2, 2095	June 13, 2113
58	59	60
June 25, 2131	July 5, 2149	July 16, 2167
61
July 26, 2185

=== Metonic series ===
The metonic series repeats eclipses every 19 years (6939.69 days), lasting about 5 cycles. Eclipses occur in nearly the same calendar date. In addition, the octon subseries repeats 1/5 of that or every 3.8 years (1387.94 days). All eclipses in this table occur at the Moon's ascending node.

22 eclipse events between January 5, 1935 and August 11, 2018
January 4–5	October 23–24	August 10–12	May 30–31	March 18–19
111	113	115	117	119
January 5, 1935		August 12, 1942	May 30, 1946	March 18, 1950
121	123	125	127	129
January 5, 1954	October 23, 1957	August 11, 1961	May 30, 1965	March 18, 1969
131	133	135	137	139
January 4, 1973	October 23, 1976	August 10, 1980	May 30, 1984	March 18, 1988
141	143	145	147	149
January 4, 1992	October 24, 1995	August 11, 1999	May 31, 2003	March 19, 2007
151	153	155		
January 4, 2011	October 23, 2014	August 11, 2018		

=== Tritos series ===
This eclipse is a part of a tritos cycle, repeating at alternating nodes every 135 synodic months (≈ 3986.63 days, or 11 years minus 1 month). Their appearance and longitude are irregular due to a lack of synchronization with the anomalistic month (period of perigee), but groupings of 3 tritos cycles (≈ 33 years minus 3 months) come close (≈ 434.044 anomalistic months), so eclipses are similar in these groupings.

Series members between 1801 and 2200
June 26, 1805 (Saros 114)	May 27, 1816 (Saros 115)	April 26, 1827 (Saros 116)	March 25, 1838 (Saros 117)	February 23, 1849 (Saros 118)
January 23, 1860 (Saros 119)	December 22, 1870 (Saros 120)	November 21, 1881 (Saros 121)	October 20, 1892 (Saros 122)	September 21, 1903 (Saros 123)
August 21, 1914 (Saros 124)	July 20, 1925 (Saros 125)	June 19, 1936 (Saros 126)	May 20, 1947 (Saros 127)	April 19, 1958 (Saros 128)
March 18, 1969 (Saros 129)	February 16, 1980 (Saros 130)	January 15, 1991 (Saros 131)	December 14, 2001 (Saros 132)	November 13, 2012 (Saros 133)
October 14, 2023 (Saros 134)	September 12, 2034 (Saros 135)	August 12, 2045 (Saros 136)	July 12, 2056 (Saros 137)	June 11, 2067 (Saros 138)
May 11, 2078 (Saros 139)	April 10, 2089 (Saros 140)	March 10, 2100 (Saros 141)	February 8, 2111 (Saros 142)	January 8, 2122 (Saros 143)
December 7, 2132 (Saros 144)	November 7, 2143 (Saros 145)	October 7, 2154 (Saros 146)	September 5, 2165 (Saros 147)	August 4, 2176 (Saros 148)
July 6, 2187 (Saros 149)	June 4, 2198 (Saros 150)			

=== Inex series ===
This eclipse is a part of the long period inex cycle, repeating at alternating nodes, every 358 synodic months (≈ 10,571.95 days, or 29 years minus 20 days). Their appearance and longitude are irregular due to a lack of synchronization with the anomalistic month (period of perigee). However, groupings of 3 inex cycles (≈ 87 years minus 2 months) comes close (≈ 1,151.02 anomalistic months), so eclipses are similar in these groupings.

Series members between 1801 and 2200
June 26, 1824 (Saros 124)	June 6, 1853 (Saros 125)	May 17, 1882 (Saros 126)
April 28, 1911 (Saros 127)	April 7, 1940 (Saros 128)	March 18, 1969 (Saros 129)
February 26, 1998 (Saros 130)	February 6, 2027 (Saros 131)	January 16, 2056 (Saros 132)
December 27, 2084 (Saros 133)	December 8, 2113 (Saros 134)	November 17, 2142 (Saros 135)
October 29, 2171 (Saros 136)	October 9, 2200 (Saros 137)	
