= Solar eclipse of September 22, 1968 =

Total eclipse

- Total eclipse
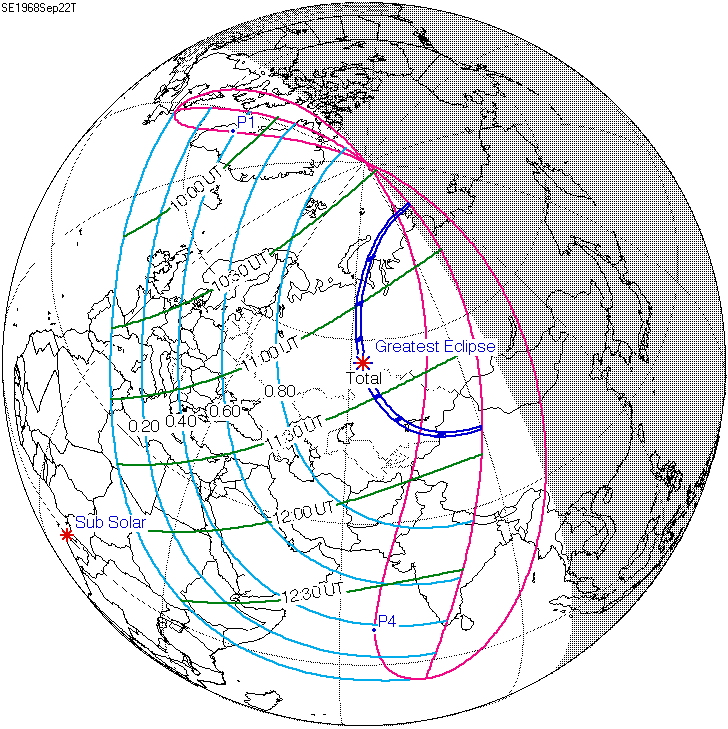
- Map
- Gamma: 0.9451
- Magnitude: 1.0099

Maximum eclipse
- Duration: 40 s (0 min 40 s)
- Coordinates: 56.2°N 64°E
- Max. width of band: 104 km (65 mi)

Times (UTC)
- Greatest eclipse: 11:18:46

References
- Saros: 124 (52 of 73)
- Catalog # (SE5000): 9439

A total solar eclipse occurred at the Moon's descending node of orbit on Sunday, September 22, 1968, with a magnitude of 1.0099. A solar eclipse occurs when the Moon passes between Earth and the Sun, thereby totally or partly obscuring the image of the Sun for a viewer on Earth. A total solar eclipse occurs when the Moon's apparent diameter is larger than the Sun's, blocking all direct sunlight, turning day into darkness. Totality occurs in a narrow path across Earth's surface, with the partial solar eclipse visible over a surrounding region thousands of kilometres wide. Occurring about 3.4 days before perigee (on September 25, 1968, at 21:20 UTC), the Moon's apparent diameter was larger.

Totality was visible from the Soviet Union (today's Russia and Kazakhstan) and Xinjiang in Northwestern China. A partial eclipse was visible for parts of Europe, Northeast Africa, West Asia, Central Asia, and South Asia.

== Observation ==
=== Soviet Union ===
A company named Opton proposed to the Sternberg Astronomical Institute to observe this solar eclipse in Sary Shagan on the west bank of Lake Balkhash, and also wrote to the Soviet Ministry of Railways for help to get to the destination faster. The observation team obtained spectrum of the corona. Students also assisted in taking pictures of the corona with MTO-1000 lens.

=== China ===
This is the first total solar eclipse visible in the country since the founding of the People's Republic of China. It occurred during the Cultural Revolution, when astronomers including Zhang Yuzhe who organized observations of the total solar eclipse of June 19, 1936 and September 21, 1941 were excluded from key positions. The Chinese Academy of Sciences sent a team of 200 including Zhang Kuisan (张魁三), the then deputy director of the Geophysics Bureau to Xinjiang. The observation was code-named "532", named after the time February 1953 when Mao Zedong visited the Purple Mountain Observatory in Nanjing. The travel to Ürümqi by train first took 3 days, and another 7 days by car to the optical observation site Zhaosu Town (Mongolküre Town), Zhaosu County and the radio observation site Kashgar. Gravity measurements were also conducted in mountain caves. In order to avoid the turmoil of the Cultural Revolution, Zhou Enlai sent Liu Xiyao to lead the army to the local area and provide the whole team with meals and accommodation. The observation team completed the first monochromatic light observation and high-resolution radio observation of the sun in China. This was also the first time in China that a solar eclipse was observed by plane. Shanghai Scientific and Educational Film Studio also produced a science and education film of the total solar eclipse.

The Soviet Union and China were the only two countries the path of this total solar eclipse passed. Due to the Sino-Soviet split, the two countries did not conduct any joint observations. About half a year after the eclipse, on January 23, 1969, the People's Daily published an article claiming that the observation of this eclipse "achieved brilliant results", repeatedly criticized the Soviet Union of "obstructing" it, and also mentioned that the Soviet Union "plundered data" of the annular solar eclipse of April 19, 1958.

== Eclipse details ==
Shown below are two tables displaying details about this particular solar eclipse. The first table outlines times at which the Moon's penumbra or umbra attains the specific parameter, and the second table describes various other parameters pertaining to this eclipse.

September 22, 1968 Solar Eclipse Times
Event	Time (UTC)
First Penumbral External Contact	1968 September 22 at 09:07:22.9 UTC
Equatorial Conjunction	1968 September 22 at 10:22:09.4 UTC
First Umbral External Contact	1968 September 22 at 10:44:14.2 UTC
First Central Line	1968 September 22 at 10:44:37.1 UTC
First Umbral Internal Contact	1968 September 22 at 10:45:00.3 UTC
Ecliptic Conjunction	1968 September 22 at 11:08:44.2 UTC
Greatest Eclipse	1968 September 22 at 11:18:46.0 UTC
Greatest Duration	1968 September 22 at 11:20:13.7 UTC
Last Umbral Internal Contact	1968 September 22 at 11:53:04.0 UTC
Last Central Line	1968 September 22 at 11:53:29.7 UTC
Last Umbral External Contact	1968 September 22 at 11:53:55.1 UTC
Last Penumbral External Contact	1968 September 22 at 13:30:26.7 UTC

September 22, 1968 Solar Eclipse Parameters
Parameter	Value
Eclipse Magnitude	1.00990
Eclipse Obscuration	1.01989
Gamma	0.94507
Sun Right Ascension	11h58m11.0s
Sun Declination	+00°11'49.6"
Sun Semi-Diameter	15'56.3"
Sun Equatorial Horizontal Parallax	08.8"
Moon Right Ascension	11h59m58.7s
Moon Declination	+01°00'16.0"
Moon Semi-Diameter	16'01.1"
Moon Equatorial Horizontal Parallax	0°58'47.3"
ΔT	38.9 s

== Eclipse season ==
This eclipse is part of an eclipse season, a period, roughly every six months, when eclipses occur. Only two (or occasionally three) eclipse seasons occur each year, and each season lasts about 35 days and repeats just short of six months (173 days) later; thus two full eclipse seasons always occur each year. Either two or three eclipses happen each eclipse season. In the sequence below, each eclipse is separated by a fortnight.

Eclipse season of September–October 1968
September 22 Descending node (new moon)	October 6 Ascending node (full moon)
Total solar eclipse Solar Saros 124	Total lunar eclipse Lunar Saros 136

== Related eclipses ==
=== Eclipses in 1968 ===
- A partial solar eclipse on March 28.
- A total lunar eclipse on April 13.
- A total solar eclipse on September 22.
- A total lunar eclipse on October 6.

=== Metonic ===
- Preceded by: Solar eclipse of December 4, 1964
- Followed by: Solar eclipse of July 10, 1972

=== Tzolkinex ===
- Preceded by: Solar eclipse of August 11, 1961
- Followed by: Solar eclipse of November 3, 1975

=== Half-Saros ===
- Preceded by: Lunar eclipse of September 17, 1959
- Followed by: Lunar eclipse of September 27, 1977

=== Tritos ===
- Preceded by: Solar eclipse of October 23, 1957
- Followed by: Solar eclipse of August 22, 1979

=== Solar Saros 124 ===
- Preceded by: Solar eclipse of September 12, 1950
- Followed by: Solar eclipse of October 3, 1986

=== Inex ===
- Preceded by: Solar eclipse of October 12, 1939
- Followed by: Solar eclipse of September 2, 1997

=== Triad ===
- Preceded by: Solar eclipse of November 21, 1881
- Followed by: Solar eclipse of July 24, 2055

=== Solar eclipses of 1968–1971 ===
This eclipse is a member of a semester series. An eclipse in a semester series of solar eclipses repeats approximately every 177 days and 4 hours (a semester) at alternating nodes of the Moon's orbit.

The partial solar eclipse on July 22, 1971 occurs in the next lunar year eclipse set.

Solar eclipse series sets from 1968 to 1971
Ascending node			Descending node		
Saros	Map	Gamma	Saros	Map	Gamma
119	March 28, 1968 Partial	−1.037	124	September 22, 1968 Total	0.9451
129	March 18, 1969 Annular	−0.2704	134	September 11, 1969 Annular	0.2201
139 Totality in Williamston, NC; USA	March 7, 1970 Total	0.4473	144	August 31, 1970 Annular	−0.5364
149	February 25, 1971 Partial	1.1188	154	August 20, 1971 Partial	−1.2659

=== Saros 124 ===
This eclipse is a part of Saros series 124, repeating every 18 years, 11 days, and containing 73 events. The series started with a partial solar eclipse on March 6, 1049. It contains total eclipses from June 12, 1211 through September 22, 1968, and a hybrid eclipse on October 3, 1986. There are no annular eclipses in this set. The series ends at member 73 as a partial eclipse on May 11, 2347. Its eclipses are tabulated in three columns; every third eclipse in the same column is one exeligmos apart, so they all cast shadows over approximately the same parts of the Earth.

The longest duration of totality was produced by member 39 at 5 minutes, 46 seconds on May 3, 1734. All eclipses in this series occur at the Moon’s descending node of orbit.

Series members 43–64 occur between 1801 and 2200:
43	44	45
June 16, 1806	June 26, 1824	July 8, 1842
46	47	48
July 18, 1860	July 29, 1878	August 9, 1896
49	50	51
August 21, 1914	August 31, 1932	September 12, 1950
52	53	54
September 22, 1968	October 3, 1986	October 14, 2004
55	56	57
October 25, 2022	November 4, 2040	November 16, 2058
58	59	60
November 26, 2076	December 7, 2094	December 19, 2112
61	62	63
December 30, 2130	January 9, 2149	January 21, 2167
64
January 31, 2185

=== Metonic series ===
The metonic series repeats eclipses every 19 years (6939.69 days), lasting about 5 cycles. Eclipses occur in nearly the same calendar date. In addition, the octon subseries repeats 1/5 of that or every 3.8 years (1387.94 days). All eclipses in this table occur at the Moon's descending node.

21 eclipse events between July 11, 1953 and July 11, 2029
July 10–11	April 29–30	February 15–16	December 4	September 21–23
116	118	120	122	124
July 11, 1953	April 30, 1957	February 15, 1961	December 4, 1964	September 22, 1968
126	128	130	132	134
July 10, 1972	April 29, 1976	February 16, 1980	December 4, 1983	September 23, 1987
136	138	140	142	144
July 11, 1991	April 29, 1995	February 16, 1999	December 4, 2002	September 22, 2006
146	148	150	152	154
July 11, 2010	April 29, 2014	February 15, 2018	December 4, 2021	September 21, 2025
156
July 11, 2029

=== Tritos series ===
This eclipse is a part of a tritos cycle, repeating at alternating nodes every 135 synodic months (≈ 3986.63 days, or 11 years minus 1 month). Their appearance and longitude are irregular due to a lack of synchronization with the anomalistic month (period of perigee), but groupings of 3 tritos cycles (≈ 33 years minus 3 months) come close (≈ 434.044 anomalistic months), so eclipses are similar in these groupings.

Series members between 1801 and 2200
January 1, 1805 (Saros 109)		October 31, 1826 (Saros 111)		August 28, 1848 (Saros 113)
July 29, 1859 (Saros 114)	June 28, 1870 (Saros 115)	May 27, 1881 (Saros 116)	April 26, 1892 (Saros 117)	March 29, 1903 (Saros 118)
February 25, 1914 (Saros 119)	January 24, 1925 (Saros 120)	December 25, 1935 (Saros 121)	November 23, 1946 (Saros 122)	October 23, 1957 (Saros 123)
September 22, 1968 (Saros 124)	August 22, 1979 (Saros 125)	July 22, 1990 (Saros 126)	June 21, 2001 (Saros 127)	May 20, 2012 (Saros 128)
April 20, 2023 (Saros 129)	March 20, 2034 (Saros 130)	February 16, 2045 (Saros 131)	January 16, 2056 (Saros 132)	December 17, 2066 (Saros 133)
November 15, 2077 (Saros 134)	October 14, 2088 (Saros 135)	September 14, 2099 (Saros 136)	August 15, 2110 (Saros 137)	July 14, 2121 (Saros 138)
June 13, 2132 (Saros 139)	May 14, 2143 (Saros 140)	April 12, 2154 (Saros 141)	March 12, 2165 (Saros 142)	February 10, 2176 (Saros 143)
January 9, 2187 (Saros 144)	December 9, 2197 (Saros 145)			

=== Inex series ===
This eclipse is a part of the long period inex cycle, repeating at alternating nodes, every 358 synodic months (≈ 10,571.95 days, or 29 years minus 20 days). Their appearance and longitude are irregular due to a lack of synchronization with the anomalistic month (period of perigee). However, groupings of 3 inex cycles (≈ 87 years minus 2 months) comes close (≈ 1,151.02 anomalistic months), so eclipses are similar in these groupings.

Series members between 1801 and 2200
January 1, 1824 (Saros 119)	December 11, 1852 (Saros 120)	November 21, 1881 (Saros 121)
November 2, 1910 (Saros 122)	October 12, 1939 (Saros 123)	September 22, 1968 (Saros 124)
September 2, 1997 (Saros 125)	August 12, 2026 (Saros 126)	July 24, 2055 (Saros 127)
July 3, 2084 (Saros 128)	June 13, 2113 (Saros 129)	May 25, 2142 (Saros 130)
May 5, 2171 (Saros 131)	April 14, 2200 (Saros 132)	
