= Solar eclipse of April 30, 2041 =

Total eclipse

- Total eclipse
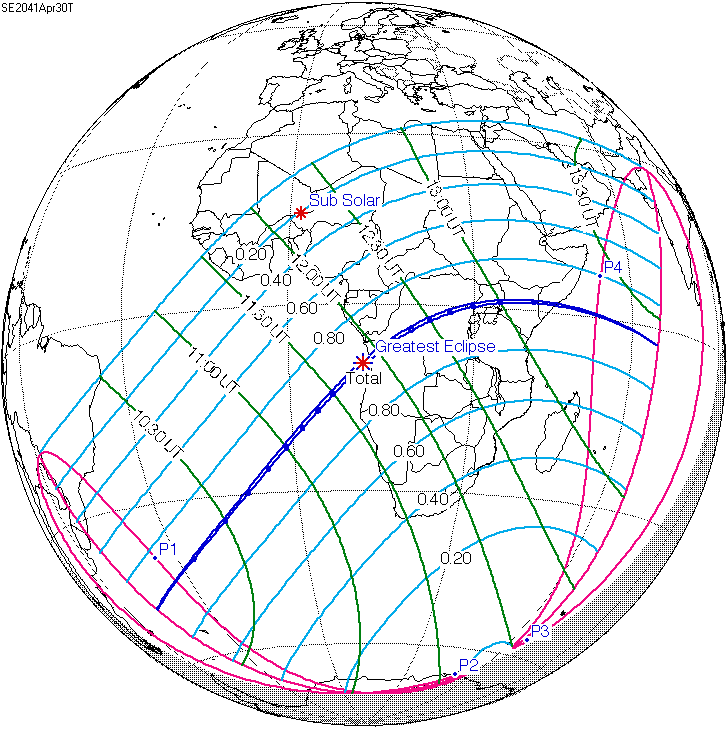
- Map
- Gamma: −0.4492
- Magnitude: 1.0189

Maximum eclipse
- Duration: 111 s (1 min 51 s)
- Coordinates: 9.6°S 12.2°E
- Max. width of band: 72 km (45 mi)

Times (UTC)
- Greatest eclipse: 11:52:21

References
- Saros: 129 (53 of 80)
- Catalog # (SE5000): 9599

A total solar eclipse will occur at the Moon's ascending node of orbit on Tuesday, April 30, 2041, with a magnitude of 1.0189. A solar eclipse occurs when the Moon passes between Earth and the Sun, thereby totally or partly obscuring the image of the Sun for a viewer on Earth. A total solar eclipse occurs when the Moon's apparent diameter is larger than the Sun's, blocking all direct sunlight, turning day into darkness. Totality occurs in a narrow path across Earth's surface, with the partial solar eclipse visible over a surrounding region thousands of kilometres wide. Occurring about 3.75 days after perigee (on April 26, 2041, at 17:50 UTC), the Moon's apparent diameter will be larger.

== Path description ==
The path of totality will begin in the South Atlantic Ocean before making landfall at Luanda, the capital of Angola. From there, the path will cross the Democratic Republic of the Congo, Uganda (where totality will be visible in the northern portions of the capital Kampala), Kenya, and Somalia. The path will then exit Africa and end over the Indian Ocean.

A partial solar eclipse will also be visible over much of eastern South America, Africa, Antarctica, the Middle East, and South Asia.

== Images ==
Animated path

== Eclipse timing ==
=== Places experiencing total eclipse ===
Solar Eclipse of April 30, 2041 (Local Times)
Country or territory	City or place	Start of partial eclipse	Start of total eclipse	Maximum eclipse	End of total eclipse	End of partial eclipse	Duration of totality (min:s)	Duration of eclipse (hr:min)	Maximum magnitude
Angola	Luanda	11:18:43	12:54:42	12:55:33	12:56:23	14:32:08	1:41	3:13	1.0059
Angola	Uíge	11:24:50	13:02:18	13:02:28	13:02:37	14:38:16	0:19	3:13	1.0003
Uganda	Mbale	14:29:01	16:00:33	16:00:43	16:00:52	17:20:02	0:19	2:51	1.0005

=== Places experiencing partial eclipse ===
Solar Eclipse of April 30, 2041 (Local Times)
Country or territory	City or place	Start of partial eclipse	Maximum eclipse	End of partial eclipse	Duration of eclipse (hr:min)	Maximum coverage
South Georgia and the South Sandwich Islands	King Edward Point	07:44:05 (sunrise)	08:21:40	09:26:48	1:43	70.79%
Saint Helena, Ascension and Tristan da Cunha	Edinburgh of the Seven Seas	09:19:38	10:33:19	11:54:10	2:35	86.56%
Saint Helena, Ascension and Tristan da Cunha	Jamestown	09:40:15	11:02:14	12:32:28	2:52	70.83%
Namibia	Opuwo	12:07:07	13:39:57	15:14:14	3:07	75.16%
Namibia	Windhoek	12:11:27	13:40:18	15:09:25	2:58	57.39%
Angola	Huambo	11:18:05	12:54:19	14:29:36	3:12	84.58%
São Tomé and Príncipe	São Tomé	10:28:09	11:58:01	13:29:12	3:01	59.84%
Angola	Malanje	11:24:27	13:02:01	14:37:21	3:13	92.25%
Gabon	Libreville	11:31:57	13:04:20	14:36:34	3:05	66.34%
Equatorial Guinea	Malabo	11:40:10	13:09:11	14:37:40	2:58	54.85%
Democratic Republic of the Congo	Kinshasa	11:31:39	13:09:21	14:44:11	3:13	93.89%
Republic of the Congo	Brazzaville	11:31:43	13:09:23	14:44:13	3:13	93.66%
Gabon	Franceville	11:33:58	13:10:12	14:44:10	3:10	81.98%
Cameroon	Yaoundé	11:44:17	13:15:34	14:44:48	3:01	60.59%
Zambia	Lusaka	12:50:53	14:22:09	15:45:29	2:55	56.07%
Zimbabwe	Harare	12:57:46	14:24:47	15:43:39	2:46	47.14%
Central African Republic	Bangui	11:58:02	13:32:25	15:00:30	3:02	72.55%
Malawi	Lilongwe	13:09:33	14:38:00	15:56:15	2:47	54.58%
Burundi	Gitega	13:10:41	14:46:10	16:10:15	3:00	89.72%
Rwanda	Kigali	13:13:20	14:48:37	16:12:19	2:59	94.55%
Uganda	Kampala	14:23:42	15:56:48	17:17:43	2:54	100.00%
Tanzania	Dar es Salaam	14:32:22	16:00:01	17:15:25	2:43	73.28%
Comoros	Moroni	14:38:17	16:00:02	17:10:40	2:32	57.57%
South Sudan	Juba	13:29:00	15:00:15	16:20:00	2:51	85.51%
Kenya	Nairobi	14:32:25	16:02:38	17:20:15	2:48	92.78%
Sudan	Khartoum	13:53:38	15:11:01	16:20:00	2:26	46.40%
Ethiopia	Addis Ababa	14:52:34	16:15:14	17:27:03	2:34	72.10%
Somalia	Mogadishu	14:56:14	16:18:08	17:28:25	2:32	97.56%
Seychelles	Victoria	16:07:39	17:21:49	18:13:50 (sunset)	2:06	84.61%
Djibouti	Djibouti	15:05:25	16:21:54	17:28:45	2:23	62.00%

== Eclipse details ==
Shown below are two tables displaying details about this particular solar eclipse. The first table outlines times at which the Moon's penumbra or umbra attains the specific parameter, and the second table describes various other parameters pertaining to this eclipse.

April 30, 2041 Solar Eclipse Times
Event	Time (UTC)
First Penumbral External Contact	2041 April 30 at 09:12:27.1 UTC
First Umbral External Contact	2041 April 30 at 10:15:41.8 UTC
First Central Line	2041 April 30 at 10:15:50.2 UTC
First Umbral Internal Contact	2041 April 30 at 10:15:58.6 UTC
Equatorial Conjunction	2041 April 30 at 11:30:49.1 UTC
First Penumbral Internal Contact	2041 April 30 at 11:46:56.5 UTC
Ecliptic Conjunction	2041 April 30 at 11:47:32.9 UTC
Greatest Eclipse	2041 April 30 at 11:52:20.8 UTC
Greatest Duration	2041 April 30 at 11:53:28.8 UTC
Last Penumbral Internal Contact	2041 April 30 at 11:58:14.0 UTC
Last Umbral Internal Contact	2041 April 30 at 13:28:59.8 UTC
Last Central Line	2041 April 30 at 13:29:05.6 UTC
Last Umbral External Contact	2041 April 30 at 13:29:11.3 UTC
Last Penumbral External Contact	2041 April 30 at 14:32:28.9 UTC

April 30, 2041 Solar Eclipse Parameters
Parameter	Value
Eclipse Magnitude	1.01891
Eclipse Obscuration	1.03817
Gamma	−0.44919
Sun Right Ascension	02h32m22.2s
Sun Declination	+14°58'18.8"
Sun Semi-Diameter	15'52.6"
Sun Equatorial Horizontal Parallax	08.7"
Moon Right Ascension	02h33m06.0s
Moon Declination	+14°34'20.1"
Moon Semi-Diameter	15'56.6"
Moon Equatorial Horizontal Parallax	0°58'30.8"
ΔT	79.3 s

== Eclipse season ==
This eclipse is part of an eclipse season, a period, roughly every six months, when eclipses occur. Only two (or occasionally three) eclipse seasons occur each year, and each season lasts about 35 days and repeats just short of six months (173 days) later; thus two full eclipse seasons always occur each year. Either two or three eclipses happen each eclipse season. In the sequence below, each eclipse is separated by a fortnight.

Eclipse season of April–May 2041
April 30 Ascending node (new moon)	May 16 Descending node (full moon)
Total solar eclipse Solar Saros 129	Partial lunar eclipse Lunar Saros 141

== Related eclipses ==
=== Eclipses in 2041 ===
- A total solar eclipse on April 30.
- A partial lunar eclipse on May 16.
- An annular solar eclipse on October 25.
- A partial lunar eclipse on November 8.

=== Metonic ===
- Preceded by: Solar eclipse of July 13, 2037
- Followed by: Solar eclipse of February 16, 2045

=== Tzolkinex ===
- Preceded by: Solar eclipse of March 20, 2034
- Followed by: Solar eclipse of June 11, 2048

=== Half-Saros ===
- Preceded by: Lunar eclipse of April 25, 2032
- Followed by: Lunar eclipse of May 6, 2050

=== Tritos ===
- Preceded by: Solar eclipse of June 1, 2030
- Followed by: Solar eclipse of March 30, 2052

=== Solar Saros 129 ===
- Preceded by: Solar eclipse of April 20, 2023
- Followed by: Solar eclipse of May 11, 2059

=== Inex ===
- Preceded by: Solar eclipse of May 20, 2012
- Followed by: Solar eclipse of April 11, 2070

=== Triad ===
- Preceded by: Solar eclipse of June 30, 1954
- Followed by: Solar eclipse of March 1, 2128

=== Solar eclipses of 2040–2043 ===
This eclipse is a member of a semester series. An eclipse in a semester series of solar eclipses repeats approximately every 177 days and 4 hours (a semester) at alternating nodes of the Moon's orbit.

Solar eclipse series sets from 2040 to 2043
Ascending node			Descending node		
Saros	Map	Gamma	Saros	Map	Gamma
119	May 11, 2040 Partial	−1.2529	124	November 4, 2040 Partial	1.0993
129	April 30, 2041 Total	−0.4492	134	October 25, 2041 Annular	0.4133
139	April 20, 2042 Total	0.2956	144	October 14, 2042 Annular	−0.303
149	April 9, 2043 Total (non-central)	1.0031	154	October 3, 2043 Annular (non-central)	1.0102

=== Saros 129 ===
This eclipse is a part of Saros series 129, repeating every 18 years, 11 days, and containing 80 events. The series started with a partial solar eclipse on October 3, 1103. It contains annular eclipses from May 6, 1464 through March 18, 1969; hybrid eclipses from March 29, 1987 through April 20, 2023; and total eclipses from April 30, 2041 through July 26, 2185. The series ends at member 80 as a partial eclipse on February 21, 2528. Its eclipses are tabulated in three columns; every third eclipse in the same column is one exeligmos apart, so they all cast shadows over approximately the same parts of the Earth.

The longest duration of annularity was produced by member 34 at 5 minutes, 10 seconds on October 4, 1698, and the longest duration of totality will be produced by member 58 at 3 minutes, 43 seconds on June 25, 2131. All eclipses in this series occur at the Moon’s ascending node of orbit.

Series members 40–61 occur between 1801 and 2200:
40	41	42
December 10, 1806	December 20, 1824	December 31, 1842
43	44	45
January 11, 1861	January 22, 1879	February 1, 1897
46	47	48
February 14, 1915	February 24, 1933	March 7, 1951
49	50	51
March 18, 1969	March 29, 1987	April 8, 2005
52	53	54
April 20, 2023	April 30, 2041	May 11, 2059
55	56	57
May 22, 2077	June 2, 2095	June 13, 2113
58	59	60
June 25, 2131	July 5, 2149	July 16, 2167
61
July 26, 2185

=== Metonic series ===
The metonic series repeats eclipses every 19 years (6939.69 days), lasting about 5 cycles. Eclipses occur in nearly the same calendar date. In addition, the octon subseries repeats 1/5 of that or every 3.8 years (1387.94 days). All eclipses in this table occur at the Moon's ascending node.

21 eclipse events between July 13, 2018 and July 12, 2094
July 12–13	April 30–May 1	February 16–17	December 5–6	September 22–23
117	119	121	123	125
July 13, 2018	April 30, 2022	February 17, 2026	December 5, 2029	September 23, 2033
127	129	131	133	135
July 13, 2037	April 30, 2041	February 16, 2045	December 5, 2048	September 22, 2052
137	139	141	143	145
July 12, 2056	April 30, 2060	February 17, 2064	December 6, 2067	September 23, 2071
147	149	151	153	155
July 13, 2075	May 1, 2079	February 16, 2083	December 6, 2086	September 23, 2090
157
July 12, 2094

=== Tritos series ===
This eclipse is a part of a tritos cycle, repeating at alternating nodes every 135 synodic months (≈ 3986.63 days, or 11 years minus 1 month). Their appearance and longitude are irregular due to a lack of synchronization with the anomalistic month (period of perigee), but groupings of 3 tritos cycles (≈ 33 years minus 3 months) come close (≈ 434.044 anomalistic months), so eclipses are similar in these groupings.

Series members between 1801 and 2200
March 14, 1801 (Saros 107)	February 12, 1812 (Saros 108)	January 12, 1823 (Saros 109)		November 10, 1844 (Saros 111)
		August 9, 1877 (Saros 114)	July 9, 1888 (Saros 115)	June 8, 1899 (Saros 116)
May 9, 1910 (Saros 117)	April 8, 1921 (Saros 118)	March 7, 1932 (Saros 119)	February 4, 1943 (Saros 120)	January 5, 1954 (Saros 121)
December 4, 1964 (Saros 122)	November 3, 1975 (Saros 123)	October 3, 1986 (Saros 124)	September 2, 1997 (Saros 125)	August 1, 2008 (Saros 126)
July 2, 2019 (Saros 127)	June 1, 2030 (Saros 128)	April 30, 2041 (Saros 129)	March 30, 2052 (Saros 130)	February 28, 2063 (Saros 131)
January 27, 2074 (Saros 132)	December 27, 2084 (Saros 133)	November 27, 2095 (Saros 134)	October 26, 2106 (Saros 135)	September 26, 2117 (Saros 136)
August 25, 2128 (Saros 137)	July 25, 2139 (Saros 138)	June 25, 2150 (Saros 139)	May 25, 2161 (Saros 140)	April 23, 2172 (Saros 141)
March 23, 2183 (Saros 142)	February 21, 2194 (Saros 143)			

=== Inex series ===
This eclipse is a part of the long period inex cycle, repeating at alternating nodes, every 358 synodic months (≈ 10,571.95 days, or 29 years minus 20 days). Their appearance and longitude are irregular due to a lack of synchronization with the anomalistic month (period of perigee). However, groupings of 3 inex cycles (≈ 87 years minus 2 months) comes close (≈ 1,151.02 anomalistic months), so eclipses are similar in these groupings.

Series members between 1801 and 2200
October 9, 1809 (Saros 121)	September 18, 1838 (Saros 122)	August 29, 1867 (Saros 123)
August 9, 1896 (Saros 124)	July 20, 1925 (Saros 125)	June 30, 1954 (Saros 126)
June 11, 1983 (Saros 127)	May 20, 2012 (Saros 128)	April 30, 2041 (Saros 129)
April 11, 2070 (Saros 130)	March 21, 2099 (Saros 131)	March 1, 2128 (Saros 132)
February 9, 2157 (Saros 133)	January 20, 2186 (Saros 134)	
