= Solar eclipse of May 9, 2032 =

Future annular solar eclipse

- Annular eclipse
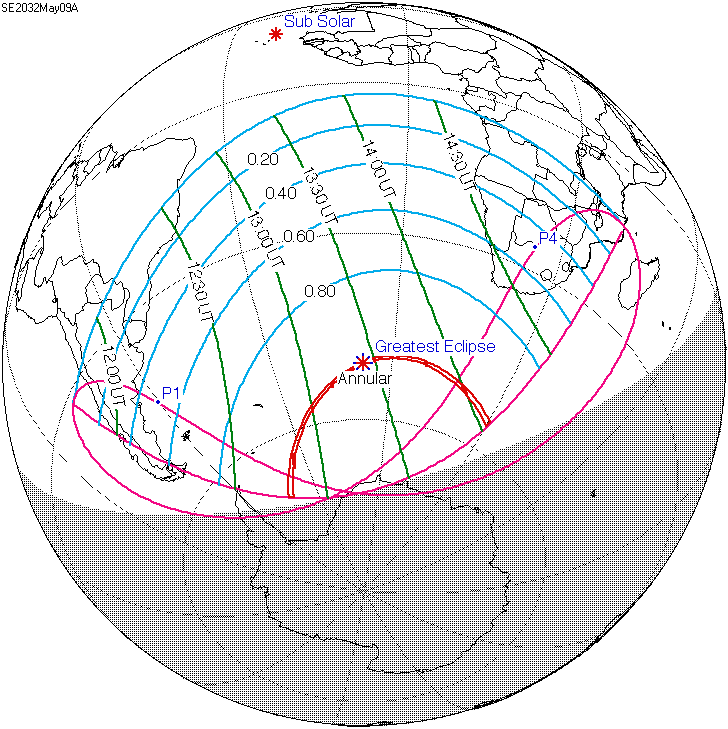
- Map
- Gamma: −0.9375
- Magnitude: 0.9957

Maximum eclipse
- Duration: 22 s (0 min 22 s)
- Coordinates: 51.3°S 7.1°W
- Max. width of band: 44 km (27 mi)

Times (UTC)
- Greatest eclipse: 13:26:42

References
- Saros: 148 (22 of 75)
- Catalog # (SE5000): 9579

An annular solar eclipse will occur at the Moon's descending node of orbit on Sunday, May 9, 2032, with a magnitude of 0.9957. A solar eclipse occurs when the Moon passes between Earth and the Sun, thereby totally or partly obscuring the image of the Sun for a viewer on Earth. An annular solar eclipse occurs when the Moon's apparent diameter is smaller than the Sun's, blocking most of the Sun's light and causing the Sun to look like an annulus (ring). An annular eclipse appears as a partial eclipse over a region of the Earth thousands of kilometres wide. The Moon's apparent diameter will be near the average diameter because it will occur 5.7 days after perigee (on May 3, 2032, at 21:40 UTC) and 7.4 days before apogee (on May 16, 2032, at 23:20 UTC).

Since most of the path of this eclipse is narrow and passes over the South Atlantic Ocean, no land areas will witness annularity. However, a partial eclipse will be visible for parts of southern South America and Southern Africa.

== Images ==
Animated path

== Eclipse timing ==
=== Places experiencing partial eclipse ===
Solar Eclipse of May 9, 2032 (Local Times)
Country or territory	City or place	Start of partial eclipse	Maximum eclipse	End of partial eclipse	Duration of eclipse (hr:min)	Maximum coverage
Chile	Santiago	07:25:27	07:56:25	08:29:08	1:06	4.62%
Argentina	Córdoba	08:25:35	08:59:43	09:36:01	1:10	5.36%
Paraguay	Asunción	08:44:30	09:04:48	09:25:53	0:41	0.83%
Argentina	Buenos Aires	08:16:06	09:05:41	09:59:44	1:44	16.64%
Uruguay	Montevideo	08:15:15	09:07:56	10:05:35	1:50	19.51%
Argentina	Ushuaia	09:09:46 (sunrise)	09:15:14	10:21:04	1:11	56.45%
Falkland Islands	Stanley	08:16:20 (sunrise)	09:17:59	10:28:52	2:13	58.65%
Chile	Punta Arenas	09:13:49 (sunrise)	09:18:35	10:15:51	1:02	49.00%
Brazil	São Paulo	08:38:28	09:19:59	10:04:39	1:26	5.76%
Brazil	Rio de Janeiro	08:38:51	09:26:05	10:17:11	1:38	7.91%
Antarctica	Orcadas Base	08:26:23	09:37:42	10:52:58	2:27	87.65%
South Georgia and the South Sandwich Islands	King Edward Point	09:25:09	10:41:17	12:02:00	2:37	84.36%
Saint Helena, Ascension and Tristan da Cunha	Edinburgh of the Seven Seas	11:53:24	13:26:08	14:56:55	3:04	73.06%
Bouvet Island	Bouvet Island	14:16:07	15:38:12	16:56:07	2:40	94.01%
Saint Helena, Ascension and Tristan da Cunha	Jamestown	12:42:26	14:01:27	15:14:07	2:32	24.27%
South Africa	Cape Town	15:05:32	16:25:49	17:36:26	2:31	63.51%
Madagascar	Toliara	17:07:05	17:31:40	17:34:05 (sunset)	2:31	10.86%
Namibia	Windhoek	15:25:06	16:36:53	17:39:54	2:15	34.59%
Angola	Lubango	14:37:39	15:38:36	16:32:56	1:55	17.10%
Lesotho	Maseru	15:30:57	16:39:52	17:29:27 (sunset)	1:59	44.89%
Angola	Luanda	15:02:12	15:41:55	16:18:37	1:16	4.48%
Botswana	Gaborone	15:38:26	16:43:33	17:41:18	2:05	33.71%
South Africa	Johannesburg	15:38:38	16:43:34	17:32:12 (sunset)	1:54	36.13%
Angola	Menongue	14:48:59	15:43:59	16:33:22	1:44	14.19%
South Africa	Pretoria	15:39:55	16:44:07	17:32:21 (sunset)	1:52	34.79%
Eswatini	Mbabane	15:43:22	16:45:22	17:19:37 (sunset)	1:36	33.92%
Mozambique	Maputo	15:46:21	16:46:27	17:14:30 (sunset)	1:28	31.79%
Zimbabwe	Harare	16:06:05	16:52:30	17:32:28 (sunset)	1:26	12.82%
Zambia	Lusaka	16:09:19	16:52:33	17:32:16	1:23	9.44%
Malawi	Lilongwe	16:25:46	16:56:06	17:24:41	1:01	3.75%

== Eclipse details ==
Shown below are two tables displaying details about this particular solar eclipse. The first table outlines times at which the Moon's penumbra or umbra attains the specific parameter, and the second table describes various other parameters pertaining to this eclipse.

May 9, 2032 Solar Eclipse Times
Event	Time (UTC)
First Penumbral External Contact	2032 May 09 at 11:11:06.6 UTC
First Umbral External Contact	2032 May 09 at 12:48:26.6 UTC
First Central Line	2032 May 09 at 12:49:18.2 UTC
Greatest Duration	2032 May 09 at 12:49:18.2 UTC
First Umbral Internal Contact	2032 May 09 at 12:50:10.9 UTC
Equatorial Conjunction	2032 May 09 at 13:08:19.5 UTC
Greatest Eclipse	2032 May 09 at 13:26:42.4 UTC
Ecliptic Conjunction	2032 May 09 at 13:36:54.7 UTC
Last Umbral Internal Contact	2032 May 09 at 14:03:24.2 UTC
Last Central Line	2032 May 09 at 14:04:19.8 UTC
Last Umbral External Contact	2032 May 09 at 14:05:14.2 UTC
Last Penumbral External Contact	2032 May 09 at 15:42:32.2 UTC

May 9, 2032 Solar Eclipse Parameters
Parameter	Value
Eclipse Magnitude	0.99570
Eclipse Obscuration	0.99143
Gamma	−0.93748
Sun Right Ascension	03h08m06.7s
Sun Declination	+17°35'43.5"
Sun Semi-Diameter	15'50.4"
Sun Equatorial Horizontal Parallax	08.7"
Moon Right Ascension	03h08m46.1s
Moon Declination	+16°42'42.0"
Moon Semi-Diameter	15'41.5"
Moon Equatorial Horizontal Parallax	0°57'35.4"
ΔT	74.9 s

== Eclipse season ==
This eclipse is part of an eclipse season, a period, roughly every six months, when eclipses occur. Only two (or occasionally three) eclipse seasons occur each year, and each season lasts about 35 days and repeats just short of six months (173 days) later; thus two full eclipse seasons always occur each year. Either two or three eclipses happen each eclipse season. In the sequence below, each eclipse is separated by a fortnight.

Eclipse season of April–May 2032
April 25 Ascending node (full moon)	May 9 Descending node (new moon)
Total lunar eclipse Lunar Saros 122	Annular solar eclipse Solar Saros 148

== Related eclipses ==
=== Eclipses in 2032 ===
- A total lunar eclipse on April 25.
- An annular solar eclipse on May 9.
- A total lunar eclipse on October 18.
- A partial solar eclipse on November 3.

=== Metonic ===
- Preceded by: Solar eclipse of July 22, 2028
- Followed by: Solar eclipse of February 27, 2036

=== Tzolkinex ===
- Preceded by: Solar eclipse of March 29, 2025
- Followed by: Solar eclipse of June 21, 2039

=== Half-Saros ===
- Preceded by: Lunar eclipse of May 5, 2023
- Followed by: Lunar eclipse of May 16, 2041

=== Tritos ===
- Preceded by: Solar eclipse of June 10, 2021
- Followed by: Solar eclipse of April 9, 2043

=== Solar Saros 148 ===
- Preceded by: Solar eclipse of April 29, 2014
- Followed by: Solar eclipse of May 20, 2050

=== Inex ===
- Preceded by: Solar eclipse of May 31, 2003
- Followed by: Solar eclipse of April 20, 2061

=== Triad ===
- Preceded by: Solar eclipse of July 9, 1945
- Followed by: Solar eclipse of March 11, 2119

=== Solar eclipses of 2029–2032 ===
This eclipse is a member of a semester series. An eclipse in a semester series of solar eclipses repeats approximately every 177 days and 4 hours (a semester) at alternating nodes of the Moon's orbit.

The partial solar eclipses on January 14, 2029 and July 11, 2029 occur in the previous lunar year eclipse set.

Solar eclipse series sets from 2029 to 2032
Descending node			Ascending node		
Saros	Map	Gamma	Saros	Map	Gamma
118	June 12, 2029 Partial	1.29431	123	December 5, 2029 Partial	−1.06090
128	June 1, 2030 Annular	0.56265	133	November 25, 2030 Total	−0.38669
138	May 21, 2031 Annular	−0.19699	143	November 14, 2031 Hybrid	0.30776
148	May 9, 2032 Annular	−0.93748	153	November 3, 2032 Partial	1.06431

=== Saros 148 ===
This eclipse is a part of Saros series 148, repeating every 18 years, 11 days, and containing 75 events. The series started with a partial solar eclipse on September 21, 1653. It contains annular eclipses on April 29, 2014 and May 9, 2032; a hybrid eclipse on May 20, 2050; and total eclipses from May 31, 2068 through August 3, 2771. The series ends at member 75 as a partial eclipse on December 12, 2987. Its eclipses are tabulated in three columns; every third eclipse in the same column is one exeligmos apart, so they all cast shadows over approximately the same parts of the Earth.

The longest duration of annularity will be produced by member 22 at 22 seconds (by default) on May 9, 2032, and the longest duration of totality will be produced by member 54 at 5 minutes, 23 seconds on April 26, 2609. All eclipses in this series occur at the Moon’s descending node of orbit.

Series members 10–31 occur between 1801 and 2200:
10	11	12
December 30, 1815	January 9, 1834	January 21, 1852
13	14	15
January 31, 1870	February 11, 1888	February 23, 1906
16	17	18
March 5, 1924	March 16, 1942	March 27, 1960
19	20	21
April 7, 1978	April 17, 1996	April 29, 2014
22	23	24
May 9, 2032	May 20, 2050	May 31, 2068
25	26	27
June 11, 2086	June 22, 2104	July 4, 2122
28	29	30
July 14, 2140	July 25, 2158	August 4, 2176
31
August 16, 2194

=== Metonic series ===
The metonic series repeats eclipses every 19 years (6939.69 days), lasting about 5 cycles. Eclipses occur in nearly the same calendar date. In addition, the octon subseries repeats 1/5 of that or every 3.8 years (1387.94 days). All eclipses in this table occur at the Moon's descending node.

21 eclipse events between July 22, 1971 and July 22, 2047
July 22	May 9–11	February 26–27	December 14–15	October 2–3
116	118	120	122	124
July 22, 1971	May 11, 1975	February 26, 1979	December 15, 1982	October 3, 1986
126	128	130	132	134
July 22, 1990	May 10, 1994	February 26, 1998	December 14, 2001	October 3, 2005
136	138	140	142	144
July 22, 2009	May 10, 2013	February 26, 2017	December 14, 2020	October 2, 2024
146	148	150	152	154
July 22, 2028	May 9, 2032	February 27, 2036	December 15, 2039	October 3, 2043
156
July 22, 2047

=== Tritos series ===
This eclipse is a part of a tritos cycle, repeating at alternating nodes every 135 synodic months (≈ 3986.63 days, or 11 years minus 1 month). Their appearance and longitude are irregular due to a lack of synchronization with the anomalistic month (period of perigee), but groupings of 3 tritos cycles (≈ 33 years minus 3 months) come close (≈ 434.044 anomalistic months), so eclipses are similar in these groupings.

Series members between 1801 and 2200
February 21, 1803 (Saros 127)	January 21, 1814 (Saros 128)	December 20, 1824 (Saros 129)	November 20, 1835 (Saros 130)	October 20, 1846 (Saros 131)
September 18, 1857 (Saros 132)	August 18, 1868 (Saros 133)	July 19, 1879 (Saros 134)	June 17, 1890 (Saros 135)	May 18, 1901 (Saros 136)
April 17, 1912 (Saros 137)	March 17, 1923 (Saros 138)	February 14, 1934 (Saros 139)	January 14, 1945 (Saros 140)	December 14, 1955 (Saros 141)
November 12, 1966 (Saros 142)	October 12, 1977 (Saros 143)	September 11, 1988 (Saros 144)	August 11, 1999 (Saros 145)	July 11, 2010 (Saros 146)
June 10, 2021 (Saros 147)	May 9, 2032 (Saros 148)	April 9, 2043 (Saros 149)	March 9, 2054 (Saros 150)	February 5, 2065 (Saros 151)
January 6, 2076 (Saros 152)	December 6, 2086 (Saros 153)	November 4, 2097 (Saros 154)	October 5, 2108 (Saros 155)	September 5, 2119 (Saros 156)
August 4, 2130 (Saros 157)	July 3, 2141 (Saros 158)	June 3, 2152 (Saros 159)		April 1, 2174 (Saros 161)

=== Inex series ===
This eclipse is a part of the long period inex cycle, repeating at alternating nodes, every 358 synodic months (≈ 10,571.95 days, or 29 years minus 20 days). Their appearance and longitude are irregular due to a lack of synchronization with the anomalistic month (period of perigee). However, groupings of 3 inex cycles (≈ 87 years minus 2 months) comes close (≈ 1,151.02 anomalistic months), so eclipses are similar in these groupings.

Series members between 1801 and 2200
September 28, 1829 (Saros 141)	September 7, 1858 (Saros 142)	August 19, 1887 (Saros 143)
July 30, 1916 (Saros 144)	July 9, 1945 (Saros 145)	June 20, 1974 (Saros 146)
May 31, 2003 (Saros 147)	May 9, 2032 (Saros 148)	April 20, 2061 (Saros 149)
March 31, 2090 (Saros 150)	March 11, 2119 (Saros 151)	February 19, 2148 (Saros 152)
January 29, 2177 (Saros 153)		

== See also ==
- List of solar eclipses in the 21st century
