= Solar eclipse of April 17, 1996 =

20th-century partial solar eclipse

- Partial eclipse
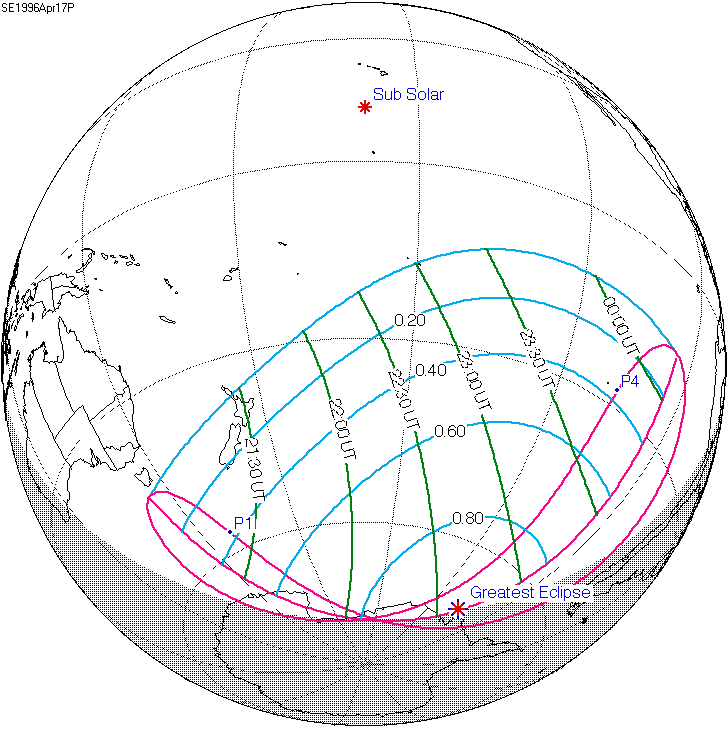
- Map
- Gamma: −1.058
- Magnitude: 0.8799

Maximum eclipse
- Coordinates: 71.3°S 104°W

Times (UTC)
- Greatest eclipse: 22:38:12

References
- Saros: 148 (20 of 75)
- Catalog # (SE5000): 9499

A partial solar eclipse occurred at the Moon's descending node of orbit between Wednesday, April 17 and Thursday, April 18, 1996, with a magnitude of 0.8799. A solar eclipse occurs when the Moon passes between the Earth and the Sun, thereby totally or partly obscuring the image of the Sun for a viewer on Earth. A partial solar eclipse occurs in the polar regions of the Earth when the center of the Moon's shadow misses the Earth.

A partial eclipse was visible in parts of Antarctica, New Zealand, and eastern Oceania.

== Eclipse timing ==
=== Places experiencing partial eclipse ===
Solar Eclipse of April 17, 1996 (Local Times)
Country or territory	City or place	Start of partial eclipse	Maximum eclipse	End of partial eclipse	Duration of eclipse (hr:min)	Maximum coverage
Australia	Macquarie Island (Note: The times listed for this location occur on April 18, 1996, local time.)	06:31:39	07:21:44	08:14:48	1:43	20.58%
New Zealand	Queenstown	08:41:01	09:22:20	10:06:01	1:25	7.99%
New Zealand	Oban	08:37:48	09:22:47	10:10:30	1:33	10.99%
New Zealand	Greymouth	08:46:39	09:24:03	10:03:26	1:17	5.28%
New Zealand	Dunedin	08:39:16	09:24:38	10:12:45	1:33	10.62%
New Zealand	Christchurch	08:43:36	09:26:03	10:10:59	1:27	7.87%
New Zealand	Nelson	08:49:28	09:26:13	10:04:53	1:15	4.69%
New Zealand	New Plymouth	08:57:36	09:26:54	09:57:25	1:00	2.16%
New Zealand	Blenheim	08:48:30	09:27:07	10:07:49	1:19	5.44%
New Zealand	Auckland	09:11:13	09:27:45	09:44:40	0:33	0.35%
New Zealand	Wellington	08:48:55	09:28:07	10:09:28	1:21	5.60%
New Zealand	Whanganui	08:53:17	09:28:17	10:05:01	1:12	3.78%
New Zealand	Hamilton	09:03:06	09:28:29	09:54:47	0:52	1.32%
New Zealand	Te Awamutu	09:01:45	09:28:33	09:56:22	0:55	1.56%
New Zealand	Palmerston North	08:51:33	09:29:06	10:08:35	1:17	4.70%
New Zealand	Whitianga	09:09:01	09:29:06	09:49:46	0:41	0.62%
New Zealand	Taupō	08:57:41	09:29:37	10:02:59	1:05	2.70%
New Zealand	Tauranga	09:02:36	09:29:45	09:57:57	0:55	1.59%
New Zealand	Rotorua	09:00:07	09:29:52	10:00:52	1:01	2.13%
New Zealand	Napier	08:53:59	09:30:51	10:09:33	1:16	4.24%
New Zealand	Whakatāne	09:00:21	09:30:57	10:02:51	1:03	2.28%
New Zealand	Gisborne	08:56:33	09:32:27	10:10:05	1:14	3.75%
New Zealand	Chatham Islands	09:28:42	10:25:27	11:25:40	1:57	17.03%
Antarctica	Zucchelli Station	09:42:47 (sunrise)	09:53:45	10:52:06	1:09	59.07%
Antarctica	Dumont d'Urville Station	08:15:11 (sunrise)	08:20:47	08:26:22	0:11	2.24%
Antarctica	McMurdo Station	10:32:12 (sunrise)	10:44:16	10:56:45	0:25	8.62%
French Polynesia	Papeete	12:52:40	13:01:45	13:10:46	0:18	0.03%
French Polynesia	Gambier Islands	13:19:55	14:23:13	15:21:25	2:02	14.33%
Pitcairn Islands	Adamstown	13:51:21	14:58:37	15:59:37	2:08	19.84%
Chile	Easter Island	16:50:04	17:49:32	18:43:05	1:53	24.30%

== Eclipse details ==
Shown below are two tables displaying details about this particular solar eclipse. The first table outlines times at which the Moon's penumbra or umbra attained the specific parameter, and the second table describes various other parameters pertaining to this eclipse.

April 17, 1996 solar eclipse times
Event	Time (UTC)
First penumbral external contact	1996 April 17 at 20:32:24.8 UTC
Equatorial conjunction	1996 April 17 at 22:06:05.6 UTC
Greatest eclipse	1996 April 17 at 22:38:12.1 UTC
Ecliptic conjunction	1996 April 17 at 22:49:47.9 UTC
Last penumbral external contact	1996 April 18 at 00:44:20.0 UTC

April 17, 1996 solar eclipse parameters
Parameter	Value
Eclipse magnitude	0.87994
Eclipse obscuration	0.84058
Gamma	−1.05796
Sun right ascension	01h44m43.7s
Sun declination	+10°49'43.1"
Sun semi-diameter	15'55.6"
Sun equatorial horizontal parallax	08.8"
Moon right ascension	01h45m48.3s
Moon declination	+09°51'28.1"
Moon semi-diameter	15'35.4"
Moon equatorial horizontal parallax	0°57'13.0"
ΔT	61.8 s

== Eclipse season ==
This eclipse is part of an eclipse season, a period, roughly every six months, when eclipses occur. Only two (or occasionally three) eclipse seasons occur each year, and each season lasts about 35 days and repeats just short of six months (173 days) later; thus two full eclipse seasons always occur each year. Either two or three eclipses happen each eclipse season. In the sequence below, each eclipse is separated by a fortnight.

Eclipse season of April 1996
April 4 Ascending node (full moon)	April 17 Descending node (new moon)
Total lunar eclipse Lunar Saros 122	Partial solar eclipse Solar Saros 148

== Related eclipses ==
=== Eclipses in 1996 ===
- A total lunar eclipse on April 4
- A partial solar eclipse on April 17
- A total lunar eclipse on September 27
- A partial solar eclipse on October 12

=== Metonic ===
- Preceded by: Solar eclipse of June 30, 1992
- Followed by: Solar eclipse of February 5, 2000

=== Tzolkinex ===
- Preceded by: Solar eclipse of March 7, 1989
- Followed by: Solar eclipse of May 31, 2003

=== Half-Saros ===
- Preceded by: Lunar eclipse of April 14, 1987
- Followed by: Lunar eclipse of April 24, 2005

=== Tritos ===
- Preceded by: Solar eclipse of May 19, 1985
- Followed by: Solar eclipse of March 19, 2007

=== Solar Saros 148 ===
- Preceded by: Solar eclipse of April 7, 1978
- Followed by: Solar eclipse of April 29, 2014

=== Inex ===
- Preceded by: Solar eclipse of May 9, 1967
- Followed by: Solar eclipse of March 29, 2025

=== Triad ===
- Preceded by: Solar eclipse of June 17, 1909
- Followed by: Solar eclipse of February 16, 2083

=== Solar eclipses of 1993–1996 ===
This eclipse is a member of a semester series. An eclipse in a semester series of solar eclipses repeats approximately every 177 days and 4 hours (a semester) at alternating nodes of the Moon's orbit.

Solar eclipse series sets from 1993 to 1996
Descending node			Ascending node		
Saros	Map	Gamma	Saros	Map	Gamma
118	May 21, 1993 Partial	1.1372	123	November 13, 1993 Partial	−1.0411
128 Partial in Bismarck, ND, USA	May 10, 1994 Annular	0.4077	133 Totality in Bolivia	November 3, 1994 Total	−0.3522
138	April 29, 1995 Annular	−0.3382	143 Totality in Dundlod, India	October 24, 1995 Total	0.3518
148	April 17, 1996 Partial	−1.058	153	October 12, 1996 Partial	1.1227

=== Saros 148 ===
This eclipse is a part of Saros series 148, repeating every 18 years, 11 days, and containing 75 events. The series started with a partial solar eclipse on September 21, 1653. It contains annular eclipses on April 29, 2014 and May 9, 2032; a hybrid eclipse on May 20, 2050; and total eclipses from May 31, 2068 through August 3, 2771. The series ends at member 75 as a partial eclipse on December 12, 2987. Its eclipses are tabulated in three columns; every third eclipse in the same column is one exeligmos apart, so they all cast shadows over approximately the same parts of the Earth.

The longest duration of annularity will be produced by member 22 at 22 seconds (by default) on May 9, 2032, and the longest duration of totality will be produced by member 54 at 5 minutes, 23 seconds on April 26, 2609. All eclipses in this series occur at the Moon’s descending node of orbit.

Series members 10–31 occur between 1801 and 2200:
10	11	12
December 30, 1815	January 9, 1834	January 21, 1852
13	14	15
January 31, 1870	February 11, 1888	February 23, 1906
16	17	18
March 5, 1924	March 16, 1942	March 27, 1960
19	20	21
April 7, 1978	April 17, 1996	April 29, 2014
22	23	24
May 9, 2032	May 20, 2050	May 31, 2068
25	26	27
June 11, 2086	June 22, 2104	July 4, 2122
28	29	30
July 14, 2140	July 25, 2158	August 4, 2176
31
August 16, 2194

=== Metonic series ===
The metonic series repeats eclipses every 19 years (6939.69 days), lasting about 5 cycles. Eclipses occur in nearly the same calendar date. In addition, the octon subseries repeats 1/5 of that or every 3.8 years (1387.94 days). All eclipses in this table occur at the Moon's descending node.

22 eclipse events between September 12, 1931 and July 1, 2011
September 11–12	June 30–July 1	April 17–19	February 4–5	November 22–23
114	116	118	120	122
September 12, 1931	June 30, 1935	April 19, 1939	February 4, 1943	November 23, 1946
124	126	128	130	132
September 12, 1950	June 30, 1954	April 19, 1958	February 5, 1962	November 23, 1965
134	136	138	140	142
September 11, 1969	June 30, 1973	April 18, 1977	February 4, 1981	November 22, 1984
144	146	148	150	152
September 11, 1988	June 30, 1992	April 17, 1996	February 5, 2000	November 23, 2003
154	156			
September 11, 2007	July 1, 2011			

=== Tritos series ===
This eclipse is a part of a tritos cycle, repeating at alternating nodes every 135 synodic months (≈ 3986.63 days, or 11 years minus 1 month). Their appearance and longitude are irregular due to a lack of synchronization with the anomalistic month (period of perigee), but groupings of 3 tritos cycles (≈ 33 years minus 3 months) come close (≈ 434.044 anomalistic months), so eclipses are similar in these groupings.

The partial solar eclipses on December 7, 2170 (part of Saros 164) and November 7, 2181 (part of Saros 165) are also a part of this series but are not included in the table below.

Series members between 1801 and 2105
September 28, 1810 (Saros 131)	August 27, 1821 (Saros 132)	July 27, 1832 (Saros 133)	June 27, 1843 (Saros 134)	May 26, 1854 (Saros 135)
April 25, 1865 (Saros 136)	March 25, 1876 (Saros 137)	February 22, 1887 (Saros 138)	January 22, 1898 (Saros 139)	December 23, 1908 (Saros 140)
November 22, 1919 (Saros 141)	October 21, 1930 (Saros 142)	September 21, 1941 (Saros 143)	August 20, 1952 (Saros 144)	July 20, 1963 (Saros 145)
June 20, 1974 (Saros 146)	May 19, 1985 (Saros 147)	April 17, 1996 (Saros 148)	March 19, 2007 (Saros 149)	February 15, 2018 (Saros 150)
January 14, 2029 (Saros 151)	December 15, 2039 (Saros 152)	November 14, 2050 (Saros 153)	October 13, 2061 (Saros 154)	September 12, 2072 (Saros 155)
August 13, 2083 (Saros 156)	July 12, 2094 (Saros 157)	June 12, 2105 (Saros 158)		

=== Inex series ===
This eclipse is a part of the long period inex cycle, repeating at alternating nodes, every 358 synodic months (≈ 10,571.95 days, or 29 years minus 20 days). Their appearance and longitude are irregular due to a lack of synchronization with the anomalistic month (period of perigee). However, groupings of 3 inex cycles (≈ 87 years minus 2 months) comes close (≈ 1,151.02 anomalistic months), so eclipses are similar in these groupings.

Series members between 1801 and 2200
August 16, 1822 (Saros 142)	July 28, 1851 (Saros 143)	July 7, 1880 (Saros 144)
June 17, 1909 (Saros 145)	May 29, 1938 (Saros 146)	May 9, 1967 (Saros 147)
April 17, 1996 (Saros 148)	March 29, 2025 (Saros 149)	March 9, 2054 (Saros 150)
February 16, 2083 (Saros 151)	January 29, 2112 (Saros 152)	January 8, 2141 (Saros 153)
December 18, 2169 (Saros 154)	November 28, 2198 (Saros 155)	
