= March 2007 lunar eclipse =

Total lunar eclipse of 3 March 2007

- Total eclipse
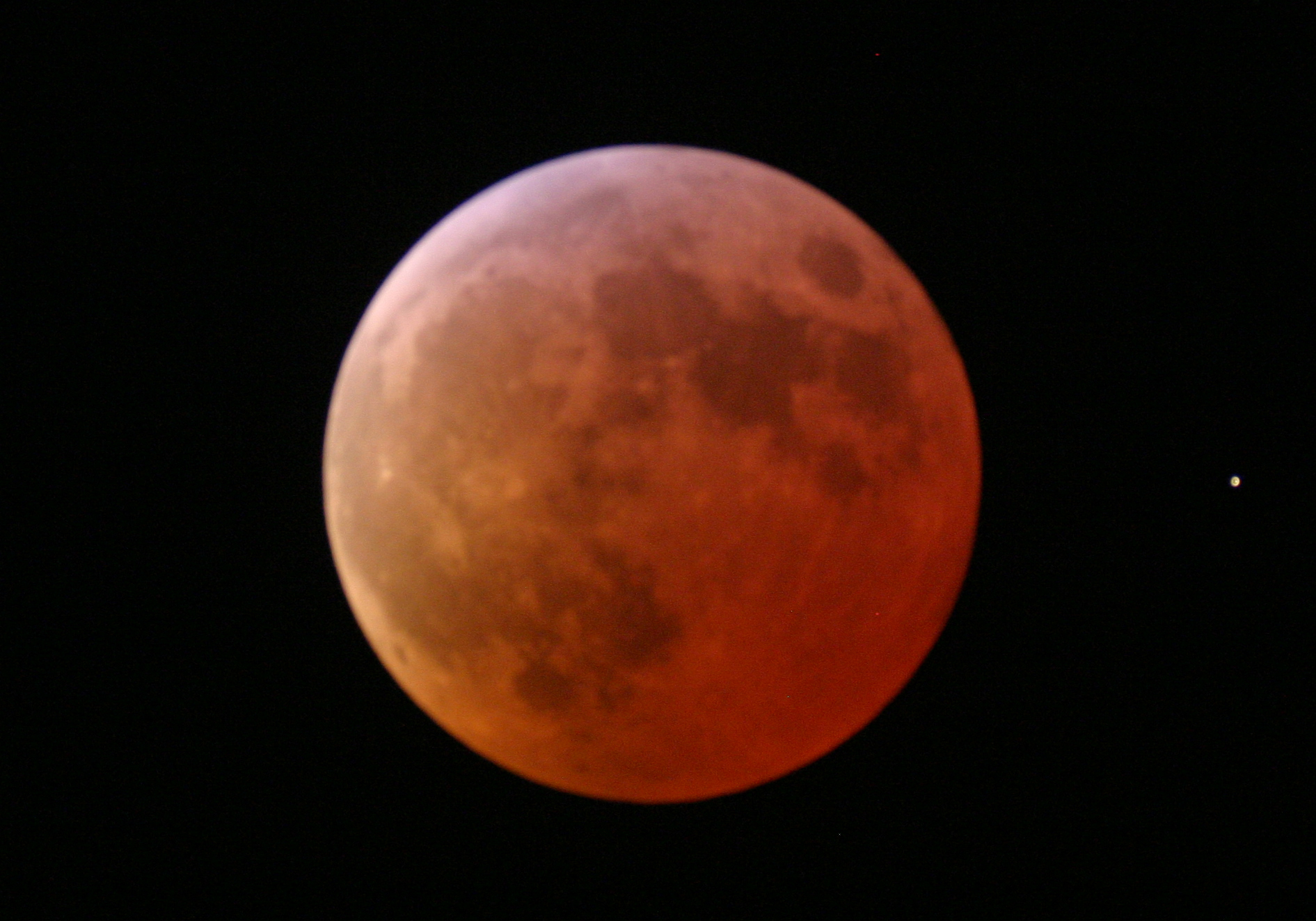
- Totality as viewed from Denmark, 23:31 UTC
- Date: 3 March 2007
- Gamma: 0.3175
- Magnitude: 1.2347
- Saros cycle: 123 (52 of 73)
- Totality: 73 minutes, 21 seconds
- Partiality: 221 minutes, 4 seconds
- Penumbral: 365 minutes, 26 seconds
Contacts (UTC)
- P1: 20:18:11
- U1: 21:30:20
- U2: 22:44:12
- Greatest: 23:20:53
- U3: 23:57:33
- U4: 01:11:24
- P4: 02:23:37

A total lunar eclipse occurred at the Moon’s descending node of orbit on Saturday, 3 March 2007, with an umbral magnitude of 1.2347. A lunar eclipse occurs when the Moon moves into the Earth's shadow, causing the Moon to be darkened. A total lunar eclipse occurs when the Moon's near side entirely passes into the Earth's umbral shadow. Unlike a solar eclipse, which can only be viewed from a relatively small area of the world, a lunar eclipse may be viewed from anywhere on the night side of Earth. A total lunar eclipse can last up to nearly two hours, while a total solar eclipse lasts only a few minutes at any given place, because the Moon's shadow is smaller. Occurring about 2.9 days before apogee (on 6 March 2007, at 22:40 UTC), the Moon's apparent diameter was smaller.

== Visibility ==
The eclipse was completely visible over Africa, Europe, and west Asia, seen rising over much of North and South America and setting over much of Asia and Australia.

Hourly motion shown right to left	The Moon's hourly motion across the Earth's shadow in the constellation of Leo.
Visibility map

== Images ==
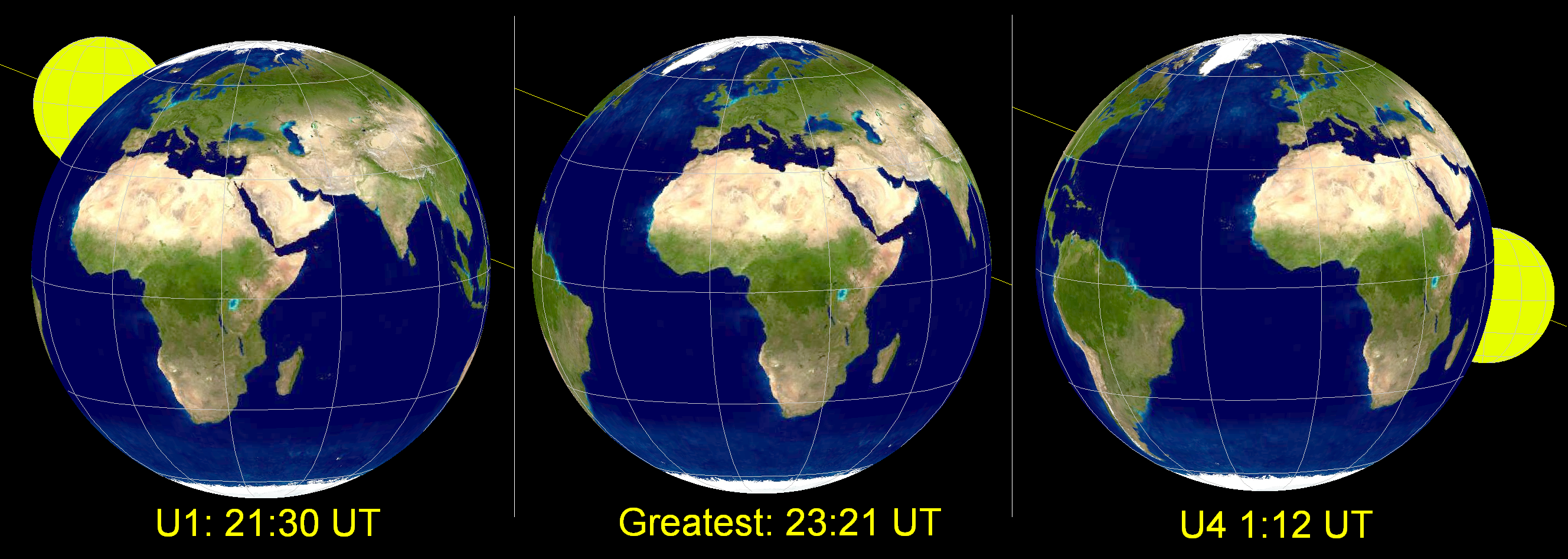

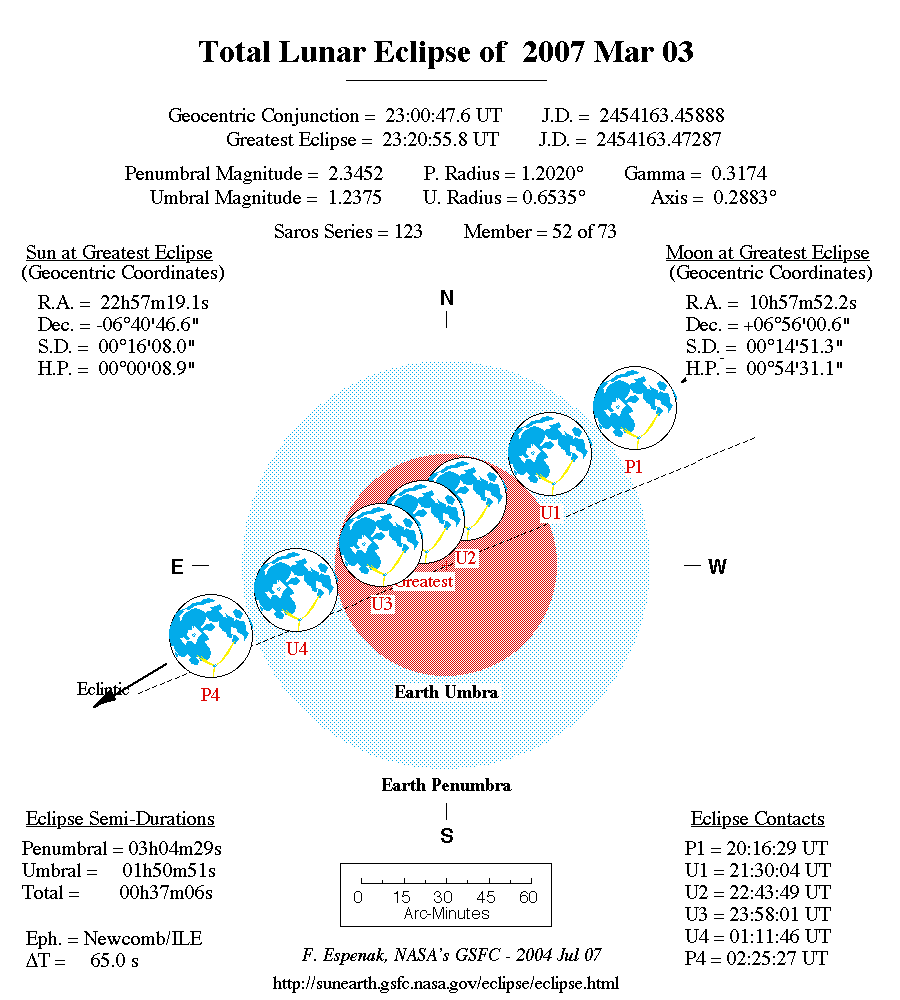
NASA chart of the eclipse

== Gallery ==
Collages
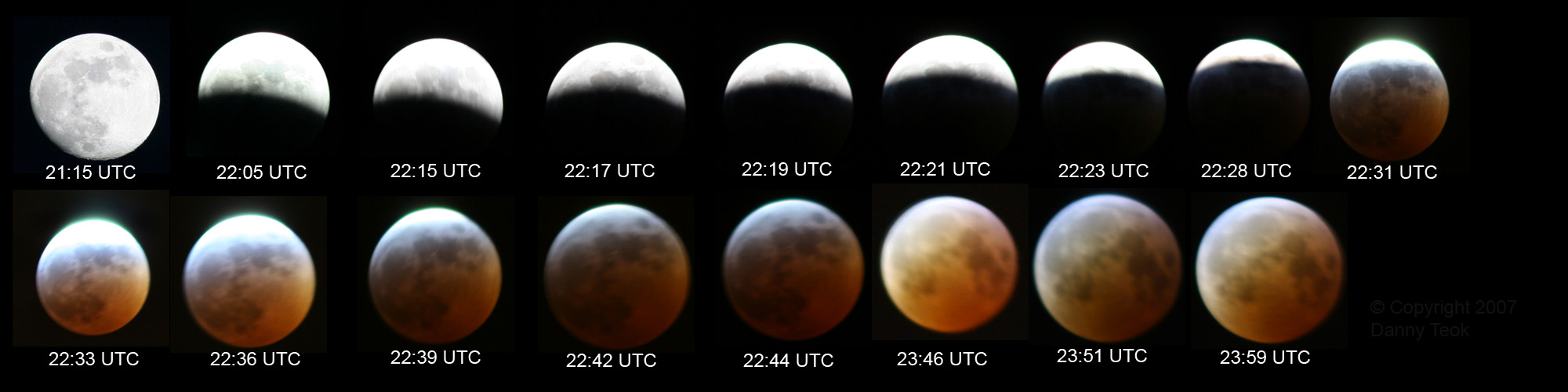
From Leeds, England.
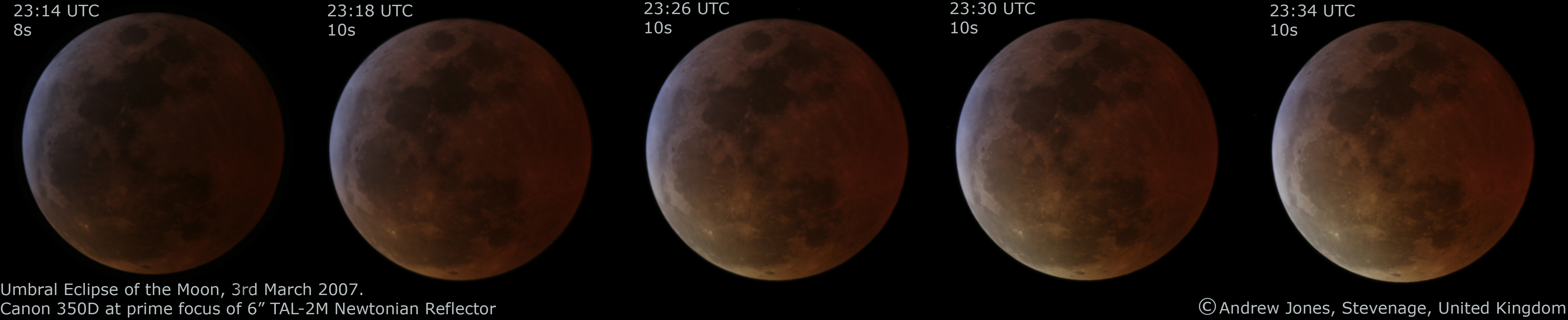
Stevenage, England
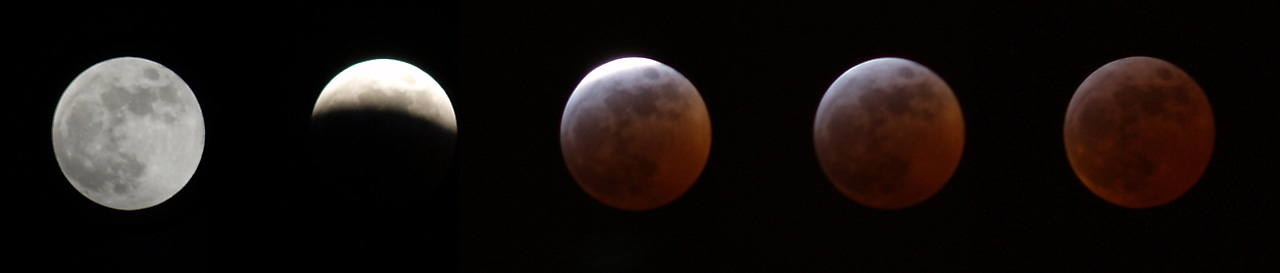
From Madrid, Spain
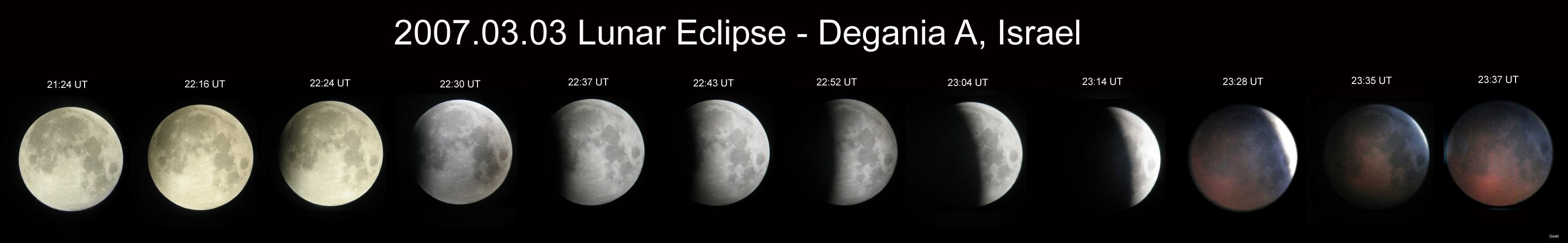
From Degania A, Israel.
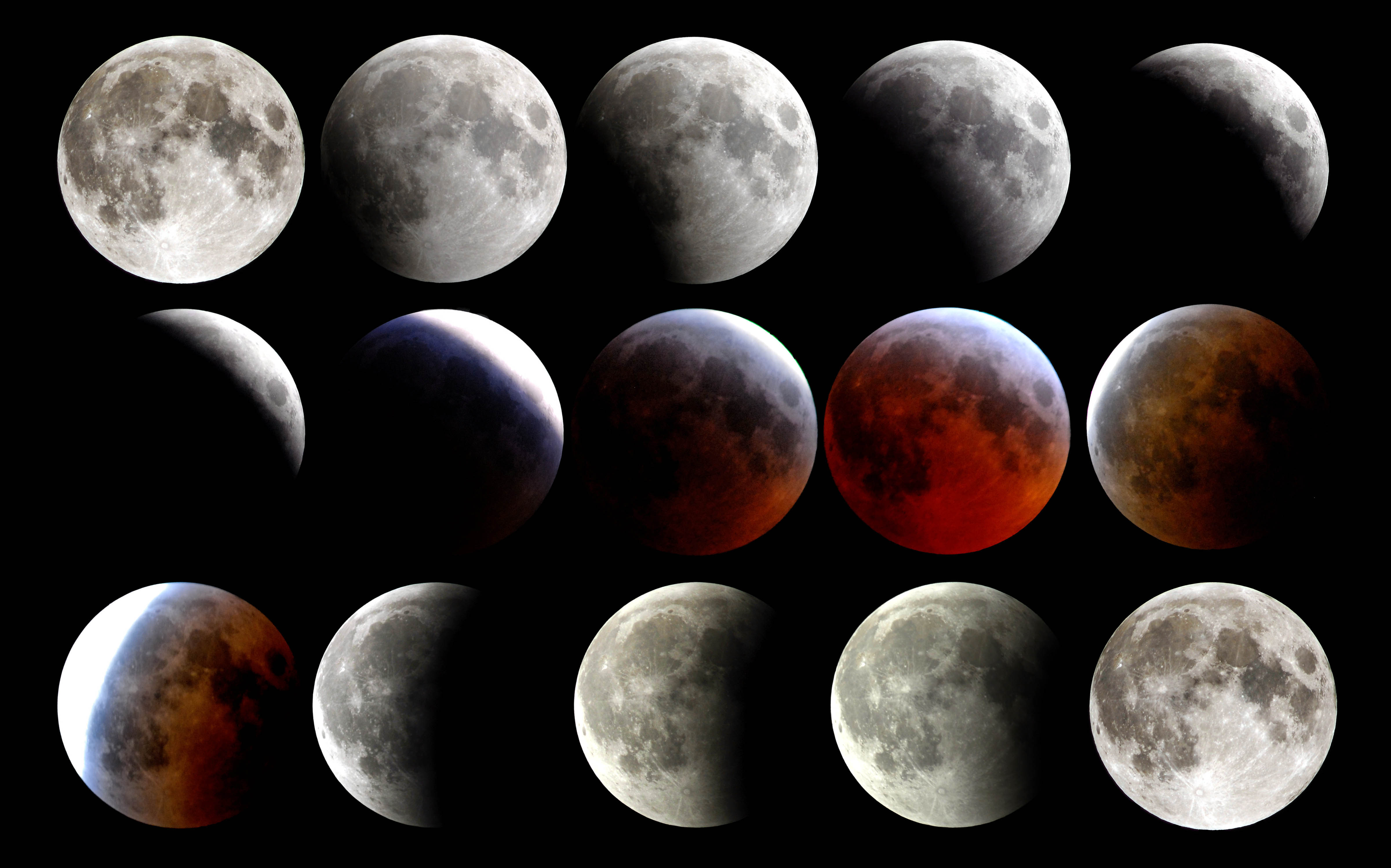
Persian Gulf

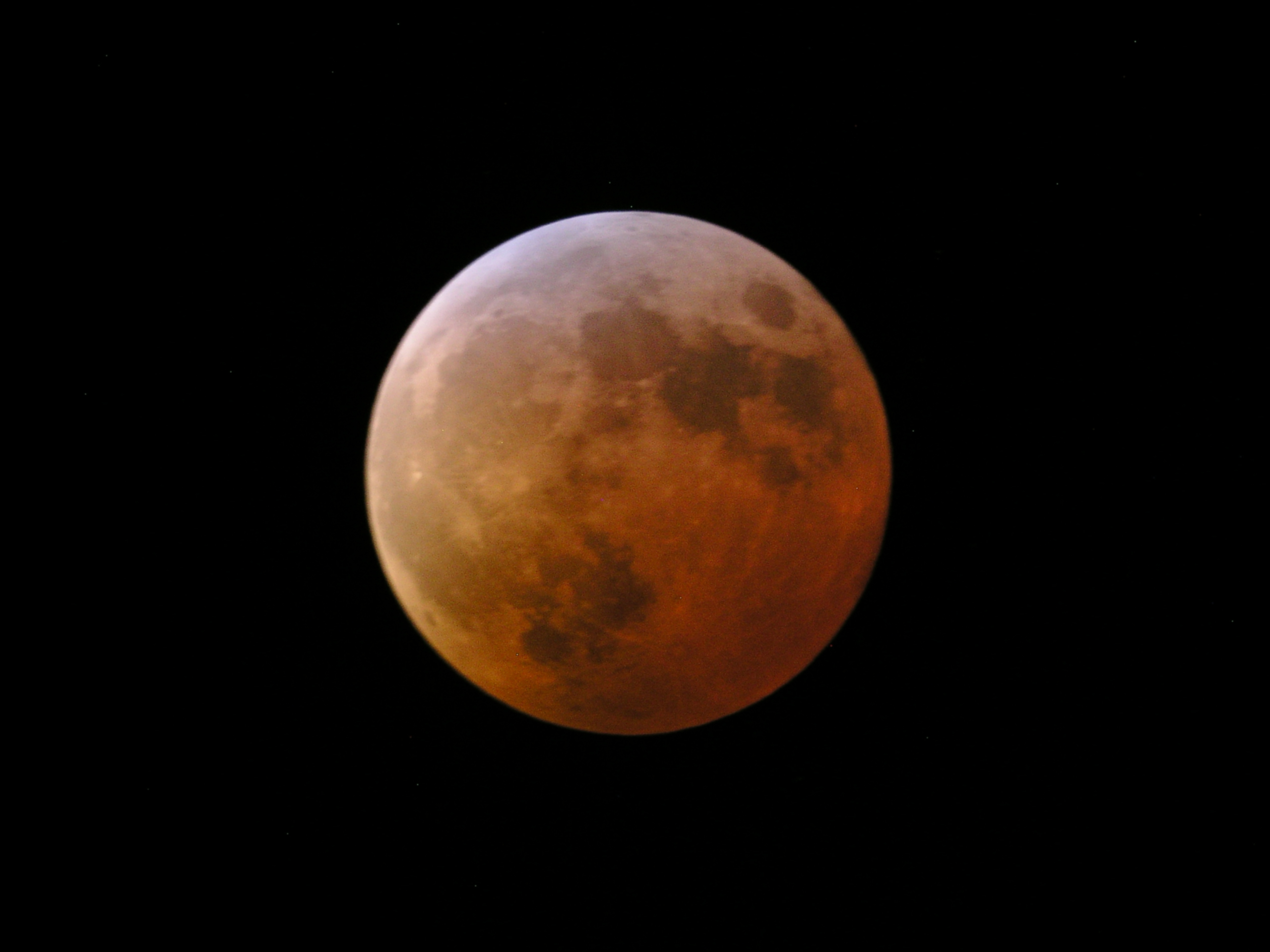
From Kirchberg, St. Gallen, 23:30 UTC

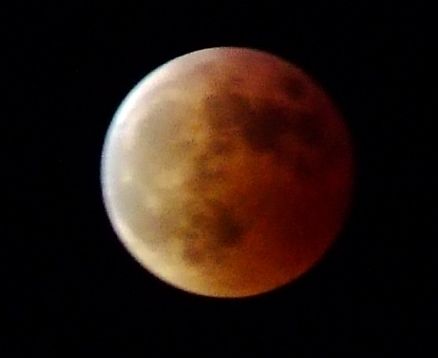
From Huddersfield, UK, 23:52 UTC

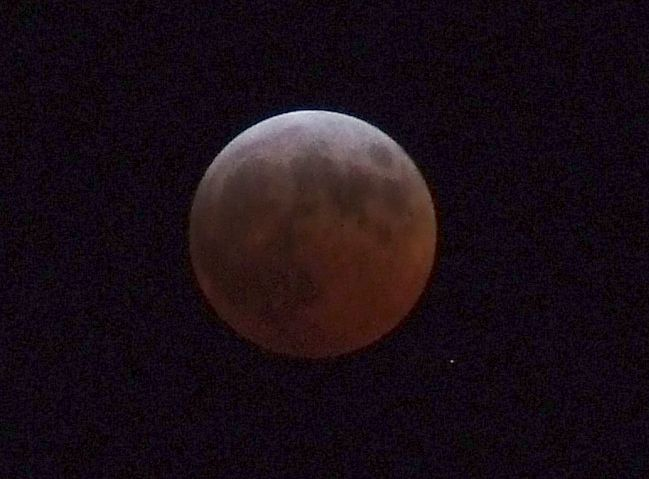
From Augsburg, Germany, 23:53 UTC

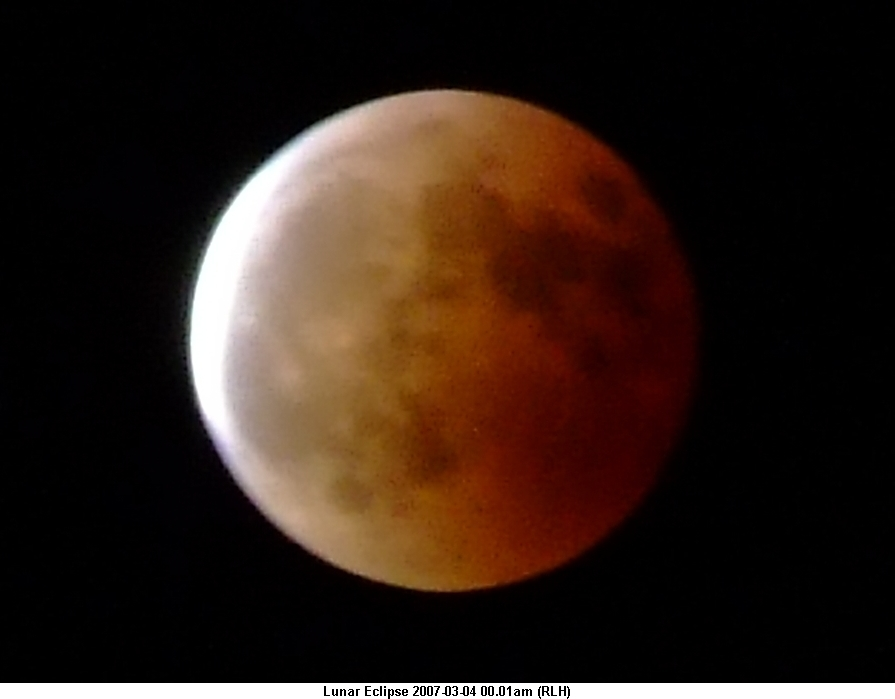
From Huddersfield, UK, 0:01 UTC

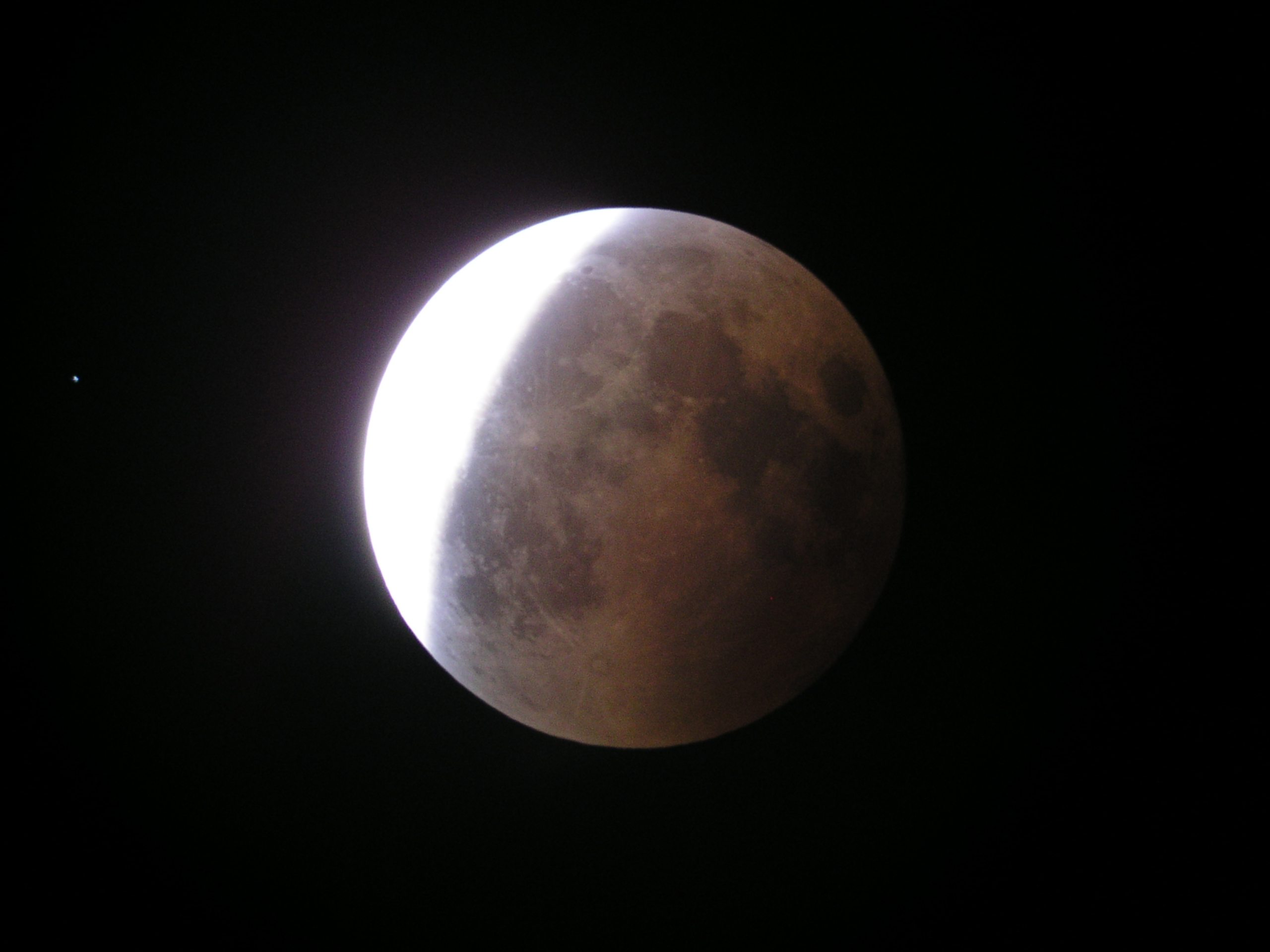
From Kirchberg, St. Gallen, 0:15 UTC

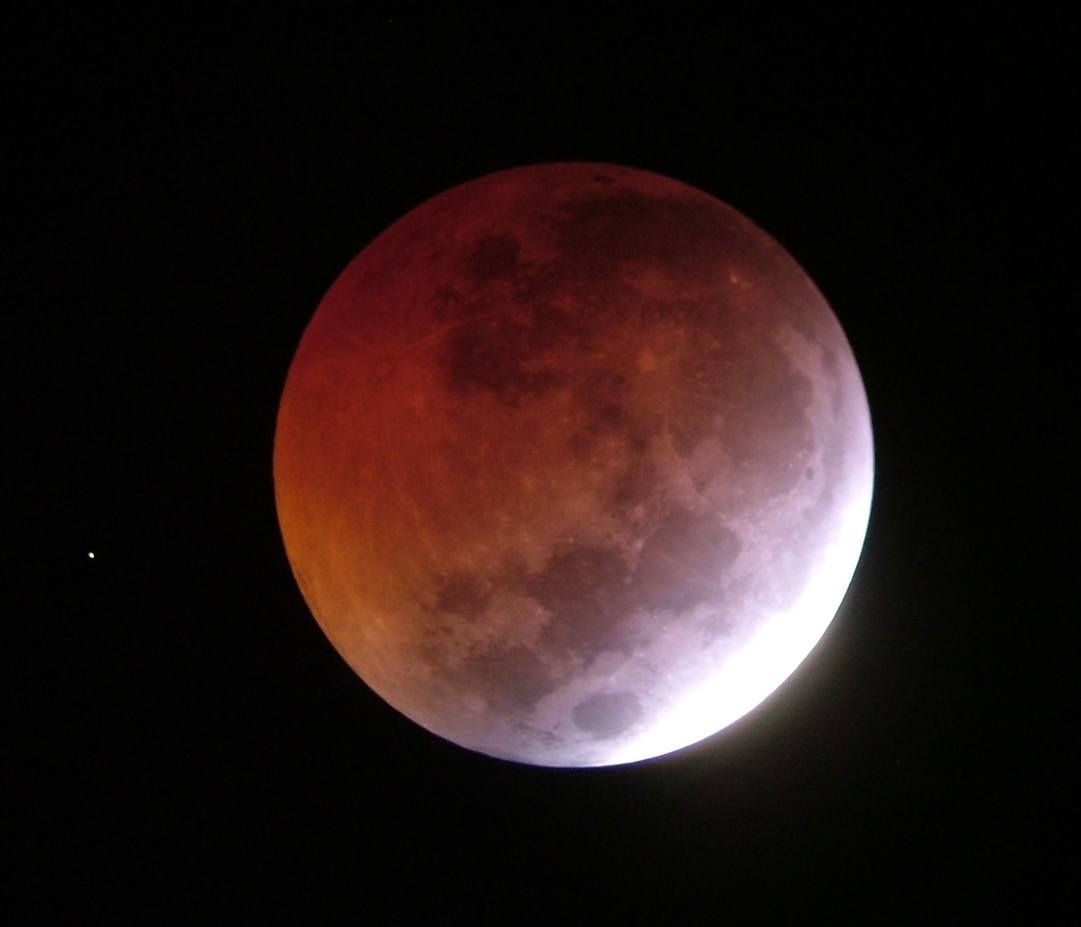
From Cambridge, UK

Timelapse movie in Bülach, Switzerland

Timelapse movie in Belfort, France

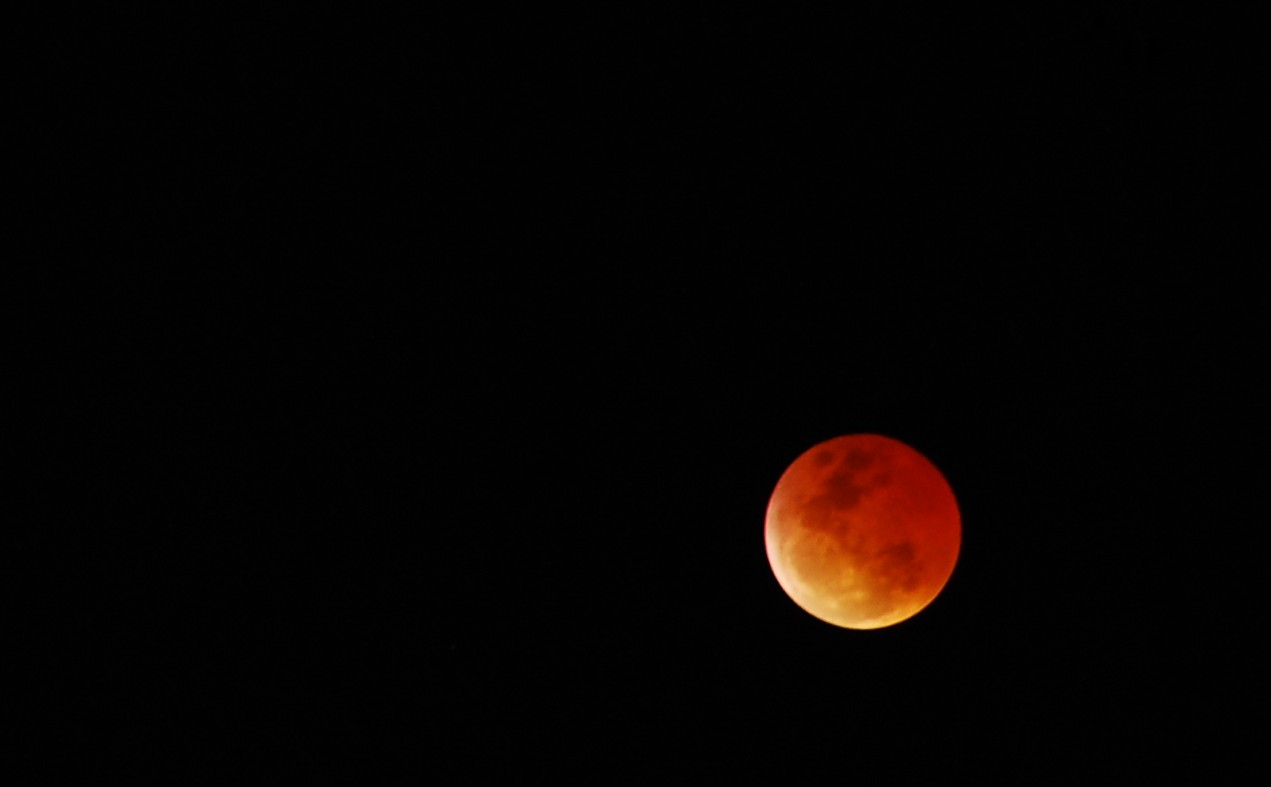
Humacao, Puerto Rico, 07:43 EST

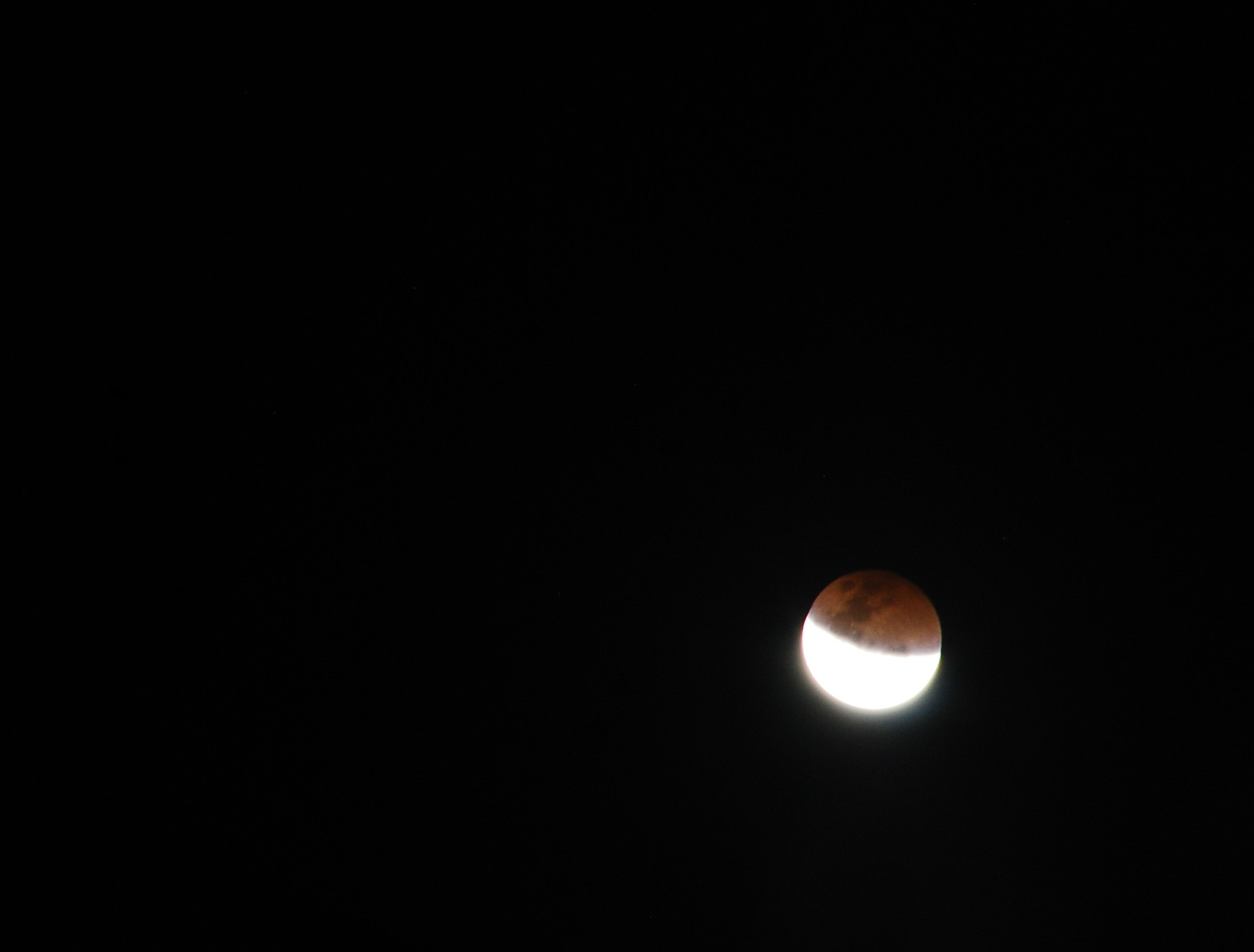
Humacao, Puerto Rico, 08:30:16 EST

== Eclipse details ==
Shown below is a table displaying details about this particular lunar eclipse. It describes various parameters pertaining to this eclipse.

3 March 2007 Lunar Eclipse Parameters
Parameter	Value
Penumbral Magnitude	2.32076
Umbral Magnitude	1.23474
Gamma	0.31749
Sun Right Ascension	22h57m19.2s
Sun Declination	-06°40'46.3"
Sun Semi-Diameter	16'08.0"
Sun Equatorial Horizontal Parallax	08.9"
Moon Right Ascension	10h57m52.2s
Moon Declination	+06°56'00.7"
Moon Semi-Diameter	14'51.3"
Moon Equatorial Horizontal Parallax	0°54'31.1"
ΔT	65.2 s

== Eclipse season ==
This eclipse is part of an eclipse season, a period, roughly every six months, when eclipses occur. Only two (or occasionally three) eclipse seasons occur each year, and each season lasts about 35 days and repeats just short of six months (173 days) later; thus two full eclipse seasons always occur each year. Either two or three eclipses happen each eclipse season. In the sequence below, each eclipse is separated by a fortnight.

Eclipse season of March 2007
3 March Descending node (full moon)	March 19 Ascending node (new moon)
Total lunar eclipse Lunar Saros 123	Partial solar eclipse Solar Saros 149

== Related eclipses ==
=== Eclipses in 2007 ===
- A total lunar eclipse on 3 March.
- A partial solar eclipse on March 19.
- A total lunar eclipse on August 28.
- A partial solar eclipse on September 11.

=== Metonic ===
- Preceded by: Lunar eclipse of May 16, 2003
- Followed by: Lunar eclipse of December 21, 2010

=== Tzolkinex ===
- Preceded by: Lunar eclipse of January 21, 2000
- Followed by: Lunar eclipse of April 15, 2014

=== Half-Saros ===
- Preceded by: Solar eclipse of February 26, 1998
- Followed by: Solar eclipse of March 9, 2016

=== Tritos ===
- Preceded by: Lunar eclipse of April 4, 1996
- Followed by: Lunar eclipse of January 31, 2018

=== Lunar Saros 123 ===
- Preceded by: Lunar eclipse of February 20, 1989
- Followed by: Lunar eclipse of March 14, 2025

=== Inex ===
- Preceded by: Lunar eclipse of March 24, 1978
- Followed by: Lunar eclipse of February 11, 2036

=== Triad ===
- Preceded by: Lunar eclipse of May 3, 1920
- Followed by: Lunar eclipse of January 1, 2094

=== Lunar eclipses of 2006–2009 ===
This eclipse is a member of a semester series. An eclipse in a semester series of lunar eclipses repeats approximately every 177 days and 4 hours (a semester) at alternating nodes of the Moon's orbit.

The lunar eclipses on July 7, 2009 (penumbral) and December 31, 2009 (partial) occur in the next lunar year eclipse set.

Lunar eclipse series sets from 2006 to 2009
Descending node				Ascending node			
Saros	Date Viewing	Type Chart	Gamma	Saros	Date Viewing	Type Chart	Gamma
113	2006 Mar 14	Penumbral	1.0211	118	2006 Sep 7	Partial	−0.9262
123	2007 Mar 03	Total	0.3175	128	2007 Aug 28	Total	−0.2146
133	2008 Feb 21	Total	−0.3992	138	2008 Aug 16	Partial	0.5646
143	2009 Feb 09	Penumbral	−1.0640	148	2009 Aug 06	Penumbral	1.3572

=== Metonic series ===
The Metonic cycle repeats nearly exactly every 19 years and represents a Saros cycle plus one lunar year. Because it occurs on the same calendar date, the Earth's shadow will be in nearly the same location relative to the background stars.

1. 1988 Mar 03.675 – Partial (113); 2. 2007 Mar 03.972 – Total (123); 3. 2026 Mar 03.481 – Total (133); 4. 2045 Mar 03.320 – Penumbral (143)	1. 1988 Aug 27.461 – partial (118); 2. 2007 Aug 28.442 – total (128); 3. 2026 Aug 28.175 – partial (138); 4. 2045 Aug 27.578 – penumbral (148)

=== Saros 123 ===
This eclipse is a part of Saros series 123, repeating every 18 years, 11 days, and containing 72 events. The series started with a penumbral lunar eclipse on August 16, 1087. It contains partial eclipses from May 2, 1520 through July 6, 1610; total eclipses from July 16, 1628 through April 4, 2061; and a second set of partial eclipses from April 16, 2079 through July 2, 2205. The series ends at member 72 as a penumbral eclipse on October 8, 2367.

The longest duration of totality was produced by member 37 at 105 minutes, 58 seconds on September 20, 1736. All eclipses in this series occur at the Moon’s descending node of orbit.

Greatest	First			
The greatest eclipse of the series occurred on 1736 Sep 20, lasting 105 minutes, 58 seconds.	Penumbral	Partial	Total	Central
The greatest eclipse of the series occurred on 1736 Sep 20, lasting 105 minutes, 58 seconds.	1087 Aug 16	1520 May 02	1628 Jul 16	1682 Aug 18
The greatest eclipse of the series occurred on 1736 Sep 20, lasting 105 minutes, 58 seconds.	Last			
The greatest eclipse of the series occurred on 1736 Sep 20, lasting 105 minutes, 58 seconds.	Central	Total	Partial	Penumbral
The greatest eclipse of the series occurred on 1736 Sep 20, lasting 105 minutes, 58 seconds.	1953 Jan 29	2061 Apr 04	2205 Jul 02	2367 Oct 08

Eclipses are tabulated in three columns; every third eclipse in the same column is one exeligmos apart, so they all cast shadows over approximately the same parts of the Earth.

Series members 41–62 occur between 1801 and 2200:
41	42	43
1808 Nov 03	1826 Nov 14	1844 Nov 24
44	45	46
1862 Dec 06	1880 Dec 16	1898 Dec 27
47	48	49
1917 Jan 08	1935 Jan 19	1953 Jan 29
50	51	52
1971 Feb 10	1989 Feb 20	2007 Mar 03
53	54	55
2025 Mar 14	2043 Mar 25	2061 Apr 04
56	57	58
2079 Apr 16	2097 Apr 26	2115 May 08
59	60	61
2133 May 19	2151 May 30	2169 Jun 09
62
2187 Jun 20

=== Tritos series ===
This eclipse is a part of a tritos cycle, repeating at alternating nodes every 135 synodic months (≈ 3986.63 days, or 11 years minus 1 month). Their appearance and longitude are irregular due to a lack of synchronization with the anomalistic month (period of perigee), but groupings of 3 tritos cycles (≈ 33 years minus 3 months) come close (≈ 434.044 anomalistic months), so eclipses are similar in these groupings.

Series members between 1801 and 2200
1810 Sep 13 (Saros 105)	1821 Aug 13 (Saros 106)	1832 Jul 12 (Saros 107)	1843 Jun 12 (Saros 108)	1854 May 12 (Saros 109)
1865 Apr 11 (Saros 110)	1876 Mar 10 (Saros 111)	1887 Feb 08 (Saros 112)	1898 Jan 08 (Saros 113)	1908 Dec 07 (Saros 114)
1919 Nov 07 (Saros 115)	1930 Oct 07 (Saros 116)	1941 Sep 05 (Saros 117)	1952 Aug 05 (Saros 118)	1963 Jul 06 (Saros 119)
1974 Jun 04 (Saros 120)	1985 May 04 (Saros 121)	1996 Apr 04 (Saros 122)	2007 Mar 03 (Saros 123)	2018 Jan 31 (Saros 124)
2028 Dec 31 (Saros 125)	2039 Nov 30 (Saros 126)	2050 Oct 30 (Saros 127)	2061 Sep 29 (Saros 128)	2072 Aug 28 (Saros 129)
2083 Jul 29 (Saros 130)	2094 Jun 28 (Saros 131)	2105 May 28 (Saros 132)	2116 Apr 27 (Saros 133)	2127 Mar 28 (Saros 134)
2138 Feb 24 (Saros 135)	2149 Jan 23 (Saros 136)	2159 Dec 24 (Saros 137)	2170 Nov 23 (Saros 138)	2181 Oct 22 (Saros 139)
2192 Sep 21 (Saros 140)

=== Inex series ===
This eclipse is a part of the long period inex cycle, repeating at alternating nodes, every 358 synodic months (≈ 10,571.95 days, or 29 years minus 20 days). Their appearance and longitude are irregular due to a lack of synchronization with the anomalistic month (period of perigee). However, groupings of 3 inex cycles (≈ 87 years minus 2 months) comes close (≈ 1,151.02 anomalistic months), so eclipses are similar in these groupings.

Series members between 1801 and 2200
1804 Jul 22 (Saros 116)	1833 Jul 02 (Saros 117)	1862 Jun 12 (Saros 118)
1891 May 23 (Saros 119)	1920 May 03 (Saros 120)	1949 Apr 13 (Saros 121)
1978 Mar 24 (Saros 122)	2007 Mar 03 (Saros 123)	2036 Feb 11 (Saros 124)
2065 Jan 22 (Saros 125)	2094 Jan 01 (Saros 126)	2122 Dec 13 (Saros 127)
2151 Nov 24 (Saros 128)	2180 Nov 02 (Saros 129)	

=== Half-Saros cycle ===
A lunar eclipse will be preceded and followed by solar eclipses by 9 years and 5.5 days (a half saros). This lunar eclipse is related to two total solar eclipses of Solar Saros 130.

February 26, 1998	March 9, 2016

== See also ==
- List of lunar eclipses and List of 21st-century lunar eclipses
