= Solar eclipse of September 11, 2007 =

Partial solar eclipse September 11, 2007

- Partial eclipse
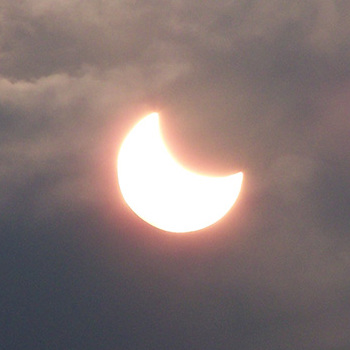
- From Córdoba, Argentina

- Map
- Gamma: −1.1255
- Magnitude: 0.7507

Maximum eclipse
- Coordinates: 61°S 90.2°W

Times (UTC)
- Greatest eclipse: 12:32:24

References
- Saros: 154 (6 of 71)
- Catalog # (SE5000): 9524

A partial solar eclipse occurred at the Moon’s descending node of orbit on Tuesday, September 11, 2007, with a magnitude of 0.7507. A solar eclipse occurs when the Moon passes between Earth and the Sun, thereby totally or partly obscuring the image of the Sun for a viewer on Earth. A partial solar eclipse occurs in the polar regions of the Earth when the center of the Moon's shadow misses the Earth.

A partial eclipse was visible for parts of central and southern South America, the Antarctic Peninsula, and east Antarctica.

== Eclipse timing ==
=== Places experiencing partial eclipse ===
Solar Eclipse of September 11, 2007 (Local Times)
| Country or territory | City or place | Start of partial eclipse | Maximum eclipse | End of partial eclipse | Duration of eclipse (hr:min) | Maximum coverage |
|---|---|---|---|---|---|---|
| Brazil | Rio Branco | 05:31:10 | 06:02:10 | 06:35:01 | 1:07 | 4.32% |
| Peru | Lima | 06:05:26 (sunrise) | 06:09:57 | 06:40:50 | 0:35 | 6.56% |
| Bolivia | La Paz | 06:31:18 (sunrise) | 07:11:12 | 08:00:34 | 1:29 | 14.70% |
| Bolivia | Cochabamba | 06:25:42 | 07:12:57 | 08:04:37 | 1:41 | 16.09% |
| Bolivia | Sucre | 06:25:50 | 07:15:48 | 08:10:36 | 1:45 | 18.85% |
| Brazil | Brasília | 07:36:00 | 08:19:06 | 09:05:28 | 1:29 | 7.44% |
| Brazil | Salvador | 08:06:04 | 08:21:17 | 08:36:52 | 0:31 | 0.23% |
| Argentina | Salta | 07:28:49 | 08:25:35 | 09:28:27 | 2:00 | 28.94% |
| Paraguay | Asunción | 06:31:20 | 07:30:24 | 08:35:49 | 2:04 | 26.98% |
| Paraguay | Ciudad del Este | 06:33:11 | 07:32:52 | 08:38:49 | 2:06 | 25.70% |
| Brazil | São Paulo | 07:38:43 | 08:35:18 | 09:37:05 | 1:58 | 17.25% |
| Brazil | Rio de Janeiro | 07:43:06 | 08:37:18 | 09:35:59 | 1:53 | 13.61% |
| Argentina | Córdoba | 07:35:58 | 08:38:39 | 09:48:15 | 2:12 | 39.26% |
| Argentina | Mendoza | 07:40:09 (sunrise) | 08:39:24 | 09:48:18 | 2:08 | 42.81% |
| Chile | Santiago | 06:47:35 (sunrise) | 07:39:46 | 08:48:18 | 2:01 | 43.99% |
| Uruguay | Rivera | 07:38:43 | 08:43:07 | 09:54:24 | 2:16 | 34.18% |
| Brazil | Criciúma | 07:40:40 | 08:43:36 | 09:52:46 | 2:12 | 26.57% |
| Argentina | Rosario | 07:39:05 | 08:43:47 | 09:55:34 | 2:16 | 39.98% |
| Uruguay | Tacuarembó | 07:39:34 | 08:44:29 | 09:56:21 | 2:17 | 35.60% |
| Brazil | Porto Alegre | 07:40:40 | 08:44:49 | 09:55:30 | 2:15 | 29.91% |
| Argentina | Buenos Aires | 07:42:28 | 08:48:45 | 10:02:07 | 2:20 | 40.93% |
| Uruguay | Montevideo | 07:44:06 | 08:51:02 | 10:04:57 | 2:21 | 39.92% |
| Argentina | Neuquén | 07:46:19 | 08:51:53 | 10:04:22 | 2:18 | 50.70% |
| Argentina | Mar del Plata | 07:48:20 | 08:56:33 | 10:11:45 | 2:23 | 44.52% |
| Chile | Punta Arenas | 07:12:00 | 08:20:18 | 09:34:03 | 2:22 | 62.92% |
| Falkland Islands | Stanley | 08:13:56 | 09:25:21 | 10:42:04 | 2:28 | 55.81% |
| Antarctica | Carlini Base | 08:35:10 | 09:45:35 | 10:59:29 | 2:24 | 58.75% |
| South Georgia and the South Sandwich Islands | King Edward Point | 09:38:16 | 10:49:55 | 12:04:06 | 2:26 | 38.41% |
| Antarctica | Marambio Base | 08:40:16 | 09:50:28 | 11:03:42 | 2:23 | 57.56% |
| Antarctica | Orcadas Base | 08:41:19 | 09:52:58 | 11:07:16 | 2:26 | 49.27% |

== Gallery ==
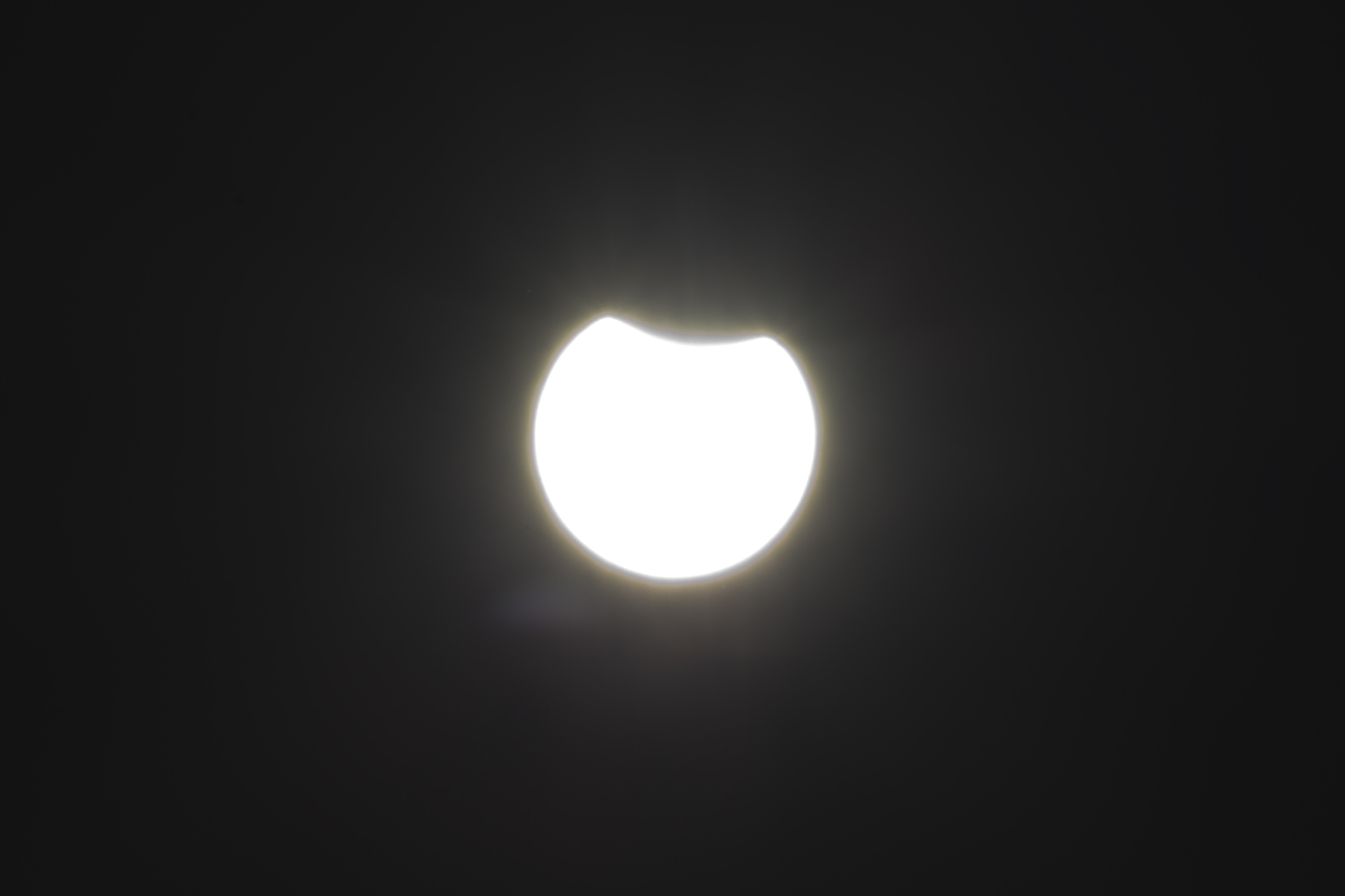
Niterói, Brazil, 11:21 UTC

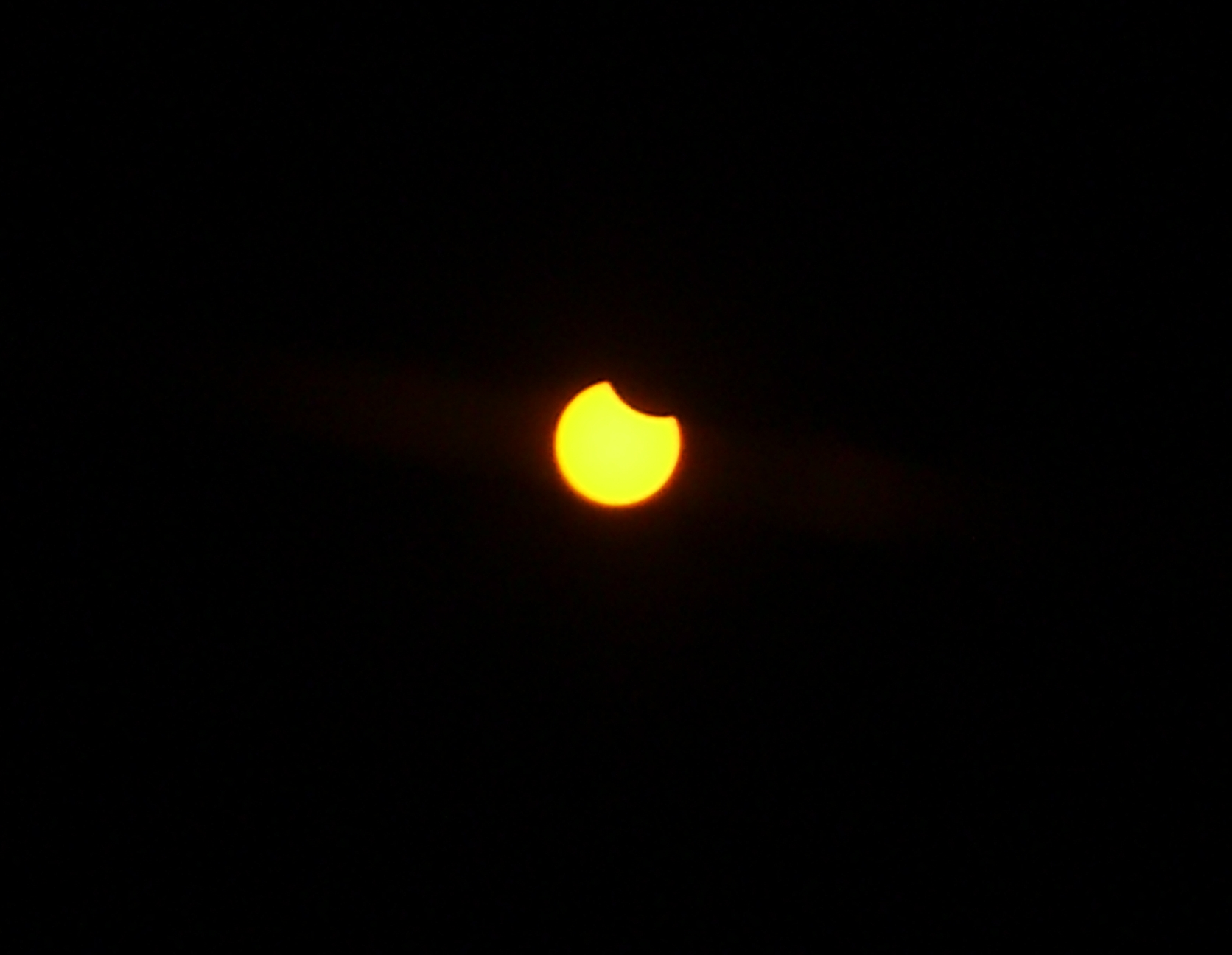
Rio de Janeiro, Brazil, 11:40 UTC

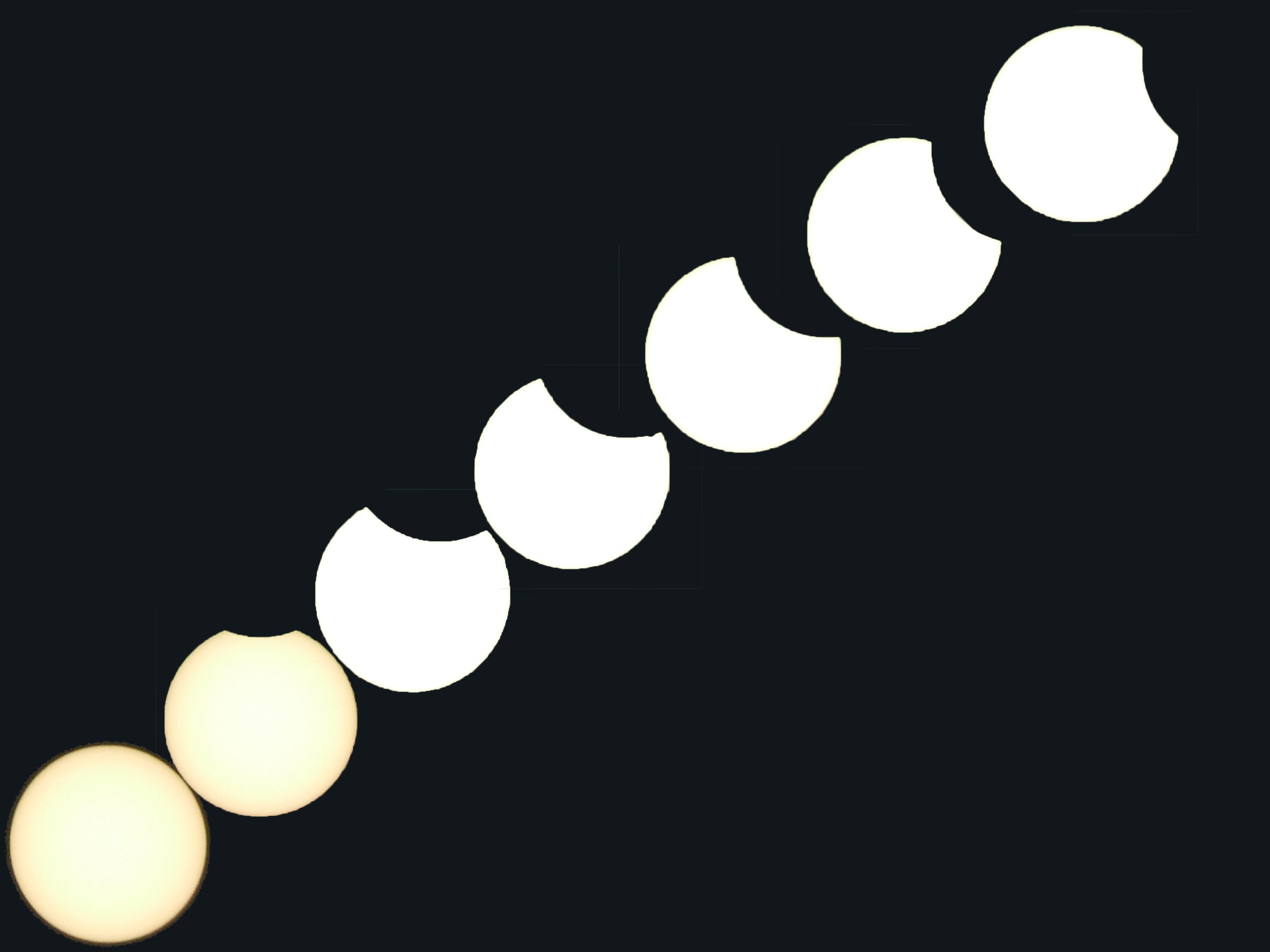
Composition from Campinas, Brazil

== Eclipse details ==
Shown below are two tables displaying details about this particular solar eclipse. The first table outlines times at which the Moon's penumbra or umbra attains the specific parameter, and the second table describes various other parameters pertaining to this eclipse.

September 11, 2007 Solar Eclipse Times
| Event | Time (UTC) |
|---|---|
| First Penumbral External Contact | 2007 September 11 at 10:26:47.9 UTC |
| Greatest Eclipse | 2007 September 11 at 12:32:24.5 UTC |
| Ecliptic Conjunction | 2007 September 11 at 12:45:19.4 UTC |
| Equatorial Conjunction | 2007 September 11 at 13:43:46.3 UTC |
| Last Penumbral External Contact | 2007 September 11 at 14:37:37.6 UTC |

September 11, 2007 Solar Eclipse Parameters
| Parameter | Value |
|---|---|
| Eclipse Magnitude | 0.75070 |
| Eclipse Obscuration | 0.67189 |
| Gamma | −1.12552 |
| Sun Right Ascension | 11h17m20.8s |
| Sun Declination | +04°35'13.3" |
| Sun Semi-Diameter | 15'53.2" |
| Sun Equatorial Horizontal Parallax | 08.7" |
| Moon Right Ascension | 11h15m21.9s |
| Moon Declination | +03°40'57.3" |
| Moon Semi-Diameter | 15'00.5" |
| Moon Equatorial Horizontal Parallax | 0°55'05.0" |
| ΔT | 65.3 s |

== Eclipse season ==
This eclipse is part of an eclipse season, a period, roughly every six months, when eclipses occur. Only two (or occasionally three) eclipse seasons occur each year, and each season lasts about 35 days and repeats just short of six months (173 days) later; thus two full eclipse seasons always occur each year. Either two or three eclipses happen each eclipse season. In the sequence below, each eclipse is separated by a fortnight.

Eclipse season of August–September 2007
| August 28 Ascending node (full moon) | September 11 Descending node (new moon) |
|---|---|
| Total lunar eclipse Lunar Saros 128 | Partial solar eclipse Solar Saros 154 |

== Related eclipses ==
=== Eclipses in 2007 ===
- A total lunar eclipse on March 3.
- A partial solar eclipse on March 19.
- A total lunar eclipse on August 28.
- A partial solar eclipse on September 11.

=== Metonic ===
- Preceded by: Solar eclipse of November 23, 2003
- Followed by: Solar eclipse of July 1, 2011

=== Tzolkinex ===
- Preceded by: Solar eclipse of July 31, 2000
- Followed by: Solar eclipse of October 23, 2014

=== Half-Saros ===
- Preceded by: Lunar eclipse of September 6, 1998
- Followed by: Lunar eclipse of September 16, 2016

=== Tritos ===
- Preceded by: Solar eclipse of October 12, 1996
- Followed by: Solar eclipse of August 11, 2018

=== Solar Saros 154 ===
- Preceded by: Solar eclipse of August 31, 1989
- Followed by: Solar eclipse of September 21, 2025

=== Inex ===
- Preceded by: Solar eclipse of October 2, 1978
- Followed by: Solar eclipse of August 21, 2036

=== Triad ===
- Preceded by: Solar eclipse of November 10, 1920
- Followed by: Solar eclipse of July 12, 2094

=== Solar eclipses of 2004–2007 ===
This eclipse is a member of a semester series. An eclipse in a semester series of solar eclipses repeats approximately every 177 days and 4 hours (a semester) at alternating nodes of the Moon's orbit.

Solar eclipse series sets from 2004 to 2007
| Ascending node | | | Descending node | | |
| Saros | Map | Gamma | Saros | Map | Gamma |
| 119 | April 19, 2004 Partial | −1.13345 | 124 | October 14, 2004 Partial | 1.03481 |
| 129 Partial in Naiguatá, Venezuela | April 8, 2005 Hybrid | −0.34733 | 134 Annularity in Madrid, Spain | October 3, 2005 Annular | 0.33058 |
| 139 Totality in Side, Turkey | March 29, 2006 Total | 0.38433 | 144 Partial in São Paulo, Brazil | September 22, 2006 Annular | −0.40624 |
| 149 Partial in Jaipur, India | March 19, 2007 Partial | 1.07277 | 154 Partial in Córdoba, Argentina | September 11, 2007 Partial | −1.12552 |

=== Saros 154 ===
This eclipse is a part of Saros series 154, repeating every 18 years, 11 days, and containing 71 events. The series started with a partial solar eclipse on July 19, 1917. It contains annular eclipses from October 3, 2043, through March 27, 2332; hybrid eclipses from April 7, 2350 through April 29, 2386; and total eclipses from May 9, 2404 through May 29, 3035. The series ends at member 71 as a partial eclipse on August 25, 3179. Its eclipses are tabulated in three columns; every third eclipse in the same column is one exeligmos apart, so they all cast shadows over approximately the same parts of the Earth.

The longest duration of annularity will be produced by member 9 at 3 minutes, 41 seconds on October 13, 2061, and the longest duration of totality will be produced by member 35 at 4 minutes, 50 seconds on July 25, 2530. All eclipses in this series occur at the Moon’s descending node of orbit.

Series members 1–16 occur between 1917 and 2200:
| 1 | 2 | 3 |
|---|---|---|
| July 19, 1917 | July 30, 1935 | August 9, 1953 |
| 4 | 5 | 6 |
| August 20, 1971 | August 31, 1989 | September 11, 2007 |
| 7 | 8 | 9 |
| September 21, 2025 | October 3, 2043 | October 13, 2061 |
| 10 | 11 | 12 |
| October 24, 2079 | November 4, 2097 | November 16, 2115 |
| 13 | 14 | 15 |
| November 26, 2133 | December 8, 2151 | December 18, 2169 |
16
December 29, 2187

=== Metonic series ===
The metonic series repeats eclipses every 19 years (6939.69 days), lasting about 5 cycles. Eclipses occur in nearly the same calendar date. In addition, the octon subseries repeats 1/5 of that or every 3.8 years (1387.94 days). All eclipses in this table occur at the Moon's descending node.

22 eclipse events between September 12, 1931 and July 1, 2011
| September 11–12 | June 30–July 1 | April 17–19 | February 4–5 | November 22–23 |
| 114 | 116 | 118 | 120 | 122 |
|---|---|---|---|---|
| September 12, 1931 | June 30, 1935 | April 19, 1939 | February 4, 1943 | November 23, 1946 |
| 124 | 126 | 128 | 130 | 132 |
| September 12, 1950 | June 30, 1954 | April 19, 1958 | February 5, 1962 | November 23, 1965 |
| 134 | 136 | 138 | 140 | 142 |
| September 11, 1969 | June 30, 1973 | April 18, 1977 | February 4, 1981 | November 22, 1984 |
| 144 | 146 | 148 | 150 | 152 |
| September 11, 1988 | June 30, 1992 | April 17, 1996 | February 5, 2000 | November 23, 2003 |
| 154 | 156 | | | |
| September 11, 2007 | July 1, 2011 | | | |

=== Tritos series ===
This eclipse is a part of a tritos cycle, repeating at alternating nodes every 135 synodic months (≈ 3986.63 days, or 11 years minus 1 month). Their appearance and longitude are irregular due to a lack of synchronization with the anomalistic month (period of perigee), but groupings of 3 tritos cycles (≈ 33 years minus 3 months) come close (≈ 434.044 anomalistic months), so eclipses are similar in these groupings.

The partial solar eclipse on November 4, 2116 (part of Saros 164) is also a part of this series but is not included in the table below.

Series members between 1801 and 2029
| March 24, 1811 (Saros 136) | February 21, 1822 (Saros 137) | January 20, 1833 (Saros 138) | December 21, 1843 (Saros 139) | November 20, 1854 (Saros 140) |
| October 19, 1865 (Saros 141) | September 17, 1876 (Saros 142) | August 19, 1887 (Saros 143) | July 18, 1898 (Saros 144) | June 17, 1909 (Saros 145) |
| May 18, 1920 (Saros 146) | April 18, 1931 (Saros 147) | March 16, 1942 (Saros 148) | February 14, 1953 (Saros 149) | January 14, 1964 (Saros 150) |
| December 13, 1974 (Saros 151) | November 12, 1985 (Saros 152) | October 12, 1996 (Saros 153) | September 11, 2007 (Saros 154) | August 11, 2018 (Saros 155) |
July 11, 2029 (Saros 156)

=== Inex series ===
This eclipse is a part of the long period inex cycle, repeating at alternating nodes, every 358 synodic months (≈ 10,571.95 days, or 29 years minus 20 days). Their appearance and longitude are irregular due to a lack of synchronization with the anomalistic month (period of perigee). However, groupings of 3 inex cycles (≈ 87 years minus 2 months) comes close (≈ 1,151.02 anomalistic months), so eclipses are similar in these groupings.

Series members between 1801 and 2200
| January 30, 1805 (Saros 147) | January 9, 1834 (Saros 148) | December 21, 1862 (Saros 149) |
| December 1, 1891 (Saros 150) | November 10, 1920 (Saros 151) | October 21, 1949 (Saros 152) |
| October 2, 1978 (Saros 153) | September 11, 2007 (Saros 154) | August 21, 2036 (Saros 155) |
| August 2, 2065 (Saros 156) | July 12, 2094 (Saros 157) | June 23, 2123 (Saros 158) |
| June 3, 2152 (Saros 159) | May 13, 2181 (Saros 160) | |
