= Solar eclipse of March 19, 2007 =

21st-century partial solar eclipse

- Partial eclipse
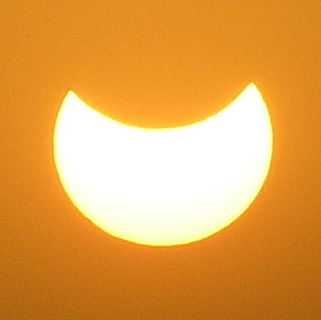
- From Jaipur, India at sunrise

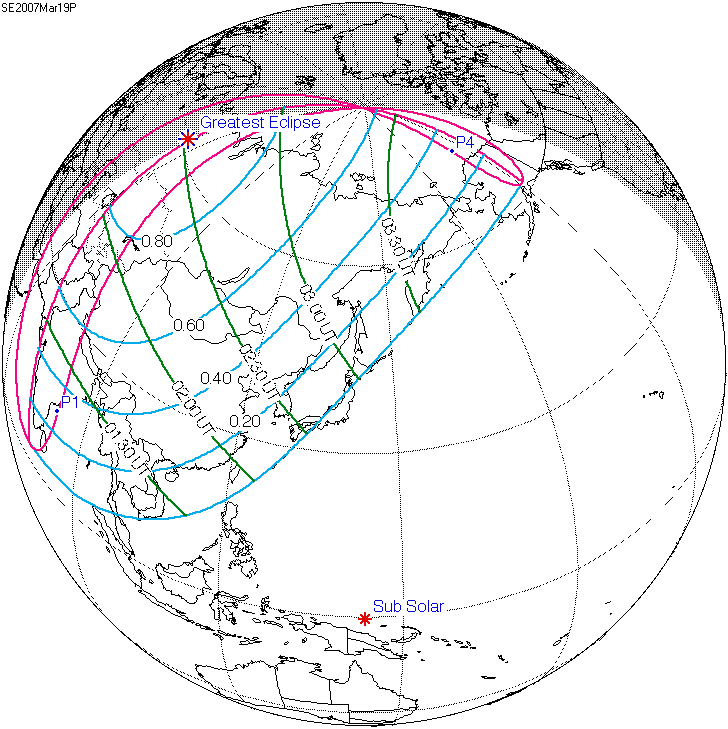
- Map
- Gamma: 1.0728
- Magnitude: 0.8756

Maximum eclipse
- Coordinates: 61°N 55.5°E

Times (UTC)
- Greatest eclipse: 2:32:57

References
- Saros: 149 (20 of 71)
- Catalog # (SE5000): 9523

A partial solar eclipse occurred at the Moon's ascending node of orbit on Monday, March 19, 2007, with a magnitude of 0.8756. A solar eclipse occurs when the Moon passes between Earth and the Sun, thereby totally or partly obscuring the image of the Sun for a viewer on Earth. A partial solar eclipse occurs in the polar regions of the Earth when the center of the Moon's shadow misses the Earth.

This partial eclipse was visible from India at sunrise, across Asia and the eastern part of European Russia, and ending near sunset over northern Alaska. The greatest eclipse was seen in the north of Perm Krai, Russia.

== Eclipse timing ==
=== Places experiencing partial eclipse ===
Solar eclipse of March 19, 2007 (local times)
Country or territory	City or place	Start of partial eclipse	Maximum eclipse	End of partial eclipse	Duration of eclipse (hr:min)	Maximum coverage
Thailand	Bangkok	07:47:36	08:21:23	08:56:56	1:09	7.36%
Myanmar	Yangon	07:12:53	07:53:59	08:37:47	1:25	15.37%
India	Kolkata	06:11:50	06:59:53	07:51:37	1:40	31.33%
Bangladesh	Dhaka	06:43:19	07:32:31	08:25:32	1:42	32.40%
India	New Delhi	06:27:03 (sunrise)	07:06:44	08:00:56	1:34	47.83%
Vietnam	Hanoi	07:53:36	08:37:07	09:23:19	1:30	14.60%
Nepal	Kathmandu	06:30:45	07:22:13	08:17:47	1:47	43.06%
Bhutan	Thimphu	06:46:32	07:38:29	08:34:34	1:48	40.07%
Pakistan	Islamabad	06:13:49 (sunrise)	06:44:29	07:40:10	1:26	58.30%
Afghanistan	Kabul	05:59:24 (sunrise)	06:15:33	07:10:25	1:11	60.18%
Hong Kong	Hong Kong	09:08:46	09:46:43	10:26:25	1:18	7.70%
Tajikistan	Dushanbe	06:31:05 (sunrise)	06:52:14	07:48:29	1:17	66.92%
Turkmenistan	Türkmenabat	06:51:54 (sunrise)	06:54:40	07:47:54	0:56	67.62%
Uzbekistan	Tashkent	06:29:10 (sunrise)	06:56:58	07:54:09	1:25	70.82%
Kyrgyzstan	Bishkek	07:07:59 (sunrise)	08:00:38	08:59:39	1:52	71.67%
Kazakhstan	Almaty	07:06:09	08:01:54	09:01:38	1:55	71.34%
China	Ürümqi	09:09:00	10:07:14	11:09:33	2:01	66.12%
Iran	Mashhad	05:37:40 (sunrise)	05:40:20	06:11:35	0:34	40.05%
China	Shanghai	09:29:29	10:12:11	10:56:25	1:27	9.88%
Kazakhstan	Astana	07:20:48 (sunrise)	08:15:02	09:14:18	1:54	80.18%
Turkmenistan	Ashgabat	07:12:35 (sunrise)	07:15:19	07:44:35	0:32	37.68%
Mongolia	Khovd	08:17:46	09:17:21	10:20:39	2:03	66.93%
Russia	Omsk	07:25:59	08:22:40	09:22:30	1:57	81.53%
China	Beijing	09:27:28	10:23:10	11:21:16	1:54	28.33%
Russia	Yekaterinburg	07:04:08 (sunrise)	07:24:04	08:21:11	1:17	84.50%
Mongolia	Ulaanbaatar	09:27:54	10:28:29	11:32:01	2:04	50.76%
South Korea	Seoul	10:47:30	11:31:12	12:15:55	1:28	10.21%
North Korea	Pyongyang	10:45:09	11:32:22	12:20:49	1:36	13.62%
Russia	Izhevsk	06:33:40 (sunrise)	06:37:35	07:19:37	0:46	66.58%
Russia	Samara	06:45:58 (sunrise)	06:49:33	07:12:22	0:26	29.39%

== Gallery ==
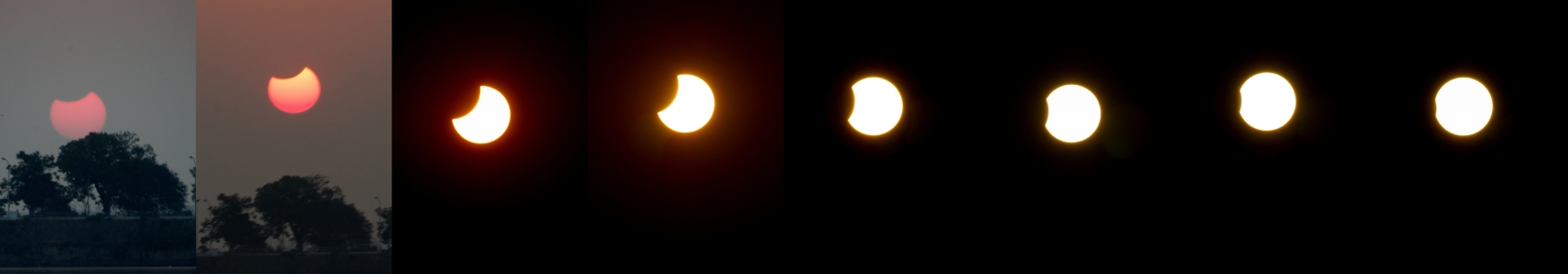
Eclipse progression from Hyderabad, India
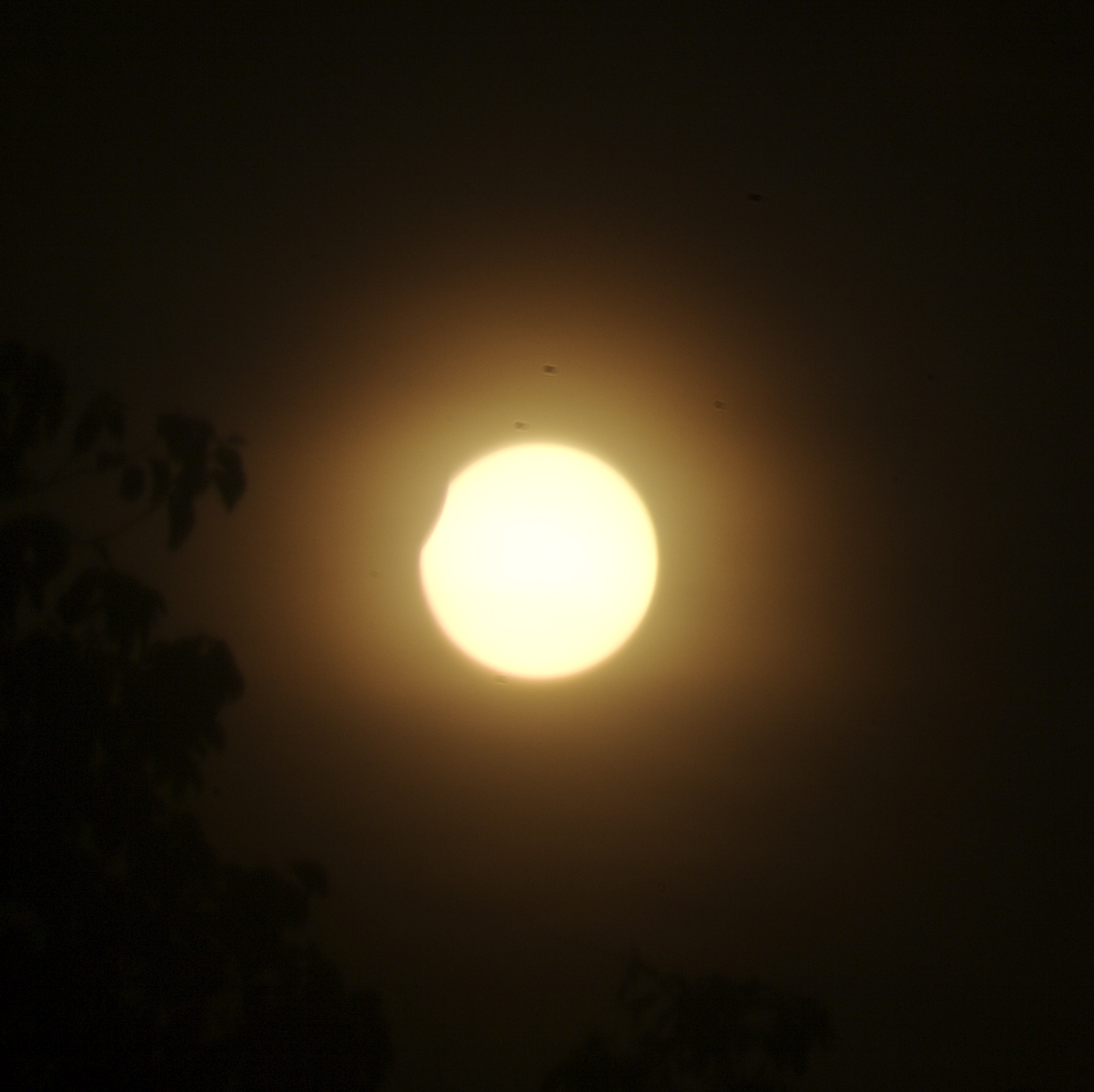
Maharagama, Sri Lanka, 1:03 UTC

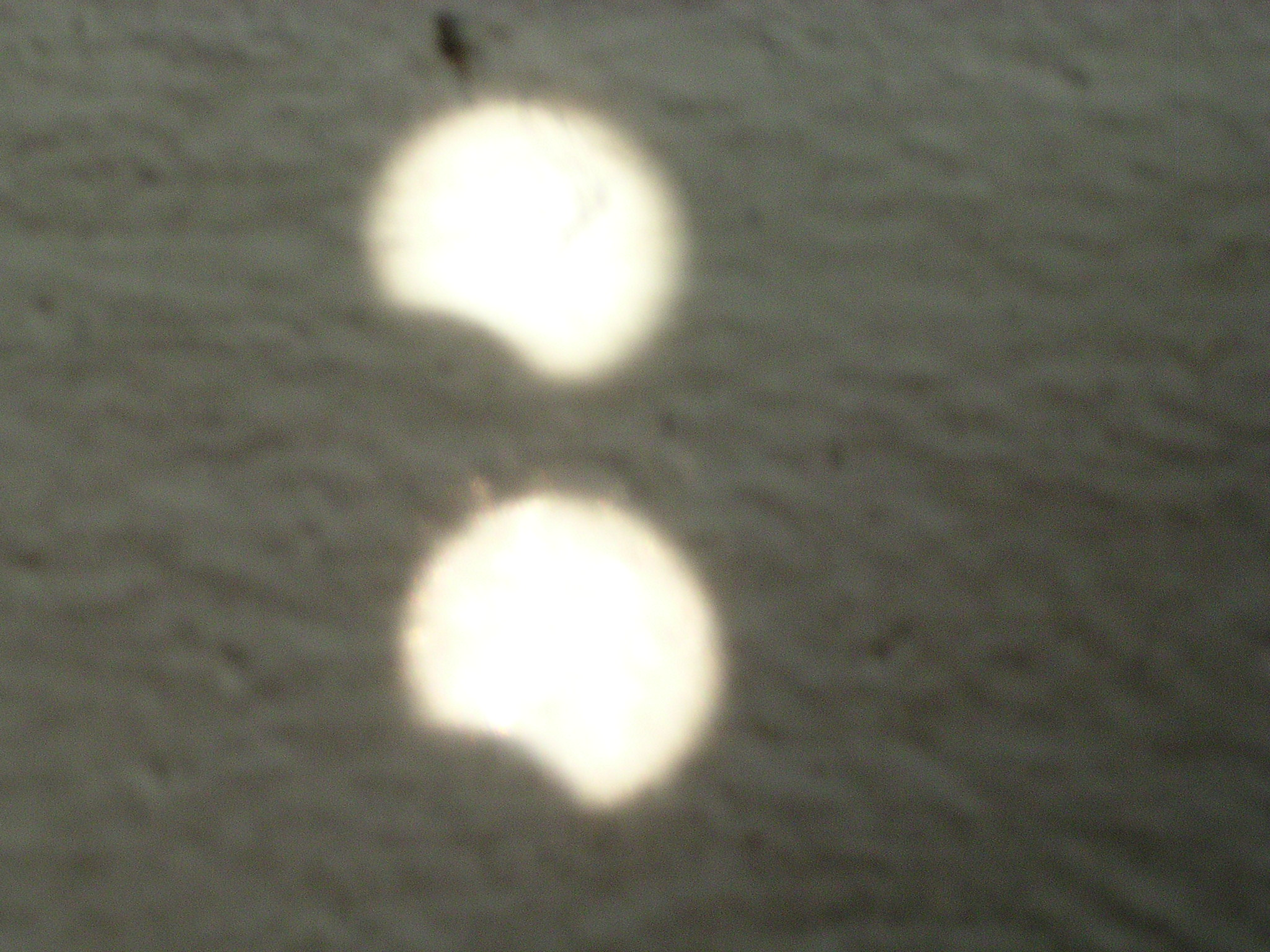
Eclipse shadow from Khon Kaen, Thailand, 1:28 UTC

== Eclipse details ==
Shown below are two tables displaying details about this particular solar eclipse. The first table outlines times at which the Moon's penumbra or umbra attains the specific parameter, and the second table describes various other parameters pertaining to this eclipse.

March 19, 2007 solar eclipse times
Event	Time (UTC)
First penumbral external contact	2007 March 19 at 00:39:26.5 UTC
Greatest eclipse	2007 March 19 at 02:32:57.5 UTC
Ecliptic conjunction	2007 March 19 at 02:43:39.1 UTC
Equatorial conjunction	2007 March 19 at 03:34:11.6 UTC
Last penumbral external contact	2007 March 19 at 04:26:02.2 UTC

March 19, 2007 solar eclipse parameters
Parameter	Value
Eclipse magnitude	0.87558
Eclipse obscuration	0.85148
Gamma	1.07277
Sun right ascension	23h53m04.0s
Sun declination	-00°45'04.8"
Sun semi-diameter	16'04.0"
Sun equatorial horizontal parallax	08.8"
Moon right ascension	23h50m57.2s
Moon declination	+00°12'14.7"
Moon semi-diameter	16'40.7"
Moon equatorial horizontal parallax	1°01'12.5"
ΔT	65.2 s

== Eclipse season ==
This eclipse is part of an eclipse season, a period, roughly every six months, when eclipses occur. Only two (or occasionally three) eclipse seasons occur each year, and each season lasts about 35 days and repeats just short of six months (173 days) later; thus two full eclipse seasons always occur each year. Either two or three eclipses happen each eclipse season. In the sequence below, each eclipse is separated by a fortnight.

Eclipse season of March 2007
March 3 Descending node (full moon)	March 19 Ascending node (new moon)
Total lunar eclipse Lunar Saros 123	Partial solar eclipse Solar Saros 149

== Related eclipses ==
=== Eclipses in 2007 ===
- A total lunar eclipse on March 3
- A partial solar eclipse on March 19
- A total lunar eclipse on August 28
- A partial solar eclipse on September 11

=== Metonic ===
- Preceded by: Solar eclipse of May 31, 2003
- Followed by: Solar eclipse of January 4, 2011

=== Tzolkinex ===
- Preceded by: Solar eclipse of February 5, 2000
- Followed by: Solar eclipse of April 29, 2014

=== Half-Saros ===
- Preceded by: Lunar eclipse of March 13, 1998
- Followed by: Lunar eclipse of March 23, 2016

=== Tritos ===
- Preceded by: Solar eclipse of April 17, 1996
- Followed by: Solar eclipse of February 15, 2018

=== Solar Saros 149 ===
- Preceded by: Solar eclipse of March 7, 1989
- Followed by: Solar eclipse of March 29, 2025

=== Inex ===
- Preceded by: Solar eclipse of April 7, 1978
- Followed by: Solar eclipse of February 27, 2036

=== Triad ===
- Preceded by: Solar eclipse of May 18, 1920
- Followed by: Solar eclipse of January 16, 2094

=== Solar eclipses of 2004–2007 ===
This eclipse is a member of a semester series. An eclipse in a semester series of solar eclipses repeats approximately every 177 days and 4 hours (a semester) at alternating nodes of the Moon's orbit.

Solar eclipse series sets from 2004 to 2007
Ascending node			Descending node		
Saros	Map	Gamma	Saros	Map	Gamma
119	April 19, 2004 Partial	−1.13345	124	October 14, 2004 Partial	1.03481
129 Partial in Naiguatá, Venezuela	April 8, 2005 Hybrid	−0.34733	134 Annularity in Madrid, Spain	October 3, 2005 Annular	0.33058
139 Totality in Side, Turkey	March 29, 2006 Total	0.38433	144 Partial in São Paulo, Brazil	September 22, 2006 Annular	−0.40624
149 Partial in Jaipur, India	March 19, 2007 Partial	1.07277	154 Partial in Córdoba, Argentina	September 11, 2007 Partial	−1.12552

=== Saros 149 ===
This eclipse is a part of Saros series 149, repeating every 18 years, 11 days, 8 hours and containing 71 events. The series started with a partial solar eclipse on August 21, 1664. It contains total eclipses from April 9, 2043 through October 2, 2331; hybrid eclipses from October 13, 2349 through November 3, 2385; and annular eclipses from November 15, 2403 through July 13, 2800. The series ends at member 71 as a partial eclipse on September 28, 2926. Its eclipses are tabulated in three columns; every third eclipse in the same column is one exeligmos apart, so they all cast shadows over approximately the same parts of the Earth.

The longest duration of totality will be produced by member 31 at 4 minutes, 10 seconds on July 17, 2205, and the longest duration of annularity will be produced by member 62 at 5 minutes, 6 seconds on June 21, 2764. All eclipses in this series occur at the Moon’s ascending node of orbit.

Series members 9–30 occur between 1801 and 2200:
9	10	11
November 18, 1808	November 29, 1826	December 9, 1844
12	13	14
December 21, 1862	December 31, 1880	January 11, 1899
15	16	17
January 23, 1917	February 3, 1935	February 14, 1953
18	19	20
February 25, 1971	March 7, 1989	March 19, 2007
21	22	23
March 29, 2025	April 9, 2043	April 20, 2061
24	25	26
May 1, 2079	May 11, 2097	May 24, 2115
27	28	29
June 3, 2133	June 14, 2151	June 25, 2169
30
July 6, 2187

=== Metonic series ===
The metonic series repeats eclipses every 19 years (6939.69 days), lasting about 5 cycles. Eclipses occur in nearly the same calendar date. In addition, the octon subseries repeats 1/5 of that or every 3.8 years (1387.94 days). All eclipses in this table occur at the Moon's ascending node.

22 eclipse events between January 5, 1935 and August 11, 2018
January 4–5	October 23–24	August 10–12	May 30–31	March 18–19
111	113	115	117	119
January 5, 1935		August 12, 1942	May 30, 1946	March 18, 1950
121	123	125	127	129
January 5, 1954	October 23, 1957	August 11, 1961	May 30, 1965	March 18, 1969
131	133	135	137	139
January 4, 1973	October 23, 1976	August 10, 1980	May 30, 1984	March 18, 1988
141	143	145	147	149
January 4, 1992	October 24, 1995	August 11, 1999	May 31, 2003	March 19, 2007
151	153	155		
January 4, 2011	October 23, 2014	August 11, 2018		

=== Tritos series ===
This eclipse is a part of a tritos cycle, repeating at alternating nodes every 135 synodic months (≈ 3986.63 days, or 11 years minus 1 month). Their appearance and longitude are irregular due to a lack of synchronization with the anomalistic month (period of perigee), but groupings of 3 tritos cycles (≈ 33 years minus 3 months) come close (≈ 434.044 anomalistic months), so eclipses are similar in these groupings.

The partial solar eclipses on December 7, 2170 (part of Saros 164) and November 7, 2181 (part of Saros 165) are also a part of this series but are not included in the table below.

Series members between 1801 and 2105
September 28, 1810 (Saros 131)	August 27, 1821 (Saros 132)	July 27, 1832 (Saros 133)	June 27, 1843 (Saros 134)	May 26, 1854 (Saros 135)
April 25, 1865 (Saros 136)	March 25, 1876 (Saros 137)	February 22, 1887 (Saros 138)	January 22, 1898 (Saros 139)	December 23, 1908 (Saros 140)
November 22, 1919 (Saros 141)	October 21, 1930 (Saros 142)	September 21, 1941 (Saros 143)	August 20, 1952 (Saros 144)	July 20, 1963 (Saros 145)
June 20, 1974 (Saros 146)	May 19, 1985 (Saros 147)	April 17, 1996 (Saros 148)	March 19, 2007 (Saros 149)	February 15, 2018 (Saros 150)
January 14, 2029 (Saros 151)	December 15, 2039 (Saros 152)	November 14, 2050 (Saros 153)	October 13, 2061 (Saros 154)	September 12, 2072 (Saros 155)
August 13, 2083 (Saros 156)	July 12, 2094 (Saros 157)	June 12, 2105 (Saros 158)		

=== Inex series ===
This eclipse is a part of the long period inex cycle, repeating at alternating nodes, every 358 synodic months (≈ 10,571.95 days, or 29 years minus 20 days). Their appearance and longitude are irregular due to a lack of synchronization with the anomalistic month (period of perigee). However, groupings of 3 inex cycles (≈ 87 years minus 2 months) comes close (≈ 1,151.02 anomalistic months), so eclipses are similar in these groupings.

Series members between 1801 and 2200
August 5, 1804 (Saros 142)	July 17, 1833 (Saros 143)	June 27, 1862 (Saros 144)
June 6, 1891 (Saros 145)	May 18, 1920 (Saros 146)	April 28, 1949 (Saros 147)
April 7, 1978 (Saros 148)	March 19, 2007 (Saros 149)	February 27, 2036 (Saros 150)
February 5, 2065 (Saros 151)	January 16, 2094 (Saros 152)	December 28, 2122 (Saros 153)
December 8, 2151 (Saros 154)	November 17, 2180 (Saros 155)	
