= Solar eclipse of January 14, 2029 =

Future partial solar eclipse

- Partial eclipse
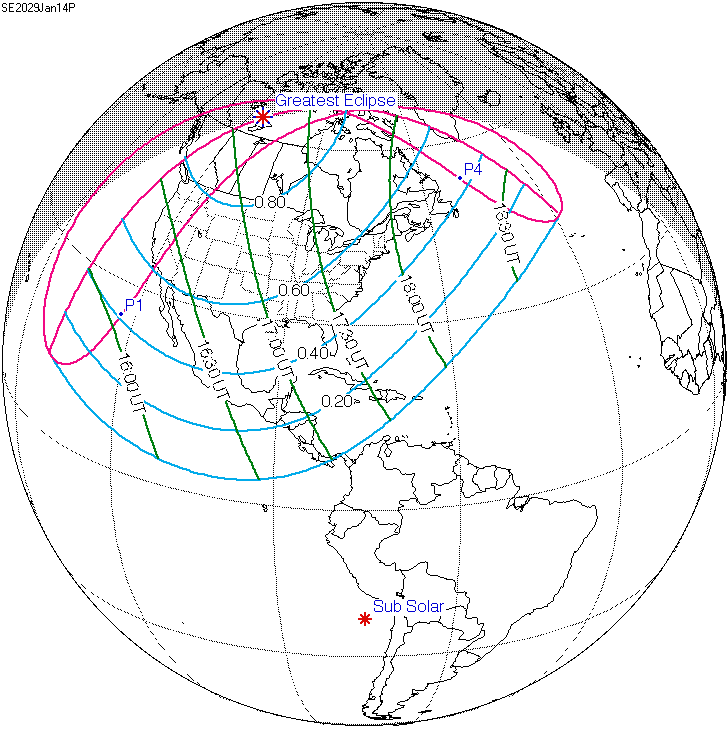
- Map
- Gamma: 1.0553
- Magnitude: 0.8714

Maximum eclipse
- Coordinates: 63.7°N 114.2°W

Times (UTC)
- Greatest eclipse: 17:13:48

References
- Saros: 151 (15 of 72)
- Catalog # (SE5000): 9571

A partial solar eclipse will occur at the Moon's ascending node of orbit on Sunday, January 14, 2029, with a magnitude of 0.8714. A solar eclipse occurs when the Moon passes between Earth and the Sun, thereby totally or partly obscuring the image of the Sun for a viewer on Earth. A partial solar eclipse occurs in the polar regions of the Earth when the center of the Moon's shadow misses the Earth.

This will be the first of four partial solar eclipses in 2029, with the others occurring on June 12, July 11, and December 5.

A partial eclipse will be visible for parts of North America and Central America.

== Images ==
Animated path

== Eclipse timing ==
=== Places experiencing partial eclipse ===
Solar Eclipse of January 14, 2029 (Local Times)
Country or territory	City or place	Start of partial eclipse	Maximum eclipse	End of partial eclipse	Duration of eclipse (hr:min)	Maximum coverage
United States	Los Angeles	07:07:44	08:21:27	09:45:34	2:38	51.73%
United States	San Francisco	07:24:01 (sunrise)	08:22:24	09:44:30	2:20	56.34%
Mexico	Mexico City	09:18:20	10:33:43	11:56:57	2:39	25.90%
United States	Seattle	07:53:13 (sunrise)	08:38:39	10:01:32	2:08	71.10%
Guatemala	Guatemala City	09:39:07	10:46:15	11:56:50	2:18	13.18%
El Salvador	San Salvador	09:44:08	10:48:03	11:54:42	2:11	10.81%
Nicaragua	Managua	09:56:44	10:52:34	11:49:48	1:53	6.54%
Honduras	Tegucigalpa	09:49:31	10:53:03	11:58:34	2:09	10.20%
Canada	Calgary	08:34:33	09:53:35	11:19:18	2:46	76.68%
Belize	Belmopan	09:41:02	10:53:43	12:09:19	2:28	16.80%
Canada	Edmonton	08:42:36 (sunrise)	09:58:08	11:22:52	2:40	78.56%
United States	New Orleans	09:38:40	11:07:28	12:39:09	3:00	41.33%
Cayman Islands	George Town	11:02:58	12:13:34	13:23:41	2:21	13.76%
Cuba	Havana	10:57:18	12:16:26	13:35:01	2:38	21.42%
Jamaica	Kingston	11:23:56	12:22:11	13:19:04	1:55	7.10%
United States	Atlanta	10:54:46	12:24:29	13:53:26	2:59	42.27%
United States	Chicago	09:55:07	11:25:38	12:56:24	3:01	57.88%
Bahamas	Nassau	11:13:56	12:30:12	13:43:49	2:30	18.82%
Haiti	Port-au-Prince	11:46:06	12:32:45	13:17:53	1:32	3.60%
United States	Detroit	11:04:56	12:34:47	14:02:52	2:58	53.97%
Dominican Republic	Santo Domingo	13:02:12	13:37:48	14:12:19	1:10	1.60%
Canada	Toronto	11:13:55	12:42:20	14:07:41	2:54	51.77%
United States	Washington, D.C.	11:16:38	12:43:49	14:07:04	2:50	41.78%
Canada	Ottawa	11:23:02	12:49:25	14:11:51	2:49	50.02%
United States	New York City	11:25:06	12:50:21	14:11:00	2:46	40.79%
Canada	Montreal	11:27:45	12:52:55	14:13:39	2:46	47.60%
Bermuda	Hamilton	12:56:10	14:01:52	15:02:58	2:07	14.51%
Greenland	Nuuk	14:58:35	16:08:37	16:17:03 (sunset)	1:18	50.82%
Saint Pierre and Miquelon	Saint-Pierre	14:06:43	15:16:35	16:21:22	2:15	28.53%
Canada	St. John's	13:43:25	14:50:01	15:51:50	2:08	25.97%

== Eclipse details ==
Shown below are two tables displaying details about this particular solar eclipse. The first table outlines times at which the Moon's penumbra or umbra attains the specific parameter, and the second table describes various other parameters pertaining to this eclipse.

January 14, 2029 Solar Eclipse Times
Event	Time (UTC)
First Penumbral External Contact	2029 January 14 at 15:03:08.9 UTC
Greatest Eclipse	2029 January 14 at 17:13:47.5 UTC
Ecliptic Conjunction	2029 January 14 at 17:25:40.8 UTC
Equatorial Conjunction	2029 January 14 at 17:48:06.7 UTC
Last Penumbral External Contact	2029 January 14 at 19:24:17.6 UTC

January 14, 2029 Solar Eclipse Parameters
Parameter	Value
Eclipse Magnitude	0.87140
Eclipse Obscuration	0.81600
Gamma	1.05532
Sun Right Ascension	19h47m03.1s
Sun Declination	-21°09'31.8"
Sun Semi-Diameter	16'15.6"
Sun Equatorial Horizontal Parallax	08.9"
Moon Right Ascension	19h45m53.5s
Moon Declination	-20°12'32.3"
Moon Semi-Diameter	15'20.6"
Moon Equatorial Horizontal Parallax	0°56'18.7"
ΔT	73.4 s

== Eclipse season ==
This eclipse is part of an eclipse season, a period, roughly every six months, when eclipses occur. Only two (or occasionally three) eclipse seasons occur each year, and each season lasts about 35 days and repeats just short of six months (173 days) later; thus two full eclipse seasons always occur each year. Either two or three eclipses happen each eclipse season. In the sequence below, each eclipse is separated by a fortnight.

Eclipse season of December 2028–January 2029
December 31 Descending node (full moon)	January 14 Ascending node (new moon)
Total lunar eclipse Lunar Saros 125	Partial solar eclipse Solar Saros 151

== Related eclipses ==
=== Eclipses in 2029 ===
- A partial solar eclipse on January 14.
- A partial solar eclipse on June 12.
- A total lunar eclipse on June 26.
- A partial solar eclipse on July 11.
- A partial solar eclipse on December 5.
- A total lunar eclipse on December 20.

=== Metonic ===
- Preceded by: Solar eclipse of March 29, 2025
- Followed by: Solar eclipse of November 3, 2032

=== Tzolkinex ===
- Preceded by: Solar eclipse of December 4, 2021
- Followed by: Solar eclipse of February 27, 2036

=== Half-Saros ===
- Preceded by: Lunar eclipse of January 10, 2020
- Followed by: Lunar eclipse of January 21, 2038

=== Tritos ===
- Preceded by: Solar eclipse of February 15, 2018
- Followed by: Solar eclipse of December 15, 2039

=== Solar Saros 151 ===
- Preceded by: Solar eclipse of January 4, 2011
- Followed by: Solar eclipse of January 26, 2047

=== Inex ===
- Preceded by: Solar eclipse of February 5, 2000
- Followed by: Solar eclipse of December 26, 2057

=== Triad ===
- Preceded by: Solar eclipse of March 16, 1942
- Followed by: Solar eclipse of November 16, 2115

=== Solar eclipses of 2026–2029 ===
This eclipse is a member of a semester series. An eclipse in a semester series of solar eclipses repeats approximately every 177 days and 4 hours (a semester) at alternating nodes of the Moon's orbit.

The partial solar eclipses on June 12, 2029 and December 5, 2029 occur in the next lunar year eclipse set.

Solar eclipse series sets from 2026 to 2029
Ascending node			Descending node		
Saros	Map	Gamma	Saros	Map	Gamma
121	February 17, 2026 Annular	−0.97427	126	August 12, 2026 Total	0.89774
131	February 6, 2027 Annular	−0.29515	136	August 2, 2027 Total	0.14209
141	January 26, 2028 Annular	0.39014	146	July 22, 2028 Total	−0.60557
151	January 14, 2029 Partial	1.05532	156	July 11, 2029 Partial	−1.41908

=== Saros 151 ===
This eclipse is a part of Saros series 151, repeating every 18 years, 11 days, and containing 72 events. The series started with a partial solar eclipse on August 14, 1776. It contains annular eclipses from February 28, 2101 through April 23, 2191; a hybrid eclipse on May 5, 2209; and total eclipses from May 16, 2227 through July 6, 2912. The series ends at member 72 as a partial eclipse on October 1, 3056. Its eclipses are tabulated in three columns; every third eclipse in the same column is one exeligmos apart, so they all cast shadows over approximately the same parts of the Earth.

The longest duration of annularity will be produced by member 19 at 2 minutes, 44 seconds on February 28, 2101, and the longest duration of totality will be produced by member 60 at 5 minutes, 41 seconds on May 22, 2840. All eclipses in this series occur at the Moon’s ascending node of orbit.

Series members 3–24 occur between 1801 and 2200:
3	4	5
September 5, 1812	September 17, 1830	September 27, 1848
6	7	8
October 8, 1866	October 19, 1884	October 31, 1902
9	10	11
November 10, 1920	November 21, 1938	December 2, 1956
12	13	14
December 13, 1974	December 24, 1992	January 4, 2011
15	16	17
January 14, 2029	January 26, 2047	February 5, 2065
18	19	20
February 16, 2083	February 28, 2101	March 11, 2119
21	22	23
March 21, 2137	April 2, 2155	April 12, 2173
24
April 23, 2191

=== Metonic series ===
The metonic series repeats eclipses every 19 years (6939.69 days), lasting about 5 cycles. Eclipses occur in nearly the same calendar date. In addition, the octon subseries repeats 1/5 of that or every 3.8 years (1387.94 days). All eclipses in this table occur at the Moon's ascending node.

20 eclipse events between June 10, 1964 and August 21, 2036
June 10–11	March 28–29	January 14–16	November 3	August 21–22
117	119	121	123	125
June 10, 1964	March 28, 1968	January 16, 1972	November 3, 1975	August 22, 1979
127	129	131	133	135
June 11, 1983	March 29, 1987	January 15, 1991	November 3, 1994	August 22, 1998
137	139	141	143	145
June 10, 2002	March 29, 2006	January 15, 2010	November 3, 2013	August 21, 2017
147	149	151	153	155
June 10, 2021	March 29, 2025	January 14, 2029	November 3, 2032	August 21, 2036

=== Tritos series ===
This eclipse is a part of a tritos cycle, repeating at alternating nodes every 135 synodic months (≈ 3986.63 days, or 11 years minus 1 month). Their appearance and longitude are irregular due to a lack of synchronization with the anomalistic month (period of perigee), but groupings of 3 tritos cycles (≈ 33 years minus 3 months) come close (≈ 434.044 anomalistic months), so eclipses are similar in these groupings.

The partial solar eclipses on December 7, 2170 (part of Saros 164) and November 7, 2181 (part of Saros 165) are also a part of this series but are not included in the table below.

Series members between 1801 and 2105
September 28, 1810 (Saros 131)	August 27, 1821 (Saros 132)	July 27, 1832 (Saros 133)	June 27, 1843 (Saros 134)	May 26, 1854 (Saros 135)
April 25, 1865 (Saros 136)	March 25, 1876 (Saros 137)	February 22, 1887 (Saros 138)	January 22, 1898 (Saros 139)	December 23, 1908 (Saros 140)
November 22, 1919 (Saros 141)	October 21, 1930 (Saros 142)	September 21, 1941 (Saros 143)	August 20, 1952 (Saros 144)	July 20, 1963 (Saros 145)
June 20, 1974 (Saros 146)	May 19, 1985 (Saros 147)	April 17, 1996 (Saros 148)	March 19, 2007 (Saros 149)	February 15, 2018 (Saros 150)
January 14, 2029 (Saros 151)	December 15, 2039 (Saros 152)	November 14, 2050 (Saros 153)	October 13, 2061 (Saros 154)	September 12, 2072 (Saros 155)
August 13, 2083 (Saros 156)	July 12, 2094 (Saros 157)	June 12, 2105 (Saros 158)		

=== Inex series ===
This eclipse is a part of the long period inex cycle, repeating at alternating nodes, every 358 synodic months (≈ 10,571.95 days, or 29 years minus 20 days). Their appearance and longitude are irregular due to a lack of synchronization with the anomalistic month (period of perigee). However, groupings of 3 inex cycles (≈ 87 years minus 2 months) comes close (≈ 1,151.02 anomalistic months), so eclipses are similar in these groupings.

Series members between 1801 and 2200
June 5, 1826 (Saros 144)	May 16, 1855 (Saros 145)	April 25, 1884 (Saros 146)
April 6, 1913 (Saros 147)	March 16, 1942 (Saros 148)	February 25, 1971 (Saros 149)
February 5, 2000 (Saros 150)	January 14, 2029 (Saros 151)	December 26, 2057 (Saros 152)
December 6, 2086 (Saros 153)	November 16, 2115 (Saros 154)	October 26, 2144 (Saros 155)
October 7, 2173 (Saros 156)		
