= July 1999 lunar eclipse =

Partial lunar eclipse July 28, 1999

- Partial eclipse
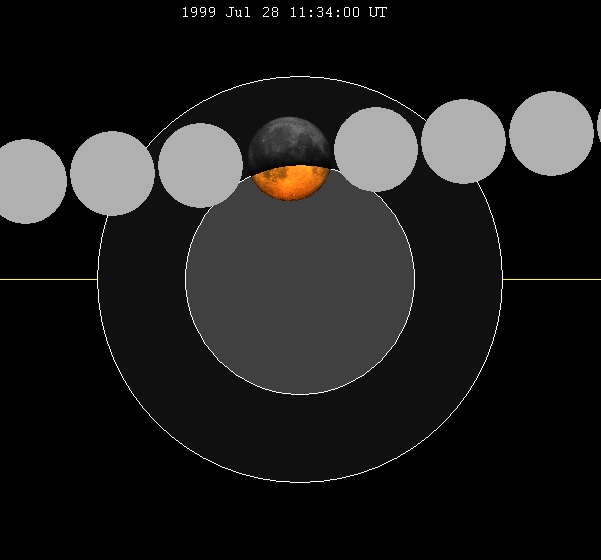
- The Moon's hourly motion shown right to left
- Date: July 28, 1999
- Gamma: 0.7863
- Magnitude: 0.3966
- Saros cycle: 119 (61 of 83)
- Partiality: 142 minutes, 32 seconds
- Penumbral: 310 minutes, 56 seconds
Contacts (UTC)
- P1: 8:58:15
- U1: 10:22:31
- Greatest: 11:33:43
- U4: 12:45:03
- P4: 14:09:11

A partial lunar eclipse occurred at the Moon’s descending node of orbit on Wednesday, July 28, 1999, with an umbral magnitude of 0.3966. A lunar eclipse occurs when the Moon moves into the Earth's shadow, causing the Moon to be darkened. A partial lunar eclipse occurs when one part of the Moon is in the Earth's umbra, while the other part is in the Earth's penumbra. Unlike a solar eclipse, which can only be viewed from a relatively small area of the world, a lunar eclipse may be viewed from anywhere on the night side of Earth. Occurring about 5.2 days after apogee (on July 23, 1999, at 6:45 UTC), the Moon's apparent diameter was smaller.

== Visibility ==
The eclipse was completely visible over eastern Australia, Antarctica, and much of the Pacific Ocean, seen rising over east and southeast Asia and western Australia and setting over much of North and South America.

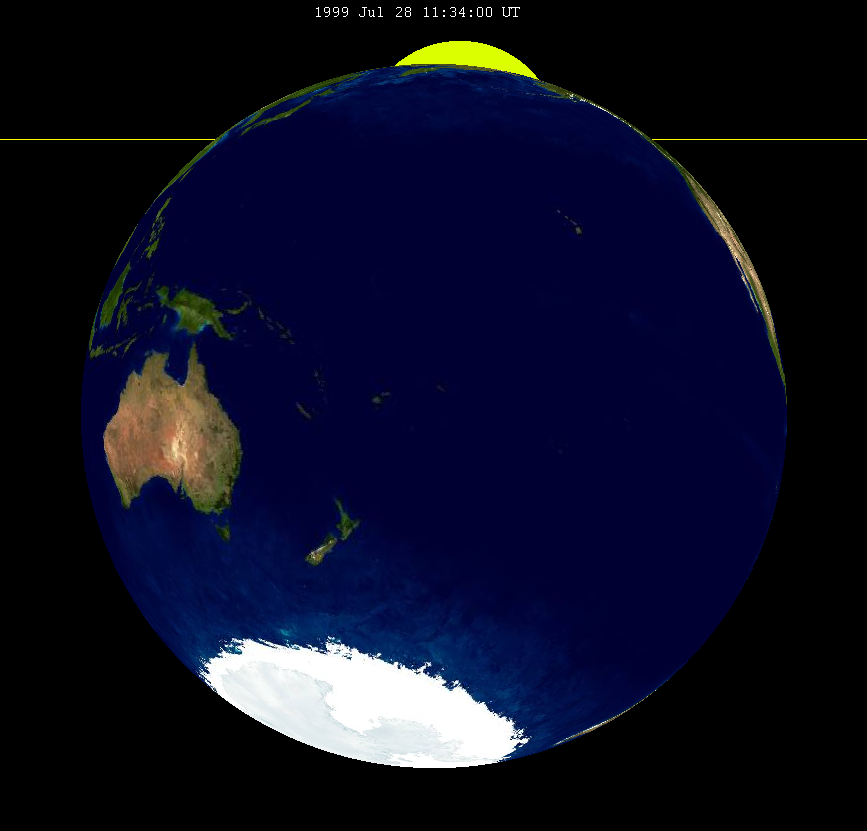
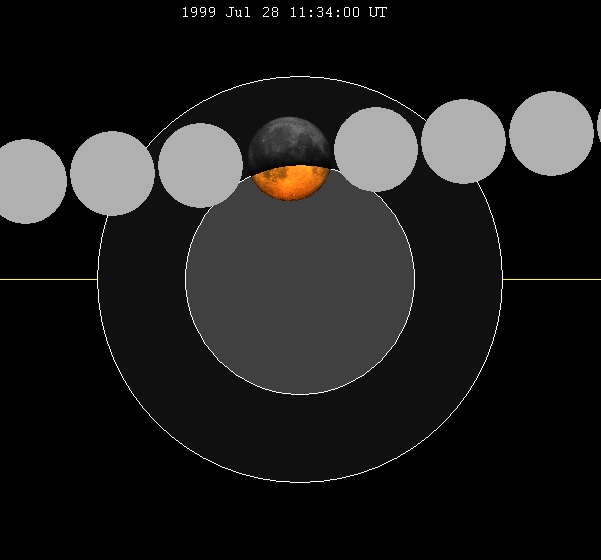

== Eclipse details ==
Shown below is a table displaying details about this particular solar eclipse. It describes various parameters pertaining to this eclipse.

July 28, 1999 Lunar Eclipse Parameters
| Parameter | Value |
|---|---|
| Penumbral Magnitude | 1.43423 |
| Umbral Magnitude | 0.39658 |
| Gamma | 0.78630 |
| Sun Right Ascension | 08h29m15.8s |
| Sun Declination | +19°01'23.5" |
| Sun Semi-Diameter | 15'45.0" |
| Sun Equatorial Horizontal Parallax | 08.7" |
| Moon Right Ascension | 20h28m49.2s |
| Moon Declination | -18°18'03.0" |
| Moon Semi-Diameter | 15'10.7" |
| Moon Equatorial Horizontal Parallax | 0°55'42.5" |
| ΔT | 63.7 s |

== Eclipse season ==
This eclipse is part of an eclipse season, a period, roughly every six months, when eclipses occur. Only two (or occasionally three) eclipse seasons occur each year, and each season lasts about 35 days and repeats just short of six months (173 days) later; thus two full eclipse seasons always occur each year. Either two or three eclipses happen each eclipse season. In the sequence below, each eclipse is separated by a fortnight.

Eclipse season of July–August 1999
| July 28 Descending node (full moon) | August 11 Ascending node (new moon) |
|---|---|
| Partial lunar eclipse Lunar Saros 119 | Total solar eclipse Solar Saros 145 |

== Related eclipses ==
=== Eclipses in 1999 ===
- A penumbral lunar eclipse on January 31.
- An annular solar eclipse on February 16.
- A partial lunar eclipse on July 28.
- A total solar eclipse on August 11.

=== Metonic ===
- Preceded by: Lunar eclipse of October 8, 1995
- Followed by: Lunar eclipse of May 16, 2003

=== Tzolkinex ===
- Preceded by: Lunar eclipse of June 15, 1992
- Followed by: Lunar eclipse of September 7, 2006

=== Half-Saros ===
- Preceded by: Solar eclipse of July 22, 1990
- Followed by: Solar eclipse of August 1, 2008

=== Tritos ===
- Preceded by: Lunar eclipse of August 27, 1988
- Followed by: Lunar eclipse of June 26, 2010

=== Lunar Saros 119 ===
- Preceded by: Lunar eclipse of July 17, 1981
- Followed by: Lunar eclipse of August 7, 2017

=== Inex ===
- Preceded by: Lunar eclipse of August 17, 1970
- Followed by: Lunar eclipse of July 6, 2028

=== Triad ===
- Preceded by: Lunar eclipse of September 26, 1912
- Followed by: Lunar eclipse of May 28, 2086

=== Lunar eclipses of 1998–2002 ===
This eclipse is a member of a semester series. An eclipse in a semester series of lunar eclipses repeats approximately every 177 days and 4 hours (a semester) at alternating nodes of the Moon's orbit.

The penumbral lunar eclipses on March 13, 1998 and September 6, 1998 occur in the previous lunar year eclipse set, and the penumbral lunar eclipses on May 26, 2002 and November 20, 2002 occur in the next lunar year eclipse set.

Lunar eclipse series sets from 1998 to 2002
| Descending node | | | | Ascending node | | | |
| Saros | Date Viewing | Type Chart | Gamma | Saros | Date Viewing | Type Chart | Gamma |
| 109 | 1998 Aug 08 | Penumbral | 1.4876 | 114 | 1999 Jan 31 | Penumbral | −1.0190 |
| 119 | 1999 Jul 28 | Partial | 0.7863 | 124 | 2000 Jan 21 | Total | −0.2957 |
| 129 | 2000 Jul 16 | Total | 0.0302 | 134 | 2001 Jan 09 | Total | 0.3720 |
| 139 | 2001 Jul 05 | Partial | −0.7287 | 144 | 2001 Dec 30 | Penumbral | 1.0732 |
| 149 | 2002 Jun 24 | Penumbral | −1.4440 | | | | |

=== Saros 119 ===
This eclipse is a part of Saros series 119, repeating every 18 years, 11 days, and containing 82 events. The series started with a penumbral lunar eclipse on October 14, 935 AD. It contains partial eclipses from May 18, 1296 through August 2, 1422; total eclipses from August 13, 1440 through June 15, 1927; and a second set of partial eclipses from June 25, 1945 through August 19, 2035. The series ends at member 82 as a penumbral eclipse on March 25, 2396.

The longest duration of totality was produced by member 49 at 102 minutes, 6 seconds on March 30, 1801. All eclipses in this series occur at the Moon’s descending node of orbit.

| Greatest | First | | | |
|---|---|---|---|---|
| The greatest eclipse of the series occurred on 1801 Mar 30, lasting 102 minutes, 6 seconds. | Penumbral | Partial | Total | Central |
| The greatest eclipse of the series occurred on 1801 Mar 30, lasting 102 minutes, 6 seconds. | 934 Oct 14 | 1296 May 18 | 1440 Aug 13 | 1512 Sep 25 |
| The greatest eclipse of the series occurred on 1801 Mar 30, lasting 102 minutes, 6 seconds. | Last | | | |
| The greatest eclipse of the series occurred on 1801 Mar 30, lasting 102 minutes, 6 seconds. | Central | Total | Partial | Penumbral |
| The greatest eclipse of the series occurred on 1801 Mar 30, lasting 102 minutes, 6 seconds. | 1873 May 12 | 1927 Jun 15 | 2035 Aug 19 | 2396 Mar 25 |

Eclipses are tabulated in three columns; every third eclipse in the same column is one exeligmos apart, so they all cast shadows over approximately the same parts of the Earth.

Series members 49–71 occur between 1801 and 2200:
| 49 | 50 | 51 |
|---|---|---|
| 1801 Mar 30 | 1819 Apr 10 | 1837 Apr 20 |
| 52 | 53 | 54 |
| 1855 May 02 | 1873 May 12 | 1891 May 23 |
| 55 | 56 | 57 |
| 1909 Jun 04 | 1927 Jun 15 | 1945 Jun 25 |
| 58 | 59 | 60 |
| 1963 Jul 06 | 1981 Jul 17 | 1999 Jul 28 |
| 61 | 62 | 63 |
| 2017 Aug 07 | 2035 Aug 19 | 2053 Aug 29 |
| 64 | 65 | 66 |
| 2071 Sep 09 | 2089 Sep 19 | 2107 Oct 02 |
| 67 | 68 | 69 |
| 2125 Oct 12 | 2143 Oct 23 | 2161 Nov 03 |
| 70 | 71 | |
| 2179 Nov 14 | 2197 Nov 24 | |

=== Tritos series ===
This eclipse is a part of a tritos cycle, repeating at alternating nodes every 135 synodic months (≈ 3986.63 days, or 11 years minus 1 month). Their appearance and longitude are irregular due to a lack of synchronization with the anomalistic month (period of perigee), but groupings of 3 tritos cycles (≈ 33 years minus 3 months) come close (≈ 434.044 anomalistic months), so eclipses are similar in these groupings.

Series members between 1801 and 2200
| 1803 Feb 06 (Saros 101) | 1814 Jan 06 (Saros 102) | 1824 Dec 06 (Saros 103) | | 1846 Oct 04 (Saros 105) |
| 1857 Sep 04 (Saros 106) | 1868 Aug 03 (Saros 107) | 1879 Jul 03 (Saros 108) | 1890 Jun 03 (Saros 109) | 1901 May 03 (Saros 110) |
| 1912 Apr 01 (Saros 111) | 1923 Mar 03 (Saros 112) | 1934 Jan 30 (Saros 113) | 1944 Dec 29 (Saros 114) | 1955 Nov 29 (Saros 115) |
| 1966 Oct 29 (Saros 116) | 1977 Sep 27 (Saros 117) | 1988 Aug 27 (Saros 118) | 1999 Jul 28 (Saros 119) | 2010 Jun 26 (Saros 120) |
| 2021 May 26 (Saros 121) | 2032 Apr 25 (Saros 122) | 2043 Mar 25 (Saros 123) | 2054 Feb 22 (Saros 124) | 2065 Jan 22 (Saros 125) |
| 2075 Dec 22 (Saros 126) | 2086 Nov 20 (Saros 127) | 2097 Oct 21 (Saros 128) | 2108 Sep 20 (Saros 129) | 2119 Aug 20 (Saros 130) |
| 2130 Jul 21 (Saros 131) | 2141 Jun 19 (Saros 132) | 2152 May 18 (Saros 133) | 2163 Apr 19 (Saros 134) | 2174 Mar 18 (Saros 135) |
| 2185 Feb 14 (Saros 136) | 2196 Jan 15 (Saros 137) | | | |

=== Inex series ===
This eclipse is a part of the long period inex cycle, repeating at alternating nodes, every 358 synodic months (≈ 10,571.95 days, or 29 years minus 20 days). Their appearance and longitude are irregular due to a lack of synchronization with the anomalistic month (period of perigee). However, groupings of 3 inex cycles (≈ 87 years minus 2 months) comes close (≈ 1,151.02 anomalistic months), so eclipses are similar in these groupings.

Series members between 1801 and 2200
| 1825 Nov 25 (Saros 113) | 1854 Nov 04 (Saros 114) | 1883 Oct 16 (Saros 115) |
| 1912 Sep 26 (Saros 116) | 1941 Sep 05 (Saros 117) | 1970 Aug 17 (Saros 118) |
| 1999 Jul 28 (Saros 119) | 2028 Jul 06 (Saros 120) | 2057 Jun 17 (Saros 121) |
| 2086 May 28 (Saros 122) | 2115 May 08 (Saros 123) | 2144 Apr 18 (Saros 124) |
2173 Mar 29 (Saros 125)

=== Half-Saros cycle ===
A lunar eclipse will be preceded and followed by solar eclipses by 9 years and 5.5 days (a half saros). This lunar eclipse is related to two total solar eclipses of Solar Saros 126.

| July 22, 1990 | August 1, 2008 |

== See also ==
- List of lunar eclipses
- List of 20th-century lunar eclipses
