= June 1945 lunar eclipse =

Partial lunar eclipse June 25, 1945

- Partial eclipse
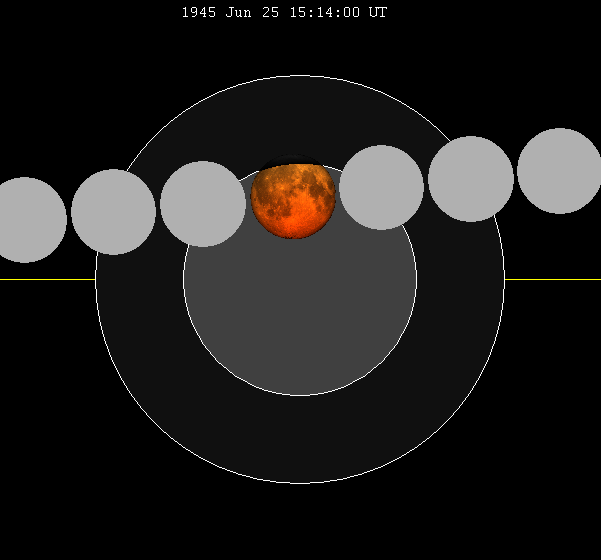
- The Moon's hourly motion shown right to left
- Date: June 25, 1945
- Gamma: 0.5370
- Magnitude: 0.8593
- Saros cycle: 119 (58 of 83)
- Partiality: 192 minutes, 42 seconds
- Penumbral: 333 minutes, 15 seconds
Contacts (UTC)
- P1: 12:27:15
- U1: 13:37:36
- Greatest: 15:13:55
- U4: 16:50:18
- P4: 18:00:30

A partial lunar eclipse occurred at the Moon’s descending node of orbit on Monday, June 25, 1945, with an umbral magnitude of 0.8593. A lunar eclipse occurs when the Moon moves into the Earth's shadow, causing the Moon to be darkened. A partial lunar eclipse occurs when one part of the Moon is in the Earth's umbra, while the other part is in the Earth's penumbra. Unlike a solar eclipse, which can only be viewed from a relatively small area of the world, a lunar eclipse may be viewed from anywhere on the night side of Earth. Occurring about 5.8 days after apogee (on June 19, 1945, at 19:30 UTC), the Moon's apparent diameter was smaller.

== Visibility ==
The eclipse was completely visible over east Asia, Australia, and Antarctica, seen rising over central and east Africa, the Middle East, and south and central Asia and setting over the eastern Pacific Ocean.

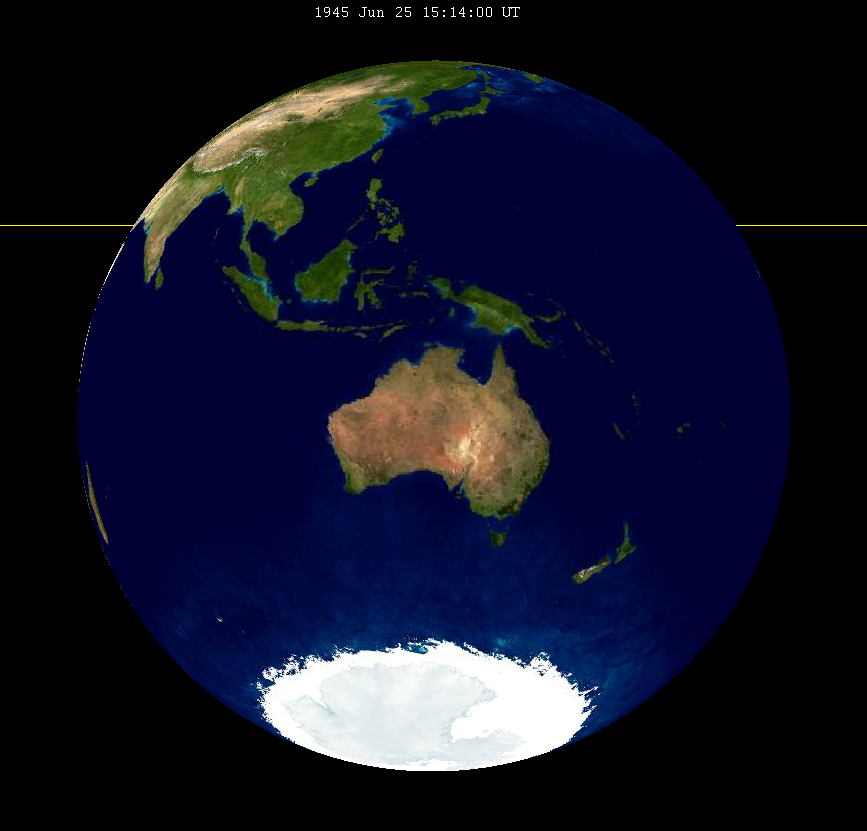
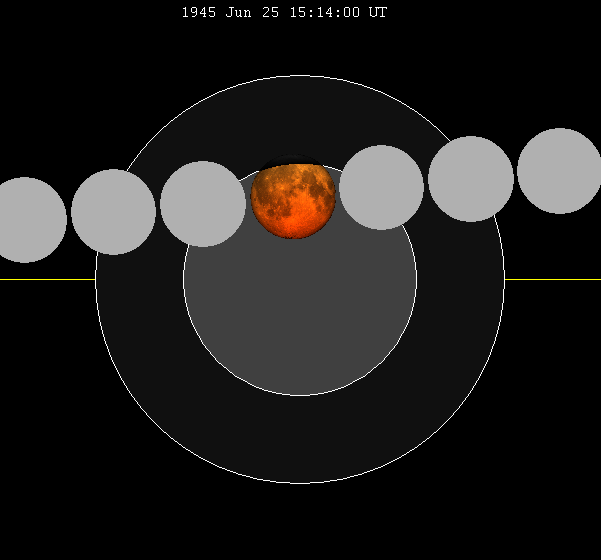

== Eclipse details ==
Shown below is a table displaying details about this particular lunar eclipse. It describes various parameters pertaining to this eclipse.

June 25, 1945 Lunar Eclipse Parameters
Parameter	Value
Penumbral Magnitude	1.88622
Umbral Magnitude	0.85932
Gamma	0.53701
Sun Right Ascension	06h15m59.8s
Sun Declination	+23°23'41.2"
Sun Semi-Diameter	15'44.0"
Sun Equatorial Horizontal Parallax	08.7"
Moon Right Ascension	18h16m09.1s
Moon Declination	-22°53'34.2"
Moon Semi-Diameter	15'19.3"
Moon Equatorial Horizontal Parallax	0°56'13.9"
ΔT	27.1 s

== Eclipse season ==
This eclipse is part of an eclipse season, a period, roughly every six months, when eclipses occur. Only two (or occasionally three) eclipse seasons occur each year, and each season lasts about 35 days and repeats just short of six months (173 days) later; thus two full eclipse seasons always occur each year. Either two or three eclipses happen each eclipse season. In the sequence below, each eclipse is separated by a fortnight.

Eclipse season of June–July 1945
June 25 Descending node (full moon)	July 9 Ascending node (new moon)
Partial lunar eclipse Lunar Saros 119	Total solar eclipse Solar Saros 145

== Related eclipses ==
=== Eclipses in 1945 ===
- An annular solar eclipse on January 14.
- A partial lunar eclipse on June 25.
- A total solar eclipse on July 9.
- A total lunar eclipse on December 19.

=== Metonic ===
- Preceded by: Lunar eclipse of September 5, 1941
- Followed by: Lunar eclipse of April 13, 1949

=== Tzolkinex ===
- Preceded by: Lunar eclipse of May 14, 1938
- Followed by: Lunar eclipse of August 5, 1952

=== Half-Saros ===
- Preceded by: Solar eclipse of June 19, 1936
- Followed by: Solar eclipse of June 30, 1954

=== Tritos ===
- Preceded by: Lunar eclipse of July 26, 1934
- Followed by: Lunar eclipse of May 24, 1956

=== Lunar Saros 119 ===
- Preceded by: Lunar eclipse of June 15, 1927
- Followed by: Lunar eclipse of July 6, 1963

=== Inex ===
- Preceded by: Lunar eclipse of July 15, 1916
- Followed by: Lunar eclipse of June 4, 1974

=== Triad ===
- Preceded by: Lunar eclipse of August 24, 1858
- Followed by: Lunar eclipse of April 25, 2032

=== Lunar eclipses of 1944–1947 ===
This eclipse is a member of a semester series. An eclipse in a semester series of lunar eclipses repeats approximately every 177 days and 4 hours (a semester) at alternating nodes of the Moon's orbit.

The penumbral lunar eclipses on February 9, 1944 and August 4, 1944 occur in the previous lunar year eclipse set.

Lunar eclipse series sets from 1944 to 1947
Descending node				Ascending node			
Saros	Date Viewing	Type Chart	Gamma	Saros	Date Viewing	Type Chart	Gamma
109	1944 Jul 06	Penumbral	1.2597	114	1944 Dec 29	Penumbral	−1.0115
119	1945 Jun 25	Partial	0.5370	124	1945 Dec 19	Total	−0.2845
129	1946 Jun 14	Total	−0.2324	134	1946 Dec 08	Total	0.3864
139	1947 Jun 03	Partial	−0.9850	144	1947 Nov 28	Penumbral	1.0838

=== Saros 119 ===
This eclipse is a part of Saros series 119, repeating every 18 years, 11 days, and containing 82 events. The series started with a penumbral lunar eclipse on October 14, 935 AD. It contains partial eclipses from May 18, 1296 through August 2, 1422; total eclipses from August 13, 1440 through June 15, 1927; and a second set of partial eclipses from June 25, 1945 through August 19, 2035. The series ends at member 82 as a penumbral eclipse on March 25, 2396.

The longest duration of totality was produced by member 49 at 102 minutes, 6 seconds on March 30, 1801. All eclipses in this series occur at the Moon’s descending node of orbit.

Greatest	First			
The greatest eclipse of the series occurred on 1801 Mar 30, lasting 102 minutes, 6 seconds.	Penumbral	Partial	Total	Central
The greatest eclipse of the series occurred on 1801 Mar 30, lasting 102 minutes, 6 seconds.	934 Oct 14	1296 May 18	1440 Aug 13	1512 Sep 25
The greatest eclipse of the series occurred on 1801 Mar 30, lasting 102 minutes, 6 seconds.	Last			
The greatest eclipse of the series occurred on 1801 Mar 30, lasting 102 minutes, 6 seconds.	Central	Total	Partial	Penumbral
The greatest eclipse of the series occurred on 1801 Mar 30, lasting 102 minutes, 6 seconds.	1873 May 12	1927 Jun 15	2035 Aug 19	2396 Mar 25

Eclipses are tabulated in three columns; every third eclipse in the same column is one exeligmos apart, so they all cast shadows over approximately the same parts of the Earth.

Series members 49–71 occur between 1801 and 2200:
49	50	51
1801 Mar 30	1819 Apr 10	1837 Apr 20
52	53	54
1855 May 02	1873 May 12	1891 May 23
55	56	57
1909 Jun 04	1927 Jun 15	1945 Jun 25
58	59	60
1963 Jul 06	1981 Jul 17	1999 Jul 28
61	62	63
2017 Aug 07	2035 Aug 19	2053 Aug 29
64	65	66
2071 Sep 09	2089 Sep 19	2107 Oct 02
67	68	69
2125 Oct 12	2143 Oct 23	2161 Nov 03
70	71	
2179 Nov 14	2197 Nov 24	

=== Tritos series ===
This eclipse is a part of a tritos cycle, repeating at alternating nodes every 135 synodic months (≈ 3986.63 days, or 11 years minus 1 month). Their appearance and longitude are irregular due to a lack of synchronization with the anomalistic month (period of perigee), but groupings of 3 tritos cycles (≈ 33 years minus 3 months) come close (≈ 434.044 anomalistic months), so eclipses are similar in these groupings.

Series members between 1801 and 2200
1803 Aug 03 (Saros 106)	1814 Jul 02 (Saros 107)	1825 Jun 01 (Saros 108)	1836 May 01 (Saros 109)	1847 Mar 31 (Saros 110)
1858 Feb 27 (Saros 111)	1869 Jan 28 (Saros 112)	1879 Dec 28 (Saros 113)	1890 Nov 26 (Saros 114)	1901 Oct 27 (Saros 115)
1912 Sep 26 (Saros 116)	1923 Aug 26 (Saros 117)	1934 Jul 26 (Saros 118)	1945 Jun 25 (Saros 119)	1956 May 24 (Saros 120)
1967 Apr 24 (Saros 121)	1978 Mar 24 (Saros 122)	1989 Feb 20 (Saros 123)	2000 Jan 21 (Saros 124)	2010 Dec 21 (Saros 125)
2021 Nov 19 (Saros 126)	2032 Oct 18 (Saros 127)	2043 Sep 19 (Saros 128)	2054 Aug 18 (Saros 129)	2065 Jul 17 (Saros 130)
2076 Jun 17 (Saros 131)	2087 May 17 (Saros 132)	2098 Apr 15 (Saros 133)	2109 Mar 17 (Saros 134)	2120 Feb 14 (Saros 135)
2131 Jan 13 (Saros 136)	2141 Dec 13 (Saros 137)	2152 Nov 12 (Saros 138)	2163 Oct 12 (Saros 139)	2174 Sep 11 (Saros 140)
2185 Aug 11 (Saros 141)	2196 Jul 10 (Saros 142)			

=== Inex series ===
This eclipse is a part of the long period inex cycle, repeating at alternating nodes, every 358 synodic months (≈ 10,571.95 days, or 29 years minus 20 days). Their appearance and longitude are irregular due to a lack of synchronization with the anomalistic month (period of perigee). However, groupings of 3 inex cycles (≈ 87 years minus 2 months) comes close (≈ 1,151.02 anomalistic months), so eclipses are similar in these groupings.

Series members between 1801 and 2200
1829 Sep 13 (Saros 115)	1858 Aug 24 (Saros 116)	1887 Aug 03 (Saros 117)
1916 Jul 15 (Saros 118)	1945 Jun 25 (Saros 119)	1974 Jun 04 (Saros 120)
2003 May 16 (Saros 121)	2032 Apr 25 (Saros 122)	2061 Apr 04 (Saros 123)
2090 Mar 15 (Saros 124)	2119 Feb 25 (Saros 125)	2148 Feb 04 (Saros 126)
2177 Jan 14 (Saros 127)

=== Half-Saros cycle ===
A lunar eclipse will be preceded and followed by solar eclipses by 9 years and 5.5 days (a half saros). This lunar eclipse is related to two total solar eclipses of Solar Saros 126.

June 19, 1936	June 30, 1954

== See also ==
- List of lunar eclipses
- List of 20th-century lunar eclipses
