= August 2017 lunar eclipse =

Partial lunar eclipse of August 7, 2017

- Partial eclipse
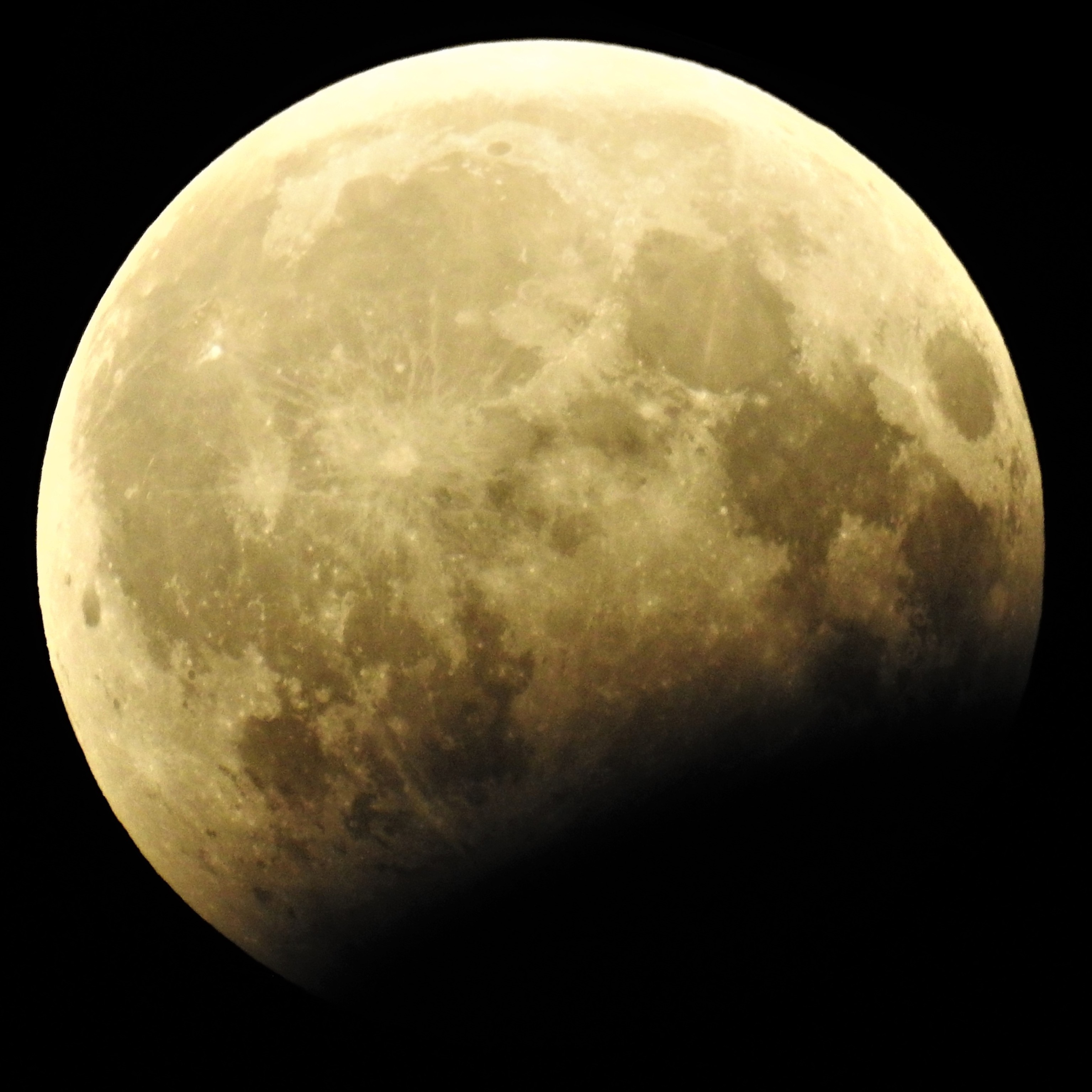
- Partiality as viewed from Kuwait City, Kuwait, 19:14 UTC
- Date: August 7, 2017
- Gamma: 0.8668
- Magnitude: 0.2477
- Saros cycle: 119 (62 of 83)
- Partiality: 115 minutes, 15 seconds
- Penumbral: 300 minutes, 54 seconds
Contacts (UTC)
- P1: 15:50:02
- U1: 17:22:55
- Greatest: 18:20:28
- U4: 19:18:10
- P4: 20:50:56

A partial lunar eclipse occurred at the Moon’s descending node of orbit on Monday, August 7, 2017, with an umbral magnitude of 0.2477. A lunar eclipse occurs when the Moon moves into the Earth's shadow, causing the Moon to be darkened. A partial lunar eclipse occurs when one part of the Moon is in the Earth's umbra, while the other part is in the Earth's penumbra. Unlike a solar eclipse, which can only be viewed from a relatively small area of the world, a lunar eclipse may be viewed from anywhere on the night side of Earth. Occurring about 5.2 days after apogee (on August 2, 2017, at 13:55 UTC), the Moon's apparent diameter was smaller.

== Visibility ==
The eclipse was completely visible over east Africa, Asia, and Australia, seen rising over much of Africa and Europe and setting over the central Pacific Ocean.

Hourly motion shown right to left
Visibility map

== Gallery ==
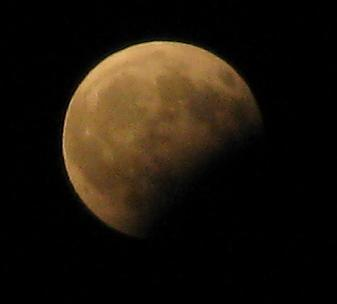
Reggio Calabria, Italy, 17:36 UTC

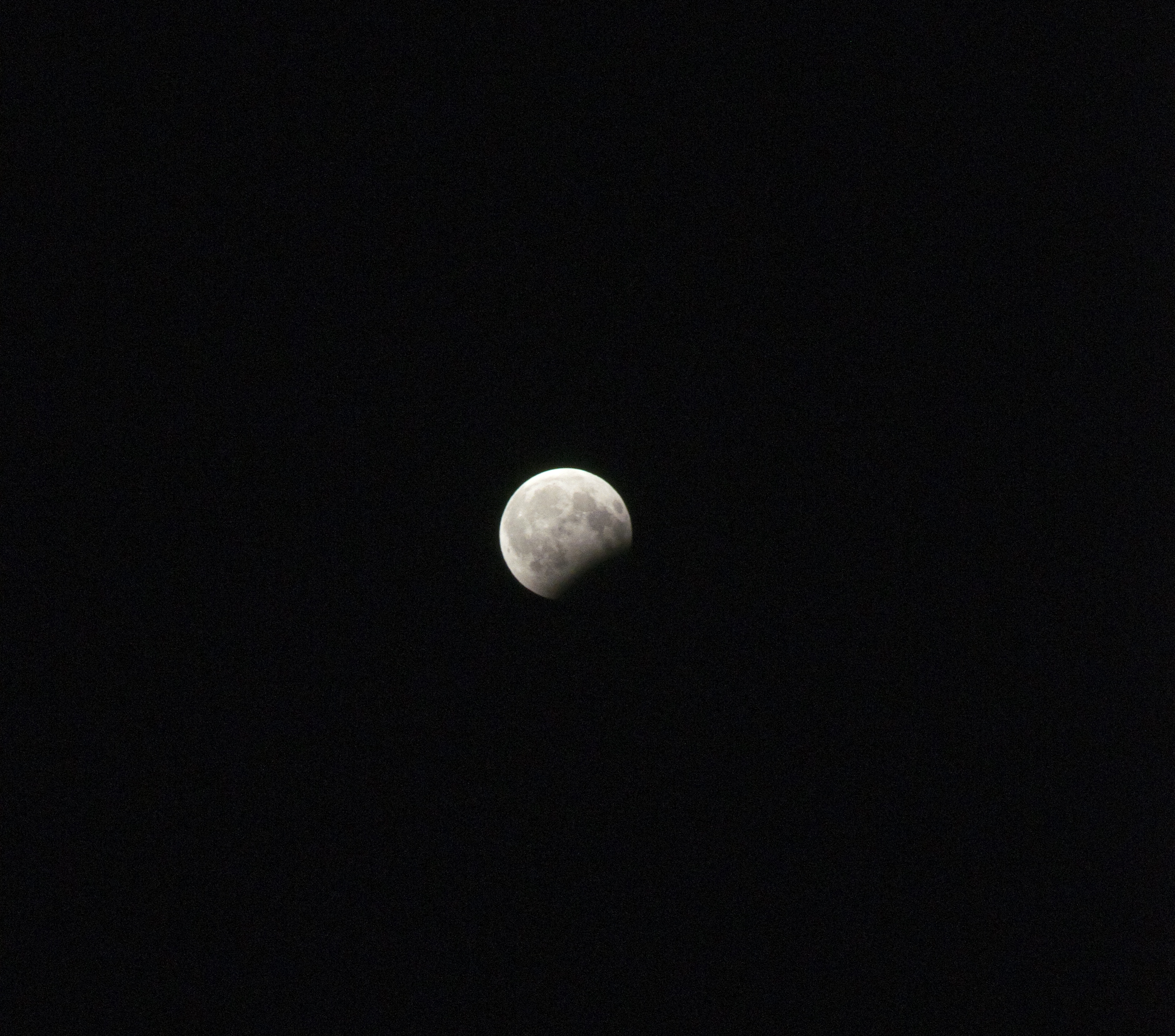
Lysychansk, Ukraine, 17:54 UTC

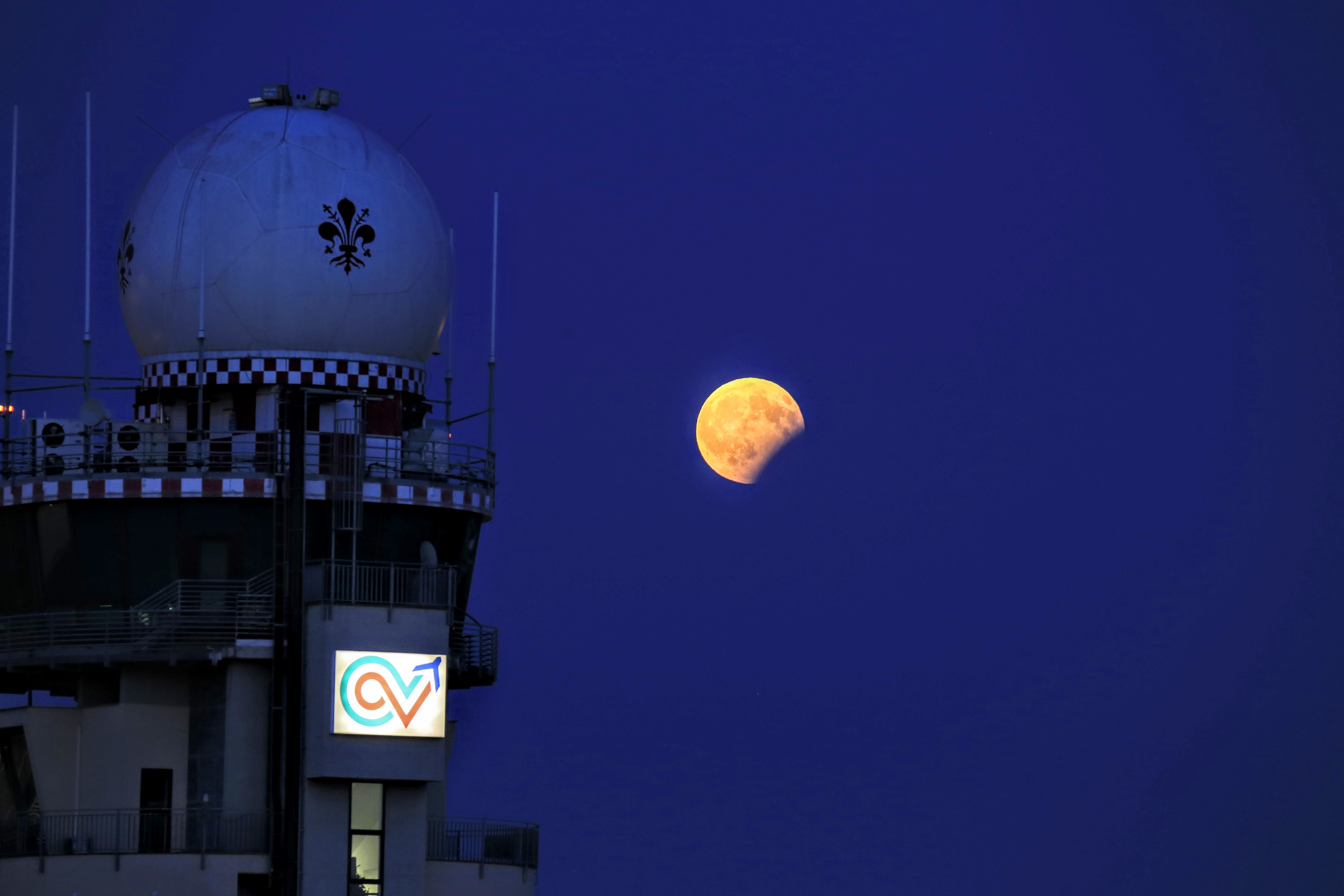
Florence, Italy, 17:55 UTC

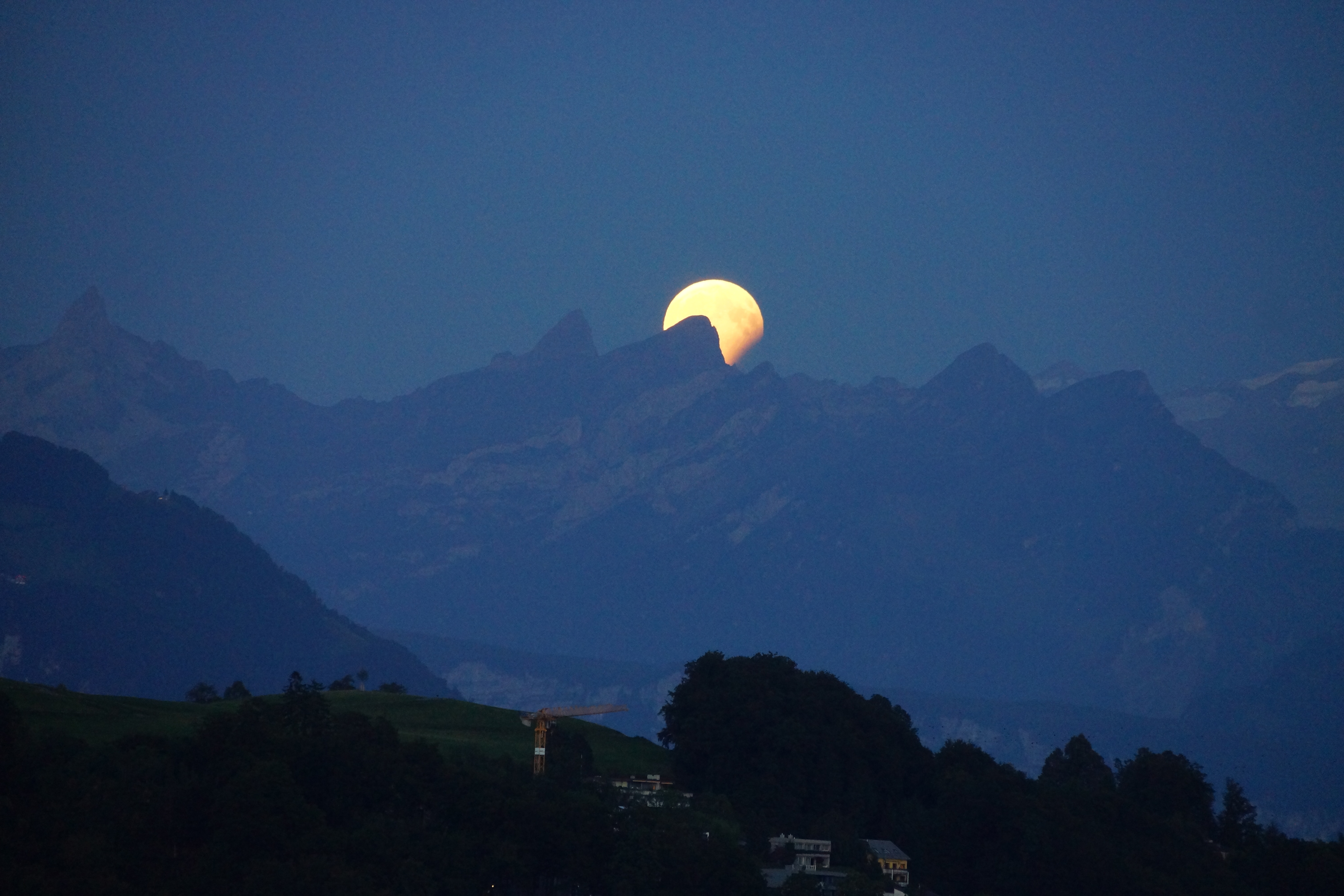
Lucerne, Switzerland, 18:16 UTC

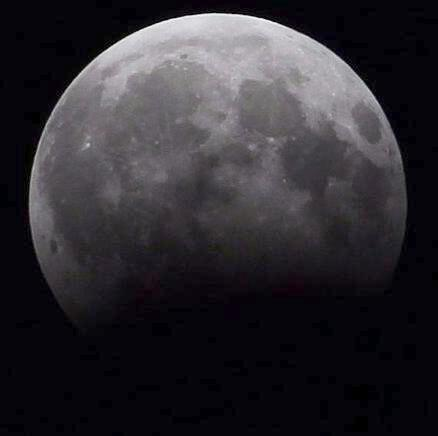
Pune, India
At maximum, 18:20 UTC

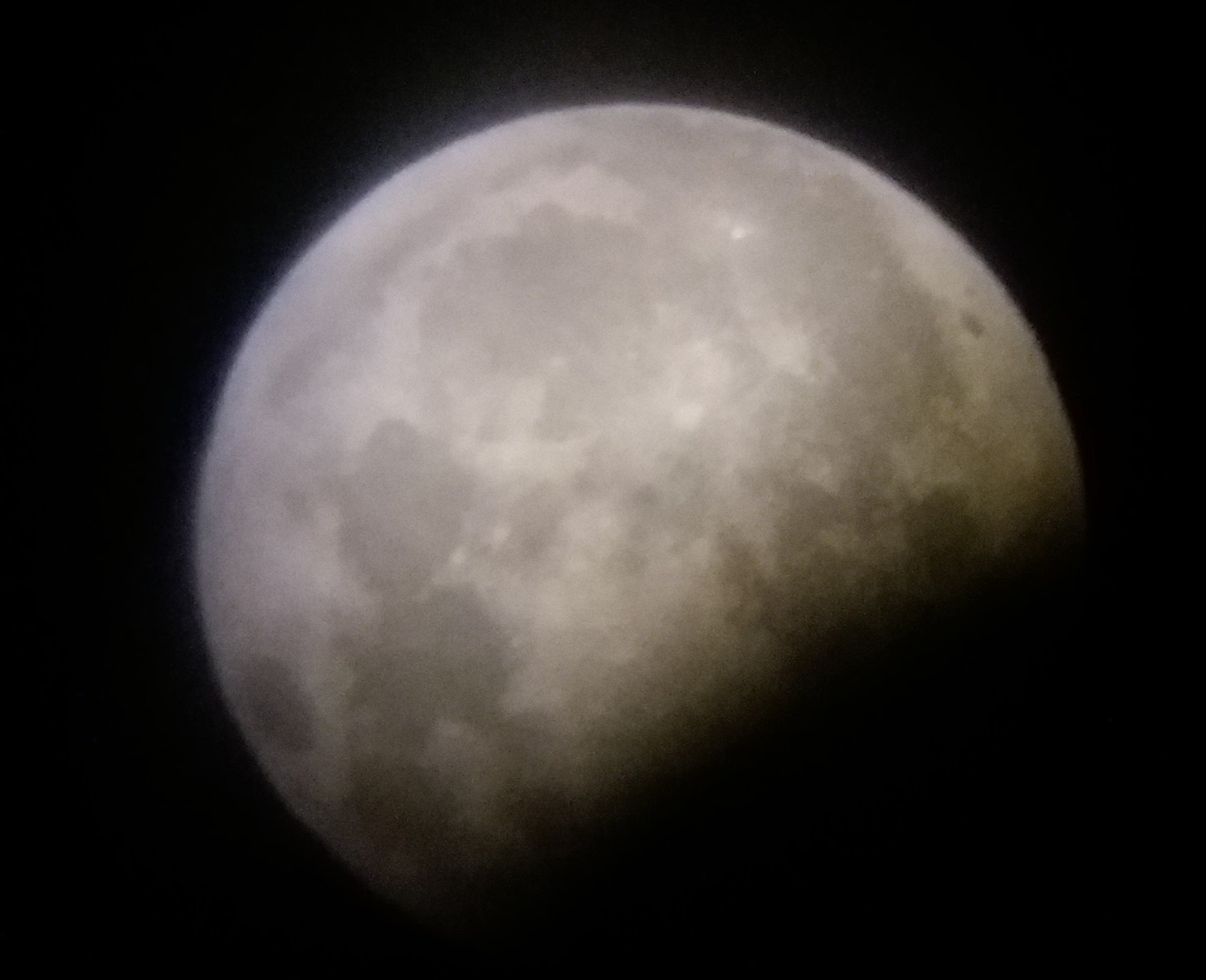
Seoul, South Korea, 18:22 UTC

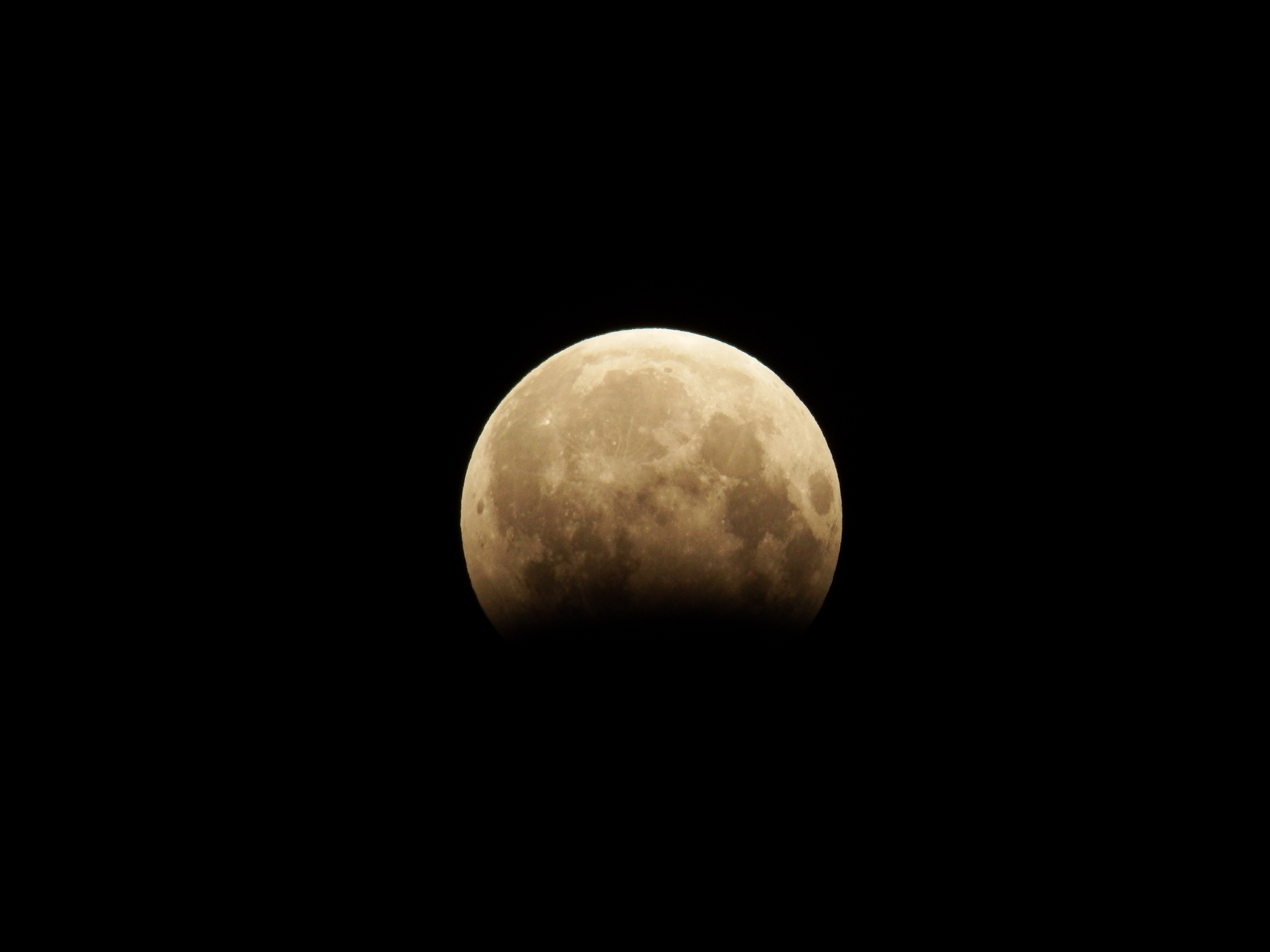
Omsk, Russia, 18:28 UTC

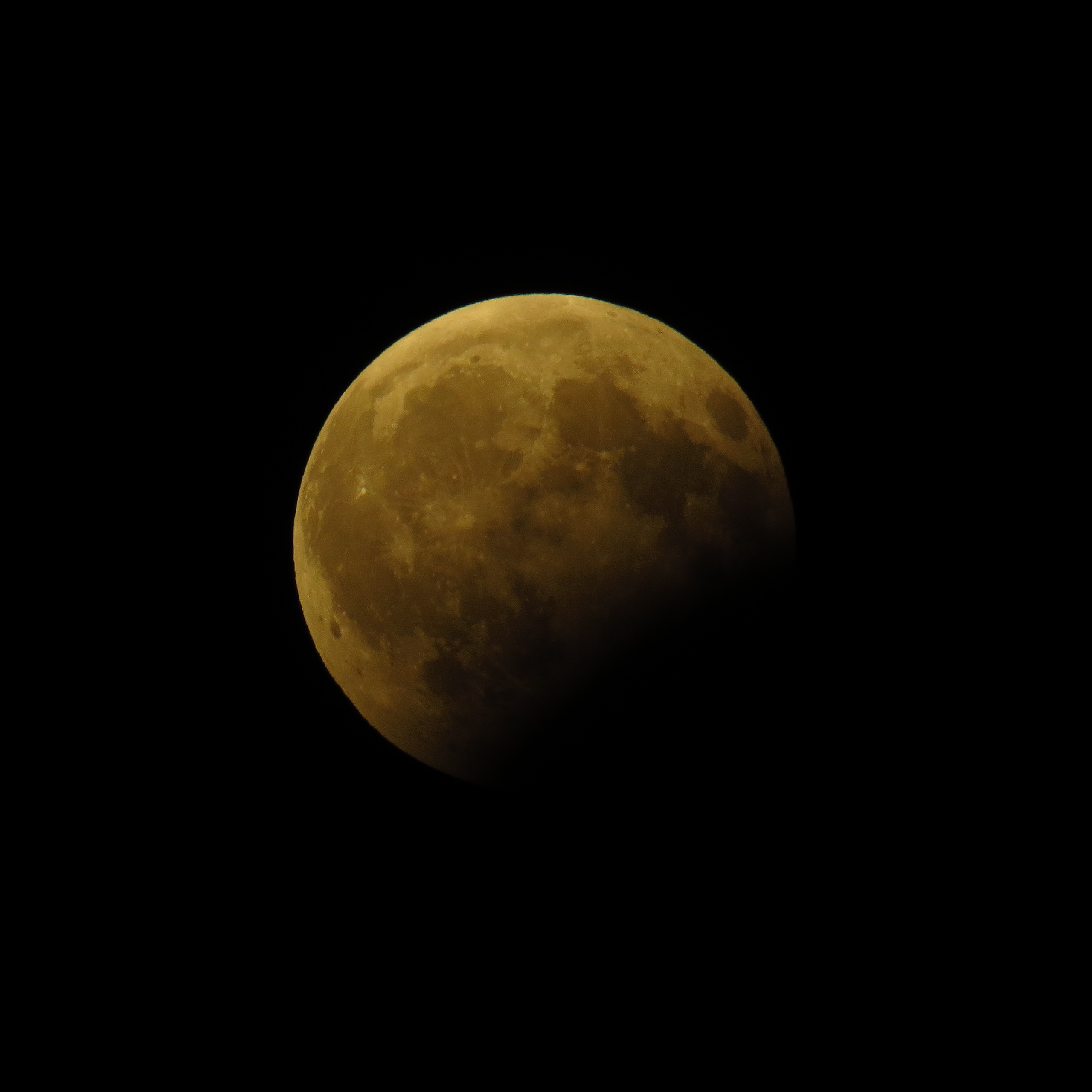
Constanța, Romania, 18:43 UTC

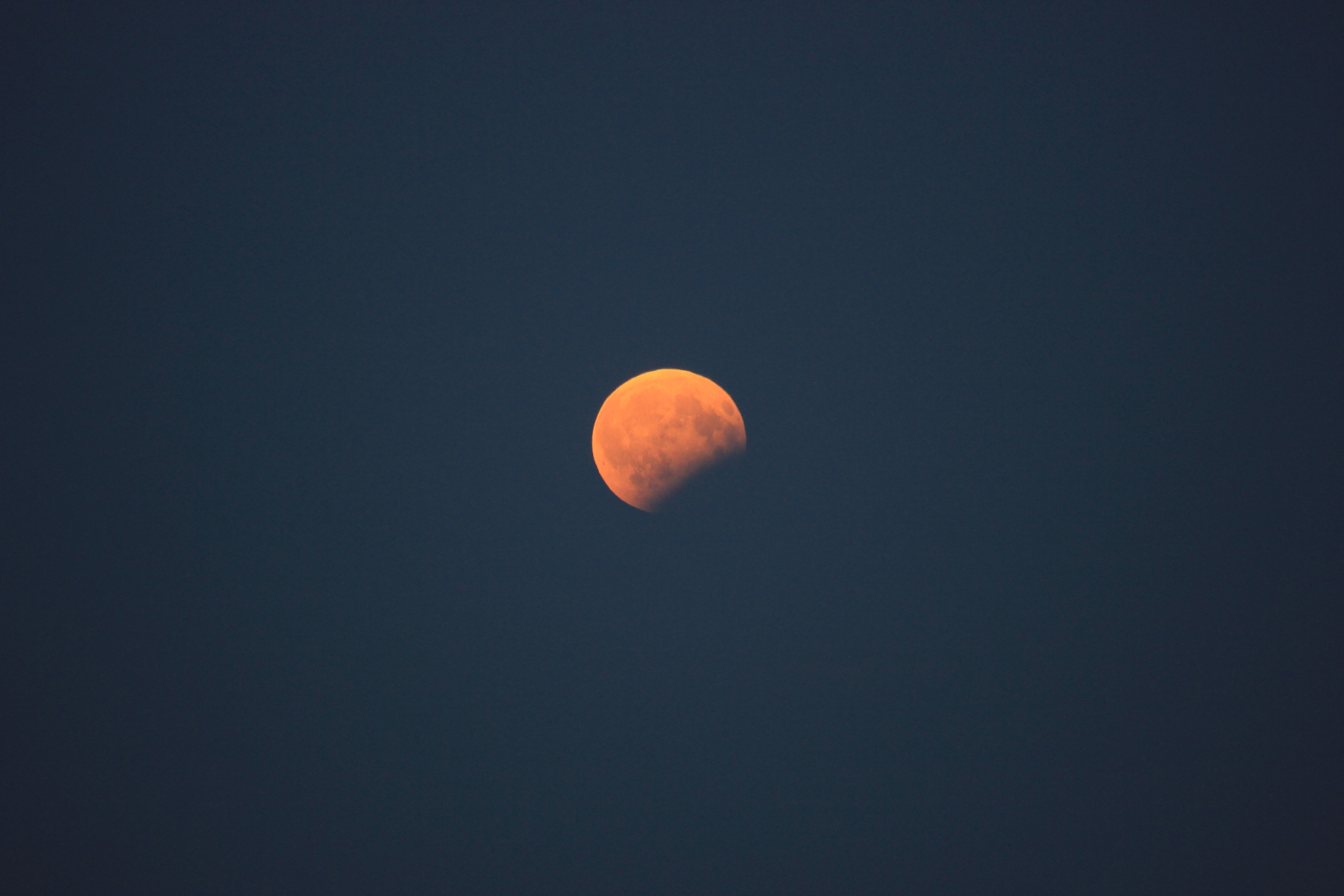
Gdańsk, Poland, 18:50 UTC

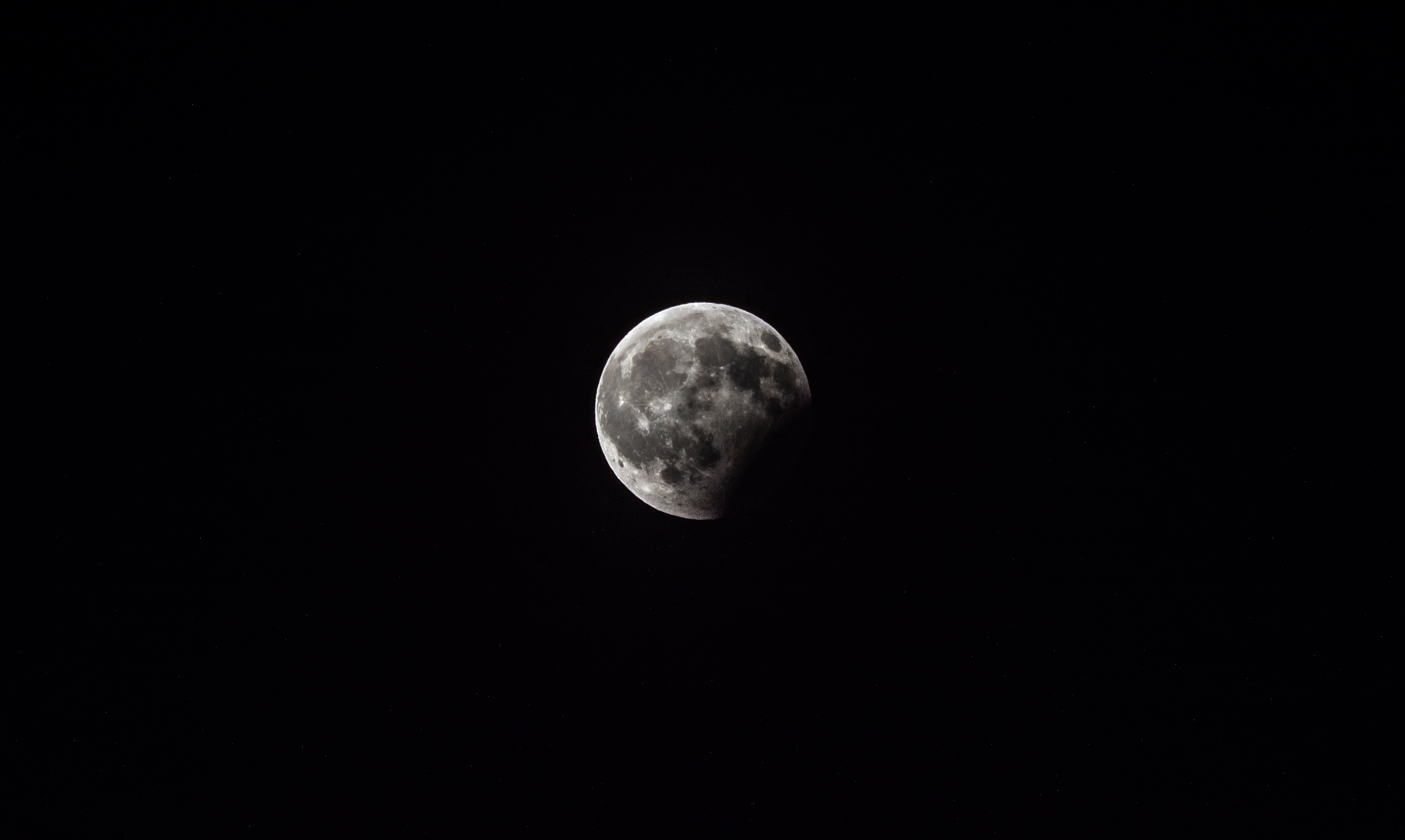
Farasan Island, Saudi Arabia, 18:53 UTC

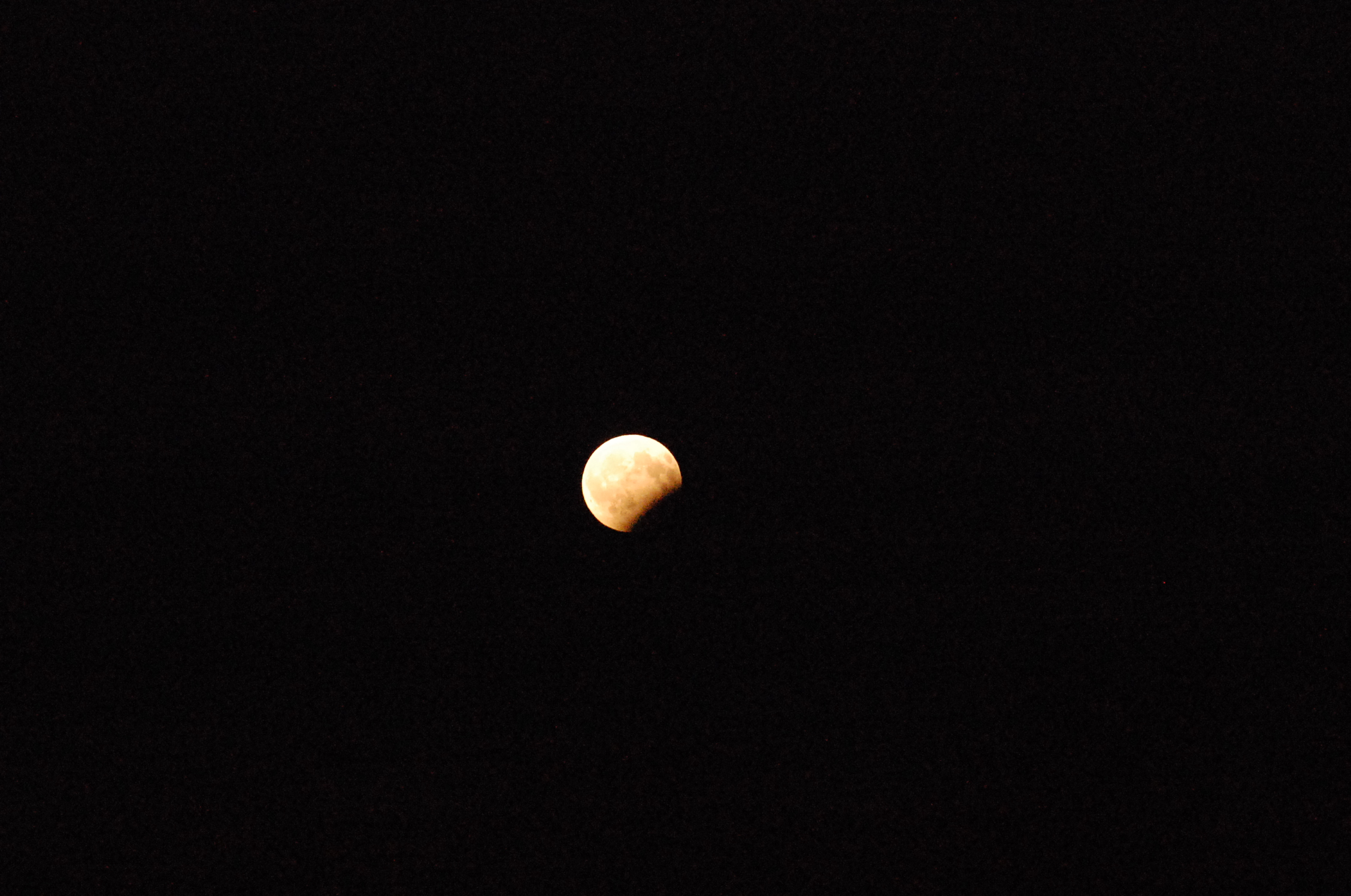
Karviná, Czech Republic, 18:56 UTC

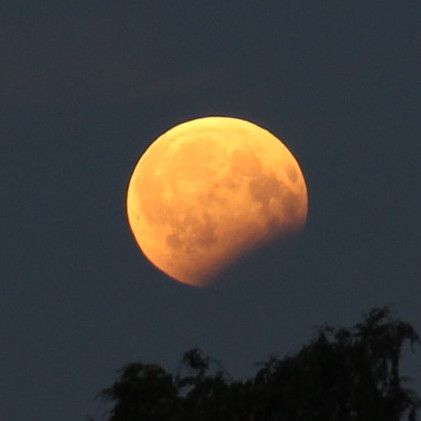
Helsinki, Finland, 18:57 UTC

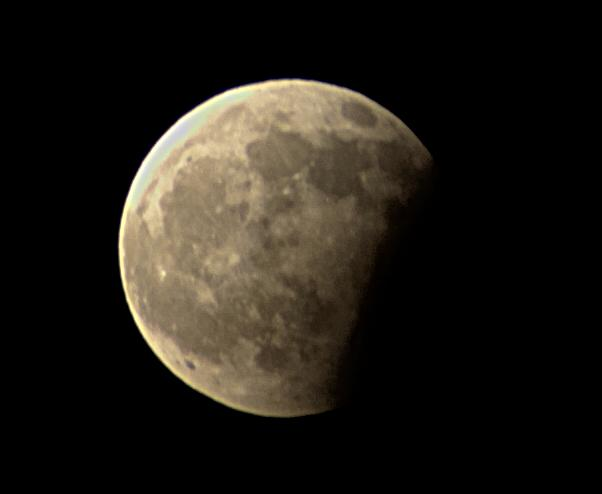
Sayada, Tunisia, 19:01 UTC

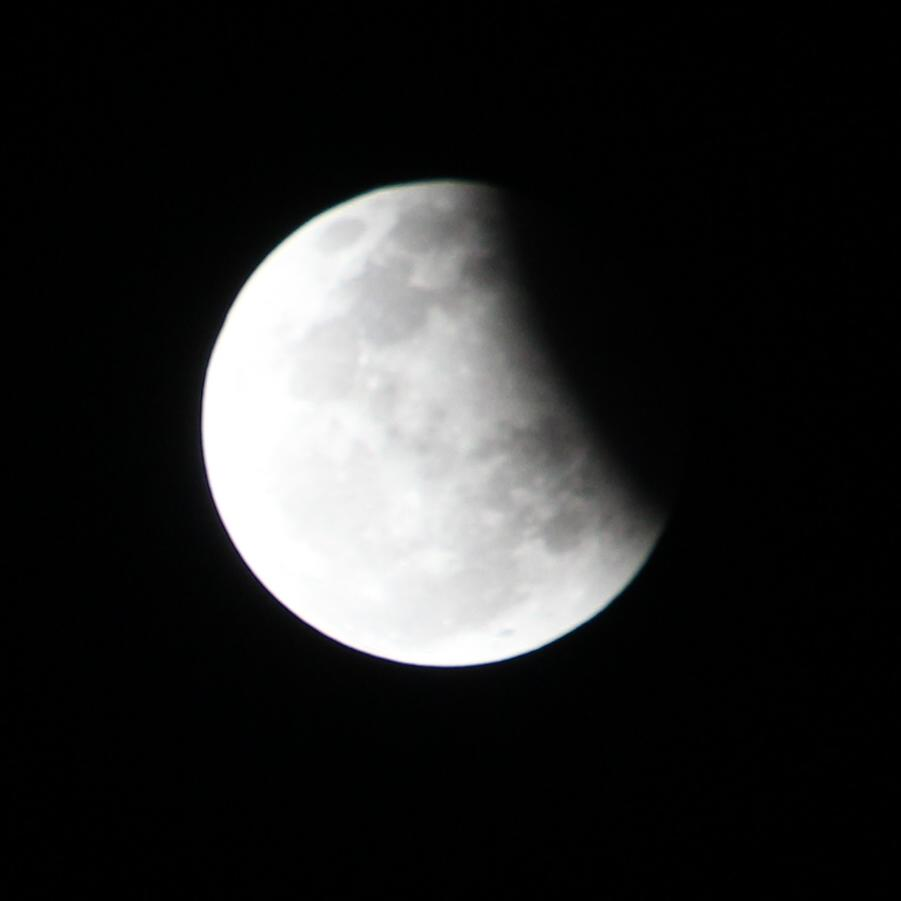
Gaborone, Botswana, 19:02 UTC

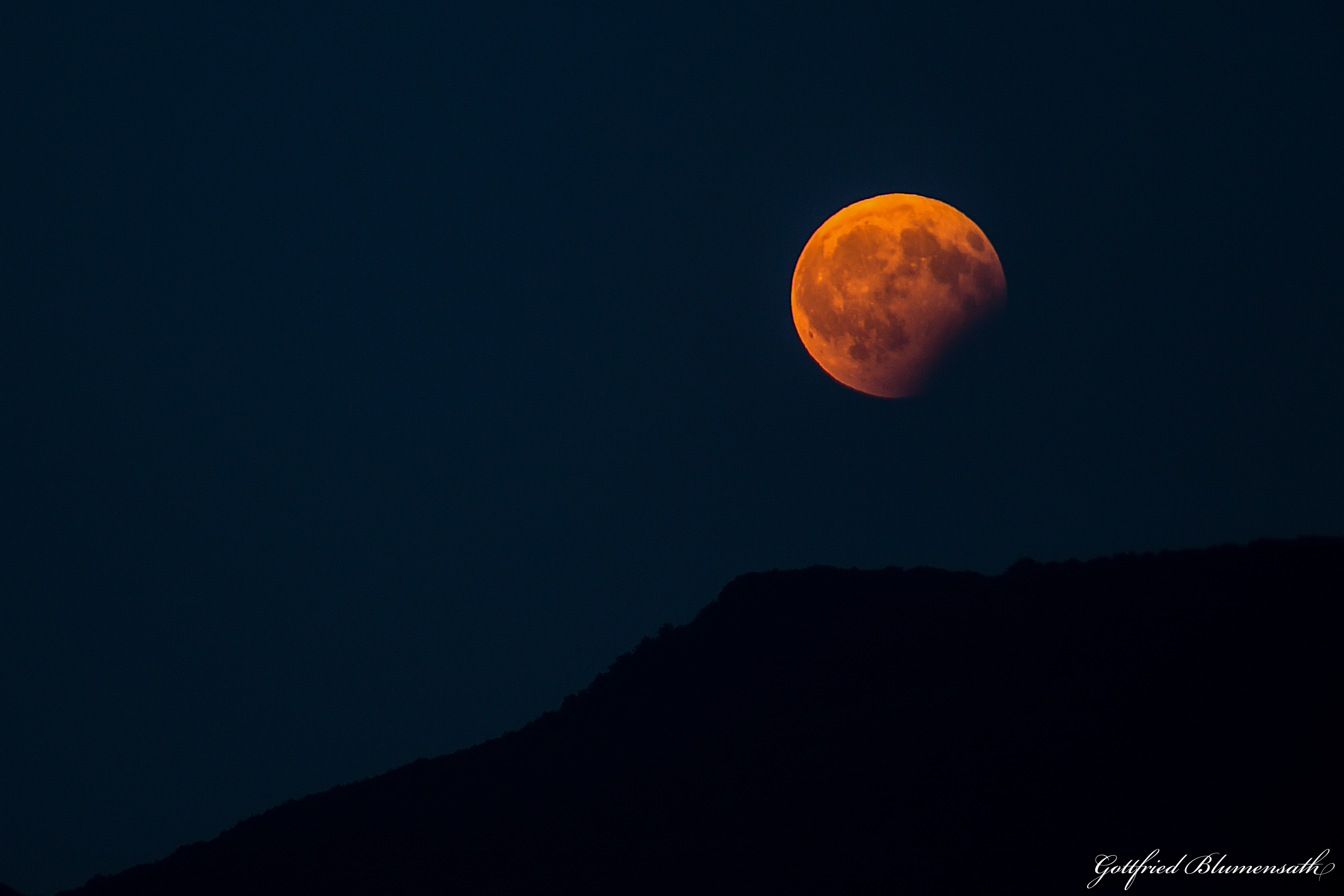
Albershausen, Germany, 19:14 UTC

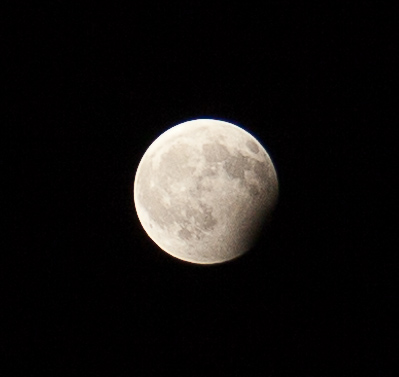
Rethymno, Greece, 19:21 UTC

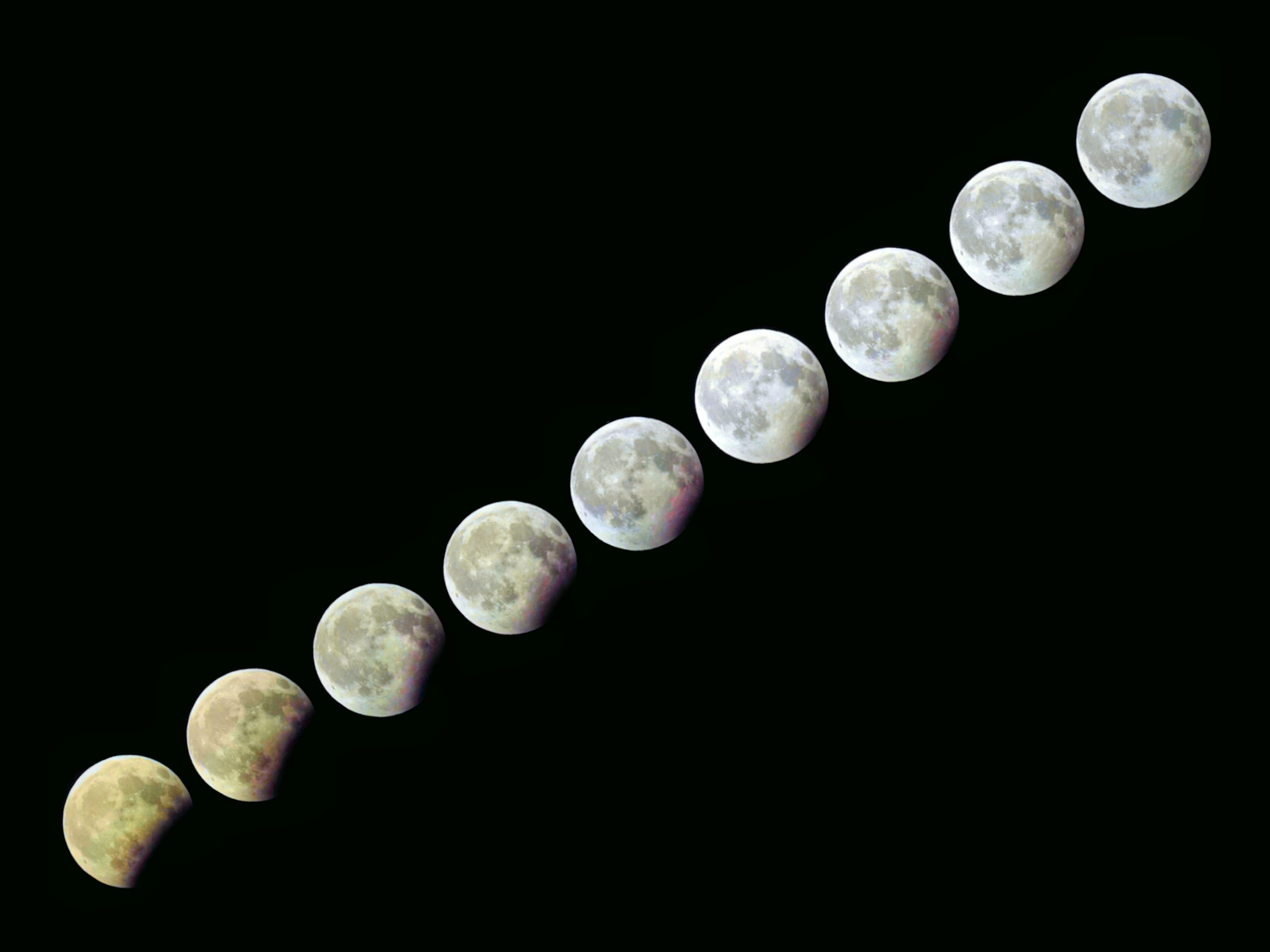
Progression from Oria, Italy

== Eclipse details ==
Shown below is a table displaying details about this particular lunar eclipse. It describes various parameters pertaining to this eclipse.

August 7, 2017 Lunar Eclipse Parameters
Parameter	Value
Penumbral Magnitude	1.28985
Umbral Magnitude	0.24767
Gamma	0.86690
Sun Right Ascension	09h11m33.0s
Sun Declination	+16°12'28.1"
Sun Semi-Diameter	15'46.4"
Sun Equatorial Horizontal Parallax	08.7"
Moon Right Ascension	21h10m53.1s
Moon Declination	-15°25'17.2"
Moon Semi-Diameter	15'08.1"
Moon Equatorial Horizontal Parallax	0°55'32.7"
ΔT	68.5 s

== Eclipse season ==
This eclipse is part of an eclipse season, a period, roughly every six months, when eclipses occur. Only two (or occasionally three) eclipse seasons occur each year, and each season lasts about 35 days and repeats just short of six months (173 days) later; thus two full eclipse seasons always occur each year. Either two or three eclipses happen each eclipse season. In the sequence below, each eclipse is separated by a fortnight.

Eclipse season of August 2017
August 7 Descending node (full moon)	August 21 Ascending node (new moon)
Partial lunar eclipse Lunar Saros 119	Total solar eclipse Solar Saros 145

== Related eclipses ==
=== Eclipses in 2017 ===
- A penumbral lunar eclipse on February 11.
- An annular solar eclipse on February 26.
- A partial lunar eclipse on August 7.
- A total solar eclipse on August 21.

=== Metonic ===
- Preceded by: Lunar eclipse of October 18, 2013
- Followed by: Lunar eclipse of May 26, 2021

=== Tzolkinex ===
- Preceded by: Lunar eclipse of June 26, 2010
- Followed by: Lunar eclipse of September 18, 2024

=== Half-Saros ===
- Preceded by: Solar eclipse of August 1, 2008
- Followed by: Solar eclipse of August 12, 2026

=== Tritos ===
- Preceded by: Lunar eclipse of September 7, 2006
- Followed by: Lunar eclipse of July 6, 2028

=== Lunar Saros 119 ===
- Preceded by: Lunar eclipse of July 28, 1999
- Followed by: Lunar eclipse of August 19, 2035

=== Inex ===
- Preceded by: Lunar eclipse of August 27, 1988
- Followed by: Lunar eclipse of July 18, 2046

=== Triad ===
- Preceded by: Lunar eclipse of October 7, 1930
- Followed by: Lunar eclipse of June 8, 2104

=== Lunar eclipses of 2016–2020 ===
This eclipse is a member of a semester series. An eclipse in a semester series of lunar eclipses repeats approximately every 177 days and 4 hours (a semester) at alternating nodes of the Moon's orbit.

The penumbral lunar eclipses on March 23, 2016 and September 16, 2016 occur in the previous lunar year eclipse set, and the penumbral lunar eclipses on June 5, 2020 and November 30, 2020 occur in the next lunar year eclipse set.

Lunar eclipse series sets from 2016 to 2020
Descending node				Ascending node			
Saros	Date Viewing	Type Chart	Gamma	Saros	Date Viewing	Type Chart	Gamma
109	2016 Aug 18	Penumbral	1.5641	114	2017 Feb 11	Penumbral	−1.0255
119	2017 Aug 07	Partial	0.8669	124	2018 Jan 31	Total	−0.3014
129	2018 Jul 27	Total	0.1168	134	2019 Jan 21	Total	0.3684
139	2019 Jul 16	Partial	−0.6430	144	2020 Jan 10	Penumbral	1.0727
149	2020 Jul 05	Penumbral	−1.3639				

=== Saros 119 ===
This eclipse is a part of Saros series 119, repeating every 18 years, 11 days, and containing 82 events. The series started with a penumbral lunar eclipse on October 14, 935 AD. It contains partial eclipses from May 18, 1296 through August 2, 1422; total eclipses from August 13, 1440 through June 15, 1927; and a second set of partial eclipses from June 25, 1945 through August 19, 2035. The series ends at member 82 as a penumbral eclipse on March 25, 2396.

The longest duration of totality was produced by member 49 at 102 minutes, 6 seconds on March 30, 1801. All eclipses in this series occur at the Moon’s descending node of orbit.

Greatest	First			
The greatest eclipse of the series occurred on 1801 Mar 30, lasting 102 minutes, 6 seconds.	Penumbral	Partial	Total	Central
The greatest eclipse of the series occurred on 1801 Mar 30, lasting 102 minutes, 6 seconds.	934 Oct 14	1296 May 18	1440 Aug 13	1512 Sep 25
The greatest eclipse of the series occurred on 1801 Mar 30, lasting 102 minutes, 6 seconds.	Last			
The greatest eclipse of the series occurred on 1801 Mar 30, lasting 102 minutes, 6 seconds.	Central	Total	Partial	Penumbral
The greatest eclipse of the series occurred on 1801 Mar 30, lasting 102 minutes, 6 seconds.	1873 May 12	1927 Jun 15	2035 Aug 19	2396 Mar 25

Eclipses are tabulated in three columns; every third eclipse in the same column is one exeligmos apart, so they all cast shadows over approximately the same parts of the Earth.

Series members 49–71 occur between 1801 and 2200:
49	50	51
1801 Mar 30	1819 Apr 10	1837 Apr 20
52	53	54
1855 May 02	1873 May 12	1891 May 23
55	56	57
1909 Jun 04	1927 Jun 15	1945 Jun 25
58	59	60
1963 Jul 06	1981 Jul 17	1999 Jul 28
61	62	63
2017 Aug 07	2035 Aug 19	2053 Aug 29
64	65	66
2071 Sep 09	2089 Sep 19	2107 Oct 02
67	68	69
2125 Oct 12	2143 Oct 23	2161 Nov 03
70	71	
2179 Nov 14	2197 Nov 24	

=== Tritos series ===
This eclipse is a part of a tritos cycle, repeating at alternating nodes every 135 synodic months (≈ 3986.63 days, or 11 years minus 1 month). Their appearance and longitude are irregular due to a lack of synchronization with the anomalistic month (period of perigee), but groupings of 3 tritos cycles (≈ 33 years minus 3 months) come close (≈ 434.044 anomalistic months), so eclipses are similar in these groupings.

Series members between 1801 and 2200
1810 Mar 21 (Saros 100)	1821 Feb 17 (Saros 101)	1832 Jan 17 (Saros 102)	1842 Dec 17 (Saros 103)	
1864 Oct 15 (Saros 105)	1875 Sep 15 (Saros 106)	1886 Aug 14 (Saros 107)	1897 Jul 14 (Saros 108)	1908 Jun 14 (Saros 109)
1919 May 15 (Saros 110)	1930 Apr 13 (Saros 111)	1941 Mar 13 (Saros 112)	1952 Feb 11 (Saros 113)	1963 Jan 09 (Saros 114)
1973 Dec 10 (Saros 115)	1984 Nov 08 (Saros 116)	1995 Oct 08 (Saros 117)	2006 Sep 07 (Saros 118)	2017 Aug 07 (Saros 119)
2028 Jul 06 (Saros 120)	2039 Jun 06 (Saros 121)	2050 May 06 (Saros 122)	2061 Apr 04 (Saros 123)	2072 Mar 04 (Saros 124)
2083 Feb 02 (Saros 125)	2094 Jan 01 (Saros 126)	2104 Dec 02 (Saros 127)	2115 Nov 02 (Saros 128)	2126 Oct 01 (Saros 129)
2137 Aug 30 (Saros 130)	2148 Jul 31 (Saros 131)	2159 Jun 30 (Saros 132)	2170 May 30 (Saros 133)	2181 Apr 29 (Saros 134)
2192 Mar 28 (Saros 135)

=== Inex series ===
This eclipse is a part of the long period inex cycle, repeating at alternating nodes, every 358 synodic months (≈ 10,571.95 days, or 29 years minus 20 days). Their appearance and longitude are irregular due to a lack of synchronization with the anomalistic month (period of perigee). However, groupings of 3 inex cycles (≈ 87 years minus 2 months) comes close (≈ 1,151.02 anomalistic months), so eclipses are similar in these groupings.

Series members between 1801 and 2200
1814 Dec 26 (Saros 112)	1843 Dec 07 (Saros 113)	1872 Nov 15 (Saros 114)
1901 Oct 27 (Saros 115)	1930 Oct 07 (Saros 116)	1959 Sep 17 (Saros 117)
1988 Aug 27 (Saros 118)	2017 Aug 07 (Saros 119)	2046 Jul 18 (Saros 120)
2075 Jun 28 (Saros 121)	2104 Jun 08 (Saros 122)	2133 May 19 (Saros 123)
2162 Apr 29 (Saros 124)	2191 Apr 09 (Saros 125)	

=== Half-Saros cycle ===
A lunar eclipse will be preceded and followed by solar eclipses by 9 years and 5.5 days (a half saros). This lunar eclipse is related to two total solar eclipses of Solar Saros 126.

August 1, 2008	August 12, 2026

== See also ==
- List of 21st-century lunar eclipses
- Lists of lunar eclipses
