= August 2035 lunar eclipse =

Astronomical event

- Partial eclipse
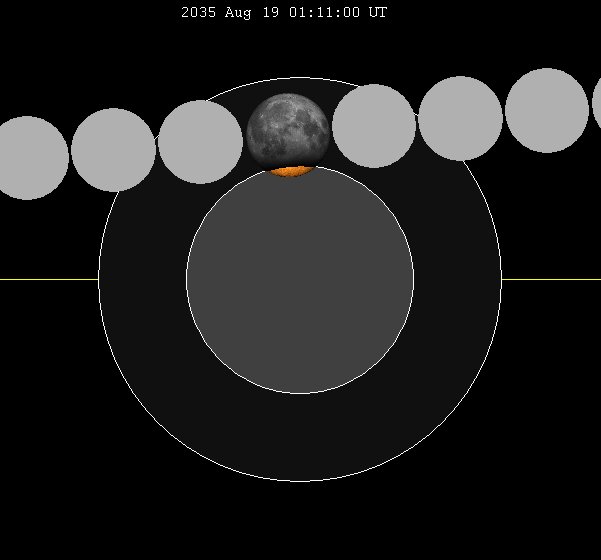
- The Moon's hourly motion shown right to left
- Date: August 19, 2035
- Gamma: 0.9433
- Magnitude: 0.1049
- Saros cycle: 119 (63 of 83)
- Partiality: 76 minutes, 31 seconds
- Penumbral: 289 minutes, 51 seconds
Contacts (UTC)
- P1: 22:47:21
- U1: 0:34:00
- Greatest: 1:12:15
- U4: 1:50:30
- P4: 3:37:09

A partial lunar eclipse will occur at the Moon’s descending node of orbit on Sunday, August 19, 2035, with an umbral magnitude of 0.1049. A lunar eclipse occurs when the Moon moves into the Earth's shadow, causing the Moon to be darkened. A partial lunar eclipse occurs when one part of the Moon is in the Earth's umbra, while the other part is in the Earth's penumbra. Unlike a solar eclipse, which can only be viewed from a relatively small area of the world, a lunar eclipse may be viewed from anywhere on the night side of Earth. Occurring about 4.9 days before apogee (on August 14, 2035, at 2:10 UTC), the Moon's apparent diameter will be smaller.

== Visibility ==
The eclipse will be completely visible over South America, Africa, and Europe, seen rising over North America and setting over west, central, and south Asia.

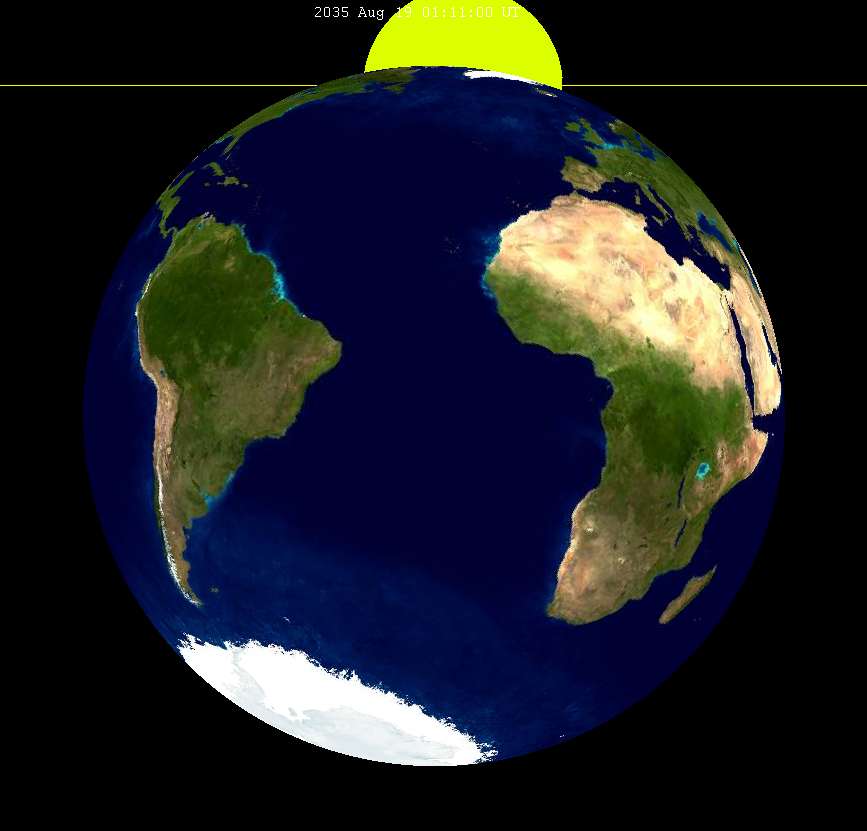
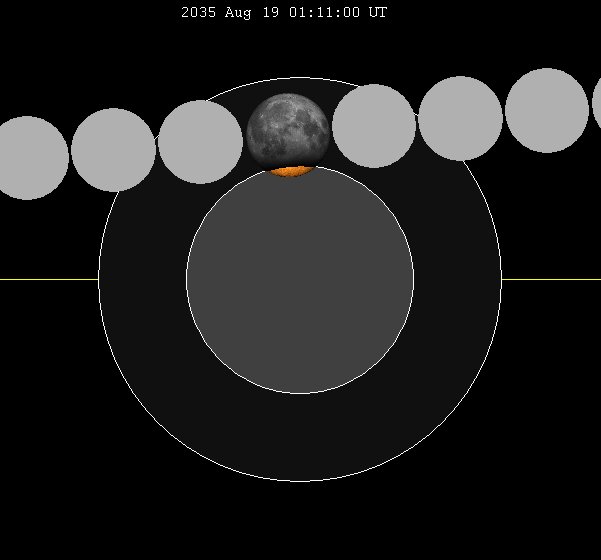

== Eclipse details ==
Shown below is a table displaying details about this particular solar eclipse. It describes various parameters pertaining to this eclipse.

August 19, 2035 Lunar Eclipse Parameters
Parameter	Value
Penumbral Magnitude	1.15186
Umbral Magnitude	0.10490
Gamma	0.94339
Sun Right Ascension	09h52m42.8s
Sun Declination	+12°52'21.3"
Sun Semi-Diameter	15'48.1"
Sun Equatorial Horizontal Parallax	08.7"
Moon Right Ascension	21h51m50.7s
Moon Declination	-12°01'40.6"
Moon Semi-Diameter	15'05.5"
Moon Equatorial Horizontal Parallax	0°55'23.4"
ΔT	76.7 s

== Eclipse season ==
This eclipse is part of an eclipse season, a period, roughly every six months, when eclipses occur. Only two (or occasionally three) eclipse seasons occur each year, and each season lasts about 35 days and repeats just short of six months (173 days) later; thus two full eclipse seasons always occur each year. Either two or three eclipses happen each eclipse season. In the sequence below, each eclipse is separated by a fortnight.

Eclipse season of August–September 2035
August 19 Descending node (full moon)	September 2 Ascending node (new moon)
Partial lunar eclipse Lunar Saros 119	Total solar eclipse Solar Saros 145

== Related eclipses ==
=== Eclipses in 2035 ===
- A penumbral lunar eclipse on February 22.
- An annular solar eclipse on March 9.
- A partial lunar eclipse on August 19.
- A total solar eclipse on September 2.

=== Metonic ===
- Preceded by: Lunar eclipse of October 30, 2031
- Followed by: Lunar eclipse of June 6, 2039

=== Tzolkinex ===
- Preceded by: Lunar eclipse of July 6, 2028
- Followed by: Lunar eclipse of September 29, 2042

=== Half-Saros ===
- Preceded by: Solar eclipse of August 12, 2026
- Followed by: Solar eclipse of August 23, 2044

=== Tritos ===
- Preceded by: Lunar eclipse of September 18, 2024
- Followed by: Lunar eclipse of July 18, 2046

=== Lunar Saros 119 ===
- Preceded by: Lunar eclipse of August 7, 2017
- Followed by: Lunar eclipse of August 29, 2053

=== Inex ===
- Preceded by: Lunar eclipse of September 7, 2006
- Followed by: Lunar eclipse of July 28, 2064

=== Triad ===
- Preceded by: Lunar eclipse of October 18, 1948
- Followed by: Lunar eclipse of June 20, 2122

=== Lunar eclipses of 2035–2038 ===
This eclipse is a member of a semester series. An eclipse in a semester series of lunar eclipses repeats approximately every 177 days and 4 hours (a semester) at alternating nodes of the Moon's orbit.

The penumbral lunar eclipses on June 17, 2038 and December 11, 2038 occur in the next lunar year eclipse set.

Lunar eclipse series sets from 2035 to 2038
Ascending node				Descending node			
Saros	Date Viewing	Type Chart	Gamma	Saros	Date Viewing	Type Chart	Gamma
114	2035 Feb 22	Penumbral	−1.0357	119	2035 Aug 19	Partial	0.9433
124	2036 Feb 11	Total	−0.3110	129	2036 Aug 07	Total	0.2004
134	2037 Jan 31	Total	0.3619	139	2037 Jul 27	Partial	−0.5582
144	2038 Jan 21	Penumbral	1.0710	149	2038 Jul 16	Penumbral	−1.2837

=== Saros 119 ===
This eclipse is a part of Saros series 119, repeating every 18 years, 11 days, and containing 82 events. The series started with a penumbral lunar eclipse on October 14, 935 AD. It contains partial eclipses from May 18, 1296 through August 2, 1422; total eclipses from August 13, 1440 through June 15, 1927; and a second set of partial eclipses from June 25, 1945 through August 19, 2035. The series ends at member 82 as a penumbral eclipse on March 25, 2396.

The longest duration of totality was produced by member 49 at 102 minutes, 6 seconds on March 30, 1801. All eclipses in this series occur at the Moon’s descending node of orbit.

Greatest	First			
The greatest eclipse of the series occurred on 1801 Mar 30, lasting 102 minutes, 6 seconds.	Penumbral	Partial	Total	Central
The greatest eclipse of the series occurred on 1801 Mar 30, lasting 102 minutes, 6 seconds.	934 Oct 14	1296 May 18	1440 Aug 13	1512 Sep 25
The greatest eclipse of the series occurred on 1801 Mar 30, lasting 102 minutes, 6 seconds.	Last			
The greatest eclipse of the series occurred on 1801 Mar 30, lasting 102 minutes, 6 seconds.	Central	Total	Partial	Penumbral
The greatest eclipse of the series occurred on 1801 Mar 30, lasting 102 minutes, 6 seconds.	1873 May 12	1927 Jun 15	2035 Aug 19	2396 Mar 25

Eclipses are tabulated in three columns; every third eclipse in the same column is one exeligmos apart, so they all cast shadows over approximately the same parts of the Earth.

Series members 49–71 occur between 1801 and 2200:
49	50	51
1801 Mar 30	1819 Apr 10	1837 Apr 20
52	53	54
1855 May 02	1873 May 12	1891 May 23
55	56	57
1909 Jun 04	1927 Jun 15	1945 Jun 25
58	59	60
1963 Jul 06	1981 Jul 17	1999 Jul 28
61	62	63
2017 Aug 07	2035 Aug 19	2053 Aug 29
64	65	66
2071 Sep 09	2089 Sep 19	2107 Oct 02
67	68	69
2125 Oct 12	2143 Oct 23	2161 Nov 03
70	71	
2179 Nov 14	2197 Nov 24	

=== Tritos series ===
This eclipse is a part of a tritos cycle, repeating at alternating nodes every 135 synodic months (≈ 3986.63 days, or 11 years minus 1 month). Their appearance and longitude are irregular due to a lack of synchronization with the anomalistic month (period of perigee), but groupings of 3 tritos cycles (≈ 33 years minus 3 months) come close (≈ 434.044 anomalistic months), so eclipses are similar in these groupings.

Series members between 1817 and 2200
1817 May 01 (Saros 99)	1828 Mar 31 (Saros 100)	1839 Feb 28 (Saros 101)	1850 Jan 28 (Saros 102)	1860 Dec 28 (Saros 103)
		1893 Sep 25 (Saros 106)		1915 Jul 26 (Saros 108)
1926 Jun 25 (Saros 109)	1937 May 25 (Saros 110)	1948 Apr 23 (Saros 111)	1959 Mar 24 (Saros 112)	1970 Feb 21 (Saros 113)
1981 Jan 20 (Saros 114)	1991 Dec 21 (Saros 115)	2002 Nov 20 (Saros 116)	2013 Oct 18 (Saros 117)	2024 Sep 18 (Saros 118)
2035 Aug 19 (Saros 119)	2046 Jul 18 (Saros 120)	2057 Jun 17 (Saros 121)	2068 May 17 (Saros 122)	2079 Apr 16 (Saros 123)
2090 Mar 15 (Saros 124)	2101 Feb 14 (Saros 125)	2112 Jan 14 (Saros 126)	2122 Dec 13 (Saros 127)	2133 Nov 12 (Saros 128)
2144 Oct 11 (Saros 129)	2155 Sep 11 (Saros 130)	2166 Aug 11 (Saros 131)	2177 Jul 11 (Saros 132)	2188 Jun 09 (Saros 133)
2199 May 10 (Saros 134)

=== Inex series ===
This eclipse is a part of the long period inex cycle, repeating at alternating nodes, every 358 synodic months (≈ 10,571.95 days, or 29 years minus 20 days). Their appearance and longitude are irregular due to a lack of synchronization with the anomalistic month (period of perigee). However, groupings of 3 inex cycles (≈ 87 years minus 2 months) comes close (≈ 1,151.02 anomalistic months), so eclipses are similar in these groupings.

Series members between 1801 and 2200
1804 Jan 26 (Saros 111)	1833 Jan 06 (Saros 112)	1861 Dec 17 (Saros 113)
1890 Nov 26 (Saros 114)	1919 Nov 07 (Saros 115)	1948 Oct 18 (Saros 116)
1977 Sep 27 (Saros 117)	2006 Sep 07 (Saros 118)	2035 Aug 19 (Saros 119)
2064 Jul 28 (Saros 120)	2093 Jul 08 (Saros 121)	2122 Jun 20 (Saros 122)
2151 May 30 (Saros 123)	2180 May 09 (Saros 124)	

=== Half-Saros cycle ===
A lunar eclipse will be preceded and followed by solar eclipses by 9 years and 5.5 days (a half saros). This lunar eclipse is related to two total solar eclipses of Solar Saros 126.

August 12, 2026	August 23, 2044

== See also ==
- List of lunar eclipses and List of 21st-century lunar eclipses
