= August 2053 lunar eclipse =

Penumbral

- Penumbral eclipse
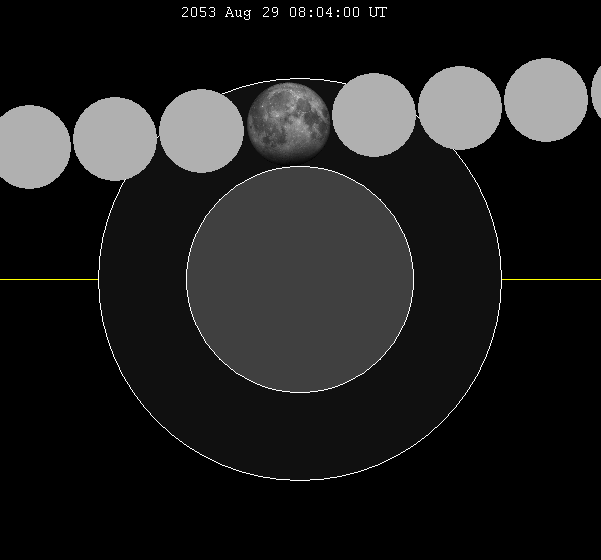
- The Moon's hourly motion shown right to left
- Date: August 29, 2053
- Gamma: 1.0165
- Magnitude: −0.0319
- Saros cycle: 119 (64 of 83)
- Penumbral: 277 minutes, 51 seconds
Contacts (UTC)
- P1: 5:45:29
- Greatest: 8:04:22
- P4: 10:23:20

A penumbral lunar eclipse will occur at the Moon’s descending node of orbit on Friday, August 29, 2053, with an umbral magnitude of −0.0319. It will be a relatively rare total penumbral lunar eclipse, with the Moon passing entirely within the penumbral shadow without entering the darker umbral shadow. A lunar eclipse occurs when the Moon moves into the Earth's shadow, causing the Moon to be darkened. A penumbral lunar eclipse occurs when part or all of the Moon's near side passes into the Earth's penumbra. Unlike a solar eclipse, which can only be viewed from a relatively small area of the world, a lunar eclipse may be viewed from anywhere on the night side of Earth. Occurring about 4.7 days after apogee (on August 24, 2053, at 14:30 UTC), the Moon's apparent diameter will be smaller.

== Visibility ==
The eclipse will be completely visible over much of North America and western South America, seen rising over northeast Asia and Australia and setting over eastern South America and west Africa.

== Eclipse details ==
Shown below is a table displaying details about this particular solar eclipse. It describes various parameters pertaining to this eclipse.

August 29, 2053 Lunar Eclipse Parameters
Parameter	Value
Penumbral Magnitude	1.02028
Umbral Magnitude	−0.03187
Gamma	1.01651
Sun Right Ascension	10h32m52.4s
Sun Declination	+09°08'07.1"
Sun Semi-Diameter	15'50.2"
Sun Equatorial Horizontal Parallax	08.7"
Moon Right Ascension	22h31m49.7s
Moon Declination	-08°14'09.0"
Moon Semi-Diameter	15'03.1"
Moon Equatorial Horizontal Parallax	0°55'14.5"
ΔT	87.5 s

== Eclipse season ==
This eclipse is part of an eclipse season, a period, roughly every six months, when eclipses occur. Only two (or occasionally three) eclipse seasons occur each year, and each season lasts about 35 days and repeats just short of six months (173 days) later; thus two full eclipse seasons always occur each year. Either two or three eclipses happen each eclipse season. In the sequence below, each eclipse is separated by a fortnight.

Eclipse season of August–September 2053
August 29 Descending node (full moon)	September 12 Ascending node (new moon)
Penumbral lunar eclipse Lunar Saros 119	Total solar eclipse Solar Saros 145

== Related eclipses ==
=== Eclipses in 2053 ===
- A penumbral lunar eclipse on March 4.
- An annular solar eclipse on March 20.
- A penumbral lunar eclipse on August 29.
- A total solar eclipse on September 12.

=== Metonic ===
- Preceded by: Lunar eclipse of November 9, 2049
- Followed by: Lunar eclipse of June 17, 2057

=== Tzolkinex ===
- Preceded by: Lunar eclipse of July 18, 2046
- Followed by: Lunar eclipse of October 9, 2060

=== Half-Saros ===
- Preceded by: Solar eclipse of August 23, 2044
- Followed by: Solar eclipse of September 3, 2062

=== Tritos ===
- Preceded by: Lunar eclipse of September 29, 2042
- Followed by: Lunar eclipse of July 28, 2064

=== Lunar Saros 119 ===
- Preceded by: Lunar eclipse of August 19, 2035
- Followed by: Lunar eclipse of September 9, 2071

=== Inex ===
- Preceded by: Lunar eclipse of September 18, 2024
- Followed by: Lunar eclipse of August 8, 2082

=== Triad ===
- Preceded by: Lunar eclipse of October 29, 1966
- Followed by: Lunar eclipse of June 30, 2140

=== Lunar eclipses of 2053–2056 ===
This eclipse is a member of a semester series. An eclipse in a semester series of lunar eclipses repeats approximately every 177 days and 4 hours (a semester) at alternating nodes of the Moon's orbit.

The penumbral lunar eclipses on June 27, 2056 and December 22, 2056 occur in the next lunar year eclipse set.

Lunar eclipse series sets from 2053 to 2056
Ascending node				Descending node			
Saros	Date Viewing	Type Chart	Gamma	Saros	Date Viewing	Type Chart	Gamma
114	2053 Mar 04	Penumbral	−1.0530	119	2053 Aug 29	Penumbral	1.0165
124	2054 Feb 22	Total	−0.3242	129	2054 Aug 18	Total	0.2806
134	2055 Feb 11	Total	0.3526	139	2055 Aug 07	Partial	−0.4769
144	2056 Feb 01	Penumbral	1.0682	149	2056 Jul 26	Partial	−1.2048

=== Saros 119 ===
This eclipse is a part of Saros series 119, repeating every 18 years, 11 days, and containing 82 events. The series started with a penumbral lunar eclipse on October 14, 935 AD. It contains partial eclipses from May 18, 1296 through August 2, 1422; total eclipses from August 13, 1440 through June 15, 1927; and a second set of partial eclipses from June 25, 1945 through August 19, 2035. The series ends at member 82 as a penumbral eclipse on March 25, 2396.

The longest duration of totality was produced by member 49 at 102 minutes, 6 seconds on March 30, 1801. All eclipses in this series occur at the Moon’s descending node of orbit.

Greatest	First			
The greatest eclipse of the series occurred on 1801 Mar 30, lasting 102 minutes, 6 seconds.	Penumbral	Partial	Total	Central
The greatest eclipse of the series occurred on 1801 Mar 30, lasting 102 minutes, 6 seconds.	934 Oct 14	1296 May 18	1440 Aug 13	1512 Sep 25
The greatest eclipse of the series occurred on 1801 Mar 30, lasting 102 minutes, 6 seconds.	Last			
The greatest eclipse of the series occurred on 1801 Mar 30, lasting 102 minutes, 6 seconds.	Central	Total	Partial	Penumbral
The greatest eclipse of the series occurred on 1801 Mar 30, lasting 102 minutes, 6 seconds.	1873 May 12	1927 Jun 15	2035 Aug 19	2396 Mar 25

Eclipses are tabulated in three columns; every third eclipse in the same column is one exeligmos apart, so they all cast shadows over approximately the same parts of the Earth.

Series members 49–71 occur between 1801 and 2200:
49	50	51
1801 Mar 30	1819 Apr 10	1837 Apr 20
52	53	54
1855 May 02	1873 May 12	1891 May 23
55	56	57
1909 Jun 04	1927 Jun 15	1945 Jun 25
58	59	60
1963 Jul 06	1981 Jul 17	1999 Jul 28
61	62	63
2017 Aug 07	2035 Aug 19	2053 Aug 29
64	65	66
2071 Sep 09	2089 Sep 19	2107 Oct 02
67	68	69
2125 Oct 12	2143 Oct 23	2161 Nov 03
70	71	
2179 Nov 14	2197 Nov 24	

=== Tritos series ===
This eclipse is a part of a tritos cycle, repeating at alternating nodes every 135 synodic months (≈ 3986.63 days, or 11 years minus 1 month). Their appearance and longitude are irregular due to a lack of synchronization with the anomalistic month (period of perigee), but groupings of 3 tritos cycles (≈ 33 years minus 3 months) come close (≈ 434.044 anomalistic months), so eclipses are similar in these groupings.

Series members between 1835 and 2200
1835 May 12 (Saros 99)	1846 Apr 11 (Saros 100)		1868 Feb 08 (Saros 102)	1879 Jan 08 (Saros 103)
				1933 Aug 05 (Saros 108)
1944 Jul 06 (Saros 109)	1955 Jun 05 (Saros 110)	1966 May 04 (Saros 111)	1977 Apr 04 (Saros 112)	1988 Mar 03 (Saros 113)
1999 Jan 31 (Saros 114)	2009 Dec 31 (Saros 115)	2020 Nov 30 (Saros 116)	2031 Oct 30 (Saros 117)	2042 Sep 29 (Saros 118)
2053 Aug 29 (Saros 119)	2064 Jul 28 (Saros 120)	2075 Jun 28 (Saros 121)	2086 May 28 (Saros 122)	2097 Apr 26 (Saros 123)
2108 Mar 27 (Saros 124)	2119 Feb 25 (Saros 125)	2130 Jan 24 (Saros 126)	2140 Dec 23 (Saros 127)	2151 Nov 24 (Saros 128)
2162 Oct 23 (Saros 129)	2173 Sep 21 (Saros 130)	2184 Aug 21 (Saros 131)	2195 Jul 22 (Saros 132)	

=== Inex series ===
This eclipse is a part of the long period inex cycle, repeating at alternating nodes, every 358 synodic months (≈ 10,571.95 days, or 29 years minus 20 days). Their appearance and longitude are irregular due to a lack of synchronization with the anomalistic month (period of perigee). However, groupings of 3 inex cycles (≈ 87 years minus 2 months) comes close (≈ 1,151.02 anomalistic months), so eclipses are similar in these groupings.

Series members between 1801 and 2200
1822 Feb 06 (Saros 111)	1851 Jan 17 (Saros 112)	1879 Dec 28 (Saros 113)
1908 Dec 07 (Saros 114)	1937 Nov 18 (Saros 115)	1966 Oct 29 (Saros 116)
1995 Oct 08 (Saros 117)	2024 Sep 18 (Saros 118)	2053 Aug 29 (Saros 119)
2082 Aug 08 (Saros 120)	2111 Jul 21 (Saros 121)	2140 Jun 30 (Saros 122)
2169 Jun 09 (Saros 123)	2198 May 20 (Saros 124)	

=== Half-Saros cycle ===
A lunar eclipse will be preceded and followed by solar eclipses by 9 years and 5.5 days (a half saros). This lunar eclipse is related to two solar eclipses of Solar Saros 126.

August 23, 2044	September 3, 2062

== See also ==
- List of lunar eclipses and List of 21st-century lunar eclipses
