= Lunar Saros 119 =

Eclipse cycle of the moon

Member 61
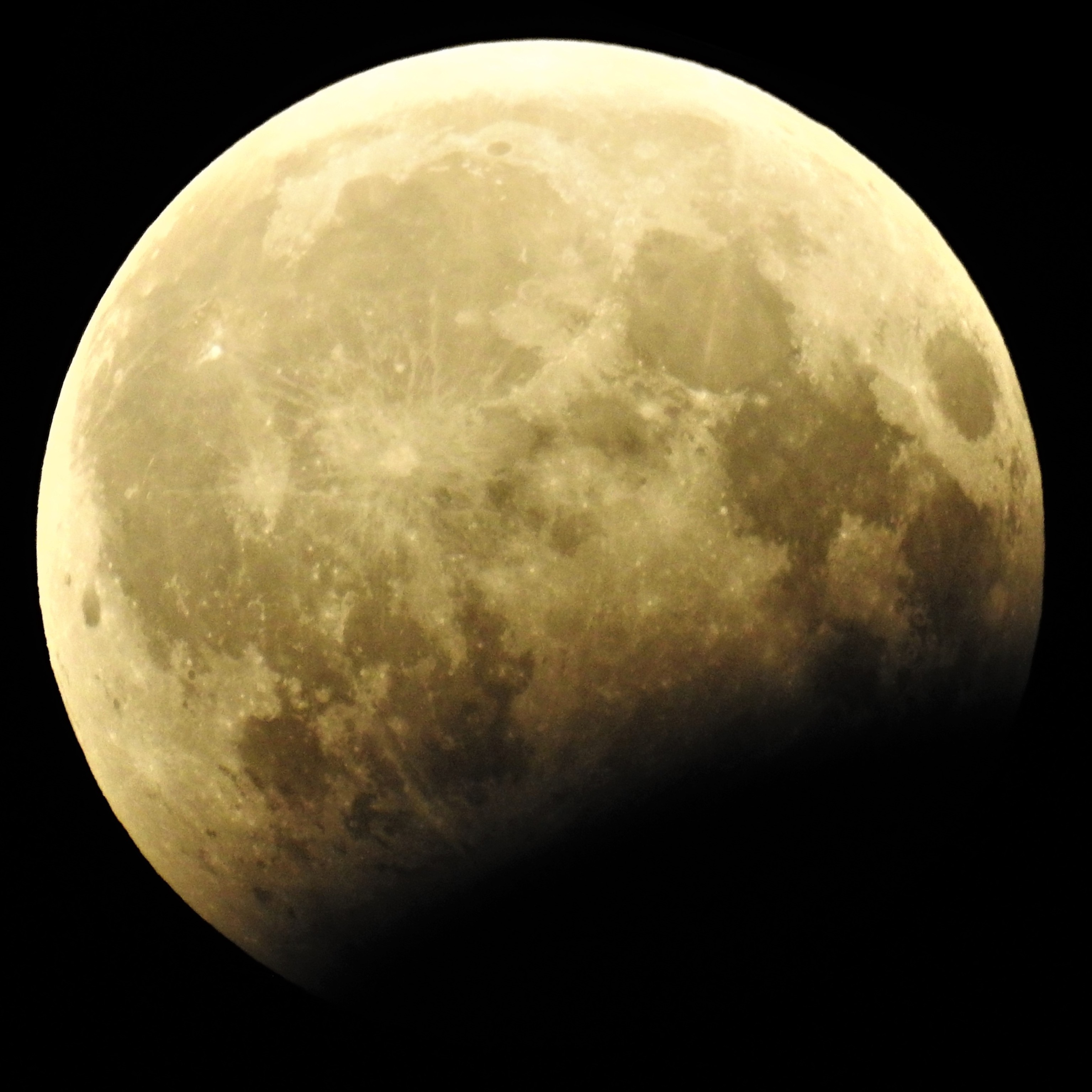

2017 Aug 07

Saros cycle series 119 for lunar eclipses occurs at the moon's descending node, repeats every 18 years 11 and 1/3 days. It contains 82 events.

This lunar saros is linked to Solar Saros 126.

Cat.	Saros	Mem	Date	Time UT (hr:mn)	Type	Gamma	Magnitude	Duration (min)			Contacts UT (hr:mn)						Chart
Cat.	Saros	Mem	Date	Greatest	Type	Gamma	Magnitude	Pen.	Par.	Tot.	P1	P4	U1	U2	U3	U4	Chart
07069	119	1	935 Oct 14	19:25:58	Penumbral	-1.5283	-0.9379	57.9			18:57:01	19:54:55					
07110	119	2	953 Oct 25	3:56:18	Penumbral	-1.5085	-0.9018	77.4			3:17:36	4:35:00					
07151	119	3	971 Nov 05	12:34:29	Penumbral	-1.4945	-0.8761	88.5			11:50:14	13:18:44					
07192	119	4	989 Nov 15	21:17:18	Penumbral	-1.4842	-0.8571	95.6			20:29:30	22:05:06					
07236	119	5	1007 Nov 27	6:04:31	Penumbral	-1.4772	-0.8438	99.9			5:14:34	6:54:28					
07281	119	6	1025 Dec 07	14:53:57	Penumbral	-1.4718	-0.8335	102.9			14:02:30	15:45:24					
07325	119	7	1043 Dec 18	23:45:22	Penumbral	-1.4678	-0.8254	104.9			22:52:55	0:37:49					
07369	119	8	1061 Dec 29	8:34:39	Penumbral	-1.4621	-0.8139	107.8			7:40:45	9:28:33					
07413	119	9	1080 Jan 09	17:22:50	Penumbral	-1.4555	-0.8005	111.1			16:27:17	18:18:23					
07459	119	10	1098 Jan 20	2:06:11	Penumbral	-1.4449	-0.7796	116.3			1:08:02	3:04:20					
07505	119	11	1116 Jan 31	10:45:59	Penumbral	-1.4315	-0.7536	122.5			9:44:44	11:47:14					
07551	119	12	1134 Feb 10	19:17:59	Penumbral	-1.4116	-0.7155	131.4			18:12:17	20:23:41					
07597	119	13	1152 Feb 22	3:44:59	Penumbral	-1.3878	-0.6699	141.2			2:34:23	4:55:35					
07645	119	14	1170 Mar 4	12:03:29	Penumbral	-1.3569	-0.6115	152.9			10:47:02	13:19:56					
07691	119	15	1188 Mar 14	20:15:07	Penumbral	-1.3205	-0.5431	165.4			18:52:25	21:37:49					
07737	119	16	1206 Mar 26	4:18:08	Penumbral	-1.2770	-0.4617	178.9			2:48:41	5:47:35					
07783	119	17	1224 Apr 05	12:15:00	Penumbral	-1.2286	-0.3714	192.4			10:38:48	13:51:12					
07829	119	18	1242 Apr 16	20:04:30	Penumbral	-1.1740	-0.2699	206.0			18:21:30	21:47:30					
07874	119	19	1260 Apr 27	3:47:29	Penumbral	-1.1141	-0.1590	219.4			1:57:47	5:37:11					
07919	119	20	1278 May 8	11:25:14	Penumbral	-1.0501	-0.0408	232.3			9:29:05	13:21:23					
07964	119	21	1296 May 18	18:58:30	Partial	-0.9826	0.0835	244.5	62.3		16:56:15	21:00:45	18:27:21			19:29:39	
08008	119	22	1314 May 30	2:28:18	Partial	-0.9123	0.2128	255.9	97.7		0:20:21	4:36:15	1:39:27			3:17:09	
08051	119	23	1332 Jun 09	9:55:11	Partial	-0.8396	0.3459	266.5	122.3		7:41:56	12:08:26	8:54:02			10:56:20	
08092	119	24	1350 Jun 20	17:21:47	Partial	-0.7670	0.4788	276.0	141.2		15:03:47	19:39:47	16:11:11			18:32:23	
08133	119	25	1368 Jul 01	0:48:23	Partial	-0.6948	0.6105	284.5	156.4		22:26:08	3:10:38	23:30:11			2:06:35	
08174	119	26	1386 Jul 12	8:15:58	Partial	-0.6236	0.7399	292.1	168.9		5:49:55	10:42:01	6:51:31			9:40:25	
08215	119	27	1404 Jul 22	15:46:36	Partial	-0.5553	0.8639	298.6	178.9		13:17:18	18:15:54	14:17:09			17:16:03	
08256	119	28	1422 Aug 02	23:20:42	Partial	-0.4902	0.9817	304.3	187.1		20:48:33	1:52:51	21:47:09			0:54:15	
08298	119	29	1440 Aug 13	7:00:03	Total	-0.4299	1.0904	309.1	193.5	44.1	4:25:30	9:34:36	5:23:18	6:38:00	7:22:06	8:36:48	
08339	119	30	1458 Aug 24	14:43:49	Total	-0.3737	1.1913	313.2	198.7	62.2	12:07:13	17:20:25	13:04:28	14:12:43	15:14:55	16:23:10	
08380	119	31	1476 Sep 03	22:34:58	Total	-0.3243	1.2797	316.7	202.7	73.1	19:56:37	1:13:19	20:53:37	21:58:25	23:11:31	0:16:19	
08420	119	32	1494 Sep 15	6:32:25	Total	-0.2805	1.3576	319.6	205.8	80.5	3:52:37	9:12:13	4:49:31	5:52:10	7:12:40	8:15:19	
08460	119	33	1512 Sep 25	14:37:20	Total	-0.2434	1.4232	322.1	208.1	85.6	11:56:17	17:18:23	12:53:17	13:54:32	15:20:08	16:21:23	
08501	119	34	1530 Oct 06	22:49:14	Total	-0.2126	1.4771	324.3	209.9	89.0	20:07:05	1:31:23	21:04:17	22:04:44	23:33:44	0:34:11	
08542	119	35	1548 Oct 17	7:08:29	Total	-0.1885	1.5189	326.1	211.2	91.4	4:25:26	9:51:32	5:22:53	6:22:47	7:54:11	8:54:05	
08586	119	36	1566 Oct 28	15:34:06	Total	-0.1704	1.5498	327.8	212.2	92.9	12:50:12	18:18:00	13:48:00	14:47:39	16:20:33	17:20:12	
08629	119	37	1584 Nov 18	0:04:27	Total	-0.1567	1.5727	329.3	213.1	94.0	21:19:48	2:49:06	22:17:54	23:17:27	0:51:27	1:51:00	
08672	119	38	1602 Nov 29	8:40:26	Total	-0.1482	1.5861	330.7	213.7	94.6	5:55:05	11:25:47	6:53:35	7:53:08	9:27:44	10:27:17	
08717	119	39	1620 Dec 09	17:19:13	Total	-0.1423	1.5951	332.0	214.3	95.1	14:33:13	20:05:13	15:32:04	16:31:40	18:06:46	19:06:22	
08761	119	40	1638 Dec 21	2:00:39	Total	-0.1393	1.5989	333.3	214.8	95.4	23:14:00	4:47:18	0:13:15	1:12:57	2:48:21	3:48:03	
08805	119	41	1656 Dec 31	10:41:02	Total	-0.1359	1.6037	334.5	215.4	95.7	7:53:47	13:28:17	8:53:20	9:53:11	11:28:53	12:28:44	
08850	119	42	1675 Jan 11	19:21:44	Total	-0.1334	1.6073	335.7	216.0	96.0	16:33:53	22:09:35	17:33:44	18:33:44	20:09:44	21:09:44	
08896	119	43	1693 Jan 22	3:58:35	Total	-0.1278	1.6167	336.9	216.7	96.6	1:10:08	6:47:02	2:10:14	3:10:17	4:46:53	5:46:56	
08943	119	44	1711 Feb 03	12:31:30	Total	-0.1197	1.6310	338.1	217.5	97.3	9:42:27	15:20:33	10:42:45	11:42:51	13:20:09	14:20:15	
08990	119	45	1729 Feb 13	20:57:43	Total	-0.1065	1.6548	339.4	218.4	98.2	18:08:01	23:47:25	19:08:31	20:08:37	21:46:49	22:46:55	
09036	119	46	1747 Feb 25	5:17:43	Total	-0.0887	1.6871	340.7	219.4	99.3	2:27:22	8:08:04	3:28:01	4:28:04	6:07:22	7:07:25	
09083	119	47	1765 Mar 07	13:28:56	Total	-0.0643	1.7318	342.0	220.5	100.5	10:37:56	16:19:56	11:38:41	12:38:41	14:19:11	15:19:11	
09128	119	48	1783 Mar 18	21:31:30	Total	-0.0333	1.7886	343.3	221.5	101.5	18:39:51	0:23:09	19:40:45	20:40:45	22:22:15	23:22:15	
09173	119	49	1801 Mar 30	5:24:05	Total	0.0052	1.8400	344.5	222.3	102.1	2:31:50	8:16:20	3:32:56	4:33:02	6:15:08	7:15:14	
09218	119	50	1819 Apr 10	13:07:53	Total	0.0502	1.7574	345.4	222.7	101.8	10:15:11	16:00:35	11:16:32	12:16:59	13:58:47	14:59:14	
09264	119	51	1837 Apr 20	20:40:45	Total	0.1033	1.6597	346.0	222.5	100.2	17:47:45	23:33:45	18:49:30	19:50:39	21:30:51	22:32:00	
09310	119	52	1855 May 02	4:05:23	Total	0.1625	1.5509	346.1	221.5	96.5	1:12:20	6:58:26	2:14:38	3:17:08	4:53:38	5:56:08	
09354	119	53	1873 May 12	11:20:26	Total	0.2284	1.4294	345.5	219.3	89.9	8:27:41	14:13:11	9:30:47	10:35:29	12:05:23	13:10:05	
09398	119	54	1891 May 23	18:29:11	Total	0.2988	1.2996	344.1	215.7	79.1	15:37:08	21:21:14	16:41:20	17:49:38	19:08:44	20:17:02	
09441	119	55	1909 Jun 04	1:28:51	Total	0.3755	1.1580	341.6	210.2	60.4	22:38:03	4:19:39	23:43:45	0:58:39	1:59:03	3:13:57	
09483	119	56	1927 Jun 15	8:24:41	Total	0.4543	1.0123	338.1	202.8	17.7	5:35:38	11:13:44	6:43:17	8:15:50	8:33:32	10:06:05	
09525	119	57	1945 Jun 25	15:14:22	Partial	0.5370	0.8593	333.3	192.7		12:27:43	18:01:01	13:38:01			16:50:43	
09566	119	58	1963 Jul 06	22:02:59	Partial	0.6197	0.7060	327.2	179.9		19:19:23	0:46:35	20:33:02			23:32:56	
09607	119	59	1981 Jul 17	4:47:40	Partial	0.7045	0.5486	319.6	163.2		2:07:52	7:27:28	3:26:04			6:09:16	
09648	119	60	1999 Jul 28	11:34:46	Partial	0.7862	0.3966	310.9	142.5		8:59:19	14:10:13	10:23:31			12:46:01	
09689	119	61	2017 Aug 07	18:21:38	Partial	0.8668	0.2464	300.9	115.2		15:51:11	20:52:05	17:24:02			19:19:14	
09730	119	62	2035 Aug 19	1:12:15	Partial	0.9433	0.1037	289.8	76.5		22:47:21	3:37:09	0:34:00			1:50:30	
09770	119	63	2053 Aug 29	8:05:50	Penumbral	1.0164	-0.0330	277.8			5:46:56	10:24:44					
09811	119	64	2071 Sep 09	15:05:41	Penumbral	1.0834	-0.1586	265.2			12:53:05	17:18:17					
09852	119	65	2089 Sep 19	22:11:17	Penumbral	1.1447	-0.2737	252.2			20:05:11	0:17:23					
09895	119	66	2107 Oct 02	5:23:19	Penumbral	1.1997	-0.3775	239.2			3:23:43	7:22:55					
09937	119	67	2125 Oct 12	12:43:06	Penumbral	1.2476	-0.4679	226.6			10:49:48	14:36:24					
09980	119	68	2143 Oct 23	20:10:38	Penumbral	1.2885	-0.5457	214.8			18:23:14	21:58:02					
10024	119	69	2161 Nov 03	3:45:49	Penumbral	1.3226	-0.6107	204.1			2:03:46	5:27:52					
10067	119	70	2179 Nov 14	11:28:05	Penumbral	1.3504	-0.6641	194.8			9:50:41	13:05:29					
10110	119	71	2197 Nov 24	19:17:17	Penumbral	1.3722	-0.7061	187.0			17:43:47	20:50:47					
10154	119	72	2215 Dec 07	3:12:05	Penumbral	1.3891	-0.7388	180.7			1:41:44	4:42:26					
10198	119	73	2233 Dec 17	11:10:37	Penumbral	1.4027	-0.7651	175.4			9:42:55	12:38:19					
10243	119	74	2251 Dec 28	19:12:49	Penumbral	1.4131	-0.7853	171.1			17:47:16	20:38:22					
10289	119	75	2270 Jan 08	3:16:20	Penumbral	1.4224	-0.8031	167.1			1:52:47	4:39:53					
10335	119	76	2288 Jan 19	11:19:30	Penumbral	1.4316	-0.8203	162.8			9:58:06	12:40:54					
10381	119	77	2306 Jan 30	19:20:01	Penumbral	1.4427	-0.8406	157.2			18:01:25	20:38:37					
10427	119	78	2324 Feb 11	3:17:27	Penumbral	1.4561	-0.8646	149.9			2:02:30	4:32:24					
10473	119	79	2342 Feb 21	11:09:44	Penumbral	1.4735	-0.8958	139.6			9:59:56	12:19:32					
10518	119	80	2360 Mar 03	18:54:38	Penumbral	1.4964	-0.9366	124.5			17:52:23	19:56:53					
10563	119	81	2378 Mar 15	2:32:23	Penumbral	1.5246	-0.9871	102.5			1:41:08	3:23:38					
10607	119	82	2396 Mar 25	10:01:24	Penumbral	1.5593	-1.0492	65.1			9:28:51	10:33:57					

== See also ==
- List of lunar eclipses
  - List of Saros series for lunar eclipses
