= Solar Saros 126 =

Saros cycle series 126 for solar eclipses

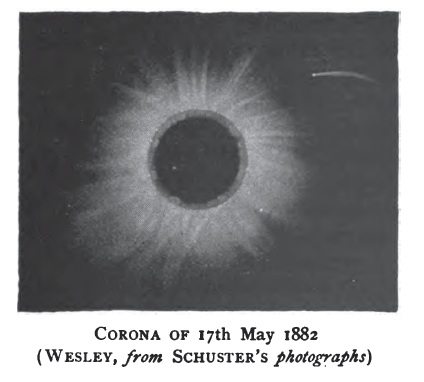
May 17, 1882 Series member 40

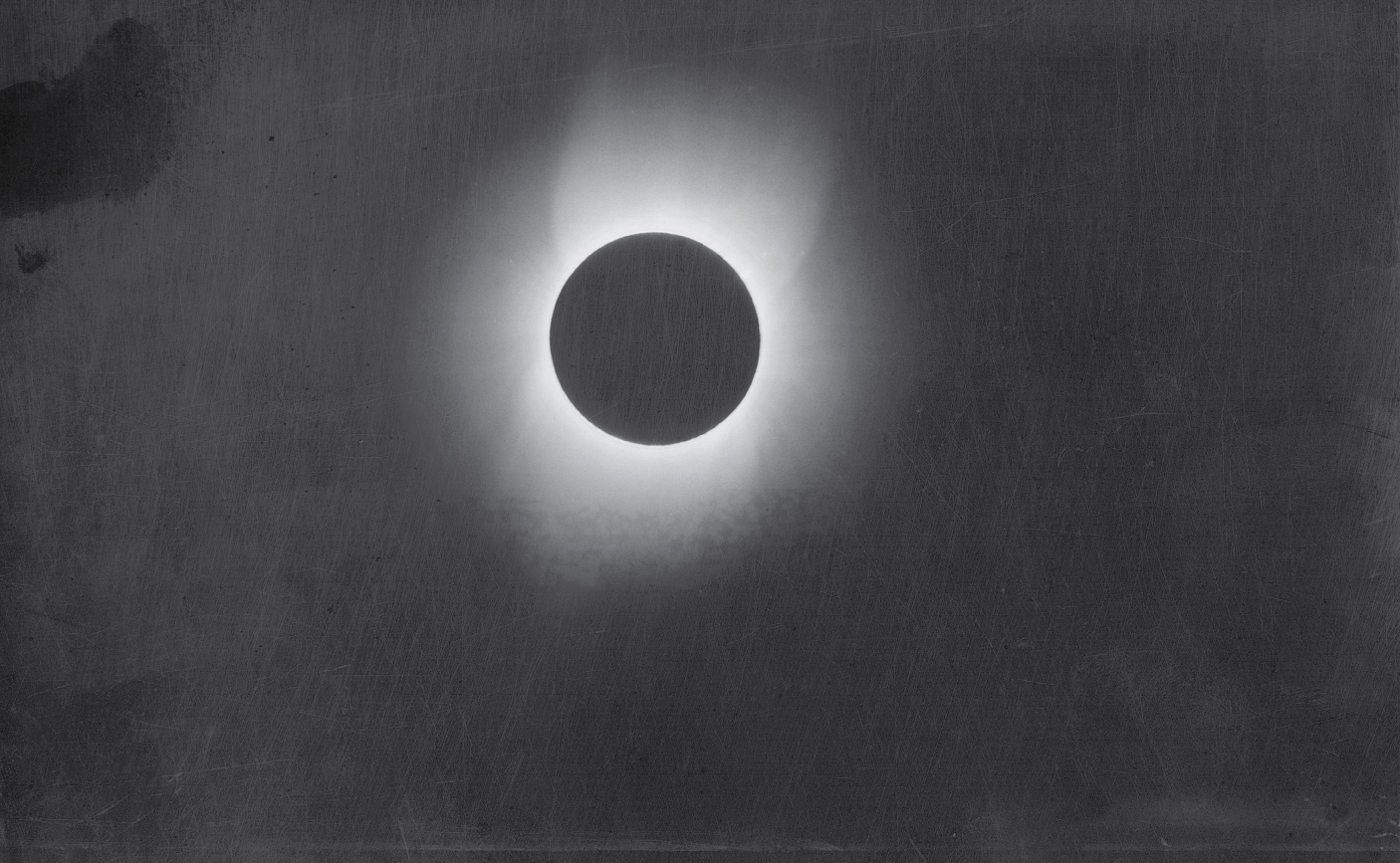
Total solar eclipse of May 28, 1900, photographed in Wadesboro, North Carolina by Thomas Smillie for the Smithsonian Solar Eclipse Expedition to capture photographic proof of the solar corona. Series member 41

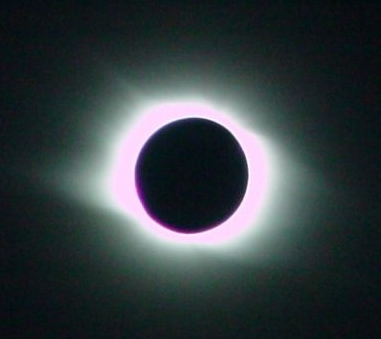
Total solar eclipse of August 1, 2008 from Novosibirsk, Russia. Series member 47

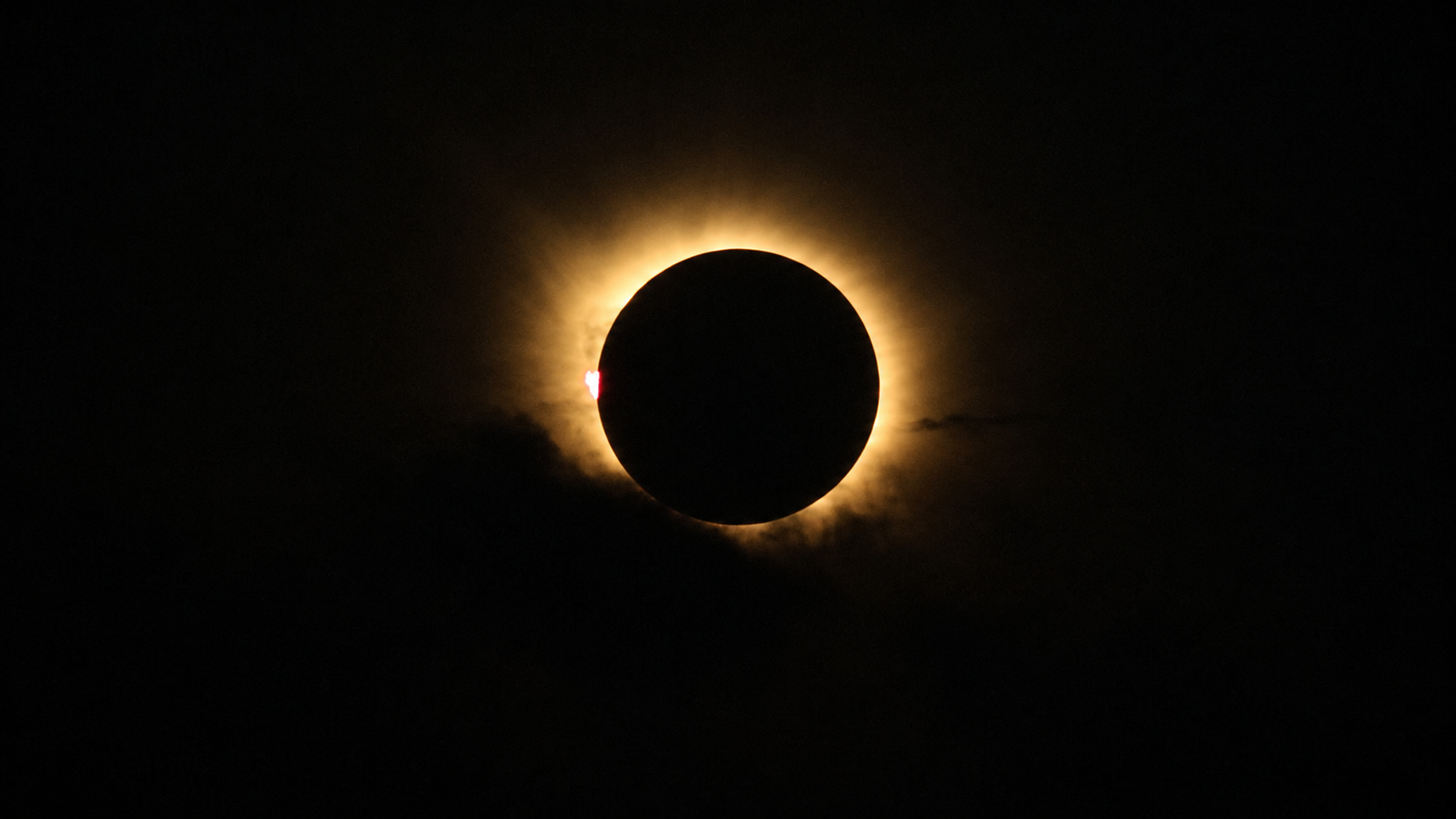
Total solar eclipse of August 12, 2026 from Valencia, Spain. Series member 48

Saros 126

Saros cycle series 126 for solar eclipses occurs at the Moon's descending node, repeating every 18 years and 11 days, containing 72 eclipses, 41 of which are umbral (28 annular, 3 hybrid, 10 total). The first eclipse was on 10 March 1179 and the last will be on 3 May 2459, lasting 1,280 years. The most recent eclipse was a total eclipse on 12 August 2026 and the next will be a total eclipse on 23 August 2044.

The longest totality was 2 minutes 36 seconds on 10 July 1972 and the longest annular was 6 minutes 30 seconds on 26 June 1359.

This solar saros is linked to Lunar Saros 119.

== Umbral eclipses ==
Umbral eclipses (annular, total and hybrid) can be further classified as either: 1) Central (two limits), 2) Central (one limit) or 3) Non-Central (one limit). The statistical distribution of these classes in Saros series 126 appears in the following table.

Classification	Number	Percent
All Umbral eclipses	41	100.00%
Central (two limits)	40	97.56%
Central (one limit)	1	2.44%
Non-central (one limit)	0	0.00%

== All eclipses ==
Note: Dates are given in the Julian calendar prior to 15 October 1582, and in the Gregorian calendar after that.

Saros	Member	Date	Time (Greatest) UTC	Type	Location Lat, Long	Gamma	Mag.	Width (km)	Duration (min:sec)	Ref
126	1	March 10, 1179	7:39:51	Partial	72S 165.4E	-1.5356	0.0536			
126	2	March 20, 1197	14:48:56	Partial	72S 43.8E	-1.488	0.1327			
126	3	March 31, 1215	21:50:41	Partial	71.7S 75.8W	-1.4344	0.2222			
126	4	April 11, 1233	4:41:24	Partial	71.2S 167.7E	-1.3717	0.3278			
126	5	April 22, 1251	11:26:32	Partial	70.5S 53.1E	-1.3041	0.4423			
126	6	May 2, 1269	18:03:15	Partial	69.7S 58.8W	-1.2291	0.5699			
126	7	May 14, 1287	0:35:25	Partial	68.8S 169W	-1.15	0.7052			
126	8	May 24, 1305	7:02:17	Partial	67.8S 82.8E	-1.0658	0.8496			
126	9	June 4, 1323	13:27:55	Annular (Note: No southern limit)	56.1S 23.4W	-0.9799	0.9383	-	5m 59s	
126	10	June 14, 1341	19:52:10	Annular	39.6S 123.3W	-0.8922	0.9433	465	6m 25s	
126	11	June 26, 1359	2:16:31	Annular	29.9S 138.3E	-0.8038	0.9463	330	6m 30s	
126	12	July 6, 1377	8:43:28	Annular	22.8S 40.2E	-0.7168	0.9484	269	6m 24s	
126	13	July 17, 1395	15:14:16	Annular	17.7S 58.2W	-0.6318	0.9497	234	6m 12s	
126	14	July 27, 1413	21:50:24	Annular	14.1S 157.5W	-0.5506	0.9506	214	5m 58s	
126	15	August 8, 1431	4:33:00	Annular	12S 102E	-0.4737	0.9509	201	5m 45s	
126	16	August 18, 1449	11:24:05	Annular	11.1S 0.5W	-0.403	0.9509	194	5m 35s	
126	17	August 29, 1467	18:24:29	Annular	11.3S 105.2W	-0.3391	0.9505	191	5m 29s	
126	18	September 9, 1485	1:33:06	Annular	12.4S 148E	-0.2811	0.95	190	5m 26s	
126	19	September 20, 1503	8:52:38	Annular	14.1S 38.5E	-0.2314	0.9494	190	5m 27s	
126	20	September 30, 1521	16:21:42	Annular	16.2S 73.3W	-0.1892	0.9489	191	5m 30s	
126	21	October 12, 1539	0:01:45	Annular	18.7S 172.2E	-0.1551	0.9484	192	5m 35s	
126	22	October 22, 1557	7:49:28	Annular	21.1S 56E	-0.1266	0.9482	192	5m 40s	
126	23	November 2, 1575	15:47:27	Annular	23.5S 62.6W	-0.1061	0.9483	191	5m 44s	
126	24	November 22, 1593	23:52:06	Annular	25.4S 177.5E	-0.0906	0.9488	189	5m 47s	
126	25	December 4, 1611	8:03:43	Annular	26.9S 56E	-0.0803	0.9498	185	5m 44s	
126	26	December 14, 1629	16:19:07	Annular	27.6S 66.2W	-0.0725	0.9513	179	5m 38s	
126	27	December 26, 1647	0:38:35	Annular	27.4S 170.6E	-0.0675	0.9535	170	5m 25s	
126	28	January 5, 1666	8:58:51	Annular	26.3S 47.1E	-0.0624	0.9562	160	5m 7s	
126	29	January 16, 1684	17:18:53	Annular	24.2S 76.7W	-0.0565	0.9596	147	4m 43s	
126	30	January 28, 1702	1:37:10	Annular	21.2S 159.6E	-0.0484	0.9636	132	4m 14s	
126	31	February 8, 1720	9:52:31	Annular	17.4S 36.1E	-0.0375	0.9681	115	3m 40s	
126	32	February 18, 1738	18:02:31	Annular	12.8S 86.7W	-0.0211	0.9732	96	3m 3s	
126	33	March 1, 1756	2:07:09	Annular	7.5S 151.4E	0.0006	0.9787	76	2m 24s	
126	34	March 12, 1774	10:05:14	Annular	1.7S 30.8E	0.0284	0.9845	55	1m 43s	
126	35	March 22, 1792	17:57:34	Annular	4.5N 88.7W	0.0618	0.9905	33	1m 2s	
126	36	April 4, 1810	1:41:19	Annular	11.1N 153.8E	0.1031	0.9967	12	0m 21s	
126	37	April 14, 1828	9:19:38	Hybrid	17.9N 37.7E	0.1498	1.0029	10	0m 18s	
126	38	April 25, 1846	16:50:30	Hybrid	24.8N 76.2W	0.2038	1.0088	31	0m 53s	
126	39	May 6, 1864	0:16:48	Hybrid	31.6N 171.5E	0.2622	1.0146	52	1m 25s	
126	40	May 17, 1882	7:36:27	Total	38.4N 61.6E	0.3269	1.02	72	1m 50s	
126	41	May 28, 1900	14:53:56	Total	44.8N 46.5W	0.3943	1.0249	92	2m 10s	
126	42	June 8, 1918	22:07:43	Total	50.9N 152W	0.4658	1.0292	112	2m 23s	
126	43	June 19, 1936	5:20:31	Total	56.1N 104.7E	0.5389	1.0329	132	2m 31s	
126	44	June 30, 1954	12:32:38	Total	60.5N 4.2E	0.6135	1.0357	153	2m 35s	
126	45	July 10, 1972	19:46:38	Total	63.5N 94.2W	0.6872	1.0379	175	2m 36s	
126	46	July 22, 1990	3:03:07	Total	65.2N 168.9E	0.7597	1.0391	201	2m 33s	
126	47	August 1, 2008	10:22:12	Total	65.7N 72.3E	0.8307	1.0394	237	2m 27s	
126	48	August 12, 2026	17:47:06	Total	65.2N 25.2W	0.8977	1.0386	294	2m 18s	
126	49	August 23, 2044	1:17:02	Total	64.3N 120.4W	0.9613	1.0364	453	2m 4s	
126	50	September 3, 2062	8:54:27	Partial	61.3N 150.3E	1.0191	0.9749			
126	51	September 13, 2080	16:38:09	Partial	61.1N 25.8E	1.0723	0.8743			
126	52	September 25, 2098	0:31:16	Partial	61.1N 101W	1.1184	0.7871			
126	53	October 6, 2116	8:31:51	Partial	61.2N 130.4E	1.1589	0.7105			
126	54	October 17, 2134	16:40:42	Partial	61.5N 0.4W	1.1931	0.6458			
126	55	October 28, 2152	0:57:34	Partial	61.9N 133.3W	1.2213	0.5926			
126	56	November 8, 2170	9:23:07	Partial	62.5N 91.6E	1.2426	0.5524			
126	57	November 18, 2188	17:55:25	Partial	63.2N 45.5W	1.2591	0.5212			
126	58	December 1, 2206	2:33:55	Partial	64.1N 175.7E	1.2711	0.4985			
126	59	December 11, 2224	11:17:51	Partial	65N 35.2E	1.2791	0.4834			
126	60	December 22, 2242	20:06:40	Partial	66N 106.9W	1.2836	0.475			
126	61	January 2, 2261	4:56:54	Partial	67.1N 110.2E	1.2873	0.4679			
126	62	January 13, 2279	13:49:06	Partial	68.2N 33.7W	1.2899	0.463			
126	63	January 23, 2297	22:39:47	Partial	69.2N 177.8W	1.294	0.455			
126	64	February 5, 2315	7:29:49	Partial	70.1N 37.6E	1.2991	0.4453			
126	65	February 15, 2333	16:14:20	Partial	70.9N 106.2W	1.3087	0.427			
126	66	February 27, 2351	0:56:12	Partial	71.5N 110.1E	1.3209	0.4037			
126	67	March 9, 2369	9:30:24	Partial	71.9N 32.2W	1.3392	0.3686			
126	68	March 20, 2387	17:59:08	Partial	72.1N 173.3W	1.3624	0.3241			
126	69	March 31, 2405	2:18:52	Partial	71.9N 47.9E	1.3928	0.2654			
126	70	April 11, 2423	10:32:40	Partial	71.6N 89.1W	1.4282	0.197			
126	71	April 21, 2441	18:37:49	Partial	71N 136.4E	1.4706	0.1149			
126	72	May 3, 2459	2:35:54	Partial	70.3N 4.3E	1.5188	0.0214			
