= June 2075 lunar eclipse =

Future partial lunar eclipse

- Partial eclipse
- Date: June 28, 2075
- Gamma: 0.6897
- Magnitude: 0.6235
- Saros cycle: 121 (59 of 84)
- Partiality: 156 minutes, 58 seconds
- Penumbral: 283 minutes, 25 seconds
Contacts (UTC)
- P1: 7:31:26
- U1: 8:34:40
- Greatest: 9:53:09
- U4: 11:11:38
- P4: 12:14:51

A partial lunar eclipse will occur at the Moon’s descending node of orbit on Friday, June 28, 2075, with an umbral magnitude of 0.6235. A lunar eclipse occurs when the Moon moves into the Earth's shadow, causing the Moon to be darkened. A partial lunar eclipse occurs when one part of the Moon is in the Earth's umbra, while the other part is in the Earth's penumbra. Unlike a solar eclipse, which can only be viewed from a relatively small area of the world, a lunar eclipse may be viewed from anywhere on the night side of Earth. Occurring only about 5.5 hours after perigee (on June 28, 2075, at 4:10 UTC), the Moon's apparent diameter will be larger.

== Visibility ==
The eclipse will be completely visible over eastern Australia, western North America, Antarctica, and the central and eastern Pacific Ocean, seen rising over east Asia and western Australia and setting over much of North and South America.

== Eclipse details ==
Shown below is a table displaying details about this particular solar eclipse. It describes various parameters pertaining to this eclipse.

June 28, 2075 Lunar Eclipse Parameters
| Parameter | Value |
|---|---|
| Penumbral Magnitude | 1.56389 |
| Umbral Magnitude | 0.62349 |
| Gamma | 0.68971 |
| Sun Right Ascension | 06h29m58.9s |
| Sun Declination | +23°14'59.1" |
| Sun Semi-Diameter | 15'44.0" |
| Sun Equatorial Horizontal Parallax | 08.7" |
| Moon Right Ascension | 18h30m07.3s |
| Moon Declination | -22°32'40.9" |
| Moon Semi-Diameter | 16'43.9" |
| Moon Equatorial Horizontal Parallax | 1°01'24.3" |
| ΔT | 104.0 s |

== Eclipse season ==
This eclipse is part of an eclipse season, a period, roughly every six months, when eclipses occur. Only two (or occasionally three) eclipse seasons occur each year, and each season lasts about 35 days and repeats just short of six months (173 days) later; thus two full eclipse seasons always occur each year. Either two or three eclipses happen each eclipse season. In the sequence below, each eclipse is separated by a fortnight.

Eclipse season of June–July 2075
| June 28 Descending node (full moon) | July 13 Ascending node (new moon) |
|---|---|
| Partial lunar eclipse Lunar Saros 121 | Annular solar eclipse Solar Saros 147 |

== Related eclipses ==
=== Eclipses in 2075 ===
- A penumbral lunar eclipse on January 2.
- A total solar eclipse on January 16.
- A partial lunar eclipse on June 28.
- An annular solar eclipse on July 13.
- A partial lunar eclipse on December 22.

=== Metonic ===
- Preceded by: Lunar eclipse of September 9, 2071
- Followed by: Lunar eclipse of April 16, 2079

=== Tzolkinex ===
- Preceded by: Lunar eclipse of May 17, 2068
- Followed by: Lunar eclipse of August 8, 2082

=== Half-Saros ===
- Preceded by: Solar eclipse of June 22, 2066
- Followed by: Solar eclipse of July 3, 2084

=== Tritos ===
- Preceded by: Lunar eclipse of July 28, 2064
- Followed by: Lunar eclipse of May 28, 2086

=== Lunar Saros 121 ===
- Preceded by: Lunar eclipse of June 17, 2057
- Followed by: Lunar eclipse of July 8, 2093

=== Inex ===
- Preceded by: Lunar eclipse of July 18, 2046
- Followed by: Lunar eclipse of June 8, 2104

=== Triad ===
- Preceded by: Lunar eclipse of August 27, 1988
- Followed by: Lunar eclipse of April 29, 2162

=== Lunar eclipses of 2074–2078 ===
This eclipse is a member of a semester series. An eclipse in a semester series of lunar eclipses repeats approximately every 177 days and 4 hours (a semester) at alternating nodes of the Moon's orbit.

The penumbral lunar eclipses on February 11, 2074 and August 7, 2074 occur in the previous lunar year eclipse set, and the penumbral lunar eclipses on April 27, 2078 and October 21, 2078 occur in the next lunar year eclipse set.

Lunar eclipse series sets from 2074 to 2078
| Descending node | | | | Ascending node | | | |
| Saros | Date Viewing | Type Chart | Gamma | Saros | Date Viewing | Type Chart | Gamma |
| 111 | 2074 Jul 08 | Penumbral | 1.4456 | 116 | 2075 Jan 02 | Penumbral | −1.1642 |
| 121 | 2075 Jun 28 | Partial | 0.6897 | 126 | 2075 Dec 22 | Partial | −0.4945 |
| 131 | 2076 Jun 17 | Total | −0.0452 | 136 | 2076 Dec 10 | Total | 0.2102 |
| 141 | 2077 Jun 06 | Partial | −0.8387 | 146 | 2077 Nov 29 | Partial | 0.8854 |
| | | | | 156 | 2078 Nov 19 | Penumbral | 1.5147 |

=== Saros 121 ===
This eclipse is a part of Saros series 121, repeating every 18 years, 11 days, and containing 82 events. The series started with a penumbral lunar eclipse on October 6, 1047. It contains partial eclipses from May 10, 1408 through July 3, 1498; total eclipses from July 13, 1516 through May 26, 2021; and a second set of partial eclipses from June 6, 2039 through August 11, 2147. The series ends at member 82 as a penumbral eclipse on March 18, 2508.

The longest duration of totality was produced by member 43 at 100 minutes, 29 seconds on October 18, 1660. All eclipses in this series occur at the Moon’s descending node of orbit.

| Greatest | First | | | |
|---|---|---|---|---|
| The greatest eclipse of the series occurred on 1660 Oct 18, lasting 100 minutes, 29 seconds. | Penumbral | Partial | Total | Central |
| The greatest eclipse of the series occurred on 1660 Oct 18, lasting 100 minutes, 29 seconds. | 1047 Oct 06 | 1408 May 10 | 1516 Jul 13 | 1570 Aug 15 |
| The greatest eclipse of the series occurred on 1660 Oct 18, lasting 100 minutes, 29 seconds. | Last | | | |
| The greatest eclipse of the series occurred on 1660 Oct 18, lasting 100 minutes, 29 seconds. | Central | Total | Partial | Penumbral |
| The greatest eclipse of the series occurred on 1660 Oct 18, lasting 100 minutes, 29 seconds. | 1949 Apr 13 | 2021 May 26 | 2147 Aug 11 | 2508 Mar 18 |

Eclipses are tabulated in three columns; every third eclipse in the same column is one exeligmos apart, so they all cast shadows over approximately the same parts of the Earth.

Series members 43–64 occur between 1801 and 2200:
| 43 | 44 | 45 |
|---|---|---|
| 1805 Jan 15 | 1823 Jan 26 | 1841 Feb 06 |
| 46 | 47 | 48 |
| 1859 Feb 17 | 1877 Feb 27 | 1895 Mar 11 |
| 49 | 50 | 51 |
| 1913 Mar 22 | 1931 Apr 02 | 1949 Apr 13 |
| 52 | 53 | 54 |
| 1967 Apr 24 | 1985 May 04 | 2003 May 16 |
| 55 | 56 | 57 |
| 2021 May 26 | 2039 Jun 06 | 2057 Jun 17 |
| 58 | 59 | 60 |
| 2075 Jun 28 | 2093 Jul 08 | 2111 Jul 21 |
| 61 | 62 | 63 |
| 2129 Jul 31 | 2147 Aug 11 | 2165 Aug 21 |
64
2183 Sep 02

=== Tritos series ===
This eclipse is a part of a tritos cycle, repeating at alternating nodes every 135 synodic months (≈ 3986.63 days, or 11 years minus 1 month). Their appearance and longitude are irregular due to a lack of synchronization with the anomalistic month (period of perigee), but groupings of 3 tritos cycles (≈ 33 years minus 3 months) come close (≈ 434.044 anomalistic months), so eclipses are similar in these groupings.

Series members between 1835 and 2200
| 1835 May 12 (Saros 99) | 1846 Apr 11 (Saros 100) | | 1868 Feb 08 (Saros 102) | 1879 Jan 08 (Saros 103) |
| | | | | 1933 Aug 05 (Saros 108) |
| 1944 Jul 06 (Saros 109) | 1955 Jun 05 (Saros 110) | 1966 May 04 (Saros 111) | 1977 Apr 04 (Saros 112) | 1988 Mar 03 (Saros 113) |
| 1999 Jan 31 (Saros 114) | 2009 Dec 31 (Saros 115) | 2020 Nov 30 (Saros 116) | 2031 Oct 30 (Saros 117) | 2042 Sep 29 (Saros 118) |
| 2053 Aug 29 (Saros 119) | 2064 Jul 28 (Saros 120) | 2075 Jun 28 (Saros 121) | 2086 May 28 (Saros 122) | 2097 Apr 26 (Saros 123) |
| 2108 Mar 27 (Saros 124) | 2119 Feb 25 (Saros 125) | 2130 Jan 24 (Saros 126) | 2140 Dec 23 (Saros 127) | 2151 Nov 24 (Saros 128) |
| 2162 Oct 23 (Saros 129) | 2173 Sep 21 (Saros 130) | 2184 Aug 21 (Saros 131) | 2195 Jul 22 (Saros 132) | |

=== Half-Saros cycle ===
A lunar eclipse will be preceded and followed by solar eclipses by 9 years and 5.5 days (a half saros). This lunar eclipse is related to two total solar eclipses of Solar Saros 128.

| June 22, 2066 | July 3, 2084 |

== See also ==
- List of lunar eclipses and List of 21st-century lunar eclipses
