= May 2021 lunar eclipse =

Total lunar eclipse of 26 May 2021

- Total eclipse
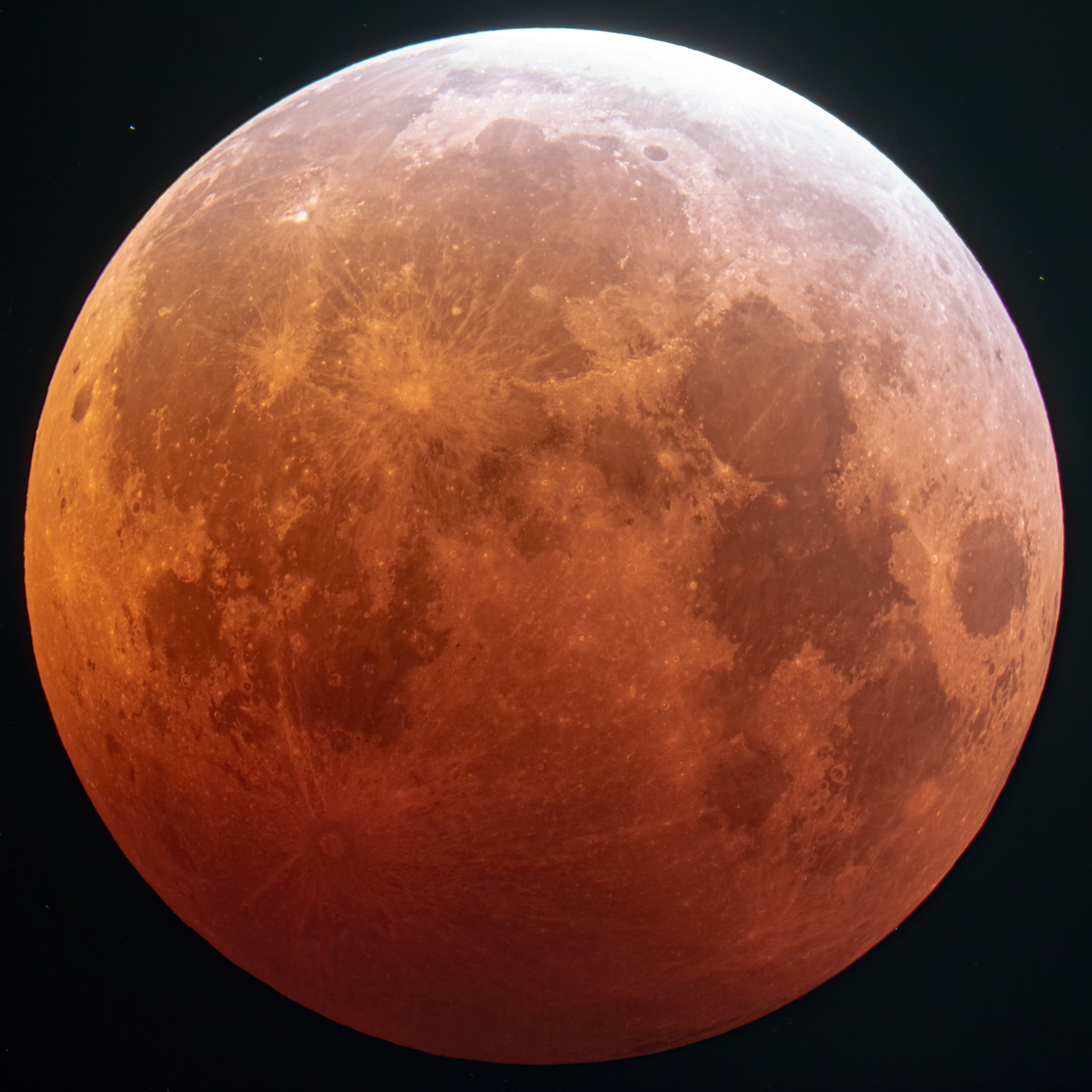
- Totality as viewed from Mountain View, California at 11:23 UTC, end of totality
- Date: May 26, 2021
- Gamma: 0.4774
- Magnitude: 1.0112
- Saros cycle: 121 (55 of 82)
- Totality: 15 minutes, 52 seconds
- Partiality: 188 minutes, 7 seconds
- Penumbral: 302 minutes, 50 seconds
Contacts (UTC)
- P1: 08:47:22
- U1: 09:44:44
- U2: 11:10:57
- Greatest: 11:18:44
- U3: 11:26:48
- U4: 12:52:51
- P4: 13:50:12

This animation shows the Moon moving west to east, passing into the shadow of Earth in Scorpius near the Milky Way. It first enters the outer penumbral shadow, and then the dark umbral shadow. Here, the brightness of the Moon is exaggerated within the umbral shadow. The southern part of the Moon is darkest due to it being closest to the centre of the shadow.

A total lunar eclipse occurred at the Moon’s descending node of orbit on Wednesday, May 26, 2021, with an umbral magnitude of 1.0112. A lunar eclipse occurs when the Moon moves into the Earth's shadow, causing the Moon to be darkened. A total lunar eclipse occurs when the Moon's near side entirely passes into the Earth's umbral shadow. Unlike a solar eclipse, which can only be viewed from a relatively small area of the world, a lunar eclipse may be viewed from anywhere on the night side of Earth. A total lunar eclipse can last up to nearly two hours, while a total solar eclipse lasts only a few minutes at any given place, because the Moon's shadow is smaller. Occurring about 0.4 days after perigee (01:52 UTC, May 26), the Moon's apparent diameter was larger than average.

It was the first total lunar eclipse since the January 2019 lunar eclipse, and the first in a series of an almost tetrad (with four consecutive total or deep partial lunar eclipses). The next total eclipse occurred in May 2022. The event took place near lunar perigee; as a result, this supermoon was referred to in US media coverage as a "super flower blood moon", (Note: A full moon occurring in May has been termed a "Flower moon" in the US as recorded in the Old Farmer's Almanac.) and elsewhere as a "super blood moon".

This lunar eclipse was the first of an almost tetrad, with the others being on November 19, 2021 (partial); May 16, 2022 (total); and November 8, 2022 (total).

== Visibility ==
The eclipse was completely visible over Australia and the central Pacific Ocean, seen rising over south and east Asia and setting over North and South America.

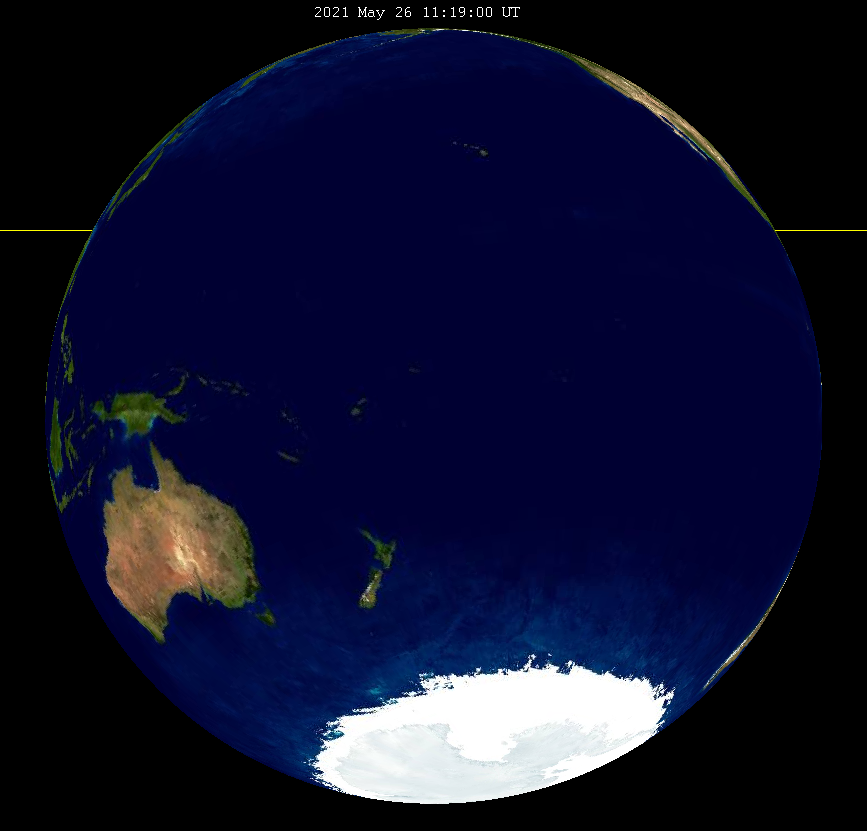
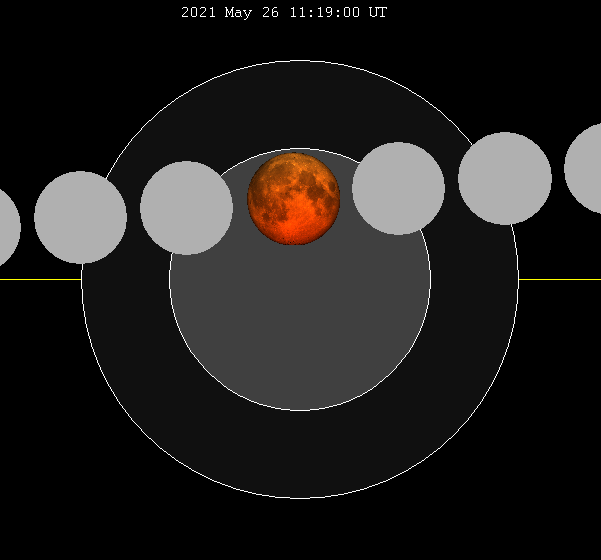
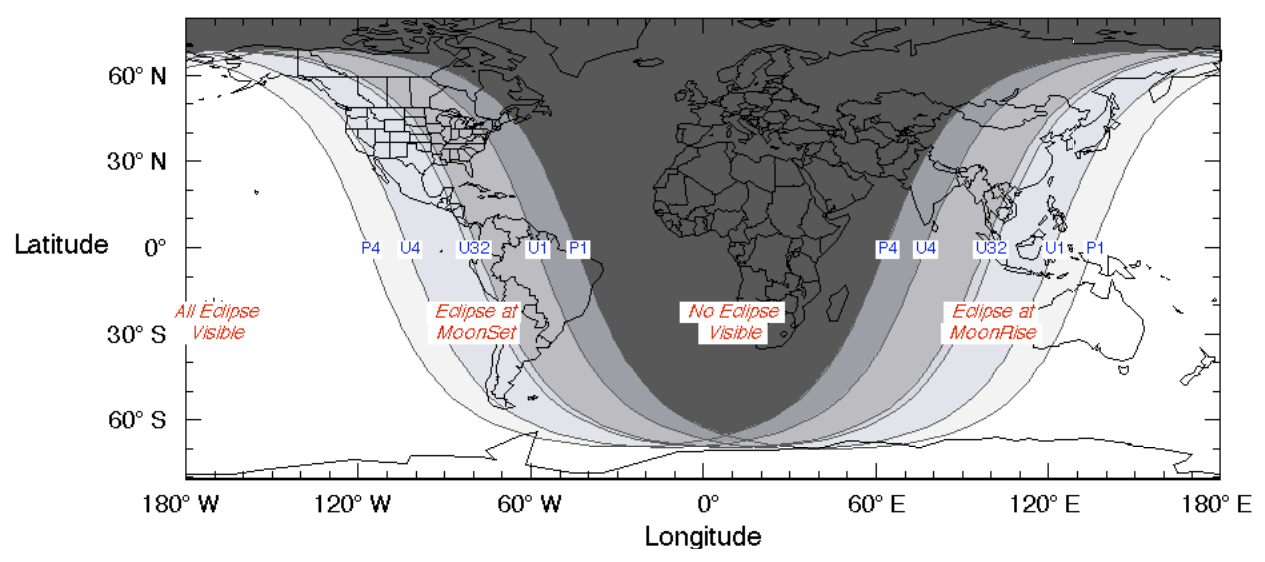
Visibility map

== Timing ==
Local times are recomputed here for the time zones of the areas where the eclipse was visible:

Local times of contacts
| Time Zone adjustments from UTC | | +8_{h} | +10_{h} | +12_{h} | -10_{h} | -8_{h} | -7_{h} | -6_{h} | -5_{h} | -4_{h} |
| Time Zone adjustments from UTC | | AWST | AEST | NZST | HST | AKDT | PDT | MDT | CDT | EDT |
|---|---|---|---|---|---|---|---|---|---|---|
| Event | | Evening 26 May / Morning 27 May | | | | Morning 26 May | | | | |
| P1 | Penumbral began | 4:48 pm | 6:48 pm | 8:48 pm | 10:48 pm | 12:48 am | 1:48 am | 2:48 am | 3:48 am | 4:48 am |
| U1 | Partial began | 5:45 pm | 7:45 pm | 9:45 pm | 11:45 pm | 1:45 am | 2:45 am | 3:45 am | 4:45 am | 5:16 am |
| U2 | Total began | 7:11 pm | 9:11 pm | 11:11 pm | 1:11 am | 3:11 am | 4:11 am | 5:11 am | 6:11 am | Set |
| | Greatest eclipse | 7:19 pm | 9:19 pm | 11:19 pm | 1:19 am | 3:19 am | 4:19 am | 5:19 am | 6:19 am | Set |
| U3 | Total ended | 7:26 pm | 9:26 pm | 11:26 pm | 1:26 am | 3:26 am | 4:26 am | 5:26 am | Set | Set |
| U4 | Partial ended | 8:52 pm | 10:52 pm | 12:52 am | 2:52 am | 4:52 am | Set | Set | Set | Set |
| P4 | Penumbral ended | 9:50 pm | 11:50 pm | 1:50 am | 3:50 am | 5:50 am | Set | Set | Set | Set |

Contact points relative to the Earth's umbral and penumbral shadows, here with the Moon near its descending node.

The timing of total lunar eclipses are determined by its contacts:
- P1 (First contact): Beginning of the penumbral eclipse. Earth's penumbra touches the Moon's outer limb.
- U1 (Second contact): Beginning of the partial eclipse. Earth's umbra touches the Moon's outer limb.
- U2 (Third contact): Beginning of the total eclipse. The Moon's surface is entirely within Earth's umbra.
- Greatest eclipse: The peak stage of the total eclipse. The Moon is at its closest to the center of Earth's umbra.
- U3 (Fourth contact): End of the total eclipse. The Moon's outer limb exits Earth's umbra.
- U4 (Fifth contact): End of the partial eclipse. Earth's umbra leaves the Moon's surface.
- P4 (Sixth contact): End of the penumbral eclipse. Earth's penumbra no longer makes contact with the Moon.

== Gallery ==
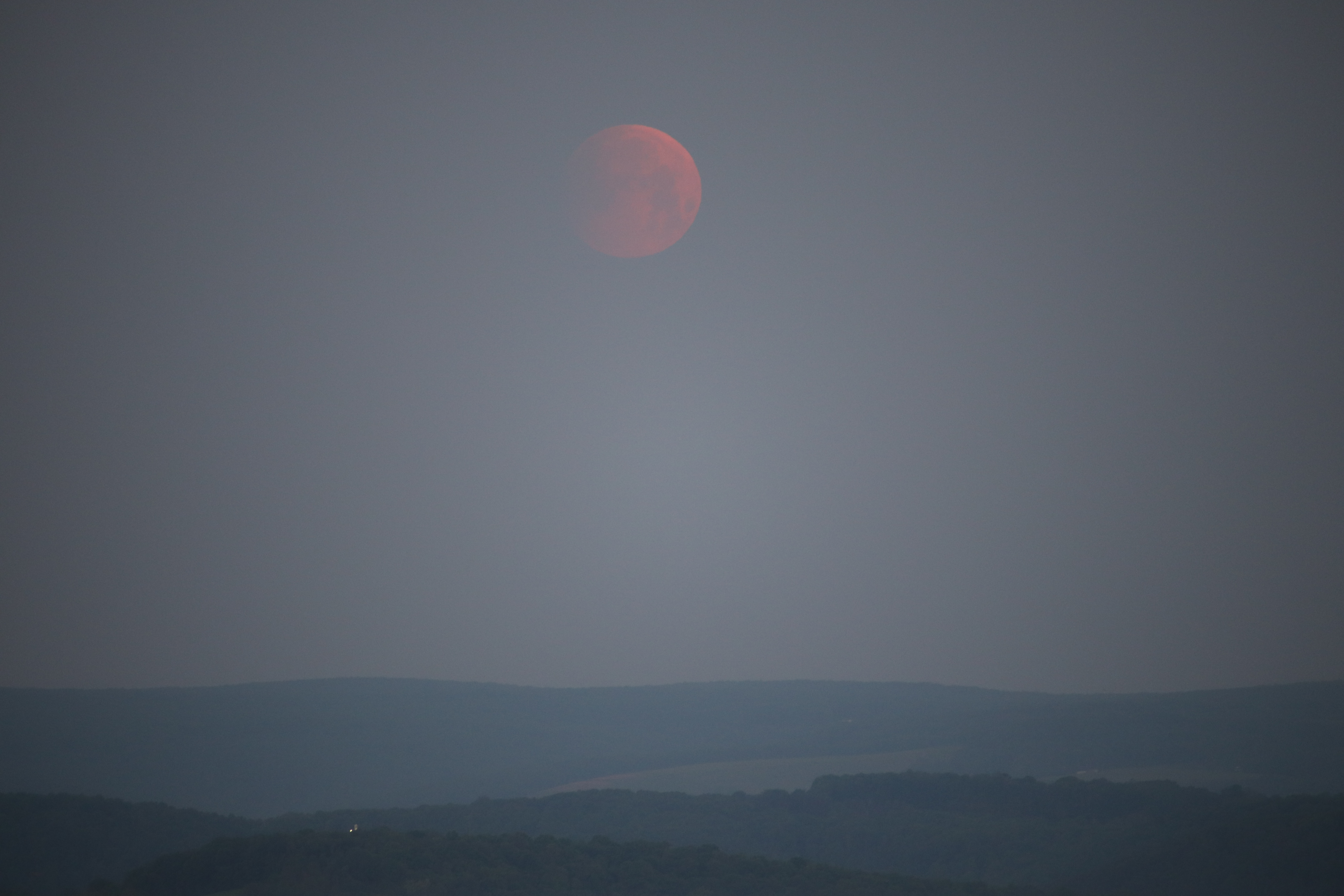
Keysers Ridge, Maryland, 9:43 UTC

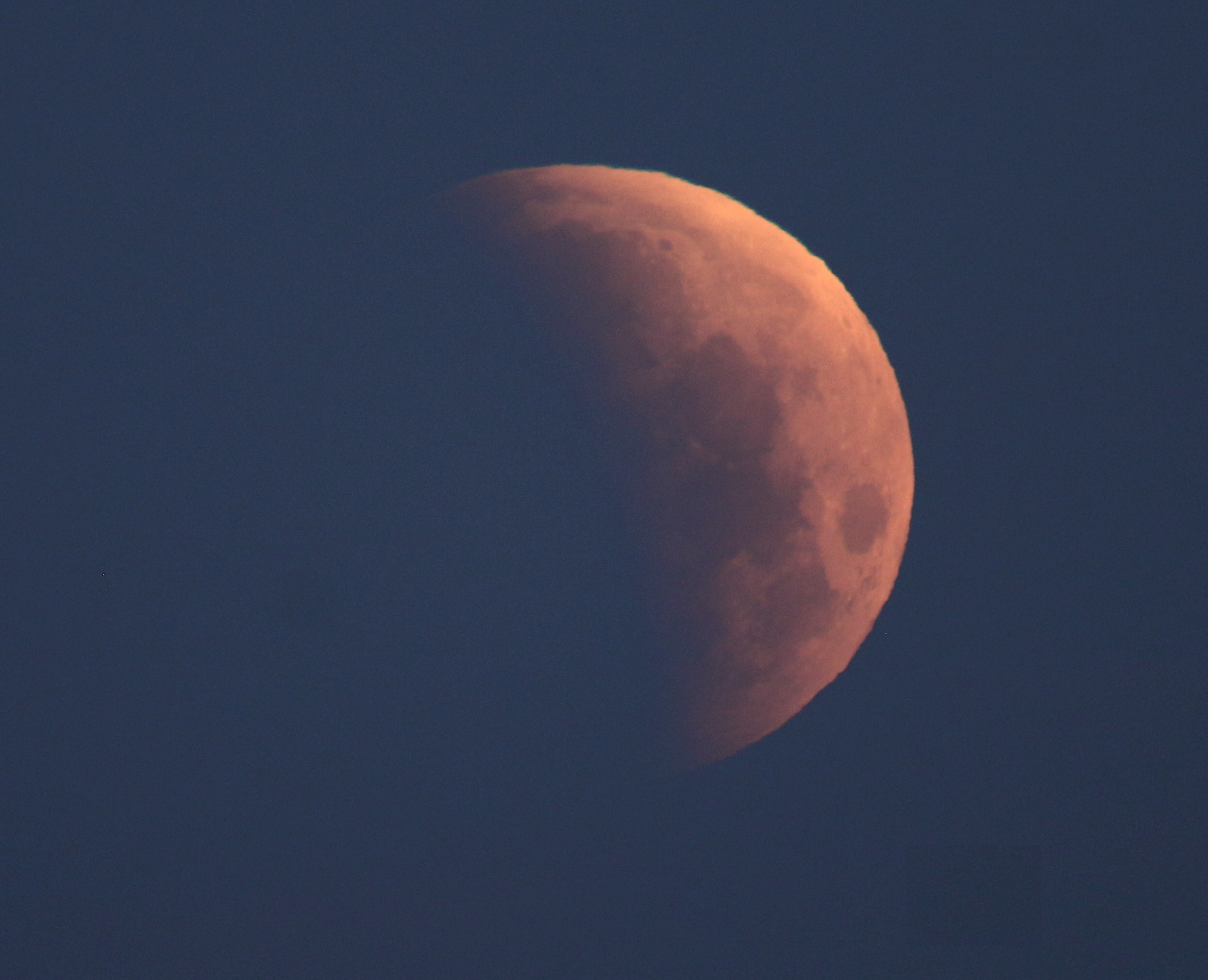
Minneapolis, Minnesota, 10:19 UTC

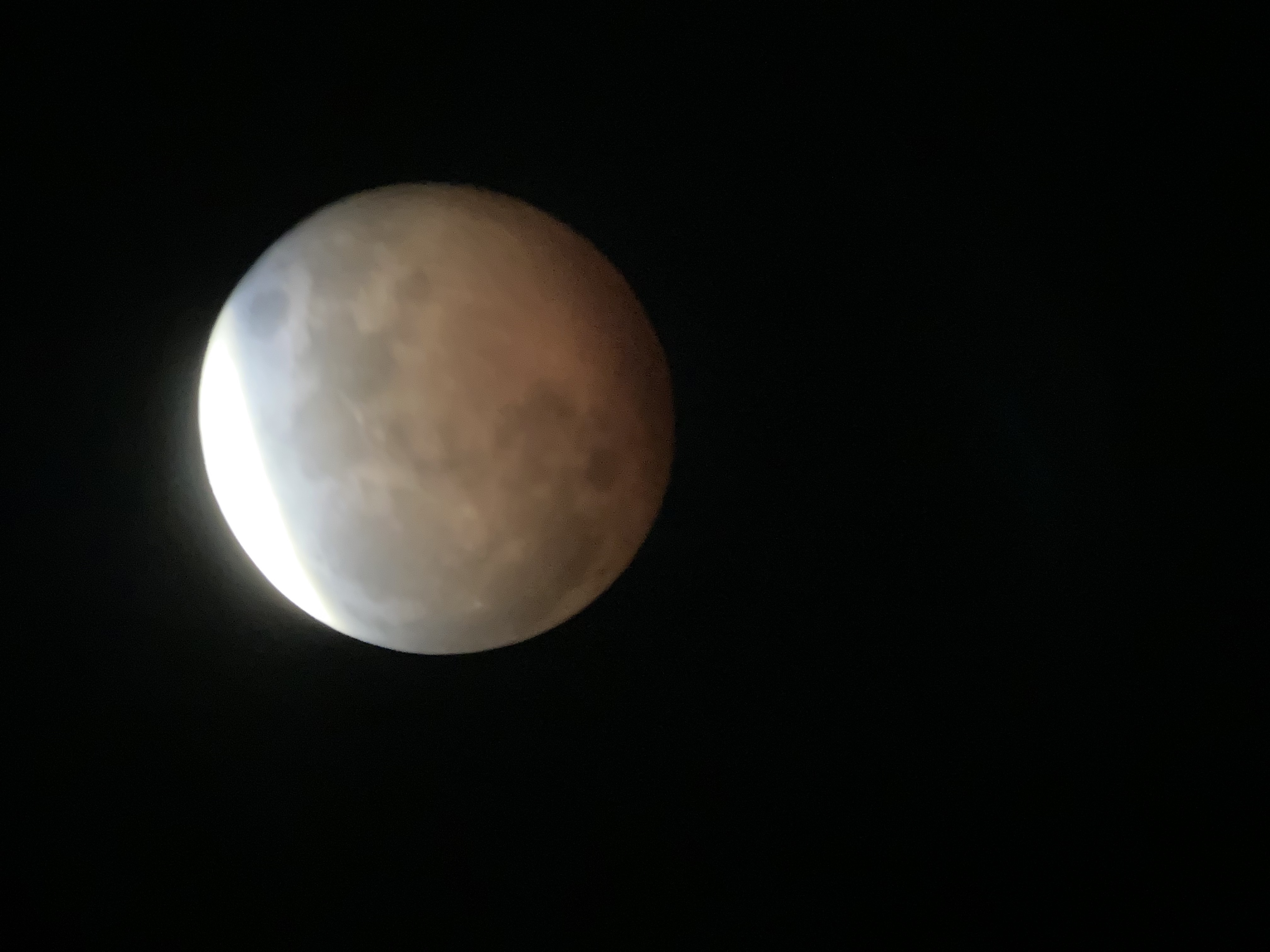
Berwick Forest, New Zealand, 10:52 UTC

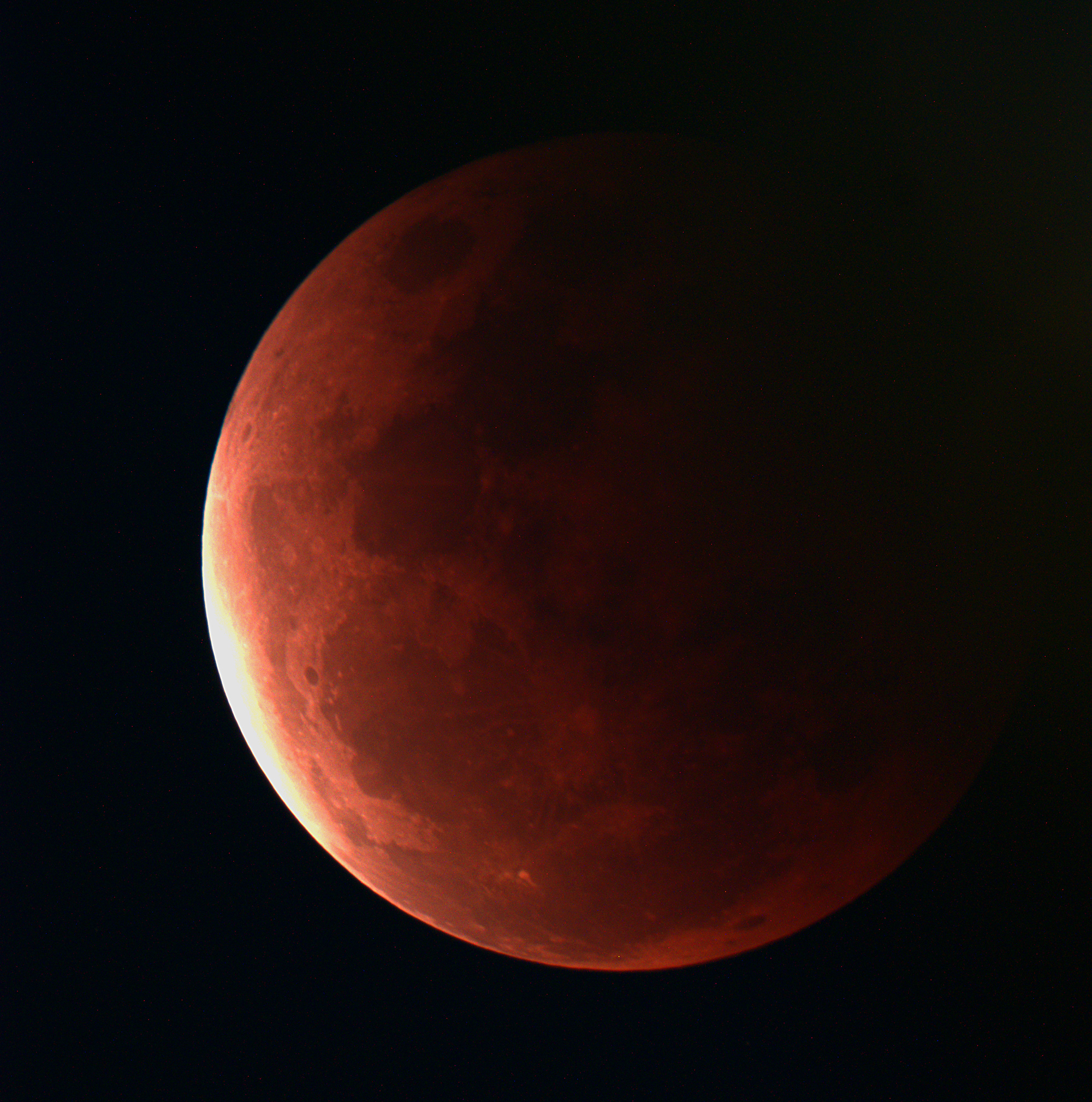
Taoyuan, Taiwan, 11:02 UTC

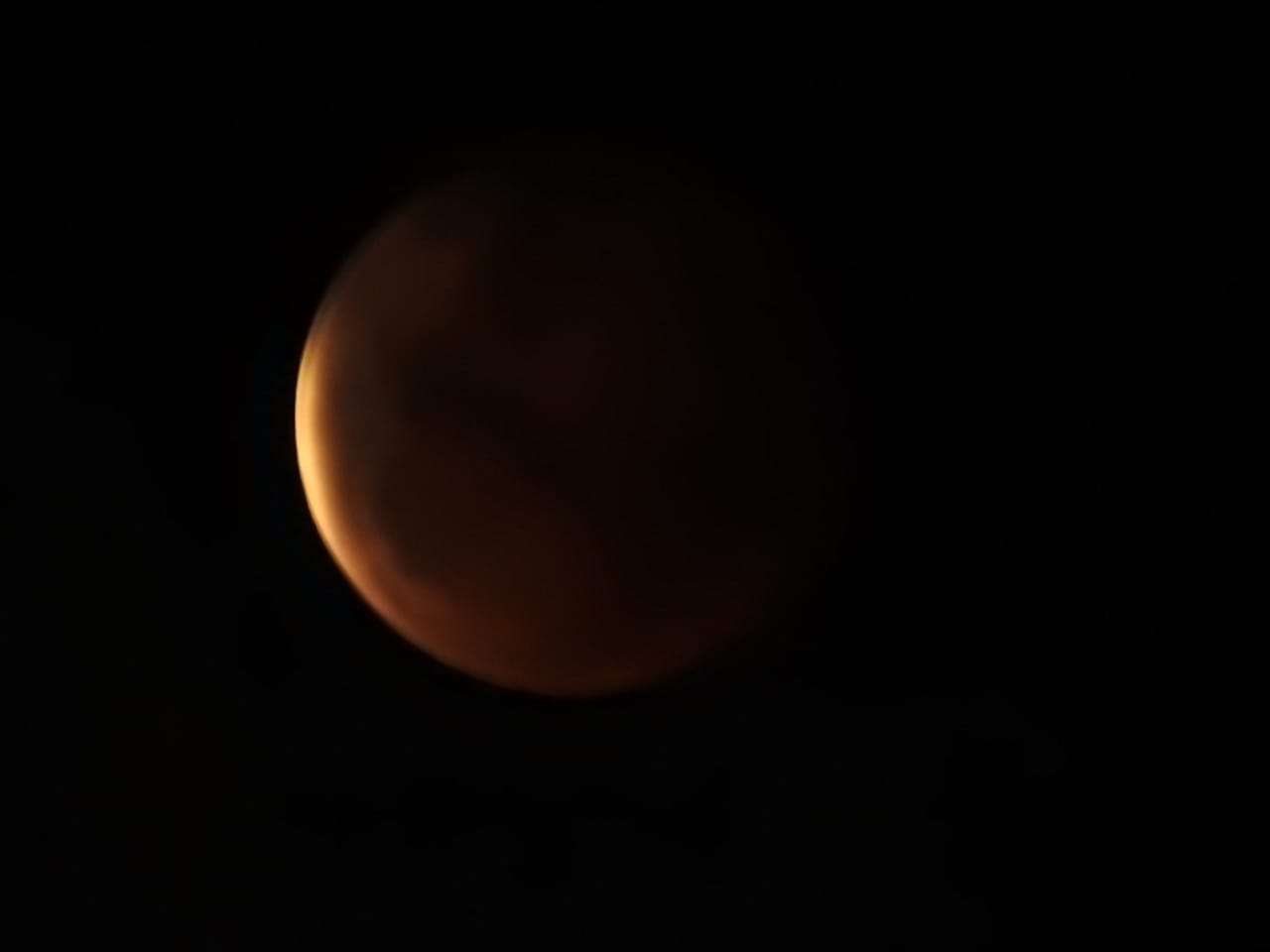
Banyuwangi, Indonesia, 11:03 UTC

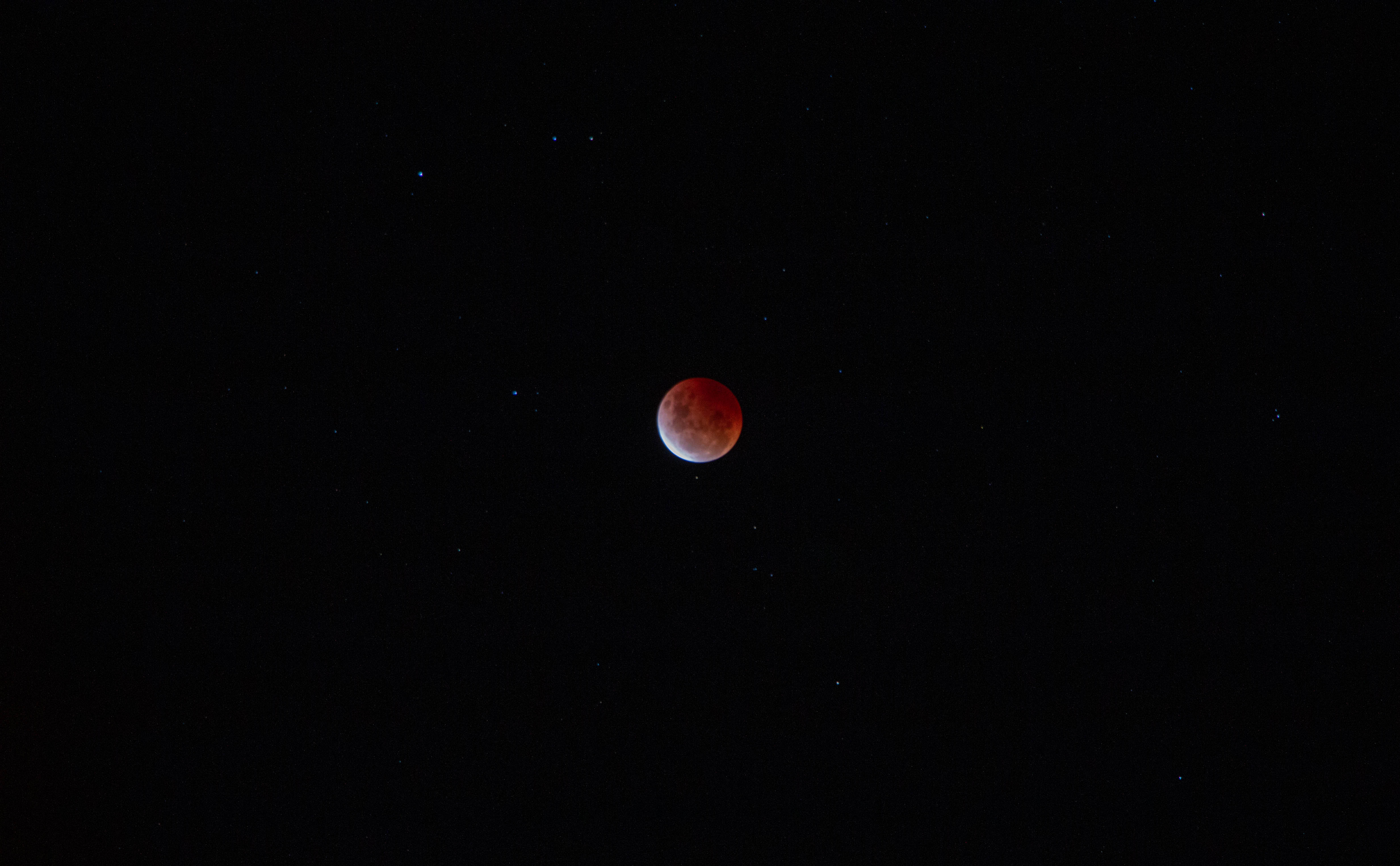
Canberra, Australia, 11:11 UTC

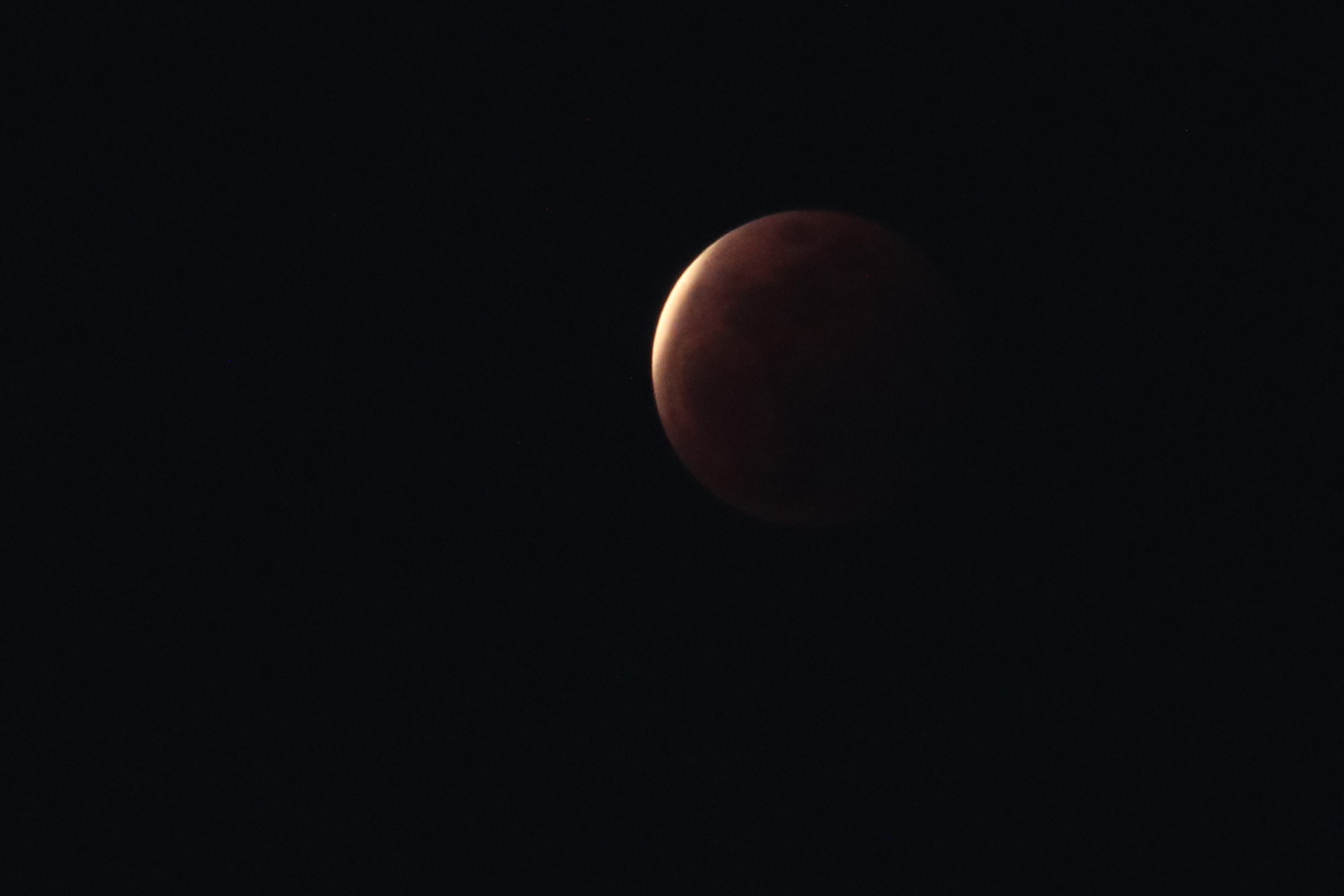
Manila, Philippines, 11:13 UTC

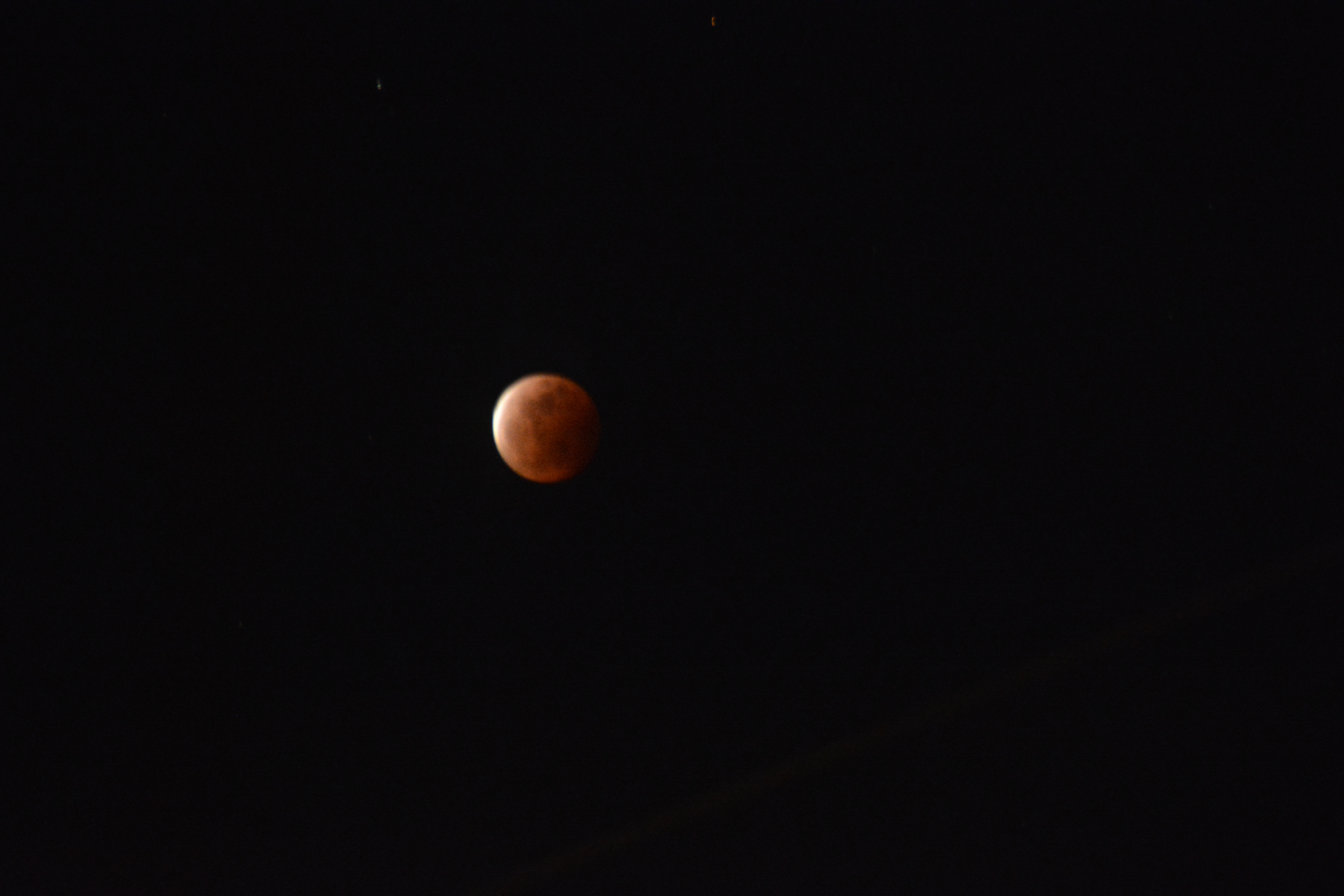
Laguna, Philippines, 11:15 UTC

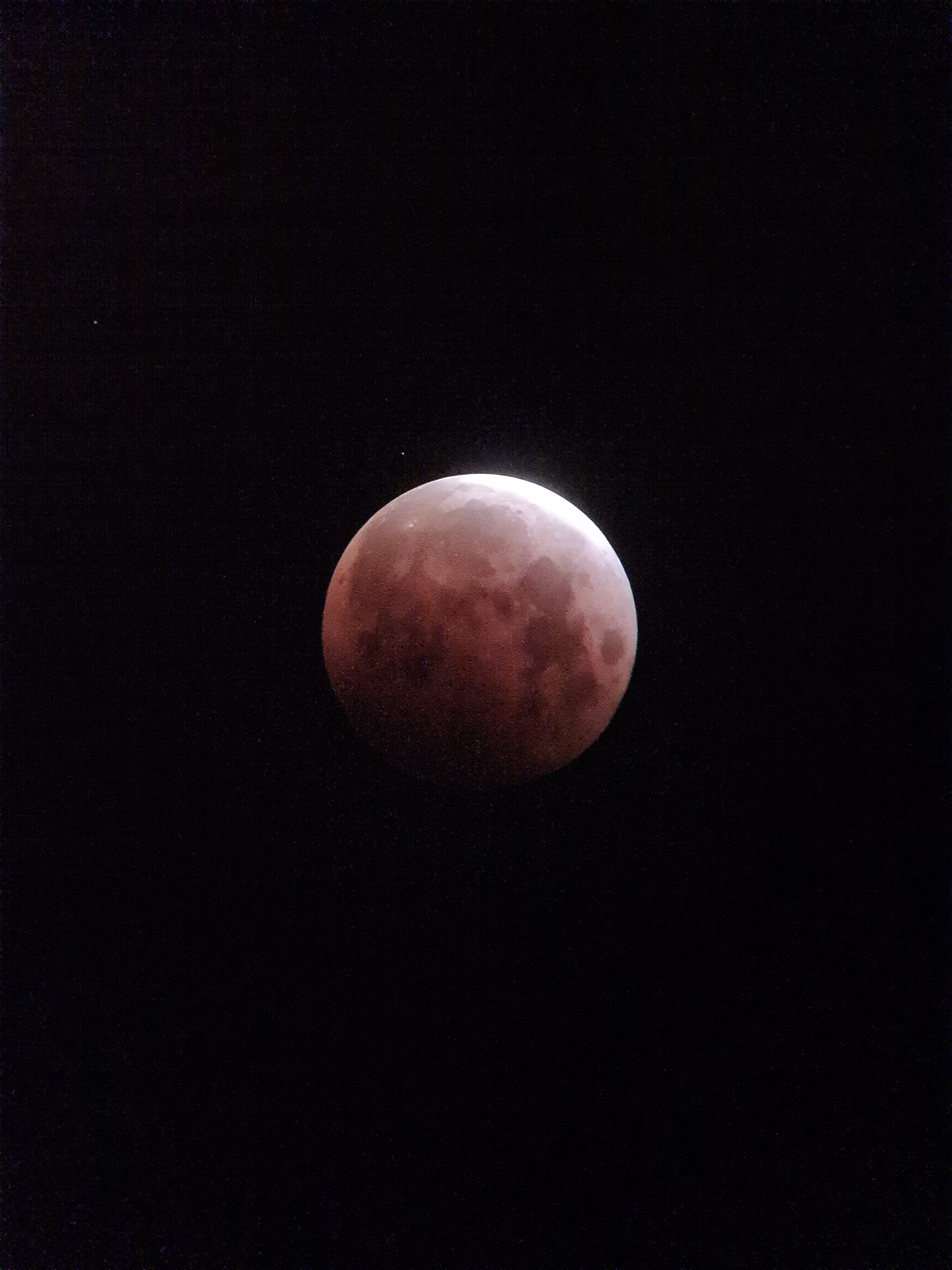
Melbourne, Australia, 11:16 UTC

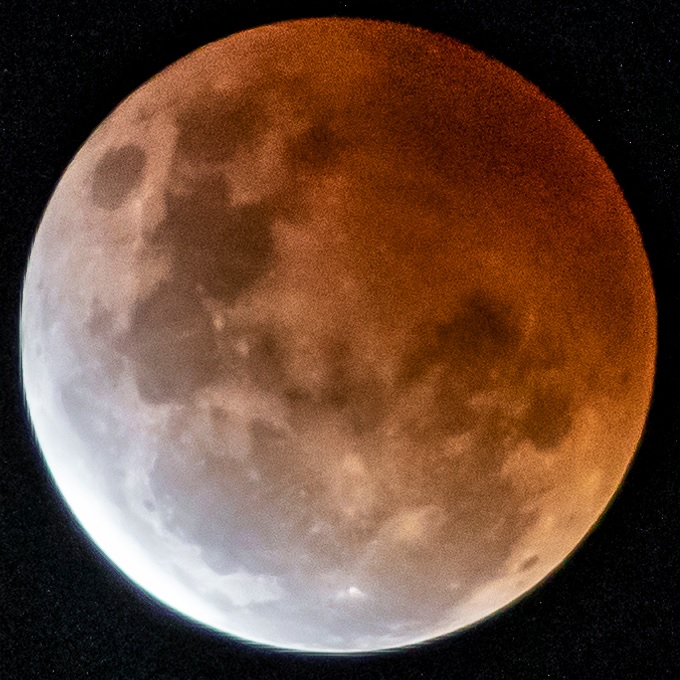
Geelong, Victoria, 11:23 UTC

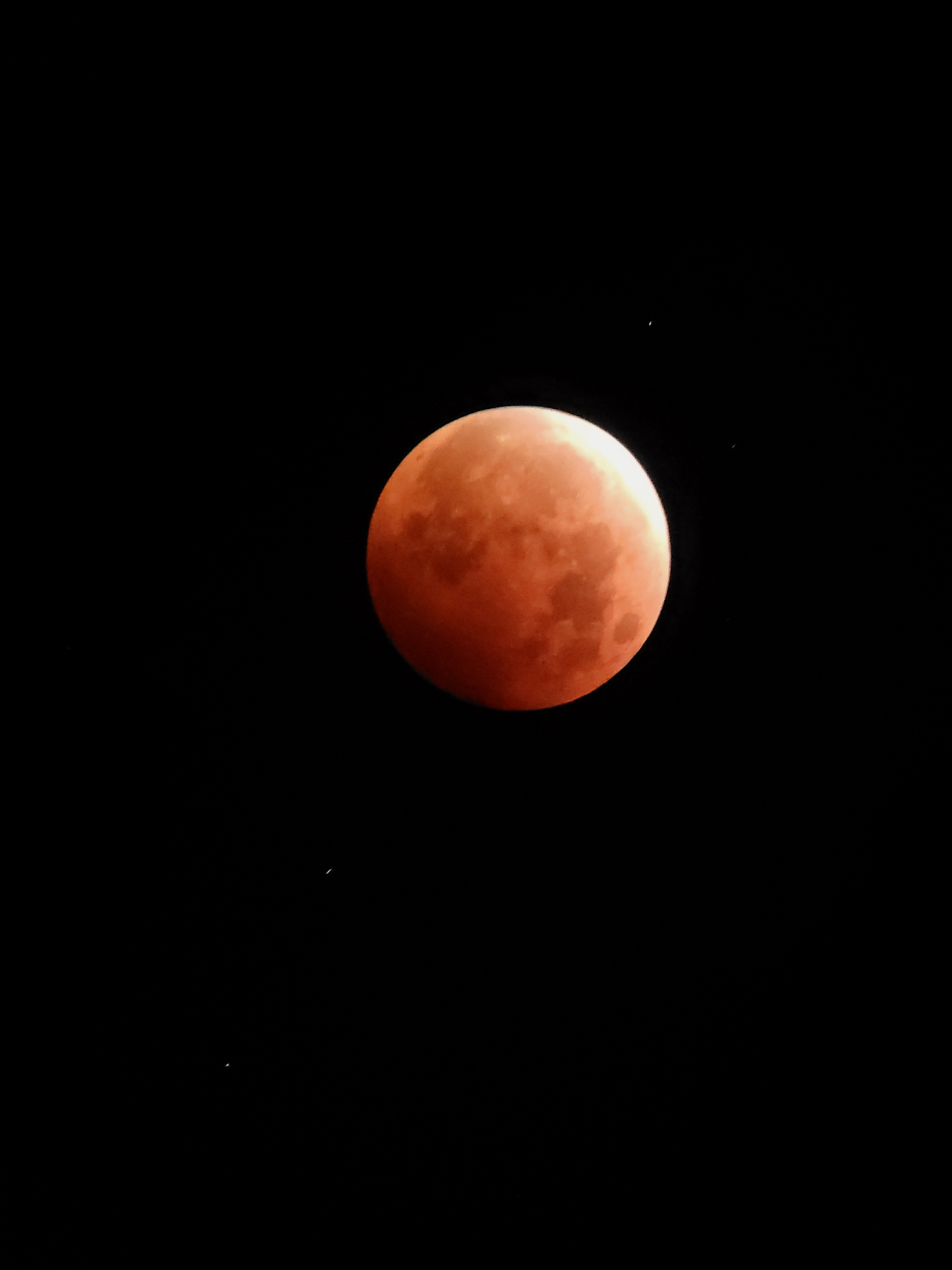
Brisbane, Australia, 11:24 UTC

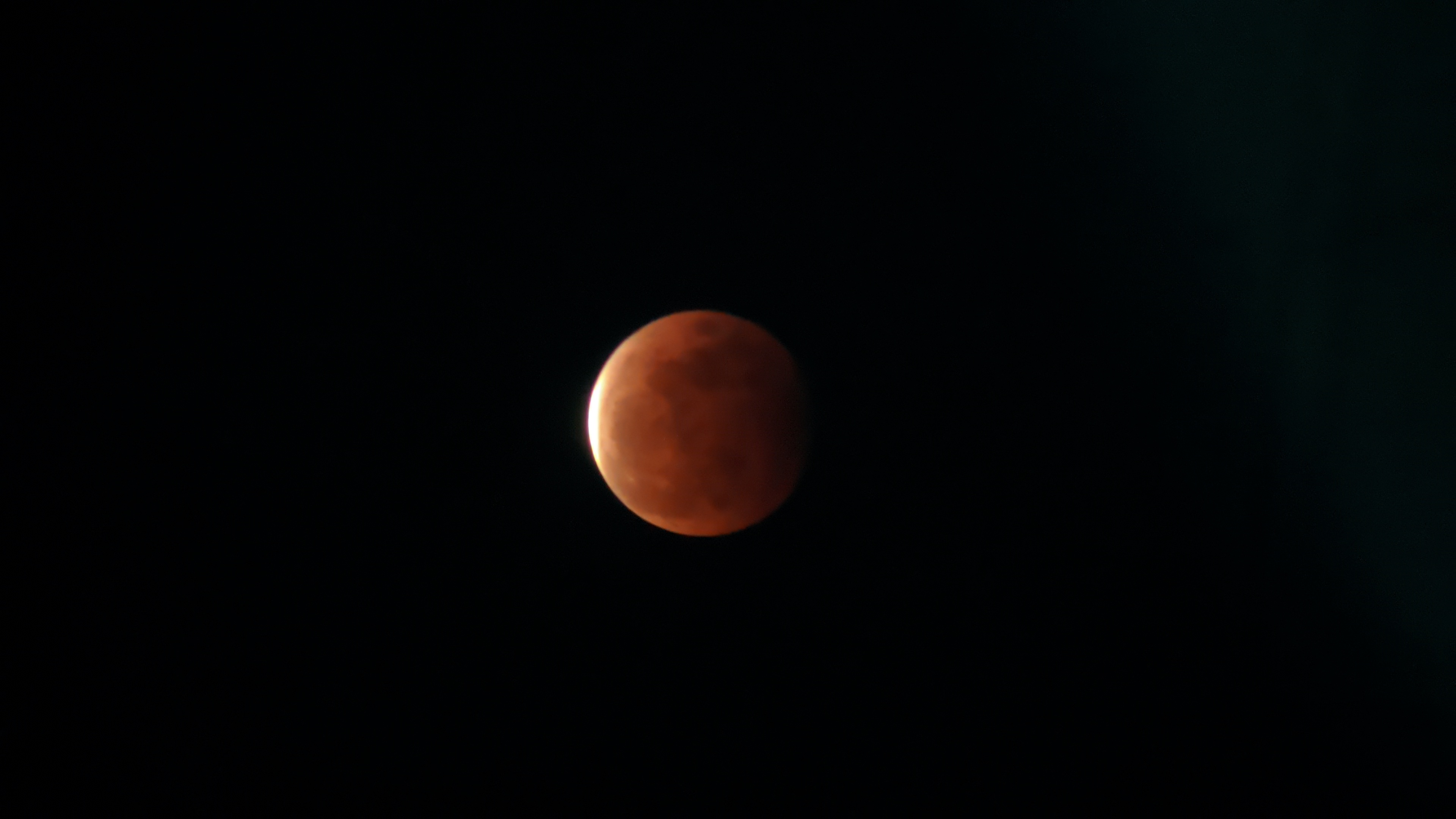
Tarlac City, Philippines, 11:32 UTC

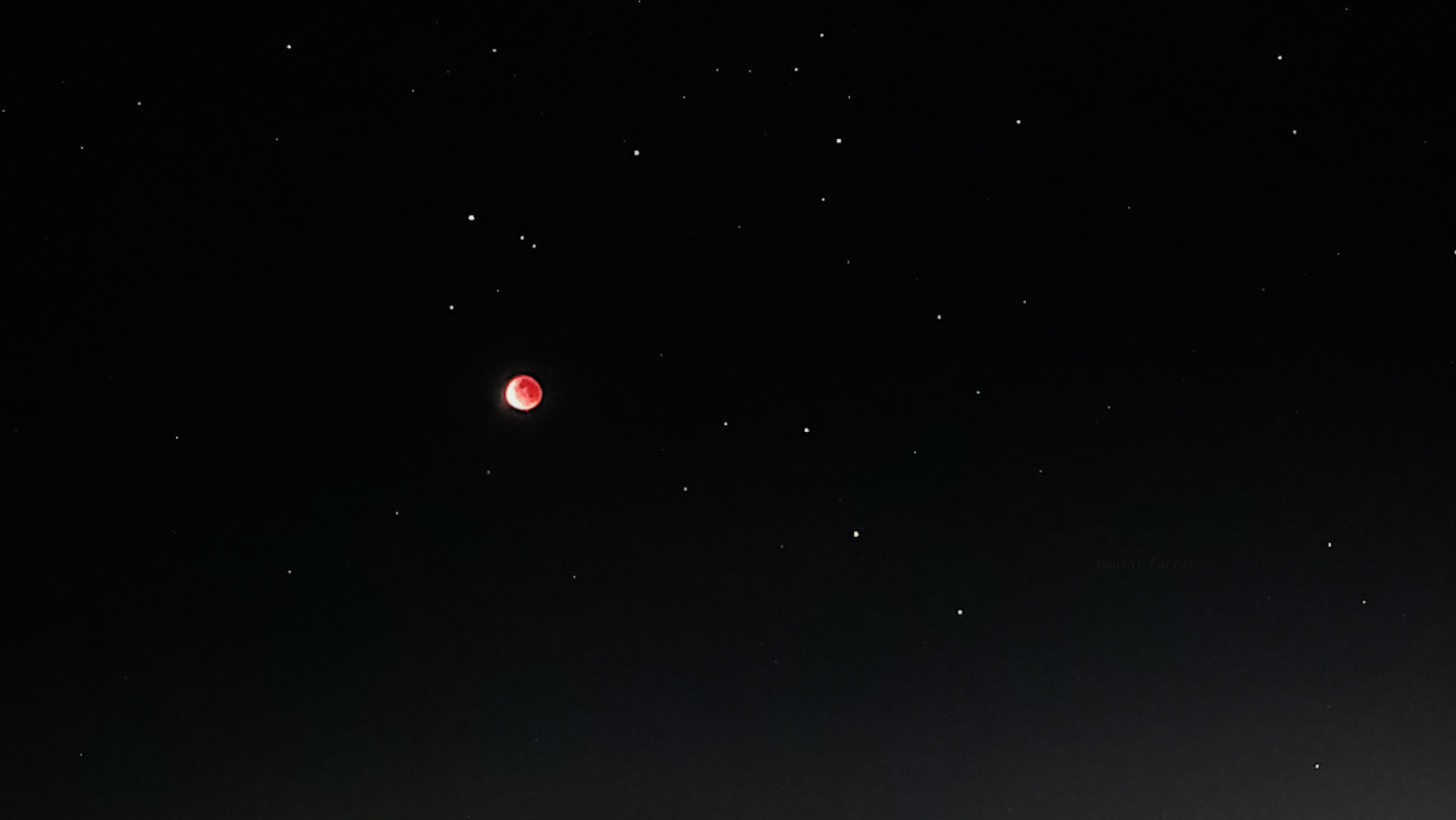
Kediri, Indonesia, 11:32 UTC

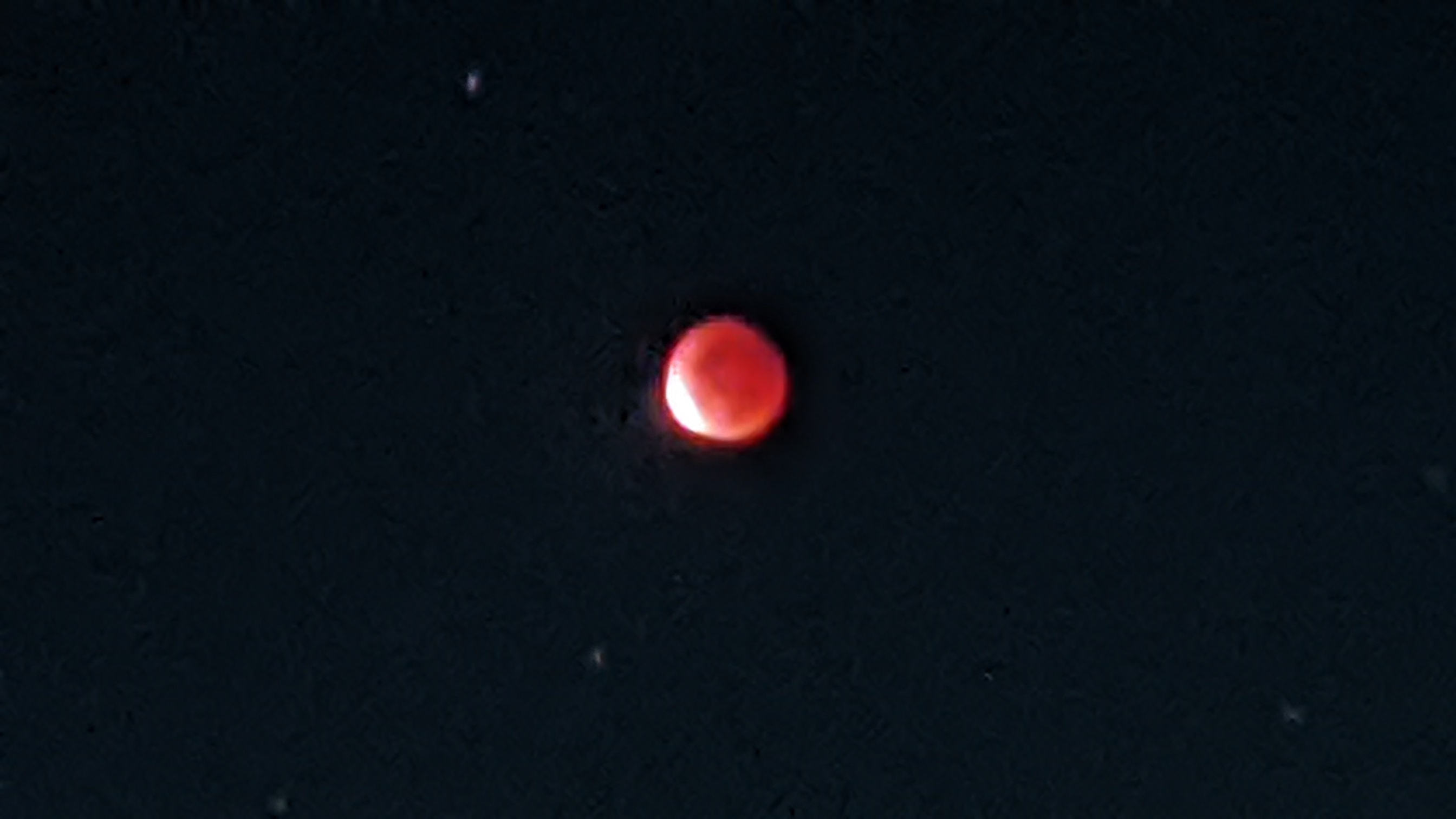
Magetan, Indonesia, 11:34 UTC

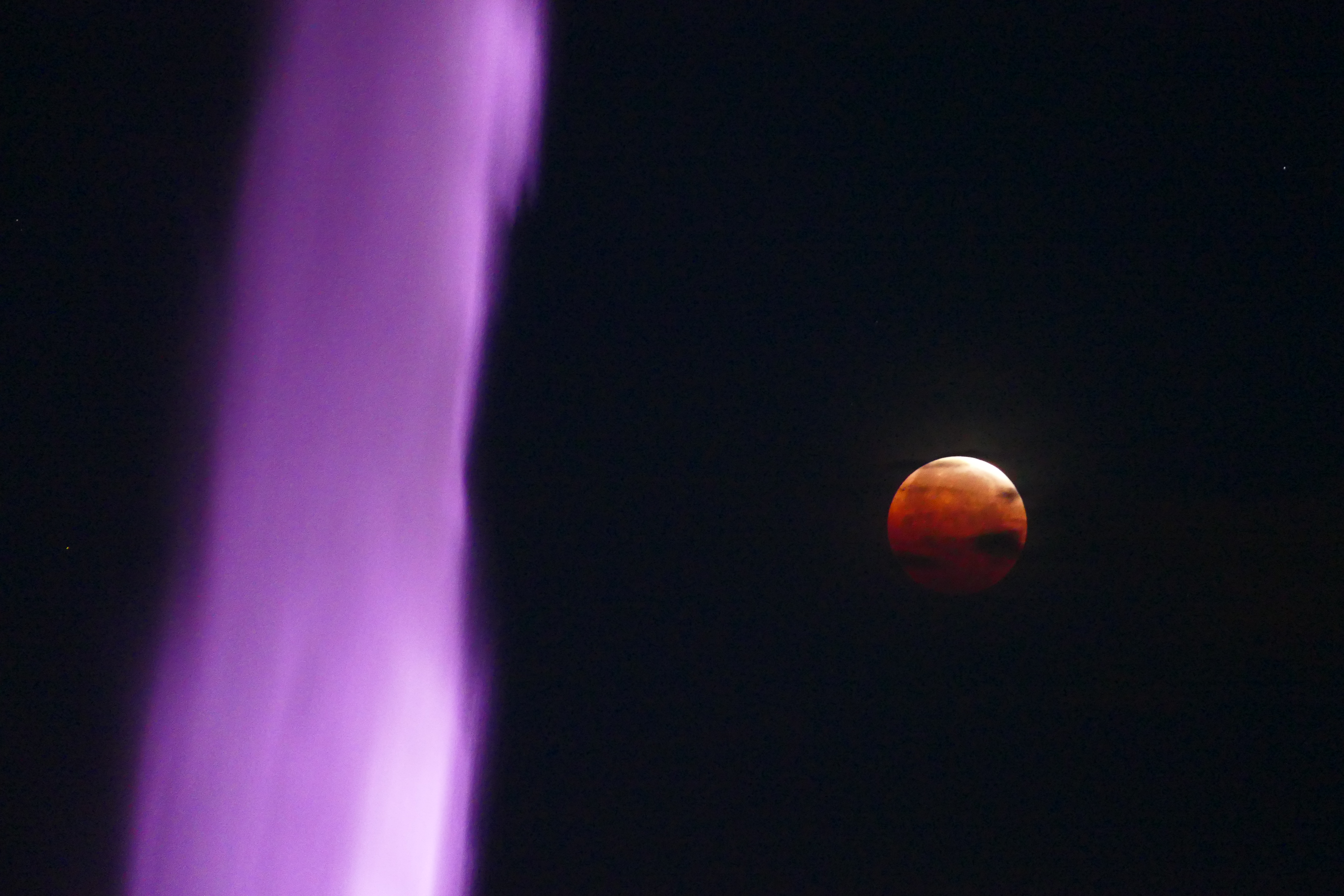
Fountain Hills, Arizona, 11:36 UTC

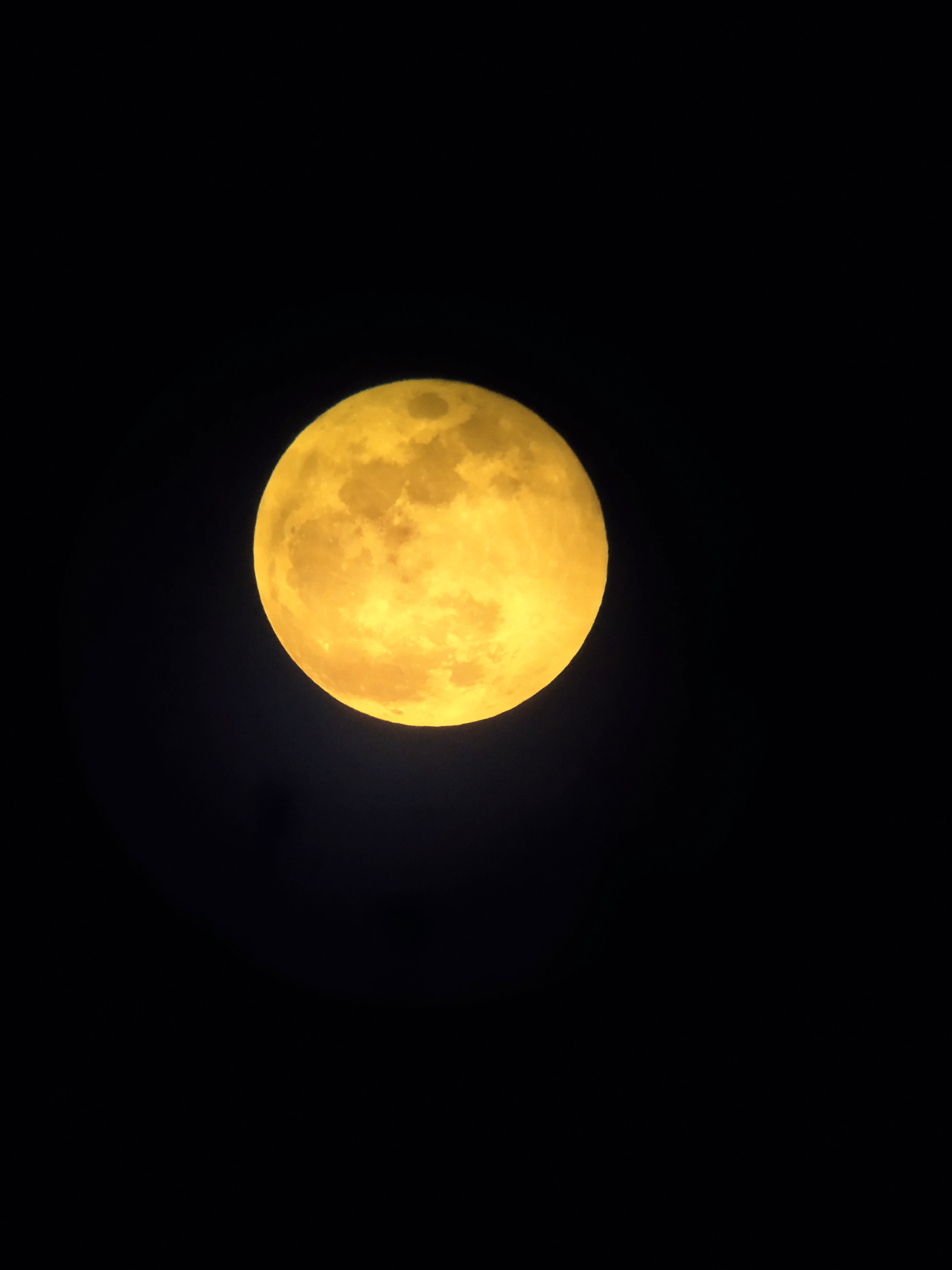
Chennai, India, 13:27 UTC

Eclipse progression from Dulcot, Tasmania

== Eclipse details ==
Shown below is a table displaying details about this particular lunar eclipse. It describes various parameters pertaining to this eclipse.

May 26, 2021 Lunar Eclipse Parameters
| Parameter | Value |
|---|---|
| Penumbral Magnitude | 1.95575 |
| Umbral Magnitude | 1.01120 |
| Gamma | 0.47741 |
| Sun Right Ascension | 04^{h} 14^{m} 03.6^{s} |
| Sun Declination | +21° 12′ 25.4″ |
| Sun Semi-Diameter | 15′ 47.3″ |
| Sun Equatorial Horizontal Parallax | 08.7″ |
| Moon Right Ascension | 16^{h} 14^{m} 37.8^{s} |
| Moon Declination | −20° 44′ 15.0″ |
| Moon Semi-Diameter | 16′ 42.9″ |
| Moon Equatorial Horizontal Parallax | 1° 01′ 20.5″ |
| ΔT | 69.4 s |

== Eclipse season ==
This eclipse is part of an eclipse season, a period, roughly every six months, when eclipses occur. Only two (or occasionally three) eclipse seasons occur each year, and each season lasts about 35 days and repeats just short of six months (173 days) later; thus two full eclipse seasons always occur each year. Either two or three eclipses happen each eclipse season. In the sequence below, each eclipse is separated by a fortnight.

Eclipse season of May–June 2021
| May 26 Descending node (full moon) | June 10 Ascending node (new moon) |
|---|---|
| Total lunar eclipse Lunar Saros 121 | Annular solar eclipse Solar Saros 147 |

== Related eclipses ==
=== Eclipses in 2021 ===
- A total lunar eclipse on May 26.
- An annular solar eclipse on June 10.
- A partial lunar eclipse on November 19.
- A total solar eclipse on December 4.

=== Metonic ===
- Preceded by: Lunar eclipse of August 7, 2017
- Followed by: Lunar eclipse of March 14, 2025

=== Tzolkinex ===
- Preceded by: Lunar eclipse of April 15, 2014
- Followed by: Lunar eclipse of July 6, 2028

=== Half-Saros ===
- Preceded by: Solar eclipse of May 20, 2012
- Followed by: Solar eclipse of June 1, 2030

=== Tritos ===
- Preceded by: Lunar eclipse of June 26, 2010
- Followed by: Lunar eclipse of April 25, 2032

=== Lunar Saros 121 ===
- Preceded by: Lunar eclipse of May 16, 2003
- Followed by: Lunar eclipse of June 6, 2039

=== Inex ===
- Preceded by: Lunar eclipse of June 15, 1992
- Followed by: Lunar eclipse of May 6, 2050

=== Triad ===
- Preceded by: Lunar eclipse of July 26, 1934
- Followed by: Lunar eclipse of March 27, 2108

=== Lunar eclipses of 2020–2023 ===
This eclipse is a member of a semester series. An eclipse in a semester series of lunar eclipses repeats approximately every 177 days and 4 hours (a semester) at alternating nodes of the Moon's orbit.

The penumbral lunar eclipses on January 10, 2020 and July 5, 2020 occur in the previous lunar year eclipse set.

Lunar eclipse series sets from 2020 to 2023
| Descending node | | | | Ascending node | | | |
| Saros | Date Viewing | Type Chart | Gamma | Saros | Date Viewing | Type Chart | Gamma |
| 111 | 2020 Jun 05 | Penumbral | 1.2406 | 116 | 2020 Nov 30 | Penumbral | −1.1309 |
| 121 | 2021 May 26 | Total | 0.4774 | 126 | 2021 Nov 19 | Partial | −0.4553 |
| 131 | 2022 May 16 | Total | −0.2532 | 136 | 2022 Nov 08 | Total | 0.2570 |
| 141 | 2023 May 05 | Penumbral | −1.0350 | 146 | 2023 Oct 28 | Partial | 0.9472 |

=== Saros 121 ===
This eclipse is a part of Saros series 121, repeating every 18 years, 11 days, and containing 82 events. The series started with a penumbral lunar eclipse on October 6, 1047. It contains partial eclipses from May 10, 1408 through July 3, 1498; total eclipses from July 13, 1516 through May 26, 2021; and a second set of partial eclipses from June 6, 2039 through August 11, 2147. The series ends at member 82 as a penumbral eclipse on March 18, 2508.

The longest duration of totality was produced by member 43 at 100 minutes, 29 seconds on October 18, 1660. All eclipses in this series occur at the Moon’s descending node of orbit.

| Greatest | First | | | |
|---|---|---|---|---|
| The greatest eclipse of the series occurred on 1660 Oct 18, lasting 100 minutes, 29 seconds. | Penumbral | Partial | Total | Central |
| The greatest eclipse of the series occurred on 1660 Oct 18, lasting 100 minutes, 29 seconds. | 1047 Oct 06 | 1408 May 10 | 1516 Jul 13 | 1570 Aug 15 |
| The greatest eclipse of the series occurred on 1660 Oct 18, lasting 100 minutes, 29 seconds. | Last | | | |
| The greatest eclipse of the series occurred on 1660 Oct 18, lasting 100 minutes, 29 seconds. | Central | Total | Partial | Penumbral |
| The greatest eclipse of the series occurred on 1660 Oct 18, lasting 100 minutes, 29 seconds. | 1949 Apr 13 | 2021 May 26 | 2147 Aug 11 | 2508 Mar 18 |

Eclipses are tabulated in three columns; every third eclipse in the same column is one exeligmos apart, so they all cast shadows over approximately the same parts of the Earth.

Series members 43–64 occur between 1801 and 2200:
| 43 | 44 | 45 |
|---|---|---|
| 1805 Jan 15 | 1823 Jan 26 | 1841 Feb 06 |
| 46 | 47 | 48 |
| 1859 Feb 17 | 1877 Feb 27 | 1895 Mar 11 |
| 49 | 50 | 51 |
| 1913 Mar 22 | 1931 Apr 02 | 1949 Apr 13 |
| 52 | 53 | 54 |
| 1967 Apr 24 | 1985 May 04 | 2003 May 16 |
| 55 | 56 | 57 |
| 2021 May 26 | 2039 Jun 06 | 2057 Jun 17 |
| 58 | 59 | 60 |
| 2075 Jun 28 | 2093 Jul 08 | 2111 Jul 21 |
| 61 | 62 | 63 |
| 2129 Jul 31 | 2147 Aug 11 | 2165 Aug 21 |
64
2183 Sep 02

=== Tritos series ===
This eclipse is a part of a tritos cycle, repeating at alternating nodes every 135 synodic months (≈ 3986.63 days, or 11 years minus 1 month). Their appearance and longitude are irregular due to a lack of synchronization with the anomalistic month (period of perigee), but groupings of 3 tritos cycles (≈ 33 years minus 3 months) come close (≈ 434.044 anomalistic months), so eclipses are similar in these groupings.

Series members between 1801 and 2200
| 1803 Feb 06 (Saros 101) | 1814 Jan 06 (Saros 102) | 1824 Dec 06 (Saros 103) | | 1846 Oct 04 (Saros 105) |
| 1857 Sep 04 (Saros 106) | 1868 Aug 03 (Saros 107) | 1879 Jul 03 (Saros 108) | 1890 Jun 03 (Saros 109) | 1901 May 03 (Saros 110) |
| 1912 Apr 01 (Saros 111) | 1923 Mar 03 (Saros 112) | 1934 Jan 30 (Saros 113) | 1944 Dec 29 (Saros 114) | 1955 Nov 29 (Saros 115) |
| 1966 Oct 29 (Saros 116) | 1977 Sep 27 (Saros 117) | 1988 Aug 27 (Saros 118) | 1999 Jul 28 (Saros 119) | 2010 Jun 26 (Saros 120) |
| 2021 May 26 (Saros 121) | 2032 Apr 25 (Saros 122) | 2043 Mar 25 (Saros 123) | 2054 Feb 22 (Saros 124) | 2065 Jan 22 (Saros 125) |
| 2075 Dec 22 (Saros 126) | 2086 Nov 20 (Saros 127) | 2097 Oct 21 (Saros 128) | 2108 Sep 20 (Saros 129) | 2119 Aug 20 (Saros 130) |
| 2130 Jul 21 (Saros 131) | 2141 Jun 19 (Saros 132) | 2152 May 18 (Saros 133) | 2163 Apr 19 (Saros 134) | 2174 Mar 18 (Saros 135) |
| 2185 Feb 14 (Saros 136) | 2196 Jan 15 (Saros 137) | | | |

=== Inex series ===
This eclipse is a part of the long period inex cycle, repeating at alternating nodes, every 358 synodic months (≈ 10,571.95 days, or 29 years minus 20 days). Their appearance and longitude are irregular due to a lack of synchronization with the anomalistic month (period of perigee). However, groupings of 3 inex cycles (≈ 87 years minus 2 months) comes close (≈ 1,151.02 anomalistic months), so eclipses are similar in these groupings.

Series members between 1801 and 2200
| 1818 Oct 14 (Saros 114) | 1847 Sep 24 (Saros 115) | 1876 Sep 03 (Saros 116) |
| 1905 Aug 15 (Saros 117) | 1934 Jul 26 (Saros 118) | 1963 Jul 06 (Saros 119) |
| 1992 Jun 15 (Saros 120) | 2021 May 26 (Saros 121) | 2050 May 06 (Saros 122) |
| 2079 Apr 16 (Saros 123) | 2108 Mar 27 (Saros 124) | 2137 Mar 07 (Saros 125) |
| 2166 Feb 15 (Saros 126) | 2195 Jan 26 (Saros 127) | |

=== Half-Saros cycle ===
A lunar eclipse will be preceded and followed by solar eclipses by 9 years and 5.5 days (a half saros). This lunar eclipse is related to two annular solar eclipses of Solar Saros 128.

| May 20, 2012 | June 1, 2030 |

== See also ==
- List of lunar eclipses and List of 21st-century lunar eclipses
