= March 1913 lunar eclipse =

Total lunar eclipse

- Total eclipse
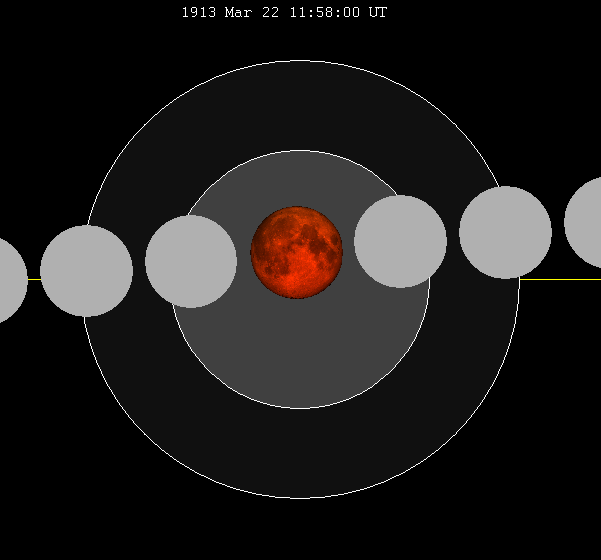
- The Moon's hourly motion shown right to left
- Date: March 22, 1913
- Gamma: 0.16714
- Magnitude: 1.56828
- Saros cycle: 121 (49 of 82)
- Totality: 92 minutes, 46.6 seconds
- Partiality: 209 minutes, 25.8 seconds
- Penumbral: 319 minutes, 46.7 seconds
Contacts (UTC)
- P1: 09:17:42.0
- U1: 10:12:50.7
- U2: 11:11:10.5
- Greatest: 11:57:34.1
- U3: 12:43:57.1
- U4: 13:42:16.5
- P4: 14:37:28.7

A total lunar eclipse occurred at the Moon's descending node of orbit on March 22, 1913, with a magnitude of 1.5683. It was a central lunar eclipse, where the Moon passed through the center of Earth's shadow. A total lunar eclipse occurs when the Moon passes completely through the Earth's umbra, causing it to be darkened. A lunar eclipse can be viewed throughout the entire night side of the Earth. This eclipse was a member of Lunar Saros 121.

== Visibility ==
The eclipse was completely visible over the Pacific ocean, seen rising over Asia, and setting over the Americas.

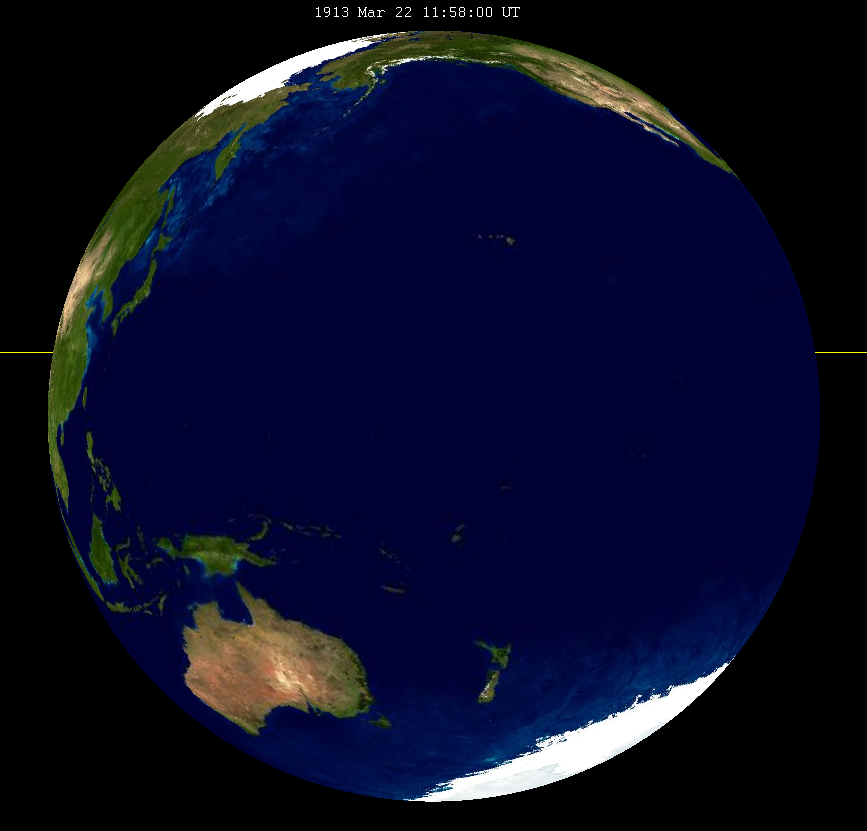
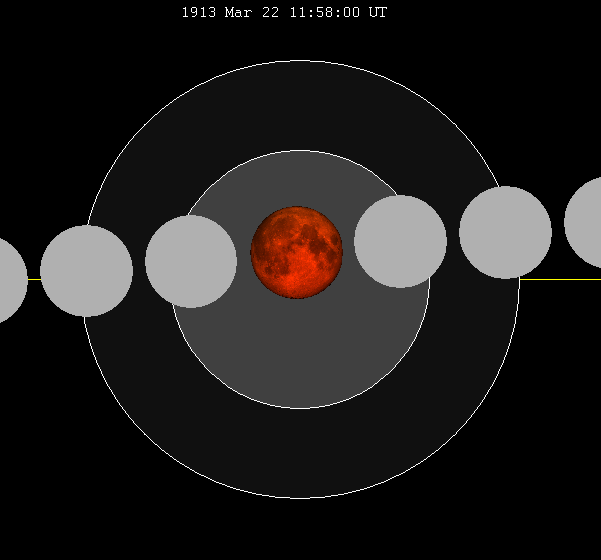

== Details ==
Below is a table displaying technical details and parameters of the eclipse.

Parameter	Value
Penumbral magnitude	2.53401
Umbral magnitude	1.56828
Gamma	0.16714
Sun right ascension	00^{h} 04^{m} 39.0^{s}
Sun declination	+00° 30′ 15.3″
Sun semi-diameter	16'02.7"
Sun equatorial horizontal parallax	08.8"
Moon right ascension	12^{h} 04^{m} 58.8^{s}
Moon declination	−00° 21′ 21.1″
Moon semi-diameter	16'36.9"
Moon equatorial horizontal parallax	1°00'58.7"
ΔT	14.8 s

== Eclipse season ==
This eclipse is part of an eclipse season, a period of roughly 35 days when eclipses can occur. They repeat around every six months, meaning that two or three eclipse seasons can occur each year. Two to three eclipses can occur per eclipse season, separated by a fortnight.

Eclipse season of March–April 1913
March 22 Descending node (full moon)	April 6 Ascending node (new moon)
Total lunar eclipse Lunar Saros 121	Partial solar eclipse Solar Saros 147

== Related eclipses ==
=== Eclipses in 1913 ===
- A total lunar eclipse on March 22.
- A partial solar eclipse on April 6.
- A partial solar eclipse on August 31.
- A total lunar eclipse on September 15.
- A partial solar eclipse on September 30.

=== Lunar Saros 121 ===
- Preceded by: Lunar eclipse of March 11, 1895
- Followed by: Lunar eclipse of April 2, 1931

=== Lunar eclipses of 1912–1915 ===
This eclipse is a member of a semester series. An eclipse in a semester series of lunar eclipses repeats approximately every 177 days and 4 hours (a semester) at alternating nodes of the Moon's orbit.

The penumbral lunar eclipses on January 31, 1915 and July 26, 1915 occur in the next lunar year eclipse set.

Lunar eclipse series sets from 1912 to 1915
Descending node				Ascending node			
Saros	Date Viewing	Type Chart	Gamma	Saros	Date Viewing	Type Chart	Gamma
111	1912 Apr 01	Partial	0.9116	116	1912 Sep 26	Partial	−0.9320
121	1913 Mar 22	Total	0.1671	126	1913 Sep 15	Total	−0.2109
131	1914 Mar 12	Partial	−0.5254	136	1914 Sep 04	Partial	0.5301
141	1915 Mar 01	Penumbral	−1.2573	146	1915 Aug 24	Penumbral	1.2435

=== Saros 121 ===
This eclipse is a part of Saros series 121, repeating every 18 years, 11 days, and containing 82 events. The series started with a penumbral lunar eclipse on October 6, 1047. It contains partial eclipses from May 10, 1408 through July 3, 1498; total eclipses from July 13, 1516 through May 26, 2021; and a second set of partial eclipses from June 6, 2039 through August 11, 2147. The series ends at member 82 as a penumbral eclipse on March 18, 2508.

The longest duration of totality was produced by member 43 at 100 minutes, 29 seconds on October 18, 1660. All eclipses in this series occur at the Moon’s descending node of orbit.

Greatest	First			
The greatest eclipse of the series occurred on 1660 Oct 18, lasting 100 minutes, 29 seconds.	Penumbral	Partial	Total	Central
The greatest eclipse of the series occurred on 1660 Oct 18, lasting 100 minutes, 29 seconds.	1047 Oct 06	1408 May 10	1516 Jul 13	1570 Aug 15
The greatest eclipse of the series occurred on 1660 Oct 18, lasting 100 minutes, 29 seconds.	Last			
The greatest eclipse of the series occurred on 1660 Oct 18, lasting 100 minutes, 29 seconds.	Central	Total	Partial	Penumbral
The greatest eclipse of the series occurred on 1660 Oct 18, lasting 100 minutes, 29 seconds.	1949 Apr 13	2021 May 26	2147 Aug 11	2508 Mar 18

Eclipses are tabulated in three columns; every third eclipse in the same column is one exeligmos apart, so they all cast shadows over approximately the same parts of the Earth.

Series members 43–64 occur between 1801 and 2200:
43	44	45
1805 Jan 15	1823 Jan 26	1841 Feb 06
46	47	48
1859 Feb 17	1877 Feb 27	1895 Mar 11
49	50	51
1913 Mar 22	1931 Apr 02	1949 Apr 13
52	53	54
1967 Apr 24	1985 May 04	2003 May 16
55	56	57
2021 May 26	2039 Jun 06	2057 Jun 17
58	59	60
2075 Jun 28	2093 Jul 08	2111 Jul 21
61	62	63
2129 Jul 31	2147 Aug 11	2165 Aug 21
64
2183 Sep 02

=== Tritos series ===
This eclipse is a part of a tritos cycle, repeating at alternating nodes every 135 synodic months (≈ 3986.63 days, or 11 years minus 1 month). Their appearance and longitude are irregular due to a lack of synchronization with the anomalistic month (period of perigee), but groupings of 3 tritos cycles (≈ 33 years minus 3 months) come close (≈ 434.044 anomalistic months), so eclipses are similar in these groupings.

Series members between 1801 and 2200
1804 Jan 26 (Saros 111)	1814 Dec 26 (Saros 112)	1825 Nov 25 (Saros 113)	1836 Oct 24 (Saros 114)	1847 Sep 24 (Saros 115)
1858 Aug 24 (Saros 116)	1869 Jul 23 (Saros 117)	1880 Jun 22 (Saros 118)	1891 May 23 (Saros 119)	1902 Apr 22 (Saros 120)
1913 Mar 22 (Saros 121)	1924 Feb 20 (Saros 122)	1935 Jan 19 (Saros 123)	1945 Dec 19 (Saros 124)	1956 Nov 18 (Saros 125)
1967 Oct 18 (Saros 126)	1978 Sep 16 (Saros 127)	1989 Aug 17 (Saros 128)	2000 Jul 16 (Saros 129)	2011 Jun 15 (Saros 130)
2022 May 16 (Saros 131)	2033 Apr 14 (Saros 132)	2044 Mar 13 (Saros 133)	2055 Feb 11 (Saros 134)	2066 Jan 11 (Saros 135)
2076 Dec 10 (Saros 136)	2087 Nov 10 (Saros 137)	2098 Oct 10 (Saros 138)	2109 Sep 09 (Saros 139)	2120 Aug 09 (Saros 140)
2131 Jul 10 (Saros 141)	2142 Jun 08 (Saros 142)	2153 May 08 (Saros 143)	2164 Apr 07 (Saros 144)	2175 Mar 07 (Saros 145)
2186 Feb 04 (Saros 146)	2197 Jan 04 (Saros 147)			

=== Inex series ===
This eclipse is a part of the long period inex cycle, repeating at alternating nodes, every 358 synodic months (≈ 10,571.95 days, or 29 years minus 20 days). Their appearance and longitude are irregular due to a lack of synchronization with the anomalistic month (period of perigee). However, groupings of 3 inex cycles (≈ 87 years minus 2 months) comes close (≈ 1,151.02 anomalistic months), so eclipses are similar in these groupings.

Series members between 1801 and 2200
1826 May 21 (Saros 118)	1855 May 02 (Saros 119)	1884 Apr 10 (Saros 120)
1913 Mar 22 (Saros 121)	1942 Mar 03 (Saros 122)	1971 Feb 10 (Saros 123)
2000 Jan 21 (Saros 124)	2028 Dec 31 (Saros 125)	2057 Dec 11 (Saros 126)
2086 Nov 20 (Saros 127)	2115 Nov 02 (Saros 128)	2144 Oct 11 (Saros 129)
2173 Sep 21 (Saros 130)

=== Half-Saros cycle ===
Lunar eclipses are preceded and followed by solar eclipses at intervals of 9 years 5.5 days, called a half saros or sar. This lunar eclipse is related to two solar eclipses of Solar Saros 128.

March 17, 1904	March 28, 1922
