= June 2039 lunar eclipse =

Astronomical event

- Partial eclipse
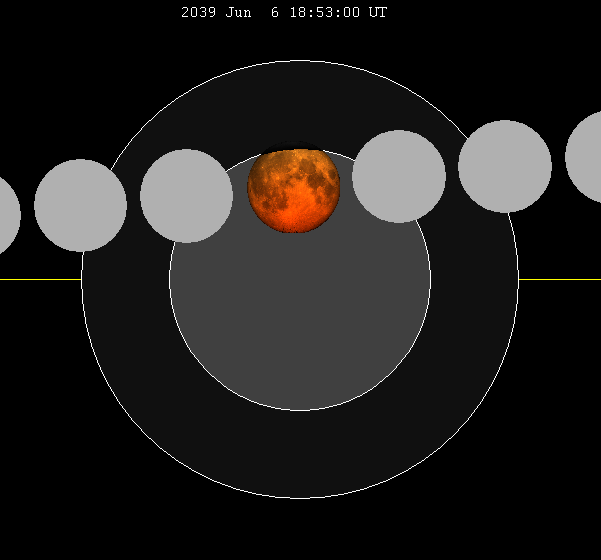
- The Moon's hourly motion shown right to left
- Date: June 6, 2039
- Gamma: 0.5460
- Magnitude: 0.8863
- Saros cycle: 121 (57 of 84)
- Partiality: 179 minutes, 20 seconds
- Penumbral: 296 minutes, 42 seconds
Contacts (UTC)
- P1: 16:26:04
- U1: 17:24:46
- Greatest: 18:54:25
- U4: 20:24:04
- P4: 21:22:46

A partial lunar eclipse will occur at the Moon’s descending node of orbit on Monday, June 6, 2039, with an umbral magnitude of 0.8863. A lunar eclipse occurs when the Moon moves into the Earth's shadow, causing the Moon to be darkened. A partial lunar eclipse occurs when one part of the Moon is in the Earth's umbra, while the other part is in the Earth's penumbra. Unlike a solar eclipse, which can only be viewed from a relatively small area of the world, a lunar eclipse may be viewed from anywhere on the night side of Earth. Occurring only about 11 hours after perigee (on June 6, 2039, at 8:00 UTC), the Moon's apparent diameter will be larger.

== Visibility ==
The eclipse will be completely visible over east Africa, Antarctica, Asia, and Australia, seen rising over west Africa, Europe, and eastern South America and setting over the western Pacific Ocean and northeast Asia.

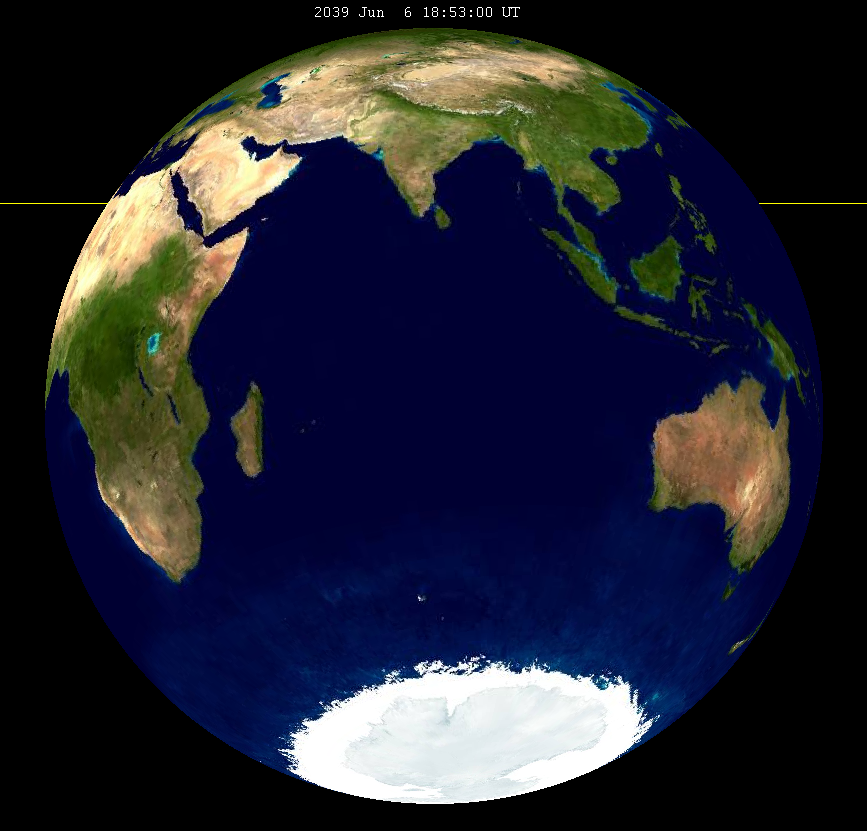
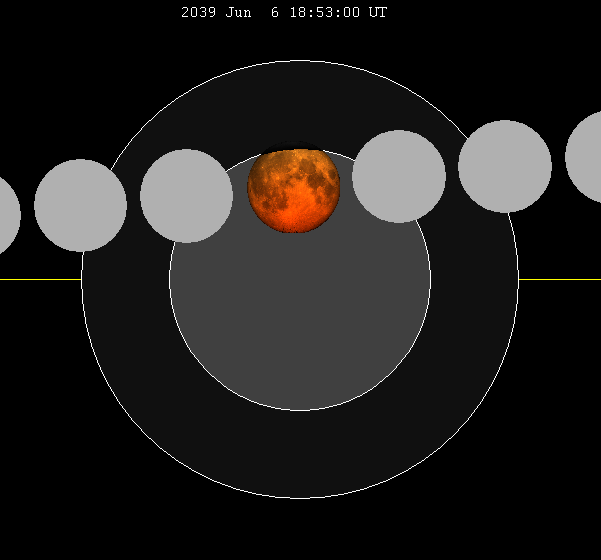

== Eclipse details ==
Shown below is a table displaying details about this particular lunar eclipse. It describes various parameters pertaining to this eclipse.

June 6, 2039 Lunar Eclipse Parameters
Parameter	Value
Penumbral Magnitude	1.82885
Umbral Magnitude	0.88627
Gamma	0.54599
Sun Right Ascension	04h58m56.4s
Sun Declination	+22°41'33.8"
Sun Semi-Diameter	15'45.7"
Sun Equatorial Horizontal Parallax	08.7"
Moon Right Ascension	16h59m25.6s
Moon Declination	-22°08'44.6"
Moon Semi-Diameter	16'43.4"
Moon Equatorial Horizontal Parallax	1°01'22.4"
ΔT	78.8 s

== Eclipse season ==
This eclipse is part of an eclipse season, a period, roughly every six months, when eclipses occur. Only two (or occasionally three) eclipse seasons occur each year, and each season lasts about 35 days and repeats just short of six months (173 days) later; thus two full eclipse seasons always occur each year. Either two or three eclipses happen each eclipse season. In the sequence below, each eclipse is separated by a fortnight.

Eclipse season of June 2039
June 6 Descending node (full moon)	June 21 Ascending node (new moon)
Partial lunar eclipse Lunar Saros 121	Annular solar eclipse Solar Saros 147

== Related eclipses ==
=== Eclipses in 2039 ===
- A partial lunar eclipse on June 6.
- An annular solar eclipse on June 21.
- A partial lunar eclipse on November 30.
- A total solar eclipse on December 15.

=== Metonic ===
- Preceded by: Lunar eclipse of August 19, 2035
- Followed by: Lunar eclipse of March 25, 2043

=== Tzolkinex ===
- Preceded by: Lunar eclipse of April 25, 2032
- Followed by: Lunar eclipse of July 18, 2046

=== Half-Saros ===
- Preceded by: Solar eclipse of June 1, 2030
- Followed by: Solar eclipse of June 11, 2048

=== Tritos ===
- Preceded by: Lunar eclipse of July 6, 2028
- Followed by: Lunar eclipse of May 6, 2050

=== Lunar Saros 121 ===
- Preceded by: Lunar eclipse of May 26, 2021
- Followed by: Lunar eclipse of June 17, 2057

=== Inex ===
- Preceded by: Lunar eclipse of June 26, 2010
- Followed by: Lunar eclipse of May 17, 2068

=== Triad ===
- Preceded by: Lunar eclipse of August 5, 1952
- Followed by: Lunar eclipse of April 7, 2126

=== Lunar eclipses of 2038–2042 ===
This eclipse is a member of a semester series. An eclipse in a semester series of lunar eclipses repeats approximately every 177 days and 4 hours (a semester) at alternating nodes of the Moon's orbit.

The penumbral lunar eclipses on January 21, 2038 and July 16, 2038 occur in the previous lunar year eclipse set, and the penumbral lunar eclipses on April 5, 2042 and September 29, 2042 occur in the next lunar year eclipse set.

Lunar eclipse series sets from 2038 to 2042
Descending node				Ascending node			
Saros	Date Viewing	Type Chart	Gamma	Saros	Date Viewing	Type Chart	Gamma
111	2038 Jun 17	Penumbral	1.3082	116	2038 Dec 11	Penumbral	−1.1448
121	2039 Jun 06	Partial	0.5460	126	2039 Nov 30	Partial	−0.4721
131	2040 May 26	Total	−0.1872	136	2040 Nov 18	Total	0.2361
141	2041 May 16	Partial	−0.9746	146	2041 Nov 08	Partial	0.9212
				156	2042 Oct 28	Penumbral	−

=== Saros 121 ===
This eclipse is a part of Saros series 121, repeating every 18 years, 11 days, and containing 82 events. The series started with a penumbral lunar eclipse on October 6, 1047. It contains partial eclipses from May 10, 1408 through July 3, 1498; total eclipses from July 13, 1516 through May 26, 2021; and a second set of partial eclipses from June 6, 2039 through August 11, 2147. The series ends at member 82 as a penumbral eclipse on March 18, 2508.

The longest duration of totality was produced by member 43 at 100 minutes, 29 seconds on October 18, 1660. All eclipses in this series occur at the Moon’s descending node of orbit.

Greatest	First			
The greatest eclipse of the series occurred on 1660 Oct 18, lasting 100 minutes, 29 seconds.	Penumbral	Partial	Total	Central
The greatest eclipse of the series occurred on 1660 Oct 18, lasting 100 minutes, 29 seconds.	1047 Oct 06	1408 May 10	1516 Jul 13	1570 Aug 15
The greatest eclipse of the series occurred on 1660 Oct 18, lasting 100 minutes, 29 seconds.	Last			
The greatest eclipse of the series occurred on 1660 Oct 18, lasting 100 minutes, 29 seconds.	Central	Total	Partial	Penumbral
The greatest eclipse of the series occurred on 1660 Oct 18, lasting 100 minutes, 29 seconds.	1949 Apr 13	2021 May 26	2147 Aug 11	2508 Mar 18

Eclipses are tabulated in three columns; every third eclipse in the same column is one exeligmos apart, so they all cast shadows over approximately the same parts of the Earth.

Series members 43–64 occur between 1801 and 2200:
43	44	45
1805 Jan 15	1823 Jan 26	1841 Feb 06
46	47	48
1859 Feb 17	1877 Feb 27	1895 Mar 11
49	50	51
1913 Mar 22	1931 Apr 02	1949 Apr 13
52	53	54
1967 Apr 24	1985 May 04	2003 May 16
55	56	57
2021 May 26	2039 Jun 06	2057 Jun 17
58	59	60
2075 Jun 28	2093 Jul 08	2111 Jul 21
61	62	63
2129 Jul 31	2147 Aug 11	2165 Aug 21
64
2183 Sep 02

=== Tritos series ===
This eclipse is a part of a tritos cycle, repeating at alternating nodes every 135 synodic months (≈ 3986.63 days, or 11 years minus 1 month). Their appearance and longitude are irregular due to a lack of synchronization with the anomalistic month (period of perigee), but groupings of 3 tritos cycles (≈ 33 years minus 3 months) come close (≈ 434.044 anomalistic months), so eclipses are similar in these groupings.

Series members between 1801 and 2200
1810 Mar 21 (Saros 100)	1821 Feb 17 (Saros 101)	1832 Jan 17 (Saros 102)	1842 Dec 17 (Saros 103)	
1864 Oct 15 (Saros 105)	1875 Sep 15 (Saros 106)	1886 Aug 14 (Saros 107)	1897 Jul 14 (Saros 108)	1908 Jun 14 (Saros 109)
1919 May 15 (Saros 110)	1930 Apr 13 (Saros 111)	1941 Mar 13 (Saros 112)	1952 Feb 11 (Saros 113)	1963 Jan 09 (Saros 114)
1973 Dec 10 (Saros 115)	1984 Nov 08 (Saros 116)	1995 Oct 08 (Saros 117)	2006 Sep 07 (Saros 118)	2017 Aug 07 (Saros 119)
2028 Jul 06 (Saros 120)	2039 Jun 06 (Saros 121)	2050 May 06 (Saros 122)	2061 Apr 04 (Saros 123)	2072 Mar 04 (Saros 124)
2083 Feb 02 (Saros 125)	2094 Jan 01 (Saros 126)	2104 Dec 02 (Saros 127)	2115 Nov 02 (Saros 128)	2126 Oct 01 (Saros 129)
2137 Aug 30 (Saros 130)	2148 Jul 31 (Saros 131)	2159 Jun 30 (Saros 132)	2170 May 30 (Saros 133)	2181 Apr 29 (Saros 134)
2192 Mar 28 (Saros 135)

=== Inex series ===
This eclipse is a part of the long period inex cycle, repeating at alternating nodes, every 358 synodic months (≈ 10,571.95 days, or 29 years minus 20 days). Their appearance and longitude are irregular due to a lack of synchronization with the anomalistic month (period of perigee). However, groupings of 3 inex cycles (≈ 87 years minus 2 months) comes close (≈ 1,151.02 anomalistic months), so eclipses are similar in these groupings.

Series members between 1801 and 2200
1807 Nov 15 (Saros 113)	1836 Oct 24 (Saros 114)	1865 Oct 04 (Saros 115)
1894 Sep 15 (Saros 116)	1923 Aug 26 (Saros 117)	1952 Aug 05 (Saros 118)
1981 Jul 17 (Saros 119)	2010 Jun 26 (Saros 120)	2039 Jun 06 (Saros 121)
2068 May 17 (Saros 122)	2097 Apr 26 (Saros 123)	2126 Apr 07 (Saros 124)
2155 Mar 19 (Saros 125)	2184 Feb 26 (Saros 126)	

=== Half-Saros cycle ===
A lunar eclipse will be preceded and followed by solar eclipses by 9 years and 5.5 days (a half saros). This lunar eclipse is related to two total solar eclipses of Solar Saros 128.

June 1, 2030	June 11, 2048

== See also ==
- List of lunar eclipses and List of 21st-century lunar eclipses
