= Lunar Saros 121 =

Ongoing Lunar Eclipses

Member 54	Member 55
2003 May 16	2021 May 26

Saros cycle series 121 for lunar eclipses occurs at the moon's descending node. It began in 1029 and will end in 2526. It contains 84 member lunar eclipses, each separated by 18 years 11 and 1/3 days, and will last 1496.5 years.

The series contains 29 total lunar eclipses between 1560 and 2021. It contains seven partial eclipses from 1398 to 1490 and seven more between 2039 and 2147.

The last occurrence of this series was the last total lunar eclipse on May 26, 2021. The next occurrence on June 6, 2039 will be the first partial lunar eclipse, second set of partial lunar eclipses of this series.

The longest totality occurred at series member 26, on October 18, 1660, lasting 102 minutes.

This lunar saros is linked to Solar Saros 128.

== List ==
Cat.	Saros	Mem	Date	Time UT (hr:mn)	Type	Gamma	Magnitude	Duration (min)			Contacts UT (hr:mn)						Chart
Cat.	Saros	Mem	Date	Greatest	Type	Gamma	Magnitude	Pen.	Par.	Tot.	P1	P4	U1	U2	U3	U4	Chart
07335	121	1	1047 Oct 06	19:05:28	Penumbral	-1.5573	-1.0450	67.2			18:31:52	19:39:04					
07379	121	2	1065 Oct 17	2:42:50	Penumbral	-1.5292	-0.9943	97.5			1:54:05	3:31:35					
07423	121	3	1083 Oct 28	10:27:33	Penumbral	-1.5062	-0.9530	116.2			9:29:27	11:25:39					
07469	121	4	1101 Nov 7	18:20:53	Penumbral	-1.4895	-0.9228	127.7			17:17:02	19:24:44					
07515	121	5	1119 Nov 19	2:18:55	Penumbral	-1.476	-0.8981	136.2			1:10:49	3:27:01					
07561	121	6	1137 Nov 29	10:23:17	Penumbral	-1.4668	-0.8810	141.3			9:12:38	11:33:56					
07608	121	7	1155 Dec 10	18:29:45	Penumbral	-1.4587	-0.8655	145.5			17:17:00	19:42:30					
07655	121	8	1173 Dec 21	2:37:51	Penumbral	-1.451	-0.8504	149.1			1:23:18	3:52:24					
07701	121	9	1192 Jan 1	10:45:09	Penumbral	-1.442	-0.8325	153.1			9:28:36	12:01:42					
07747	121	10	1210 Jan 11	18:51:00	Penumbral	-1.4309	-0.8105	157.8			17:32:06	20:09:54					
07793	121	11	1228 Jan 23	2:52:19	Penumbral	-1.4157	-0.7805	164.1			1:30:16	4:14:22					
07838	121	12	1246 Feb 02	10:48:40	Penumbral	-1.3956	-0.7413	172.1			9:22:37	12:14:43					
07883	121	13	1264 Feb 13	18:38:57	Penumbral	-1.3699	-0.6915	181.7			17:08:06	20:09:48					
07928	121	14	1282 Feb 24	2:23:04	Penumbral	-1.3383	-0.6307	192.7			0:46:43	3:59:25					
07973	121	15	1300 Mar 06	9:58:08	Penumbral	-1.2987	-0.5550	205.4			8:15:26	11:40:50					
08016	121	16	1318 Mar 17	17:27:00	Penumbral	-1.2533	-0.4687	218.5			15:37:45	19:16:15					
08059	121	17	1336 Mar 28	0:47:28	Penumbral	-1.2002	-0.3682	232.3			22:51:19	2:43:37					
08101	121	18	1354 Apr 08	8:02:44	Penumbral	-1.1418	-0.2580	245.7			5:59:53	10:05:35					
08142	121	19	1372 Apr 18	15:09:54	Penumbral	-1.0757	-0.1338	259.3			13:00:15	17:19:33					
08183	121	20	1390 Apr 29	22:13:51	Penumbral	-1.0059	-0.0029	271.9			19:57:54	0:29:48					
08224	121	21	1408 May 10	5:12:17	Partial	-0.9307	0.1378	283.7	86.1		2:50:26	7:34:08	4:29:14			5:55:20	
08265	121	22	1426 May 21	12:09:04	Partial	-0.8528	0.2833	294.4	120.4		9:41:52	14:36:16	11:08:52			13:09:16	
08307	121	23	1444 May 31	19:03:18	Partial	-0.7715	0.4347	303.9	145.3		16:31:21	21:35:15	17:50:39			20:15:57	
08348	121	24	1462 Jun 12	1:58:55	Partial	-0.6901	0.5860	312.0	164.2		23:22:55	4:34:55	0:36:49			3:21:01	
08388	121	25	1480 Jun 22	8:55:27	Partial	-0.6085	0.7375	318.9	179.1		6:16:00	11:34:54	7:25:54			10:25:00	
08428	121	26	1498 Jul 03	15:54:47	Partial	-0.5279	0.8867	324.4	190.8		13:12:35	18:36:59	14:19:23			17:30:11	
08468	121	27	1516 Jul 13	22:58:24	Total	-0.4501	1.0308	328.7	199.7	27.4	20:14:03	1:42:45	21:18:33	22:44:42	23:12:06	0:38:15	
08509	121	28	1534 Jul 25	6:07:01	Total	-0.3754	1.1688	331.9	206.4	61.1	3:21:04	8:52:58	4:23:49	5:36:28	6:37:34	7:50:13	
08551	121	29	1552 Aug 04	13:22:37	Total	-0.3055	1.2978	334.1	211.3	77.5	10:35:34	16:09:40	11:36:58	12:43:52	14:01:22	15:08:16	
08595	121	30	1570 Aug 15	20:44:34	Total	-0.2401	1.4183	335.4	214.6	87.6	17:56:52	23:32:16	18:57:16	20:00:46	21:28:22	22:31:52	
08638	121	31	1588 Sep 05	4:15:59	Total	-0.1818	1.5254	336.0	216.6	93.8	1:27:59	7:03:59	2:27:41	3:29:05	5:02:53	6:04:17	
08681	121	32	1606 Sep 16	11:55:21	Total	-0.1295	1.6216	336.0	217.7	97.5	9:07:21	14:43:21	10:06:30	11:06:36	12:44:06	13:44:12	
08726	121	33	1624 Sep 26	19:44:24	Total	-0.0845	1.7042	335.6	218.0	99.5	16:56:36	22:32:12	17:55:24	18:54:39	20:34:09	21:33:24	
08770	121	34	1642 Oct 08	3:42:19	Total	-0.0462	1.7746	335.0	217.9	100.3	0:54:49	6:29:49	1:53:22	2:52:10	4:32:28	5:31:16	
08815	121	35	1660 Oct 18	11:50:08	Total	-0.0151	1.8316	334.2	217.5	100.5	9:03:02	14:37:14	10:01:23	10:59:53	12:40:23	13:38:53	
08860	121	36	1678 Oct 29	20:06:20	Total	0.0093	1.8422	333.2	216.9	100.2	17:19:44	22:52:56	18:17:53	19:16:14	20:56:26	21:54:47	
08906	121	37	1696 Nov 09	4:30:21	Total	0.0281	1.8078	332.3	216.3	99.8	1:44:12	7:16:30	2:42:12	3:40:27	5:20:15	6:18:30	
08952	121	38	1714 Nov 21	13:01:44	Total	0.0414	1.7836	331.3	215.6	99.4	10:16:05	15:47:23	11:13:56	12:12:02	13:51:26	14:49:32	
08999	121	39	1732 Dec 01	21:39:42	Total	0.0502	1.7678	330.4	215.1	99.0	18:54:30	0:24:54	19:52:09	20:50:12	22:29:12	23:27:15	
09046	121	40	1750 Dec 13	6:21:46	Total	0.0561	1.7576	329.5	214.5	98.7	3:37:01	9:06:31	4:34:31	5:32:25	7:11:07	8:09:01	
09093	121	41	1768 Dec 23	15:07:13	Total	0.0597	1.7517	328.6	214.1	98.4	12:22:55	17:51:31	13:20:10	14:18:01	15:56:25	16:54:16	
09138	121	42	1787 Jan 03	23:53:37	Total	0.0632	1.7465	327.6	213.6	98.2	21:09:49	2:37:25	22:06:49	23:04:31	0:42:43	1:40:25	
09183	121	43	1805 Jan 15	8:40:58	Total	0.0663	1.7420	326.7	213.2	98.1	5:57:37	11:24:19	6:54:22	7:51:55	9:30:01	10:27:34	
09228	121	44	1823 Jan 26	17:24:54	Total	0.0729	1.7314	325.7	212.8	97.8	14:42:03	20:07:45	15:38:30	16:36:00	18:13:48	19:11:18	
09274	121	45	1841 Feb 06	2:07:13	Total	0.0812	1.7178	324.7	212.4	97.5	23:24:52	4:49:34	0:21:01	1:18:28	2:55:58	3:53:25	
09319	121	46	1859 Feb 17	10:43:28	Total	0.0950	1.6944	323.6	211.9	96.9	8:01:40	13:25:16	8:57:31	9:55:01	11:31:55	12:29:25	
09363	121	47	1877 Feb 27	19:15:38	Total	0.1125	1.6644	322.5	211.3	96.2	16:34:23	21:56:53	17:29:59	18:27:32	20:03:44	21:01:17	
09407	121	48	1895 Mar 11	3:39:10	Total	0.1376	1.6204	321.2	210.5	94.8	0:58:34	6:19:46	1:53:55	2:51:46	4:26:34	5:24:25	
09449	121	49	1913 Mar 22	11:57:49	Total	0.1671	1.5683	319.7	209.4	92.8	9:17:58	14:37:40	10:13:07	11:11:25	12:44:13	13:42:31	
09491	121	50	1931 Apr 02	20:07:55	Total	0.2043	1.5021	317.9	207.8	89.6	17:28:58	22:46:52	18:24:01	19:23:07	20:52:43	21:51:49	
09533	121	51	1949 Apr 13	4:11:25	Total	0.2474	1.4251	315.8	205.7	84.9	1:33:31	6:49:19	2:28:34	3:28:58	4:53:52	5:54:16	
09574	121	52	1967 Apr 24	12:07:04	Total	0.2972	1.3356	313.3	202.8	77.9	9:30:25	14:43:43	10:25:40	11:28:07	12:46:01	13:48:28	
09616	121	53	1985 May 04	19:57:19	Total	0.3519	1.2369	310.2	198.9	67.7	17:22:13	22:32:25	18:17:52	19:23:28	20:31:10	21:36:46	
09657	121	54	2003 May 16	3:41:13	Total	0.4123	1.1276	306.5	193.9	51.4	1:07:58	6:14:28	2:04:16	3:15:31	4:06:55	5:18:10	
09698	121	55	2021 May 26	11:19:53	Total	0.4774	1.0095	302.0	187.4	14.5	8:48:53	13:50:53	9:46:11	11:12:38	11:27:08	12:53:35	
09739	121	56	2039 Jun 06	18:54:25	Partial	0.5460	0.8846	296.7	179.3		16:26:04	21:22:46	17:24:46			20:24:04	
09779	121	57	2057 Jun 17	2:26:20	Partial	0.6167	0.7555	290.6	169.3		0:01:02	4:51:38	1:01:41			3:50:59	
09820	121	58	2075 Jun 28	9:55:35	Partial	0.6897	0.6220	283.4	157.0		7:33:53	12:17:17	8:37:05			11:14:05	
09861	121	59	2093 Jul 08	17:24:18	Partial	0.7632	0.4872	275.3	141.9		15:06:39	19:41:57	16:13:21			18:35:15	
09903	121	60	2111 Jul 21	0:53:17	Partial	0.8362	0.3530	266.3	123.2		22:40:08	3:06:26	23:51:41			1:54:53	
09945	121	61	2129 Jul 31	8:24:31	Partial	0.9070	0.2224	256.5	99.7		6:16:16	10:32:46	7:34:40			9:14:22	
09988	121	62	2147 Aug 11	15:57:02	Partial	0.9765	0.0941	245.8	66.0		13:54:08	17:59:56	15:24:02			16:30:02	
10032	121	63	2165 Aug 21	23:34:21	Penumbral	1.0417	-0.0269	234.5			21:37:06	1:31:36					
10075	121	64	2183 Sep 02	7:15:22	Penumbral	1.1036	-0.1419	222.7			5:24:01	9:06:43					
10118	121	65	2201 Sep 13	15:03:17	Penumbral	1.1597	-0.2464	210.7			13:17:56	16:48:38					
10162	121	66	2219 Sep 24	22:55:52	Penumbral	1.2116	-0.3435	198.5			21:16:37	0:35:07					
10207	121	67	2237 Oct 05	6:57:02	Penumbral	1.2563	-0.4275	186.9			5:23:35	8:30:29					
10252	121	68	2255 Oct 16	15:04:25	Penumbral	1.2959	-0.5021	175.7			13:36:34	16:32:16					
10298	121	69	2273 Oct 26	23:19:49	Penumbral	1.3288	-0.5647	165.5			21:57:04	0:42:34					
10345	121	70	2291 Nov 07	7:41:44	Penumbral	1.3564	-0.6174	156.4			6:23:32	8:59:56					
10391	121	71	2309 Nov 18	16:10:56	Penumbral	1.3782	-0.6594	148.7			14:56:35	17:25:17					
10437	121	72	2327 Nov 30	0:45:50	Penumbral	1.3949	-0.6920	142.6			23:34:32	1:57:08					
10483	121	73	2345 Dec 10	9:24:58	Penumbral	1.4083	-0.7184	137.4			8:16:16	10:33:40					
10528	121	74	2363 Dec 21	18:08:30	Penumbral	1.4179	-0.7376	133.8			17:01:36	19:15:24					
10573	121	75	2382 Jan 01	2:54:07	Penumbral	1.4262	-0.7541	130.5			1:48:52	3:59:22					
10617	121	76	2400 Jan 12	11:40:47	Penumbral	1.4330	-0.7678	127.8			10:36:53	12:44:41					
10662	121	77	2418 Jan 22	20:25:46	Penumbral	1.4410	-0.7835	124.3			19:23:37	21:27:55					
10706	121	78	2436 Feb 03	5:08:57	Penumbral	1.4502	-0.8010	119.9			4:09:00	6:08:54					
10750	121	79	2454 Feb 13	13:48:10	Penumbral	1.4626	-0.8241	113.4			12:51:28	14:44:52					
10792	121	80	2472 Feb 24	22:21:41	Penumbral	1.4791	-0.8547	103.6			21:29:53	23:13:29					
10834	121	81	2490 Mar 07	6:48:56	Penumbral	1.5004	-0.8940	88.8			6:04:32	7:33:20					
10875	121	82	2508 Mar 18	15:08:38	Penumbral	1.5273	-0.9433	64.8			14:36:14	15:41:02					

== See also ==
- List of lunar eclipses
  - List of Saros series for lunar eclipses
