= Solar Saros 128 =

Saros cycle series 128 for solar eclipses

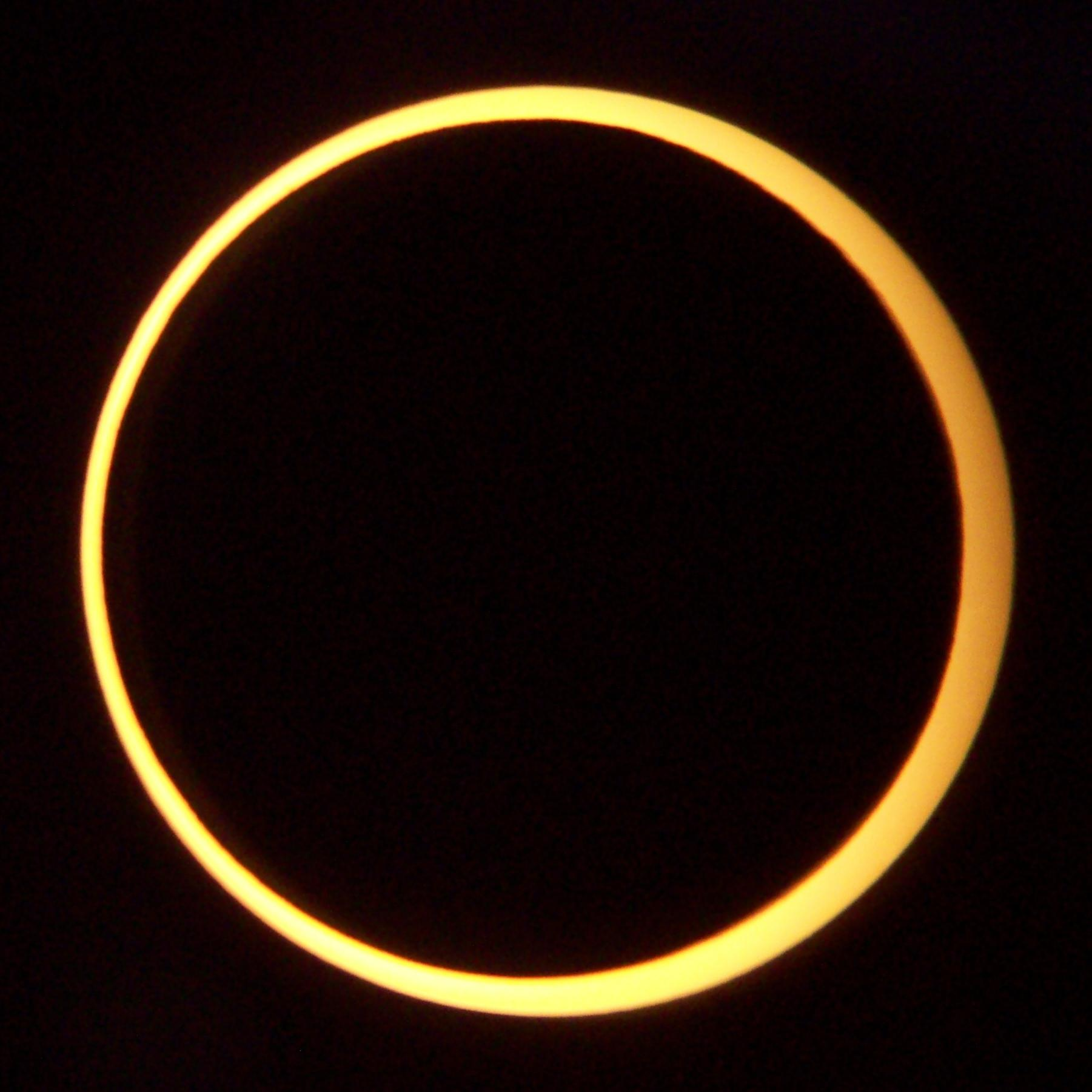
Annular, member 58, May 20, 2012 From Middlegate, Nevada

Animated path of entire Saros.

Saros cycle series 128 for solar eclipses occurs at the Moon's descending node, repeating every 18 years, 11 days, containing 73 eclipses, 40 of which are umbral (4 total, 4 hybrid, and 32 annular). The first eclipse in the series was on 29 August 984 and the last will be on 1 November 2282. The most recent eclipse was an annular eclipse on 20 May 2012 and the next will be an annular eclipse on 1 June 2030.

The longest totality was 1 minute 45 seconds on 7 June 1453 and the longest annular was 8 minutes 35 seconds on 1 February 1832.

This solar saros is linked to Lunar Saros 121.

== Umbral eclipses ==
Umbral eclipses (annular, total and hybrid) can be further classified as either: 1) Central (two limits), 2) Central (one limit) or 3) Non-Central (one limit). The statistical distribution of these classes in Saros series 128 appears in the following table.

| Classification | Number | Percent |
|---|---|---|
| All Umbral eclipses | 40 | 100.00% |
| Central (two limits) | 39 | 97.50% |
| Central (one limit) | 1 | 2.50% |
| Non-central (one limit) | 0 | 0.00% |

== All eclipses ==
Note: Dates are given in the Julian calendar prior to 15 October 1582, and in the Gregorian calendar after that.

| Saros | Member | Date | Time (Greatest) UTC | Type | Location Lat, Long | Gamma | Mag. | Width (km) | Duration (min:sec) | Ref |
|---|---|---|---|---|---|---|---|---|---|---|
| 128 | 1 | August 29, 984 | 8:35:40 | Partial | 61.3S 18.5W | −1.5263 | 0.0085 | | | |
| 128 | 2 | September 9, 1002 | 16:38:28 | Partial | 61.1S 148.4W | −1.484 | 0.0911 | | | |
| 128 | 3 | September 20, 1020 | 0:47:49 | Partial | 61S 80.2E | −1.4474 | 0.1625 | | | |
| 128 | 4 | October 1, 1038 | 9:05:32 | Partial | 61.2S 53.4W | −1.4177 | 0.2202 | | | |
| 128 | 5 | October 11, 1056 | 17:30:26 | Partial | 61.4S 171.3E | −1.3942 | 0.2656 | | | |
| 128 | 6 | October 23, 1074 | 2:01:48 | Partial | 61.9S 34.2E | −1.3765 | 0.2999 | | | |
| 128 | 7 | November 2, 1092 | 10:39:37 | Partial | 62.4S 104.5W | −1.3643 | 0.3234 | | | |
| 128 | 8 | November 13, 1110 | 19:22:20 | Partial | 63.2S 115.3E | −1.3568 | 0.338 | | | |
| 128 | 9 | November 24, 1128 | 4:09:27 | Partial | 64S 26.2W | −1.3531 | 0.3453 | | | |
| 128 | 10 | December 5, 1146 | 12:57:34 | Partial | 65S 168.3W | −1.3507 | 0.35 | | | |
| 128 | 11 | December 15, 1164 | 21:48:04 | Partial | 66S 48.7E | −1.3507 | 0.3502 | | | |
| 128 | 12 | December 27, 1182 | 6:37:09 | Partial | 67.1S 94.4W | −1.3505 | 0.3506 | | | |
| 128 | 13 | January 6, 1201 | 15:24:30 | Partial | 68.1S 122.4E | −1.3491 | 0.3532 | | | |
| 128 | 14 | January 18, 1219 | 0:06:47 | Partial | 69.1S 20.1W | −1.3445 | 0.3619 | | | |
| 128 | 15 | January 28, 1237 | 8:44:50 | Partial | 70S 162.2W | −1.3369 | 0.3759 | | | |
| 128 | 16 | February 8, 1255 | 17:15:43 | Partial | 70.8S 57E | −1.3244 | 0.3991 | | | |
| 128 | 17 | February 19, 1273 | 1:39:04 | Partial | 71.4S 82.5W | −1.3066 | 0.4321 | | | |
| 128 | 18 | March 2, 1291 | 9:53:49 | Partial | 71.8S 139.8E | −1.2826 | 0.4766 | | | |
| 128 | 19 | March 12, 1309 | 18:00:25 | Partial | 71.9S 3.9E | −1.2527 | 0.5323 | | | |
| 128 | 20 | March 24, 1327 | 1:56:52 | Partial | 71.8S 129.5W | −1.2152 | 0.602 | | | |
| 128 | 21 | April 3, 1345 | 9:44:58 | Partial | 71.5S 99.5E | −1.1717 | 0.683 | | | |
| 128 | 22 | April 14, 1363 | 17:23:47 | Partial | 70.9S 28.7W | −1.1212 | 0.7768 | | | |
| 128 | 23 | April 25, 1381 | 0:55:46 | Partial | 70.2S 154.8W | −1.0659 | 0.8794 | | | |
| 128 | 24 | May 6, 1399 | 8:18:28 | Partial | 69.3S 82.1E | −1.0035 | 0.9949 | | | |
| 128 | 25 | May 16, 1417 | 15:36:31 | Total | 48.9S 46.3W | −0.9378 | 1.0179 | 180 | 1m 30s | |
| 128 | 26 | May 27, 1435 | 22:47:54 | Total | 37.8S 160.2W | −0.867 | 1.0184 | 127 | 1m 43s | |
| 128 | 27 | June 7, 1453 | 5:56:44 | Total | 29.4S 88.7E | −0.7948 | 1.0175 | 99 | 1m 45s | |
| 128 | 28 | June 18, 1471 | 13:00:12 | Total | 22.3S 19.7W | −0.7189 | 1.0157 | 77 | 1m 38s | |
| 128 | 29 | June 28, 1489 | 20:04:24 | Hybrid (Note: Begins as annular and ends as total) | 16.8S 127.5W | −0.644 | 1.013 | 58 | 1m 23s | |
| 128 | 30 | July 10, 1507 | 3:06:33 | Hybrid | 12.4S 126E | −0.568 | 1.0095 | 40 | 1m 1s | |
| 128 | 31 | July 20, 1525 | 10:11:04 | Hybrid | 9.3S 19.4E | −0.4947 | 1.0054 | 21 | 0m 35s | |
| 128 | 32 | July 31, 1543 | 17:16:23 | Hybrid | 7.3S 87W | −0.4229 | 1.0007 | 3 | 0m 5s | |
| 128 | 33 | August 11, 1561 | 0:27:07 | Annular | 6.5S 165.5E | −0.3564 | 0.9956 | 16 | 0m 27s | |
| 128 | 34 | August 22, 1579 | 7:41:32 | Annular | 6.6S 57.2E | −0.2937 | 0.9901 | 36 | 1m 0s | |
| 128 | 35 | September 11, 1597 | 15:01:22 | Annular | 7.6S 52.4W | −0.2363 | 0.9843 | 57 | 1m 35s | |
| 128 | 36 | September 22, 1615 | 22:27:21 | Annular | 9.1S 163.5W | −0.1849 | 0.9784 | 78 | 2m 11s | |
| 128 | 37 | October 3, 1633 | 6:00:37 | Annular | 11.2S 83.4E | −0.1405 | 0.9726 | 99 | 2m 48s | |
| 128 | 38 | October 14, 1651 | 13:40:56 | Annular | 13.5S 31.3W | −0.1025 | 0.9668 | 120 | 3m 27s | |
| 128 | 39 | October 24, 1669 | 21:28:05 | Annular | 15.9S 147.7W | −0.071 | 0.9613 | 141 | 4m 7s | |
| 128 | 40 | November 5, 1687 | 5:22:24 | Annular | 18.3S 94.3E | −0.046 | 0.9561 | 160 | 4m 49s | |
| 128 | 41 | November 16, 1705 | 13:23:06 | Annular | 20.4S 25W | −0.0271 | 0.9514 | 178 | 5m 31s | |
| 128 | 42 | November 27, 1723 | 21:28:16 | Annular | 22S 145.2W | −0.0125 | 0.9471 | 195 | 6m 12s | |
| 128 | 43 | December 8, 1741 | 5:38:00 | Annular | 23S 93.6E | −0.0024 | 0.9434 | 209 | 6m 51s | |
| 128 | 44 | December 19, 1759 | 13:50:05 | Annular | 23.3S 28W | 0.0051 | 0.9404 | 221 | 7m 25s | |
| 128 | 45 | December 29, 1777 | 22:03:28 | Annular | 22.7S 150W | 0.011 | 0.938 | 231 | 7m 53s | |
| 128 | 46 | January 10, 1796 | 6:14:52 | Annular | 21.1S 88.3E | 0.0179 | 0.9362 | 238 | 8m 15s | |
| 128 | 47 | January 21, 1814 | 14:24:47 | Annular | 18.6S 33.4W | 0.0253 | 0.935 | 242 | 8m 28s | |
| 128 | 48 | February 1, 1832 | 22:30:14 | Annular | 15.3S 154.4W | 0.0355 | 0.9344 | 245 | 8m 35s | |
| 128 | 49 | February 12, 1850 | 6:29:37 | Annular | 11S 85.6E | 0.0503 | 0.9345 | 245 | 8m 35s | |
| 128 | 50 | February 23, 1868 | 14:21:31 | Annular | 6.1S 33W | 0.0706 | 0.9348 | 244 | 8m 30s | |
| 128 | 51 | March 5, 1886 | 22:05:26 | Annular | 0.5S 150.1W | 0.097 | 0.9357 | 241 | 8m 20s | |
| 128 | 52 | March 17, 1904 | 5:40:44 | Annular | 5.6N 94.7E | 0.1299 | 0.9367 | 237 | 8m 7s | |
| 128 | 53 | March 28, 1922 | 13:05:26 | Annular | 12.3N 18W | 0.1711 | 0.9381 | 233 | 7m 50s | |
| 128 | 54 | April 7, 1940 | 20:21:21 | Annular | 19.2N 128.5W | 0.219 | 0.9394 | 230 | 7m 30s | |
| 128 | 55 | April 19, 1958 | 3:27:17 | Annular | 26.5N 123.6E | 0.275 | 0.9408 | 228 | 7m 7s | |
| 128 | 56 | April 29, 1976 | 10:24:18 | Annular | 34N 18.3E | 0.3378 | 0.9421 | 227 | 6m 41s | |
| 128 | 57 | May 10, 1994 | 17:12:27 | Annular | 41.5N 84.1W | 0.4077 | 0.9431 | 230 | 6m 13s | |
| 128 | 58 | May 20, 2012 | 23:53:54 | Annular | 49.1N 176.3E | 0.4828 | 0.9439 | 237 | 5m 46s | |
| 128 | 59 | June 1, 2030 | 6:29:13 | Annular | 56.5N 80.1E | 0.5626 | 0.9443 | 250 | 5m 21s | |
| 128 | 60 | June 11, 2048 | 12:58:53 | Annular | 63.7N 11.5W | 0.6468 | 0.9441 | 272 | 4m 58s | |
| 128 | 61 | June 22, 2066 | 19:25:48 | Annular | 70.1N 96.4W | 0.733 | 0.9435 | 309 | 4m 40s | |
| 128 | 62 | July 3, 2084 | 1:50:26 | Annular | 75N 169.1W | 0.8208 | 0.9421 | 377 | 4m 25s | |
| 128 | 63 | July 15, 2102 | 8:15:14 | Annular | 75.9N 134.2E | 0.908 | 0.9398 | 539 | 4m 14s | |
| 128 | 64 | July 25, 2120 | 14:40:02 | Annular (Note: No southern limit) | 66N 90.4E | 0.9948 | 0.9343 | − | 4m 0s | |
| 128 | 65 | August 5, 2138 | 21:08:57 | Partial | 62.4N 9.2W | 1.0781 | 0.8285 | | | |
| 128 | 66 | August 16, 2156 | 3:41:28 | Partial | 61.9N 116.1W | 1.1584 | 0.6912 | | | |
| 128 | 67 | August 27, 2174 | 10:19:55 | Partial | 61.4N 135.6E | 1.2336 | 0.5629 | | | |
| 128 | 68 | September 6, 2192 | 17:05:08 | Partial | 61.2N 25.8E | 1.3032 | 0.4444 | | | |
| 128 | 69 | September 18, 2210 | 23:59:09 | Partial | 61N 86.2W | 1.3657 | 0.3384 | | | |
| 128 | 70 | September 29, 2228 | 7:02:08 | Partial | 61.1N 159.6E | 1.4212 | 0.2445 | | | |
| 128 | 71 | October 10, 2246 | 14:13:18 | Partial | 61.3N 43.4E | 1.4705 | 0.1615 | | | |
| 128 | 72 | October 20, 2264 | 21:35:23 | Partial | 61.6N 75.7W | 1.5111 | 0.0933 | | | |
| 128 | 73 | November 1, 2282 | 5:06:24 | Partial | 62.1N 163E | 1.5448 | 0.037 | | | |
