= June 1992 lunar eclipse =

Partial lunar eclipse June 15, 1992

- Partial eclipse
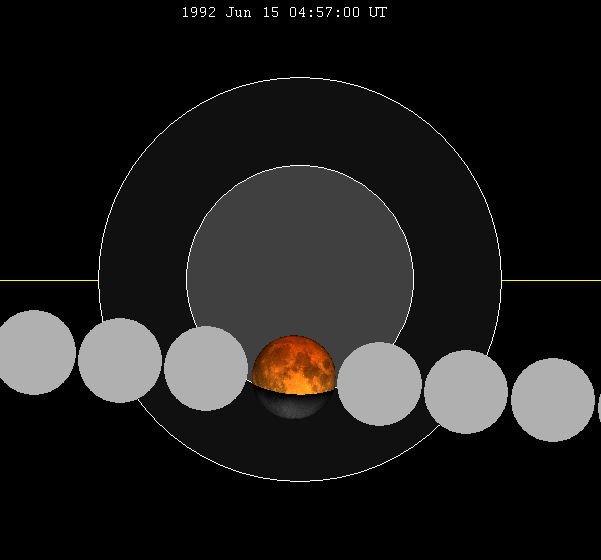
- The Moon's hourly motion shown right to left
- Date: June 15, 1992
- Gamma: −0.6289
- Magnitude: 0.6822
- Saros cycle: 120 (57 of 84)
- Partiality: 179 minutes, 47 seconds
- Penumbral: 332 minutes, 10 seconds
Contacts (UTC)
- P1: 2:10:54
- U1: 3:27:02
- Greatest: 4:56:58
- U4: 6:26:49
- P4: 7:43:04

A partial lunar eclipse occurred at the Moon’s ascending node of orbit on Monday, June 15, 1992, with an umbral magnitude of 0.6822. A lunar eclipse occurs when the Moon moves into the Earth's shadow, causing the Moon to be darkened. A partial lunar eclipse occurs when one part of the Moon is in the Earth's umbra, while the other part is in the Earth's penumbra. Unlike a solar eclipse, which can only be viewed from a relatively small area of the world, a lunar eclipse may be viewed from anywhere on the night side of Earth. Occurring about 4.75 days before apogee (on June 19, 1992, at 22:55 UTC), the Moon's apparent diameter was smaller.

== Visibility ==
The eclipse was completely visible over central and eastern North America, South America, and Antarctica, seen rising over western North America and the central Pacific Ocean and setting over western Europe and Africa.

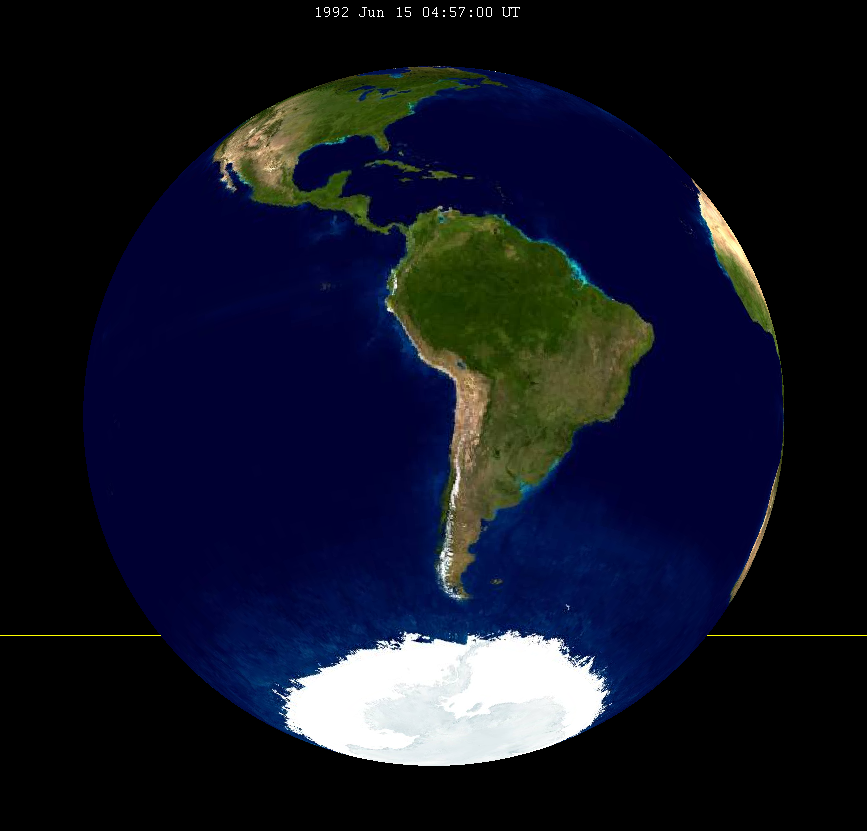
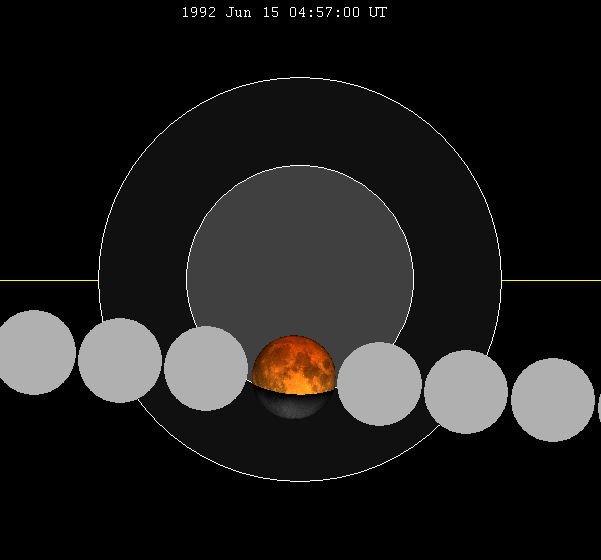

== Eclipse details ==
Shown below is a table displaying details about this particular lunar eclipse. It describes various parameters pertaining to this eclipse.

June 15, 1992 Lunar Eclipse Parameters
Parameter	Value
Penumbral Magnitude	1.72640
Umbral Magnitude	0.68220
Gamma	−0.62887
Sun Right Ascension	05h35m21.0s
Sun Declination	+23°19'09.1"
Sun Semi-Diameter	15'44.7"
Sun Equatorial Horizontal Parallax	08.7"
Moon Right Ascension	17h35m29.6s
Moon Declination	-23°53'53.6"
Moon Semi-Diameter	15'04.7"
Moon Equatorial Horizontal Parallax	0°55'20.3"
ΔT	58.7 s

== Eclipse season ==
This eclipse is part of an eclipse season, a period, roughly every six months, when eclipses occur. Only two (or occasionally three) eclipse seasons occur each year, and each season lasts about 35 days and repeats just short of six months (173 days) later; thus two full eclipse seasons always occur each year. Either two or three eclipses happen each eclipse season. In the sequence below, each eclipse is separated by a fortnight.

Eclipse season of June 1992
June 15 Ascending node (full moon)	June 30 Descending node (new moon)
Partial lunar eclipse Lunar Saros 120	Total solar eclipse Solar Saros 146

== Related eclipses ==
=== Eclipses in 1992 ===
- An annular solar eclipse on January 4.
- A partial lunar eclipse on June 15.
- A total solar eclipse on June 30.
- A total lunar eclipse on December 9.
- A partial solar eclipse on December 24.

=== Metonic ===
- Preceded by: Lunar eclipse of August 27, 1988
- Followed by: Lunar eclipse of April 4, 1996

=== Tzolkinex ===
- Preceded by: Lunar eclipse of May 4, 1985
- Followed by: Lunar eclipse of July 28, 1999

=== Half-Saros ===
- Preceded by: Solar eclipse of June 11, 1983
- Followed by: Solar eclipse of June 21, 2001

=== Tritos ===
- Preceded by: Lunar eclipse of July 17, 1981
- Followed by: Lunar eclipse of May 16, 2003

=== Lunar Saros 120 ===
- Preceded by: Lunar eclipse of June 4, 1974
- Followed by: Lunar eclipse of June 26, 2010

=== Inex ===
- Preceded by: Lunar eclipse of July 6, 1963
- Followed by: Lunar eclipse of May 26, 2021

=== Triad ===
- Preceded by: Lunar eclipse of August 15, 1905
- Followed by: Lunar eclipse of April 16, 2079

=== Lunar eclipses of 1991–1994 ===
This eclipse is a member of a semester series. An eclipse in a semester series of lunar eclipses repeats approximately every 177 days and 4 hours (a semester) at alternating nodes of the Moon's orbit.

The penumbral lunar eclipses on January 30, 1991 and July 26, 1991 occur in the previous lunar year eclipse set.

Lunar eclipse series sets from 1991 to 1994
Ascending node				Descending node			
Saros	Date Viewing	Type Chart	Gamma	Saros	Date Viewing	Type Chart	Gamma
110	1991 Jun 27	Penumbral	−1.4064	115	1991 Dec 21	Partial	0.9709
120	1992 Jun 15	Partial	−0.6289	125	1992 Dec 09	Total	0.3144
130	1993 Jun 04	Total	0.1638	135	1993 Nov 29	Total	−0.3994
140	1994 May 25	Partial	0.8933	145	1994 Nov 18	Penumbral	−1.1048

=== Saros 120 ===
This eclipse is a part of Saros series 120, repeating every 18 years, 11 days, and containing 83 events. The series started with a penumbral lunar eclipse on October 16, 1000. It contains partial eclipses from May 31, 1379 through August 4, 1487; total eclipses from August 14, 1505 through May 14, 1938; and a second set of partial eclipses from May 24, 1956 through July 28, 2064. The series ends at member 83 as a penumbral eclipse on April 7, 2479.

The longest duration of totality was produced by member 43 at 104 minutes, 55 seconds on January 24, 1758. All eclipses in this series occur at the Moon’s ascending node of orbit.

Greatest	First			
The greatest eclipse of the series occurred on 1758 Jan 24, lasting 104 minutes, 55 seconds.	Penumbral	Partial	Total	Central
The greatest eclipse of the series occurred on 1758 Jan 24, lasting 104 minutes, 55 seconds.	1000 Oct 16	1379 May 31	1505 Aug 14	1559 Sep 16
The greatest eclipse of the series occurred on 1758 Jan 24, lasting 104 minutes, 55 seconds.	Last			
The greatest eclipse of the series occurred on 1758 Jan 24, lasting 104 minutes, 55 seconds.	Central	Total	Partial	Penumbral
The greatest eclipse of the series occurred on 1758 Jan 24, lasting 104 minutes, 55 seconds.	1902 Apr 22	1938 May 14	2064 Jul 28	2479 Apr 07

Eclipses are tabulated in three columns; every third eclipse in the same column is one exeligmos apart, so they all cast shadows over approximately the same parts of the Earth.

Series members 46–67 occur between 1801 and 2200:
46	47	48
1812 Feb 27	1830 Mar 09	1848 Mar 19
49	50	51
1866 Mar 31	1884 Apr 10	1902 Apr 22
52	53	54
1920 May 03	1938 May 14	1956 May 24
55	56	57
1974 Jun 04	1992 Jun 15	2010 Jun 26
58	59	60
2028 Jul 06	2046 Jul 18	2064 Jul 28
61	62	63
2082 Aug 08	2100 Aug 19	2118 Aug 31
64	65	66
2136 Sep 10	2154 Sep 21	2172 Oct 02
67
2190 Oct 13

=== Tritos series ===
This eclipse is a part of a tritos cycle, repeating at alternating nodes every 135 synodic months (≈ 3986.63 days, or 11 years minus 1 month). Their appearance and longitude are irregular due to a lack of synchronization with the anomalistic month (period of perigee), but groupings of 3 tritos cycles (≈ 33 years minus 3 months) come close (≈ 434.044 anomalistic months), so eclipses are similar in these groupings.

Series members between 1801 and 2200
1806 Nov 26 (Saros 103)		1828 Sep 23 (Saros 105)	1839 Aug 24 (Saros 106)	1850 Jul 24 (Saros 107)
1861 Jun 22 (Saros 108)	1872 May 22 (Saros 109)	1883 Apr 22 (Saros 110)	1894 Mar 21 (Saros 111)	1905 Feb 19 (Saros 112)
1916 Jan 20 (Saros 113)	1926 Dec 19 (Saros 114)	1937 Nov 18 (Saros 115)	1948 Oct 18 (Saros 116)	1959 Sep 17 (Saros 117)
1970 Aug 17 (Saros 118)	1981 Jul 17 (Saros 119)	1992 Jun 15 (Saros 120)	2003 May 16 (Saros 121)	2014 Apr 15 (Saros 122)
2025 Mar 14 (Saros 123)	2036 Feb 11 (Saros 124)	2047 Jan 12 (Saros 125)	2057 Dec 11 (Saros 126)	2068 Nov 09 (Saros 127)
2079 Oct 10 (Saros 128)	2090 Sep 08 (Saros 129)	2101 Aug 09 (Saros 130)	2112 Jul 09 (Saros 131)	2123 Jun 09 (Saros 132)
2134 May 08 (Saros 133)	2145 Apr 07 (Saros 134)	2156 Mar 07 (Saros 135)	2167 Feb 04 (Saros 136)	2178 Jan 04 (Saros 137)
2188 Dec 04 (Saros 138)	2199 Nov 02 (Saros 139)			

=== Inex series ===
This eclipse is a part of the long period inex cycle, repeating at alternating nodes, every 358 synodic months (≈ 10,571.95 days, or 29 years minus 20 days). Their appearance and longitude are irregular due to a lack of synchronization with the anomalistic month (period of perigee). However, groupings of 3 inex cycles (≈ 87 years minus 2 months) comes close (≈ 1,151.02 anomalistic months), so eclipses are similar in these groupings.

Series members between 1801 and 2200
1818 Oct 14 (Saros 114)	1847 Sep 24 (Saros 115)	1876 Sep 03 (Saros 116)
1905 Aug 15 (Saros 117)	1934 Jul 26 (Saros 118)	1963 Jul 06 (Saros 119)
1992 Jun 15 (Saros 120)	2021 May 26 (Saros 121)	2050 May 06 (Saros 122)
2079 Apr 16 (Saros 123)	2108 Mar 27 (Saros 124)	2137 Mar 07 (Saros 125)
2166 Feb 15 (Saros 126)	2195 Jan 26 (Saros 127)	

=== Half-Saros cycle ===
A lunar eclipse will be preceded and followed by solar eclipses by 9 years and 5.5 days (a half saros). This lunar eclipse is related to two total solar eclipses of Solar Saros 127.

June 11, 1983	June 21, 2001

== See also ==
- List of lunar eclipses
- List of 20th-century lunar eclipses
