= June 1974 lunar eclipse =

Partial lunar eclipse

- Partial eclipse
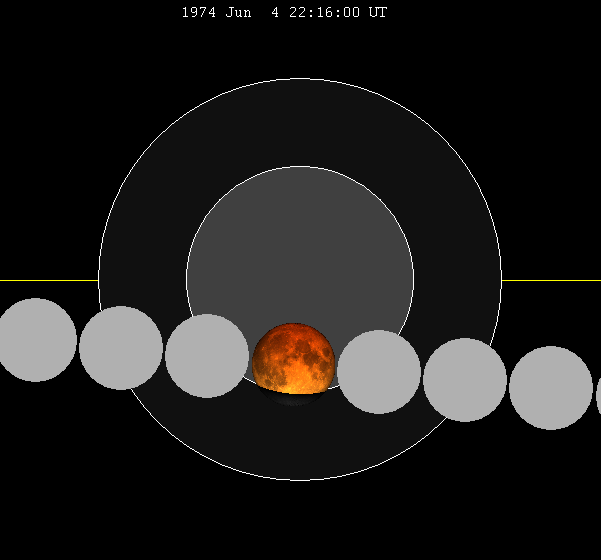
- The Moon's hourly motion shown right to left
- Date: June 4, 1974
- Gamma: −0.5489
- Magnitude: 0.8270
- Saros cycle: 120 (56 of 84)
- Partiality: 193 minutes, 35 seconds
- Penumbral: 341 minutes, 3 seconds
Contacts (UTC)
- P1: 19:25:29
- U1: 20:39:09
- Greatest: 22:15:59
- U4: 23:52:44
- P4: 1:06:32

A partial lunar eclipse occurred at the Moon’s ascending node of orbit on Tuesday, June 4, 1974, with an umbral magnitude of 0.8270. A lunar eclipse occurs when the Moon moves into the Earth's shadow, causing the Moon to be darkened. A partial lunar eclipse occurs when one part of the Moon is in the Earth's umbra, while the other part is in the Earth's penumbra. Unlike a solar eclipse, which can only be viewed from a relatively small area of the world, a lunar eclipse may be viewed from anywhere on the night side of Earth. Occurring about 4.5 days before apogee (on June 9, 1974, at 10:35 UTC), the Moon's apparent diameter was smaller.

== Visibility ==
The eclipse was completely visible over Africa, much of Europe, the Middle East, and Antarctica, seen rising over eastern North America, South America, and western Europe and setting over much of Asia and Australia.

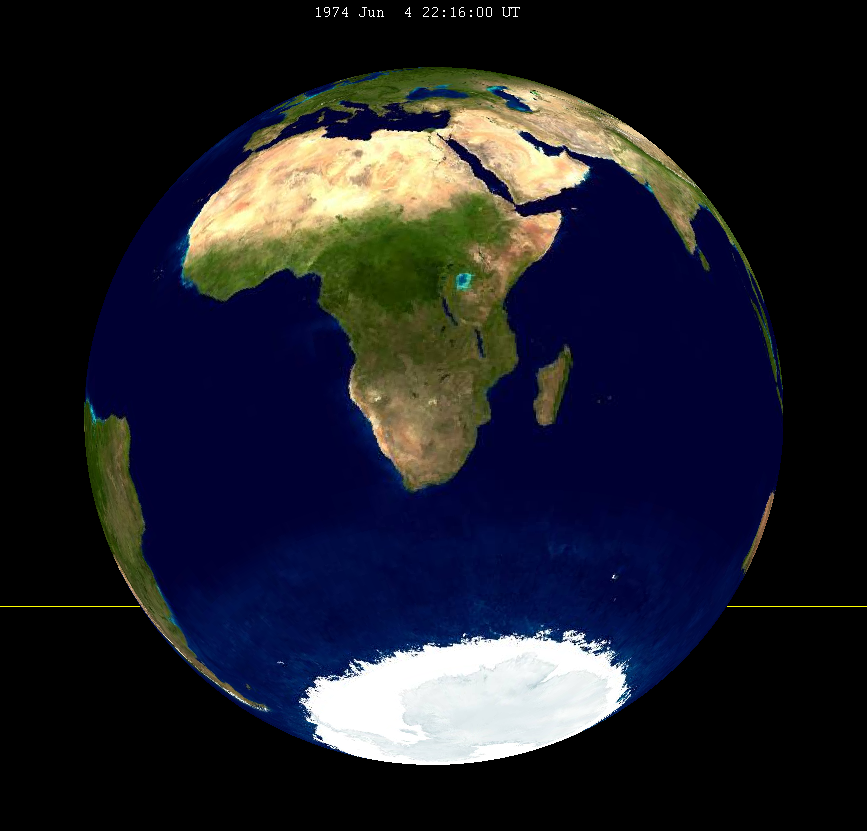
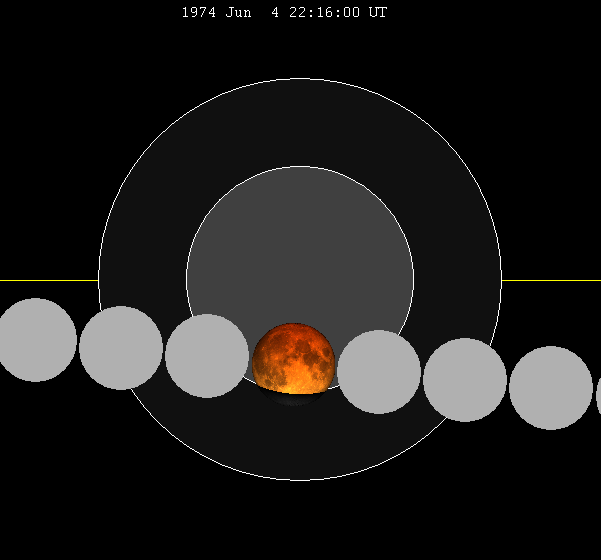

== Eclipse details ==
Shown below is a table displaying details about this particular solar eclipse. It describes various parameters pertaining to this eclipse.

June 4, 1974 Lunar Eclipse Parameters
Parameter	Value
Penumbral Magnitude	1.87523
Umbral Magnitude	0.82695
Gamma	−0.54887
Sun Right Ascension	04h50m08.7s
Sun Declination	+22°28'16.1"
Sun Semi-Diameter	15'45.8"
Sun Equatorial Horizontal Parallax	08.7"
Moon Right Ascension	16h50m06.0s
Moon Declination	-22°58'33.1"
Moon Semi-Diameter	15'02.3"
Moon Equatorial Horizontal Parallax	0°55'11.4"
ΔT	44.8 s

== Eclipse season ==
This eclipse is part of an eclipse season, a period, roughly every six months, when eclipses occur. Only two (or occasionally three) eclipse seasons occur each year, and each season lasts about 35 days and repeats just short of six months (173 days) later; thus two full eclipse seasons always occur each year. Either two or three eclipses happen each eclipse season. In the sequence below, each eclipse is separated by a fortnight.

Eclipse season of June 1974
June 4 Ascending node (full moon)	June 20 Descending node (new moon)
Partial lunar eclipse Lunar Saros 120	Total solar eclipse Solar Saros 146

== Related eclipses ==
=== Eclipses in 1974 ===
- A partial lunar eclipse on June 4.
- A total solar eclipse on June 20.
- A total lunar eclipse on November 29.
- A partial solar eclipse on December 13.

=== Metonic ===
- Preceded by: Lunar eclipse of August 17, 1970
- Followed by: Lunar eclipse of March 24, 1978

=== Tzolkinex ===
- Preceded by: Lunar eclipse of April 24, 1967
- Followed by: Lunar eclipse of July 17, 1981

=== Half-Saros ===
- Preceded by: Solar eclipse of May 30, 1965
- Followed by: Solar eclipse of June 11, 1983

=== Tritos ===
- Preceded by: Lunar eclipse of July 6, 1963
- Followed by: Lunar eclipse of May 4, 1985

=== Lunar Saros 120 ===
- Preceded by: Lunar eclipse of May 24, 1956
- Followed by: Lunar eclipse of June 15, 1992

=== Inex ===
- Preceded by: Lunar eclipse of June 25, 1945
- Followed by: Lunar eclipse of May 16, 2003

=== Triad ===
- Preceded by: Lunar eclipse of August 3, 1887
- Followed by: Lunar eclipse of April 4, 2061

=== Lunar eclipses of 1973–1976 ===
This eclipse is a member of a semester series. An eclipse in a semester series of lunar eclipses repeats approximately every 177 days and 4 hours (a semester) at alternating nodes of the Moon's orbit.

The penumbral lunar eclipses on January 18, 1973 and July 15, 1973 occur in the previous lunar year eclipse set.

Lunar eclipse series sets from 1973 to 1976
Ascending node				Descending node			
Saros	Date Viewing	Type Chart	Gamma	Saros	Date Viewing	Type Chart	Gamma
110	1973 Jun 15	Penumbral	−1.3217	115	1973 Dec 10	Partial	0.9644
120	1974 Jun 04	Partial	−0.5489	125	1974 Nov 29	Total	0.3054
130	1975 May 25	Total	0.2367	135	1975 Nov 18	Total	−0.4134
140	1976 May 13	Partial	0.9586	145	1976 Nov 06	Penumbral	−1.1276

=== Saros 120 ===
This eclipse is a part of Saros series 120, repeating every 18 years, 11 days, and containing 83 events. The series started with a penumbral lunar eclipse on October 16, 1000. It contains partial eclipses from May 31, 1379 through August 4, 1487; total eclipses from August 14, 1505 through May 14, 1938; and a second set of partial eclipses from May 24, 1956 through July 28, 2064. The series ends at member 83 as a penumbral eclipse on April 7, 2479.

The longest duration of totality was produced by member 43 at 104 minutes, 55 seconds on January 24, 1758. All eclipses in this series occur at the Moon’s ascending node of orbit.

Greatest	First			
The greatest eclipse of the series occurred on 1758 Jan 24, lasting 104 minutes, 55 seconds.	Penumbral	Partial	Total	Central
The greatest eclipse of the series occurred on 1758 Jan 24, lasting 104 minutes, 55 seconds.	1000 Oct 16	1379 May 31	1505 Aug 14	1559 Sep 16
The greatest eclipse of the series occurred on 1758 Jan 24, lasting 104 minutes, 55 seconds.	Last			
The greatest eclipse of the series occurred on 1758 Jan 24, lasting 104 minutes, 55 seconds.	Central	Total	Partial	Penumbral
The greatest eclipse of the series occurred on 1758 Jan 24, lasting 104 minutes, 55 seconds.	1902 Apr 22	1938 May 14	2064 Jul 28	2479 Apr 07

Eclipses are tabulated in three columns; every third eclipse in the same column is one exeligmos apart, so they all cast shadows over approximately the same parts of the Earth.

Series members 46–67 occur between 1801 and 2200:
46	47	48
1812 Feb 27	1830 Mar 09	1848 Mar 19
49	50	51
1866 Mar 31	1884 Apr 10	1902 Apr 22
52	53	54
1920 May 03	1938 May 14	1956 May 24
55	56	57
1974 Jun 04	1992 Jun 15	2010 Jun 26
58	59	60
2028 Jul 06	2046 Jul 18	2064 Jul 28
61	62	63
2082 Aug 08	2100 Aug 19	2118 Aug 31
64	65	66
2136 Sep 10	2154 Sep 21	2172 Oct 02
67
2190 Oct 13

=== Tritos series ===
This eclipse is a part of a tritos cycle, repeating at alternating nodes every 135 synodic months (≈ 3986.63 days, or 11 years minus 1 month). Their appearance and longitude are irregular due to a lack of synchronization with the anomalistic month (period of perigee), but groupings of 3 tritos cycles (≈ 33 years minus 3 months) come close (≈ 434.044 anomalistic months), so eclipses are similar in these groupings.

Series members between 1801 and 2200
1810 Sep 13 (Saros 105)	1821 Aug 13 (Saros 106)	1832 Jul 12 (Saros 107)	1843 Jun 12 (Saros 108)	1854 May 12 (Saros 109)
1865 Apr 11 (Saros 110)	1876 Mar 10 (Saros 111)	1887 Feb 08 (Saros 112)	1898 Jan 08 (Saros 113)	1908 Dec 07 (Saros 114)
1919 Nov 07 (Saros 115)	1930 Oct 07 (Saros 116)	1941 Sep 05 (Saros 117)	1952 Aug 05 (Saros 118)	1963 Jul 06 (Saros 119)
1974 Jun 04 (Saros 120)	1985 May 04 (Saros 121)	1996 Apr 04 (Saros 122)	2007 Mar 03 (Saros 123)	2018 Jan 31 (Saros 124)
2028 Dec 31 (Saros 125)	2039 Nov 30 (Saros 126)	2050 Oct 30 (Saros 127)	2061 Sep 29 (Saros 128)	2072 Aug 28 (Saros 129)
2083 Jul 29 (Saros 130)	2094 Jun 28 (Saros 131)	2105 May 28 (Saros 132)	2116 Apr 27 (Saros 133)	2127 Mar 28 (Saros 134)
2138 Feb 24 (Saros 135)	2149 Jan 23 (Saros 136)	2159 Dec 24 (Saros 137)	2170 Nov 23 (Saros 138)	2181 Oct 22 (Saros 139)
2192 Sep 21 (Saros 140)

=== Inex series ===
This eclipse is a part of the long period inex cycle, repeating at alternating nodes, every 358 synodic months (≈ 10,571.95 days, or 29 years minus 20 days). Their appearance and longitude are irregular due to a lack of synchronization with the anomalistic month (period of perigee). However, groupings of 3 inex cycles (≈ 87 years minus 2 months) comes close (≈ 1,151.02 anomalistic months), so eclipses are similar in these groupings.

Series members between 1801 and 2200
1829 Sep 13 (Saros 115)	1858 Aug 24 (Saros 116)	1887 Aug 03 (Saros 117)
1916 Jul 15 (Saros 118)	1945 Jun 25 (Saros 119)	1974 Jun 04 (Saros 120)
2003 May 16 (Saros 121)	2032 Apr 25 (Saros 122)	2061 Apr 04 (Saros 123)
2090 Mar 15 (Saros 124)	2119 Feb 25 (Saros 125)	2148 Feb 04 (Saros 126)
2177 Jan 14 (Saros 127)

=== Half-Saros cycle ===
A lunar eclipse will be preceded and followed by solar eclipses by 9 years and 5.5 days (a half saros). This lunar eclipse is related to two total solar eclipses of Solar Saros 127.

May 30, 1965	June 11, 1983

== See also ==
- List of lunar eclipses
- List of 20th-century lunar eclipses
