= May 1938 lunar eclipse =

Total lunar eclipse May 14, 1938

- Total eclipse
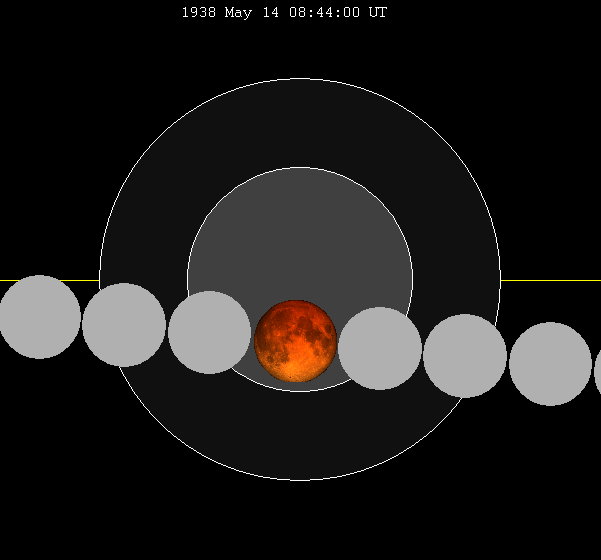
- The Moon's hourly motion shown right to left
- Date: May 14, 1938
- Gamma: −0.3994
- Magnitude: 1.0966
- Saros cycle: 120 (54 of 84)
- Totality: 49 minutes, 22 seconds
- Partiality: 213 minutes, 3 seconds
- Penumbral: 354 minutes, 52 seconds
Contacts (UTC)
- P1: 5:46:12
- U1: 6:57:03
- U2: 8:18:54
- Greatest: 8:43:36
- U3: 9:08:16
- U4: 10:30:06
- P4: 11:41:04

A total lunar eclipse occurred at the Moon’s ascending node of orbit on Saturday, May 14, 1938, with an umbral magnitude of 1.0966. A lunar eclipse occurs when the Moon moves into the Earth's shadow, causing the Moon to be darkened. A total lunar eclipse occurs when the Moon's near side entirely passes into the Earth's umbral shadow. Unlike a solar eclipse, which can only be viewed from a relatively small area of the world, a lunar eclipse may be viewed from anywhere on the night side of Earth. A total lunar eclipse can last up to nearly two hours, while a total solar eclipse lasts only a few minutes at any given place, because the Moon's shadow is smaller. Occurring about 4.1 days before apogee (on May 18, 1938, at 9:40 UTC), the Moon's apparent diameter was smaller.

This lunar eclipse was the first of an almost tetrad, with the others being on November 7, 1938 (total); May 3, 1939 (total); and October 28, 1939 (partial).

This was the last total lunar eclipse of Lunar Saros 120.

== Visibility ==
The eclipse was completely visible over western North America, Antarctica, and the eastern Pacific Ocean, seen rising over east Asia and Australia and setting over eastern North America, South America, and west Africa.

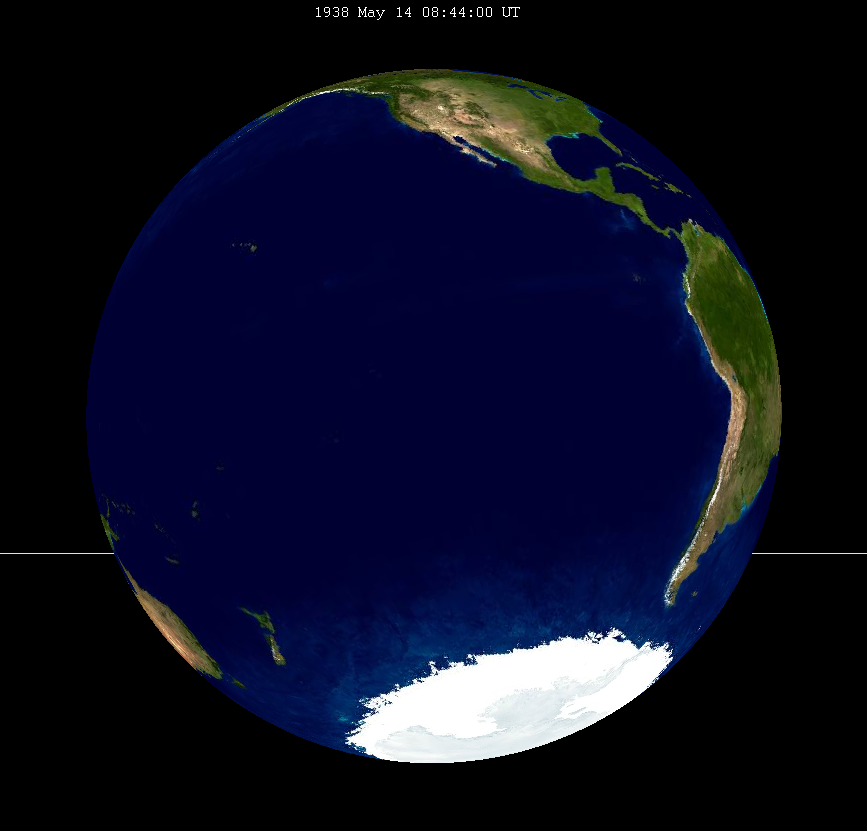
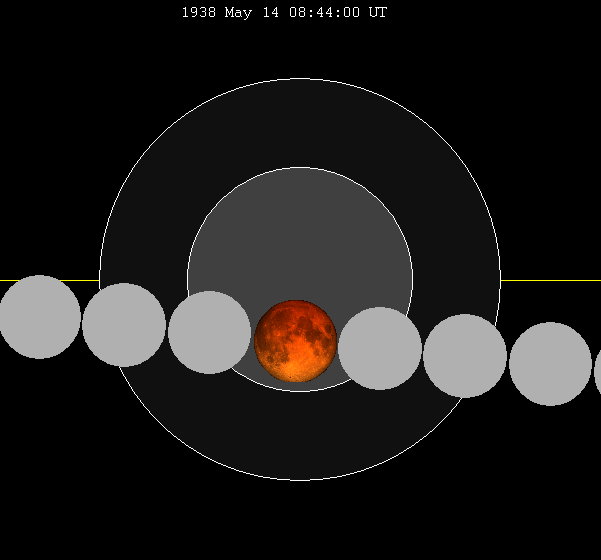

== Eclipse details ==
Shown below is a table displaying details about this particular lunar eclipse. It describes various parameters pertaining to this eclipse.

May 14, 1938 Lunar Eclipse Parameters
Parameter	Value
Penumbral Magnitude	2.15402
Umbral Magnitude	1.09660
Gamma	−0.39944
Sun Right Ascension	03h21m58.6s
Sun Declination	+18°30'04.2"
Sun Semi-Diameter	15'49.4"
Sun Equatorial Horizontal Parallax	08.7"
Moon Right Ascension	15h21m44.2s
Moon Declination	-18°51'44.3"
Moon Semi-Diameter	14'57.8"
Moon Equatorial Horizontal Parallax	0°54'55.0"
ΔT	24.0 s

== Eclipse season ==
This eclipse is part of an eclipse season, a period, roughly every six months, when eclipses occur. Only two (or occasionally three) eclipse seasons occur each year, and each season lasts about 35 days and repeats just short of six months (173 days) later; thus two full eclipse seasons always occur each year. Either two or three eclipses happen each eclipse season. In the sequence below, each eclipse is separated by a fortnight.

Eclipse season of May 1938
May 14 Ascending node (full moon)	May 29 Descending node (new moon)
Total lunar eclipse Lunar Saros 120	Total solar eclipse Solar Saros 146

== Related eclipses ==
=== Eclipses in 1938 ===
- A total lunar eclipse on May 14.
- A total solar eclipse on May 29.
- A total lunar eclipse on November 7.
- A partial solar eclipse on November 21.

=== Metonic ===
- Preceded by: Lunar eclipse of July 26, 1934
- Followed by: Lunar eclipse of March 3, 1942

=== Tzolkinex ===
- Preceded by: Lunar eclipse of April 2, 1931
- Followed by: Lunar eclipse of June 25, 1945

=== Half-Saros ===
- Preceded by: Solar eclipse of May 9, 1929
- Followed by: Solar eclipse of May 20, 1947

=== Tritos ===
- Preceded by: Lunar eclipse of June 15, 1927
- Followed by: Lunar eclipse of April 13, 1949

=== Lunar Saros 120 ===
- Preceded by: Lunar eclipse of May 3, 1920
- Followed by: Lunar eclipse of May 24, 1956

=== Inex ===
- Preceded by: Lunar eclipse of June 4, 1909
- Followed by: Lunar eclipse of April 24, 1967

=== Triad ===
- Preceded by: Lunar eclipse of July 13, 1851
- Followed by: Lunar eclipse of March 14, 2025

=== Lunar eclipses of 1937–1940 ===
This eclipse is a member of a semester series. An eclipse in a semester series of lunar eclipses repeats approximately every 177 days and 4 hours (a semester) at alternating nodes of the Moon's orbit.

The penumbral lunar eclipse on March 23, 1940 occurs in the next lunar year eclipse set.

Lunar eclipse series sets from 1937 to 1940
Ascending node				Descending node			
Saros	Date Viewing	Type Chart	Gamma	Saros	Date Viewing	Type Chart	Gamma
110	1937 May 25	Penumbral	−1.1582	115	1937 Nov 18	Partial	0.9421
120	1938 May 14	Total	−0.3994	125	1938 Nov 07	Total	0.2739
130	1939 May 03	Total	0.3693	135	1939 Oct 28	Partial	−0.4581
140	1940 Apr 22	Penumbral	1.0741	145	1940 Oct 16	Penumbral	−1.1925

=== Saros 120 ===
This eclipse is a part of Saros series 120, repeating every 18 years, 11 days, and containing 83 events. The series started with a penumbral lunar eclipse on October 16, 1000. It contains partial eclipses from May 31, 1379 through August 4, 1487; total eclipses from August 14, 1505 through May 14, 1938; and a second set of partial eclipses from May 24, 1956 through July 28, 2064. The series ends at member 83 as a penumbral eclipse on April 7, 2479.

The longest duration of totality was produced by member 43 at 104 minutes, 55 seconds on January 24, 1758. All eclipses in this series occur at the Moon’s ascending node of orbit.

Greatest	First			
The greatest eclipse of the series occurred on 1758 Jan 24, lasting 104 minutes, 55 seconds.	Penumbral	Partial	Total	Central
The greatest eclipse of the series occurred on 1758 Jan 24, lasting 104 minutes, 55 seconds.	1000 Oct 16	1379 May 31	1505 Aug 14	1559 Sep 16
The greatest eclipse of the series occurred on 1758 Jan 24, lasting 104 minutes, 55 seconds.	Last			
The greatest eclipse of the series occurred on 1758 Jan 24, lasting 104 minutes, 55 seconds.	Central	Total	Partial	Penumbral
The greatest eclipse of the series occurred on 1758 Jan 24, lasting 104 minutes, 55 seconds.	1902 Apr 22	1938 May 14	2064 Jul 28	2479 Apr 07

Eclipses are tabulated in three columns; every third eclipse in the same column is one exeligmos apart, so they all cast shadows over approximately the same parts of the Earth.

Series members 46–67 occur between 1801 and 2200:
46	47	48
1812 Feb 27	1830 Mar 09	1848 Mar 19
49	50	51
1866 Mar 31	1884 Apr 10	1902 Apr 22
52	53	54
1920 May 03	1938 May 14	1956 May 24
55	56	57
1974 Jun 04	1992 Jun 15	2010 Jun 26
58	59	60
2028 Jul 06	2046 Jul 18	2064 Jul 28
61	62	63
2082 Aug 08	2100 Aug 19	2118 Aug 31
64	65	66
2136 Sep 10	2154 Sep 21	2172 Oct 02
67
2190 Oct 13

=== Tritos series ===
This eclipse is a part of a tritos cycle, repeating at alternating nodes every 135 synodic months (≈ 3986.63 days, or 11 years minus 1 month). Their appearance and longitude are irregular due to a lack of synchronization with the anomalistic month (period of perigee), but groupings of 3 tritos cycles (≈ 33 years minus 3 months) come close (≈ 434.044 anomalistic months), so eclipses are similar in these groupings.

Series members between 1801 and 2200
1807 May 21 (Saros 108)	1818 Apr 21 (Saros 109)	1829 Mar 20 (Saros 110)	1840 Feb 17 (Saros 111)	1851 Jan 17 (Saros 112)
1861 Dec 17 (Saros 113)	1872 Nov 15 (Saros 114)	1883 Oct 16 (Saros 115)	1894 Sep 15 (Saros 116)	1905 Aug 15 (Saros 117)
1916 Jul 15 (Saros 118)	1927 Jun 15 (Saros 119)	1938 May 14 (Saros 120)	1949 Apr 13 (Saros 121)	1960 Mar 13 (Saros 122)
1971 Feb 10 (Saros 123)	1982 Jan 09 (Saros 124)	1992 Dec 09 (Saros 125)	2003 Nov 09 (Saros 126)	2014 Oct 08 (Saros 127)
2025 Sep 07 (Saros 128)	2036 Aug 07 (Saros 129)	2047 Jul 07 (Saros 130)	2058 Jun 06 (Saros 131)	2069 May 06 (Saros 132)
2080 Apr 04 (Saros 133)	2091 Mar 05 (Saros 134)	2102 Feb 03 (Saros 135)	2113 Jan 02 (Saros 136)	2123 Dec 03 (Saros 137)
2134 Nov 02 (Saros 138)	2145 Sep 30 (Saros 139)	2156 Aug 30 (Saros 140)	2167 Aug 01 (Saros 141)	2178 Jun 30 (Saros 142)
2189 May 29 (Saros 143)	2200 Apr 30 (Saros 144)			

=== Inex series ===
This eclipse is a part of the long period inex cycle, repeating at alternating nodes, every 358 synodic months (≈ 10,571.95 days, or 29 years minus 20 days). Their appearance and longitude are irregular due to a lack of synchronization with the anomalistic month (period of perigee). However, groupings of 3 inex cycles (≈ 87 years minus 2 months) comes close (≈ 1,151.02 anomalistic months), so eclipses are similar in these groupings.

Series members between 1801 and 2200
1822 Aug 03 (Saros 116)	1851 Jul 13 (Saros 117)	1880 Jun 22 (Saros 118)
1909 Jun 04 (Saros 119)	1938 May 14 (Saros 120)	1967 Apr 24 (Saros 121)
1996 Apr 04 (Saros 122)	2025 Mar 14 (Saros 123)	2054 Feb 22 (Saros 124)
2083 Feb 02 (Saros 125)	2112 Jan 14 (Saros 126)	2140 Dec 23 (Saros 127)
2169 Dec 04 (Saros 128)	2198 Nov 13 (Saros 129)	

=== Half-Saros cycle ===
A lunar eclipse will be preceded and followed by solar eclipses by 9 years and 5.5 days (a half saros). This lunar eclipse is related to two total solar eclipses of Solar Saros 127.

May 9, 1929	May 20, 1947

== See also ==
- List of lunar eclipses
- List of 20th-century lunar eclipses
