= July 2028 lunar eclipse =

Astronomical event

- Partial eclipse
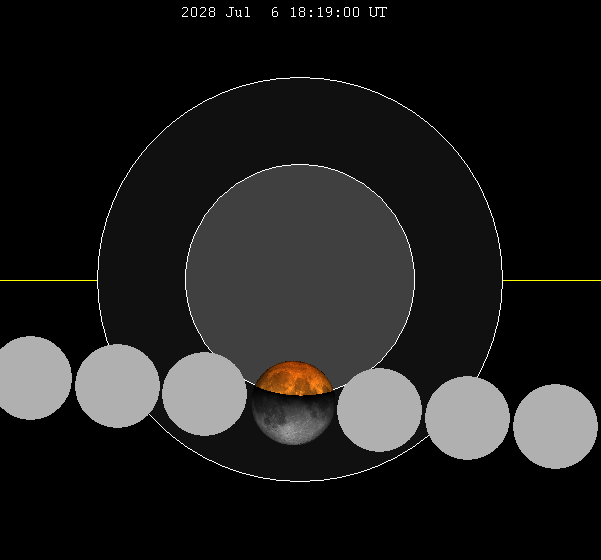
- The Moon's hourly motion shown right to left
- Date: July 6, 2028
- Gamma: −0.7904
- Magnitude: 0.3908
- Saros cycle: 120 (59 of 84)
- Partiality: 141 minutes, 30 seconds
- Penumbral: 310 minutes, 38 seconds
Contacts (UTC)
- P1: 15:44:21
- U1: 17:08:51
- Greatest: 18:19:41
- U4: 19:30:21
- P4: 20:54:59

A partial lunar eclipse will occur at the Moon’s ascending node of orbit on Thursday, July 6, 2028, with an umbral magnitude of 0.3908. A lunar eclipse occurs when the Moon moves into the Earth's shadow, causing the Moon to be darkened. A partial lunar eclipse occurs when one part of the Moon is in the Earth's umbra, while the other part is in the Earth's penumbra. Unlike a solar eclipse, which can only be viewed from a relatively small area of the world, a lunar eclipse may be viewed from anywhere on the night side of Earth. Occurring about 4 days before apogee (on July 11, 2028, at 18:25 UTC), the Moon's apparent diameter will be smaller.

== Visibility ==
The eclipse will be completely visible over east Africa, Asia, Antarctica, and Australia, seen rising over west and central Africa and Europe and setting over the central Pacific Ocean.

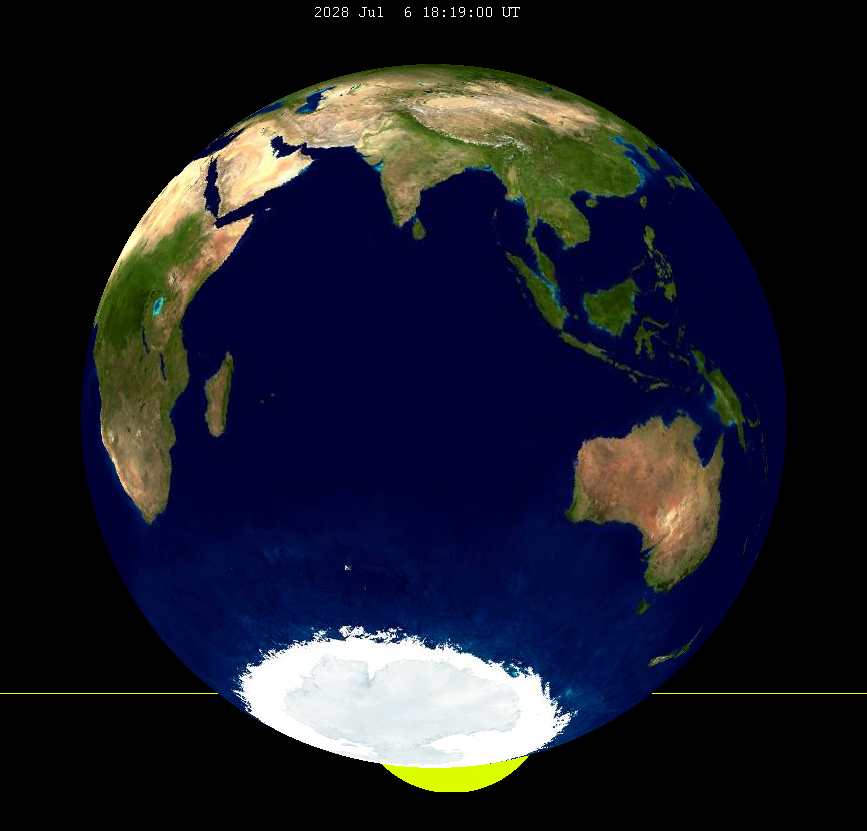
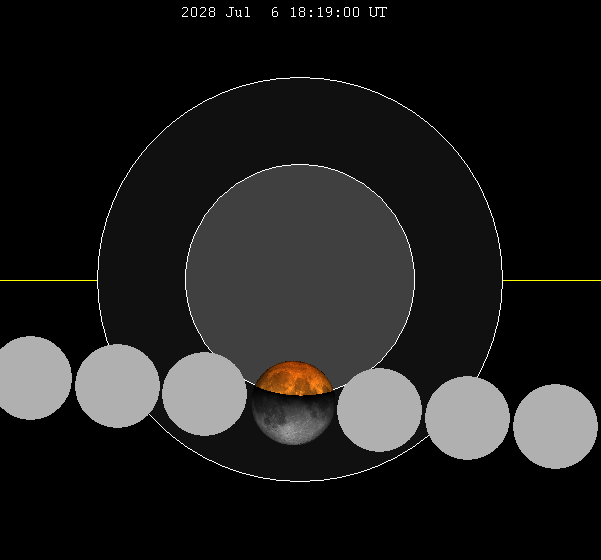

== Eclipse details ==
Shown below is a table displaying details about this particular lunar eclipse. It describes various parameters pertaining to this eclipse.

July 6, 2028 Lunar Eclipse Parameters
Parameter	Value
Penumbral Magnitude	1.42819
Umbral Magnitude	0.39083
Gamma	−0.79040
Sun Right Ascension	07h05m56.7s
Sun Declination	+22°34'16.5"
Sun Semi-Diameter	15'43.9"
Sun Equatorial Horizontal Parallax	08.6"
Moon Right Ascension	19h06m37.0s
Moon Declination	-23°17'16.4"
Moon Semi-Diameter	15'09.9"
Moon Equatorial Horizontal Parallax	0°55'39.4"
ΔT	73.2 s

== Eclipse season ==
This eclipse is part of an eclipse season, a period, roughly every six months, when eclipses occur. Only two (or occasionally three) eclipse seasons occur each year, and each season lasts about 35 days and repeats just short of six months (173 days) later; thus two full eclipse seasons always occur each year. Either two or three eclipses happen each eclipse season. In the sequence below, each eclipse is separated by a fortnight.

Eclipse season of July 2028
July 6 Ascending node (full moon)	July 22 Descending node (new moon)
Partial lunar eclipse Lunar Saros 120	Total solar eclipse Solar Saros 146

== Related eclipses ==
=== Eclipses in 2028 ===
- A partial lunar eclipse on January 12.
- An annular solar eclipse on January 26.
- A partial lunar eclipse on July 6.
- A total solar eclipse on July 22.
- A total lunar eclipse on December 31.

=== Metonic ===
- Preceded by: Lunar eclipse of September 18, 2024
- Followed by: Lunar eclipse of April 25, 2032

=== Tzolkinex ===
- Preceded by: Lunar eclipse of May 26, 2021
- Followed by: Lunar eclipse of August 19, 2035

=== Half-Saros ===
- Preceded by: Solar eclipse of July 2, 2019
- Followed by: Solar eclipse of July 13, 2037

=== Tritos ===
- Preceded by: Lunar eclipse of August 7, 2017
- Followed by: Lunar eclipse of June 6, 2039

=== Lunar Saros 120 ===
- Preceded by: Lunar eclipse of June 26, 2010
- Followed by: Lunar eclipse of July 18, 2046

=== Inex ===
- Preceded by: Lunar eclipse of July 28, 1999
- Followed by: Lunar eclipse of June 17, 2057

=== Triad ===
- Preceded by: Lunar eclipse of September 5, 1941
- Followed by: Lunar eclipse of May 8, 2115

=== Lunar eclipses of 2027–2031 ===
This eclipse is a member of a semester series. An eclipse in a semester series of lunar eclipses repeats approximately every 177 days and 4 hours (a semester) at alternating nodes of the Moon's orbit.

The penumbral lunar eclipses on February 20, 2027 and August 17, 2027 occur in the previous lunar year eclipse set, and the penumbral lunar eclipses on May 7, 2031 and October 30, 2031 occur in the next lunar year eclipse set.

Lunar eclipse series sets from 2027 to 2031
Ascending node				Descending node			
Saros	Date Viewing	Type Chart	Gamma	Saros	Date Viewing	Type Chart	Gamma
110	2027 Jul 18	Penumbral	−1.5759	115	2028 Jan 12	Partial	0.9818
120	2028 Jul 06	Partial	−0.7904	125	2028 Dec 31	Total	0.3258
130	2029 Jun 26	Total	0.0124	135	2029 Dec 20	Total	−0.3811
140	2030 Jun 15	Partial	0.7535	145	2030 Dec 09	Penumbral	−1.0732
150	2031 Jun 05	Penumbral	1.4732				

=== Saros 120 ===
This eclipse is a part of Saros series 120, repeating every 18 years, 11 days, and containing 83 events. The series started with a penumbral lunar eclipse on October 16, 1000. It contains partial eclipses from May 31, 1379 through August 4, 1487; total eclipses from August 14, 1505 through May 14, 1938; and a second set of partial eclipses from May 24, 1956 through July 28, 2064. The series ends at member 83 as a penumbral eclipse on April 7, 2479.

The longest duration of totality was produced by member 43 at 104 minutes, 55 seconds on January 24, 1758. All eclipses in this series occur at the Moon’s ascending node of orbit.

Greatest	First			
The greatest eclipse of the series occurred on 1758 Jan 24, lasting 104 minutes, 55 seconds.	Penumbral	Partial	Total	Central
The greatest eclipse of the series occurred on 1758 Jan 24, lasting 104 minutes, 55 seconds.	1000 Oct 16	1379 May 31	1505 Aug 14	1559 Sep 16
The greatest eclipse of the series occurred on 1758 Jan 24, lasting 104 minutes, 55 seconds.	Last			
The greatest eclipse of the series occurred on 1758 Jan 24, lasting 104 minutes, 55 seconds.	Central	Total	Partial	Penumbral
The greatest eclipse of the series occurred on 1758 Jan 24, lasting 104 minutes, 55 seconds.	1902 Apr 22	1938 May 14	2064 Jul 28	2479 Apr 07

Eclipses are tabulated in three columns; every third eclipse in the same column is one exeligmos apart, so they all cast shadows over approximately the same parts of the Earth.

Series members 46–67 occur between 1801 and 2200:
46	47	48
1812 Feb 27	1830 Mar 09	1848 Mar 19
49	50	51
1866 Mar 31	1884 Apr 10	1902 Apr 22
52	53	54
1920 May 03	1938 May 14	1956 May 24
55	56	57
1974 Jun 04	1992 Jun 15	2010 Jun 26
58	59	60
2028 Jul 06	2046 Jul 18	2064 Jul 28
61	62	63
2082 Aug 08	2100 Aug 19	2118 Aug 31
64	65	66
2136 Sep 10	2154 Sep 21	2172 Oct 02
67
2190 Oct 13

=== Tritos series ===
This eclipse is a part of a tritos cycle, repeating at alternating nodes every 135 synodic months (≈ 3986.63 days, or 11 years minus 1 month). Their appearance and longitude are irregular due to a lack of synchronization with the anomalistic month (period of perigee), but groupings of 3 tritos cycles (≈ 33 years minus 3 months) come close (≈ 434.044 anomalistic months), so eclipses are similar in these groupings.

Series members between 1801 and 2200
1810 Mar 21 (Saros 100)	1821 Feb 17 (Saros 101)	1832 Jan 17 (Saros 102)	1842 Dec 17 (Saros 103)	
1864 Oct 15 (Saros 105)	1875 Sep 15 (Saros 106)	1886 Aug 14 (Saros 107)	1897 Jul 14 (Saros 108)	1908 Jun 14 (Saros 109)
1919 May 15 (Saros 110)	1930 Apr 13 (Saros 111)	1941 Mar 13 (Saros 112)	1952 Feb 11 (Saros 113)	1963 Jan 09 (Saros 114)
1973 Dec 10 (Saros 115)	1984 Nov 08 (Saros 116)	1995 Oct 08 (Saros 117)	2006 Sep 07 (Saros 118)	2017 Aug 07 (Saros 119)
2028 Jul 06 (Saros 120)	2039 Jun 06 (Saros 121)	2050 May 06 (Saros 122)	2061 Apr 04 (Saros 123)	2072 Mar 04 (Saros 124)
2083 Feb 02 (Saros 125)	2094 Jan 01 (Saros 126)	2104 Dec 02 (Saros 127)	2115 Nov 02 (Saros 128)	2126 Oct 01 (Saros 129)
2137 Aug 30 (Saros 130)	2148 Jul 31 (Saros 131)	2159 Jun 30 (Saros 132)	2170 May 30 (Saros 133)	2181 Apr 29 (Saros 134)
2192 Mar 28 (Saros 135)

=== Inex series ===
This eclipse is a part of the long period inex cycle, repeating at alternating nodes, every 358 synodic months (≈ 10,571.95 days, or 29 years minus 20 days). Their appearance and longitude are irregular due to a lack of synchronization with the anomalistic month (period of perigee). However, groupings of 3 inex cycles (≈ 87 years minus 2 months) comes close (≈ 1,151.02 anomalistic months), so eclipses are similar in these groupings.

Series members between 1801 and 2200
1825 Nov 25 (Saros 113)	1854 Nov 04 (Saros 114)	1883 Oct 16 (Saros 115)
1912 Sep 26 (Saros 116)	1941 Sep 05 (Saros 117)	1970 Aug 17 (Saros 118)
1999 Jul 28 (Saros 119)	2028 Jul 06 (Saros 120)	2057 Jun 17 (Saros 121)
2086 May 28 (Saros 122)	2115 May 08 (Saros 123)	2144 Apr 18 (Saros 124)
2173 Mar 29 (Saros 125)

=== Half-Saros cycle ===
A lunar eclipse will be preceded and followed by solar eclipses by 9 years and 5.5 days (a half saros). This lunar eclipse is related to two total solar eclipses of Solar Saros 127.

July 2, 2019	July 13, 2037

== See also ==
- List of lunar eclipses and List of 21st-century lunar eclipses
