= 1963 lunar eclipse =

Two lunar eclipses occurred in 1963:

- 6 July 1963 partial lunar eclipse
- 30 December 1963 total lunar eclipse

== See also ==
- List of 20th-century lunar eclipses
- Lists of lunar eclipses
