= May 1920 lunar eclipse =

Total lunar eclipse May 3, 1920

- Total eclipse
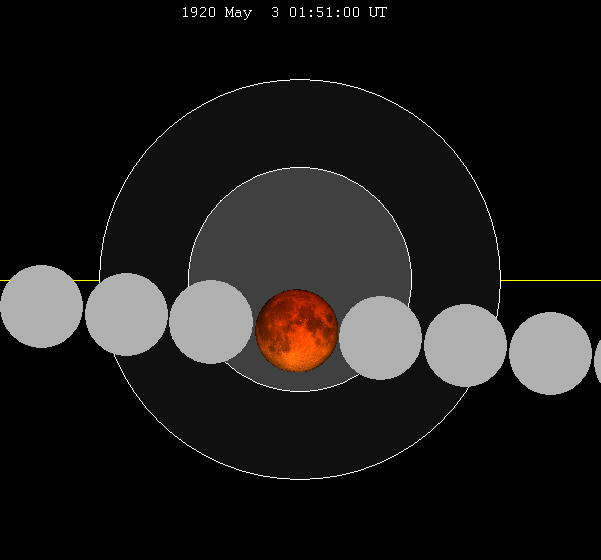
- The Moon's hourly motion shown right to left
- Date: May 3, 1920
- Gamma: −0.3312
- Magnitude: 1.2194
- Saros cycle: 120 (53 of 84)
- Totality: 71 minutes, 31 seconds
- Partiality: 219 minutes, 39 seconds
- Penumbral: 360 minutes, 4 seconds
Contacts (UTC)
- P1: 22:50:47
- U1: 0:00:56
- U2: 1:15:01
- Greatest: 1:50:47
- U3: 2:26:32
- U4: 3:40:36
- P4: 4:50:51

A total lunar eclipse occurred at the Moon’s ascending node of orbit on Monday, May 3, 1920, with an umbral magnitude of 1.2194. A lunar eclipse occurs when the Moon moves into the Earth's shadow, causing the Moon to be darkened. A total lunar eclipse occurs when the Moon's near side entirely passes into the Earth's umbral shadow. Unlike a solar eclipse, which can only be viewed from a relatively small area of the world, a lunar eclipse may be viewed from anywhere on the night side of Earth. A total lunar eclipse can last up to nearly two hours, while a total solar eclipse lasts only a few minutes at any given place, because the Moon's shadow is smaller. Occurring only about 3.8 days before apogee (on May 6, 1920, at 21:00 UTC), the Moon's apparent diameter was smaller.

This lunar eclipse was the first of an almost tetrad, with the others being on October 27, 1920 (total); April 22, 1921 (total); and October 16, 1921 (partial).

== Visibility ==
The eclipse was completely visible over South America, west and southern Africa, western Europe, and Antarctica, seen rising over much of North America and the eastern Pacific Ocean and setting over eastern Europe, east Africa, and the western half of Asia.

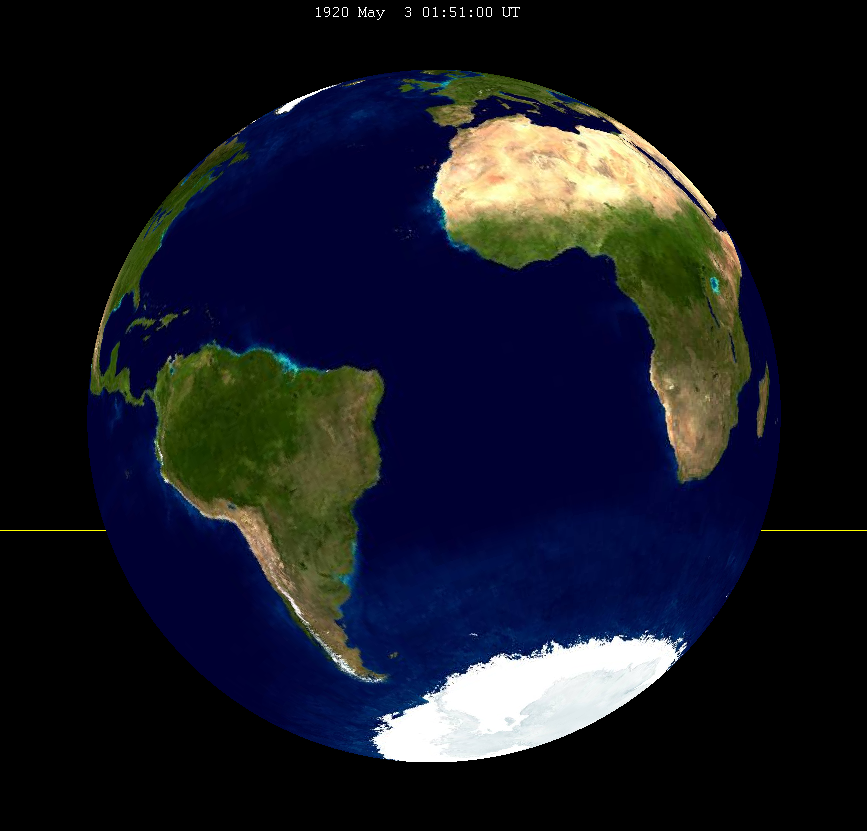
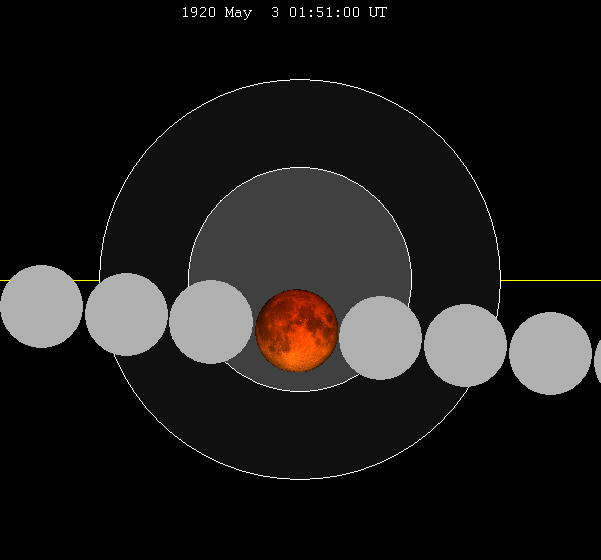

== Eclipse details ==
Shown below is a table displaying details about this particular solar eclipse. It describes various parameters pertaining to this eclipse.

May 3, 1920 Lunar Eclipse Parameters
Parameter	Value
Penumbral Magnitude	2.28178
Umbral Magnitude	1.21939
Gamma	−0.33118
Sun Right Ascension	02h39m30.8s
Sun Declination	+15°32'26.3"
Sun Semi-Diameter	15'51.7"
Sun Equatorial Horizontal Parallax	08.7"
Moon Right Ascension	14h39m15.0s
Moon Declination	-15°50'11.0"
Moon Semi-Diameter	14'55.8"
Moon Equatorial Horizontal Parallax	0°54'47.6"
ΔT	21.5 s

== Eclipse season ==
This eclipse is part of an eclipse season, a period, roughly every six months, when eclipses occur. Only two (or occasionally three) eclipse seasons occur each year, and each season lasts about 35 days and repeats just short of six months (173 days) later; thus two full eclipse seasons always occur each year. Either two or three eclipses happen each eclipse season. In the sequence below, each eclipse is separated by a fortnight.

Eclipse season of May 1920
May 3 Ascending node (full moon)	May 18 Descending node (new moon)
Total lunar eclipse Lunar Saros 120	Partial solar eclipse Solar Saros 146

== Related eclipses ==
=== Eclipses in 1920 ===
- A total lunar eclipse on May 3.
- A partial solar eclipse on May 18.
- A total lunar eclipse on October 27.
- A partial solar eclipse on November 10.

=== Metonic ===
- Preceded by: Lunar eclipse of July 15, 1916
- Followed by: Lunar eclipse of February 20, 1924

=== Tzolkinex ===
- Preceded by: Lunar eclipse of March 22, 1913
- Followed by: Lunar eclipse of June 15, 1927

=== Half-Saros ===
- Preceded by: Solar eclipse of April 28, 1911
- Followed by: Solar eclipse of May 9, 1929

=== Tritos ===
- Preceded by: Lunar eclipse of June 4, 1909
- Followed by: Lunar eclipse of April 2, 1931

=== Lunar Saros 120 ===
- Preceded by: Lunar eclipse of April 22, 1902
- Followed by: Lunar eclipse of May 14, 1938

=== Inex ===
- Preceded by: Lunar eclipse of May 23, 1891
- Followed by: Lunar eclipse of April 13, 1949

=== Triad ===
- Preceded by: Lunar eclipse of July 2, 1833
- Followed by: Lunar eclipse of March 3, 2007

=== Lunar eclipses of 1919–1922 ===
This eclipse is a member of a semester series. An eclipse in a semester series of lunar eclipses repeats approximately every 177 days and 4 hours (a semester) at alternating nodes of the Moon's orbit.

The penumbral lunar eclipse on March 13, 1922 occurs in the next lunar year eclipse set.

Lunar eclipse series sets from 1919 to 1922
Ascending node				Descending node			
Saros	Date Viewing	Type Chart	Gamma	Saros	Date Viewing	Type Chart	Gamma
110	1919 May 15	Penumbral	−1.0820	115	1919 Nov 07	Partial	0.9246
120	1920 May 03	Total	−0.3312	125	1920 Oct 27	Total	0.2502
130	1921 Apr 22	Total	0.4269	135	1921 Oct 16	Partial	−0.4902
140	1922 Apr 11	Penumbral	1.1228	145	1922 Oct 06	Penumbral	−1.2348

=== Saros 120 ===
This eclipse is a part of Saros series 120, repeating every 18 years, 11 days, and containing 83 events. The series started with a penumbral lunar eclipse on October 16, 1000. It contains partial eclipses from May 31, 1379 through August 4, 1487; total eclipses from August 14, 1505 through May 14, 1938; and a second set of partial eclipses from May 24, 1956 through July 28, 2064. The series ends at member 83 as a penumbral eclipse on April 7, 2479.

The longest duration of totality was produced by member 43 at 104 minutes, 55 seconds on January 24, 1758. All eclipses in this series occur at the Moon’s ascending node of orbit.

Greatest	First			
The greatest eclipse of the series occurred on 1758 Jan 24, lasting 104 minutes, 55 seconds.	Penumbral	Partial	Total	Central
The greatest eclipse of the series occurred on 1758 Jan 24, lasting 104 minutes, 55 seconds.	1000 Oct 16	1379 May 31	1505 Aug 14	1559 Sep 16
The greatest eclipse of the series occurred on 1758 Jan 24, lasting 104 minutes, 55 seconds.	Last			
The greatest eclipse of the series occurred on 1758 Jan 24, lasting 104 minutes, 55 seconds.	Central	Total	Partial	Penumbral
The greatest eclipse of the series occurred on 1758 Jan 24, lasting 104 minutes, 55 seconds.	1902 Apr 22	1938 May 14	2064 Jul 28	2479 Apr 07

Eclipses are tabulated in three columns; every third eclipse in the same column is one exeligmos apart, so they all cast shadows over approximately the same parts of the Earth.

Series members 46–67 occur between 1801 and 2200:
46	47	48
1812 Feb 27	1830 Mar 09	1848 Mar 19
49	50	51
1866 Mar 31	1884 Apr 10	1902 Apr 22
52	53	54
1920 May 03	1938 May 14	1956 May 24
55	56	57
1974 Jun 04	1992 Jun 15	2010 Jun 26
58	59	60
2028 Jul 06	2046 Jul 18	2064 Jul 28
61	62	63
2082 Aug 08	2100 Aug 19	2118 Aug 31
64	65	66
2136 Sep 10	2154 Sep 21	2172 Oct 02
67
2190 Oct 13

=== Tritos series ===
This eclipse is a part of a tritos cycle, repeating at alternating nodes every 135 synodic months (≈ 3986.63 days, or 11 years minus 1 month). Their appearance and longitude are irregular due to a lack of synchronization with the anomalistic month (period of perigee), but groupings of 3 tritos cycles (≈ 33 years minus 3 months) come close (≈ 434.044 anomalistic months), so eclipses are similar in these groupings.

Series members between 1801 and 2200
1811 Mar 10 (Saros 110)	1822 Feb 06 (Saros 111)	1833 Jan 06 (Saros 112)	1843 Dec 07 (Saros 113)	1854 Nov 04 (Saros 114)
1865 Oct 04 (Saros 115)	1876 Sep 03 (Saros 116)	1887 Aug 03 (Saros 117)	1898 Jul 03 (Saros 118)	1909 Jun 04 (Saros 119)
1920 May 03 (Saros 120)	1931 Apr 02 (Saros 121)	1942 Mar 03 (Saros 122)	1953 Jan 29 (Saros 123)	1963 Dec 30 (Saros 124)
1974 Nov 29 (Saros 125)	1985 Oct 28 (Saros 126)	1996 Sep 27 (Saros 127)	2007 Aug 28 (Saros 128)	2018 Jul 27 (Saros 129)
2029 Jun 26 (Saros 130)	2040 May 26 (Saros 131)	2051 Apr 26 (Saros 132)	2062 Mar 25 (Saros 133)	2073 Feb 22 (Saros 134)
2084 Jan 22 (Saros 135)	2094 Dec 21 (Saros 136)	2105 Nov 21 (Saros 137)	2116 Oct 21 (Saros 138)	2127 Sep 20 (Saros 139)
2138 Aug 20 (Saros 140)	2149 Jul 20 (Saros 141)	2160 Jun 18 (Saros 142)	2171 May 19 (Saros 143)	2182 Apr 18 (Saros 144)
2193 Mar 17 (Saros 145)

=== Inex series ===
This eclipse is a part of the long period inex cycle, repeating at alternating nodes, every 358 synodic months (≈ 10,571.95 days, or 29 years minus 20 days). Their appearance and longitude are irregular due to a lack of synchronization with the anomalistic month (period of perigee). However, groupings of 3 inex cycles (≈ 87 years minus 2 months) comes close (≈ 1,151.02 anomalistic months), so eclipses are similar in these groupings.

Series members between 1801 and 2200
1804 Jul 22 (Saros 116)	1833 Jul 02 (Saros 117)	1862 Jun 12 (Saros 118)
1891 May 23 (Saros 119)	1920 May 03 (Saros 120)	1949 Apr 13 (Saros 121)
1978 Mar 24 (Saros 122)	2007 Mar 03 (Saros 123)	2036 Feb 11 (Saros 124)
2065 Jan 22 (Saros 125)	2094 Jan 01 (Saros 126)	2122 Dec 13 (Saros 127)
2151 Nov 24 (Saros 128)	2180 Nov 02 (Saros 129)	

=== Half-Saros cycle ===
A lunar eclipse will be preceded and followed by solar eclipses by 9 years and 5.5 days (a half saros). This lunar eclipse is related to two total solar eclipses of Solar Saros 127.

April 28, 1911	May 9, 1929

== See also ==
- List of lunar eclipses
- List of 20th-century lunar eclipses
