= July 2046 lunar eclipse =

Central lunar eclipse

- Partial eclipse
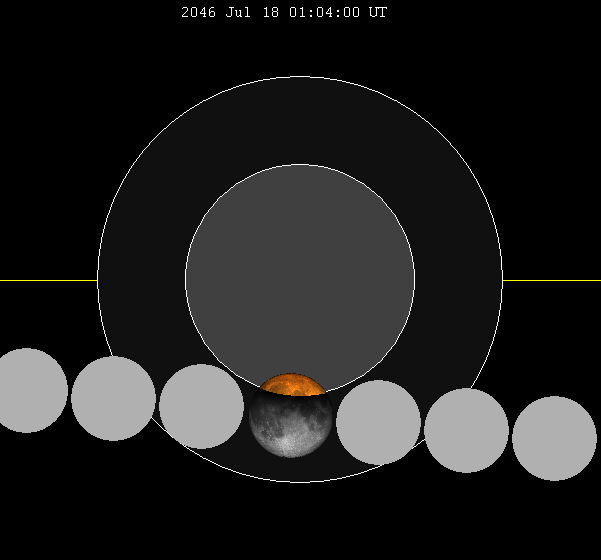
- The Moon's hourly motion shown right to left
- Date: July 18, 2046
- Gamma: −0.8691
- Magnitude: 0.2478
- Saros cycle: 120 (59 of 83)
- Partiality: 114 minutes, 35 seconds
- Penumbral: 298 minutes, 8 seconds
Contacts (UTC)
- P1: 22:35:30
- U1: 0:07:13
- Greatest: 1:04:35
- U4: 2:01:48
- P4: 3:33:38

A partial lunar eclipse will occur at the Moon’s ascending node of orbit on Wednesday, July 18, 2046, with an umbral magnitude of 0.2478. A lunar eclipse occurs when the Moon moves into the Earth's shadow, causing the Moon to be darkened. A partial lunar eclipse occurs when one part of the Moon is in the Earth's umbra, while the other part is in the Earth's penumbra. Unlike a solar eclipse, which can only be viewed from a relatively small area of the world, a lunar eclipse may be viewed from anywhere on the night side of Earth. Occurring about 5.2 days before apogee (on July 23, 2046, at 6:35 UTC), the Moon's apparent diameter will be smaller.

== Visibility ==
The eclipse will be completely visible over South America, western Europe, and Africa, seen rising over much of North America and setting over eastern Europe and the western half of Asia.

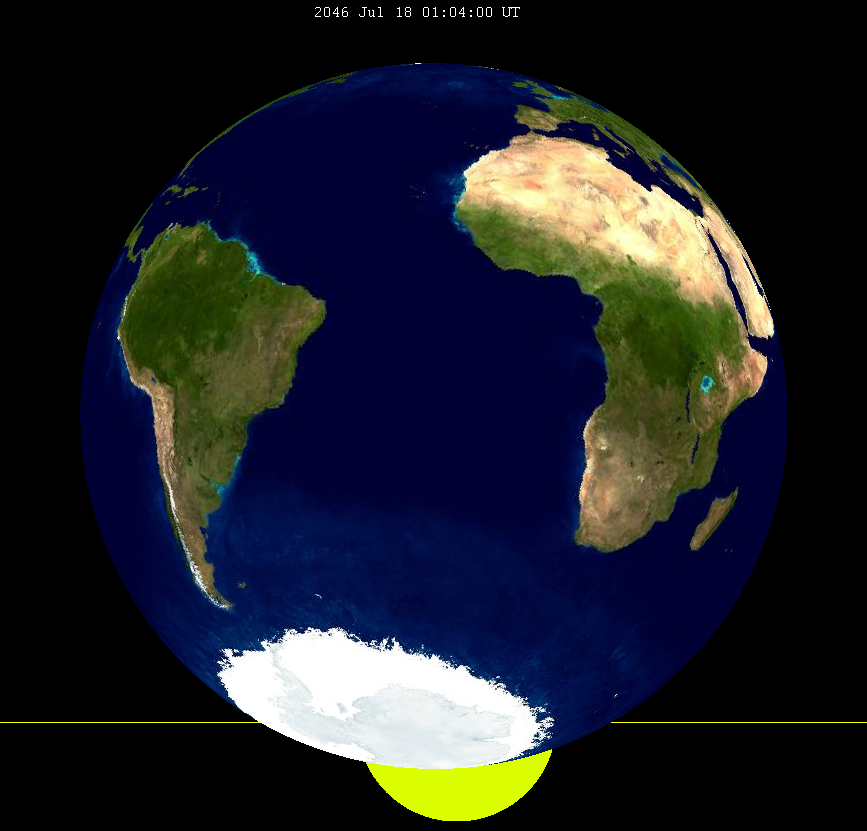
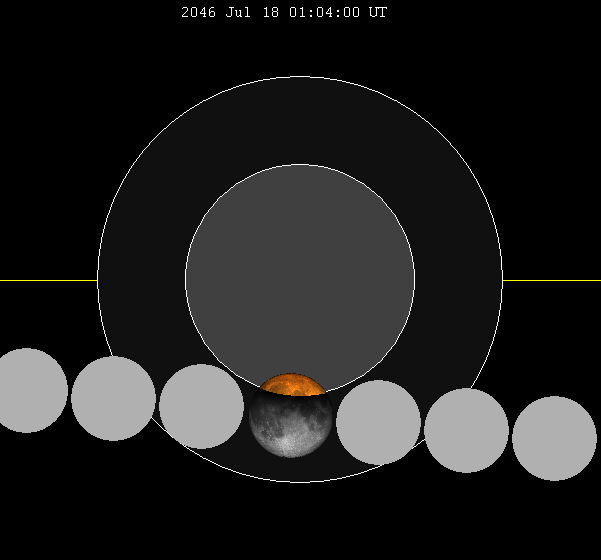

== Eclipse details ==
Shown below is a table displaying details about this particular solar eclipse. It describes various parameters pertaining to this eclipse.

July 18, 2046 Lunar Eclipse Parameters
Parameter	Value
Penumbral Magnitude	1.28236
Umbral Magnitude	0.24776
Gamma	−0.86916
Sun Right Ascension	07h50m23.8s
Sun Declination	+21°00'48.3"
Sun Semi-Diameter	15'44.2"
Sun Equatorial Horizontal Parallax	08.7"
Moon Right Ascension	19h51m22.3s
Moon Declination	-21°47'22.3"
Moon Semi-Diameter	15'12.7"
Moon Equatorial Horizontal Parallax	0°55'49.5"
ΔT	82.9 s

== Eclipse season ==
This eclipse is part of an eclipse season, a period, roughly every six months, when eclipses occur. Only two (or occasionally three) eclipse seasons occur each year, and each season lasts about 35 days and repeats just short of six months (173 days) later; thus two full eclipse seasons always occur each year. Either two or three eclipses happen each eclipse season. In the sequence below, each eclipse is separated by a fortnight.

Eclipse season of July–August 2046
July 18 Ascending node (full moon)	August 2 Descending node (new moon)
Partial lunar eclipse Lunar Saros 120	Total solar eclipse Solar Saros 146

== Related eclipses ==
=== Eclipses in 2046 ===
- A partial lunar eclipse on January 22.
- An annular solar eclipse on February 5.
- A partial lunar eclipse on July 18.
- A total solar eclipse on August 2.

=== Metonic ===
- Preceded by: Lunar eclipse of September 29, 2042
- Followed by: Lunar eclipse of May 6, 2050

=== Tzolkinex ===
- Preceded by: Lunar eclipse of June 6, 2039
- Followed by: Lunar eclipse of August 29, 2053

=== Half-Saros ===
- Preceded by: Solar eclipse of July 13, 2037
- Followed by: Solar eclipse of July 24, 2055

=== Tritos ===
- Preceded by: Lunar eclipse of August 19, 2035
- Followed by: Lunar eclipse of June 17, 2057

=== Lunar Saros 120 ===
- Preceded by: Lunar eclipse of July 6, 2028
- Followed by: Lunar eclipse of July 28, 2064

=== Inex ===
- Preceded by: Lunar eclipse of August 7, 2017
- Followed by: Lunar eclipse of June 28, 2075

=== Triad ===
- Preceded by: Lunar eclipse of September 17, 1959
- Followed by: Lunar eclipse of May 19, 2133

=== Lunar eclipses of 2046–2049 ===
This eclipse is a member of a semester series. An eclipse in a semester series of lunar eclipses repeats approximately every 177 days and 4 hours (a semester) at alternating nodes of the Moon's orbit.

The penumbral lunar eclipses on May 17, 2049 and November 9, 2049 occur in the next lunar year eclipse set.

Lunar eclipse series sets from 2046 to 2049
Descending node				Ascending node			
Saros	Date Viewing	Type Chart	Gamma	Saros	Date Viewing	Type Chart	Gamma
115	2046 Jan 22	Partial	0.9885	120	2046 Jul 18	Partial	−0.8691
125	2047 Jan 12	Total	0.3317	130	2047 Jul 07	Total	−0.0636
135	2048 Jan 01	Total	−0.3745	140	2048 Jun 26	Partial	0.6796
145	2048 Dec 20	Penumbral	−1.0624	150	2049 Jun 15	Penumbral	1.4068

=== Saros 120 ===
This eclipse is a part of Saros series 120, repeating every 18 years, 11 days, and containing 83 events. The series started with a penumbral lunar eclipse on October 16, 1000. It contains partial eclipses from May 31, 1379 through August 4, 1487; total eclipses from August 14, 1505 through May 14, 1938; and a second set of partial eclipses from May 24, 1956 through July 28, 2064. The series ends at member 83 as a penumbral eclipse on April 7, 2479.

The longest duration of totality was produced by member 43 at 104 minutes, 55 seconds on January 24, 1758. All eclipses in this series occur at the Moon’s ascending node of orbit.

Greatest	First			
The greatest eclipse of the series occurred on 1758 Jan 24, lasting 104 minutes, 55 seconds.	Penumbral	Partial	Total	Central
The greatest eclipse of the series occurred on 1758 Jan 24, lasting 104 minutes, 55 seconds.	1000 Oct 16	1379 May 31	1505 Aug 14	1559 Sep 16
The greatest eclipse of the series occurred on 1758 Jan 24, lasting 104 minutes, 55 seconds.	Last			
The greatest eclipse of the series occurred on 1758 Jan 24, lasting 104 minutes, 55 seconds.	Central	Total	Partial	Penumbral
The greatest eclipse of the series occurred on 1758 Jan 24, lasting 104 minutes, 55 seconds.	1902 Apr 22	1938 May 14	2064 Jul 28	2479 Apr 07

Eclipses are tabulated in three columns; every third eclipse in the same column is one exeligmos apart, so they all cast shadows over approximately the same parts of the Earth.

Series members 46–67 occur between 1801 and 2200:
46	47	48
1812 Feb 27	1830 Mar 09	1848 Mar 19
49	50	51
1866 Mar 31	1884 Apr 10	1902 Apr 22
52	53	54
1920 May 03	1938 May 14	1956 May 24
55	56	57
1974 Jun 04	1992 Jun 15	2010 Jun 26
58	59	60
2028 Jul 06	2046 Jul 18	2064 Jul 28
61	62	63
2082 Aug 08	2100 Aug 19	2118 Aug 31
64	65	66
2136 Sep 10	2154 Sep 21	2172 Oct 02
67
2190 Oct 13

=== Tritos series ===
This eclipse is a part of a tritos cycle, repeating at alternating nodes every 135 synodic months (≈ 3986.63 days, or 11 years minus 1 month). Their appearance and longitude are irregular due to a lack of synchronization with the anomalistic month (period of perigee), but groupings of 3 tritos cycles (≈ 33 years minus 3 months) come close (≈ 434.044 anomalistic months), so eclipses are similar in these groupings.

Series members between 1817 and 2200
1817 May 01 (Saros 99)	1828 Mar 31 (Saros 100)	1839 Feb 28 (Saros 101)	1850 Jan 28 (Saros 102)	1860 Dec 28 (Saros 103)
		1893 Sep 25 (Saros 106)		1915 Jul 26 (Saros 108)
1926 Jun 25 (Saros 109)	1937 May 25 (Saros 110)	1948 Apr 23 (Saros 111)	1959 Mar 24 (Saros 112)	1970 Feb 21 (Saros 113)
1981 Jan 20 (Saros 114)	1991 Dec 21 (Saros 115)	2002 Nov 20 (Saros 116)	2013 Oct 18 (Saros 117)	2024 Sep 18 (Saros 118)
2035 Aug 19 (Saros 119)	2046 Jul 18 (Saros 120)	2057 Jun 17 (Saros 121)	2068 May 17 (Saros 122)	2079 Apr 16 (Saros 123)
2090 Mar 15 (Saros 124)	2101 Feb 14 (Saros 125)	2112 Jan 14 (Saros 126)	2122 Dec 13 (Saros 127)	2133 Nov 12 (Saros 128)
2144 Oct 11 (Saros 129)	2155 Sep 11 (Saros 130)	2166 Aug 11 (Saros 131)	2177 Jul 11 (Saros 132)	2188 Jun 09 (Saros 133)
2199 May 10 (Saros 134)

=== Inex series ===
This eclipse is a part of the long period inex cycle, repeating at alternating nodes, every 358 synodic months (≈ 10,571.95 days, or 29 years minus 20 days). Their appearance and longitude are irregular due to a lack of synchronization with the anomalistic month (period of perigee). However, groupings of 3 inex cycles (≈ 87 years minus 2 months) comes close (≈ 1,151.02 anomalistic months), so eclipses are similar in these groupings.

Series members between 1801 and 2200
1814 Dec 26 (Saros 112)	1843 Dec 07 (Saros 113)	1872 Nov 15 (Saros 114)
1901 Oct 27 (Saros 115)	1930 Oct 07 (Saros 116)	1959 Sep 17 (Saros 117)
1988 Aug 27 (Saros 118)	2017 Aug 07 (Saros 119)	2046 Jul 18 (Saros 120)
2075 Jun 28 (Saros 121)	2104 Jun 08 (Saros 122)	2133 May 19 (Saros 123)
2162 Apr 29 (Saros 124)	2191 Apr 09 (Saros 125)	

=== Half-Saros cycle ===
A lunar eclipse will be preceded and followed by solar eclipses by 9 years and 5.5 days (a half saros). This lunar eclipse is related to two total solar eclipses of Solar Saros 127.

July 13, 2037	July 24, 2055

== See also ==
- List of lunar eclipses and List of 21st-century lunar eclipses
