= Lunar Saros 120 =

Series of lunar eclipses

Member 57
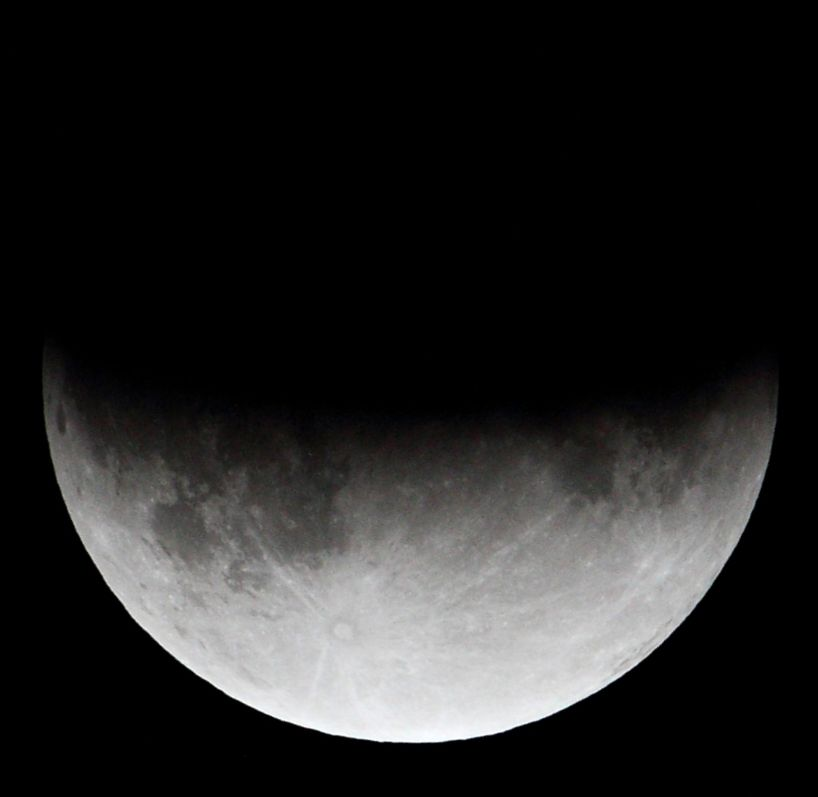
June 26, 2010

Saros cycle series 120 for lunar eclipses occurs at the moon's ascending node, 18 years 11 and 1/3 days. It contains 83 events.

This lunar saros is linked to Solar Saros 127.

Cat.	Saros	Mem	Date	Time UT (hr:mn)	Type	Gamma	Magnitude	Duration (min)			Contacts UT (hr:mn)						Chart
Cat.	Saros	Mem	Date	Greatest	Type	Gamma	Magnitude	Pen.	Par.	Tot.	P1	P4	U1	U2	U3	U4	Chart
07219	120	1	1000 Oct 16	1:35:42	Penumbral	1.5463	-0.9862	47.1			1:12:09	1:59:15					
07263	120	2	1018 Oct 27	9:53:57	Penumbral	1.5341	-0.9666	65.2			9:21:21	10:26:33					
07307	120	3	1036 Nov 06	18:16:32	Penumbral	1.5260	-0.9544	75.4			17:38:50	18:54:14					
07352	120	4	1054 Nov 18	2:44:30	Penumbral	1.5231	-0.9513	79.7			2:04:39	3:24:21					
07396	120	5	1072 Nov 28	11:14:15	Penumbral	1.5223	-0.9518	81.8			10:33:21	11:55:09					
07441	120	6	1090 Dec 09	19:45:28	Penumbral	1.5233	-0.9555	82.0			19:04:28	20:26:28					
07487	120	7	1108 Dec 20	4:16:00	Penumbral	1.5246	-0.9593	81.9			3:35:03	4:56:57					
07533	120	8	1126 Dec 31	12:45:19	Penumbral	1.5261	-0.9632	81.3			12:04:40	13:25:58					
07579	120	9	1145 Jan 10	21:09:35	Penumbral	1.5241	-0.9604	83.9			20:27:38	21:51:32					
07626	120	10	1163 Jan 22	5:29:14	Penumbral	1.5192	-0.952	88.8			4:44:50	6:13:38					
07673	120	11	1181 Feb 1	13:41:16	Penumbral	1.5091	-0.9337	97.6			12:52:28	14:30:04					
07719	120	12	1199 Feb 12	21:46:45	Penumbral	1.4944	-0.907	108.9			20:52:18	22:41:12					
07765	120	13	1217 Feb 23	5:41:09	Penumbral	1.4720	-0.8659	123.9			4:39:12	6:43:06					
07811	120	14	1235 Mar 06	13:27:40	Penumbral	1.4439	-0.8143	140.3			12:17:31	14:37:49					
07856	120	15	1253 Mar 16	21:02:30	Penumbral	1.4071	-0.7467	158.9			19:43:03	22:21:57					
07900	120	16	1271 Mar 28	4:28:45	Penumbral	1.3642	-0.6679	177.8			2:59:51	5:57:39					
07945	120	17	1289 Apr 07	11:43:12	Penumbral	1.3125	-0.5732	197.6			10:04:24	13:22:00					
07990	120	18	1307 Apr 18	18:50:03	Penumbral	1.2553	-0.4683	216.9			17:01:36	20:38:30					
08033	120	19	1325 Apr 29	1:47:03	Penumbral	1.1908	-0.3501	236.1			23:49:00	3:45:06					
08075	120	20	1343 May 10	8:36:45	Penumbral	1.1208	-0.2221	254.5			6:29:30	10:44:00					
08117	120	21	1361 May 20	15:19:11	Penumbral	1.0453	-0.0841	272.0			13:03:11	17:35:11					
08158	120	22	1379 May 31	21:57:14	Partial	0.9665	0.0597	288.2	58.8		19:33:08	0:21:20	21:27:50			22:26:38	
08199	120	23	1397 Jun 11	4:31:36	Partial	0.8850	0.2082	303.0	107.8		2:00:06	7:03:06	3:37:42			5:25:30	
08240	120	24	1415 Jun 22	11:03:06	Partial	0.8015	0.3602	316.4	139.0		8:24:54	13:41:18	9:53:36			12:12:36	
08282	120	25	1433 Jul 02	17:34:56	Partial	0.7183	0.5115	328.2	162.2		14:50:50	20:19:02	16:13:50			18:56:02	
08323	120	26	1451 Jul 14	0:07:29	Partial	0.6357	0.6615	338.5	180.3		21:18:14	2:56:44	22:37:20			1:37:38	
08364	120	27	1469 Jul 24	6:42:46	Partial	0.5556	0.8066	347.3	194.6		3:49:07	9:36:25	5:05:28			8:20:04	
08404	120	28	1487 Aug 04	13:21:13	Partial	0.4783	0.9466	354.6	205.8		10:23:55	16:18:31	11:38:19			15:04:07	
08444	120	29	1505 Aug 14	20:05:59	Total	0.4063	1.0766	360.6	214.4	44.7	17:05:41	23:06:17	18:18:47	19:43:38	20:28:20	21:53:11	
08485	120	30	1523 Aug 26	2:57:01	Total	0.3395	1.1971	365.5	221.0	68.9	23:54:16	5:59:46	1:06:31	2:22:34	3:31:28	4:47:31	
08526	120	31	1541 Sep 05	9:54:46	Total	0.2784	1.3072	369.3	225.8	82.7	6:50:07	12:59:25	8:01:52	9:13:25	10:36:07	11:47:40	
08569	120	32	1559 Sep 16	17:01:00	Total	0.2244	1.4041	372.2	229.3	91.3	13:54:54	20:07:06	15:06:21	16:15:21	17:46:39	18:55:39	
08612	120	33	1577 Sep 27	0:16:07	Total	0.1781	1.4869	374.4	231.6	96.7	21:08:55	3:23:19	22:20:19	23:27:46	1:04:28	2:11:55	
08655	120	34	1595 Oct 18	7:40:06	Total	0.1391	1.5567	376.0	233.1	100.2	4:32:06	10:48:06	5:43:33	6:50:00	8:30:12	9:36:39	
08699	120	35	1613 Oct 28	15:11:40	Total	0.1064	1.6149	377.2	234.1	102.3	12:03:04	18:20:16	13:14:37	14:20:31	16:02:49	17:08:43	
08743	120	36	1631 Nov 08	22:51:38	Total	0.0805	1.6608	378.1	234.7	103.5	19:42:35	2:00:41	20:54:17	21:59:53	23:43:23	0:48:59	
08787	120	37	1649 Nov 19	6:38:54	Total	0.0608	1.6957	378.6	234.9	104.1	3:29:36	9:48:12	4:41:27	5:46:51	7:30:57	8:36:21	
08832	120	38	1667 Nov 30	14:31:26	Total	0.0455	1.7228	379.0	235.1	104.5	11:21:56	17:40:56	12:33:53	13:39:11	15:23:41	16:28:59	
08878	120	39	1685 Dec 10	22:29:22	Total	0.0346	1.7422	379.1	235.1	104.7	19:19:49	1:38:55	20:31:49	21:37:01	23:21:43	0:26:55	
08924	120	40	1703 Dec 23	6:29:54	Total	0.0258	1.7582	379.1	235.1	104.7	3:20:21	9:39:27	4:32:21	5:37:33	7:22:15	8:27:27	
08971	120	41	1722 Jan 02	14:32:53	Total	0.0187	1.7714	378.9	235.0	104.8	11:23:26	17:42:20	12:35:23	13:40:29	15:25:17	16:30:23	
09018	120	42	1740 Jan 13	22:33:33	Total	0.0096	1.7887	378.5	235.0	104.9	19:24:18	1:42:48	20:36:03	21:41:06	23:26:00	0:31:03	
09065	120	43	1758 Jan 24	6:34:14	Total	0.0003	1.8067	378.0	234.9	104.9	3:25:14	9:43:14	4:36:47	5:41:47	7:26:41	8:31:41	
09111	120	44	1776 Feb 04	14:29:50	Total	-0.0128	1.7851	377.4	234.7	104.9	11:21:08	17:38:32	12:32:29	13:37:23	15:22:17	16:27:11	
09156	120	45	1794 Feb 14	22:21:16	Total	-0.0300	1.7553	376.5	234.5	104.8	19:13:01	1:29:31	20:24:01	21:28:52	23:13:40	0:18:31	
09201	120	46	1812 Feb 27	6:04:51	Total	-0.0538	1.7135	375.5	234.1	104.3	2:57:06	9:12:36	4:07:48	5:12:42	6:57:00	8:01:54	
09246	120	47	1830 Mar 09	13:42:57	Total	-0.0824	1.6632	374.2	233.4	103.3	10:35:51	16:50:03	11:46:15	12:51:18	14:34:36	15:39:39	
09293	120	48	1848 Mar 19	21:12:12	Total	-0.1186	1.5993	372.5	232.4	101.4	18:05:57	0:18:27	19:16:00	20:21:30	22:02:54	23:08:24	
09337	120	49	1866 Mar 31	4:33:35	Total	-0.1614	1.5232	370.4	230.7	98.2	1:28:23	7:38:47	2:38:14	3:44:29	5:22:41	6:28:56	
09380	120	50	1884 Apr 10	11:46:34	Total	-0.2116	1.4337	367.7	228.2	92.9	8:42:43	14:50:25	9:52:28	11:00:07	12:33:01	13:40:40	
09424	120	51	1902 Apr 22	18:52:40	Total	-0.2680	1.3327	364.3	224.6	84.6	15:50:31	21:54:49	17:00:22	18:10:22	19:34:58	20:44:58	
09466	120	52	1920 May 03	1:51:08	Total	-0.3312	1.2194	360.1	219.7	71.5	22:51:05	4:51:11	0:01:17	1:15:23	2:26:53	3:40:59	
09508	120	53	1938 May 14	8:44:00	Total	-0.3994	1.0966	354.9	213.1	49.4	5:46:33	11:41:27	6:57:27	8:19:18	9:08:42	10:30:33	
09549	120	54	1956 May 24	15:31:52	Partial	-0.4726	0.9647	348.5	204.5		12:37:37	18:26:07	13:49:37			17:14:07	
09591	120	55	1974 Jun 04	22:16:44	Partial	-0.5488	0.8269	341.0	193.6		19:26:14	1:07:14	20:39:56			23:53:32	
09632	120	56	1992 Jun 15	4:57:57	Partial	-0.6288	0.6822	332.2	179.8		2:11:51	7:44:03	3:28:03			6:27:51	
09673	120	57	2010 Jun 26	11:39:34	Partial	-0.7091	0.5368	322.1	162.9		8:58:31	14:20:37	10:18:07			13:01:01	
09714	120	58	2028 Jul 06	18:20:57	Partial	-0.7903	0.3892	310.6	141.5		15:45:39	20:56:15	17:10:12			19:31:42	
09754	120	59	2046 Jul 18	1:06:05	Partial	-0.8691	0.2461	298.1	114.6		22:37:02	3:35:08	0:08:47			2:03:23	
09795	120	60	2064 Jul 28	7:52:48	Partial	-0.9473	0.1038	284.3	75.7		5:30:39	10:14:57	7:14:57			8:30:39	
09836	120	61	2082 Aug 08	14:46:42	Penumbral	-1.0203	-0.0294	269.8			12:31:48	17:01:36					
09878	120	62	2100 Aug 19	21:44:58	Penumbral	-1.0905	-0.1575	254.2			19:37:52	23:52:04					
09920	120	63	2118 Aug 31	4:51:45	Penumbral	-1.1543	-0.2740	238.5			2:52:30	6:51:00					
09963	120	64	2136 Sep 10	12:05:06	Penumbral	-1.2134	-0.3821	222.2			10:14:00	13:56:12					
10007	120	65	2154 Sep 21	19:29:06	Penumbral	-1.2646	-0.4759	206.5			17:45:51	21:12:21					
10050	120	66	2172 Oct 02	3:01:41	Penumbral	-1.3098	-0.5586	191.3			1:26:02	4:37:20					
10093	120	67	2190 Oct 13	10:43:55	Penumbral	-1.3479	-0.6285	176.9			9:15:28	12:12:22					
10136	120	68	2208 Oct 24	18:36:02	Penumbral	-1.3789	-0.6853	164.2			17:13:56	19:58:08					
10180	120	69	2226 Nov 05	2:38:01	Penumbral	-1.4024	-0.7283	153.5			1:21:16	3:54:46					
10225	120	70	2244 Nov 15	10:48:54	Penumbral	-1.4201	-0.7605	144.8			9:36:30	12:01:18					
10271	120	71	2262 Nov 26	19:06:54	Penumbral	-1.4327	-0.7833	138.1			17:57:51	20:15:57					
10317	120	72	2280 Dec 07	3:32:38	Penumbral	-1.4402	-0.7964	133.7			2:25:47	4:39:29					
10363	120	73	2298 Dec 18	12:03:40	Penumbral	-1.4439	-0.8025	131.1			10:58:07	13:09:13					
10409	120	74	2316 Dec 29	20:38:45	Penumbral	-1.4452	-0.8039	129.7			19:33:54	21:43:36					
10455	120	75	2335 Jan 10	5:16:00	Penumbral	-1.4453	-0.8029	128.9			4:11:33	6:20:27					
10501	120	76	2353 Jan 20	13:54:28	Penumbral	-1.4453	-0.8012	128.0			12:50:28	14:58:28					
10546	120	77	2371 Jan 31	22:31:48	Penumbral	-1.4466	-0.8019	126.3			21:28:39	23:34:57					
10590	120	78	2389 Feb 11	7:06:06	Penumbral	-1.4510	-0.8078	122.9			6:04:39	8:07:33					
10635	120	79	2407 Feb 22	15:37:08	Penumbral	-1.4584	-0.8192	117.6			14:38:20	16:35:56					
10679	120	80	2425 Mar 05	0:03:15	Penumbral	-1.4701	-0.8383	109.5			23:08:30	0:58:00					
10723	120	81	2443 Mar 16	8:22:54	Penumbral	-1.4877	-0.8680	96.7			7:34:33	9:11:15					
10767	120	82	2461 Mar 26	16:36:11	Penumbral	-1.5110	-0.9080	77.1			15:57:38	17:14:44					
10809	120	83	2479 Apr 07	0:42:37	Penumbral	-1.5402	-0.9591	41.1			0:22:04	1:03:10					

== See also ==
- List of lunar eclipses
  - List of Saros series for lunar eclipses
