= July 1981 lunar eclipse =

Partial lunar eclipse July 17, 1981

- Partial eclipse
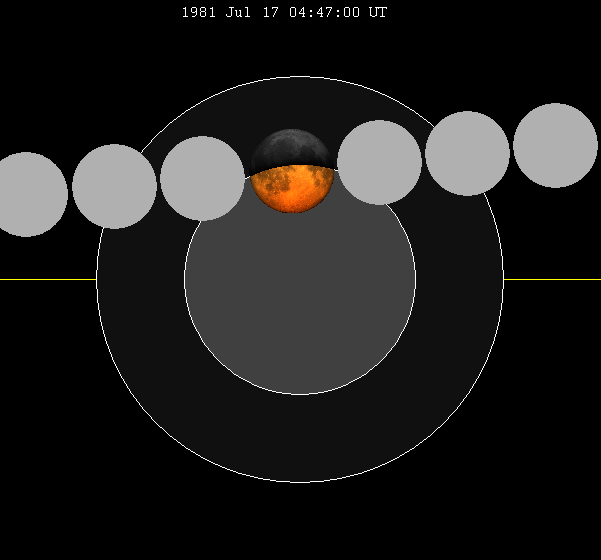
- The Moon's hourly motion shown right to left
- Date: July 17, 1981
- Gamma: 0.7045
- Magnitude: 0.5486
- Saros cycle: 119 (60 of 83)
- Partiality: 163 minutes, 13 seconds
- Penumbral: 319 minutes, 37 seconds
Contacts (UTC)
- P1: 2:06:59
- U1: 3:25:15
- Greatest: 4:46:48
- U4: 6:08:28
- P4: 7:26:36

A partial lunar eclipse occurred at the Moon’s descending node of orbit on Friday, July 17, 1981, with an umbral magnitude of 0.5486. A lunar eclipse occurs when the Moon moves into the Earth's shadow, causing the Moon to be darkened. A partial lunar eclipse occurs when one part of the Moon is in the Earth's umbra, while the other part is in the Earth's penumbra. Unlike a solar eclipse, which can only be viewed from a relatively small area of the world, a lunar eclipse may be viewed from anywhere on the night side of Earth. Occurring about 5.4 days after apogee (on July 11, 1981, at 18:35 UTC), the Moon's apparent diameter was smaller.

== Visibility ==
The eclipse was completely visible over central and eastern North America, South America, and Antarctica, seen rising over western North America and the central Pacific Ocean and setting over much of Europe, Africa, and the Middle East.

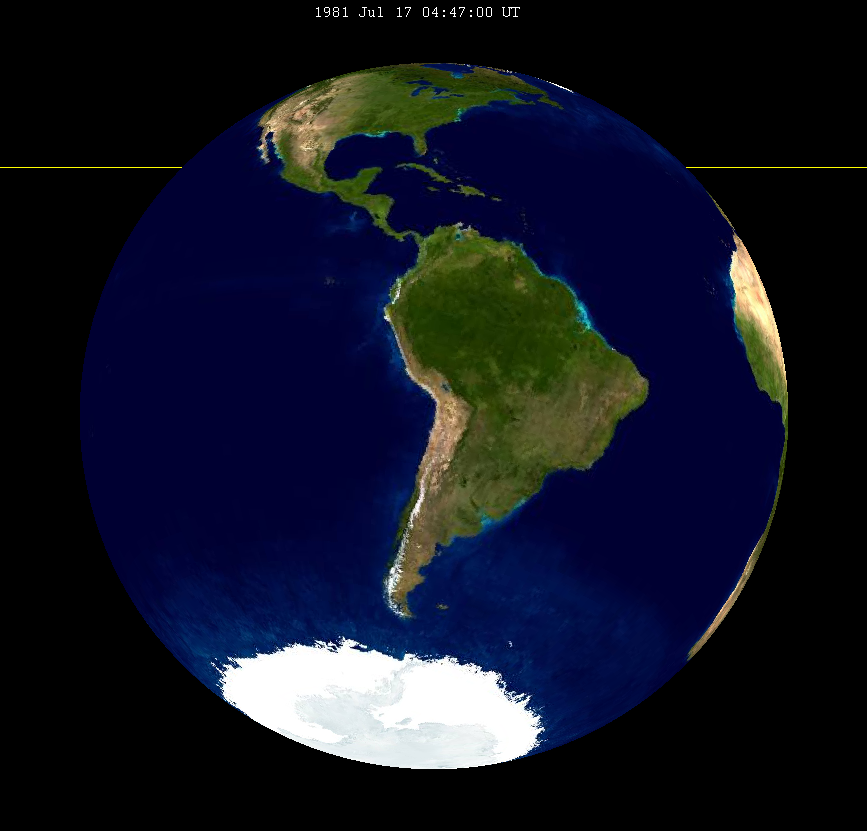
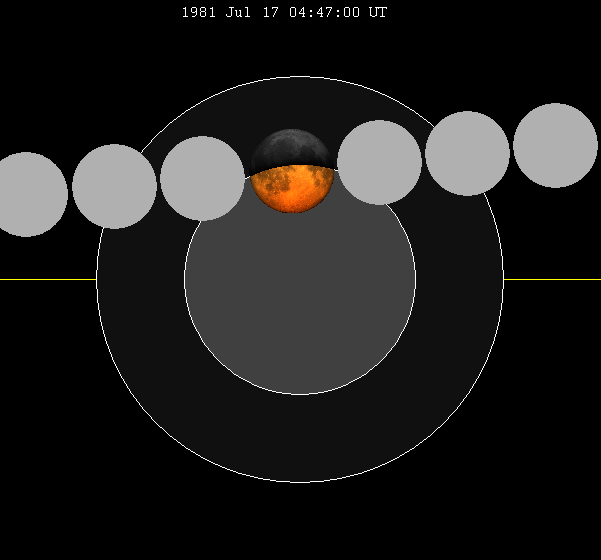

== Eclipse details ==
Shown below is a table displaying details about this particular lunar eclipse. It describes various parameters pertaining to this eclipse.

July 17, 1981 Lunar Eclipse Parameters
Parameter	Value
Penumbral Magnitude	1.58223
Umbral Magnitude	0.54860
Gamma	0.70454
Sun Right Ascension	07h45m44.1s
Sun Declination	+21°13'06.1"
Sun Semi-Diameter	15'44.2"
Sun Equatorial Horizontal Parallax	08.7"
Moon Right Ascension	19h45m30.8s
Moon Declination	-20°33'51.6"
Moon Semi-Diameter	15'13.5"
Moon Equatorial Horizontal Parallax	0°55'52.6"
ΔT	51.9 s

== Eclipse season ==
This eclipse is part of an eclipse season, a period, roughly every six months, when eclipses occur. Only two (or occasionally three) eclipse seasons occur each year, and each season lasts about 35 days and repeats just short of six months (173 days) later; thus two full eclipse seasons always occur each year. Either two or three eclipses happen each eclipse season. In the sequence below, each eclipse is separated by a fortnight.

Eclipse season of July 1981
July 17 Descending node (full moon)	July 31 Ascending node (new moon)
Partial lunar eclipse Lunar Saros 119	Total solar eclipse Solar Saros 145

== Related eclipses ==
=== Eclipses in 1981 ===
- A penumbral lunar eclipse on January 20.
- An annular solar eclipse on February 4.
- A partial lunar eclipse on July 17.
- A total solar eclipse on July 31.

=== Metonic ===
- Preceded by: Lunar eclipse of September 27, 1977
- Followed by: Lunar eclipse of May 4, 1985

=== Tzolkinex ===
- Preceded by: Lunar eclipse of June 4, 1974
- Followed by: Lunar eclipse of August 27, 1988

=== Half-Saros ===
- Preceded by: Solar eclipse of July 10, 1972
- Followed by: Solar eclipse of July 22, 1990

=== Tritos ===
- Preceded by: Lunar eclipse of August 17, 1970
- Followed by: Lunar eclipse of June 15, 1992

=== Lunar Saros 119 ===
- Preceded by: Lunar eclipse of July 6, 1963
- Followed by: Lunar eclipse of July 28, 1999

=== Inex ===
- Preceded by: Lunar eclipse of August 5, 1952
- Followed by: Lunar eclipse of June 26, 2010

=== Triad ===
- Preceded by: Lunar eclipse of September 15, 1894
- Followed by: Lunar eclipse of May 17, 2068

=== Lunar eclipses of 1980–1984 ===
This eclipse is a member of a semester series. An eclipse in a semester series of lunar eclipses repeats approximately every 177 days and 4 hours (a semester) at alternating nodes of the Moon's orbit.

The penumbral lunar eclipses on March 1, 1980 and August 26, 1980 occur in the previous lunar year eclipse set, and the penumbral lunar eclipses on May 15, 1984 and November 8, 1984 occur in the next lunar year eclipse set.

Lunar eclipse series sets from 1980 to 1984
Descending node				Ascending node			
Saros	Date Viewing	Type Chart	Gamma	Saros	Date Viewing	Type Chart	Gamma
109	1980 Jul 27	Penumbral	1.4139	114	1981 Jan 20	Penumbral	−1.0142
119	1981 Jul 17	Partial	0.7045	124	1982 Jan 09	Total	−0.2916
129	1982 Jul 06	Total	−0.0579	134	1982 Dec 30	Total	0.3758
139	1983 Jun 25	Partial	−0.8152	144	1983 Dec 20	Penumbral	1.0747
149	1984 Jun 13	Penumbral	−1.5240				

=== Saros 119 ===
This eclipse is a part of Saros series 119, repeating every 18 years, 11 days, and containing 82 events. The series started with a penumbral lunar eclipse on October 14, 935 AD. It contains partial eclipses from May 18, 1296 through August 2, 1422; total eclipses from August 13, 1440 through June 15, 1927; and a second set of partial eclipses from June 25, 1945 through August 19, 2035. The series ends at member 82 as a penumbral eclipse on March 25, 2396.

The longest duration of totality was produced by member 49 at 102 minutes, 6 seconds on March 30, 1801. All eclipses in this series occur at the Moon’s descending node of orbit.

Greatest	First			
The greatest eclipse of the series occurred on 1801 Mar 30, lasting 102 minutes, 6 seconds.	Penumbral	Partial	Total	Central
The greatest eclipse of the series occurred on 1801 Mar 30, lasting 102 minutes, 6 seconds.	934 Oct 14	1296 May 18	1440 Aug 13	1512 Sep 25
The greatest eclipse of the series occurred on 1801 Mar 30, lasting 102 minutes, 6 seconds.	Last			
The greatest eclipse of the series occurred on 1801 Mar 30, lasting 102 minutes, 6 seconds.	Central	Total	Partial	Penumbral
The greatest eclipse of the series occurred on 1801 Mar 30, lasting 102 minutes, 6 seconds.	1873 May 12	1927 Jun 15	2035 Aug 19	2396 Mar 25

Eclipses are tabulated in three columns; every third eclipse in the same column is one exeligmos apart, so they all cast shadows over approximately the same parts of the Earth.

Series members 49–71 occur between 1801 and 2200:
49	50	51
1801 Mar 30	1819 Apr 10	1837 Apr 20
52	53	54
1855 May 02	1873 May 12	1891 May 23
55	56	57
1909 Jun 04	1927 Jun 15	1945 Jun 25
58	59	60
1963 Jul 06	1981 Jul 17	1999 Jul 28
61	62	63
2017 Aug 07	2035 Aug 19	2053 Aug 29
64	65	66
2071 Sep 09	2089 Sep 19	2107 Oct 02
67	68	69
2125 Oct 12	2143 Oct 23	2161 Nov 03
70	71	
2179 Nov 14	2197 Nov 24	

=== Tritos series ===
This eclipse is a part of a tritos cycle, repeating at alternating nodes every 135 synodic months (≈ 3986.63 days, or 11 years minus 1 month). Their appearance and longitude are irregular due to a lack of synchronization with the anomalistic month (period of perigee), but groupings of 3 tritos cycles (≈ 33 years minus 3 months) come close (≈ 434.044 anomalistic months), so eclipses are similar in these groupings.

Series members between 1801 and 2200
1806 Nov 26 (Saros 103)		1828 Sep 23 (Saros 105)	1839 Aug 24 (Saros 106)	1850 Jul 24 (Saros 107)
1861 Jun 22 (Saros 108)	1872 May 22 (Saros 109)	1883 Apr 22 (Saros 110)	1894 Mar 21 (Saros 111)	1905 Feb 19 (Saros 112)
1916 Jan 20 (Saros 113)	1926 Dec 19 (Saros 114)	1937 Nov 18 (Saros 115)	1948 Oct 18 (Saros 116)	1959 Sep 17 (Saros 117)
1970 Aug 17 (Saros 118)	1981 Jul 17 (Saros 119)	1992 Jun 15 (Saros 120)	2003 May 16 (Saros 121)	2014 Apr 15 (Saros 122)
2025 Mar 14 (Saros 123)	2036 Feb 11 (Saros 124)	2047 Jan 12 (Saros 125)	2057 Dec 11 (Saros 126)	2068 Nov 09 (Saros 127)
2079 Oct 10 (Saros 128)	2090 Sep 08 (Saros 129)	2101 Aug 09 (Saros 130)	2112 Jul 09 (Saros 131)	2123 Jun 09 (Saros 132)
2134 May 08 (Saros 133)	2145 Apr 07 (Saros 134)	2156 Mar 07 (Saros 135)	2167 Feb 04 (Saros 136)	2178 Jan 04 (Saros 137)
2188 Dec 04 (Saros 138)	2199 Nov 02 (Saros 139)			

=== Inex series ===
This eclipse is a part of the long period inex cycle, repeating at alternating nodes, every 358 synodic months (≈ 10,571.95 days, or 29 years minus 20 days). Their appearance and longitude are irregular due to a lack of synchronization with the anomalistic month (period of perigee). However, groupings of 3 inex cycles (≈ 87 years minus 2 months) comes close (≈ 1,151.02 anomalistic months), so eclipses are similar in these groupings.

Series members between 1801 and 2200
1807 Nov 15 (Saros 113)	1836 Oct 24 (Saros 114)	1865 Oct 04 (Saros 115)
1894 Sep 15 (Saros 116)	1923 Aug 26 (Saros 117)	1952 Aug 05 (Saros 118)
1981 Jul 17 (Saros 119)	2010 Jun 26 (Saros 120)	2039 Jun 06 (Saros 121)
2068 May 17 (Saros 122)	2097 Apr 26 (Saros 123)	2126 Apr 07 (Saros 124)
2155 Mar 19 (Saros 125)	2184 Feb 26 (Saros 126)	

=== Half-Saros cycle ===
A lunar eclipse will be preceded and followed by solar eclipses by 9 years and 5.5 days (a half saros). This lunar eclipse is related to two total solar eclipses of Solar Saros 126.

July 10, 1972	July 22, 1990

== See also ==
- List of lunar eclipses
- List of 20th-century lunar eclipses
