= July 1963 lunar eclipse =

Partial lunar eclipse July 6, 1963

- Partial eclipse
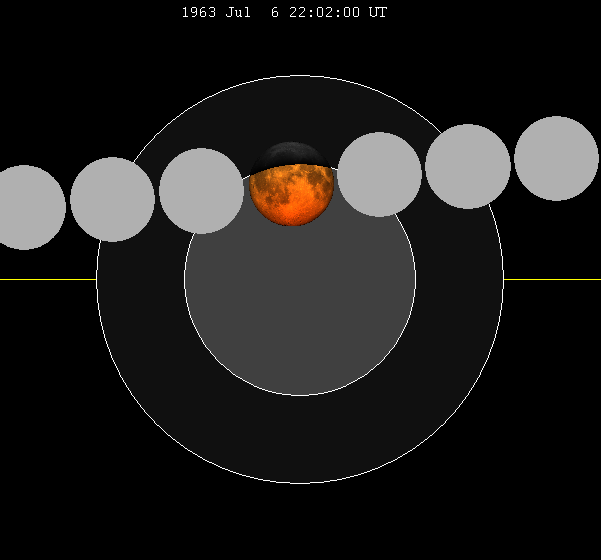
- The Moon's hourly motion shown right to left
- Date: July 6, 1963
- Gamma: 0.6197
- Magnitude: 0.7060
- Saros cycle: 119 (59 of 83)
- Partiality: 179 minutes, 54 seconds
- Penumbral: 327 minutes, 12 seconds
Contacts (UTC)
- P1: 19:18:47
- U1: 20:32:30
- Greatest: 22:02:24
- U4: 23:32:24
- P4: 0:45:59

A partial lunar eclipse occurred at the Moon’s descending node of orbit on Saturday, July 6, 1963, with an umbral magnitude of 0.7060. A lunar eclipse occurs when the Moon moves into the Earth's shadow, causing the Moon to be darkened. A partial lunar eclipse occurs when one part of the Moon is in the Earth's umbra, while the other part is in the Earth's penumbra. Unlike a solar eclipse, which can only be viewed from a relatively small area of the world, a lunar eclipse may be viewed from anywhere on the night side of Earth. Occurring about 5.7 days after apogee (on July 1, 1963, at 6:30 UTC), the Moon's apparent diameter was smaller.

== Visibility ==
The eclipse was completely visible over Africa, much of Europe, the Middle East, and Antarctica, seen rising over eastern North America, South America, and western Europe and setting over much of Asia and Australia.

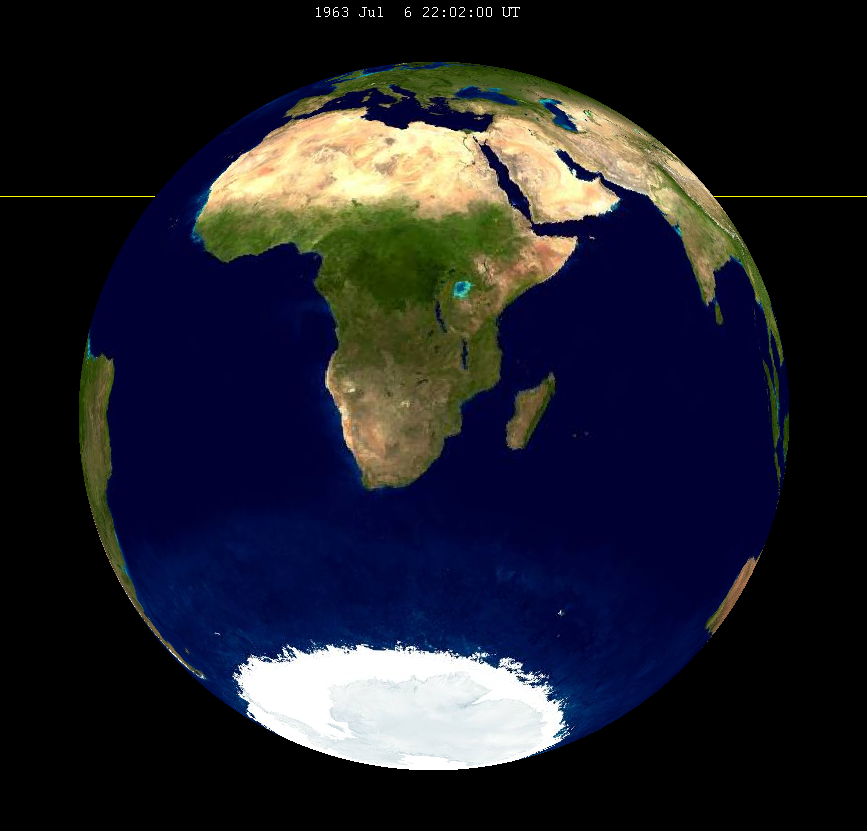
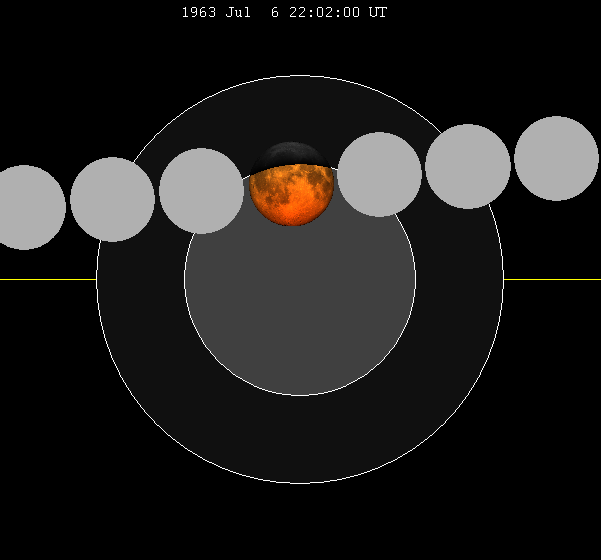

== Eclipse details ==
Shown below is a table displaying details about this particular lunar eclipse. It describes various parameters pertaining to this eclipse.

July 6, 1963 Lunar Eclipse Parameters
Parameter	Value
Penumbral Magnitude	1.73601
Umbral Magnitude	0.70602
Gamma	0.61972
Sun Right Ascension	07h01m15.5s
Sun Declination	+22°41'46.3"
Sun Semi-Diameter	15'43.9"
Sun Equatorial Horizontal Parallax	08.6"
Moon Right Ascension	19h01m14.6s
Moon Declination	-22°07'02.3"
Moon Semi-Diameter	15'16.4"
Moon Equatorial Horizontal Parallax	0°56'03.2"
ΔT	34.8 s

== Eclipse season ==
This eclipse is part of an eclipse season, a period, roughly every six months, when eclipses occur. Only two (or occasionally three) eclipse seasons occur each year, and each season lasts about 35 days and repeats just short of six months (173 days) later; thus two full eclipse seasons always occur each year. Either two or three eclipses happen each eclipse season. In the sequence below, each eclipse is separated by a fortnight.

Eclipse season of July 1963
July 6 Descending node (full moon)	July 20 Ascending node (new moon)
Partial lunar eclipse Lunar Saros 119	Total solar eclipse Solar Saros 145

== Related eclipses ==
=== Eclipses in 1963 ===
- A penumbral lunar eclipse on January 9.
- An annular solar eclipse on January 25.
- A partial lunar eclipse on July 6.
- A total solar eclipse on July 20.
- A total lunar eclipse on December 30.

=== Metonic ===
- Preceded by: Lunar eclipse of September 17, 1959
- Followed by: Lunar eclipse of April 24, 1967

=== Tzolkinex ===
- Preceded by: Lunar eclipse of May 24, 1956
- Followed by: Lunar eclipse of August 17, 1970

=== Half-Saros ===
- Preceded by: Solar eclipse of June 30, 1954
- Followed by: Solar eclipse of July 10, 1972

=== Tritos ===
- Preceded by: Lunar eclipse of August 5, 1952
- Followed by: Lunar eclipse of June 4, 1974

=== Lunar Saros 119 ===
- Preceded by: Lunar eclipse of June 25, 1945
- Followed by: Lunar eclipse of July 17, 1981

=== Inex ===
- Preceded by: Lunar eclipse of July 26, 1934
- Followed by: Lunar eclipse of June 15, 1992

=== Triad ===
- Preceded by: Lunar eclipse of September 3, 1876
- Followed by: Lunar eclipse of May 6, 2050

=== Lunar eclipses of 1962–1965 ===
This eclipse is a member of a semester series. An eclipse in a semester series of lunar eclipses repeats approximately every 177 days and 4 hours (a semester) at alternating nodes of the Moon's orbit.

The penumbral lunar eclipses on February 19, 1962 and August 15, 1962 occur in the previous lunar year eclipse set.

Lunar eclipse series sets from 1962 to 1965
Descending node				Ascending node			
Saros	Date Viewing	Type Chart	Gamma	Saros	Date Viewing	Type Chart	Gamma
109	1962 Jul 17	Penumbral	1.3371	114	1963 Jan 09	Penumbral	−1.0128
119	1963 Jul 06	Partial	0.6197	124	1963 Dec 30	Total	−0.2889
129	1964 Jun 25	Total	−0.1461	134	1964 Dec 19	Total	0.3801
139	1965 Jun 14	Partial	−0.9006	144	1965 Dec 08	Penumbral	1.0775

=== Saros 119 ===
This eclipse is a part of Saros series 119, repeating every 18 years, 11 days, and containing 82 events. The series started with a penumbral lunar eclipse on October 14, 935 AD. It contains partial eclipses from May 18, 1296 through August 2, 1422; total eclipses from August 13, 1440 through June 15, 1927; and a second set of partial eclipses from June 25, 1945 through August 19, 2035. The series ends at member 82 as a penumbral eclipse on March 25, 2396.

The longest duration of totality was produced by member 49 at 102 minutes, 6 seconds on March 30, 1801. All eclipses in this series occur at the Moon’s descending node of orbit.

Greatest	First			
The greatest eclipse of the series occurred on 1801 Mar 30, lasting 102 minutes, 6 seconds.	Penumbral	Partial	Total	Central
The greatest eclipse of the series occurred on 1801 Mar 30, lasting 102 minutes, 6 seconds.	934 Oct 14	1296 May 18	1440 Aug 13	1512 Sep 25
The greatest eclipse of the series occurred on 1801 Mar 30, lasting 102 minutes, 6 seconds.	Last			
The greatest eclipse of the series occurred on 1801 Mar 30, lasting 102 minutes, 6 seconds.	Central	Total	Partial	Penumbral
The greatest eclipse of the series occurred on 1801 Mar 30, lasting 102 minutes, 6 seconds.	1873 May 12	1927 Jun 15	2035 Aug 19	2396 Mar 25

Eclipses are tabulated in three columns; every third eclipse in the same column is one exeligmos apart, so they all cast shadows over approximately the same parts of the Earth.

Series members 49–71 occur between 1801 and 2200:
49	50	51
1801 Mar 30	1819 Apr 10	1837 Apr 20
52	53	54
1855 May 02	1873 May 12	1891 May 23
55	56	57
1909 Jun 04	1927 Jun 15	1945 Jun 25
58	59	60
1963 Jul 06	1981 Jul 17	1999 Jul 28
61	62	63
2017 Aug 07	2035 Aug 19	2053 Aug 29
64	65	66
2071 Sep 09	2089 Sep 19	2107 Oct 02
67	68	69
2125 Oct 12	2143 Oct 23	2161 Nov 03
70	71	
2179 Nov 14	2197 Nov 24	

=== Tritos series ===
This eclipse is a part of a tritos cycle, repeating at alternating nodes every 135 synodic months (≈ 3986.63 days, or 11 years minus 1 month). Their appearance and longitude are irregular due to a lack of synchronization with the anomalistic month (period of perigee), but groupings of 3 tritos cycles (≈ 33 years minus 3 months) come close (≈ 434.044 anomalistic months), so eclipses are similar in these groupings.

Series members between 1801 and 2200
1810 Sep 13 (Saros 105)	1821 Aug 13 (Saros 106)	1832 Jul 12 (Saros 107)	1843 Jun 12 (Saros 108)	1854 May 12 (Saros 109)
1865 Apr 11 (Saros 110)	1876 Mar 10 (Saros 111)	1887 Feb 08 (Saros 112)	1898 Jan 08 (Saros 113)	1908 Dec 07 (Saros 114)
1919 Nov 07 (Saros 115)	1930 Oct 07 (Saros 116)	1941 Sep 05 (Saros 117)	1952 Aug 05 (Saros 118)	1963 Jul 06 (Saros 119)
1974 Jun 04 (Saros 120)	1985 May 04 (Saros 121)	1996 Apr 04 (Saros 122)	2007 Mar 03 (Saros 123)	2018 Jan 31 (Saros 124)
2028 Dec 31 (Saros 125)	2039 Nov 30 (Saros 126)	2050 Oct 30 (Saros 127)	2061 Sep 29 (Saros 128)	2072 Aug 28 (Saros 129)
2083 Jul 29 (Saros 130)	2094 Jun 28 (Saros 131)	2105 May 28 (Saros 132)	2116 Apr 27 (Saros 133)	2127 Mar 28 (Saros 134)
2138 Feb 24 (Saros 135)	2149 Jan 23 (Saros 136)	2159 Dec 24 (Saros 137)	2170 Nov 23 (Saros 138)	2181 Oct 22 (Saros 139)
2192 Sep 21 (Saros 140)

=== Inex series ===
This eclipse is a part of the long period inex cycle, repeating at alternating nodes, every 358 synodic months (≈ 10,571.95 days, or 29 years minus 20 days). Their appearance and longitude are irregular due to a lack of synchronization with the anomalistic month (period of perigee). However, groupings of 3 inex cycles (≈ 87 years minus 2 months) comes close (≈ 1,151.02 anomalistic months), so eclipses are similar in these groupings.

Series members between 1801 and 2200
1818 Oct 14 (Saros 114)	1847 Sep 24 (Saros 115)	1876 Sep 03 (Saros 116)
1905 Aug 15 (Saros 117)	1934 Jul 26 (Saros 118)	1963 Jul 06 (Saros 119)
1992 Jun 15 (Saros 120)	2021 May 26 (Saros 121)	2050 May 06 (Saros 122)
2079 Apr 16 (Saros 123)	2108 Mar 27 (Saros 124)	2137 Mar 07 (Saros 125)
2166 Feb 15 (Saros 126)	2195 Jan 26 (Saros 127)	

=== Half-Saros cycle ===
A lunar eclipse will be preceded and followed by solar eclipses by 9 years and 5.5 days (a half saros). This lunar eclipse is related to two total solar eclipses of Solar Saros 126.

June 30, 1954	July 10, 1972

== See also ==
- List of lunar eclipses
- List of 20th-century lunar eclipses
