= Solar Saros 127 =

Saros cycle series 127 for solar eclipses

Saros 127

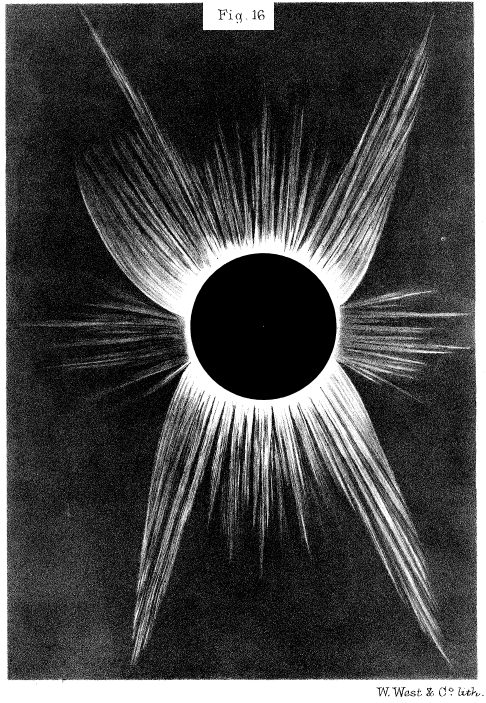
April 6, 1875 Series member 50

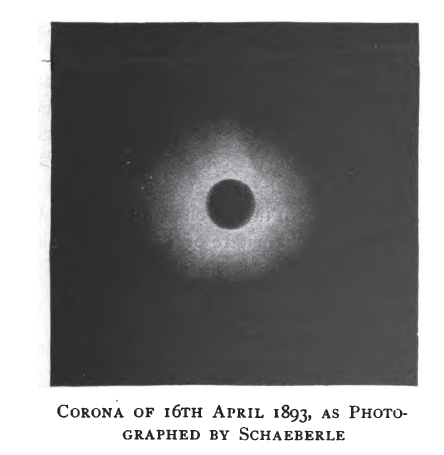
April 16, 1893 Series member 51

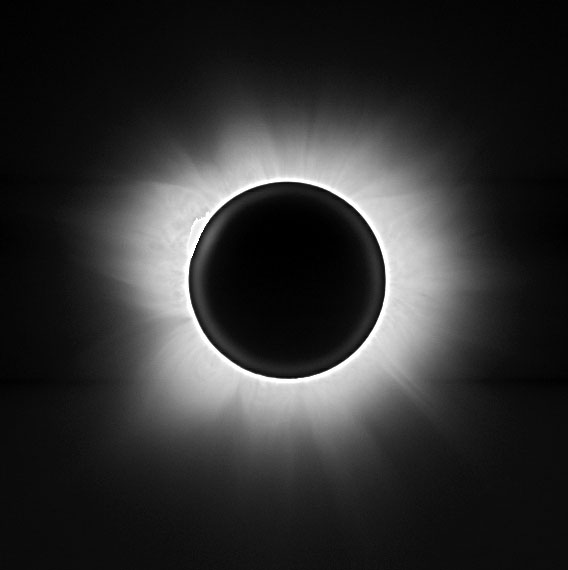
Total Solar eclipse of June 21, 2001, viewed in Lusaka, Zambia by the Williams College eclipse expedition. Series member 57

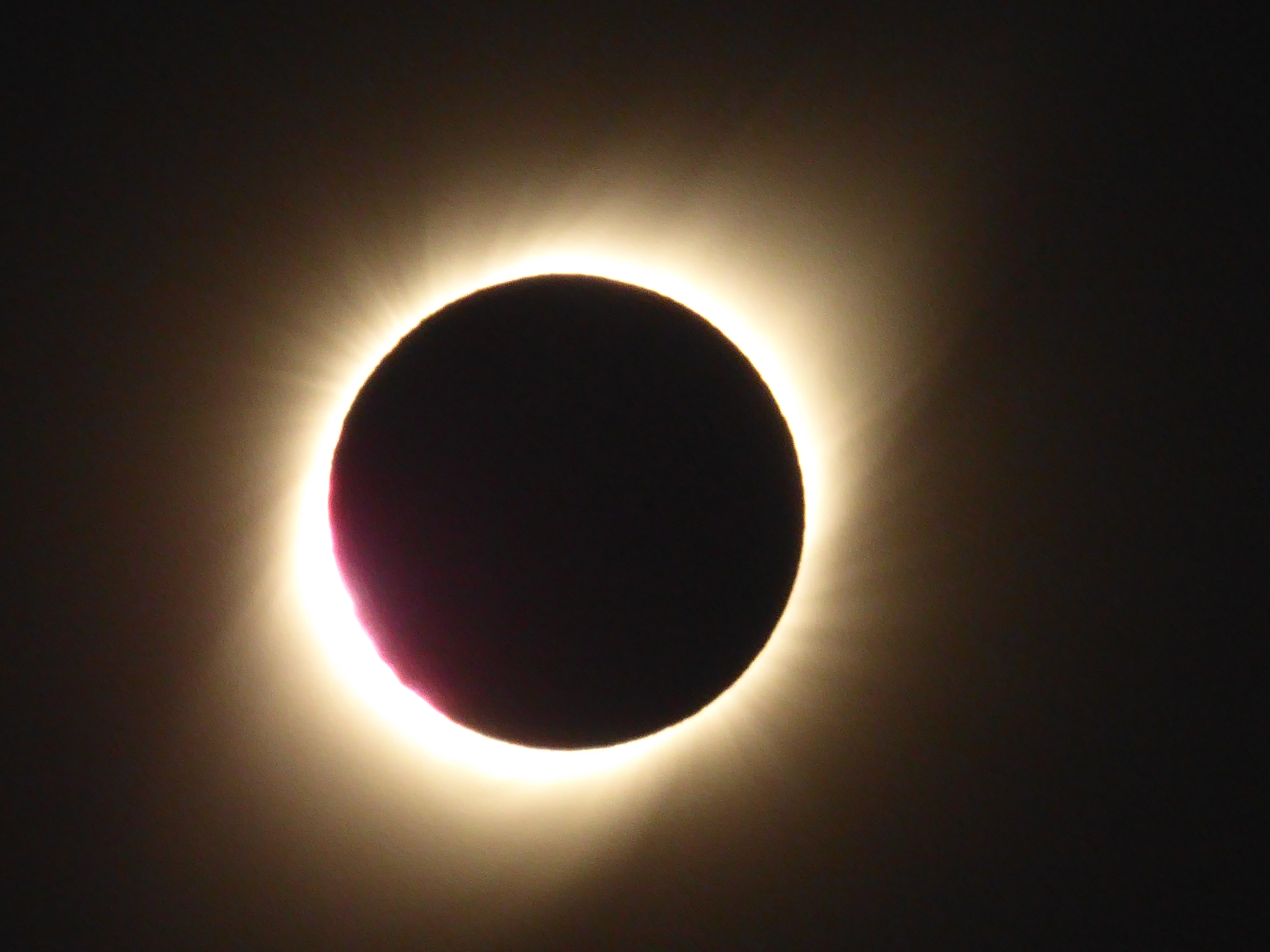
Total Solar eclipse of July 2, 2019, from La Serena, Chile Series member 58

Saros cycle series 127 for solar eclipses occurs at the Moon's ascending node, repeating every 18 years, 11 days, containing 82 eclipses, 42 of which are umbral (all total). The first eclipse in the series was on 10 October 991 and the last will be on 21 March 2452. The most recent eclipse was a total eclipse on 2 July 2019 and the next will be a total eclipse on 13 July 2037.

The longest totality was 5 minutes 40 seconds on 30 August 1532.

This solar saros is linked to Lunar Saros 120.

== Umbral eclipses ==
Umbral eclipses (annular, total and hybrid) can be further classified as either: 1) Central (two limits), 2) Central (one limit) or 3) Non-Central (one limit). The statistical distribution of these classes in Saros series 127 appears in the following table.

Classification	Number	Percent
All Umbral eclipses	42	100.00%
Central (two limits)	42	100.00%
Central (one limit)	0	0.00%
Non-central (one limit)	0	0.00%

== All eclipses ==
Note: Dates are given in the Julian calendar prior to 15 October 1582, and in the Gregorian calendar after that.

Saros	Member	Date	Time (Greatest) UTC	Type	Location Lat, Long	Gamma	Mag.	Width (km)	Duration (min:sec)	Ref
127	1	October 10, 991	14:31:21	Partial	71.5N 28.4E	1.537	0.0321			
127	2	October 20, 1009	22:36:10	Partial	70.9N 106.7W	1.5123	0.0753			
127	3	November 1, 1027	6:48:58	Partial	70.1N 116.7E	1.493	0.1088			
127	4	November 11, 1045	15:09:04	Partial	69.1N 21W	1.4792	0.1328			
127	5	November 22, 1063	23:33:39	Partial	68.1N 159.2W	1.4681	0.1517			
127	6	December 3, 1081	8:03:27	Partial	67N 62E	1.4607	0.1642			
127	7	December 14, 1099	16:35:04	Partial	65.9N 76.8W	1.4537	0.1757			
127	8	December 25, 1117	1:07:37	Partial	64.9N 144.7E	1.4469	0.1867			
127	9	January 5, 1136	9:38:55	Partial	63.9N 6.9E	1.4383	0.201			
127	10	January 15, 1154	18:08:17	Partial	63.1N 130.1W	1.4274	0.2192			
127	11	January 27, 1172	2:33:05	Partial	62.4N 94.3E	1.4121	0.2453			
127	12	February 6, 1190	10:53:04	Partial	61.8N 39.8W	1.3921	0.2801			
127	13	February 17, 1208	19:06:58	Partial	61.3N 172.3W	1.3664	0.3257			
127	14	February 28, 1226	3:15:05	Partial	61N 56.8E	1.3351	0.3818			
127	15	March 10, 1244	11:14:43	Partial	60.9N 72W	1.2963	0.4525			
127	16	March 21, 1262	19:08:33	Partial	61N 160.7E	1.2522	0.5339			
127	17	April 1, 1280	2:54:21	Partial	61.2N 35.4E	1.2008	0.6298			
127	18	April 12, 1298	10:35:28	Partial	61.5N 88.9W	1.1445	0.7357			
127	19	April 22, 1316	18:08:42	Partial	62N 148.8E	1.0812	0.856			
127	20	May 4, 1334	1:39:14	Partial	62.6N 27E	1.0149	0.983			
127	21	May 14, 1352	9:04:24	Total	73.6N 48.5W	0.9437	1.0427	441	2m 18s	
127	22	May 25, 1370	16:28:30	Total	76.2N 124W	0.8708	1.0497	338	2m 51s	
127	23	June 4, 1388	23:49:27	Total	74.2N 156.6E	0.7944	1.0552	302	3m 20s	
127	24	June 16, 1406	7:12:01	Total	69.4N 64.4E	0.7188	1.0596	283	3m 48s	
127	25	June 26, 1424	14:34:25	Total	63.1N 36.6W	0.6425	1.0629	270	4m 14s	
127	26	July 7, 1442	21:59:40	Total	56.2N 143.3W	0.5679	1.0654	261	4m 39s	
127	27	July 18, 1460	5:27:53	Total	48.9N 106.4E	0.4954	1.0669	252	5m 0s	
127	28	July 29, 1478	13:01:17	Total	41.4N 6.8W	0.4269	1.0676	244	5m 18s	
127	29	August 8, 1496	20:40:14	Total	33.9N 122.4W	0.3626	1.0675	236	5m 30s	
127	30	August 20, 1514	4:25:15	Total	26.5N 119.9E	0.3032	1.0667	228	5m 38s	
127	31	August 30, 1532	12:17:45	Total	19.3N 0E	0.25	1.0654	221	5m 40s	
127	32	September 10, 1550	20:17:38	Total	12.4N 121.8W	0.2029	1.0636	212	5m 38s	
127	33	September 21, 1568	4:25:02	Total	5.8N 114.6E	0.1619	1.0615	204	5m 32s	
127	34	October 12, 1586	12:40:32	Total	0.3S 10.8W	0.1278	1.0591	196	5m 23s	
127	35	October 22, 1604	21:03:48	Total	5.9S 137.8W	0.1	1.0567	188	5m 12s	
127	36	November 3, 1622	5:34:48	Total	10.7S 93.7E	0.0789	1.0544	180	5m 1s	
127	37	November 13, 1640	14:11:19	Total	14.8S 35.8W	0.0623	1.0522	173	4m 50s	
127	38	November 24, 1658	22:54:42	Total	18S 166.4W	0.0513	1.0502	167	4m 40s	
127	39	December 5, 1676	7:42:08	Total	20.2S 62.5E	0.0435	1.0486	162	4m 30s	
127	40	December 16, 1694	16:33:11	Total	21.3S 69.2W	0.0388	1.0475	158	4m 22s	
127	41	December 28, 1712	1:24:55	Total	21.5S 159E	0.0346	1.0466	155	4m 15s	
127	42	January 8, 1731	10:17:44	Total	20.7S 27E	0.0313	1.0464	155	4m 10s	
127	43	January 18, 1749	19:08:56	Total	19.1S 104.9W	0.0264	1.0465	155	4m 7s	
127	44	January 30, 1767	3:56:55	Total	16.8S 123.9E	0.019	1.0471	157	4m 6s	
127	45	February 9, 1785	12:40:41	Total	14.1S 6.6W	0.008	1.048	159	4m 7s	
127	46	February 21, 1803	21:18:46	Total	11.1S 135.9W	-0.0075	1.0492	163	4m 9s	
127	47	March 4, 1821	5:50:13	Total	8S 96.3E	-0.0284	1.0506	168	4m 14s	
127	48	March 15, 1839	14:13:42	Total	5.1S 29.5W	-0.0558	1.052	172	4m 20s	
127	49	March 25, 1857	22:29:38	Total	2.4S 153.4W	-0.0892	1.0534	177	4m 28s	
127	50	April 6, 1875	6:37:26	Total	0.2S 84.8E	-0.1292	1.0547	182	4m 37s	
127	51	April 16, 1893	14:36:11	Total	1.3N 34.6W	-0.1764	1.0556	186	4m 47s	
127	52	April 28, 1911	22:27:22	Total	1.9N 151.9W	-0.2294	1.0562	190	4m 57s	
127	53	May 9, 1929	6:10:34	Total	1.6N 92.7E	-0.2887	1.0562	193	5m 7s	
127	54	May 20, 1947	13:47:47	Total	0.2N 21.4W	-0.3528	1.0557	196	5m 13s	
127	55	May 30, 1965	21:17:31	Total	2.5S 133.8W	-0.4225	1.0544	198	5m 15s	
127	56	June 11, 1983	4:43:33	Total	6.2S 114.2E	-0.4947	1.0524	199	5m 11s	
127	57	June 21, 2001	12:04:46	Total	11.3S 2.7E	-0.5701	1.0495	200	4m 57s	
127	58	July 2, 2019	19:24:08	Total	17.4S 109W	-0.6466	1.0459	201	4m 33s	
127	59	July 13, 2037	2:40:36	Total	24.8S 139.1E	-0.7246	1.0413	201	3m 58s	
127	60	July 24, 2055	9:57:50	Total	33.3S 25.8E	-0.8012	1.0359	202	3m 17s	
127	61	August 3, 2073	17:15:23	Total	43.2S 89.4W	-0.8763	1.0294	206	2m 29s	
127	62	August 15, 2091	0:34:43	Total	55.6S 150.5E	-0.949	1.0216	236	1m 38s	
127	63	August 26, 2109	7:57:26	Partial	71.4S 5.1E	-1.0178	0.967			
127	64	September 6, 2127	15:24:17	Partial	71.9S 120.1W	-1.0822	0.8458			
127	65	September 16, 2145	22:57:10	Partial	72.1S 112.8E	-1.1406	0.7368			
127	66	September 28, 2163	6:34:34	Partial	72.1S 15.6W	-1.1943	0.6377			
127	67	October 8, 2181	14:19:36	Partial	71.9S 145.8W	-1.2408	0.5529			
127	68	October 19, 2199	22:10:26	Partial	71.4S 82.9E	-1.2817	0.479			
127	69	October 31, 2217	6:08:54	Partial	70.7S 49.8W	-1.3157	0.4185			
127	70	November 11, 2235	14:13:08	Partial	69.9S 176.6E	-1.3444	0.3682			
127	71	November 21, 2253	22:24:38	Partial	68.9S 41.9E	-1.3666	0.3297			
127	72	December 3, 2271	6:40:47	Partial	67.8S 93.4W	-1.3843	0.2996			
127	73	December 13, 2289	15:01:18	Partial	66.8S 130.8E	-1.3979	0.2767			
127	74	December 25, 2307	23:24:23	Partial	65.7S 5.1W	-1.4089	0.2585			
127	75	January 5, 2326	7:49:43	Partial	64.7S 141.2W	-1.4177	0.244			
127	76	January 16, 2344	16:13:41	Partial	63.8S 83.5E	-1.427	0.2288			
127	77	January 27, 2362	0:36:00	Partial	62.9S 51.1W	-1.4368	0.2125			
127	78	February 7, 2380	8:54:01	Partial	62.2S 175.7E	-1.4496	0.1909			
127	79	February 17, 2398	17:08:14	Partial	61.7S 43.5E	-1.4648	0.165			
127	80	February 29, 2416	1:13:31	Partial	61.3S 86.2W	-1.4865	0.1279			
127	81	March 11, 2434	9:12:47	Partial	61.1S 145.6E	-1.5121	0.0837			
127	82	March 21, 2452	17:01:31	Partial	61.1S 20.1E	-1.5455	0.0262			
