= April 2014 lunar eclipse =

Total lunar eclipse

- Total eclipse
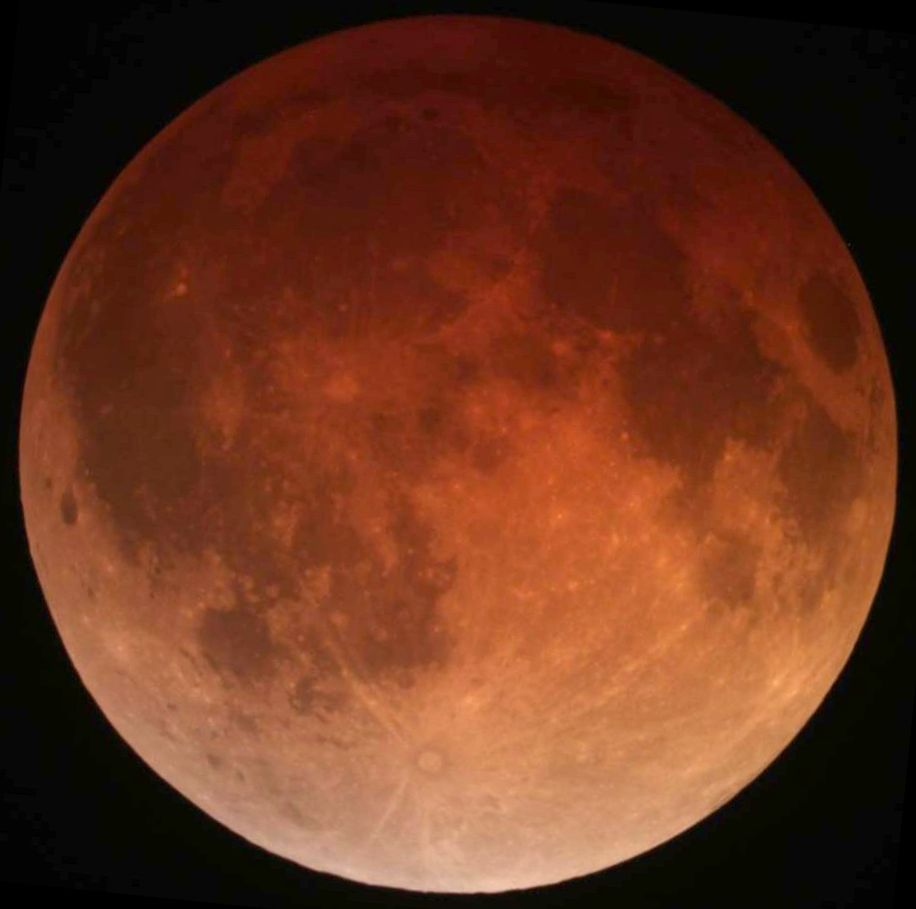
- Totality as viewed from Lomita, California, 7:44 UTC
- Date: April 15, 2014
- Gamma: −0.3017
- Magnitude: 1.2918
- Saros cycle: 122 (56 of 75)
- Totality: 77 minutes, 48 seconds
- Partiality: 214 minutes, 43 seconds
- Penumbral: 343 minutes, 53 seconds
Contacts (UTC)
- P1: 4:53:40
- U1: 5:58:19
- U2: 7:06:46
- Greatest: 7:45:39
- U3: 8:24:34
- U4: 9:33:02
- P4: 10:37:33

A total lunar eclipse occurred at the Moon’s ascending node of orbit on Tuesday, April 15, 2014, with an umbral magnitude of 1.2918. A lunar eclipse occurs when the Moon moves into the Earth's shadow, causing the Moon to be darkened. A total lunar eclipse occurs when the Moon's near side entirely passes into the Earth's umbral shadow. Unlike a solar eclipse, which can only be viewed from a relatively small area of the world, a lunar eclipse may be viewed from anywhere on the night side of Earth. A total lunar eclipse can last up to nearly two hours, while a total solar eclipse lasts only a few minutes at any given place, because the Moon's shadow is smaller. The Moon's apparent diameter was near the average diameter because it occurred 6.9 days after apogee (on April 8, 2014, at 10:50 UTC) and 7.6 days before perigee (on April 22, 2014, at 20:20 UTC).

This lunar eclipse is the first of a tetrad, with four total lunar eclipses in series, the others being on October 8, 2014; April 4, 2015; and September 28, 2015.

== Background ==
A lunar eclipse occurs when the Moon passes within Earth's umbra (shadow). As the eclipse begins, the Earth's shadow first darkens the Moon slightly. Then, the shadow begins to "cover" part of the Moon, turning it a dark red-brown color (typically - the color can vary based on atmospheric conditions). The Moon appears to be reddish because of Rayleigh scattering (the same effect that causes sunsets to appear reddish) and the refraction of that light by the Earth's atmosphere into its umbra.

The following simulation shows the approximate appearance of the Moon passing through the Earth's shadow. The Moon's brightness is exaggerated within the umbral shadow. The northern portion of the Moon was closest to the center of the shadow, making it darkest, and most red in appearance.

Simulation of the appearance of the Moon just before, during and just after the eclipse

== Description ==
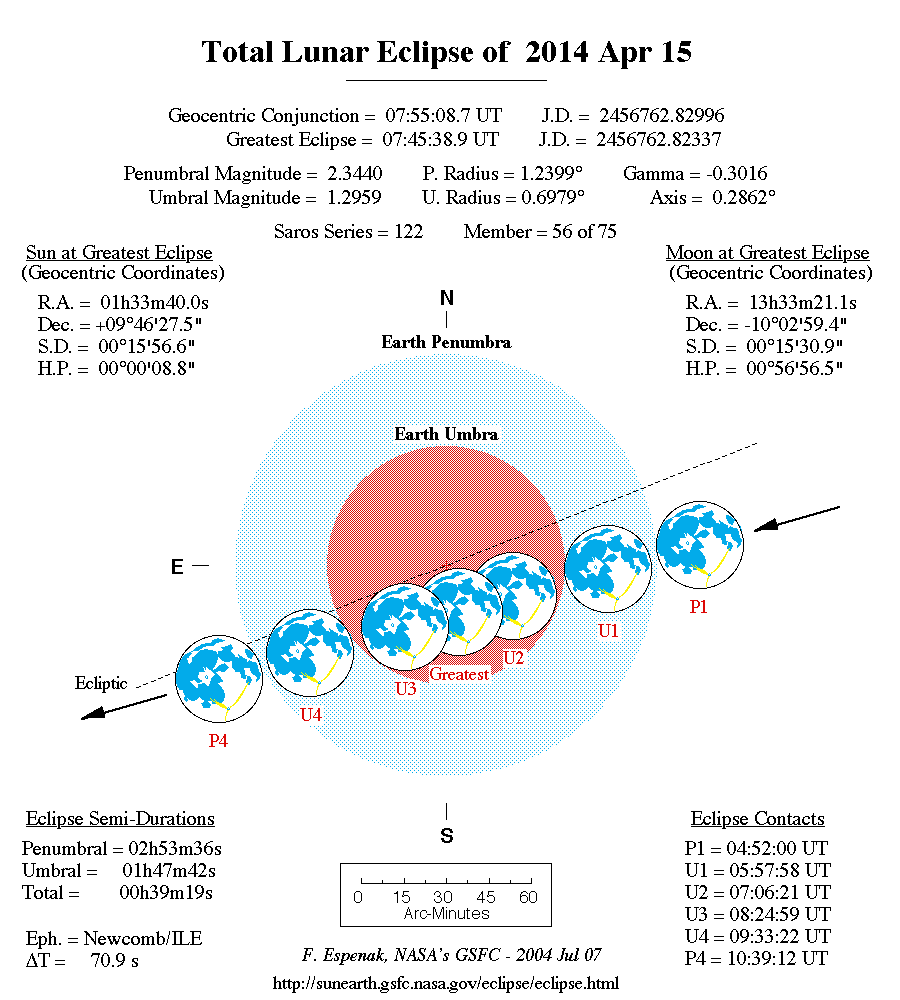
NASA chart of the eclipse

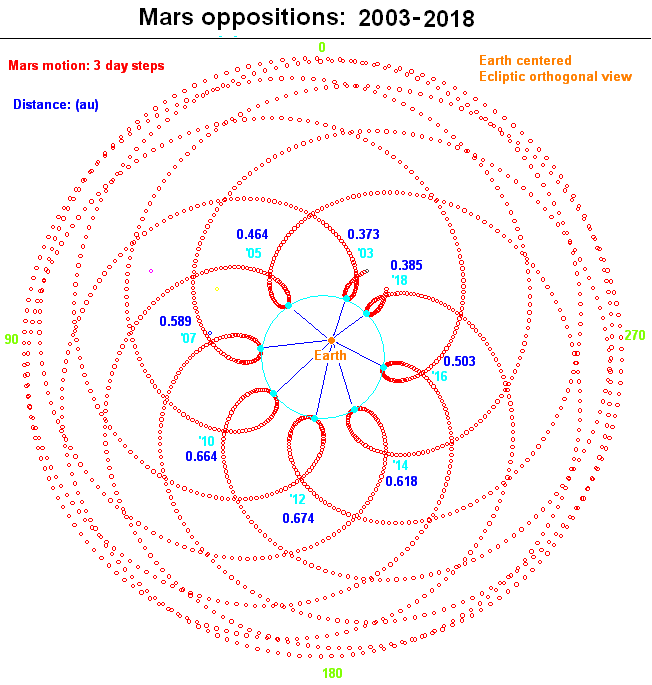
The planet Mars was near opposition, as shown in this geo-centered motion of Mars from 2003 to 2018.

On April 15, 2014, the Moon passed through the southern part of the Earth's umbral shadow. It was visible over most of the western hemisphere, including eastern Australia, New Zealand, the Pacific Ocean, and the Americas. In the western Pacific, the first half of the eclipse occurred before moonrise. In Europe and Africa, the eclipse began just before moonset. Mars, which had just passed its opposition, appeared at magnitude -1.5 about 9.5° northwest of the Moon. Spica was 2° to the west, while Arcturus was 32° north. Saturn was 26° east and Antares 44° southeast.

The Moon entered Earth's penumbral shadow at 4:53:40 UTC and the umbral shadow at 5:58:19. Totality lasted for 1 hour 17.8 minutes, from 7:06:46 to 8:24:34. The moment of greatest eclipse occurred at 7:45:39. At that point, the Moon's zenith was approximately 3,000 kilometres (1,900 mi) southwest of the Galápagos Islands. The Moon left the umbral shadow at 9:33:02 and the penumbral shadow at 10:37:33.

The peak umbral magnitude was 1.29177, at which moment the northern part of the moon was 1.7 arc-minutes south of the center of Earth's shadow, while the southern part was 40.0 arc-minutes from center. The gamma of the eclipse was −0.3017.

The eclipse was a member of Lunar Saros 122. It was the 56th such eclipse.

Hourly motion shown right to left	The Moon's hourly motion across the Earth's shadow in the constellation of Virgo, near the star Spica with the planet Mars near, slightly west on the ecliptic.
Visibility map

== Timing ==
Local times of contacts
Time Zone adjustments from UTC		+12_{h}	-9_{h}	-8_{h}	-7_{h}	-6_{h}	-5_{h}	-4_{h}	-3_{h}
Time Zone adjustments from UTC		NZST	HDT	AKDT	PDT	MDT	CDT PET	EDT BOT	ADT AMST ART
Event		Evening 15 April	Evening 14 April					Morning 15 April	
P1	Penumbral begins*	Under Horizon	7:54 pm	8:54 pm	9:54 pm	10:54 pm	11:54 pm	12:54 am	1:54 am
U1	Partial begins	5:58 pm	8:58 pm	9:58 pm	10:58 pm	11:58 pm	12:58 am	1:58 am	2:58 am
U2	Total begins	7:07 pm	10:07 pm	11:07 pm	12:07 am	1:07 am	2:07 am	3:07 am	4:07 am
	Mid-eclipse	7:46 pm	10:46 pm	11:46 pm	12:46 am	1:46 am	2:46 am	3:46 am	4:46 am
U3	Total ends	8:25 pm	11:25 pm	12:25 am	1:25 am	2:25 am	3:25 am	4:25 am	5:25 am
U4	Partial ends	9:33 pm	12:33 am	1:33 am	2:33 am	3:33 am	4:33 am	5:33 am	6:33 am
P4	Penumbral ends	10:38 pm	1:38 am	2:38 am	3:38 am	4:38 am	5:38 am	6:38 am	Set

* The penumbral phase of the eclipse changes the appearance of the Moon only slightly and is generally not noticeable.

Contact points relative to the Earth's umbral and penumbral shadows, here with the Moon near is descending node

The timing of total lunar eclipses are determined by its contacts:
- P1 (First contact): Beginning of the penumbral eclipse. Earth's penumbra touches the Moon's outer limb.
- U1 (Second contact): Beginning of the partial eclipse. Earth's umbra touches the Moon's outer limb.
- U2 (Third contact): Beginning of the total eclipse. The Moon's surface is entirely within Earth's umbra.
- Greatest eclipse: The peak stage of the total eclipse. The Moon is at its closest to the center of Earth's umbra.
- U3 (Fourth contact): End of the total eclipse. The Moon's outer limb exits Earth's umbra.
- U4 (Fifth contact): End of the partial eclipse. Earth's umbra leaves the Moon's surface.
- P4 (Sixth contact): End of the penumbral eclipse. Earth's penumbra no longer makes contact with the Moon.

== Viewing events ==
Many museums and observatories planned special events for the eclipse. The United States National Park Service sponsored events at Great Basin National Park and Sleeping Bear Dunes National Lakeshore. The University of Hawaii's Institute for Astronomy held events at two locations on the islands. The Griffith Observatory in Los Angeles, California streamed the eclipse live on the Internet.

NASA hosted two live question-and-answer sessions online. The first happened roughly 12 hours before the eclipse via Reddit's Ask Me Anything. The second was a web chat hosted on NASA's site just before the eclipse began. NASA also streamed the eclipse live on their website. NASA TV provided 3 hours of live coverage beginning at 2 a.m. EDT.

== Gallery ==
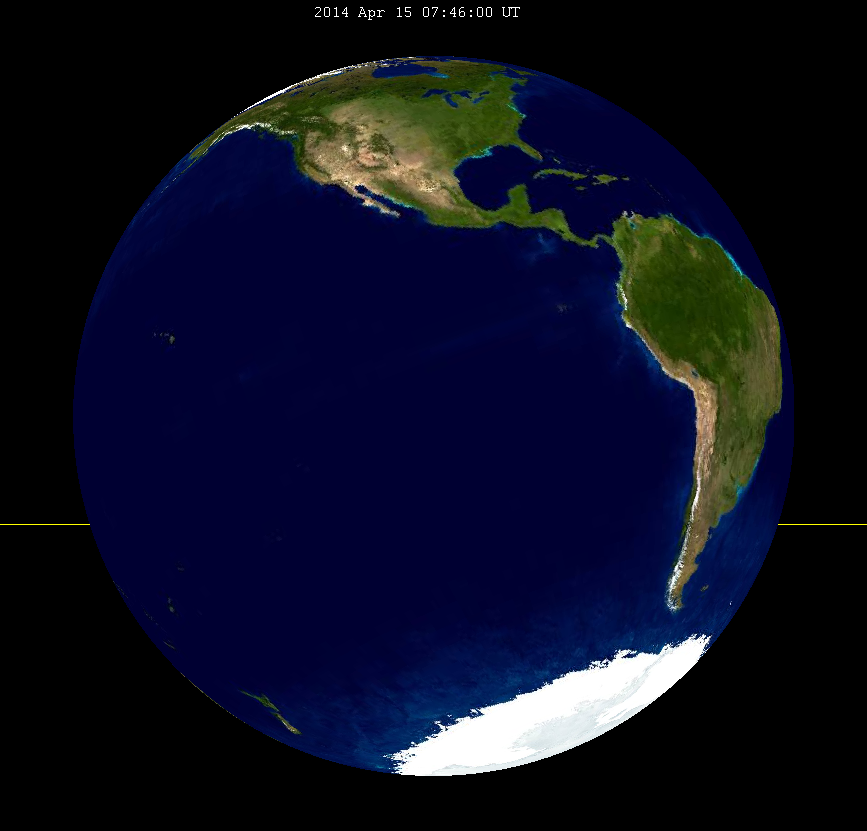
Simulation of Earth from the Moon, 7:47 UTC

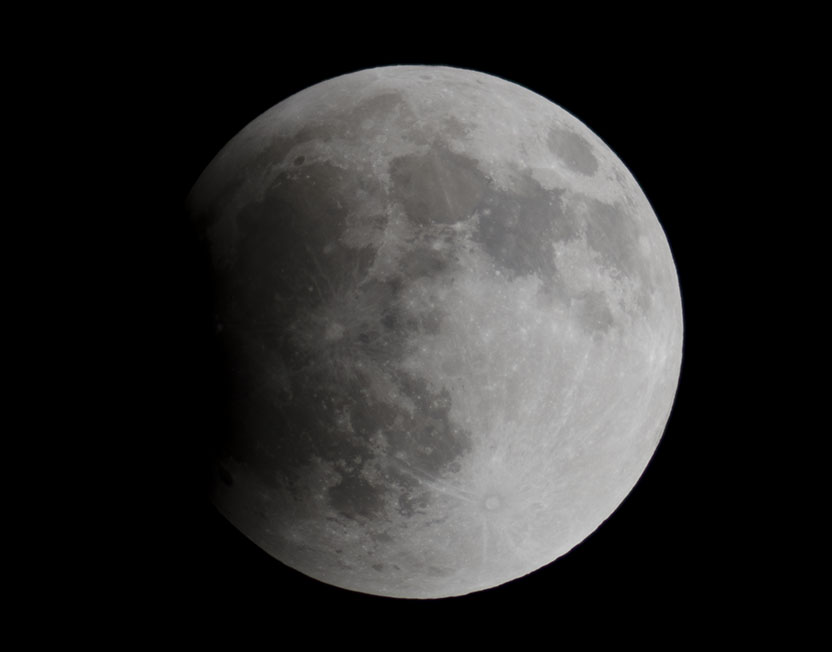
Albuquerque, NM, 6:02 UTC

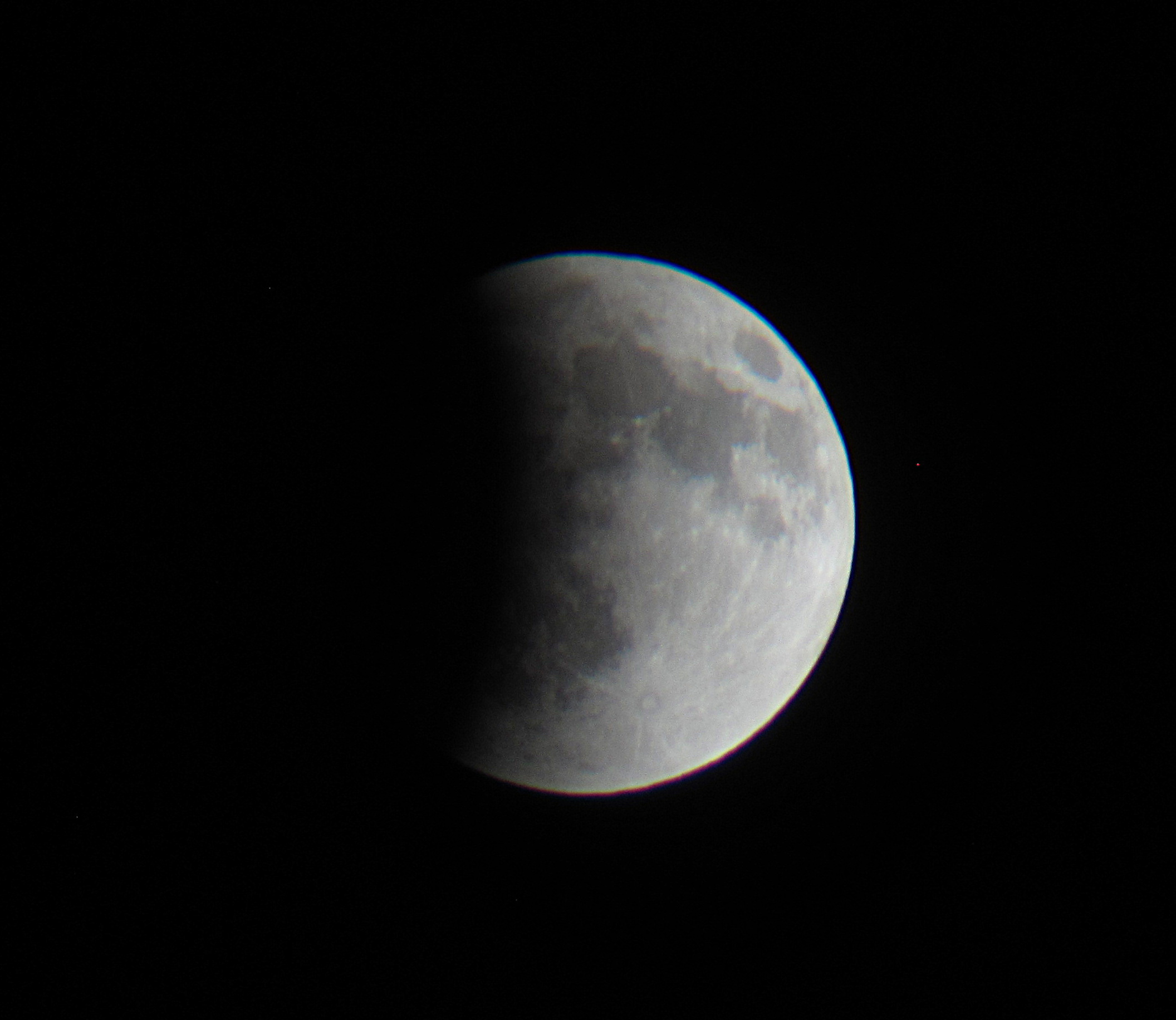
Winnipeg, MB, 6:28 UTC

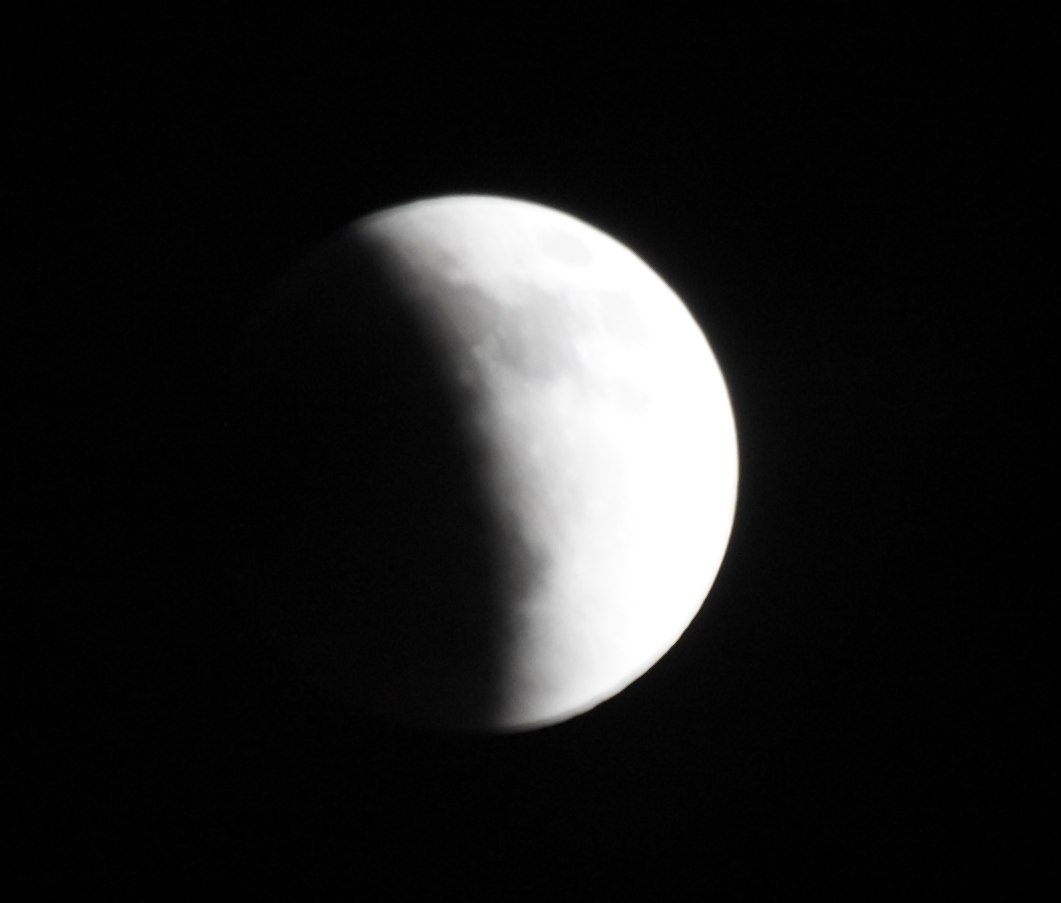
Rosemead, CA, 6:30 UTC

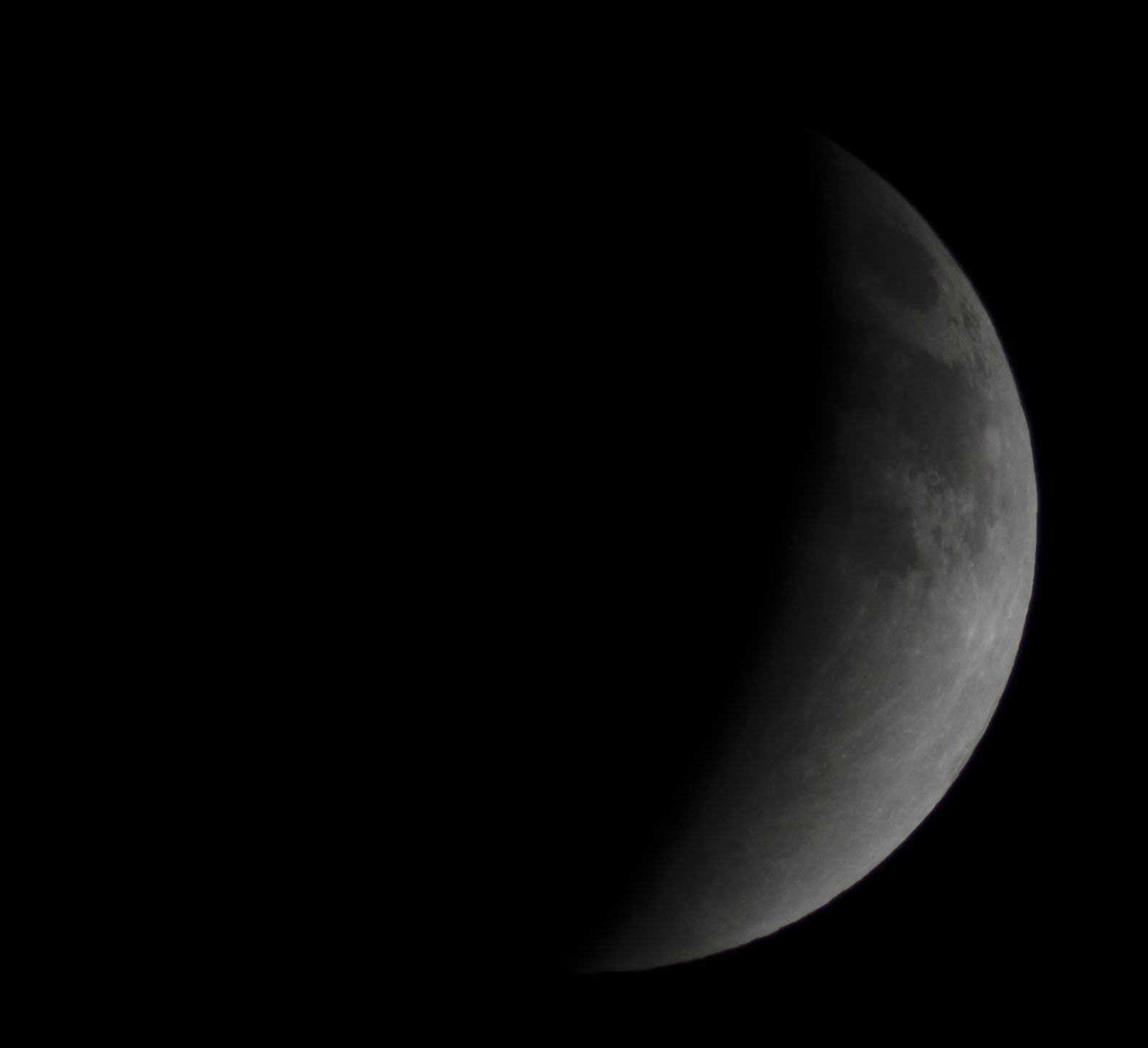
Albuquerque, NM, 6:45 UTC

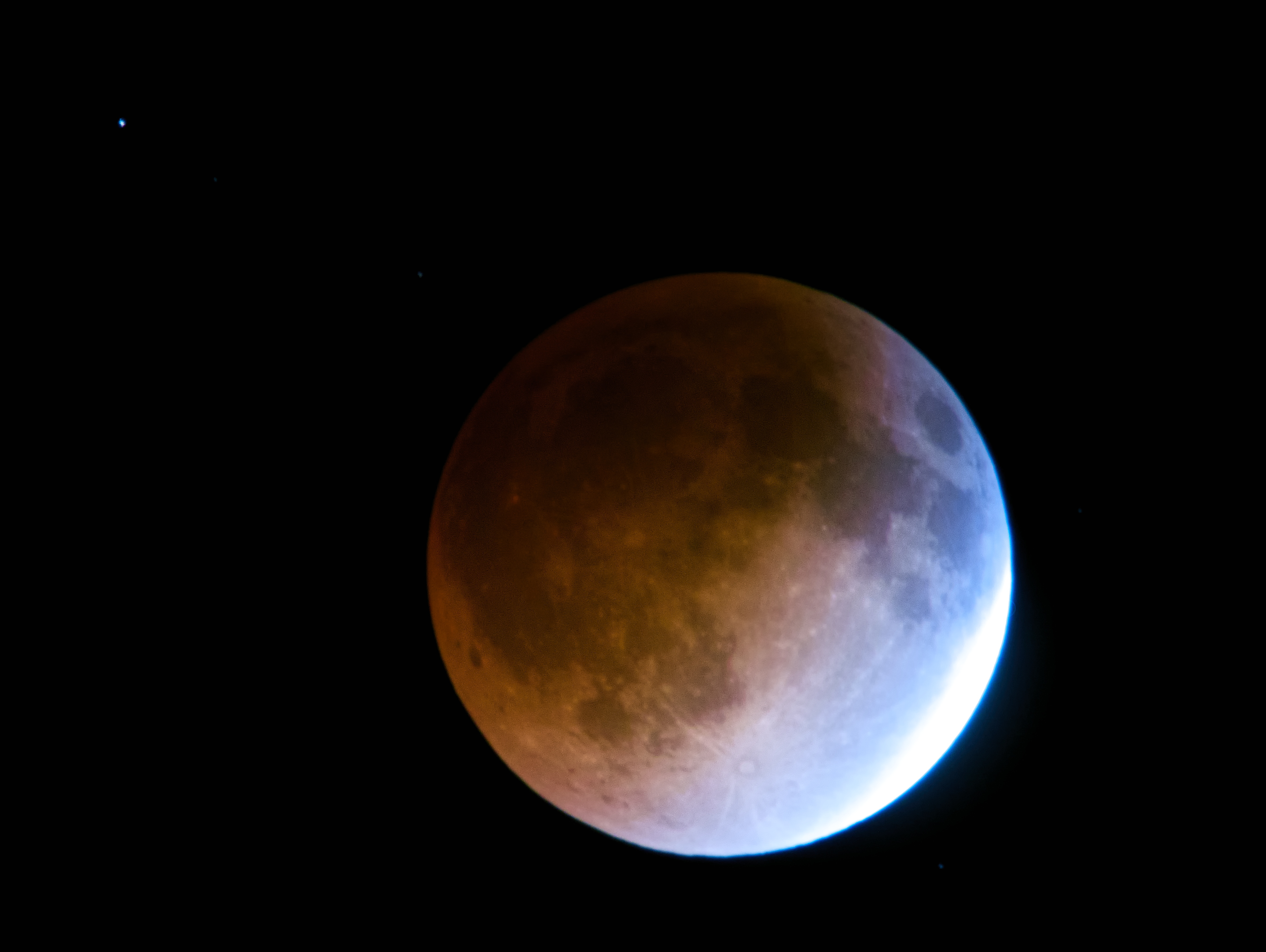
New Braunfels, TX, 7:02 UTC

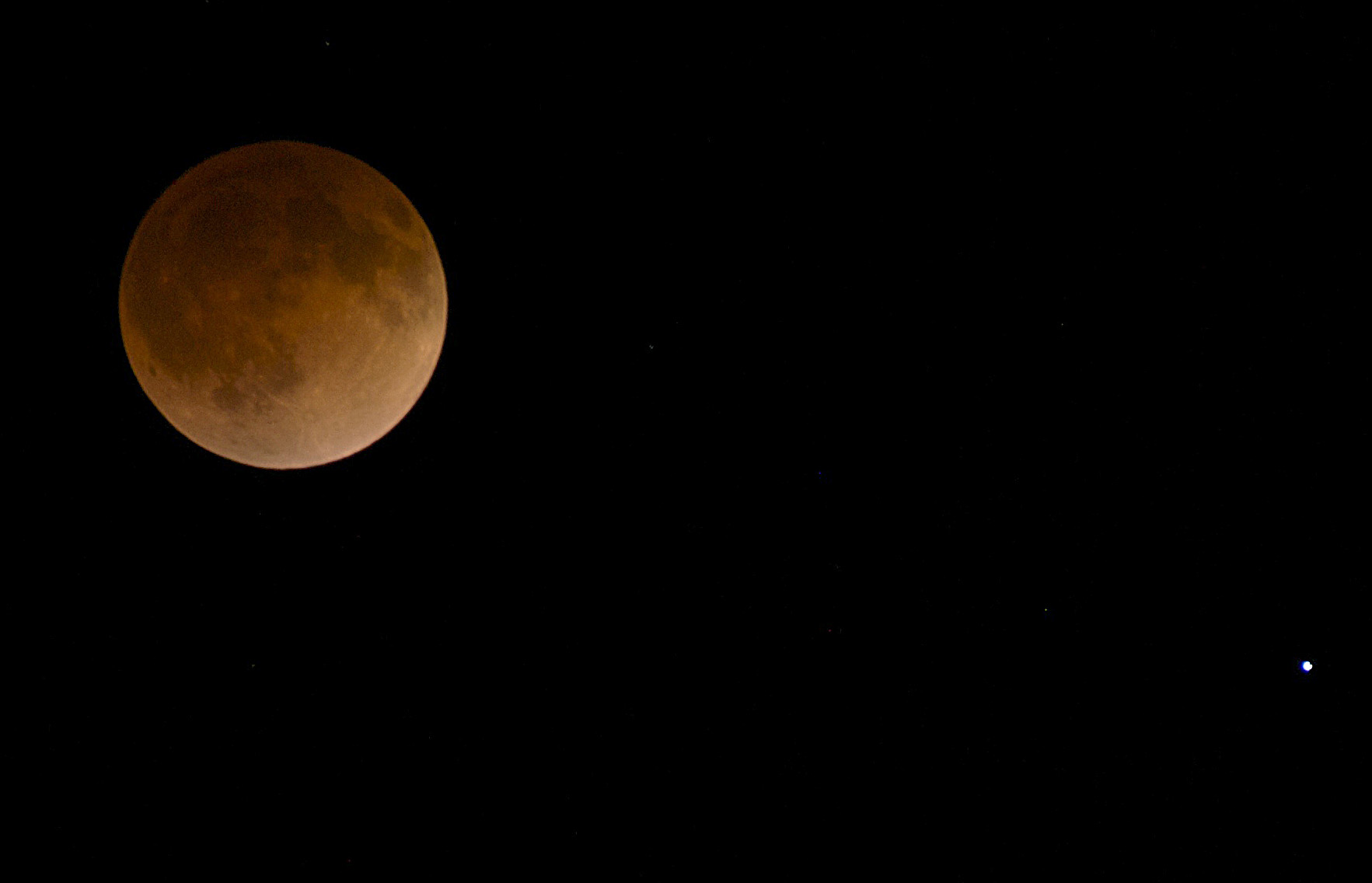
West Valley City, UT, 7:29 UTC
Moon with Spica

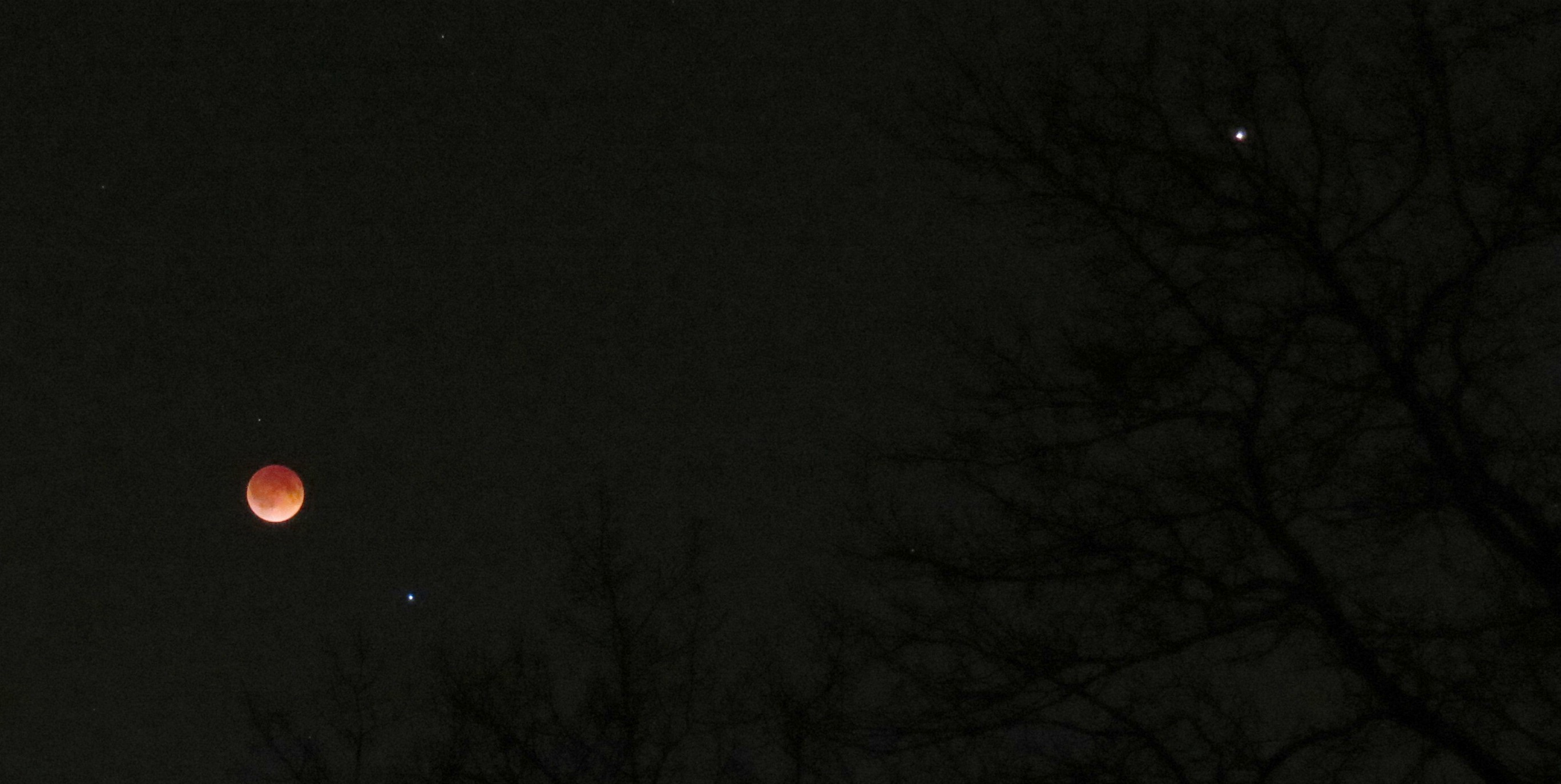
Minneapolis, MN, 7:40 UTC
wide angle with Mars

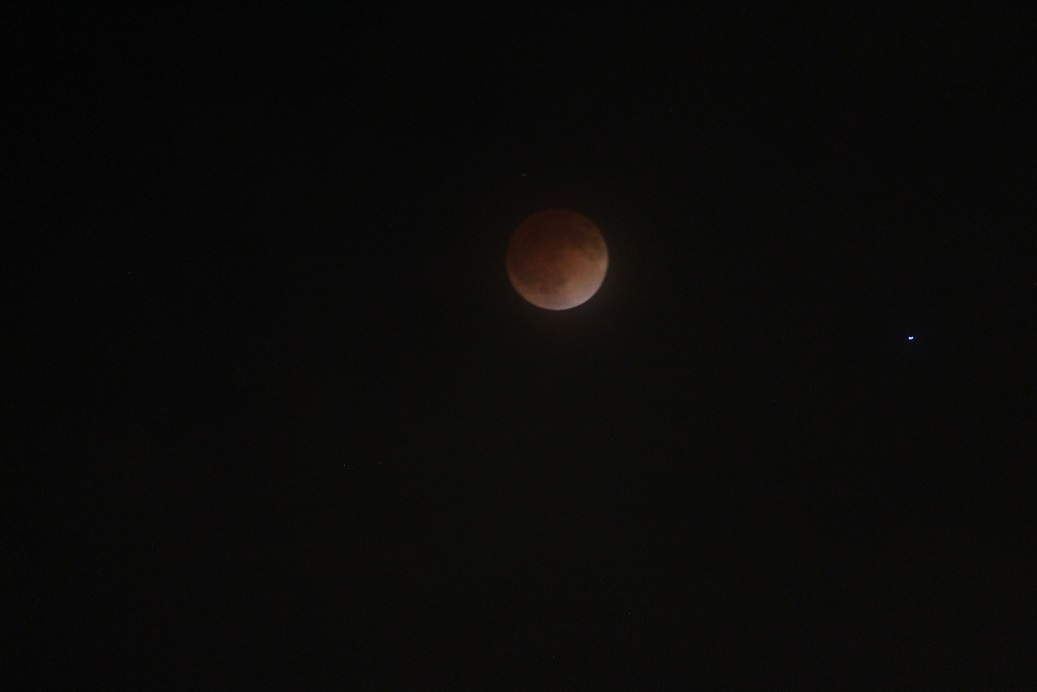
Tustin, CA, 7:40 UTC

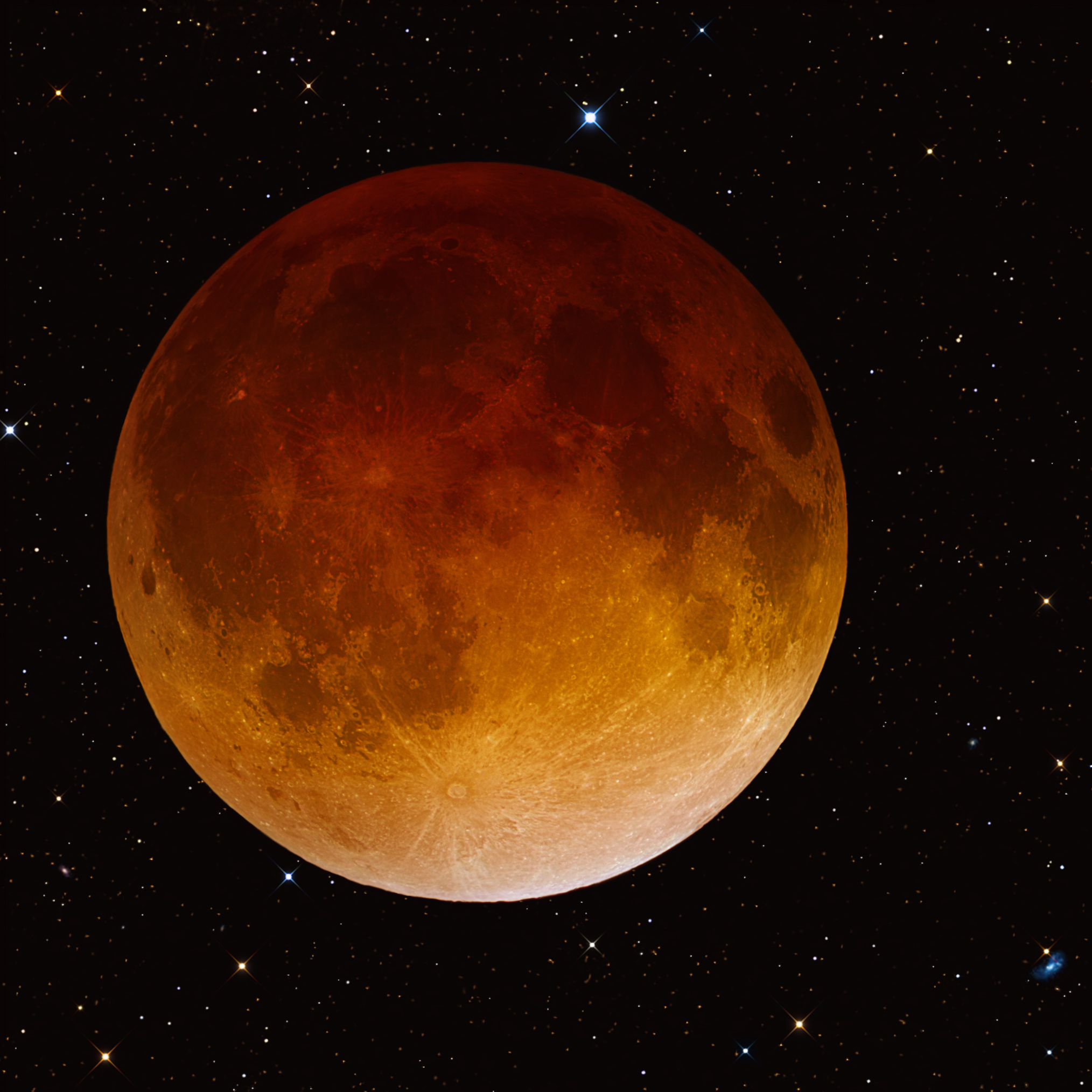
Charleston, WV, 7:44 UTC
The full eclipse by R. Jay GaBany

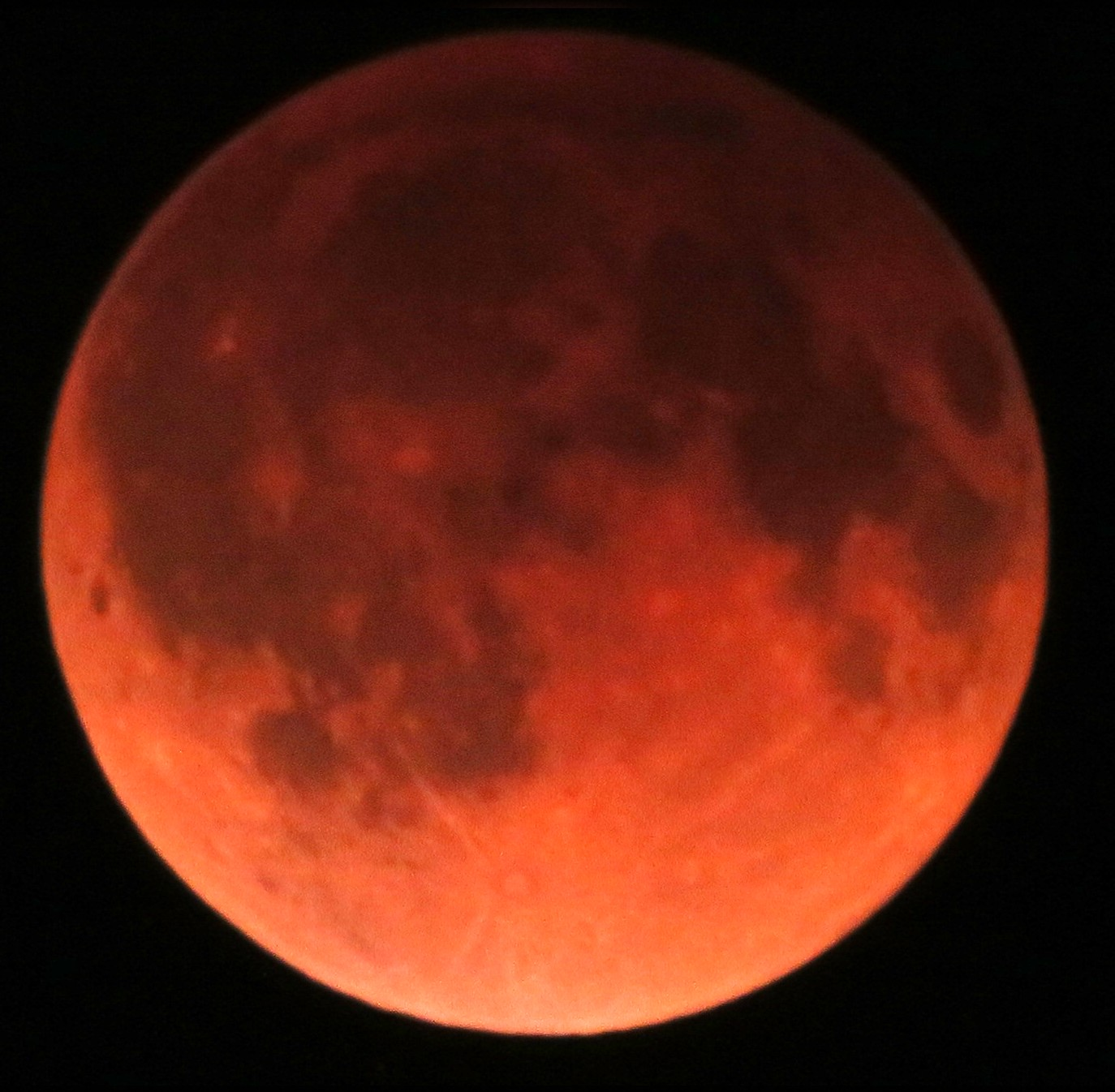
Minneapolis, MN, 7:46 UTC

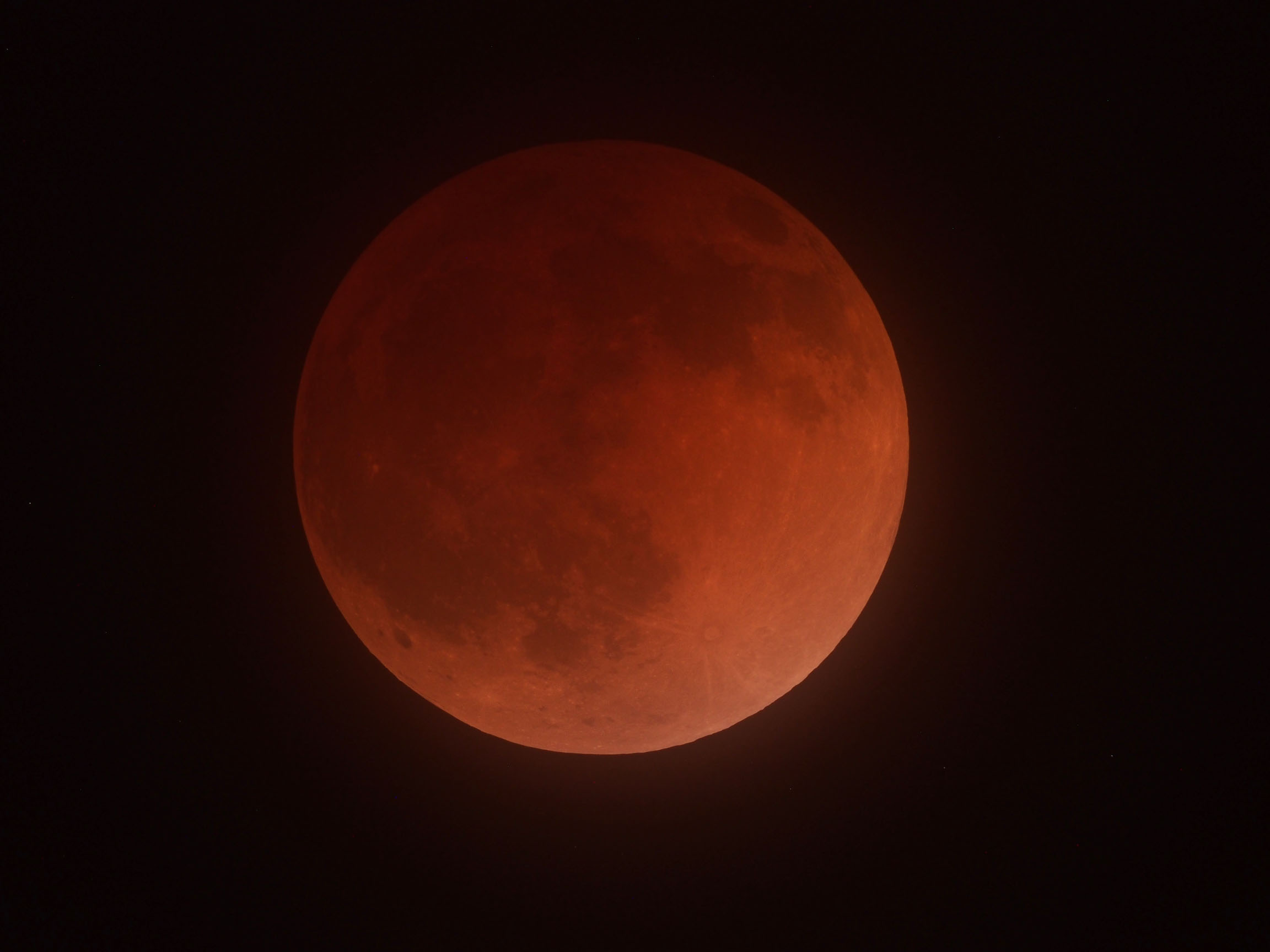
San Jose, CA, 7:46 UTC

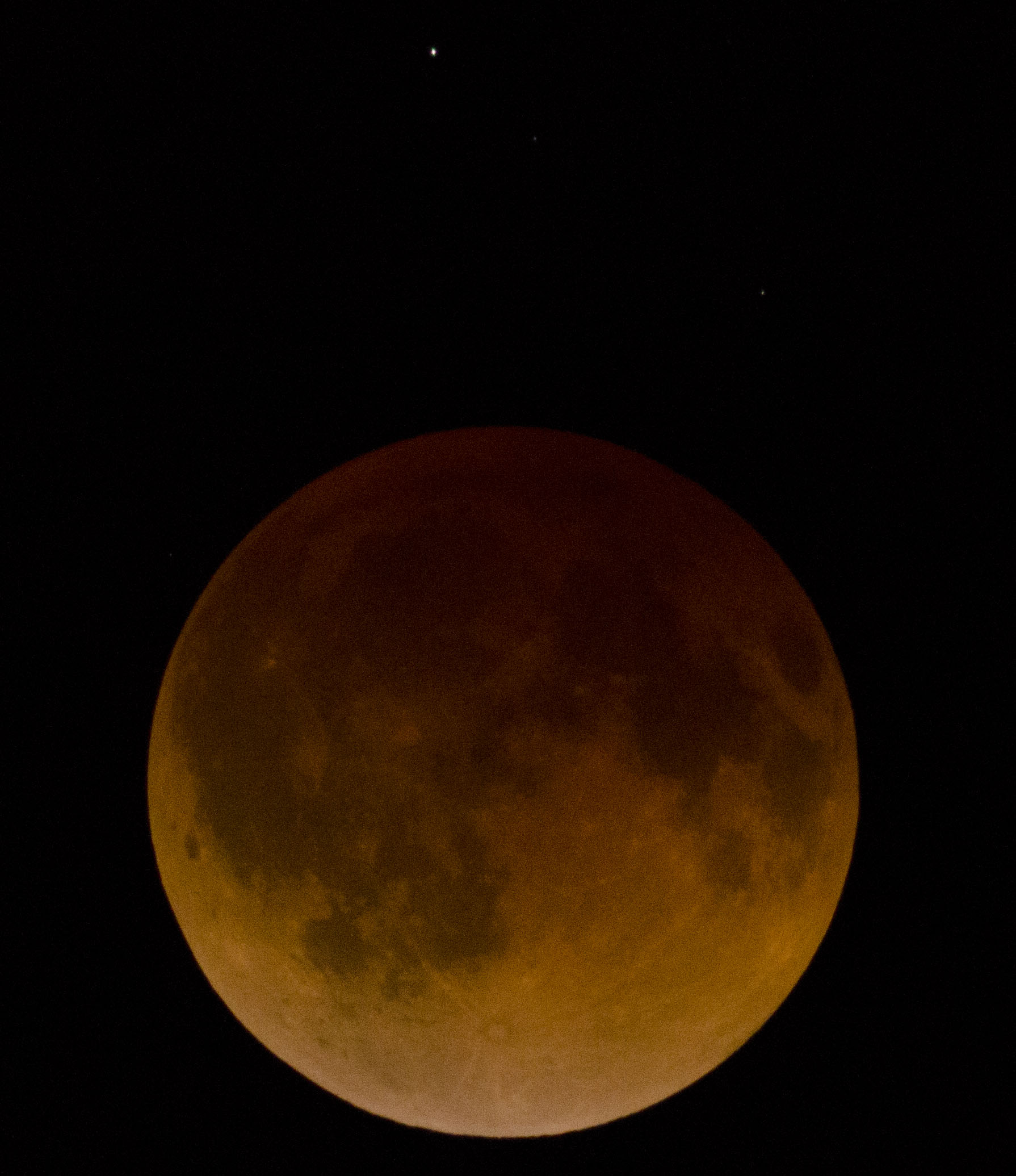
Albuquerque, NM, 7:49 UTC

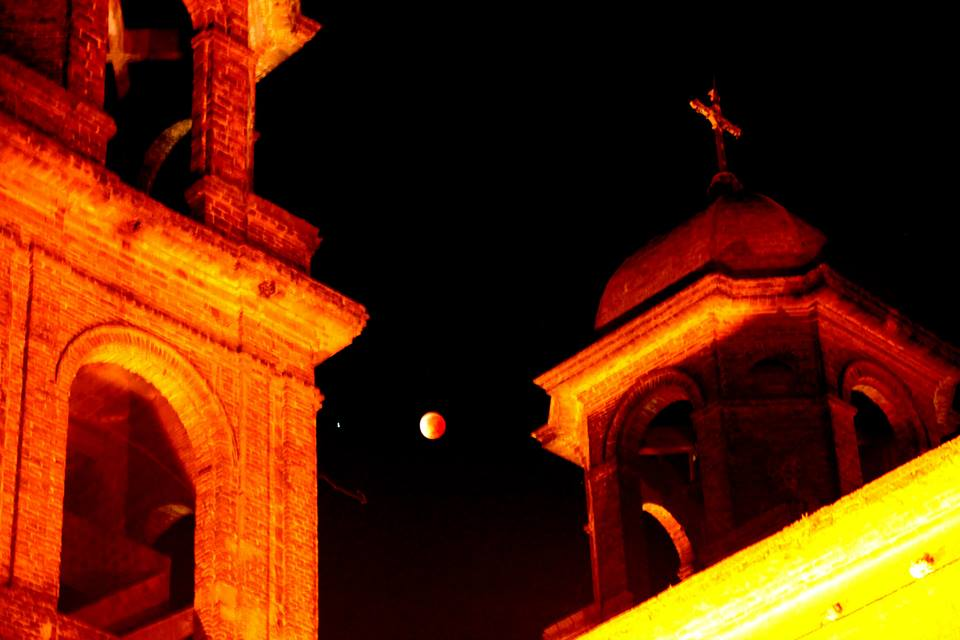
Dolores, Uruguay
between the church's tower.

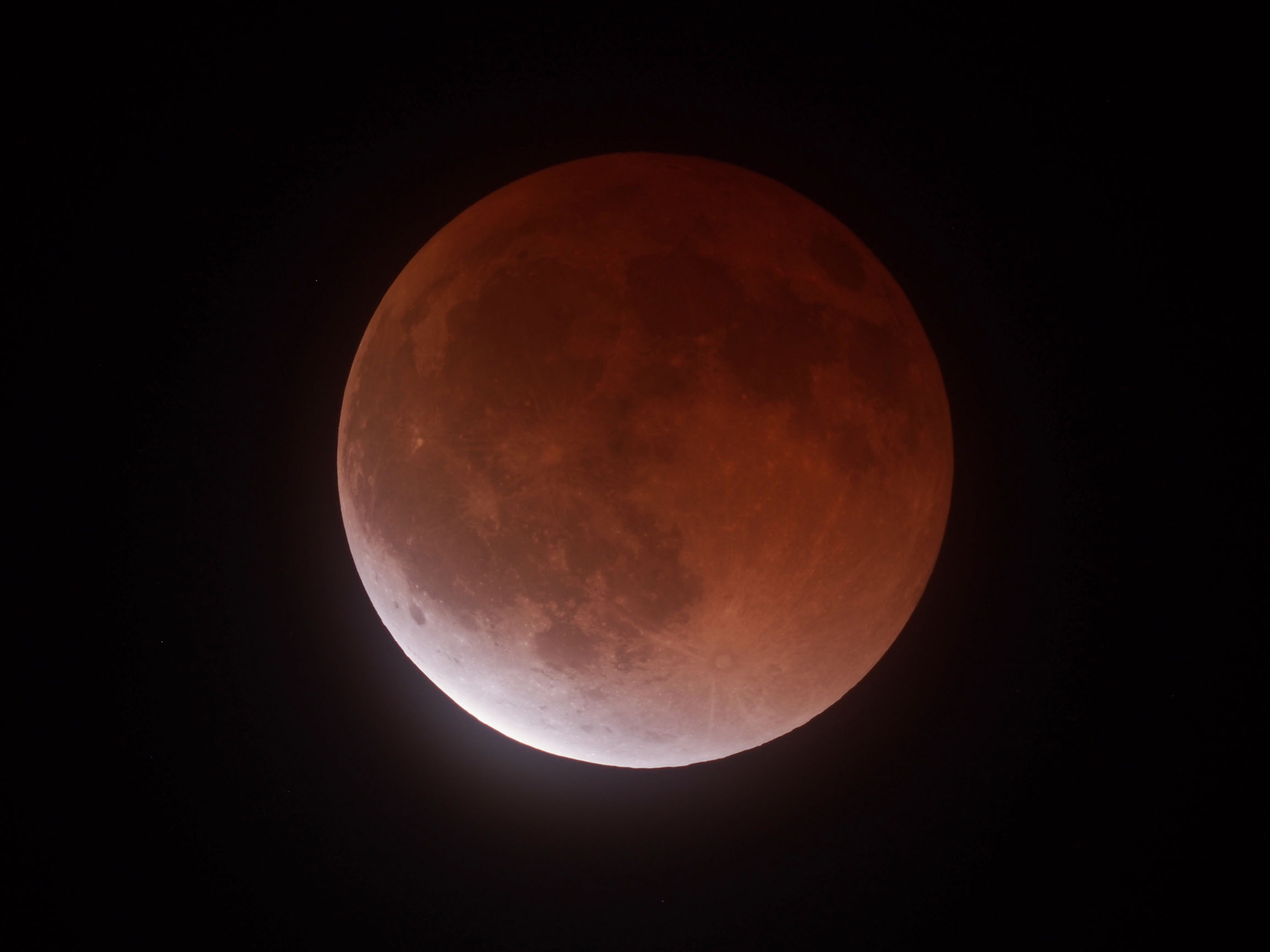
San Jose, CA, 8:23 UTC
End of totality

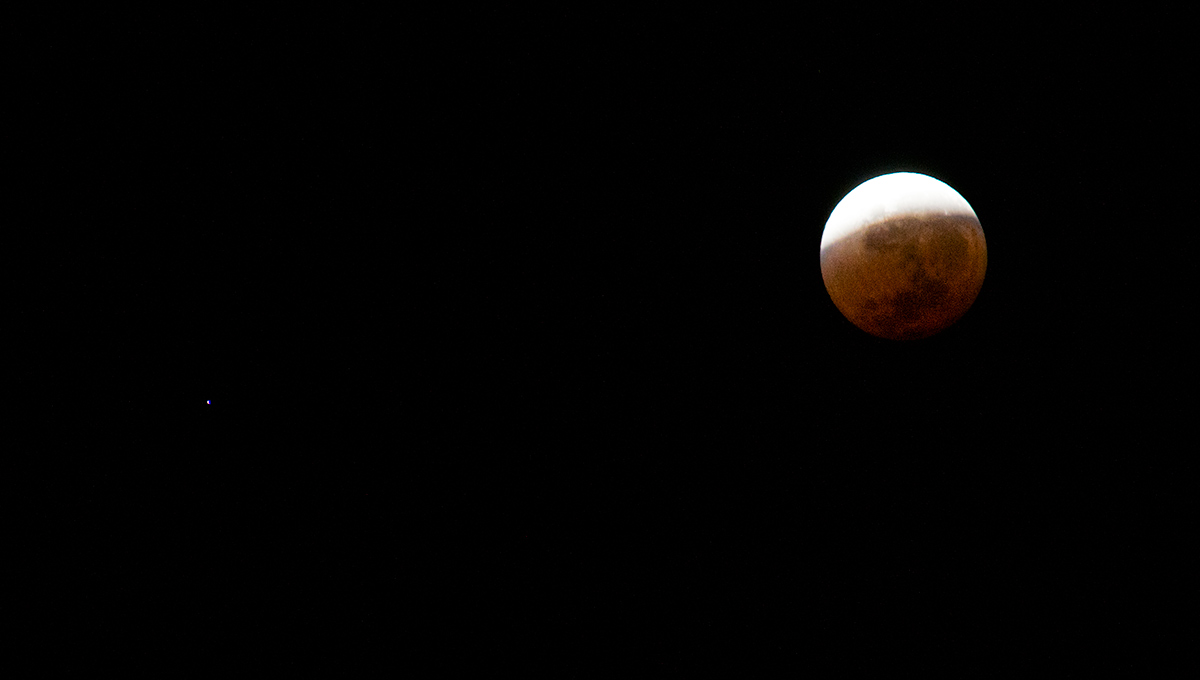
Montevideo, Uruguay, 8:43 UTC

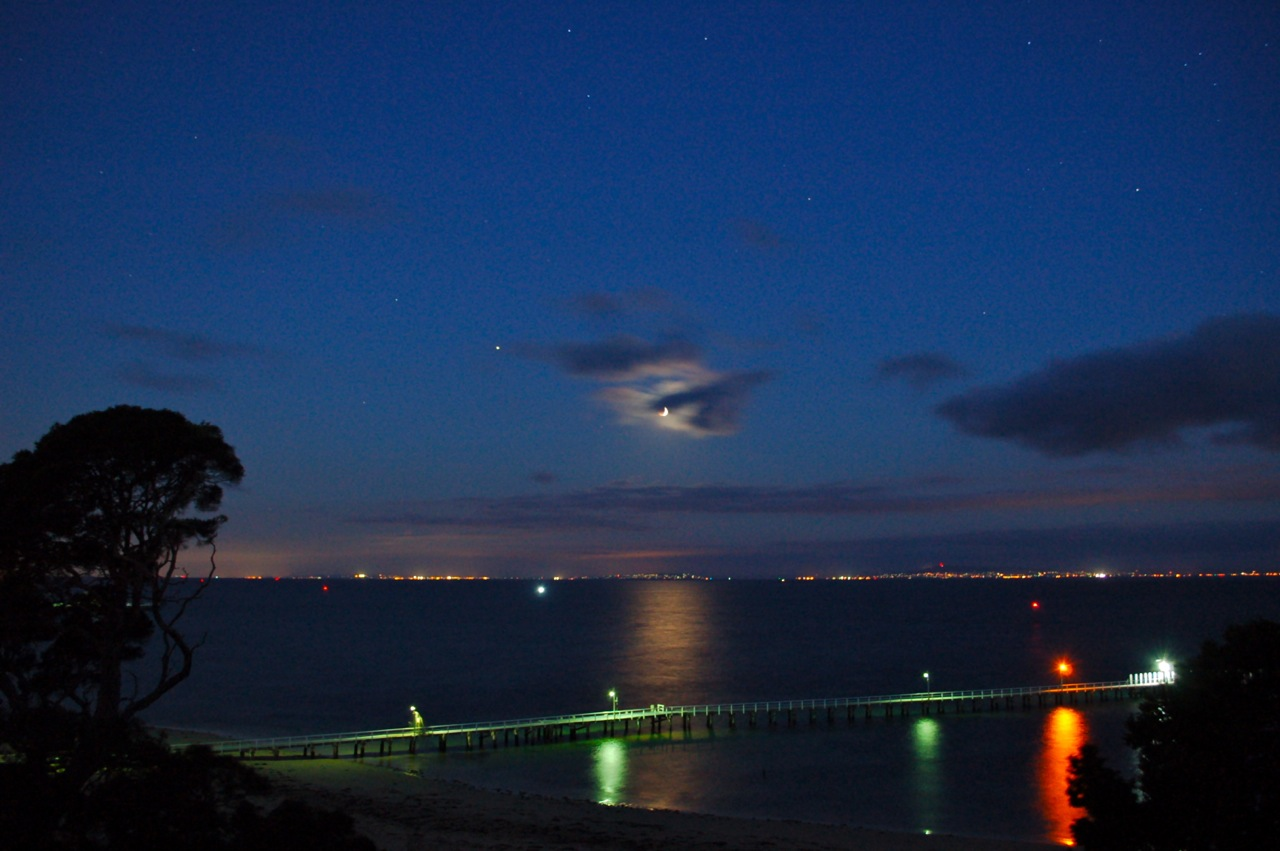
Queenscliff, Victoria, 9:14 UTC

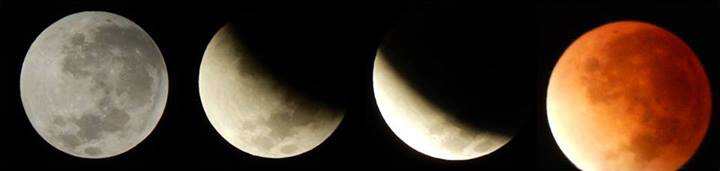
Montevideo, Uruguay

== Relation to prophecy ==
Starting in 2008, Christian pastors John Hagee and Mark Biltz began teaching "blood moon prophecies": Biltz said the Second Coming of Jesus would occur at the end of the tetrad that began with the April 2014 eclipse, while Hagee said only that the tetrad is a sign of something significant. The idea gained popular media attention in the United States, and prompted a response from the scientific radio show Earth & Sky. According to Christian Today, only a "small group of Christians" saw the eclipse as having religious significance, despite the attention.

== Eclipse details ==
Shown below is a table displaying details about this particular lunar eclipse. It describes various parameters pertaining to this eclipse.

April 15, 2014 Lunar Eclipse Parameters
Parameter	Value
Penumbral Magnitude	2.31934
Umbral Magnitude	1.29177
Gamma	−0.30174
Sun Right Ascension	01h33m40.0s
Sun Declination	+09°46'27.6"
Sun Semi-Diameter	15'56.6"
Sun Equatorial Horizontal Parallax	08.8"
Moon Right Ascension	13h33m21.1s
Moon Declination	-10°02'59.8"
Moon Semi-Diameter	15'30.9"
Moon Equatorial Horizontal Parallax	0°56'56.4"
ΔT	67.4 s

== Eclipse season ==
This eclipse is part of an eclipse season, a period, roughly every six months, when eclipses occur. Only two (or occasionally three) eclipse seasons occur each year, and each season lasts about 35 days and repeats just short of six months (173 days) later; thus two full eclipse seasons always occur each year. Either two or three eclipses happen each eclipse season. In the sequence below, each eclipse is separated by a fortnight.

Eclipse season of April 2014
April 15 Ascending node (full moon)	April 29 Descending node (new moon)
Total lunar eclipse Lunar Saros 122	Annular solar eclipse Solar Saros 148

== Related eclipses ==
=== Eclipses in 2014 ===
- A total lunar eclipse on April 15.
- A non-central annular solar eclipse on April 29.
- A total lunar eclipse on October 8.
- A partial solar eclipse on October 23.

=== Metonic ===
- Preceded by: Lunar eclipse of June 26, 2010
- Followed by: Lunar eclipse of January 31, 2018

=== Tzolkinex ===
- Preceded by: Lunar eclipse of March 3, 2007
- Followed by: Lunar eclipse of May 26, 2021

=== Half-Saros ===
- Preceded by: Solar eclipse of April 8, 2005
- Followed by: Solar eclipse of April 20, 2023

=== Tritos ===
- Preceded by: Lunar eclipse of May 16, 2003
- Followed by: Lunar eclipse of March 14, 2025

=== Lunar Saros 122 ===
- Preceded by: Lunar eclipse of April 4, 1996
- Followed by: Lunar eclipse of April 25, 2032

=== Inex ===
- Preceded by: Lunar eclipse of May 4, 1985
- Followed by: Lunar eclipse of March 25, 2043

=== Triad ===
- Preceded by: Lunar eclipse of June 15, 1927
- Followed by: Lunar eclipse of February 14, 2101

=== Lunar eclipses of 2013–2016 ===
This eclipse is a member of a semester series. An eclipse in a semester series of lunar eclipses repeats approximately every 177 days and 4 hours (a semester) at alternating nodes of the Moon's orbit.

The penumbral lunar eclipse on May 25, 2013 occurs in the previous lunar year eclipse set, and the penumbral lunar eclipse on August 18, 2016 occurs in the next lunar year eclipse set.

Lunar eclipse series sets from 2013 to 2016
Ascending node				Descending node			
Saros	Date Viewing	Type Chart	Gamma	Saros	Date Viewing	Type Chart	Gamma
112	2013 Apr 25	Partial	−1.0121	117	2013 Oct 18	Penumbral	1.1508
122	2014 Apr 15	Total	−0.3017	127	2014 Oct 08	Total	0.3827
132	2015 Apr 04	Total	0.4460	137	2015 Sep 28	Total	−0.3296
142	2016 Mar 23	Penumbral	1.1592	147	2016 Sep 16	Penumbral	−1.0549

=== Saros 122 ===
This eclipse is a part of Saros series 122, repeating every 18 years, 11 days, and containing 74 events. The series started with a penumbral lunar eclipse on August 14, 1022. It contains partial eclipses from April 10, 1419 through June 24, 1545; total eclipses from July 5, 1563 through May 6, 2050; and a second set of partial eclipses from May 17, 2068 through July 21, 2176. The series ends at member 74 as a penumbral eclipse on October 29, 2338.

The longest duration of totality was produced by member 39 at 100 minutes, 5 seconds on October 11, 1707. All eclipses in this series occur at the Moon’s ascending node of orbit.

Greatest	First			
The greatest eclipse of the series occurred on 1707 Oct 11, lasting 100 minutes, 5 seconds.	Penumbral	Partial	Total	Central
The greatest eclipse of the series occurred on 1707 Oct 11, lasting 100 minutes, 5 seconds.	1022 Aug 14	1419 Apr 10	1563 Jul 05	1617 Aug 16
The greatest eclipse of the series occurred on 1707 Oct 11, lasting 100 minutes, 5 seconds.	Last			
The greatest eclipse of the series occurred on 1707 Oct 11, lasting 100 minutes, 5 seconds.	Central	Total	Partial	Penumbral
The greatest eclipse of the series occurred on 1707 Oct 11, lasting 100 minutes, 5 seconds.	1996 Apr 04	2050 May 06	2176 Jul 21	2338 Oct 29

Eclipses are tabulated in three columns; every third eclipse in the same column is one exeligmos apart, so they all cast shadows over approximately the same parts of the Earth.

Series members 45–66 occur between 1801 and 2200:
45	46	47
1815 Dec 16	1833 Dec 26	1852 Jan 07
48	49	50
1870 Jan 17	1888 Jan 28	1906 Feb 09
51	52	53
1924 Feb 20	1942 Mar 03	1960 Mar 13
54	55	56
1978 Mar 24	1996 Apr 04	2014 Apr 15
57	58	59
2032 Apr 25	2050 May 06	2068 May 17
60	61	62
2086 May 28	2104 Jun 08	2122 Jun 20
63	64	65
2140 Jun 30	2158 Jul 11	2176 Jul 21
66
2194 Aug 02

=== Tritos series ===
This eclipse is a part of a tritos cycle, repeating at alternating nodes every 135 synodic months (≈ 3986.63 days, or 11 years minus 1 month). Their appearance and longitude are irregular due to a lack of synchronization with the anomalistic month (period of perigee), but groupings of 3 tritos cycles (≈ 33 years minus 3 months) come close (≈ 434.044 anomalistic months), so eclipses are similar in these groupings.

Series members between 1801 and 2200
1806 Nov 26 (Saros 103)		1828 Sep 23 (Saros 105)	1839 Aug 24 (Saros 106)	1850 Jul 24 (Saros 107)
1861 Jun 22 (Saros 108)	1872 May 22 (Saros 109)	1883 Apr 22 (Saros 110)	1894 Mar 21 (Saros 111)	1905 Feb 19 (Saros 112)
1916 Jan 20 (Saros 113)	1926 Dec 19 (Saros 114)	1937 Nov 18 (Saros 115)	1948 Oct 18 (Saros 116)	1959 Sep 17 (Saros 117)
1970 Aug 17 (Saros 118)	1981 Jul 17 (Saros 119)	1992 Jun 15 (Saros 120)	2003 May 16 (Saros 121)	2014 Apr 15 (Saros 122)
2025 Mar 14 (Saros 123)	2036 Feb 11 (Saros 124)	2047 Jan 12 (Saros 125)	2057 Dec 11 (Saros 126)	2068 Nov 09 (Saros 127)
2079 Oct 10 (Saros 128)	2090 Sep 08 (Saros 129)	2101 Aug 09 (Saros 130)	2112 Jul 09 (Saros 131)	2123 Jun 09 (Saros 132)
2134 May 08 (Saros 133)	2145 Apr 07 (Saros 134)	2156 Mar 07 (Saros 135)	2167 Feb 04 (Saros 136)	2178 Jan 04 (Saros 137)
2188 Dec 04 (Saros 138)	2199 Nov 02 (Saros 139)			

=== Inex series ===
This eclipse is a part of the long period inex cycle, repeating at alternating nodes, every 358 synodic months (≈ 10,571.95 days, or 29 years minus 20 days). Their appearance and longitude are irregular due to a lack of synchronization with the anomalistic month (period of perigee). However, groupings of 3 inex cycles (≈ 87 years minus 2 months) comes close (≈ 1,151.02 anomalistic months), so eclipses are similar in these groupings.

Series members between 1801 and 2200
1811 Sep 02 (Saros 115)	1840 Aug 13 (Saros 116)	1869 Jul 23 (Saros 117)
1898 Jul 03 (Saros 118)	1927 Jun 15 (Saros 119)	1956 May 24 (Saros 120)
1985 May 04 (Saros 121)	2014 Apr 15 (Saros 122)	2043 Mar 25 (Saros 123)
2072 Mar 04 (Saros 124)	2101 Feb 14 (Saros 125)	2130 Jan 24 (Saros 126)
2159 Jan 04 (Saros 127)	2187 Dec 15 (Saros 128)	

=== Half-Saros cycle ===
A lunar eclipse will be preceded and followed by solar eclipses by 9 years and 5.5 days (a half saros). This lunar eclipse is related to two hybrid total/annualar solar eclipses of solar saros 129.

April 8, 2005	April 20, 2023

== See also ==
- List of 21st-century lunar eclipses
- List of lunar eclipses
