= May 1956 lunar eclipse =

Partial lunar eclipse May 24, 1956

- Partial eclipse
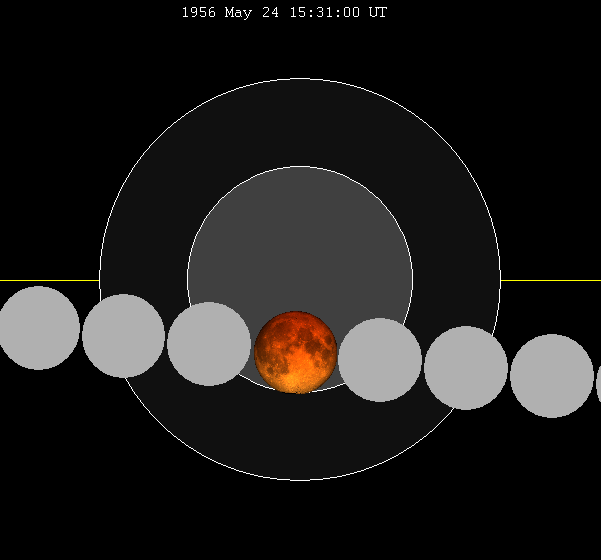
- The Moon's hourly motion shown right to left
- Date: May 24, 1956
- Gamma: −0.4726
- Magnitude: 0.9647
- Saros cycle: 120 (55 of 84)
- Partiality: 204 minutes, 27 seconds
- Penumbral: 348 minutes, 32 seconds
Contacts (UTC)
- P1: 12:37:06
- U1: 13:49:05
- Greatest: 15:31:20
- U4: 17:13:32
- P4: 18:25:38

A partial lunar eclipse occurred at the Moon’s ascending node of orbit on Thursday, May 24, 1956, with an umbral magnitude of 0.9647. A lunar eclipse occurs when the Moon moves into the Earth's shadow, causing the Moon to be darkened. A partial lunar eclipse occurs when one part of the Moon is in the Earth's umbra, while the other part is in the Earth's penumbra. Unlike a solar eclipse, which can only be viewed from a relatively small area of the world, a lunar eclipse may be viewed from anywhere on the night side of Earth. Occurring about 4.3 days before apogee (on May 28, 1956, at 22:10 UTC), the Moon's apparent diameter was smaller.

This lunar eclipse was the first of an almost tetrad, with the others being on November 18, 1956 (total); May 13, 1957 (total); and November 7, 1957 (total).

This was the first eclipse of the last partial set in Lunar Saros 120.

== Visibility ==
The eclipse was completely visible over east Asia, Australia, and Antarctica, seen rising over central and east Africa, eastern Europe, and the western half of Asia and setting over the eastern Pacific Ocean.

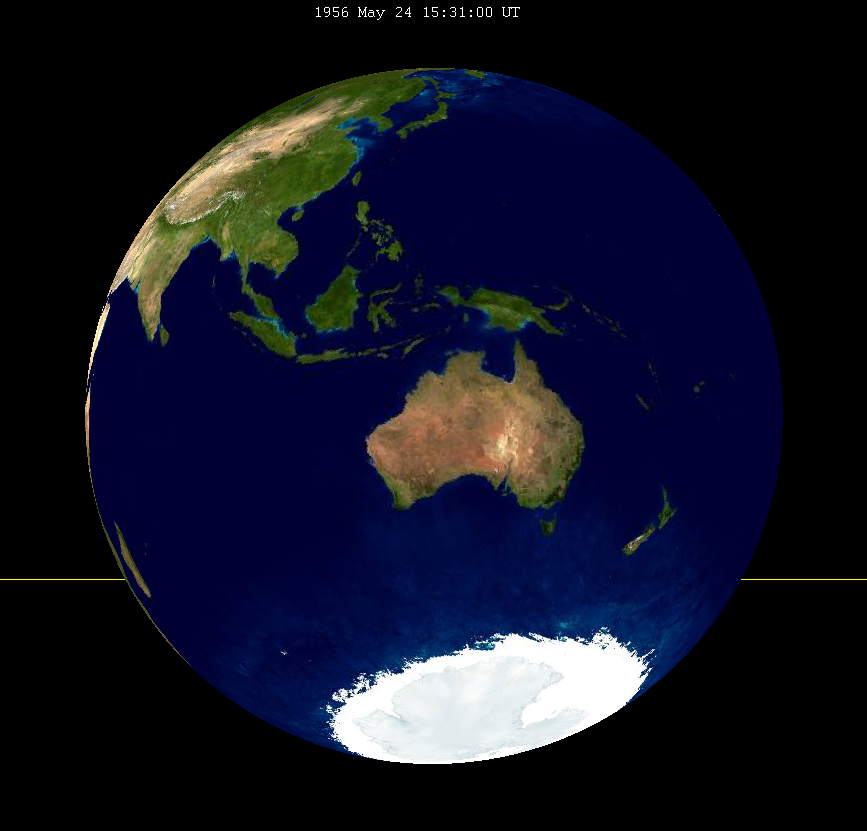
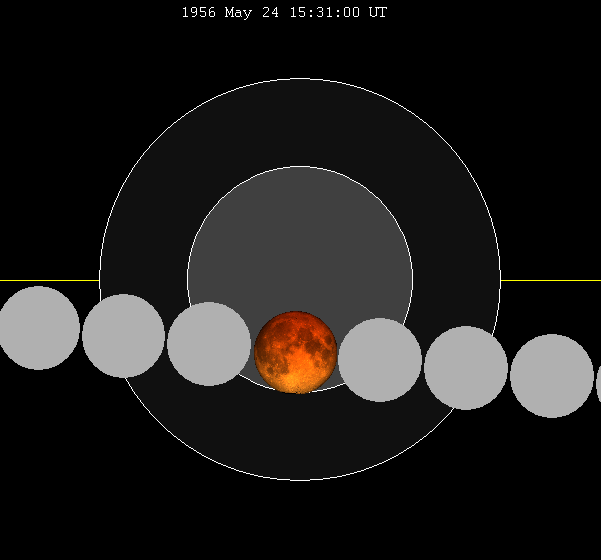

== Eclipse details ==
Shown below is a table displaying details about this particular solar eclipse. It describes various parameters pertaining to this eclipse.

May 24, 1956 Lunar Eclipse Parameters
Parameter	Value
Penumbral Magnitude	2.01740
Umbral Magnitude	0.96473
Gamma	−0.47260
Sun Right Ascension	04h05m33.5s
Sun Declination	+20°50'30.4"
Sun Semi-Diameter	15'47.4"
Sun Equatorial Horizontal Parallax	08.7"
Moon Right Ascension	16h05m23.2s
Moon Declination	-21°16'24.6"
Moon Semi-Diameter	15'00.0"
Moon Equatorial Horizontal Parallax	0°55'03.0"
ΔT	31.6 s

== Eclipse season ==
This eclipse is part of an eclipse season, a period, roughly every six months, when eclipses occur. Only two (or occasionally three) eclipse seasons occur each year, and each season lasts about 35 days and repeats just short of six months (173 days) later; thus two full eclipse seasons always occur each year. Either two or three eclipses happen each eclipse season. In the sequence below, each eclipse is separated by a fortnight.

Eclipse season of May–June 1956
May 24 Ascending node (full moon)	June 8 Descending node (new moon)
Partial lunar eclipse Lunar Saros 120	Total solar eclipse Solar Saros 146

== Related eclipses ==
=== Eclipses in 1956 ===
- A partial lunar eclipse on May 24.
- A total solar eclipse on June 8.
- A total lunar eclipse on November 18.
- A partial solar eclipse on December 2.

=== Metonic ===
- Preceded by: Lunar eclipse of August 5, 1952
- Followed by: Lunar eclipse of March 13, 1960

=== Tzolkinex ===
- Preceded by: Lunar eclipse of April 13, 1949
- Followed by: Lunar eclipse of July 6, 1963

=== Half-Saros ===
- Preceded by: Solar eclipse of May 20, 1947
- Followed by: Solar eclipse of May 30, 1965

=== Tritos ===
- Preceded by: Lunar eclipse of June 25, 1945
- Followed by: Lunar eclipse of April 24, 1967

=== Lunar Saros 120 ===
- Preceded by: Lunar eclipse of May 14, 1938
- Followed by: Lunar eclipse of June 4, 1974

=== Inex ===
- Preceded by: Lunar eclipse of June 15, 1927
- Followed by: Lunar eclipse of May 4, 1985

=== Triad ===
- Preceded by: Lunar eclipse of July 23, 1869
- Followed by: Lunar eclipse of March 25, 2043

=== Lunar eclipses of 1955–1958 ===
This eclipse is a member of a semester series. An eclipse in a semester series of lunar eclipses repeats approximately every 177 days and 4 hours (a semester) at alternating nodes of the Moon's orbit.

The penumbral lunar eclipse on January 8, 1955 occurs in the previous lunar year eclipse set, and the penumbral lunar eclipse on April 4, 1958 occurs in the next lunar year eclipse set.

Lunar eclipse series sets from 1955 to 1958
Ascending node				Descending node			
Saros	Date Viewing	Type Chart	Gamma	Saros	Date Viewing	Type Chart	Gamma
110	1955 Jun 05	Penumbral	−1.2384	115	1955 Nov 29	Partial	0.9551
120	1956 May 24	Partial	−0.4726	125	1956 Nov 18	Total	0.2917
130	1957 May 13	Total	0.3046	135	1957 Nov 07	Total	−0.4332
140	1958 May 03	Partial	1.0188	145	1958 Oct 27	Penumbral	−1.1571

=== Saros 120 ===
This eclipse is a part of Saros series 120, repeating every 18 years, 11 days, and containing 83 events. The series started with a penumbral lunar eclipse on October 16, 1000. It contains partial eclipses from May 31, 1379 through August 4, 1487; total eclipses from August 14, 1505 through May 14, 1938; and a second set of partial eclipses from May 24, 1956 through July 28, 2064. The series ends at member 83 as a penumbral eclipse on April 7, 2479.

The longest duration of totality was produced by member 43 at 104 minutes, 55 seconds on January 24, 1758. All eclipses in this series occur at the Moon’s ascending node of orbit.

Greatest	First			
The greatest eclipse of the series occurred on 1758 Jan 24, lasting 104 minutes, 55 seconds.	Penumbral	Partial	Total	Central
The greatest eclipse of the series occurred on 1758 Jan 24, lasting 104 minutes, 55 seconds.	1000 Oct 16	1379 May 31	1505 Aug 14	1559 Sep 16
The greatest eclipse of the series occurred on 1758 Jan 24, lasting 104 minutes, 55 seconds.	Last			
The greatest eclipse of the series occurred on 1758 Jan 24, lasting 104 minutes, 55 seconds.	Central	Total	Partial	Penumbral
The greatest eclipse of the series occurred on 1758 Jan 24, lasting 104 minutes, 55 seconds.	1902 Apr 22	1938 May 14	2064 Jul 28	2479 Apr 07

Eclipses are tabulated in three columns; every third eclipse in the same column is one exeligmos apart, so they all cast shadows over approximately the same parts of the Earth.

Series members 46–67 occur between 1801 and 2200:
46	47	48
1812 Feb 27	1830 Mar 09	1848 Mar 19
49	50	51
1866 Mar 31	1884 Apr 10	1902 Apr 22
52	53	54
1920 May 03	1938 May 14	1956 May 24
55	56	57
1974 Jun 04	1992 Jun 15	2010 Jun 26
58	59	60
2028 Jul 06	2046 Jul 18	2064 Jul 28
61	62	63
2082 Aug 08	2100 Aug 19	2118 Aug 31
64	65	66
2136 Sep 10	2154 Sep 21	2172 Oct 02
67
2190 Oct 13

=== Tritos series ===
This eclipse is a part of a tritos cycle, repeating at alternating nodes every 135 synodic months (≈ 3986.63 days, or 11 years minus 1 month). Their appearance and longitude are irregular due to a lack of synchronization with the anomalistic month (period of perigee), but groupings of 3 tritos cycles (≈ 33 years minus 3 months) come close (≈ 434.044 anomalistic months), so eclipses are similar in these groupings.

Series members between 1801 and 2200
1803 Aug 03 (Saros 106)	1814 Jul 02 (Saros 107)	1825 Jun 01 (Saros 108)	1836 May 01 (Saros 109)	1847 Mar 31 (Saros 110)
1858 Feb 27 (Saros 111)	1869 Jan 28 (Saros 112)	1879 Dec 28 (Saros 113)	1890 Nov 26 (Saros 114)	1901 Oct 27 (Saros 115)
1912 Sep 26 (Saros 116)	1923 Aug 26 (Saros 117)	1934 Jul 26 (Saros 118)	1945 Jun 25 (Saros 119)	1956 May 24 (Saros 120)
1967 Apr 24 (Saros 121)	1978 Mar 24 (Saros 122)	1989 Feb 20 (Saros 123)	2000 Jan 21 (Saros 124)	2010 Dec 21 (Saros 125)
2021 Nov 19 (Saros 126)	2032 Oct 18 (Saros 127)	2043 Sep 19 (Saros 128)	2054 Aug 18 (Saros 129)	2065 Jul 17 (Saros 130)
2076 Jun 17 (Saros 131)	2087 May 17 (Saros 132)	2098 Apr 15 (Saros 133)	2109 Mar 17 (Saros 134)	2120 Feb 14 (Saros 135)
2131 Jan 13 (Saros 136)	2141 Dec 13 (Saros 137)	2152 Nov 12 (Saros 138)	2163 Oct 12 (Saros 139)	2174 Sep 11 (Saros 140)
2185 Aug 11 (Saros 141)	2196 Jul 10 (Saros 142)			

=== Inex series ===
This eclipse is a part of the long period inex cycle, repeating at alternating nodes, every 358 synodic months (≈ 10,571.95 days, or 29 years minus 20 days). Their appearance and longitude are irregular due to a lack of synchronization with the anomalistic month (period of perigee). However, groupings of 3 inex cycles (≈ 87 years minus 2 months) comes close (≈ 1,151.02 anomalistic months), so eclipses are similar in these groupings.

Series members between 1801 and 2200
1811 Sep 02 (Saros 115)	1840 Aug 13 (Saros 116)	1869 Jul 23 (Saros 117)
1898 Jul 03 (Saros 118)	1927 Jun 15 (Saros 119)	1956 May 24 (Saros 120)
1985 May 04 (Saros 121)	2014 Apr 15 (Saros 122)	2043 Mar 25 (Saros 123)
2072 Mar 04 (Saros 124)	2101 Feb 14 (Saros 125)	2130 Jan 24 (Saros 126)
2159 Jan 04 (Saros 127)	2187 Dec 15 (Saros 128)	

=== Half-Saros cycle ===
A lunar eclipse will be preceded and followed by solar eclipses by 9 years and 5.5 days (a half saros). This lunar eclipse is related to two total solar eclipses of Solar Saros 127.

May 20, 1947	May 30, 1965

== See also ==
- List of lunar eclipses
- List of 20th-century lunar eclipses
