= Chambliss Amateur Achievement Award =

Research prize of the American Astronomical Society

The Chambliss Amateur Achievement Award is awarded by the American Astronomical Society for an achievement in astronomical research made by an amateur astronomer resident in North America. The prize is named after Carlson R. Chambliss of Kutztown University of Pennsylvania, who donated the funds to support the prize. The award will consist of a 224-gram (½-lb) silver medal and $1,000 cash.

== Previous winners ==
- 2006 Brian D. Warner
- 2007 Ronald H. Bissinger
- 2008 Steve Mandel
- 2009 Robert D. Stephens
- 2010 R. Jay GaBany
- 2011 Tim Puckett
- 2012 Kian Jek
- 2013 No award
- 2014 Mike Simonsen
- 2015 No award
- 2016 Daryll LaCourse
- 2017 No award
- 2018 Donald G. Bruns
- 2019 No award
- 2020 Dennis Conti
- 2021 No award
- 2022 No award
- 2023 No award
- 2024 Dan Caselden
- 2025 Richard Donnerstein

== See also ==
- Amateur Achievement Award of the Astronomical Society of the Pacific
- List of astronomy awards
- List of awards named after people
