= Brian D. Warner =

American astronomer (b. 1952)

- Born: Brian Dale Warner; 1952 (age 73–74)
- Education: University of Colorado Colorado Springs; James Cook University (M.Sc.)
- Occupations: Amateur astronomer; Computer programmer
- Awards: Chambliss Amateur Achievement Award (2006)

Brian Dale Warner (born 1952) is an American amateur astronomer and computer programmer. In 2006 he was awarded the inaugural Chambliss Amateur Achievement Award by the American Astronomical Society.

From the 1990s to 2011 Warner operated from the Palmer Divide Observatory at his home near Colorado Springs, Colorado. Since 2011 he has operated from the Palmer Divide Station (U82) at the Center for Solar System Studies in Landers, California.

Warner's astronomy has included extensive use of photometry to record the light curves of asteroids and variable stars. His identification of five pairs of binary asteroids in the main belt contributed to the abandonment of the theory that binary asteroids only form through tidal interactions with planets. He discovered the asteroids 70030 Margaretmiller, 34366 Rosavestal and 34398 Terryschmidt.

Warner is the software developer of the Minor Planet Observer (MPO) suite of astronomy software used for photometry observations of asteroids and variable stars. He also authored the 2006 book A Practical Guide to Lightcurve Photometry and Analysis, published by Springer, on using photometry to study asteroids and variable stars.

Warner studied undergraduate physics at the University of Colorado Colorado Springs. In 2005 he was awarded a master's degree in astronomy from James Cook University in Queensland, Australia.

The 4.9 km (3.0 mi) wide main belt asteroid 8734 Warner is named in his honor.

== Books ==
- Warner, Brian D. (2006). A Practical Guide to Lightcurve Photometry and Analysis. New York: Springer. ISBN 978-0-387-33391-5. OCLC 209915880.
