= June 2010 lunar eclipse =

Partial lunar eclipse of 26 June 2010

- Partial eclipse
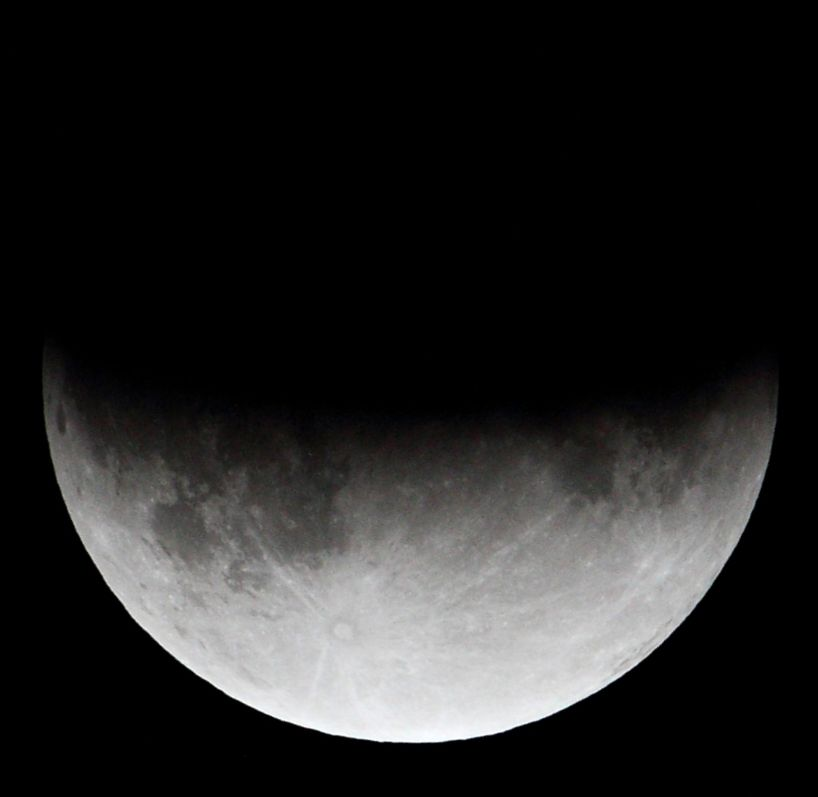
- Partiality as viewed from Canberra, Australia, 11:31 UTC
- Date: 26 June 2010
- Gamma: −0.7091
- Magnitude: 0.5383
- Saros cycle: 120 (58 of 84)
- Partiality: 162 minutes, 52 seconds
- Penumbral: 322 minutes, 7 seconds
Contacts (UTC)
- P1: 8:57:24
- U1: 10:16:58
- Greatest: 11:38:27
- U4: 12:59:50
- P4: 14:19:31

A partial lunar eclipse occurred at the Moon's ascending node of orbit on Saturday, 26 June 2010, with an umbral magnitude of 0.5383. A lunar eclipse occurs when the Moon moves into the Earth's shadow, causing the Moon to be darkened. A partial lunar eclipse occurs when one part of the Moon is in the Earth's umbra, while the other part is in the Earth's penumbra. Unlike a solar eclipse, which can only be viewed from a relatively small area of the world, a lunar eclipse may be viewed from anywhere on the night side of Earth. Occurring about 4.7 days before apogee (on 1 July 2010, at 6:10 UTC), the Moon's apparent diameter was smaller.

== Visibility ==
The eclipse was completely visible over much of Australia and the Pacific Ocean, seen rising over Asia and setting over North and South America.

Hourly motion shown right to left	The Moon's hourly motion across the Earth's shadow in the constellation of Sagittarius.
Visibility map

== Images ==
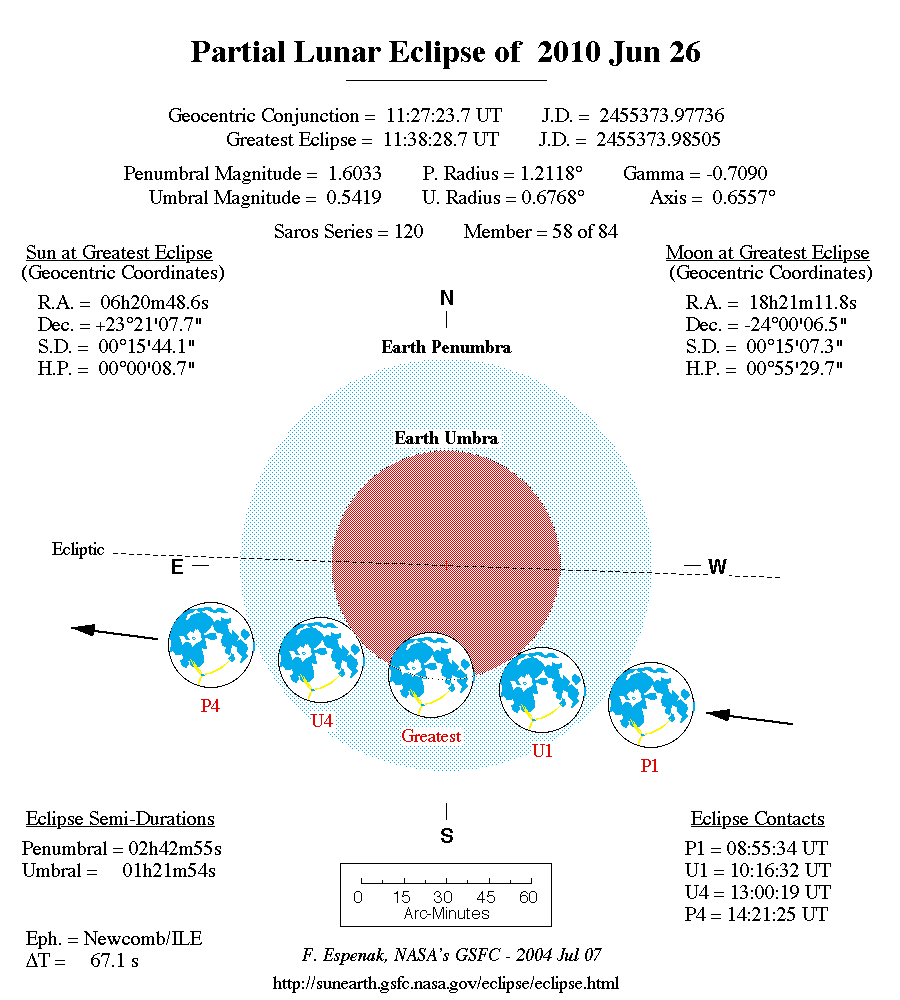
NASA chart of the eclipse

== Gallery ==
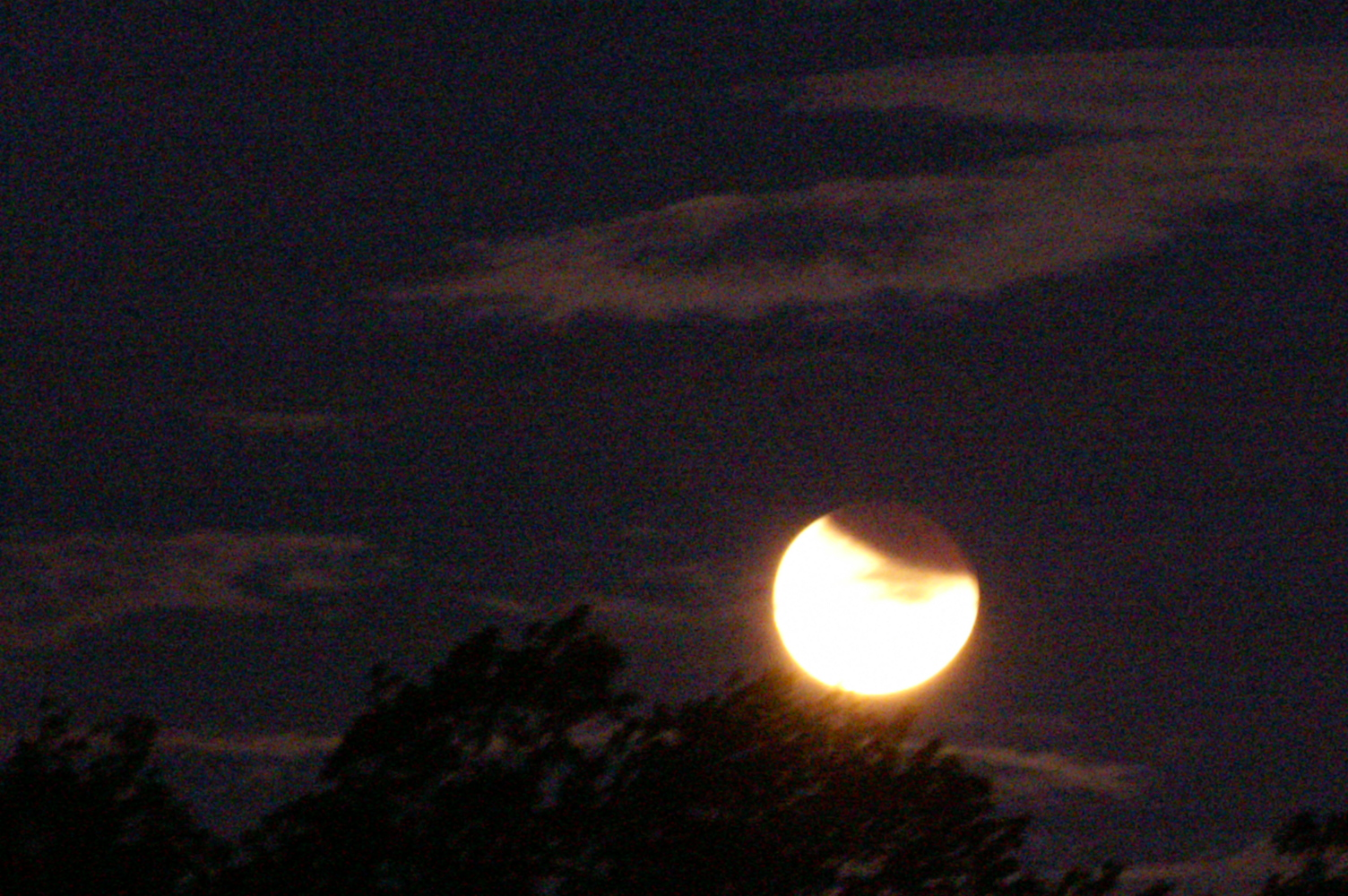
Dallas, Texas, 10:28 UTC

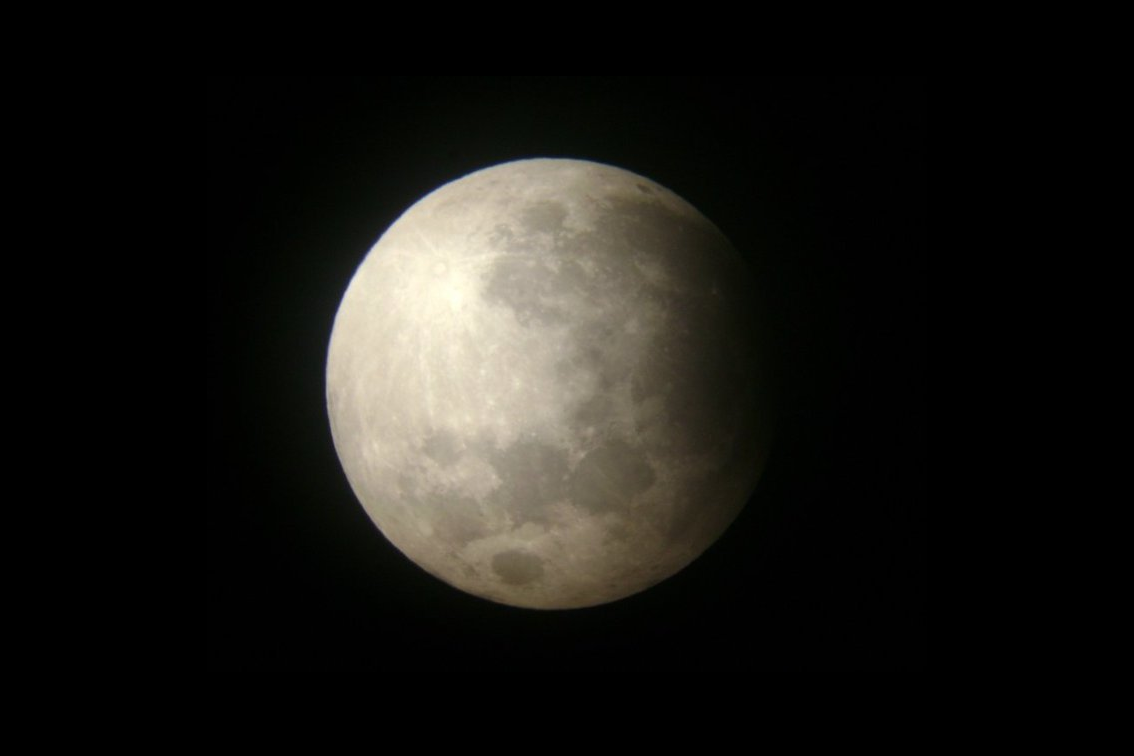
Villa Gesell, Argentina, 10:29 UTC

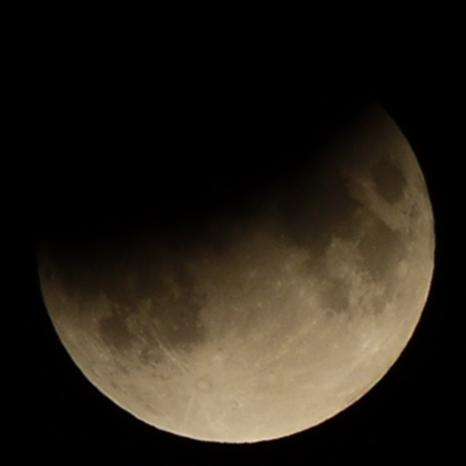
Albuquerque, New Mexico, 10:54 UTC

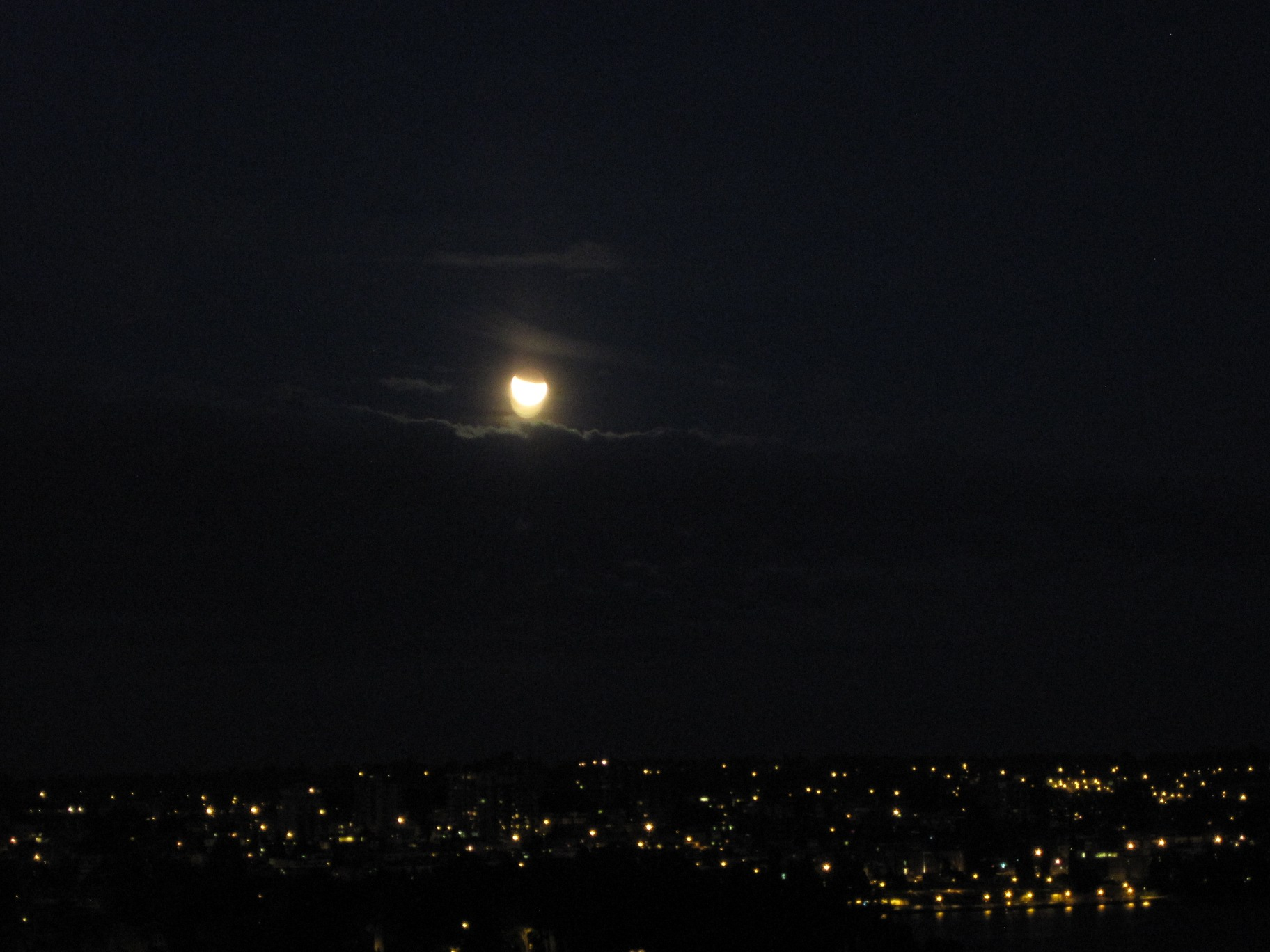
Vancouver, Canada, 11:07 UTC

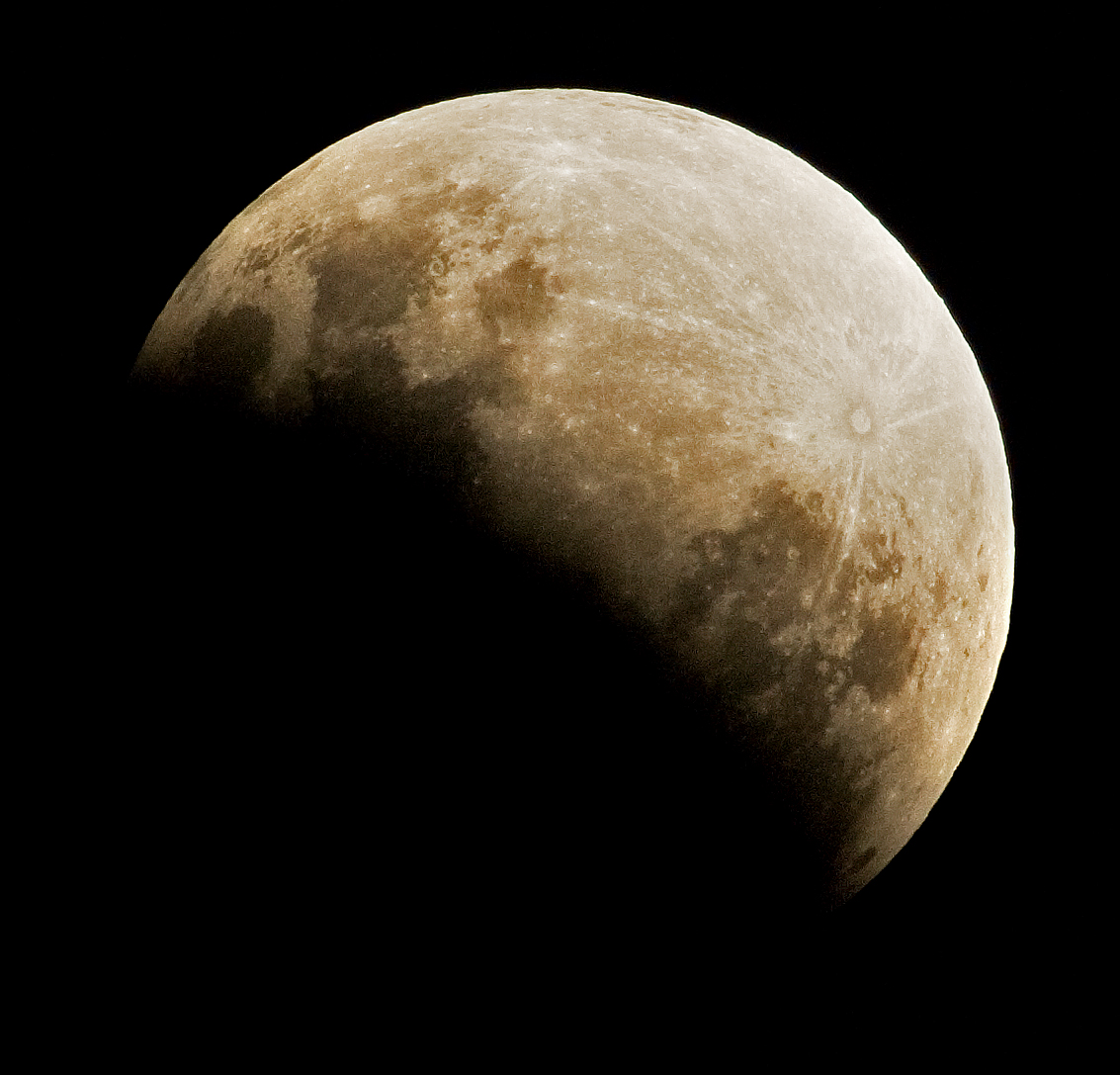
Hobart, Australia, 11:09 UTC

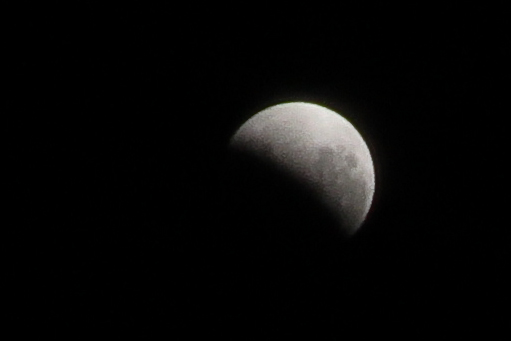
Auckland, New Zealand, 11:17 UTC

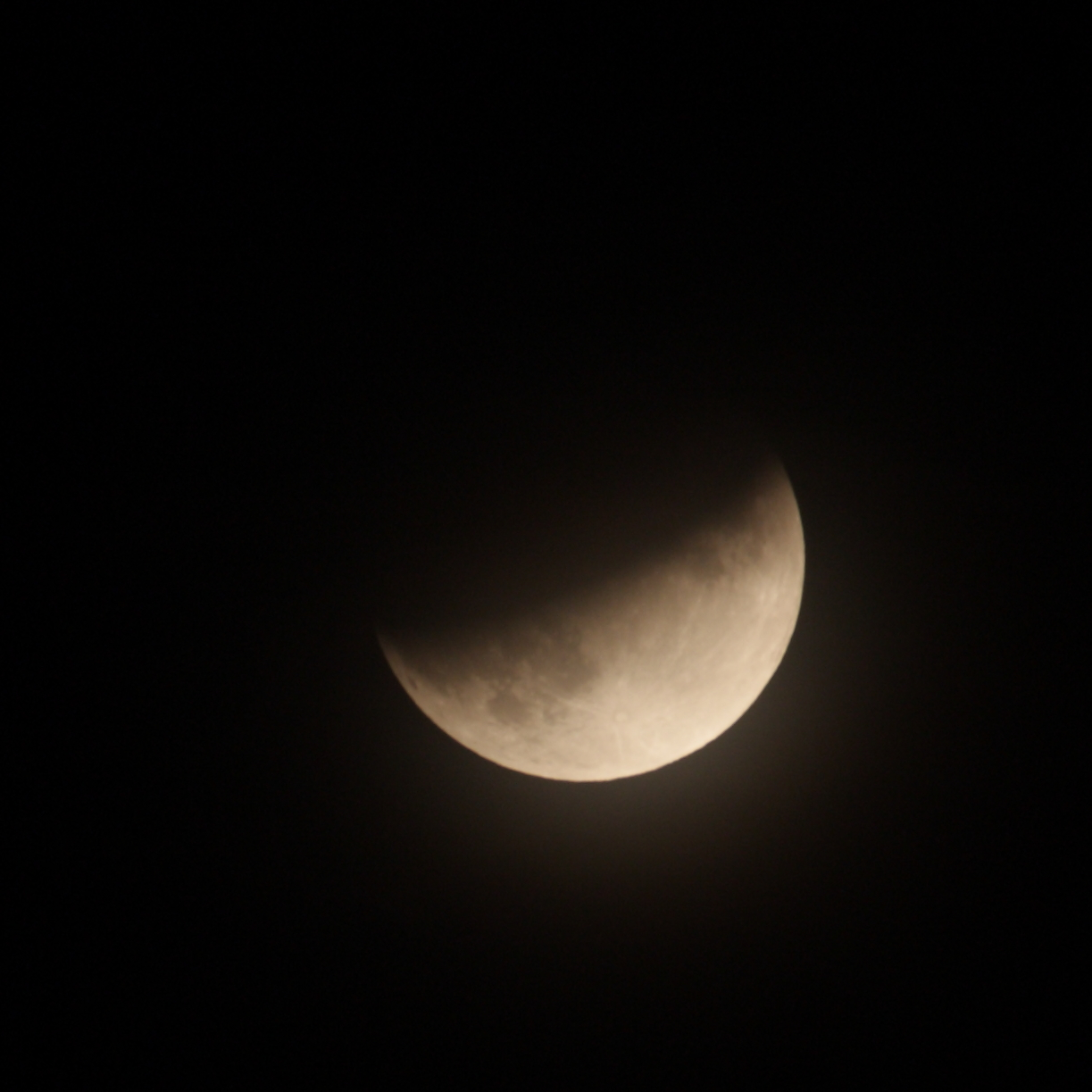
Sapporo, Japan, 11:36 UTC

Animation en California

== Timing ==
The eclipse was seen before sunrise on Saturday morning setting over western North and South America.

Times of over North America
Event	PDT (UTC−7)	MDT (UTC−6)	CDT (UTC−5)	EDT (UTC−4)	UTC
Start penumbral (P1)	1:57 a.m.	2:57 a.m.	3:57 a.m.	4:57 a.m.	8:57 a.m.
Start umbral (U1)	3:17 a.m.	4:17 a.m.	5:17 a.m.	6:17 a.m.	10:17 a.m.
Greatest eclipse	4:38 a.m.	5:38 a.m.	Set	Set	11:38 a.m.
End umbral (U4)	Set	Set	Set	Set	1:00 p.m.
End penumbral (P4)	Set	Set	Set	Set	2:20 p.m.

== Eclipse details ==
Shown below is a table displaying details about this particular solar eclipse. It describes various parameters pertaining to this eclipse.

26 June 2010 Lunar Eclipse Parameters
Parameter	Value
Penumbral Magnitude	1.57888
Umbral Magnitude	0.53830
Gamma	−0.70911
Sun Right Ascension	06h20m48.6s
Sun Declination	+23°21'07.6"
Sun Semi-Diameter	15'44.1"
Sun Equatorial Horizontal Parallax	08.7"
Moon Right Ascension	18h21m11.8s
Moon Declination	-24°00'06.9"
Moon Semi-Diameter	15'07.3"
Moon Equatorial Horizontal Parallax	0°55'29.7"
ΔT	66.2 s

== Eclipse season ==
This eclipse is part of an eclipse season, a period, roughly every six months, when eclipses occur. Only two (or occasionally three) eclipse seasons occur each year, and each season lasts about 35 days and repeats just short of six months (173 days) later; thus two full eclipse seasons always occur each year. Either two or three eclipses happen each eclipse season. In the sequence below, each eclipse is separated by a fortnight.

Eclipse season of June–July 2010
26 June Ascending node (full moon)	July 11 Descending node (new moon)
Partial lunar eclipse Lunar Saros 120	Total solar eclipse Solar Saros 146

== Related eclipses ==
=== Eclipses in 2010 ===
- An annular solar eclipse on January 15.
- A partial lunar eclipse on 26 June.
- A total solar eclipse on July 11.
- A total lunar eclipse on December 21.

=== Metonic ===
- Preceded by: Lunar eclipse of September 5, 2006
- Followed by: Lunar eclipse of April 15, 2014

=== Tzolkinex ===
- Preceded by: Lunar eclipse of May 16, 2003
- Followed by: Lunar eclipse of August 7, 2017

=== Half-Saros ===
- Preceded by: Solar eclipse of June 21, 2001
- Followed by: Solar eclipse of July 2, 2019

=== Tritos ===
- Preceded by: Lunar eclipse of July 28, 1999
- Followed by: Lunar eclipse of May 26, 2021

=== Lunar Saros 120 ===
- Preceded by: Lunar eclipse of June 15, 1992
- Followed by: Lunar eclipse of July 6, 2028

=== Inex ===
- Preceded by: Lunar eclipse of July 17, 1981
- Followed by: Lunar eclipse of June 6, 2039

=== Triad ===
- Preceded by: Lunar eclipse of August 26, 1923
- Followed by: Lunar eclipse of April 26, 2097

=== Lunar eclipses of 2009–2013 ===
This eclipse is a member of a semester series. An eclipse in a semester series of lunar eclipses repeats approximately every 177 days and 4 hours (a semester) at alternating nodes of the Moon's orbit.

The penumbral lunar eclipses on February 9, 2009 and August 6, 2009 occur in the previous lunar year eclipse set, and the lunar eclipses on April 25, 2013 (partial) and October 18, 2013 (penumbral) occur in the next lunar year eclipse set.

Lunar eclipse series sets from 2009 to 2013
Ascending node				Descending node			
Saros	Date Viewing	Type Chart	Gamma	Saros	Date Viewing	Type Chart	Gamma
110	2009 Jul 07	Penumbral	−1.4916	115	2009 Dec 31	Partial	0.9766
120	2010 Jun 26	Partial	−0.7091	125	2010 Dec 21	Total	0.3214
130	2011 Jun 15	Total	0.0897	135	2011 Dec 10	Total	−0.3882
140	2012 Jun 04	Partial	0.8248	145	2012 Nov 28	Penumbral	−1.0869
150	2013 May 25	Penumbral	1.5351				

=== Metonic series ===
The Metonic cycle repeats nearly exactly every 19 years and represents a Saros cycle plus one lunar year. Because it occurs on the same calendar date, the Earth's shadow will be in nearly the same location relative to the background stars.

Ascending node	Descending node
1. 1991 Jun 27 - penumbral (110); 2. 2010 Jun 26 - partial (120); 3. 2029 Jun 26 - total (130); 4. 2048 Jun 26 - partial (140); 5. 2067 Jun 27 - penumbral (150)	1. 1991 Dec 21 - partial (115); 2. 2010 Dec 21 - total (125); 3. 2029 Dec 20 - total (135); 4. 2048 Dec 20 - partial (145)

=== Saros 120 ===
This eclipse is a part of Saros series 120, repeating every 18 years, 11 days, and containing 83 events. The series started with a penumbral lunar eclipse on October 16, 1000. It contains partial eclipses from May 31, 1379 through August 4, 1487; total eclipses from August 14, 1505 through May 14, 1938; and a second set of partial eclipses from May 24, 1956 through July 28, 2064. The series ends at member 83 as a penumbral eclipse on April 7, 2479.

The longest duration of totality was produced by member 43 at 104 minutes, 55 seconds on January 24, 1758. All eclipses in this series occur at the Moon’s ascending node of orbit.

Greatest	First			
The greatest eclipse of the series occurred on 1758 Jan 24, lasting 104 minutes, 55 seconds.	Penumbral	Partial	Total	Central
The greatest eclipse of the series occurred on 1758 Jan 24, lasting 104 minutes, 55 seconds.	1000 Oct 16	1379 May 31	1505 Aug 14	1559 Sep 16
The greatest eclipse of the series occurred on 1758 Jan 24, lasting 104 minutes, 55 seconds.	Last			
The greatest eclipse of the series occurred on 1758 Jan 24, lasting 104 minutes, 55 seconds.	Central	Total	Partial	Penumbral
The greatest eclipse of the series occurred on 1758 Jan 24, lasting 104 minutes, 55 seconds.	1902 Apr 22	1938 May 14	2064 Jul 28	2479 Apr 07

Eclipses are tabulated in three columns; every third eclipse in the same column is one exeligmos apart, so they all cast shadows over approximately the same parts of the Earth.

Series members 46–67 occur between 1801 and 2200:
46	47	48
1812 Feb 27	1830 Mar 09	1848 Mar 19
49	50	51
1866 Mar 31	1884 Apr 10	1902 Apr 22
52	53	54
1920 May 03	1938 May 14	1956 May 24
55	56	57
1974 Jun 04	1992 Jun 15	2010 Jun 26
58	59	60
2028 Jul 06	2046 Jul 18	2064 Jul 28
61	62	63
2082 Aug 08	2100 Aug 19	2118 Aug 31
64	65	66
2136 Sep 10	2154 Sep 21	2172 Oct 02
67
2190 Oct 13

=== Tritos series ===
This eclipse is a part of a tritos cycle, repeating at alternating nodes every 135 synodic months (≈ 3986.63 days, or 11 years minus 1 month). Their appearance and longitude are irregular due to a lack of synchronization with the anomalistic month (period of perigee), but groupings of 3 tritos cycles (≈ 33 years minus 3 months) come close (≈ 434.044 anomalistic months), so eclipses are similar in these groupings.

Series members between 1801 and 2200
1803 Feb 06 (Saros 101)	1814 Jan 06 (Saros 102)	1824 Dec 06 (Saros 103)		1846 Oct 04 (Saros 105)
1857 Sep 04 (Saros 106)	1868 Aug 03 (Saros 107)	1879 Jul 03 (Saros 108)	1890 Jun 03 (Saros 109)	1901 May 03 (Saros 110)
1912 Apr 01 (Saros 111)	1923 Mar 03 (Saros 112)	1934 Jan 30 (Saros 113)	1944 Dec 29 (Saros 114)	1955 Nov 29 (Saros 115)
1966 Oct 29 (Saros 116)	1977 Sep 27 (Saros 117)	1988 Aug 27 (Saros 118)	1999 Jul 28 (Saros 119)	2010 Jun 26 (Saros 120)
2021 May 26 (Saros 121)	2032 Apr 25 (Saros 122)	2043 Mar 25 (Saros 123)	2054 Feb 22 (Saros 124)	2065 Jan 22 (Saros 125)
2075 Dec 22 (Saros 126)	2086 Nov 20 (Saros 127)	2097 Oct 21 (Saros 128)	2108 Sep 20 (Saros 129)	2119 Aug 20 (Saros 130)
2130 Jul 21 (Saros 131)	2141 Jun 19 (Saros 132)	2152 May 18 (Saros 133)	2163 Apr 19 (Saros 134)	2174 Mar 18 (Saros 135)
2185 Feb 14 (Saros 136)	2196 Jan 15 (Saros 137)			

=== Inex series ===
This eclipse is a part of the long period inex cycle, repeating at alternating nodes, every 358 synodic months (≈ 10,571.95 days, or 29 years minus 20 days). Their appearance and longitude are irregular due to a lack of synchronization with the anomalistic month (period of perigee). However, groupings of 3 inex cycles (≈ 87 years minus 2 months) comes close (≈ 1,151.02 anomalistic months), so eclipses are similar in these groupings.

Series members between 1801 and 2200
1807 Nov 15 (Saros 113)	1836 Oct 24 (Saros 114)	1865 Oct 04 (Saros 115)
1894 Sep 15 (Saros 116)	1923 Aug 26 (Saros 117)	1952 Aug 05 (Saros 118)
1981 Jul 17 (Saros 119)	2010 Jun 26 (Saros 120)	2039 Jun 06 (Saros 121)
2068 May 17 (Saros 122)	2097 Apr 26 (Saros 123)	2126 Apr 07 (Saros 124)
2155 Mar 19 (Saros 125)	2184 Feb 26 (Saros 126)	

=== Half-Saros cycle ===
A lunar eclipse will be preceded and followed by solar eclipses by 9 years and 5.5 days (a half saros). This lunar eclipse is related to two total solar eclipses of Solar Saros 127.

June 21, 2001	July 2, 2019

== See also ==
- List of lunar eclipses and List of 21st-century lunar eclipses
