= R. Jay GaBany =

American astronomer and astrophotographer

Robert Jay GaBany
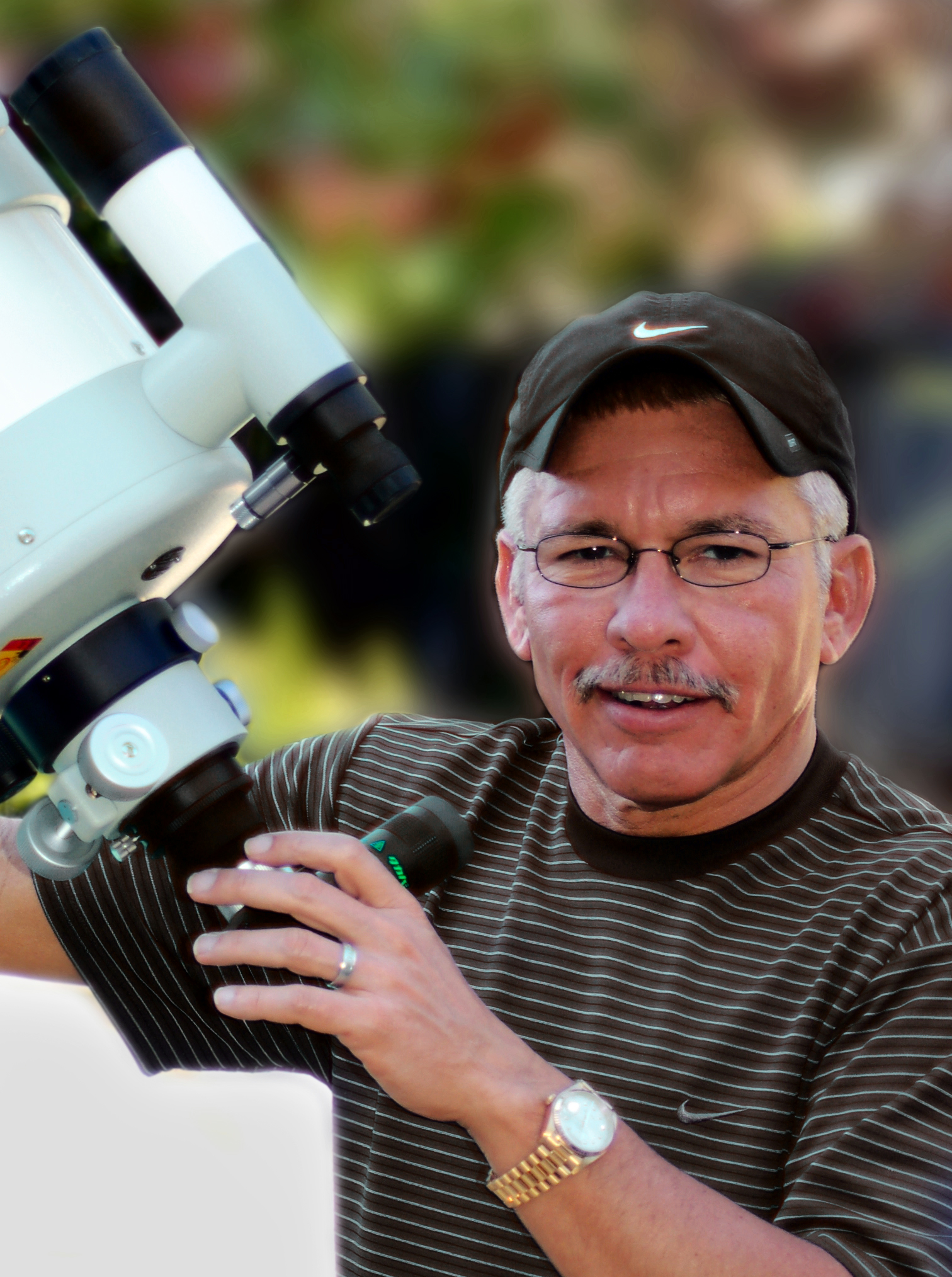
- Born: September 17, 1954 (age 72); Charleston, West Virginia, United States
- Education: Marshall University B.A.
- Known for: Astrophotography
- Awards: Chambliss Amateur Achievement Award
- Scientific career
- Fields: Astrophotography, Stellar streams

Robert Jay GaBany (born September 17, 1954, in Charleston, West Virginia) is an American amateur astronomer and astrophotographer who is also known for his work with an international team of astrophysicists led by Dr. David Martínez-Delgado (Max Planck Institute for Astronomy). GaBany helped pioneer the use of modest size telescopes and off the shelf CCD-cameras to produce long exposure images that revealed ancient galactic merger remnants in the form of star streams surrounding nearby galaxies that were previously undetected or suspected.

== Research ==
Using a half-meter telescope at the remote Black Bird Observatory, GaBany has been one of the world's leading amateur astrophotographers for the past decade. In recent years, GaBany has devoted hundreds of hours to work with a team of astronomers led by Martínez-Delgado of the Max Planck Institute for Astronomy in Germany to produce ultra-deep CCD images of galaxies far beyond the Local Group.

GaBany's images have revealed faint tidal streams and rings in the outer halos of large spiral galaxies, indicative of recent and ongoing gravitational interactions with dwarf satellite galaxies. These images are helping scientists better understand how large galaxies such as our own Milky Way are built up through the collisions and mergers of many smaller galaxies.

Observing under very dark skies, and using very sensitive cameras, long exposure times, and advanced imaging and processing techniques, GaBany has managed to capture details not seen in professional images. Papers based on GaBany's images have been published in leading scientific journals such as the Astrophysical Journal, the Astronomical Journal, and Astronomy & Astrophysics, with GaBany listed as a coauthor.

== Scientific collaborations ==
GaBany's scientific collaboration with professional astronomers has resulted in his participation as co-author of 16 peer-reviewed papers including the discovery of stellar rings around NGC 4013, NGC 5907 and NGC 5055 (M63); the discovery of extended spiral arms around NGC 4736 (M94); the identification of Arps Loop as Milky Way cirrus; a summary of stellar stream discoveries around nearby galaxies; techniques that enable modest instruments to be used for science; a study of the Perseus galaxy cluster core in xrays; the formation of galactic shells from stars and dark matter clumps in a CDM Universe; an investigation into the first discovered stellar stream associated with a dwarf galaxy (NGC 4449).; an investigation of the stream surrounding NGC 4651, the Umbrella Galaxy, that also identified the progenitor's core; the discovery of a new star forming region where a stellar stream intersects with the disk of NGC 5387; the discovery of a stellar tidal stream around NGC 4631, the whale galaxy; the discovery of 11 satellite systems around nearby galaxies with modest telescopes and the discovery of a stellar stream around NGC 253.

== Honours and awards ==
GaBany was awarded the 2010 American Astronomical Society (AAS) Chambliss Amateur Achievement Award for his work with Dr. David Martínez-Delgado (MPIA) into detection of stellar streams around nearby galaxies. Recognizing the contribution of non-professionals to the advancement of astronomical research, the AAS gave the Chambliss Amateur Achievement Award to R. Jay GaBany of San Jose, California, "who has single-handedly, through his dedicated and careful work, spawned a new research direction in the exploration of galaxy evolution via low-surface-brightness imaging of galaxy halo substructure." GaBany has devoted hundreds of hours working with professional astronomers to make deep images that reveal faint tidal streams and rings in the outer halos of galaxies, indicative of recent and ongoing galaxy interactions with dwarf satellites, supporting studies of galaxy formation. He was also inducted into the SBIG Hall of Fame for astrophotography.

During the fall of 2012, the Editors of Time (magazine) included GaBany with their compilation of The 25 Most Influential People in Space in the New Space Discoveries Special Edition. During the summer of 2013, GaBany was again cited as one of The 25 Most Influential People in Space by authors Jeffrey Kluger and Michael D. Lemonick in their book titled New Frontiers of Space- From Mars to the Edge of the Universe. Shortly afterward, the editors of Parade (magazine) included GaBany in their list of the 10 Most Influential People in Space.

== NASA collaboration ==
NASA selected GaBany's image of NGC 3521, the Bubble galaxy, as the uncredited back drop for the official crew portrait of Expedition 30 to the International Space Station.

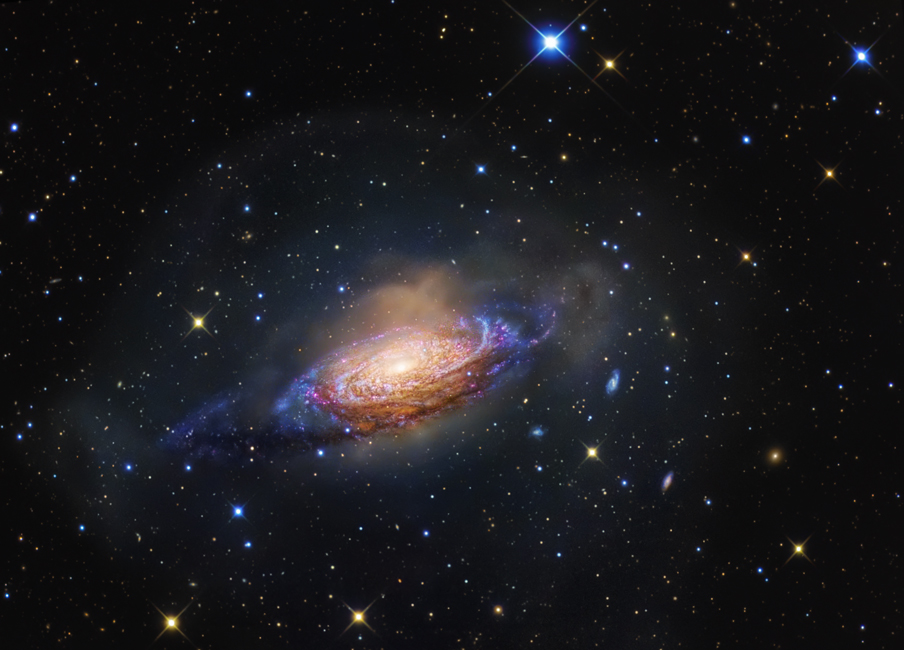
NGC 3521- the Bubble galaxy in Leo

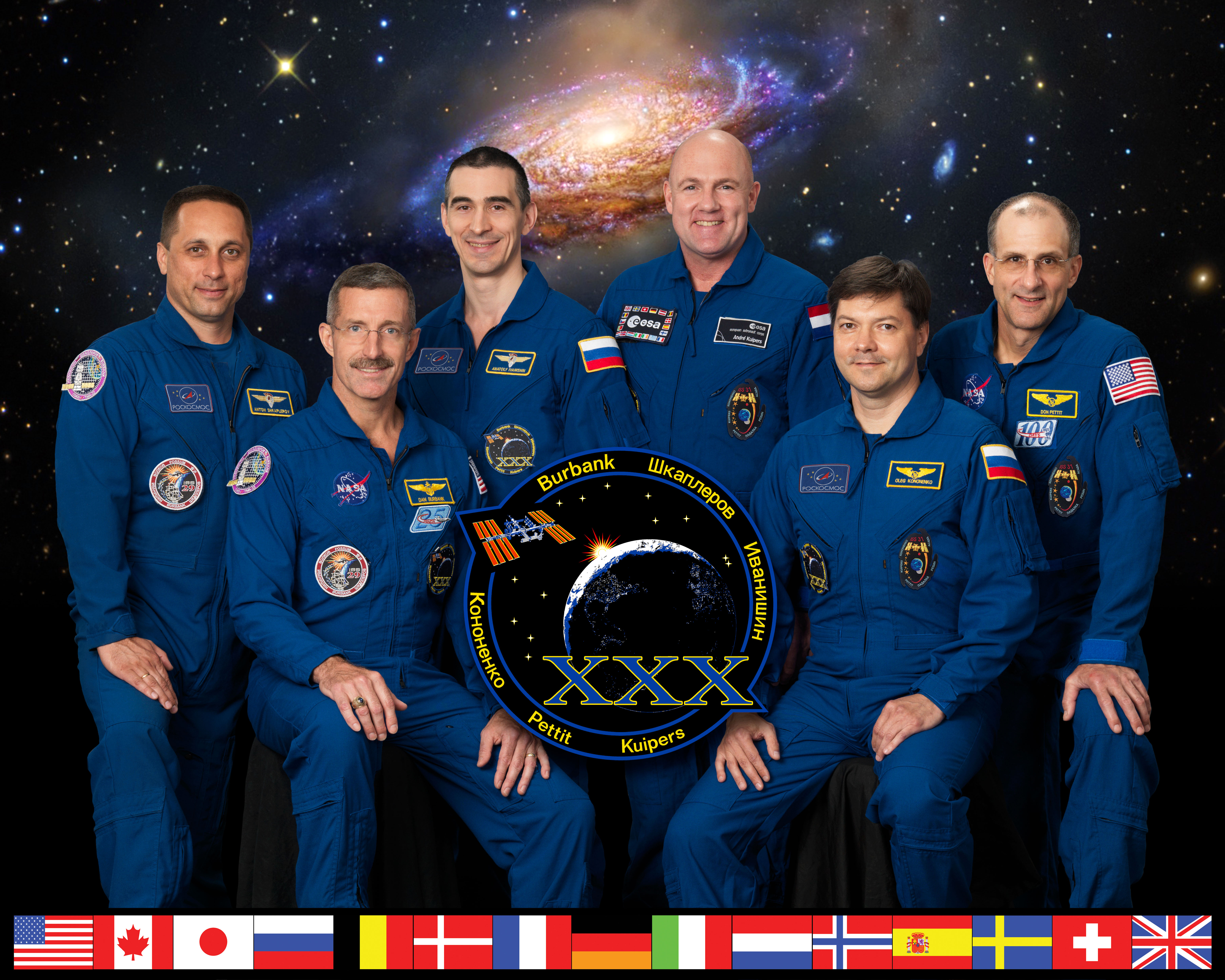
International Space Station Expedition 30 crew portrait

== Media ==
GaBany's images have appeared in many of the world's leading astronomical magazines including Astronomi (Norway), AstronomíA (Spain), Astronomie (France), Astronomy (USA), AstronomyNow (UK), Beautiful Universe (USA), CIEL et Espace (France), Ciencia Hoy (Argentina), Coelum Astronomia (Italy), Hoshi Navi (Japan), Le Estelle (Italy), Nojum (Iran), Populär Astronomi (Sweden), Practical Astronomer (UK), SkyNews (Canada), Sky & Telescope (USA), Spectacular Universe (USA) and Sterne Und Weltraum (Germany). His images have also appeared in the journal Nature, the journal Science and on the cover of the journal Astronomy and Astrophysics. Several articles discussing astro-photographic techniques and his scientific collaborations have also appeared in print.

Many of his images have also been featured on the Astronomy Picture of the Day (APOD) web site.

== Publications ==
In addition to over 50 published articles in numerous popular astronomical magazines and on-line blogs, GaBany published his first book titled Breakthrough-100 Astronomical Images that Changed the World with co-author Robert Gendler in the fall of 2015. The book explores the history of astrophotography through the lens of 100 groundbreaking images that altered humanity's perception of its place in the universe.

== Professional career ==
In addition to his private pursuit of astronomy and astro-photography, GaBany has consulted businesses in the travel sector and managed Corporate travel management services provided by the American Automobile Association and CWT for companies throughout the east, northeast, mid-west and southern United States. Since the mid-1990s, he has served as an eCommerce software product manager in California's Silicon Valley and has been the recipient of five patent awards: 8,117,073, 7,925,540, 7,711,586, 7,660,743 and 7,493,261. GaBany currently works as a product manager for Wells Fargo in San Francisco, California.
