= Solar eclipse of January 24, 1925 =

Total eclipse

- Total eclipse
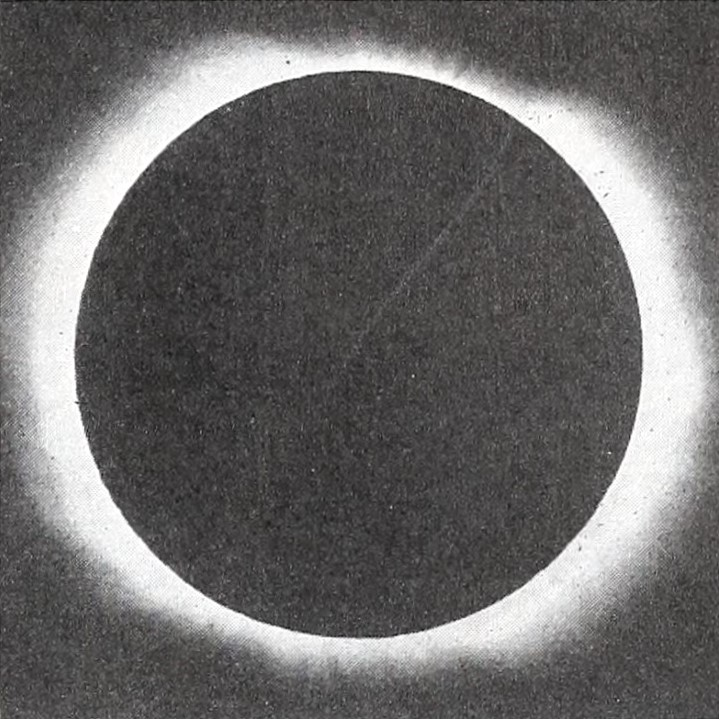
- Totality seen from New Haven, Connecticut, United States

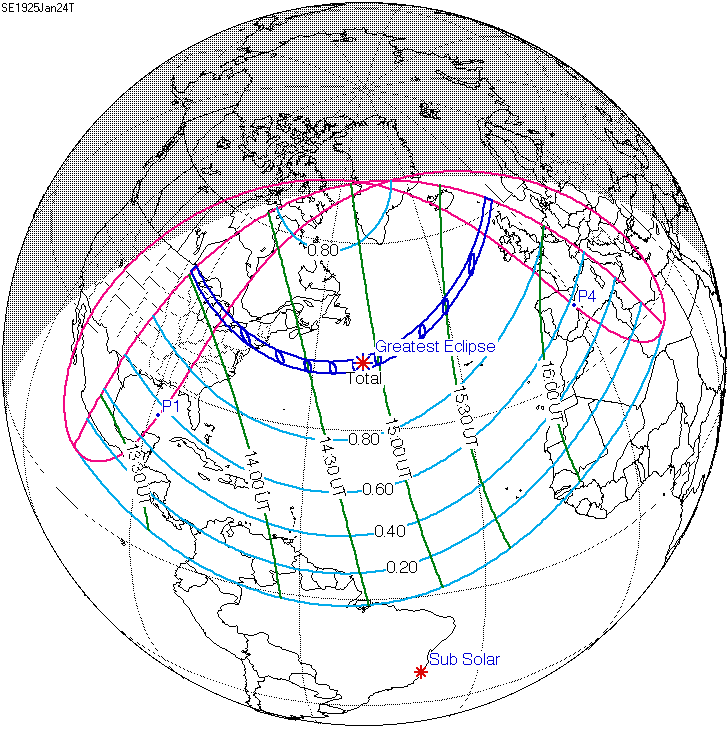
- Map
- Gamma: 0.8661
- Magnitude: 1.0304

Maximum eclipse
- Duration: 152 s (2 min 32 s)
- Coordinates: 40.5°N 49.6°W
- Max. width of band: 206 km (128 mi)

Times (UTC)
- Greatest eclipse: 14:54:03

References
- Saros: 120 (56 of 71)
- Catalog # (SE5000): 9339

A total solar eclipse occurred at the Moon's descending node of orbit on Saturday, January 24, 1925, with a magnitude of 1.0304. A solar eclipse occurs when the Moon passes between Earth and the Sun, thereby totally or partly obscuring the image of the Sun for a viewer on Earth. A total solar eclipse occurs when the Moon's apparent diameter is larger than the Sun's, blocking all direct sunlight, turning day into darkness. Totality occurs in a narrow path across Earth's surface, with the partial solar eclipse visible over a surrounding region thousands of kilometres wide. Occurring about 1.1 days after perigee (on January 23, 1925, at 13:30 UTC), the Moon's apparent diameter was larger.

Totality was visible from southwestern and southeastern Ontario in Canada (including Toronto and Niagara Falls), Minnesota, Wisconsin, Michigan, Pennsylvania, New York (including the northern part of New York City), New Jersey, Connecticut, Rhode Island, and Massachusetts. A partial eclipse was visible for parts of North America, Central America, the Caribbean, northern South America, West Africa, and Western Europe.

== Observations ==
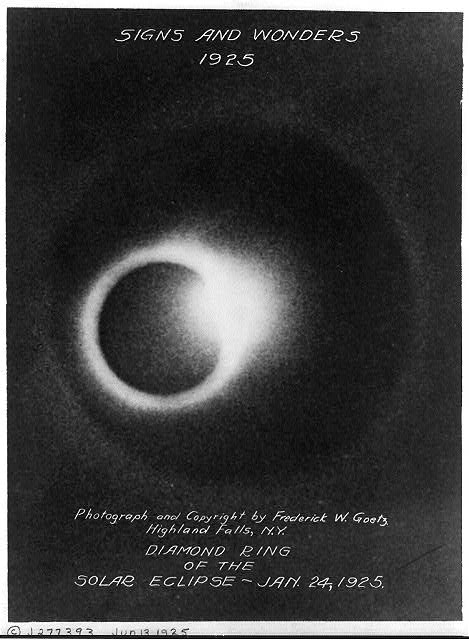
The "diamond ring" corona, as seen from New York City on January 24, 1925

It was seen in New York City; people north of 96th Street in Manhattan saw a total solar eclipse.

Visual and radio observations were conducted by researchers working with Scientific American.

== Eclipse details ==
Shown below are two tables displaying details about this particular solar eclipse. The first table outlines times at which the Moon's penumbra or umbra attains the specific parameter, and the second table describes various other parameters pertaining to this eclipse.

January 24, 1925 Solar Eclipse Times
Event	Time (UTC)
First Penumbral External Contact	1925 January 24 at 12:41:48.8 UTC
First Umbral External Contact	1925 January 24 at 14:01:18.9 UTC
First Central Line	1925 January 24 at 14:02:31.1 UTC
First Umbral Internal Contact	1925 January 24 at 14:03:44.6 UTC
Ecliptic Conjunction	1925 January 24 at 14:45:16.3 UTC
Greatest Duration	1925 January 24 at 14:53:02.2 UTC
Greatest Eclipse	1925 January 24 at 14:54:03.1 UTC
Equatorial Conjunction	1925 January 24 at 15:06:52.3 UTC
Last Umbral Internal Contact	1925 January 24 at 15:44:13.9 UTC
Last Central Line	1925 January 24 at 15:45:26.2 UTC
Last Umbral External Contact	1925 January 24 at 15:46:37.2 UTC
Last Penumbral External Contact	1925 January 24 at 17:06:14.1 UTC

January 24, 1925 Solar Eclipse Parameters
Parameter	Value
Eclipse Magnitude	1.03044
Eclipse Obscuration	1.06180
Gamma	0.86613
Sun Right Ascension	20h25m51.5s
Sun Declination	-19°13'44.3"
Sun Semi-Diameter	16'14.7"
Sun Equatorial Horizontal Parallax	08.9"
Moon Right Ascension	20h25m20.3s
Moon Declination	-18°21'36.7"
Moon Semi-Diameter	16'36.2"
Moon Equatorial Horizontal Parallax	1°00'56.2"
ΔT	23.6 s

== Eclipse season ==
This eclipse is part of an eclipse season, a period, roughly every six months, when eclipses occur. Only two (or occasionally three) eclipse seasons occur each year, and each season lasts about 35 days and repeats just short of six months (173 days) later; thus two full eclipse seasons always occur each year. Either two or three eclipses happen each eclipse season. In the sequence below, each eclipse is separated by a fortnight.

Eclipse season of January–February 1925
January 24 Descending node (new moon)	February 8 Ascending node (full moon)
Annular solar eclipse Solar Saros 120	Penumbral lunar eclipse Lunar Saros 132

== Related eclipses ==
=== Eclipses in 1925 ===
- A total solar eclipse on January 24.
- A partial lunar eclipse on February 8.
- An annular solar eclipse on July 20.
- A partial lunar eclipse on August 4.

=== Metonic ===
- Preceded by: Solar eclipse of April 8, 1921
- Followed by: Solar eclipse of November 12, 1928

=== Tzolkinex ===
- Preceded by: Solar eclipse of December 14, 1917
- Followed by: Solar eclipse of March 7, 1932

=== Half-Saros ===
- Preceded by: Lunar eclipse of January 20, 1916
- Followed by: Lunar eclipse of January 30, 1934

=== Tritos ===
- Preceded by: Solar eclipse of February 25, 1914
- Followed by: Solar eclipse of December 25, 1935

=== Solar Saros 120 ===
- Preceded by: Solar eclipse of January 14, 1907
- Followed by: Solar eclipse of February 4, 1943

=== Inex ===
- Preceded by: Solar eclipse of February 13, 1896
- Followed by: Solar eclipse of January 5, 1954

=== Triad ===
- Preceded by: Solar eclipse of March 25, 1838
- Followed by: Solar eclipse of November 25, 2011

=== Solar eclipses of 1924–1928 ===
This eclipse is a member of a semester series. An eclipse in a semester series of solar eclipses repeats approximately every 177 days and 4 hours (a semester) at alternating nodes of the Moon's orbit.

The partial solar eclipses on March 5, 1924 and August 30, 1924 occur in the previous lunar year eclipse set, and the solar eclipses on May 19, 1928 and November 12, 1928 occur in the next lunar year eclipse set.

Solar eclipse series sets from 1924 to 1928
Ascending node			Descending node		
Saros	Map	Gamma	Saros	Map	Gamma
115	July 31, 1924 Partial	−1.4459	120	January 24, 1925 Total	0.8661
125	July 20, 1925 Annular	−0.7193	130 Totality in Sumatra, Indonesia	January 14, 1926 Total	0.1973
135	July 9, 1926 Annular	0.0538	140	January 3, 1927 Annular	−0.4956
145	June 29, 1927 Total	0.8163	150	December 24, 1927 Partial	−1.2416
155	June 17, 1928 Partial	1.5107			

=== Saros 120 ===
This eclipse is a part of Saros series 120, repeating every 18 years, 11 days, and containing 71 events. The series started with a partial solar eclipse on May 27, 933 AD. It contains annular eclipses from August 11, 1059 through April 26, 1492; hybrid eclipses from May 8, 1510 through June 8, 1564; and total eclipses from June 20, 1582 through March 30, 2033. The series ends at member 71 as a partial eclipse on July 7, 2195. Its eclipses are tabulated in three columns; every third eclipse in the same column is one exeligmos apart, so they all cast shadows over approximately the same parts of the Earth.

The longest duration of annularity was produced by member 11 at 6 minutes, 24 seconds on September 11, 1113, and the longest duration of totality was produced by member 60 at 2 minutes, 50 seconds on March 9, 1997. All eclipses in this series occur at the Moon’s descending node of orbit.

Series members 50–71 occur between 1801 and 2195:
50	51	52
November 19, 1816	November 30, 1834	December 11, 1852
53	54	55
December 22, 1870	January 1, 1889	January 14, 1907
56	57	58
January 24, 1925	February 4, 1943	February 15, 1961
59	60	61
February 26, 1979	March 9, 1997	March 20, 2015
62	63	64
March 30, 2033	April 11, 2051	April 21, 2069
65	66	67
May 2, 2087	May 14, 2105	May 25, 2123
68	69	70
June 4, 2141	June 16, 2159	June 26, 2177
71
July 7, 2195

=== Metonic series ===
The metonic series repeats eclipses every 19 years (6939.69 days), lasting about 5 cycles. Eclipses occur in nearly the same calendar date. In addition, the octon subseries repeats 1/5 of that or every 3.8 years (1387.94 days). All eclipses in this table occur at the Moon's descending node.

22 eclipse events between April 8, 1902 and August 31, 1989
April 7–8	January 24–25	November 12	August 31–September 1	June 19–20
108	110	112	114	116
April 8, 1902			August 31, 1913	June 19, 1917
118	120	122	124	126
April 8, 1921	January 24, 1925	November 12, 1928	August 31, 1932	June 19, 1936
128	130	132	134	136
April 7, 1940	January 25, 1944	November 12, 1947	September 1, 1951	June 20, 1955
138	140	142	144	146
April 8, 1959	January 25, 1963	November 12, 1966	August 31, 1970	June 20, 1974
148	150	152	154	
April 7, 1978	January 25, 1982	November 12, 1985	August 31, 1989	

=== Tritos series ===
This eclipse is a part of a tritos cycle, repeating at alternating nodes every 135 synodic months (≈ 3986.63 days, or 11 years minus 1 month). Their appearance and longitude are irregular due to a lack of synchronization with the anomalistic month (period of perigee), but groupings of 3 tritos cycles (≈ 33 years minus 3 months) come close (≈ 434.044 anomalistic months), so eclipses are similar in these groupings.

Series members between 1801 and 2200
January 1, 1805 (Saros 109)		October 31, 1826 (Saros 111)		August 28, 1848 (Saros 113)
July 29, 1859 (Saros 114)	June 28, 1870 (Saros 115)	May 27, 1881 (Saros 116)	April 26, 1892 (Saros 117)	March 29, 1903 (Saros 118)
February 25, 1914 (Saros 119)	January 24, 1925 (Saros 120)	December 25, 1935 (Saros 121)	November 23, 1946 (Saros 122)	October 23, 1957 (Saros 123)
September 22, 1968 (Saros 124)	August 22, 1979 (Saros 125)	July 22, 1990 (Saros 126)	June 21, 2001 (Saros 127)	May 20, 2012 (Saros 128)
April 20, 2023 (Saros 129)	March 20, 2034 (Saros 130)	February 16, 2045 (Saros 131)	January 16, 2056 (Saros 132)	December 17, 2066 (Saros 133)
November 15, 2077 (Saros 134)	October 14, 2088 (Saros 135)	September 14, 2099 (Saros 136)	August 15, 2110 (Saros 137)	July 14, 2121 (Saros 138)
June 13, 2132 (Saros 139)	May 14, 2143 (Saros 140)	April 12, 2154 (Saros 141)	March 12, 2165 (Saros 142)	February 10, 2176 (Saros 143)
January 9, 2187 (Saros 144)	December 9, 2197 (Saros 145)			

=== Inex series ===
This eclipse is a part of the long period inex cycle, repeating at alternating nodes, every 358 synodic months (≈ 10,571.95 days, or 29 years minus 20 days). Their appearance and longitude are irregular due to a lack of synchronization with the anomalistic month (period of perigee). However, groupings of 3 inex cycles (≈ 87 years minus 2 months) comes close (≈ 1,151.02 anomalistic months), so eclipses are similar in these groupings.

Series members between 1801 and 2200
April 14, 1809 (Saros 116)	March 25, 1838 (Saros 117)	March 6, 1867 (Saros 118)
February 13, 1896 (Saros 119)	January 24, 1925 (Saros 120)	January 5, 1954 (Saros 121)
December 15, 1982 (Saros 122)	November 25, 2011 (Saros 123)	November 4, 2040 (Saros 124)
October 15, 2069 (Saros 125)	September 25, 2098 (Saros 126)	September 6, 2127 (Saros 127)
August 16, 2156 (Saros 128)	July 26, 2185 (Saros 129)	

== See also ==
- List of solar eclipses visible from the United Kingdom 1000–2090 AD
