= Solar eclipse of June 1, 2030 =

Future annular solar eclipse

- Annular eclipse
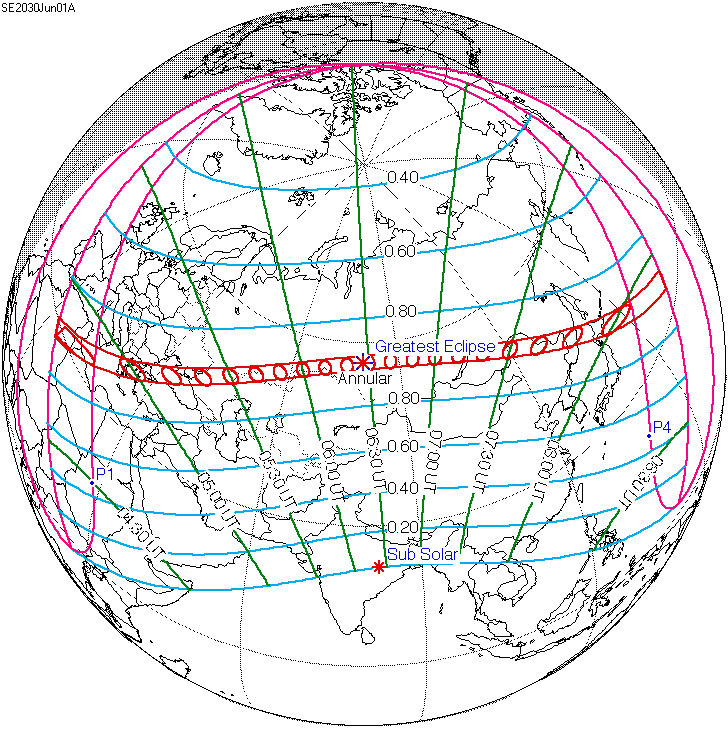
- Map
- Gamma: 0.5626
- Magnitude: 0.9443

Maximum eclipse
- Duration: 321 s (5 min 21 s)
- Coordinates: 56.5°N 80.1°E
- Max. width of band: 250 km (160 mi)

Times (UTC)
- Greatest eclipse: 6:29:13

References
- Saros: 128 (59 of 73)
- Catalog # (SE5000): 9575

An annular solar eclipse will occur at the Moon's descending node of orbit on Saturday, June 1, 2030, with a magnitude of 0.9443. A solar eclipse occurs when the Moon passes between Earth and the Sun, thereby totally or partly obscuring the image of the Sun for a viewer on Earth. An annular solar eclipse occurs when the Moon's apparent diameter is smaller than the Sun's, blocking most of the Sun's light and causing the Sun to look like an annulus (ring). An annular eclipse appears as a partial eclipse over a region of the Earth thousands of kilometres wide. Occurring about 23 hours after apogee (on May 31, 2030, at 7:15 UTC), the Moon's apparent diameter will be smaller.

The annular eclipse will start in northern Africa and will cross the Eurasian continent, including Algeria, Tunisia, Libya, Malta, Greece, northwestern Turkey, southeastern Bulgaria, southeastern Ukraine, Russia, northern Kazakhstan, northeastern China and northern Japan. It will also pass through a number of large cities such as Tripoli, Athens, Istanbul, Krasnodar, Rostov-on-Don, Volgograd, Omsk, Krasnoyarsk and Sapporo. The greatest eclipse will be near the border of Tomsk and Novosibirsk oblasts, ~200 km west of Tomsk. A partial eclipse will be visible for much of North Africa, Europe, Asia, Alaska, and northern Canada.

== Images ==
Interactive map of the path of the Umbral Shadow

Animated path

== Eclipse timing ==
=== Places experiencing annular eclipse ===
Solar Eclipse of June 1, 2030 (Local Times)
Country or territory	City or place	Start of partial eclipse	Start of annular eclipse	Maximum eclipse	End of annular eclipse	End of partial eclipse	Duration of annularity (min:s)	Duration of eclipse (hr:min)	Maximum coverage
Libya	Tripoli	05:59:56 (sunrise)	06:49:07	06:51:04	06:53:01	07:59:09	3:54	1:59	87.43%
Algeria	Hassi Messaoud	05:31:16 (sunrise)	05:50:18	05:51:46	05:53:13	06:56:17	2:55	1:25	87.15%
Tunisia	Zarzis	05:06:42 (sunrise)	05:50:30	05:52:23	05:54:18	06:59:35	3:48	1:53	87.38%
Tunisia	Houmt Souk	05:06:47 (sunrise)	05:51:32	05:52:58	05:54:23	07:00:05	2:51	1:53	87.38%
Tunisia	Gabès	05:09:48 (sunrise)	05:52:30	05:53:11	05:53:50	06:59:56	1:20	1:50	87.35%
Malta	Valletta	05:52:59	06:54:13	06:55:01	06:55:48	08:04:19	1:35	2:11	87.56%
Greece	Kalamata	06:51:10	07:54:31	07:56:24	07:58:16	09:10:09	3:45	2:19	87.86%
Greece	Olympia	06:52:10	07:55:04	07:57:19	07:59:33	09:10:53	4:29	2:19	87.86%
Greece	Piraeus	06:51:56	07:55:59	07:58:00	07:59:59	09:12:48	4:00	2:21	87.94%
Greece	Athens	06:51:57	07:56:03	07:58:03	08:00:03	09:12:55	4:00	2:21	87.95%
Greece	Argostoli	06:53:19	07:56:17	07:58:07	07:59:56	09:11:05	3:39	2:18	87.83%
Greece	Patras	06:52:58	07:56:07	07:58:18	08:00:27	09:12:00	4:20	2:19	87.88%
Greece	Preveza	06:54:20	07:58:44	07:59:22	07:59:59	09:12:35	1:15	2:18	87.86%
Turkey	Bursa	06:54:01	08:01:26	08:02:58	08:04:28	09:21:29	3:02	2:27	88.19%
Turkey	Istanbul	06:55:17	08:02:06	08:04:22	08:06:37	09:22:55	4:31	2:28	88.20%
Ukraine	Sevastopol	07:00:53	08:10:53	08:12:46	08:14:38	09:34:22	3:45	2:33	88.42%
Ukraine	Alushta	07:01:00	08:11:09	08:13:20	08:15:32	09:35:33	4:23	2:35	88.45%
Ukraine	Simferopol	07:01:28	08:11:53	08:13:41	08:15:29	09:35:40	3:36	2:34	88.44%
Russia	Novorossiysk	07:01:23	08:13:31	08:15:30	08:17:28	09:40:00	3:57	2:39	88.57%
Russia	Volgograd	07:10:16	08:25:52	08:28:19	08:30:47	09:56:28	4:55	2:46	88.81%
Kazakhstan	Oral	09:18:17	10:37:27	10:39:59	10:42:31	12:11:01	5:04	2:53	88.99%
Russia	Magnitogorsk	09:27:48	10:50:29	10:53:04	10:55:40	12:26:06	5:11	2:58	89.14%
Russia	Chelyabinsk	09:33:05	10:58:29	10:58:48	10:59:06	12:31:08	0:37	2:58	89.16%
Kazakhstan	Petropavl	09:40:15	11:07:22	11:09:43	11:12:05	12:44:07	4:43	3:04	89.27%
Russia	Omsk	10:45:27	12:15:11	12:16:33	12:17:54	13:51:10	2:43	3:06	89.31%
Russia	Tomsk	12:03:09	13:33:18	13:35:55	13:38:32	15:07:50	5:14	3:05	89.30%
Russia	Krasnoyarsk	12:15:13	13:46:25	13:48:48	13:51:11	15:18:43	4:46	3:04	89.27%
Japan	Asahikawa	15:40:45	16:53:36	16:55:42	16:57:48	18:02:23	4:12	2:22	88.02%
Japan	Sapporo	15:41:13	16:54:33	16:56:42	16:58:50	18:03:41	4:17	2:22	88.04%
Japan	Kushiro	15:43:30	16:55:13	16:57:14	16:59:14	18:02:56	4:01	2:19	87.93%

=== Places experiencing partial eclipse ===
Solar Eclipse of June 1, 2030 (Local Times)
Country or territory	City or place	Start of partial eclipse	Maximum eclipse	End of partial eclipse	Duration of eclipse (hr:min)	Maximum coverage
Egypt	Cairo	06:41:05	07:47:01	09:03:01	2:22	63.38%
Tunisia	Tunis	05:01:50 (sunrise)	05:57:09	07:04:16	2:02	82.62%
Algeria	Algiers	05:30:26 (sunrise)	05:59:20	07:02:54	1:32	75.83%
Greece	Thessaloniki	06:56:05	08:02:20	09:17:01	2:21	87.39%
Albania	Tirana	05:58:12	07:03:11	08:15:58	2:18	83.23%
Turkey	Ankara	06:53:16	08:03:56	09:24:55	2:32	85.31%
Italy	Rome	06:02:25	07:04:18	08:12:48	2:10	74.73%
Vatican City	Vatican City	06:02:27	07:04:20	08:12:48	2:10	74.69%
North Macedonia	Skopje	05:58:40	07:04:25	08:18:13	2:20	83.55%
Montenegro	Podgorica	06:00:09	07:04:58	08:17:26	2:17	80.47%
Bulgaria	Sofia	06:59:11	08:05:54	09:20:52	2:22	84.07%
Spain	Madrid	06:46:54 (sunrise)	07:06:55	08:07:11	1:20	62.72%
Bosnia and Herzegovina	Sarajevo	06:02:46	07:07:18	08:19:10	2:16	76.79%
Serbia	Belgrade	06:03:36	07:09:07	08:22:12	2:19	76.98%
Romania	Bucharest	07:01:22	08:09:33	09:26:14	2:25	83.45%
Croatia	Zagreb	06:07:01	07:10:31	08:20:46	2:14	70.66%
Hungary	Budapest	06:08:43	07:13:37	08:25:30	2:17	70.48%
Austria	Vienna	06:11:00	07:14:39	08:24:47	2:14	66.65%
Moldova	Chișinău	07:05:29	08:15:09	09:33:20	2:28	81.03%
Georgia	Tbilisi	07:58:12	09:15:26	10:44:44	2:47	76.39%
Ukraine	Dnipro	07:07:55	08:20:49	09:42:48	2:35	84.18%
United Kingdom	London	05:25:31	06:21:47	07:22:12	1:57	47.81%
Ukraine	Kyiv	07:11:47	08:22:13	09:40:41	2:29	75.79%
Poland	Warsaw	06:16:57	07:22:29	08:34:29	2:18	63.73%
Russia	Moscow	07:22:58	08:36:12	09:56:39	2:34	71.35%
Kazakhstan	Astana	09:37:24	11:10:00	12:48:00	3:11	80.24%
Mongolia	Ulaanbaatar	13:43:49	15:19:50	16:45:32	3:02	73.84%
China	Beijing	14:15:56	15:46:08	17:03:34	2:48	58.49%
South Korea	Seoul	15:37:28	16:59:55	18:11:01	2:34	63.10%
Japan	Tokyo	15:53:26	17:07:53	18:13:14	2:20	72.35%

== Eclipse details ==
Shown below are two tables displaying details about this particular solar eclipse. The first table outlines times at which the Moon's penumbra or umbra attains the specific parameter, and the second table describes various other parameters pertaining to this eclipse.

June 1, 2030 Solar Eclipse Times
Event	Time (UTC)
First Penumbral External Contact	2030 June 1 at 03:35:53.3 UTC
First Umbral External Contact	2030 June 1 at 04:48:25.8 UTC
First Central Line	2030 June 1 at 04:51:16.8 UTC
First Umbral Internal Contact	2030 June 1 at 04:54:09.4 UTC
Ecliptic Conjunction	2030 June 1 at 06:22:30.7 UTC
Greatest Eclipse	2030 June 1 at 06:29:12.9 UTC
Greatest Duration	2030 June 1 at 06:29:55.1 UTC
Equatorial Conjunction	2030 June 1 at 06:31:58.0 UTC
Last Umbral Internal Contact	2030 June 1 at 08:04:14.9 UTC
Last Central Line	2030 June 1 at 08:07:06.9 UTC
Last Umbral External Contact	2030 June 1 at 08:09:57.3 UTC
Last Penumbral External Contact	2030 June 1 at 09:22:29.8 UTC

June 1, 2030 Solar Eclipse Parameters
Parameter	Value
Eclipse Magnitude	0.94426
Eclipse Obscuration	0.89163
Gamma	0.56265
Sun Right Ascension	04h37m01.2s
Sun Declination	+22°03'55.3"
Sun Semi-Diameter	15'46.4"
Sun Equatorial Horizontal Parallax	08.7"
Moon Right Ascension	04h36m55.8s
Moon Declination	+22°34'11.5"
Moon Semi-Diameter	14'42.7"
Moon Equatorial Horizontal Parallax	0°53'59.6"
ΔT	74.0 s

== Eclipse season ==
This eclipse is part of an eclipse season, a period, roughly every six months, when eclipses occur. Only two (or occasionally three) eclipse seasons occur each year, and each season lasts about 35 days and repeats just short of six months (173 days) later; thus two full eclipse seasons always occur each year. Either two or three eclipses happen each eclipse season. In the sequence below, each eclipse is separated by a fortnight.

Eclipse season of June 2030
June 1 Descending node (new moon)	June 15 Ascending node (full moon)
Annular solar eclipse Solar Saros 128	Partial lunar eclipse Lunar Saros 140

== Related eclipses ==
=== Eclipses in 2030 ===
- An annular solar eclipse on June 1.
- A partial lunar eclipse on June 15.
- A total solar eclipse on November 25.
- A penumbral lunar eclipse on December 9.

=== Metonic ===
- Preceded by: Solar eclipse of August 12, 2026
- Followed by: Solar eclipse of March 20, 2034

=== Tzolkinex ===
- Preceded by: Solar eclipse of April 20, 2023
- Followed by: Solar eclipse of July 13, 2037

=== Half-Saros ===
- Preceded by: Lunar eclipse of May 26, 2021
- Followed by: Lunar eclipse of June 6, 2039

=== Tritos ===
- Preceded by: Solar eclipse of July 2, 2019
- Followed by: Solar eclipse of April 30, 2041

=== Solar Saros 128 ===
- Preceded by: Solar eclipse of May 20, 2012
- Followed by: Solar eclipse of June 11, 2048

=== Inex ===
- Preceded by: Solar eclipse of June 21, 2001
- Followed by: Solar eclipse of May 11, 2059

=== Triad ===
- Preceded by: Solar eclipse of August 1, 1943
- Followed by: Solar eclipse of April 2, 2117

=== Solar eclipses of 2029–2032 ===
This eclipse is a member of a semester series. An eclipse in a semester series of solar eclipses repeats approximately every 177 days and 4 hours (a semester) at alternating nodes of the Moon's orbit.

The partial solar eclipses on January 14, 2029 and July 11, 2029 occur in the previous lunar year eclipse set.

Solar eclipse series sets from 2029 to 2032
Descending node			Ascending node		
Saros	Map	Gamma	Saros	Map	Gamma
118	June 12, 2029 Partial	1.29431	123	December 5, 2029 Partial	−1.06090
128	June 1, 2030 Annular	0.56265	133	November 25, 2030 Total	−0.38669
138	May 21, 2031 Annular	−0.19699	143	November 14, 2031 Hybrid	0.30776
148	May 9, 2032 Annular	−0.93748	153	November 3, 2032 Partial	1.06431

=== Saros 128 ===
This eclipse is a part of Saros series 128, repeating every 18 years, 11 days, and containing 73 events. The series started with a partial solar eclipse on August 29, 984 AD. It contains total eclipses from May 16, 1417 through June 18, 1471; hybrid eclipses from June 28, 1489 through July 31, 1543; and annular eclipses from August 11, 1561 through July 25, 2120. The series ends at member 73 as a partial eclipse on November 1, 2282. Its eclipses are tabulated in three columns; every third eclipse in the same column is one exeligmos apart, so they all cast shadows over approximately the same parts of the Earth.

The longest duration of totality was produced by member 27 at 1 minutes, 45 seconds on June 7, 1453, and the longest duration of annularity was produced by member 48 at 8 minutes, 35 seconds on February 1, 1832. All eclipses in this series occur at the Moon’s descending node of orbit.

Series members 47–68 occur between 1801 and 2200:
47	48	49
January 21, 1814	February 1, 1832	February 12, 1850
50	51	52
February 23, 1868	March 5, 1886	March 17, 1904
53	54	55
March 28, 1922	April 7, 1940	April 19, 1958
56	57	58
April 29, 1976	May 10, 1994	May 20, 2012
59	60	61
June 1, 2030	June 11, 2048	June 22, 2066
62	63	64
July 3, 2084	July 15, 2102	July 25, 2120
65	66	67
August 5, 2138	August 16, 2156	August 27, 2174
68
September 6, 2192

=== Metonic series ===
The metonic series repeats eclipses every 19 years (6939.69 days), lasting about 5 cycles. Eclipses occur in nearly the same calendar date. In addition, the octon subseries repeats 1/5 of that or every 3.8 years (1387.94 days). All eclipses in this table occur at the Moon's descending node.

22 eclipse events between June 1, 2011 and October 24, 2098
May 31–June 1	March 19–20	January 5–6	October 24–25	August 12–13
118	120	122	124	126
June 1, 2011	March 20, 2015	January 6, 2019	October 25, 2022	August 12, 2026
128	130	132	134	136
June 1, 2030	March 20, 2034	January 5, 2038	October 25, 2041	August 12, 2045
138	140	142	144	146
May 31, 2049	March 20, 2053	January 5, 2057	October 24, 2060	August 12, 2064
148	150	152	154	156
May 31, 2068	March 19, 2072	January 6, 2076	October 24, 2079	August 13, 2083
158	160	162	164	
June 1, 2087			October 24, 2098	

=== Tritos series ===
This eclipse is a part of a tritos cycle, repeating at alternating nodes every 135 synodic months (≈ 3986.63 days, or 11 years minus 1 month). Their appearance and longitude are irregular due to a lack of synchronization with the anomalistic month (period of perigee), but groupings of 3 tritos cycles (≈ 33 years minus 3 months) come close (≈ 434.044 anomalistic months), so eclipses are similar in these groupings.

Series members between 1801 and 2200
March 14, 1801 (Saros 107)	February 12, 1812 (Saros 108)	January 12, 1823 (Saros 109)		November 10, 1844 (Saros 111)
		August 9, 1877 (Saros 114)	July 9, 1888 (Saros 115)	June 8, 1899 (Saros 116)
May 9, 1910 (Saros 117)	April 8, 1921 (Saros 118)	March 7, 1932 (Saros 119)	February 4, 1943 (Saros 120)	January 5, 1954 (Saros 121)
December 4, 1964 (Saros 122)	November 3, 1975 (Saros 123)	October 3, 1986 (Saros 124)	September 2, 1997 (Saros 125)	August 1, 2008 (Saros 126)
July 2, 2019 (Saros 127)	June 1, 2030 (Saros 128)	April 30, 2041 (Saros 129)	March 30, 2052 (Saros 130)	February 28, 2063 (Saros 131)
January 27, 2074 (Saros 132)	December 27, 2084 (Saros 133)	November 27, 2095 (Saros 134)	October 26, 2106 (Saros 135)	September 26, 2117 (Saros 136)
August 25, 2128 (Saros 137)	July 25, 2139 (Saros 138)	June 25, 2150 (Saros 139)	May 25, 2161 (Saros 140)	April 23, 2172 (Saros 141)
March 23, 2183 (Saros 142)	February 21, 2194 (Saros 143)			

=== Inex series ===
This eclipse is a part of the long period inex cycle, repeating at alternating nodes, every 358 synodic months (≈ 10,571.95 days, or 29 years minus 20 days). Their appearance and longitude are irregular due to a lack of synchronization with the anomalistic month (period of perigee). However, groupings of 3 inex cycles (≈ 87 years minus 2 months) comes close (≈ 1,151.02 anomalistic months), so eclipses are similar in these groupings.

Series members between 1801 and 2200
October 20, 1827 (Saros 121)	September 29, 1856 (Saros 122)	September 8, 1885 (Saros 123)
August 21, 1914 (Saros 124)	August 1, 1943 (Saros 125)	July 10, 1972 (Saros 126)
June 21, 2001 (Saros 127)	June 1, 2030 (Saros 128)	May 11, 2059 (Saros 129)
April 21, 2088 (Saros 130)	April 2, 2117 (Saros 131)	March 12, 2146 (Saros 132)
February 21, 2175 (Saros 133)		
