= Solar eclipse of February 4, 1943 =

Total eclipse

- Total eclipse
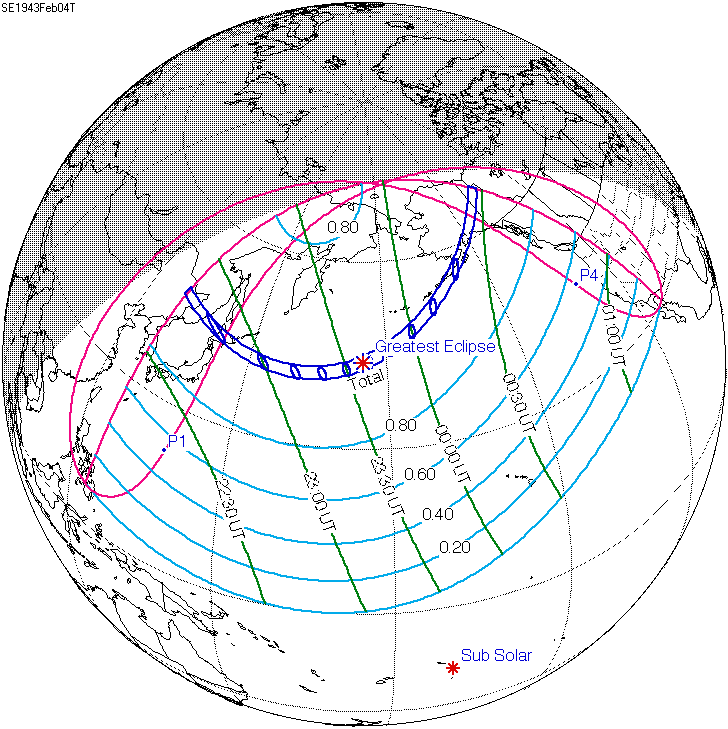
- Map
- Gamma: 0.8734
- Magnitude: 1.0331

Maximum eclipse
- Duration: 159 s (2 min 39 s)
- Coordinates: 43.6°N 175.1°E
- Max. width of band: 229 km (142 mi)

Times (UTC)
- Greatest eclipse: 23:38:10

References
- Saros: 120 (57 of 71)
- Catalog # (SE5000): 9382

A total solar eclipse occurred at the Moon's descending node of orbit between Thursday, February 4 and Friday, February 5, 1943, with a magnitude of 1.0331. A solar eclipse occurs when the Moon passes between Earth and the Sun, thereby totally or partly obscuring the image of the Sun for a viewer on Earth. A total solar eclipse occurs when the Moon's apparent diameter is larger than the Sun's, blocking all direct sunlight, turning day into darkness. Totality occurs in a narrow path across Earth's surface, with the partial solar eclipse visible over a surrounding region thousands of kilometres wide. Occurring about 22 hours after perigee (on February 4, 1943, at 1:30 UTC), the Moon's apparent diameter was larger.

It began on the morning on February 5 (Friday) over northeastern China (then occupied by Manchukuo), Primorsky Krai in the Soviet Union (now Russia), Hokkaido and southern Kunashir Island in Japan (Kunashir now belonging to Russia) and ended at sunset on February 4 (Thursday) over Alaska and Yukon in Canada. A partial eclipse was visible for parts of East Asia, Hawaii, and western North America.

== Observations ==
In China, the eclipse occurred on February 5, the exact date of the Lunar New Year. However it was during the Second Sino-Japanese War and all the areas within the path of totality which is now in China were then under the control of Manchukuo, a Japanese puppet state. Chinese scientists did not make any observation for scientific purposes. A short report with the title "Tokyo total solar eclipse" was published in Kuomintang's official newspaper Central Daily News. Actually, Tokyo was out of the path of totality and only a partial eclipse was visible.

The Japanese headquarters of the International Latitude Observatory, the predecessor of the Mizusawa VLBI Observatory of the National Astronomical Observatory of Japan in Mizusawa, Iwate (now part of the city of Ōshū) sent an observation team to Kushiro, Hokkaido. Seiichi Oikawa, a member of the team, took photos of the total eclipse. In Kushiro the weather conditions were good and the solar eclipse began at 6:46 am, 11 minutes after sunrise. About 1 hour and 5 minutes later, the sun was completely covered by the moon and the totality phase was seen for less than 2 minutes.

In the Territory of Alaska (now the state of Alaska), a total eclipse was visible from cities including Seward, Valdez and Kodiac. Alaska's largest city, Anchorage was located near the northern edge of the path of totality. A total eclipse was visible in the southeastern part of the city. The University of Alaska held a conference on February 4, the exact day of the eclipse, to explain in-depth information on the eclipse.

== Eclipse details ==
Shown below are two tables displaying details about this particular solar eclipse. The first table outlines times at which the Moon's penumbra or umbra attains the specific parameter, and the second table describes various other parameters pertaining to this eclipse.

February 4, 1943 Solar Eclipse Times
Event	Time (UTC)
First Penumbral External Contact	1943 February 4 at 21:26:44.5 UTC
First Umbral External Contact	1943 February 4 at 22:46:38.7 UTC
First Central Line	1943 February 4 at 22:48:02.2 UTC
First Umbral Internal Contact	1943 February 4 at 22:49:27.4 UTC
Ecliptic Conjunction	1943 February 4 at 23:29:20.2 UTC
Greatest Duration	1943 February 4 at 23:37:07.6 UTC
Greatest Eclipse	1943 February 4 at 23:38:10.3 UTC
Equatorial Conjunction	1943 February 4 at 23:56:42.1 UTC
Last Umbral Internal Contact	1943 February 5 at 00:26:41.1 UTC
Last Central Line	1943 February 5 at 00:28:05.3 UTC
Last Umbral External Contact	1943 February 5 at 00:29:27.7 UTC
Last Penumbral External Contact	1943 February 5 at 01:49:29.8 UTC

February 4, 1943 Solar Eclipse Parameters
Parameter	Value
Eclipse Magnitude	1.03313
Eclipse Obscuration	1.06736
Gamma	0.87335
Sun Right Ascension	21h11m02.0s
Sun Declination	-16°15'11.5"
Sun Semi-Diameter	16'13.3"
Sun Equatorial Horizontal Parallax	08.9"
Moon Right Ascension	21h10m17.8s
Moon Declination	-15°23'06.3"
Moon Semi-Diameter	16'37.6"
Moon Equatorial Horizontal Parallax	1°01'01.1"
ΔT	25.7 s

== Eclipse season ==
This eclipse is part of an eclipse season, a period, roughly every six months, when eclipses occur. Only two (or occasionally three) eclipse seasons occur each year, and each season lasts about 35 days and repeats just short of six months (173 days) later; thus two full eclipse seasons always occur each year. Either two or three eclipses happen each eclipse season. In the sequence below, each eclipse is separated by a fortnight.

Eclipse season of February 1943
February 4 Descending node (new moon)	February 20 Ascending node (full moon)
Total solar eclipse Solar Saros 120	Partial lunar eclipse Lunar Saros 132

== Related eclipses ==
=== Eclipses in 1943 ===
- A total solar eclipse on February 4.
- A partial lunar eclipse on February 20.
- An annular solar eclipse on August 1.
- A partial lunar eclipse on August 15.

=== Metonic ===
- Preceded by: Solar eclipse of April 19, 1939
- Followed by: Solar eclipse of November 23, 1946

=== Tzolkinex ===
- Preceded by: Solar eclipse of December 25, 1935
- Followed by: Solar eclipse of March 18, 1950

=== Half-Saros ===
- Preceded by: Lunar eclipse of January 30, 1934
- Followed by: Lunar eclipse of February 11, 1952

=== Tritos ===
- Preceded by: Solar eclipse of March 7, 1932
- Followed by: Solar eclipse of January 5, 1954

=== Solar Saros 120 ===
- Preceded by: Solar eclipse of January 24, 1925
- Followed by: Solar eclipse of February 15, 1961

=== Inex ===
- Preceded by: Solar eclipse of February 25, 1914
- Followed by: Solar eclipse of January 16, 1972

=== Triad ===
- Preceded by: Solar eclipse of April 5, 1856
- Followed by: Solar eclipse of December 5, 2029

=== Solar eclipses of 1942–1946 ===
This eclipse is a member of a semester series. An eclipse in a semester series of solar eclipses repeats approximately every 177 days and 4 hours (a semester) at alternating nodes of the Moon's orbit.

The partial solar eclipses on March 16, 1942 and September 10, 1942 occur in the previous lunar year eclipse set, and the partial solar eclipses on May 30, 1946 and November 23, 1946 occur in the next lunar year eclipse set.

Solar eclipse series sets from 1942 to 1946
Ascending node			Descending node		
Saros	Map	Gamma	Saros	Map	Gamma
115	August 12, 1942 Partial	−1.5244	120	February 4, 1943 Total	0.8734
125	August 1, 1943 Annular	−0.8041	130	January 25, 1944 Total	0.2025
135	July 20, 1944 Annular	−0.0314	140	January 14, 1945 Annular	−0.4937
145	July 9, 1945 Total	0.7356	150	January 3, 1946 Partial	−1.2392
155	June 29, 1946 Partial	1.4361			

=== Saros 120 ===
This eclipse is a part of Saros series 120, repeating every 18 years, 11 days, and containing 71 events. The series started with a partial solar eclipse on May 27, 933 AD. It contains annular eclipses from August 11, 1059 through April 26, 1492; hybrid eclipses from May 8, 1510 through June 8, 1564; and total eclipses from June 20, 1582 through March 30, 2033. The series ends at member 71 as a partial eclipse on July 7, 2195. Its eclipses are tabulated in three columns; every third eclipse in the same column is one exeligmos apart, so they all cast shadows over approximately the same parts of the Earth.

The longest duration of annularity was produced by member 11 at 6 minutes, 24 seconds on September 11, 1113, and the longest duration of totality was produced by member 60 at 2 minutes, 50 seconds on March 9, 1997. All eclipses in this series occur at the Moon’s descending node of orbit.

Series members 50–71 occur between 1801 and 2195:
50	51	52
November 19, 1816	November 30, 1834	December 11, 1852
53	54	55
December 22, 1870	January 1, 1889	January 14, 1907
56	57	58
January 24, 1925	February 4, 1943	February 15, 1961
59	60	61
February 26, 1979	March 9, 1997	March 20, 2015
62	63	64
March 30, 2033	April 11, 2051	April 21, 2069
65	66	67
May 2, 2087	May 14, 2105	May 25, 2123
68	69	70
June 4, 2141	June 16, 2159	June 26, 2177
71
July 7, 2195

=== Metonic series ===
The metonic series repeats eclipses every 19 years (6939.69 days), lasting about 5 cycles. Eclipses occur in nearly the same calendar date. In addition, the octon subseries repeats 1/5 of that or every 3.8 years (1387.94 days). All eclipses in this table occur at the Moon's descending node.

22 eclipse events between September 12, 1931 and July 1, 2011
September 11–12	June 30–July 1	April 17–19	February 4–5	November 22–23
114	116	118	120	122
September 12, 1931	June 30, 1935	April 19, 1939	February 4, 1943	November 23, 1946
124	126	128	130	132
September 12, 1950	June 30, 1954	April 19, 1958	February 5, 1962	November 23, 1965
134	136	138	140	142
September 11, 1969	June 30, 1973	April 18, 1977	February 4, 1981	November 22, 1984
144	146	148	150	152
September 11, 1988	June 30, 1992	April 17, 1996	February 5, 2000	November 23, 2003
154	156			
September 11, 2007	July 1, 2011			

=== Tritos series ===
This eclipse is a part of a tritos cycle, repeating at alternating nodes every 135 synodic months (≈ 3986.63 days, or 11 years minus 1 month). Their appearance and longitude are irregular due to a lack of synchronization with the anomalistic month (period of perigee), but groupings of 3 tritos cycles (≈ 33 years minus 3 months) come close (≈ 434.044 anomalistic months), so eclipses are similar in these groupings.

Series members between 1801 and 2200
March 14, 1801 (Saros 107)	February 12, 1812 (Saros 108)	January 12, 1823 (Saros 109)		November 10, 1844 (Saros 111)
		August 9, 1877 (Saros 114)	July 9, 1888 (Saros 115)	June 8, 1899 (Saros 116)
May 9, 1910 (Saros 117)	April 8, 1921 (Saros 118)	March 7, 1932 (Saros 119)	February 4, 1943 (Saros 120)	January 5, 1954 (Saros 121)
December 4, 1964 (Saros 122)	November 3, 1975 (Saros 123)	October 3, 1986 (Saros 124)	September 2, 1997 (Saros 125)	August 1, 2008 (Saros 126)
July 2, 2019 (Saros 127)	June 1, 2030 (Saros 128)	April 30, 2041 (Saros 129)	March 30, 2052 (Saros 130)	February 28, 2063 (Saros 131)
January 27, 2074 (Saros 132)	December 27, 2084 (Saros 133)	November 27, 2095 (Saros 134)	October 26, 2106 (Saros 135)	September 26, 2117 (Saros 136)
August 25, 2128 (Saros 137)	July 25, 2139 (Saros 138)	June 25, 2150 (Saros 139)	May 25, 2161 (Saros 140)	April 23, 2172 (Saros 141)
March 23, 2183 (Saros 142)	February 21, 2194 (Saros 143)			

=== Inex series ===
This eclipse is a part of the long period inex cycle, repeating at alternating nodes, every 358 synodic months (≈ 10,571.95 days, or 29 years minus 20 days). Their appearance and longitude are irregular due to a lack of synchronization with the anomalistic month (period of perigee). However, groupings of 3 inex cycles (≈ 87 years minus 2 months) comes close (≈ 1,151.02 anomalistic months), so eclipses are similar in these groupings.

Series members between 1801 and 2200
April 26, 1827 (Saros 116)	April 5, 1856 (Saros 117)	March 16, 1885 (Saros 118)
February 25, 1914 (Saros 119)	February 4, 1943 (Saros 120)	January 16, 1972 (Saros 121)
December 25, 2000 (Saros 122)	December 5, 2029 (Saros 123)	November 16, 2058 (Saros 124)
October 26, 2087 (Saros 125)	October 6, 2116 (Saros 126)	September 16, 2145 (Saros 127)
August 27, 2174 (Saros 128)		
