= Solar eclipse of August 31, 1932 =

Total eclipse

- Total eclipse
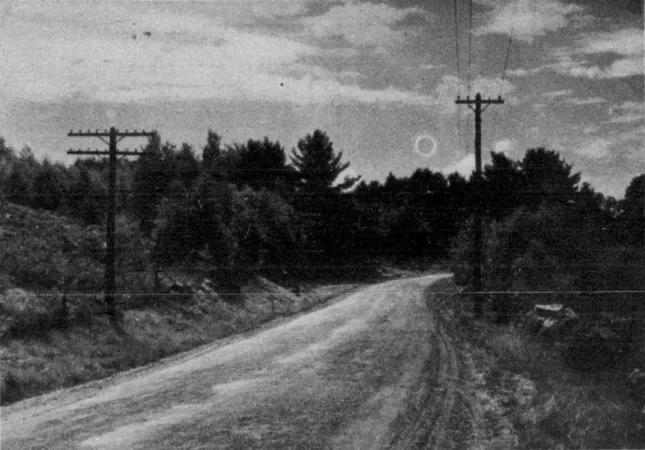
- The total solar eclipse over a country road in Maine

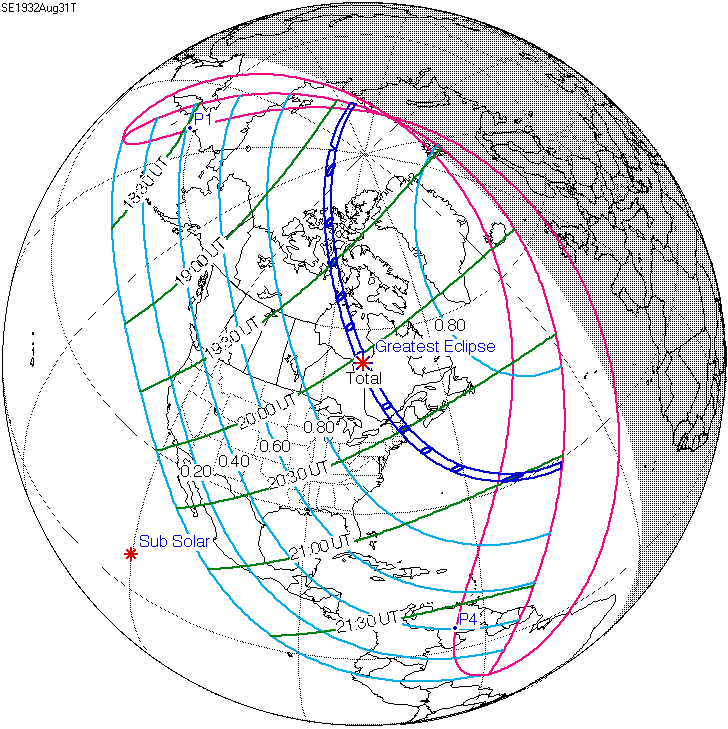
- Map
- Gamma: 0.8307
- Magnitude: 1.0257

Maximum eclipse
- Duration: 105 s (1 min 45 s)
- Coordinates: 54.5°N 79.5°W
- Max. width of band: 155 km (96 mi)

Times (UTC)
- Greatest eclipse: 20:03:41

References
- Saros: 124 (50 of 73)
- Catalog # (SE5000): 9357

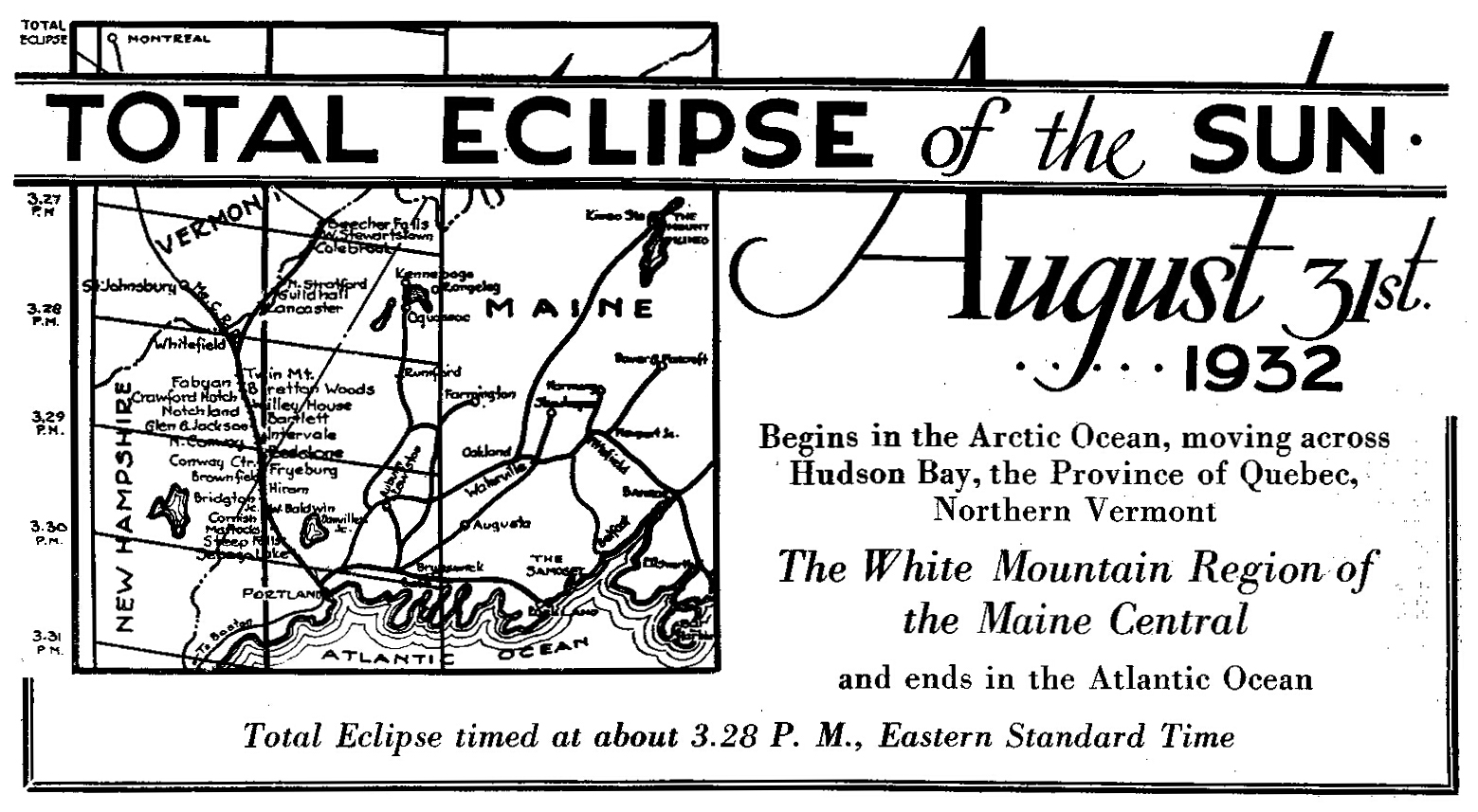
A notice on the eclipse by the Maine Central Railroad Company

A total solar eclipse occurred at the Moon's descending node of orbit between Wednesday, August 31 and Thursday, September 1, 1932, with a magnitude of 1.0257. A solar eclipse occurs when the Moon passes between Earth and the Sun, thereby totally or partly obscuring the image of the Sun for a viewer on Earth. A total solar eclipse occurs when the Moon's apparent diameter is larger than the Sun's, blocking all direct sunlight, turning day into darkness. Totality occurs in a narrow path across Earth's surface, with the partial solar eclipse visible over a surrounding region thousands of kilometres wide. Occurring about 3 days before perigee (on September 3, 1932, at 19:40 UTC), the Moon's apparent diameter was smaller.

Totality was visible from Northwest Territories (today's Northwest Territories and Nunavut) and Quebec in Canada, and northeastern Vermont, New Hampshire, southwestern Maine, the northeastern tip of Massachusetts, and northeastern Cape Cod in the United States. A partial eclipse was visible for parts of the eastern Soviet Union (on September 1 local time), North America, Central America, the Caribbean, and northern South America.

== Observations ==
Members of the Royal Astronomical Society of Canada made observations in Maskinongé, Magog, Acton Vale, Sorel-Tracy and Louisville in Quebec. The sky in Quebec was covered in clouds on the morning of August 31. In the afternoon, the clouds gradually dispersed, and observations of totality were successful. In the northeastern United States, scientists also studied the reactions of animals during the eclipse.

== Eclipse details ==
Shown below are two tables displaying details about this particular solar eclipse. The first table outlines times at which the Moon's penumbra or umbra attains the specific parameter, and the second table describes various other parameters pertaining to this eclipse.

August 31, 1932 Solar Eclipse Times
Event	Time (UTC)
First Penumbral External Contact	1932 August 31 at 17:44:58.8 UTC
First Umbral External Contact	1932 August 31 at 19:03:55.7 UTC
First Central Line	1932 August 31 at 19:04:44.4 UTC
First Umbral Internal Contact	1932 August 31 at 19:05:33.5 UTC
Equatorial Conjunction	1932 August 31 at 19:17:18.7 UTC
Ecliptic Conjunction	1932 August 31 at 19:54:55.5 UTC
Greatest Eclipse	1932 August 31 at 20:03:41.1 UTC
Greatest Duration	1932 August 31 at 20:04:47.8 UTC
Last Umbral Internal Contact	1932 August 31 at 21:02:15.0 UTC
Last Central Line	1932 August 31 at 21:03:06.5 UTC
Last Umbral External Contact	1932 August 31 at 21:03:57.4 UTC
Last Penumbral External Contact	1932 August 31 at 22:22:37.3 UTC

August 31, 1932 Solar Eclipse Parameters
Parameter	Value
Eclipse Magnitude	1.02572
Eclipse Obscuration	1.05209
Gamma	0.83068
Sun Right Ascension	10h39m17.5s
Sun Declination	+08°30'34.8"
Sun Semi-Diameter	15'51.0"
Sun Equatorial Horizontal Parallax	08.7"
Moon Right Ascension	10h40m49.4s
Moon Declination	+09°14'00.7"
Moon Semi-Diameter	16'06.8"
Moon Equatorial Horizontal Parallax	0°59'08.4"
ΔT	23.9 s

== Eclipse season ==
This eclipse is part of an eclipse season, a period, roughly every six months, when eclipses occur. Only two (or occasionally three) eclipse seasons occur each year, and each season lasts about 35 days and repeats just short of six months (173 days) later; thus two full eclipse seasons always occur each year. Either two or three eclipses happen each eclipse season. In the sequence below, each eclipse is separated by a fortnight.

Eclipse season of August–September 1932
August 31 Descending node (new moon)	September 14 Ascending node (full moon)
Total solar eclipse Solar Saros 124	Partial lunar eclipse Lunar Saros 136

== Related eclipses ==
=== Eclipses in 1932 ===
- An annular solar eclipse on March 7.
- A partial lunar eclipse on March 22.
- A total solar eclipse on August 31.
- A partial lunar eclipse on September 14.

=== Metonic ===
- Preceded by: Solar eclipse of November 12, 1928
- Followed by: Solar eclipse of June 19, 1936

=== Tzolkinex ===
- Preceded by: Solar eclipse of July 20, 1925
- Followed by: Solar eclipse of October 12, 1939

=== Half-Saros ===
- Preceded by: Lunar eclipse of August 26, 1923
- Followed by: Lunar eclipse of September 5, 1941

=== Tritos ===
- Preceded by: Solar eclipse of October 1, 1921
- Followed by: Solar eclipse of August 1, 1943

=== Solar Saros 124 ===
- Preceded by: Solar eclipse of August 21, 1914
- Followed by: Solar eclipse of September 12, 1950

=== Inex ===
- Preceded by: Solar eclipse of September 21, 1903
- Followed by: Solar eclipse of August 11, 1961

=== Triad ===
- Preceded by: Solar eclipse of October 30, 1845
- Followed by: Solar eclipse of July 2, 2019

=== Solar eclipses of 1931–1935 ===
This eclipse is a member of a semester series. An eclipse in a semester series of solar eclipses repeats approximately every 177 days and 4 hours (a semester) at alternating nodes of the Moon's orbit.

The partial solar eclipses on April 18, 1931 and October 11, 1931 occur in the previous lunar year eclipse set, and the solar eclipses on January 5, 1935 (partial), June 30, 1935 (partial), and December 25, 1935 (annular) occur in the next lunar year eclipse set.

Solar eclipse series sets from 1931 to 1935
Descending node			Ascending node		
Saros	Map	Gamma	Saros	Map	Gamma
114	September 12, 1931 Partial	1.506	119	March 7, 1932 Annular	−0.9673
124	August 31, 1932 Total	0.8307	129	February 24, 1933 Annular	−0.2191
134	August 21, 1933 Annular	0.0869	139	February 14, 1934 Total	0.4868
144	August 10, 1934 Annular	−0.689	149	February 3, 1935 Partial	1.1438
154	July 30, 1935 Partial	−1.4259			

=== Saros 124 ===
This eclipse is a part of Saros series 124, repeating every 18 years, 11 days, and containing 73 events. The series started with a partial solar eclipse on March 6, 1049. It contains total eclipses from June 12, 1211 through September 22, 1968, and a hybrid eclipse on October 3, 1986. There are no annular eclipses in this set. The series ends at member 73 as a partial eclipse on May 11, 2347. Its eclipses are tabulated in three columns; every third eclipse in the same column is one exeligmos apart, so they all cast shadows over approximately the same parts of the Earth.

The longest duration of totality was produced by member 39 at 5 minutes, 46 seconds on May 3, 1734. All eclipses in this series occur at the Moon’s descending node of orbit.

Series members 43–64 occur between 1801 and 2200:
43	44	45
June 16, 1806	June 26, 1824	July 8, 1842
46	47	48
July 18, 1860	July 29, 1878	August 9, 1896
49	50	51
August 21, 1914	August 31, 1932	September 12, 1950
52	53	54
September 22, 1968	October 3, 1986	October 14, 2004
55	56	57
October 25, 2022	November 4, 2040	November 16, 2058
58	59	60
November 26, 2076	December 7, 2094	December 19, 2112
61	62	63
December 30, 2130	January 9, 2149	January 21, 2167
64
January 31, 2185

=== Metonic series ===
The metonic series repeats eclipses every 19 years (6939.69 days), lasting about 5 cycles. Eclipses occur in nearly the same calendar date. In addition, the octon subseries repeats 1/5 of that or every 3.8 years (1387.94 days). All eclipses in this table occur at the Moon's descending node.

22 eclipse events between April 8, 1902 and August 31, 1989
April 7–8	January 24–25	November 12	August 31–September 1	June 19–20
108	110	112	114	116
April 8, 1902			August 31, 1913	June 19, 1917
118	120	122	124	126
April 8, 1921	January 24, 1925	November 12, 1928	August 31, 1932	June 19, 1936
128	130	132	134	136
April 7, 1940	January 25, 1944	November 12, 1947	September 1, 1951	June 20, 1955
138	140	142	144	146
April 8, 1959	January 25, 1963	November 12, 1966	August 31, 1970	June 20, 1974
148	150	152	154	
April 7, 1978	January 25, 1982	November 12, 1985	August 31, 1989	

=== Tritos series ===
This eclipse is a part of a tritos cycle, repeating at alternating nodes every 135 synodic months (≈ 3986.63 days, or 11 years minus 1 month). Their appearance and longitude are irregular due to a lack of synchronization with the anomalistic month (period of perigee), but groupings of 3 tritos cycles (≈ 33 years minus 3 months) come close (≈ 434.044 anomalistic months), so eclipses are similar in these groupings.

Series members between 1801 and 2200
September 8, 1801 (Saros 112)	August 7, 1812 (Saros 113)	July 8, 1823 (Saros 114)	June 7, 1834 (Saros 115)	May 6, 1845 (Saros 116)
April 5, 1856 (Saros 117)	March 6, 1867 (Saros 118)	February 2, 1878 (Saros 119)	January 1, 1889 (Saros 120)	December 3, 1899 (Saros 121)
November 2, 1910 (Saros 122)	October 1, 1921 (Saros 123)	August 31, 1932 (Saros 124)	August 1, 1943 (Saros 125)	June 30, 1954 (Saros 126)
May 30, 1965 (Saros 127)	April 29, 1976 (Saros 128)	March 29, 1987 (Saros 129)	February 26, 1998 (Saros 130)	January 26, 2009 (Saros 131)
December 26, 2019 (Saros 132)	November 25, 2030 (Saros 133)	October 25, 2041 (Saros 134)	September 22, 2052 (Saros 135)	August 24, 2063 (Saros 136)
July 24, 2074 (Saros 137)	June 22, 2085 (Saros 138)	May 22, 2096 (Saros 139)	April 23, 2107 (Saros 140)	March 22, 2118 (Saros 141)
February 18, 2129 (Saros 142)	January 20, 2140 (Saros 143)	December 19, 2150 (Saros 144)	November 17, 2161 (Saros 145)	October 17, 2172 (Saros 146)
September 16, 2183 (Saros 147)	August 16, 2194 (Saros 148)			

=== Inex series ===
This eclipse is a part of the long period inex cycle, repeating at alternating nodes, every 358 synodic months (≈ 10,571.95 days, or 29 years minus 20 days). Their appearance and longitude are irregular due to a lack of synchronization with the anomalistic month (period of perigee). However, groupings of 3 inex cycles (≈ 87 years minus 2 months) comes close (≈ 1,151.02 anomalistic months), so eclipses are similar in these groupings.

Series members between 1801 and 2200
November 19, 1816 (Saros 120)	October 30, 1845 (Saros 121)	October 10, 1874 (Saros 122)
September 21, 1903 (Saros 123)	August 31, 1932 (Saros 124)	August 11, 1961 (Saros 125)
July 22, 1990 (Saros 126)	July 2, 2019 (Saros 127)	June 11, 2048 (Saros 128)
May 22, 2077 (Saros 129)	May 3, 2106 (Saros 130)	April 13, 2135 (Saros 131)
March 23, 2164 (Saros 132)	March 3, 2193 (Saros 133)	
