= Solar eclipse of February 15, 1961 =

Total solar eclipse

- Total eclipse
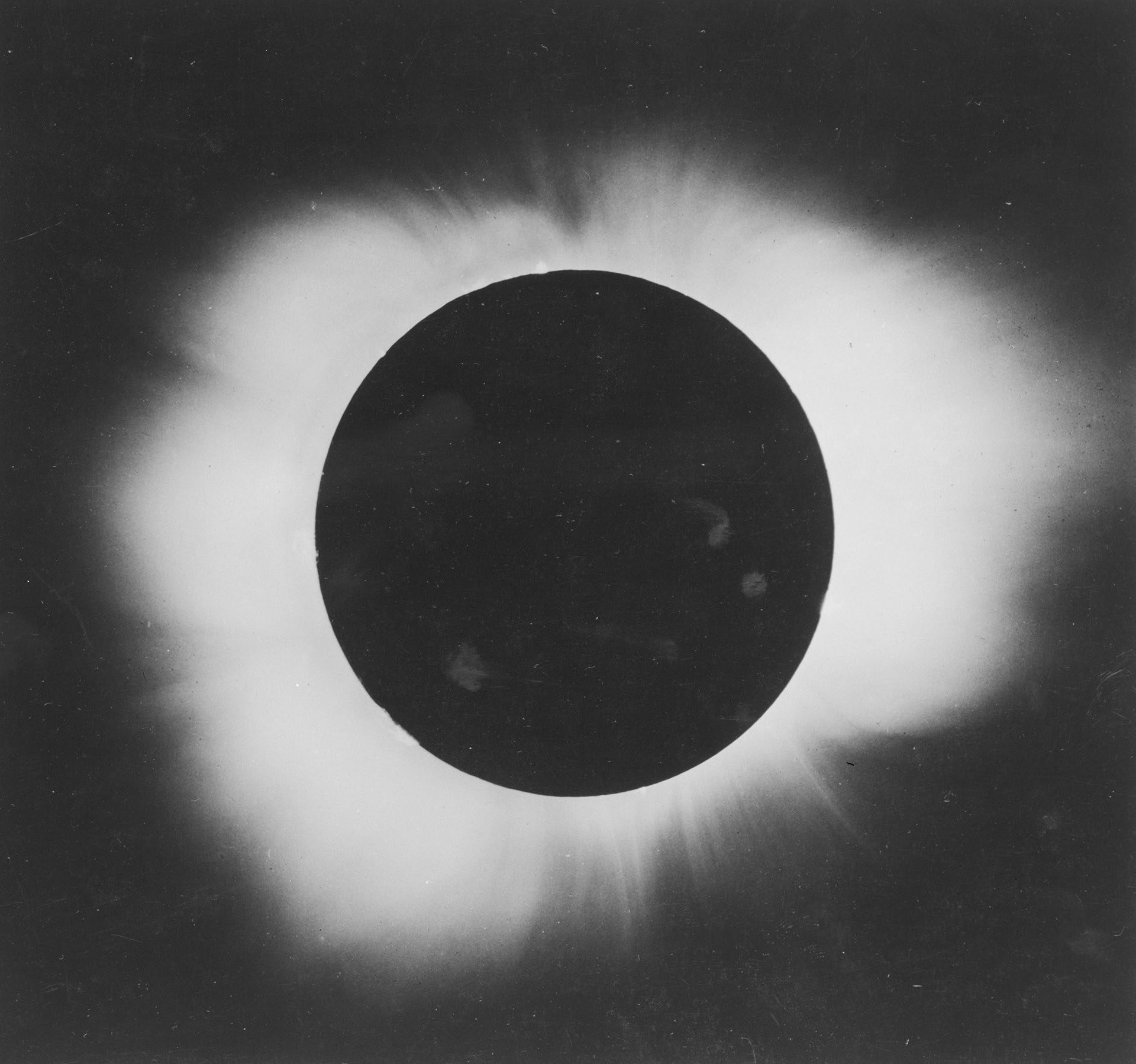
- Totality of eclipse

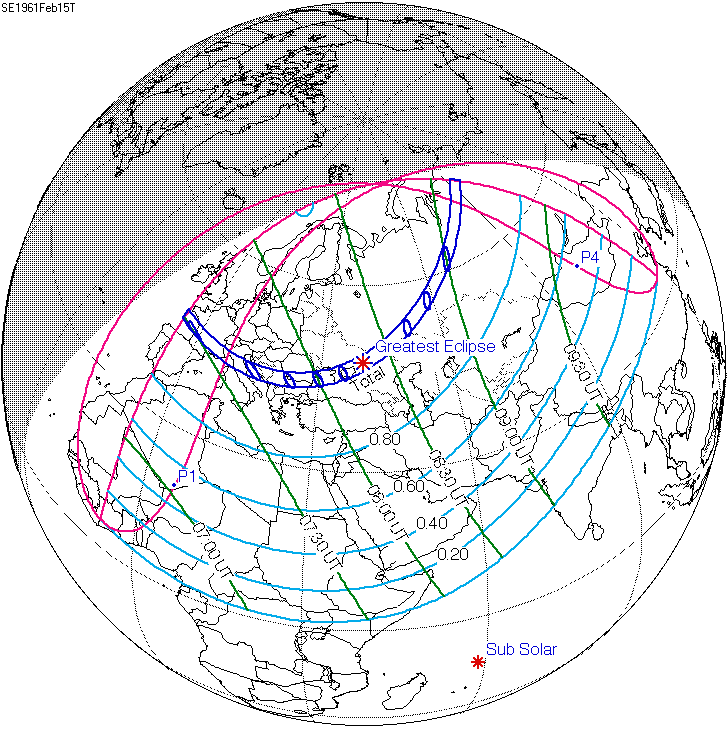
- Map
- Gamma: 0.883
- Magnitude: 1.036

Maximum eclipse
- Duration: 165 s (2 min 45 s)
- Coordinates: 47.4°N 40°E
- Max. width of band: 258 km (160 mi)

Times (UTC)
- Greatest eclipse: 8:19:48

References
- Saros: 120 (58 of 71)
- Catalog # (SE5000): 9422

A total solar eclipse occurred at the Moon's descending node of orbit on Wednesday, February 15, 1961, with a magnitude of 1.036. A solar eclipse occurs when the Moon passes between Earth and the Sun, thereby totally or partly obscuring the image of the Sun for a viewer on Earth. A total solar eclipse occurs when the Moon's apparent diameter is larger than the Sun's, blocking all direct sunlight, turning day into darkness. Totality occurs in a narrow path across Earth's surface, with the partial solar eclipse visible over a surrounding region thousands of kilometres wide. Occurring about 21 hours after perigee (on February 14, 1961, at 11:30 UTC), the Moon's apparent diameter was larger.

Totality was visible from France, Monaco, Italy, San Marino, Federal People's Republic of Yugoslavia (parts now belonging to Croatia, Bosnia and Herzegovina, Montenegro, Serbia and Kosovo, North Macedonia), Albania, Bulgaria including the capital city Sofia, Romania including the capital city Bucharest, and the Soviet Union (parts now belonging to Ukraine, Russia and Kazakhstan). The maximum eclipse was recorded near Novocherkassk (Russian SFSR). A partial eclipse was visible for parts of Europe, North Africa, Northeast Africa, West Asia, Central Asia, and South Asia.

The date of this eclipse was the exact date of the Lunar New Year, celebrated in parts of Asia where a partial solar eclipse was visible.

== Observation ==
A team from the University of Texas observed the total eclipse in Pisa, Italy, mostly studying the solar irradiance with a wavelength below 1 centimeter. At that time, coronagraphs had already allowed coronal observation in the visible light band so it could be observed at any time, not just during total solar eclipses, but instruments allowing millimeter-wave band observations were still lacking. Therefore, it was still necessary to make such observations during a total solar eclipse. Arcetri Observatory in Florence, Italy also made observations.

== In popular culture ==
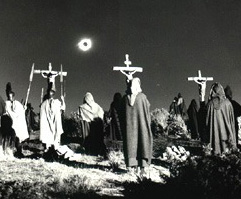
The scene for the film Barabbas (1961) in which the eclipse was used to recreate the crucifixion darkness

The crucifixion scene in the 1961 film Barabbas was shot during this eclipse.

== Eclipse details ==
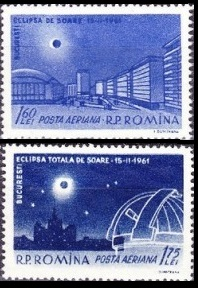
Stamps of Romania issued on the occasion of this total solar eclipse

Shown below are two tables displaying details about this particular solar eclipse. The first table outlines times at which the Moon's penumbra or umbra attains the specific parameter, and the second table describes various other parameters pertaining to this eclipse.

February 15, 1961 Solar Eclipse Times
Event	Time (UTC)
First Penumbral External Contact	1961 February 15 at 06:09:22.0 UTC
First Umbral External Contact	1961 February 15 at 07:29:58.3 UTC
First Central Line	1961 February 15 at 07:31:35.6 UTC
First Umbral Internal Contact	1961 February 15 at 07:33:15.5 UTC
Ecliptic Conjunction	1961 February 15 at 08:10:53.4 UTC
Greatest Duration	1961 February 15 at 08:18:50.8 UTC
Greatest Eclipse	1961 February 15 at 08:19:48.3 UTC
Equatorial Conjunction	1961 February 15 at 08:43:06.4 UTC
Last Umbral Internal Contact	1961 February 15 at 09:06:05.1 UTC
Last Central Line	1961 February 15 at 09:07:44.1 UTC
Last Umbral External Contact	1961 February 15 at 09:09:20.5 UTC
Last Penumbral External Contact	1961 February 15 at 10:30:05.6 UTC

February 15, 1961 Solar Eclipse Parameters
Parameter	Value
Eclipse Magnitude	1.03604
Eclipse Obscuration	1.07339
Gamma	0.88302
Sun Right Ascension	21h54m38.6s
Sun Declination	-12°42'31.9"
Sun Semi-Diameter	16'11.4"
Sun Equatorial Horizontal Parallax	08.9"
Moon Right Ascension	21h53m44.3s
Moon Declination	-11°50'22.7"
Moon Semi-Diameter	16'38.8"
Moon Equatorial Horizontal Parallax	1°01'05.5"
ΔT	33.6 s

== Eclipse season ==
This eclipse is part of an eclipse season, a period, roughly every six months, when eclipses occur. Only two (or occasionally three) eclipse seasons occur each year, and each season lasts about 35 days and repeats just short of six months (173 days) later; thus two full eclipse seasons always occur each year. Either two or three eclipses happen each eclipse season. In the sequence below, each eclipse is separated by a fortnight.

Eclipse season of February–March 1961
February 15 Descending node (new moon)	March 2 Ascending node (full moon)
Total solar eclipse Solar Saros 120	Partial lunar eclipse Lunar Saros 132

== Related eclipses ==
=== Eclipses in 1961 ===
- A total solar eclipse on February 15.
- A partial lunar eclipse on March 2.
- An annular solar eclipse on August 11.
- A partial lunar eclipse on August 26.

=== Metonic ===
- Preceded by: Solar eclipse of April 30, 1957
- Followed by: Solar eclipse of December 4, 1964

=== Tzolkinex ===
- Preceded by: Solar eclipse of January 5, 1954
- Followed by: Solar eclipse of March 28, 1968

=== Half-Saros ===
- Preceded by: Lunar eclipse of February 11, 1952
- Followed by: Lunar eclipse of February 21, 1970

=== Tritos ===
- Preceded by: Solar eclipse of March 18, 1950
- Followed by: Solar eclipse of January 16, 1972

=== Solar Saros 120 ===
- Preceded by: Solar eclipse of February 4, 1943
- Followed by: Solar eclipse of February 26, 1979

=== Inex ===
- Preceded by: Solar eclipse of March 7, 1932
- Followed by: Solar eclipse of January 26, 1990

=== Triad ===
- Preceded by: Solar eclipse of April 16, 1874
- Followed by: Solar eclipse of December 16, 2047

=== Solar eclipses of 1961–1964 ===
This eclipse is a member of a semester series. An eclipse in a semester series of solar eclipses repeats approximately every 177 days and 4 hours (a semester) at alternating nodes of the Moon's orbit.

The partial solar eclipses on June 10, 1964 and December 4, 1964 occur in the next lunar year eclipse set.

Solar eclipse series sets from 1961 to 1964
Descending node			Ascending node		
Saros	Map	Gamma	Saros	Map	Gamma
120	February 15, 1961 Total	0.883	125	August 11, 1961 Annular	−0.8859
130	February 5, 1962 Total	0.2107	135	July 31, 1962 Annular	−0.113
140	January 25, 1963 Annular	−0.4898	145	July 20, 1963 Total	0.6571
150	January 14, 1964 Partial	−1.2354	155	July 9, 1964 Partial	1.3623

=== Saros 120 ===
This eclipse is a part of Saros series 120, repeating every 18 years, 11 days, and containing 71 events. The series started with a partial solar eclipse on May 27, 933 AD. It contains annular eclipses from August 11, 1059 through April 26, 1492; hybrid eclipses from May 8, 1510 through June 8, 1564; and total eclipses from June 20, 1582 through March 30, 2033. The series ends at member 71 as a partial eclipse on July 7, 2195. Its eclipses are tabulated in three columns; every third eclipse in the same column is one exeligmos apart, so they all cast shadows over approximately the same parts of the Earth.

The longest duration of annularity was produced by member 11 at 6 minutes, 24 seconds on September 11, 1113, and the longest duration of totality was produced by member 60 at 2 minutes, 50 seconds on March 9, 1997. All eclipses in this series occur at the Moon’s descending node of orbit.

Series members 50–71 occur between 1801 and 2195:
50	51	52
November 19, 1816	November 30, 1834	December 11, 1852
53	54	55
December 22, 1870	January 1, 1889	January 14, 1907
56	57	58
January 24, 1925	February 4, 1943	February 15, 1961
59	60	61
February 26, 1979	March 9, 1997	March 20, 2015
62	63	64
March 30, 2033	April 11, 2051	April 21, 2069
65	66	67
May 2, 2087	May 14, 2105	May 25, 2123
68	69	70
June 4, 2141	June 16, 2159	June 26, 2177
71
July 7, 2195

=== Metonic series ===
The metonic series repeats eclipses every 19 years (6939.69 days), lasting about 5 cycles. Eclipses occur in nearly the same calendar date. In addition, the octon subseries repeats 1/5 of that or every 3.8 years (1387.94 days). All eclipses in this table occur at the Moon's descending node.

21 eclipse events between July 11, 1953 and July 11, 2029
July 10–11	April 29–30	February 15–16	December 4	September 21–23
116	118	120	122	124
July 11, 1953	April 30, 1957	February 15, 1961	December 4, 1964	September 22, 1968
126	128	130	132	134
July 10, 1972	April 29, 1976	February 16, 1980	December 4, 1983	September 23, 1987
136	138	140	142	144
July 11, 1991	April 29, 1995	February 16, 1999	December 4, 2002	September 22, 2006
146	148	150	152	154
July 11, 2010	April 29, 2014	February 15, 2018	December 4, 2021	September 21, 2025
156
July 11, 2029

=== Tritos series ===
This eclipse is a part of a tritos cycle, repeating at alternating nodes every 135 synodic months (≈ 3986.63 days, or 11 years minus 1 month). Their appearance and longitude are irregular due to a lack of synchronization with the anomalistic month (period of perigee), but groupings of 3 tritos cycles (≈ 33 years minus 3 months) come close (≈ 434.044 anomalistic months), so eclipses are similar in these groupings.

Series members between 1801 and 2200
March 25, 1819 (Saros 107)	February 23, 1830 (Saros 108)	January 22, 1841 (Saros 109)		November 21, 1862 (Saros 111)
		August 20, 1895 (Saros 114)	July 21, 1906 (Saros 115)	June 19, 1917 (Saros 116)
May 19, 1928 (Saros 117)	April 19, 1939 (Saros 118)	March 18, 1950 (Saros 119)	February 15, 1961 (Saros 120)	January 16, 1972 (Saros 121)
December 15, 1982 (Saros 122)	November 13, 1993 (Saros 123)	October 14, 2004 (Saros 124)	September 13, 2015 (Saros 125)	August 12, 2026 (Saros 126)
July 13, 2037 (Saros 127)	June 11, 2048 (Saros 128)	May 11, 2059 (Saros 129)	April 11, 2070 (Saros 130)	March 10, 2081 (Saros 131)
February 7, 2092 (Saros 132)	January 8, 2103 (Saros 133)	December 8, 2113 (Saros 134)	November 6, 2124 (Saros 135)	October 7, 2135 (Saros 136)
September 6, 2146 (Saros 137)	August 5, 2157 (Saros 138)	July 5, 2168 (Saros 139)	June 5, 2179 (Saros 140)	May 4, 2190 (Saros 141)

=== Inex series ===
This eclipse is a part of the long period inex cycle, repeating at alternating nodes, every 358 synodic months (≈ 10,571.95 days, or 29 years minus 20 days). Their appearance and longitude are irregular due to a lack of synchronization with the anomalistic month (period of perigee). However, groupings of 3 inex cycles (≈ 87 years minus 2 months) comes close (≈ 1,151.02 anomalistic months), so eclipses are similar in these groupings.

Series members between 1801 and 2200
May 27, 1816 (Saros 115)	May 6, 1845 (Saros 116)	April 16, 1874 (Saros 117)
March 29, 1903 (Saros 118)	March 7, 1932 (Saros 119)	February 15, 1961 (Saros 120)
January 26, 1990 (Saros 121)	January 6, 2019 (Saros 122)	December 16, 2047 (Saros 123)
November 26, 2076 (Saros 124)	November 6, 2105 (Saros 125)	October 17, 2134 (Saros 126)
September 28, 2163 (Saros 127)	September 6, 2192 (Saros 128)	

== See also ==
- List of solar eclipses visible from Russia
- List of solar eclipses visible from Ukraine
