= Solar eclipse of July 22, 1990 =

Total eclipse

- Total eclipse
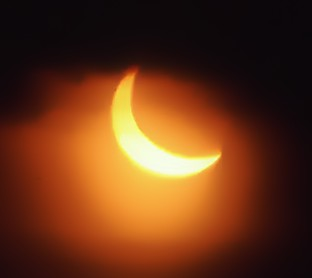
- Partial from Finland

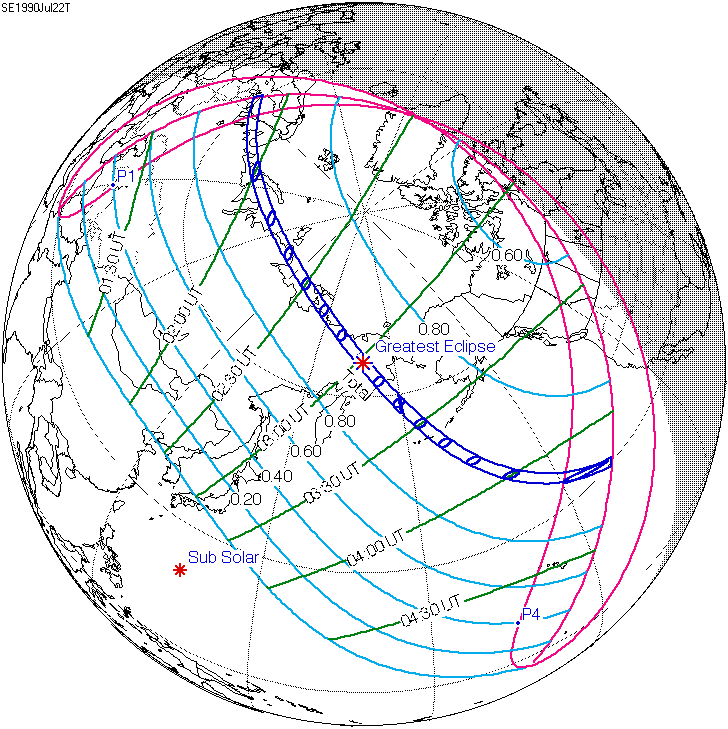
- Map
- Gamma: 0.7597
- Magnitude: 1.0391

Maximum eclipse
- Duration: 153 s (2 min 33 s)
- Coordinates: 65.2°N 168.9°E
- Max. width of band: 201 km (125 mi)

Times (UTC)
- Greatest eclipse: 3:03:07

References
- Saros: 126 (46 of 72)
- Catalog # (SE5000): 9487

A total solar eclipse occurred at the Moon's descending node of orbit between Saturday, July 21 and Sunday, July 22, 1990, with a magnitude of 1.0391. A solar eclipse occurs when the Moon passes between Earth and the Sun, thereby totally or partly obscuring the image of the Sun for a viewer on Earth. A total solar eclipse occurs when the Moon's apparent diameter is larger than the Sun's, blocking all direct sunlight, turning day into darkness. Totality occurs in a narrow path across Earth's surface, with the partial solar eclipse visible over a surrounding region thousands of kilometres wide. Occurring 2.7 days after perigee (on July 19, 1990, at 12:20 UTC), the Moon's apparent diameter was larger.

Totality was visible in southern Finland including its capital city Helsinki, the Soviet Union (including today's northern Estonia and northern Russia), and eastern Andreanof Islands and Amukta of Alaska. A partial eclipse was visible for parts of Eastern Europe, North Asia, Alaska, western Canada, the western United States, and Hawaii.

In Finland, the solar eclipse occurred during sunrise and enabled observation and photography without protective glasses, which was however hampered by strong clouds. The Sun was totally eclipsed in Helsinki began at 06:03:07 local time.

== Observations ==
The Finnish Geodetic Institute conducted a series of measurements for 52 hours to study the changes in gravity using an absolute gravimeter in Helsinki. No abnormal values were recorded. An observation team of the Academy of Sciences of the Soviet Union went to the Solovetsky Islands, Arkhangelsk Oblast in the White Sea, and planned to take images of the corona with different exposure levels and record videos. However, there were clouds at sunrise on the eclipse day, and drizzle continued until noon, so the observation was not successful.

== Eclipse timing ==
=== Places experiencing total eclipse ===
Solar Eclipse of July 22, 1990 (Local Times)
| Country or territory | City or place | Start of partial eclipse | Start of total eclipse | Maximum eclipse | End of total eclipse | End of partial eclipse | Duration of totality (min:s) | Duration of eclipse (hr:min) | Maximum magnitude |
|---|---|---|---|---|---|---|---|---|---|
| Estonia | Tallinn | 04:42:38 (sunrise) | 04:52:09 | 04:52:33 | 04:52:56 | 05:44:22 | 0:47 | 1:02 | 1.0028 |
| Finland | Kotka | 04:25:17 (sunrise) | 04:52:11 | 04:52:36 | 04:53:01 | 05:44:57 | 0:50 | 1:20 | 1.0029 |
| Finland | Lappeenranta | 04:15:00 (sunrise) | 04:52:15 | 04:52:42 | 04:53:09 | 05:45:22 | 0:54 | 1:30 | 1.0033 |
| Finland | Helsinki | 04:35:53 (sunrise) | 04:52:29 | 04:53:11 | 04:53:53 | 05:45:11 | 1:24 | 1:09 | 1.0117 |
| Finland | Vantaa | 04:34:24 (sunrise) | 04:52:34 | 04:53:16 | 04:53:58 | 05:45:18 | 1:24 | 1:11 | 1.0128 |
| Finland | Espoo | 04:36:42 (sunrise) | 04:52:38 | 04:53:21 | 04:54:04 | 05:45:19 | 1:26 | 1:09 | 1.014 |
| Finland | Lahti | 04:25:50 (sunrise) | 04:53:00 | 04:53:53:42 | 04:54:24 | 05:45:57 | 1:24 | 1:20 | 1.011 |
| Finland | Joensuu | 04:02:33 | 04:53:02 | 04:53:47 | 04:54:32 | 05:46:57 | 1:30 | 1:44 | 1.0149 |
| Finland | Riihimäki | 04:31:35 (sunrise) | 04:53:11 | 04:53:50 | 04:54:29 | 05:45:55 | 1:18 | 1:14 | 1.0086 |
| Russia | Belushya Guba | 05:05:48 | 06:01:07 | 06:01:32 | 06:01:57 | 06:59:12 | 0:50 | 1:53 | 1.0022 |
| Russia | Chersky | 13:45:28 | 14:51:05 | 14:52:20 | 14:53:35 | 15:57:31 | 2:30 | 2:12 | 1.0163 |

=== Places experiencing partial eclipse ===
Solar Eclipse of July 22, 1990 (Local Times)
| Country or territory | City or place | Start of partial eclipse | Maximum eclipse | End of partial eclipse | Duration of eclipse (hr:min) | Maximum coverage |
|---|---|---|---|---|---|---|
| Azerbaijan | Baku | 06:28:36 (sunrise) | 06:31:44 | 07:07:15 | 0:39 | 29.69% |
| Kazakhstan | Astana | 07:42:36 | 08:32:53 | 09:26:36 | 1:44 | 40.77% |
| Kazakhstan | Oral | 05:44:25 (sunrise) | 06:33:45 | 07:26:07 | 1:42 | 58.50% |
| Russia | Moscow | 05:16:14 (sunrise) | 05:43:12 | 06:35:54 | 1:20 | 82.39% |
| Ukraine | Luhansk | 04:43:50 (sunrise) | 04:47:37 | 05:25:15 | 0:41 | 53.40% |
| Estonia | Kohtla-Järve | 04:32:59 (sunrise) | 04:51:22 | 05:43:33 | 1:11 | 98.74% |
| Belarus | Vitebsk | 04:49:13 (sunrise) | 04:53:56 | 05:37:24 | 0:48 | 77.45% |
| Ukraine | Kharkiv | 04:50:22 (sunrise) | 04:54:19 | 05:28:25 | 0:38 | 51.19% |
| Latvia | Gulbene | 04:50:53 (sunrise) | 04:56:03 | 05:41:01 | 0:50 | 84.11% |
| Sweden | Sundsvall | 03:45:19 (sunrise) | 03:58:54 | 04:50:11 | 1:05 | 93.32% |
| Sweden | Umeå | 03:16:36 (sunrise) | 03:58:56 | 04:50:53 | 1:34 | 93.48% |
| Finland | Kemi | 04:07:59 | 04:59:14 | 05:52:07 | 1:44 | 93.85% |
| Finland | Rovaniemi | 04:08:09 | 04:59:41 | 05:52:52 | 1:45 | 93.55% |
| Åland Islands | Mariehamn | 04:56:29 (sunrise) | 05:02:31 | 05:46:45 | 0:50 | 84.28% |
| Sweden | Kiruna | 03:12:01 | 04:03:09 | 04:55:43 | 1:44 | 88.05% |
| Norway | Tromsø | 03:14:15 | 04:05:34 | 04:58:13 | 1:44 | 85.11% |
| Latvia | Riga | 05:02:58 (sunrise) | 05:10:55 | 05:41:42 | 0:39 | 51.21% |
| Belarus | Minsk | 05:06:51 (sunrise) | 05:11:20 | 05:36:49 | 0:30 | 38.56% |
| Sweden | Stockholm | 04:10:14 (sunrise) | 04:16:01 | 04:46:37 | 0:36 | 51.46% |
| Lithuania | Vilnius | 05:11:45 (sunrise) | 05:16:22 | 05:38:38 | 0:27 | 32.31% |
| Svalbard and Jan Mayen | Longyearbyen | 03:23:48 | 04:16:27 | 05:09:56 | 1:46 | 75.90% |
| Greenland | Danmarkshavn | 23:35:13 (Note: The time listed here for this location occurs on July 21, 1990, local time.) | 00:24:54 | 01:14:57 | 1:40 | 64.09% |
| Greenland | Pituffik (Note: The times listed for this location occur on July 21, 1990, local time.) | 21:54:24 | 22:42:48 | 23:30:52 | | 53.41% |
| United States | Anchorage | 18:26:24 | 19:23:55 | 20:18:42 | 1:52 | 70.79% |
| Canada | Calgary | 20:44:24 | 21:31:43 | 21:38:13 (sunset) | 0:54 | 56.15% |
| United States | Adak | 17:27:22 | 18:34:36 | 19:37:06 | 2:10 | 97.66% |
| United States | Unalaska | 18:31:07 | 19:34:47 | 20:34:19 | 2:03 | 93.60% |
| Canada | Vancouver | 19:49:02 | 20:38:22 | 21:06:57 (sunset) | 1:18 | 61.45% |
| United States Minor Outlying Islands | Midway Atoll | 16:17:41 | 17:18:10 | 18:13:08 | 1:55 | 50.36% |
| United States | Honolulu | 17:34:37 | 18:28:46 | 19:14:54 (sunset) | 1:40 | 62.12% |

== Eclipse details ==
Shown below are two tables displaying details about this particular solar eclipse. The first table outlines times at which the Moon's penumbra or umbra attains the specific parameter, and the second table describes various other parameters pertaining to this eclipse.

July 22, 1990 Solar Eclipse Times
| Event | Time (UTC) |
|---|---|
| First Penumbral External Contact | 1990 July 22 at 00:40:59.9 UTC |
| First Umbral External Contact | 1990 July 22 at 01:53:08.5 UTC |
| First Central Line | 1990 July 22 at 01:54:21.6 UTC |
| First Umbral Internal Contact | 1990 July 22 at 01:55:35.5 UTC |
| Equatorial Conjunction | 1990 July 22 at 02:37:42.8 UTC |
| Ecliptic Conjunction | 1990 July 22 at 02:55:15.0 UTC |
| Greatest Duration | 1990 July 22 at 03:00:36.7 UTC |
| Greatest Eclipse | 1990 July 22 at 03:03:07.3 UTC |
| Last Umbral Internal Contact | 1990 July 22 at 04:10:58.3 UTC |
| Last Central Line | 1990 July 22 at 04:12:09.7 UTC |
| Last Umbral External Contact | 1990 July 22 at 04:13:20.4 UTC |
| Last Penumbral External Contact | 1990 July 22 at 05:25:30.2 UTC |

July 22, 1990 Solar Eclipse Parameters
| Parameter | Value |
|---|---|
| Eclipse Magnitude | 1.03908 |
| Eclipse Obscuration | 1.07968 |
| Gamma | 0.75972 |
| Sun Right Ascension | 08h04m51.4s |
| Sun Declination | +20°20'48.2" |
| Sun Semi-Diameter | 15'44.5" |
| Sun Equatorial Horizontal Parallax | 08.7" |
| Moon Right Ascension | 08h05m49.3s |
| Moon Declination | +21°03'44.2" |
| Moon Semi-Diameter | 16'11.1" |
| Moon Equatorial Horizontal Parallax | 0°59'24.2" |
| ΔT | 57.2 s |

== Eclipse season ==
This eclipse is part of an eclipse season, a period, roughly every six months, when eclipses occur. Only two (or occasionally three) eclipse seasons occur each year, and each season lasts about 35 days and repeats just short of six months (173 days) later; thus two full eclipse seasons always occur each year. Either two or three eclipses happen each eclipse season. In the sequence below, each eclipse is separated by a fortnight.

Eclipse season of July–August 1990
| July 22 Descending node (new moon) | August 6 Ascending node (full moon) |
|---|---|
| Total solar eclipse Solar Saros 126 | Partial lunar eclipse Lunar Saros 138 |

== Related eclipses ==
=== Eclipses in 1990 ===
- An annular solar eclipse on January 26.
- A total lunar eclipse on February 9.
- A total solar eclipse on July 22.
- A partial lunar eclipse on August 6.

=== Metonic ===
- Preceded by: Solar eclipse of October 3, 1986
- Followed by: Solar eclipse of May 10, 1994

=== Tzolkinex ===
- Preceded by: Solar eclipse of June 11, 1983
- Followed by: Solar eclipse of September 2, 1997

=== Half-Saros ===
- Preceded by: Lunar eclipse of July 17, 1981
- Followed by: Lunar eclipse of July 28, 1999

=== Tritos ===
- Preceded by: Solar eclipse of August 22, 1979
- Followed by: Solar eclipse of June 21, 2001

=== Solar Saros 126 ===
- Preceded by: Solar eclipse of July 10, 1972
- Followed by: Solar eclipse of August 1, 2008

=== Inex ===
- Preceded by: Solar eclipse of August 11, 1961
- Followed by: Solar eclipse of July 2, 2019

=== Triad ===
- Preceded by: Solar eclipse of September 21, 1903
- Followed by: Solar eclipse of May 22, 2077

=== Solar eclipses of 1990–1992 ===
This eclipse is a member of a semester series. An eclipse in a semester series of solar eclipses repeats approximately every 177 days and 4 hours (a semester) at alternating nodes of the Moon's orbit.

Solar eclipse series sets from 1990 to 1992
| Ascending node | | | Descending node | | |
| Saros | Map | Gamma | Saros | Map | Gamma |
| 121 | January 26, 1990 Annular | −0.9457 | 126 Partial in Finland | July 22, 1990 Total | 0.7597 |
| 131 | January 15, 1991 Annular | −0.2727 | 136 Totality in Playas del Coco, Costa Rica | July 11, 1991 Total | −0.0041 |
| 141 | January 4, 1992 Annular | 0.4091 | 146 | June 30, 1992 Total | −0.7512 |
| 151 | December 24, 1992 Partial | 1.0711 | | | |

=== Saros 126 ===
This eclipse is a part of Saros series 126, repeating every 18 years, 11 days, and containing 72 events. The series started with a partial solar eclipse on March 10, 1179. It contains annular eclipses from June 4, 1323 through April 4, 1810; hybrid eclipses from April 14, 1828 through May 6, 1864; and total eclipses from May 17, 1882 through August 23, 2044. The series ends at member 72 as a partial eclipse on May 3, 2459. Its eclipses are tabulated in three columns; every third eclipse in the same column is one exeligmos apart, so they all cast shadows over approximately the same parts of the Earth.

The longest duration of annularity was produced by member 11 at 6 minutes, 30 seconds on June 26, 1359, and the longest duration of totality was produced by member 45 at 2 minutes, 36 seconds on July 10, 1972. All eclipses in this series occur at the Moon’s descending node of orbit.

Series members 36–57 occur between 1801 and 2200:
| 36 | 37 | 38 |
|---|---|---|
| April 4, 1810 | April 14, 1828 | April 25, 1846 |
| 39 | 40 | 41 |
| May 6, 1864 | May 17, 1882 | May 28, 1900 |
| 42 | 43 | 44 |
| June 8, 1918 | June 19, 1936 | June 30, 1954 |
| 45 | 46 | 47 |
| July 10, 1972 | July 22, 1990 | August 1, 2008 |
| 48 | 49 | 50 |
| August 12, 2026 | August 23, 2044 | September 3, 2062 |
| 51 | 52 | 53 |
| September 13, 2080 | September 25, 2098 | October 6, 2116 |
| 54 | 55 | 56 |
| October 17, 2134 | October 28, 2152 | November 8, 2170 |
57
November 18, 2188

=== Metonic series ===
The metonic series repeats eclipses every 19 years (6939.69 days), lasting about 5 cycles. Eclipses occur in nearly the same calendar date. In addition, the octon subseries repeats 1/5 of that or every 3.8 years (1387.94 days). All eclipses in this table occur at the Moon's descending node.

21 eclipse events between July 22, 1971 and July 22, 2047
| July 22 | May 9–11 | February 26–27 | December 14–15 | October 2–3 |
| 116 | 118 | 120 | 122 | 124 |
|---|---|---|---|---|
| July 22, 1971 | May 11, 1975 | February 26, 1979 | December 15, 1982 | October 3, 1986 |
| 126 | 128 | 130 | 132 | 134 |
| July 22, 1990 | May 10, 1994 | February 26, 1998 | December 14, 2001 | October 3, 2005 |
| 136 | 138 | 140 | 142 | 144 |
| July 22, 2009 | May 10, 2013 | February 26, 2017 | December 14, 2020 | October 2, 2024 |
| 146 | 148 | 150 | 152 | 154 |
| July 22, 2028 | May 9, 2032 | February 27, 2036 | December 15, 2039 | October 3, 2043 |
156
July 22, 2047

=== Tritos series ===
This eclipse is a part of a tritos cycle, repeating at alternating nodes every 135 synodic months (≈ 3986.63 days, or 11 years minus 1 month). Their appearance and longitude are irregular due to a lack of synchronization with the anomalistic month (period of perigee), but groupings of 3 tritos cycles (≈ 33 years minus 3 months) come close (≈ 434.044 anomalistic months), so eclipses are similar in these groupings.

Series members between 1801 and 2200
| January 1, 1805 (Saros 109) | | October 31, 1826 (Saros 111) | | August 28, 1848 (Saros 113) |
| July 29, 1859 (Saros 114) | June 28, 1870 (Saros 115) | May 27, 1881 (Saros 116) | April 26, 1892 (Saros 117) | March 29, 1903 (Saros 118) |
| February 25, 1914 (Saros 119) | January 24, 1925 (Saros 120) | December 25, 1935 (Saros 121) | November 23, 1946 (Saros 122) | October 23, 1957 (Saros 123) |
| September 22, 1968 (Saros 124) | August 22, 1979 (Saros 125) | July 22, 1990 (Saros 126) | June 21, 2001 (Saros 127) | May 20, 2012 (Saros 128) |
| April 20, 2023 (Saros 129) | March 20, 2034 (Saros 130) | February 16, 2045 (Saros 131) | January 16, 2056 (Saros 132) | December 17, 2066 (Saros 133) |
| November 15, 2077 (Saros 134) | October 14, 2088 (Saros 135) | September 14, 2099 (Saros 136) | August 15, 2110 (Saros 137) | July 14, 2121 (Saros 138) |
| June 13, 2132 (Saros 139) | May 14, 2143 (Saros 140) | April 12, 2154 (Saros 141) | March 12, 2165 (Saros 142) | February 10, 2176 (Saros 143) |
| January 9, 2187 (Saros 144) | December 9, 2197 (Saros 145) | | | |

=== Inex series ===
This eclipse is a part of the long period inex cycle, repeating at alternating nodes, every 358 synodic months (≈ 10,571.95 days, or 29 years minus 20 days). Their appearance and longitude are irregular due to a lack of synchronization with the anomalistic month (period of perigee). However, groupings of 3 inex cycles (≈ 87 years minus 2 months) comes close (≈ 1,151.02 anomalistic months), so eclipses are similar in these groupings.

Series members between 1801 and 2200
| November 19, 1816 (Saros 120) | October 30, 1845 (Saros 121) | October 10, 1874 (Saros 122) |
| September 21, 1903 (Saros 123) | August 31, 1932 (Saros 124) | August 11, 1961 (Saros 125) |
| July 22, 1990 (Saros 126) | July 2, 2019 (Saros 127) | June 11, 2048 (Saros 128) |
| May 22, 2077 (Saros 129) | May 3, 2106 (Saros 130) | April 13, 2135 (Saros 131) |
| March 23, 2164 (Saros 132) | March 3, 2193 (Saros 133) | |
