= Solar eclipse of February 26, 1979 =

Total eclipse in North America

- Total eclipse
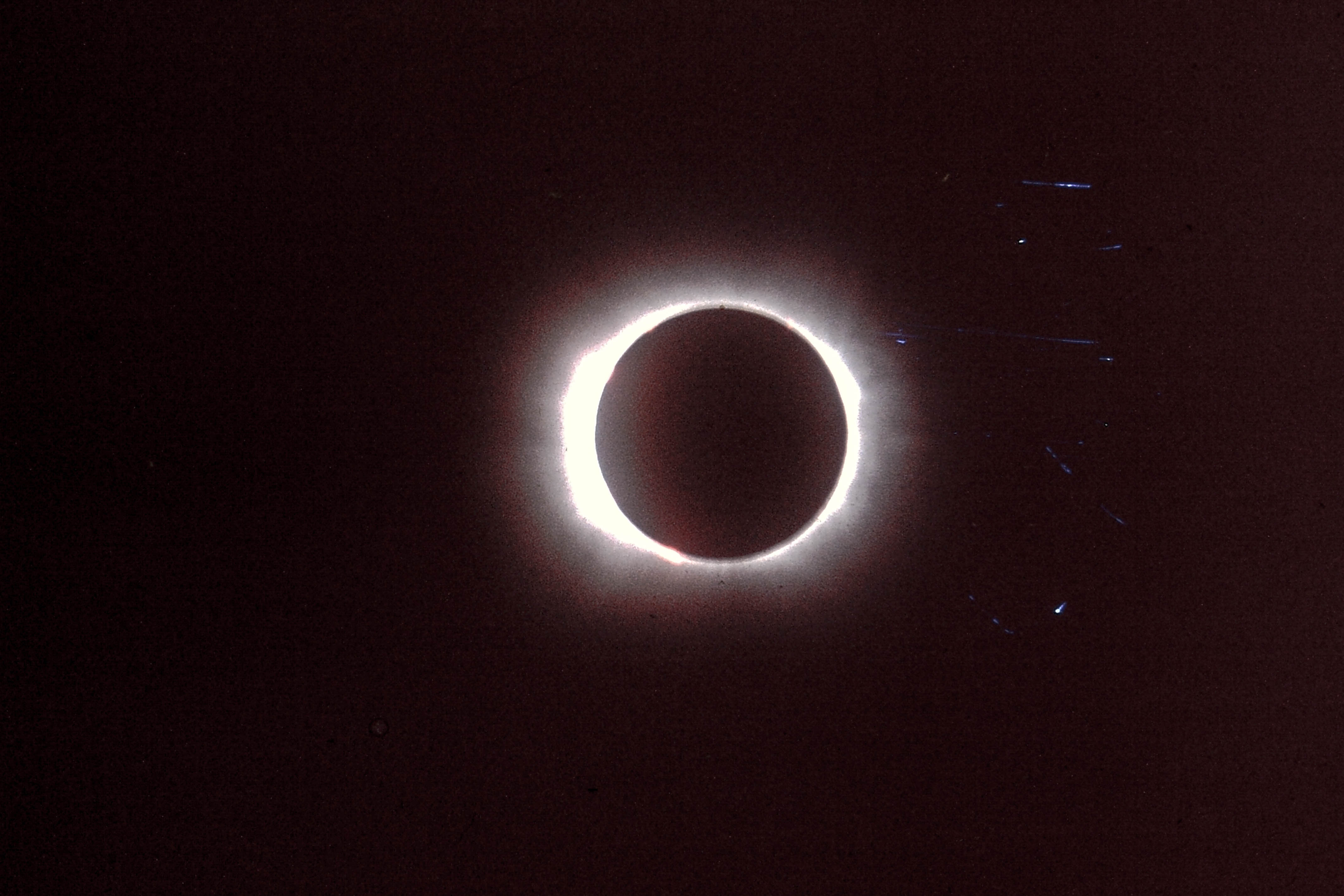
- Totality as seen from Brandon, Manitoba

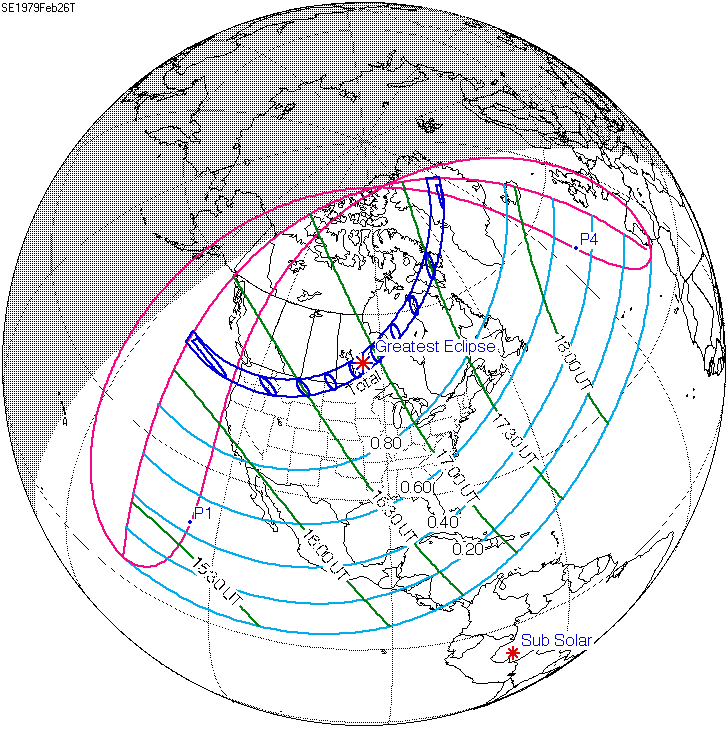
- Map
- Gamma: 0.8981
- Magnitude: 1.0391

Maximum eclipse
- Duration: 169 s (2 min 49 s)
- Coordinates: 52.1°N 94.5°W
- Max. width of band: 298 km (185 mi)

Times (UTC)
- Greatest eclipse: 16:55:06

References
- Saros: 120 (59 of 71)
- Catalog # (SE5000): 9462

A total solar eclipse occurred at the Moon's descending node of orbit on Monday, February 26, 1979, with a magnitude of 1.0391. A solar eclipse is an astronomical phenomenon that occurs when the Moon passes between Earth and the Sun, thereby totally or partly obscuring the image of the Sun for a viewer on Earth. A total solar eclipse occurs when the Moon's apparent diameter is larger than the Sun's, blocking all direct sunlight, turning day into darkness. Totality occurs in a narrow path across Earth's surface, with the partial solar eclipse visible over a surrounding region thousands of kilometres wide. Occurring about 19 hours after perigee (on February 25, 1979, at 22:20 UTC), the Moon's apparent diameter was larger.

The central shadow of the Moon passed through Washington, Oregon, Idaho, Montana (where totality covered almost the entire state), North Dakota, Saskatchewan, Manitoba, Ontario, Quebec, the Northwest Territories of Canada (the portion that is now Nunavut), and Greenland. A partial eclipse was visible for parts of North America, Central America, the Caribbean, and Western Europe.

== Visibility ==
Animation of eclipse path

=== United States ===
Many visitors traveled to the Pacific Northwest to view the Monday morning eclipse, as it was the last chance to view a total solar eclipse in the contiguous United States for 38 years, 5 months, 26 days. The next opportunity was on August 21, 2017. Several cities, including Lewiston, Idaho, and Goldendale, Washington, organized viewing events amid an expected bump in tourist traffic. Television station KING-TV of Seattle produced a live broadcast of the eclipse from Goldendale and other cities in the Northwest.

Although the path of totality passed through Portland shortly after sunrise (maximum at 8:14 am PST), it was not directly observable due to overcast skies in northwestern Oregon. At the Goldendale Observatory State Park in Washington, an estimated 10,000 people were able to view the eclipse after the overcast skies parted during totality. Over 1,000 aircraft were guided around the path of totality by local air traffic control offices; the volume of flights in the area caused delays to passenger service at Seattle–Tacoma International Airport and Portland International Airport. The Seattle-based Pacific Science Center chartered a Boeing 727 with 94 passengers to chase the eclipse.

=== Canada ===
About a half hour later, the path of totality was in Manitoba and passed through cloudless Winnipeg in the late morning, maximum was at 10:48 am CST. The greatest eclipse occurred seven minutes later at 10:55 am CST.

Canada's next total solar eclipse took place on August 1, 2008, after which Canada did not see another total solar eclipse until April 8, 2024.

== Observations ==
Portland, Oregon was the largest city within the path of totality. However, the thick clouds made observation unsuccessful. Only some areas outside the city could see the Sun through the holes in the clouds. There were also charter flights allowing passengers to observe from the air. Clouds covered most areas of the states of Oregon and Washington, and there were some clouds in western Montana. Observations were successful in places including North Dakota. Jay Pasachoff led a team from Williams College in Massachusetts to Brandon University in Manitoba, Canada and successfully observed the total eclipse there.

== In literature ==
Writer Annie Dillard viewed the eclipse from the Yakima River Valley in central Washington state. She described her impressions of the eclipse in an essay, "Total Eclipse", first published in the magazine Antaeus and then in her collection, Teaching a Stone to Talk (1982). It was later selected for inclusion in The Best American Essays of the [20th] Century (2000). Dillard describes a nearly overwhelming emotional experience, as suggested in this quotation: "I pray you will never see anything more awful in the sky." Describing the reactions of other onlookers, she relates "I heard screams."

The 1979 eclipse was also referenced in the opening pages of Douglas Coupland's novel, Generation X.

Totality from Bozeman, Montana

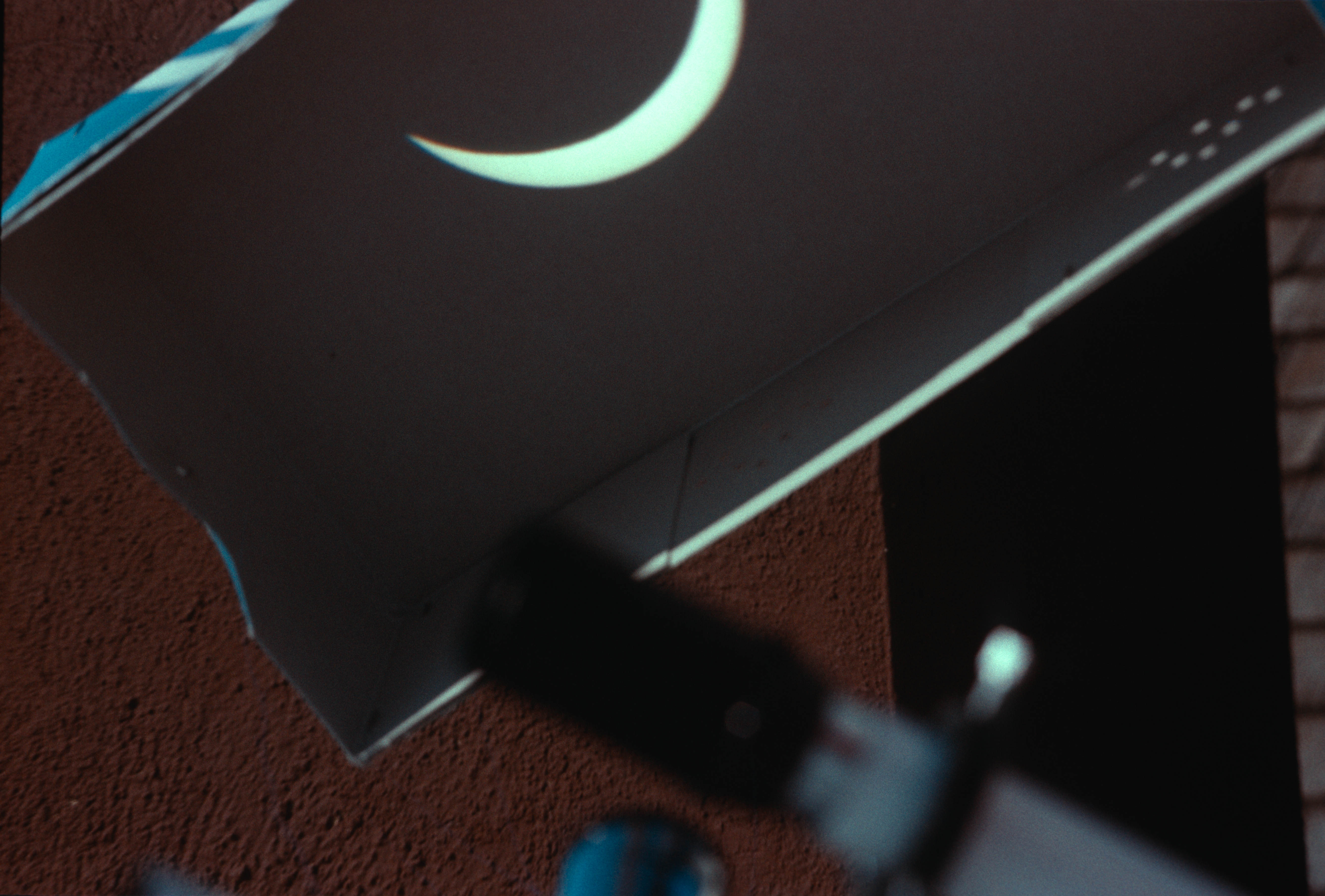
Projected partial eclipse from Scenic, South Dakota

== Eclipse details ==
Shown below are two tables displaying details about this particular solar eclipse. The first table outlines times at which the Moon's penumbra or umbra attains the specific parameter, and the second table describes various other parameters pertaining to this eclipse.

February 26, 1979 Solar Eclipse Times
Event	Time (UTC)
First Penumbral External Contact	1979 February 26 at 14:46:04.0 UTC
First Umbral External Contact	1979 February 26 at 16:08:06.6 UTC
First Central Line	1979 February 26 at 16:10:02.8 UTC
First Umbral Internal Contact	1979 February 26 at 16:12:03.2 UTC
Ecliptic Conjunction	1979 February 26 at 16:46:02.6 UTC
Greatest Duration	1979 February 26 at 16:54:19.3 UTC
Greatest Eclipse	1979 February 26 at 16:55:05.7 UTC
Equatorial Conjunction	1979 February 26 at 17:22:11.4 UTC
Last Umbral Internal Contact	1979 February 26 at 17:37:49.2 UTC
Last Central Line	1979 February 26 at 17:39:48.9 UTC
Last Umbral External Contact	1979 February 26 at 17:41:44.4 UTC
Last Penumbral External Contact	1979 February 26 at 19:03:56.4 UTC

February 26, 1979 Solar Eclipse Parameters
Parameter	Value
Eclipse Magnitude	1.03907
Eclipse Obscuration	1.07966
Gamma	0.89811
Sun Right Ascension	22h36m45.5s
Sun Declination	-08°45'23.7"
Sun Semi-Diameter	16'09.1"
Sun Equatorial Horizontal Parallax	08.9"
Moon Right Ascension	22h35m43.5s
Moon Declination	-07°52'47.4"
Moon Semi-Diameter	16'39.8"
Moon Equatorial Horizontal Parallax	1°01'09.4"
ΔT	49.7 s

== Eclipse season ==
This eclipse is part of an eclipse season, a period, roughly every six months, when eclipses occur. Only two (or occasionally three) eclipse seasons occur each year, and each season lasts about 35 days and repeats just short of six months (173 days) later; thus two full eclipse seasons always occur each year. Either two or three eclipses happen each eclipse season. In the sequence below, each eclipse is separated by a fortnight.

Eclipse season of February–March 1979
February 26 Descending node (new moon)	March 13 Ascending node (full moon)
Total solar eclipse Solar Saros 120	Partial lunar eclipse Lunar Saros 132

== Related eclipses ==
=== Eclipses in 1979 ===
- A total solar eclipse on February 26.
- A partial lunar eclipse on March 13.
- An annular solar eclipse on August 22.
- A total lunar eclipse on September 6.

=== Metonic ===
- Preceded by: Solar eclipse of May 11, 1975
- Followed by: Solar eclipse of December 15, 1982

=== Tzolkinex ===
- Preceded by: Solar eclipse of January 16, 1972
- Followed by: Solar eclipse of April 9, 1986

=== Half-Saros ===
- Preceded by: Lunar eclipse of February 21, 1970
- Followed by: Lunar eclipse of March 3, 1988

=== Tritos ===
- Preceded by: Solar eclipse of March 28, 1968
- Followed by: Solar eclipse of January 26, 1990

=== Solar Saros 120 ===
- Preceded by: Solar eclipse of February 15, 1961
- Followed by: Solar eclipse of March 9, 1997

=== Inex ===
- Preceded by: Solar eclipse of March 18, 1950
- Followed by: Solar eclipse of February 7, 2008

=== Triad ===
- Preceded by: Solar eclipse of April 26, 1892
- Followed by: Solar eclipse of December 27, 2065

=== Solar eclipses of 1979–1982 ===
This eclipse is a member of a semester series. An eclipse in a semester series of solar eclipses repeats approximately every 177 days and 4 hours (a semester) at alternating nodes of the Moon's orbit.

The partial solar eclipses on June 21, 1982 and December 15, 1982 occur in the next lunar year eclipse set.

Solar eclipse series sets from 1979 to 1982
Descending node			Ascending node		
Saros	Map	Gamma	Saros	Map	Gamma
120 Totality in Brandon, MB, Canada	February 26, 1979 Total	0.8981	125	August 22, 1979 Annular	−0.9632
130	February 16, 1980 Total	0.2224	135	August 10, 1980 Annular	−0.1915
140	February 4, 1981 Annular	−0.4838	145	July 31, 1981 Total	0.5792
150	January 25, 1982 Partial	−1.2311	155	July 20, 1982 Partial	1.2886

=== Saros 120 ===
This eclipse is a part of Saros series 120, repeating every 18 years, 11 days, and containing 71 events. The series started with a partial solar eclipse on May 27, 933 AD. It contains annular eclipses from August 11, 1059 through April 26, 1492; hybrid eclipses from May 8, 1510 through June 8, 1564; and total eclipses from June 20, 1582 through March 30, 2033. The series ends at member 71 as a partial eclipse on July 7, 2195. Its eclipses are tabulated in three columns; every third eclipse in the same column is one exeligmos apart, so they all cast shadows over approximately the same parts of the Earth.

The longest duration of annularity was produced by member 11 at 6 minutes, 24 seconds on September 11, 1113, and the longest duration of totality was produced by member 60 at 2 minutes, 50 seconds on March 9, 1997. All eclipses in this series occur at the Moon’s descending node of orbit.

Series members 50–71 occur between 1801 and 2195:
50	51	52
November 19, 1816	November 30, 1834	December 11, 1852
53	54	55
December 22, 1870	January 1, 1889	January 14, 1907
56	57	58
January 24, 1925	February 4, 1943	February 15, 1961
59	60	61
February 26, 1979	March 9, 1997	March 20, 2015
62	63	64
March 30, 2033	April 11, 2051	April 21, 2069
65	66	67
May 2, 2087	May 14, 2105	May 25, 2123
68	69	70
June 4, 2141	June 16, 2159	June 26, 2177
71
July 7, 2195

=== Metonic series ===
The metonic series repeats eclipses every 19 years (6939.69 days), lasting about 5 cycles. Eclipses occur in nearly the same calendar date. In addition, the octon subseries repeats 1/5 of that or every 3.8 years (1387.94 days). All eclipses in this table occur at the Moon's descending node.

21 eclipse events between July 22, 1971 and July 22, 2047
July 22	May 9–11	February 26–27	December 14–15	October 2–3
116	118	120	122	124
July 22, 1971	May 11, 1975	February 26, 1979	December 15, 1982	October 3, 1986
126	128	130	132	134
July 22, 1990	May 10, 1994	February 26, 1998	December 14, 2001	October 3, 2005
136	138	140	142	144
July 22, 2009	May 10, 2013	February 26, 2017	December 14, 2020	October 2, 2024
146	148	150	152	154
July 22, 2028	May 9, 2032	February 27, 2036	December 15, 2039	October 3, 2043
156
July 22, 2047

=== Tritos series ===
This eclipse is a part of a tritos cycle, repeating at alternating nodes every 135 synodic months (≈ 3986.63 days, or 11 years minus 1 month). Their appearance and longitude are irregular due to a lack of synchronization with the anomalistic month (period of perigee), but groupings of 3 tritos cycles (≈ 33 years minus 3 months) come close (≈ 434.044 anomalistic months), so eclipses are similar in these groupings.

Series members between 1837 and 2200
April 5, 1837 (Saros 107)	March 5, 1848 (Saros 108)	February 3, 1859 (Saros 109)		December 2, 1880 (Saros 111)
		August 31, 1913 (Saros 114)	July 31, 1924 (Saros 115)	June 30, 1935 (Saros 116)
May 30, 1946 (Saros 117)	April 30, 1957 (Saros 118)	March 28, 1968 (Saros 119)	February 26, 1979 (Saros 120)	January 26, 1990 (Saros 121)
December 25, 2000 (Saros 122)	November 25, 2011 (Saros 123)	October 25, 2022 (Saros 124)	September 23, 2033 (Saros 125)	August 23, 2044 (Saros 126)
July 24, 2055 (Saros 127)	June 22, 2066 (Saros 128)	May 22, 2077 (Saros 129)	April 21, 2088 (Saros 130)	March 21, 2099 (Saros 131)
February 18, 2110 (Saros 132)	January 19, 2121 (Saros 133)	December 19, 2131 (Saros 134)	November 17, 2142 (Saros 135)	October 17, 2153 (Saros 136)
September 16, 2164 (Saros 137)	August 16, 2175 (Saros 138)	July 16, 2186 (Saros 139)	June 15, 2197 (Saros 140)	

=== Inex series ===
This eclipse is a part of the long period inex cycle, repeating at alternating nodes, every 358 synodic months (≈ 10,571.95 days, or 29 years minus 20 days). Their appearance and longitude are irregular due to a lack of synchronization with the anomalistic month (period of perigee). However, groupings of 3 inex cycles (≈ 87 years minus 2 months) comes close (≈ 1,151.02 anomalistic months), so eclipses are similar in these groupings.

Series members between 1801 and 2200
June 26, 1805 (Saros 114)	June 7, 1834 (Saros 115)	May 17, 1863 (Saros 116)
April 26, 1892 (Saros 117)	April 8, 1921 (Saros 118)	March 18, 1950 (Saros 119)
February 26, 1979 (Saros 120)	February 7, 2008 (Saros 121)	January 16, 2037 (Saros 122)
December 27, 2065 (Saros 123)	December 7, 2094 (Saros 124)	November 18, 2123 (Saros 125)
October 28, 2152 (Saros 126)	October 8, 2181 (Saros 127)	
