= Solar eclipse of March 7, 1932 =

20th-century annular solar eclipse

- Annular eclipse
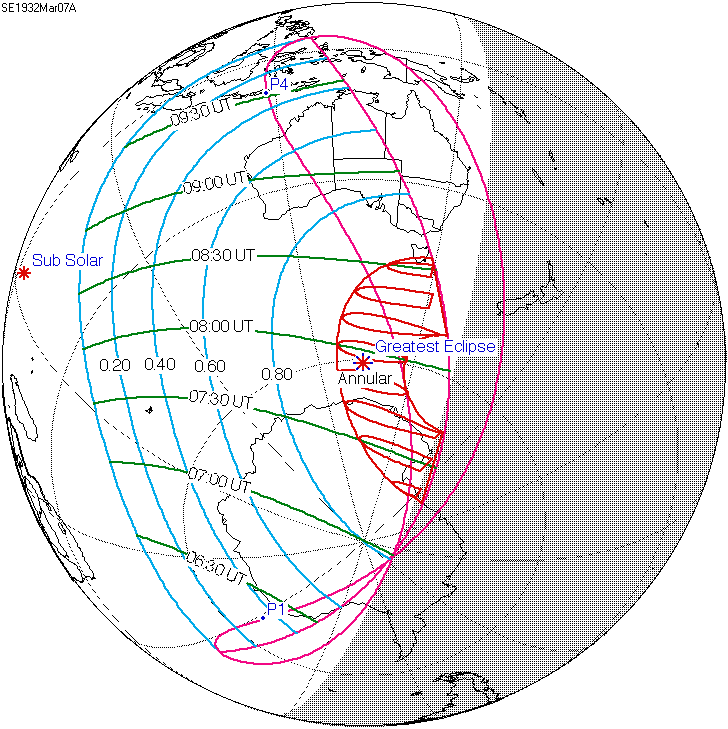
- Map
- Gamma: −0.9673
- Magnitude: 0.9277

Maximum eclipse
- Duration: 319 s (5 min 19 s)
- Coordinates: 60.7°S 134.4°E
- Max. width of band: 1,083 km (673 mi)

Times (UTC)
- Greatest eclipse: 7:55:50

References
- Saros: 119 (61 of 71)
- Catalog # (SE5000): 9356

An annular solar eclipse occurred at the Moon's ascending node of orbit on Monday, March 7, 1932, with a magnitude of 0.9277. A solar eclipse occurs when the Moon passes between Earth and the Sun, thereby totally or partly obscuring the image of the Sun for a viewer on Earth. An annular solar eclipse occurs when the Moon's apparent diameter is smaller than the Sun's, blocking most of the Sun's light and causing the Sun to look like an annulus (ring). An annular eclipse appears as a partial eclipse over a region of the Earth thousands of kilometres wide. Occurring about 3.6 days before apogee (on March 10, 1932, at 22:00 UTC), the Moon's apparent diameter was smaller.

Annularity was visible from parts of Antarctica and southern Tasmania. A partial eclipse was visible for parts of Antarctica, Australia, and Southeast Asia.

== Eclipse details ==
Shown below are two tables displaying details about this particular solar eclipse. The first table outlines times at which the Moon's penumbra or umbra attains the specific parameter, and the second table describes various other parameters pertaining to this eclipse.

March 7, 1932 Solar Eclipse Times
Event	Time (UTC)
First Penumbral External Contact	1932 March 7 at 05:31:28.9 UTC
Equatorial Conjunction	1932 March 7 at 06:54:13.1 UTC
First Umbral External Contact	1932 March 7 at 07:18:12.4 UTC
First Central Line	1932 March 7 at 07:27:34.8 UTC
First Umbral Internal Contact	1932 March 7 at 07:41:47.8 UTC
Ecliptic Conjunction	1932 March 7 at 07:44:37.0 UTC
Greatest Eclipse	1932 March 7 at 07:55:50.3 UTC
Greatest Duration	1932 March 7 at 07:56:35.0 UTC
Last Umbral Internal Contact	1932 March 7 at 08:10:29.9 UTC
Last Central Line	1932 March 7 at 08:24:44.0 UTC
Last Umbral External Contact	1932 March 7 at 08:34:07.6 UTC
Last Penumbral External Contact	1932 March 7 at 10:20:39.8 UTC

March 7, 1932 Solar Eclipse Parameters
Parameter	Value
Eclipse Magnitude	0.92767
Eclipse Obscuration	0.86057
Gamma	−0.96731
Sun Right Ascension	23h10m29.5s
Sun Declination	-05°18'43.8"
Sun Semi-Diameter	16'06.7"
Sun Equatorial Horizontal Parallax	08.9"
Moon Right Ascension	23h12m10.8s
Moon Declination	-06°05'03.9"
Moon Semi-Diameter	14'53.9"
Moon Equatorial Horizontal Parallax	0°54'40.6"
ΔT	23.9 s

== Eclipse season ==
This eclipse is part of an eclipse season, a period, roughly every six months, when eclipses occur. Only two (or occasionally three) eclipse seasons occur each year, and each season lasts about 35 days and repeats just short of six months (173 days) later; thus two full eclipse seasons always occur each year. Either two or three eclipses happen each eclipse season. In the sequence below, each eclipse is separated by a fortnight.

Eclipse season of March 1932
March 7 Ascending node (new moon)	March 22 Descending node (full moon)
Annular solar eclipse Solar Saros 119	Partial lunar eclipse Lunar Saros 131

== Related eclipses ==
=== Eclipses in 1932 ===
- An annular solar eclipse on March 7.
- A partial lunar eclipse on March 22.
- A total solar eclipse on August 31.
- A partial lunar eclipse on September 14.

=== Metonic ===
- Preceded by: Solar eclipse of May 19, 1928
- Followed by: Solar eclipse of December 25, 1935

=== Tzolkinex ===
- Preceded by: Solar eclipse of January 24, 1925
- Followed by: Solar eclipse of April 19, 1939

=== Half-Saros ===
- Preceded by: Lunar eclipse of March 3, 1923
- Followed by: Lunar eclipse of March 13, 1941

=== Tritos ===
- Preceded by: Solar eclipse of April 8, 1921
- Followed by: Solar eclipse of February 4, 1943

=== Solar Saros 119 ===
- Preceded by: Solar eclipse of February 25, 1914
- Followed by: Solar eclipse of March 18, 1950

=== Inex ===
- Preceded by: Solar eclipse of March 29, 1903
- Followed by: Solar eclipse of February 15, 1961

=== Triad ===
- Preceded by: Solar eclipse of May 6, 1845
- Followed by: Solar eclipse of January 6, 2019

=== Solar eclipses of 1931–1935 ===
This eclipse is a member of a semester series. An eclipse in a semester series of solar eclipses repeats approximately every 177 days and 4 hours (a semester) at alternating nodes of the Moon's orbit.

The partial solar eclipses on April 18, 1931 and October 11, 1931 occur in the previous lunar year eclipse set, and the solar eclipses on January 5, 1935 (partial), June 30, 1935 (partial), and December 25, 1935 (annular) occur in the next lunar year eclipse set.

Solar eclipse series sets from 1931 to 1935
Descending node			Ascending node		
Saros	Map	Gamma	Saros	Map	Gamma
114	September 12, 1931 Partial	1.506	119	March 7, 1932 Annular	−0.9673
124	August 31, 1932 Total	0.8307	129	February 24, 1933 Annular	−0.2191
134	August 21, 1933 Annular	0.0869	139	February 14, 1934 Total	0.4868
144	August 10, 1934 Annular	−0.689	149	February 3, 1935 Partial	1.1438
154	July 30, 1935 Partial	−1.4259			

=== Saros 119 ===
This eclipse is a part of Saros series 119, repeating every 18 years, 11 days, and containing 71 events. The series started with a partial solar eclipse on May 15, 850 AD. It contains total eclipses on August 9, 994 AD and August 20, 1012; a hybrid eclipse on August 31, 1030; and annular eclipses from September 10, 1048 through March 18, 1950. The series ends at member 71 as a partial eclipse on June 24, 2112. Its eclipses are tabulated in three columns; every third eclipse in the same column is one exeligmos apart, so they all cast shadows over approximately the same parts of the Earth.

The longest duration of totality was produced by member 10 at 32 seconds on August 20, 1012, and the longest duration of annularity was produced by member 44 at 7 minutes, 37 seconds on September 1, 1625. All eclipses in this series occur at the Moon’s ascending node of orbit.

Series members 54–71 occur between 1801 and 2112:
54	55	56
December 21, 1805	January 1, 1824	January 11, 1842
57	58	59
January 23, 1860	February 2, 1878	February 13, 1896
60	61	62
February 25, 1914	March 7, 1932	March 18, 1950
63	64	65
March 28, 1968	April 9, 1986	April 19, 2004
66	67	68
April 30, 2022	May 11, 2040	May 22, 2058
69	70	71
June 1, 2076	June 13, 2094	June 24, 2112

=== Metonic series ===
The metonic series repeats eclipses every 19 years (6939.69 days), lasting about 5 cycles. Eclipses occur in nearly the same calendar date. In addition, the octon subseries repeats 1/5 of that or every 3.8 years (1387.94 days). All eclipses in this table occur at the Moon's ascending node.

22 eclipse events between December 24, 1916 and July 31, 2000
December 24–25	October 12	July 31–August 1	May 19–20	March 7
111	113	115	117	119
December 24, 1916		July 31, 1924	May 19, 1928	March 7, 1932
121	123	125	127	129
December 25, 1935	October 12, 1939	August 1, 1943	May 20, 1947	March 7, 1951
131	133	135	137	139
December 25, 1954	October 12, 1958	July 31, 1962	May 20, 1966	March 7, 1970
141	143	145	147	149
December 24, 1973	October 12, 1977	July 31, 1981	May 19, 1985	March 7, 1989
151	153	155		
December 24, 1992	October 12, 1996	July 31, 2000		

=== Tritos series ===
This eclipse is a part of a tritos cycle, repeating at alternating nodes every 135 synodic months (≈ 3986.63 days, or 11 years minus 1 month). Their appearance and longitude are irregular due to a lack of synchronization with the anomalistic month (period of perigee), but groupings of 3 tritos cycles (≈ 33 years minus 3 months) come close (≈ 434.044 anomalistic months), so eclipses are similar in these groupings.

Series members between 1801 and 2200
March 14, 1801 (Saros 107)	February 12, 1812 (Saros 108)	January 12, 1823 (Saros 109)		November 10, 1844 (Saros 111)
		August 9, 1877 (Saros 114)	July 9, 1888 (Saros 115)	June 8, 1899 (Saros 116)
May 9, 1910 (Saros 117)	April 8, 1921 (Saros 118)	March 7, 1932 (Saros 119)	February 4, 1943 (Saros 120)	January 5, 1954 (Saros 121)
December 4, 1964 (Saros 122)	November 3, 1975 (Saros 123)	October 3, 1986 (Saros 124)	September 2, 1997 (Saros 125)	August 1, 2008 (Saros 126)
July 2, 2019 (Saros 127)	June 1, 2030 (Saros 128)	April 30, 2041 (Saros 129)	March 30, 2052 (Saros 130)	February 28, 2063 (Saros 131)
January 27, 2074 (Saros 132)	December 27, 2084 (Saros 133)	November 27, 2095 (Saros 134)	October 26, 2106 (Saros 135)	September 26, 2117 (Saros 136)
August 25, 2128 (Saros 137)	July 25, 2139 (Saros 138)	June 25, 2150 (Saros 139)	May 25, 2161 (Saros 140)	April 23, 2172 (Saros 141)
March 23, 2183 (Saros 142)	February 21, 2194 (Saros 143)			

=== Inex series ===
This eclipse is a part of the long period inex cycle, repeating at alternating nodes, every 358 synodic months (≈ 10,571.95 days, or 29 years minus 20 days). Their appearance and longitude are irregular due to a lack of synchronization with the anomalistic month (period of perigee). However, groupings of 3 inex cycles (≈ 87 years minus 2 months) comes close (≈ 1,151.02 anomalistic months), so eclipses are similar in these groupings.

Series members between 1801 and 2200
May 27, 1816 (Saros 115)	May 6, 1845 (Saros 116)	April 16, 1874 (Saros 117)
March 29, 1903 (Saros 118)	March 7, 1932 (Saros 119)	February 15, 1961 (Saros 120)
January 26, 1990 (Saros 121)	January 6, 2019 (Saros 122)	December 16, 2047 (Saros 123)
November 26, 2076 (Saros 124)	November 6, 2105 (Saros 125)	October 17, 2134 (Saros 126)
September 28, 2163 (Saros 127)	September 6, 2192 (Saros 128)	
