= Solar eclipse of November 19, 1816 =

Total eclipse

- Total eclipse
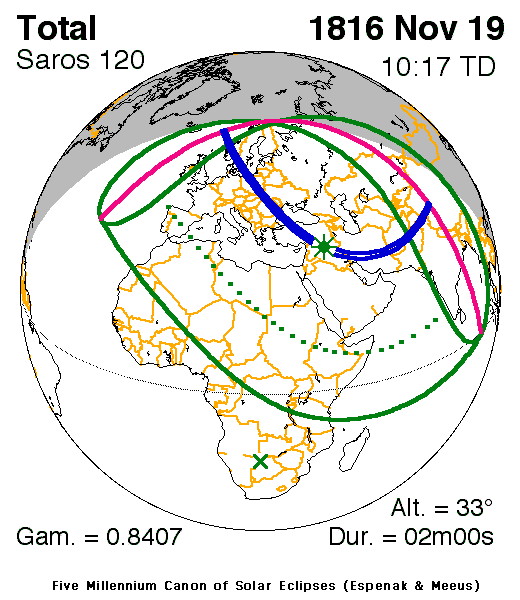
- Map
- Gamma: 0.8408
- Magnitude: 1.0233

Maximum eclipse
- Duration: 120 s (2 min 0 s)
- Coordinates: 35°N 41.5°E
- Max. width of band: 144 km (89 mi)

Times (UTC)
- Greatest eclipse: 10:17:23

References
- Saros: 120 (50 of 71)
- Catalog # (SE5000): 9081

A total solar eclipse occurred at the Moon's descending node of orbit on Tuesday, November 19, 1816, with a magnitude of 1.0233. A solar eclipse occurs when the Moon passes between Earth and the Sun, thereby totally or partly obscuring the image of the Sun for a viewer on Earth. A total solar eclipse occurs when the Moon's apparent diameter is larger than the Sun's, blocking all direct sunlight, turning day into darkness. Totality occurs in a narrow path across Earth's surface, with the partial solar eclipse visible over a surrounding region thousands of kilometres wide. Occurring about 1.7 days before perigee (on November 17, 1816, at 17:10 UTC), the Moon's apparent diameter was larger.

The path of totality was visible from parts of modern-day Norway, Sweden, Poland, western Ukraine, Romania, Turkey, Syria, Iraq, Iran, Afghanistan, Pakistan, northern India, and western China. A partial solar eclipse was also visible for parts of Europe, North Africa, Northeast Africa, the Middle East, Central Asia, and South Asia.

== Observations ==
From Germany, clouds largely obscured the eclipse in areas of the country apart from Pomerania.

Capel Lofft observed this eclipse from Ipswich.

== Eclipse details ==
Shown below are two tables displaying details about this particular solar eclipse. The first table outlines times at which the Moon's penumbra or umbra attains the specific parameter, and the second table describes various other parameters pertaining to this eclipse.

November 19, 1816 Solar Eclipse Times
Event	Time (UTC)
First Penumbral External Contact	1816 November 19 at 08:01:46.3 UTC
First Umbral External Contact	1816 November 19 at 09:20:18.4 UTC
First Central Line	1816 November 19 at 09:21:02.3 UTC
First Umbral Internal Contact	1816 November 19 at 09:21:46.7 UTC
Equatorial Conjunction	1816 November 19 at 09:47:11.3 UTC
Ecliptic Conjunction	1816 November 19 at 10:08:45.7 UTC
Greatest Eclipse	1816 November 19 at 10:17:22.4 UTC
Greatest Duration	1816 November 19 at 10:17:35.6 UTC
Last Umbral Internal Contact	1816 November 19 at 11:13:19.6 UTC
Last Central Line	1816 November 19 at 11:14:01.9 UTC
Last Umbral External Contact	1816 November 19 at 11:14:43.9 UTC
Last Penumbral External Contact	1816 November 19 at 12:33:14.9 UTC

November 19, 1816 Solar Eclipse Parameters
Parameter	Value
Eclipse Magnitude	1.02326
Eclipse Obscuration	1.04707
Gamma	0.84075
Sun Right Ascension	15h38m54.9s
Sun Declination	-19°30'48.2"
Sun Semi-Diameter	16'11.7"
Sun Equatorial Horizontal Parallax	08.9"
Moon Right Ascension	15h40m03.9s
Moon Declination	-18°42'56.6"
Moon Semi-Diameter	16'25.6"
Moon Equatorial Horizontal Parallax	1°00'17.2"
ΔT	12.2 s

== Eclipse season ==
This eclipse is part of an eclipse season, a period, roughly every six months, when eclipses occur. Only two (or occasionally three) eclipse seasons occur each year, and each season lasts about 35 days and repeats just short of six months (173 days) later; thus two full eclipse seasons always occur each year. Either two or three eclipses happen each eclipse season. In the sequence below, each eclipse is separated by a fortnight.

Eclipse season of November–December 1816
November 19 Descending node (new moon)	December 4 Ascending node (full moon)
Total solar eclipse Solar Saros 120	Partial lunar eclipse Lunar Saros 132

== Related eclipses ==
=== Eclipses in 1816 ===
- An annular solar eclipse on May 27.
- A total lunar eclipse on June 10.
- A total solar eclipse on November 19.
- A partial lunar eclipse on December 4.

=== Metonic ===
- Preceded by: Solar eclipse of February 1, 1813
- Followed by: Solar eclipse of September 7, 1820

=== Tzolkinex ===
- Preceded by: Solar eclipse of October 9, 1809
- Followed by: Solar eclipse of January 1, 1824

=== Half-Saros ===
- Preceded by: Lunar eclipse of November 15, 1807
- Followed by: Lunar eclipse of November 25, 1825

=== Tritos ===
- Preceded by: Solar eclipse of December 21, 1805
- Followed by: Solar eclipse of October 20, 1827

=== Solar Saros 120 ===
- Preceded by: Solar eclipse of November 8, 1798
- Followed by: Solar eclipse of November 30, 1834

=== Inex ===
- Preceded by: Solar eclipse of December 9, 1787
- Followed by: Solar eclipse of October 30, 1845

=== Triad ===
- Preceded by: Solar eclipse of January 18, 1730
- Followed by: Solar eclipse of September 21, 1903

=== Solar eclipses of 1816–1819 ===
This eclipse is a member of a semester series. An eclipse in a semester series of solar eclipses repeats approximately every 177 days and 4 hours (a semester) at alternating nodes of the Moon's orbit.

The partial solar eclipses on March 25, 1819 and September 19, 1819 occur in the next lunar year eclipse set.

Solar eclipse series sets from 1816 to 1819
Ascending node			Descending node		
Saros	Map	Gamma	Saros	Map	Gamma
115	May 27, 1816 Annular	−0.9492	120	November 19, 1816 Total	0.8408
125	May 16, 1817 Annular	−0.2049	130	November 9, 1817 Total	0.1487
135	May 5, 1818 Annular	0.5440	140	October 29, 1818 Total	−0.5524
145	April 24, 1819 Partial	1.2579	150	October 19, 1819 Partial	−1.3226

=== Saros 120 ===
This eclipse is a part of Saros series 120, repeating every 18 years, 11 days, and containing 71 events. The series started with a partial solar eclipse on May 27, 933 AD. It contains annular eclipses from August 11, 1059 through April 26, 1492; hybrid eclipses from May 8, 1510 through June 8, 1564; and total eclipses from June 20, 1582 through March 30, 2033. The series ends at member 71 as a partial eclipse on July 7, 2195. Its eclipses are tabulated in three columns; every third eclipse in the same column is one exeligmos apart, so they all cast shadows over approximately the same parts of the Earth.

The longest duration of annularity was produced by member 11 at 6 minutes, 24 seconds on September 11, 1113, and the longest duration of totality was produced by member 60 at 2 minutes, 50 seconds on March 9, 1997. All eclipses in this series occur at the Moon’s descending node of orbit.

Series members 50–71 occur between 1801 and 2195:
50	51	52
November 19, 1816	November 30, 1834	December 11, 1852
53	54	55
December 22, 1870	January 1, 1889	January 14, 1907
56	57	58
January 24, 1925	February 4, 1943	February 15, 1961
59	60	61
February 26, 1979	March 9, 1997	March 20, 2015
62	63	64
March 30, 2033	April 11, 2051	April 21, 2069
65	66	67
May 2, 2087	May 14, 2105	May 25, 2123
68	69	70
June 4, 2141	June 16, 2159	June 26, 2177
71
July 7, 2195

=== Metonic series ===
The metonic series repeats eclipses every 19 years (6939.69 days), lasting about 5 cycles. Eclipses occur in nearly the same calendar date. In addition, the octon subseries repeats 1/5 of that or every 3.8 years (1387.94 days). All eclipses in this table occur at the Moon's descending node.

22 eclipse events between September 8, 1801 and September 7, 1877
September 7–8	June 26–27	April 14–15	January 31–February 1	November 19–20
112	114	116	118	120
September 8, 1801	June 26, 1805	April 14, 1809	February 1, 1813	November 19, 1816
122	124	126	128	130
September 7, 1820	June 26, 1824	April 14, 1828	February 1, 1832	November 20, 1835
132	134	136	138	140
September 7, 1839	June 27, 1843	April 15, 1847	February 1, 1851	November 20, 1854
142	144	146	148	150
September 7, 1858	June 27, 1862	April 15, 1866	January 31, 1870	November 20, 1873
152
September 7, 1877

=== Tritos series ===
This eclipse is a part of a tritos cycle, repeating at alternating nodes every 135 synodic months (≈ 3986.63 days, or 11 years minus 1 month). Their appearance and longitude are irregular due to a lack of synchronization with the anomalistic month (period of perigee), but groupings of 3 tritos cycles (≈ 33 years minus 3 months) come close (≈ 434.044 anomalistic months), so eclipses are similar in these groupings.

Series members between 1801 and 2200
December 21, 1805 (Saros 119)	November 19, 1816 (Saros 120)	October 20, 1827 (Saros 121)	September 18, 1838 (Saros 122)	August 18, 1849 (Saros 123)
July 18, 1860 (Saros 124)	June 18, 1871 (Saros 125)	May 17, 1882 (Saros 126)	April 16, 1893 (Saros 127)	March 17, 1904 (Saros 128)
February 14, 1915 (Saros 129)	January 14, 1926 (Saros 130)	December 13, 1936 (Saros 131)	November 12, 1947 (Saros 132)	October 12, 1958 (Saros 133)
September 11, 1969 (Saros 134)	August 10, 1980 (Saros 135)	July 11, 1991 (Saros 136)	June 10, 2002 (Saros 137)	May 10, 2013 (Saros 138)
April 8, 2024 (Saros 139)	March 9, 2035 (Saros 140)	February 5, 2046 (Saros 141)	January 5, 2057 (Saros 142)	December 6, 2067 (Saros 143)
November 4, 2078 (Saros 144)	October 4, 2089 (Saros 145)	September 4, 2100 (Saros 146)	August 4, 2111 (Saros 147)	July 4, 2122 (Saros 148)
June 3, 2133 (Saros 149)	May 3, 2144 (Saros 150)	April 2, 2155 (Saros 151)	March 2, 2166 (Saros 152)	January 29, 2177 (Saros 153)
December 29, 2187 (Saros 154)	November 28, 2198 (Saros 155)			

=== Inex series ===
This eclipse is a part of the long period inex cycle, repeating at alternating nodes, every 358 synodic months (≈ 10,571.95 days, or 29 years minus 20 days). Their appearance and longitude are irregular due to a lack of synchronization with the anomalistic month (period of perigee). However, groupings of 3 inex cycles (≈ 87 years minus 2 months) comes close (≈ 1,151.02 anomalistic months), so eclipses are similar in these groupings.

Series members between 1801 and 2200
November 19, 1816 (Saros 120)	October 30, 1845 (Saros 121)	October 10, 1874 (Saros 122)
September 21, 1903 (Saros 123)	August 31, 1932 (Saros 124)	August 11, 1961 (Saros 125)
July 22, 1990 (Saros 126)	July 2, 2019 (Saros 127)	June 11, 2048 (Saros 128)
May 22, 2077 (Saros 129)	May 3, 2106 (Saros 130)	April 13, 2135 (Saros 131)
March 23, 2164 (Saros 132)	March 3, 2193 (Saros 133)	
