= Solar eclipse of July 8, 1842 =

Total eclipse

- Total eclipse
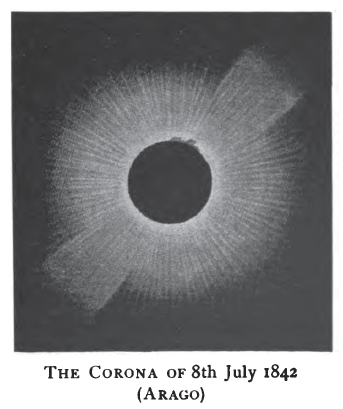

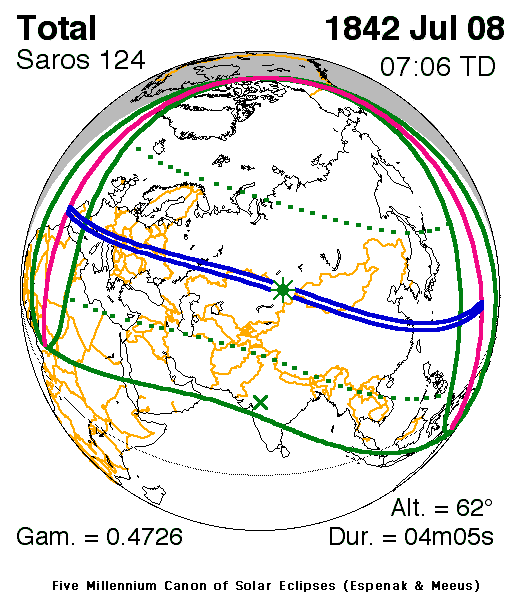
- Map
- Gamma: 0.4727
- Magnitude: 1.0543

Maximum eclipse
- Duration: 245 s (4 min 5 s)
- Coordinates: 50.1°N 83.6°E
- Max. width of band: 204 km (127 mi)

Times (UTC)
- Greatest eclipse: 7:06:27

References
- Saros: 124 (45 of 73)
- Catalog # (SE5000): 9145

A total solar eclipse occurred at the Moon's descending node of orbit on Friday, July 8, 1842, with a magnitude of 1.0543. A solar eclipse occurs when the Moon passes between Earth and the Sun, thereby totally or partly obscuring the image of the Sun for a viewer on Earth. A total solar eclipse occurs when the Moon's apparent diameter is larger than the Sun's, blocking all direct sunlight, turning day into darkness. Totality occurs in a narrow path across Earth's surface, with the partial solar eclipse visible over a surrounding region thousands of kilometres wide. Occurring about 2 days before perigee (on July 10, 1842, at 7:50 UTC), the Moon's apparent diameter was larger.

The path of totality was visible from parts of modern-day Portugal, Spain, Andorra, France, Monaco, Italy, Austria, Slovenia, Hungary, Slovakia, southeastern Poland, Ukraine, southeastern Belarus, Russia, Kazakhstan, Mongolia, China, the Ryukyu Islands, and the Northern Mariana Islands. A partial solar eclipse was also visible for parts of Europe, North Africa, Asia, Alaska, Greenland, and northern Canada.

== Observations ==
Francis Baily observed the total solar eclipse from Italy, focusing his attention on the solar corona and prominences and identified them as part of the Sun's atmosphere. The solar eclipse effect now called Baily's beads named in honor of him after his correct explanation of the phenomenon in 1836.

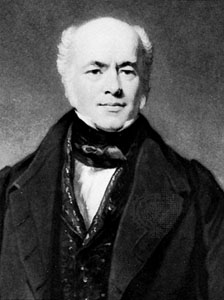
Francis Baily

== Artistic depictions ==
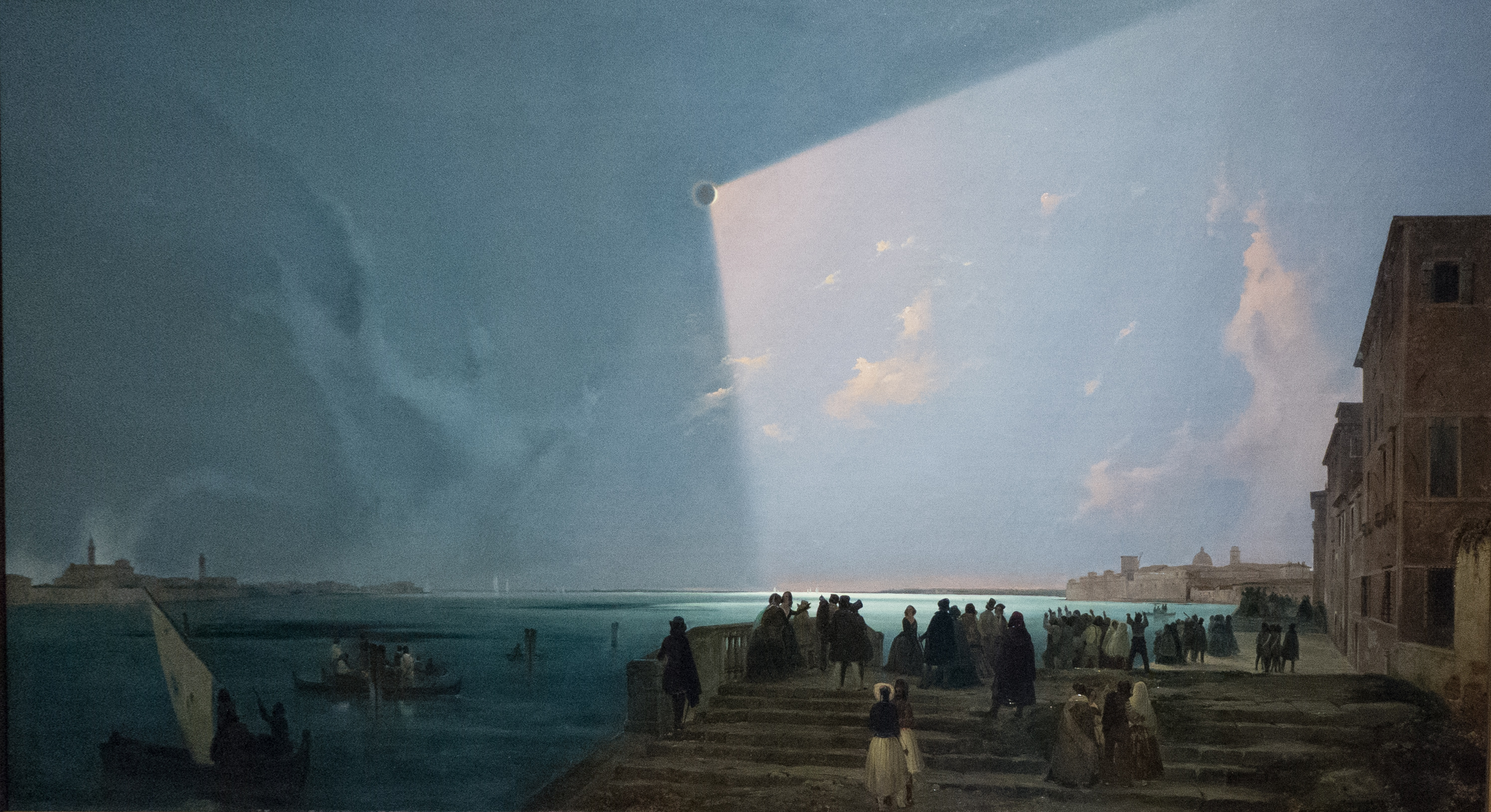
Venice, Ippolito Caffi

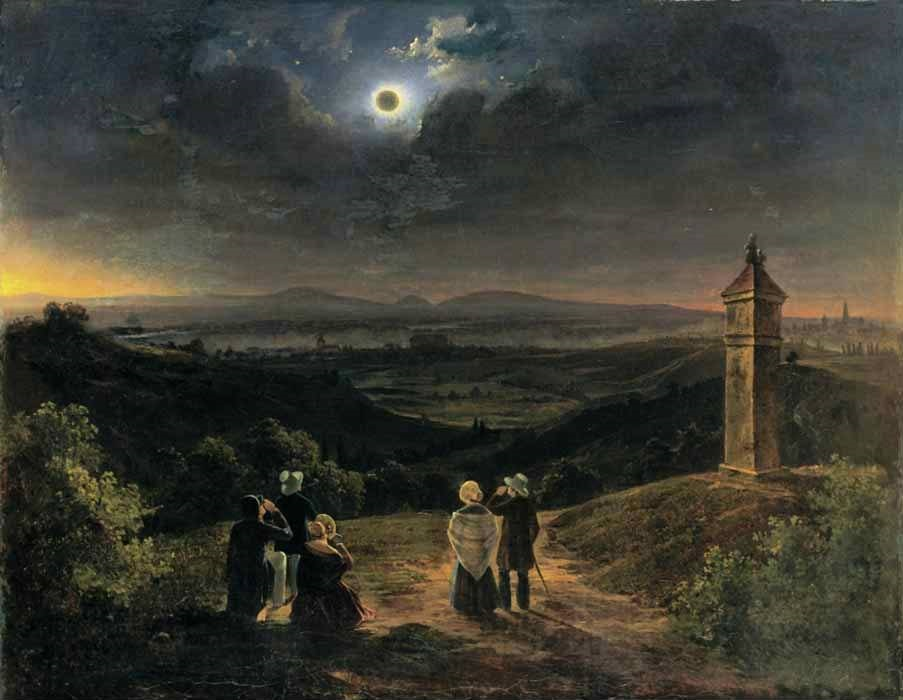
Austria, Jakob Alt

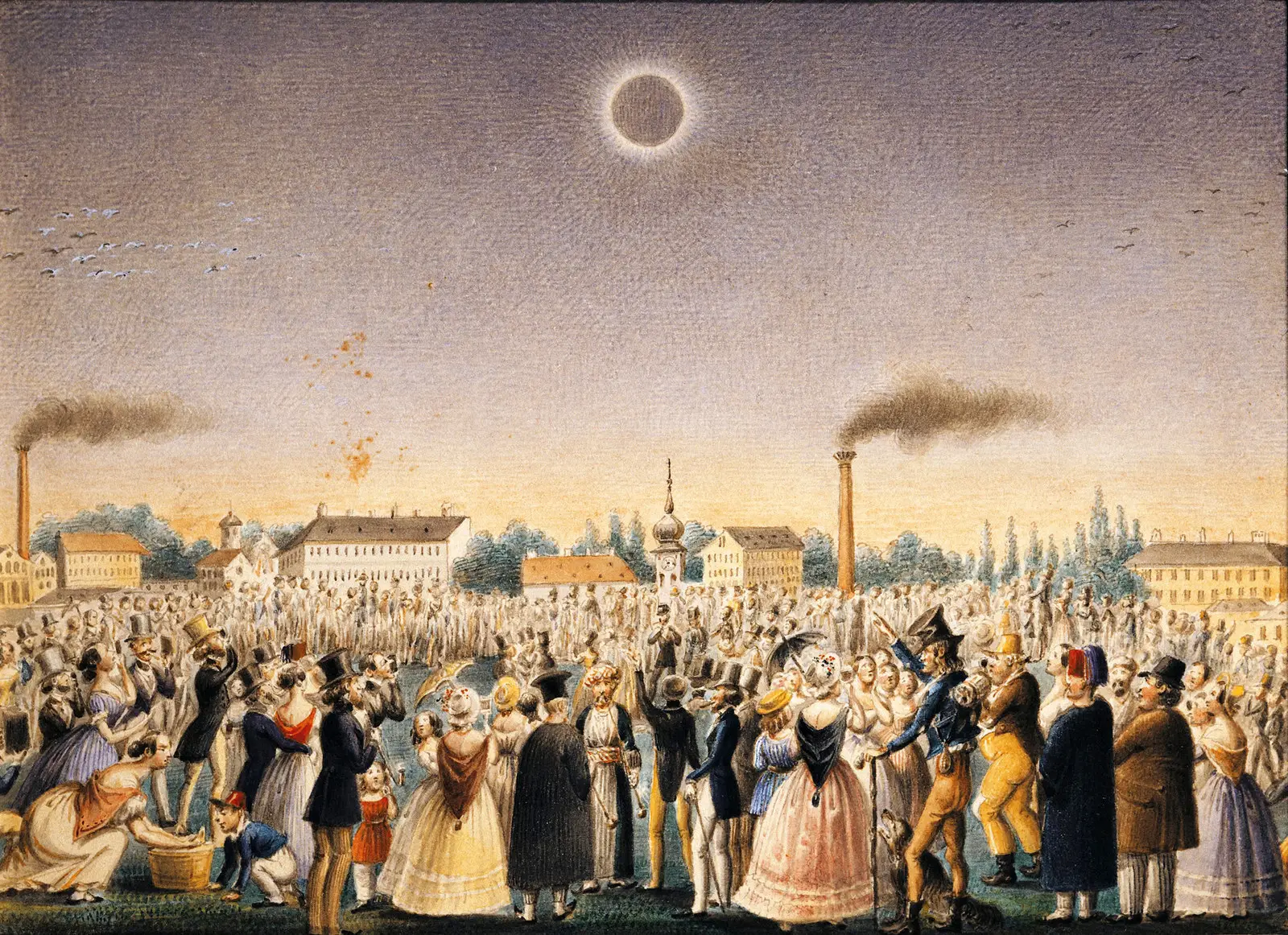
Vienna, Johann Christian Schoeller

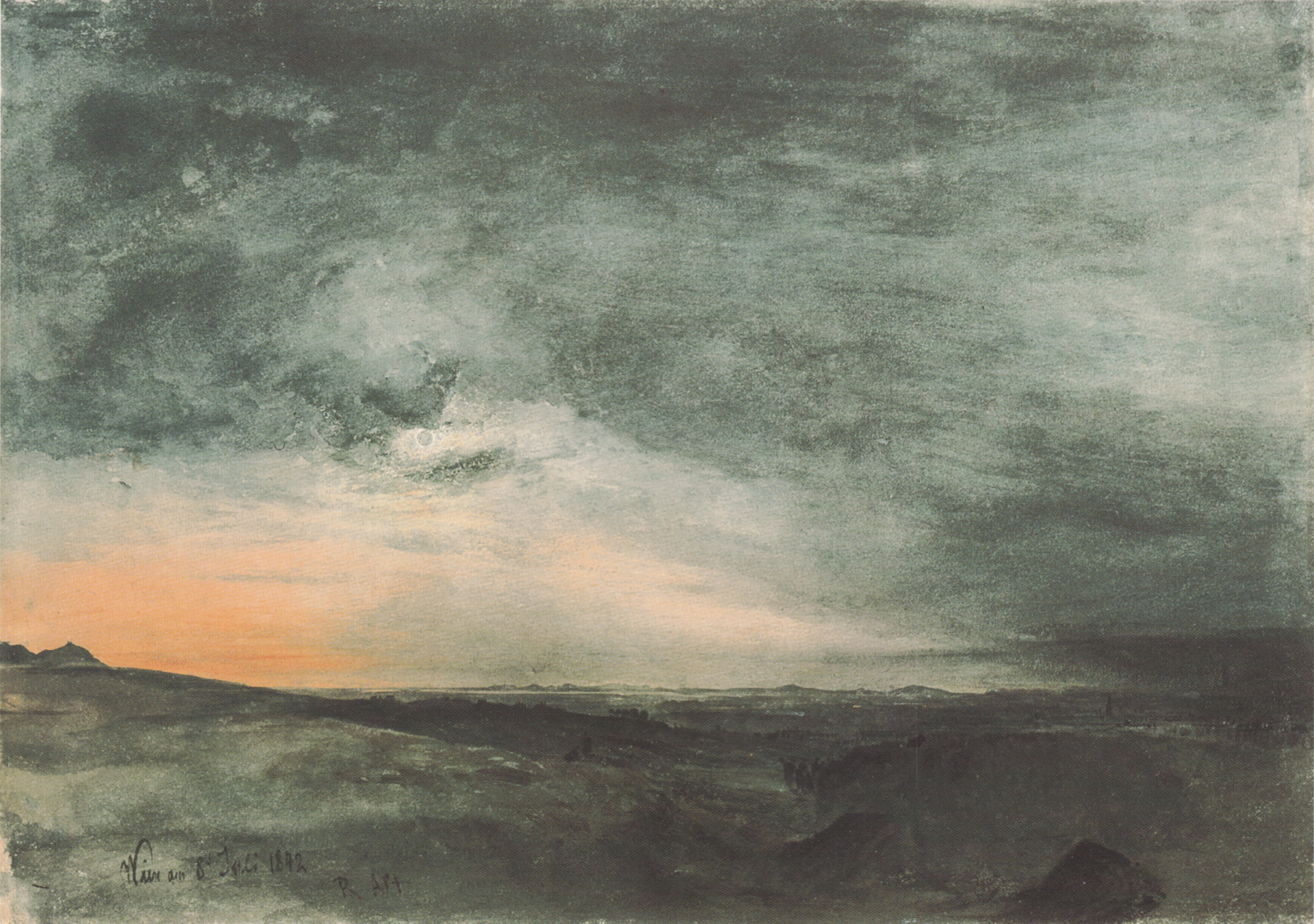
Vienna, Rudolf von Alt

== Eclipse details ==
Shown below are two tables displaying details about this particular solar eclipse. The first table outlines times at which the Moon's penumbra or umbra attains the specific parameter, and the second table describes various other parameters pertaining to this eclipse.

July 8, 1842 Solar Eclipse Times
Event	Time (UTC)
First Penumbral External Contact	1842 July 8 at 04:32:40.3 UTC
First Umbral External Contact	1842 July 8 at 05:32:39.4 UTC
First Central Line	1842 July 8 at 05:33:50.6 UTC
First Umbral Internal Contact	1842 July 8 at 05:35:02.0 UTC
Equatorial Conjunction	1842 July 8 at 06:55:35.2 UTC
Ecliptic Conjunction	1842 July 8 at 07:01:31.8 UTC
Greatest Duration	1842 July 8 at 07:04:59.2 UTC
Greatest Eclipse	1842 July 8 at 07:06:26.9 UTC
Last Umbral Internal Contact	1842 July 8 at 08:37:56.8 UTC
Last Central Line	1842 July 8 at 08:39:10.0 UTC
Last Umbral External Contact	1842 July 8 at 08:40:23.1 UTC
Last Penumbral External Contact	1842 July 8 at 09:40:14.0 UTC

July 8, 1842 Solar Eclipse Parameters
Parameter	Value
Eclipse Magnitude	1.05427
Eclipse Obscuration	1.11149
Gamma	0.47266
Sun Right Ascension	07h07m53.4s
Sun Declination	+22°32'34.5"
Sun Semi-Diameter	15'43.8"
Sun Equatorial Horizontal Parallax	08.6"
Moon Right Ascension	07h08m19.7s
Moon Declination	+23°00'12.1"
Moon Semi-Diameter	16'20.6"
Moon Equatorial Horizontal Parallax	0°59'58.8"
ΔT	5.5 s

== Eclipse season ==
This eclipse is part of an eclipse season, a period, roughly every six months, when eclipses occur. Only two (or occasionally three) eclipse seasons occur each year, and each season lasts about 35 days and repeats just short of six months (173 days) later; thus two full eclipse seasons always occur each year. Either two or three eclipses happen each eclipse season. In the sequence below, each eclipse is separated by a fortnight.

Eclipse season of July 1842
July 8 Descending node (new moon)	July 22 Ascending node (full moon)
Total solar eclipse Solar Saros 124	Partial lunar eclipse Lunar Saros 136

== Related eclipses ==
=== Eclipses in 1842 ===
- An annular solar eclipse on January 11.
- A partial lunar eclipse on January 26.
- A total solar eclipse on July 8.
- A partial lunar eclipse on July 22.
- A penumbral lunar eclipse on December 17.
- An annular solar eclipse on December 31.

=== Metonic ===
- Preceded by: Solar eclipse of September 18, 1838
- Followed by: Solar eclipse of April 25, 1846

=== Tzolkinex ===
- Preceded by: Solar eclipse of May 27, 1835
- Followed by: Solar eclipse of August 18, 1849

=== Half-Saros ===
- Preceded by: Lunar eclipse of July 2, 1833
- Followed by: Lunar eclipse of July 13, 1851

=== Tritos ===
- Preceded by: Solar eclipse of August 7, 1831
- Followed by: Solar eclipse of June 6, 1853

=== Solar Saros 124 ===
- Preceded by: Solar eclipse of June 26, 1824
- Followed by: Solar eclipse of July 18, 1860

=== Inex ===
- Preceded by: Solar eclipse of July 27, 1813
- Followed by: Solar eclipse of June 18, 1871

=== Triad ===
- Preceded by: Solar eclipse of September 6, 1755
- Followed by: Solar eclipse of May 9, 1929

=== Solar eclipses of 1841–1844 ===
This eclipse is a member of a semester series. An eclipse in a semester series of solar eclipses repeats approximately every 177 days and 4 hours (a semester) at alternating nodes of the Moon's orbit.

The partial solar eclipses on February 21, 1841 and August 16, 1841 occur in the previous lunar year eclipse set, and the partial solar eclipse on November 10, 1844 occurs in the next lunar year eclipse set.

Solar eclipse series sets from 1841 to 1844
Ascending node			Descending node		
Saros	Map	Gamma	Saros	Map	Gamma
109	January 22, 1841 Partial	−1.5516	114	July 18, 1841 Partial	1.1903
119	January 11, 1842 Annular	−0.8882	124	July 8, 1842 Total	0.4727
129	December 31, 1842 Annular	−0.1727	134	June 27, 1843 Hybrid	−0.3037
139	December 21, 1843 Total	0.5227	144	June 16, 1844 Partial	−1.1092
149	December 9, 1844 Partial	1.1682			

=== Saros 124 ===
This eclipse is a part of Saros series 124, repeating every 18 years, 11 days, and containing 73 events. The series started with a partial solar eclipse on March 6, 1049. It contains total eclipses from June 12, 1211 through September 22, 1968, and a hybrid eclipse on October 3, 1986. There are no annular eclipses in this set. The series ends at member 73 as a partial eclipse on May 11, 2347. Its eclipses are tabulated in three columns; every third eclipse in the same column is one exeligmos apart, so they all cast shadows over approximately the same parts of the Earth.

The longest duration of totality was produced by member 39 at 5 minutes, 46 seconds on May 3, 1734. All eclipses in this series occur at the Moon’s descending node of orbit.

Series members 43–64 occur between 1801 and 2200:
43	44	45
June 16, 1806	June 26, 1824	July 8, 1842
46	47	48
July 18, 1860	July 29, 1878	August 9, 1896
49	50	51
August 21, 1914	August 31, 1932	September 12, 1950
52	53	54
September 22, 1968	October 3, 1986	October 14, 2004
55	56	57
October 25, 2022	November 4, 2040	November 16, 2058
58	59	60
November 26, 2076	December 7, 2094	December 19, 2112
61	62	63
December 30, 2130	January 9, 2149	January 21, 2167
64
January 31, 2185

=== Metonic series ===
The metonic series repeats eclipses every 19 years (6939.69 days), lasting about 5 cycles. Eclipses occur in nearly the same calendar date. In addition, the octon subseries repeats 1/5 of that or every 3.8 years (1387.94 days). All eclipses in this table occur at the Moon's ascending node.

25 eclipse events between February 12, 1812 and September 18, 1895
February 11–12	November 30–December 1	September 17–19	July 7–8	April 25–26
108	110	112	114	116
February 12, 1812		September 19, 1819	July 8, 1823	April 26, 1827
118	120	122	124	126
February 12, 1831	November 30, 1834	September 18, 1838	July 8, 1842	April 25, 1846
128	130	132	134	136
February 12, 1850	November 30, 1853	September 18, 1857	July 8, 1861	April 25, 1865
138	140	142	144	146
February 11, 1869	November 30, 1872	September 17, 1876	July 7, 1880	April 25, 1884
148	150	152		
February 11, 1888	December 1, 1891	September 18, 1895		

=== Tritos series ===
This eclipse is a part of a tritos cycle, repeating at alternating nodes every 135 synodic months (≈ 3986.63 days, or 11 years minus 1 month). Their appearance and longitude are irregular due to a lack of synchronization with the anomalistic month (period of perigee), but groupings of 3 tritos cycles (≈ 33 years minus 3 months) come close (≈ 434.044 anomalistic months), so eclipses are similar in these groupings.

Series members between 1801 and 2200
October 9, 1809 (Saros 121)	September 7, 1820 (Saros 122)	August 7, 1831 (Saros 123)	July 8, 1842 (Saros 124)	June 6, 1853 (Saros 125)
May 6, 1864 (Saros 126)	April 6, 1875 (Saros 127)	March 5, 1886 (Saros 128)	February 1, 1897 (Saros 129)	January 3, 1908 (Saros 130)
December 3, 1918 (Saros 131)	November 1, 1929 (Saros 132)	October 1, 1940 (Saros 133)	September 1, 1951 (Saros 134)	July 31, 1962 (Saros 135)
June 30, 1973 (Saros 136)	May 30, 1984 (Saros 137)	April 29, 1995 (Saros 138)	March 29, 2006 (Saros 139)	February 26, 2017 (Saros 140)
January 26, 2028 (Saros 141)	December 26, 2038 (Saros 142)	November 25, 2049 (Saros 143)	October 24, 2060 (Saros 144)	September 23, 2071 (Saros 145)
August 24, 2082 (Saros 146)	July 23, 2093 (Saros 147)	June 22, 2104 (Saros 148)	May 24, 2115 (Saros 149)	April 22, 2126 (Saros 150)
March 21, 2137 (Saros 151)	February 19, 2148 (Saros 152)	January 19, 2159 (Saros 153)	December 18, 2169 (Saros 154)	November 17, 2180 (Saros 155)
October 18, 2191 (Saros 156)

=== Inex series ===
This eclipse is a part of the long period inex cycle, repeating at alternating nodes, every 358 synodic months (≈ 10,571.95 days, or 29 years minus 20 days). Their appearance and longitude are irregular due to a lack of synchronization with the anomalistic month (period of perigee). However, groupings of 3 inex cycles (≈ 87 years minus 2 months) comes close (≈ 1,151.02 anomalistic months), so eclipses are similar in these groupings.

Series members between 1801 and 2200
July 27, 1813 (Saros 123)	July 8, 1842 (Saros 124)	June 18, 1871 (Saros 125)
May 28, 1900 (Saros 126)	May 9, 1929 (Saros 127)	April 19, 1958 (Saros 128)
March 29, 1987 (Saros 129)	March 9, 2016 (Saros 130)	February 16, 2045 (Saros 131)
January 27, 2074 (Saros 132)	January 8, 2103 (Saros 133)	December 19, 2131 (Saros 134)
November 27, 2160 (Saros 135)	November 8, 2189 (Saros 136)	
