= Solar eclipse of October 3, 1986 =

Hybrid eclipse

- Hybrid eclipse
- Map
- Gamma: 0.9931
- Magnitude: 1

Maximum eclipse
- Duration: 0 s (0 min 0 s)
- Coordinates: 59.9°N 37.1°W
- Max. width of band: 1 km (0.62 mi)

Times (UTC)
- Greatest eclipse: 19:06:15

References
- Saros: 124 (53 of 73)
- Catalog # (SE5000): 9479

A total solar eclipse occurred at the Moon's descending node of orbit on Friday, October 3, 1986, with a magnitude of 1. It was a hybrid event, with only a fraction of its path as total, and longer sections at the start and end as an annular eclipse. A solar eclipse occurs when the Moon passes between Earth and the Sun, thereby totally or partly obscuring the image of the Sun for a viewer on Earth. A hybrid solar eclipse is a rare type of solar eclipse that changes its appearance from annular to total and back as the Moon's shadow moves across the Earth's surface. Totality occurs between the annularity paths across the surface of the Earth, with the partial solar eclipse visible over a surrounding region thousands of kilometres wide. The Moon's apparent diameter was near the average diameter because it occurred 8.3 days after apogee (on September 25, 1986, at 11:00 UTC) and 3.7 days before perigee (on October 7, 1986, at 10:50 UTC).

Totality occurred for a very short time (calculated at 0.08 seconds) in an area in the Atlantic Ocean, just east of the southern tip of Greenland. The path, on the surface of the Earth, was a narrow, tapered, horse-shoe, and visible only from a thin strip between Iceland and Greenland. A partial eclipse was visible for parts of North America, Central America, the Caribbean, northern South America, and Iceland. This eclipse was the last central eclipse of Solar Saros 124 and the only hybrid eclipse of that cycle.

== Observations ==
The only witnesses of a few seconds of brief totality were the "Gang of Nine" eclipse chasers aboard a plane at an altitude of 40,000 feet. The eclipse did not even appear as total due to irregularities in the lunar limb.

The eclipse also resulted in litigation involving a Florida fourth grader whose eyes were allegedly damaged when he viewed the partial eclipse on school grounds. A lower court had dismissed the case on the grounds that the school had no duty to supervise the child after school hours. However, the Florida Court of Appeals ruled in 1994 that the jury instruction on that question was improper, and remanded the case.

== Eclipse details ==
Shown below are two tables displaying details about this particular solar eclipse. The first table outlines times at which the Moon's penumbra or umbra attains the specific parameter, and the second table describes various other parameters pertaining to this eclipse.

October 3, 1986 Solar Eclipse Times
Event	Time (UTC)
First Penumbral External Contact	1986 October 3 at 16:58:20.8 UTC
Equatorial Conjunction	1986 October 3 at 18:07:22.2 UTC
Ecliptic Conjunction	1986 October 3 at 18:55:40.6 UTC
First Umbral External Contact	1986 October 3 at 18:55:55.1 UTC
First Central Line	1986 October 3 at 18:56:25.6 UTC
Greatest Duration	1986 October 3 at 18:56:25.6 UTC
First Umbral Internal Contact	1986 October 3 at 18:56:57.6 UTC
Greatest Eclipse	1986 October 3 at 19:06:15.0 UTC
Last Umbral Internal Contact	1986 October 3 at 19:16:11.3 UTC
Last Central Line	1986 October 3 at 19:16:40.7 UTC
Last Umbral External Contact	1986 October 3 at 19:17:08.5 UTC
Last Penumbral External Contact	1986 October 3 at 21:14:27.6 UTC

October 3, 1986 Solar Eclipse Parameters
Parameter	Value
Eclipse Magnitude	1.00002
Eclipse Obscuration	1.00004
Gamma	0.99305
Sun Right Ascension	12h37m45.8s
Sun Declination	-04°04'06.7"
Sun Semi-Diameter	15'59.2"
Sun Equatorial Horizontal Parallax	08.8"
Moon Right Ascension	12h39m37.6s
Moon Declination	-03°13'11.4"
Moon Semi-Diameter	15'58.2"
Moon Equatorial Horizontal Parallax	0°58'36.8"
ΔT	55.2 s

== Eclipse season ==
This eclipse is part of an eclipse season, a period, roughly every six months, when eclipses occur. Only two (or occasionally three) eclipse seasons occur each year, and each season lasts about 35 days and repeats just short of six months (173 days) later; thus two full eclipse seasons always occur each year. Either two or three eclipses happen each eclipse season. In the sequence below, each eclipse is separated by a fortnight.

Eclipse season of October 1986
October 3 Descending node (new moon)	October 17 Ascending node (full moon)
Hybrid solar eclipse Solar Saros 124	Total lunar eclipse Lunar Saros 136

== Related eclipses ==
=== Eclipses in 1986 ===
- A partial solar eclipse on April 9.
- A total lunar eclipse on April 24.
- A hybrid solar eclipse on October 3.
- A total lunar eclipse on October 17.

=== Metonic ===
- Preceded by: Solar eclipse of December 15, 1982
- Followed by: Solar eclipse of July 22, 1990

=== Tzolkinex ===
- Preceded by: Solar eclipse of August 22, 1979
- Followed by: Solar eclipse of November 13, 1993

=== Half-Saros ===
- Preceded by: Lunar eclipse of September 27, 1977
- Followed by: Lunar eclipse of October 8, 1995

=== Tritos ===
- Preceded by: Solar eclipse of November 3, 1975
- Followed by: Solar eclipse of September 2, 1997

=== Solar Saros 124 ===
- Preceded by: Solar eclipse of September 22, 1968
- Followed by: Solar eclipse of October 14, 2004

=== Inex ===
- Preceded by: Solar eclipse of October 23, 1957
- Followed by: Solar eclipse of September 13, 2015

=== Triad ===
- Preceded by: Solar eclipse of December 3, 1899
- Followed by: Solar eclipse of August 3, 2073

=== Solar eclipses of 1986–1989 ===
This eclipse is a member of a semester series. An eclipse in a semester series of solar eclipses repeats approximately every 177 days and 4 hours (a semester) at alternating nodes of the Moon's orbit.

Solar eclipse series sets from 1986 to 1989
Ascending node			Descending node		
Saros	Map	Gamma	Saros	Map	Gamma
119	April 9, 1986 Partial	−1.0822	124	October 3, 1986 Hybrid	0.9931
129	March 29, 1987 Hybrid	−0.3053	134	September 23, 1987 Annular	0.2787
139	March 18, 1988 Total	0.4188	144	September 11, 1988 Annular	−0.4681
149	March 7, 1989 Partial	1.0981	154	August 31, 1989 Partial	−1.1928

=== Saros 124 ===
This eclipse is a part of Saros series 124, repeating every 18 years, 11 days, and containing 73 events. The series started with a partial solar eclipse on March 6, 1049. It contains total eclipses from June 12, 1211 through September 22, 1968, and a hybrid eclipse on October 3, 1986. There are no annular eclipses in this set. The series ends at member 73 as a partial eclipse on May 11, 2347. Its eclipses are tabulated in three columns; every third eclipse in the same column is one exeligmos apart, so they all cast shadows over approximately the same parts of the Earth.

The longest duration of totality was produced by member 39 at 5 minutes, 46 seconds on May 3, 1734. All eclipses in this series occur at the Moon’s descending node of orbit.

Series members 43–64 occur between 1801 and 2200:
43	44	45
June 16, 1806	June 26, 1824	July 8, 1842
46	47	48
July 18, 1860	July 29, 1878	August 9, 1896
49	50	51
August 21, 1914	August 31, 1932	September 12, 1950
52	53	54
September 22, 1968	October 3, 1986	October 14, 2004
55	56	57
October 25, 2022	November 4, 2040	November 16, 2058
58	59	60
November 26, 2076	December 7, 2094	December 19, 2112
61	62	63
December 30, 2130	January 9, 2149	January 21, 2167
64
January 31, 2185

=== Metonic series ===
The metonic series repeats eclipses every 19 years (6939.69 days), lasting about 5 cycles. Eclipses occur in nearly the same calendar date. In addition, the octon subseries repeats 1/5 of that or every 3.8 years (1387.94 days). All eclipses in this table occur at the Moon's descending node.

21 eclipse events between July 22, 1971 and July 22, 2047
July 22	May 9–11	February 26–27	December 14–15	October 2–3
116	118	120	122	124
July 22, 1971	May 11, 1975	February 26, 1979	December 15, 1982	October 3, 1986
126	128	130	132	134
July 22, 1990	May 10, 1994	February 26, 1998	December 14, 2001	October 3, 2005
136	138	140	142	144
July 22, 2009	May 10, 2013	February 26, 2017	December 14, 2020	October 2, 2024
146	148	150	152	154
July 22, 2028	May 9, 2032	February 27, 2036	December 15, 2039	October 3, 2043
156
July 22, 2047

=== Tritos series ===
This eclipse is a part of a tritos cycle, repeating at alternating nodes every 135 synodic months (≈ 3986.63 days, or 11 years minus 1 month). Their appearance and longitude are irregular due to a lack of synchronization with the anomalistic month (period of perigee), but groupings of 3 tritos cycles (≈ 33 years minus 3 months) come close (≈ 434.044 anomalistic months), so eclipses are similar in these groupings.

Series members between 1801 and 2200
March 14, 1801 (Saros 107)	February 12, 1812 (Saros 108)	January 12, 1823 (Saros 109)		November 10, 1844 (Saros 111)
		August 9, 1877 (Saros 114)	July 9, 1888 (Saros 115)	June 8, 1899 (Saros 116)
May 9, 1910 (Saros 117)	April 8, 1921 (Saros 118)	March 7, 1932 (Saros 119)	February 4, 1943 (Saros 120)	January 5, 1954 (Saros 121)
December 4, 1964 (Saros 122)	November 3, 1975 (Saros 123)	October 3, 1986 (Saros 124)	September 2, 1997 (Saros 125)	August 1, 2008 (Saros 126)
July 2, 2019 (Saros 127)	June 1, 2030 (Saros 128)	April 30, 2041 (Saros 129)	March 30, 2052 (Saros 130)	February 28, 2063 (Saros 131)
January 27, 2074 (Saros 132)	December 27, 2084 (Saros 133)	November 27, 2095 (Saros 134)	October 26, 2106 (Saros 135)	September 26, 2117 (Saros 136)
August 25, 2128 (Saros 137)	July 25, 2139 (Saros 138)	June 25, 2150 (Saros 139)	May 25, 2161 (Saros 140)	April 23, 2172 (Saros 141)
March 23, 2183 (Saros 142)	February 21, 2194 (Saros 143)			

=== Inex series ===
This eclipse is a part of the long period inex cycle, repeating at alternating nodes, every 358 synodic months (≈ 10,571.95 days, or 29 years minus 20 days). Their appearance and longitude are irregular due to a lack of synchronization with the anomalistic month (period of perigee). However, groupings of 3 inex cycles (≈ 87 years minus 2 months) comes close (≈ 1,151.02 anomalistic months), so eclipses are similar in these groupings.

Series members between 1801 and 2200
February 1, 1813 (Saros 118)	January 11, 1842 (Saros 119)	December 22, 1870 (Saros 120)
December 3, 1899 (Saros 121)	November 12, 1928 (Saros 122)	October 23, 1957 (Saros 123)
October 3, 1986 (Saros 124)	September 13, 2015 (Saros 125)	August 23, 2044 (Saros 126)
August 3, 2073 (Saros 127)	July 15, 2102 (Saros 128)	June 25, 2131 (Saros 129)
June 4, 2160 (Saros 130)	May 15, 2189 (Saros 131)	
