= Solar eclipse of September 12, 1950 =

Total eclipse

- Total eclipse
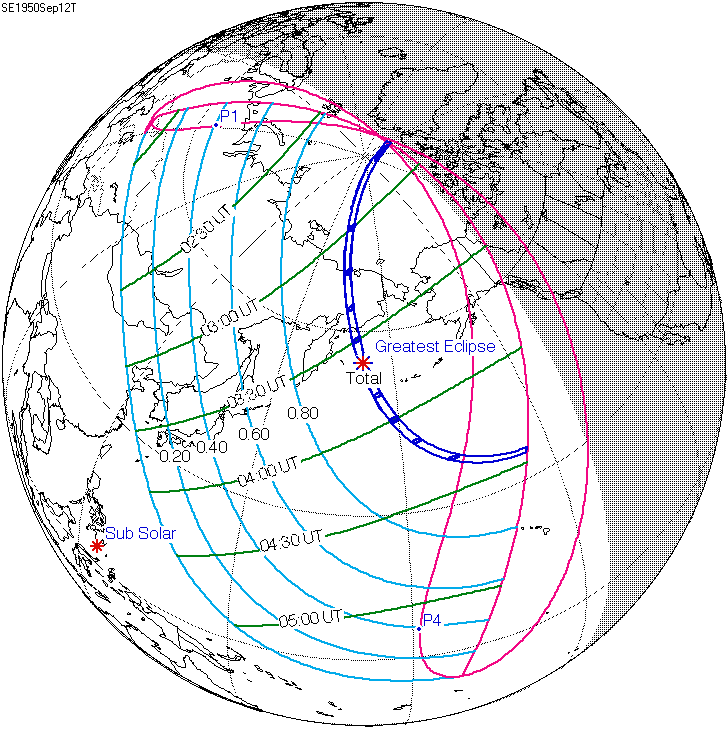
- Map
- Gamma: 0.8903
- Magnitude: 1.0182

Maximum eclipse
- Duration: 74 s (1 min 14 s)
- Coordinates: 54.8°N 172.3°E
- Max. width of band: 134 km (83 mi)

Times (UTC)
- Greatest eclipse: 3:38:47

References
- Saros: 124 (51 of 73)
- Catalog # (SE5000): 9399

A total solar eclipse occurred at the Moon's descending node of orbit between Monday, September 11, 1950 and Tuesday, September 12, 1950, with a magnitude of 1.0182. A solar eclipse occurs when the Moon passes between Earth and the Sun, thereby totally or partly obscuring the image of the Sun for a viewer on Earth. A total solar eclipse occurs when the Moon's apparent diameter is larger than the Sun's, blocking all direct sunlight, turning day into darkness. Totality occurs in a narrow path across Earth's surface, with the partial solar eclipse visible over a surrounding region thousands of kilometres wide. Occurring about 3.2 days before perigee (on September 15, 1950, at 8:20 UTC), the Moon's apparent diameter was larger.

Totality was visible from eastern Soviet Union (today's Russia) on September 12 local time and the whole Semichi Islands in Alaska on September 11 local time. A partial eclipse was visible for parts of Northeast Asia, Alaska, Hawaii, and northwest Canada.

== Eclipse details ==
Shown below are two tables displaying details about this particular solar eclipse. The first table outlines times at which the Moon's penumbra or umbra attains the specific parameter, and the second table describes various other parameters pertaining to this eclipse.

September 12, 1950 Solar Eclipse Times
Event	Time (UTC)
First Penumbral External Contact	1950 September 12 at 01:23:43.1 UTC
Equatorial Conjunction	1950 September 12 at 02:46:30.5 UTC
First Umbral External Contact	1950 September 12 at 02:50:01.6 UTC
First Central Line	1950 September 12 at 02:50:40.3 UTC
First Umbral Internal Contact	1950 September 12 at 02:51:19.4 UTC
Ecliptic Conjunction	1950 September 12 at 03:29:21.7 UTC
Greatest Eclipse	1950 September 12 at 03:38:46.9 UTC
Greatest Duration	1950 September 12 at 03:40:16.3 UTC
Last Umbral Internal Contact	1950 September 12 at 04:26:44.1 UTC
Last Central Line	1950 September 12 at 04:27:25.6 UTC
Last Umbral External Contact	1950 September 12 at 04:28:06.7 UTC
Last Penumbral External Contact	1950 September 12 at 05:54:06.6 UTC

September 12, 1950 Solar Eclipse Parameters
Parameter	Value
Eclipse Magnitude	1.01818
Eclipse Obscuration	1.03668
Gamma	0.89030
Sun Right Ascension	11h18m51.6s
Sun Declination	+04°25'42.1"
Sun Semi-Diameter	15'53.5"
Sun Equatorial Horizontal Parallax	08.7"
Moon Right Ascension	11h20m32.5s
Moon Declination	+05°11'38.3"
Moon Semi-Diameter	16'04.0"
Moon Equatorial Horizontal Parallax	0°58'57.9"
ΔT	29.4 s

== Eclipse season ==
This eclipse is part of an eclipse season, a period, roughly every six months, when eclipses occur. Only two (or occasionally three) eclipse seasons occur each year, and each season lasts about 35 days and repeats just short of six months (173 days) later; thus two full eclipse seasons always occur each year. Either two or three eclipses happen each eclipse season. In the sequence below, each eclipse is separated by a fortnight.

Eclipse season of September 1950
September 12 Descending node (new moon)	September 26 Ascending node (full moon)
Total solar eclipse Solar Saros 124	Total lunar eclipse Lunar Saros 136

== Related eclipses ==
=== Eclipses in 1950 ===
- A non-central annular solar eclipse on March 18.
- A total lunar eclipse on April 2.
- A total solar eclipse on September 12.
- A total lunar eclipse on September 26.

=== Metonic ===
- Preceded by: Solar eclipse of November 23, 1946
- Followed by: Solar eclipse of June 30, 1954

=== Tzolkinex ===
- Preceded by: Solar eclipse of August 1, 1943
- Followed by: Solar eclipse of October 23, 1957

=== Half-Saros ===
- Preceded by: Lunar eclipse of September 5, 1941
- Followed by: Lunar eclipse of September 17, 1959

=== Tritos ===
- Preceded by: Solar eclipse of October 12, 1939
- Followed by: Solar eclipse of August 11, 1961

=== Solar Saros 124 ===
- Preceded by: Solar eclipse of August 31, 1932
- Followed by: Solar eclipse of September 22, 1968

=== Inex ===
- Preceded by: Solar eclipse of October 1, 1921
- Followed by: Solar eclipse of August 22, 1979

=== Triad ===
- Preceded by: Solar eclipse of November 11, 1863
- Followed by: Solar eclipse of July 13, 2037

=== Solar eclipses of 1950–1953 ===
This eclipse is a member of a semester series. An eclipse in a semester series of solar eclipses repeats approximately every 177 days and 4 hours (a semester) at alternating nodes of the Moon's orbit.

The partial solar eclipse on July 11, 1953 occurs in the next lunar year eclipse set.

Solar eclipse series sets from 1950 to 1953
Ascending node			Descending node		
Saros	Map	Gamma	Saros	Map	Gamma
119	March 18, 1950 Annular (non-central)	0.9988	124	September 12, 1950 Total	0.8903
129	March 7, 1951 Annular	−0.242	134	September 1, 1951 Annular	0.1557
139	February 25, 1952 Total	0.4697	144	August 20, 1952 Annular	−0.6102
149	February 14, 1953 Partial	1.1331	154	August 9, 1953 Partial	−1.344

=== Saros 124 ===
This eclipse is a part of Saros series 124, repeating every 18 years, 11 days, and containing 73 events. The series started with a partial solar eclipse on March 6, 1049. It contains total eclipses from June 12, 1211 through September 22, 1968, and a hybrid eclipse on October 3, 1986. There are no annular eclipses in this set. The series ends at member 73 as a partial eclipse on May 11, 2347. Its eclipses are tabulated in three columns; every third eclipse in the same column is one exeligmos apart, so they all cast shadows over approximately the same parts of the Earth.

The longest duration of totality was produced by member 39 at 5 minutes, 46 seconds on May 3, 1734. All eclipses in this series occur at the Moon’s descending node of orbit.

Series members 43–64 occur between 1801 and 2200:
43	44	45
June 16, 1806	June 26, 1824	July 8, 1842
46	47	48
July 18, 1860	July 29, 1878	August 9, 1896
49	50	51
August 21, 1914	August 31, 1932	September 12, 1950
52	53	54
September 22, 1968	October 3, 1986	October 14, 2004
55	56	57
October 25, 2022	November 4, 2040	November 16, 2058
58	59	60
November 26, 2076	December 7, 2094	December 19, 2112
61	62	63
December 30, 2130	January 9, 2149	January 21, 2167
64
January 31, 2185

=== Metonic series ===
The metonic series repeats eclipses every 19 years (6939.69 days), lasting about 5 cycles. Eclipses occur in nearly the same calendar date. In addition, the octon subseries repeats 1/5 of that or every 3.8 years (1387.94 days). All eclipses in this table occur at the Moon's descending node.

22 eclipse events between September 12, 1931 and July 1, 2011
September 11–12	June 30–July 1	April 17–19	February 4–5	November 22–23
114	116	118	120	122
September 12, 1931	June 30, 1935	April 19, 1939	February 4, 1943	November 23, 1946
124	126	128	130	132
September 12, 1950	June 30, 1954	April 19, 1958	February 5, 1962	November 23, 1965
134	136	138	140	142
September 11, 1969	June 30, 1973	April 18, 1977	February 4, 1981	November 22, 1984
144	146	148	150	152
September 11, 1988	June 30, 1992	April 17, 1996	February 5, 2000	November 23, 2003
154	156			
September 11, 2007	July 1, 2011			

=== Tritos series ===
This eclipse is a part of a tritos cycle, repeating at alternating nodes every 135 synodic months (≈ 3986.63 days, or 11 years minus 1 month). Their appearance and longitude are irregular due to a lack of synchronization with the anomalistic month (period of perigee), but groupings of 3 tritos cycles (≈ 33 years minus 3 months) come close (≈ 434.044 anomalistic months), so eclipses are similar in these groupings.

Series members between 1801 and 2200
October 19, 1808 (Saros 111)	September 19, 1819 (Saros 112)	August 18, 1830 (Saros 113)	July 18, 1841 (Saros 114)	June 17, 1852 (Saros 115)
May 17, 1863 (Saros 116)	April 16, 1874 (Saros 117)	March 16, 1885 (Saros 118)	February 13, 1896 (Saros 119)	January 14, 1907 (Saros 120)
December 14, 1917 (Saros 121)	November 12, 1928 (Saros 122)	October 12, 1939 (Saros 123)	September 12, 1950 (Saros 124)	August 11, 1961 (Saros 125)
July 10, 1972 (Saros 126)	June 11, 1983 (Saros 127)	May 10, 1994 (Saros 128)	April 8, 2005 (Saros 129)	March 9, 2016 (Saros 130)
February 6, 2027 (Saros 131)	January 5, 2038 (Saros 132)	December 5, 2048 (Saros 133)	November 5, 2059 (Saros 134)	October 4, 2070 (Saros 135)
September 3, 2081 (Saros 136)	August 3, 2092 (Saros 137)	July 4, 2103 (Saros 138)	June 3, 2114 (Saros 139)	May 3, 2125 (Saros 140)
April 1, 2136 (Saros 141)	March 2, 2147 (Saros 142)	January 30, 2158 (Saros 143)	December 29, 2168 (Saros 144)	November 28, 2179 (Saros 145)
October 29, 2190 (Saros 146)

=== Inex series ===
This eclipse is a part of the long period inex cycle, repeating at alternating nodes, every 358 synodic months (≈ 10,571.95 days, or 29 years minus 20 days). Their appearance and longitude are irregular due to a lack of synchronization with the anomalistic month (period of perigee). However, groupings of 3 inex cycles (≈ 87 years minus 2 months) comes close (≈ 1,151.02 anomalistic months), so eclipses are similar in these groupings.

Series members between 1801 and 2200
December 21, 1805 (Saros 119)	November 30, 1834 (Saros 120)	November 11, 1863 (Saros 121)
October 20, 1892 (Saros 122)	October 1, 1921 (Saros 123)	September 12, 1950 (Saros 124)
August 22, 1979 (Saros 125)	August 1, 2008 (Saros 126)	July 13, 2037 (Saros 127)
June 22, 2066 (Saros 128)	June 2, 2095 (Saros 129)	May 14, 2124 (Saros 130)
April 23, 2153 (Saros 131)	April 3, 2182 (Saros 132)	
