= Solar eclipse of November 26, 2076 =

Future partial solar eclipse

- Partial eclipse
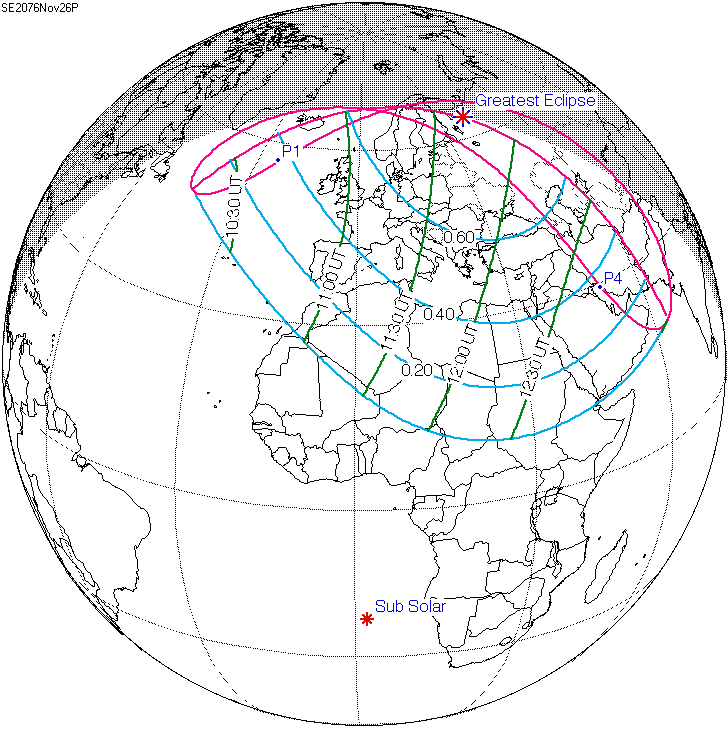
- Map
- Gamma: 1.1401
- Magnitude: 0.7315

Maximum eclipse
- Coordinates: 63.7°N 40.1°E

Times (UTC)
- Greatest eclipse: 11:43:01

References
- Saros: 124 (58 of 73)
- Catalog # (SE5000): 9680

A partial solar eclipse will occur at the Moon's descending node of orbit on Thursday, November 26, 2076, with a magnitude of 0.7315. A solar eclipse occurs when the Moon passes between Earth and the Sun, thereby totally or partly obscuring the image of the Sun for a viewer on Earth. A partial solar eclipse occurs in the polar regions of the Earth when the center of the Moon's shadow misses the Earth.

This will be the last of four solar eclipses in 2076, with the others occurring on January 6, June 1, and July 1.

The partial solar eclipse will be visible for parts of Greenland, northern Canada, Alaska, and the Russian Far East.

== Eclipse details ==
Shown below are two tables displaying details about this particular solar eclipse. The first table outlines times at which the Moon's penumbra or umbra attains the specific parameter, and the second table describes various other parameters pertaining to this eclipse.

November 26, 2076 Solar Eclipse Times
Event	Time (UTC)
First Penumbral External Contact	2076 November 26 at 09:46:54.5 UTC
Equatorial Conjunction	2076 November 26 at 11:07:03.6 UTC
Ecliptic Conjunction	2076 November 26 at 11:30:38.9 UTC
Greatest Eclipse	2076 November 26 at 11:43:00.9 UTC
Last Penumbral External Contact	2076 November 26 at 13:39:16.9 UTC

November 26, 2076 Solar Eclipse Parameters
Parameter	Value
Eclipse Magnitude	0.73147
Eclipse Obscuration	0.65559
Gamma	1.14014
Sun Right Ascension	16h12m39.7s
Sun Declination	-21°08'26.9"
Sun Semi-Diameter	16'12.3"
Sun Equatorial Horizontal Parallax	08.9"
Moon Right Ascension	16h13m56.6s
Moon Declination	-20°05'16.9"
Moon Semi-Diameter	15'44.2"
Moon Equatorial Horizontal Parallax	0°57'45.3"
ΔT	102.9 s

== Eclipse season ==
This eclipse is part of an eclipse season, a period, roughly every six months, when eclipses occur. Only two (or occasionally three) eclipse seasons occur each year, and each season lasts about 35 days and repeats just short of six months (173 days) later; thus two full eclipse seasons always occur each year. Either two or three eclipses happen each eclipse season. In the sequence below, each eclipse is separated by a fortnight.

Eclipse season of November–December 2076
November 26 Descending node (new moon)	December 10 Ascending node (full moon)
Partial solar eclipse Solar Saros 124	Total lunar eclipse Lunar Saros 136

== Related eclipses ==
=== Eclipses in 2076 ===
- A total solar eclipse on January 6.
- A partial solar eclipse on June 1.
- A total lunar eclipse on June 17.
- A partial solar eclipse on July 1.
- A partial solar eclipse on November 26.
- A total lunar eclipse on December 10.

=== Metonic ===
- Preceded by: Solar eclipse of February 7, 2073
- Followed by: Solar eclipse of September 13, 2080

=== Tzolkinex ===
- Preceded by: Solar eclipse of October 15, 2069
- Followed by: Solar eclipse of January 7, 2084

=== Half-Saros ===
- Preceded by: Lunar eclipse of November 21, 2067
- Followed by: Lunar eclipse of December 1, 2085

=== Tritos ===
- Preceded by: Solar eclipse of December 27, 2065
- Followed by: Solar eclipse of October 26, 2087

=== Solar Saros 124 ===
- Preceded by: Solar eclipse of November 16, 2058
- Followed by: Solar eclipse of December 7, 2094

=== Inex ===
- Preceded by: Solar eclipse of December 16, 2047
- Followed by: Solar eclipse of November 6, 2105

=== Triad ===
- Preceded by: Solar eclipse of January 26, 1990
- Followed by: Solar eclipse of September 28, 2163

=== Solar eclipses of 2076–2079 ===
This eclipse is a member of a semester series. An eclipse in a semester series of solar eclipses repeats approximately every 177 days and 4 hours (a semester) at alternating nodes of the Moon's orbit.

The partial solar eclipses on January 6, 2076 and July 1, 2076 occur in the previous lunar year eclipse set.

Solar eclipse series sets from 2076 to 2079
Ascending node			Descending node		
Saros	Map	Gamma	Saros	Map	Gamma
119	June 1, 2076 Partial	−1.3897	124	November 26, 2076 Partial	1.1401
129	May 22, 2077 Total	−0.5725	134	November 15, 2077 Annular	0.4705
139	May 11, 2078 Total	0.1838	144	November 4, 2078 Annular	−0.2285
149	May 1, 2079 Total	0.9081	154	October 24, 2079 Annular	−0.9243

=== Saros 124 ===
This eclipse is a part of Saros series 124, repeating every 18 years, 11 days, and containing 73 events. The series started with a partial solar eclipse on March 6, 1049. It contains total eclipses from June 12, 1211 through September 22, 1968, and a hybrid eclipse on October 3, 1986. There are no annular eclipses in this set. The series ends at member 73 as a partial eclipse on May 11, 2347. Its eclipses are tabulated in three columns; every third eclipse in the same column is one exeligmos apart, so they all cast shadows over approximately the same parts of the Earth.

The longest duration of totality was produced by member 39 at 5 minutes, 46 seconds on May 3, 1734. All eclipses in this series occur at the Moon’s descending node of orbit.

Series members 43–64 occur between 1801 and 2200:
43	44	45
June 16, 1806	June 26, 1824	July 8, 1842
46	47	48
July 18, 1860	July 29, 1878	August 9, 1896
49	50	51
August 21, 1914	August 31, 1932	September 12, 1950
52	53	54
September 22, 1968	October 3, 1986	October 14, 2004
55	56	57
October 25, 2022	November 4, 2040	November 16, 2058
58	59	60
November 26, 2076	December 7, 2094	December 19, 2112
61	62	63
December 30, 2130	January 9, 2149	January 21, 2167
64
January 31, 2185

=== Metonic series ===
The metonic series repeats eclipses every 19 years (6939.69 days), lasting about 5 cycles. Eclipses occur in nearly the same calendar date. In addition, the octon subseries repeats 1/5 of that or every 3.8 years (1387.94 days). All eclipses in this table occur at the Moon's descending node.

22 eclipse events between July 3, 2065 and November 26, 2152
July 3–4	April 21–23	February 7–8	November 26–27	September 13–15
118	120	122	124	126
July 3, 2065	April 21, 2069	February 7, 2073	November 26, 2076	September 13, 2080
128	130	132	134	136
July 3, 2084	April 21, 2088	February 7, 2092	November 27, 2095	September 14, 2099
138	140	142	144	146
July 4, 2103	April 23, 2107	February 8, 2111	November 27, 2114	September 15, 2118
148	150	152	154	156
July 4, 2122	April 22, 2126	February 8, 2130	November 26, 2133	September 15, 2137
158	160	162	164	
July 3, 2141			November 26, 2152	

=== Tritos series ===
This eclipse is a part of a tritos cycle, repeating at alternating nodes every 135 synodic months (≈ 3986.63 days, or 11 years minus 1 month). Their appearance and longitude are irregular due to a lack of synchronization with the anomalistic month (period of perigee), but groupings of 3 tritos cycles (≈ 33 years minus 3 months) come close (≈ 434.044 anomalistic months), so eclipses are similar in these groupings.

The partial solar eclipses on April 8, 1902 (part of Saros 108) and January 5, 1935 (part of Saros 111) are also a part of this series but are not included in the table below.

Series members between 2000 and 2200
July 1, 2000 (Saros 117)	June 1, 2011 (Saros 118)	April 30, 2022 (Saros 119)	March 30, 2033 (Saros 120)	February 28, 2044 (Saros 121)
January 27, 2055 (Saros 122)	December 27, 2065 (Saros 123)	November 26, 2076 (Saros 124)	October 26, 2087 (Saros 125)	September 25, 2098 (Saros 126)
August 26, 2109 (Saros 127)	July 25, 2120 (Saros 128)	June 25, 2131 (Saros 129)	May 25, 2142 (Saros 130)	April 23, 2153 (Saros 131)
March 23, 2164 (Saros 132)	February 21, 2175 (Saros 133)	January 20, 2186 (Saros 134)	December 19, 2196 (Saros 135)	

=== Inex series ===
This eclipse is a part of the long period inex cycle, repeating at alternating nodes, every 358 synodic months (≈ 10,571.95 days, or 29 years minus 20 days). Their appearance and longitude are irregular due to a lack of synchronization with the anomalistic month (period of perigee). However, groupings of 3 inex cycles (≈ 87 years minus 2 months) comes close (≈ 1,151.02 anomalistic months), so eclipses are similar in these groupings.

Series members between 1801 and 2200
May 27, 1816 (Saros 115)	May 6, 1845 (Saros 116)	April 16, 1874 (Saros 117)
March 29, 1903 (Saros 118)	March 7, 1932 (Saros 119)	February 15, 1961 (Saros 120)
January 26, 1990 (Saros 121)	January 6, 2019 (Saros 122)	December 16, 2047 (Saros 123)
November 26, 2076 (Saros 124)	November 6, 2105 (Saros 125)	October 17, 2134 (Saros 126)
September 28, 2163 (Saros 127)	September 6, 2192 (Saros 128)	
