= Solar Saros 124 =

Saros cycle series 124 for solar eclipses

Saros 124

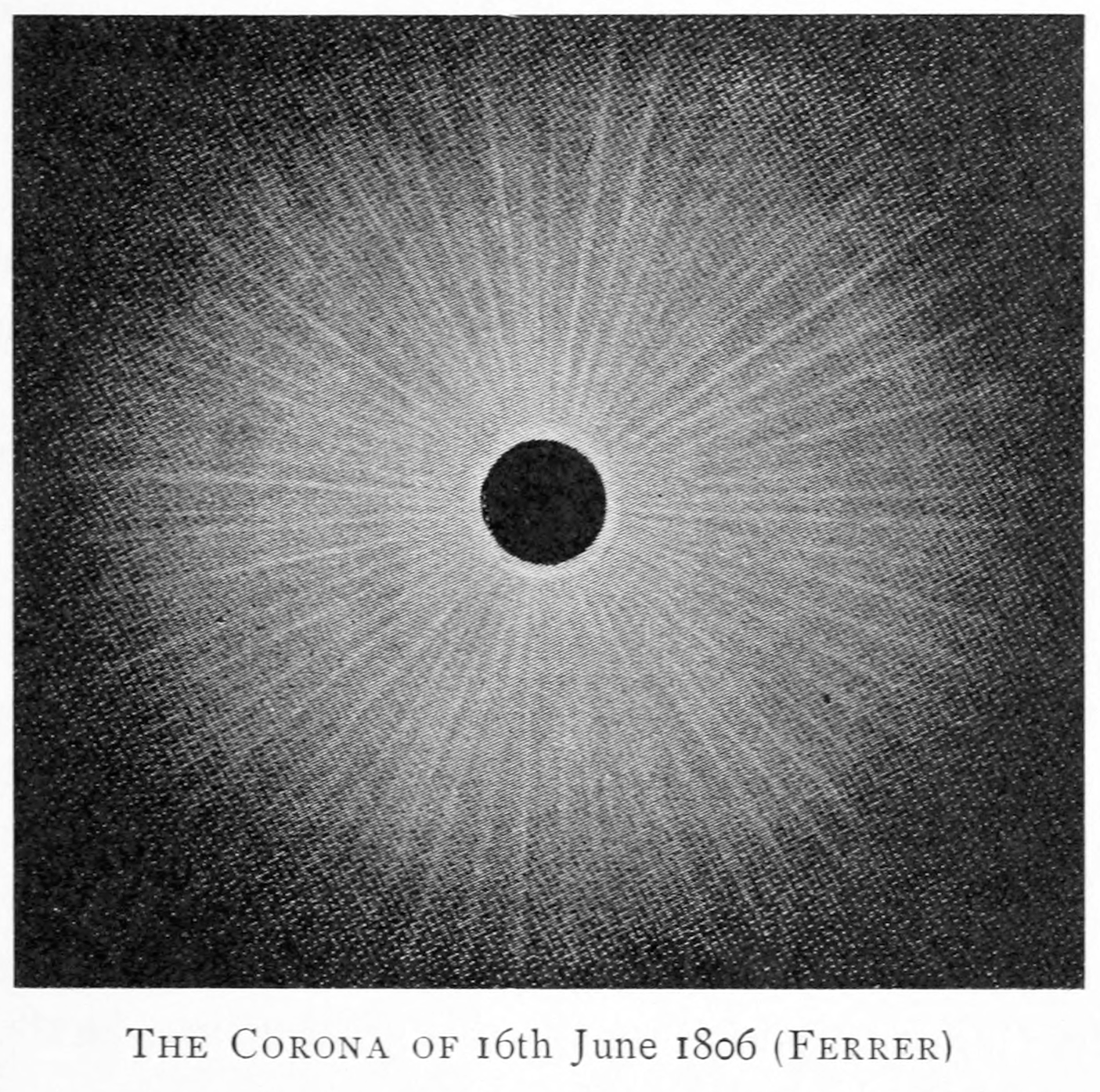
June 16, 1806 Series member 43

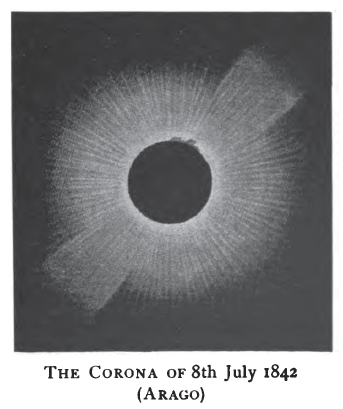
July 8, 1842 Series member 45

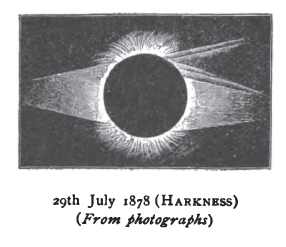
July 29, 1878 Series member 47

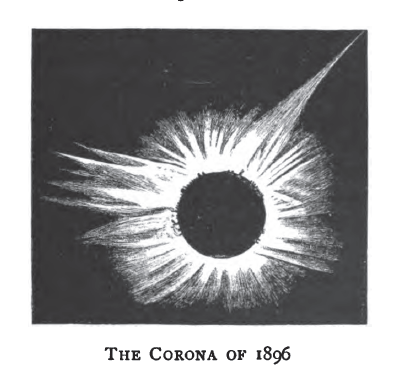
August 9, 1896 Series member 48

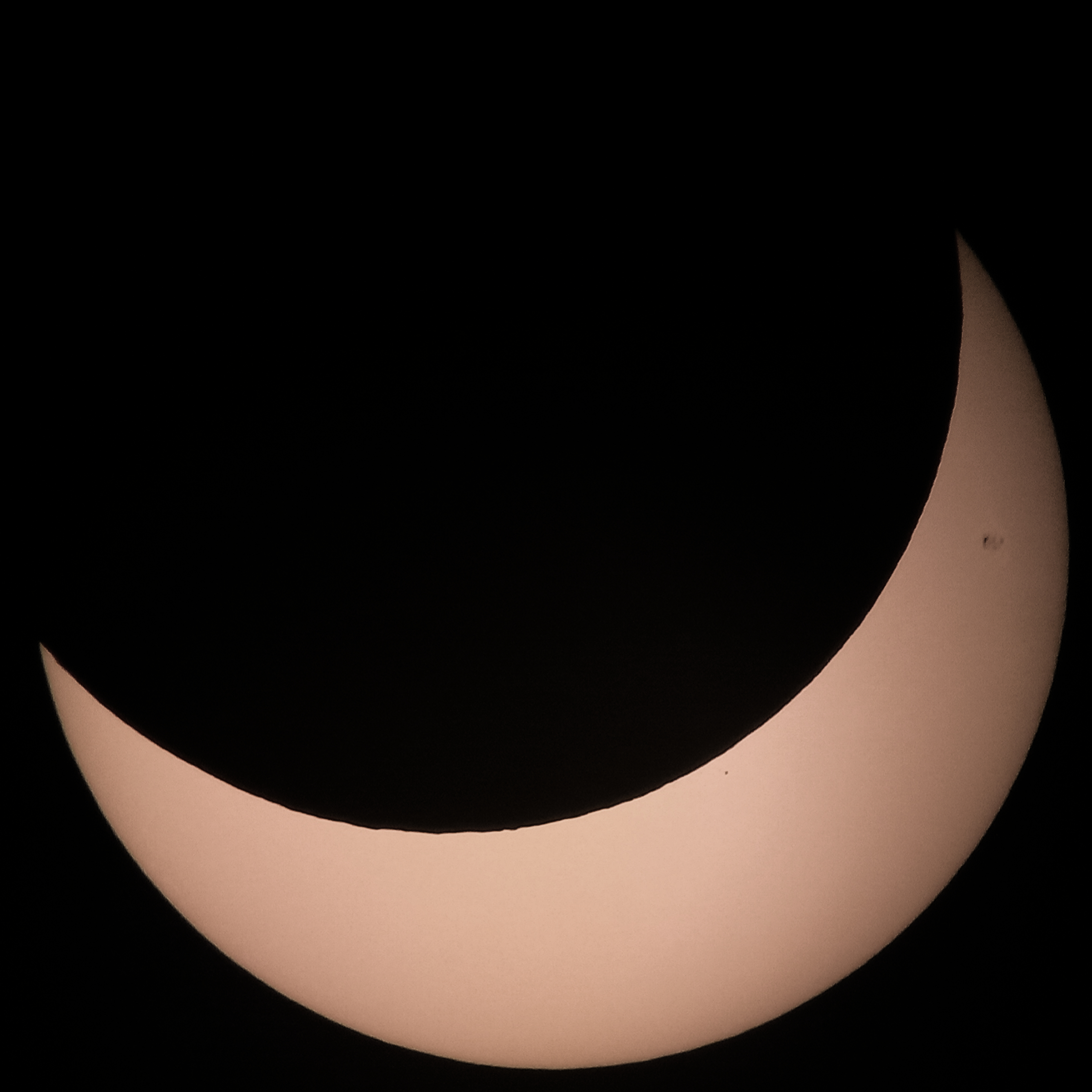
October 25, 2022 Series member 55

Saros cycle series 124 for solar eclipses occurs at the Moon's descending node, repeating every 18 years, 11 days, containing 73 eclipses, 44 of which are umbral (43 total and 1 hybrid). The first eclipse in the series was on 6 March 1049 and the last will be on 11 May 2347. The most recent eclipse was a partial eclipse on 25 October 2022 and the next will be a partial eclipse on 4 November 2040.

The longest totality was 5 minutes 46 seconds on 3 May 1734.

This solar saros is linked to Lunar Saros 117.

== Umbral eclipses ==
Umbral eclipses (annular, total and hybrid) can be further classified as either: 1) Central (two limits), 2) Central (one limit) or 3) Non-Central (one limit). The statistical distribution of these classes in Saros series 124 appears in the following table.

Classification	Number	Percent
All Umbral eclipses	44	100.00%
Central (two limits)	44	100.00%
Central (one limit)	0	0.00%
Non-central (one limit)	0	0.00%

== All eclipses ==
Note: Dates are given in the Julian calendar prior to 15 October 1582, and in the Gregorian calendar after that.

Saros	Member	Date	Time (Greatest) UTC	Type	Location Lat, Long	Gamma	Mag.	Width (km)	Duration (min:sec)	Ref
124	1	March 6, 1049	16:00:57	Partial	71.9S 47.7E	-1.5374	0.0138			
124	2	March 17, 1067	23:50:58	Partial	71.9S 84.3W	-1.4938	0.0904			
124	3	March 28, 1085	7:34:42	Partial	71.8S 145.3E	-1.4444	0.179			
124	4	April 8, 1103	15:12:10	Partial	71.4S 16.9E	-1.389	0.2797			
124	5	April 18, 1121	22:43:16	Partial	70.7S 109.5W	-1.3276	0.3929			
124	6	April 30, 1139	6:10:02	Partial	70S 125.8E	-1.2616	0.5159			
124	7	May 10, 1157	13:32:54	Partial	69.1S 2.6E	-1.1912	0.6486			
124	8	May 21, 1175	20:53:01	Partial	68.1S 119.3W	-1.1176	0.7882			
124	9	June 1, 1193	4:11:37	Partial	67.1S 119.8E	-1.0418	0.9331			
124	10	June 12, 1211	11:30:10	Total	51.7S 3.4E	-0.9649	1.0434	569	3m 20s	
124	11	June 22, 1229	18:50:32	Total	39S 109.7W	-0.8886	1.0496	360	4m 10s	
124	12	July 4, 1247	2:11:47	Total	30.9S 137.9E	-0.8122	1.0539	304	4m 42s	
124	13	July 14, 1265	9:37:31	Total	25.3S 25.1E	-0.7388	1.0568	275	4m 59s	
124	14	July 25, 1283	17:06:40	Total	21.4S 88.1W	-0.6677	1.0587	256	5m 7s	
124	15	August 5, 1301	0:42:42	Total	19.1S 157.3E	-0.6019	1.0597	242	5m 7s	
124	16	August 16, 1319	8:23:22	Total	18S 41.9E	-0.5396	1.06	231	5m 1s	
124	17	August 26, 1337	16:12:58	Total	18.1S 75.7W	-0.4842	1.0596	221	4m 53s	
124	18	September 7, 1355	0:09:07	Total	19.2S 165.3E	-0.434	1.0586	212	4m 43s	
124	19	September 17, 1373	8:14:16	Total	21S 44E	-0.3912	1.0573	204	4m 33s	
124	20	September 28, 1391	16:26:31	Total	23.4S 78.9W	-0.3541	1.0557	195	4m 23s	
124	21	October 9, 1409	0:48:09	Total	26.2S 156.1E	-0.3249	1.0539	188	4m 15s	
124	22	October 20, 1427	9:16:36	Total	29.1S 29.6E	-0.3009	1.0521	180	4m 7s	
124	23	October 30, 1445	17:52:12	Total	32S 98.2W	-0.2828	1.0505	174	4m 1s	
124	24	November 11, 1463	2:33:46	Total	34.5S 133E	-0.2696	1.049	169	3m 56s	
124	25	November 21, 1481	11:21:13	Total	36.6S 3.3E	-0.2617	1.0479	165	3m 53s	
124	26	December 2, 1499	20:11:32	Total	37.9S 126.7W	-0.2557	1.0471	162	3m 51s	
124	27	December 13, 1517	5:04:13	Total	38.2S 103E	-0.252	1.0468	161	3m 52s	
124	28	December 24, 1535	13:56:57	Total	37.5S 27.4W	-0.2482	1.0469	161	3m 55s	
124	29	January 3, 1554	22:49:38	Total	35.8S 158.1W	-0.2447	1.0474	163	4m 0s	
124	30	January 15, 1572	7:38:12	Total	33S 71.6E	-0.238	1.0485	166	4m 7s	
124	31	February 4, 1590	16:24:05	Total	29.3S 58.8W	-0.2293	1.0498	170	4m 17s	
124	32	February 16, 1608	1:03:28	Total	24.8S 171.7E	-0.2154	1.0515	175	4m 29s	
124	33	February 26, 1626	9:37:26	Total	19.7S 42.7E	-0.1971	1.0535	180	4m 42s	
124	34	March 8, 1644	18:02:43	Total	14S 84.7W	-0.1717	1.0555	186	4m 57s	
124	35	March 20, 1662	2:21:49	Total	7.9S 149.1E	-0.1414	1.0576	191	5m 12s	
124	36	March 30, 1680	10:32:01	Total	1.5S 24.9E	-0.1039	1.0595	197	5m 25s	
124	37	April 10, 1698	18:34:26	Total	5.1N 97.3W	-0.0599	1.0613	201	5m 36s	
124	38	April 22, 1716	2:28:33	Total	11.8N 142.6E	-0.0091	1.0625	205	5m 43s	
124	39	May 3, 1734	10:15:56	Total	18.4N 24.6E	0.0472	1.0635	208	5m 46s	
124	40	May 13, 1752	17:56:29	Total	24.9N 91.1W	0.109	1.0637	210	5m 42s	
124	41	May 25, 1770	1:30:12	Total	31.2N 155.6E	0.176	1.0634	211	5m 31s	
124	42	June 4, 1788	8:59:31	Total	37N 44.4E	0.2465	1.0623	211	5m 15s	
124	43	June 16, 1806	16:24:27	Total	42.2N 64.6W	0.3204	1.0604	210	4m 55s	
124	44	June 26, 1824	23:46:33	Total	46.6N 171.4W	0.396	1.0578	207	4m 31s	
124	45	July 8, 1842	7:06:27	Total	50.1N 83.6E	0.4727	1.0543	204	4m 5s	
124	46	July 18, 1860	14:26:24	Total	52.5N 20.3W	0.5487	1.05	198	3m 39s	
124	47	July 29, 1878	21:47:18	Total	53.8N 124W	0.6232	1.045	191	3m 11s	
124	48	August 9, 1896	5:09:00	Total	54.4N 132.2E	0.6964	1.0392	182	2m 43s	
124	49	August 21, 1914	12:34:27	Total	54.5N 27.1E	0.7655	1.0328	170	2m 14s	
124	50	August 31, 1932	20:03:41	Total	54.5N 79.5W	0.8307	1.0257	155	1m 45s	
124	51	September 12, 1950	3:38:47	Total	54.8N 172.3E	0.8903	1.0182	134	1m 14s	
124	52	September 22, 1968	11:18:46	Total	56.2N 64E	0.9451	1.0099	104	0m 40s	
124	53	October 3, 1986	19:06:15	Hybrid	59.9N 37.1W	0.99305	1.00002	0.8	0m 0.08s	
124	54	October 14, 2004	3:00:23	Partial	61.2N 153.7W	1.0348	0.9282			
124	55	October 25, 2022	11:01:20	Partial	61.6N 77.4E	1.0701	0.8619			
124	56	November 4, 2040	19:09:02	Partial	62.2N 53.4W	1.0993	0.8074			
124	57	November 16, 2058	3:23:07	Partial	62.9N 174.2E	1.1224	0.7644			
124	58	November 26, 2076	11:43:01	Partial	63.7N 40.1E	1.1401	0.7315			
124	59	December 7, 2094	20:05:56	Partial	64.7N 95W	1.1547	0.7046			
124	60	December 19, 2112	4:33:16	Partial	65.7N 128.4E	1.1648	0.6858			
124	61	December 30, 2130	13:01:34	Partial	66.8N 8.8W	1.173	0.6708			
124	62	January 9, 2149	21:30:38	Partial	67.9N 146.7W	1.1802	0.6575			
124	63	January 21, 2167	5:56:25	Partial	68.9N 75.5E	1.1892	0.6413			
124	64	January 31, 2185	14:20:20	Partial	69.9N 62.4W	1.1991	0.6238			
124	65	February 12, 2203	22:38:35	Partial	70.8N 160.4E	1.2128	0.5998			
124	66	February 23, 2221	6:50:48	Partial	71.5N 24.2E	1.2305	0.5688			
124	67	March 6, 2239	14:54:58	Partial	72N 110.6W	1.2541	0.5278			
124	68	March 16, 2257	22:51:29	Partial	72.2N 116.2E	1.2833	0.477			
124	69	March 28, 2275	6:37:50	Partial	72.2N 14.4W	1.3199	0.4133			
124	70	April 7, 2293	14:14:55	Partial	71.8N 142.5W	1.3632	0.338			
124	71	April 19, 2311	21:41:49	Partial	71.3N 92.3E	1.4139	0.2499			
124	72	April 30, 2329	4:59:58	Partial	70.6N 30.1W	1.4705	0.1514			
124	73	May 11, 2347	12:07:08	Partial	69.7N 149.1W	1.5351	0.0391			
