= José Joaquín de Ferrer =

Spanish Basque astronomer

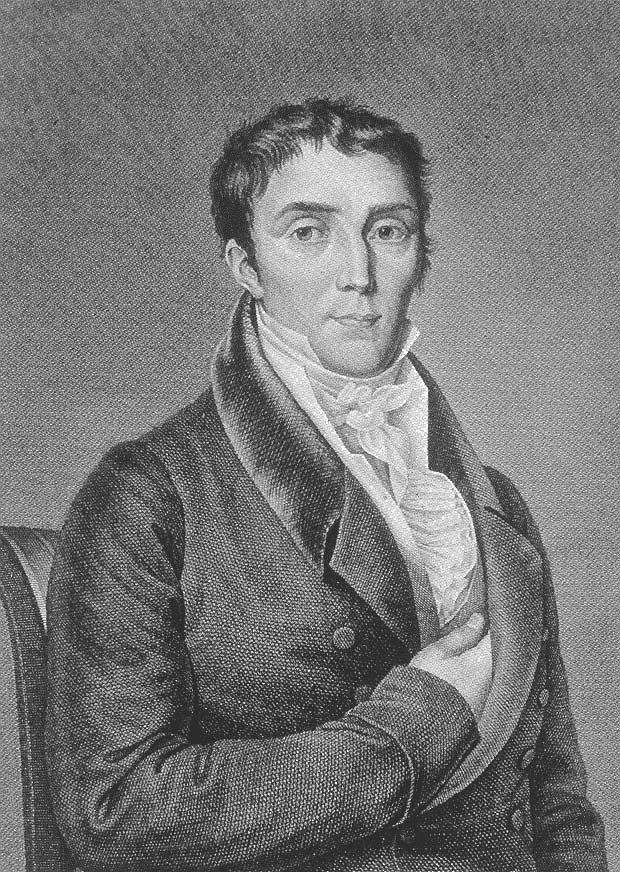
- Born: October 26, 1763; Pasajes, Gipuzkoa, Spain
- Died: May 18, 1818 (aged 54); Bilbao, Spain
- Scientific career
- Fields: Astronomy, cartography, navigation and mathematics

José Joaquín de Ferrer y Cafranga (Pasaia, October 26, 1763 – Bilbao, May 18, 1818) was a Spanish Basque astronomer.

In 1779, aged 17, he was on board the Gipuzcoana Company's Nuestra Señora de la Asunción off Cape St Vincent when the vessel was captured by the British. After surviving captivity with the help of his family, he undertook studies. In 1801, Ferrer was elected as a member of the American Philosophical Society.

The Spanish astronomer was part of the first solar eclipse expeditions. He journeyed to Cuba in 1803 and to New York State in 1806 and observed the two solar eclipses successfully. In the description of the solar eclipse in 1806 observed from Kinderhook, New York he coined the word "corona" for the bright ring observable during a total eclipse.
