= Solar eclipse of June 26, 1824 =

Total eclipse

- Total eclipse
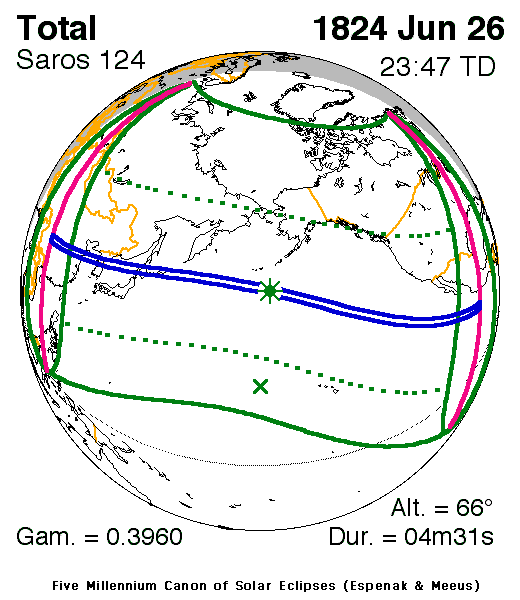
- Map
- Gamma: 0.396
- Magnitude: 1.0578

Maximum eclipse
- Duration: 271 s (4 min 31 s)
- Coordinates: 46.6°N 171.4°W
- Max. width of band: 207 km (129 mi)

Times (UTC)
- Greatest eclipse: 23:46:33

References
- Saros: 124 (44 of 73)
- Catalog # (SE5000): 9101

A total solar eclipse occurred at the Moon's descending node of orbit between Saturday, June 26 and Sunday, June 27, 1824, with a magnitude of 1.0578. A solar eclipse occurs when the Moon passes between Earth and the Sun, thereby totally or partly obscuring the image of the Sun for a viewer on Earth. A total solar eclipse occurs when the Moon's apparent diameter is larger than the Sun's, blocking all direct sunlight, turning day into darkness. Totality occurs in a narrow path across Earth's surface, with the partial solar eclipse visible over a surrounding region thousands of kilometres wide. Occurring about 1.9 days before perigee (on June 28, 1824, at 20:40 UTC), the Moon's apparent diameter was larger.

The path of totality was visible from parts of modern-day China, South Korea, North Korea, and Japan. A partial solar eclipse was also visible for parts of East Asia, Southeast Asia, Hawaii, and North America.

== Eclipse details ==
Shown below are two tables displaying details about this particular solar eclipse. The first table outlines times at which the Moon's penumbra or umbra attains the specific parameter, and the second table describes various other parameters pertaining to this eclipse.

June 26, 1824 Solar Eclipse Times
Event	Time (UTC)
First Penumbral External Contact	1824 June 26 at 21:10:52.2 UTC
First Umbral External Contact	1824 June 26 at 22:09:02.7 UTC
First Central Line	1824 June 26 at 22:10:15.5 UTC
First Umbral Internal Contact	1824 June 26 at 22:11:28.4 UTC
First Penumbral Internal Contact	1824 June 26 at 23:21:31.6 UTC
Equatorial Conjunction	1824 June 26 at 23:40:46.7 UTC
Ecliptic Conjunction	1824 June 26 at 23:42:26.0 UTC
Greatest Duration	1824 June 26 at 23:45:35.5 UTC
Greatest Eclipse	1824 June 26 at 23:46:32.7 UTC
Last Penumbral Internal Contact	1824 June 27 at 00:11:43.0 UTC
Last Umbral Internal Contact	1824 June 27 at 01:21:38.6 UTC
Last Central Line	1824 June 27 at 01:22:53.3 UTC
Last Umbral External Contact	1824 June 27 at 01:24:08.0 UTC
Last Penumbral External Contact	1824 June 27 at 02:22:11.6 UTC

June 26, 1824 Solar Eclipse Parameters
Parameter	Value
Eclipse Magnitude	1.05776
Eclipse Obscuration	1.11885
Gamma	0.39597
Sun Right Ascension	06h22m39.4s
Sun Declination	+23°21'36.2"
Sun Semi-Diameter	15'43.8"
Sun Equatorial Horizontal Parallax	08.6"
Moon Right Ascension	06h22m53.7s
Moon Declination	+23°45'07.9"
Moon Semi-Diameter	16'23.1"
Moon Equatorial Horizontal Parallax	1°00'08.1"
ΔT	10.0 s

== Eclipse season ==
This eclipse is part of an eclipse season, a period, roughly every six months, when eclipses occur. Only two (or occasionally three) eclipse seasons occur each year, and each season lasts about 35 days and repeats just short of six months (173 days) later; thus two full eclipse seasons always occur each year. Either two or three eclipses happen each eclipse season. In the sequence below, each eclipse is separated by a fortnight.

Eclipse season of June–July 1824
June 26 Descending node (new moon)	July 11 Ascending node (full moon)
Total solar eclipse Solar Saros 124	Partial lunar eclipse Lunar Saros 136

== Related eclipses ==
=== Eclipses in 1824 ===
- An annular solar eclipse on January 1.
- A partial lunar eclipse on January 16.
- A total solar eclipse on June 26.
- A partial lunar eclipse on July 11.
- A penumbral lunar eclipse on December 6.
- An annular solar eclipse on December 20.

=== Metonic ===
- Preceded by: Solar eclipse of September 7, 1820
- Followed by: Solar eclipse of April 14, 1828

=== Tzolkinex ===
- Preceded by: Solar eclipse of May 16, 1817
- Followed by: Solar eclipse of August 7, 1831

=== Half-Saros ===
- Preceded by: Lunar eclipse of June 21, 1815
- Followed by: Lunar eclipse of July 2, 1833

=== Tritos ===
- Preceded by: Solar eclipse of July 27, 1813
- Followed by: Solar eclipse of May 27, 1835

=== Solar Saros 124 ===
- Preceded by: Solar eclipse of June 16, 1806
- Followed by: Solar eclipse of July 8, 1842

=== Inex ===
- Preceded by: Solar eclipse of July 16, 1795
- Followed by: Solar eclipse of June 6, 1853

=== Triad ===
- Preceded by: Solar eclipse of August 26, 1737
- Followed by: Solar eclipse of April 28, 1911

=== Solar eclipses of 1823–1826 ===
This eclipse is a member of a semester series. An eclipse in a semester series of solar eclipses repeats approximately every 177 days and 4 hours (a semester) at alternating nodes of the Moon's orbit.

The partial solar eclipses on February 11, 1823 and August 6, 1823 occur in the previous lunar year eclipse set, and the partial solar eclipse on October 31, 1826 occurs in the next lunar year eclipse set.

Solar eclipse series sets from 1823 to 1826
Ascending node			Descending node		
Saros	Map	Gamma	Saros	Map	Gamma
109	January 12, 1823 Partial	−1.5413	114	July 8, 1823 Partial	1.1182
119	January 1, 1824 Annular	−0.8821	124	June 26, 1824 Total	0.3960
129	December 20, 1824 Annular	−0.1685	134	June 16, 1825 Hybrid	−0.3812
139	December 9, 1825 Hybrid	0.5296	144	June 5, 1826 Partial	−1.1887
149	November 29, 1826 Partial	1.1764			

=== Saros 124 ===
This eclipse is a part of Saros series 124, repeating every 18 years, 11 days, and containing 73 events. The series started with a partial solar eclipse on March 6, 1049. It contains total eclipses from June 12, 1211 through September 22, 1968, and a hybrid eclipse on October 3, 1986. There are no annular eclipses in this set. The series ends at member 73 as a partial eclipse on May 11, 2347. Its eclipses are tabulated in three columns; every third eclipse in the same column is one exeligmos apart, so they all cast shadows over approximately the same parts of the Earth.

The longest duration of totality was produced by member 39 at 5 minutes, 46 seconds on May 3, 1734. All eclipses in this series occur at the Moon’s descending node of orbit.

Series members 43–64 occur between 1801 and 2200:
43	44	45
June 16, 1806	June 26, 1824	July 8, 1842
46	47	48
July 18, 1860	July 29, 1878	August 9, 1896
49	50	51
August 21, 1914	August 31, 1932	September 12, 1950
52	53	54
September 22, 1968	October 3, 1986	October 14, 2004
55	56	57
October 25, 2022	November 4, 2040	November 16, 2058
58	59	60
November 26, 2076	December 7, 2094	December 19, 2112
61	62	63
December 30, 2130	January 9, 2149	January 21, 2167
64
January 31, 2185

=== Metonic series ===
The metonic series repeats eclipses every 19 years (6939.69 days), lasting about 5 cycles. Eclipses occur in nearly the same calendar date. In addition, the octon subseries repeats 1/5 of that or every 3.8 years (1387.94 days). All eclipses in this table occur at the Moon's descending node.

22 eclipse events between September 8, 1801 and September 7, 1877
September 7–8	June 26–27	April 14–15	January 31–February 1	November 19–20
112	114	116	118	120
September 8, 1801	June 26, 1805	April 14, 1809	February 1, 1813	November 19, 1816
122	124	126	128	130
September 7, 1820	June 26, 1824	April 14, 1828	February 1, 1832	November 20, 1835
132	134	136	138	140
September 7, 1839	June 27, 1843	April 15, 1847	February 1, 1851	November 20, 1854
142	144	146	148	150
September 7, 1858	June 27, 1862	April 15, 1866	January 31, 1870	November 20, 1873
152
September 7, 1877

=== Tritos series ===
This eclipse is a part of a tritos cycle, repeating at alternating nodes every 135 synodic months (≈ 3986.63 days, or 11 years minus 1 month). Their appearance and longitude are irregular due to a lack of synchronization with the anomalistic month (period of perigee), but groupings of 3 tritos cycles (≈ 33 years minus 3 months) come close (≈ 434.044 anomalistic months), so eclipses are similar in these groupings.

Series members between 1801 and 2200
August 28, 1802 (Saros 122)	July 27, 1813 (Saros 123)	June 26, 1824 (Saros 124)	May 27, 1835 (Saros 125)	April 25, 1846 (Saros 126)
March 25, 1857 (Saros 127)	February 23, 1868 (Saros 128)	January 22, 1879 (Saros 129)	December 22, 1889 (Saros 130)	November 22, 1900 (Saros 131)
October 22, 1911 (Saros 132)	September 21, 1922 (Saros 133)	August 21, 1933 (Saros 134)	July 20, 1944 (Saros 135)	June 20, 1955 (Saros 136)
May 20, 1966 (Saros 137)	April 18, 1977 (Saros 138)	March 18, 1988 (Saros 139)	February 16, 1999 (Saros 140)	January 15, 2010 (Saros 141)
December 14, 2020 (Saros 142)	November 14, 2031 (Saros 143)	October 14, 2042 (Saros 144)	September 12, 2053 (Saros 145)	August 12, 2064 (Saros 146)
July 13, 2075 (Saros 147)	June 11, 2086 (Saros 148)	May 11, 2097 (Saros 149)	April 11, 2108 (Saros 150)	March 11, 2119 (Saros 151)
February 8, 2130 (Saros 152)	January 8, 2141 (Saros 153)	December 8, 2151 (Saros 154)	November 7, 2162 (Saros 155)	October 7, 2173 (Saros 156)
September 4, 2184 (Saros 157)	August 5, 2195 (Saros 158)			

=== Inex series ===
This eclipse is a part of the long period inex cycle, repeating at alternating nodes, every 358 synodic months (≈ 10,571.95 days, or 29 years minus 20 days). Their appearance and longitude are irregular due to a lack of synchronization with the anomalistic month (period of perigee). However, groupings of 3 inex cycles (≈ 87 years minus 2 months) comes close (≈ 1,151.02 anomalistic months), so eclipses are similar in these groupings.

Series members between 1801 and 2200
June 26, 1824 (Saros 124)	June 6, 1853 (Saros 125)	May 17, 1882 (Saros 126)
April 28, 1911 (Saros 127)	April 7, 1940 (Saros 128)	March 18, 1969 (Saros 129)
February 26, 1998 (Saros 130)	February 6, 2027 (Saros 131)	January 16, 2056 (Saros 132)
December 27, 2084 (Saros 133)	December 8, 2113 (Saros 134)	November 17, 2142 (Saros 135)
October 29, 2171 (Saros 136)	October 9, 2200 (Saros 137)	
