= Solar eclipse of July 29, 1878 =

Total eclipse

- Total eclipse
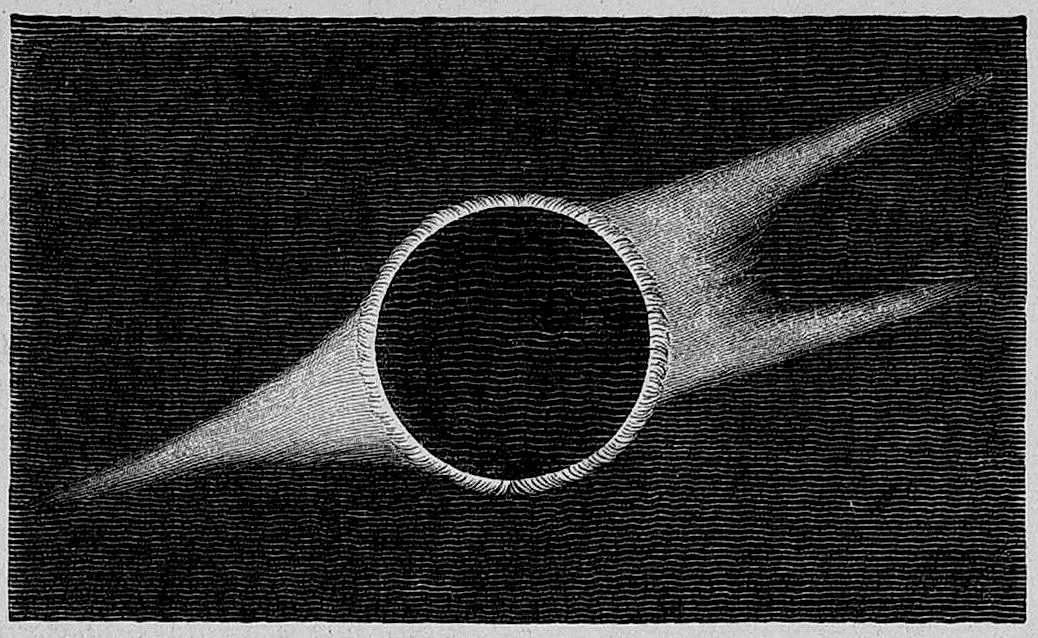

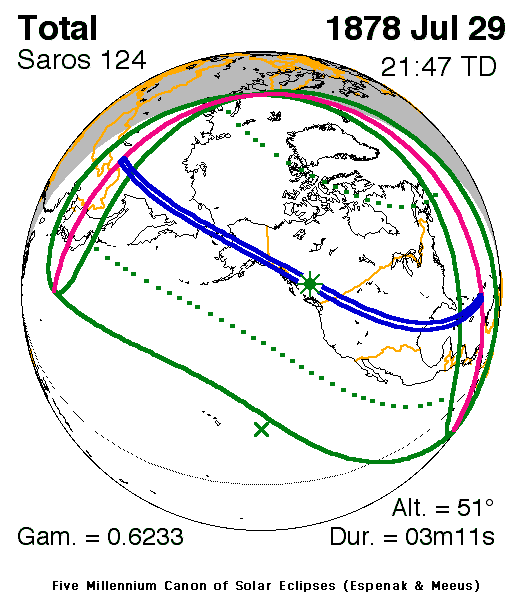
- Map
- Gamma: 0.6232
- Magnitude: 1.045

Maximum eclipse
- Duration: 191 s (3 min 11 s)
- Coordinates: 53.8°N 124°W
- Max. width of band: 191 km (119 mi)

Times (UTC)
- Greatest eclipse: 21:47:18

References
- Saros: 124 (47 of 73)
- Catalog # (SE5000): 9230

A total solar eclipse occurred at the Moon's descending node of orbit between Monday, July 29, and Tuesday, July 30, 1878, with a magnitude of 1.0450. A solar eclipse occurs when the Moon passes between Earth and the Sun, thereby totally or partly obscuring the image of the Sun for a viewer on Earth. A total solar eclipse occurs when the Moon's apparent diameter is larger than the Sun's, blocking all direct sunlight, turning day into darkness. Totality occurs in a narrow path across Earth's surface, with the partial solar eclipse visible over a surrounding region thousands of kilometres wide. Occurring about 2.4 days before perigee (on August 1, 1878, at 6:45 UTC), the Moon's apparent diameter was larger.

The path of totality was visible from parts of modern-day eastern Russia, Alaska, western Canada, Washington, Idaho, Montana, Wyoming, Colorado, New Mexico, Kansas, Oklahoma, Texas, Louisiana, Cuba, Haiti, and the Dominican Republic. A partial solar eclipse was also visible for parts of Northeast Asia, North America, Central America, the Caribbean, and northern South America.

Newspapers in the United States reported of large migrations from the Midwest towards the path of totality to view the eclipse. Scientists observing from Pikes Peak in Colorado contended with altitude sickness and snowstorms, among other problems.

== High-altitude astronomy ==
The 1878 eclipse was a turning point in modern astronomy, because it was the first time that many of the world's leading astronomers had the opportunity to make their observations from the higher altitudes provided by the Rocky Mountains. After the 1878 eclipse, astronomers began to build observatories at locations well above sea level, including on the sides and summits of mountains, a scientific trend which extended throughout the twentieth century and into the twenty-first.

== Eclipse images ==
Étienne Léopold Trouvelot

== Eclipse details ==
Shown below are two tables displaying details about this particular solar eclipse. The first table outlines times at which the Moon's penumbra or umbra attains the specific parameter, and the second table describes various other parameters pertaining to this eclipse.

July 29, 1878 Solar Eclipse Times
Event	Time (UTC)
First Penumbral External Contact	1878 July 29 at 19:18:31.9 UTC
First Umbral External Contact	1878 July 29 at 20:23:40.9 UTC
First Central Line	1878 July 29 at 20:24:46.4 UTC
First Umbral Internal Contact	1878 July 29 at 20:25:52.4 UTC
Equatorial Conjunction	1878 July 29 at 21:23:06.4 UTC
Ecliptic Conjunction	1878 July 29 at 21:40:46.5 UTC
Greatest Duration	1878 July 29 at 21:46:11.9 UTC
Greatest Eclipse	1878 July 29 at 21:47:17.7 UTC
Last Umbral Internal Contact	1878 July 29 at 23:08:56.0 UTC
Last Central Line	1878 July 29 at 23:10:04.0 UTC
Last Umbral External Contact	1878 July 29 at 23:11:11.6 UTC
Last Penumbral External Contact	1878 July 30 at 00:16:08.9 UTC

July 29, 1878 Solar Eclipse Parameters
Parameter	Value
Eclipse Magnitude	1.04495
Eclipse Obscuration	1.09192
Gamma	0.62323
Sun Right Ascension	08h35m50.0s
Sun Declination	+18°38'42.9"
Sun Semi-Diameter	15'45.4"
Sun Equatorial Horizontal Parallax	08.7"
Moon Right Ascension	08h36m44.1s
Moon Declination	+19°13'31.6"
Moon Semi-Diameter	16'15.3"
Moon Equatorial Horizontal Parallax	0°59'39.2"
ΔT	-4.7 s

== Eclipse season ==
This eclipse is part of an eclipse season, a period, roughly every six months, when eclipses occur. Only two (or occasionally three) eclipse seasons occur each year, and each season lasts about 35 days and repeats just short of six months (173 days) later; thus two full eclipse seasons always occur each year. Either two or three eclipses happen each eclipse season. In the sequence below, each eclipse is separated by a fortnight.

Eclipse season of July–August 1878
July 29 Descending node (new moon)	August 13 Ascending node (full moon)
Total solar eclipse Solar Saros 124	Partial lunar eclipse Lunar Saros 136

== Related eclipses ==
=== Eclipses in 1878 ===
- An annular solar eclipse on February 2.
- A partial lunar eclipse on February 17.
- A total solar eclipse on July 29.
- A partial lunar eclipse on August 13.

=== Metonic ===
- Preceded by: Solar eclipse of October 10, 1874
- Followed by: Solar eclipse of May 17, 1882

=== Tzolkinex ===
- Preceded by: Solar eclipse of June 18, 1871
- Followed by: Solar eclipse of September 8, 1885

=== Half-Saros ===
- Preceded by: Lunar eclipse of July 23, 1869
- Followed by: Lunar eclipse of August 3, 1887

=== Tritos ===
- Preceded by: Solar eclipse of August 29, 1867
- Followed by: Solar eclipse of June 28, 1889

=== Solar Saros 124 ===
- Preceded by: Solar eclipse of July 18, 1860
- Followed by: Solar eclipse of August 9, 1896

=== Inex ===
- Preceded by: Solar eclipse of August 18, 1849
- Followed by: Solar eclipse of July 10, 1907

=== Triad ===
- Preceded by: Solar eclipse of September 27, 1791
- Followed by: Solar eclipse of May 30, 1965

=== Solar eclipses of 1877–1880 ===
This eclipse is a member of a semester series. An eclipse in a semester series of solar eclipses repeats approximately every 177 days and 4 hours (a semester) at alternating nodes of the Moon's orbit.

The partial solar eclipses on March 15, 1877 and September 7, 1877 occur in the previous lunar year eclipse set, and the partial solar eclipse on December 2, 1880 occurs in the next lunar year eclipse set.

Solar eclipse series sets from 1877 to 1880
Descending node			Ascending node		
Saros	Map	Gamma	Saros	Map	Gamma
114	August 9, 1877 Partial	1.3277	119	February 2, 1878 Annular	−0.9071
124	July 29, 1878 Total	0.6232	129	January 22, 1879 Annular	−0.1824
134	July 19, 1879 Annular	−0.1439	139	January 11, 1880 Total	0.6136
144	July 7, 1880 Annular	−0.9406	146	December 31, 1880 Partial	1.1591

=== Saros 124 ===
This eclipse is a part of Saros series 124, repeating every 18 years, 11 days, and containing 73 events. The series started with a partial solar eclipse on March 6, 1049. It contains total eclipses from June 12, 1211 through September 22, 1968, and a hybrid eclipse on October 3, 1986. There are no annular eclipses in this set. The series ends at member 73 as a partial eclipse on May 11, 2347. Its eclipses are tabulated in three columns; every third eclipse in the same column is one exeligmos apart, so they all cast shadows over approximately the same parts of the Earth.

The longest duration of totality was produced by member 39 at 5 minutes, 46 seconds on May 3, 1734. All eclipses in this series occur at the Moon’s descending node of orbit.

Series members 43–64 occur between 1801 and 2200:
43	44	45
June 16, 1806	June 26, 1824	July 8, 1842
46	47	48
July 18, 1860	July 29, 1878	August 9, 1896
49	50	51
August 21, 1914	August 31, 1932	September 12, 1950
52	53	54
September 22, 1968	October 3, 1986	October 14, 2004
55	56	57
October 25, 2022	November 4, 2040	November 16, 2058
58	59	60
November 26, 2076	December 7, 2094	December 19, 2112
61	62	63
December 30, 2130	January 9, 2149	January 21, 2167
64
January 31, 2185

=== Metonic series ===
The metonic series repeats eclipses every 19 years (6939.69 days), lasting about 5 cycles. Eclipses occur in nearly the same calendar date. In addition, the octon subseries repeats 1/5 of that or every 3.8 years (1387.94 days). All eclipses in this table occur at the Moon's descending node.

22 eclipse events between March 5, 1848 and July 30, 1935
March 5–6	December 22–24	October 9–11	July 29–30	May 17–18
108	110	112	114	116
March 5, 1848			July 29, 1859	May 17, 1863
118	120	122	124	126
March 6, 1867	December 22, 1870	October 10, 1874	July 29, 1878	May 17, 1882
128	130	132	134	136
March 5, 1886	December 22, 1889	October 9, 1893	July 29, 1897	May 18, 1901
138	140	142	144	146
March 6, 1905	December 23, 1908	October 10, 1912	July 30, 1916	May 18, 1920
148	150	152	154	
March 5, 1924	December 24, 1927	October 11, 1931	July 30, 1935	

=== Tritos series ===
This eclipse is a part of a tritos cycle, repeating at alternating nodes every 135 synodic months (≈ 3986.63 days, or 11 years minus 1 month). Their appearance and longitude are irregular due to a lack of synchronization with the anomalistic month (period of perigee), but groupings of 3 tritos cycles (≈ 33 years minus 3 months) come close (≈ 434.044 anomalistic months), so eclipses are similar in these groupings.

Series members between 1801 and 2200
March 4, 1802 (Saros 117)	February 1, 1813 (Saros 118)	January 1, 1824 (Saros 119)	November 30, 1834 (Saros 120)	October 30, 1845 (Saros 121)
September 29, 1856 (Saros 122)	August 29, 1867 (Saros 123)	July 29, 1878 (Saros 124)	June 28, 1889 (Saros 125)	May 28, 1900 (Saros 126)
April 28, 1911 (Saros 127)	March 28, 1922 (Saros 128)	February 24, 1933 (Saros 129)	January 25, 1944 (Saros 130)	December 25, 1954 (Saros 131)
November 23, 1965 (Saros 132)	October 23, 1976 (Saros 133)	September 23, 1987 (Saros 134)	August 22, 1998 (Saros 135)	July 22, 2009 (Saros 136)
June 21, 2020 (Saros 137)	May 21, 2031 (Saros 138)	April 20, 2042 (Saros 139)	March 20, 2053 (Saros 140)	February 17, 2064 (Saros 141)
January 16, 2075 (Saros 142)	December 16, 2085 (Saros 143)	November 15, 2096 (Saros 144)	October 16, 2107 (Saros 145)	September 15, 2118 (Saros 146)
August 15, 2129 (Saros 147)	July 14, 2140 (Saros 148)	June 14, 2151 (Saros 149)	May 14, 2162 (Saros 150)	April 12, 2173 (Saros 151)
March 12, 2184 (Saros 152)	February 10, 2195 (Saros 153)			

=== Inex series ===
This eclipse is a part of the long period inex cycle, repeating at alternating nodes, every 358 synodic months (≈ 10,571.95 days, or 29 years minus 20 days). Their appearance and longitude are irregular due to a lack of synchronization with the anomalistic month (period of perigee). However, groupings of 3 inex cycles (≈ 87 years minus 2 months) comes close (≈ 1,151.02 anomalistic months), so eclipses are similar in these groupings.

Series members between 1801 and 2200
September 7, 1820 (Saros 122)	August 18, 1849 (Saros 123)	July 29, 1878 (Saros 124)
July 10, 1907 (Saros 125)	June 19, 1936 (Saros 126)	May 30, 1965 (Saros 127)
May 10, 1994 (Saros 128)	April 20, 2023 (Saros 129)	March 30, 2052 (Saros 130)
March 10, 2081 (Saros 131)	February 18, 2110 (Saros 132)	January 30, 2139 (Saros 133)
January 10, 2168 (Saros 134)	December 19, 2196 (Saros 135)	
