= Solar eclipse of June 16, 1806 =

Total eclipse

- Total eclipse
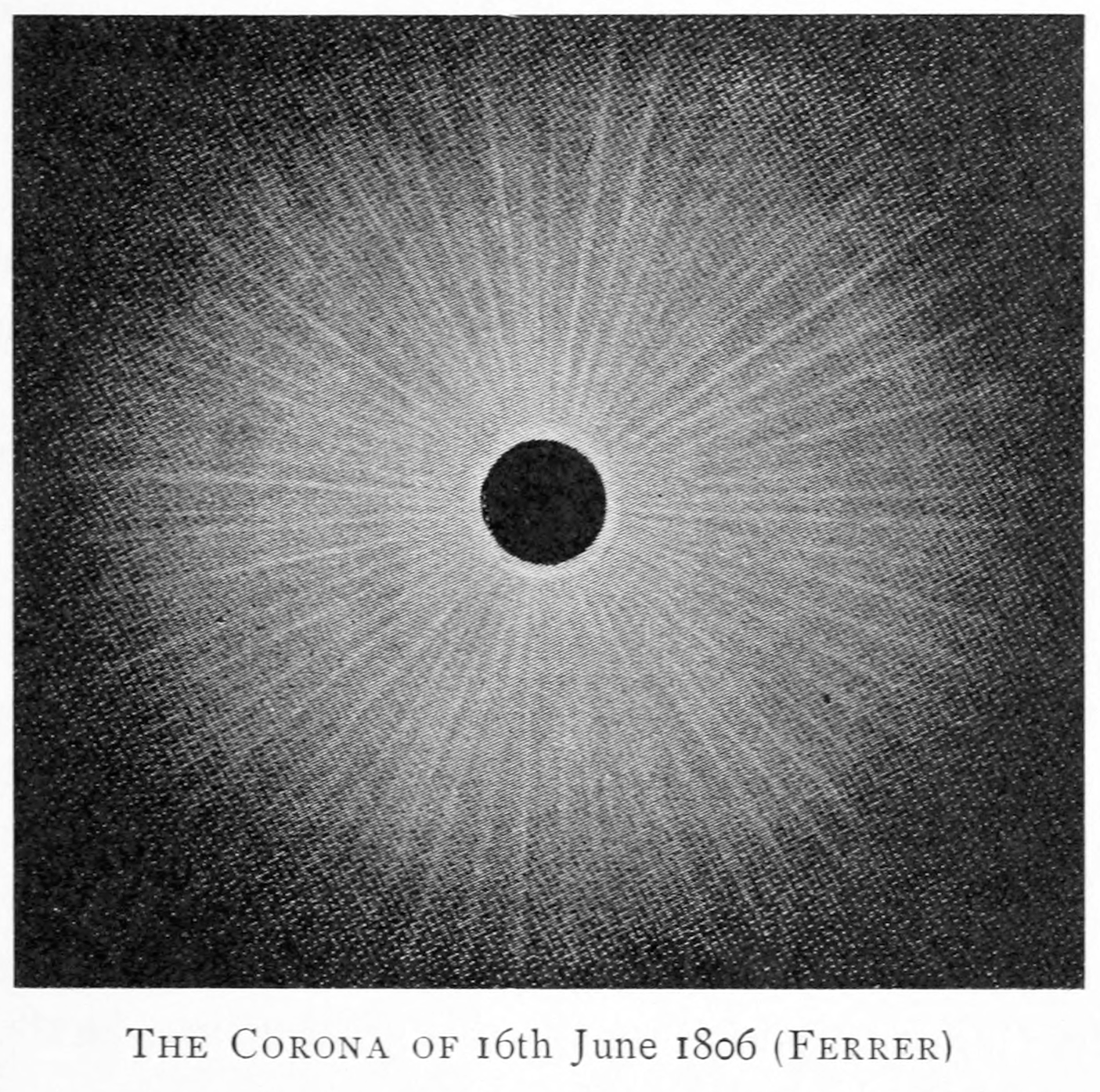
- Ferrer's illustration of the eclipse

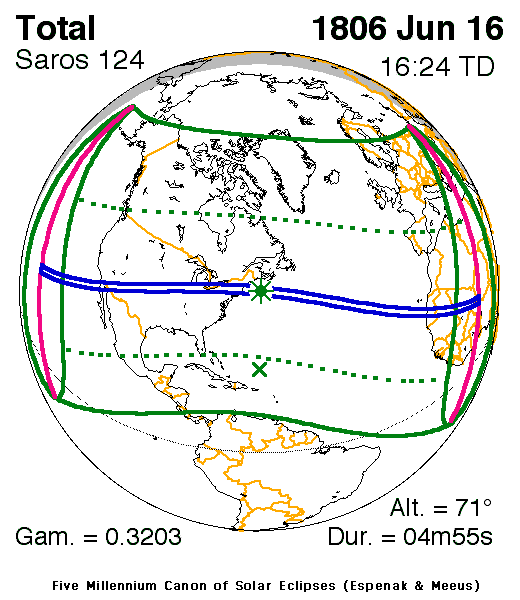
- Map
- Gamma: 0.3204
- Magnitude: 1.0604

Maximum eclipse
- Duration: 295 s (4 min 55 s)
- Coordinates: 42.2°N 64.6°W
- Max. width of band: 210 km (130 mi)

Times (UTC)
- Greatest eclipse: 16:24:27

References
- Saros: 124 (43 of 73)
- Catalog # (SE5000): 9056

A total solar eclipse occurred at the Moon's descending node of orbit on Monday, June 16, 1806 (sometimes dubbed Tecumseh's Eclipse), with a magnitude of 1.0604. A solar eclipse occurs when the Moon passes between Earth and the Sun, thereby totally or partly obscuring the image of the Sun for a viewer on Earth. A total solar eclipse occurs when the Moon's apparent diameter is larger than the Sun's, blocking all direct sunlight, turning day into darkness. Totality occurs in a narrow path across Earth's surface, with the partial solar eclipse visible over a surrounding region thousands of kilometres wide. Occurring about 1.7 days before perigee (on June 18, 1806, at 9:30 UTC), the Moon's apparent diameter was larger.

The path of totality was visible from parts of modern-day northwestern Mexico, the states of Arizona, New Mexico, Colorado, northwestern Texas, Oklahoma, Kansas, Missouri, southeastern Iowa, Illinois, Indiana, Michigan, Ohio, Pennsylvania, New York, Connecticut, Massachusetts, Vermont, New Hampshire, Rhode Island, and Maine in the United States, Western Sahara, Mauritania, Mali, and Niger. A partial solar eclipse was also visible for parts of North America, Central America, the Caribbean, Europe, and West Africa.

The eclipse was predicted by Shawnee prophet Tenskwatawa and its appearance aided unity among the Indigenous peoples of North America. Astronomer José Joaquín de Ferrer observed and named the solar corona during this eclipse.

== Observations ==
José Joaquín de Ferrer observed the eclipse from Kinderhook, New York, where he named the corona.

Capel Lofft observed from the United Kingdom of Great Britain and Ireland.

=== Tenskwatawa's prediction ===
It has been called Tecumseh's Eclipse after the Shawnee chief, Tecumseh.

This tribal unity threatened William Henry Harrison, the Territorial Governor of Indiana and future 9th President of the United States. Harrison tried to discredit the Shawnee leader by challenging Tenskwatawa to prove his powers. He wrote: "If he (Tenskwatawa) is really a prophet, ask him to cause the Sun to stand still or the Moon to alter its course, the rivers to cease to flow or the dead to rise from their graves."

Tenskwatawa declared that the Great Spirit was angry at Harrison and would give a sign. "Fifty days from this day there will be no cloud in the sky. Yet, when the Sun has reached its highest point, at that moment will the Great Spirit take it into her hand and hide it from us. The darkness of night will thereupon cover us and the stars will shine round about us. The birds will roost and the night creatures will awaken and stir." On that day, there was an eclipse, and Harrison's attempt to divide the Shawnee people backfired spectacularly.

== Eclipse details ==
Shown below are two tables displaying details about this particular solar eclipse. The first table outlines times at which the Moon's penumbra or umbra attains the specific parameter, and the second table describes various other parameters pertaining to this eclipse.

June 16, 1806 Solar Eclipse Times
Event	Time (UTC)
First Penumbral External Contact	1806 June 16 at 13:47:18.5 UTC
First Umbral External Contact	1806 June 16 at 14:44:05.8 UTC
First Central Line	1806 June 16 at 14:45:19.5 UTC
First Umbral Internal Contact	1806 June 16 at 14:46:33.4 UTC
First Penumbral Internal Contact	1806 June 16 at 15:49:22.2 UTC
Ecliptic Conjunction	1806 June 16 at 16:21:07.3 UTC
Equatorial Conjunction	1806 June 16 at 16:22:27.7 UTC
Greatest Duration	1806 June 16 at 16:24:24.6 UTC
Greatest Eclipse	1806 June 16 at 16:24:26.5 UTC
Last Penumbral Internal Contact	1806 June 16 at 16:59:34.4 UTC
Last Umbral Internal Contact	1806 June 16 at 18:02:18.7 UTC
Last Central Line	1806 June 16 at 18:03:34.3 UTC
Last Umbral External Contact	1806 June 16 at 18:04:49.9 UTC
Last Penumbral External Contact	1806 June 16 at 19:01:31.5 UTC

June 16, 1806 Solar Eclipse Parameters
Parameter	Value
Eclipse Magnitude	1.06042
Eclipse Obscuration	1.12449
Gamma	0.32035
Sun Right Ascension	05h37m06.5s
Sun Declination	+23°21'35.2"
Sun Semi-Diameter	15'44.3"
Sun Equatorial Horizontal Parallax	08.7"
Moon Right Ascension	05h37m11.4s
Moon Declination	+23°40'49.1"
Moon Semi-Diameter	16'25.5"
Moon Equatorial Horizontal Parallax	1°00'17.0"
ΔT	12.1 s

== Eclipse season ==
This eclipse is part of an eclipse season, a period, roughly every six months, when eclipses occur. Only two (or occasionally three) eclipse seasons occur each year, and each season lasts about 35 days and repeats just short of six months (173 days) later; thus two full eclipse seasons always occur each year. Either two or three eclipses happen each eclipse season. In the sequence below, each eclipse is separated by a fortnight.

Eclipse season of June 1806
June 16 Descending node (new moon)	June 30 Ascending node (full moon)
Total solar eclipse Solar Saros 124	Partial lunar eclipse Lunar Saros 136

== Related eclipses ==
=== Eclipses in 1806 ===
- A partial lunar eclipse on January 5.
- A total solar eclipse on June 16.
- A penumbral lunar eclipse on June 30.
- A penumbral lunar eclipse on November 25.
- An annular solar eclipse on December 10.
- A penumbral lunar eclipse on December 25.

=== Metonic ===
- Preceded by: Solar eclipse of August 28, 1802
- Followed by: Solar eclipse of April 4, 1810

=== Tzolkinex ===
- Preceded by: Solar eclipse of May 5, 1799
- Followed by: Solar eclipse of July 27, 1813

=== Half-Saros ===
- Preceded by: Lunar eclipse of June 9, 1797
- Followed by: Lunar eclipse of June 21, 1815

=== Tritos ===
- Preceded by: Solar eclipse of July 16, 1795
- Followed by: Solar eclipse of May 16, 1817

=== Solar Saros 124 ===
- Preceded by: Solar eclipse of June 4, 1788
- Followed by: Solar eclipse of June 26, 1824

=== Inex ===
- Preceded by: Solar eclipse of July 5, 1777
- Followed by: Solar eclipse of May 27, 1835

=== Triad ===
- Preceded by: Solar eclipse of August 15, 1719
- Followed by: Solar eclipse of April 16, 1893

=== Solar eclipses of 1805–1808 ===
This eclipse is a member of a semester series. An eclipse in a semester series of solar eclipses repeats approximately every 177 days and 4 hours (a semester) at alternating nodes of the Moon's orbit.

The partial solar eclipses on January 30, 1805 and July 26, 1805 occur in the previous lunar year eclipse set, and the partial solar eclipse on October 19, 1808 occurs in the next lunar year eclipse set.

Solar eclipse series sets from 1805 to 1808
Ascending node			Descending node		
Saros	Map	Gamma	Saros	Map	Gamma
109	January 1, 1805 Partial	−1.5315	114	June 27, 1805 Partial	1.0462
119	December 21, 1805 Annular	−0.8751	124	June 16, 1806 Total	0.3204
129	December 10, 1806 Annular	−0.1627	134	June 6, 1807 Hybrid	−0.4577
139	November 29, 1807 Hybrid	0.5377	144	May 25, 1808 Partial	−1.2665
149	November 18, 1808 Partial	1.1874			

=== Saros 124 ===
This eclipse is a part of Saros series 124, repeating every 18 years, 11 days, and containing 73 events. The series started with a partial solar eclipse on March 6, 1049. It contains total eclipses from June 12, 1211 through September 22, 1968, and a hybrid eclipse on October 3, 1986. There are no annular eclipses in this set. The series ends at member 73 as a partial eclipse on May 11, 2347. Its eclipses are tabulated in three columns; every third eclipse in the same column is one exeligmos apart, so they all cast shadows over approximately the same parts of the Earth.

The longest duration of totality was produced by member 39 at 5 minutes, 46 seconds on May 3, 1734. All eclipses in this series occur at the Moon’s descending node of orbit.

Series members 43–64 occur between 1801 and 2200:
43	44	45
June 16, 1806	June 26, 1824	July 8, 1842
46	47	48
July 18, 1860	July 29, 1878	August 9, 1896
49	50	51
August 21, 1914	August 31, 1932	September 12, 1950
52	53	54
September 22, 1968	October 3, 1986	October 14, 2004
55	56	57
October 25, 2022	November 4, 2040	November 16, 2058
58	59	60
November 26, 2076	December 7, 2094	December 19, 2112
61	62	63
December 30, 2130	January 9, 2149	January 21, 2167
64
January 31, 2185

=== Metonic series ===
The metonic series repeats eclipses every 19 years (6939.69 days), lasting about 5 cycles. Eclipses occur in nearly the same calendar date. In addition, the octon subseries repeats 1/5 of that or every 3.8 years (1387.94 days). All eclipses in this table occur at the Moon's descending node.

24 eclipse events between August 28, 1802 and August 28, 1859
August 27–28	June 16	April 3–4	January 20–21	November 9
122	124	126	128	130
August 28, 1802	June 16, 1806	April 4, 1810	January 21, 1814	November 9, 1817
132	134	136	138	140
August 27, 1821	June 16, 1825	April 3, 1829	January 20, 1833	November 9, 1836
142	144	146	148	150
August 27, 1840	June 16, 1844	April 3, 1848	January 21, 1852	November 9, 1855
152
August 28, 1859

=== Tritos series ===
This eclipse is a part of a tritos cycle, repeating at alternating nodes every 135 synodic months (≈ 3986.63 days, or 11 years minus 1 month). Their appearance and longitude are irregular due to a lack of synchronization with the anomalistic month (period of perigee), but groupings of 3 tritos cycles (≈ 33 years minus 3 months) come close (≈ 434.044 anomalistic months), so eclipses are similar in these groupings.

Series members between 1801 and 2200
June 16, 1806 (Saros 124)	May 16, 1817 (Saros 125)	April 14, 1828 (Saros 126)	March 15, 1839 (Saros 127)	February 12, 1850 (Saros 128)
January 11, 1861 (Saros 129)	December 12, 1871 (Saros 130)	November 10, 1882 (Saros 131)	October 9, 1893 (Saros 132)	September 9, 1904 (Saros 133)
August 10, 1915 (Saros 134)	July 9, 1926 (Saros 135)	June 8, 1937 (Saros 136)	May 9, 1948 (Saros 137)	April 8, 1959 (Saros 138)
March 7, 1970 (Saros 139)	February 4, 1981 (Saros 140)	January 4, 1992 (Saros 141)	December 4, 2002 (Saros 142)	November 3, 2013 (Saros 143)
October 2, 2024 (Saros 144)	September 2, 2035 (Saros 145)	August 2, 2046 (Saros 146)	July 1, 2057 (Saros 147)	May 31, 2068 (Saros 148)
May 1, 2079 (Saros 149)	March 31, 2090 (Saros 150)	February 28, 2101 (Saros 151)	January 29, 2112 (Saros 152)	December 28, 2122 (Saros 153)
November 26, 2133 (Saros 154)	October 26, 2144 (Saros 155)	September 26, 2155 (Saros 156)	August 25, 2166 (Saros 157)	July 25, 2177 (Saros 158)
June 24, 2188 (Saros 159)	May 24, 2199 (Saros 160)			

=== Inex series ===
This eclipse is a part of the long period inex cycle, repeating at alternating nodes, every 358 synodic months (≈ 10,571.95 days, or 29 years minus 20 days). Their appearance and longitude are irregular due to a lack of synchronization with the anomalistic month (period of perigee). However, groupings of 3 inex cycles (≈ 87 years minus 2 months) comes close (≈ 1,151.02 anomalistic months), so eclipses are similar in these groupings.

Series members between 1801 and 2200
June 16, 1806 (Saros 124)	May 27, 1835 (Saros 125)	May 6, 1864 (Saros 126)
April 16, 1893 (Saros 127)	March 28, 1922 (Saros 128)	March 7, 1951 (Saros 129)
February 16, 1980 (Saros 130)	January 26, 2009 (Saros 131)	January 5, 2038 (Saros 132)
December 17, 2066 (Saros 133)	November 27, 2095 (Saros 134)	November 6, 2124 (Saros 135)
October 17, 2153 (Saros 136)	September 27, 2182 (Saros 137)	
