= Solar eclipse of November 16, 2058 =

Future partial solar eclipse

- Partial eclipse
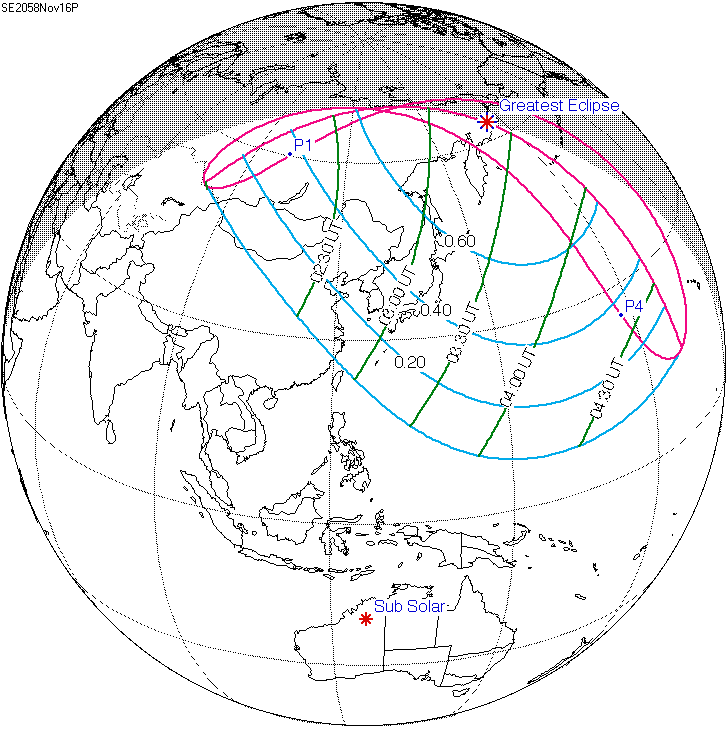
- Map
- Gamma: 1.1224
- Magnitude: 0.7644

Maximum eclipse
- Coordinates: 62.9°N 174.2°E

Times (UTC)
- Greatest eclipse: 3:23:07

References
- Saros: 124 (57 of 73)
- Catalog # (SE5000): 9639

A partial solar eclipse will occur at the Moon's descending node of orbit on Saturday, November 16, 2058, with a magnitude of 0.7644. A solar eclipse occurs when the Moon passes between Earth and the Sun, thereby totally or partly obscuring the image of the Sun for a viewer on Earth. A partial solar eclipse occurs in the polar regions of the Earth when the center of the Moon's shadow misses the Earth.

The partial solar eclipse will be visible for parts of Northeast Asia.

== Eclipse details ==
Shown below are two tables displaying details about this particular solar eclipse. The first table outlines times at which the Moon's penumbra or umbra attains the specific parameter, and the second table describes various other parameters pertaining to this eclipse.

November 16, 2058 Solar Eclipse Times
Event	Time (UTC)
First Penumbral External Contact	2058 November 16 at 01:25:37.0 UTC
Equatorial Conjunction	2058 November 16 at 02:38:28.2 UTC
Ecliptic Conjunction	2058 November 16 at 03:10:59.7 UTC
Greatest Eclipse	2058 November 16 at 03:23:07.3 UTC
Last Penumbral External Contact	2058 November 16 at 05:20:50.7 UTC

November 16, 2058 Solar Eclipse Parameters
Parameter	Value
Eclipse Magnitude	0.76445
Eclipse Obscuration	0.69696
Gamma	1.12238
Sun Right Ascension	15h26m32.8s
Sun Declination	-18°46'09.8"
Sun Semi-Diameter	16'10.2"
Sun Equatorial Horizontal Parallax	08.9"
Moon Right Ascension	15h28m05.5s
Moon Declination	-17°45'10.1"
Moon Semi-Diameter	15'47.0"
Moon Equatorial Horizontal Parallax	0°57'55.4"
ΔT	89.7 s

== Eclipse season ==
This eclipse is part of an eclipse season, a period, roughly every six months, when eclipses occur. Only two (or occasionally three) eclipse seasons occur each year, and each season lasts about 35 days and repeats just short of six months (173 days) later; thus two full eclipse seasons always occur each year. Either two or three eclipses happen each eclipse season. In the sequence below, each eclipse is separated by a fortnight.

Eclipse season of November 2058
November 16 Descending node (new moon)	November 30 Ascending node (full moon)
Partial solar eclipse Solar Saros 124	Total lunar eclipse Lunar Saros 136

== Related eclipses ==
=== Eclipses in 2058 ===
- A partial solar eclipse on May 22.
- A total lunar eclipse on June 6.
- A partial solar eclipse on June 21.
- A partial solar eclipse on November 16.
- A total lunar eclipse on November 30.

=== Metonic ===
- Preceded by: Solar eclipse of January 27, 2055
- Followed by: Solar eclipse of September 3, 2062

=== Tzolkinex ===
- Preceded by: Solar eclipse of October 4, 2051
- Followed by: Solar eclipse of December 27, 2065

=== Half-Saros ===
- Preceded by: Lunar eclipse of November 9, 2049
- Followed by: Lunar eclipse of November 21, 2067

=== Tritos ===
- Preceded by: Solar eclipse of December 16, 2047
- Followed by: Solar eclipse of October 15, 2069

=== Solar Saros 124 ===
- Preceded by: Solar eclipse of November 4, 2040
- Followed by: Solar eclipse of November 26, 2076

=== Inex ===
- Preceded by: Solar eclipse of December 5, 2029
- Followed by: Solar eclipse of October 26, 2087

=== Triad ===
- Preceded by: Solar eclipse of January 16, 1972
- Followed by: Solar eclipse of September 16, 2145

=== Solar eclipses of 2058–2061 ===
This eclipse is a member of a semester series. An eclipse in a semester series of solar eclipses repeats approximately every 177 days and 4 hours (a semester) at alternating nodes of the Moon's orbit.

The partial solar eclipse on June 21, 2058 occurs in the previous lunar year eclipse set.

Solar eclipse series sets from 2058 to 2061
Ascending node			Descending node		
Saros	Map	Gamma	Saros	Map	Gamma
119	May 22, 2058 Partial	−1.3194	124	November 16, 2058 Partial	1.1224
129	May 11, 2059 Total	−0.508	134	November 5, 2059 Annular	0.4454
139	April 30, 2060 Total	0.2422	144	October 24, 2060 Annular	−0.2625
149	April 20, 2061 Total	0.9578	154	October 13, 2061 Annular	−0.9639

=== Saros 124 ===
This eclipse is a part of Saros series 124, repeating every 18 years, 11 days, and containing 73 events. The series started with a partial solar eclipse on March 6, 1049. It contains total eclipses from June 12, 1211 through September 22, 1968, and a hybrid eclipse on October 3, 1986. There are no annular eclipses in this set. The series ends at member 73 as a partial eclipse on May 11, 2347. Its eclipses are tabulated in three columns; every third eclipse in the same column is one exeligmos apart, so they all cast shadows over approximately the same parts of the Earth.

The longest duration of totality was produced by member 39 at 5 minutes, 46 seconds on May 3, 1734. All eclipses in this series occur at the Moon’s descending node of orbit.

Series members 43–64 occur between 1801 and 2200:
43	44	45
June 16, 1806	June 26, 1824	July 8, 1842
46	47	48
July 18, 1860	July 29, 1878	August 9, 1896
49	50	51
August 21, 1914	August 31, 1932	September 12, 1950
52	53	54
September 22, 1968	October 3, 1986	October 14, 2004
55	56	57
October 25, 2022	November 4, 2040	November 16, 2058
58	59	60
November 26, 2076	December 7, 2094	December 19, 2112
61	62	63
December 30, 2130	January 9, 2149	January 21, 2167
64
January 31, 2185

=== Metonic series ===
The metonic series repeats eclipses every 19 years (6939.69 days), lasting about 5 cycles. Eclipses occur in nearly the same calendar date. In addition, the octon subseries repeats 1/5 of that or every 3.8 years (1387.94 days). All eclipses in this table occur at the Moon's descending node.

22 eclipse events between June 23, 2047 and November 16, 2134
June 22–23	April 10–11	January 27–29	November 15–16	September 3–5
118	120	122	124	126
June 23, 2047	April 11, 2051	January 27, 2055	November 16, 2058	September 3, 2062
128	130	132	134	136
June 22, 2066	April 11, 2070	January 27, 2074	November 15, 2077	September 3, 2081
138	140	142	144	146
June 22, 2085	April 10, 2089	January 27, 2093	November 15, 2096	September 4, 2100
148	150	152	154	156
June 22, 2104	April 11, 2108	January 29, 2112	November 16, 2115	September 5, 2119
158	160	162	164	
June 23, 2123			November 16, 2134	

=== Tritos series ===
This eclipse is a part of a tritos cycle, repeating at alternating nodes every 135 synodic months (≈ 3986.63 days, or 11 years minus 1 month). Their appearance and longitude are irregular due to a lack of synchronization with the anomalistic month (period of perigee), but groupings of 3 tritos cycles (≈ 33 years minus 3 months) come close (≈ 434.044 anomalistic months), so eclipses are similar in these groupings.

The partial solar eclipses on March 27, 1884 (part of Saros 108) and December 24, 1916 (part of Saros 111) are also a part of this series but are not included in the table below.

Series members between 1971 and 2200
July 22, 1971 (Saros 116)	June 21, 1982 (Saros 117)	May 21, 1993 (Saros 118)	April 19, 2004 (Saros 119)	March 20, 2015 (Saros 120)
February 17, 2026 (Saros 121)	January 16, 2037 (Saros 122)	December 16, 2047 (Saros 123)	November 16, 2058 (Saros 124)	October 15, 2069 (Saros 125)
September 13, 2080 (Saros 126)	August 15, 2091 (Saros 127)	July 15, 2102 (Saros 128)	June 13, 2113 (Saros 129)	May 14, 2124 (Saros 130)
April 13, 2135 (Saros 131)	March 12, 2146 (Saros 132)	February 9, 2157 (Saros 133)	January 10, 2168 (Saros 134)	December 9, 2178 (Saros 135)
November 8, 2189 (Saros 136)	October 9, 2200 (Saros 137)			

=== Inex series ===
This eclipse is a part of the long period inex cycle, repeating at alternating nodes, every 358 synodic months (≈ 10,571.95 days, or 29 years minus 20 days). Their appearance and longitude are irregular due to a lack of synchronization with the anomalistic month (period of perigee). However, groupings of 3 inex cycles (≈ 87 years minus 2 months) comes close (≈ 1,151.02 anomalistic months), so eclipses are similar in these groupings.

Series members between 1801 and 2200
April 26, 1827 (Saros 116)	April 5, 1856 (Saros 117)	March 16, 1885 (Saros 118)
February 25, 1914 (Saros 119)	February 4, 1943 (Saros 120)	January 16, 1972 (Saros 121)
December 25, 2000 (Saros 122)	December 5, 2029 (Saros 123)	November 16, 2058 (Saros 124)
October 26, 2087 (Saros 125)	October 6, 2116 (Saros 126)	September 16, 2145 (Saros 127)
August 27, 2174 (Saros 128)		
