= Solar eclipse of July 18, 1860 =

Total eclipse

- Total eclipse
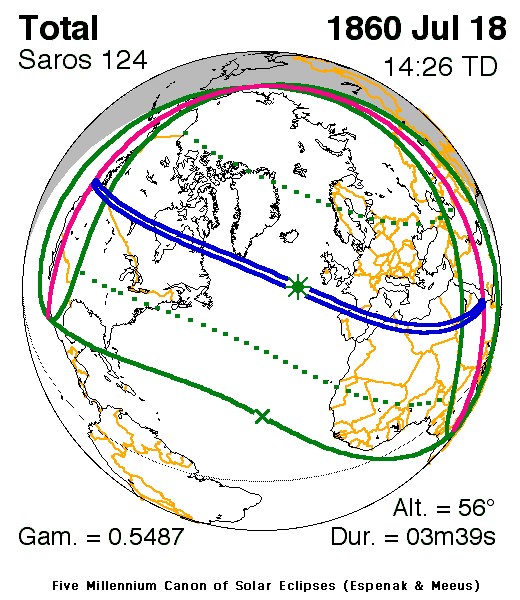
- Map
- Gamma: 0.5487
- Magnitude: 1.05

Maximum eclipse
- Duration: 219 s (3 min 39 s)
- Coordinates: 52.5°N 20.3°W
- Max. width of band: 198 km (123 mi)

Times (UTC)
- Greatest eclipse: 14:26:24

References
- Saros: 124 (46 of 73)
- Catalog # (SE5000): 9188

A total solar eclipse occurred at the Moon's descending node of orbit on Wednesday, July 18, 1860, with a magnitude of 1.0500. A solar eclipse occurs when the Moon passes between Earth and the Sun, thereby totally or partly obscuring the image of the Sun for a viewer on Earth. A total solar eclipse occurs when the Moon's apparent diameter is larger than the Sun's, blocking all direct sunlight, turning day into darkness. Totality occurs in a narrow path across Earth's surface, with the partial solar eclipse visible over a surrounding region thousands of kilometres wide. Occurring about 2.2 days before perigee (on July 20, 1860, at 19:15 UTC), the Moon's apparent diameter was larger.

The path of totality was visible from parts of modern-day northwestern Oregon, Washington, northern Idaho, northwestern Montana, Canada, Spain, Algeria, Tunisia, Libya, Egypt, Sudan, and Eritrea. A partial solar eclipse was also visible for parts of North America, Europe, West Asia, North Africa, and West Africa.

== Coronal Mass Ejection ==
The first coronal mass ejection may have been observed as coronal loops progressing during this total eclipse.

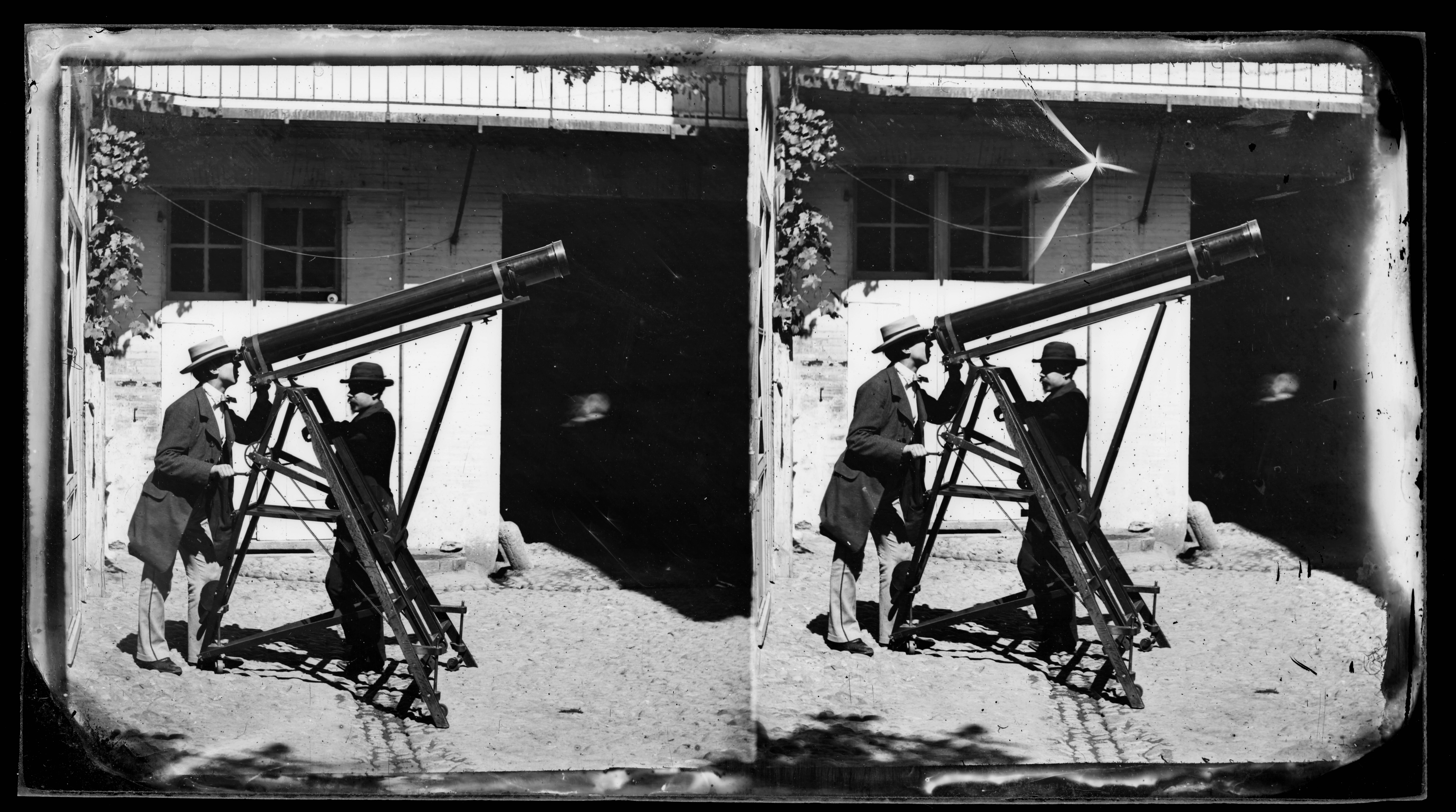
People watching an eclipse in 1860 at Toulouse, France. Picture by Eugène Trutat, Muséum de Toulouse.

== Eclipse details ==
Shown below are two tables displaying details about this particular solar eclipse. The first table outlines times at which the Moon's penumbra or umbra attains the specific parameter, and the second table describes various other parameters pertaining to this eclipse.

July 18, 1860 Solar Eclipse Times
Event	Time (UTC)
First Penumbral External Contact	1860 July 18 at 11:54:56.3 UTC
First Umbral External Contact	1860 July 18 at 12:57:13.1 UTC
First Central Line	1860 July 18 at 12:58:21.9 UTC
First Umbral Internal Contact	1860 July 18 at 12:59:31.0 UTC
Equatorial Conjunction	1860 July 18 at 14:09:18.4 UTC
Ecliptic Conjunction	1860 July 18 at 14:20:40.8 UTC
Greatest Duration	1860 July 18 at 14:24:54.3 UTC
Greatest Eclipse	1860 July 18 at 14:26:24.2 UTC
Last Umbral Internal Contact	1860 July 18 at 15:53:26.2 UTC
Last Central Line	1860 July 18 at 15:54:37.2 UTC
Last Umbral External Contact	1860 July 18 at 15:55:48.0 UTC
Last Penumbral External Contact	1860 July 18 at 16:57:54.9 UTC

July 18, 1860 Solar Eclipse Parameters
Parameter	Value
Eclipse Magnitude	1.05000
Eclipse Obscuration	1.10249
Gamma	0.54871
Sun Right Ascension	07h52m23.3s
Sun Declination	+20°56'51.5"
Sun Semi-Diameter	15'44.4"
Sun Equatorial Horizontal Parallax	08.7"
Moon Right Ascension	07h53m03.2s
Moon Declination	+21°28'15.4"
Moon Semi-Diameter	16'18.0"
Moon Equatorial Horizontal Parallax	0°59'49.1"
ΔT	7.7 s

== Eclipse season ==
This eclipse is part of an eclipse season, a period, roughly every six months, when eclipses occur. Only two (or occasionally three) eclipse seasons occur each year, and each season lasts about 35 days and repeats just short of six months (173 days) later; thus two full eclipse seasons always occur each year. Either two or three eclipses happen each eclipse season. In the sequence below, each eclipse is separated by a fortnight.

Eclipse season of July–August 1860
July 18 Descending node (new moon)	August 1 Ascending node (full moon)
Total solar eclipse Solar Saros 124	Partial lunar eclipse Lunar Saros 136

== Related eclipses ==
=== Eclipses in 1860 ===
- An annular solar eclipse on January 23.
- A partial lunar eclipse on February 7.
- A total solar eclipse on July 18.
- A partial lunar eclipse on August 1.
- A penumbral lunar eclipse on December 28.

=== Metonic ===
- Preceded by: Solar eclipse of September 29, 1856
- Followed by: Solar eclipse of May 6, 1864

=== Tzolkinex ===
- Preceded by: Solar eclipse of June 6, 1853
- Followed by: Solar eclipse of August 29, 1867

=== Half-Saros ===
- Preceded by: Lunar eclipse of July 13, 1851
- Followed by: Lunar eclipse of July 23, 1869

=== Tritos ===
- Preceded by: Solar eclipse of August 18, 1849
- Followed by: Solar eclipse of June 18, 1871

=== Solar Saros 124 ===
- Preceded by: Solar eclipse of July 8, 1842
- Followed by: Solar eclipse of July 29, 1878

=== Inex ===
- Preceded by: Solar eclipse of August 7, 1831
- Followed by: Solar eclipse of June 28, 1889

=== Triad ===
- Preceded by: Solar eclipse of September 16, 1773
- Followed by: Solar eclipse of May 20, 1947

=== Solar eclipses of 1859–1862 ===
This eclipse is a member of a semester series. An eclipse in a semester series of solar eclipses repeats approximately every 177 days and 4 hours (a semester) at alternating nodes of the Moon's orbit.

The partial solar eclipses on March 4, 1859 and August 28, 1859 occur in the previous lunar year eclipse set, and the partial solar eclipse on November 21, 1862 occurs in the next lunar year eclipse set.

Solar eclipse series sets from 1859 to 1862
Ascending node			Descending node		
Saros	Map	Gamma	Saros	Map	Gamma
109	February 3, 1859 Partial	−1.5659	114	July 29, 1859 Partial	1.2598
119	January 23, 1860 Annular	−0.8969	124	July 18, 1860 Total	0.5487
129	January 11, 1861 Annular	−0.1766	134	July 8, 1861 Annular	−0.2231
139	December 31, 1861 Total	0.5187	144	June 27, 1862 Partial	−1.0252
149	December 21, 1862 Partial	1.1633			

=== Saros 124 ===
This eclipse is a part of Saros series 124, repeating every 18 years, 11 days, and containing 73 events. The series started with a partial solar eclipse on March 6, 1049. It contains total eclipses from June 12, 1211 through September 22, 1968, and a hybrid eclipse on October 3, 1986. There are no annular eclipses in this set. The series ends at member 73 as a partial eclipse on May 11, 2347. Its eclipses are tabulated in three columns; every third eclipse in the same column is one exeligmos apart, so they all cast shadows over approximately the same parts of the Earth.

The longest duration of totality was produced by member 39 at 5 minutes, 46 seconds on May 3, 1734. All eclipses in this series occur at the Moon’s descending node of orbit.

Series members 43–64 occur between 1801 and 2200:
43	44	45
June 16, 1806	June 26, 1824	July 8, 1842
46	47	48
July 18, 1860	July 29, 1878	August 9, 1896
49	50	51
August 21, 1914	August 31, 1932	September 12, 1950
52	53	54
September 22, 1968	October 3, 1986	October 14, 2004
55	56	57
October 25, 2022	November 4, 2040	November 16, 2058
58	59	60
November 26, 2076	December 7, 2094	December 19, 2112
61	62	63
December 30, 2130	January 9, 2149	January 21, 2167
64
January 31, 2185

=== Metonic series ===
The metonic series repeats eclipses every 19 years (6939.69 days), lasting about 5 cycles. Eclipses occur in nearly the same calendar date. In addition, the octon subseries repeats 1/5 of that or every 3.8 years (1387.94 days). All eclipses in this table occur at the Moon's descending node.

22 eclipse events between February 23, 1830 and July 19, 1917
February 22–23	December 11–12	September 29–30	July 18–19	May 6–7
108	110	112	114	116
February 23, 1830			July 18, 1841	May 6, 1845
118	120	122	124	126
February 23, 1849	December 11, 1852	September 29, 1856	July 18, 1860	May 6, 1864
128	130	132	134	136
February 23, 1868	December 12, 1871	September 29, 1875	July 19, 1879	May 6, 1883
138	140	142	144	146
February 22, 1887	December 12, 1890	September 29, 1894	July 18, 1898	May 7, 1902
148	150	152	154	
February 23, 1906	December 12, 1909	September 30, 1913	July 19, 1917	

=== Tritos series ===
This eclipse is a part of a tritos cycle, repeating at alternating nodes every 135 synodic months (≈ 3986.63 days, or 11 years minus 1 month). Their appearance and longitude are irregular due to a lack of synchronization with the anomalistic month (period of perigee), but groupings of 3 tritos cycles (≈ 33 years minus 3 months) come close (≈ 434.044 anomalistic months), so eclipses are similar in these groupings.

Series members between 1801 and 2200
December 21, 1805 (Saros 119)	November 19, 1816 (Saros 120)	October 20, 1827 (Saros 121)	September 18, 1838 (Saros 122)	August 18, 1849 (Saros 123)
July 18, 1860 (Saros 124)	June 18, 1871 (Saros 125)	May 17, 1882 (Saros 126)	April 16, 1893 (Saros 127)	March 17, 1904 (Saros 128)
February 14, 1915 (Saros 129)	January 14, 1926 (Saros 130)	December 13, 1936 (Saros 131)	November 12, 1947 (Saros 132)	October 12, 1958 (Saros 133)
September 11, 1969 (Saros 134)	August 10, 1980 (Saros 135)	July 11, 1991 (Saros 136)	June 10, 2002 (Saros 137)	May 10, 2013 (Saros 138)
April 8, 2024 (Saros 139)	March 9, 2035 (Saros 140)	February 5, 2046 (Saros 141)	January 5, 2057 (Saros 142)	December 6, 2067 (Saros 143)
November 4, 2078 (Saros 144)	October 4, 2089 (Saros 145)	September 4, 2100 (Saros 146)	August 4, 2111 (Saros 147)	July 4, 2122 (Saros 148)
June 3, 2133 (Saros 149)	May 3, 2144 (Saros 150)	April 2, 2155 (Saros 151)	March 2, 2166 (Saros 152)	January 29, 2177 (Saros 153)
December 29, 2187 (Saros 154)	November 28, 2198 (Saros 155)			

=== Inex series ===
This eclipse is a part of the long period inex cycle, repeating at alternating nodes, every 358 synodic months (≈ 10,571.95 days, or 29 years minus 20 days). Their appearance and longitude are irregular due to a lack of synchronization with the anomalistic month (period of perigee). However, groupings of 3 inex cycles (≈ 87 years minus 2 months) comes close (≈ 1,151.02 anomalistic months), so eclipses are similar in these groupings.

Series members between 1801 and 2200
August 28, 1802 (Saros 122)	August 7, 1831 (Saros 123)	July 18, 1860 (Saros 124)
June 28, 1889 (Saros 125)	June 8, 1918 (Saros 126)	May 20, 1947 (Saros 127)
April 29, 1976 (Saros 128)	April 8, 2005 (Saros 129)	March 20, 2034 (Saros 130)
February 28, 2063 (Saros 131)	February 7, 2092 (Saros 132)	January 19, 2121 (Saros 133)
December 30, 2149 (Saros 134)	December 9, 2178 (Saros 135)	

== See also ==
- Solar storm of 1859
