= Solar eclipse of July 2, 2019 =

Total eclipse

- Total eclipse
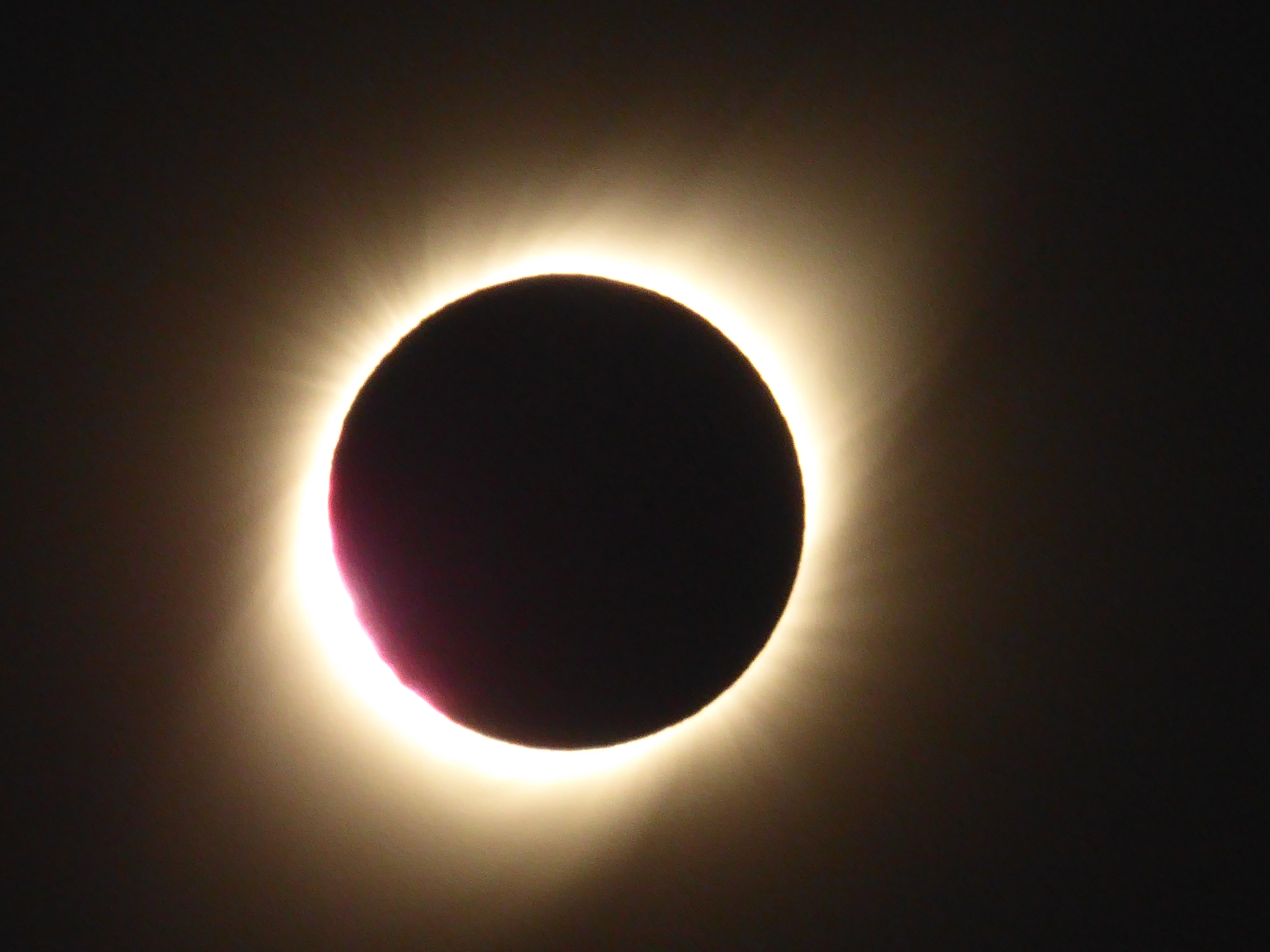
- Totality viewed from La Serena, Chile

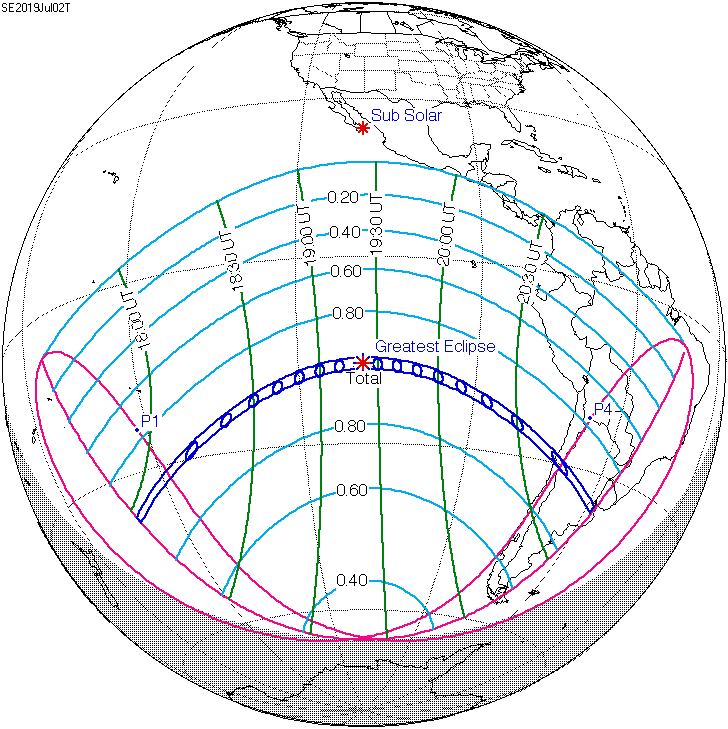
- Map
- Gamma: −0.6466
- Magnitude: 1.0459

Maximum eclipse
- Duration: 273 s (4 min 33 s)
- Coordinates: 17.4°S 109°W
- Max. width of band: 201 km (125 mi)

Times (UTC)
- Greatest eclipse: 19:24:08

References
- Saros: 127 (58 of 82)
- Catalog # (SE5000): 9551

A total solar eclipse occurred at the Moon's ascending node of orbit on Tuesday, July 2, 2019, with a magnitude of 1.0459. A total solar eclipse occurs when the Moon's apparent diameter is larger than the Sun's and the apparent path of the Sun and Moon intersect, blocking all direct sunlight and turning daylight into darkness; the Sun appears to be black with a halo around it. Totality occurs in a narrow path across Earth's surface, with the partial solar eclipse visible over a surrounding region thousands of kilometres wide. Occurring about 2.4 days before perigee (on July 5, 2019, at 6:00 UTC), the Moon's apparent diameter was larger.

Totality was visible from the southern Pacific Ocean east of New Zealand to the Pitcairn Islands and the Tuamotu Archipelago and finally reaching the Coquimbo Region in Chile and central Argentina near sunset, with the maximum of 4 minutes 33 seconds visible from the Pacific Ocean. A partial eclipse was visible for parts of eastern Oceania, South America, and southern Central America. A total solar eclipse crossed a similar region of the Earth about a year and a half later on December 14, 2020.

== Visibility ==
Animated path

Geostationary satellite view of the eclipse by NOAA's GOES East. Hurricane Barbara can also be seen in the northern hemisphere.

Following the North American solar eclipse of August 21, 2017, Astronomers Without Borders collected eclipse glasses for redistribution to Latin America and Asia for the 2019 eclipses.

Totality travelled over areas with low levels of humidity and light pollution, allowing for very good observations. Several major observatories experienced totality, including the European Southern Observatory.

=== Oeno Island ===
The first land surface and the only Pacific island from which totality was visible is Oeno Island, an uninhabited atoll in the Pitcairn Islands.

=== Chile ===
Totality was visible in a large portion of Coquimbo Region and small parts of Atacama Region. Cities in the path included La Serena and La Higuera. Approximately 300,000 people visited La Serena to view the event. Tickets to view the eclipse from the European Southern Observatory were sold for US$2000 each.

=== Argentina ===
Totality was visible in the provinces of San Juan, La Rioja, San Luis, Córdoba, Santa Fe, and Buenos Aires. Cities in the path included San Juan and Río Cuarto. The path of totality finished at the Samborombon Bay, where the eclipsed sunset was observed from San Clemente del Tuyu.

== Eclipse timing ==
=== Places experiencing total eclipse ===
Solar Eclipse of July 2, 2019 (Local Times)
| Country or territory | City or place | Start of partial eclipse | Start of total eclipse | Maximum eclipse | End of total eclipse | End of partial eclipse | Duration of totality (min:s) | Duration of eclipse (hr:min) | Maximum magnitude |
|---|---|---|---|---|---|---|---|---|---|
| Chile | La Serena | 15:22:26 | 16:38:08 | 16:39:15 | 16:40:23 | 17:46:32 | 2:15 | 2:24 | 1.0094 |
| Argentina | San Juan | 16:25:51 | 17:40:21 | 17:40:29 | 17:40:37 | 18:42:09 (sunset) | 0:16 | 2:16 | 1.0004 |
| Argentina | Bella Vista | 16:25:26 | 17:39:28 | 17:40:43 | 17:41:58 | 18:46:50 | 2:30 | 2:22 | 1.0179 |
| Argentina | San José de Jáchal | 16:26:21 | 17:40:20 | 17:41:18 | 17:42:16 | 18:46:03 (sunset) | 1:56 | 2:20 | 1.0072 |
| Argentina | Bragado | 16:33:40 | 17:42:16 | 17:42:50 | 17:43:24 | 18:01:09 (sunset) | 1:08 | 1:27 | 1.0028 |
| Argentina | Junín | 16:33:36 | 17:42:04 | 17:43:04 | 17:44:04 | 18:04:19 (sunset) | 2:00 | 1:31 | 1.0105 |

=== Places experiencing partial eclipse ===
Solar Eclipse of July 2, 2019 (Local Times)
| Country or territory | City or place | Start of partial eclipse | Maximum eclipse | End of partial eclipse | Duration of eclipse (hr:min) | Maximum coverage |
|---|---|---|---|---|---|---|
| Tokelau | Fakaofo (Note: The times listed for this location occur on July 3, 2019, local time.) | 06:41:18 (sunrise) | 06:47:46 | 07:11:43 | 0:30 | 2.95% |
| American Samoa | Pago Pago | 06:47:59 (sunrise) | 06:50:20 | 07:27:06 | 0:39 | 13.52% |
| Cook Islands | Rarotonga | 07:17:16 (sunrise) | 07:52:06 | 08:53:09 | 1:36 | 49.22% |
| Samoa | Apia | 06:51:27 (sunrise) | 06:54:54 | 07:24:37 | 0:33 | 10.70% |
| Niue | Alofi | 06:53:39 (sunrise) | 06:56:04 | 07:37:30 | 0:44 | 26.60% |
| French Polynesia | Papeete | 06:56:47 | 07:57:49 | 09:07:21 | 2:11 | 53.20% |
| French Polynesia | Gambier Islands | 08:01:39 | 09:17:27 | 10:45:06 | 2:43 | 96.22% |
| Tonga | Nuku'alofa | 07:18:47 (sunrise) | 07:21:14 | 07:35:52 | 0:17 | 8.85% |
| Pitcairn Islands | Adamstown | 09:07:20 | 10:26:55 | 11:58:02 | 2:51 | 97.73% |
| Clipperton Island | Clipperton Island | 10:25:50 | 11:24:31 | 12:23:06 | 1:57 | 11.13% |
| Falkland Islands | Stanley | 16:21:17 | 16:47:56 | 16:52:15 (sunset) | 0:31 | 24.89% |
| Ecuador | Galápagos Islands | 12:57:00 | 14:15:36 | 15:25:07 | 2:28 | 34.22% |
| Nicaragua | Managua | 14:03:26 | 14:16:01 | 14:28:21 | 0:25 | 0.14% |
| Brazil | Rio de Janeiro | 17:03:45 | 17:16:17 | 17:19:19 (sunset) | 0:16 | 8.36% |
| Costa Rica | San José | 13:53:24 | 14:21:10 | 14:47:38 | 0:54 | 1.55% |
| Brazil | São Paulo | 17:00:05 | 17:28:21 | 17:31:56 (sunset) | 0:32 | 26.10% |
| Brazil | Porto Alegre | 16:47:53 | 17:33:42 | 17:36:26 (sunset) | 0:49 | 58.48% |
| Ecuador | Quito | 14:36:13 | 15:35:08 | 16:27:46 | 1:52 | 18.53% |
| Chile | Santiago | 15:21:24 | 16:36:59 | 17:43:40 | 2:25 | 92.17% |
| Colombia | Bogotá | 15:06:57 | 15:38:50 | 16:08:45 | 1:02 | 3.18% |
| Peru | Lima | 14:22:34 | 15:39:22 | 16:45:44 | 2:23 | 53.83% |
| Uruguay | Montevideo | 16:38:15 | 17:41:34 | 17:44:29 (sunset) | 1:06 | 94.51% |
| Argentina | Buenos Aires | 16:36:22 | 17:44:19 | 17:54:01 (sunset) | 1:18 | 99.73% |
| Colombia | Leticia | 14:53:04 | 15:46:40 | 16:34:50 | 1:42 | 18.67% |
| Bolivia | La Paz | 15:38:57 | 16:48:28 | 17:49:19 | 2:10 | 54.69% |
| Brazil | Uruguaiana | 16:42:23 | 17:48:48 | 18:00:28 (sunset) | 1:18 | 82.54% |
| Brazil | Brasília | 17:11:24 | 17:49:22 | 17:51:47 (sunset) | 0:40 | 21.80% |
| Bolivia | Sucre | 15:41:42 | 16:50:01 | 17:50:04 | 2:08 | 58.71% |
| Paraguay | Asunción | 15:46:26 | 16:51:26 | 17:12:25 (sunset) | 1:26 | 68.09% |
| Brazil | Foz do Iguaçu | 16:49:43 | 17:52:21 | 17:59:40 (sunset) | 1:10 | 64.29% |

== Gallery ==
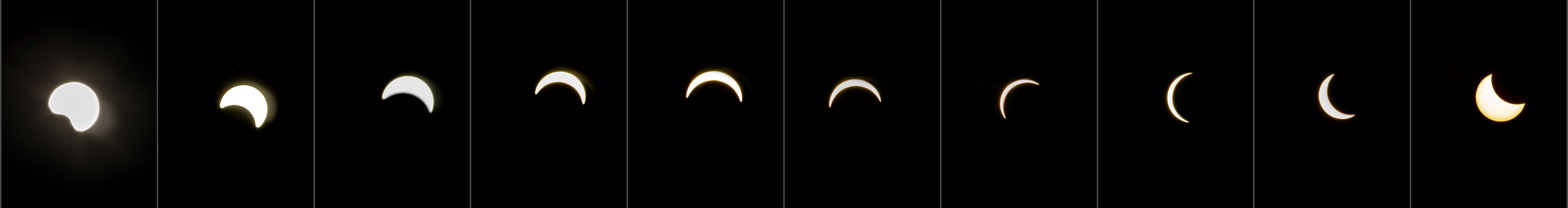
Eclipse progression from Huechuraba, Chile
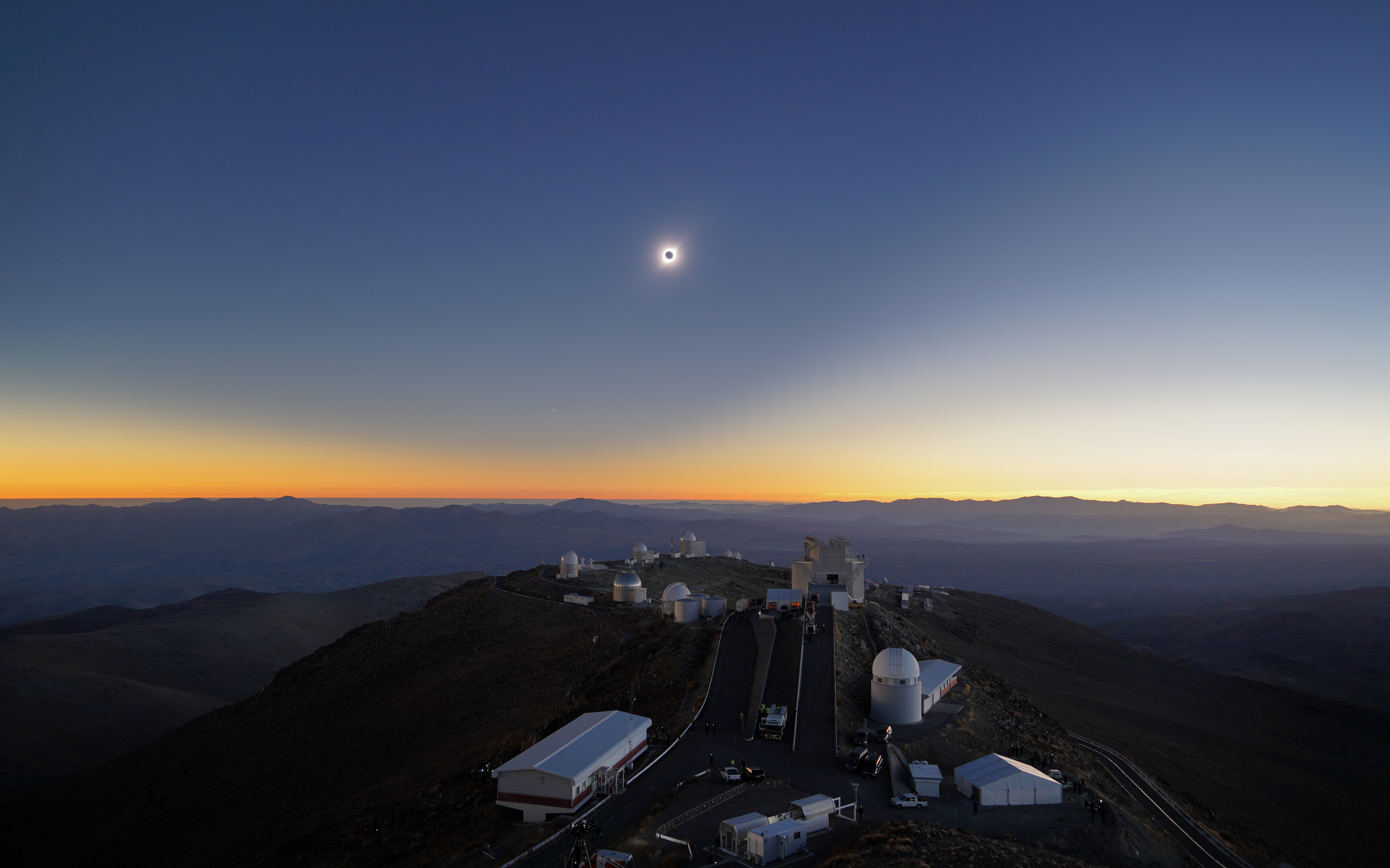
Totality over La Silla Observatory, Chile

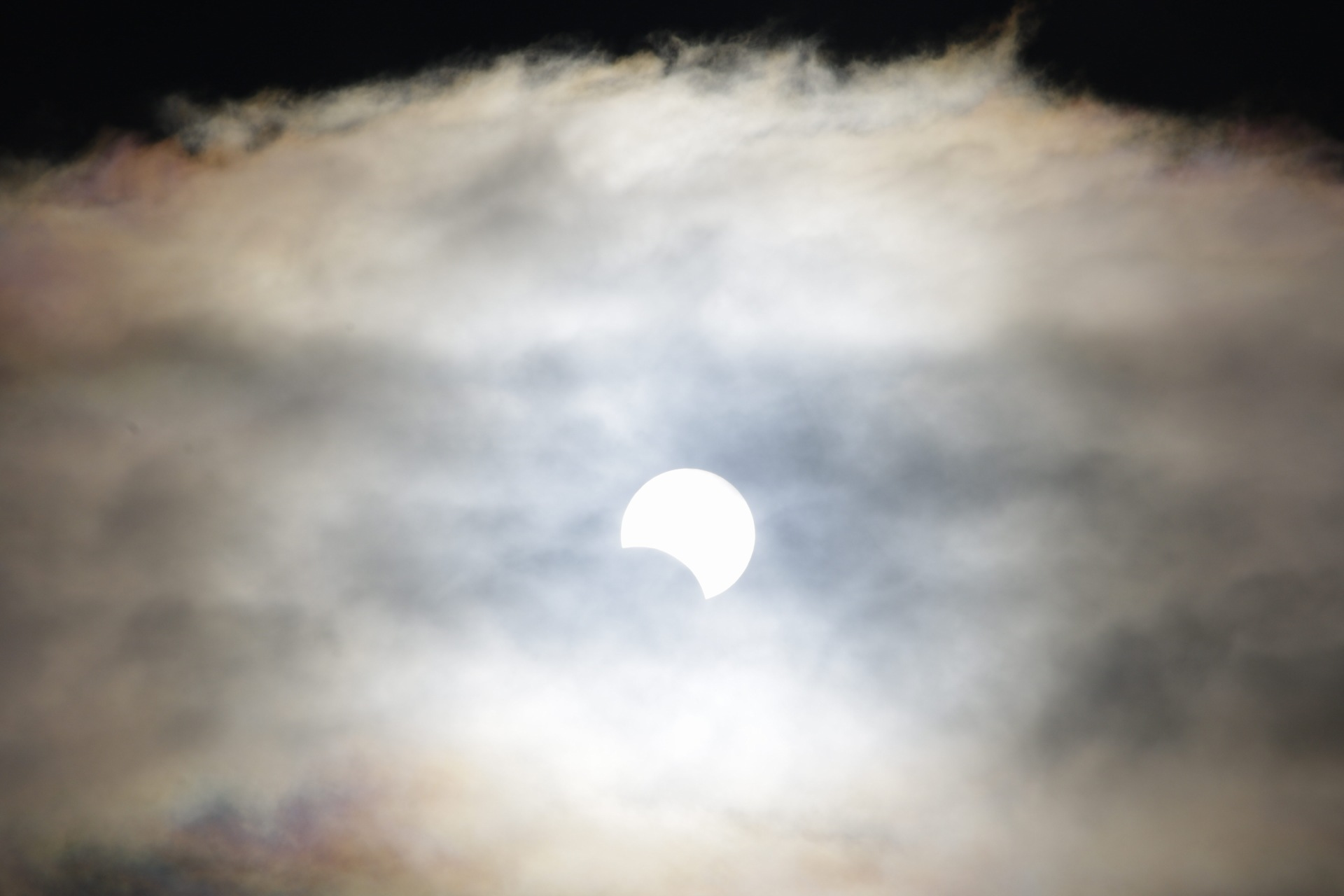
Partial from Temuco, Chile, 19:42 UTC

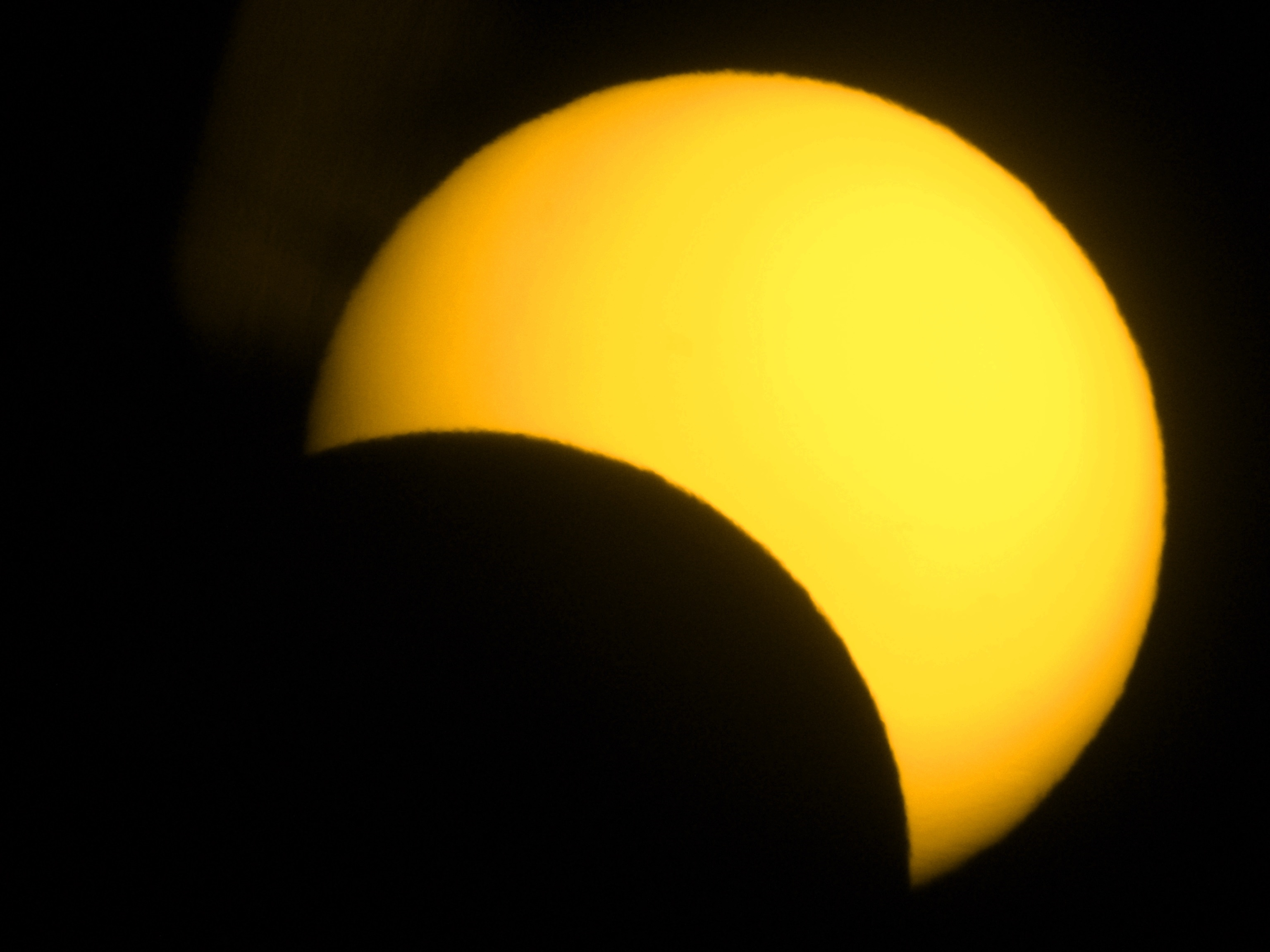
Partial from Buenos Aires, Argentina, 20:10 UTC

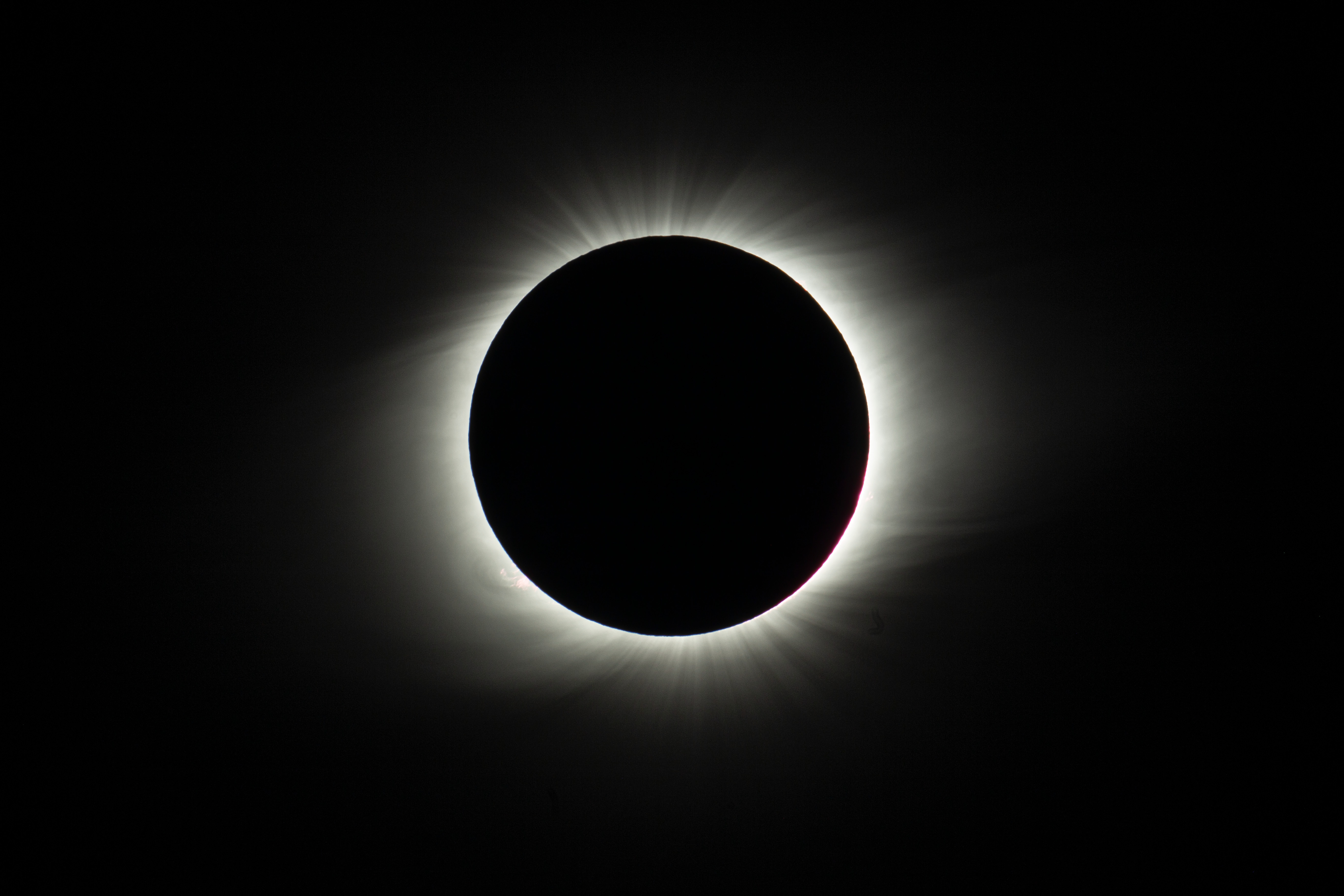
Totality as seen from La Silla Observatory, 20:39 UTC

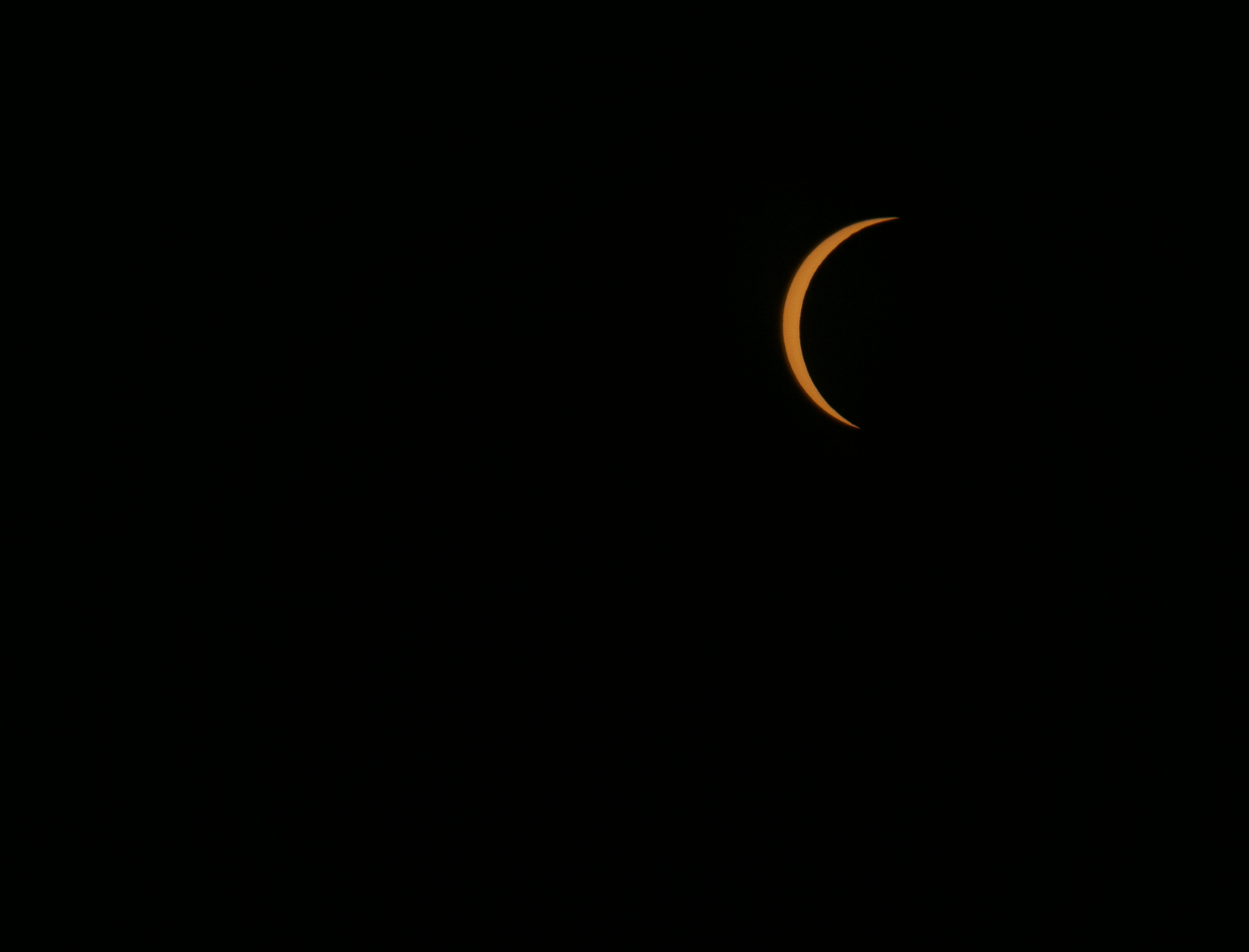
From Ñuñoa, Chile, 20:41 UTC, near greatest eclipse

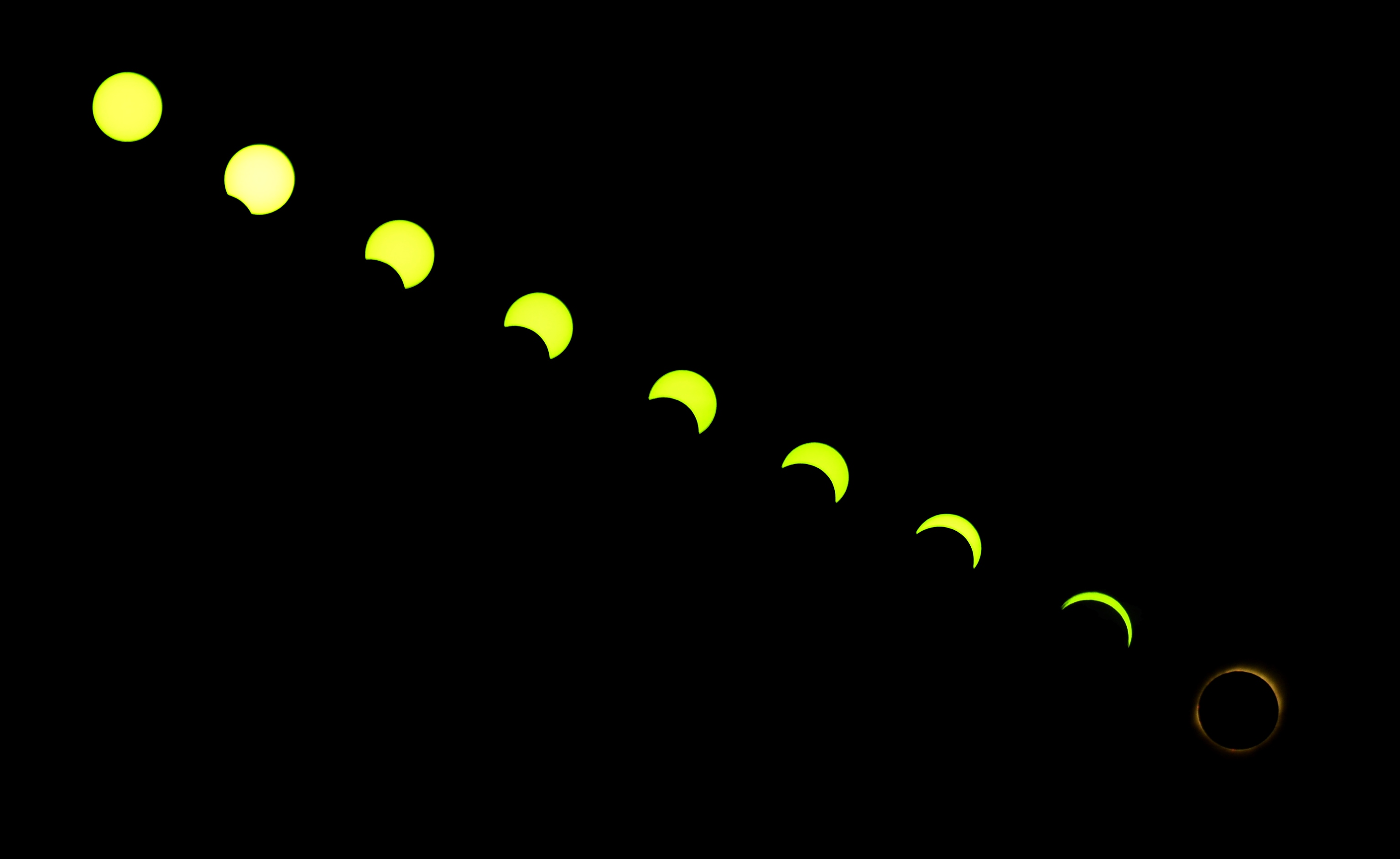
Time-lapse image from Marcos Juárez, Argentina

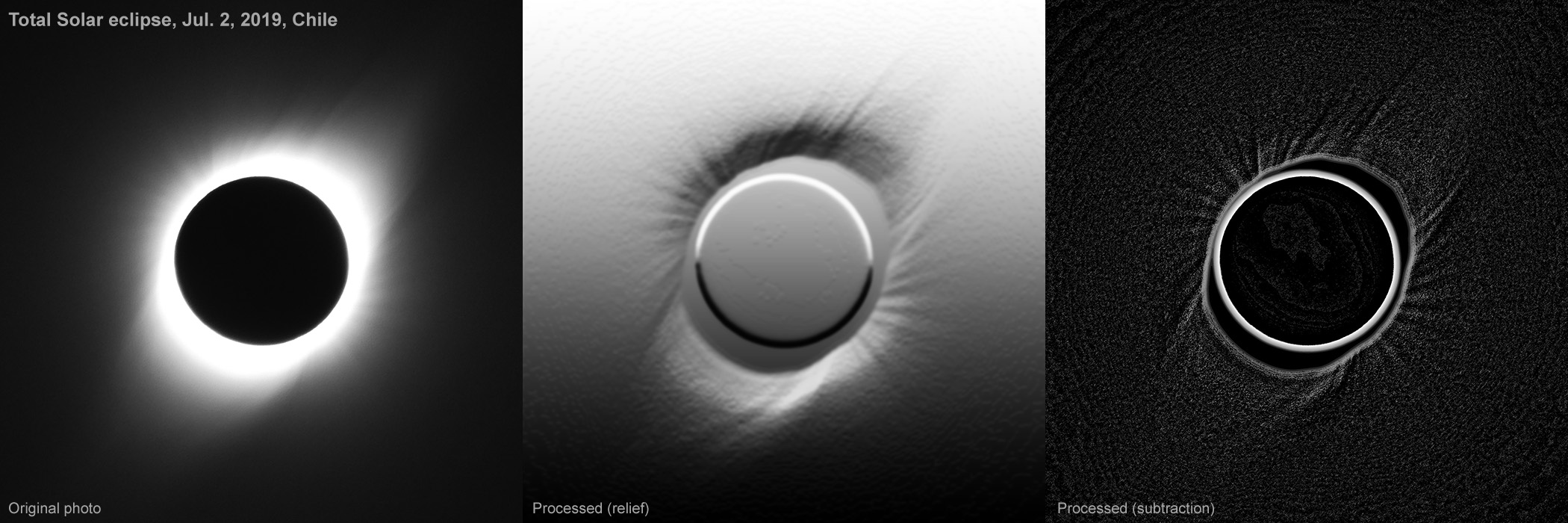
Solar corona, observed in ESO's La Silla Observatory in Chile

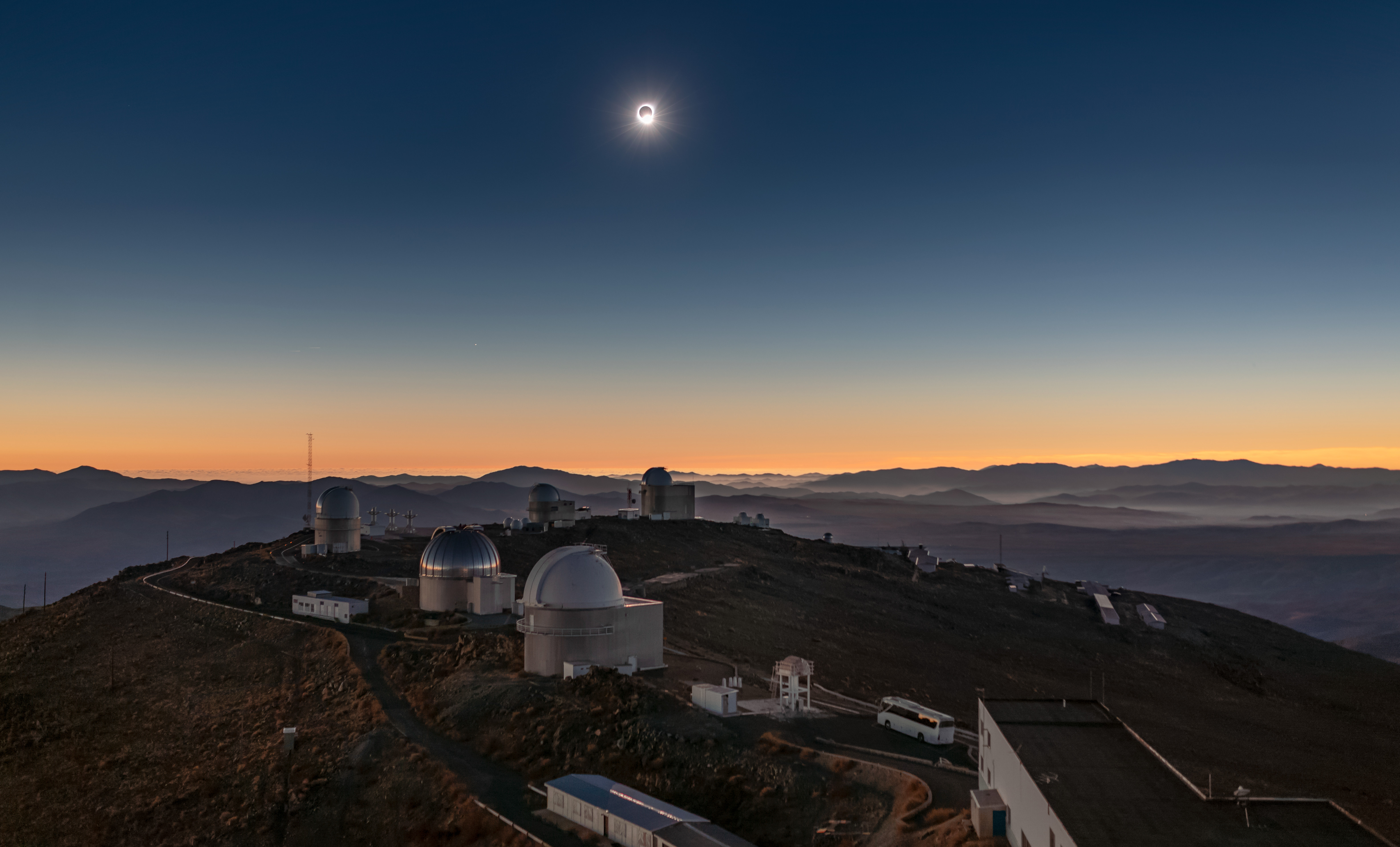
The total solar eclipse diamond ring from ESO's La Silla Observatory on July 2, 2019 at the moment when most of its face is occulted by the Moon. Image was taken by Mahdi Zamani by the NTT telescope viewpoint.

== Eclipse details ==
Shown below are two tables displaying details about this particular solar eclipse. The first table outlines times at which the Moon's penumbra or umbra attains the specific parameter, and the second table describes various other parameters pertaining to this eclipse.

July 2, 2019 Solar Eclipse Times
| Event | Time (UTC) |
|---|---|
| First Penumbral External Contact | 2019 July 2 at 16:56:22.9 UTC |
| First Umbral External Contact | 2019 July 2 at 18:02:19.5 UTC |
| First Central Line | 2019 July 2 at 18:03:29.5 UTC |
| First Umbral Internal Contact | 2019 July 2 at 18:04:39.8 UTC |
| Ecliptic Conjunction | 2019 July 2 at 19:17:21.9 UTC |
| Equatorial Conjunction | 2019 July 2 at 19:22:51.0 UTC |
| Greatest Eclipse | 2019 July 2 at 19:24:07.5 UTC |
| Greatest Duration | 2019 July 2 at 19:25:18.8 UTC |
| Last Umbral Internal Contact | 2019 July 2 at 20:43:33.5 UTC |
| Last Central Line | 2019 July 2 at 20:44:46.0 UTC |
| Last Umbral External Contact | 2019 July 2 at 20:45:58.2 UTC |
| Last Penumbral External Contact | 2019 July 2 at 21:51:48.1 UTC |

July 2, 2019 Solar Eclipse Parameters
| Parameter | Value |
|---|---|
| Eclipse Magnitude | 1.04593 |
| Eclipse Obscuration | 1.09398 |
| Gamma | −0.64656 |
| Sun Right Ascension | 06h46m14.8s |
| Sun Declination | +23°00'36.4" |
| Sun Semi-Diameter | 15'43.8" |
| Sun Equatorial Horizontal Parallax | 08.6" |
| Moon Right Ascension | 06h46m17.9s |
| Moon Declination | +22°22'09.2" |
| Moon Semi-Diameter | 16'14.9" |
| Moon Equatorial Horizontal Parallax | 0°59'37.8" |
| ΔT | 69.6 s |

== Eclipse season ==
This eclipse is part of an eclipse season, a period, roughly every six months, when eclipses occur. Only two (or occasionally three) eclipse seasons occur each year, and each season lasts about 35 days and repeats just short of six months (173 days) later; thus two full eclipse seasons always occur each year. Either two or three eclipses happen each eclipse season. In the sequence below, each eclipse is separated by a fortnight.

Eclipse season of July 2019
| July 2 Ascending node (new moon) | July 16 Descending node (full moon) |
|---|---|
| Total solar eclipse Solar Saros 127 | Partial lunar eclipse Lunar Saros 139 |

== Related eclipses ==
=== Eclipses in 2019 ===
- A partial solar eclipse on January 6.
- A total lunar eclipse on January 21.
- A total solar eclipse on July 2.
- A partial lunar eclipse on July 16.
- An annular solar eclipse on December 26.

=== Metonic ===
- Preceded by: Solar eclipse of September 13, 2015
- Followed by: Solar eclipse of April 20, 2023

=== Tzolkinex ===
- Preceded by: Solar eclipse of May 20, 2012
- Followed by: Solar eclipse of August 12, 2026

=== Half-Saros ===
- Preceded by: Lunar eclipse of June 26, 2010
- Followed by: Lunar eclipse of July 6, 2028

=== Tritos ===
- Preceded by: Solar eclipse of August 1, 2008
- Followed by: Solar eclipse of June 1, 2030

=== Solar Saros 127 ===
- Preceded by: Solar eclipse of June 21, 2001
- Followed by: Solar eclipse of July 13, 2037

=== Inex ===
- Preceded by: Solar eclipse of July 22, 1990
- Followed by: Solar eclipse of June 11, 2048

=== Triad ===
- Preceded by: Solar eclipse of August 31, 1932
- Followed by: Solar eclipse of May 3, 2106

=== Solar eclipses of 2018–2021 ===
This eclipse is a member of a semester series. An eclipse in a semester series of solar eclipses repeats approximately every 177 days and 4 hours (a semester) at alternating nodes of the Moon's orbit.

The partial solar eclipses on February 15, 2018 and August 11, 2018 occur in the previous lunar year eclipse set.

Solar eclipse series sets from 2018 to 2021
| Ascending node | | | Descending node | | |
| Saros | Map | Gamma | Saros | Map | Gamma |
| 117 Partial in Melbourne, Australia | July 13, 2018 Partial | −1.35423 | 122 Partial in Nakhodka, Russia | January 6, 2019 Partial | 1.14174 |
| 127 Totality in La Serena, Chile | July 2, 2019 Total | −0.64656 | 132 Annularity in Jaffna, Sri Lanka | December 26, 2019 Annular | 0.41351 |
| 137 Annularity in Beigang, Yunlin, Taiwan | June 21, 2020 Annular | 0.12090 | 142 Totality in Gorbea, Chile | December 14, 2020 Total | −0.29394 |
| 147 Partial in Halifax, Canada | June 10, 2021 Annular | 0.91516 | 152 From HMS Protector off South Georgia | December 4, 2021 Total | −0.95261 |

=== Saros 127 ===
This eclipse is a part of Saros series 127, repeating every 18 years, 11 days, and containing 82 events. The series started with a partial solar eclipse on October 10, 991 AD. It contains total eclipses from May 14, 1352 through August 15, 2091. There are no annular or hybrid eclipses in this set. The series ends at member 82 as a partial eclipse on March 21, 2452. Its eclipses are tabulated in three columns; every third eclipse in the same column is one exeligmos apart, so they all cast shadows over approximately the same parts of the Earth.

The longest duration of totality was produced by member 31 at 5 minutes, 40 seconds on August 30, 1532. All eclipses in this series occur at the Moon’s ascending node of orbit.

Series members 46–68 occur between 1801 and 2200:
| 46 | 47 | 48 |
|---|---|---|
| February 21, 1803 | March 4, 1821 | March 15, 1839 |
| 49 | 50 | 51 |
| March 25, 1857 | April 6, 1875 | April 16, 1893 |
| 52 | 53 | 54 |
| April 28, 1911 | May 9, 1929 | May 20, 1947 |
| 55 | 56 | 57 |
| May 30, 1965 | June 11, 1983 | June 21, 2001 |
| 58 | 59 | 60 |
| July 2, 2019 | July 13, 2037 | July 24, 2055 |
| 61 | 62 | 63 |
| August 3, 2073 | August 15, 2091 | August 26, 2109 |
| 64 | 65 | 66 |
| September 6, 2127 | September 16, 2145 | September 28, 2163 |
| 67 | 68 | |
| October 8, 2181 | October 19, 2199 | |

=== Metonic series ===
The metonic series repeats eclipses every 19 years (6939.69 days), lasting about 5 cycles. Eclipses occur in nearly the same calendar date. In addition, the octon subseries repeats 1/5 of that or every 3.8 years (1387.94 days). All eclipses in this table occur at the Moon's ascending node.

21 eclipse events between July 1, 2000 and July 1, 2076
| July 1–2 | April 19–20 | February 5–7 | November 24–25 | September 12–13 |
| 117 | 119 | 121 | 123 | 125 |
|---|---|---|---|---|
| July 1, 2000 | April 19, 2004 | February 7, 2008 | November 25, 2011 | September 13, 2015 |
| 127 | 129 | 131 | 133 | 135 |
| July 2, 2019 | April 20, 2023 | February 6, 2027 | November 25, 2030 | September 12, 2034 |
| 137 | 139 | 141 | 143 | 145 |
| July 2, 2038 | April 20, 2042 | February 5, 2046 | November 25, 2049 | September 12, 2053 |
| 147 | 149 | 151 | 153 | 155 |
| July 1, 2057 | April 20, 2061 | February 5, 2065 | November 24, 2068 | September 12, 2072 |
157
July 1, 2076

=== Tritos series ===
This eclipse is a part of a tritos cycle, repeating at alternating nodes every 135 synodic months (≈ 3986.63 days, or 11 years minus 1 month). Their appearance and longitude are irregular due to a lack of synchronization with the anomalistic month (period of perigee), but groupings of 3 tritos cycles (≈ 33 years minus 3 months) come close (≈ 434.044 anomalistic months), so eclipses are similar in these groupings.

Series members between 1801 and 2200
| March 14, 1801 (Saros 107) | February 12, 1812 (Saros 108) | January 12, 1823 (Saros 109) | | November 10, 1844 (Saros 111) |
| | | August 9, 1877 (Saros 114) | July 9, 1888 (Saros 115) | June 8, 1899 (Saros 116) |
| May 9, 1910 (Saros 117) | April 8, 1921 (Saros 118) | March 7, 1932 (Saros 119) | February 4, 1943 (Saros 120) | January 5, 1954 (Saros 121) |
| December 4, 1964 (Saros 122) | November 3, 1975 (Saros 123) | October 3, 1986 (Saros 124) | September 2, 1997 (Saros 125) | August 1, 2008 (Saros 126) |
| July 2, 2019 (Saros 127) | June 1, 2030 (Saros 128) | April 30, 2041 (Saros 129) | March 30, 2052 (Saros 130) | February 28, 2063 (Saros 131) |
| January 27, 2074 (Saros 132) | December 27, 2084 (Saros 133) | November 27, 2095 (Saros 134) | October 26, 2106 (Saros 135) | September 26, 2117 (Saros 136) |
| August 25, 2128 (Saros 137) | July 25, 2139 (Saros 138) | June 25, 2150 (Saros 139) | May 25, 2161 (Saros 140) | April 23, 2172 (Saros 141) |
| March 23, 2183 (Saros 142) | February 21, 2194 (Saros 143) | | | |

=== Inex series ===
This eclipse is a part of the long period inex cycle, repeating at alternating nodes, every 358 synodic months (≈ 10,571.95 days, or 29 years minus 20 days). Their appearance and longitude are irregular due to a lack of synchronization with the anomalistic month (period of perigee). However, groupings of 3 inex cycles (≈ 87 years minus 2 months) comes close (≈ 1,151.02 anomalistic months), so eclipses are similar in these groupings.

Series members between 1801 and 2200
| November 19, 1816 (Saros 120) | October 30, 1845 (Saros 121) | October 10, 1874 (Saros 122) |
| September 21, 1903 (Saros 123) | August 31, 1932 (Saros 124) | August 11, 1961 (Saros 125) |
| July 22, 1990 (Saros 126) | July 2, 2019 (Saros 127) | June 11, 2048 (Saros 128) |
| May 22, 2077 (Saros 129) | May 3, 2106 (Saros 130) | April 13, 2135 (Saros 131) |
| March 23, 2164 (Saros 132) | March 3, 2193 (Saros 133) | |

== Additional sources ==
- Earth visibility chart and eclipse statistics Eclipse Predictions by Fred Espenak, NASA/GSFC
  - Google interactive map
  - Besselian elements
