= July 2019 lunar eclipse =

Lunar Eclipse 17 July 2019

- Partial eclipse
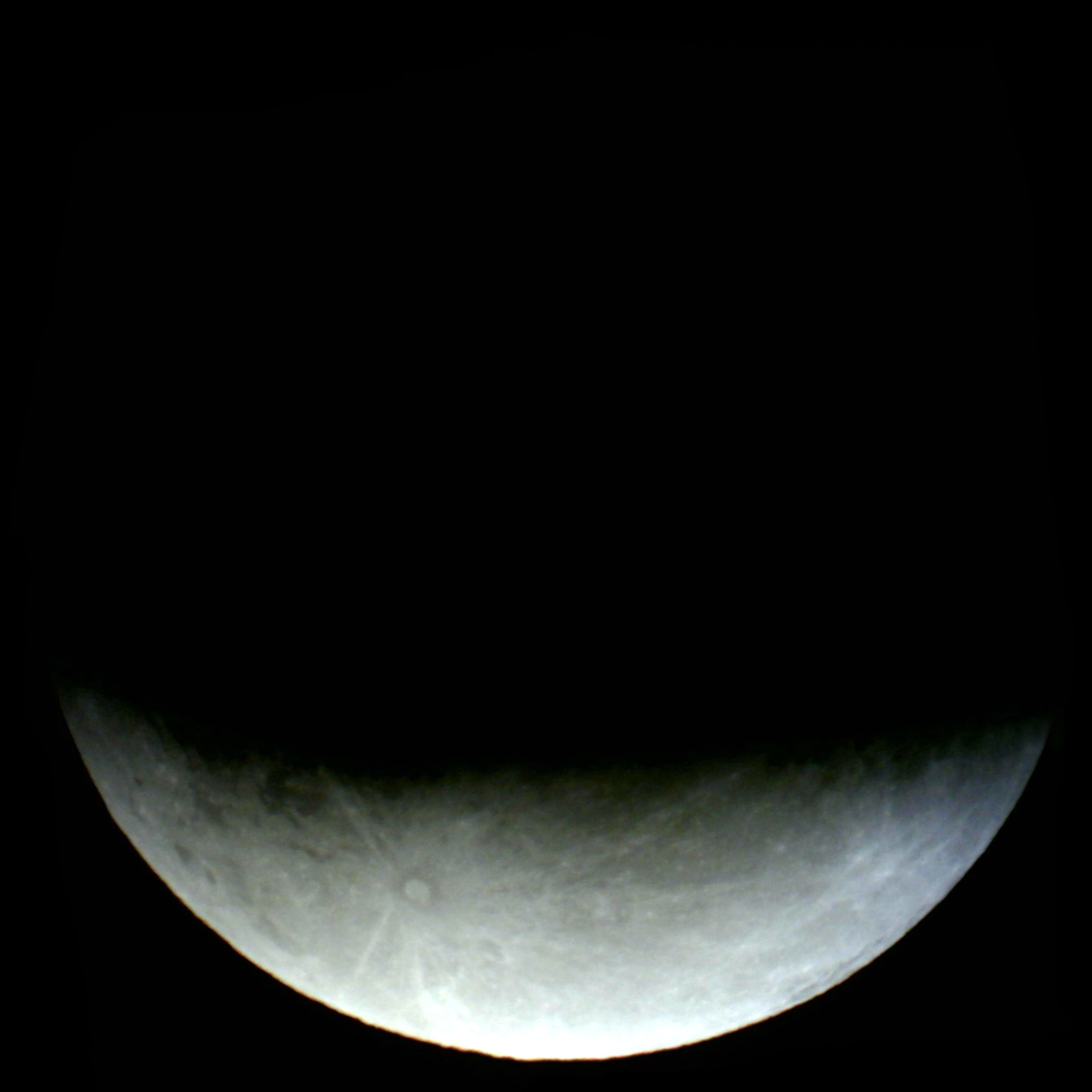
- Near greatest eclipse from Tilehurst, England, 21:30 UTC
- Date: July 16, 2019
- Gamma: −0.643
- Magnitude: 0.6544
- Saros cycle: 139 (22 of 81)
- Partiality: 177 minutes, 56 seconds
- Penumbral: 333 minutes, 43 seconds
Contacts (UTC)
- P1: 18:43:53
- U1: 20:01:43
- Greatest: 21:30:44
- U4: 22:59:39
- P4: 0:17:36

A partial lunar eclipse occurred at the Moon's descending node of orbit on Tuesday, July 16, 2019, with an umbral magnitude of 0.6544. A lunar eclipse occurs when the Moon moves into the Earth's shadow, causing the Moon to be darkened. A partial lunar eclipse occurs when one part of the Moon is in the Earth's umbra, while the other part is in the Earth's penumbra. Unlike a solar eclipse, which can only be viewed from a relatively small area of the world, a lunar eclipse may be viewed from anywhere on the night side of Earth. Occurring about 3.9 days after apogee (on July 20, 2019, at 20:00 UTC), the Moon's apparent diameter was smaller.

== Visibility ==
The eclipse was completely visible over Africa, eastern Europe, Antarctica, and west, central, and south Asia, seen rising over the South America, western Europe, and west Africa, and setting over east Asia and Australia.

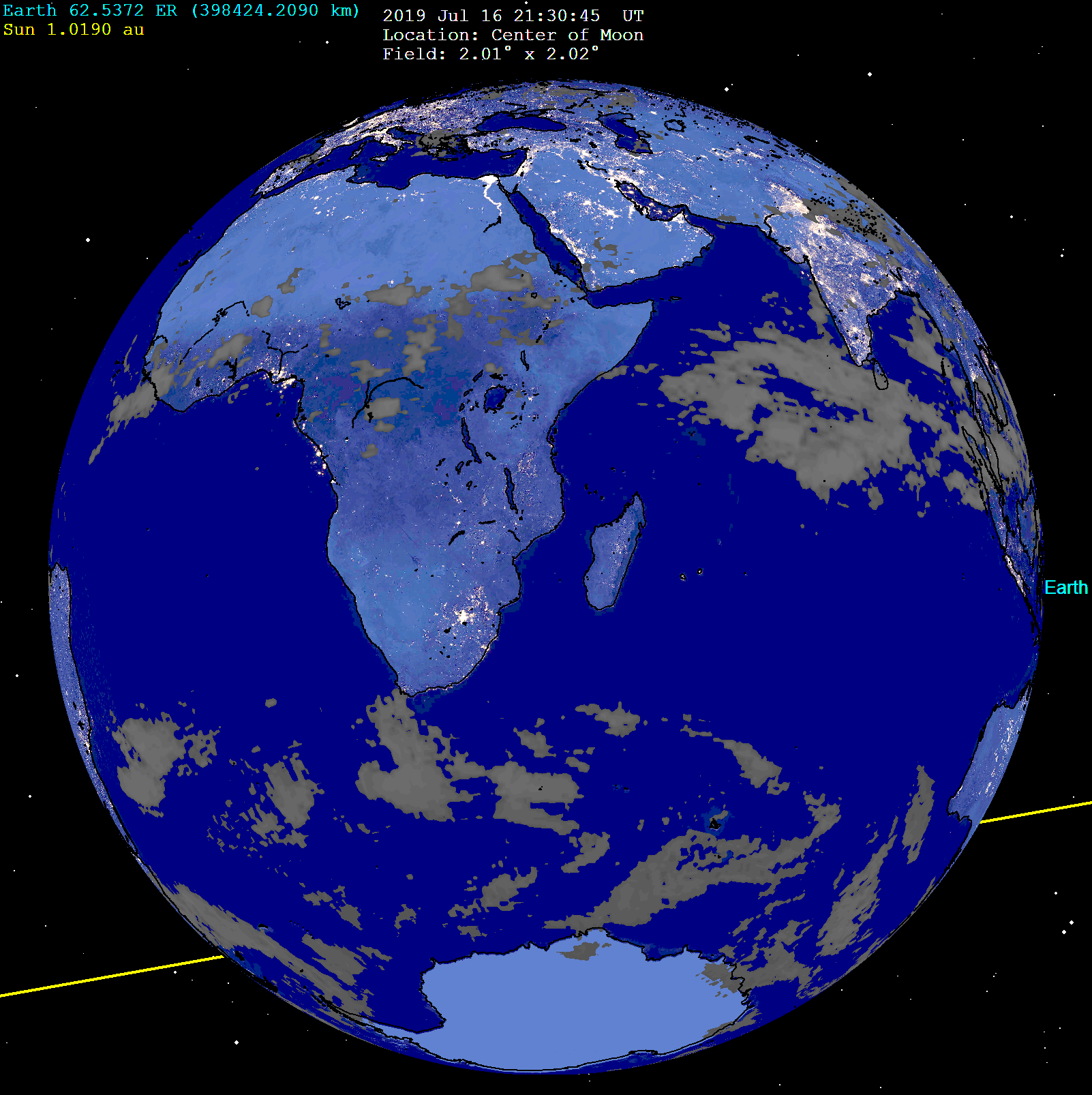
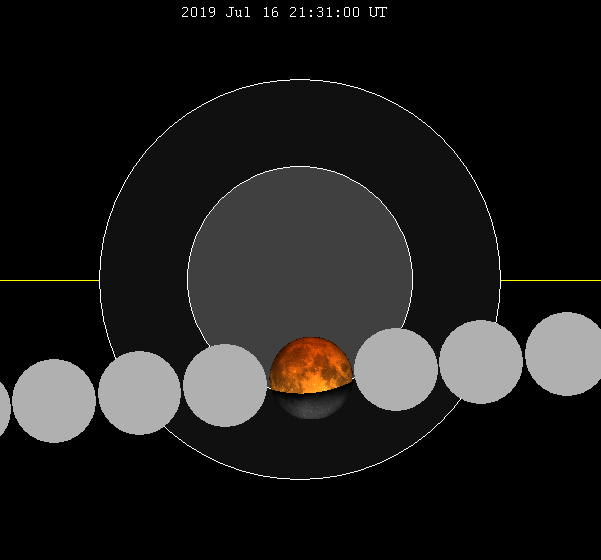
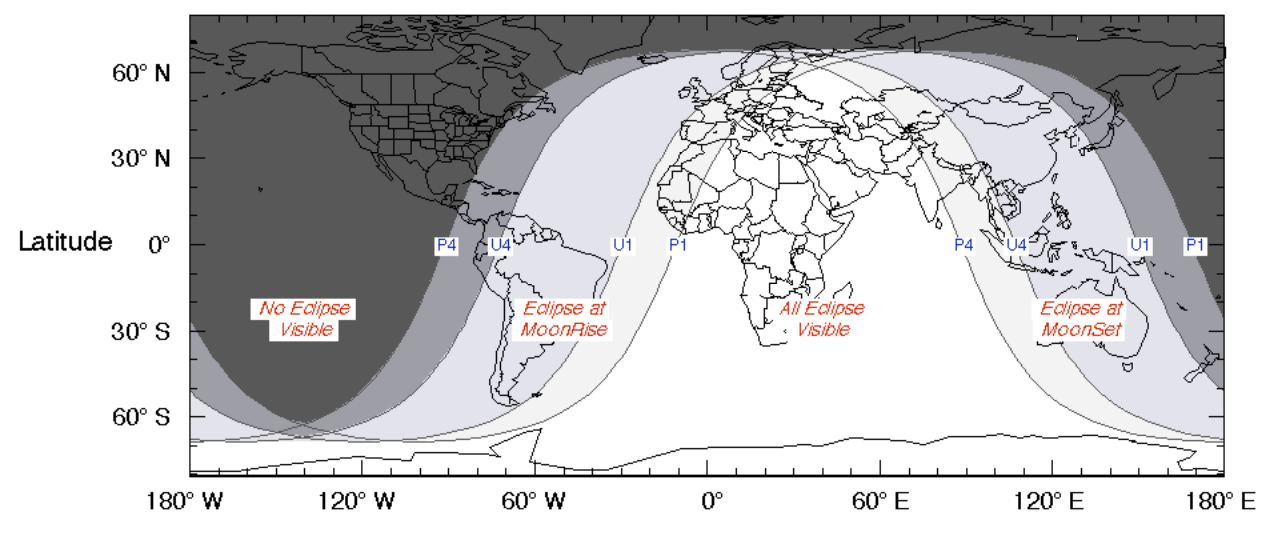
Visibility map

== Gallery ==
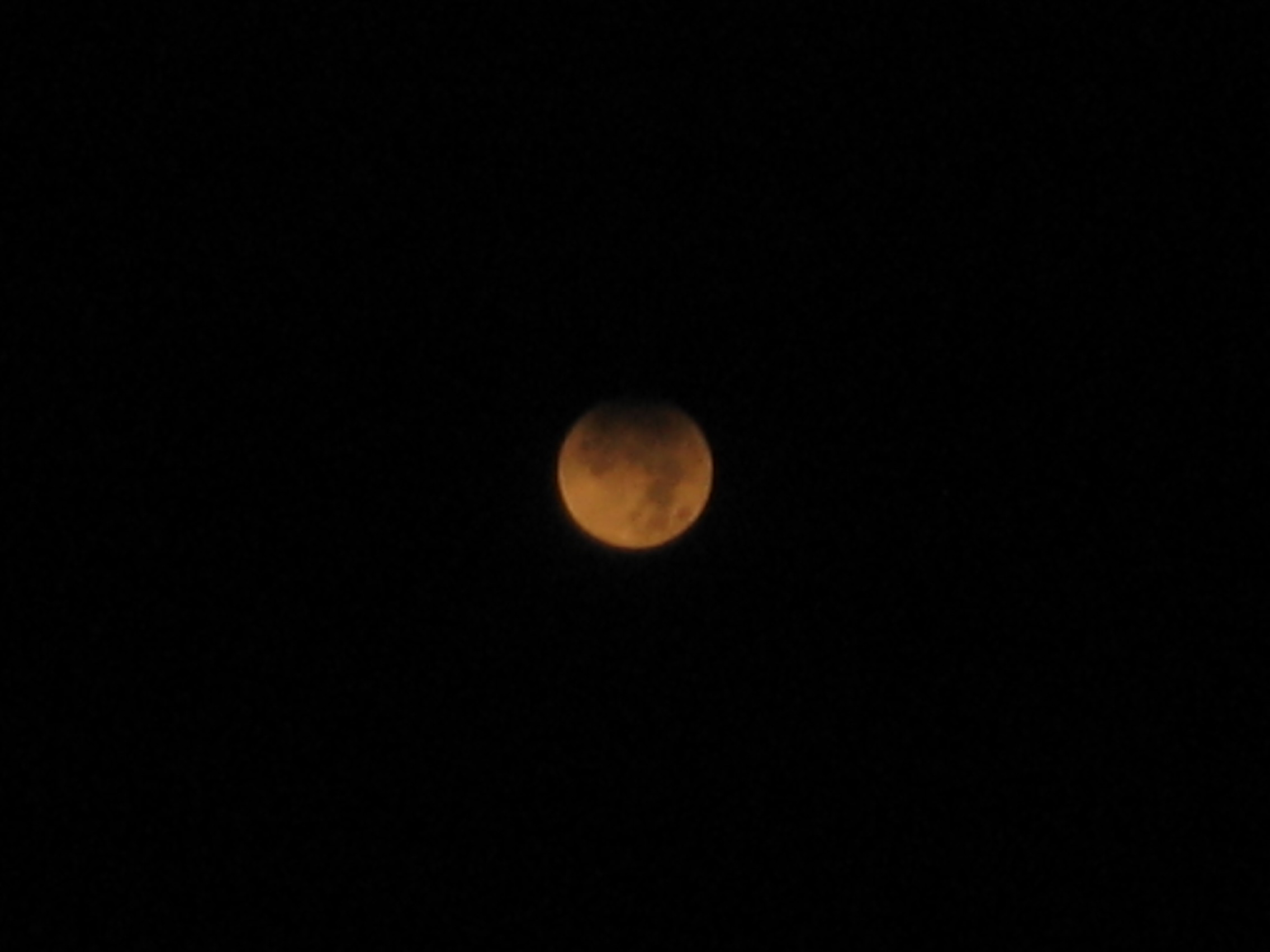
Hefei, China, 19:56 UTC

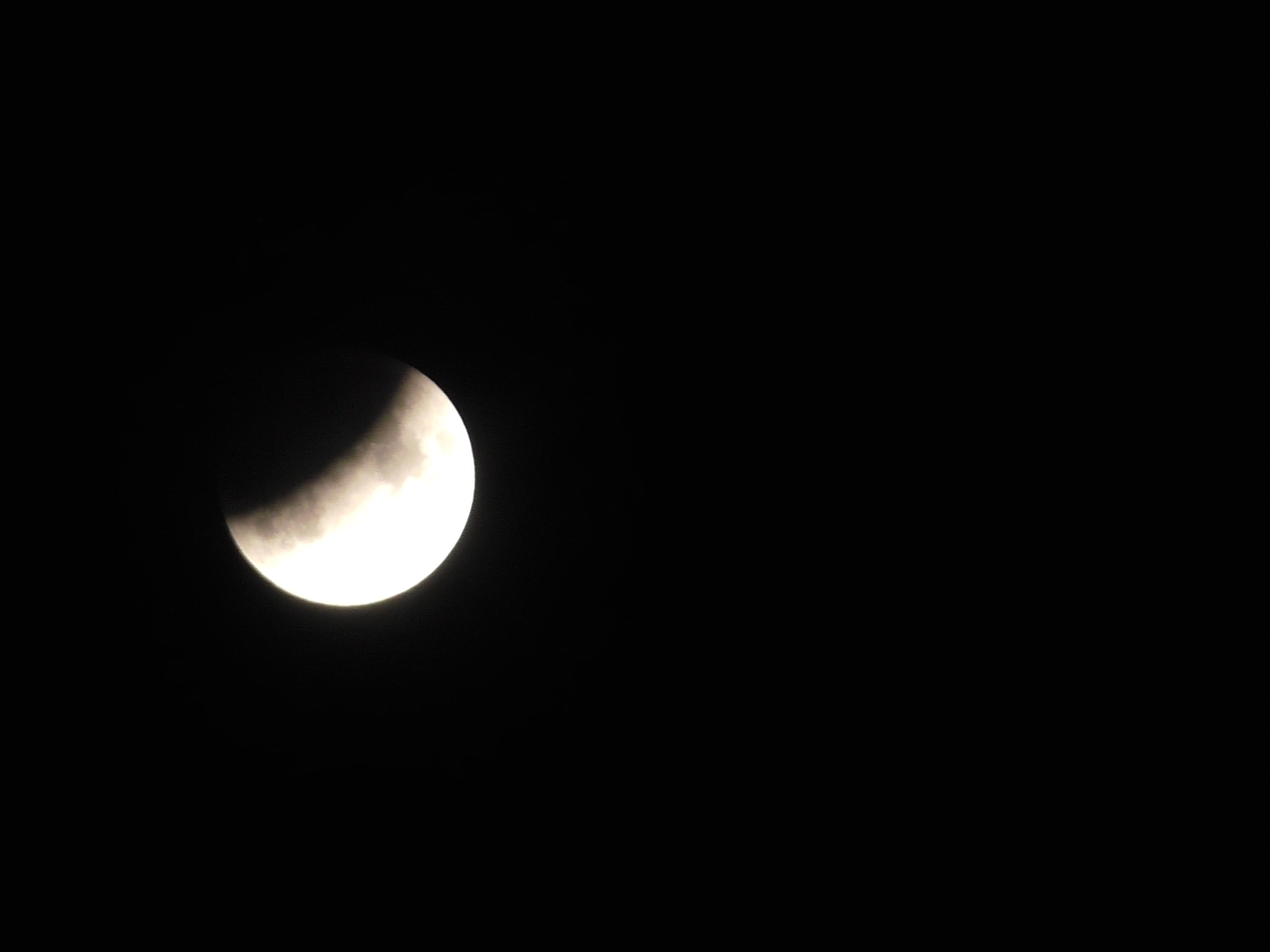
Mariupol, Ukraine, 20:25 UTC

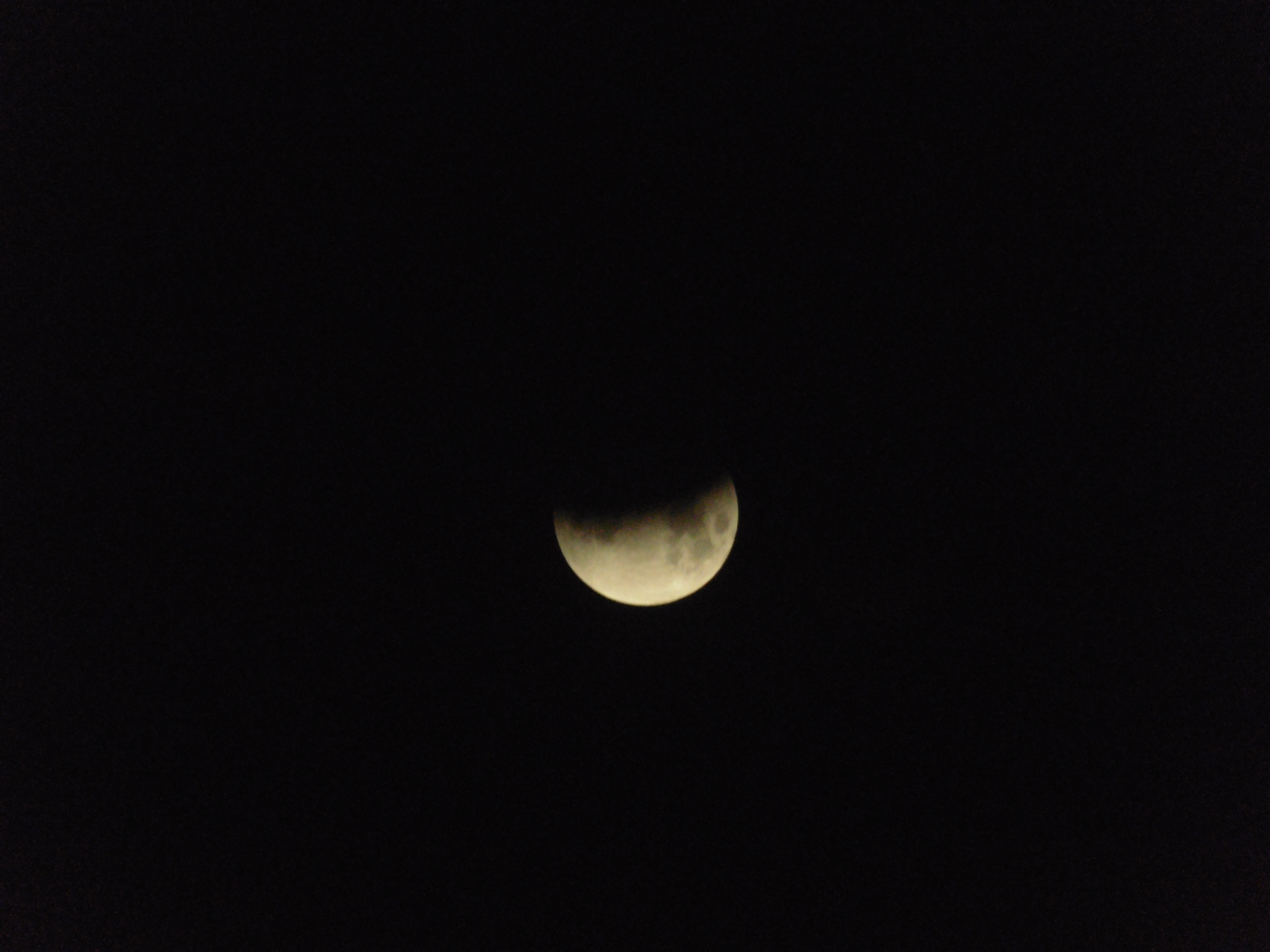
Tashkent, Uzbekistan, 21:05 UTC

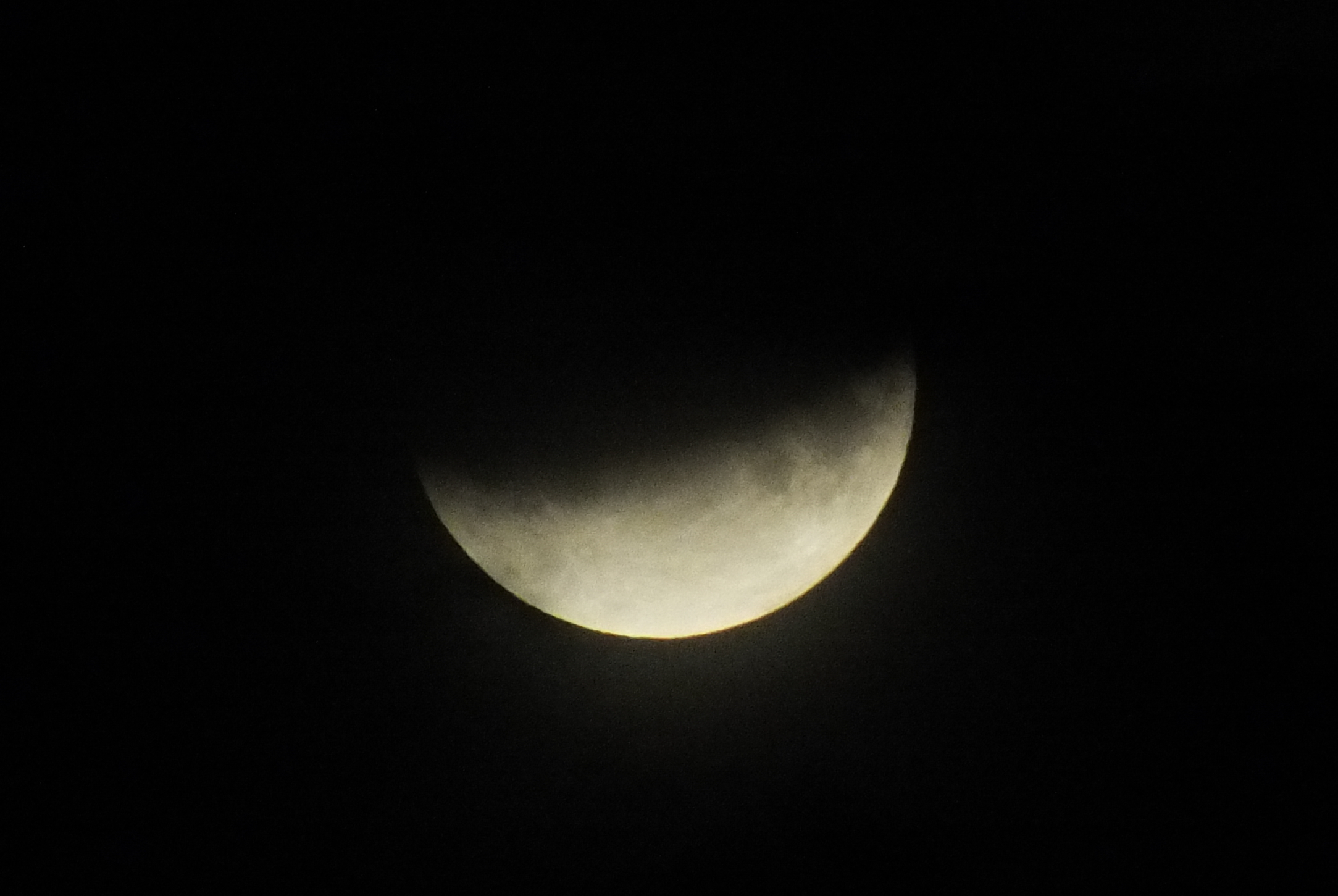
Moscow, Russia, 21:11 UTC

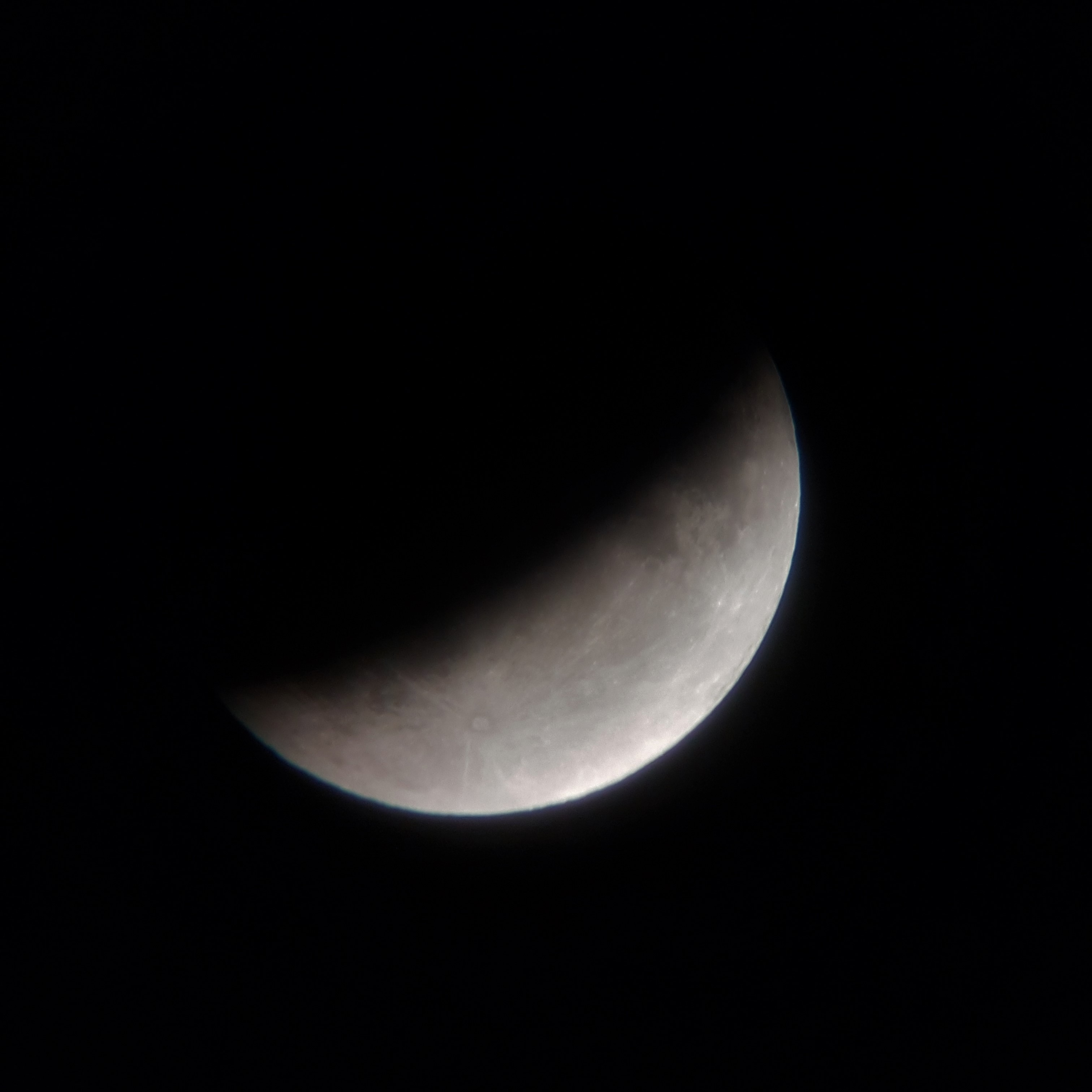
Novate Milanese, Italy, 21:17 UTC

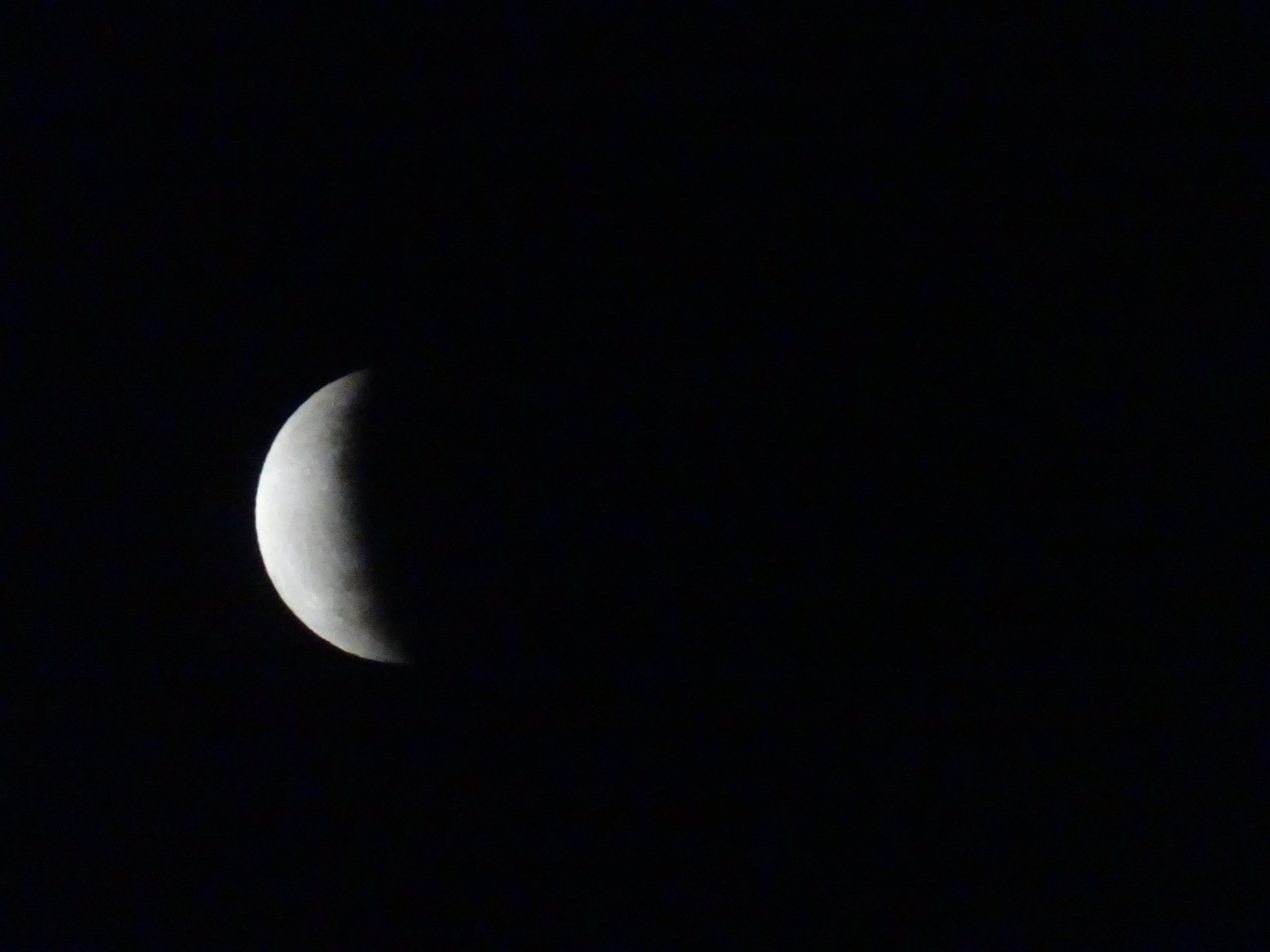
Bandung, Indonesia, 21:20 UTC

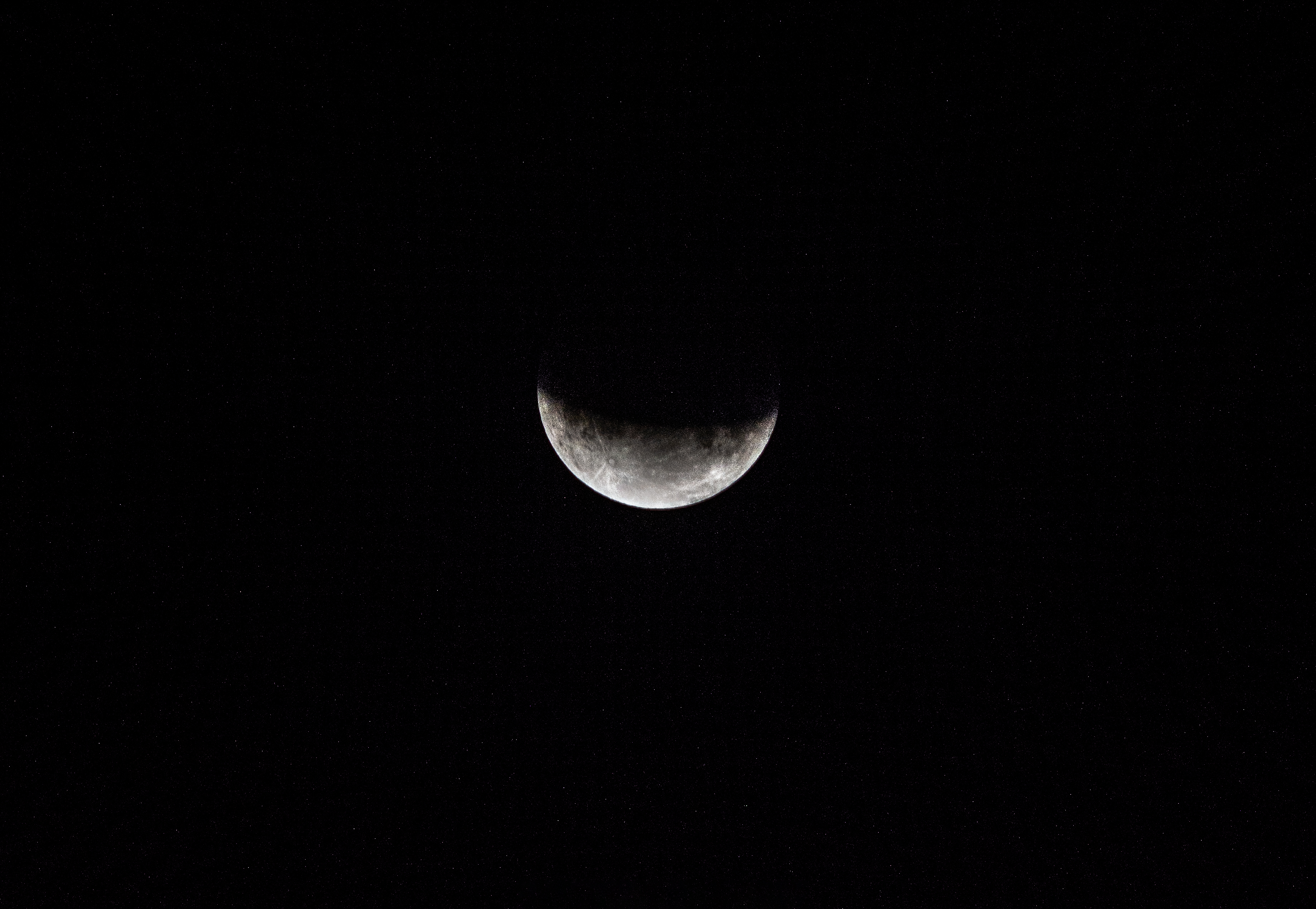
Farasan Island, Saudi Arabia, 21:25 UTC

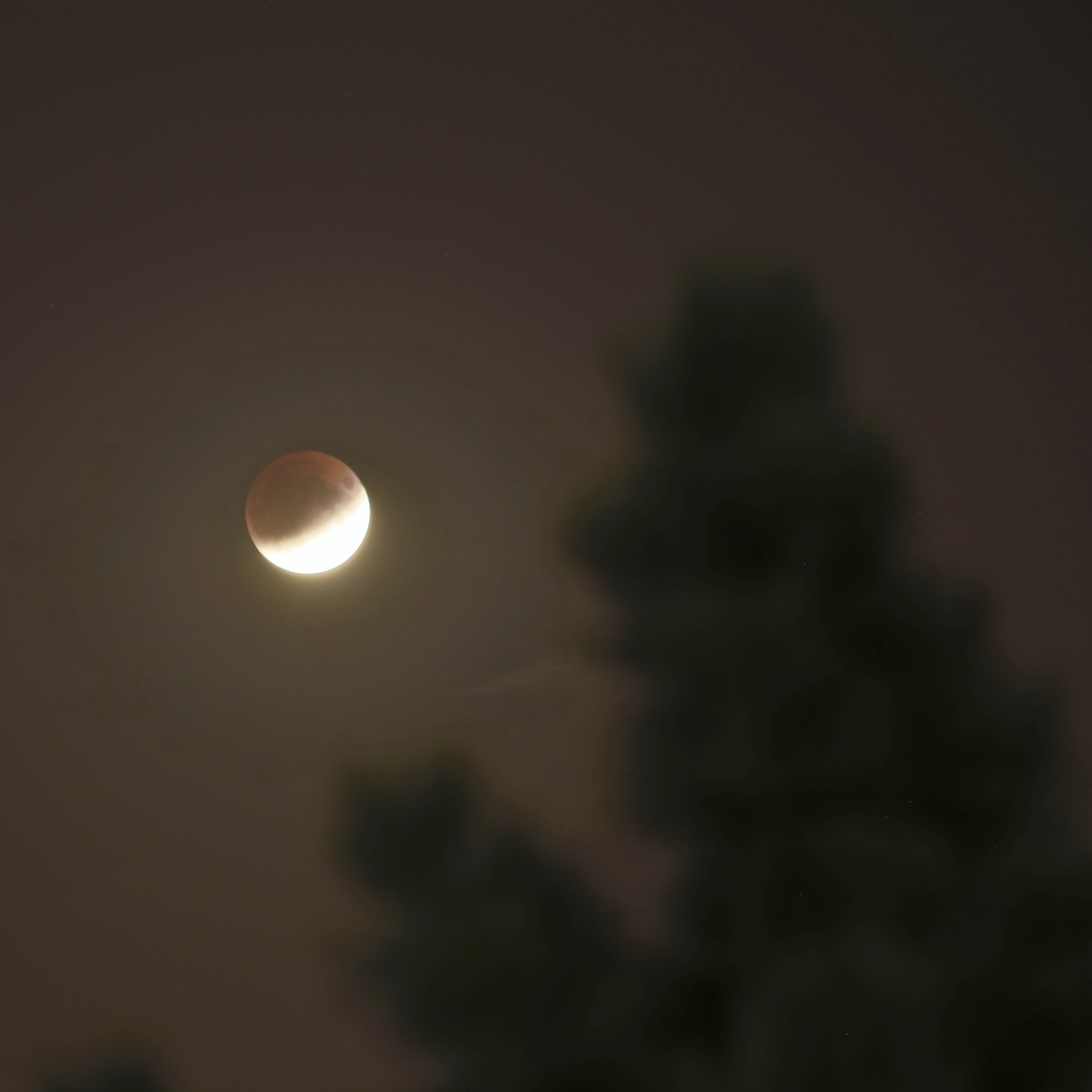
Paris, France, 21:27 UTC

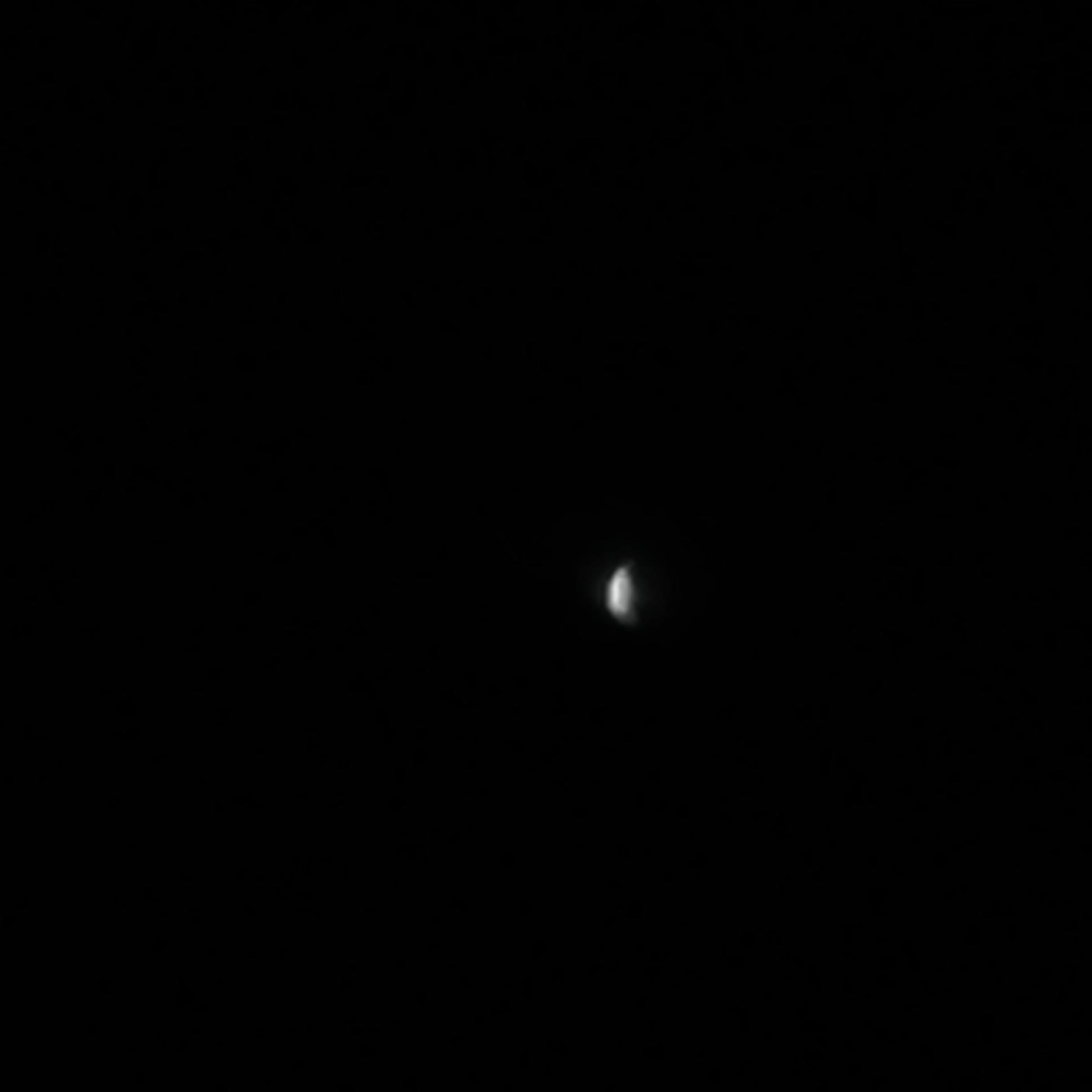
Kuala Lumpur, Malaysia, 21:30 UTC

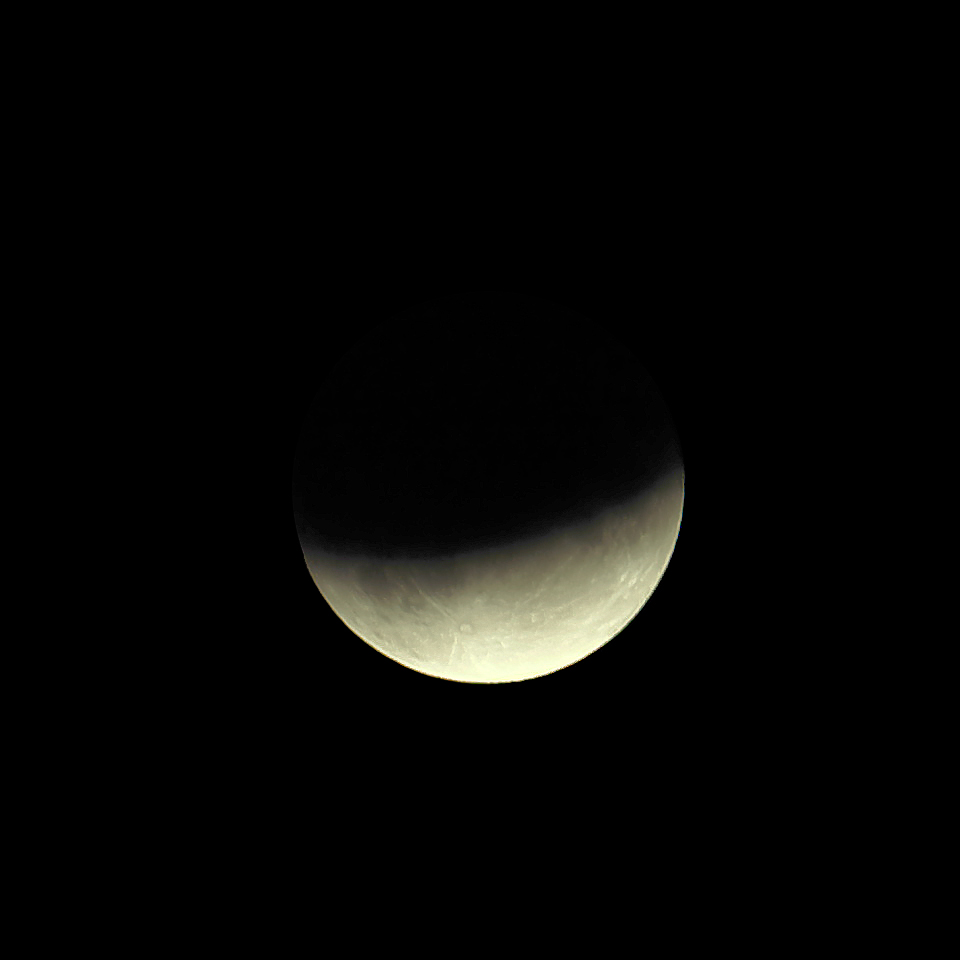
Munich, Germany, 21:36 UTC

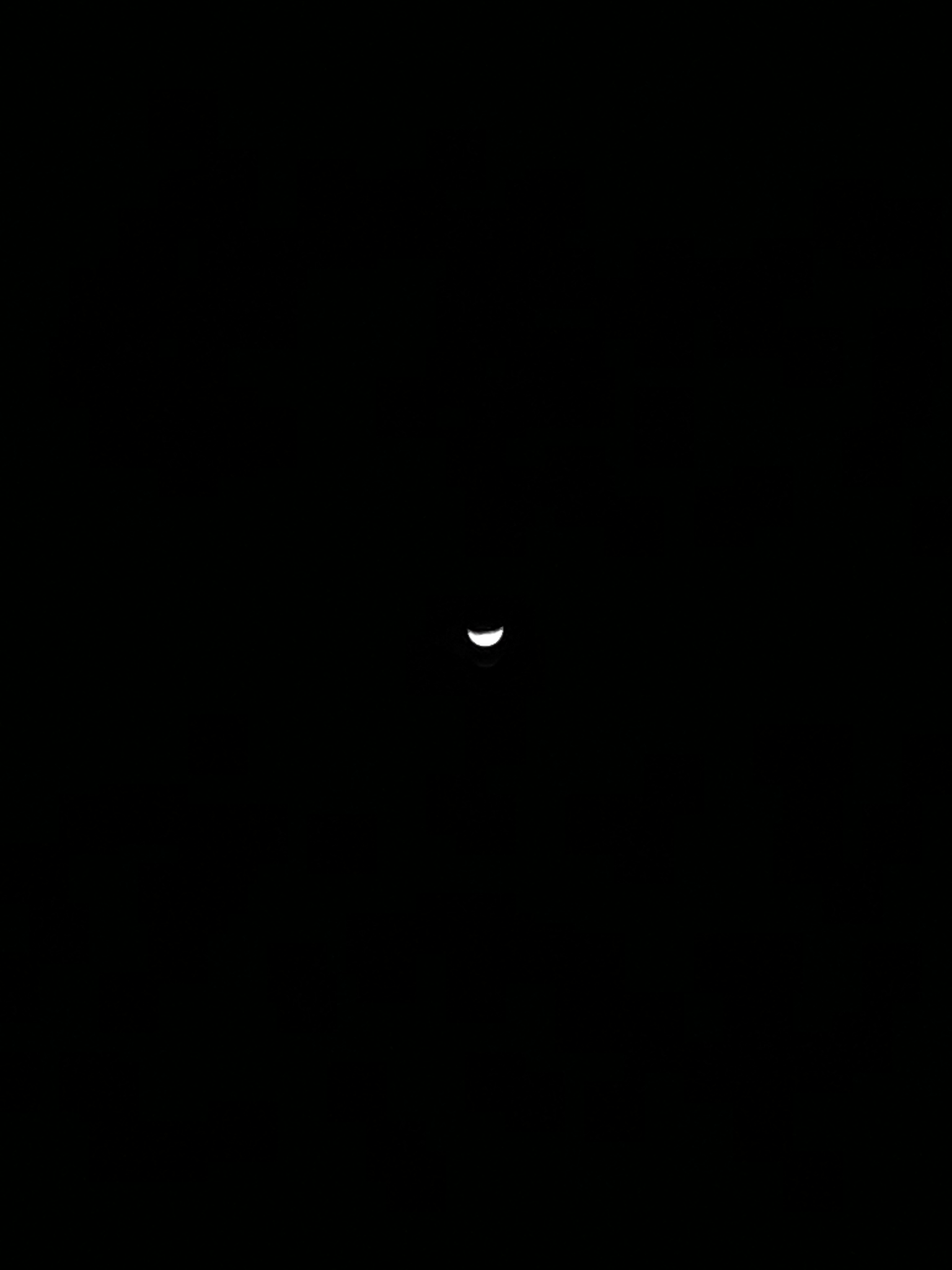
Prague, Czech Republic, 21:39 UTC

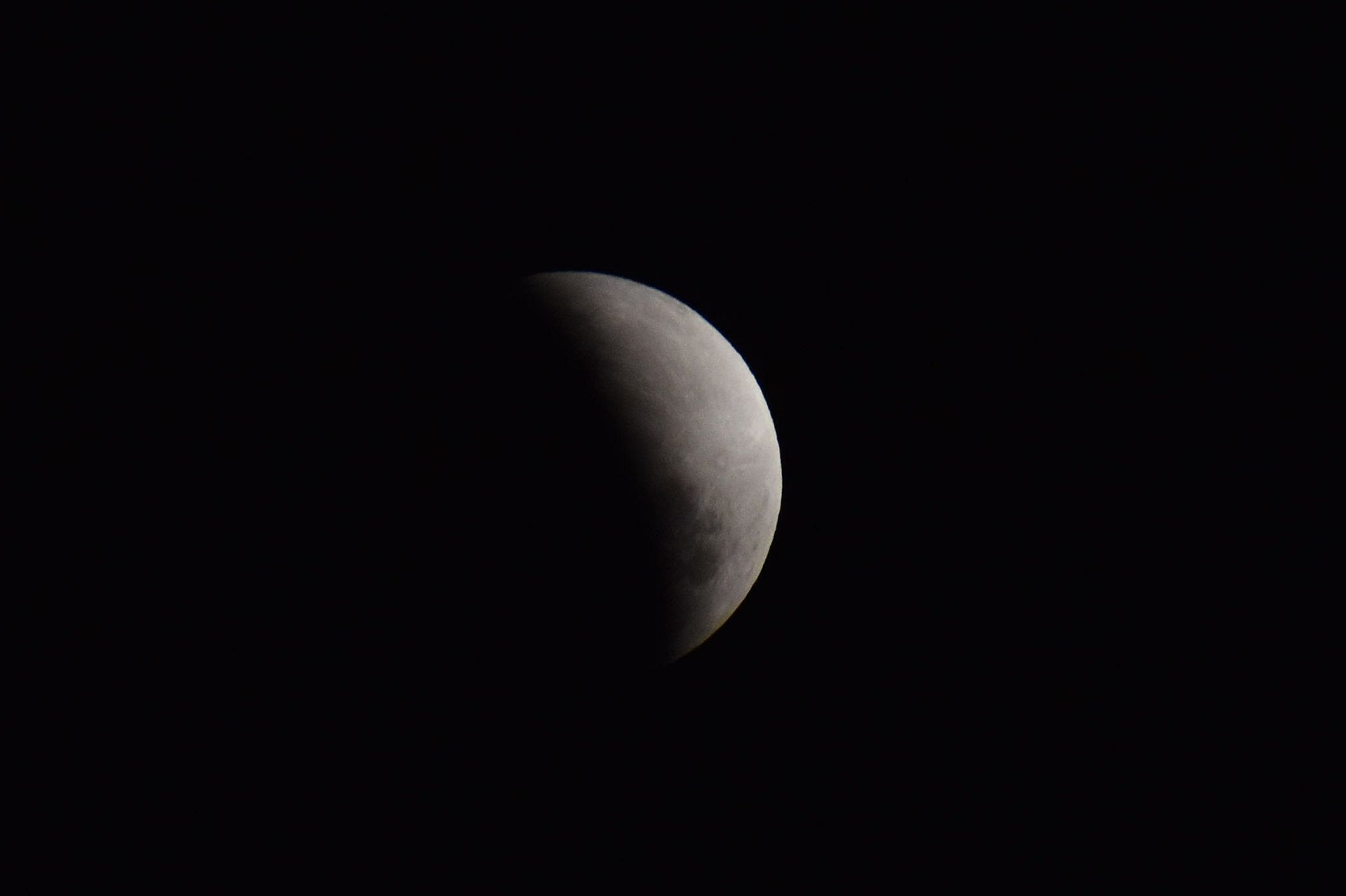
Manuel B. Gonnet, Argentina, 21:43 UTC

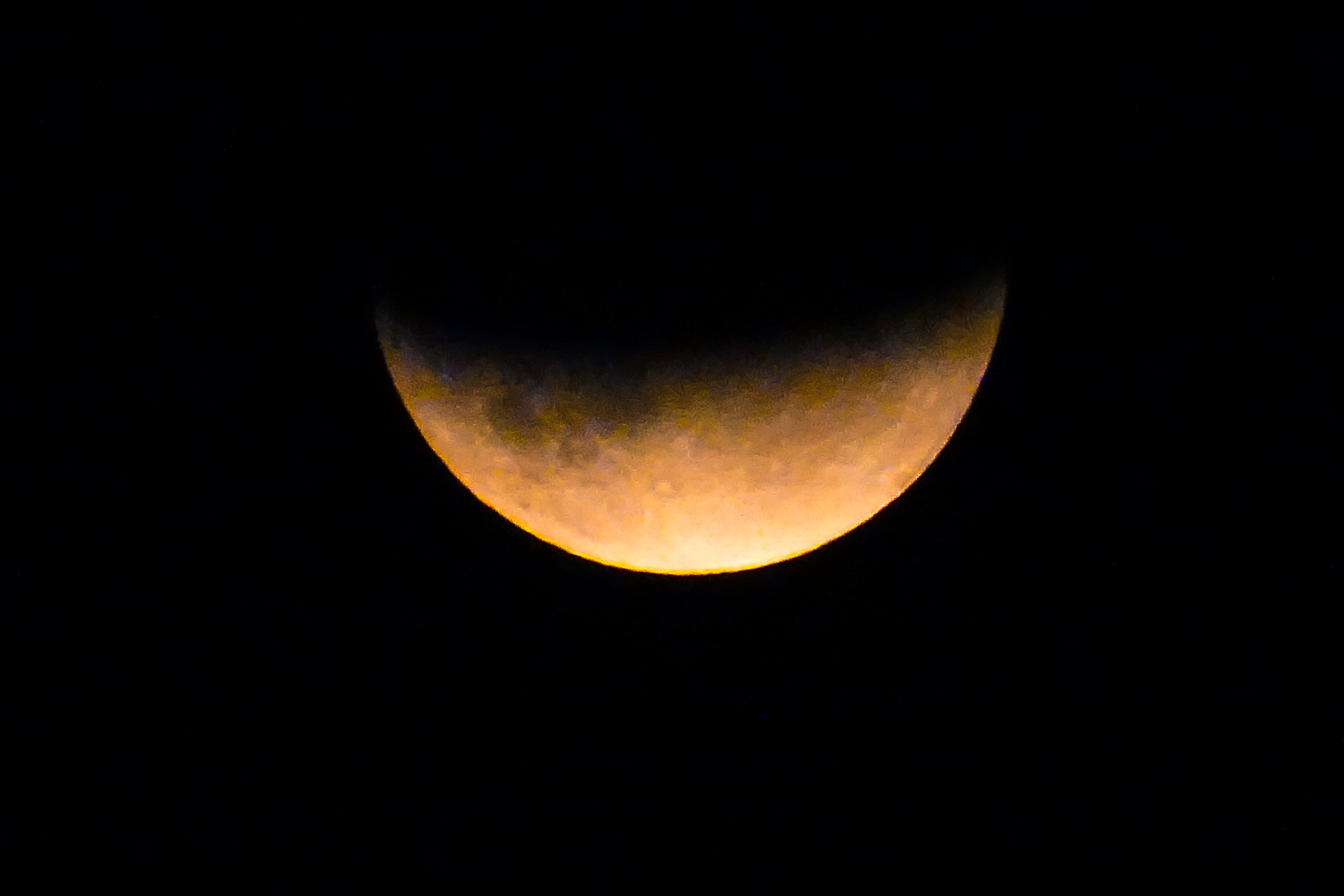
London, England, 21:47 UTC

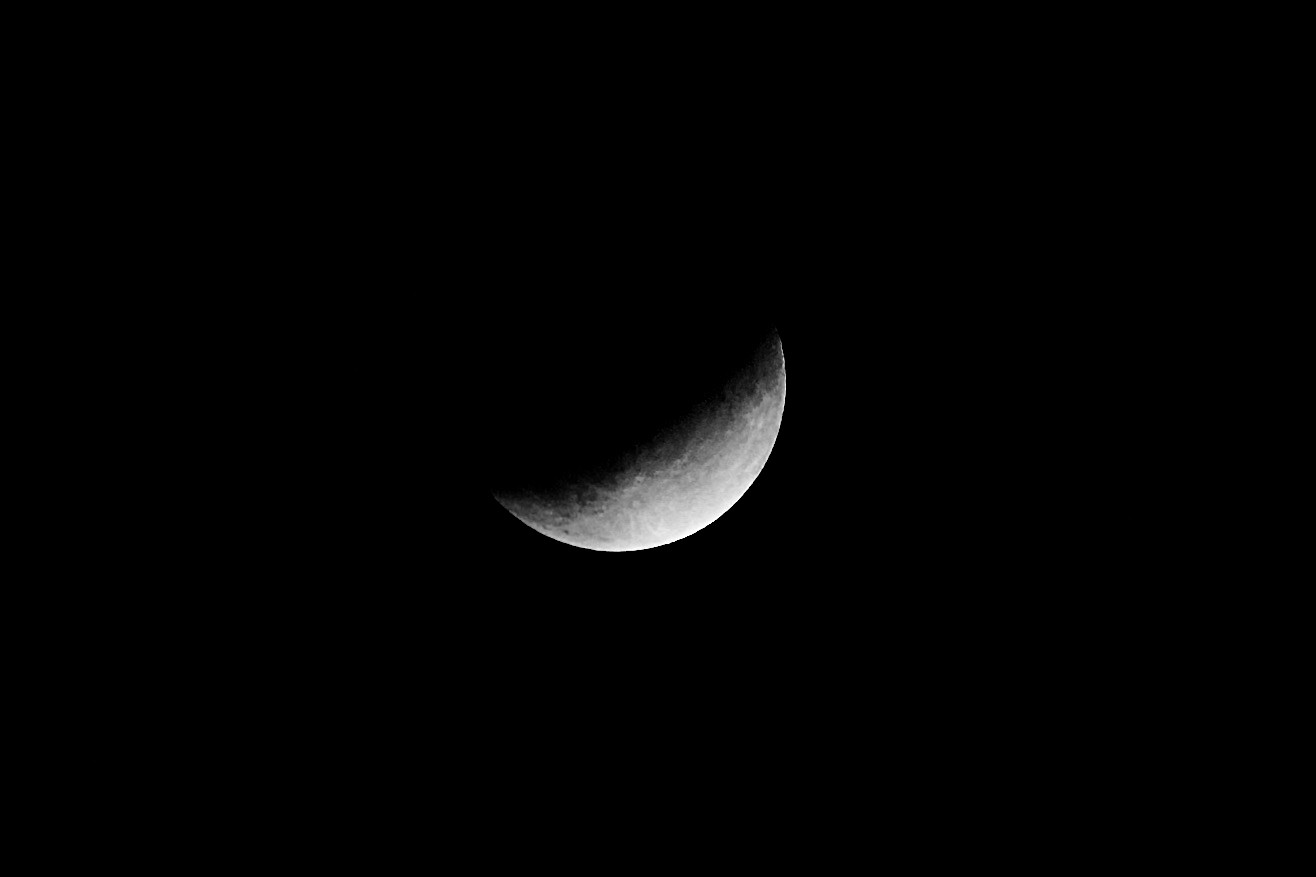
Sayada, Tunisia, 21:55 UTC

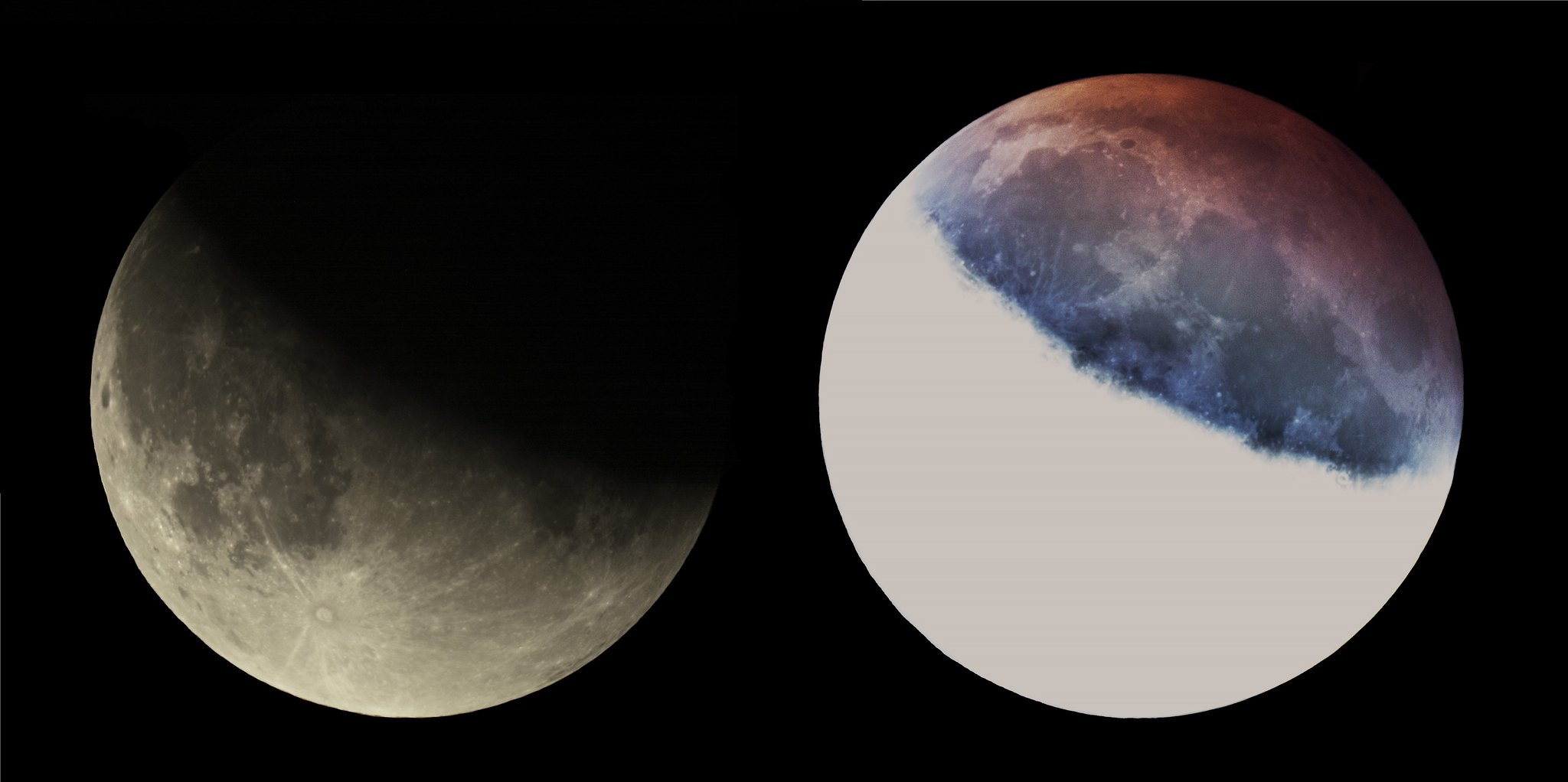
Virovitica, Croatia, 22:12 UTC

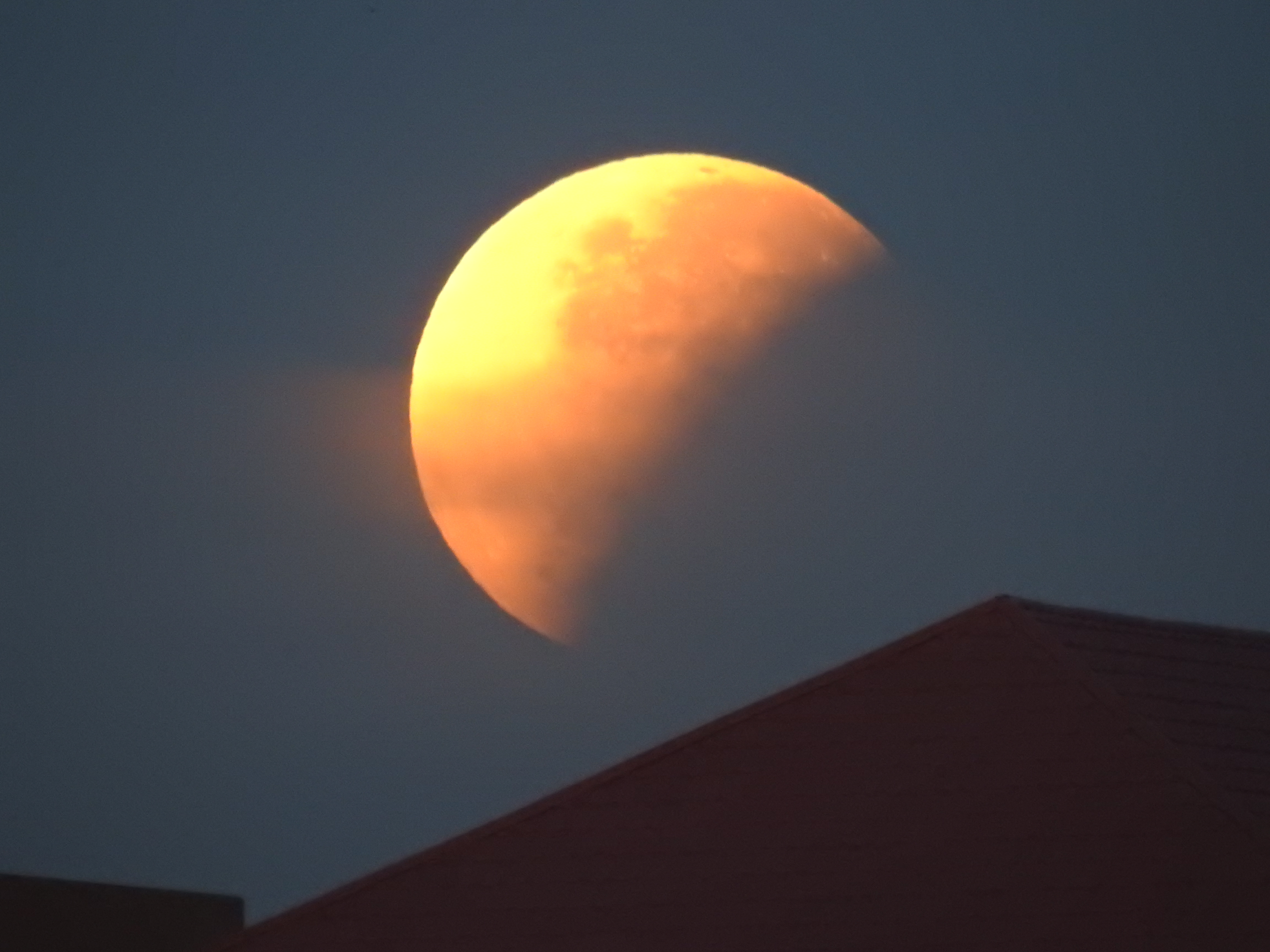
Banjarmasin, Indonesia, Near Moonset, 22:17 UTC

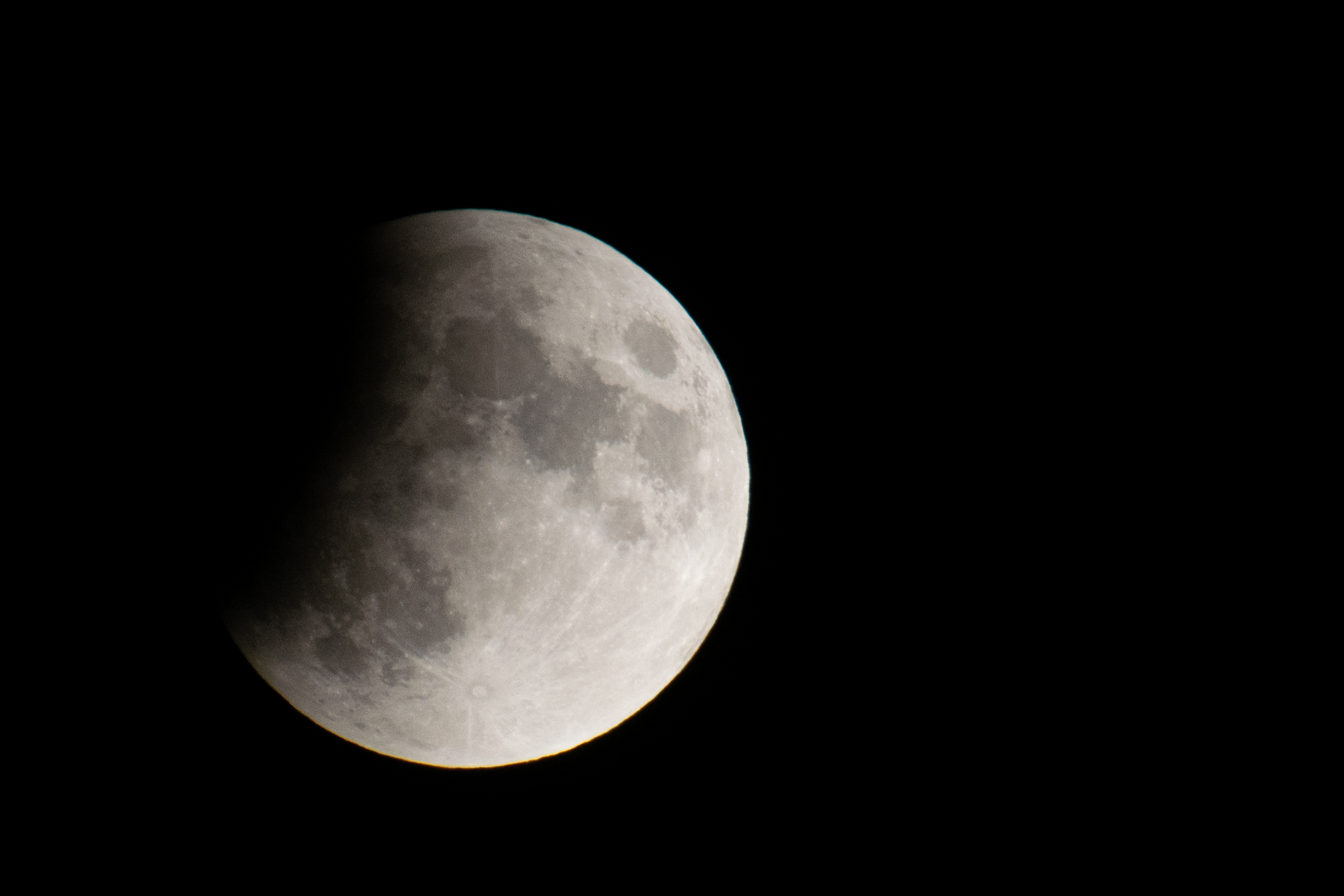
Krško, Slovenia, 22:19 UTC

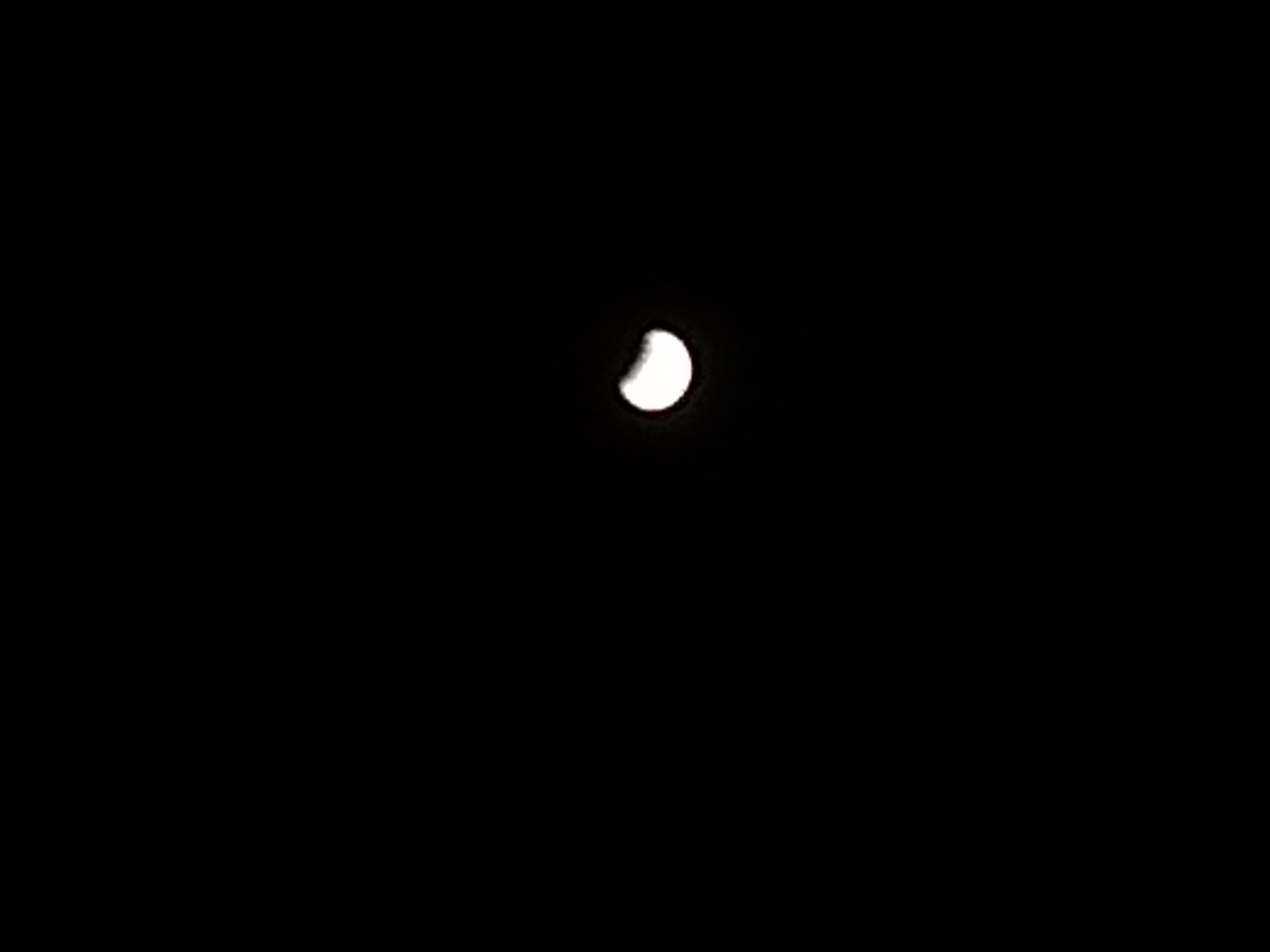
Szanda, Hungary, 22:23 UTC

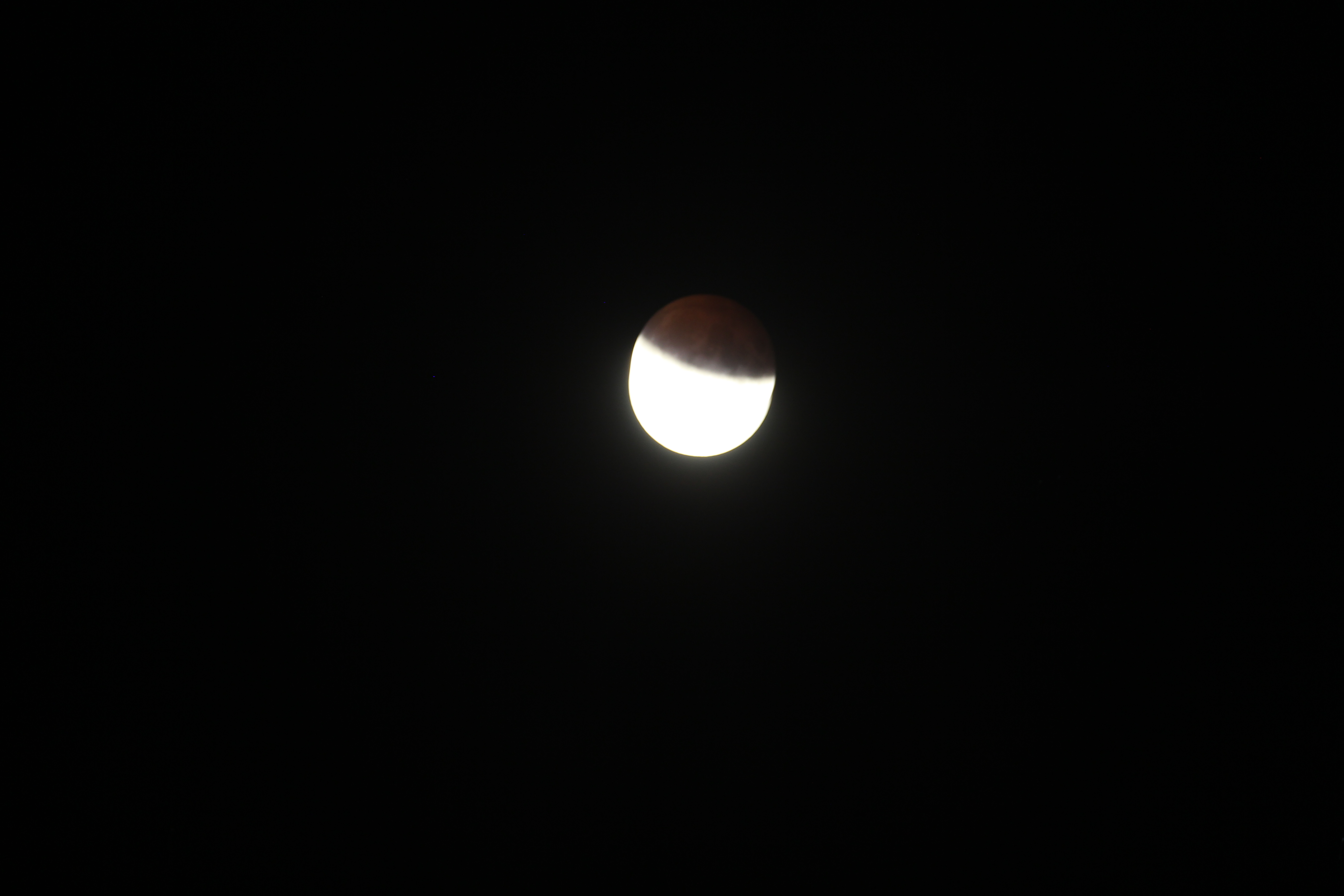
Wrocław, Poland, 22:27 UTC

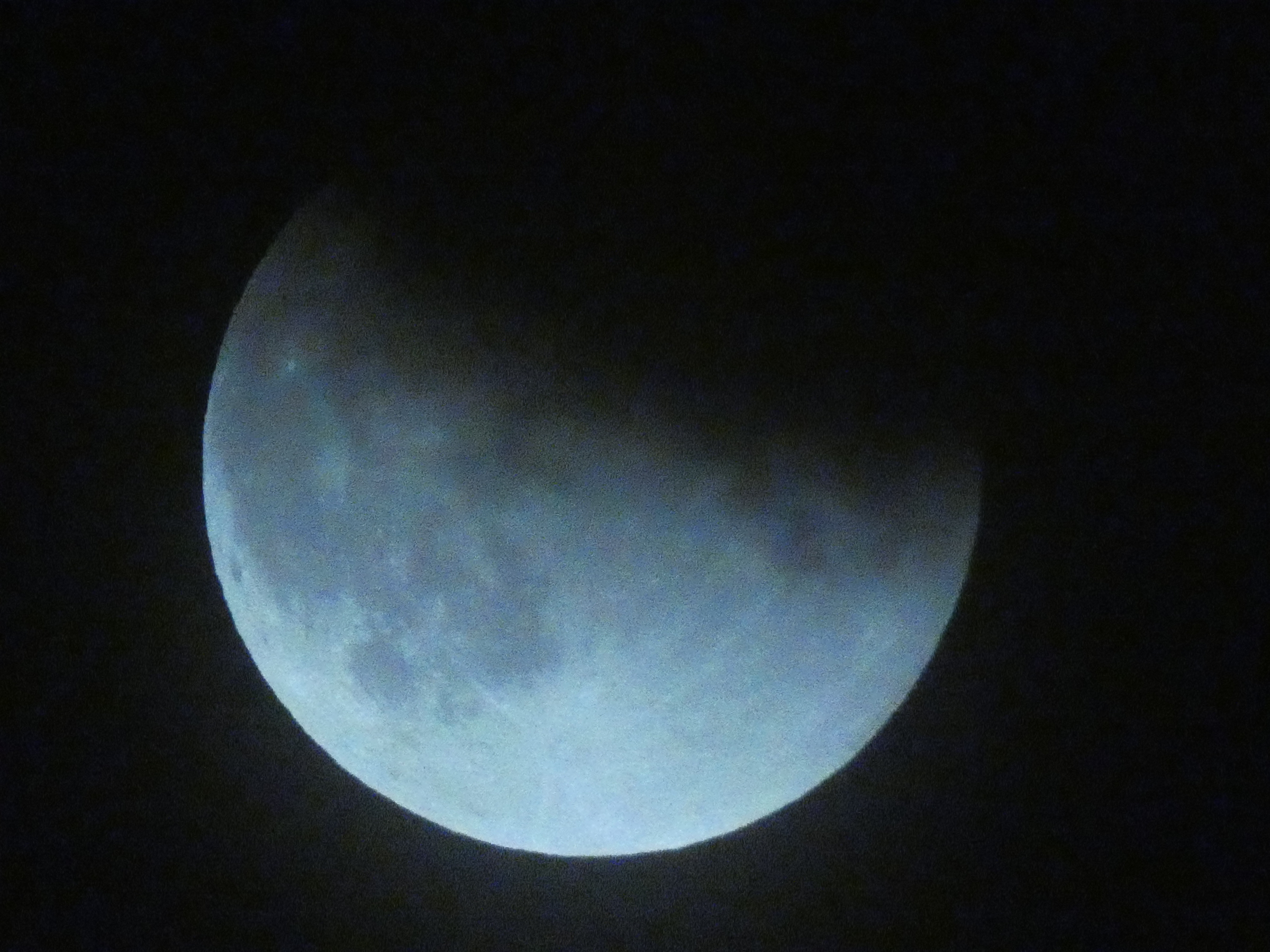
Logroño, Spain, 22:32 UTC

== Eclipse details ==
Shown below is a table displaying details about this particular lunar eclipse. It describes various parameters pertaining to this eclipse.

July 16, 2019 Lunar Eclipse Parameters
Parameter	Value
Penumbral Magnitude	1.70500
Umbral Magnitude	0.65442
Gamma	−0.64300
Sun Right Ascension	07h43m48.8s
Sun Declination	+21°17'38.5"
Sun Semi-Diameter	15'44.2"
Sun Equatorial Horizontal Parallax	08.7"
Moon Right Ascension	19h44m00.3s
Moon Declination	-21°52'53.0"
Moon Semi-Diameter	14'58.7"
Moon Equatorial Horizontal Parallax	0°54'58.2"
ΔT	69.3 s

== Eclipse season ==
This eclipse is part of an eclipse season, a period, roughly every six months, when eclipses occur. Only two (or occasionally three) eclipse seasons occur each year, and each season lasts about 35 days and repeats just short of six months (173 days) later; thus two full eclipse seasons always occur each year. Either two or three eclipses happen each eclipse season. In the sequence below, each eclipse is separated by a fortnight.

Eclipse season of July 2019
July 2 Ascending node (new moon)	July 16 Descending node (full moon)
Total solar eclipse Solar Saros 127	Partial lunar eclipse Lunar Saros 139

== Related eclipses ==
=== Eclipses in 2019 ===
- A partial solar eclipse on January 6.
- A total lunar eclipse on January 21.
- A total solar eclipse on July 2.
- A partial lunar eclipse on July 16.
- An annular solar eclipse on December 26.

=== Metonic ===
- Preceded by: Lunar eclipse of September 28, 2015
- Followed by: Lunar eclipse of May 5, 2023

=== Tzolkinex ===
- Preceded by: Lunar eclipse of June 4, 2012
- Followed by: Lunar eclipse of August 28, 2026

=== Half-Saros ===
- Preceded by: Solar eclipse of July 11, 2010
- Followed by: Solar eclipse of July 22, 2028

=== Tritos ===
- Preceded by: Lunar eclipse of August 16, 2008
- Followed by: Lunar eclipse of June 15, 2030

=== Lunar Saros 139 ===
- Preceded by: Lunar eclipse of July 5, 2001
- Followed by: Lunar eclipse of July 27, 2037

=== Inex ===
- Preceded by: Lunar eclipse of August 6, 1990
- Followed by: Lunar eclipse of June 26, 2048

=== Triad ===
- Preceded by: Lunar eclipse of September 14, 1932
- Followed by: Lunar eclipse of May 17, 2106

=== Lunar eclipses of 2016–2020 ===
This eclipse is a member of a semester series. An eclipse in a semester series of lunar eclipses repeats approximately every 177 days and 4 hours (a semester) at alternating nodes of the Moon's orbit.

The penumbral lunar eclipses on March 23, 2016 and September 16, 2016 occur in the previous lunar year eclipse set, and the penumbral lunar eclipses on June 5, 2020 and November 30, 2020 occur in the next lunar year eclipse set.

Lunar eclipse series sets from 2016 to 2020
Descending node				Ascending node			
Saros	Date Viewing	Type Chart	Gamma	Saros	Date Viewing	Type Chart	Gamma
109	2016 Aug 18	Penumbral	1.5641	114	2017 Feb 11	Penumbral	−1.0255
119	2017 Aug 07	Partial	0.8669	124	2018 Jan 31	Total	−0.3014
129	2018 Jul 27	Total	0.1168	134	2019 Jan 21	Total	0.3684
139	2019 Jul 16	Partial	−0.6430	144	2020 Jan 10	Penumbral	1.0727
149	2020 Jul 05	Penumbral	−1.3639				

=== Saros 139 ===
This eclipse is a part of Saros series 139, repeating every 18 years, 11 days, and containing 79 events. The series started with a penumbral lunar eclipse on December 9, 1658. It contains partial eclipses from June 3, 1947 through August 7, 2055; total eclipses from August 17, 2073 through May 30, 2542; and a second set of partial eclipses from June 9, 2560 through August 25, 2686. The series ends at member 75 as a penumbral eclipse on April 13, 3065.

The longest duration of totality will be produced by member 31 at 102 minutes, 39 seconds on November 2, 2199. All eclipses in this series occur at the Moon’s descending node of orbit.

Greatest	First			
The greatest eclipse of the series will occur on 2199 Nov 02, lasting 102 minutes, 39 seconds.	Penumbral	Partial	Total	Central
The greatest eclipse of the series will occur on 2199 Nov 02, lasting 102 minutes, 39 seconds.	1658 Dec 09	1947 Jun 03	2073 Aug 17	2109 Sep 09
The greatest eclipse of the series will occur on 2199 Nov 02, lasting 102 minutes, 39 seconds.	Last			
The greatest eclipse of the series will occur on 2199 Nov 02, lasting 102 minutes, 39 seconds.	Central	Total	Partial	Penumbral
The greatest eclipse of the series will occur on 2199 Nov 02, lasting 102 minutes, 39 seconds.	2488 Apr 26	2542 May 30	2686 Aug 25	3065 Apr 13

Eclipses are tabulated in three columns; every third eclipse in the same column is one exeligmos apart, so they all cast shadows over approximately the same parts of the Earth.

Series members 9–31 occur between 1801 and 2200:
9	10	11
1803 Mar 08	1821 Mar 18	1839 Mar 30
12	13	14
1857 Apr 09	1875 Apr 20	1893 Apr 30
15	16	17
1911 May 13	1929 May 23	1947 Jun 03
18	19	20
1965 Jun 14	1983 Jun 25	2001 Jul 05
21	22	23
2019 Jul 16	2037 Jul 27	2055 Aug 07
24	25	26
2073 Aug 17	2091 Aug 29	2109 Sep 09
27	28	29
2127 Sep 20	2145 Sep 30	2163 Oct 12
30	31	
2181 Oct 22	2199 Nov 02	

=== Tritos series ===
This eclipse is a part of a tritos cycle, repeating at alternating nodes every 135 synodic months (≈ 3986.63 days, or 11 years minus 1 month). Their appearance and longitude are irregular due to a lack of synchronization with the anomalistic month (period of perigee), but groupings of 3 tritos cycles (≈ 33 years minus 3 months) come close (≈ 434.044 anomalistic months), so eclipses are similar in these groupings.

Series members between 1801 and 2200
1801 Mar 30 (Saros 119)	1812 Feb 27 (Saros 120)	1823 Jan 26 (Saros 121)	1833 Dec 26 (Saros 122)	1844 Nov 24 (Saros 123)
1855 Oct 25 (Saros 124)	1866 Sep 24 (Saros 125)	1877 Aug 23 (Saros 126)	1888 Jul 23 (Saros 127)	1899 Jun 23 (Saros 128)
1910 May 24 (Saros 129)	1921 Apr 22 (Saros 130)	1932 Mar 22 (Saros 131)	1943 Feb 20 (Saros 132)	1954 Jan 19 (Saros 133)
1964 Dec 19 (Saros 134)	1975 Nov 18 (Saros 135)	1986 Oct 17 (Saros 136)	1997 Sep 16 (Saros 137)	2008 Aug 16 (Saros 138)
2019 Jul 16 (Saros 139)	2030 Jun 15 (Saros 140)	2041 May 16 (Saros 141)	2052 Apr 14 (Saros 142)	2063 Mar 14 (Saros 143)
2074 Feb 11 (Saros 144)	2085 Jan 10 (Saros 145)	2095 Dec 11 (Saros 146)	2106 Nov 11 (Saros 147)	2117 Oct 10 (Saros 148)
2128 Sep 09 (Saros 149)	2139 Aug 10 (Saros 150)	2150 Jul 09 (Saros 151)	2161 Jun 08 (Saros 152)	2172 May 08 (Saros 153)
	2194 Mar 07 (Saros 155)			

=== Inex series ===
This eclipse is a part of the long period inex cycle, repeating at alternating nodes, every 358 synodic months (≈ 10,571.95 days, or 29 years minus 20 days). Their appearance and longitude are irregular due to a lack of synchronization with the anomalistic month (period of perigee). However, groupings of 3 inex cycles (≈ 87 years minus 2 months) comes close (≈ 1,151.02 anomalistic months), so eclipses are similar in these groupings.

Series members between 1801 and 2200
1816 Dec 04 (Saros 132)	1845 Nov 14 (Saros 133)	1874 Oct 25 (Saros 134)
1903 Oct 06 (Saros 135)	1932 Sep 14 (Saros 136)	1961 Aug 26 (Saros 137)
1990 Aug 06 (Saros 138)	2019 Jul 16 (Saros 139)	2048 Jun 26 (Saros 140)
2077 Jun 06 (Saros 141)	2106 May 17 (Saros 142)	2135 Apr 28 (Saros 143)
2164 Apr 07 (Saros 144)	2193 Mar 17 (Saros 145)	

=== Half-Saros cycle ===
A lunar eclipse will be preceded and followed by solar eclipses by 9 years and 5.5 days (a half saros). This lunar eclipse is related to two total solar eclipses of Solar Saros 146.

July 11, 2010	July 22, 2028

== See also ==
- List of lunar eclipses and List of 21st-century lunar eclipses
