= Solar eclipse of April 19, 2004 =

21st-century partial solar eclipse

- Partial eclipse
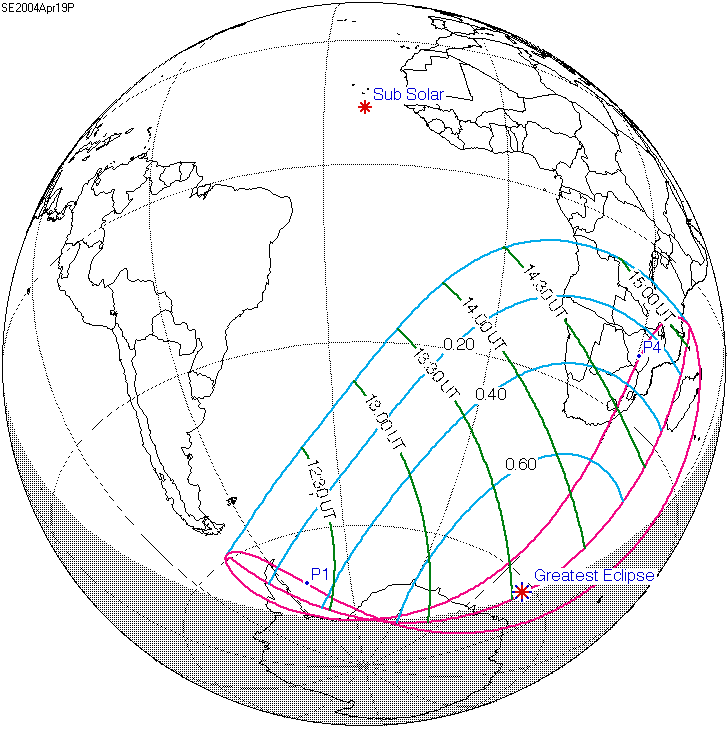
- Map
- Gamma: −1.1335
- Magnitude: 0.7367

Maximum eclipse
- Coordinates: 61.6°S 44.3°E

Times (UTC)
- Greatest eclipse: 13:35:05

References
- Saros: 119 (65 of 71)
- Catalog # (SE5000): 9517

A partial solar eclipse occurred at the Moon's ascending node of orbit on Monday, April 19, 2004, with a magnitude of 0.7367. A solar eclipse occurs when the Moon passes between Earth and the Sun, thereby totally or partly obscuring the image of the Sun for a viewer on Earth. A partial solar eclipse occurs in the polar regions of the Earth when the center of the Moon's shadow misses the Earth.

The eclipse was largely visible over the south Atlantic Ocean and north shores of Antarctica, most prominently the Antarctic Peninsula. The eclipse could also be seen in southern Africa at sunset. Considering the magnitude and the solar altitude, South Africa was the best place to observe this eclipse. In Cape Town, the Sun was about 40% obscured, while in Pretoria the Sun was 29% obscured. Further north, the eclipse remained visible up to Angola, the southern Democratic Republic of the Congo and Tanzania.

== Images ==
Animated eclipse path

== Eclipse timing ==
=== Places experiencing partial eclipse ===
Solar Eclipse of April 19, 2004 (Local Times)
Country or territory	City or place	Start of partial eclipse	Maximum eclipse	End of partial eclipse	Duration of eclipse (hr:min)	Maximum coverage
Antarctica	Orcadas Base	08:34:21	09:21:09	10:09:32	1:35	10.74%
South Georgia and the South Sandwich Islands	King Edward Point	09:42:42	10:28:02	11:14:51	1:32	7.80%
Antarctica	Troll	11:44:14	12:54:08	14:03:30	2:19	50.79%
Bouvet Island	Bouvet Island	13:55:49	15:14:25	16:30:52	2:35	46.75%
Saint Helena, Ascension and Tristan da Cunha	Edinburgh of the Seven Seas	12:18:49	13:20:06	14:21:02	2:02	12.16%
French Southern and Antarctic Lands	Île de la Possession	17:59:01	18:43:40	18:48:03 (sunset)	0:49	40.02%
South Africa	Marion Island	15:45:54	17:01:10	17:42:47 (sunset)	1:57	58.91%
South Africa	Cape Town	14:51:36	16:10:46	17:22:13	2:31	39.54%
South Africa	Gqeberha	15:01:15	16:17:59	17:26:41	2:25	42.19%
Lesotho	Mafeteng	15:14:30	16:27:18	17:32:18	2:18	36.01%
Lesotho	Maseru	15:16:14	16:28:26	17:32:53	2:17	35.19%
Lesotho	Teyateyaneng	15:17:01	16:28:57	17:33:08	2:16	34.94%
South Africa	Durban	15:19:10	16:29:59	17:32:12 (sunset)	2:13	36.23%
Namibia	Windhoek	14:23:38	15:31:17	16:32:18	2:09	21.38%
Madagascar	Antananarivo	17:08:20	17:34:18	17:36:37 (sunset)	0:28	8.56%
South Africa	Johannesburg	15:25:54	16:34:29	17:35:46	2:10	29.88%
South Africa	Pretoria	15:27:27	16:35:24	17:36:07	2:09	29.07%
Botswana	Gaborone	15:27:54	16:35:37	17:36:12	2:08	27.02%
Eswatini	Mbabane	15:29:22	16:36:20	17:35:14 (sunset)	2:06	30.04%
Mozambique	Maputo	15:32:06	16:37:46	17:29:54 (sunset)	1:58	29.26%
Angola	Menongue	14:55:09	15:45:31	16:31:47	1:37	8.73%
Madagascar	Toliara	16:51:08	17:45:37	17:48:01 (sunset)	0:57	21.42%
Mayotte	Mamoudzou	17:30:57	17:48:23	17:51:04 (sunset)	0:20	2.33%
Zimbabwe	Harare	15:56:36	16:49:50	17:38:13	1:42	14.55%
Angola	Luanda	15:27:38	15:50:30	16:12:31	0:45	0.75%
Zambia	Lusaka	16:02:45	16:51:54	17:36:54	1:34	10.65%
Comoros	Moroni	17:34:35	17:54:43	17:59:50 (sunset)	0:25	2.03%
Malawi	Lilongwe	16:14:17	16:56:11	17:34:58	1:22	7.58%
Democratic Republic of the Congo	Lubumbashi	16:18:33	16:56:38	17:32:08	1:14	4.87%

== Eclipse details ==
Shown below are two tables displaying details about this particular solar eclipse. The first table outlines times at which the Moon's penumbra or umbra attains the specific parameter, and the second table describes various other parameters pertaining to this eclipse.

April 19, 2004 Solar Eclipse Times
Event	Time (UTC)
First Penumbral External Contact	2004 April 19 at 11:30:59.6 UTC
Equatorial Conjunction	2004 April 19 at 12:30:29.4 UTC
Ecliptic Conjunction	2004 April 19 at 13:22:15.9 UTC
Greatest Eclipse	2004 April 19 at 13:35:05.3 UTC
Last Penumbral External Contact	2004 April 19 at 15:39:41.1 UTC

April 19, 2004 Solar Eclipse Parameters
Parameter	Value
Eclipse Magnitude	0.73674
Eclipse Obscuration	0.65501
Gamma	−1.13345
Sun Right Ascension	01h50m58.6s
Sun Declination	+11°24'41.2"
Sun Semi-Diameter	15'55.2"
Sun Equatorial Horizontal Parallax	08.8"
Moon Right Ascension	01h52m50.5s
Moon Declination	+10°28'42.9"
Moon Semi-Diameter	15'01.7"
Moon Equatorial Horizontal Parallax	0°55'09.3"
ΔT	64.6 s

== Eclipse season ==
This eclipse is part of an eclipse season, a period, roughly every six months, when eclipses occur. Only two (or occasionally three) eclipse seasons occur each year, and each season lasts about 35 days and repeats just short of six months (173 days) later; thus two full eclipse seasons always occur each year. Either two or three eclipses happen each eclipse season. In the sequence below, each eclipse is separated by a fortnight.

Eclipse season of April–May 2004
April 19 Ascending node (new moon)	May 4 Descending node (full moon)
Partial solar eclipse Solar Saros 119	Total lunar eclipse Lunar Saros 131

== Related eclipses ==
=== Eclipses in 2004 ===
- A partial solar eclipse on April 19.
- A total lunar eclipse on May 4.
- A partial solar eclipse on October 14.
- A total lunar eclipse on October 28.

=== Metonic ===
- Preceded by: Solar eclipse of July 1, 2000
- Followed by: Solar eclipse of February 7, 2008

=== Tzolkinex ===
- Preceded by: Solar eclipse of March 9, 1997
- Followed by: Solar eclipse of June 1, 2011

=== Half-Saros ===
- Preceded by: Lunar eclipse of April 15, 1995
- Followed by: Lunar eclipse of April 25, 2013

=== Tritos ===
- Preceded by: Solar eclipse of May 21, 1993
- Followed by: Solar eclipse of March 20, 2015

=== Solar Saros 119 ===
- Preceded by: Solar eclipse of April 9, 1986
- Followed by: Solar eclipse of April 30, 2022

=== Inex ===
- Preceded by: Solar eclipse of May 11, 1975
- Followed by: Solar eclipse of March 30, 2033

=== Triad ===
- Preceded by: Solar eclipse of June 19, 1917
- Followed by: Solar eclipse of February 18, 2091

=== Solar eclipses of 2004–2007 ===
This eclipse is a member of a semester series. An eclipse in a semester series of solar eclipses repeats approximately every 177 days and 4 hours (a semester) at alternating nodes of the Moon's orbit.

Solar eclipse series sets from 2004 to 2007
Ascending node			Descending node		
Saros	Map	Gamma	Saros	Map	Gamma
119	April 19, 2004 Partial	−1.13345	124	October 14, 2004 Partial	1.03481
129 Partial in Naiguatá, Venezuela	April 8, 2005 Hybrid	−0.34733	134 Annularity in Madrid, Spain	October 3, 2005 Annular	0.33058
139 Totality in Side, Turkey	March 29, 2006 Total	0.38433	144 Partial in São Paulo, Brazil	September 22, 2006 Annular	−0.40624
149 Partial in Jaipur, India	March 19, 2007 Partial	1.07277	154 Partial in Córdoba, Argentina	September 11, 2007 Partial	−1.12552

=== Saros 119 ===
This eclipse is a part of Saros series 119, repeating every 18 years, 11 days, and containing 71 events. The series started with a partial solar eclipse on May 15, 850 AD. It contains total eclipses on August 9, 994 AD and August 20, 1012; a hybrid eclipse on August 31, 1030; and annular eclipses from September 10, 1048 through March 18, 1950. The series ends at member 71 as a partial eclipse on June 24, 2112. Its eclipses are tabulated in three columns; every third eclipse in the same column is one exeligmos apart, so they all cast shadows over approximately the same parts of the Earth.

The longest duration of totality was produced by member 10 at 32 seconds on August 20, 1012, and the longest duration of annularity was produced by member 44 at 7 minutes, 37 seconds on September 1, 1625. All eclipses in this series occur at the Moon’s ascending node of orbit.

Series members 54–71 occur between 1801 and 2112:
54	55	56
December 21, 1805	January 1, 1824	January 11, 1842
57	58	59
January 23, 1860	February 2, 1878	February 13, 1896
60	61	62
February 25, 1914	March 7, 1932	March 18, 1950
63	64	65
March 28, 1968	April 9, 1986	April 19, 2004
66	67	68
April 30, 2022	May 11, 2040	May 22, 2058
69	70	71
June 1, 2076	June 13, 2094	June 24, 2112

=== Metonic series ===
The metonic series repeats eclipses every 19 years (6939.69 days), lasting about 5 cycles. Eclipses occur in nearly the same calendar date. In addition, the octon subseries repeats 1/5 of that or every 3.8 years (1387.94 days). All eclipses in this table occur at the Moon's ascending node.

21 eclipse events between July 1, 2000 and July 1, 2076
July 1–2	April 19–20	February 5–7	November 24–25	September 12–13
117	119	121	123	125
July 1, 2000	April 19, 2004	February 7, 2008	November 25, 2011	September 13, 2015
127	129	131	133	135
July 2, 2019	April 20, 2023	February 6, 2027	November 25, 2030	September 12, 2034
137	139	141	143	145
July 2, 2038	April 20, 2042	February 5, 2046	November 25, 2049	September 12, 2053
147	149	151	153	155
July 1, 2057	April 20, 2061	February 5, 2065	November 24, 2068	September 12, 2072
157
July 1, 2076

=== Tritos series ===
This eclipse is a part of a tritos cycle, repeating at alternating nodes every 135 synodic months (≈ 3986.63 days, or 11 years minus 1 month). Their appearance and longitude are irregular due to a lack of synchronization with the anomalistic month (period of perigee), but groupings of 3 tritos cycles (≈ 33 years minus 3 months) come close (≈ 434.044 anomalistic months), so eclipses are similar in these groupings.

The partial solar eclipses on March 27, 1884 (part of Saros 108) and December 24, 1916 (part of Saros 111) are also a part of this series but are not included in the table below.

Series members between 1971 and 2200
July 22, 1971 (Saros 116)	June 21, 1982 (Saros 117)	May 21, 1993 (Saros 118)	April 19, 2004 (Saros 119)	March 20, 2015 (Saros 120)
February 17, 2026 (Saros 121)	January 16, 2037 (Saros 122)	December 16, 2047 (Saros 123)	November 16, 2058 (Saros 124)	October 15, 2069 (Saros 125)
September 13, 2080 (Saros 126)	August 15, 2091 (Saros 127)	July 15, 2102 (Saros 128)	June 13, 2113 (Saros 129)	May 14, 2124 (Saros 130)
April 13, 2135 (Saros 131)	March 12, 2146 (Saros 132)	February 9, 2157 (Saros 133)	January 10, 2168 (Saros 134)	December 9, 2178 (Saros 135)
November 8, 2189 (Saros 136)	October 9, 2200 (Saros 137)			

=== Inex series ===
This eclipse is a part of the long period inex cycle, repeating at alternating nodes, every 358 synodic months (≈ 10,571.95 days, or 29 years minus 20 days). Their appearance and longitude are irregular due to a lack of synchronization with the anomalistic month (period of perigee). However, groupings of 3 inex cycles (≈ 87 years minus 2 months) comes close (≈ 1,151.02 anomalistic months), so eclipses are similar in these groupings.

Series members between 1801 and 2200
September 8, 1801 (Saros 112)	August 18, 1830 (Saros 113)	July 29, 1859 (Saros 114)
July 9, 1888 (Saros 115)	June 19, 1917 (Saros 116)	May 30, 1946 (Saros 117)
May 11, 1975 (Saros 118)	April 19, 2004 (Saros 119)	March 30, 2033 (Saros 120)
March 11, 2062 (Saros 121)	February 18, 2091 (Saros 122)	January 30, 2120 (Saros 123)
January 9, 2149 (Saros 124)	December 20, 2177 (Saros 125)	
