= Solar eclipse of March 20, 2015 =

Total eclipse

- Total eclipse
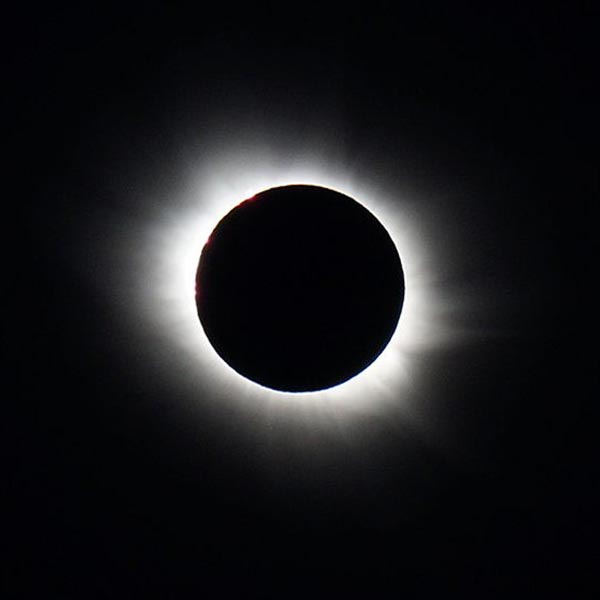
- From Longyearbyen, Svalbard

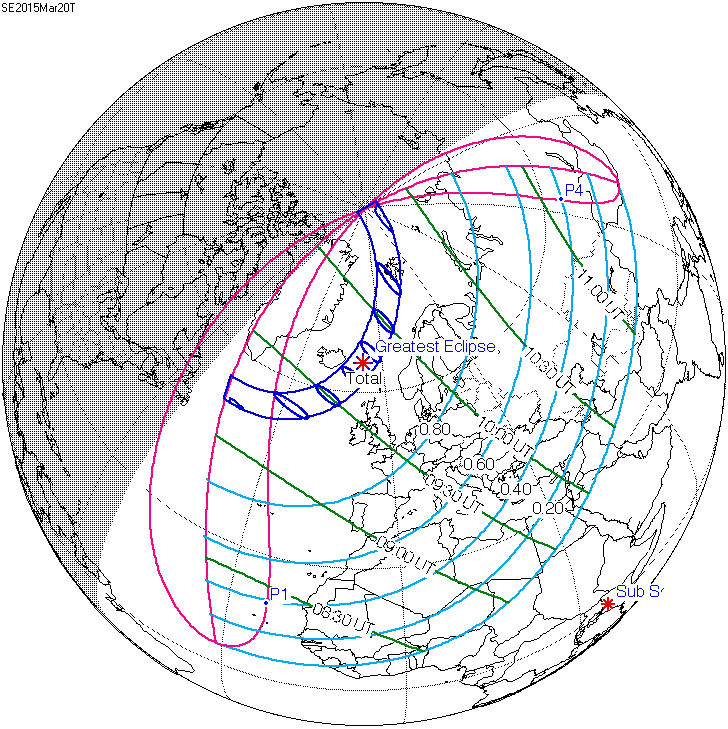
- Map
- Gamma: 0.9454
- Magnitude: 1.0445

Maximum eclipse
- Duration: 167 s (2 min 47 s)
- Coordinates: 64.4°N 6.6°W
- Max. width of band: 463 km (288 mi)

Times (UTC)
- Greatest eclipse: 9:46:47

References
- Saros: 120 (61 of 71)
- Catalog # (SE5000): 9541

A total solar eclipse occurred at the Moon's descending node of orbit on Friday, March 20, 2015, with a magnitude of 1.0445. A solar eclipse occurs when the Moon passes between Earth and the Sun, thereby totally or partly obscuring the image of the Sun for a viewer on Earth. A total solar eclipse occurs when the Moon's apparent diameter is larger than the Sun's, blocking all direct sunlight, turning day into darkness. Totality occurs in a narrow path across Earth's surface, with a partial solar eclipse visible over a surrounding region thousands of kilometres wide. Occurring about 14 hours after perigee (on March 19, 2015, at 19:40 UTC), the Moon's apparent diameter was larger.

Totality was visible in the Faroe Islands and Svalbard. A partial eclipse was visible for parts of Greenland, Europe, North Africa, Central Asia, and western Russia. This total solar eclipse is notable in that the path of totality passed over the North Pole.

The longest duration of totality was 2 minutes and 47 seconds off the coast of the Faroe Islands. It was the last total solar eclipse visible in Europe until the eclipse of August 12, 2026.

== Event ==
=== Simulation ===
Animation of the eclipse shadow.

Another animation of the eclipse shadow.

The solar eclipse began at 08:30 GMT in northwest Europe, and moved towards the northeast, but was still in northern Europe. It was most visible from the North Atlantic and Arctic Oceans, Greenland, Iceland, Ireland, the United Kingdom, Faroe Islands, northern Norway and Murmansk Oblast. The shadow began its pass off the south coast of Greenland. It then moved to the northeast, passing between Iceland and the United Kingdom before moving over the Faroe Islands and the northernmost islands of Norway. The shadow of the eclipse was visible in varying degrees all over Europe. For example, London experienced an 86.8% partial solar eclipse while points north of the Faroe Islands in the Norwegian Sea saw a complete solar eclipse. Three chartered airliners flew above the clouds, giving passengers a slightly prolonged view.

The eclipse was observed at radio frequencies at the Metsähovi Radio Observatory, Finland, where a partial eclipse was seen. The eclipse was also observed by meteorological satellite Meteosat-10.

=== Impact ===
The European Union had a solar power output of about 90 gigawatts and production could have been temporarily decreased by up to 34 GW of that dependent on the clarity of the sky. In actuality the dip was less than expected, with a 13 GW drop in Germany happening due to overcast skies. This was the first time that an eclipse had a significant impact on the power system, and the electricity sector took measures to mitigate the impact. The power gradient (change in power) could have been −400 MW/minute and +700 MW/minute for places in the Netherlands, Belgium and Denmark which were up to 85% obscured. The temperature drops varied greatly across Europe, with most areas having an insignificant drop in temperature due to the overcast weather, while others, like Scotland, Wales, and Iceland received a drop of 2–4°C. These areas were not obscured by cloud cover during the eclipse which may have led to the drop in temperature. Wind speed in the UK dropped by ~9%.

=== Coincidence of events ===
In addition to the eclipse, 20 March 2015 was also the day of the March equinox (also known as the spring or vernal equinox in the Northern Hemisphere). In addition, six supermoons were expected for 2015. The supermoon on 20 March 2015 was the third of the year; however, it was a new moon (near side facing away from the Sun), and only its shadow was visible.

At greatest eclipse, the Sun was at its zenith less than 24 kilometres (15 mi) south of the Equator. Greatest eclipse occurred at 09:45:39 UTC of Friday, March 20, 2015, while March Equinox occurred at 22:45:09 UTC, just under 13 hours after the greatest eclipse (Greatest eclipse occurred in winter, 13 hours before spring).

== Eclipse timing ==
=== Places experiencing total eclipse ===
Solar Eclipse of March 20, 2015 (Local Times)
Country or territory	City or place	Start of partial eclipse	Start of total eclipse	Maximum eclipse	End of total eclipse	End of partial eclipse	Duration of totality (min:s)	Duration of eclipse (hr:min)	Maximum magnitude
Faroe Islands	Tórshavn	08:39:02	09:41:06	09:42:06	09:43:05	10:47:53	1:59	2:09	1.0068
Faroe Islands	Klaksvík	08:39:30	09:41:30	09:42:33	09:43:36	10:48:17	2:06	2:09	1.0076
Svalbard and Jan Mayen	Ny-Ålesund	10:11:37	11:10:04	11:11:15	11:12:25	12:11:16	2:21	2:00	1.0148
Svalbard and Jan Mayen	Barentsburg	10:11:26	11:10:16	11:11:31	11:12:46	12:11:58	2:30	2:01	1.0205
Svalbard and Jan Mayen	Longyearbyen	10:12:04	11:10:54	11:12:08	11:13:22	12:12:32	2:28	2:00	1.0179

=== Places experiencing partial eclipse ===
Solar Eclipse of March 20, 2015 (Local Times)
Country or territory	City or place	Start of partial eclipse	Maximum eclipse	End of partial eclipse	Duration of eclipse (hr:min)	Maximum coverage
Portugal	Lisbon	07:59:23	09:01:03	10:08:23	2:09	66.92%
Spain	Madrid	09:05:08	10:09:00	11:18:20	2:13	66.53%
Guernsey	Saint Anne	08:20:35	09:26:12	10:36:10	2:16	83.09%
Ireland	Dublin	08:24:09	09:28:33	10:36:55	2:13	91.56%
France	Paris	09:22:43	10:29:31	11:40:28	2:18	77.89%
United Kingdom	London	08:25:01	09:31:09	10:41:13	2:16	84.44%
Isle of Man	Douglas	08:26:35	09:31:23	10:39:58	2:13	91.53%
Italy	Rome	09:23:58	10:31:30	11:42:51	2:19	53.75%
Switzerland	Zurich	09:26:24	10:34:27	11:46:15	2:20	69.33%
Belgium	Brussels	09:27:34	10:34:47	11:45:43	2:18	79.65%
Luxembourg	Luxembourg	09:27:16	10:34:55	11:46:16	2:19	75.87%
Greenland	Nuuk	06:28:42 (sunrise)	06:36:06	07:27:35	0:59	88.46%
Iceland	Reykjavík	08:37:49	09:37:20	10:39:35	2:02	97.77%
Netherlands	Amsterdam	09:30:26	10:37:39	11:48:20	2:18	81.77%
Czech Republic	Prague	09:36:50	10:45:45	11:57:19	2:20	68.67%
Austria	Vienna	09:36:54	10:45:56	11:57:31	2:21	62.83%
Germany	Berlin	09:38:54	10:47:32	11:58:41	2:20	74.32%
Hungary	Budapest	09:39:46	10:48:48	12:00:01	2:20	58.36%
Denmark	Copenhagen	09:42:27	10:50:30	12:00:46	2:18	80.60%
Norway	Oslo	09:46:48	10:53:33	12:02:14	2:15	88.59%
Poland	Warsaw	09:47:40	10:56:49	12:07:26	2:20	66.16%
Greenland	Danmarkshavn	09:01:02	09:59:10	10:58:29	1:57	95.68%
Sweden	Stockholm	09:52:34	11:00:15	12:09:12	2:17	81.97%
Latvia	Riga	10:56:22	12:04:52	13:14:04	2:18	72.49%
Estonia	Tallinn	10:59:29	12:07:22	13:15:46	2:16	76.60%
Finland	Helsinki	11:00:22	12:08:03	13:16:12	2:16	77.76%
Finland	Rovaniemi	11:06:44	12:12:12	13:17:53	2:11	87.56%
Canada	Alert	05:57:40 (sunrise)	06:13:58	06:59:40	1:02	79.28%
Russia	Moscow	12:13:10	13:20:19	14:26:32	2:13	57.50%
Russia	Belushya Guba	12:27:46	13:29:58	14:31:04	2:03	81.88%

== Eclipse visibility ==
The event was visible as a partial eclipse all across Europe including: Norway, Sweden, Denmark, the United Kingdom, Ireland, Portugal, France, Germany, Poland, Czech Republic, Slovakia, Hungary, Austria, Italy, Montenegro, Finland, Western Russia, and Ukraine.

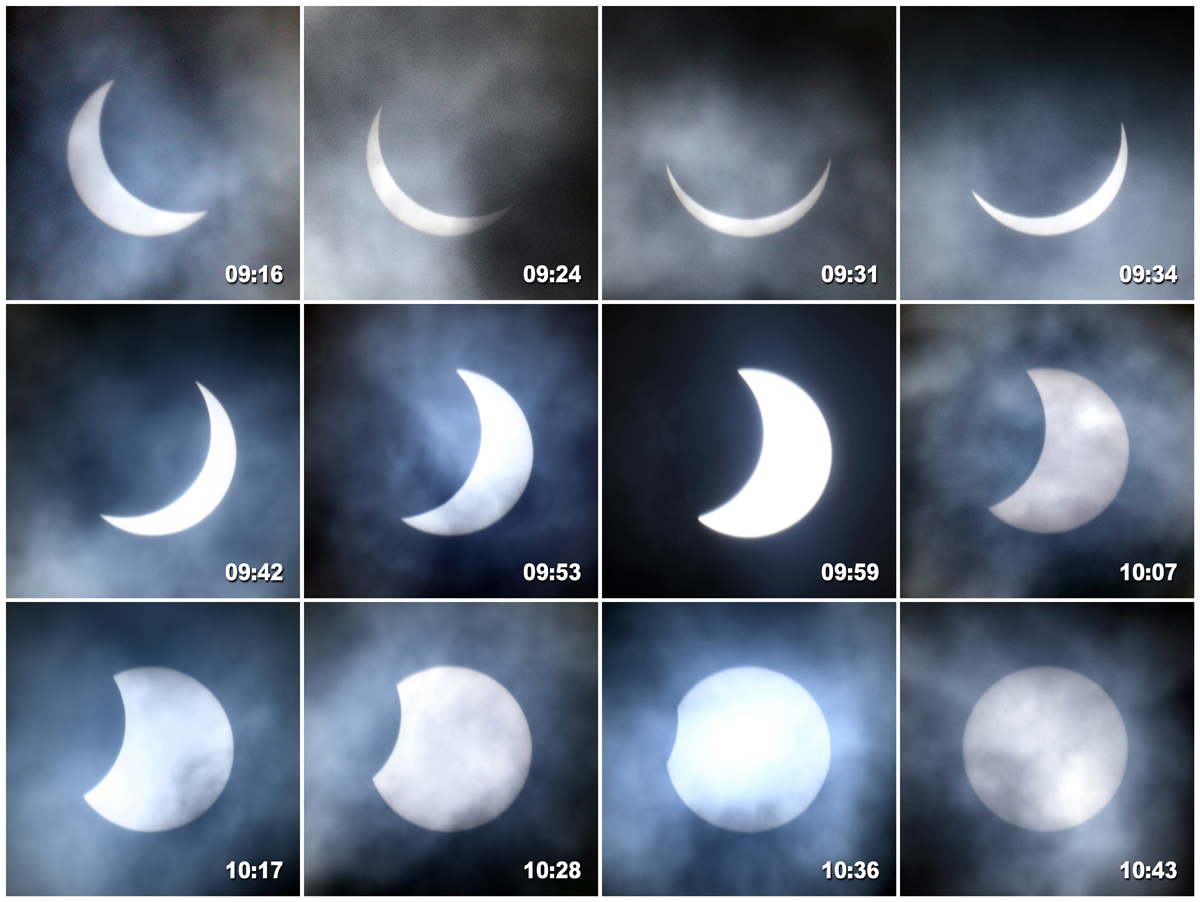
Sheffield, United Kingdom. All time local time (GMT)

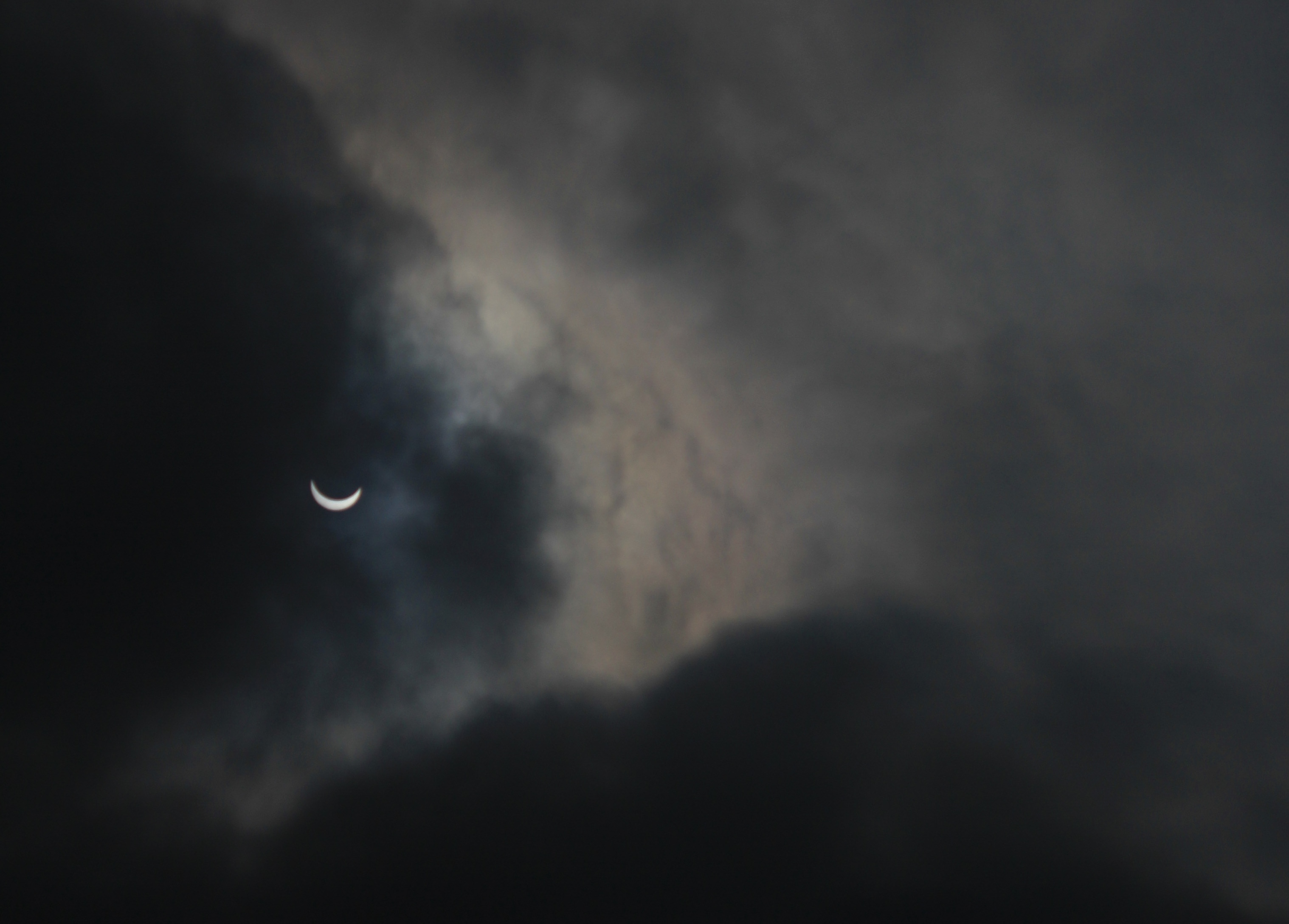
Lorient, France, 10:20 local time (9:20 GMT)

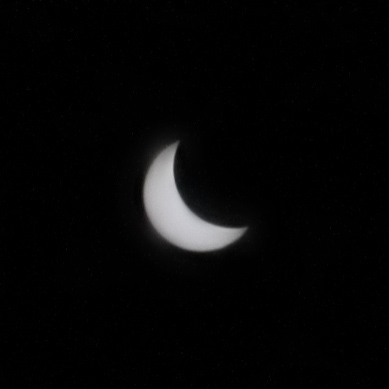
Berlin, Germany, 10:29 local time (9:29 UTC) – unconfirmed source

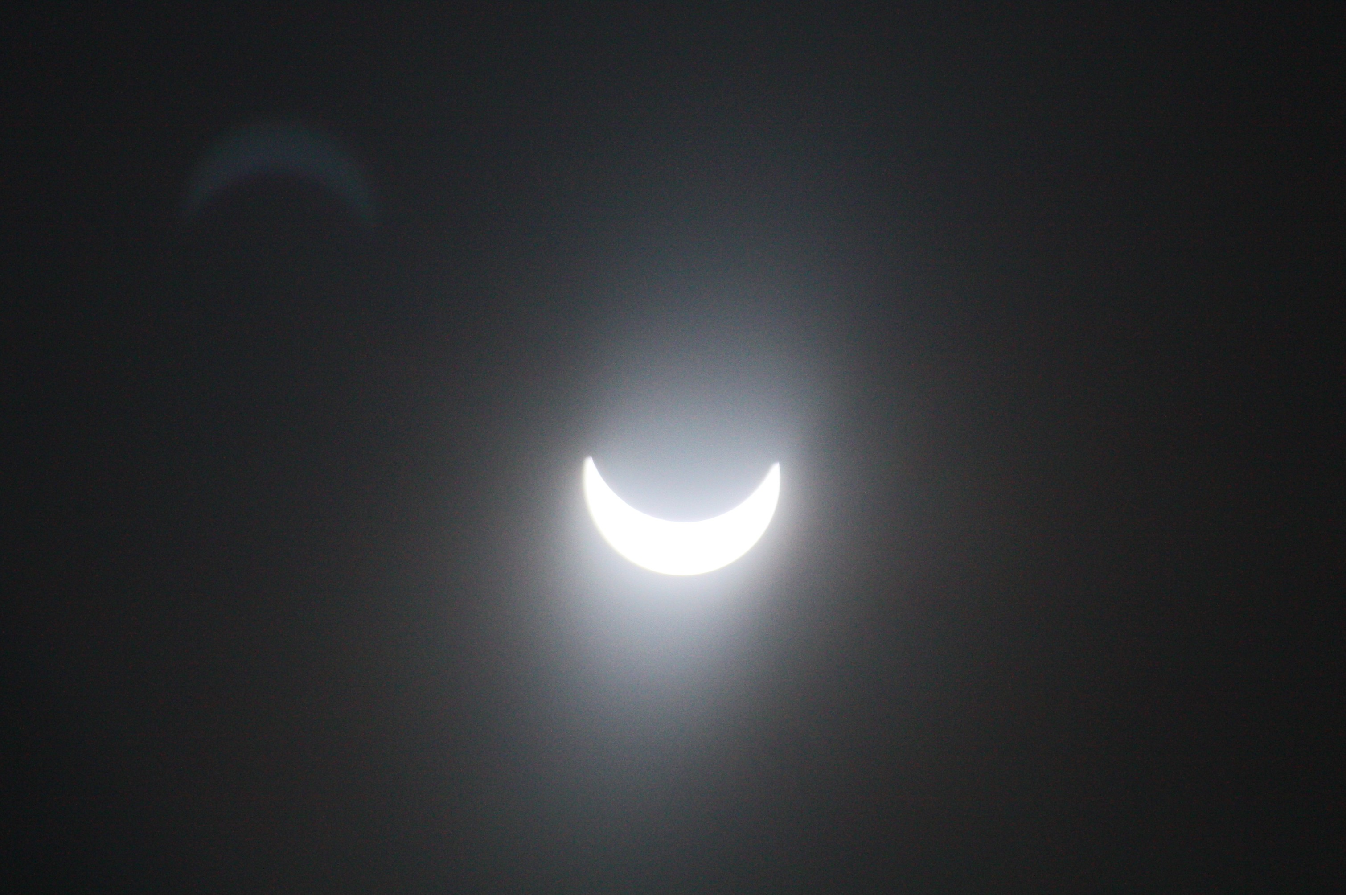
Markt Schwaben, Germany

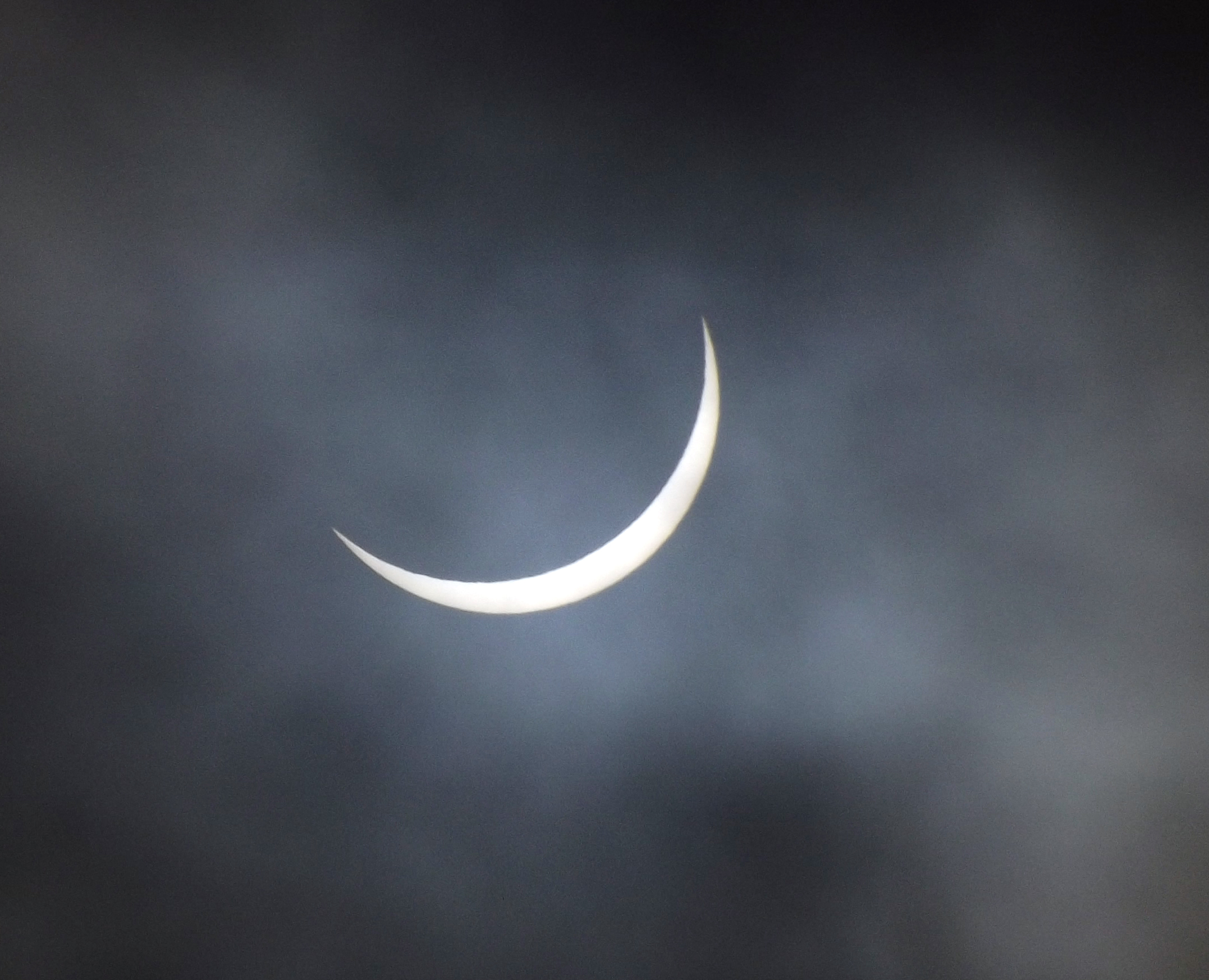
Dublin, Ireland, 9:30 GMT

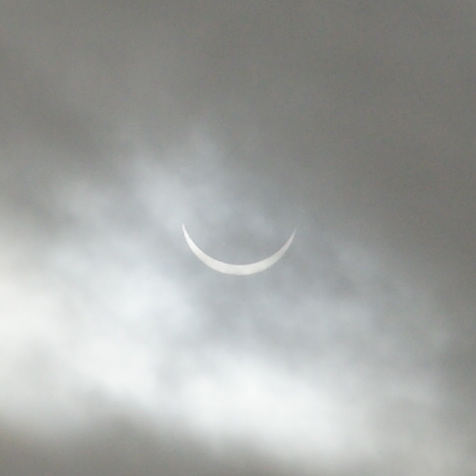
Chester-le-Street, United Kingdom, 9:36 GMT

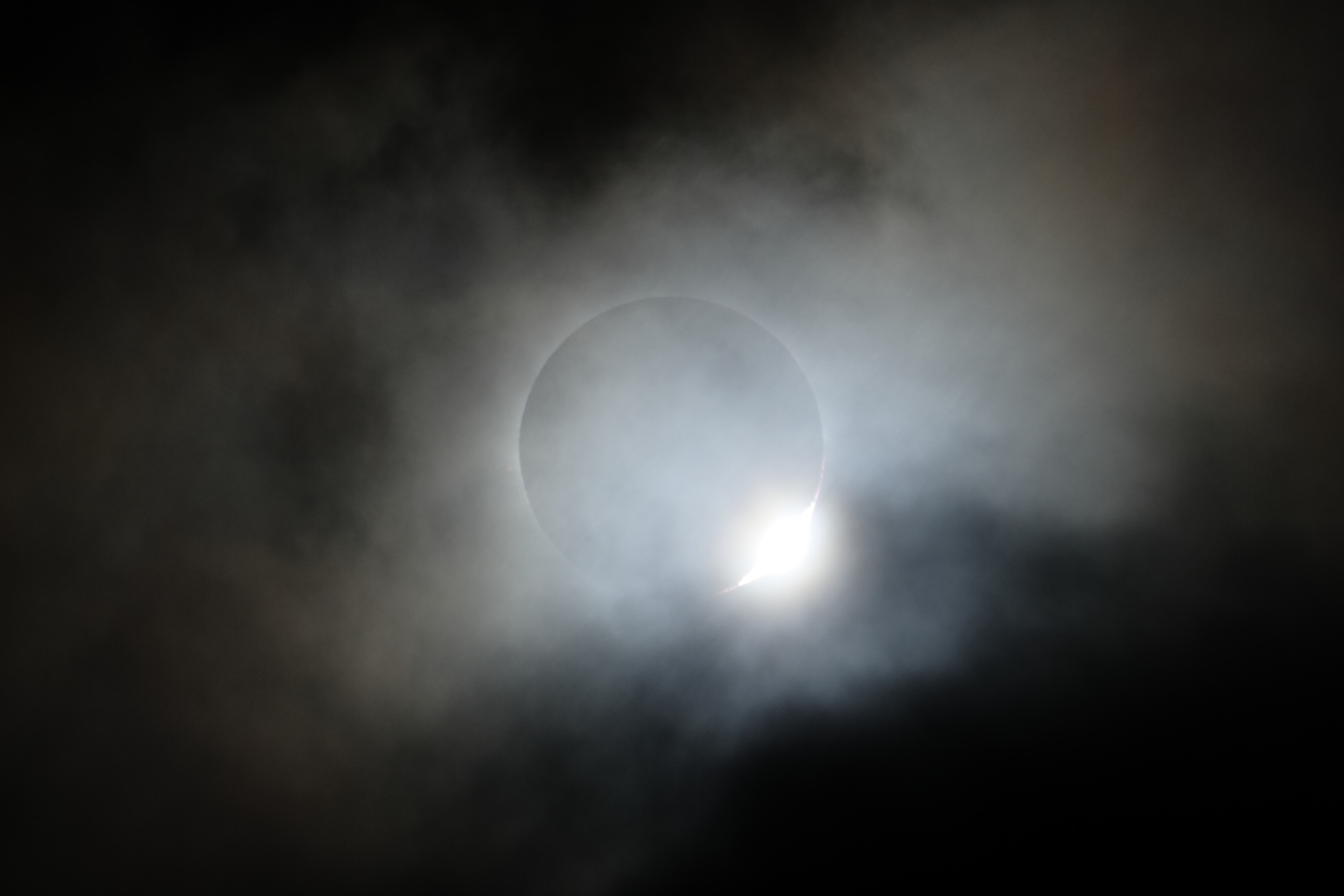
Tórshavn, Faroe Islands, End of totality, 9:43 local time (GMT)

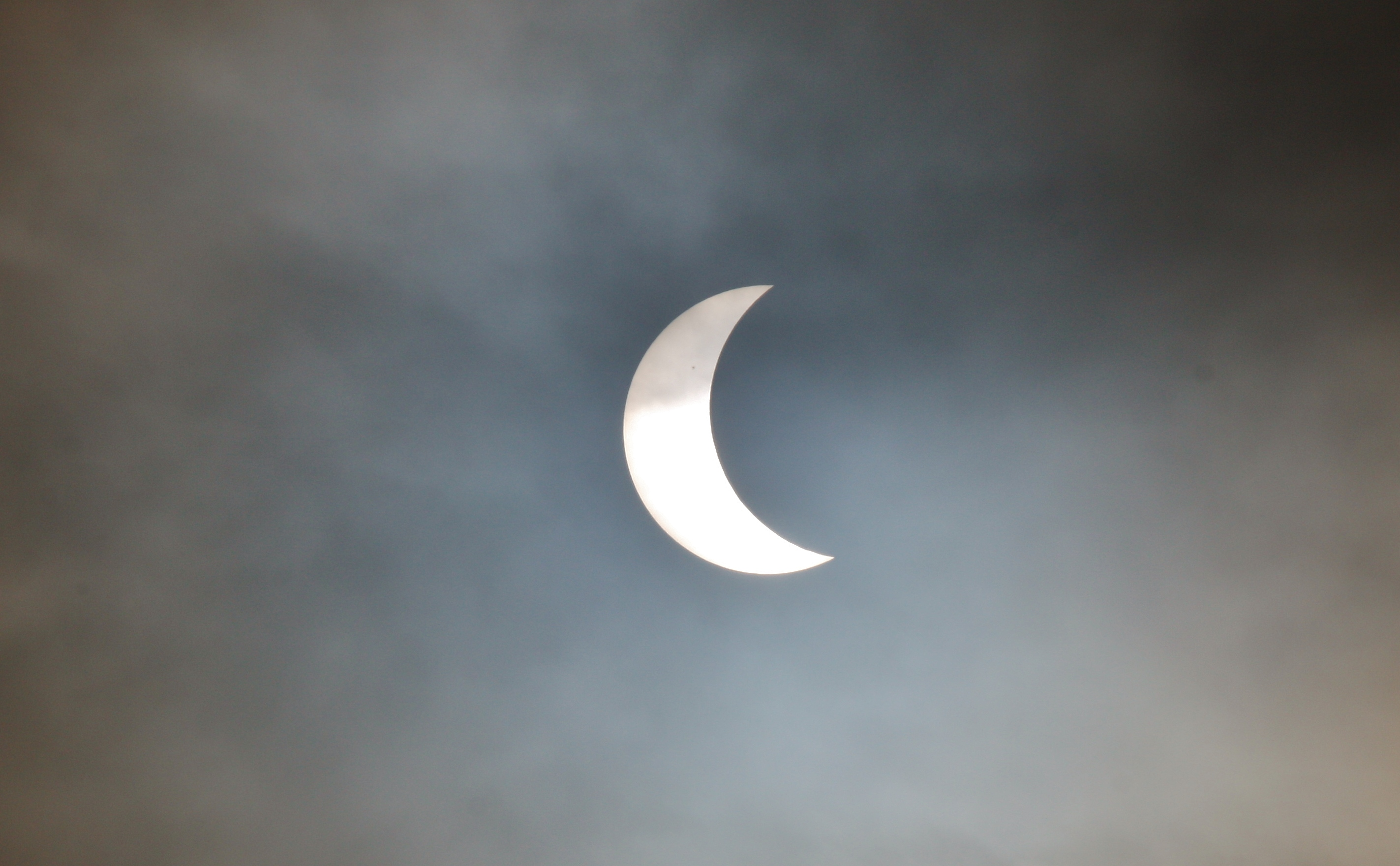
Sumburgh, Scotland, 9:29 local time (GMT)

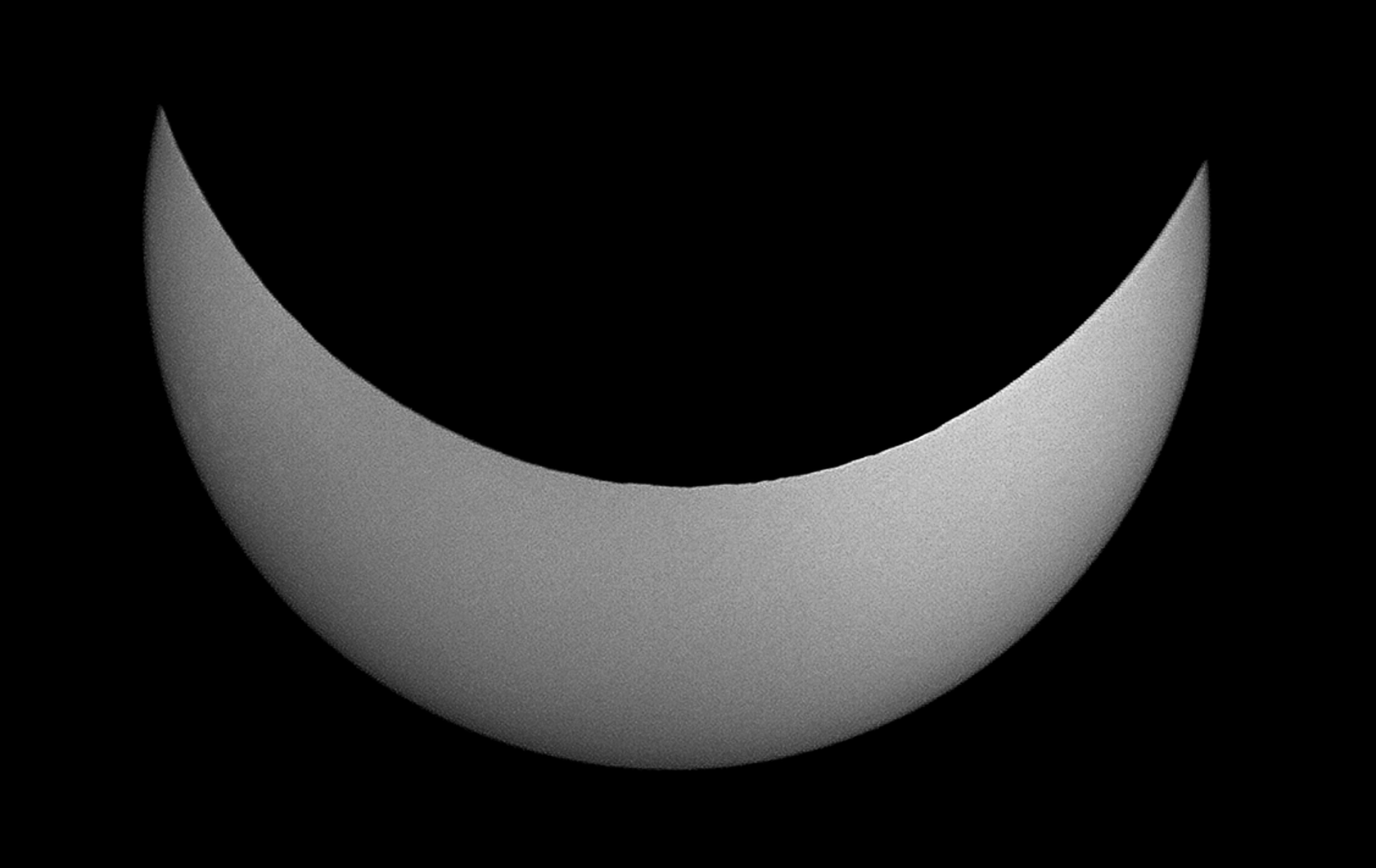
Wrocław, Poland, 10:44 local time (9:44 UTC)

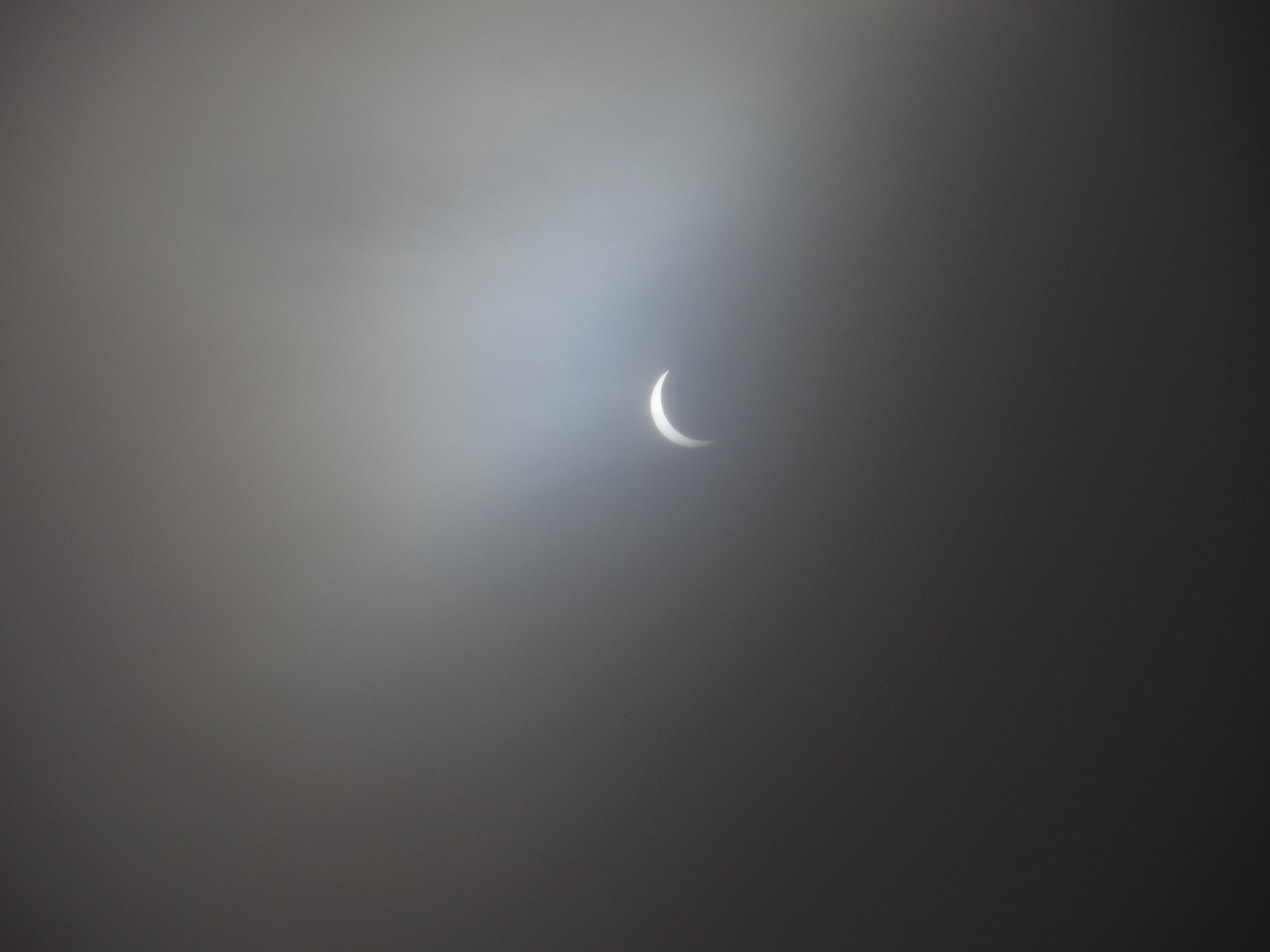
Hjartdal, Norway, 10:47 local time (9:47 UTC)

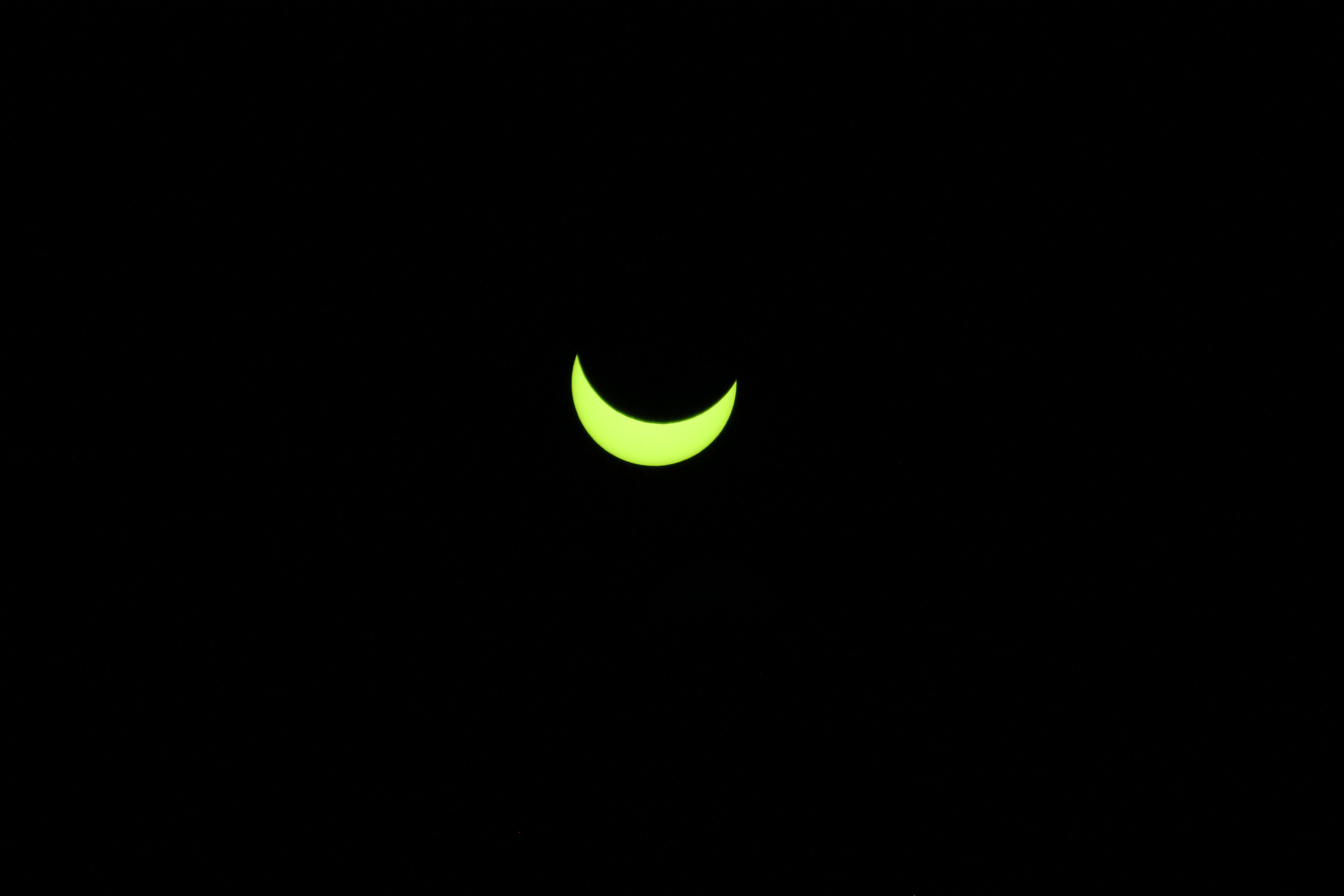
Prague, Czech Republic, 10:49 local time (9:49 UTC)

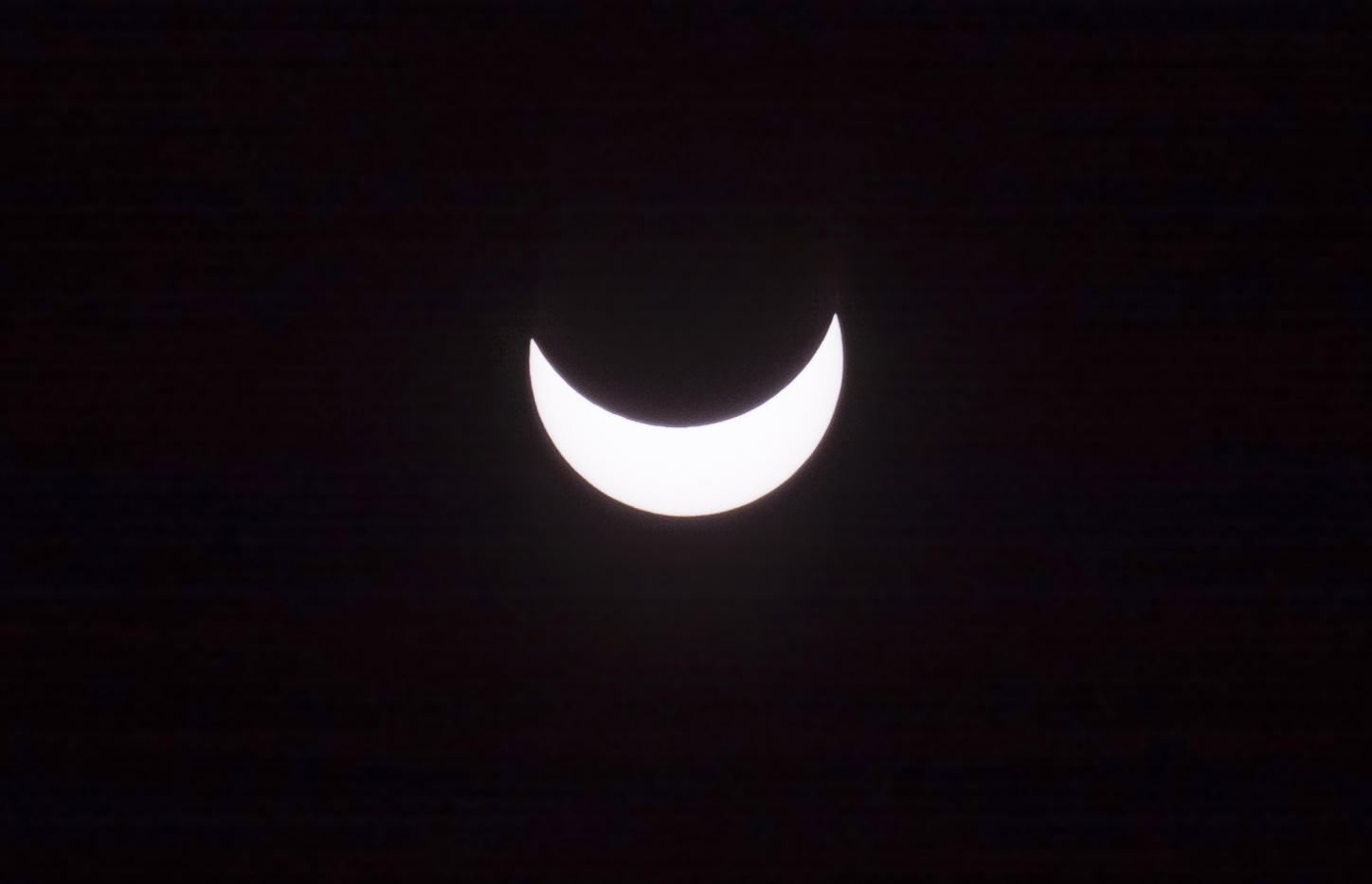
Kłodzko, Poland, 10:54 local time (9:54 UTC)

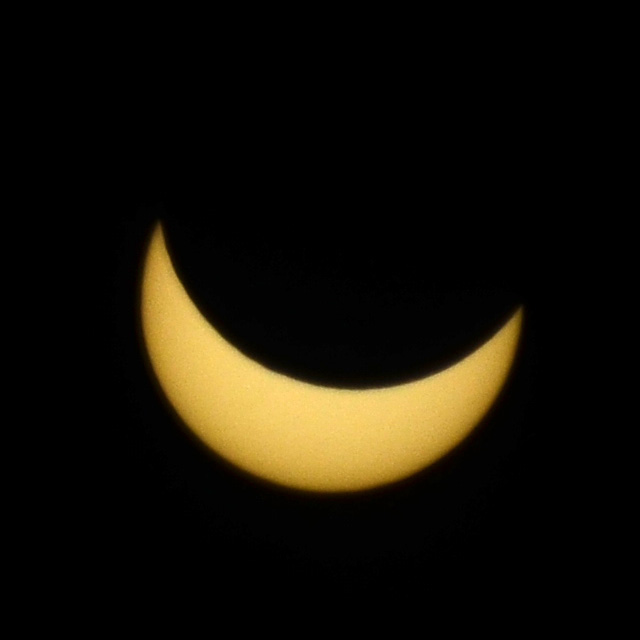
Warsaw, Poland, 10:56 local time (9:56 UTC)

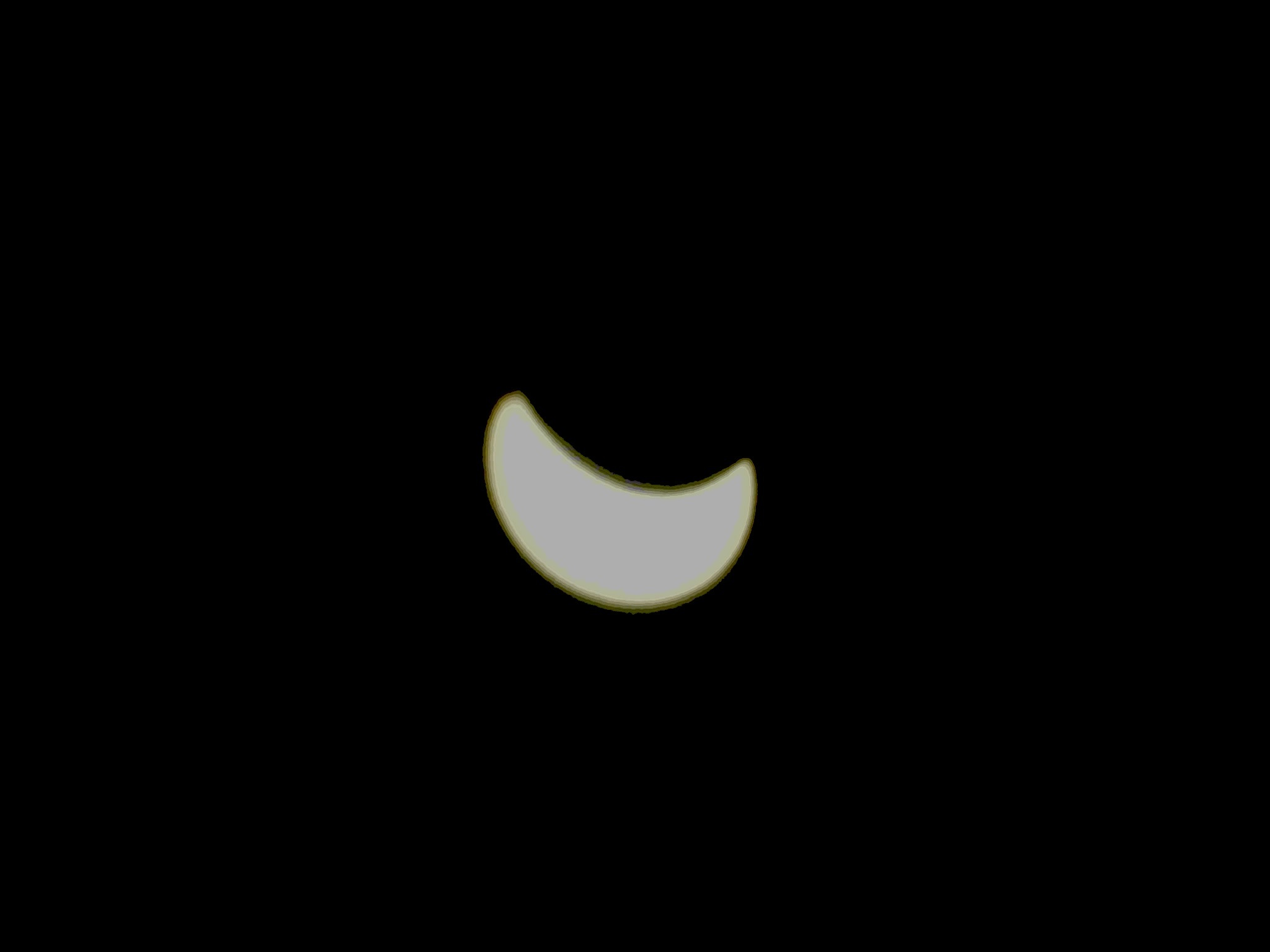
Budapest, Hungary, 11:00 local time (10:00 UTC)

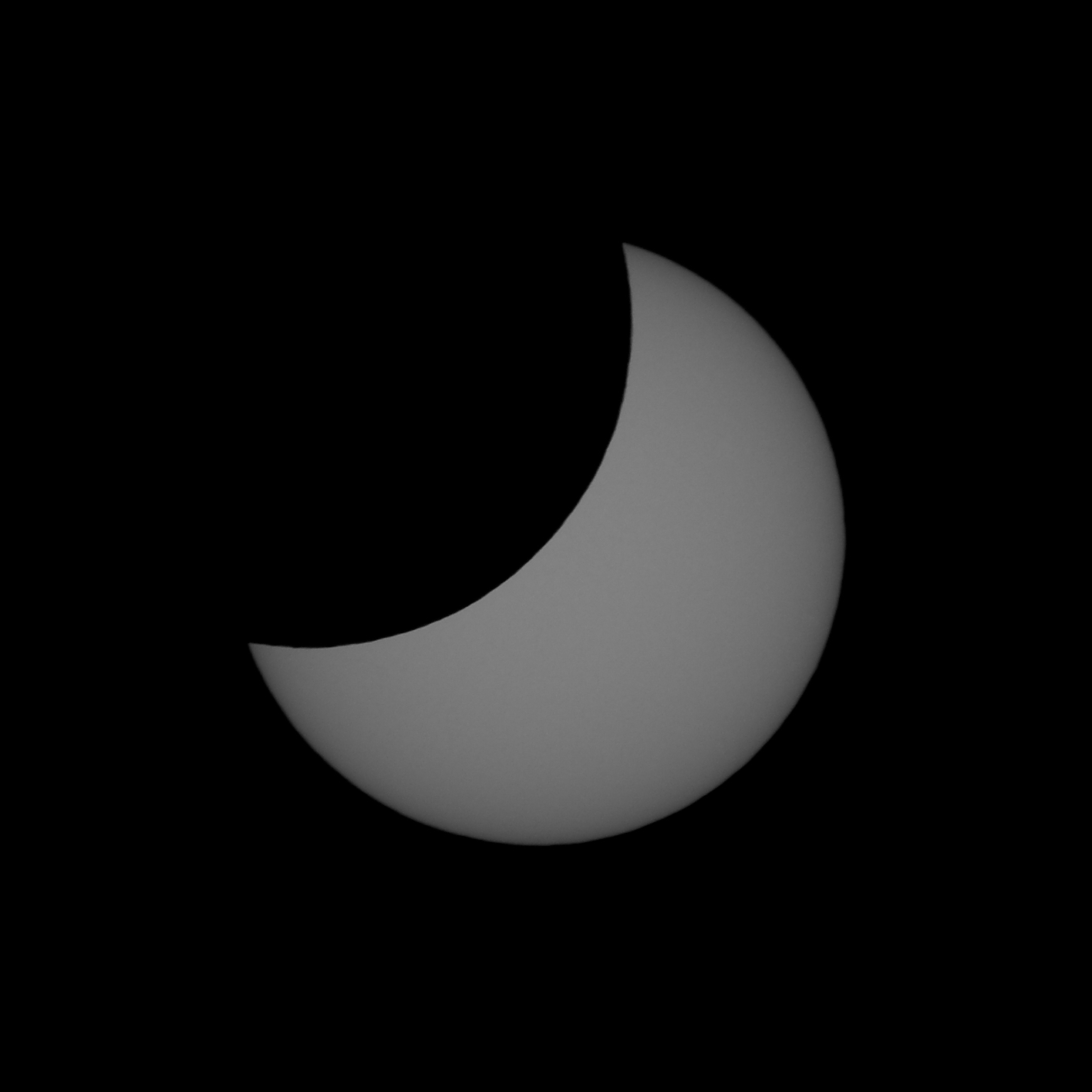
Bregenz, Austria, 11:06 local time (10:06 UTC)

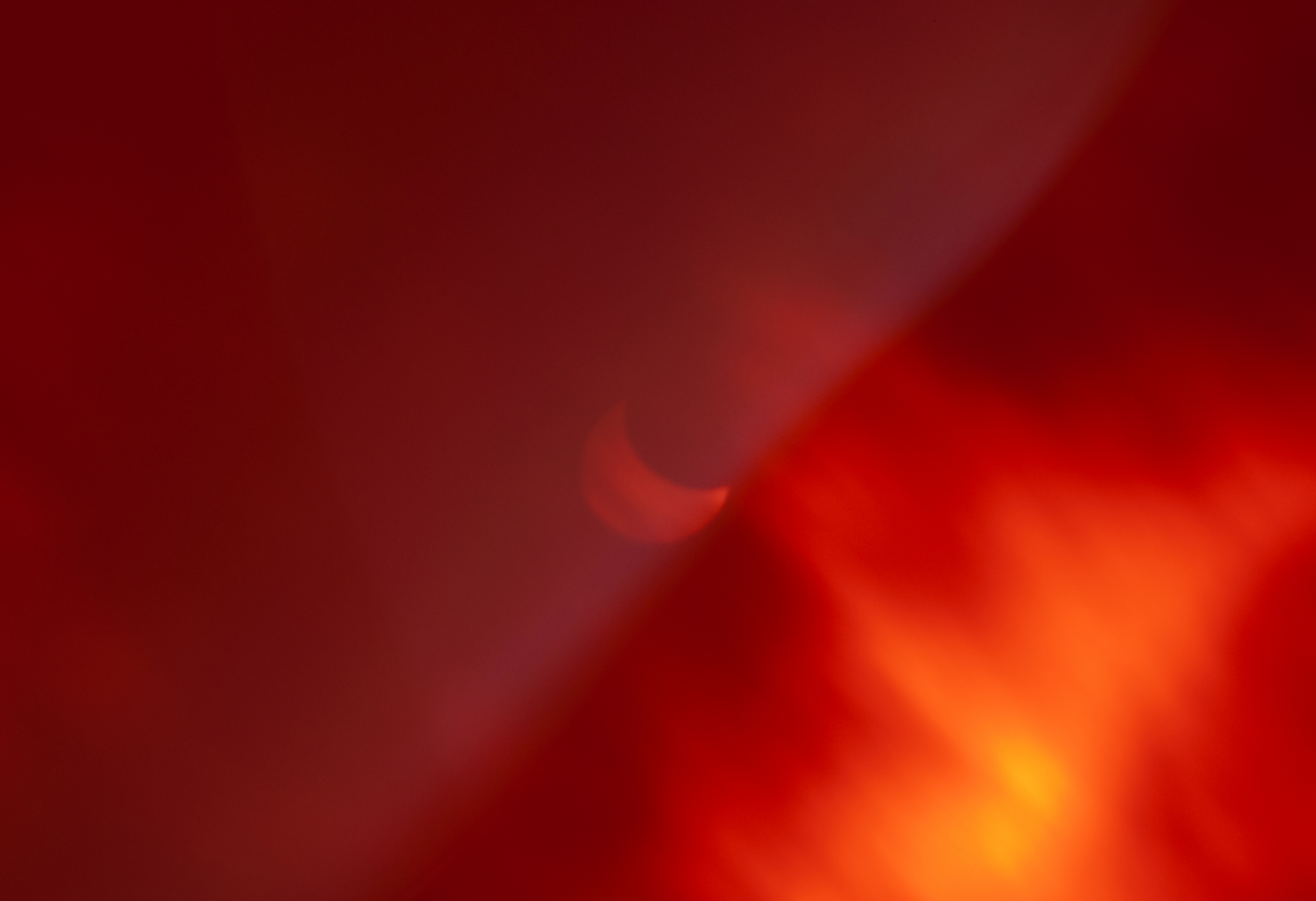
Milan, Italy, 11:08 (10:08 UTC) – unconfirmed source

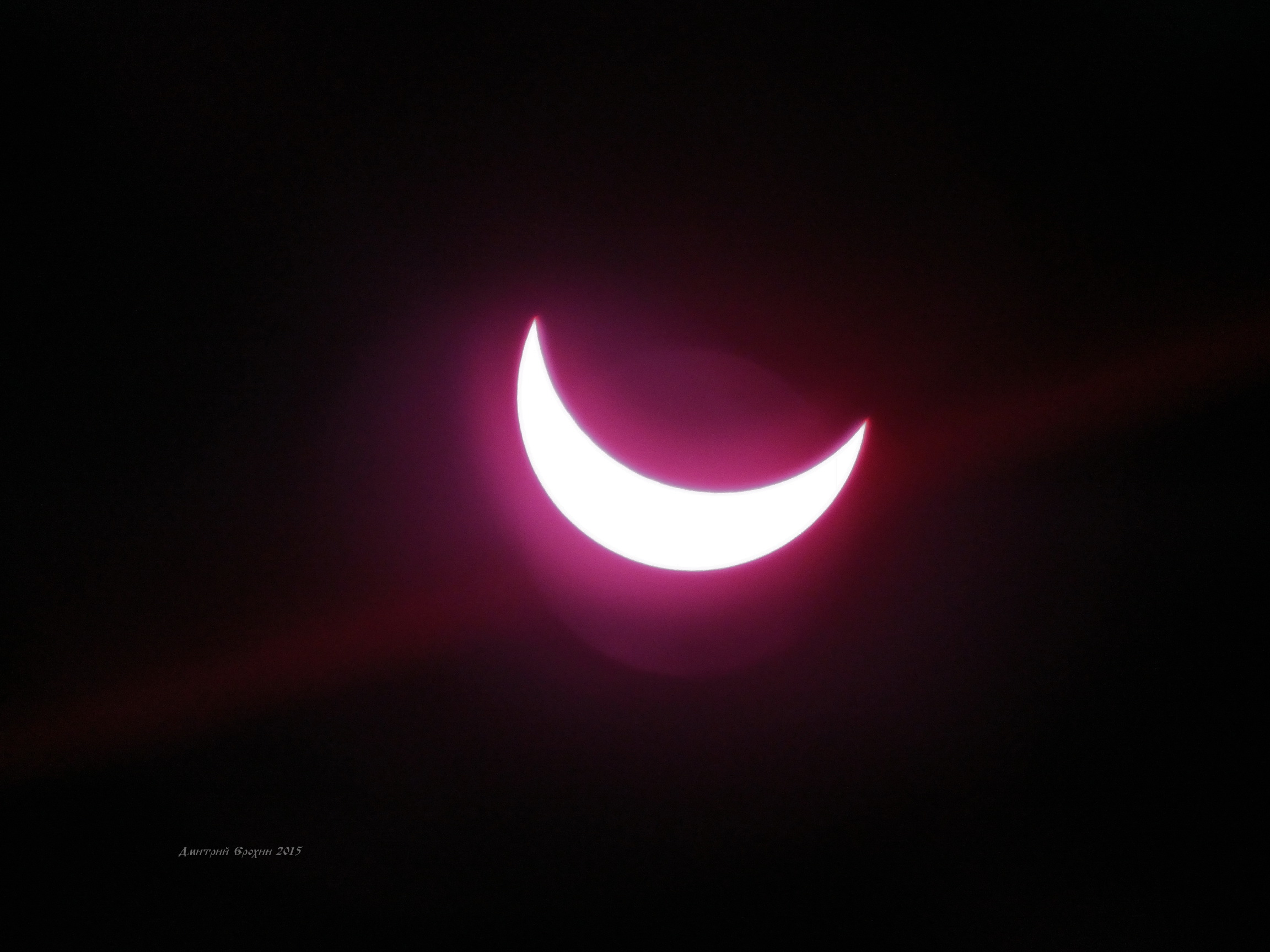
Petrozavodsk, Russia, 13:25 local time (10:25 UTC)

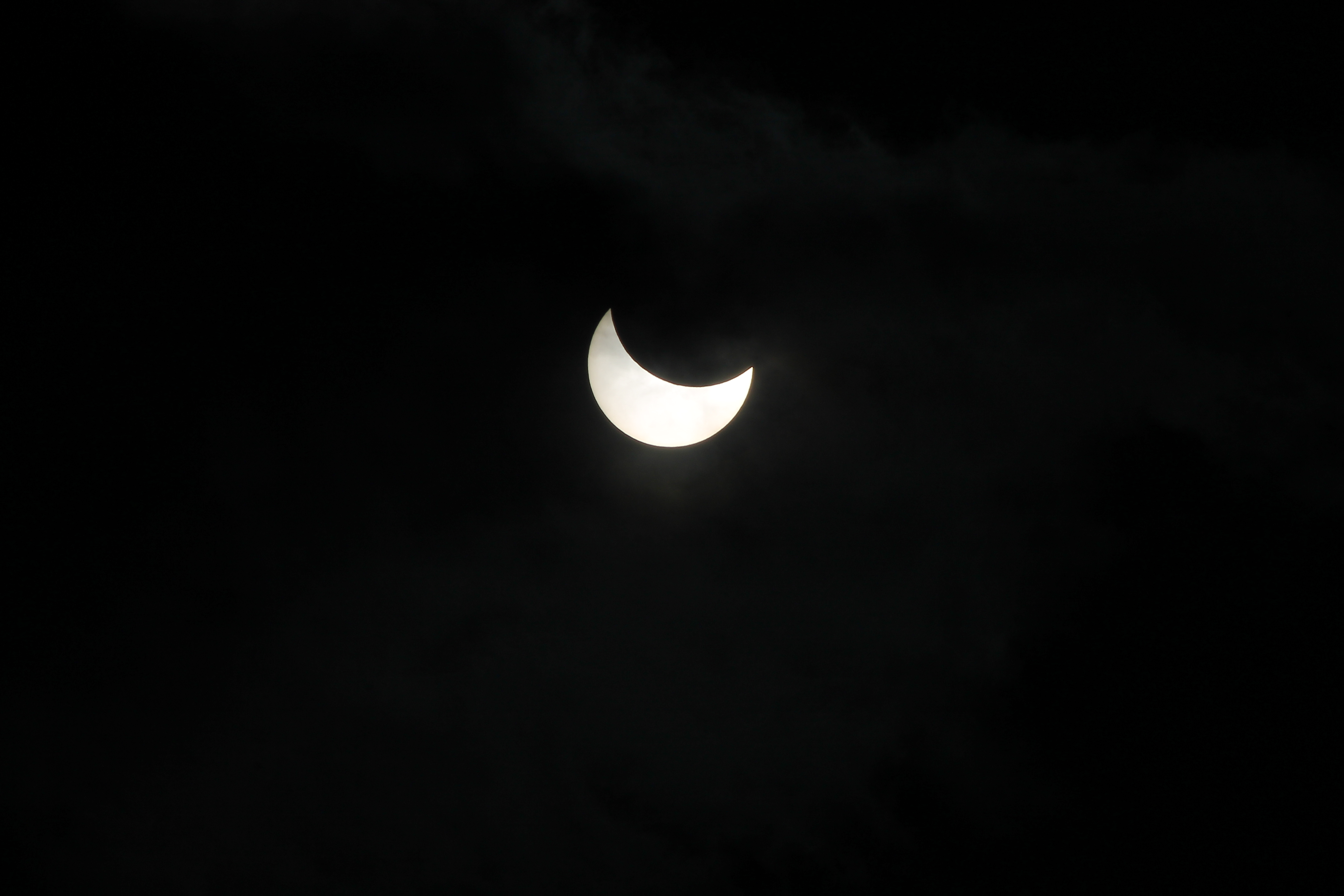
Kyiv, Ukraine, 12:28 local time (10:28 UTC)

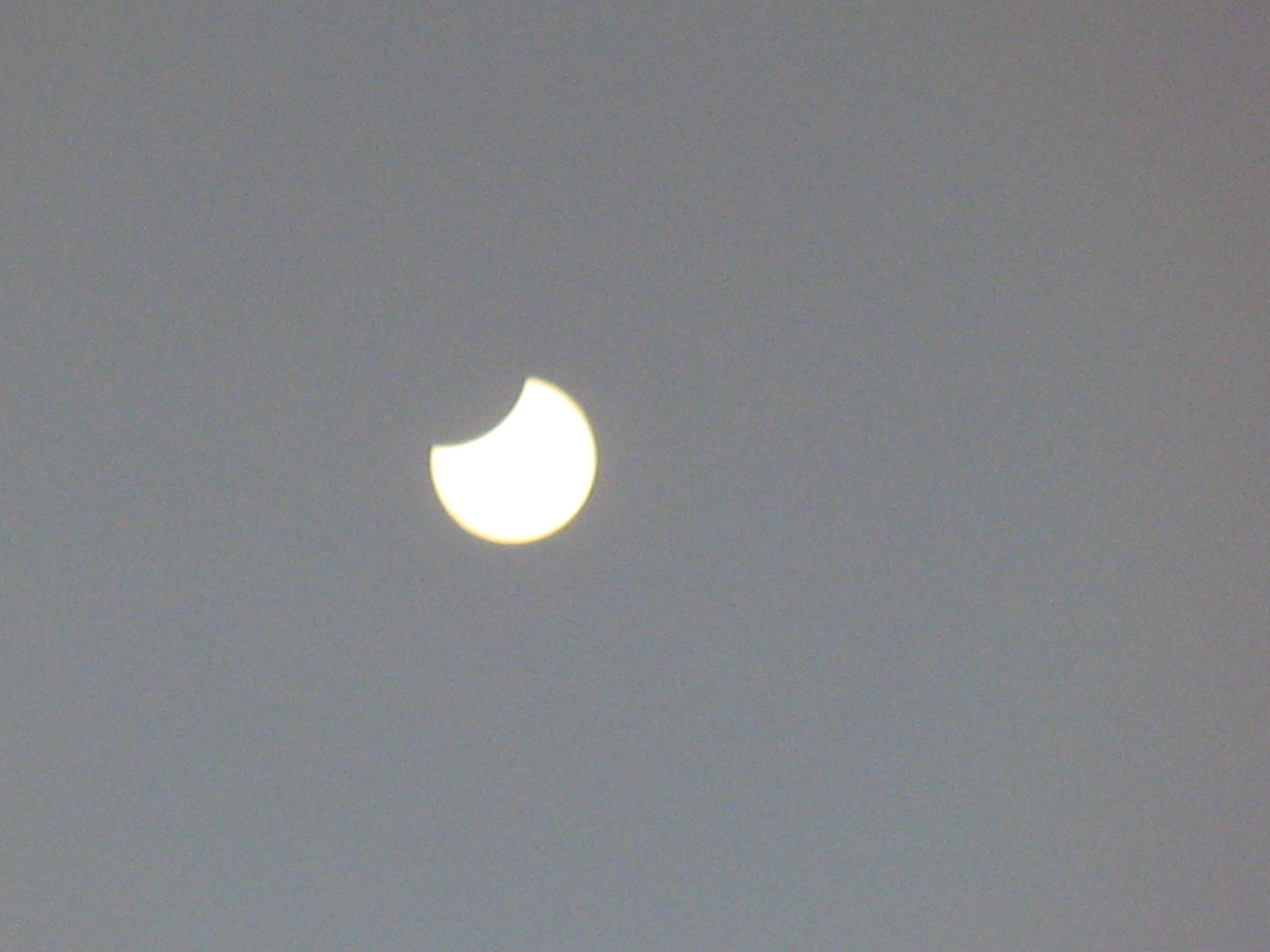
Ulcinj, Montenegro, 11:34 local time (10:34 UTC)

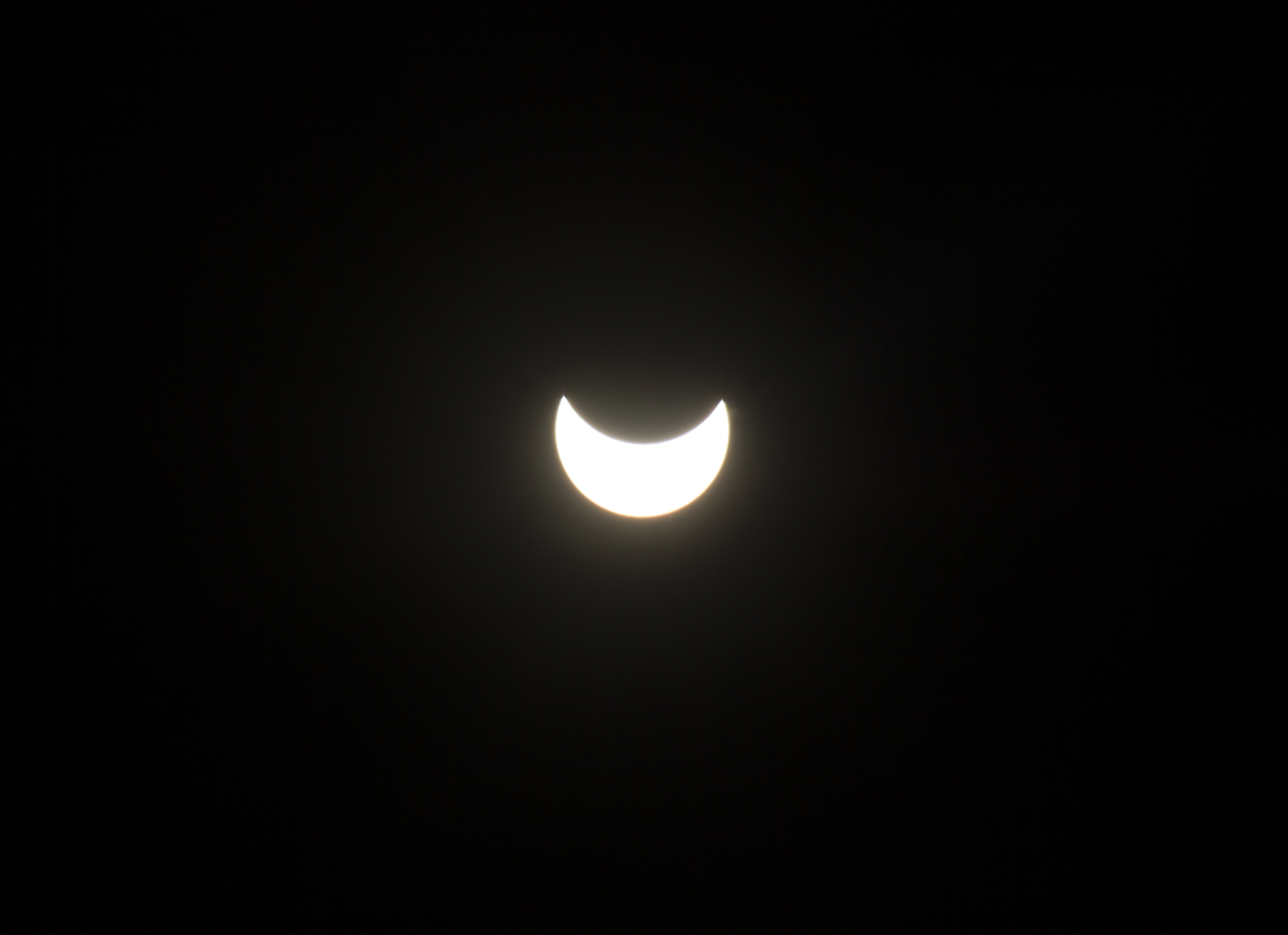
Moscow, Russia, 13:35 local time (10:35 UTC)

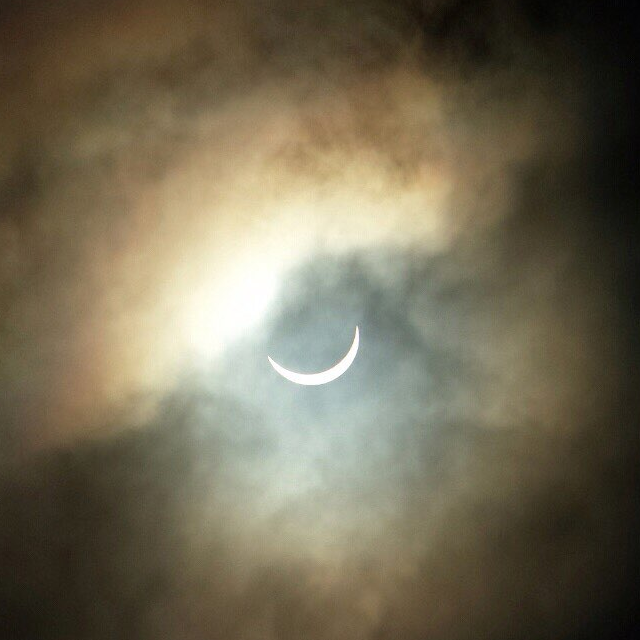
Leeds, United Kingdom, 10:30 UTC/GMT

== Eclipse details ==
Shown below are two tables displaying details about this particular solar eclipse. The first table outlines times at which the Moon's penumbra or umbra attains the specific parameter, and the second table describes various other parameters pertaining to this eclipse.

March 20, 2015 Solar Eclipse Times
Event	Time (UTC)
First Penumbral External Contact	2015 March 20 at 07:41:59.5 UTC
First Umbral External Contact	2015 March 20 at 09:10:40.3 UTC
First Central Line	2015 March 20 at 09:13:50.9 UTC
First Umbral Internal Contact	2015 March 20 at 09:17:19.8 UTC
Ecliptic Conjunction	2015 March 20 at 09:37:18.1 UTC
Greatest Duration	2015 March 20 at 09:46:24.2 UTC
Greatest Eclipse	2015 March 20 at 09:46:46.8 UTC
Equatorial Conjunction	2015 March 20 at 10:18:14.1 UTC
Last Umbral Internal Contact	2015 March 20 at 10:15:51.3 UTC
Last Central Line	2015 March 20 at 10:19:19.7 UTC
Last Umbral External Contact	2015 March 20 at 10:22:29.9 UTC
Last Penumbral External Contact	2015 March 20 at 11:51:20.4 UTC

March 20, 2015 Solar Eclipse Parameters
Parameter	Value
Eclipse Magnitude	1.04455
Eclipse Obscuration	1.09109
Gamma	0.94536
Sun Right Ascension	23h58m01.5s
Sun Declination	-00°12'50.4"
Sun Semi-Diameter	16'03.7"
Sun Equatorial Horizontal Parallax	08.8"
Moon Right Ascension	23h56m50.5s
Moon Declination	+00°42'08.7"
Moon Semi-Diameter	16'41.6"
Moon Equatorial Horizontal Parallax	1°01'15.8"
ΔT	67.7 s

== Eclipse season ==
This eclipse is part of an eclipse season, a period, roughly every six months, when eclipses occur. Only two (or occasionally three) eclipse seasons occur each year, and each season lasts about 35 days and repeats just short of six months (173 days) later; thus two full eclipse seasons always occur each year. Either two or three eclipses happen each eclipse season. In the sequence below, each eclipse is separated by a fortnight.

Eclipse season of March–April 2015
March 20 Descending node (new moon)	April 4 Ascending node (full moon)
Total solar eclipse Solar Saros 120	Total lunar eclipse Lunar Saros 132

== Related eclipses ==
=== Eclipses in 2015 ===
- A total solar eclipse on March 20.
- A total lunar eclipse on April 4.
- A partial solar eclipse on September 13.
- A total lunar eclipse on September 28.

=== Metonic ===
- Preceded by: Solar eclipse of June 1, 2011
- Followed by: Solar eclipse of January 6, 2019

=== Tzolkinex ===
- Preceded by: Solar eclipse of February 7, 2008
- Followed by: Solar eclipse of April 30, 2022

=== Half-Saros ===
- Preceded by: Lunar eclipse of March 14, 2006
- Followed by: Lunar eclipse of March 25, 2024

=== Tritos ===
- Preceded by: Solar eclipse of April 19, 2004
- Followed by: Solar eclipse of February 17, 2026

=== Solar Saros 120 ===
- Preceded by: Solar eclipse of March 9, 1997
- Followed by: Solar eclipse of March 30, 2033

=== Inex ===
- Preceded by: Solar eclipse of April 9, 1986
- Followed by: Solar eclipse of February 28, 2044

=== Triad ===
- Preceded by: Solar eclipse of May 19, 1928
- Followed by: Solar eclipse of January 19, 2102

=== Solar eclipses of 2015–2018 ===
This eclipse is a member of a semester series. An eclipse in a semester series of solar eclipses repeats approximately every 177 days and 4 hours (a semester) at alternating nodes of the Moon's orbit.

The partial solar eclipse on July 13, 2018 occurs in the next lunar year eclipse set.

Solar eclipse series sets from 2015 to 2018
Descending node			Ascending node		
Saros	Map	Gamma	Saros	Map	Gamma
120 Totality in Longyearbyen, Svalbard	March 20, 2015 Total	0.94536	125 Solar Dynamics Observatory	September 13, 2015 Partial	−1.10039
130 Balikpapan, Indonesia	March 9, 2016 Total	0.26092	135 Annularity in L'Étang-Salé, Réunion	September 1, 2016 Annular	−0.33301
140 Partial from Buenos Aires, Argentina	February 26, 2017 Annular	−0.45780	145 Totality in Madras, OR, USA	August 21, 2017 Total	0.43671
150 Partial in Olivos, Buenos Aires, Argentina	February 15, 2018 Partial	−1.21163	155 Partial in Huittinen, Finland	August 11, 2018 Partial	1.14758

=== Saros 120 ===
This eclipse is a part of Saros series 120, repeating every 18 years, 11 days, and containing 71 events. The series started with a partial solar eclipse on May 27, 933 AD. It contains annular eclipses from August 11, 1059 through April 26, 1492; hybrid eclipses from May 8, 1510 through June 8, 1564; and total eclipses from June 20, 1582 through March 30, 2033. The series ends at member 71 as a partial eclipse on July 7, 2195. Its eclipses are tabulated in three columns; every third eclipse in the same column is one exeligmos apart, so they all cast shadows over approximately the same parts of the Earth.

The longest duration of annularity was produced by member 11 at 6 minutes, 24 seconds on September 11, 1113, and the longest duration of totality was produced by member 60 at 2 minutes, 50 seconds on March 9, 1997. All eclipses in this series occur at the Moon’s descending node of orbit.

Series members 50–71 occur between 1801 and 2195:
50	51	52
November 19, 1816	November 30, 1834	December 11, 1852
53	54	55
December 22, 1870	January 1, 1889	January 14, 1907
56	57	58
January 24, 1925	February 4, 1943	February 15, 1961
59	60	61
February 26, 1979	March 9, 1997	March 20, 2015
62	63	64
March 30, 2033	April 11, 2051	April 21, 2069
65	66	67
May 2, 2087	May 14, 2105	May 25, 2123
68	69	70
June 4, 2141	June 16, 2159	June 26, 2177
71
July 7, 2195

=== Metonic series ===
The metonic series repeats eclipses every 19 years (6939.69 days), lasting about 5 cycles. Eclipses occur in nearly the same calendar date. In addition, the octon subseries repeats 1/5 of that or every 3.8 years (1387.94 days). All eclipses in this table occur at the Moon's descending node.

22 eclipse events between June 1, 2011 and October 24, 2098
May 31–June 1	March 19–20	January 5–6	October 24–25	August 12–13
118	120	122	124	126
June 1, 2011	March 20, 2015	January 6, 2019	October 25, 2022	August 12, 2026
128	130	132	134	136
June 1, 2030	March 20, 2034	January 5, 2038	October 25, 2041	August 12, 2045
138	140	142	144	146
May 31, 2049	March 20, 2053	January 5, 2057	October 24, 2060	August 12, 2064
148	150	152	154	156
May 31, 2068	March 19, 2072	January 6, 2076	October 24, 2079	August 13, 2083
158	160	162	164	
June 1, 2087			October 24, 2098	

=== Tritos series ===
This eclipse is a part of a tritos cycle, repeating at alternating nodes every 135 synodic months (≈ 3986.63 days, or 11 years minus 1 month). Their appearance and longitude are irregular due to a lack of synchronization with the anomalistic month (period of perigee), but groupings of 3 tritos cycles (≈ 33 years minus 3 months) come close (≈ 434.044 anomalistic months), so eclipses are similar in these groupings.

The partial solar eclipses on March 27, 1884 (part of Saros 108) and December 24, 1916 (part of Saros 111) are also a part of this series but are not included in the table below.

Series members between 1971 and 2200
July 22, 1971 (Saros 116)	June 21, 1982 (Saros 117)	May 21, 1993 (Saros 118)	April 19, 2004 (Saros 119)	March 20, 2015 (Saros 120)
February 17, 2026 (Saros 121)	January 16, 2037 (Saros 122)	December 16, 2047 (Saros 123)	November 16, 2058 (Saros 124)	October 15, 2069 (Saros 125)
September 13, 2080 (Saros 126)	August 15, 2091 (Saros 127)	July 15, 2102 (Saros 128)	June 13, 2113 (Saros 129)	May 14, 2124 (Saros 130)
April 13, 2135 (Saros 131)	March 12, 2146 (Saros 132)	February 9, 2157 (Saros 133)	January 10, 2168 (Saros 134)	December 9, 2178 (Saros 135)
November 8, 2189 (Saros 136)	October 9, 2200 (Saros 137)			

=== Inex series ===
This eclipse is a part of the long period inex cycle, repeating at alternating nodes, every 358 synodic months (≈ 10,571.95 days, or 29 years minus 20 days). Their appearance and longitude are irregular due to a lack of synchronization with the anomalistic month (period of perigee). However, groupings of 3 inex cycles (≈ 87 years minus 2 months) comes close (≈ 1,151.02 anomalistic months), so eclipses are similar in these groupings.

Series members between 1801 and 2200
August 7, 1812 (Saros 113)	July 18, 1841 (Saros 114)	June 28, 1870 (Saros 115)
June 8, 1899 (Saros 116)	May 19, 1928 (Saros 117)	April 30, 1957 (Saros 118)
April 9, 1986 (Saros 119)	March 20, 2015 (Saros 120)	February 28, 2044 (Saros 121)
February 7, 2073 (Saros 122)	January 19, 2102 (Saros 123)	December 30, 2130 (Saros 124)
December 9, 2159 (Saros 125)	November 18, 2188 (Saros 126)	

== Bibliography ==
- NASA graphics
- Google interactive map of the eclipse from NASA
- NASA Besselian Elements – Partial Solar Eclipse of 2007 September 11
