= Solar eclipse of March 30, 2033 =

Total eclipse

- Total eclipse
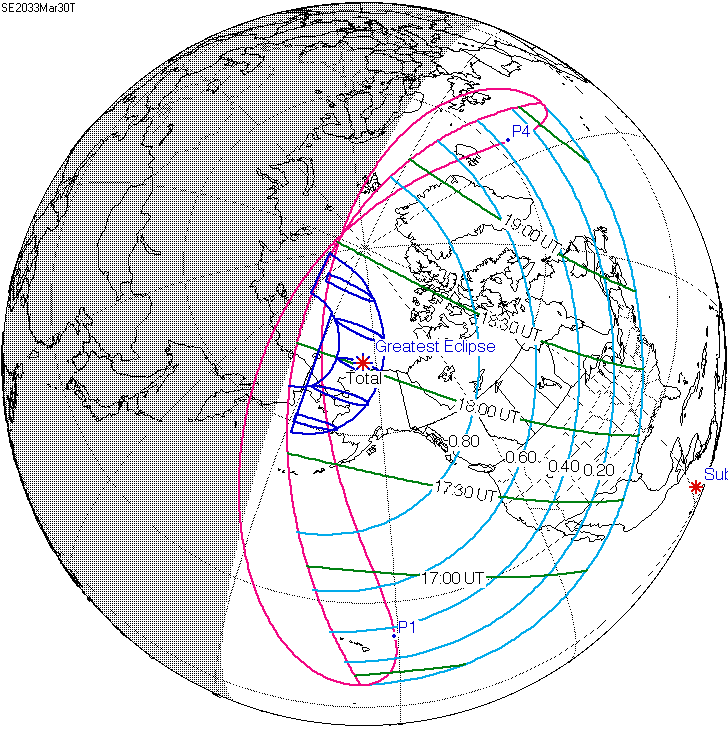
- Map
- Gamma: 0.9778
- Magnitude: 1.0462

Maximum eclipse
- Duration: 157 s (2 min 37 s)
- Coordinates: 71.3°N 155.8°W
- Max. width of band: 781 km (485 mi)

Times (UTC)
- Greatest eclipse: 18:02:36

References
- Saros: 120 (62 of 71)
- Catalog # (SE5000): 9581

A total solar eclipse will occur at the Moon's descending node of orbit on Wednesday, March 30, 2033, with a magnitude of 1.0462. A solar eclipse occurs when the Moon passes between Earth and the Sun, thereby totally or partly obscuring the image of the Sun for a viewer on Earth. A total solar eclipse occurs when the Moon's apparent diameter is larger than the Sun's, blocking all direct sunlight, turning day into darkness. Totality occurs in a narrow path across Earth's surface, with the partial solar eclipse visible over a surrounding region thousands of kilometres wide. Occurring about 11 hours after perigee (on March 30, 2033, at 7:10 UTC), the Moon's apparent diameter will be larger.

Totality will be visible from parts of the Russian Far East and Alaska, including in the cities of Nome, Alaska and Utqiaġvik, Alaska in the mid-morning hours. A partial eclipse will be visible for parts of eastern Russia, Hawaii, North America, Greenland, and Iceland. This will be the last of 55 umbral eclipses in Solar Saros 120.

== Images ==
Animated path

== Eclipse timing ==
=== Places experiencing total eclipse ===
Solar Eclipse of March 30, 2033 (Local Times)
Country or territory	City or place	Start of partial eclipse	Start of total eclipse	Maximum eclipse	End of total eclipse	End of partial eclipse	Duration of totality (min:s)	Duration of eclipse (hr:min)	Maximum magnitude
United States	Chevak	08:46:35	09:40:50	09:41:47	09:42:43	10:39:44	1:53	1:53	1.0081
United States	Nome	08:51:45	09:45:57	09:47:12	09:48:27	10:45:10	2:30	1:53	1.0229
Russia	Anadyr (Note: The times listed for this location occur on March 31, 2033, local time.)	05:31:28 (sunrise)	05:47:05	05:47:30	05:47:56	06:42:21	0:51	1:11	1.002
United States	Kotzebue	08:55:54	09:50:42	09:51:57	09:53:13	10:50:20	2:31	1:54	1.0195
United States	Noatak	08:57:07	09:51:54	09:53:08	09:54:21	10:51:24	2:27	1:54	1.0168
United States	Point Hope	08:58:37	09:53:08	09:54:04	09:55:01	10:51:40	1:53	1:53	1.0082
United States	Point Lay	09:01:01	09:55:59	09:57:05	09:58:11	10:55:10	2:12	1:54	1.0118
United States	Wainwright	09:02:42	09:57:58	09:59:11	10:00:25	10:57:38	2:27	1:55	1.016
United States	Atqasuk	09:02:32	09:58:06	09:59:24	10:00:42	10:58:14	2:36	1:56	1.0215
United States	Nuiqsut	09:02:40	09:59:21	10:00:28	10:01:35	11:00:17	2:14	1:58	1.0108
United States	Utqiagvik	09:04:03	09:59:41	10:00:59	10:02:17	10:59:47	2:36	1:56	1.0215
United States	Prudhoe Bay	09:03:07	10:00:33	10:01:18	10:02:03	11:01:28	1:30	1:58	1.0043

=== Places experiencing partial eclipse ===
Solar Eclipse of March 30, 2033 (Local Times)
Country or territory	City or place	Start of partial eclipse	Maximum eclipse	End of partial eclipse	Duration of eclipse (hr:min)	Maximum coverage
United States	Honolulu	06:25:46 (sunrise)	06:39:43	07:21:49	0:56	23.27%
Mexico	Tijuana	09:27:01	10:19:37	11:16:01	1:49	21.96%
United States	Los Angeles	09:25:58	10:20:44	11:19:34	1:54	26.42%
Mexico	Hermosillo	09:39:12	10:22:09	11:07:28	1:28	9.22%
United States	San Francisco	09:23:53	10:22:20	11:25:23	2:02	38.78%
United States	Phoenix	09:36:08	10:28:05	11:23:16	1:47	18.53%
United States	Seattle	09:36:16	10:39:23	11:46:35	2:10	58.82%
Canada	Vancouver	09:38:01	10:41:22	11:48:42	2:11	62.69%
United States	Anchorage	08:46:24	09:44:44	10:46:07	2:00	96.74%
Canada	Calgary	10:49:19	11:53:58	13:01:38	2:12	57.13%
Russia	Pevek	05:48:43 (sunrise)	05:56:52	06:51:03	1:02	98.97%
Canada	Edmonton	10:53:13	11:58:11	13:05:50	2:13	61.33%
Canada	Inuvik	11:03:25	12:03:59	13:06:33	2:03	94.96%
United States	Chicago	12:35:30	13:22:51	14:10:01	1:35	10.50%
Svalbard and Jan Mayen	Longyearbyen	19:57:06	20:28:29	20:39:55 (sunset)	0:43	47.82%
United States	Detroit	13:48:24	14:31:39	15:14:21	1:26	7.86%
Canada	Toronto	13:56:16	14:38:59	15:20:52	1:25	7.88%
United States	Washington, D.C.	14:29:02	14:40:53	14:52:39	0:24	0.14%
Greenland	Qaanaaq	16:42:14	17:41:25	18:39:54	1:58	80.24%
Greenland	Pituffik	14:42:54	15:42:16	16:40:54	1:58	78.42%
Canada	Ottawa	14:02:06	14:45:48	15:28:24	1:26	9.08%
United States	New York City	14:26:50	14:47:23	15:07:38	0:41	0.80%
Svalbard and Jan Mayen	Ny-Ålesund	19:56:11	20:48:59	21:01:43 (sunset)	1:06	80.54%
Canada	Montreal	14:07:25	14:49:14	15:29:55	1:23	8.04%
Ireland	Dublin	19:47:28	19:53:31	19:57:07 (sunset)	0:10	2.48%
United Kingdom	Stornoway	19:36:04	19:58:45	20:02:50 (sunset)	0:27	18.44%
Greenland	Nuuk	17:05:28	18:01:48	18:56:04	1:51	45.13%
Faroe Islands	Tórshavn	19:27:59	20:05:01	20:09:38 (sunset)	0:42	35.72%
Iceland	Reykjavík	18:21:35	19:11:56	20:00:21	1:39	42.60%
Canada	St. John's	16:14:07	16:45:34	17:15:55	1:02	4.64%

== Eclipse details ==
Shown below are two tables displaying details about this particular solar eclipse. The first table outlines times at which the Moon's penumbra or umbra attains the specific parameter, and the second table describes various other parameters pertaining to this eclipse.

March 30, 2033 Solar Eclipse Times
Event	Time (UTC)
First Penumbral External Contact	2033 March 30 at 16:00:45.9 UTC
First Umbral External Contact	2033 March 30 at 17:37:02.7 UTC
First Central Line	2033 March 30 at 17:42:17.4 UTC
First Umbral Internal Contact	2033 March 30 at 17:49:24.8 UTC
Ecliptic Conjunction	2033 March 30 at 17:52:49.1 UTC
Greatest Duration	2033 March 30 at 18:02:19.5 UTC
Greatest Eclipse	2033 March 30 at 18:02:35.7 UTC
Last Umbral Internal Contact	2033 March 30 at 18:15:23.7 UTC
Last Central Line	2033 March 30 at 18:22:30.8 UTC
Last Umbral External Contact	2033 March 30 at 18:27:45.2 UTC
Equatorial Conjunction	2033 March 30 at 18:34:26.6 UTC
Last Penumbral External Contact	2033 March 30 at 20:04:11.4 UTC

March 30, 2033 Solar Eclipse Parameters
Parameter	Value
Eclipse Magnitude	1.04616
Eclipse Obscuration	1.09444
Gamma	0.97777
Sun Right Ascension	00h38m02.8s
Sun Declination	+04°05'47.8"
Sun Semi-Diameter	16'00.8"
Sun Equatorial Horizontal Parallax	08.8"
Moon Right Ascension	00h36m50.4s
Moon Declination	+05°02'48.6"
Moon Semi-Diameter	16'42.2"
Moon Equatorial Horizontal Parallax	1°01'18.3"
ΔT	75.3 s

== Eclipse season ==
This eclipse is part of an eclipse season, a period, roughly every six months, when eclipses occur. Only two (or occasionally three) eclipse seasons occur each year, and each season lasts about 35 days and repeats just short of six months (173 days) later; thus two full eclipse seasons always occur each year. Either two or three eclipses happen each eclipse season. In the sequence below, each eclipse is separated by a fortnight.

Eclipse season of March–April 2033
March 30 Descending node (new moon)	April 14 Ascending node (full moon)
Partial solar eclipse Solar Saros 120	Total lunar eclipse Lunar Saros 132

== Related eclipses ==
=== Eclipses in 2033 ===
- A total solar eclipse on March 30.
- A total lunar eclipse on April 14.
- A partial solar eclipse on September 23.
- A total lunar eclipse on October 8.

=== Metonic ===
- Preceded by: Solar eclipse of June 12, 2029
- Followed by: Solar eclipse of January 16, 2037

=== Tzolkinex ===
- Preceded by: Solar eclipse of February 17, 2026
- Followed by: Solar eclipse of May 11, 2040

=== Half-Saros ===
- Preceded by: Lunar eclipse of March 25, 2024
- Followed by: Lunar eclipse of April 5, 2042

=== Tritos ===
- Preceded by: Solar eclipse of April 30, 2022
- Followed by: Solar eclipse of February 28, 2044

=== Solar Saros 120 ===
- Preceded by: Solar eclipse of March 20, 2015
- Followed by: Solar eclipse of April 11, 2051

=== Inex ===
- Preceded by: Solar eclipse of April 19, 2004
- Followed by: Solar eclipse of March 11, 2062

=== Triad ===
- Preceded by: Solar eclipse of May 30, 1946
- Followed by: Solar eclipse of January 30, 2120

=== Solar eclipses of 2033–2036 ===
This eclipse is a member of a semester series. An eclipse in a semester series of solar eclipses repeats approximately every 177 days and 4 hours (a semester) at alternating nodes of the Moon's orbit.

The partial solar eclipse on July 23, 2036 occurs in the next lunar year eclipse set.

Solar eclipse series sets from 2033 to 2036
Descending node			Ascending node		
Saros	Map	Gamma	Saros	Map	Gamma
120	March 30, 2033 Total	0.9778	125	September 23, 2033 Partial	−1.1583
130	March 20, 2034 Total	0.2894	135	September 12, 2034 Annular	−0.3936
140	March 9, 2035 Annular	−0.4368	145	September 2, 2035 Total	0.3727
150	February 27, 2036 Partial	−1.1942	155	August 21, 2036 Partial	1.0825

=== Saros 120 ===
This eclipse is a part of Saros series 120, repeating every 18 years, 11 days, and containing 71 events. The series started with a partial solar eclipse on May 27, 933 AD. It contains annular eclipses from August 11, 1059 through April 26, 1492; hybrid eclipses from May 8, 1510 through June 8, 1564; and total eclipses from June 20, 1582 through March 30, 2033. The series ends at member 71 as a partial eclipse on July 7, 2195. Its eclipses are tabulated in three columns; every third eclipse in the same column is one exeligmos apart, so they all cast shadows over approximately the same parts of the Earth.

The longest duration of annularity was produced by member 11 at 6 minutes, 24 seconds on September 11, 1113, and the longest duration of totality was produced by member 60 at 2 minutes, 50 seconds on March 9, 1997. All eclipses in this series occur at the Moon’s descending node of orbit.

Series members 50–71 occur between 1801 and 2195:
50	51	52
November 19, 1816	November 30, 1834	December 11, 1852
53	54	55
December 22, 1870	January 1, 1889	January 14, 1907
56	57	58
January 24, 1925	February 4, 1943	February 15, 1961
59	60	61
February 26, 1979	March 9, 1997	March 20, 2015
62	63	64
March 30, 2033	April 11, 2051	April 21, 2069
65	66	67
May 2, 2087	May 14, 2105	May 25, 2123
68	69	70
June 4, 2141	June 16, 2159	June 26, 2177
71
July 7, 2195

=== Metonic series ===
The metonic series repeats eclipses every 19 years (6939.69 days), lasting about 5 cycles. Eclipses occur in nearly the same calendar date. In addition, the octon subseries repeats 1/5 of that or every 3.8 years (1387.94 days). All eclipses in this table occur at the Moon's descending node.

22 eclipse events between June 12, 2029 and November 4, 2116
June 11–12	March 30–31	January 16	November 4–5	August 23–24
118	120	122	124	126
June 12, 2029	March 30, 2033	January 16, 2037	November 4, 2040	August 23, 2044
128	130	132	134	136
June 11, 2048	March 30, 2052	January 16, 2056	November 5, 2059	August 24, 2063
138	140	142	144	146
June 11, 2067	March 31, 2071	January 16, 2075	November 4, 2078	August 24, 2082
148	150	152	154	156
June 11, 2086	March 31, 2090	January 16, 2094	November 4, 2097	August 24, 2101
158	160	162	164	
June 12, 2105			November 4, 2116	

=== Tritos series ===
This eclipse is a part of a tritos cycle, repeating at alternating nodes every 135 synodic months (≈ 3986.63 days, or 11 years minus 1 month). Their appearance and longitude are irregular due to a lack of synchronization with the anomalistic month (period of perigee), but groupings of 3 tritos cycles (≈ 33 years minus 3 months) come close (≈ 434.044 anomalistic months), so eclipses are similar in these groupings.

The partial solar eclipses on April 8, 1902 (part of Saros 108) and January 5, 1935 (part of Saros 111) are also a part of this series but are not included in the table below.

Series members between 2000 and 2200
July 1, 2000 (Saros 117)	June 1, 2011 (Saros 118)	April 30, 2022 (Saros 119)	March 30, 2033 (Saros 120)	February 28, 2044 (Saros 121)
January 27, 2055 (Saros 122)	December 27, 2065 (Saros 123)	November 26, 2076 (Saros 124)	October 26, 2087 (Saros 125)	September 25, 2098 (Saros 126)
August 26, 2109 (Saros 127)	July 25, 2120 (Saros 128)	June 25, 2131 (Saros 129)	May 25, 2142 (Saros 130)	April 23, 2153 (Saros 131)
March 23, 2164 (Saros 132)	February 21, 2175 (Saros 133)	January 20, 2186 (Saros 134)	December 19, 2196 (Saros 135)	

=== Inex series ===
This eclipse is a part of the long period inex cycle, repeating at alternating nodes, every 358 synodic months (≈ 10,571.95 days, or 29 years minus 20 days). Their appearance and longitude are irregular due to a lack of synchronization with the anomalistic month (period of perigee). However, groupings of 3 inex cycles (≈ 87 years minus 2 months) comes close (≈ 1,151.02 anomalistic months), so eclipses are similar in these groupings.

Series members between 1801 and 2200
September 8, 1801 (Saros 112)	August 18, 1830 (Saros 113)	July 29, 1859 (Saros 114)
July 9, 1888 (Saros 115)	June 19, 1917 (Saros 116)	May 30, 1946 (Saros 117)
May 11, 1975 (Saros 118)	April 19, 2004 (Saros 119)	March 30, 2033 (Saros 120)
March 11, 2062 (Saros 121)	February 18, 2091 (Saros 122)	January 30, 2120 (Saros 123)
January 9, 2149 (Saros 124)	December 20, 2177 (Saros 125)	
