= Solar eclipse of March 9, 1997 =

Total eclipse

- Total eclipse
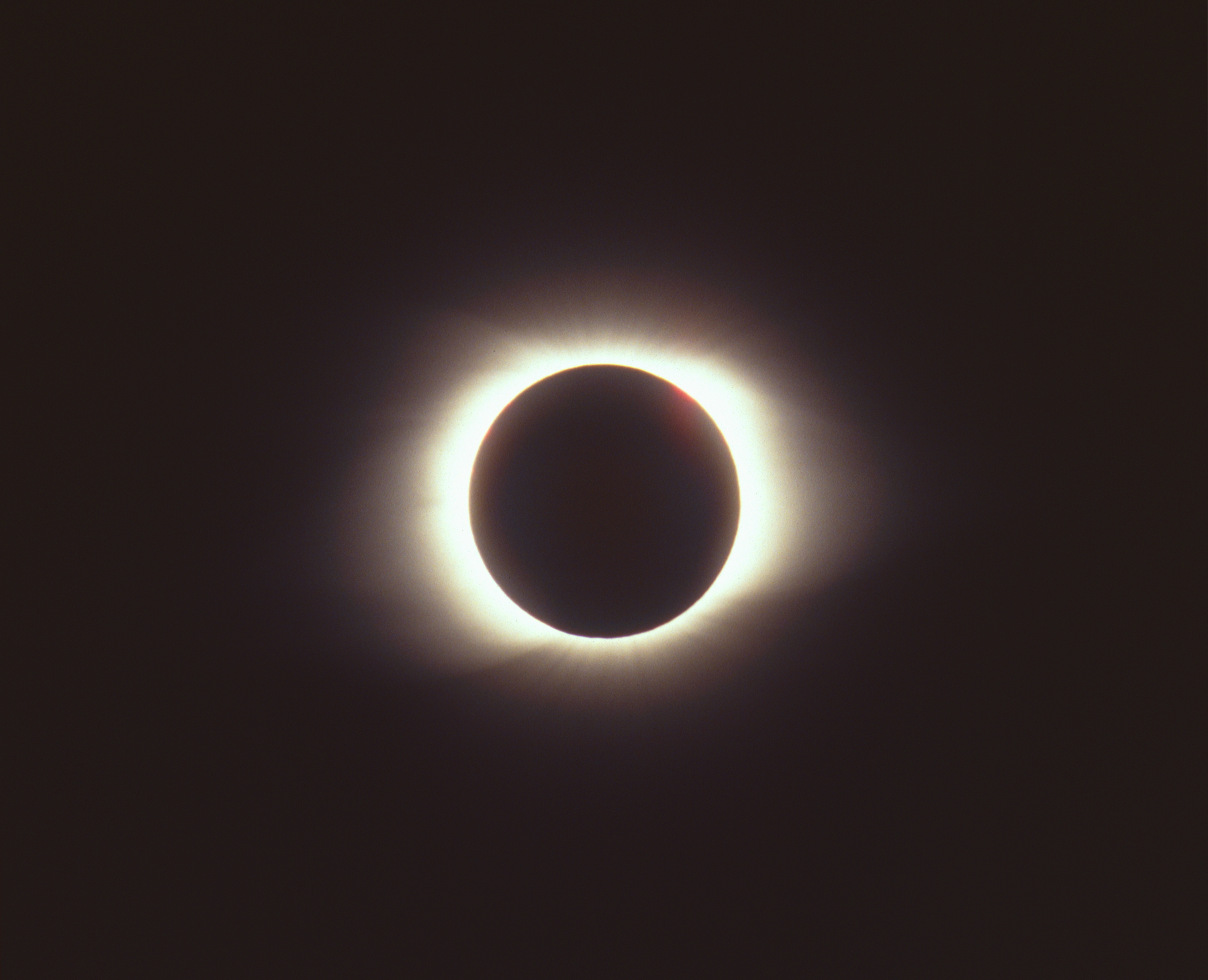
- Total eclipse from Chita, Russia

- Map
- Gamma: 0.9183
- Magnitude: 1.042

Maximum eclipse
- Duration: 170 s (2 min 50 s)
- Coordinates: 57.8°N 130.7°E
- Max. width of band: 356 km (221 mi)

Times (UTC)
- Greatest eclipse: 1:24:51

References
- Saros: 120 (60 of 71)
- Catalog # (SE5000): 9501

A total solar eclipse occurred at the Moon's descending node of orbit between Saturday, March 8 and Sunday, March 9, 1997, with a magnitude of 1.042. A solar eclipse occurs when the Moon passes between Earth and the Sun, thereby totally or partly obscuring the image of the Sun for a viewer on Earth. A total solar eclipse occurs when the Moon's apparent diameter is larger than the Sun's, blocking all direct sunlight, turning day into darkness. Totality occurs in a narrow path across Earth's surface, with the partial solar eclipse visible over a surrounding region thousands of kilometres wide. Occurring about 18.5 hours after perigee (on March 8, 1997, at 9:00 UTC), the Moon's apparent diameter was larger.

Totality was visible in eastern Russia, northern Mongolia, the northern tip of Xinjiang and Northeastern China and the eastern tip of Kazakhstan. A partial eclipse was visible for parts of Southeast Asia, East Asia, Alaska, and western Canada.

== Unusual gravity variations ==
This solar eclipse is somewhat special in the sense that some unexplained gravity anomalies of about 7 $\times$ 10^{−8} m/s^{2} during the solar eclipse were observed. Attempts (e.g., Van Flandern–Yang hypothesis) to explain these anomalies have not been able to reach a definite conclusion.

== Observations ==

=== Russia ===
Russian Academy of Sciences sent an observation team near Lake Baikal to study multiple aspects of the solar corona, providing complement to the imperfections of the corona observation of the Solar and Heliospheric Observatory spacecraft.

=== China ===
In China, only a partial eclipse was visible from most areas. The path of totality covered only two narrow areas not adjacent to each other. In Northwestern China, it covered the northern part of Altay Prefecture, Xinjiang. In Northeast China, it covered the northern part of Hulunbuir League (now the city of Hulumbuir), Inner Mongolia and the northern part of neighbouring Daxing'anling Prefecture, Heilongjiang. Therefore, observations of the total eclipse in China are concentrated in these two areas.

In Altay Prefecture, Xinjiang, the total phase occurred right after sunrise. By observing the change in the brightness in Altay, the Xia–Shang–Zhou Chronology Project concluded that the phrase of "day dawned twice in Zheng" in the ancient chronicle Bamboo Annals referred to a solar eclipse on April 21, 899 BC which also occurred right after sunrise, thus determining the year of the Battle of Muye and the starting year of the Zhou dynasty. However, doubts also exist on this conclusion. For example, Douglas J. Keenan published on the journal East Asian History, stating that calculations show that the eclipse in 899 BC reduced the brightness perceived subjectively by a human observer by less than 25%, and clouds can even cause the same effect very often, thus questioning the conclusion.

Mohe County (now Mohe City), Heilongjiang, the northernmost county in China, was considered the best observation site in China due to the high solar zenith angle and the long duration of totality. Within the county, the longest duration occurred in Mohe Township (now Beiji Township), the northernmost township in China. Comet Hale–Bopp also appeared during totality, which also attracted many Chinese to travel to this northernmost town. In addition, the first amateur radio communication experiment during a total solar eclipse in mainland China, and China Central Television's first live broadcast of a solar eclipse were also completed there.

== Eclipse timing ==
=== Places experiencing total eclipse ===
Solar Eclipse of March 9, 1997 (Local Times)
Country or territory	City or place	Start of partial eclipse	Start of total eclipse	Maximum eclipse	End of total eclipse	End of partial eclipse	Duration of totality (min:s)	Duration of eclipse (hr:min)	Maximum magnitude
Mongolia	Khovd	07:19:25 (sunrise)	07:41:20	07:41:49	07:42:20	08:42:41	1:00	1:23	1.0026
Mongolia	Erdenet	07:47:51	08:47:12	08:48:20	08:49:28	09:53:35	2:16	2:06	1.0137
Mongolia	Darkhan	07:49:04	08:49:00	08:50:12	08:51:24	09:56:05	2:24	2:07	1.017
Russia	Chita	08:56:09	09:58:35	09:59:42	10:00:50	11:07:43	2:15	2:12	1.0105
China	Mohe	08:02:38	09:07:48	09:08:59	09:10:09	10:19:21	2:21	2:17	1.01
Russia	Neryungri	09:10:27	10:15:48	10:16:38	10:17:29	11:26:07	1:41	2:16	1.0047
Russia	Khandyga	09:27:35	10:33:37	10:34:07	10:34:37	11:42:19	1:00	2:15	1.0018
Russia	Oymyakon	11:34:07	12:40:03	12:41:18	12:42:33	13:49:27	2:30	2:15	1.0126
Russia	Ust-Nera	11:35:49	12:41:10	12:42:31	12:43:53	13:50:06	2:43	2:14	1.02
Russia	Belaya Gora	11:42:18	12:46:42	12:47:22	12:48:01	13:52:52	1:19	2:11	1.0031

=== Places experiencing partial eclipse ===
Solar Eclipse of March 9, 1997 (Local Times)
Country or territory	City or place	Start of partial eclipse	Maximum eclipse	End of partial eclipse	Duration of eclipse (hr:min)	Maximum coverage
Thailand	Bangkok	06:29:44 (sunrise)	06:57:06	07:37:54	1:08	16.04%
Myanmar	Yangon	06:18:04 (sunrise)	06:29:35	07:13:57	0:56	23.40%
Laos	Vientiane	06:22:40 (sunrise)	07:01:48	07:50:43	1:28	27.37%
Vietnam	Hanoi	06:16:48	07:06:25	08:00:47	1:44	35.97%
Philippines	Manila	07:23:30	08:08:31	08:57:28	1:34	16.37%
Macau	Macau	07:18:37	08:12:11	09:11:16	1:53	38.36%
Hong Kong	Hong Kong	07:18:54	08:12:48	09:12:16	1:53	38.53%
Bangladesh	Dhaka	06:13:24 (sunrise)	06:15:45	06:57:07	0:44	38.56%
Bhutan	Thimphu	06:17:49 (sunrise)	06:20:55	07:04:20	0:47	47.68%
Taiwan	Taipei	07:24:09	08:23:08	09:28:22	2:04	43.39%
India	Kolkata	05:51:13 (sunrise)	05:53:34	06:23:59	0:33	27.78%
China	Shanghai	07:29:17	08:32:32	09:42:20	2:13	59.51%
Nepal	Kathmandu	06:20:11 (sunrise)	06:22:46	06:48:16	0:28	27.20%
China	Beijing	07:37:25	08:41:35	09:51:49	2:14	82.43%
Mongolia	Ulaanbaatar	07:46:38	08:48:03	09:54:26	2:08	99.77%
South Korea	Seoul	08:41:25	09:49:11	11:03:00	2:22	71.26%
North Korea	Pyongyang	08:42:23	09:50:02	11:03:40	2:21	75.38%
Russia	Irkutsk	07:53:35	08:54:11	09:59:08	2:06	99.07%
Japan	Tokyo	08:54:14	10:04:52	11:20:00	2:26	55.19%
Russia	Magadan	11:37:02	12:46:37	13:56:31	2:19	91.72%
Russia	Srednekolymsk	11:46:38	12:52:34	13:58:28	2:12	99.82%
Russia	Anadyr	13:06:00	14:11:32	15:15:17	2:09	81.10%
United States	Point Hope (Note: The times listed for this location occur on March 8, 1997, local time.)	16:16:25	17:18:26	18:18:30	2:02	80.01%
United States	Point Lay	16:17:28	17:18:39	18:17:58	2:01	81.43%
United States	Wainwright	16:18:13	17:18:48	18:17:36	1:59	82.20%
United States	Utqiagvik	16:19:09	17:19:10	18:17:25	1:58	82.45%
United States	Atqasuk	16:19:45	17:19:57	18:18:17	1:59	80.88%
Canada	Inuvik	18:32:28	19:22:47	19:28:45 (sunset)	0:56	66.82%
United States	Fairbanks	16:32:23	17:30:07	18:25:29	1:53	63.39%
United States	Anchorage	16:36:42	17:33:45	18:28:10	1:51	54.27%

== Eclipse details ==
Shown below are two tables displaying details about this particular solar eclipse. The first table outlines times at which the Moon's penumbra or umbra attains the specific parameter, and the second table describes various other parameters pertaining to this eclipse.

March 9, 1997 Solar Eclipse Times
Event	Time (UTC)
First Penumbral External Contact	1997 March 8 at 23:17:38.3 UTC
First Umbral External Contact	1997 March 9 at 00:42:04.9 UTC
First Central Line	1997 March 9 at 00:44:28.2 UTC
First Umbral Internal Contact	1997 March 9 at 00:46:59.1 UTC
Ecliptic Conjunction	1997 March 9 at 01:15:36.8 UTC
Greatest Duration	1997 March 9 at 01:24:17.2 UTC
Greatest Eclipse	1997 March 9 at 01:24:50.6 UTC
Equatorial Conjunction	1997 March 9 at 01:54:40.0 UTC
Last Umbral Internal Contact	1997 March 9 at 02:02:20.9 UTC
Last Central Line	1997 March 9 at 02:04:51.3 UTC
Last Umbral External Contact	1997 March 9 at 02:07:14.0 UTC
Last Penumbral External Contact	1997 March 9 at 03:31:50.3 UTC

March 9, 1997 Solar Eclipse Parameters
Parameter	Value
Eclipse Magnitude	1.04202
Eclipse Obscuration	1.08580
Gamma	0.91830
Sun Right Ascension	23h17m46.1s
Sun Declination	-04°32'29.2"
Sun Semi-Diameter	16'06.5"
Sun Equatorial Horizontal Parallax	08.9"
Moon Right Ascension	23h16m38.7s
Moon Declination	-03°38'59.4"
Moon Semi-Diameter	16'40.8"
Moon Equatorial Horizontal Parallax	1°01'12.9"
ΔT	62.4 s

== Eclipse season ==
This eclipse is part of an eclipse season, a period, roughly every six months, when eclipses occur. Only two (or occasionally three) eclipse seasons occur each year, and each season lasts about 35 days and repeats just short of six months (173 days) later; thus two full eclipse seasons always occur each year. Either two or three eclipses happen each eclipse season. In the sequence below, each eclipse is separated by a fortnight.

Eclipse season of March 1997
March 9 Descending node (new moon)	March 24 Ascending node (full moon)
Total solar eclipse Solar Saros 120	Partial lunar eclipse Lunar Saros 132

== Related eclipses ==
=== Eclipses in 1997 ===
- A total solar eclipse on March 9.
- A partial lunar eclipse on March 24.
- A partial solar eclipse on September 2.
- A total lunar eclipse on September 16.

=== Metonic ===
- Preceded by: Solar eclipse of May 21, 1993
- Followed by: Solar eclipse of December 25, 2000

=== Tzolkinex ===
- Preceded by: Solar eclipse of January 26, 1990
- Followed by: Solar eclipse of April 19, 2004

=== Half-Saros ===
- Preceded by: Lunar eclipse of March 3, 1988
- Followed by: Lunar eclipse of March 14, 2006

=== Tritos ===
- Preceded by: Solar eclipse of April 9, 1986
- Followed by: Solar eclipse of February 7, 2008

=== Solar Saros 120 ===
- Preceded by: Solar eclipse of February 26, 1979
- Followed by: Solar eclipse of March 20, 2015

=== Inex ===
- Preceded by: Solar eclipse of March 28, 1968
- Followed by: Solar eclipse of February 17, 2026

=== Triad ===
- Preceded by: Solar eclipse of May 9, 1910
- Followed by: Solar eclipse of January 7, 2084

=== Solar eclipses of 1997–2000 ===
This eclipse is a member of a semester series. An eclipse in a semester series of solar eclipses repeats approximately every 177 days and 4 hours (a semester) at alternating nodes of the Moon's orbit.

The partial solar eclipses on July 1, 2000 and December 25, 2000 occur in the next lunar year eclipse set.

Solar eclipse series sets from 1997 to 2000
Descending node			Ascending node		
Saros	Map	Gamma	Saros	Map	Gamma
120 Totality in Chita, Russia	March 9, 1997 Total	0.9183	125	September 2, 1997 Partial	−1.0352
130 Totality near Guadeloupe	February 26, 1998 Total	0.2391	135	August 22, 1998 Annular	−0.2644
140	February 16, 1999 Annular	−0.4726	145 Totality in France	August 11, 1999 Total	0.5062
150	February 5, 2000 Partial	−1.2233	155	July 31, 2000 Partial	1.2166

=== Saros 120 ===
This eclipse is a part of Saros series 120, repeating every 18 years, 11 days, and containing 71 events. The series started with a partial solar eclipse on May 27, 933 AD. It contains annular eclipses from August 11, 1059 through April 26, 1492; hybrid eclipses from May 8, 1510 through June 8, 1564; and total eclipses from June 20, 1582 through March 30, 2033. The series ends at member 71 as a partial eclipse on July 7, 2195. Its eclipses are tabulated in three columns; every third eclipse in the same column is one exeligmos apart, so they all cast shadows over approximately the same parts of the Earth.

The longest duration of annularity was produced by member 11 at 6 minutes, 24 seconds on September 11, 1113, and the longest duration of totality was produced by member 60 at 2 minutes, 50 seconds on March 9, 1997. All eclipses in this series occur at the Moon’s descending node of orbit.

Series members 50–71 occur between 1801 and 2195:
50	51	52
November 19, 1816	November 30, 1834	December 11, 1852
53	54	55
December 22, 1870	January 1, 1889	January 14, 1907
56	57	58
January 24, 1925	February 4, 1943	February 15, 1961
59	60	61
February 26, 1979	March 9, 1997	March 20, 2015
62	63	64
March 30, 2033	April 11, 2051	April 21, 2069
65	66	67
May 2, 2087	May 14, 2105	May 25, 2123
68	69	70
June 4, 2141	June 16, 2159	June 26, 2177
71
July 7, 2195

=== Metonic series ===
The metonic series repeats eclipses every 19 years (6939.69 days), lasting about 5 cycles. Eclipses occur in nearly the same calendar date. In addition, the octon subseries repeats 1/5 of that or every 3.8 years (1387.94 days). All eclipses in this table occur at the Moon's descending node.

21 eclipse events between May 21, 1993 and May 20, 2069
May 20–21	March 9	December 25–26	October 13–14	August 1–2
118	120	122	124	126
May 21, 1993	March 9, 1997	December 25, 2000	October 14, 2004	August 1, 2008
128	130	132	134	136
May 20, 2012	March 9, 2016	December 26, 2019	October 14, 2023	August 2, 2027
138	140	142	144	146
May 21, 2031	March 9, 2035	December 26, 2038	October 14, 2042	August 2, 2046
148	150	152	154	156
May 20, 2050	March 9, 2054	December 26, 2057	October 13, 2061	August 2, 2065
158
May 20, 2069

=== Tritos series ===
This eclipse is a part of a tritos cycle, repeating at alternating nodes every 135 synodic months (≈ 3986.63 days, or 11 years minus 1 month). Their appearance and longitude are irregular due to a lack of synchronization with the anomalistic month (period of perigee), but groupings of 3 tritos cycles (≈ 33 years minus 3 months) come close (≈ 434.044 anomalistic months), so eclipses are similar in these groupings.

Series members between 1866 and 2200
March 16, 1866 (Saros 108)			December 13, 1898 (Saros 111)	
	September 12, 1931 (Saros 114)	August 12, 1942 (Saros 115)	July 11, 1953 (Saros 116)	June 10, 1964 (Saros 117)
May 11, 1975 (Saros 118)	April 9, 1986 (Saros 119)	March 9, 1997 (Saros 120)	February 7, 2008 (Saros 121)	January 6, 2019 (Saros 122)
December 5, 2029 (Saros 123)	November 4, 2040 (Saros 124)	October 4, 2051 (Saros 125)	September 3, 2062 (Saros 126)	August 3, 2073 (Saros 127)
July 3, 2084 (Saros 128)	June 2, 2095 (Saros 129)	May 3, 2106 (Saros 130)	April 2, 2117 (Saros 131)	March 1, 2128 (Saros 132)
January 30, 2139 (Saros 133)	December 30, 2149 (Saros 134)	November 27, 2160 (Saros 135)	October 29, 2171 (Saros 136)	September 27, 2182 (Saros 137)
August 26, 2193 (Saros 138)

=== Inex series ===
This eclipse is a part of the long period inex cycle, repeating at alternating nodes, every 358 synodic months (≈ 10,571.95 days, or 29 years minus 20 days). Their appearance and longitude are irregular due to a lack of synchronization with the anomalistic month (period of perigee). However, groupings of 3 inex cycles (≈ 87 years minus 2 months) comes close (≈ 1,151.02 anomalistic months), so eclipses are similar in these groupings.

Series members between 1801 and 2200
July 8, 1823 (Saros 114)	June 17, 1852 (Saros 115)	May 27, 1881 (Saros 116)
May 9, 1910 (Saros 117)	April 19, 1939 (Saros 118)	March 28, 1968 (Saros 119)
March 9, 1997 (Saros 120)	February 17, 2026 (Saros 121)	January 27, 2055 (Saros 122)
January 7, 2084 (Saros 123)	December 19, 2112 (Saros 124)	November 28, 2141 (Saros 125)
November 8, 2170 (Saros 126)	October 19, 2199 (Saros 127)	

== See also ==
- Comet Hale-Bopp
