= Solar eclipse of November 23, 2003 =

Total eclipse

- Total eclipse
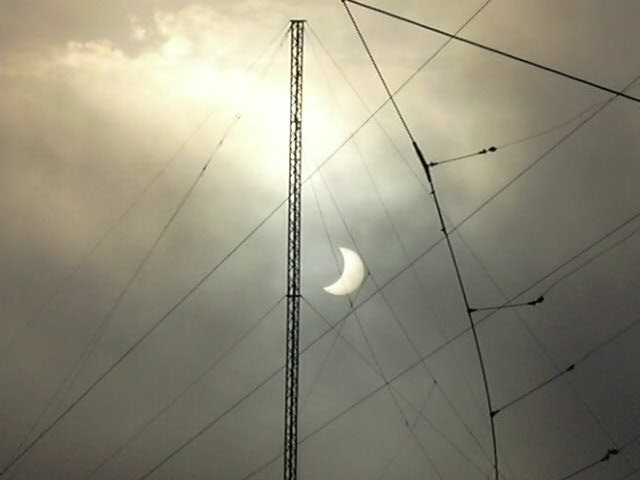

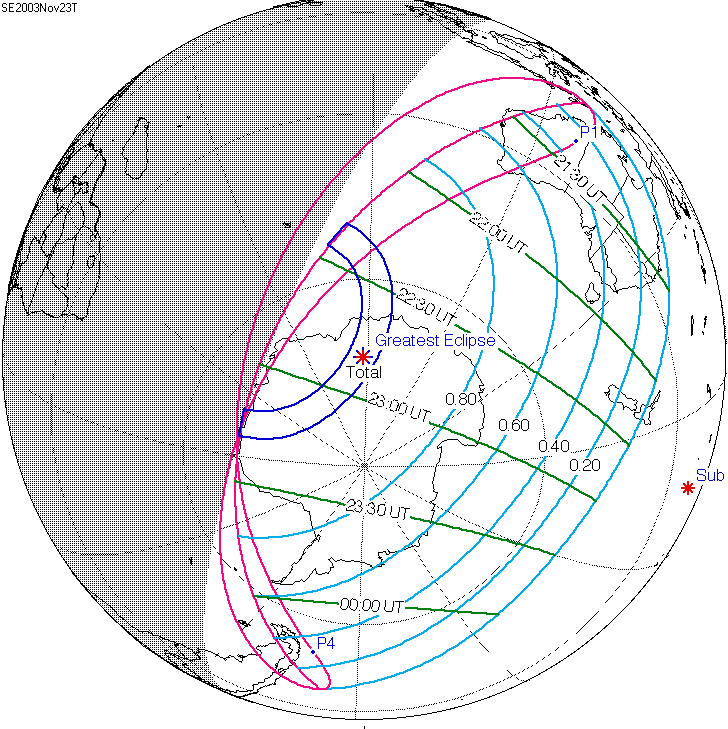
- Map
- Gamma: −0.9638
- Magnitude: 1.0379

Maximum eclipse
- Duration: 117 s (1 min 57 s)
- Coordinates: 72.7°S 88.4°E
- Max. width of band: 495 km (308 mi)

Times (UTC)
- Greatest eclipse: 22:50:22

References
- Saros: 152 (12 of 70)
- Catalog # (SE5000): 9516

A total solar eclipse occurred at the Moon's descending node of orbit between Sunday, November 23 and Monday, November 24, 2003, with a magnitude of 1.0379. A solar eclipse occurs when the Moon passes between Earth and the Sun, thereby totally or partly obscuring the image of the Sun for a viewer on Earth. A total solar eclipse occurs when the Moon's apparent diameter is larger than the Sun's, blocking all direct sunlight, turning day into darkness. Totality occurs in a narrow path across Earth's surface, with the partial solar eclipse visible over a surrounding region thousands of kilometres wide. Occurring about 25 minutes before perigee (on November 23, 2003, at 23:15 UTC), the Moon's apparent diameter was near its maximum. Perigee did occur just past the greatest point of this eclipse.

For most solar eclipses the path of totality moves eastwards. In this case the path moved south and then west round Antarctica.

Totality was visible from a corridor in eastern Antarctica. A partial eclipse was visible for parts of Australia, New Zealand, Antarctica, southern Chile, and southern Argentina.

== Observations ==
A Russian icebreaker departed from Port Elizabeth, South Africa carrying tourists to observe the eclipse near the Shackleton Ice Shelf and Novolazarevskaya Station, and then sailed to Hobart, Tasmania. About 100 people from 15 countries were on board, including Iranian amateur astronomer Babak Amin Tafreshi, NASA's Goddard Space Flight Center astrophysicist Fred Espenak, and Williams College professor Jay Pasachoff. There were also about 200 scientists and tourists taking two commercial charter flights to observe it over Antarctica. This was the first time humans observed a total solar eclipse from Antarctica.

== Images ==
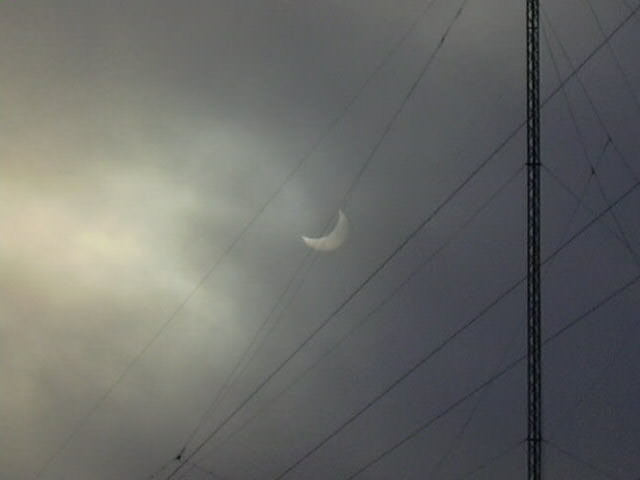
A photo of the eclipse.

== Eclipse timing ==
=== Places experiencing partial eclipse ===
Solar Eclipse of November 23, 2003 (Local Times)
Country or territory	City or place	Start of partial eclipse	Maximum eclipse	End of partial eclipse	Duration of eclipse (hr:min)	Maximum coverage
Timor-Leste	Baucau (Note: The times listed for this location occur on November 24, 2003, local time.)	06:04:18 (sunrise)	06:09:36	06:19:38	0:15	0.34%
Timor-Leste	Dili	06:07:39 (sunrise)	06:10:06	06:22:28	0:15	0.65%
Timor-Leste	Same	06:06:41 (sunrise)	06:10:27	06:24:49	0:18	1.01%
Timor-Leste	Suai	06:07:47 (sunrise)	06:10:54	06:27:06	0:19	1.47%
Australia	Darwin	06:22:24	06:41:35	07:01:21	0:39	2.40%
Indonesia	Kupang	05:13:09 (sunrise)	05:15:29	05:33:15	0:20	3.11%
Australia	Tennant Creek	06:17:22	06:48:48	07:21:50	1:04	10.54%
Australia	Alice Springs	06:17:07	06:54:06	07:33:18	1:16	17.97%
Australia	Brisbane	07:04:13	07:31:46	08:00:38	0:56	4.34%
Australia	Eucla	05:36:12	06:21:06	07:09:04	1:33	38.56%
Australia	Perth	05:05:01 (sunrise)	05:39:55	06:27:57	1:23	52.53%
Australia	Adelaide	07:25:03	08:10:58	09:00:12	1:35	32.88%
Australia	Lord Howe Island	08:14:38	08:42:09	09:10:55	0:56	3.66%
Australia	Sydney	08:02:03	08:42:18	09:25:12	1:23	15.27%
Australia	Canberra	08:01:01	08:44:03	09:30:02	1:29	20.11%
Australia	Melbourne	08:00:28	08:47:13	09:37:21	1:37	29.69%
Australia	Hobart	08:07:31	08:57:23	09:50:49	1:43	35.02%
New Zealand	Wellington	10:52:39	11:16:44	11:41:31	0:49	1.65%
New Zealand	Christchurch	10:43:07	11:18:26	11:55:14	1:12	5.93%
New Zealand	Oban	10:34:18	11:19:55	12:07:56	1:34	15.70%
New Zealand	Dunedin	10:38:09	11:20:29	12:04:53	1:27	11.48%
New Zealand	Chatham Islands	12:13:12	12:19:47	12:26:24	0:13	0.03%
Antarctica	Casey Station	05:42:06	06:35:24	07:30:48	1:49	95.21%
Antarctica	Davis Station	04:55:32	05:45:41	06:37:08	1:42	98.53%
Falkland Islands	Stanley	20:25:52	20:32:34	20:36:51 (sunset)	0:11	4.46%
Antarctica	Orcadas Base	20:05:46	20:33:40	20:41:50 (sunset)	0:36	40.80%
Antarctica	Marambio Base	20:05:55	20:54:05	21:40:51	1:35	59.27%
Antarctica	Carlini Base	20:09:46	20:57:06	21:42:58	1:33	54.58%
Argentina	Ushuaia	20:26:25	21:09:00	21:34:28 (sunset)	1:08	33.51%
Chile	Punta Arenas	20:30:51	21:11:45	21:36:10 (sunset)	1:05	28.23%

== Eclipse details ==
Shown below are two tables displaying details about this particular solar eclipse. The first table outlines times at which the Moon's penumbra or umbra attains the specific parameter, and the second table describes various other parameters pertaining to this eclipse.

November 23, 2003 Solar Eclipse Times
Event	Time (UTC)
First Penumbral External Contact	2003 November 23 at 20:47:10.0 UTC
First Umbral External Contact	2003 November 23 at 22:20:25.7 UTC
First Central Line	2003 November 23 at 22:23:45.1 UTC
First Umbral Internal Contact	2003 November 23 at 22:27:31.3 UTC
Greatest Duration	2003 November 23 at 22:50:18.7 UTC
Greatest Eclipse	2003 November 23 at 22:50:21.7 UTC
Ecliptic Conjunction	2003 November 23 at 23:00:01.3 UTC
Equatorial Conjunction	2003 November 23 at 23:21:19.7 UTC
Last Umbral Internal Contact	2003 November 23 at 23:12:52.0 UTC
Last Central Line	2003 November 23 at 23:16:38.4 UTC
Last Umbral External Contact	2003 November 23 at 23:19:57.9 UTC
Last Penumbral External Contact	2003 November 24 at 00:53:20.5 UTC

November 23, 2003 Solar Eclipse Parameters
Parameter	Value
Eclipse Magnitude	1.03789
Eclipse Obscuration	1.07721
Gamma	−0.96381
Sun Right Ascension	15h56m23.2s
Sun Declination	-20°24'22.8"
Sun Semi-Diameter	16'11.8"
Sun Equatorial Horizontal Parallax	08.9"
Moon Right Ascension	15h55m07.5s
Moon Declination	-21°20'45.7"
Moon Semi-Diameter	16'44.7"
Moon Equatorial Horizontal Parallax	1°01'27.3"
ΔT	64.5 s

== Eclipse season ==
This eclipse is part of an eclipse season, a period, roughly every six months, when eclipses occur. Only two (or occasionally three) eclipse seasons occur each year, and each season lasts about 35 days and repeats just short of six months (173 days) later; thus two full eclipse seasons always occur each year. Either two or three eclipses happen each eclipse season. In the sequence below, each eclipse is separated by a fortnight.

Eclipse season of November 2003
November 9 Ascending node (full moon)	November 23 Descending node (new moon)
Total lunar eclipse Lunar Saros 126	Total solar eclipse Solar Saros 152

== Related eclipses ==
=== Eclipses in 2003 ===
- A total lunar eclipse on May 16.
- An annular solar eclipse on May 31.
- A total lunar eclipse on November 9.
- A total solar eclipse on November 23.

=== Metonic ===
- Preceded by: Solar eclipse of February 5, 2000
- Followed by: Solar eclipse of September 11, 2007

=== Tzolkinex ===
- Preceded by: Solar eclipse of October 12, 1996
- Followed by: Solar eclipse of January 4, 2011

=== Half-Saros ===
- Preceded by: Lunar eclipse of November 18, 1994
- Followed by: Lunar eclipse of November 28, 2012

=== Tritos ===
- Preceded by: Solar eclipse of December 24, 1992
- Followed by: Solar eclipse of October 23, 2014

=== Solar Saros 152 ===
- Preceded by: Solar eclipse of November 12, 1985
- Followed by: Solar eclipse of December 4, 2021

=== Inex ===
- Preceded by: Solar eclipse of December 13, 1974
- Followed by: Solar eclipse of November 3, 2032

=== Triad ===
- Preceded by: Solar eclipse of January 23, 1917
- Followed by: Solar eclipse of September 23, 2090

=== Solar eclipses of 2000–2003 ===
This eclipse is a member of a semester series. An eclipse in a semester series of solar eclipses repeats approximately every 177 days and 4 hours (a semester) at alternating nodes of the Moon's orbit.

The partial solar eclipses on February 5, 2000 and July 31, 2000 occur in the previous lunar year eclipse set.

Solar eclipse series sets from 2000 to 2003
Ascending node			Descending node		
Saros	Map	Gamma	Saros	Map	Gamma
117	July 1, 2000 Partial	−1.28214	122 Partial projection in Minneapolis, MN, USA	December 25, 2000 Partial	1.13669
127 Totality in Lusaka, Zambia	June 21, 2001 Total	−0.57013	132 Partial in Minneapolis, MN, USA	December 14, 2001 Annular	0.40885
137 Partial in Los Angeles, CA, USA	June 10, 2002 Annular	0.19933	142 Totality in Woomera, South Australia	December 4, 2002 Total	−0.30204
147 Annularity in Culloden, Scotland	May 31, 2003 Annular	0.99598	152	November 23, 2003 Total	−0.96381

=== Saros 152 ===
This eclipse is a part of Saros series 152, repeating every 18 years, 11 days, and containing 70 events. The series started with a partial solar eclipse on July 26, 1805. It contains total eclipses from November 2, 1967 through September 14, 2490; hybrid eclipses from September 26, 2508 through October 17, 2544; and annular eclipses from October 29, 2562 through June 16, 2941. The series ends at member 70 as a partial eclipse on August 20, 3049. Its eclipses are tabulated in three columns; every third eclipse in the same column is one exeligmos apart, so they all cast shadows over approximately the same parts of the Earth.

The longest duration of totality will be produced by member 30 at 5 minutes, 16 seconds on June 9, 2328, and the longest duration of annularity will be produced by member 53 at 5 minutes, 20 seconds on February 16, 2743. All eclipses in this series occur at the Moon’s descending node of orbit.

Series members 1–22 occur between 1805 and 2200:
1	2	3
July 26, 1805	August 6, 1823	August 16, 1841
4	5	6
August 28, 1859	September 7, 1877	September 18, 1895
7	8	9
September 30, 1913	October 11, 1931	October 21, 1949
10	11	12
November 2, 1967	November 12, 1985	November 23, 2003
13	14	15
December 4, 2021	December 15, 2039	December 26, 2057
16	17	18
January 6, 2076	January 16, 2094	January 29, 2112
19	20	21
February 8, 2130	February 19, 2148	March 2, 2166
22
March 12, 2184

=== Metonic series ===
The metonic series repeats eclipses every 19 years (6939.69 days), lasting about 5 cycles. Eclipses occur in nearly the same calendar date. In addition, the octon subseries repeats 1/5 of that or every 3.8 years (1387.94 days). All eclipses in this table occur at the Moon's descending node.

22 eclipse events between September 12, 1931 and July 1, 2011
September 11–12	June 30–July 1	April 17–19	February 4–5	November 22–23
114	116	118	120	122
September 12, 1931	June 30, 1935	April 19, 1939	February 4, 1943	November 23, 1946
124	126	128	130	132
September 12, 1950	June 30, 1954	April 19, 1958	February 5, 1962	November 23, 1965
134	136	138	140	142
September 11, 1969	June 30, 1973	April 18, 1977	February 4, 1981	November 22, 1984
144	146	148	150	152
September 11, 1988	June 30, 1992	April 17, 1996	February 5, 2000	November 23, 2003
154	156			
September 11, 2007	July 1, 2011			

=== Tritos series ===
This eclipse is a part of a tritos cycle, repeating at alternating nodes every 135 synodic months (≈ 3986.63 days, or 11 years minus 1 month). Their appearance and longitude are irregular due to a lack of synchronization with the anomalistic month (period of perigee), but groupings of 3 tritos cycles (≈ 33 years minus 3 months) come close (≈ 434.044 anomalistic months), so eclipses are similar in these groupings.

The partial solar eclipses on November 16, 2134 (part of Saros 164) and October 16, 2145 (part of Saros 165) are also a part of this series but are not included in the table below.

Series members between 1801 and 2069
June 6, 1807 (Saros 134)	May 5, 1818 (Saros 135)	April 3, 1829 (Saros 136)	March 4, 1840 (Saros 137)	February 1, 1851 (Saros 138)
December 31, 1861 (Saros 139)	November 30, 1872 (Saros 140)	October 30, 1883 (Saros 141)	September 29, 1894 (Saros 142)	August 30, 1905 (Saros 143)
July 30, 1916 (Saros 144)	June 29, 1927 (Saros 145)	May 29, 1938 (Saros 146)	April 28, 1949 (Saros 147)	March 27, 1960 (Saros 148)
February 25, 1971 (Saros 149)	January 25, 1982 (Saros 150)	December 24, 1992 (Saros 151)	November 23, 2003 (Saros 152)	October 23, 2014 (Saros 153)
September 21, 2025 (Saros 154)	August 21, 2036 (Saros 155)	July 22, 2047 (Saros 156)	June 21, 2058 (Saros 157)	May 20, 2069 (Saros 158)

=== Inex series ===
This eclipse is a part of the long period inex cycle, repeating at alternating nodes, every 358 synodic months (≈ 10,571.95 days, or 29 years minus 20 days). Their appearance and longitude are irregular due to a lack of synchronization with the anomalistic month (period of perigee). However, groupings of 3 inex cycles (≈ 87 years minus 2 months) comes close (≈ 1,151.02 anomalistic months), so eclipses are similar in these groupings.

Series members between 1801 and 2200
April 13, 1801 (Saros 145)	March 24, 1830 (Saros 146)	March 4, 1859 (Saros 147)
February 11, 1888 (Saros 148)	January 23, 1917 (Saros 149)	January 3, 1946 (Saros 150)
December 13, 1974 (Saros 151)	November 23, 2003 (Saros 152)	November 3, 2032 (Saros 153)
October 13, 2061 (Saros 154)	September 23, 2090 (Saros 155)	September 5, 2119 (Saros 156)
August 14, 2148 (Saros 157)	July 25, 2177 (Saros 158)	
