= Solar eclipse of December 25, 2000 =

20th-century partial solar eclipse

- Partial eclipse
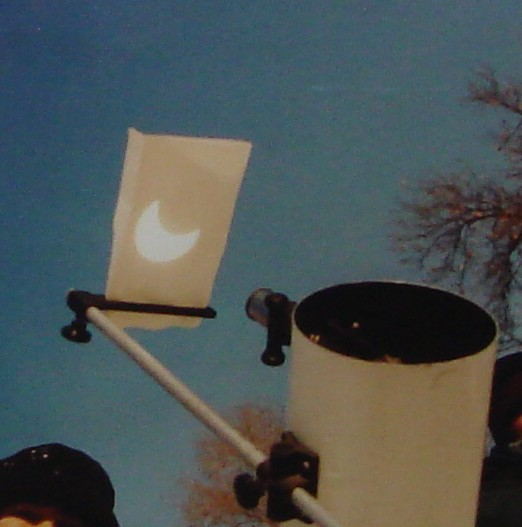
- Projected partial eclipse from Minneapolis, Minnesota

- Map
- Gamma: 1.1367
- Magnitude: 0.7228

Maximum eclipse
- Coordinates: 66.3°N 74.1°W

Times (UTC)
- Greatest eclipse: 17:35:57

References
- Saros: 122 (57 of 70)
- Catalog # (SE5000): 9510

A partial solar eclipse occurred at the Moon's descending node of orbit on Monday, December 25, 2000 (also known as the "Christmas 2000 Solar Eclipse"), with a magnitude of 0.7228. It was the first solar eclipse to fall on Christmas since 1954, and will be the last until 2038. A solar eclipse occurs when the Moon passes between Earth and the Sun, thereby totally or partly obscuring the image of the Sun for a viewer on Earth. A partial solar eclipse occurs in the polar regions of the Earth when the center of the Moon's shadow misses the Earth. This was also the last solar eclipse of the 20th century.

This was the first solar eclipse on Christmas Day since the annular solar eclipse of 1954.

This was the last of four partial solar eclipses in 2000, with the others occurring on February 5, July 1, and July 31.

A partial eclipse was visible for parts of North America and the Caribbean.

== Images ==
Animated path

== Eclipse timing ==
=== Places experiencing partial eclipse ===
Solar Eclipse of December 25, 2000 (Local Times)
Country or territory	City or place	Start of partial eclipse	Maximum eclipse	End of partial eclipse	Duration of eclipse (hr:min)	Maximum coverage
United States	San Francisco	07:33:09	08:20:50	09:12:55	1:40	9.03%
United States	Los Angeles	07:37:05	08:22:50	09:12:45	1:36	6.81%
Mexico	Mexico City	10:16:33	10:53:46	11:33:08	1:17	1.65%
United States	New Orleans	09:48:22	11:12:13	12:41:28	2:53	23.16%
Guatemala	Guatemala City	10:45:38	11:16:17	11:47:41	1:02	0.70%
United States	Chicago	09:44:55	11:17:09	12:53:23	3:08	43.29%
Belize	Belmopan	10:26:10	11:19:27	12:14:37	1:48	3.97%
El Salvador	San Salvador	10:54:42	11:20:04	11:45:52	0:51	0.38%
Greenland	Nuuk	13:36:58	14:20:39	14:31:37 (sunset)	0:55	32.86%
Honduras	Tegucigalpa	10:48:58	11:24:53	12:01:26	1:12	1.09%
United States	Detroit	10:51:56	12:26:57	14:03:19	3:11	45.68%
Cuba	Havana	11:13:14	12:33:43	13:54:35	2:41	15.10%
Canada	Toronto	10:58:17	12:34:30	14:09:54	3:12	48.17%
Cayman Islands	George Town	11:27:16	12:37:47	13:47:58	2:21	9.07%
United States	Washington, D.C.	11:03:53	12:41:19	14:16:09	3:12	41.93%
Greenland	Paamiut	13:41:13	14:44:38	14:54:27 (sunset)	1:13	49.47%
Canada	Montreal	11:09:11	12:45:39	14:18:20	3:09	50.57%
Bahamas	Nassau	11:19:36	12:46:09	14:09:48	2:50	19.10%
United States	New York City	11:09:35	12:47:14	14:20:37	3:11	44.43%
Jamaica	Kingston	11:43:04	12:50:09	13:54:59	2:12	7.44%
Turks and Caicos Islands	Providenciales	11:42:15	13:00:21	14:13:21	2:31	12.88%
Haiti	Port-au-Prince	11:53:46	13:01:12	14:04:43	2:11	7.74%
Turks and Caicos Islands	Cockburn Harbour	11:45:23	13:02:13	14:13:48	2:28	12.23%
Turks and Caicos Islands	Cockburn Town	11:46:44	13:03:12	14:14:17	2:28	12.07%
Dominican Republic	Santo Domingo	13:02:13	14:07:06	15:07:33	2:05	7.02%
Bermuda	Hamilton	12:41:35	14:12:24	15:34:01	2:52	28.23%
Saint Pierre and Miquelon	Saint-Pierre	13:45:18	15:14:36	16:35:23	2:50	45.85%
Puerto Rico	San Juan	13:16:23	14:15:57	15:10:53	1:55	5.72%
Canada	St. John's	13:21:38	14:48:23	16:06:35	2:45	44.77%
Portugal	Ponta Delgada	17:06:42	17:21:16	17:29:45 (sunset)	0:23	3.14%

== Eclipse details ==
Shown below are two tables displaying details about this particular solar eclipse. The first table outlines times at which the Moon's penumbra or umbra attains the specific parameter, and the second table describes various other parameters pertaining to this eclipse.

December 25, 2000 Solar Eclipse Times
Event	Time (UTC)
First Penumbral External Contact	2000 December 25 at 15:27:44.5 UTC
Ecliptic Conjunction	2000 December 25 at 17:22:41.2 UTC
Equatorial Conjunction	2000 December 25 at 17:27:01.0 UTC
Greatest Eclipse	2000 December 25 at 17:35:56.9 UTC
Last Penumbral External Contact	2000 December 25 at 19:44:16.3 UTC

December 25, 2000 Solar Eclipse Parameters
Parameter	Value
Eclipse Magnitude	0.72279
Eclipse Obscuration	0.62922
Gamma	1.13669
Sun Right Ascension	18h18m29.8s
Sun Declination	-23°22'12.5"
Sun Semi-Diameter	16'15.7"
Sun Equatorial Horizontal Parallax	08.9"
Moon Right Ascension	18h18m47.5s
Moon Declination	-22°20'41.9"
Moon Semi-Diameter	14'49.1"
Moon Equatorial Horizontal Parallax	0°54'22.8"
ΔT	64.1 s

== Eclipse season ==
This eclipse is part of an eclipse season, a period, roughly every six months, when eclipses occur. Only two (or occasionally three) eclipse seasons occur each year, and each season lasts about 35 days and repeats just short of six months (173 days) later; thus two full eclipse seasons always occur each year. Either two or three eclipses happen each eclipse season. In the sequence below, each eclipse is separated by a fortnight.

Eclipse season of December 2000–January 2001
December 25 Descending node (new moon)	January 9 Ascending node (full moon)
Partial solar eclipse Solar Saros 122	Total lunar eclipse Lunar Saros 134

== Related eclipses ==
=== Eclipses in 2000 ===
- A total lunar eclipse on January 21.
- A partial solar eclipse on February 5.
- A partial solar eclipse on July 1.
- A total lunar eclipse on July 16.
- A partial solar eclipse on July 31.
- A partial solar eclipse on December 25.

=== Metonic ===
- Preceded by: Solar eclipse of March 9, 1997
- Followed by: Solar eclipse of October 14, 2004

=== Tzolkinex ===
- Preceded by: Solar eclipse of November 13, 1993
- Followed by: Solar eclipse of February 7, 2008

=== Half-Saros ===
- Preceded by: Lunar eclipse of December 21, 1991
- Followed by: Lunar eclipse of December 31, 2009

=== Tritos ===
- Preceded by: Solar eclipse of January 26, 1990
- Followed by: Solar eclipse of November 25, 2011

=== Solar Saros 122 ===
- Preceded by: Solar eclipse of December 15, 1982
- Followed by: Solar eclipse of January 6, 2019

=== Inex ===
- Preceded by: Solar eclipse of January 16, 1972
- Followed by: Solar eclipse of December 5, 2029

=== Triad ===
- Preceded by: Solar eclipse of February 25, 1914
- Followed by: Solar eclipse of October 26, 2087

=== Solar eclipses of 2000–2003 ===
This eclipse is a member of a semester series. An eclipse in a semester series of solar eclipses repeats approximately every 177 days and 4 hours (a semester) at alternating nodes of the Moon's orbit.

The partial solar eclipses on February 5, 2000 and July 31, 2000 occur in the previous lunar year eclipse set.

Solar eclipse series sets from 2000 to 2003
Ascending node			Descending node		
Saros	Map	Gamma	Saros	Map	Gamma
117	July 1, 2000 Partial	−1.28214	122 Partial projection in Minneapolis, MN, USA	December 25, 2000 Partial	1.13669
127 Totality in Lusaka, Zambia	June 21, 2001 Total	−0.57013	132 Partial in Minneapolis, MN, USA	December 14, 2001 Annular	0.40885
137 Partial in Los Angeles, CA, USA	June 10, 2002 Annular	0.19933	142 Totality in Woomera, South Australia	December 4, 2002 Total	−0.30204
147 Annularity in Culloden, Scotland	May 31, 2003 Annular	0.99598	152	November 23, 2003 Total	−0.96381

=== Saros 122 ===
This eclipse is a part of Saros series 122, repeating every 18 years, 11 days, and containing 70 events. The series started with a partial solar eclipse on April 17, 991 AD. It contains total eclipses from July 12, 1135 through August 3, 1171; hybrid eclipses on August 13, 1189 and August 25, 1207; and annular eclipses from September 4, 1225 through October 10, 1874. The series ends at member 70 as a partial eclipse on May 17, 2235. Its eclipses are tabulated in three columns; every third eclipse in the same column is one exeligmos apart, so they all cast shadows over approximately the same parts of the Earth.

The longest duration of totality was produced by member 9 at 1 minutes, 25 seconds on July 12, 1135, and the longest duration of annularity was produced by member 50 at 6 minutes, 28 seconds on October 10, 1874. All eclipses in this series occur at the Moon’s descending node of orbit.

Series members 46–68 occur between 1801 and 2200:
46	47	48
August 28, 1802	September 7, 1820	September 18, 1838
49	50	51
September 29, 1856	October 10, 1874	October 20, 1892
52	53	54
November 2, 1910	November 12, 1928	November 23, 1946
55	56	57
December 4, 1964	December 15, 1982	December 25, 2000
58	59	60
January 6, 2019	January 16, 2037	January 27, 2055
61	62	63
February 7, 2073	February 18, 2091	March 1, 2109
64	65	66
March 13, 2127	March 23, 2145	April 3, 2163
67	68	
April 14, 2181	April 25, 2199	

=== Metonic series ===
The metonic series repeats eclipses every 19 years (6939.69 days), lasting about 5 cycles. Eclipses occur in nearly the same calendar date. In addition, the octon subseries repeats 1/5 of that or every 3.8 years (1387.94 days). All eclipses in this table occur at the Moon's descending node.

21 eclipse events between May 21, 1993 and May 20, 2069
May 20–21	March 9	December 25–26	October 13–14	August 1–2
118	120	122	124	126
May 21, 1993	March 9, 1997	December 25, 2000	October 14, 2004	August 1, 2008
128	130	132	134	136
May 20, 2012	March 9, 2016	December 26, 2019	October 14, 2023	August 2, 2027
138	140	142	144	146
May 21, 2031	March 9, 2035	December 26, 2038	October 14, 2042	August 2, 2046
148	150	152	154	156
May 20, 2050	March 9, 2054	December 26, 2057	October 13, 2061	August 2, 2065
158
May 20, 2069

=== Tritos series ===
This eclipse is a part of a tritos cycle, repeating at alternating nodes every 135 synodic months (≈ 3986.63 days, or 11 years minus 1 month). Their appearance and longitude are irregular due to a lack of synchronization with the anomalistic month (period of perigee), but groupings of 3 tritos cycles (≈ 33 years minus 3 months) come close (≈ 434.044 anomalistic months), so eclipses are similar in these groupings.

Series members between 1837 and 2200
April 5, 1837 (Saros 107)	March 5, 1848 (Saros 108)	February 3, 1859 (Saros 109)		December 2, 1880 (Saros 111)
		August 31, 1913 (Saros 114)	July 31, 1924 (Saros 115)	June 30, 1935 (Saros 116)
May 30, 1946 (Saros 117)	April 30, 1957 (Saros 118)	March 28, 1968 (Saros 119)	February 26, 1979 (Saros 120)	January 26, 1990 (Saros 121)
December 25, 2000 (Saros 122)	November 25, 2011 (Saros 123)	October 25, 2022 (Saros 124)	September 23, 2033 (Saros 125)	August 23, 2044 (Saros 126)
July 24, 2055 (Saros 127)	June 22, 2066 (Saros 128)	May 22, 2077 (Saros 129)	April 21, 2088 (Saros 130)	March 21, 2099 (Saros 131)
February 18, 2110 (Saros 132)	January 19, 2121 (Saros 133)	December 19, 2131 (Saros 134)	November 17, 2142 (Saros 135)	October 17, 2153 (Saros 136)
September 16, 2164 (Saros 137)	August 16, 2175 (Saros 138)	July 16, 2186 (Saros 139)	June 15, 2197 (Saros 140)	

=== Inex series ===
This eclipse is a part of the long period inex cycle, repeating at alternating nodes, every 358 synodic months (≈ 10,571.95 days, or 29 years minus 20 days). Their appearance and longitude are irregular due to a lack of synchronization with the anomalistic month (period of perigee). However, groupings of 3 inex cycles (≈ 87 years minus 2 months) comes close (≈ 1,151.02 anomalistic months), so eclipses are similar in these groupings.

Series members between 1801 and 2200
April 26, 1827 (Saros 116)	April 5, 1856 (Saros 117)	March 16, 1885 (Saros 118)
February 25, 1914 (Saros 119)	February 4, 1943 (Saros 120)	January 16, 1972 (Saros 121)
December 25, 2000 (Saros 122)	December 5, 2029 (Saros 123)	November 16, 2058 (Saros 124)
October 26, 2087 (Saros 125)	October 6, 2116 (Saros 126)	September 16, 2145 (Saros 127)
August 27, 2174 (Saros 128)		
