= Solar Saros 117 =

Saros cycle series 117 for solar eclipses

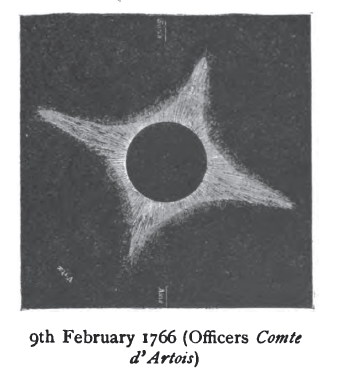
February 9, 1766 Series member 55

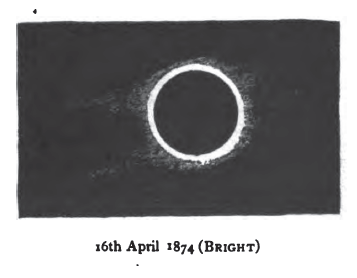
April 16, 1874 Series member 61

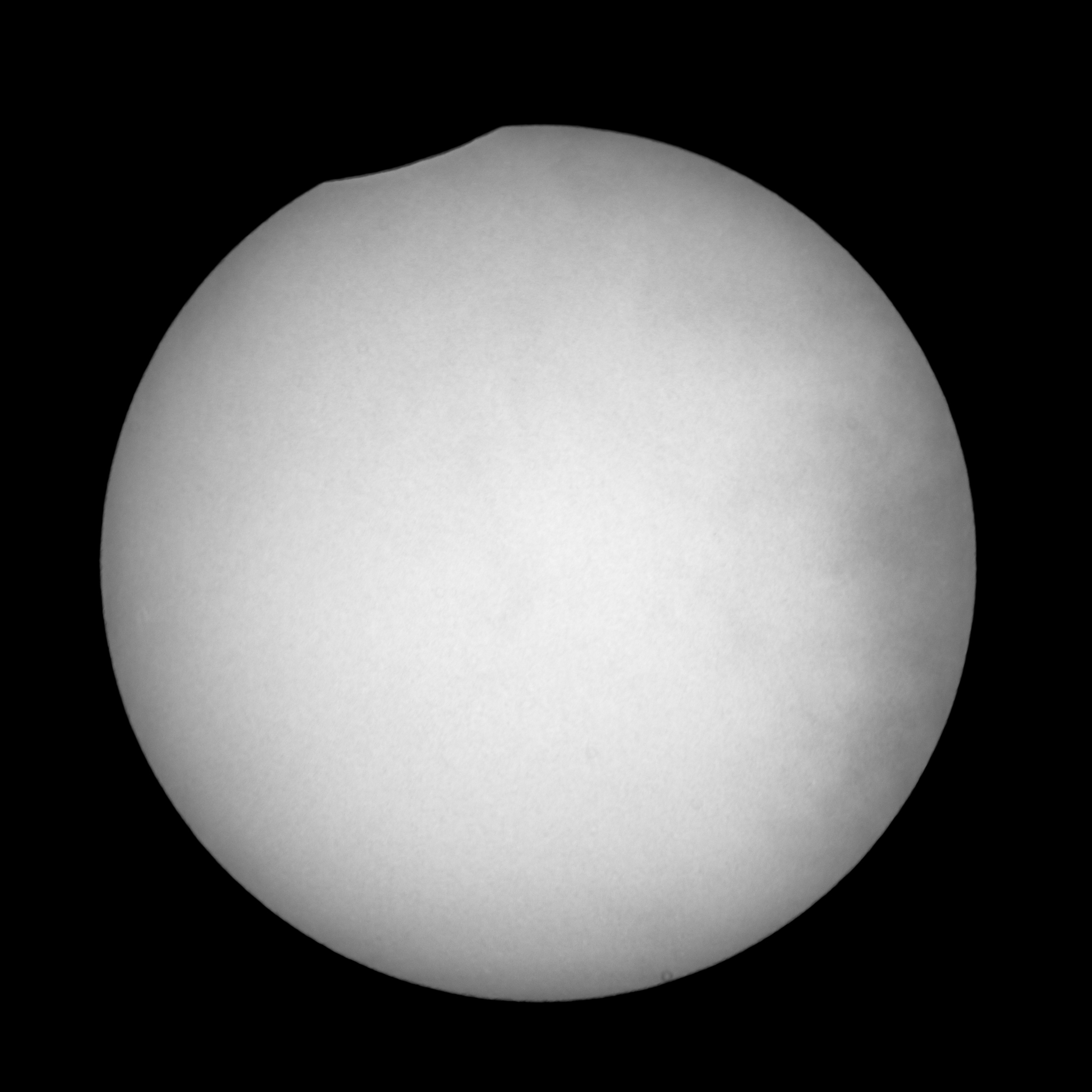
July 13, 2018 Series member 69

Saros 117

Saros cycle series 117 for solar eclipses occurs at the Moon's ascending node, repeating every 18 years, 11 days, containing 71 eclipses, including 56 umbral eclipses (23 annular, 5 hybrid, 28 total). The first eclipse in this series was on June 24, 792 AD. The final eclipse in this series will be on August 3, 2054. The most recent eclipse was a partial eclipse on 13 July 2018 and the next one will be a partial eclipse on 23 July 2036.

The longest totality was 4 minutes 19 seconds on 26 April 1892, the longest annular was 9 minutes 26 seconds on 3 December 1062.

This solar saros is linked to Lunar Saros 110.

== Umbral eclipses ==
Umbral eclipses (annular, total and hybrid) can be further classified as either: 1) Central (two limits), 2) Central (one limit) or 3) Non-Central (one limit). The statistical distribution of these classes in Saros series 117 appears in the following table.

Classification	Number	Percent
All Umbral eclipses	56	100.00%
Central (two limits)	54	96.43%
Central (one limit)	1	1.79%
Non-central (one limit)	1	1.79%

== All eclipses ==
Note: Dates are given in the Julian calendar prior to 15 October 1582, and in the Gregorian calendar after that.

Saros	Member	Date	Time (Greatest) UTC	Type	Location Lat, Long	Gamma	Mag.	Width (km)	Duration (min:sec)	Ref
117	1	June 24, 792	6:42:26	Partial	66.4N 80.5W	1.532	0.0523			
117	2	July 5, 810	13:05:52	Partial	67.4N 172.4E	1.4484	0.1957			
117	3	July 15, 828	19:32:47	Partial	68.4N 64E	1.3671	0.3348			
117	4	July 27, 846	2:04:20	Partial	69.3N 46.2W	1.2888	0.4684			
117	5	August 6, 864	8:42:56	Partial	70.2N 158.6W	1.2155	0.5928			
117	6	August 17, 882	15:29:23	Partial	71N 86.3E	1.1482	0.7066			
117	7	August 27, 900	22:23:35	Partial	71.6N 31.2W	1.0865	0.8104			
117	8	September 8, 918	5:27:33	Partial	72N 151.7W	1.0322	0.9012			
117	9	September 18, 936	12:40:59	Annular	70.1N 58.4E	0.9851	0.9215	-	5m 59s	
117	10	September 29, 954	20:04:21	Annular	61.4N 80.1W	0.9454	0.922	912	6m 47s	
117	11	October 10, 972	3:36:50	Annular	54N 155.2E	0.9127	0.9216	724	7m 31s	
117	12	October 21, 990	11:18:42	Annular	47.9N 32.3E	0.887	0.9211	644	8m 9s	
117	13	October 31, 1008	19:08:48	Annular	43N 90.9W	0.8676	0.9207	601	8m 43s	
117	14	November 12, 1026	3:05:07	Annular	39N 145.2E	0.8527	0.9208	573	9m 8s	
117	15	November 22, 1044	11:07:50	Annular	36N 20.3E	0.8426	0.9213	555	9m 24s	
117	16	December 3, 1062	19:13:41	Annular	33.8N 105.1W	0.8342	0.9223	534	9m 26s	
117	17	December 14, 1080	3:22:42	Annular	32.4N 129E	0.8281	0.9239	512	9m 16s	
117	18	December 25, 1098	11:30:26	Annular	31.4N 3.5E	0.8201	0.9263	483	8m 53s	
117	19	January 4, 1117	19:38:51	Annular	31N 121.9W	0.8121	0.9292	450	8m 19s	
117	20	January 16, 1135	3:43:17	Annular	30.9N 114E	0.7997	0.9329	410	7m 39s	
117	21	January 26, 1153	11:44:14	Annular	31.1N 9W	0.7839	0.9372	367	6m 53s	
117	22	February 6, 1171	19:38:30	Annular	31.6N 129.7W	0.7618	0.9421	321	6m 5s	
117	23	February 17, 1189	3:27:37	Annular	32.3N 111.4E	0.7346	0.9475	276	5m 18s	
117	24	February 28, 1207	11:09:12	Annular	33.2N 5W	0.7002	0.9534	232	4m 32s	
117	25	March 10, 1225	18:43:38	Annular	34.3N 118.9W	0.659	0.9596	190	3m 49s	
117	26	March 22, 1243	2:10:26	Annular	35.5N 129.9E	0.6104	0.9659	152	3m 8s	
117	27	April 1, 1261	9:30:56	Annular	36.6N 21E	0.556	0.9724	117	2m 31s	
117	28	April 12, 1279	16:44:04	Annular	37.4N 85.3W	0.4945	0.9788	86	1m 55s	
117	29	April 22, 1297	23:51:57	Annular	37.7N 170.4E	0.4275	0.985	58	1m 22s	
117	30	May 4, 1315	6:54:52	Annular	37.3N 67.7E	0.3556	0.9909	34	0m 51s	
117	31	May 14, 1333	13:55:23	Annular	36.1N 34.2W	0.2806	0.9964	13	0m 20s	
117	32	May 25, 1351	20:52:03	Hybrid	33.7N 135.5W	0.2015	1.0016	6	0m 9s	
117	33	June 5, 1369	3:49:31	Hybrid	30.4N 122.5E	0.1222	1.0061	21	0m 37s	
117	34	June 16, 1387	10:46:23	Hybrid	26N 19.8E	0.0416	1.01	35	1m 3s	
117	35	June 26, 1405	17:47:04	Hybrid	20.9N 84.7W	-0.037	1.0134	46	1m 26s	
117	36	July 8, 1423	0:48:40	Hybrid	15N 169.7E	-0.1158	1.0161	55	1m 45s	
117	37	July 18, 1441	7:57:16	Total	8.6N 61.6E	-0.1896	1.0181	63	1m 59s	
117	38	July 29, 1459	15:10:11	Total	1.8N 48.2W	-0.2605	1.0196	69	2m 7s	
117	39	August 8, 1477	22:30:57	Total	5.2S 160.5W	-0.3257	1.0206	74	2m 10s	
117	40	August 20, 1495	5:58:28	Total	12.4S 85.1E	-0.3862	1.021	77	2m 8s	
117	41	August 30, 1513	13:35:52	Total	19.5S 31.9W	-0.4392	1.0211	80	2m 3s	
117	42	September 10, 1531	21:21:52	Total	26.4S 151W	-0.4857	1.0208	81	1m 56s	
117	43	September 21, 1549	5:16:24	Total	33.2S 88E	-0.5257	1.0205	82	1m 49s	
117	44	October 2, 1567	13:20:27	Total	39.7S 34.9W	-0.5584	1.02	82	1m 42s	
117	45	October 22, 1585	21:33:25	Total	45.7S 159.2W	-0.5846	1.0196	82	1m 35s	
117	46	November 3, 1603	5:54:55	Total	51.1S 75.6E	-0.6041	1.0193	83	1m 31s	
117	47	November 13, 1621	14:23:13	Total	55.8S 49.7W	-0.6187	1.0194	84	1m 28s	
117	48	November 24, 1639	22:58:55	Total	59.6S 174.7W	-0.6278	1.0197	87	1m 27s	
117	49	December 5, 1657	7:39:36	Total	62.1S 61.3E	-0.6335	1.0205	91	1m 29s	
117	50	December 16, 1675	16:24:03	Total	63.1S 62W	-0.6367	1.0218	97	1m 33s	
117	51	December 27, 1693	1:10:50	Total	62.6S 174.3E	-0.6387	1.0236	105	1m 39s	
117	52	January 8, 1712	9:58:39	Total	60.6S 49.2E	-0.6406	1.0258	114	1m 48s	
117	53	January 18, 1730	18:45:15	Total	57.8S 77.4W	-0.644	1.0285	126	1m 59s	
117	54	January 30, 1748	3:29:13	Total	54.4S 154.8E	-0.6501	1.0316	140	2m 12s	
117	55	February 9, 1766	12:09:44	Total	50.7S 26.6E	-0.6598	1.0352	156	2m 27s	
117	56	February 20, 1784	20:45:38	Total	47.2S 101.5W	-0.6739	1.0389	174	2m 44s	
117	57	March 4, 1802	5:14:29	Total	44S 131.5E	-0.6943	1.0428	196	3m 2s	
117	58	March 14, 1820	13:37:15	Total	41.5S 5.7E	-0.7199	1.0467	220	3m 20s	
117	59	March 25, 1838	21:52:16	Total	39.7S 118.3W	-0.7525	1.0505	249	3m 39s	
117	60	April 5, 1856	6:01:01	Total	39.1S 119.2E	-0.7906	1.0539	285	3m 56s	
117	61	April 16, 1874	14:00:53	Total	39.9S 0.9W	-0.8364	1.0569	335	4m 11s	
117	62	April 26, 1892	21:55:20	Total	42.5S 119.4W	-0.887	1.0591	414	4m 19s	
117	63	May 9, 1910	5:42:13	Total	48.2S 125.2E	-0.9437	1.06	594	4m 15s	
117	64	May 19, 1928	13:24:20	Total	63.3S 22.5E	1.0048	1.014	-	-	
117	65	May 30, 1946	21:00:24	Partial	64.1S 101W	-1.0711	0.8865			
117	66	June 10, 1964	4:34:07	Partial	65S 135.9E	-1.1393	0.7545			
117	67	June 21, 1982	12:04:33	Partial	65.9S 13.2E	-1.2102	0.6168			
117	68	July 1, 2000	19:33:34	Partial	66.9S 109.5W	-1.2821	0.4768			
117	69	July 13, 2018	3:02:16	Partial	67.9S 127.4E	-1.3542	0.3365			
117	70	July 23, 2036	10:32:06	Partial	68.9S 3.6E	-1.425	0.1991			
117	71	August 3, 2054	18:04:02	Partial	69.8S 121.3W	-1.4941	0.0655			
