= Solar eclipse of April 16, 1874 =

Total eclipse

- Total eclipse
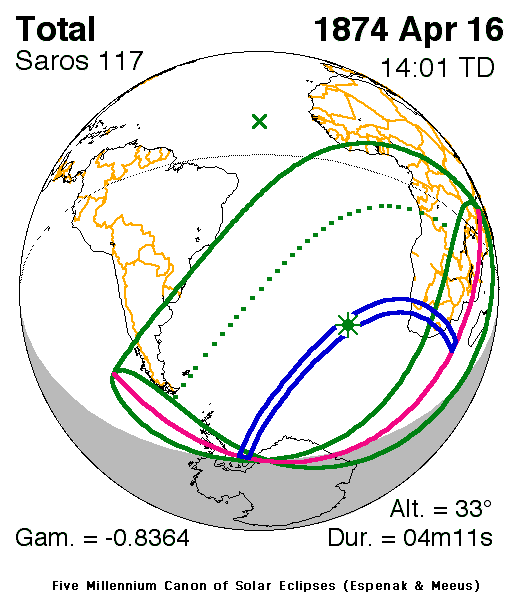
- Map
- Gamma: −0.8364
- Magnitude: 1.0569

Maximum eclipse
- Duration: 251 s (4 min 11 s)
- Coordinates: 39.9°S 0.9°W
- Max. width of band: 335 km (208 mi)

Times (UTC)
- Greatest eclipse: 14:00:53

References
- Saros: 117 (61 of 71)
- Catalog # (SE5000): 9220

A total solar eclipse occurred at the Moon's ascending node of orbit on Thursday, April 16, 1874, with a magnitude of 1.0569. A solar eclipse occurs when the Moon passes between Earth and the Sun, thereby totally or partly obscuring the image of the Sun for a viewer on Earth. A total solar eclipse occurs when the Moon's apparent diameter is larger than the Sun's, blocking all direct sunlight, turning day into darkness. Totality occurs in a narrow path across Earth's surface, with the partial solar eclipse visible over a surrounding region thousands of kilometres wide. Occurring about 16 hours after perigee (on April 15, 1874, at 22:45 UTC), the Moon's apparent diameter was larger.

The path of totality was visible from parts of modern-day southern Namibia, South Africa, and Lesotho. A partial solar eclipse was also visible for parts of southern South America, Antarctica, Southern Africa, and Central Africa.

== Observations ==
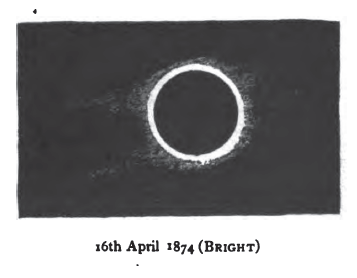

== Eclipse details ==
Shown below are two tables displaying details about this particular solar eclipse. The first table outlines times at which the Moon's penumbra or umbra attains the specific parameter, and the second table describes various other parameters pertaining to this eclipse.

April 16, 1874 Solar Eclipse Times
Event	Time (UTC)
First Penumbral External Contact	1874 April 16 at 11:48:36.3 UTC
First Umbral External Contact	1874 April 16 at 13:02:40.7 UTC
First Central Line	1874 April 16 at 13:04:57.8 UTC
First Umbral Internal Contact	1874 April 16 at 13:07:19.0 UTC
Equatorial Conjunction	1874 April 16 at 13:17:18.5 UTC
Ecliptic Conjunction	1874 April 16 at 13:52:28.7 UTC
Greatest Eclipse	1874 April 16 at 14:00:52.7 UTC
Greatest Duration	1874 April 16 at 14:01:57.1 UTC
Last Umbral Internal Contact	1874 April 16 at 14:54:54.7 UTC
Last Central Line	1874 April 16 at 14:57:14.8 UTC
Last Umbral External Contact	1874 April 16 at 14:59:30.9 UTC
Last Penumbral External Contact	1874 April 16 at 16:13:28.2 UTC

April 16, 1874 Solar Eclipse Parameters
Parameter	Value
Eclipse Magnitude	1.05692
Eclipse Obscuration	1.11707
Gamma	−0.83637
Sun Right Ascension	01h37m54.7s
Sun Declination	+10°11'33.9"
Sun Semi-Diameter	15'55.5"
Sun Equatorial Horizontal Parallax	08.8"
Moon Right Ascension	01h39m28.1s
Moon Declination	+09°25'57.8"
Moon Semi-Diameter	16'40.8"
Moon Equatorial Horizontal Parallax	1°01'12.9"
ΔT	-2.8 s

== Eclipse season ==
This eclipse is part of an eclipse season, a period, roughly every six months, when eclipses occur. Only two (or occasionally three) eclipse seasons occur each year, and each season lasts about 35 days and repeats just short of six months (173 days) later; thus two full eclipse seasons always occur each year. Either two or three eclipses happen each eclipse season. In the sequence below, each eclipse is separated by a fortnight.

Eclipse season of April–May 1874
April 16, 1874 Ascending node (new moon)	May 1 Descending node (full moon)
Total solar eclipse Solar Saros 117	Partial lunar eclipse Lunar Saros 129

== Related eclipses ==
=== Eclipses in 1874 ===
- A total solar eclipse on April 16.
- A partial lunar eclipse on May 1.
- An annular solar eclipse on October 10.
- A total lunar eclipse on October 25.

=== Metonic ===
- Preceded by: Solar eclipse of June 28, 1870
- Followed by: Solar eclipse of February 2, 1878

=== Tzolkinex ===
- Preceded by: Solar eclipse of March 6, 1867
- Followed by: Solar eclipse of May 27, 1881

=== Half-Saros ===
- Preceded by: Lunar eclipse of April 11, 1865
- Followed by: Lunar eclipse of April 22, 1883

=== Tritos ===
- Preceded by: Solar eclipse of May 17, 1863
- Followed by: Solar eclipse of March 16, 1885

=== Solar Saros 117 ===
- Preceded by: Solar eclipse of April 5, 1856
- Followed by: Solar eclipse of April 26, 1892

=== Inex ===
- Preceded by: Solar eclipse of May 6, 1845
- Followed by: Solar eclipse of March 29, 1903

=== Triad ===
- Preceded by: Solar eclipse of June 15, 1787
- Followed by: Solar eclipse of February 15, 1961

=== Solar eclipses of 1874–1877 ===
This eclipse is a member of a semester series. An eclipse in a semester series of solar eclipses repeats approximately every 177 days and 4 hours (a semester) at alternating nodes of the Moon's orbit.

The partial solar eclipse on August 9, 1877 occurs in the next lunar year eclipse set.

Solar eclipse series sets from 1874 to 1877
Ascending node			Descending node		
Saros	Map	Gamma	Saros	Map	Gamma
117	April 16, 1874 Total	−0.8364	122	October 10, 1874 Annular	0.9889
127	April 6, 1875 Total	−0.1292	132	September 29, 1875 Annular	0.2427
137	March 25, 1876 Annular	0.6142	142	September 17, 1876 Total	−0.5054
147	March 15, 1877 Partial	1.3924	152	September 7, 1877 Partial	−1.1985

=== Saros 117 ===
This eclipse is a part of Saros series 117, repeating every 18 years, 11 days, and containing 71 events. The series started with a partial solar eclipse on June 24, 792 AD. It contains annular eclipses from September 18, 936 AD through May 14, 1333; hybrid eclipses from May 25, 1351 through July 8, 1423; and total eclipses from July 18, 1441 through May 19, 1928. The series ends at member 71 as a partial eclipse on August 3, 2054. Its eclipses are tabulated in three columns; every third eclipse in the same column is one exeligmos apart, so they all cast shadows over approximately the same parts of the Earth.

The longest duration of annularity was produced by member 16 at 9 minutes, 26 seconds on December 3, 1062, and the longest duration of totality was produced by member 62 at 4 minutes, 19 seconds on April 26, 1892. All eclipses in this series occur at the Moon’s ascending node of orbit.

Series members 57–71 occur between 1801 and 2054:
57	58	59
March 4, 1802	March 14, 1820	March 25, 1838
60	61	62
April 5, 1856	April 16, 1874	April 26, 1892
63	64	65
May 9, 1910	May 19, 1928	May 30, 1946
66	67	68
June 10, 1964	June 21, 1982	July 1, 2000
69	70	71
July 13, 2018	July 23, 2036	August 3, 2054

=== Metonic series ===
The metonic series repeats eclipses every 19 years (6939.69 days), lasting about 5 cycles. Eclipses occur in nearly the same calendar date. In addition, the octon subseries repeats 1/5 of that or every 3.8 years (1387.94 days). All eclipses in this table occur at the Moon's ascending node.

23 eclipse events between February 3, 1859 and June 29, 1946
February 1–3	November 21–22	September 8–10	June 28–29	April 16–18
109	111	113	115	117
February 3, 1859	November 21, 1862		June 28, 1870	April 16, 1874
119	121	123	125	127
February 2, 1878	November 21, 1881	September 8, 1885	June 28, 1889	April 16, 1893
129	131	133	135	137
February 1, 1897	November 22, 1900	September 9, 1904	June 28, 1908	April 17, 1912
139	141	143	145	147
February 3, 1916	November 22, 1919	September 10, 1923	June 29, 1927	April 18, 1931
149	151	153	155	
February 3, 1935	November 21, 1938	September 10, 1942	June 29, 1946	

=== Tritos series ===
This eclipse is a part of a tritos cycle, repeating at alternating nodes every 135 synodic months (≈ 3986.63 days, or 11 years minus 1 month). Their appearance and longitude are irregular due to a lack of synchronization with the anomalistic month (period of perigee), but groupings of 3 tritos cycles (≈ 33 years minus 3 months) come close (≈ 434.044 anomalistic months), so eclipses are similar in these groupings.

Series members between 1801 and 2200
October 19, 1808 (Saros 111)	September 19, 1819 (Saros 112)	August 18, 1830 (Saros 113)	July 18, 1841 (Saros 114)	June 17, 1852 (Saros 115)
May 17, 1863 (Saros 116)	April 16, 1874 (Saros 117)	March 16, 1885 (Saros 118)	February 13, 1896 (Saros 119)	January 14, 1907 (Saros 120)
December 14, 1917 (Saros 121)	November 12, 1928 (Saros 122)	October 12, 1939 (Saros 123)	September 12, 1950 (Saros 124)	August 11, 1961 (Saros 125)
July 10, 1972 (Saros 126)	June 11, 1983 (Saros 127)	May 10, 1994 (Saros 128)	April 8, 2005 (Saros 129)	March 9, 2016 (Saros 130)
February 6, 2027 (Saros 131)	January 5, 2038 (Saros 132)	December 5, 2048 (Saros 133)	November 5, 2059 (Saros 134)	October 4, 2070 (Saros 135)
September 3, 2081 (Saros 136)	August 3, 2092 (Saros 137)	July 4, 2103 (Saros 138)	June 3, 2114 (Saros 139)	May 3, 2125 (Saros 140)
April 1, 2136 (Saros 141)	March 2, 2147 (Saros 142)	January 30, 2158 (Saros 143)	December 29, 2168 (Saros 144)	November 28, 2179 (Saros 145)
October 29, 2190 (Saros 146)

=== Inex series ===
This eclipse is a part of the long period inex cycle, repeating at alternating nodes, every 358 synodic months (≈ 10,571.95 days, or 29 years minus 20 days). Their appearance and longitude are irregular due to a lack of synchronization with the anomalistic month (period of perigee). However, groupings of 3 inex cycles (≈ 87 years minus 2 months) comes close (≈ 1,151.02 anomalistic months), so eclipses are similar in these groupings.

Series members between 1801 and 2200
May 27, 1816 (Saros 115)	May 6, 1845 (Saros 116)	April 16, 1874 (Saros 117)
March 29, 1903 (Saros 118)	March 7, 1932 (Saros 119)	February 15, 1961 (Saros 120)
January 26, 1990 (Saros 121)	January 6, 2019 (Saros 122)	December 16, 2047 (Saros 123)
November 26, 2076 (Saros 124)	November 6, 2105 (Saros 125)	October 17, 2134 (Saros 126)
September 28, 2163 (Saros 127)	September 6, 2192 (Saros 128)	
