= Solar eclipse of December 16, 2047 =

Future partial solar eclipse

- Partial eclipse
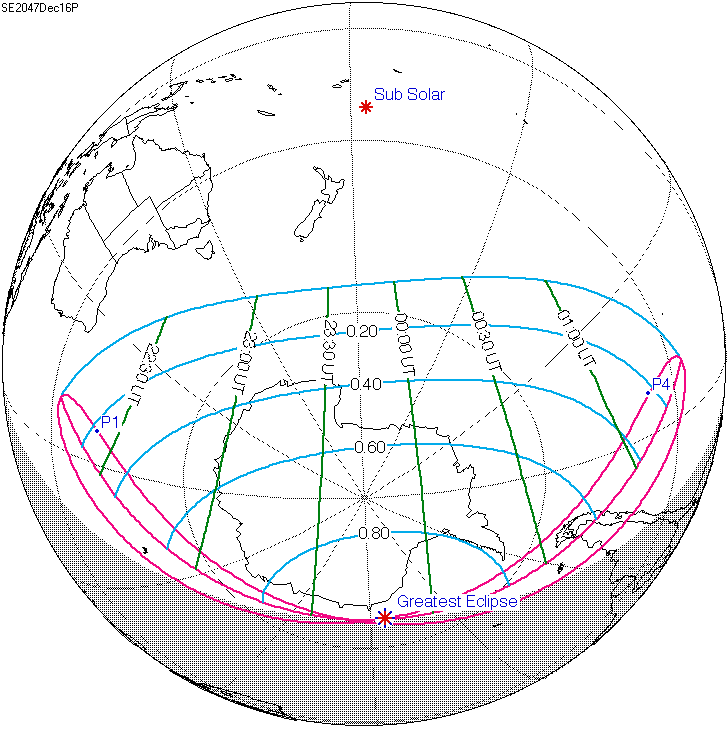
- Map
- Gamma: −1.0661
- Magnitude: 0.8816

Maximum eclipse
- Coordinates: 66.4°S 6.6°W

Times (UTC)
- Greatest eclipse: 23:50:12

References
- Saros: 123 (55 of 70)
- Catalog # (SE5000): 9614

A partial solar eclipse will occur at the Moon's ascending node of orbit between Monday, December 16 and Tuesday, December 17, 2047, with a magnitude of 0.8816. A solar eclipse occurs when the Moon passes between Earth and the Sun, thereby totally or partly obscuring the image of the Sun for a viewer on Earth. A partial solar eclipse occurs in the polar regions of the Earth when the center of the Moon's shadow misses the Earth.

This will be the last of four partial solar eclipses in 2047, with the others occurring on January 26, June 23, and July 22.

The partial solar eclipse will be visible for parts of Antarctica, southern Chile, and southern Argentina.

== Images ==
Animated path

== Eclipse timing ==
=== Places experiencing partial eclipse ===
Solar Eclipse of December 16, 2047 (Local Times)
Country or territory	City or place	Start of partial eclipse	Maximum eclipse	End of partial eclipse	Duration of eclipse (hr:min)	Maximum coverage
Antarctica	Casey Station (Note: The times listed for this location occur on December 17, 2047, local time.)	06:12:00	07:00:29	07:50:55	1:39	39.55%
Antarctica	Davis Station	05:18:48	06:07:45	06:58:10	1:39	60.59%
Australia	Macquarie Island	10:06:14	10:10:10	10:14:05	0:08	0.01%
Antarctica	Dumont d'Urville Station	08:22:32	09:10:23	09:59:52	1:37	25.26%
Antarctica	Mawson Station	03:23:10	04:11:24	05:00:52	1:38	67.61%
French Southern and Antarctic Lands	Port-aux-Français	04:07:42 (sunrise)	04:11:57	04:30:28	0:23	20.33%
Antarctica	Concordia Station	06:26:22	07:18:29	08:11:56	1:46	46.82%
Antarctica	Zucchelli Station	11:40:55	12:33:56	13:27:32	1:47	36.33%
Antarctica	McMurdo Station	11:43:08	12:37:07	13:31:31	1:48	43.02%
Antarctica	Troll	22:54:34	23:43:19	00:32:04 (Note: The time listed here for this location occurs on December 17, 2047, local time.)	1:38	84.32%
Antarctica	Neumayer Station III	23:00:28	23:49:01	00:37:22	1:37	85.03%
Antarctica	Belgrano II Base	20:04:29	20:55:47	21:46:35	1:42	79.07%
Falkland Islands	Stanley	20:47:23	21:02:04	21:06:40 (sunset)	0:19	17.73%
Argentina	Bariloche	21:11:02	21:12:55	21:14:47 (sunset)	0:04	0.73%
Argentina	Comodoro Rivadavia	21:01:26	21:13:20	21:17:09 (sunset)	0:16	11.93%
Antarctica	Orcadas Base	20:28:42	21:16:09	21:28:13 (sunset)	1:00	77.66%
Chile	Valdivia	21:14:32	21:16:20	21:18:08 (sunset)	0:04	0.66%
Chile	Osorno	21:13:15	21:16:51	21:20:12 (sunset)	0:07	1.87%
Antarctica	San Martín Base	20:27:22	21:18:12	22:07:39	1:40	71.56%
Antarctica	Marambio Base	20:29:50	21:19:00	22:06:54	1:37	74.70%
Antarctica	Rothera Research Station	20:28:33	21:19:20	22:08:41	1:40	70.90%
Antarctica	Esperanza Base	20:31:10	21:20:09	22:07:50	1:37	74.16%
Antarctica	Palmer Station	20:31:47	21:21:37	22:10:01	1:38	71.62%
Antarctica	Carlini Base	20:33:31	21:22:18	22:09:45	1:36	72.81%
Chile	Coyhaique	21:04:47	21:30:31	21:34:18 (sunset)	0:30	31.50%
Chile	Puerto Williams	20:48:12	21:35:27	22:06:02 (sunset)	1:18	62.10%
Argentina	Ushuaia	20:48:44	21:35:59	22:07:58 (sunset)	1:19	61.54%
Argentina	Río Grande	20:49:58	21:36:51	21:58:41 (sunset)	1:09	60.78%
Chile	Punta Arenas	20:52:30	21:39:20	22:07:34 (sunset)	1:15	58.05%
Argentina	El Calafate	20:57:34	21:43:23	21:57:01 (sunset)	0:59	53.63%

== Eclipse details ==
Shown below are two tables displaying details about this particular solar eclipse. The first table outlines times at which the Moon's penumbra or umbra attains the specific parameter, and the second table describes various other parameters pertaining to this eclipse.

December 16, 2047 Solar Eclipse Times
Event	Time (UTC)
First Penumbral External Contact	2047 December 16 at 21:54:51.1 UTC
Ecliptic Conjunction	2047 December 16 at 23:39:29.9 UTC
Equatorial Conjunction	2047 December 16 at 23:43:45.7 UTC
Greatest Eclipse	2047 December 16 at 23:50:12.3 UTC
Last Penumbral External Contact	2047 December 17 at 01:45:38.8 UTC

December 16, 2047 Solar Eclipse Parameters
Parameter	Value
Eclipse Magnitude	0.88166
Eclipse Obscuration	0.85529
Gamma	−1.06605
Sun Right Ascension	17h37m56.6s
Sun Declination	-23°20'10.9"
Sun Semi-Diameter	16'15.0"
Sun Equatorial Horizontal Parallax	08.9"
Moon Right Ascension	17h38m13.1s
Moon Declination	-24°24'51.1"
Moon Semi-Diameter	16'35.9"
Moon Equatorial Horizontal Parallax	1°00'54.9"
ΔT	82.9 s

== Eclipse season ==
This eclipse is part of an eclipse season, a period, roughly every six months, when eclipses occur. Only two (or occasionally three) eclipse seasons occur each year, and each season lasts about 35 days and repeats just short of six months (173 days) later; thus two full eclipse seasons always occur each year. Either two or three eclipses happen each eclipse season. In the sequence below, each eclipse is separated by a fortnight.

Eclipse season of December 2047–January 2048
December 16 Ascending node (new moon)	January 1 Descending node (full moon)
Partial solar eclipse Solar Saros 123	Total lunar eclipse Lunar Saros 135

== Related eclipses ==
=== Eclipses in 2047 ===
- A total lunar eclipse on January 12.
- A partial solar eclipse on January 26.
- A partial solar eclipse on June 23.
- A total lunar eclipse on July 7.
- A partial solar eclipse on July 22.
- A partial solar eclipse on December 16.

=== Metonic ===
- Preceded by: Solar eclipse of February 28, 2044
- Followed by: Solar eclipse of October 4, 2051

=== Tzolkinex ===
- Preceded by: Solar eclipse of November 4, 2040
- Followed by: Solar eclipse of January 27, 2055

=== Half-Saros ===
- Preceded by: Lunar eclipse of December 11, 2038
- Followed by: Lunar eclipse of December 22, 2056

=== Tritos ===
- Preceded by: Solar eclipse of January 16, 2037
- Followed by: Solar eclipse of November 16, 2058

=== Solar Saros 123 ===
- Preceded by: Solar eclipse of December 5, 2029
- Followed by: Solar eclipse of December 27, 2065

=== Inex ===
- Preceded by: Solar eclipse of January 6, 2019
- Followed by: Solar eclipse of November 26, 2076

=== Triad ===
- Preceded by: Solar eclipse of February 15, 1961
- Followed by: Solar eclipse of October 17, 2134

=== Solar eclipses of 2047–2050 ===
This eclipse is a member of a semester series. An eclipse in a semester series of solar eclipses repeats approximately every 177 days and 4 hours (a semester) at alternating nodes of the Moon's orbit.

The partial solar eclipses on January 26, 2047 and July 22, 2047 occur in the previous lunar year eclipse set.

Solar eclipse series sets from 2047 to 2050
Descending node			Ascending node		
Saros	Map	Gamma	Saros	Map	Gamma
118	June 23, 2047 Partial	1.3766	123	December 16, 2047 Partial	−1.0661
128	June 11, 2048 Annular	0.6468	133	December 5, 2048 Total	−0.3973
138	May 31, 2049 Annular	−0.1187	143	November 25, 2049 Hybrid	0.2943
148	May 20, 2050 Hybrid	−0.8688	153	November 14, 2050 Partial	1.0447

=== Saros 123 ===
This eclipse is a part of Saros series 123, repeating every 18 years, 11 days, and containing 70 events. The series started with a partial solar eclipse on April 29, 1074. It contains annular eclipses from July 2, 1182 through April 19, 1651; hybrid eclipses from April 30, 1669 through May 22, 1705; and total eclipses from June 3, 1723 through October 23, 1957. The series ends at member 70 as a partial eclipse on May 31, 2318. Its eclipses are tabulated in three columns; every third eclipse in the same column is one exeligmos apart, so they all cast shadows over approximately the same parts of the Earth.

The longest duration of annularity was produced by member 19 at 8 minutes, 7 seconds on November 9, 1398, and the longest duration of totality was produced by member 42 at 3 minutes, 27 seconds on July 27, 1813. All eclipses in this series occur at the Moon’s ascending node of orbit.

Series members 42–63 occur between 1801 and 2200:
42	43	44
July 27, 1813	August 7, 1831	August 18, 1849
45	46	47
August 29, 1867	September 8, 1885	September 21, 1903
48	49	50
October 1, 1921	October 12, 1939	October 23, 1957
51	52	53
November 3, 1975	November 13, 1993	November 25, 2011
54	55	56
December 5, 2029	December 16, 2047	December 27, 2065
57	58	59
January 7, 2084	January 19, 2102	January 30, 2120
60	61	62
February 9, 2138	February 21, 2156	March 3, 2174
63
March 13, 2192

=== Metonic series ===
The metonic series repeats eclipses every 19 years (6939.69 days), lasting about 5 cycles. Eclipses occur in nearly the same calendar date. In addition, the octon subseries repeats 1/5 of that or every 3.8 years (1387.94 days). All eclipses in this table occur at the Moon's ascending node.

21 eclipse events between July 23, 2036 and July 23, 2112
July 23–24	May 11	February 27–28	December 16–17	October 4–5
117	119	121	123	125
July 23, 2036	May 11, 2040	February 28, 2044	December 16, 2047	October 4, 2051
127	129	131	133	135
July 24, 2055	May 11, 2059	February 28, 2063	December 17, 2066	October 4, 2070
137	139	141	143	145
July 24, 2074	May 11, 2078	February 27, 2082	December 16, 2085	October 4, 2089
147	149	151	153	155
July 23, 2093	May 11, 2097	February 28, 2101	December 17, 2104	October 5, 2108
157
July 23, 2112

=== Tritos series ===
This eclipse is a part of a tritos cycle, repeating at alternating nodes every 135 synodic months (≈ 3986.63 days, or 11 years minus 1 month). Their appearance and longitude are irregular due to a lack of synchronization with the anomalistic month (period of perigee), but groupings of 3 tritos cycles (≈ 33 years minus 3 months) come close (≈ 434.044 anomalistic months), so eclipses are similar in these groupings.

The partial solar eclipses on March 27, 1884 (part of Saros 108) and December 24, 1916 (part of Saros 111) are also a part of this series but are not included in the table below.

Series members between 1971 and 2200
July 22, 1971 (Saros 116)	June 21, 1982 (Saros 117)	May 21, 1993 (Saros 118)	April 19, 2004 (Saros 119)	March 20, 2015 (Saros 120)
February 17, 2026 (Saros 121)	January 16, 2037 (Saros 122)	December 16, 2047 (Saros 123)	November 16, 2058 (Saros 124)	October 15, 2069 (Saros 125)
September 13, 2080 (Saros 126)	August 15, 2091 (Saros 127)	July 15, 2102 (Saros 128)	June 13, 2113 (Saros 129)	May 14, 2124 (Saros 130)
April 13, 2135 (Saros 131)	March 12, 2146 (Saros 132)	February 9, 2157 (Saros 133)	January 10, 2168 (Saros 134)	December 9, 2178 (Saros 135)
November 8, 2189 (Saros 136)	October 9, 2200 (Saros 137)			

=== Inex series ===
This eclipse is a part of the long period inex cycle, repeating at alternating nodes, every 358 synodic months (≈ 10,571.95 days, or 29 years minus 20 days). Their appearance and longitude are irregular due to a lack of synchronization with the anomalistic month (period of perigee). However, groupings of 3 inex cycles (≈ 87 years minus 2 months) comes close (≈ 1,151.02 anomalistic months), so eclipses are similar in these groupings.

Series members between 1801 and 2200
May 27, 1816 (Saros 115)	May 6, 1845 (Saros 116)	April 16, 1874 (Saros 117)
March 29, 1903 (Saros 118)	March 7, 1932 (Saros 119)	February 15, 1961 (Saros 120)
January 26, 1990 (Saros 121)	January 6, 2019 (Saros 122)	December 16, 2047 (Saros 123)
November 26, 2076 (Saros 124)	November 6, 2105 (Saros 125)	October 17, 2134 (Saros 126)
September 28, 2163 (Saros 127)	September 6, 2192 (Saros 128)	
