= Solar eclipse of June 1, 2011 =

21st-century partial solar eclipse

- Partial eclipse
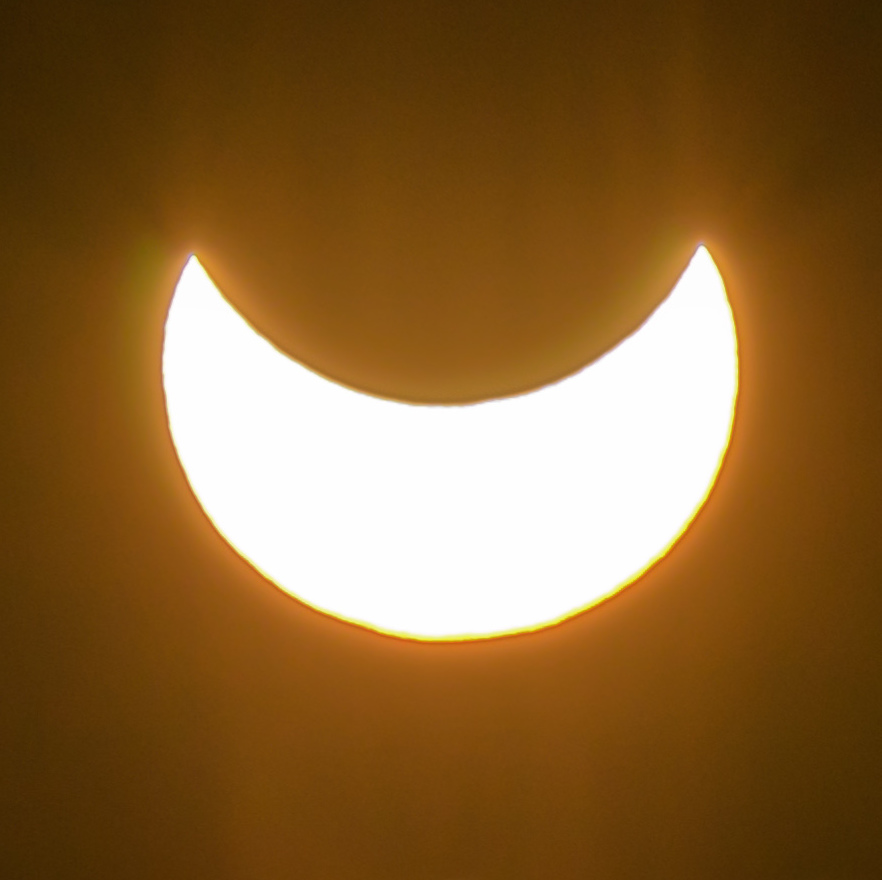
- Partial from Tromsø, Norway

- Map
- Gamma: 1.213
- Magnitude: 0.601

Maximum eclipse
- Coordinates: 67.8°N 46.8°E

Times (UTC)
- (P1) Partial begin: 19:25:17
- Greatest eclipse: 21:17:18
- (P4) Partial end: 23:06:57

References
- Saros: 118 (68 of 72)
- Catalog # (SE5000): 9532

A partial solar eclipse occurred at the Moon’s descending node of orbit on Wednesday, June 1, 2011, with a magnitude of 0.601. A solar eclipse occurs when the Moon passes between Earth and the Sun, thereby totally or partly obscuring the image of the Sun for a viewer on Earth. A partial solar eclipse occurs in the polar regions of the Earth when the center of the Moon's shadow misses the Earth.

This eclipse was the second of four partial solar eclipses in 2011, with the others occurring on January 4, July 1, and November 25.

A partial eclipse was visible for parts of Northeast Asia, Alaska, northern Canada, Greenland, northern Scandinavia, and Iceland.

== Visibility ==
Animated path

== Gallery ==
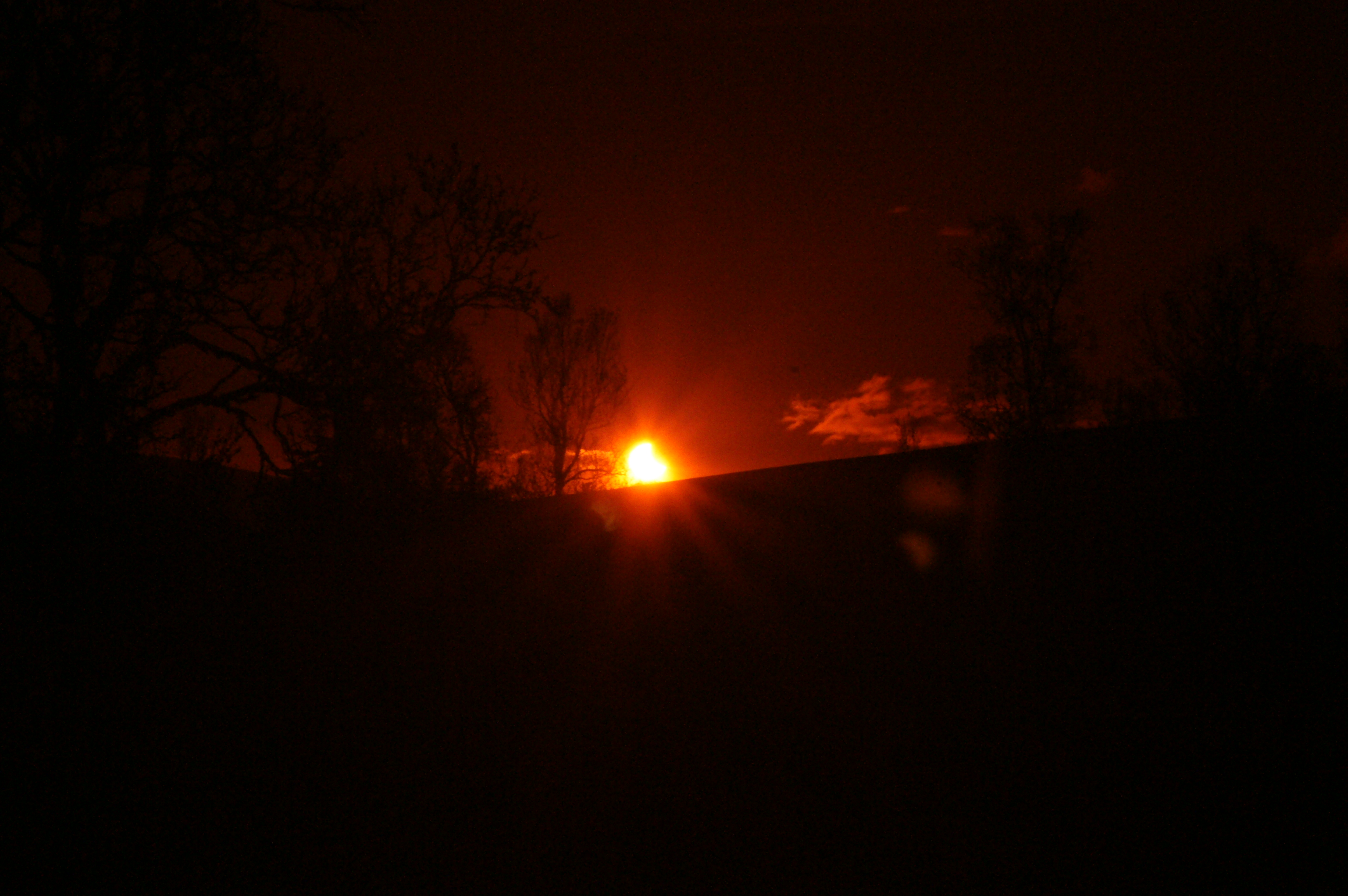
End of the eclipse seen from Tromsø, Norway

== Eclipse timing ==
=== Places experiencing partial eclipse ===
Solar Eclipse of June 1, 2011 (Local Times)
Country or territory	City or place	Start of partial eclipse	Maximum eclipse	End of partial eclipse	Duration of eclipse (hr:min)	Maximum coverage
Japan	Sapporo (Note: The times listed for this location occur on June 2, 2011, local time.)	04:27:03	04:50:24	05:14:31	0:47	2.94%
China	Harbin	03:47:11 (sunrise)	04:01:25	04:37:21	0:50	12.46%
China	Qiqihar	03:51:37 (sunrise)	04:05:02	04:43:14	0:52	15.52%
China	Hulunbuir	04:00:23 (sunrise)	04:09:59	04:50:34	0:50	19.69%
China	Mohe	03:32:13	04:13:32	04:56:36	1:26	22.15%
South Korea	Seoul	05:12:25 (sunrise)	05:13:45	05:15:04	0:03	0.12%
North Korea	Pyongyang	05:13:06 (sunrise)	05:16:13	05:20:55	0:08	0.92%
Russia	Magadan	07:36:31	08:17:44	09:00:51	1:24	13.71%
Russia	Yakutsk	05:39:05	06:25:12	07:13:15	1:34	26.48%
Mongolia	Choibalsan	04:26:12 (sunrise)	04:30:03	04:52:19	0:26	14.05%
Russia	Anadyr	07:57:53	08:36:44	09:16:55	1:19	7.49%
Finland	Rovaniemi	23:41:34	00:00:39 (Note: The time listed here for this location occurs on June 2, 2011, local time.)	00:21:23 (sunset)	0:40	19.26%
United States	Wainwright	12:19:49	13:02:36	13:46:03	1:26	8.94%
United States	Atqasuk	12:22:22	13:04:29	13:47:11	1:25	8.31%
United States	Utqiagvik	12:22:26	13:05:49	13:49:45	1:27	9.33%
Russia	Belushya Guba	00:23:32	01:13:45	02:04:13	1:41	49.55%
Finland	Utsjoki	23:38:36	00:28:24	01:17:54	1:39	48.81%
Finland	Ivalo	23:39:03	00:28:27	01:17:33	1:39	48.92%
Svalbard and Jan Mayen	Longyearbyen	22:37:36	23:29:49	00:21:37	1:44	44.98%
Finland	Kittilä	23:41:20	00:30:26	01:19:09	1:38	48.57%
Norway	Tromsø	22:43:29	23:33:16	00:22:34	1:39	47.73%
Sweden	Kiruna	22:44:08	23:33:20	00:22:03	1:38	47.89%
Canada	Alert	16:42:53	17:36:09	18:28:36	1:46	31.71%
Greenland	Danmarkshavn	20:50:25	21:42:33	22:33:43	1:43	39.31%
Greenland	Pituffik	17:56:41	18:48:12	19:38:24	1:42	25.88%
Faroe Islands	Tórshavn	22:07:48	22:48:34	22:56:24 (sunset)	0:49	37.58%
Canada	Pond Inlet	17:05:41	17:54:44	18:42:17	1:37	19.45%
Iceland	Reykjavík	21:13:34	22:01:26	22:47:54	1:34	34.63%
Greenland	Nuuk	19:26:09	20:12:18	20:56:39	1:31	21.54%
Canada	St. John's	19:41:18	20:09:28	20:36:42	0:55	5.08%

== Eclipse details ==
Shown below are two tables displaying details about this particular solar eclipse. The first table outlines times at which the Moon's penumbra or umbra attains the specific parameter, and the second table describes various other parameters pertaining to this eclipse.

June 1, 2011 Solar Eclipse Times
Event	Time (UTC)
First Penumbral External Contact	2011 June 01 at 19:26:25.5 UTC
Ecliptic Conjunction	2011 June 01 at 21:03:42.9 UTC
Greatest Eclipse	2011 June 01 at 21:17:18.4 UTC
Equatorial Conjunction	2011 June 01 at 21:23:06.3 UTC
Last Penumbral External Contact	2011 June 01 at 23:08:03.6 UTC

June 1, 2011 Solar Eclipse Parameters
Parameter	Value
Eclipse Magnitude	0.60107
Eclipse Obscuration	0.50014
Gamma	1.21300
Sun Right Ascension	04h37m53.4s
Sun Declination	+22°05'47.3"
Sun Semi-Diameter	15'46.3"
Sun Equatorial Horizontal Parallax	08.7"
Moon Right Ascension	04h37m41.0s
Moon Declination	+23°13'19.4"
Moon Semi-Diameter	15'13.4"
Moon Equatorial Horizontal Parallax	0°55'52.1"
ΔT	66.4 s

== Eclipse season ==
This eclipse is part of an eclipse season, a period, roughly every six months, when eclipses occur. Only two (or occasionally three) eclipse seasons occur each year, and each season lasts about 35 days and repeats just short of six months (173 days) later; thus two full eclipse seasons always occur each year. Either two or three eclipses happen each eclipse season. In the sequence below, each eclipse is separated by a fortnight. The first and last eclipse in this sequence is separated by one synodic month.

Eclipse season of June–July 2011
June 1 Descending node (new moon)	June 15 Ascending node (full moon)	July 1 Descending node (new moon)
Partial solar eclipse Solar Saros 118	Total lunar eclipse Lunar Saros 130	Partial solar eclipse Solar Saros 156

== Related eclipses ==
=== Eclipses in 2011 ===
- A partial solar eclipse on January 4.
- A partial solar eclipse on June 1.
- A total lunar eclipse on June 15.
- A partial solar eclipse on July 1.
- A partial solar eclipse on November 25.
- A total lunar eclipse on December 10.

=== Metonic ===
- Followed by: Solar eclipse of March 20, 2015

=== Tzolkinex ===
- Preceded by: Solar eclipse of April 19, 2004
- Followed by: Solar eclipse of July 13, 2018

=== Half-Saros ===
- Preceded by: Lunar eclipse of May 26, 2002
- Followed by: Lunar eclipse of June 5, 2020

=== Tritos ===
- Preceded by: Solar eclipse of July 1, 2000
- Followed by: Solar eclipse of April 30, 2022

=== Solar Saros 118 ===
- Preceded by: Solar eclipse of May 21, 1993
- Followed by: Solar eclipse of June 12, 2029

=== Inex ===
- Preceded by: Solar eclipse of June 21, 1982
- Followed by: Solar eclipse of May 11, 2040

=== Triad ===
- Preceded by: Solar eclipse of July 31, 1924
- Followed by: Solar eclipse of April 1, 2098

=== Solar eclipses of 2011–2014 ===
This eclipse is a member of a semester series. An eclipse in a semester series of solar eclipses repeats approximately every 177 days and 4 hours (a semester) at alternating nodes of the Moon's orbit.

The partial solar eclipses on January 4, 2011 and July 1, 2011 occur in the previous lunar year eclipse set.

Solar eclipse series sets from 2011 to 2014
Descending node			Ascending node		
Saros	Map	Gamma	Saros	Map	Gamma
118 Partial in Tromsø, Norway	June 1, 2011 Partial	1.21300	123 Hinode XRT footage	November 25, 2011 Partial	−1.05359
128 Annularity in Red Bluff, CA, USA	May 20, 2012 Annular	0.48279	133 Totality in Mount Carbine, Queensland, Australia	November 13, 2012 Total	−0.37189
138 Annularity in Churchills Head, Australia	May 10, 2013 Annular	−0.26937	143 Partial in Libreville, Gabon	November 3, 2013 Hybrid	0.32715
148 Partial in Adelaide, Australia	April 29, 2014 Annular (non-central)	−0.99996	153 Partial in Minneapolis, MN, USA	October 23, 2014 Partial	1.09078

=== Saros 118 ===
This eclipse is a part of Saros series 118, repeating every 18 years, 11 days, and containing 72 events. The series started with a partial solar eclipse on May 24, 803 AD. It contains total eclipses from August 19, 947 AD through October 25, 1650; hybrid eclipses on November 4, 1668 and November 15, 1686; and annular eclipses from November 27, 1704 through April 30, 1957. The series ends at member 72 as a partial eclipse on July 15, 2083. Its eclipses are tabulated in three columns; every third eclipse in the same column is one exeligmos apart, so they all cast shadows over approximately the same parts of the Earth.

The longest duration of totality was produced by member 34 at 6 minutes, 59 seconds on May 16, 1398, and the longest duration of annularity was produced by member 59 at 1 minutes, 58 seconds on February 23, 1849. All eclipses in this series occur at the Moon’s descending node of orbit.

Series members 57–72 occur between 1801 and 2083:
57	58	59
February 1, 1813	February 12, 1831	February 23, 1849
60	61	62
March 6, 1867	March 16, 1885	March 29, 1903
63	64	65
April 8, 1921	April 19, 1939	April 30, 1957
66	67	68
May 11, 1975	May 21, 1993	June 1, 2011
69	70	71
June 12, 2029	June 23, 2047	July 3, 2065
72
July 15, 2083

=== Metonic series ===
The metonic series repeats eclipses every 19 years (6939.69 days), lasting about 5 cycles. Eclipses occur in nearly the same calendar date. In addition, the octon subseries repeats 1/5 of that or every 3.8 years (1387.94 days). All eclipses in this table occur at the Moon's descending node.

22 eclipse events between June 1, 2011 and October 24, 2098
May 31–June 1	March 19–20	January 5–6	October 24–25	August 12–13
118	120	122	124	126
June 1, 2011	March 20, 2015	January 6, 2019	October 25, 2022	August 12, 2026
128	130	132	134	136
June 1, 2030	March 20, 2034	January 5, 2038	October 25, 2041	August 12, 2045
138	140	142	144	146
May 31, 2049	March 20, 2053	January 5, 2057	October 24, 2060	August 12, 2064
148	150	152	154	156
May 31, 2068	March 19, 2072	January 6, 2076	October 24, 2079	August 13, 2083
158	160	162	164	
June 1, 2087			October 24, 2098	

=== Tritos series ===
This eclipse is a part of a tritos cycle, repeating at alternating nodes every 135 synodic months (≈ 3986.63 days, or 11 years minus 1 month). Their appearance and longitude are irregular due to a lack of synchronization with the anomalistic month (period of perigee), but groupings of 3 tritos cycles (≈ 33 years minus 3 months) come close (≈ 434.044 anomalistic months), so eclipses are similar in these groupings.

The partial solar eclipses on April 8, 1902 (part of Saros 108) and January 5, 1935 (part of Saros 111) are also a part of this series but are not included in the table below.

Series members between 2000 and 2200
July 1, 2000 (Saros 117)	June 1, 2011 (Saros 118)	April 30, 2022 (Saros 119)	March 30, 2033 (Saros 120)	February 28, 2044 (Saros 121)
January 27, 2055 (Saros 122)	December 27, 2065 (Saros 123)	November 26, 2076 (Saros 124)	October 26, 2087 (Saros 125)	September 25, 2098 (Saros 126)
August 26, 2109 (Saros 127)	July 25, 2120 (Saros 128)	June 25, 2131 (Saros 129)	May 25, 2142 (Saros 130)	April 23, 2153 (Saros 131)
March 23, 2164 (Saros 132)	February 21, 2175 (Saros 133)	January 20, 2186 (Saros 134)	December 19, 2196 (Saros 135)	

=== Inex series ===
This eclipse is a part of the long period inex cycle, repeating at alternating nodes, every 358 synodic months (≈ 10,571.95 days, or 29 years minus 20 days). Their appearance and longitude are irregular due to a lack of synchronization with the anomalistic month (period of perigee). However, groupings of 3 inex cycles (≈ 87 years minus 2 months) comes close (≈ 1,151.02 anomalistic months), so eclipses are similar in these groupings.

Series members between 1801 and 2200
October 19, 1808 (Saros 111)		
August 20, 1895 (Saros 114)	July 31, 1924 (Saros 115)	July 11, 1953 (Saros 116)
June 21, 1982 (Saros 117)	June 1, 2011 (Saros 118)	May 11, 2040 (Saros 119)
April 21, 2069 (Saros 120)	April 1, 2098 (Saros 121)	March 13, 2127 (Saros 122)
February 21, 2156 (Saros 123)	January 31, 2185 (Saros 124)	
