= Solar eclipse of February 9, 1766 =

Total eclipse

- Total eclipse
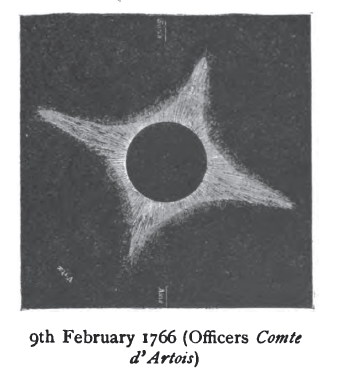

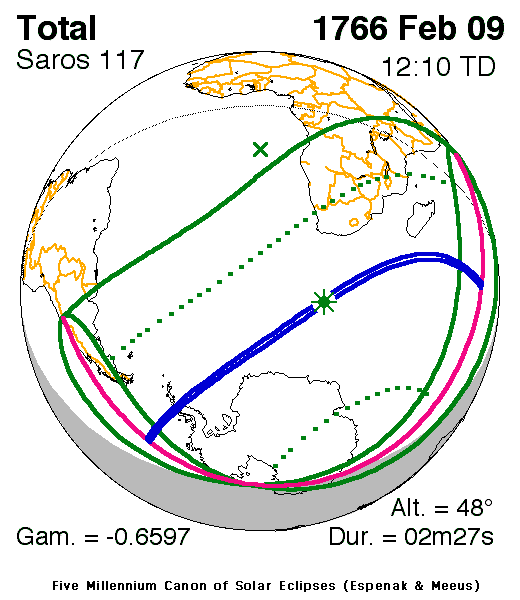
- Map
- Gamma: −0.6598
- Magnitude: 1.0352

Maximum eclipse
- Duration: 147 s (2 min 27 s)
- Coordinates: 50.7°S 26.6°E
- Max. width of band: 156 km (97 mi)

Times (UTC)
- Greatest eclipse: 12:09:44

References
- Saros: 117 (55 of 71)
- Catalog # (SE5000): 8954

A total solar eclipse occurred on Sunday, February 9, 1766. A solar eclipse occurs when the Moon passes between Earth and the Sun, thereby totally or partly obscuring the image of the Sun for a viewer on Earth. A total solar eclipse occurs when the Moon's apparent diameter is larger than the Sun's, blocking all direct sunlight, turning day into darkness. Totality occurs in a narrow path across Earth's surface, with the partial solar eclipse visible over a surrounding region thousands of kilometres wide.

== Related eclipses ==
It is a part of solar Saros 117.
