= Solar eclipse of July 1, 2000 =

20th-century partial solar eclipse

- Partial eclipse
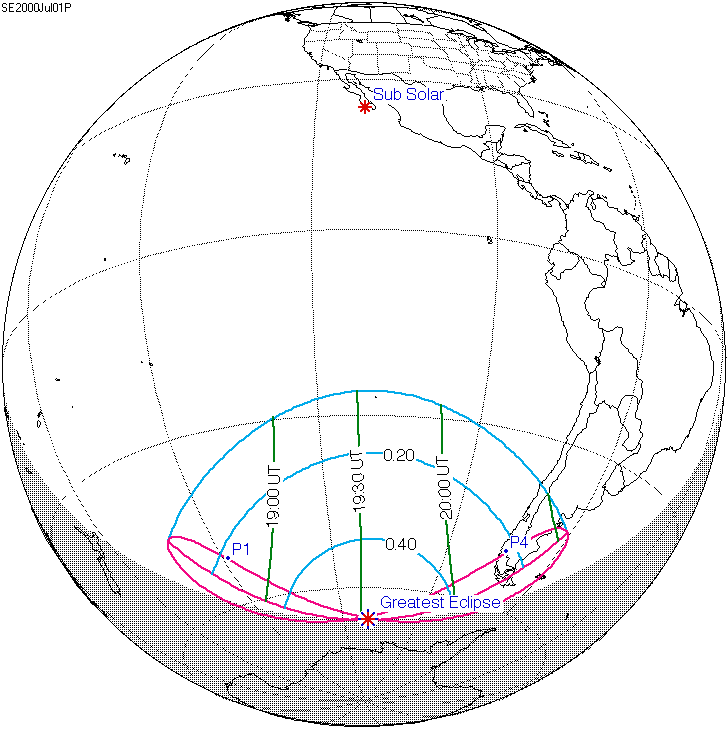
- Map
- Gamma: −1.2821
- Magnitude: 0.4768

Maximum eclipse
- Coordinates: 66.9°S 109.5°W

Times (UTC)
- Greatest eclipse: 19:33:34

References
- Saros: 117 (68 of 71)
- Catalog # (SE5000): 9509

A partial solar eclipse occurred at the Moon’s ascending node of orbit on Saturday, July 1, 2000, with a magnitude of 0.4768. A solar eclipse occurs when the Moon passes between Earth and the Sun, thereby totally or partly obscuring the image of the Sun for a viewer on Earth. A partial solar eclipse occurs in the polar regions of the Earth when the center of the Moon's shadow misses the Earth.

This was the second of four partial solar eclipses in 2000, with the others occurring on February 5, July 31, and December 25.

A partial eclipse was visible for parts of extreme southern South America near sunset.

== Images ==
Animated path

== Eclipse timing ==
=== Places experiencing partial eclipse ===
Solar Eclipse of July 1, 2000 (Local Times)
Country or territory	City or place	Start of partial eclipse	Maximum eclipse	End of partial eclipse	Duration of eclipse (hr:min)	Maximum coverage
Chile	Easter Island	13:19:48	13:36:49	13:53:46	0:34	0.35%
Chile	Puerto Williams	15:32:37	16:08:00	16:12:56 (sunset)	0:40	14.58%
Argentina	Ushuaia	16:31:57	17:11:38	17:16:32 (sunset)	0:45	15.50%
Argentina	Río Grande	16:34:54	17:14:43	17:20:07 (sunset)	0:45	14.04%
Chile	Punta Arenas	15:31:40	16:15:25	16:36:27 (sunset)	1:05	15.35%
Argentina	El Calafate	16:35:30	17:17:33	17:56:06 (sunset)	1:21	12.74%
Argentina	Río Gallegos	16:37:27	17:18:20	17:37:41 (sunset)	1:00	12.41%
Chile	Coyhaique	15:47:51	16:22:39	16:56:00	1:08	6.66%
Argentina	Facundo	16:52:53	17:24:33	17:54:59	1:02	5.15%
Argentina	Puerto Deseado	16:53:07	17:24:50	17:41:52 (sunset)	0:49	5.68%
Chile	Puerto Montt	15:59:52	16:25:43	16:50:42	0:51	2.53%
Argentina	Comodoro Rivadavia	16:56:09	17:25:47	17:54:20	0:59	4.41%
Argentina	Esquel	16:58:15	17:25:48	17:52:23	0:54	3.21%
Chile	Osorno	16:03:16	16:26:20	16:48:41	0:45	1.77%
Chile	Valdivia	16:06:44	16:26:52	16:46:28	0:40	1.17%
Argentina	Bariloche	17:05:49	17:27:25	17:48:23	0:43	1.51%
Argentina	Camarones	17:03:55	17:28:03	17:51:27	0:49	2.42%
Chile	Villarrica	16:13:34	16:28:12	16:42:34	0:29	0.46%
Chile	Temuco	16:16:17	16:28:20	16:40:11	0:24	0.25%
Argentina	Rawson	17:12:35	17:29:56	17:46:53	0:34	0.89%

== Eclipse details ==
Shown below are two tables displaying details about this particular solar eclipse. The first table outlines times at which the Moon's penumbra or umbra attains the specific parameter, and the second table describes various other parameters pertaining to this eclipse.

July 1, 2000 Solar Eclipse Times
Event	Time (UTC)
First Penumbral External Contact	2000 July 1 at 18:08:10.9 UTC
Ecliptic Conjunction	2000 July 1 at 19:20:59.0 UTC
Equatorial Conjunction	2000 July 1 at 19:31:09.1 UTC
Greatest Eclipse	2000 July 1 at 19:33:33.8 UTC
Last Penumbral External Contact	2000 July 1 at 20:58:57.6 UTC

July 1, 2000 Solar Eclipse Parameters
Parameter	Value
Eclipse Magnitude	0.47678
Eclipse Obscuration	0.37185
Gamma	−1.28214
Sun Right Ascension	06h44m34.3s
Sun Declination	+23°02'33.1"
Sun Semi-Diameter	15'43.8"
Sun Equatorial Horizontal Parallax	08.6"
Moon Right Ascension	06h44m40.5s
Moon Declination	+21°44'04.7"
Moon Semi-Diameter	16'43.1"
Moon Equatorial Horizontal Parallax	1°01'21.5"
ΔT	63.9 s

== Eclipse season ==
This eclipse is part of an eclipse season, a period, roughly every six months, when eclipses occur. Only two (or occasionally three) eclipse seasons occur each year, and each season lasts about 35 days and repeats just short of six months (173 days) later; thus two full eclipse seasons always occur each year. Either two or three eclipses happen each eclipse season. In the sequence below, each eclipse is separated by a fortnight. The first and last eclipse in this sequence is separated by one synodic month.

Eclipse season of July 2000
July 1 Ascending node (new moon)	July 16 Descending node (full moon)	July 31 Ascending node (new moon)
Partial solar eclipse Solar Saros 117	Total lunar eclipse Lunar Saros 129	Partial solar eclipse Solar Saros 155

== Related eclipses ==
=== Eclipses in 2000 ===
- A total lunar eclipse on January 21.
- A partial solar eclipse on February 5.
- A partial solar eclipse on July 1.
- A total lunar eclipse on July 16.
- A partial solar eclipse on July 31.
- A partial solar eclipse on December 25.

=== Metonic ===
- Followed by: Solar eclipse of April 19, 2004

=== Tzolkinex ===
- Preceded by: Solar eclipse of May 21, 1993

=== Half-Saros ===
- Preceded by: Lunar eclipse of June 27, 1991
- Followed by: Lunar eclipse of July 7, 2009

=== Tritos ===
- Followed by: Solar eclipse of June 1, 2011

=== Solar Saros 117 ===
- Preceded by: Solar eclipse of June 21, 1982
- Followed by: Solar eclipse of July 13, 2018

=== Inex ===
- Preceded by: Solar eclipse of July 22, 1971
- Followed by: Solar eclipse of June 12, 2029

=== Triad ===
- Preceded by: Solar eclipse of August 31, 1913
- Followed by: Solar eclipse of May 2, 2087

=== Solar eclipses of 2000–2003 ===
This eclipse is a member of a semester series. An eclipse in a semester series of solar eclipses repeats approximately every 177 days and 4 hours (a semester) at alternating nodes of the Moon's orbit.

The partial solar eclipses on February 5, 2000 and July 31, 2000 occur in the previous lunar year eclipse set.

Solar eclipse series sets from 2000 to 2003
Ascending node			Descending node		
Saros	Map	Gamma	Saros	Map	Gamma
117	July 1, 2000 Partial	−1.28214	122 Partial projection in Minneapolis, MN, USA	December 25, 2000 Partial	1.13669
127 Totality in Lusaka, Zambia	June 21, 2001 Total	−0.57013	132 Partial in Minneapolis, MN, USA	December 14, 2001 Annular	0.40885
137 Partial in Los Angeles, CA, USA	June 10, 2002 Annular	0.19933	142 Totality in Woomera, South Australia	December 4, 2002 Total	−0.30204
147 Annularity in Culloden, Scotland	May 31, 2003 Annular	0.99598	152	November 23, 2003 Total	−0.96381

=== Saros 117 ===
This eclipse is a part of Saros series 117, repeating every 18 years, 11 days, and containing 71 events. The series started with a partial solar eclipse on June 24, 792 AD. It contains annular eclipses from September 18, 936 AD through May 14, 1333; hybrid eclipses from May 25, 1351 through July 8, 1423; and total eclipses from July 18, 1441 through May 19, 1928. The series ends at member 71 as a partial eclipse on August 3, 2054. Its eclipses are tabulated in three columns; every third eclipse in the same column is one exeligmos apart, so they all cast shadows over approximately the same parts of the Earth.

The longest duration of annularity was produced by member 16 at 9 minutes, 26 seconds on December 3, 1062, and the longest duration of totality was produced by member 62 at 4 minutes, 19 seconds on April 26, 1892. All eclipses in this series occur at the Moon’s ascending node of orbit.

Series members 57–71 occur between 1801 and 2054:
57	58	59
March 4, 1802	March 14, 1820	March 25, 1838
60	61	62
April 5, 1856	April 16, 1874	April 26, 1892
63	64	65
May 9, 1910	May 19, 1928	May 30, 1946
66	67	68
June 10, 1964	June 21, 1982	July 1, 2000
69	70	71
July 13, 2018	July 23, 2036	August 3, 2054

=== Metonic series ===
The metonic series repeats eclipses every 19 years (6939.69 days), lasting about 5 cycles. Eclipses occur in nearly the same calendar date. In addition, the octon subseries repeats 1/5 of that or every 3.8 years (1387.94 days). All eclipses in this table occur at the Moon's ascending node.

21 eclipse events between July 1, 2000 and July 1, 2076
July 1–2	April 19–20	February 5–7	November 24–25	September 12–13
117	119	121	123	125
July 1, 2000	April 19, 2004	February 7, 2008	November 25, 2011	September 13, 2015
127	129	131	133	135
July 2, 2019	April 20, 2023	February 6, 2027	November 25, 2030	September 12, 2034
137	139	141	143	145
July 2, 2038	April 20, 2042	February 5, 2046	November 25, 2049	September 12, 2053
147	149	151	153	155
July 1, 2057	April 20, 2061	February 5, 2065	November 24, 2068	September 12, 2072
157
July 1, 2076

=== Tritos series ===
This eclipse is a part of a tritos cycle, repeating at alternating nodes every 135 synodic months (≈ 3986.63 days, or 11 years minus 1 month). Their appearance and longitude are irregular due to a lack of synchronization with the anomalistic month (period of perigee), but groupings of 3 tritos cycles (≈ 33 years minus 3 months) come close (≈ 434.044 anomalistic months), so eclipses are similar in these groupings.

The partial solar eclipses on April 8, 1902 (part of Saros 108) and January 5, 1935 (part of Saros 111) are also a part of this series but are not included in the table below.

Series members between 2000 and 2200
July 1, 2000 (Saros 117)	June 1, 2011 (Saros 118)	April 30, 2022 (Saros 119)	March 30, 2033 (Saros 120)	February 28, 2044 (Saros 121)
January 27, 2055 (Saros 122)	December 27, 2065 (Saros 123)	November 26, 2076 (Saros 124)	October 26, 2087 (Saros 125)	September 25, 2098 (Saros 126)
August 26, 2109 (Saros 127)	July 25, 2120 (Saros 128)	June 25, 2131 (Saros 129)	May 25, 2142 (Saros 130)	April 23, 2153 (Saros 131)
March 23, 2164 (Saros 132)	February 21, 2175 (Saros 133)	January 20, 2186 (Saros 134)	December 19, 2196 (Saros 135)	

=== Inex series ===
This eclipse is a part of the long period inex cycle, repeating at alternating nodes, every 358 synodic months (≈ 10,571.95 days, or 29 years minus 20 days). Their appearance and longitude are irregular due to a lack of synchronization with the anomalistic month (period of perigee). However, groupings of 3 inex cycles (≈ 87 years minus 2 months) comes close (≈ 1,151.02 anomalistic months), so eclipses are similar in these groupings.

Series members between 1801 and 2200
October 31, 1826 (Saros 111)		
August 31, 1913 (Saros 114)	August 12, 1942 (Saros 115)	July 22, 1971 (Saros 116)
July 1, 2000 (Saros 117)	June 12, 2029 (Saros 118)	May 22, 2058 (Saros 119)
May 2, 2087 (Saros 120)	April 13, 2116 (Saros 121)	March 23, 2145 (Saros 122)
March 3, 2174 (Saros 123)		
