= Solar eclipse of January 6, 2019 =

21st-century partial solar eclipse

- Partial eclipse
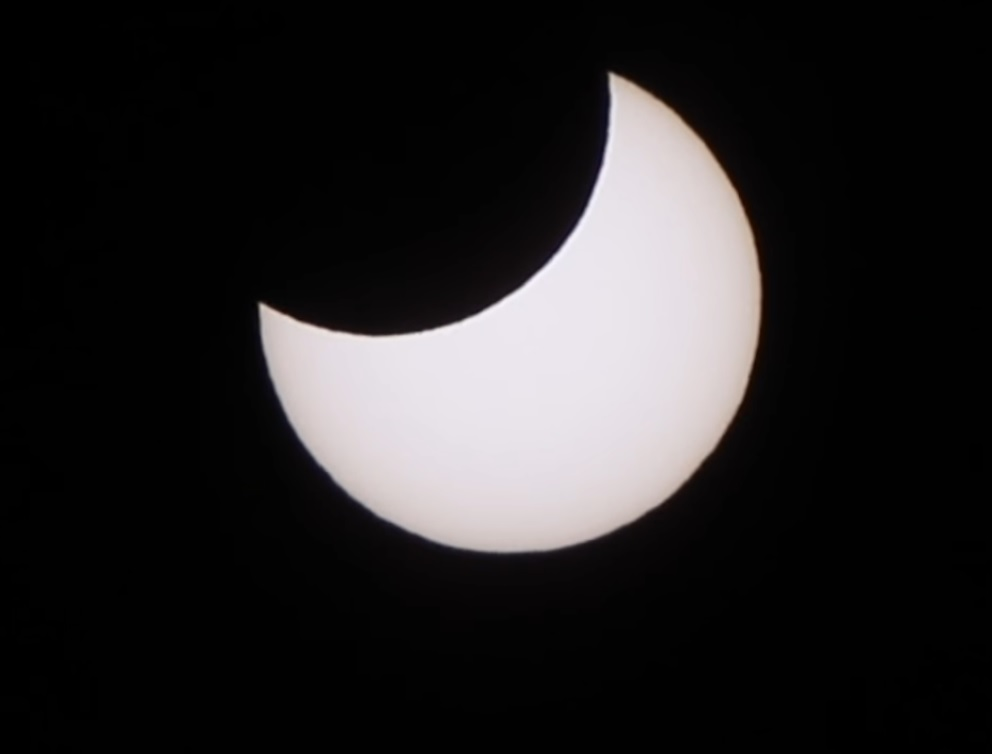
- From Nakhodka, Russia

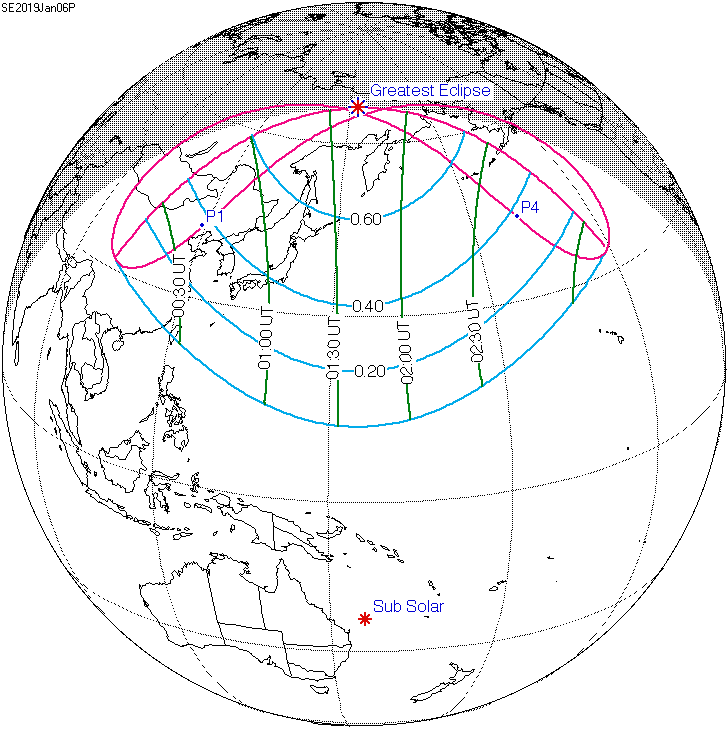
- Map
- Gamma: 1.1417
- Magnitude: 0.7145

Maximum eclipse
- Coordinates: 67.4°N 153.6°E

Times (UTC)
- Greatest eclipse: 1:42:38

References
- Saros: 122 (58 of 70)
- Catalog # (SE5000): 9550

A partial solar eclipse occurred at the Moon's descending node of orbit between Saturday, January 5 and Sunday, January 6, 2019, with a magnitude of 0.7145. A solar eclipse occurs when the Moon passes between Earth and the Sun, thereby totally or partly obscuring the image of the Sun for a viewer on Earth. A partial solar eclipse occurs in the polar regions of the Earth when the center of the Moon's shadow misses the Earth.

The eclipse was visible in Northeast Asia and southwestern Alaska.

== Visibility ==
Animated path.

The maximal phase (71%) of the partial eclipse was recorded in Sakha Republic (Russia).

The eclipse was observed in Japan, the Russian Far East, North and South Korea, eastern China, eastern Mongolia and northwest Alaska.

== Eclipse timing ==
=== Places experiencing partial eclipse ===
Solar Eclipse of January 6, 2019 (Local Times)
Country or territory	City or place	Start of partial eclipse	Maximum eclipse	End of partial eclipse	Duration of eclipse (hr:min)	Maximum coverage
Taiwan	Taipei	08:00:22	08:29:51	09:01:13	1:01	1.46%
China	Suzhou	07:41:41	08:31:58	09:27:36	1:46	8.91%
China	Shanghai	07:41:29	08:32:59	09:30:04	1:49	9.40%
China	Beijing	07:36:15 (sunrise)	08:34:32	09:41:16	2:05	19.72%
North Korea	Pyongyang	08:35:03	09:44:31	11:02:35	2:28	25.70%
South Korea	Seoul	08:35:39	09:45:00	11:03:00	2:27	24.18%
Mongolia	Ulaanbaatar	08:41:18 (sunrise)	08:45:12	09:42:10	1:01	24.79%
South Korea	Daegu	08:36:43	09:46:02	11:04:02	2:27	22.47%
Russia	Chita	09:33:15 (sunrise)	09:46:36	11:00:59	1:28	36.91%
Japan	Kobe	08:40:25	09:56:36	11:21:45	2:41	25.39%
Russia	Vladivostok	09:38:25	10:57:08	12:24:32	2:46	36.89%
Japan	Osaka	08:40:38	09:57:13	11:22:43	2:42	25.60%
Japan	Kyoto	08:40:41	09:57:53	11:24:01	2:43	26.33%
Japan	Nagoya	08:41:29	10:00:09	11:27:39	2:46	27.34%
Japan	Yokohama	08:43:45	10:05:39	11:35:54	2:52	29.47%
Japan	Tokyo	08:43:49	10:06:01	11:36:33	2:53	29.93%
Russia	Komsomolsk-on-Amur	09:47:40	11:11:37	12:41:58	2:54	49.79%
Japan	Sapporo	08:46:32	10:13:29	11:47:24	3:01	42.26%
Russia	Yakutsk	09:40:20 (sunrise)	10:14:19	11:36:32	1:56	56.31%
Russia	Irkutsk	09:11:23 (sunrise)	09:15:51	09:48:10	0:37	16.72%
Russia	Yuzhno-Sakhalinsk	10:50:26	12:18:29	13:52:13	3:02	48.01%
Russia	Magadan	11:11:00	12:36:58	14:04:05	2:53	60.25%
Russia	Srednekolymsk	11:44:50 (sunrise)	12:41:38	13:56:59 (sunset)	2:12	62.05%
Russia	Petropavlovsk-Kamchatsky	12:16:57	13:48:19	15:18:28	3:02	55.83%
Russia	Anadyr	12:44:32	14:05:43	14:25:56 (sunset)	1:41	57.55%
United States Minor Outlying Islands	Wake Island	13:13:25	14:09:34	15:02:41	1:49	4.43%
Russia	Verkhoyansk	12:09:39 (sunrise)	12:25:13	12:43:10	0:34	9.80%
United States	Adak (Note: The times listed for this location occur on January 5, 2019, local time.)	15:01:49	16:25:35	17:42:21	2:41	43.95%
United States	Unalaska	16:16:45	17:33:24	18:00:27 (sunset)	1:44	39.59%
United States Minor Outlying Islands	Midway Atoll	14:44:32	15:42:09	16:34:22	1:50	7.60%

== Gallery ==
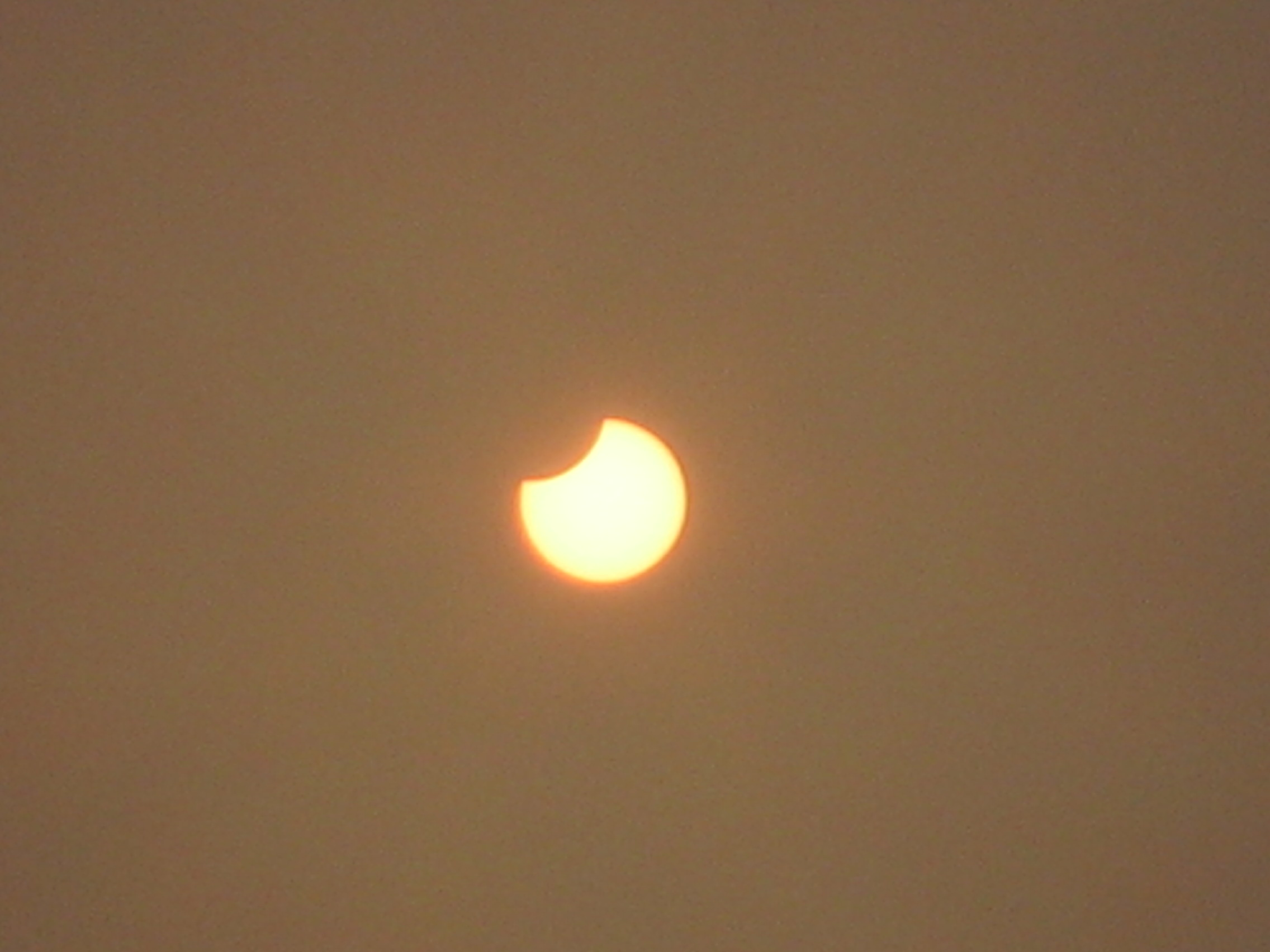
Jinan, China, 00:18 UTC

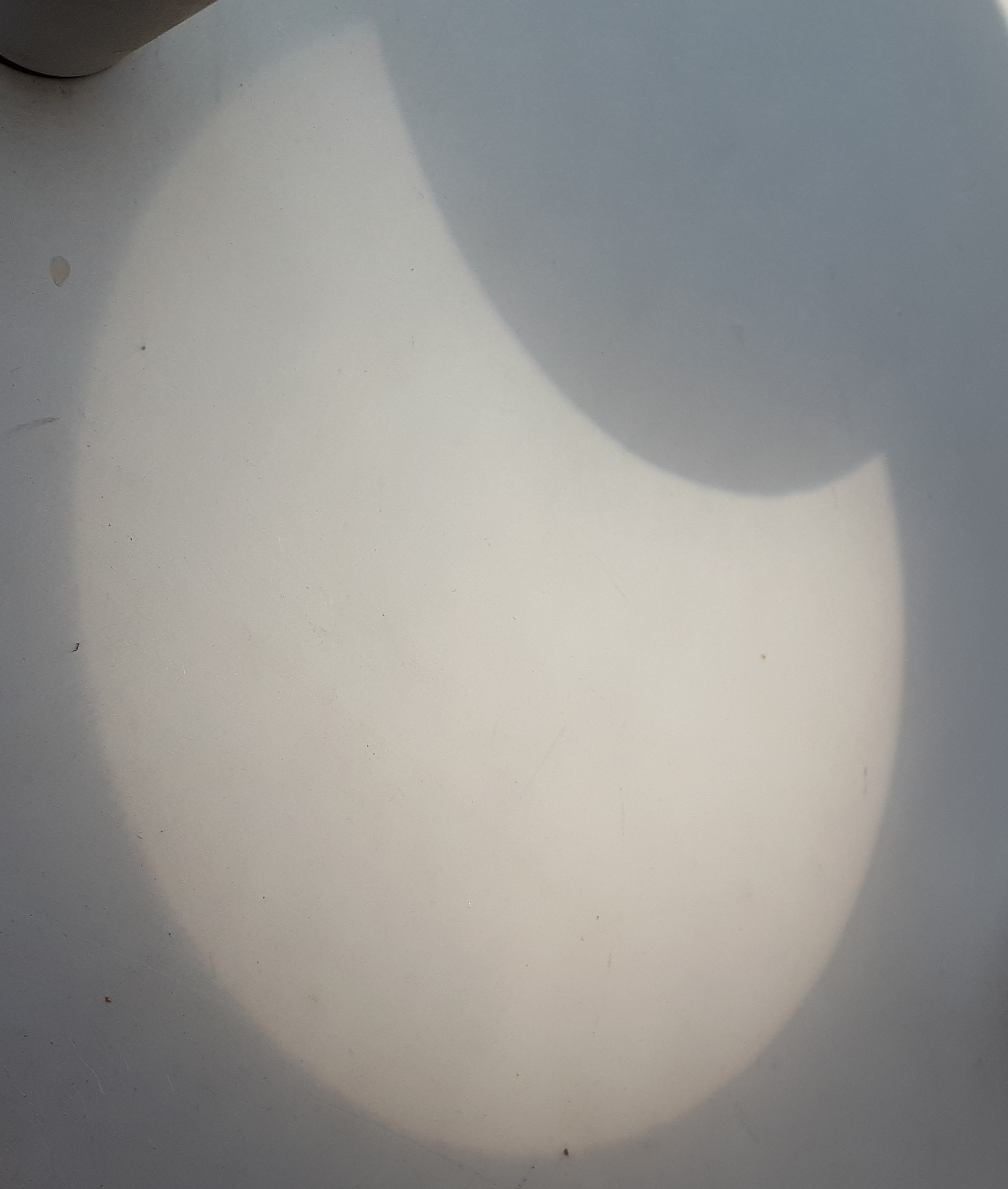
Bohyeonsan, South Korea, 00:47 UTC

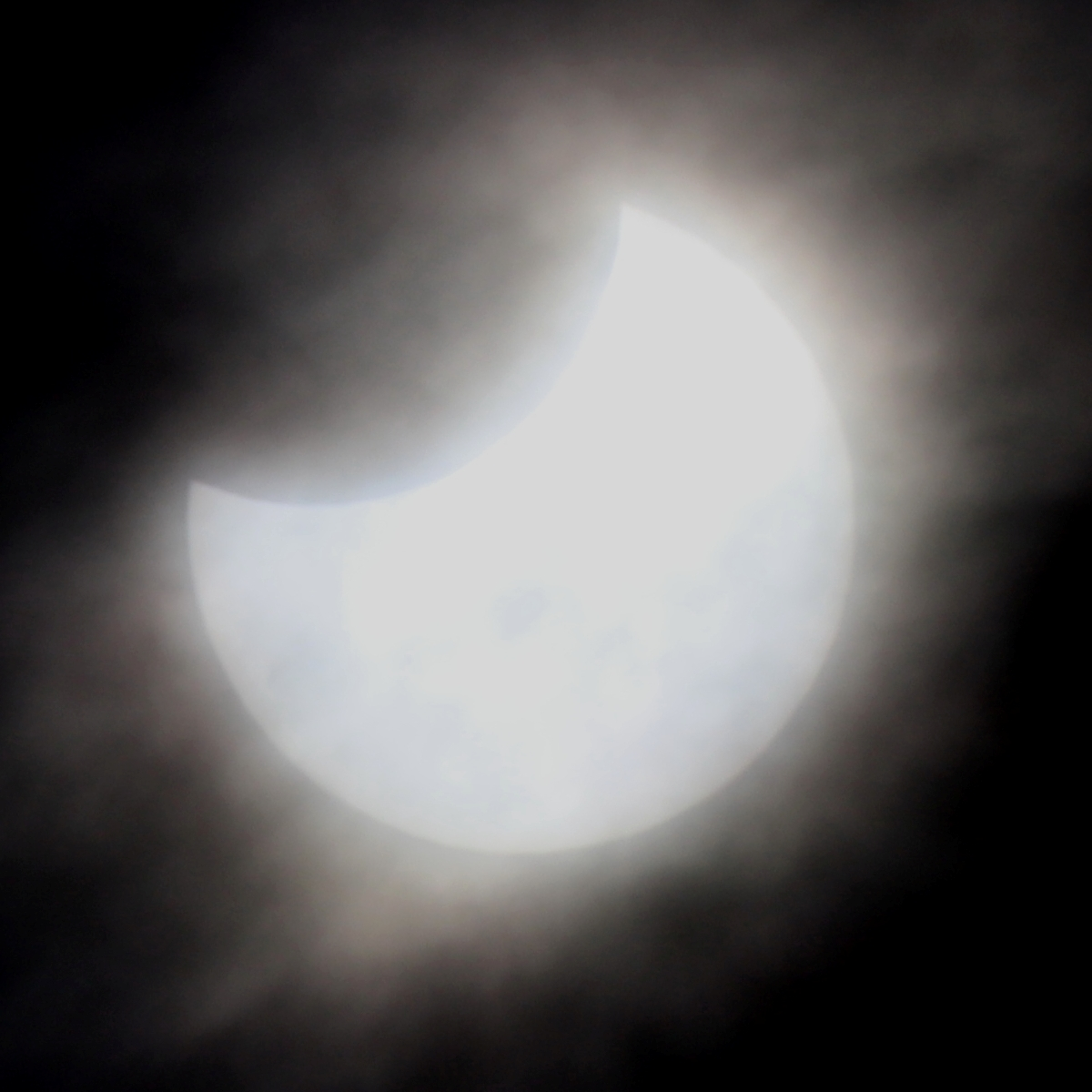
Aichi Prefecture, Japan, 01:00 UTC

== Eclipse details ==
Shown below are two tables displaying details about this particular solar eclipse. The first table outlines times at which the Moon's penumbra or umbra attains the specific parameter, and the second table describes various other parameters pertaining to this eclipse.

January 6, 2019 Solar Eclipse Times
Event	Time (UTC)
First Penumbral External Contact	2019 January 05 at 23:35:18.0 UTC
Ecliptic Conjunction	2019 January 06 at 01:29:20.4 UTC
Greatest Eclipse	2019 January 06 at 01:42:37.7 UTC
Equatorial Conjunction	2019 January 06 at 01:44:50.7 UTC
Last Penumbral External Contact	2019 January 06 at 03:49:59.7 UTC

January 6, 2019 Solar Eclipse Parameters
Parameter	Value
Eclipse Magnitude	0.71455
Eclipse Obscuration	0.62003
Gamma	1.14174
Sun Right Ascension	19h06m57.4s
Sun Declination	-22°32'36.6"
Sun Semi-Diameter	16'15.9"
Sun Equatorial Horizontal Parallax	08.9"
Moon Right Ascension	19h06m53.0s
Moon Declination	-21°30'36.4"
Moon Semi-Diameter	14'50.4"
Moon Equatorial Horizontal Parallax	0°54'27.6"
ΔT	69.4 s

== Eclipse season ==
This eclipse is part of an eclipse season, a period, roughly every six months, when eclipses occur. Only two (or occasionally three) eclipse seasons occur each year, and each season lasts about 35 days and repeats just short of six months (173 days) later; thus two full eclipse seasons always occur each year. Either two or three eclipses happen each eclipse season. In the sequence below, each eclipse is separated by a fortnight.

Eclipse season of January 2019
January 6 Descending node (new moon)	January 21 Ascending node (full moon)
Partial solar eclipse Solar Saros 122	Total lunar eclipse Lunar Saros 134

== Related eclipses ==
=== Eclipses in 2019 ===
- A partial solar eclipse on January 6.
- A total lunar eclipse on January 21.
- A total solar eclipse on July 2.
- A partial lunar eclipse on July 16.
- An annular solar eclipse on December 26.

=== Metonic ===
- Preceded by: Solar eclipse of March 20, 2015
- Followed by: Solar eclipse of October 25, 2022

=== Tzolkinex ===
- Preceded by: Solar eclipse of November 25, 2011
- Followed by: Solar eclipse of February 17, 2026

=== Half-Saros ===
- Preceded by: Lunar eclipse of December 31, 2009
- Followed by: Lunar eclipse of January 12, 2028

=== Tritos ===
- Preceded by: Solar eclipse of February 7, 2008
- Followed by: Solar eclipse of December 5, 2029

=== Solar Saros 122 ===
- Preceded by: Solar eclipse of December 25, 2000
- Followed by: Solar eclipse of January 16, 2037

=== Inex ===
- Preceded by: Solar eclipse of January 26, 1990
- Followed by: Solar eclipse of December 16, 2047

=== Triad ===
- Preceded by: Solar eclipse of March 7, 1932
- Followed by: Solar eclipse of November 6, 2105

=== Solar eclipses of 2018–2021 ===
This eclipse is a member of a semester series. An eclipse in a semester series of solar eclipses repeats approximately every 177 days and 4 hours (a semester) at alternating nodes of the Moon's orbit.

The partial solar eclipses on February 15, 2018 and August 11, 2018 occur in the previous lunar year eclipse set.

Solar eclipse series sets from 2018 to 2021
Ascending node			Descending node		
Saros	Map	Gamma	Saros	Map	Gamma
117 Partial in Melbourne, Australia	July 13, 2018 Partial	−1.35423	122 Partial in Nakhodka, Russia	January 6, 2019 Partial	1.14174
127 Totality in La Serena, Chile	July 2, 2019 Total	−0.64656	132 Annularity in Jaffna, Sri Lanka	December 26, 2019 Annular	0.41351
137 Annularity in Beigang, Yunlin, Taiwan	June 21, 2020 Annular	0.12090	142 Totality in Gorbea, Chile	December 14, 2020 Total	−0.29394
147 Partial in Halifax, Canada	June 10, 2021 Annular	0.91516	152 From HMS Protector off South Georgia	December 4, 2021 Total	−0.95261

=== Saros 122 ===
This eclipse is a part of Saros series 122, repeating every 18 years, 11 days, and containing 70 events. The series started with a partial solar eclipse on April 17, 991 AD. It contains total eclipses from July 12, 1135 through August 3, 1171; hybrid eclipses on August 13, 1189 and August 25, 1207; and annular eclipses from September 4, 1225 through October 10, 1874. The series ends at member 70 as a partial eclipse on May 17, 2235. Its eclipses are tabulated in three columns; every third eclipse in the same column is one exeligmos apart, so they all cast shadows over approximately the same parts of the Earth.

The longest duration of totality was produced by member 9 at 1 minutes, 25 seconds on July 12, 1135, and the longest duration of annularity was produced by member 50 at 6 minutes, 28 seconds on October 10, 1874. All eclipses in this series occur at the Moon’s descending node of orbit.

Series members 46–68 occur between 1801 and 2200:
46	47	48
August 28, 1802	September 7, 1820	September 18, 1838
49	50	51
September 29, 1856	October 10, 1874	October 20, 1892
52	53	54
November 2, 1910	November 12, 1928	November 23, 1946
55	56	57
December 4, 1964	December 15, 1982	December 25, 2000
58	59	60
January 6, 2019	January 16, 2037	January 27, 2055
61	62	63
February 7, 2073	February 18, 2091	March 1, 2109
64	65	66
March 13, 2127	March 23, 2145	April 3, 2163
67	68	
April 14, 2181	April 25, 2199	

=== Metonic series ===
The metonic series repeats eclipses every 19 years (6939.69 days), lasting about 5 cycles. Eclipses occur in nearly the same calendar date. In addition, the octon subseries repeats 1/5 of that or every 3.8 years (1387.94 days). All eclipses in this table occur at the Moon's descending node.

22 eclipse events between June 1, 2011 and October 24, 2098
May 31–June 1	March 19–20	January 5–6	October 24–25	August 12–13
118	120	122	124	126
June 1, 2011	March 20, 2015	January 6, 2019	October 25, 2022	August 12, 2026
128	130	132	134	136
June 1, 2030	March 20, 2034	January 5, 2038	October 25, 2041	August 12, 2045
138	140	142	144	146
May 31, 2049	March 20, 2053	January 5, 2057	October 24, 2060	August 12, 2064
148	150	152	154	156
May 31, 2068	March 19, 2072	January 6, 2076	October 24, 2079	August 13, 2083
158	160	162	164	
June 1, 2087			October 24, 2098	

=== Tritos series ===
This eclipse is a part of a tritos cycle, repeating at alternating nodes every 135 synodic months (≈ 3986.63 days, or 11 years minus 1 month). Their appearance and longitude are irregular due to a lack of synchronization with the anomalistic month (period of perigee), but groupings of 3 tritos cycles (≈ 33 years minus 3 months) come close (≈ 434.044 anomalistic months), so eclipses are similar in these groupings.

Series members between 1866 and 2200
March 16, 1866 (Saros 108)			December 13, 1898 (Saros 111)	
	September 12, 1931 (Saros 114)	August 12, 1942 (Saros 115)	July 11, 1953 (Saros 116)	June 10, 1964 (Saros 117)
May 11, 1975 (Saros 118)	April 9, 1986 (Saros 119)	March 9, 1997 (Saros 120)	February 7, 2008 (Saros 121)	January 6, 2019 (Saros 122)
December 5, 2029 (Saros 123)	November 4, 2040 (Saros 124)	October 4, 2051 (Saros 125)	September 3, 2062 (Saros 126)	August 3, 2073 (Saros 127)
July 3, 2084 (Saros 128)	June 2, 2095 (Saros 129)	May 3, 2106 (Saros 130)	April 2, 2117 (Saros 131)	March 1, 2128 (Saros 132)
January 30, 2139 (Saros 133)	December 30, 2149 (Saros 134)	November 27, 2160 (Saros 135)	October 29, 2171 (Saros 136)	September 27, 2182 (Saros 137)
August 26, 2193 (Saros 138)

=== Inex series ===
This eclipse is a part of the long period inex cycle, repeating at alternating nodes, every 358 synodic months (≈ 10,571.95 days, or 29 years minus 20 days). Their appearance and longitude are irregular due to a lack of synchronization with the anomalistic month (period of perigee). However, groupings of 3 inex cycles (≈ 87 years minus 2 months) comes close (≈ 1,151.02 anomalistic months), so eclipses are similar in these groupings.

Series members between 1801 and 2200
May 27, 1816 (Saros 115)	May 6, 1845 (Saros 116)	April 16, 1874 (Saros 117)
March 29, 1903 (Saros 118)	March 7, 1932 (Saros 119)	February 15, 1961 (Saros 120)
January 26, 1990 (Saros 121)	January 6, 2019 (Saros 122)	December 16, 2047 (Saros 123)
November 26, 2076 (Saros 124)	November 6, 2105 (Saros 125)	October 17, 2134 (Saros 126)
September 28, 2163 (Saros 127)	September 6, 2192 (Saros 128)	
