= Solar eclipse of July 31, 2000 =

20th-century partial solar eclipse

- Partial eclipse
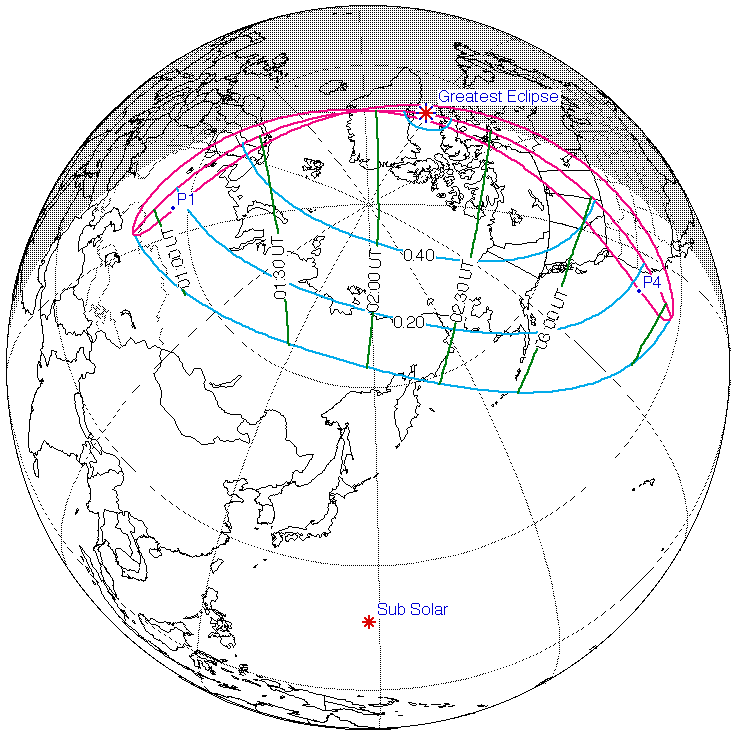
- Map
- Gamma: 1.2166
- Magnitude: 0.6034

Maximum eclipse
- Coordinates: 69.5°N 59.9°W

Times (UTC)
- Greatest eclipse: 2:14:08

References
- Saros: 155 (5 of 71)
- Catalog # (SE5000): 9508

External image
- https://eclipseguy.com/reports/the-arctic-31-july-2000/

A partial solar eclipse occurred at the Moon’s ascending node of orbit between Sunday, July 30 and Monday, July 31, 2000, with a magnitude of 0.6034. A solar eclipse occurs when the Moon passes between Earth and the Sun, thereby totally or partly obscuring the image of the Sun for a viewer on Earth. A partial solar eclipse occurs in the polar regions of the Earth when the center of the Moon's shadow misses the Earth.

This was the third of four partial solar eclipses in 2000, with the others occurring on February 5, July 1, and December 25.

A partial eclipse was visible for parts of northern Russia, northeastern Scandinavia, Alaska, western Canada, Greenland, and the western United States.

== Images ==
Animated path

== Eclipse timing ==
=== Places experiencing partial eclipse ===
Solar Eclipse of July 31, 2000 (Local Times)
Country or territory	City or place	Start of partial eclipse	Maximum eclipse	End of partial eclipse	Duration of eclipse (hr:min)	Maximum coverage
Russia	Samara	05:54:53 (sunrise)	05:59:51	06:21:46	0:27	4.05%
Russia	Yekaterinburg	06:38:52	07:01:06	07:23:50	0:45	3.89%
Kazakhstan	Oral	05:57:54 (sunrise)	06:01:48	06:13:56	0:16	1.62%
Russia	Izhevsk	05:37:32	06:03:14	06:29:32	0:52	6.70%
Russia	Belushya Guba	04:45:40	05:24:48	06:04:49	1:19	23.75%
Russia	Murmansk	04:46:42	05:25:54	06:05:55	1:19	28.59%
Finland	Rovaniemi	03:52:31 (sunrise)	04:25:55	05:05:14	1:13	29.45%
Sweden	Kiruna	02:52:43 (sunrise)	03:29:47	04:10:04	1:17	32.82%
Norway	Tromsø	02:51:42	03:32:08	04:13:14	1:22	34.58%
Russia	Moscow	05:33:03 (sunrise)	05:38:31	05:38:45	0:06	0.02%
Svalbard and Jan Mayen	Longyearbyen	02:58:46	03:42:21	04:26:25	1:28	39.18%
Greenland	Danmarkshavn	01:08:19	01:52:28	02:36:48	1:28	46.42%
Greenland	Pituffik (Note: The times listed for this location occur on July 30, 2000, local time.)	22:25:16	23:11:00	23:56:17	1:31	49.80%
Canada	Pond Inlet	20:32:52	21:18:16	22:03:02	1:30	50.37%
Canada	Resolute	20:34:34	21:20:57	22:06:31	1:32	47.43%
Russia	Anadyr	14:52:15	15:27:10	16:01:23	1:09	7.66%
Canada	Coral Harbour	20:46:28	21:30:07	21:41:05 (sunset)	0:55	48.77%
Canada	Baker Lake	20:51:34	21:35:52	22:19:04	1:28	46.00%
Canada	Inuvik	19:51:24	20:37:24	21:21:58	1:31	33.88%
Canada	Regina	20:18:36	20:40:54	20:44:43 (sunset)	0:26	21.40%
United States	Salt Lake City	20:41:35	20:43:06	20:44:38 (sunset)	0:03	0.37%
United States	Anchorage	18:07:36	18:49:19	19:29:30	1:22	19.49%
Canada	Whitehorse	19:08:05	19:51:23	20:33:03	1:25	27.30%
United States	Juneau	18:13:29	18:55:38	19:36:10	1:23	25.34%
United States	Unalaska	18:32:10	18:57:08	19:21:26	0:49	2.90%
Canada	Edmonton	20:17:19	20:58:02	21:32:38 (sunset)	1:15	31.28%
Canada	Calgary	20:22:23	21:01:44	21:24:45 (sunset)	1:02	28.21%
Canada	Vancouver	19:30:12	20:07:50	20:44:02	1:14	21.61%
United States	Seattle	19:33:27	20:09:56	20:45:02	1:12	19.95%
United States	San Francisco	19:56:52	20:15:06	20:19:40 (sunset)	0:23	6.21%

== Eclipse details ==
Shown below are two tables displaying details about this particular solar eclipse. The first table outlines times at which the Moon's penumbra or umbra attains the specific parameter, and the second table describes various other parameters pertaining to this eclipse.

July 31, 2000 Solar Eclipse Times
Event	Time (UTC)
First Penumbral External Contact	2000 July 31 at 00:38:31.2 UTC
Equatorial Conjunction	2000 July 31 at 01:53:07.4 UTC
Greatest Eclipse	2000 July 31 at 02:14:07.7 UTC
Ecliptic Conjunction	2000 July 31 at 02:26:13.1 UTC
Last Penumbral External Contact	2000 July 31 at 03:49:55.6 UTC

July 31, 2000 Solar Eclipse Parameters
Parameter	Value
Eclipse Magnitude	0.60337
Eclipse Obscuration	0.51669
Gamma	1.21664
Sun Right Ascension	08h42m24.7s
Sun Declination	+18°13'08.6"
Sun Semi-Diameter	15'45.4"
Sun Equatorial Horizontal Parallax	08.7"
Moon Right Ascension	08h43m16.7s
Moon Declination	+19°26'16.2"
Moon Semi-Diameter	16'38.8"
Moon Equatorial Horizontal Parallax	1°01'05.5"
ΔT	63.9 s

== Eclipse season ==
This eclipse is part of an eclipse season, a period, roughly every six months, when eclipses occur. Only two (or occasionally three) eclipse seasons occur each year, and each season lasts about 35 days and repeats just short of six months (173 days) later; thus two full eclipse seasons always occur each year. Either two or three eclipses happen each eclipse season. In the sequence below, each eclipse is separated by a fortnight. The first and last eclipse in this sequence is separated by one synodic month.

Eclipse season of July 2000
July 1 Ascending node (new moon)	July 16 Descending node (full moon)	July 31 Ascending node (new moon)
Partial solar eclipse Solar Saros 117	Total lunar eclipse Lunar Saros 129	Partial solar eclipse Solar Saros 155

== Related eclipses ==
=== Eclipses in 2000 ===
- A total lunar eclipse on January 21.
- A partial solar eclipse on February 5.
- A partial solar eclipse on July 1.
- A total lunar eclipse on July 16.
- A partial solar eclipse on July 31.
- A partial solar eclipse on December 25.

=== Metonic ===
- Preceded by: Solar eclipse of October 12, 1996

=== Tzolkinex ===
- Followed by: Solar eclipse of September 11, 2007

=== Half-Saros ===
- Preceded by: Lunar eclipse of July 26, 1991
- Followed by: Lunar eclipse of August 6, 2009

=== Tritos ===
- Preceded by: Solar eclipse of August 31, 1989
- Followed by: Solar eclipse of July 1, 2011

=== Solar Saros 155 ===
- Preceded by: Solar eclipse of July 20, 1982
- Followed by: Solar eclipse of August 11, 2018

=== Inex ===
- Preceded by: Solar eclipse of August 20, 1971
- Followed by: Solar eclipse of July 11, 2029

=== Triad ===
- Preceded by: Solar eclipse of September 30, 1913
- Followed by: Solar eclipse of June 1, 2087

=== Solar eclipses of 1997–2000 ===
This eclipse is a member of a semester series. An eclipse in a semester series of solar eclipses repeats approximately every 177 days and 4 hours (a semester) at alternating nodes of the Moon's orbit.

The partial solar eclipses on July 1, 2000 and December 25, 2000 occur in the next lunar year eclipse set.

Solar eclipse series sets from 1997 to 2000
Descending node			Ascending node		
Saros	Map	Gamma	Saros	Map	Gamma
120 Totality in Chita, Russia	March 9, 1997 Total	0.9183	125	September 2, 1997 Partial	−1.0352
130 Totality near Guadeloupe	February 26, 1998 Total	0.2391	135	August 22, 1998 Annular	−0.2644
140	February 16, 1999 Annular	−0.4726	145 Totality in France	August 11, 1999 Total	0.5062
150	February 5, 2000 Partial	−1.2233	155	July 31, 2000 Partial	1.2166

=== Saros 155 ===
This eclipse is a part of Saros series 155, repeating every 18 years, 11 days, and containing 71 events. The series started with a partial solar eclipse on June 17, 1928. It contains total eclipses from September 12, 2072 through August 30, 2649; hybrid eclipses from September 10, 2667 through October 2, 2703; and annular eclipses from October 13, 2721 through May 8, 3064. The series ends at member 71 as a partial eclipse on July 24, 3190. Its eclipses are tabulated in three columns; every third eclipse in the same column is one exeligmos apart, so they all cast shadows over approximately the same parts of the Earth.

The longest duration of totality will be produced by member 14 at 4 minutes, 5 seconds on November 6, 2162, and the longest duration of annularity will be produced by member 63 at 5 minutes, 31 seconds on April 28, 3046. All eclipses in this series occur at the Moon’s ascending node of orbit.

Series members 1–16 occur between 1928 and 2200:
1	2	3
June 17, 1928	June 29, 1946	July 9, 1964
4	5	6
July 20, 1982	July 31, 2000	August 11, 2018
7	8	9
August 21, 2036	September 1–2, 2054	September 12, 2072
10	11	12
September 23, 2090	October 4–5, 2108	October 16, 2126
13	14	15
October 26, 2144	November 6–7, 2162	November 17, 2180
16
November 28, 2198

=== Metonic series ===
The metonic series repeats eclipses every 19 years (6939.69 days), lasting about 5 cycles. Eclipses occur in nearly the same calendar date. In addition, the octon subseries repeats 1/5 of that or every 3.8 years (1387.94 days). All eclipses in this table occur at the Moon's ascending node.

22 eclipse events between December 24, 1916 and July 31, 2000
December 24–25	October 12	July 31–August 1	May 19–20	March 7
111	113	115	117	119
December 24, 1916		July 31, 1924	May 19, 1928	March 7, 1932
121	123	125	127	129
December 25, 1935	October 12, 1939	August 1, 1943	May 20, 1947	March 7, 1951
131	133	135	137	139
December 25, 1954	October 12, 1958	July 31, 1962	May 20, 1966	March 7, 1970
141	143	145	147	149
December 24, 1973	October 12, 1977	July 31, 1981	May 19, 1985	March 7, 1989
151	153	155		
December 24, 1992	October 12, 1996	July 31, 2000		

=== Tritos series ===
This eclipse is a part of a tritos cycle, repeating at alternating nodes every 135 synodic months (≈ 3986.63 days, or 11 years minus 1 month). Their appearance and longitude are irregular due to a lack of synchronization with the anomalistic month (period of perigee), but groupings of 3 tritos cycles (≈ 33 years minus 3 months) come close (≈ 434.044 anomalistic months), so eclipses are similar in these groupings.

The partial solar eclipse on October 24, 2098 (part of Saros 164) is also a part of this series but is not included in the table below.

Series members between 1801 and 2011
February 11, 1804 (Saros 137)	January 10, 1815 (Saros 138)	December 9, 1825 (Saros 139)	November 9, 1836 (Saros 140)	October 9, 1847 (Saros 141)
September 7, 1858 (Saros 142)	August 7, 1869 (Saros 143)	July 7, 1880 (Saros 144)	June 6, 1891 (Saros 145)	May 7, 1902 (Saros 146)
April 6, 1913 (Saros 147)	March 5, 1924 (Saros 148)	February 3, 1935 (Saros 149)	January 3, 1946 (Saros 150)	December 2, 1956 (Saros 151)
November 2, 1967 (Saros 152)	October 2, 1978 (Saros 153)	August 31, 1989 (Saros 154)	July 31, 2000 (Saros 155)	July 1, 2011 (Saros 156)

=== Inex series ===
This eclipse is a part of the long period inex cycle, repeating at alternating nodes, every 358 synodic months (≈ 10,571.95 days, or 29 years minus 20 days). Their appearance and longitude are irregular due to a lack of synchronization with the anomalistic month (period of perigee). However, groupings of 3 inex cycles (≈ 87 years minus 2 months) comes close (≈ 1,151.02 anomalistic months), so eclipses are similar in these groupings.

Series members between 1801 and 2200
November 29, 1826 (Saros 149)	November 9, 1855 (Saros 150)	October 19, 1884 (Saros 151)
September 30, 1913 (Saros 152)	September 10, 1942 (Saros 153)	August 20, 1971 (Saros 154)
July 31, 2000 (Saros 155)	July 11, 2029 (Saros 156)	June 21, 2058 (Saros 157)
June 1, 2087 (Saros 158)		
April 1, 2174 (Saros 161)		
