= Solar eclipse of February 17, 2026 =

Annular solar eclipse

- Annular eclipse
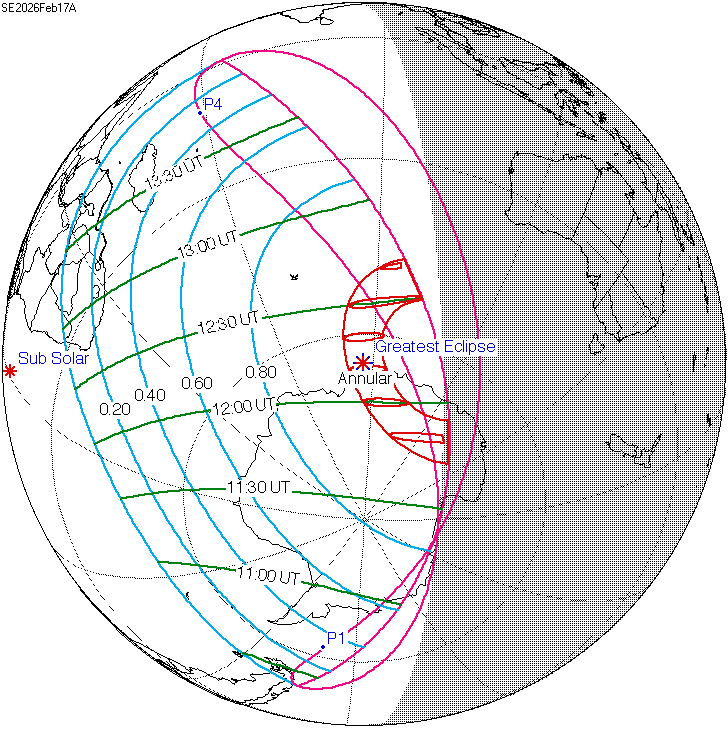
- Map
- Gamma: −0.9743
- Magnitude: 0.963

Maximum eclipse
- Duration: 140 s (2 min 20 s)
- Coordinates: 64.7°S 86.8°E
- Max. width of band: 616 km (383 mi)

Times (UTC)
- Greatest eclipse: 12:13:06

References
- Saros: 121 (61 of 71)
- Catalog # (SE5000): 9565

An annular solar eclipse occurred at the Moon’s ascending node of orbit on Tuesday, February 17, 2026, with a magnitude of 0.963. A solar eclipse occurs when the Moon passes between Earth and the Sun, thereby totally or partly obscuring the image of the Sun for a viewer on Earth. An annular solar eclipse occurs when the Moon's apparent diameter is smaller than the Sun's, blocking most of the Sun's light and causing the Sun to look like an annulus (ring). An annular eclipse appears as a partial eclipse over a region of the Earth thousands of kilometres wide. The Moon's apparent diameter was near the average diameter because it occurred 6.8 days after apogee (on February 10, 2026, at 16:50 UTC) and 7.5 days before perigee (on February 24, 2026, at 23:15 UTC).

Annularity was visible over Antarctica only. However, the partial eclipse was visible from the very southern tip of Argentina and Chile, as well as in much of southern Africa (including South Africa, Mozambique, and Madagascar).

== Images ==
Animated path

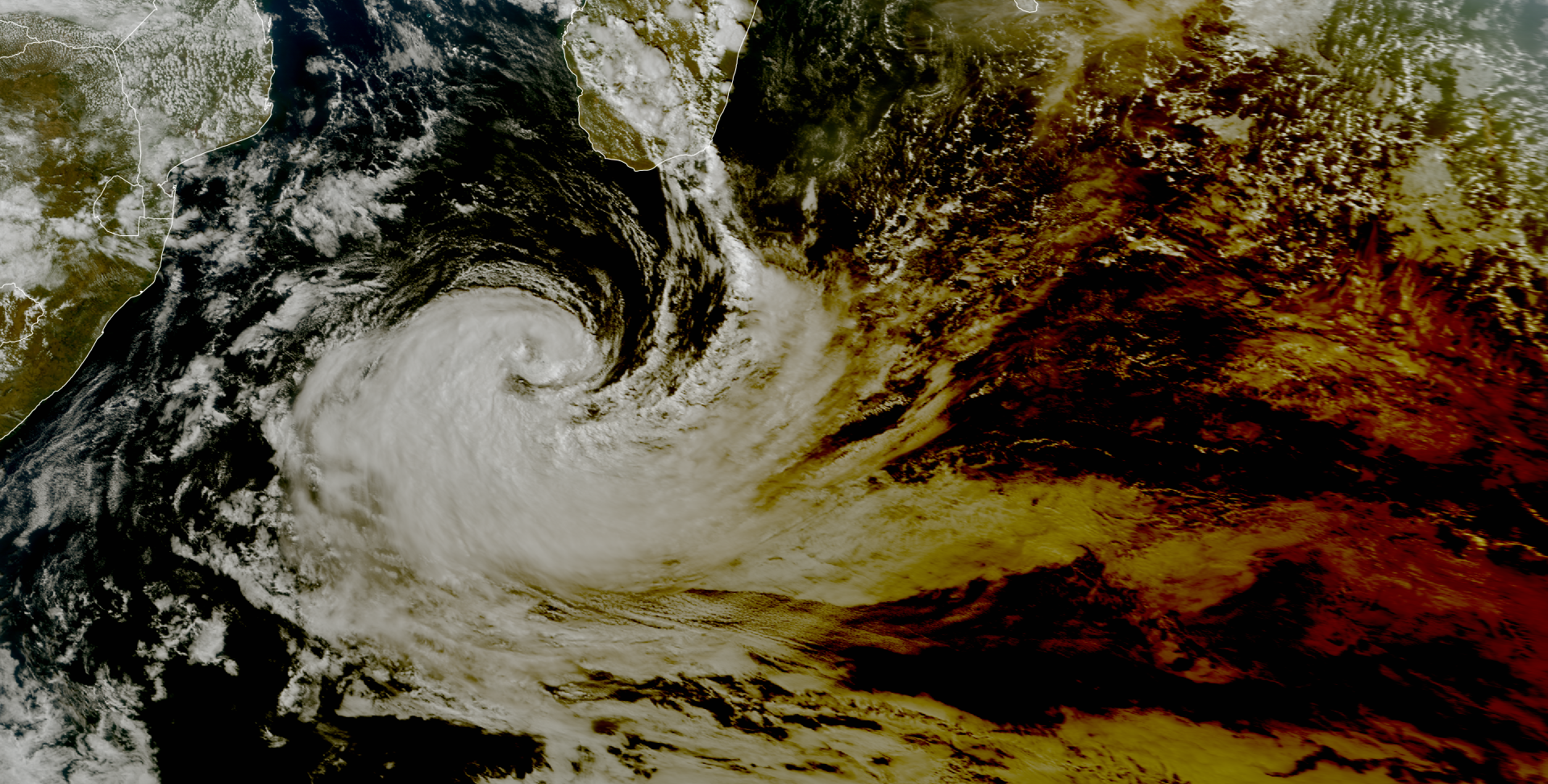
GeoColor satellite imagery of the eclipse nearby Cyclone Gezani at 13:10 UTC

== Eclipse timing ==
=== Places experiencing annular eclipse ===
Solar Eclipse of February 17, 2026 (Local Times)
| Country or territory | City or place | Start of partial eclipse | Start of annular eclipse | Maximum eclipse | End of annular eclipse | End of partial eclipse | Duration of annularity (min:s) | Duration of eclipse (hr:min) | Maximum coverage |
|---|---|---|---|---|---|---|---|---|---|
| Antarctica | Concordia Station | 18:48:14 | 19:46:35 | 19:47:37 | 19:48:40 | 20:45:42 | 2:05 | 1:57 | 92.46% |

=== Places experiencing partial eclipse ===
Solar Eclipse of February 17, 2026 (Local Times)
| Country or territory | City or place | Start of partial eclipse | Maximum eclipse | End of partial eclipse | Duration of eclipse (hr:min) | Maximum coverage |
|---|---|---|---|---|---|---|
| Chile | Punta Arenas | 07:07:16 | 07:28:52 | 07:51:03 | 0:44 | 1.81% |
| Antarctica | Marambio Base | 06:59:05 | 07:45:50 | 08:34:27 | 1:35 | 18.30% |
| Antarctica | Orcadas Base | 07:05:16 | 07:47:05 | 08:30:29 | 1:25 | 10.26% |
| South Georgia and the South Sandwich Islands | King Edward Point | 08:29:18 | 08:47:47 | 09:06:38 | 0:37 | 0.62% |
| Bouvet Island | Bouvet Island | 11:42:45 | 12:40:56 | 13:38:34 | 1:56 | 16.92% |
| Antarctica | Casey Station | 19:06:03 | 20:05:16 | 20:55:52 (sunset) | 1:50 | 91.29% |
| South Africa | Marion Island | 14:21:59 | 15:33:27 | 16:39:38 | 2:18 | 47.62% |
| French Southern and Antarctic Lands | Port-aux-Français | 16:35:21 | 17:41:35 | 18:43:00 | 2:08 | 83.57% |
| South Africa | Cape Town | 14:01:05 | 14:43:47 | 15:24:21 | 1:23 | 5.19% |
| South Africa | Gqeberha | 13:56:00 | 14:51:41 | 15:43:33 | 1:48 | 13.99% |
| French Southern and Antarctic Lands | Île Amsterdam | 17:01:14 | 18:02:48 | 18:45:30 (sunset) | 1:44 | 76.08% |
| Lesotho | Mafeteng | 14:11:34 | 15:02:49 | 15:50:32 | 1:39 | 11.14% |
| Lesotho | Maseru | 14:13:28 | 15:04:11 | 15:51:24 | 1:38 | 10.84% |
| Lesotho | Teyateyaneng | 14:13:59 | 15:04:47 | 15:52:04 | 1:38 | 10.97% |
| South Africa | Durban | 14:09:56 | 15:05:51 | 15:57:31 | 1:48 | 16.10% |
| South Africa | Johannesburg | 14:26:07 | 15:11:40 | 15:54:16 | 1:28 | 7.93% |
| South Africa | Pretoria | 14:27:59 | 15:12:48 | 15:54:44 | 1:27 | 7.58% |
| Botswana | Gaborone | 14:36:15 | 15:13:23 | 15:48:30 | 1:12 | 4.05% |
| Eswatini | Mbabane | 14:23:15 | 15:13:44 | 16:00:35 | 1:37 | 11.79% |
| Mozambique | Maputo | 14:23:54 | 15:15:31 | 16:03:16 | 1:39 | 13.10% |
| Zimbabwe | Harare | 15:01:59 | 15:31:22 | 15:59:23 | 0:57 | 2.36% |
| British Indian Ocean Territory | Diego Garcia | 19:07:59 | 19:31:40 | 19:33:56 (sunset) | 0:26 | 10.95% |
| Réunion | Saint-Denis | 16:37:08 | 17:32:56 | 18:24:06 | 1:47 | 31.14% |
| Mauritius | Port Louis | 16:38:57 | 17:34:07 | 18:24:43 | 1:46 | 31.64% |
| Madagascar | Antananarivo | 15:43:39 | 16:35:24 | 17:23:00 | 1:39 | 19.98% |
| Madagascar | Toamasina | 15:45:35 | 16:36:57 | 17:24:15 | 1:39 | 20.55% |
| Malawi | Lilongwe | 15:17:53 | 15:39:57 | 16:01:11 | 0:43 | 1.09% |
| Mayotte | Mamoudzou | 16:05:50 | 16:45:03 | 17:21:48 | 1:16 | 8.20% |
| Comoros | Moroni | 16:12:12 | 16:46:28 | 17:18:48 | 1:07 | 5.21% |
| Seychelles | Victoria | 17:29:11 | 17:55:35 | 18:20:52 | 0:52 | 3.21% |

== Eclipse details ==
Shown below are two tables displaying details about this particular solar eclipse. The first table outlines times at which the Moon's penumbra or umbra attains the specific parameter, and the second table describes various other parameters pertaining to this eclipse.

February 17, 2026 Solar Eclipse Times
| Event | Time (UTC) |
|---|---|
| First Penumbral External Contact | 2026 February 17 at 09:57:35.9 UTC |
| Equatorial Conjunction | 2026 February 17 at 11:19:59.0 UTC |
| First Umbral External Contact | 2026 February 17 at 11:44:00.0 UTC |
| First Central Line | 2026 February 17 at 11:49:27.4 UTC |
| Greatest Duration | 2026 February 17 at 11:49:27.4 UTC |
| First Umbral Internal Contact | 2026 February 17 at 11:56:29.1 UTC |
| Ecliptic Conjunction | 2026 February 17 at 12:02:18.1 UTC |
| Greatest Eclipse | 2026 February 17 at 12:13:05.8 UTC |
| Last Umbral Internal Contact | 2026 February 17 at 12:30:19.1 UTC |
| Last Central Line | 2026 February 17 at 12:37:17.4 UTC |
| Last Umbral External Contact | 2026 February 17 at 12:42:41.3 UTC |
| Last Penumbral External Contact | 2026 February 17 at 14:28:51.0 UTC |

February 17, 2026 Solar Eclipse Parameters
| Parameter | Value |
|---|---|
| Eclipse Magnitude | 0.96300 |
| Eclipse Obscuration | 0.92736 |
| Gamma | −0.97427 |
| Sun Right Ascension | 22h03m54.3s |
| Sun Declination | -11°52'42.3" |
| Sun Semi-Diameter | 16'11.1" |
| Sun Equatorial Horizontal Parallax | 08.9" |
| Moon Right Ascension | 22h05m34.0s |
| Moon Declination | -12°42'29.5" |
| Moon Semi-Diameter | 15'32.4" |
| Moon Equatorial Horizontal Parallax | 0°57'02.0" |
| ΔT | 72.2 s |

== Eclipse season ==
The eclipse is part of an eclipse season, a period, roughly every six months, when eclipses occur. Only two (or occasionally three) eclipse seasons occur each year, and each season lasts about 35 days and repeats just short of six months (173 days) later; thus two full eclipse seasons always occur each year. Either two or three eclipses happen each eclipse season. In the sequence below, each eclipse is separated by a fortnight.

Eclipse season of February–March 2026
| February 17 Ascending node (new moon) | March 3 Descending node (full moon) |
|---|---|
| Annular solar eclipse Solar Saros 121 | Total lunar eclipse Lunar Saros 133 |

== Related eclipses ==
=== Eclipses in 2026 ===
- An annular solar eclipse on February 17.
- A total lunar eclipse on March 3.
- A total solar eclipse on August 12.
- A partial lunar eclipse on August 28.

=== Metonic ===
- Preceded by: Solar eclipse of April 30, 2022
- Followed by: Solar eclipse of December 5, 2029

=== Tzolkinex ===
- Preceded by: Solar eclipse of January 6, 2019
- Followed by: Solar eclipse of March 30, 2033

=== Half-Saros ===
- Preceded by: Lunar eclipse of February 11, 2017
- Followed by: Lunar eclipse of February 22, 2035

=== Tritos ===
- Preceded by: Solar eclipse of March 20, 2015
- Followed by: Solar eclipse of January 16, 2037

=== Solar Saros 121 ===
- Preceded by: Solar eclipse of February 7, 2008
- Followed by: Solar eclipse of February 28, 2044

=== Inex ===
- Preceded by: Solar eclipse of March 9, 1997
- Followed by: Solar eclipse of January 27, 2055

=== Triad ===
- Preceded by: Solar eclipse of April 19, 1939
- Followed by: Solar eclipse of December 19, 2112

=== Solar eclipses of 2026–2029 ===
This eclipse is a member of a semester series. An eclipse in a semester series of solar eclipses repeats approximately every 177 days and 4 hours (a semester) at alternating nodes of the Moon's orbit.

The partial solar eclipses on June 12, 2029 and December 5, 2029 occur in the next lunar year eclipse set.

Solar eclipse series sets from 2026 to 2029
| Ascending node | | | Descending node | | |
| Saros | Map | Gamma | Saros | Map | Gamma |
| 121 | February 17, 2026 Annular | −0.97427 | 126 | August 12, 2026 Total | 0.89774 |
| 131 | February 6, 2027 Annular | −0.29515 | 136 | August 2, 2027 Total | 0.14209 |
| 141 | January 26, 2028 Annular | 0.39014 | 146 | July 22, 2028 Total | −0.60557 |
| 151 | January 14, 2029 Partial | 1.05532 | 156 | July 11, 2029 Partial | −1.41908 |

=== Saros 121 ===
This eclipse is a part of Saros series 121, repeating every 18 years, 11 days, and containing 71 events. The series started with a partial solar eclipse on April 25, 944 AD. It contains total eclipses from July 10, 1070 through October 9, 1809; hybrid eclipses on October 20, 1827 and October 30, 1845; and annular eclipses from November 11, 1863 through February 28, 2044. The series ends at member 71 as a partial eclipse on June 7, 2206. Its eclipses are tabulated in three columns; every third eclipse in the same column is one exeligmos apart, so they all cast shadows over approximately the same parts of the Earth.

The longest duration of totality was produced by member 39 at 6 minutes, 20 seconds on June 21, 1629, and the longest duration of annularity will be produced by member 62 at 2 minutes, 27 seconds on February 28, 2044. All eclipses in this series occur at the Moon’s ascending node of orbit.

Series members 49–70 occur between 1801 and 2200:
| 49 | 50 | 51 |
|---|---|---|
| October 9, 1809 | October 20, 1827 | October 30, 1845 |
| 52 | 53 | 54 |
| November 11, 1863 | November 21, 1881 | December 3, 1899 |
| 55 | 56 | 57 |
| December 14, 1917 | December 25, 1935 | January 5, 1954 |
| 58 | 59 | 60 |
| January 16, 1972 | January 26, 1990 | February 7, 2008 |
| 61 | 62 | 63 |
| February 17, 2026 | February 28, 2044 | March 11, 2062 |
| 64 | 65 | 66 |
| March 21, 2080 | April 1, 2098 | April 13, 2116 |
| 67 | 68 | 69 |
| April 24, 2134 | May 4, 2152 | May 16, 2170 |
70
May 26, 2188

=== Metonic series ===
The metonic series repeats eclipses every 19 years (6939.69 days), lasting about 5 cycles. Eclipses occur in nearly the same calendar date. In addition, the octon subseries repeats 1/5 of that or every 3.8 years (1387.94 days). All eclipses in this table occur at the Moon's ascending node.

21 eclipse events between July 13, 2018 and July 12, 2094
| July 12–13 | April 30–May 1 | February 16–17 | December 5–6 | September 22–23 |
| 117 | 119 | 121 | 123 | 125 |
|---|---|---|---|---|
| July 13, 2018 | April 30, 2022 | February 17, 2026 | December 5, 2029 | September 23, 2033 |
| 127 | 129 | 131 | 133 | 135 |
| July 13, 2037 | April 30, 2041 | February 16, 2045 | December 5, 2048 | September 22, 2052 |
| 137 | 139 | 141 | 143 | 145 |
| July 12, 2056 | April 30, 2060 | February 17, 2064 | December 6, 2067 | September 23, 2071 |
| 147 | 149 | 151 | 153 | 155 |
| July 13, 2075 | May 1, 2079 | February 16, 2083 | December 6, 2086 | September 23, 2090 |
157
July 12, 2094

=== Tritos series ===
This eclipse is a part of a tritos cycle, repeating at alternating nodes every 135 synodic months (≈ 3986.63 days, or 11 years minus 1 month). Their appearance and longitude are irregular due to a lack of synchronization with the anomalistic month (period of perigee), but groupings of 3 tritos cycles (≈ 33 years minus 3 months) come close (≈ 434.044 anomalistic months), so eclipses are similar in these groupings.

The partial solar eclipses on March 27, 1884 (part of Saros 108) and December 24, 1916 (part of Saros 111) are also a part of this series but are not included in the table below.

Series members between 1971 and 2200
| July 22, 1971 (Saros 116) | June 21, 1982 (Saros 117) | May 21, 1993 (Saros 118) | April 19, 2004 (Saros 119) | March 20, 2015 (Saros 120) |
| February 17, 2026 (Saros 121) | January 16, 2037 (Saros 122) | December 16, 2047 (Saros 123) | November 16, 2058 (Saros 124) | October 15, 2069 (Saros 125) |
| September 13, 2080 (Saros 126) | August 15, 2091 (Saros 127) | July 15, 2102 (Saros 128) | June 13, 2113 (Saros 129) | May 14, 2124 (Saros 130) |
| April 13, 2135 (Saros 131) | March 12, 2146 (Saros 132) | February 9, 2157 (Saros 133) | January 10, 2168 (Saros 134) | December 9, 2178 (Saros 135) |
| November 8, 2189 (Saros 136) | October 9, 2200 (Saros 137) | | | |

=== Inex series ===
This eclipse is a part of the long period inex cycle, repeating at alternating nodes, every 358 synodic months (≈ 10,571.95 days, or 29 years minus 20 days). Their appearance and longitude are irregular due to a lack of synchronization with the anomalistic month (period of perigee). However, groupings of 3 inex cycles (≈ 87 years minus 2 months) comes close (≈ 1,151.02 anomalistic months), so eclipses are similar in these groupings.

Series members between 1801 and 2200
| July 8, 1823 (Saros 114) | June 17, 1852 (Saros 115) | May 27, 1881 (Saros 116) |
| May 9, 1910 (Saros 117) | April 19, 1939 (Saros 118) | March 28, 1968 (Saros 119) |
| March 9, 1997 (Saros 120) | February 17, 2026 (Saros 121) | January 27, 2055 (Saros 122) |
| January 7, 2084 (Saros 123) | December 19, 2112 (Saros 124) | November 28, 2141 (Saros 125) |
| November 8, 2170 (Saros 126) | October 19, 2199 (Saros 127) | |
