= Solar eclipse of November 4, 2040 =

Future partial solar eclipse

- Partial eclipse
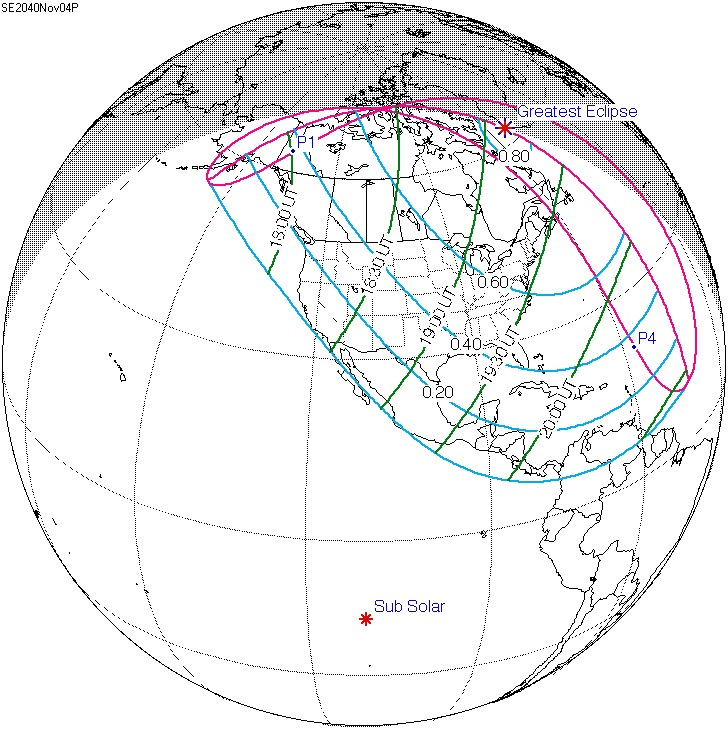
- Map
- Gamma: 1.0993
- Magnitude: 0.8074

Maximum eclipse
- Coordinates: 62.2°N 53.4°W

Times (UTC)
- Greatest eclipse: 19:09:02

References
- Saros: 124 (56 of 73)
- Catalog # (SE5000): 9598

A partial solar eclipse will occur at the Moon's descending node of orbit on Sunday, November 4, 2040, with a magnitude of 0.8074. A solar eclipse occurs when the Moon passes between Earth and the Sun, thereby totally or partly obscuring the image of the Sun for a viewer on Earth. A partial solar eclipse occurs in the polar regions of the Earth when the center of the Moon's shadow misses the Earth.

A partial eclipse will be visible for parts of North America, Central America, the Caribbean, and northern South America.

== Images ==
Animated path

== Eclipse timing ==
=== Places experiencing partial eclipse ===
Solar Eclipse of November 4, 2040 (Local Times)
Country or territory	City or place	Start of partial eclipse	Maximum eclipse	End of partial eclipse	Duration of eclipse (hr:min)	Maximum coverage
United States	Los Angeles	10:01:51	10:24:39	10:47:51	0:46	0.79%
Greenland	Nuuk	15:56:45	16:51:35	16:57:47 (sunset)	1:01	64.31%
United States	Chicago	11:45:49	13:04:24	14:20:20	2:35	47.87%
United States	Detroit	12:51:06	14:10:43	15:26:32	2:35	52.84%
Canada	Montreal	12:59:46	14:18:42	15:32:28	2:33	62.77%
Mexico	Mexico City	12:40:59	13:21:08	14:00:43	1:20	3.40%
United States	Washington, D.C.	13:05:20	14:25:06	15:39:15	2:34	53.12%
United States	New York City	13:06:47	14:26:14	15:39:45	2:33	57.16%
Saint Pierre and Miquelon	Saint-Pierre	15:21:02	16:34:15	17:23:43 (sunset)	2:03	67.19%
Belize	Belmopan	12:48:53	13:43:05	14:34:37	1:46	9.38%
Cuba	Havana	13:34:04	14:43:43	15:48:16	2:14	24.00%
Guatemala	Guatemala City	13:01:21	13:44:34	14:26:07	1:25	4.50%
Bahamas	Nassau	13:35:47	14:48:11	15:54:20	2:19	30.49%
Cayman Islands	George Town	13:48:00	14:51:38	15:50:31	2:03	17.74%
Bermuda	Hamilton	14:38:14	15:52:01	16:58:25	2:20	46.72%
Jamaica	Kingston	13:58:47	15:00:19	15:56:42	1:58	17.41%
Turks and Caicos Islands	Providenciales	13:53:24	15:00:27	16:01:08	2:08	25.89%
Turks and Caicos Islands	Cockburn Harbour	13:55:24	15:01:46	16:01:49	2:06	25.46%
Turks and Caicos Islands	Cockburn Town	13:56:08	15:02:18	16:02:08	2:06	25.45%
Haiti	Port-au-Prince	14:03:32	15:05:14	16:01:20	1:58	19.53%
Dominican Republic	Santo Domingo	15:07:33	16:08:09	17:03:09	1:56	19.60%
Puerto Rico	San Juan	15:13:29	16:12:08	17:05:17	1:52	19.51%
United States Virgin Islands	Charlotte Amalie	15:15:43	16:13:25	17:05:44	1:50	19.12%
United States Virgin Islands	Cruz Bay	15:15:58	16:13:34	17:05:47	1:50	19.08%
British Virgin Islands	Road Town	15:15:55	16:13:35	17:05:52	1:50	19.25%
British Virgin Islands	Spanish Town	15:16:08	16:13:44	17:05:56	1:50	19.26%
Saint Kitts and Nevis	Basseterre	15:22:32	16:16:43	17:06:01	1:43	16.63%
Antigua and Barbuda	St. John's	15:24:26	16:17:39	17:06:07	1:42	16.08%
Guadeloupe	Basse-Terre	15:28:29	16:19:09	17:05:28	1:37	13.84%
Venezuela	Caracas	15:43:41	16:21:30	16:56:52	1:13	4.97%

== Eclipse details ==
Shown below are two tables displaying details about this particular solar eclipse. The first table outlines times at which the Moon's penumbra or umbra attains the specific parameter, and the second table describes various other parameters pertaining to this eclipse.

November 4, 2040 Solar Eclipse Times
Event	Time (UTC)
First Penumbral External Contact	2040 November 4 at 17:09:37.4 UTC
Equatorial Conjunction	2040 November 4 at 18:17:26.3 UTC
Ecliptic Conjunction	2040 November 4 at 18:57:12.1 UTC
Greatest Eclipse	2040 November 4 at 19:09:02.0 UTC
Last Penumbral External Contact	2040 November 4 at 21:08:42.2 UTC

November 4, 2040 Solar Eclipse Parameters
Parameter	Value
Eclipse Magnitude	0.80742
Eclipse Obscuration	0.75126
Gamma	1.09928
Sun Right Ascension	14h42m06.9s
Sun Declination	-15°43'53.8"
Sun Semi-Diameter	16'07.7"
Sun Equatorial Horizontal Parallax	08.9"
Moon Right Ascension	14h43m50.8s
Moon Declination	-14°45'19.8"
Moon Semi-Diameter	15'49.8"
Moon Equatorial Horizontal Parallax	0°58'05.7"
ΔT	79.0 s

== Eclipse season ==
This eclipse is part of an eclipse season, a period, roughly every six months, when eclipses occur. Only two (or occasionally three) eclipse seasons occur each year, and each season lasts about 35 days and repeats just short of six months (173 days) later; thus two full eclipse seasons always occur each year. Either two or three eclipses happen each eclipse season. In the sequence below, each eclipse is separated by a fortnight.

Eclipse season of November 2040
November 4 Descending node (new moon)	November 18 Ascending node (full moon)
Partial solar eclipse Solar Saros 124	Total lunar eclipse Lunar Saros 136

== Related eclipses ==
=== Eclipses in 2040 ===
- A partial solar eclipse on May 11.
- A total lunar eclipse on May 26.
- A partial solar eclipse on November 4.
- A total lunar eclipse on November 18.

=== Metonic ===
- Preceded by: Solar eclipse of January 16, 2037
- Followed by: Solar eclipse of August 23, 2044

=== Tzolkinex ===
- Preceded by: Solar eclipse of September 23, 2033
- Followed by: Solar eclipse of December 16, 2047

=== Half-Saros ===
- Preceded by: Lunar eclipse of October 30, 2031
- Followed by: Lunar eclipse of November 9, 2049

=== Tritos ===
- Preceded by: Solar eclipse of December 5, 2029
- Followed by: Solar eclipse of October 4, 2051

=== Solar Saros 124 ===
- Preceded by: Solar eclipse of October 25, 2022
- Followed by: Solar eclipse of November 16, 2058

=== Inex ===
- Preceded by: Solar eclipse of November 25, 2011
- Followed by: Solar eclipse of October 15, 2069

=== Triad ===
- Preceded by: Solar eclipse of January 5, 1954
- Followed by: Solar eclipse of September 6, 2127

=== Solar eclipses of 2040–2043 ===
This eclipse is a member of a semester series. An eclipse in a semester series of solar eclipses repeats approximately every 177 days and 4 hours (a semester) at alternating nodes of the Moon's orbit.

Solar eclipse series sets from 2040 to 2043
Ascending node			Descending node		
Saros	Map	Gamma	Saros	Map	Gamma
119	May 11, 2040 Partial	−1.2529	124	November 4, 2040 Partial	1.0993
129	April 30, 2041 Total	−0.4492	134	October 25, 2041 Annular	0.4133
139	April 20, 2042 Total	0.2956	144	October 14, 2042 Annular	−0.303
149	April 9, 2043 Total (non-central)	1.0031	154	October 3, 2043 Annular (non-central)	1.0102

=== Saros 124 ===
This eclipse is a part of Saros series 124, repeating every 18 years, 11 days, and containing 73 events. The series started with a partial solar eclipse on March 6, 1049. It contains total eclipses from June 12, 1211 through September 22, 1968, and a hybrid eclipse on October 3, 1986. There are no annular eclipses in this set. The series ends at member 73 as a partial eclipse on May 11, 2347. Its eclipses are tabulated in three columns; every third eclipse in the same column is one exeligmos apart, so they all cast shadows over approximately the same parts of the Earth.

The longest duration of totality was produced by member 39 at 5 minutes, 46 seconds on May 3, 1734. All eclipses in this series occur at the Moon’s descending node of orbit.

Series members 43–64 occur between 1801 and 2200:
43	44	45
June 16, 1806	June 26, 1824	July 8, 1842
46	47	48
July 18, 1860	July 29, 1878	August 9, 1896
49	50	51
August 21, 1914	August 31, 1932	September 12, 1950
52	53	54
September 22, 1968	October 3, 1986	October 14, 2004
55	56	57
October 25, 2022	November 4, 2040	November 16, 2058
58	59	60
November 26, 2076	December 7, 2094	December 19, 2112
61	62	63
December 30, 2130	January 9, 2149	January 21, 2167
64
January 31, 2185

=== Metonic series ===
The metonic series repeats eclipses every 19 years (6939.69 days), lasting about 5 cycles. Eclipses occur in nearly the same calendar date. In addition, the octon subseries repeats 1/5 of that or every 3.8 years (1387.94 days). All eclipses in this table occur at the Moon's descending node.

22 eclipse events between June 12, 2029 and November 4, 2116
June 11–12	March 30–31	January 16	November 4–5	August 23–24
118	120	122	124	126
June 12, 2029	March 30, 2033	January 16, 2037	November 4, 2040	August 23, 2044
128	130	132	134	136
June 11, 2048	March 30, 2052	January 16, 2056	November 5, 2059	August 24, 2063
138	140	142	144	146
June 11, 2067	March 31, 2071	January 16, 2075	November 4, 2078	August 24, 2082
148	150	152	154	156
June 11, 2086	March 31, 2090	January 16, 2094	November 4, 2097	August 24, 2101
158	160	162	164	
June 12, 2105			November 4, 2116	

=== Tritos series ===
This eclipse is a part of a tritos cycle, repeating at alternating nodes every 135 synodic months (≈ 3986.63 days, or 11 years minus 1 month). Their appearance and longitude are irregular due to a lack of synchronization with the anomalistic month (period of perigee), but groupings of 3 tritos cycles (≈ 33 years minus 3 months) come close (≈ 434.044 anomalistic months), so eclipses are similar in these groupings.

Series members between 1866 and 2200
March 16, 1866 (Saros 108)			December 13, 1898 (Saros 111)	
	September 12, 1931 (Saros 114)	August 12, 1942 (Saros 115)	July 11, 1953 (Saros 116)	June 10, 1964 (Saros 117)
May 11, 1975 (Saros 118)	April 9, 1986 (Saros 119)	March 9, 1997 (Saros 120)	February 7, 2008 (Saros 121)	January 6, 2019 (Saros 122)
December 5, 2029 (Saros 123)	November 4, 2040 (Saros 124)	October 4, 2051 (Saros 125)	September 3, 2062 (Saros 126)	August 3, 2073 (Saros 127)
July 3, 2084 (Saros 128)	June 2, 2095 (Saros 129)	May 3, 2106 (Saros 130)	April 2, 2117 (Saros 131)	March 1, 2128 (Saros 132)
January 30, 2139 (Saros 133)	December 30, 2149 (Saros 134)	November 27, 2160 (Saros 135)	October 29, 2171 (Saros 136)	September 27, 2182 (Saros 137)
August 26, 2193 (Saros 138)

=== Inex series ===
This eclipse is a part of the long period inex cycle, repeating at alternating nodes, every 358 synodic months (≈ 10,571.95 days, or 29 years minus 20 days). Their appearance and longitude are irregular due to a lack of synchronization with the anomalistic month (period of perigee). However, groupings of 3 inex cycles (≈ 87 years minus 2 months) comes close (≈ 1,151.02 anomalistic months), so eclipses are similar in these groupings.

Series members between 1801 and 2200
April 14, 1809 (Saros 116)	March 25, 1838 (Saros 117)	March 6, 1867 (Saros 118)
February 13, 1896 (Saros 119)	January 24, 1925 (Saros 120)	January 5, 1954 (Saros 121)
December 15, 1982 (Saros 122)	November 25, 2011 (Saros 123)	November 4, 2040 (Saros 124)
October 15, 2069 (Saros 125)	September 25, 2098 (Saros 126)	September 6, 2127 (Saros 127)
August 16, 2156 (Saros 128)	July 26, 2185 (Saros 129)	
