= Solar eclipse of April 30, 2022 =

Partial solar eclipse

- Partial eclipse
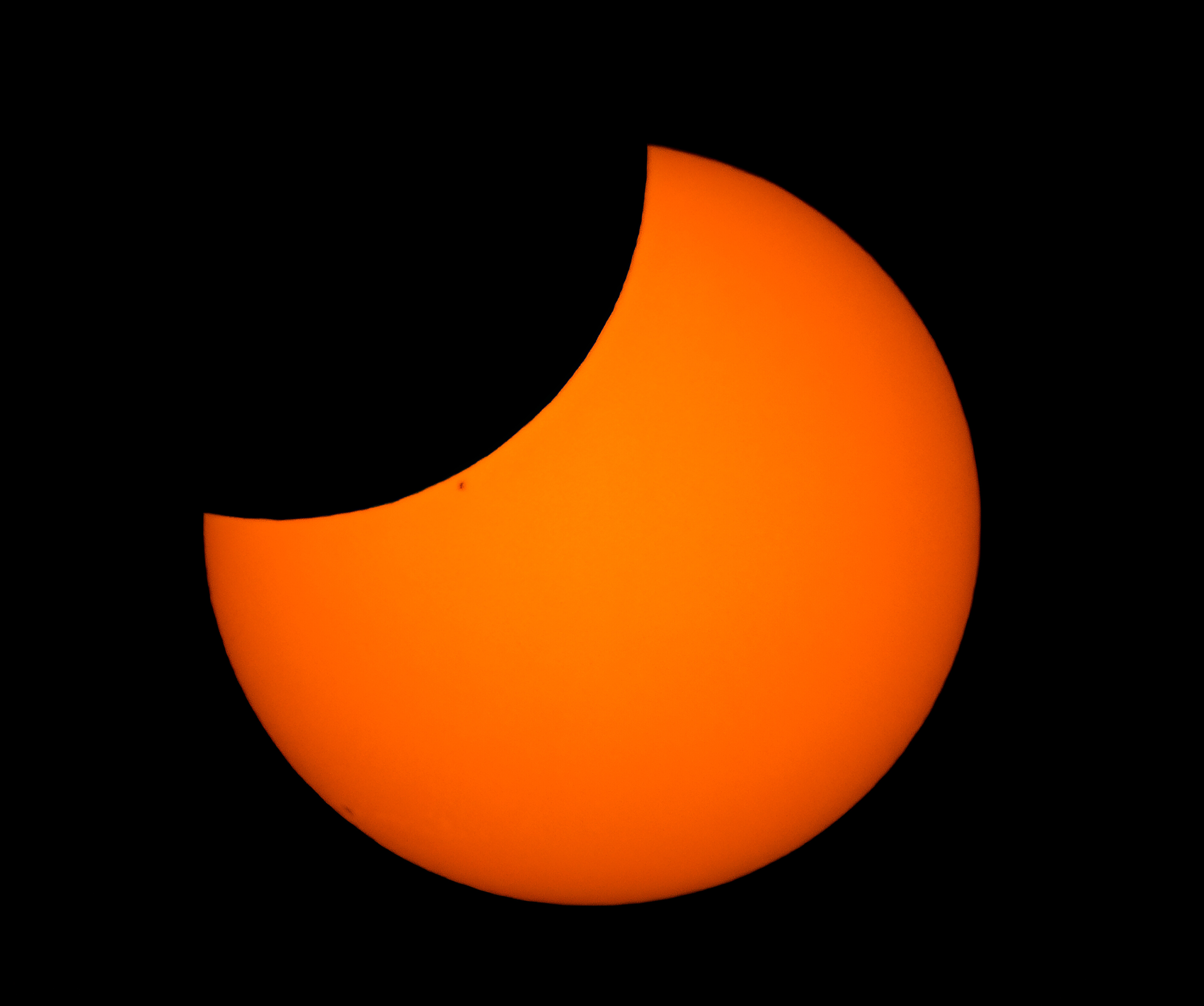
- Partial from the CTIO

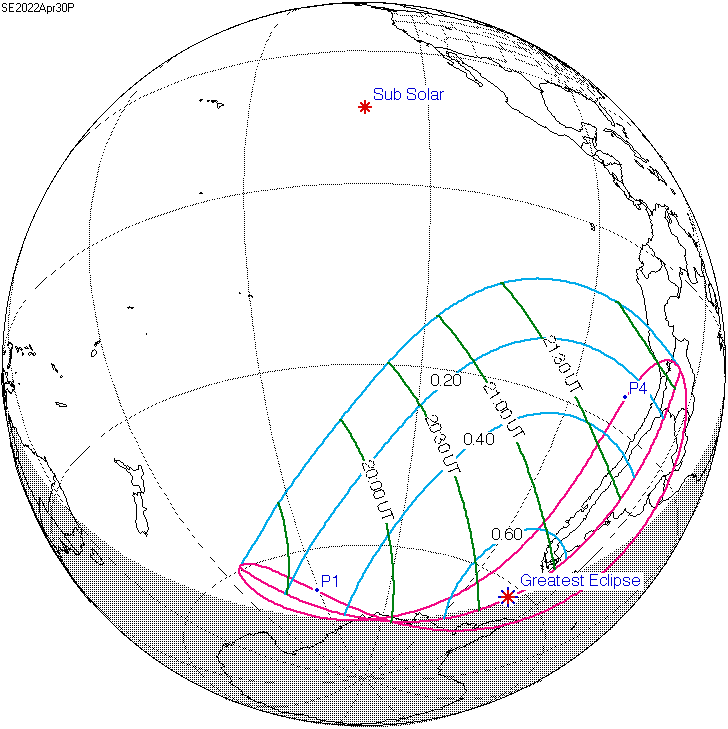
- Map
- Gamma: −1.1901
- Magnitude: 0.6396

Maximum eclipse
- Coordinates: 62.1°S 71.5°W

Times (UTC)
- Greatest eclipse: 20:42:36

References
- Saros: 119 (66 of 71)
- Catalog # (SE5000): 9557

A partial solar eclipse occurred at the Moon’s ascending node of orbit on Saturday, April 30, 2022, with a magnitude of 0.6396. A solar eclipse occurs when the Moon passes between Earth and the Sun, thereby totally or partly obscuring the image of the Sun for a viewer on Earth. A partial solar eclipse occurs in the polar regions of the Earth when the center of the Moon's shadow misses the Earth.

The eclipse was visible in parts of southern and central South America and Antarctica.

== Images ==
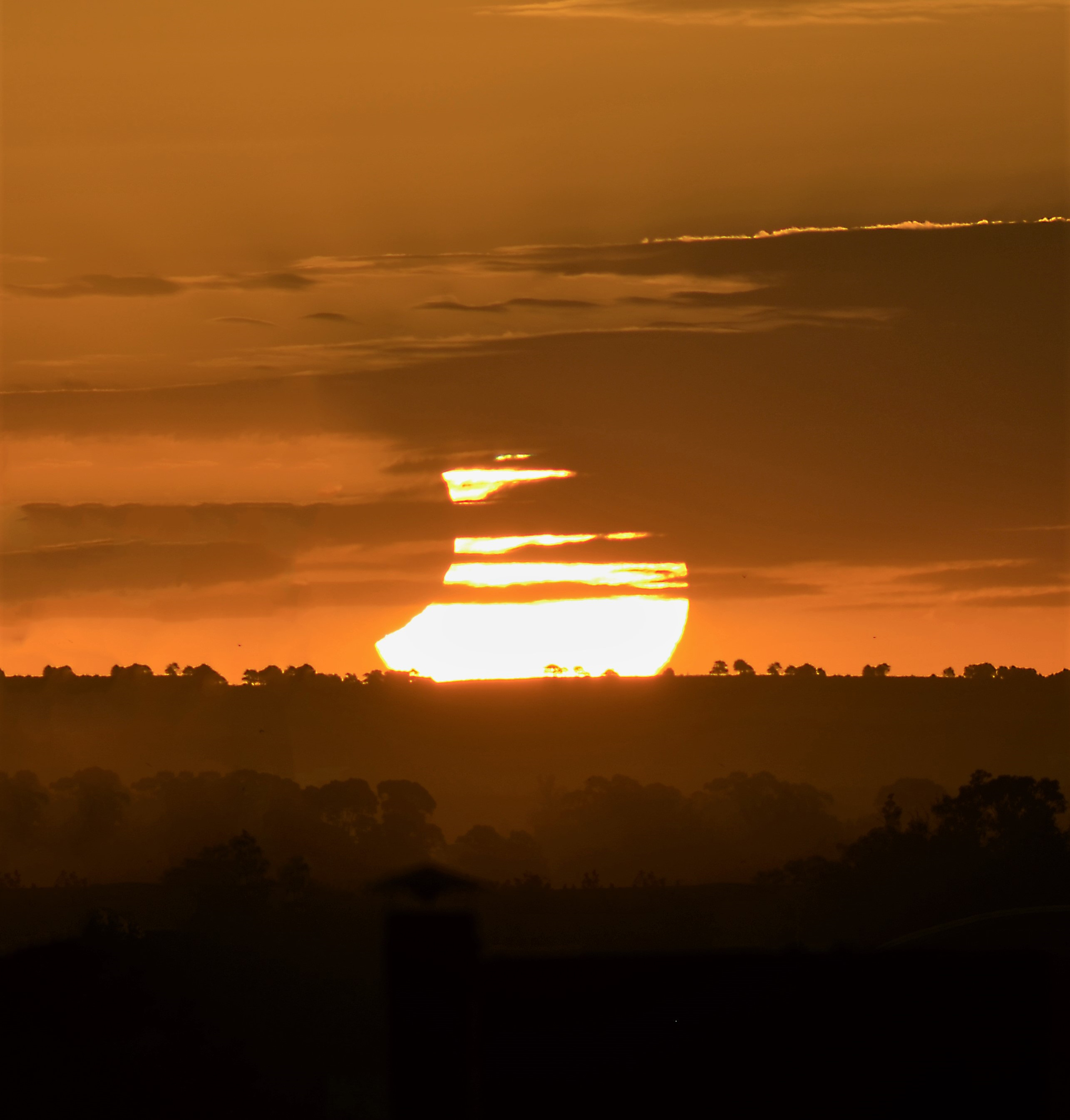
Partial solar eclipse at sunset from Mar del Plata, Argentina

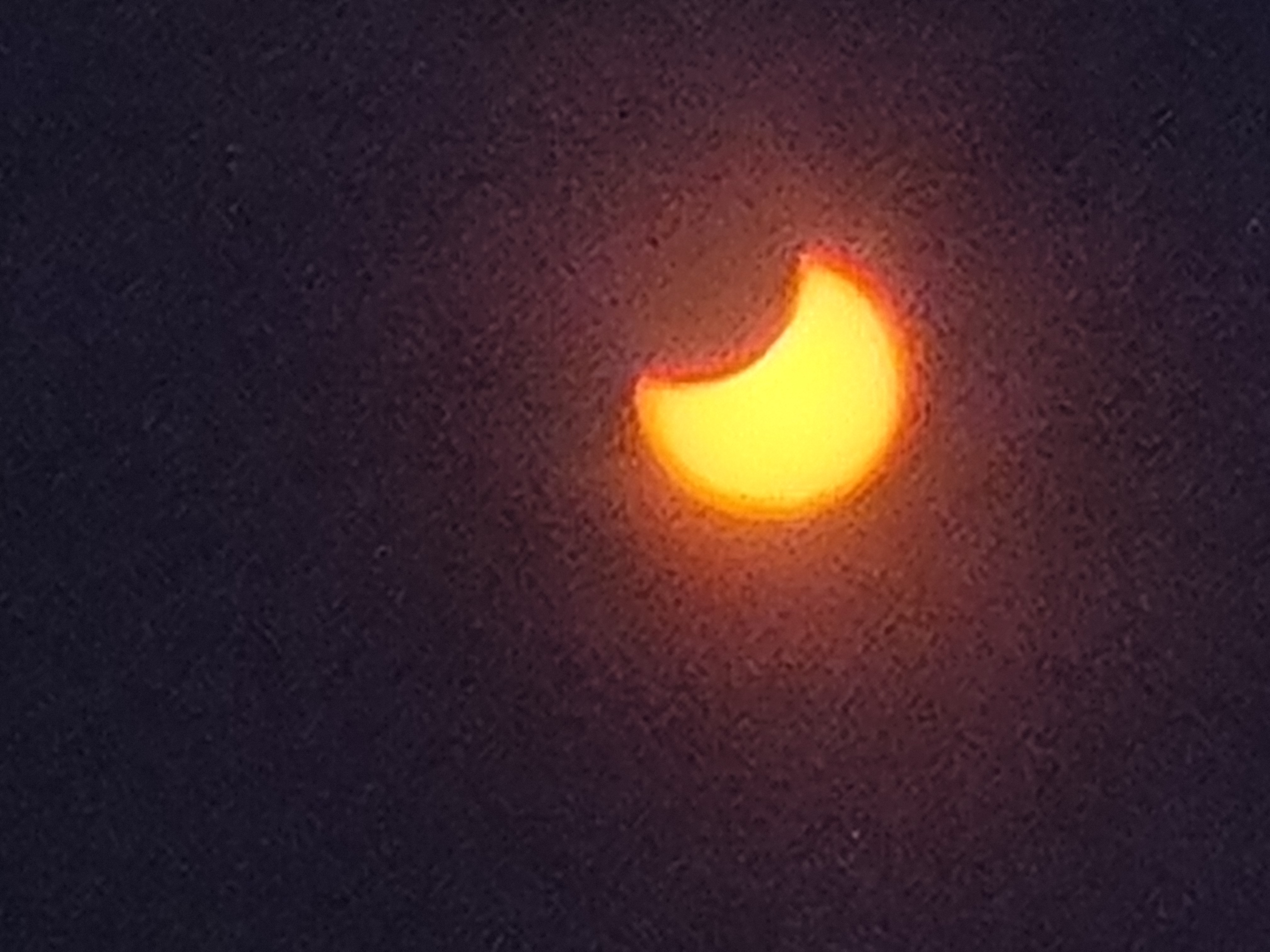
From Santiago, Chile

From San Pedro de Atacama, Chile

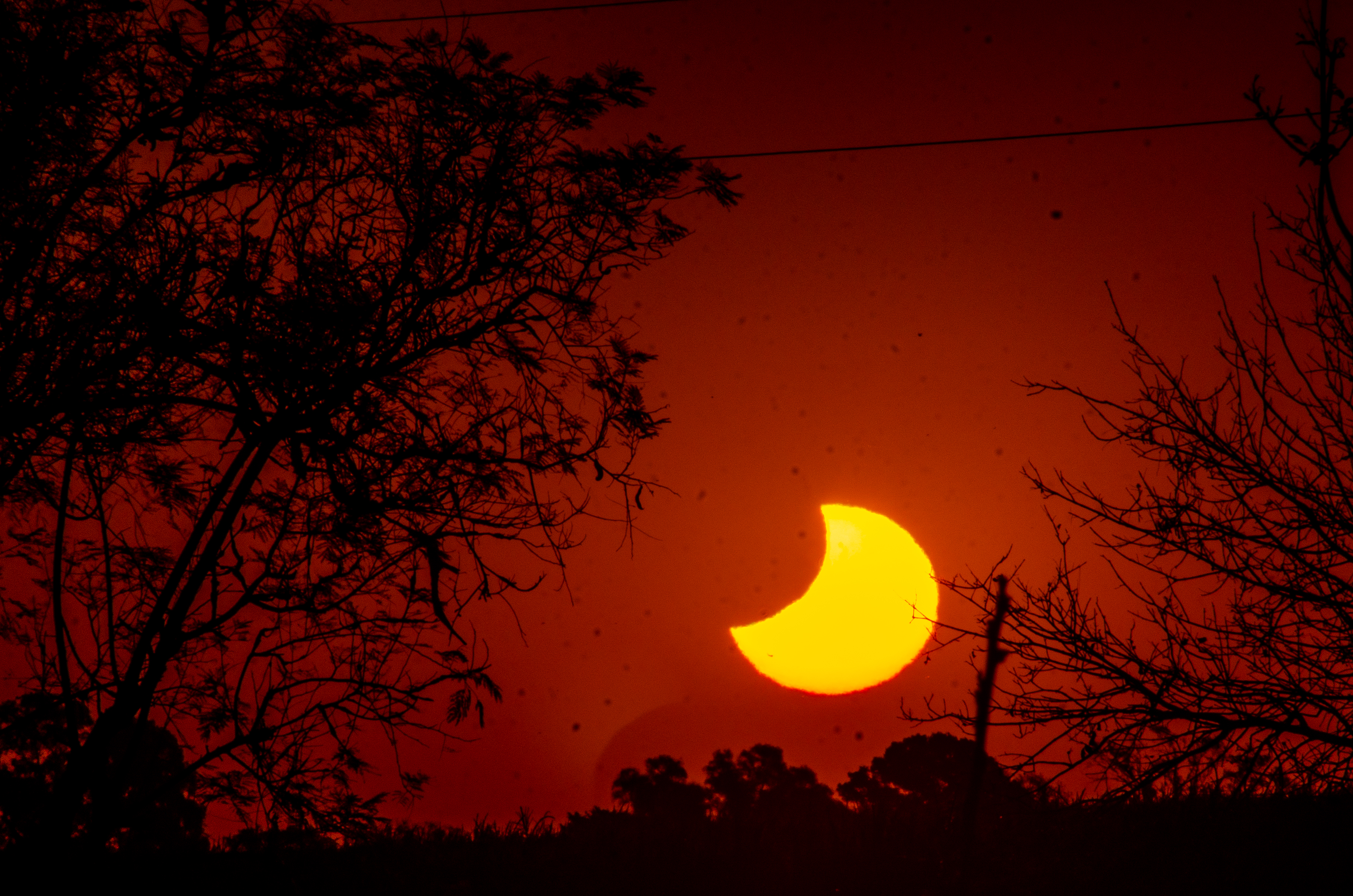

Animated path

== Eclipse timing ==
=== Places experiencing partial eclipse ===
Solar Eclipse of April 30, 2022 (Local Times)
Country or territory	City or place	Start of partial eclipse	Maximum eclipse	End of partial eclipse	Duration of eclipse (hr:min)	Maximum coverage
Antarctica	Esperanza Base	16:38:01	16:41:37	16:45:13 (sunset)	0:07	1.09%
Antarctica	Rothera Research Station	16:24:16	16:52:39	16:59:58 (sunset)	0:36	21.72%
Antarctica	Carlini Base	16:39:12	16:52:57	16:58:20 (sunset)	0:19	7.82%
Antarctica	Palmer Station	16:31:14	16:58:44	17:04:51 (sunset)	0:34	20.82%
Falkland Islands	Stanley	17:01:28	17:31:37	17:35:22 (sunset)	0:34	22.16%
Argentina	Ushuaia	16:46:05	17:57:45	18:07:41 (sunset)	1:22	52.15%
Chile	Punta Arenas	16:46:49	17:59:33	18:23:16 (sunset)	1:36	51.56%
Uruguay	Montevideo	17:43:59	18:00:27	18:03:11 (sunset)	0:19	7.36%
Argentina	Mar del Plata	17:34:34	18:00:43	18:03:35 (sunset)	0:29	14.80%
Uruguay	Rivera	17:56:01	18:03:57	18:06:33 (sunset)	0:11	2.31%
Uruguay	Durazno	17:47:58	18:04:10	18:06:51 (sunset)	0:19	6.86%
Chile	Easter Island	14:04:05	15:04:14	16:01:41	1:58	10.20%
Uruguay	Tacuarembó	17:53:13	18:04:31	18:07:09 (sunset)	0:14	3.93%
Argentina	Buenos Aires	17:42:56	18:09:41	18:12:24 (sunset)	0:29	13.73%
Brazil	Uruguaiana	17:58:06	18:11:45	18:14:19 (sunset)	0:16	4.70%
Uruguay	Paysandú	17:49:38	18:11:54	18:14:41 (sunset)	0:25	10.03%
Paraguay	Asunción	17:12:21	17:20:04	17:22:31 (sunset)	0:10	1.64%
Argentina	Rosario	17:45:27	18:21:21	18:24:01 (sunset)	0:39	17.99%
Argentina	Neuquén	17:21:46	18:28:25	18:43:58 (sunset)	1:22	36.06%
Chile	Santiago	16:33:15	17:36:50	18:03:14 (sunset)	1:30	28.47%
Argentina	Córdoba	17:46:20	18:37:44	18:40:22 (sunset)	0:54	22.05%
Argentina	Mendoza	17:36:57	18:38:36	18:56:50 (sunset)	1:20	26.90%
Argentina	San Miguel de Tucumán	17:59:17	18:48:18	18:50:48 (sunset)	0:52	15.06%
Argentina	Salta	18:05:53	18:51:04	18:54:14 (sunset)	0:48	11.77%
Bolivia	Santa Cruz de la Sierra	17:39:15	17:51:04	17:53:49 (sunset)	0:15	0.91%
Bolivia	Sucre	17:29:18	17:57:01	18:00:41 (sunset)	0:31	3.26%
Peru	Arequipa	16:34:12	17:01:14	17:26:55	0:55	2.05%
Bolivia	Cochabamba	17:36:49	18:01:16	18:06:10 (sunset)	0:29	1.73%
Bolivia	La Paz	17:39:05	18:01:58	18:15:05 (sunset)	0:36	1.36%

== Eclipse details ==
Shown below are two tables displaying details about this particular solar eclipse. The first table outlines times at which the Moon's penumbra or umbra attains the specific parameter, and the second table describes various other parameters pertaining to this eclipse.

April 30, 2022 Solar Eclipse Times
Event	Time (UTC)
First Penumbral External Contact	2022 April 30 at 18:46:30.1 UTC
Equatorial Conjunction	2022 April 30 at 19:41:58.7 UTC
Ecliptic Conjunction	2022 April 30 at 20:29:14.9 UTC
Greatest Eclipse	2022 April 30 at 20:42:36.5 UTC
Last Penumbral External Contact	2022 April 30 at 22:39:11.9 UTC

April 30, 2022 Solar Eclipse Parameters
Parameter	Value
Eclipse Magnitude	0.63963
Eclipse Obscuration	0.54175
Gamma	−1.19008
Sun Right Ascension	02h32m15.6s
Sun Declination	+14°57'53.5"
Sun Semi-Diameter	15'52.6"
Sun Equatorial Horizontal Parallax	08.7"
Moon Right Ascension	02h34m04.8s
Moon Declination	+13°57'48.8"
Moon Semi-Diameter	15'04.0"
Moon Equatorial Horizontal Parallax	0°55'17.7"
ΔT	70.7 s

== Eclipse season ==
This eclipse is part of an eclipse season, a period, roughly every six months, when eclipses occur. Only two (or occasionally three) eclipse seasons occur each year, and each season lasts about 35 days and repeats just short of six months (173 days) later; thus two full eclipse seasons always occur each year. Either two or three eclipses happen each eclipse season. In the sequence below, each eclipse is separated by a fortnight.

Eclipse season of April–May 2022
April 30 Ascending node (new moon)	May 16 Descending node (full moon)
Partial solar eclipse Solar Saros 119	Total lunar eclipse Lunar Saros 131

== Related eclipses ==
=== Eclipses in 2022 ===
- A partial solar eclipse on April 30.
- A total lunar eclipse on May 16.
- A partial solar eclipse on October 25.
- A total lunar eclipse on November 8.

=== Metonic ===
- Preceded by: Solar eclipse of July 13, 2018
- Followed by: Solar eclipse of February 17, 2026

=== Tzolkinex ===
- Preceded by: Solar eclipse of March 20, 2015
- Followed by: Solar eclipse of June 12, 2029

=== Half-Saros ===
- Preceded by: Lunar eclipse of April 25, 2013
- Followed by: Lunar eclipse of May 7, 2031

=== Tritos ===
- Preceded by: Solar eclipse of June 1, 2011
- Followed by: Solar eclipse of March 30, 2033

=== Solar Saros 119 ===
- Preceded by: Solar eclipse of April 19, 2004
- Followed by: Solar eclipse of May 11, 2040

=== Inex ===
- Preceded by: Solar eclipse of May 21, 1993
- Followed by: Solar eclipse of April 11, 2051

=== Triad ===
- Preceded by: Solar eclipse of June 30, 1935
- Followed by: Solar eclipse of March 1, 2109

=== Solar eclipses of 2022–2025 ===
Solar eclipse series sets from 2022 to 2025
Ascending node			Descending node		
Saros	Map	Gamma	Saros	Map	Gamma
119 Partial in CTIO, Chile	April 30, 2022 Partial	−1.19008	124 Partial from Saratov, Russia	October 25, 2022 Partial	1.07014
129 Totality in Timor-Leste	April 20, 2023 Hybrid	−0.39515	134 Annularity from Mexican Hat, Utah, USA	October 14, 2023 Annular	0.37534
139 Totality in Dallas, TX, USA	April 8, 2024 Total	0.34314	144 Annularity in Santa Cruz Province, Argentina	October 2, 2024 Annular	−0.35087
149 Partial from Halifax, Canada	March 29, 2025 Partial	1.04053	154	September 21, 2025 Partial	−1.06509

=== Saros 119 ===
This eclipse is a part of Saros series 119, repeating every 18 years, 11 days, and containing 71 events. The series started with a partial solar eclipse on May 15, 850 AD. It contains total eclipses on August 9, 994 AD and August 20, 1012; a hybrid eclipse on August 31, 1030; and annular eclipses from September 10, 1048 through March 18, 1950. The series ends at member 71 as a partial eclipse on June 24, 2112. Its eclipses are tabulated in three columns; every third eclipse in the same column is one exeligmos apart, so they all cast shadows over approximately the same parts of the Earth.

The longest duration of totality was produced by member 10 at 32 seconds on August 20, 1012, and the longest duration of annularity was produced by member 44 at 7 minutes, 37 seconds on September 1, 1625. All eclipses in this series occur at the Moon’s ascending node of orbit.

Series members 54–71 occur between 1801 and 2112:
54	55	56
December 21, 1805	January 1, 1824	January 11, 1842
57	58	59
January 23, 1860	February 2, 1878	February 13, 1896
60	61	62
February 25, 1914	March 7, 1932	March 18, 1950
63	64	65
March 28, 1968	April 9, 1986	April 19, 2004
66	67	68
April 30, 2022	May 11, 2040	May 22, 2058
69	70	71
June 1, 2076	June 13, 2094	June 24, 2112

=== Metonic series ===
The metonic series repeats eclipses every 19 years (6939.69 days), lasting about 5 cycles. Eclipses occur in nearly the same calendar date. In addition, the octon subseries repeats 1/5 of that or every 3.8 years (1387.94 days). All eclipses in this table occur at the Moon's ascending node.

21 eclipse events between July 13, 2018 and July 12, 2094
July 12–13	April 30–May 1	February 16–17	December 5–6	September 22–23
117	119	121	123	125
July 13, 2018	April 30, 2022	February 17, 2026	December 5, 2029	September 23, 2033
127	129	131	133	135
July 13, 2037	April 30, 2041	February 16, 2045	December 5, 2048	September 22, 2052
137	139	141	143	145
July 12, 2056	April 30, 2060	February 17, 2064	December 6, 2067	September 23, 2071
147	149	151	153	155
July 13, 2075	May 1, 2079	February 16, 2083	December 6, 2086	September 23, 2090
157
July 12, 2094

=== Tritos series ===
This eclipse is a part of a tritos cycle, repeating at alternating nodes every 135 synodic months (≈ 3986.63 days, or 11 years minus 1 month). Their appearance and longitude are irregular due to a lack of synchronization with the anomalistic month (period of perigee), but groupings of 3 tritos cycles (≈ 33 years minus 3 months) come close (≈ 434.044 anomalistic months), so eclipses are similar in these groupings.

The partial solar eclipses on April 8, 1902 (part of Saros 108) and January 5, 1935 (part of Saros 111) are also a part of this series but are not included in the table below.

Series members between 2000 and 2200
July 1, 2000 (Saros 117)	June 1, 2011 (Saros 118)	April 30, 2022 (Saros 119)	March 30, 2033 (Saros 120)	February 28, 2044 (Saros 121)
January 27, 2055 (Saros 122)	December 27, 2065 (Saros 123)	November 26, 2076 (Saros 124)	October 26, 2087 (Saros 125)	September 25, 2098 (Saros 126)
August 26, 2109 (Saros 127)	July 25, 2120 (Saros 128)	June 25, 2131 (Saros 129)	May 25, 2142 (Saros 130)	April 23, 2153 (Saros 131)
March 23, 2164 (Saros 132)	February 21, 2175 (Saros 133)	January 20, 2186 (Saros 134)	December 19, 2196 (Saros 135)	

=== Inex series ===
This eclipse is a part of the long period inex cycle, repeating at alternating nodes, every 358 synodic months (≈ 10,571.95 days, or 29 years minus 20 days). Their appearance and longitude are irregular due to a lack of synchronization with the anomalistic month (period of perigee). However, groupings of 3 inex cycles (≈ 87 years minus 2 months) comes close (≈ 1,151.02 anomalistic months), so eclipses are similar in these groupings.

Series members between 1801 and 2200
September 19, 1819 (Saros 112)	August 28, 1848 (Saros 113)	August 9, 1877 (Saros 114)
July 21, 1906 (Saros 115)	June 30, 1935 (Saros 116)	June 10, 1964 (Saros 117)
May 21, 1993 (Saros 118)	April 30, 2022 (Saros 119)	April 11, 2051 (Saros 120)
March 21, 2080 (Saros 121)	March 1, 2109 (Saros 122)	February 9, 2138 (Saros 123)
January 21, 2167 (Saros 124)	December 31, 2195 (Saros 125)	
