= Solar eclipse of July 13, 2018 =

21st-century partial solar eclipse

- Partial eclipse
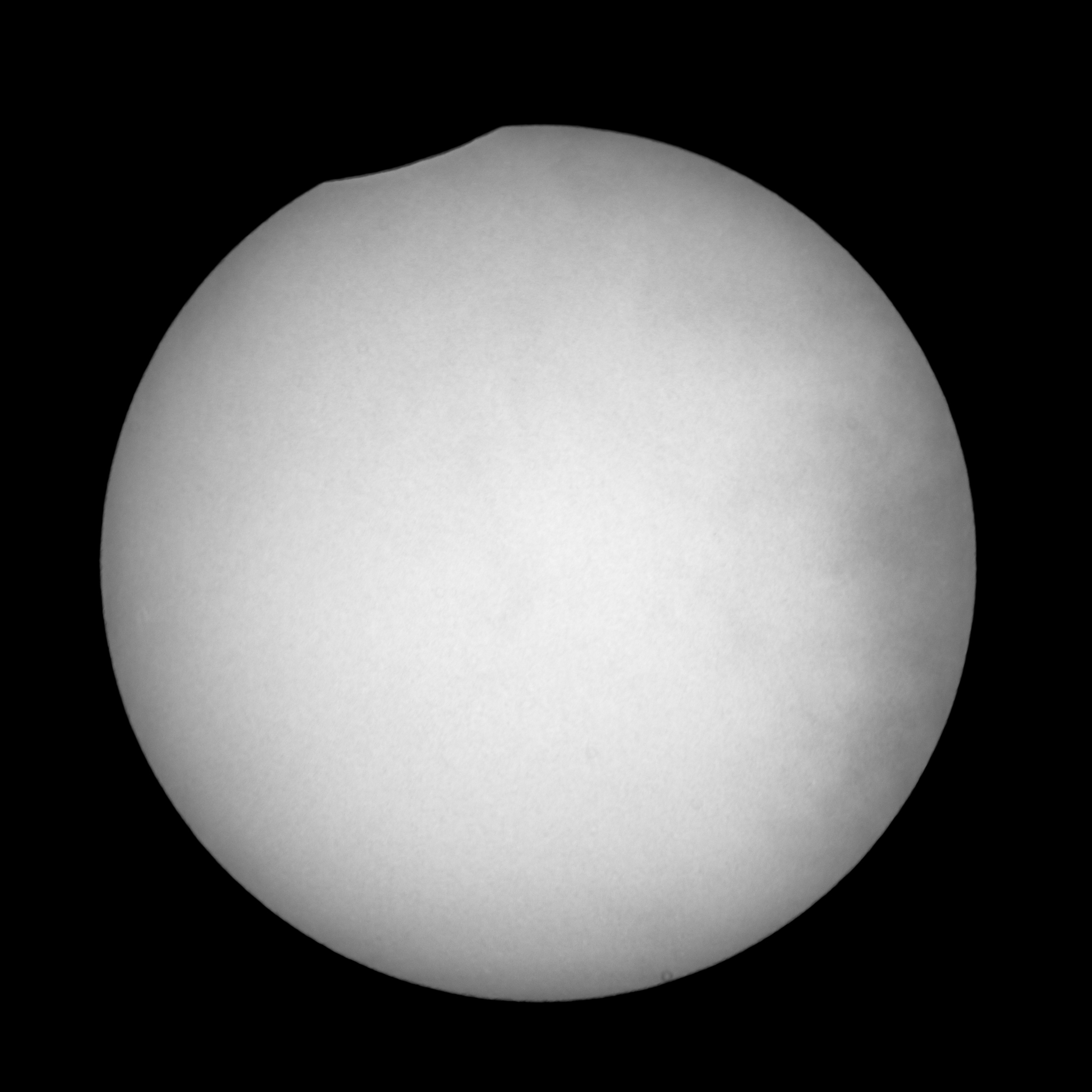
- From Melbourne, Australia

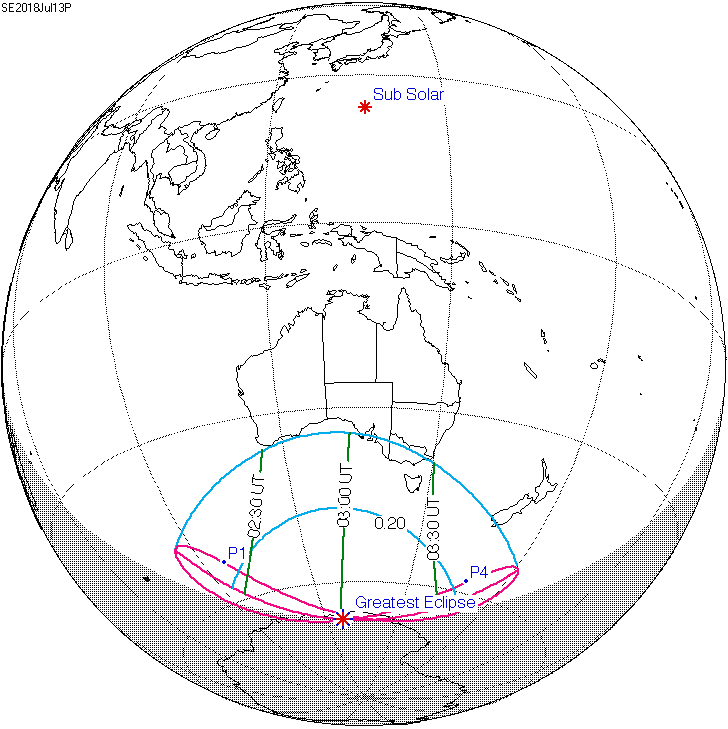
- Map
- Gamma: −1.3542
- Magnitude: 0.3365

Maximum eclipse
- Coordinates: 67.9°S 127.4°E

Times (UTC)
- Greatest eclipse: 3:02:16

References
- Saros: 117 (69 of 71)
- Catalog # (SE5000): 9548

A partial solar eclipse occurred at the Moon's ascending node of orbit on Friday, July 13, 2018, with a magnitude of 0.3365. A solar eclipse occurs when the Moon passes between Earth and the Sun, thereby totally or partly obscuring the image of the Sun for a viewer on Earth. A partial solar eclipse occurs in the polar regions of the Earth when the center of the Moon's shadow misses the Earth.

The moon's penumbra touched a small part of Antarctica, and southern Australia in Tasmania, where the eclipse was observed with a magnitude of about 0.1. The eclipse was also visible in Stewart Island, an island south of New Zealand.

== Eclipse timing ==
=== Places experiencing partial eclipse ===
Solar Eclipse of July 13, 2018 (Local Times)
Country or territory	City or place	Start of partial eclipse	Maximum eclipse	End of partial eclipse	Duration of eclipse (hr:min)	Maximum coverage
Antarctica	Casey Station	10:47:12 (sunrise)	10:59:17	11:34:42	0:48	18.61%
Australia	Port Lincoln	12:26:06	12:35:02	12:43:58	0:18	0.06%
Antarctica	Dumont d'Urville Station	12:22:36	13:10:33	13:58:14	1:36	21.58%
Australia	Mount Gambier	12:20:41	12:44:14	13:07:36	0:47	1.15%
Australia	Horsham	13:01:39	13:16:44	13:31:43	0:30	0.29%
Australia	Warrnambool	12:53:21	13:17:12	13:40:48	0:47	1.21%
Australia	Ararat	13:00:29	13:18:00	13:35:23	0:35	0.47%
Australia	St Arnaud	13:07:01	13:18:35	13:30:05	0:23	0.13%
Australia	Currie	12:51:27	13:19:26	13:47:02	0:56	2.05%
Australia	Ballarat	13:02:13	13:19:38	13:36:53	0:35	0.46%
Australia	Bendigo	13:10:40	13:20:22	13:30:01	0:19	0.08%
Australia	Geelong	13:00:31	13:20:25	13:40:07	0:40	0.71%
Australia	Kyneton	13:06:44	13:20:38	13:34:26	0:28	0.23%
Australia	Melton	13:04:05	13:20:49	13:37:25	0:33	0.42%
Australia	Melbourne	13:04:43	13:21:28	13:38:04	0:33	0.42%
Australia	Frankston	13:03:17	13:21:42	13:39:57	0:37	0.56%
Australia	Warragul	13:06:13	13:23:04	13:39:45	0:34	0.43%
Australia	Traralgon	13:08:26	13:24:04	13:39:33	0:31	0.35%
Australia	Hobart	12:52:04	13:24:31	13:56:21	1:04	3.52%
Australia	Launceston	12:55:45	13:24:31	13:52:49	0:57	2.36%
Australia	Bairnsdale	13:17:13	13:25:56	13:34:34	0:17	0.06%
Australia	Macquarie Island	12:54:09	13:33:42	14:12:10	1:18	9.20%
New Zealand	Oban	15:43:43	15:48:29	15:53:13	0:10	0.01%

== Eclipse details ==
Shown below are two tables displaying details about this particular solar eclipse. The first table outlines times at which the Moon's penumbra or umbra attains the specific parameter, and the second table describes various other parameters pertaining to this eclipse.

July 13, 2018 Solar Eclipse Times
Event	Time (UTC)
First Penumbral External Contact	2018 July 13 at 01:49:32.3 UTC
Ecliptic Conjunction	2018 July 13 at 02:49:01.2 UTC
Greatest Eclipse	2018 July 13 at 03:02:16.1 UTC
Equatorial Conjunction	2018 July 13 at 03:10:13.3 UTC
Last Penumbral External Contact	2018 July 13 at 04:14:55.9 UTC

July 13, 2018 Solar Eclipse Parameters
Parameter	Value
Eclipse Magnitude	0.33654
Eclipse Obscuration	0.22578
Gamma	−1.35423
Sun Right Ascension	07h29m31.1s
Sun Declination	+21°50'30.6"
Sun Semi-Diameter	15'44.0"
Sun Equatorial Horizontal Parallax	08.7"
Moon Right Ascension	07h29m10.9s
Moon Declination	+20°27'46.1"
Moon Semi-Diameter	16'42.8"
Moon Equatorial Horizontal Parallax	1°01'20.4"
ΔT	69.2 s

== Eclipse season ==
This eclipse is part of an eclipse season, a period, roughly every six months, when eclipses occur. Only two (or occasionally three) eclipse seasons occur each year, and each season lasts about 35 days and repeats just short of six months (173 days) later; thus two full eclipse seasons always occur each year. Either two or three eclipses happen each eclipse season. In the sequence below, each eclipse is separated by a fortnight. The first and last eclipse in this sequence is separated by one synodic month.

Eclipse season of July–August 2018
July 13 Ascending node (new moon)	July 27 Descending node (full moon)	August 11 Ascending node (new moon)
Partial solar eclipse Solar Saros 117	Total lunar eclipse Lunar Saros 129	Partial solar eclipse Solar Saros 155

== Related eclipses ==
=== Eclipses in 2018 ===
- A total lunar eclipse on January 31.
- A partial solar eclipse on February 15.
- A partial solar eclipse on July 13.
- A total lunar eclipse on July 27.
- A partial solar eclipse on August 11.

=== Metonic ===
- Followed by: Solar eclipse of April 30, 2022

=== Half-Saros ===
- Preceded by: Lunar eclipse of July 7, 2009
- Followed by: Lunar eclipse of July 18, 2027

=== Tritos ===
- Followed by: Solar eclipse of June 12, 2029

=== Solar Saros 117 ===
- Preceded by: Solar eclipse of July 1, 2000
- Followed by: Solar eclipse of July 23, 2036

=== Inex ===
- Followed by: Solar eclipse of June 23, 2047

=== Triad ===
- Preceded by: Solar eclipse of September 12, 1931
- Followed by: Solar eclipse of May 14, 2105

=== Solar eclipses of 2018–2021 ===
This eclipse is a member of a semester series. An eclipse in a semester series of solar eclipses repeats approximately every 177 days and 4 hours (a semester) at alternating nodes of the Moon's orbit.

The partial solar eclipses on February 15, 2018 and August 11, 2018 occur in the previous lunar year eclipse set.

Solar eclipse series sets from 2018 to 2021
Ascending node			Descending node		
Saros	Map	Gamma	Saros	Map	Gamma
117 Partial in Melbourne, Australia	July 13, 2018 Partial	−1.35423	122 Partial in Nakhodka, Russia	January 6, 2019 Partial	1.14174
127 Totality in La Serena, Chile	July 2, 2019 Total	−0.64656	132 Annularity in Jaffna, Sri Lanka	December 26, 2019 Annular	0.41351
137 Annularity in Beigang, Yunlin, Taiwan	June 21, 2020 Annular	0.12090	142 Totality in Gorbea, Chile	December 14, 2020 Total	−0.29394
147 Partial in Halifax, Canada	June 10, 2021 Annular	0.91516	152 From HMS Protector off South Georgia	December 4, 2021 Total	−0.95261

=== Saros 117 ===
This eclipse is a part of Saros series 117, repeating every 18 years, 11 days, and containing 71 events. The series started with a partial solar eclipse on June 24, 792 AD. It contains annular eclipses from September 18, 936 AD through May 14, 1333; hybrid eclipses from May 25, 1351 through July 8, 1423; and total eclipses from July 18, 1441 through May 19, 1928. The series ends at member 71 as a partial eclipse on August 3, 2054. Its eclipses are tabulated in three columns; every third eclipse in the same column is one exeligmos apart, so they all cast shadows over approximately the same parts of the Earth.

The longest duration of annularity was produced by member 16 at 9 minutes, 26 seconds on December 3, 1062, and the longest duration of totality was produced by member 62 at 4 minutes, 19 seconds on April 26, 1892. All eclipses in this series occur at the Moon’s ascending node of orbit.

Series members 57–71 occur between 1801 and 2054:
57	58	59
March 4, 1802	March 14, 1820	March 25, 1838
60	61	62
April 5, 1856	April 16, 1874	April 26, 1892
63	64	65
May 9, 1910	May 19, 1928	May 30, 1946
66	67	68
June 10, 1964	June 21, 1982	July 1, 2000
69	70	71
July 13, 2018	July 23, 2036	August 3, 2054

=== Metonic series ===
The metonic series repeats eclipses every 19 years (6939.69 days), lasting about 5 cycles. Eclipses occur in nearly the same calendar date. In addition, the octon subseries repeats 1/5 of that or every 3.8 years (1387.94 days). All eclipses in this table occur at the Moon's ascending node.

21 eclipse events between July 13, 2018 and July 12, 2094
July 12–13	April 30–May 1	February 16–17	December 5–6	September 22–23
117	119	121	123	125
July 13, 2018	April 30, 2022	February 17, 2026	December 5, 2029	September 23, 2033
127	129	131	133	135
July 13, 2037	April 30, 2041	February 16, 2045	December 5, 2048	September 22, 2052
137	139	141	143	145
July 12, 2056	April 30, 2060	February 17, 2064	December 6, 2067	September 23, 2071
147	149	151	153	155
July 13, 2075	May 1, 2079	February 16, 2083	December 6, 2086	September 23, 2090
157
July 12, 2094

=== Tritos series ===
This eclipse is a part of a tritos cycle, repeating at alternating nodes every 135 synodic months (≈ 3986.63 days, or 11 years minus 1 month). Their appearance and longitude are irregular due to a lack of synchronization with the anomalistic month (period of perigee), but groupings of 3 tritos cycles (≈ 33 years minus 3 months) come close (≈ 434.044 anomalistic months), so eclipses are similar in these groupings.

Series members between 2018 and 2200
July 13, 2018 (Saros 117)	June 12, 2029 (Saros 118)	May 11, 2040 (Saros 119)	April 11, 2051 (Saros 120)	March 11, 2062 (Saros 121)
February 7, 2073 (Saros 122)	January 7, 2084 (Saros 123)	December 7, 2094 (Saros 124)	November 6, 2105 (Saros 125)	October 6, 2116 (Saros 126)
September 6, 2127 (Saros 127)	August 5, 2138 (Saros 128)	July 5, 2149 (Saros 129)	June 4, 2160 (Saros 130)	May 5, 2171 (Saros 131)
April 3, 2182 (Saros 132)	March 3, 2193 (Saros 133)			

=== Inex series ===
This eclipse is a part of the long period inex cycle, repeating at alternating nodes, every 358 synodic months (≈ 10,571.95 days, or 29 years minus 20 days). Their appearance and longitude are irregular due to a lack of synchronization with the anomalistic month (period of perigee). However, groupings of 3 inex cycles (≈ 87 years minus 2 months) comes close (≈ 1,151.02 anomalistic months), so eclipses are similar in these groupings.

Series members between 1844 and 2200
November 10, 1844 (Saros 111)		
September 12, 1931 (Saros 114)		
July 13, 2018 (Saros 117)	June 23, 2047 (Saros 118)	June 1, 2076 (Saros 119)
May 14, 2105 (Saros 120)	April 24, 2134 (Saros 121)	April 3, 2163 (Saros 122)
March 13, 2192 (Saros 123)		
