= Solar eclipse of December 25, 1935 =

20th-century annular solar eclipse

- Annular eclipse
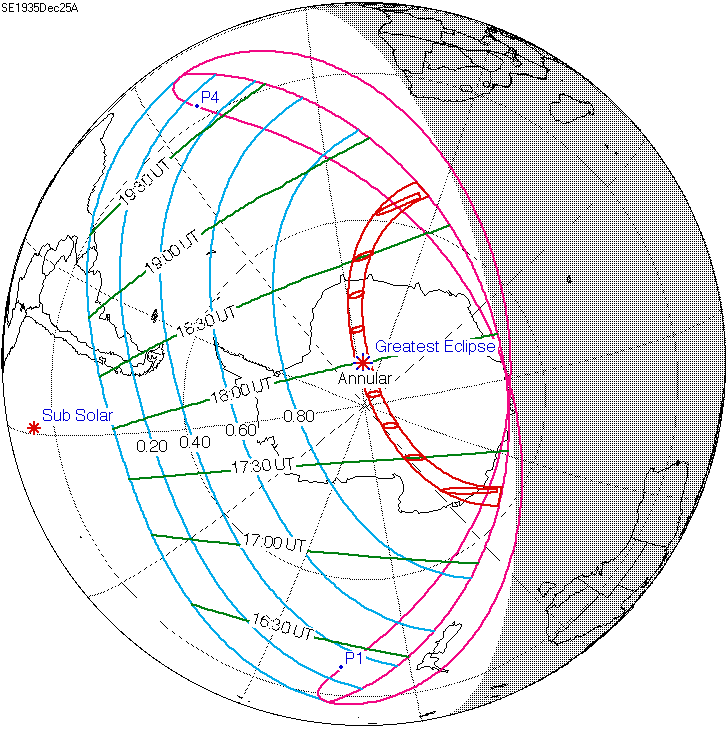
- Map
- Gamma: −0.9228
- Magnitude: 0.9752

Maximum eclipse
- Duration: 90 s (1 min 30 s)
- Coordinates: 83.5°S 9.4°E
- Max. width of band: 234 km (145 mi)

Times (UTC)
- Greatest eclipse: 17:59:52

References
- Saros: 121 (56 of 71)
- Catalog # (SE5000): 9366

An annular solar eclipse occurred at the Moon's ascending node of orbit on Wednesday, December 25, 1935, with a magnitude of 0.9752. A solar eclipse occurs when the Moon passes between Earth and the Sun, thereby totally or partly obscuring the image of the Sun for a viewer on Earth. An annular solar eclipse occurs when the Moon's apparent diameter is smaller than the Sun's, blocking most of the Sun's light and causing the Sun to look like an annulus (ring). An annular eclipse appears as a partial eclipse over a region of the Earth thousands of kilometres wide. The Moon's apparent diameter was near the average diameter because it occurred 7.7 days after apogee (on December 18, 1935, at 2:40 UTC) and 4.8 days before perigee (on December 30, 1935, at 15:10 UTC).

This was the last of five solar eclipses in 1935, with the others occurring on January 5, February 3, June 30, and July 30. The next time this will occur is 2206.

Annularity was visible from parts of Antarctica. A partial eclipse was visible for parts of Antarctica, southern South America, and New Zealand.

It was the first solar eclipse to fall on Christmas Day since 1685, and the last until the 1954 eclipse.

== Eclipse details ==
Shown below are two tables displaying details about this particular solar eclipse. The first table outlines times at which the Moon's penumbra or umbra attains the specific parameter, and the second table describes various other parameters pertaining to this eclipse.

December 25, 1935 Solar Eclipse Times
Event	Time (UTC)
First Penumbral External Contact	1935 December 25 at 15:42:21.2 UTC
First Umbral External Contact	1935 December 25 at 17:15:44.8 UTC
First Central Line	1935 December 25 at 17:18:14.4 UTC
Greatest Duration	1935 December 25 at 17:18:14.4 UTC
First Umbral Internal Contact	1935 December 25 at 17:20:52.1 UTC
Equatorial Conjunction	1935 December 25 at 17:47:27.1 UTC
Ecliptic Conjunction	1935 December 25 at 17:49:48.0 UTC
Greatest Eclipse	1935 December 25 at 17:59:51.8 UTC
Last Umbral Internal Contact	1935 December 25 at 18:39:02.7 UTC
Last Central Line	1935 December 25 at 18:41:37.4 UTC
Last Umbral External Contact	1935 December 25 at 18:44:04.0 UTC
Last Penumbral External Contact	1935 December 25 at 20:17:22.0 UTC

December 25, 1935 Solar Eclipse Parameters
Parameter	Value
Eclipse Magnitude	0.97525
Eclipse Obscuration	0.95112
Gamma	−0.92279
Sun Right Ascension	18h13m12.8s
Sun Declination	-23°24'47.6"
Sun Semi-Diameter	16'15.8"
Sun Equatorial Horizontal Parallax	08.9"
Moon Right Ascension	18h13m41.2s
Moon Declination	-24°17'40.0"
Moon Semi-Diameter	15'46.2"
Moon Equatorial Horizontal Parallax	0°57'52.6"
ΔT	23.7 s

== Eclipse season ==
This eclipse is part of an eclipse season, a period, roughly every six months, when eclipses occur. Only two (or occasionally three) eclipse seasons occur each year, and each season lasts about 35 days and repeats just short of six months (173 days) later; thus two full eclipse seasons always occur each year. Either two or three eclipses happen each eclipse season. In the sequence below, each eclipse is separated by a fortnight.

Eclipse season of December 1935–January 1936
December 25 Ascending node (new moon)	January 8 Descending node (full moon)
Annular solar eclipse Solar Saros 121	Total lunar eclipse Lunar Saros 133

== Related eclipses ==
=== Eclipses in 1935 ===
- A partial solar eclipse on January 5.
- A total lunar eclipse on January 19.
- A partial solar eclipse on February 3.
- A partial solar eclipse on June 30.
- A total lunar eclipse on July 16.
- A partial solar eclipse on July 30.
- An annular solar eclipse on December 25.

=== Metonic ===
- Preceded by: Solar eclipse of March 7, 1932
- Followed by: Solar eclipse of October 12, 1939

=== Tzolkinex ===
- Preceded by: Solar eclipse of November 12, 1928
- Followed by: Solar eclipse of February 4, 1943

=== Half-Saros ===
- Preceded by: Lunar eclipse of December 19, 1926
- Followed by: Lunar eclipse of December 29, 1944

=== Tritos ===
- Preceded by: Solar eclipse of January 24, 1925
- Followed by: Solar eclipse of November 23, 1946

=== Solar Saros 121 ===
- Preceded by: Solar eclipse of December 14, 1917
- Followed by: Solar eclipse of January 5, 1954

=== Inex ===
- Preceded by: Solar eclipse of January 14, 1907
- Followed by: Solar eclipse of December 4, 1964

=== Triad ===
- Preceded by: Solar eclipse of February 23, 1849
- Followed by: Solar eclipse of October 25, 2022

=== Solar eclipses of 1935–1938 ===
This eclipse is a member of a semester series. An eclipse in a semester series of solar eclipses repeats approximately every 177 days and 4 hours (a semester) at alternating nodes of the Moon's orbit.

The partial solar eclipses on February 3, 1935 and July 30, 1935 occur in the previous lunar year eclipse set.

Solar eclipse series sets from 1935 to 1938
Ascending node			Descending node		
Saros	Map	Gamma	Saros	Map	Gamma
111	January 5, 1935 Partial	−1.5381	116	June 30, 1935 Partial	1.3623
121	December 25, 1935 Annular	−0.9228	126	June 19, 1936 Total	0.5389
131	December 13, 1936 Annular	−0.2493	136 Totality in Kanton Island, Kiribati	June 8, 1937 Total	−0.2253
141	December 2, 1937 Annular	0.4389	146	May 29, 1938 Total	−0.9607
151	November 21, 1938 Partial	1.1077			

=== Saros 121 ===
This eclipse is a part of Saros series 121, repeating every 18 years, 11 days, and containing 71 events. The series started with a partial solar eclipse on April 25, 944 AD. It contains total eclipses from July 10, 1070 through October 9, 1809; hybrid eclipses on October 20, 1827 and October 30, 1845; and annular eclipses from November 11, 1863 through February 28, 2044. The series ends at member 71 as a partial eclipse on June 7, 2206. Its eclipses are tabulated in three columns; every third eclipse in the same column is one exeligmos apart, so they all cast shadows over approximately the same parts of the Earth.

The longest duration of totality was produced by member 39 at 6 minutes, 20 seconds on June 21, 1629, and the longest duration of annularity will be produced by member 62 at 2 minutes, 27 seconds on February 28, 2044. All eclipses in this series occur at the Moon’s ascending node of orbit.

Series members 49–70 occur between 1801 and 2200:
49	50	51
October 9, 1809	October 20, 1827	October 30, 1845
52	53	54
November 11, 1863	November 21, 1881	December 3, 1899
55	56	57
December 14, 1917	December 25, 1935	January 5, 1954
58	59	60
January 16, 1972	January 26, 1990	February 7, 2008
61	62	63
February 17, 2026	February 28, 2044	March 11, 2062
64	65	66
March 21, 2080	April 1, 2098	April 13, 2116
67	68	69
April 24, 2134	May 4, 2152	May 16, 2170
70
May 26, 2188

=== Metonic series ===
The metonic series repeats eclipses every 19 years (6939.69 days), lasting about 5 cycles. Eclipses occur in nearly the same calendar date. In addition, the octon subseries repeats 1/5 of that or every 3.8 years (1387.94 days). All eclipses in this table occur at the Moon's ascending node.

22 eclipse events between December 24, 1916 and July 31, 2000
December 24–25	October 12	July 31–August 1	May 19–20	March 7
111	113	115	117	119
December 24, 1916		July 31, 1924	May 19, 1928	March 7, 1932
121	123	125	127	129
December 25, 1935	October 12, 1939	August 1, 1943	May 20, 1947	March 7, 1951
131	133	135	137	139
December 25, 1954	October 12, 1958	July 31, 1962	May 20, 1966	March 7, 1970
141	143	145	147	149
December 24, 1973	October 12, 1977	July 31, 1981	May 19, 1985	March 7, 1989
151	153	155		
December 24, 1992	October 12, 1996	July 31, 2000		

=== Tritos series ===
This eclipse is a part of a tritos cycle, repeating at alternating nodes every 135 synodic months (≈ 3986.63 days, or 11 years minus 1 month). Their appearance and longitude are irregular due to a lack of synchronization with the anomalistic month (period of perigee), but groupings of 3 tritos cycles (≈ 33 years minus 3 months) come close (≈ 434.044 anomalistic months), so eclipses are similar in these groupings.

Series members between 1801 and 2200
January 1, 1805 (Saros 109)		October 31, 1826 (Saros 111)		August 28, 1848 (Saros 113)
July 29, 1859 (Saros 114)	June 28, 1870 (Saros 115)	May 27, 1881 (Saros 116)	April 26, 1892 (Saros 117)	March 29, 1903 (Saros 118)
February 25, 1914 (Saros 119)	January 24, 1925 (Saros 120)	December 25, 1935 (Saros 121)	November 23, 1946 (Saros 122)	October 23, 1957 (Saros 123)
September 22, 1968 (Saros 124)	August 22, 1979 (Saros 125)	July 22, 1990 (Saros 126)	June 21, 2001 (Saros 127)	May 20, 2012 (Saros 128)
April 20, 2023 (Saros 129)	March 20, 2034 (Saros 130)	February 16, 2045 (Saros 131)	January 16, 2056 (Saros 132)	December 17, 2066 (Saros 133)
November 15, 2077 (Saros 134)	October 14, 2088 (Saros 135)	September 14, 2099 (Saros 136)	August 15, 2110 (Saros 137)	July 14, 2121 (Saros 138)
June 13, 2132 (Saros 139)	May 14, 2143 (Saros 140)	April 12, 2154 (Saros 141)	March 12, 2165 (Saros 142)	February 10, 2176 (Saros 143)
January 9, 2187 (Saros 144)	December 9, 2197 (Saros 145)			

=== Inex series ===
This eclipse is a part of the long period inex cycle, repeating at alternating nodes, every 358 synodic months (≈ 10,571.95 days, or 29 years minus 20 days). Their appearance and longitude are irregular due to a lack of synchronization with the anomalistic month (period of perigee). However, groupings of 3 inex cycles (≈ 87 years minus 2 months) comes close (≈ 1,151.02 anomalistic months), so eclipses are similar in these groupings.

Series members between 1801 and 2200
March 14, 1820 (Saros 117)	February 23, 1849 (Saros 118)	February 2, 1878 (Saros 119)
January 14, 1907 (Saros 120)	December 25, 1935 (Saros 121)	December 4, 1964 (Saros 122)
November 13, 1993 (Saros 123)	October 25, 2022 (Saros 124)	October 4, 2051 (Saros 125)
September 13, 2080 (Saros 126)	August 26, 2109 (Saros 127)	August 5, 2138 (Saros 128)
July 16, 2167 (Saros 129)	June 26, 2196 (Saros 130)	
