= Solar eclipse of January 16, 2037 =

Future partial solar eclipse

- Partial eclipse
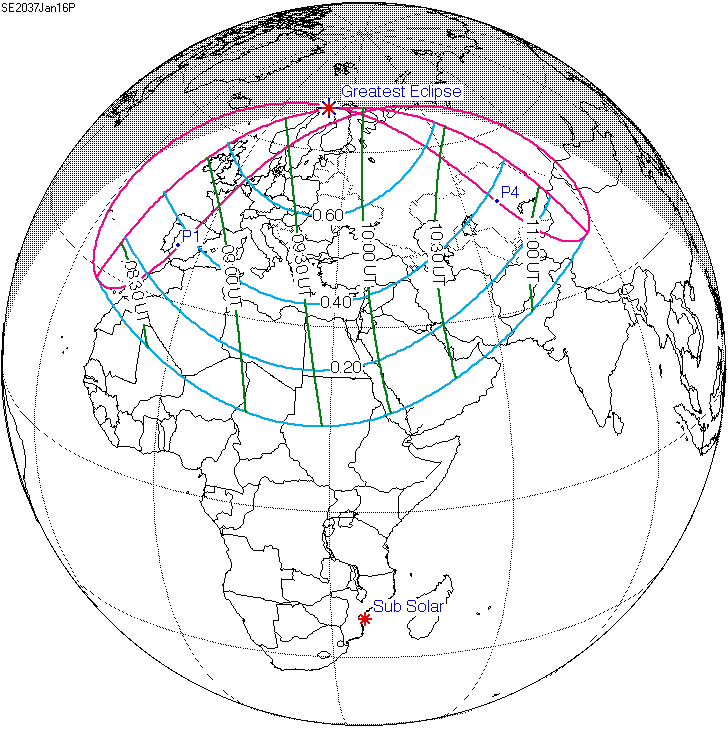
- Map
- Gamma: 1.1477
- Magnitude: 0.7049

Maximum eclipse
- Coordinates: 68.5°N 20.8°E

Times (UTC)
- Greatest eclipse: 9:48:55

References
- Saros: 122 (59 of 70)
- Catalog # (SE5000): 9590

A partial solar eclipse will occur at the Moon's descending node of orbit on Friday, January 16, 2037, with a magnitude of 0.7049. A solar eclipse occurs when the Moon passes between Earth and the Sun, thereby totally or partly obscuring the image of the Sun for a viewer on Earth. A partial solar eclipse occurs in the polar regions of the Earth when the center of the Moon's shadow misses the Earth.

A partial eclipse will be visible for parts of Europe, North Africa, the Middle East, and Central Asia.

== Images ==
Animated path

== Eclipse timing ==
=== Places experiencing partial eclipse ===
Solar Eclipse of January 16, 2037 (Local Times)
Country or territory	City or place	Start of partial eclipse	Maximum eclipse	End of partial eclipse	Duration of eclipse (hr:min)	Maximum coverage
Ireland	Dublin	08:31:00 (sunrise)	09:03:48	10:22:49	1:52	45.38%
France	Paris	08:49:44	10:06:16	11:30:46	2:41	44.19%
Isle of Man	Douglas	08:27:44 (sunrise)	09:06:36	10:26:47	1:59	47.28%
United Kingdom	London	07:58:13 (sunrise)	09:07:03	10:29:58	2:32	46.34%
Belgium	Brussels	08:53:05	10:11:21	11:37:03	2:44	47.65%
Luxembourg	Luxembourg	08:52:46	10:12:02	11:38:55	2:46	46.92%
Switzerland	Zurich	08:52:06	10:12:40	11:41:08	2:49	45.06%
Italy	Rome	08:50:55	10:12:57	11:43:26	2:53	38.85%
Netherlands	Amsterdam	08:55:17	10:14:01	11:39:45	2:44	49.64%
Croatia	Zagreb	08:57:29	10:22:57	11:55:12	2:58	45.47%
Czech Republic	Prague	09:00:08	10:24:34	11:55:09	2:55	50.26%
Germany	Berlin	09:01:59	10:25:30	11:54:47	2:53	52.55%
Austria	Vienna	09:00:11	10:25:53	11:57:42	2:58	48.54%
Slovakia	Bratislava	09:00:57	10:27:05	11:59:07	2:58	48.62%
Denmark	Copenhagen	09:05:19	10:27:44	11:55:15	2:50	55.20%
Hungary	Budapest	09:02:36	10:29:52	12:02:34	3:00	48.14%
Norway	Oslo	09:09:48	10:30:08	11:54:47	2:45	57.75%
Serbia	Belgrade	09:02:07	10:30:16	12:03:53	3:02	44.94%
Bulgaria	Sofia	10:04:45	11:34:21	13:08:33	3:04	42.25%
Poland	Warsaw	09:09:48	10:36:55	12:07:51	2:58	53.38%
Sweden	Stockholm	09:15:09	10:38:15	12:04:32	2:49	58.47%
Romania	Bucharest	10:10:13	11:41:05	13:14:57	3:05	44.51%
Latvia	Riga	10:18:41	11:44:43	13:12:51	2:54	57.16%
Lithuania	Vilnius	10:17:45	11:45:14	13:14:46	2:57	55.44%
Estonia	Tallinn	10:22:09	11:46:54	13:13:19	2:51	58.60%
Finland	Helsinki	10:23:09	11:47:31	13:13:24	2:50	58.95%
Moldova	Chișinău	10:16:29	11:47:48	13:20:32	3:04	47.39%
Belarus	Minsk	11:20:02	12:48:26	14:18:13	2:58	54.59%
Ukraine	Kyiv	10:21:38	11:52:10	13:23:11	3:02	50.86%
Russia	Moscow	11:36:17	13:04:21	14:30:35	2:54	53.66%

== Eclipse details ==
Shown below are two tables displaying details about this particular solar eclipse. The first table outlines times at which the Moon's penumbra or umbra attains the specific parameter, and the second table describes various other parameters pertaining to this eclipse.

January 16, 2037 Solar Eclipse Times
Event	Time (UTC)
First Penumbral External Contact	2037 January 16 at 07:42:39.8 UTC
Ecliptic Conjunction	2037 January 16 at 09:35:36.0 UTC
Greatest Eclipse	2037 January 16 at 09:48:55.1 UTC
Equatorial Conjunction	2037 January 16 at 10:01:35.5 UTC
Last Penumbral External Contact	2037 January 16 at 11:55:08.4 UTC

January 16, 2037 Solar Eclipse Parameters
Parameter	Value
Eclipse Magnitude	0.70493
Eclipse Obscuration	0.60942
Gamma	1.14772
Sun Right Ascension	19h54m30.1s
Sun Declination	-20°49'43.5"
Sun Semi-Diameter	16'15.5"
Sun Equatorial Horizontal Parallax	08.9"
Moon Right Ascension	19h54m05.4s
Moon Declination	-19°47'33.7"
Moon Semi-Diameter	14'51.8"
Moon Equatorial Horizontal Parallax	0°54'32.8"
ΔT	77.1 s

== Eclipse season ==
This eclipse is part of an eclipse season, a period, roughly every six months, when eclipses occur. Only two (or occasionally three) eclipse seasons occur each year, and each season lasts about 35 days and repeats just short of six months (173 days) later; thus two full eclipse seasons always occur each year. Either two or three eclipses happen each eclipse season. In the sequence below, each eclipse is separated by a fortnight.

Eclipse season of January 2037
January 16 Descending node (new moon)	January 31 Ascending node (full moon)
Partial solar eclipse Solar Saros 122	Total lunar eclipse Lunar Saros 134

== Related eclipses ==
=== Eclipses in 2037 ===
- A partial solar eclipse on January 16.
- A total lunar eclipse on January 31.
- A total solar eclipse on July 13.
- A partial lunar eclipse on July 27.

=== Metonic ===
- Preceded by: Solar eclipse of March 30, 2033
- Followed by: Solar eclipse of November 4, 2040

=== Tzolkinex ===
- Preceded by: Solar eclipse of December 5, 2029
- Followed by: Solar eclipse of February 28, 2044

=== Half-Saros ===
- Preceded by: Lunar eclipse of January 12, 2028
- Followed by: Lunar eclipse of January 22, 2046

=== Tritos ===
- Preceded by: Solar eclipse of February 17, 2026
- Followed by: Solar eclipse of December 16, 2047

=== Solar Saros 122 ===
- Preceded by: Solar eclipse of January 6, 2019
- Followed by: Solar eclipse of January 27, 2055

=== Inex ===
- Preceded by: Solar eclipse of February 7, 2008
- Followed by: Solar eclipse of December 27, 2065

=== Triad ===
- Preceded by: Solar eclipse of March 18, 1950
- Followed by: Solar eclipse of November 18, 2123

=== Solar eclipses of 2036–2039 ===
This eclipse is a member of a semester series. An eclipse in a semester series of solar eclipses repeats approximately every 177 days and 4 hours (a semester) at alternating nodes of the Moon's orbit.

The partial solar eclipses on February 27, 2036 and August 21, 2036 occur in the previous lunar year eclipse set.

Solar eclipse series sets from 2036 to 2039
Ascending node			Descending node		
Saros	Map	Gamma	Saros	Map	Gamma
117	July 23, 2036 Partial	−1.425	122	January 16, 2037 Partial	1.1477
127	July 13, 2037 Total	−0.7246	132	January 5, 2038 Annular	0.4169
137	July 2, 2038 Annular	0.0398	142	December 26, 2038 Total	−0.2881
147	June 21, 2039 Annular	0.8312	152	December 15, 2039 Total	−0.9458

=== Saros 122 ===
This eclipse is a part of Saros series 122, repeating every 18 years, 11 days, and containing 70 events. The series started with a partial solar eclipse on April 17, 991 AD. It contains total eclipses from July 12, 1135 through August 3, 1171; hybrid eclipses on August 13, 1189 and August 25, 1207; and annular eclipses from September 4, 1225 through October 10, 1874. The series ends at member 70 as a partial eclipse on May 17, 2235. Its eclipses are tabulated in three columns; every third eclipse in the same column is one exeligmos apart, so they all cast shadows over approximately the same parts of the Earth.

The longest duration of totality was produced by member 9 at 1 minutes, 25 seconds on July 12, 1135, and the longest duration of annularity was produced by member 50 at 6 minutes, 28 seconds on October 10, 1874. All eclipses in this series occur at the Moon’s descending node of orbit.

Series members 46–68 occur between 1801 and 2200:
46	47	48
August 28, 1802	September 7, 1820	September 18, 1838
49	50	51
September 29, 1856	October 10, 1874	October 20, 1892
52	53	54
November 2, 1910	November 12, 1928	November 23, 1946
55	56	57
December 4, 1964	December 15, 1982	December 25, 2000
58	59	60
January 6, 2019	January 16, 2037	January 27, 2055
61	62	63
February 7, 2073	February 18, 2091	March 1, 2109
64	65	66
March 13, 2127	March 23, 2145	April 3, 2163
67	68	
April 14, 2181	April 25, 2199	

=== Metonic series ===
The metonic series repeats eclipses every 19 years (6939.69 days), lasting about 5 cycles. Eclipses occur in nearly the same calendar date. In addition, the octon subseries repeats 1/5 of that or every 3.8 years (1387.94 days). All eclipses in this table occur at the Moon's descending node.

22 eclipse events between June 12, 2029 and November 4, 2116
June 11–12	March 30–31	January 16	November 4–5	August 23–24
118	120	122	124	126
June 12, 2029	March 30, 2033	January 16, 2037	November 4, 2040	August 23, 2044
128	130	132	134	136
June 11, 2048	March 30, 2052	January 16, 2056	November 5, 2059	August 24, 2063
138	140	142	144	146
June 11, 2067	March 31, 2071	January 16, 2075	November 4, 2078	August 24, 2082
148	150	152	154	156
June 11, 2086	March 31, 2090	January 16, 2094	November 4, 2097	August 24, 2101
158	160	162	164	
June 12, 2105			November 4, 2116	

=== Tritos series ===
This eclipse is a part of a tritos cycle, repeating at alternating nodes every 135 synodic months (≈ 3986.63 days, or 11 years minus 1 month). Their appearance and longitude are irregular due to a lack of synchronization with the anomalistic month (period of perigee), but groupings of 3 tritos cycles (≈ 33 years minus 3 months) come close (≈ 434.044 anomalistic months), so eclipses are similar in these groupings.

The partial solar eclipses on March 27, 1884 (part of Saros 108) and December 24, 1916 (part of Saros 111) are also a part of this series but are not included in the table below.

Series members between 1971 and 2200
July 22, 1971 (Saros 116)	June 21, 1982 (Saros 117)	May 21, 1993 (Saros 118)	April 19, 2004 (Saros 119)	March 20, 2015 (Saros 120)
February 17, 2026 (Saros 121)	January 16, 2037 (Saros 122)	December 16, 2047 (Saros 123)	November 16, 2058 (Saros 124)	October 15, 2069 (Saros 125)
September 13, 2080 (Saros 126)	August 15, 2091 (Saros 127)	July 15, 2102 (Saros 128)	June 13, 2113 (Saros 129)	May 14, 2124 (Saros 130)
April 13, 2135 (Saros 131)	March 12, 2146 (Saros 132)	February 9, 2157 (Saros 133)	January 10, 2168 (Saros 134)	December 9, 2178 (Saros 135)
November 8, 2189 (Saros 136)	October 9, 2200 (Saros 137)			

=== Inex series ===
This eclipse is a part of the long period inex cycle, repeating at alternating nodes, every 358 synodic months (≈ 10,571.95 days, or 29 years minus 20 days). Their appearance and longitude are irregular due to a lack of synchronization with the anomalistic month (period of perigee). However, groupings of 3 inex cycles (≈ 87 years minus 2 months) comes close (≈ 1,151.02 anomalistic months), so eclipses are similar in these groupings.

Series members between 1801 and 2200
June 26, 1805 (Saros 114)	June 7, 1834 (Saros 115)	May 17, 1863 (Saros 116)
April 26, 1892 (Saros 117)	April 8, 1921 (Saros 118)	March 18, 1950 (Saros 119)
February 26, 1979 (Saros 120)	February 7, 2008 (Saros 121)	January 16, 2037 (Saros 122)
December 27, 2065 (Saros 123)	December 7, 2094 (Saros 124)	November 18, 2123 (Saros 125)
October 28, 2152 (Saros 126)	October 8, 2181 (Saros 127)	
