= Solar eclipse of February 28, 2044 =

Future annular solar eclipse

- Annular eclipse
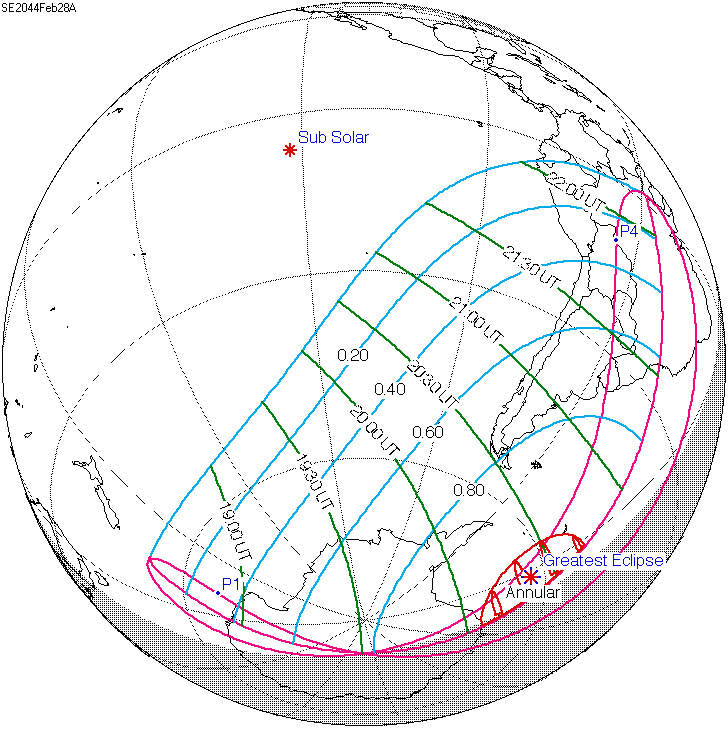
- Map
- Gamma: −0.9954
- Magnitude: 0.96

Maximum eclipse
- Duration: 147 s (2 min 27 s)
- Coordinates: 62.2°S 25.6°W
- Max. width of band: km

Times (UTC)
- Greatest eclipse: 20:24:40

References
- Saros: 121 (62 of 71)
- Catalog # (SE5000): 9605

An annular solar eclipse will occur at the Moon's ascending node of orbit on Sunday, February 28, 2044, with a magnitude of 0.96. A solar eclipse occurs when the Moon passes between Earth and the Sun, thereby totally or partly obscuring the image of the Sun for a viewer on Earth. An annular solar eclipse occurs when the Moon's apparent diameter is smaller than the Sun's, blocking most of the Sun's light and causing the Sun to look like an annulus (ring). An annular eclipse appears as a partial eclipse over a region of the Earth thousands of kilometres wide. Occurring about 6.7 days after apogee (on February 22, 2044, at 5:20 UTC), the Moon's apparent diameter will be smaller.

While the path of annularity will be not visible from any major land areas, a partial solar eclipse will be visible for parts of Antarctica and much of South America. This will be the last of 55 umbral eclipses in Solar Saros 121.

== Images ==
Animated path

== Eclipse timing ==
=== Places experiencing partial eclipse ===
Solar Eclipse of February 28, 2044 (Local Times)
Country or territory	City or place	Start of partial eclipse	Maximum eclipse	End of partial eclipse	Duration of eclipse (hr:min)	Maximum coverage
Antarctica	Orcadas Base	16:21:09	17:26:56	18:29:05	2:08	91.12%
Chile	Punta Arenas	16:22:40	17:34:49	18:42:05	2:19	72.14%
South Georgia and the South Sandwich Islands	King Edward Point	17:36:24	18:39:37	19:28:33 (sunset)	1:52	92.18%
Falkland Islands	Stanley	16:33:56	17:42:58	18:47:05	2:13	82.00%
Argentina	Neuquén	16:56:00	18:05:49	19:09:31	2:14	62.11%
Argentina	Mar del Plata	17:03:47	18:10:26	19:11:21	2:08	69.65%
Chile	Santiago	17:07:55	18:16:01	19:17:55	2:10	52.19%
Uruguay	Montevideo	17:11:15	18:16:24	19:15:56	2:05	66.28%
Argentina	Buenos Aires	17:11:04	18:16:45	19:16:42	2:06	64.41%
Argentina	Mendoza	17:10:14	18:17:46	19:19:07	2:09	53.21%
Argentina	Rosario	17:13:54	18:19:33	19:19:22	2:05	60.33%
Brazil	Rio de Janeiro	17:38:34	18:19:54	18:22:15 (sunset)	0:44	42.46%
Argentina	Córdoba	17:16:02	18:21:50	19:21:41	2:06	55.18%
Uruguay	Tacuarembó	17:18:26	18:22:11	19:19:51 (sunset)	2:01	61.49%
Uruguay	Rivera	17:20:24	18:23:38	19:17:26 (sunset)	1:57	60.41%
Brazil	Porto Alegre	17:23:20	18:24:53	18:59:32 (sunset)	1:36	61.15%
Brazil	Criciúma	17:26:32	18:26:51	18:51:04 (sunset)	1:25	59.51%
Paraguay	Ciudad del Este	17:32:41	18:32:39	19:09:42 (sunset)	1:37	51.28%
Paraguay	Asunción	17:32:39	18:33:14	19:21:38 (sunset)	1:49	49.22%
Argentina	Salta	17:31:55	18:33:41	19:29:56	1:58	42.98%
Brazil	São Paulo	17:37:33	18:34:04	18:36:26 (sunset)	0:59	50.44%
Brazil	Brasília	17:54:29	18:34:10	18:36:26 (sunset)	0:42	30.29%
Bolivia	Sucre	16:46:51	17:43:21	18:35:03	1:48	32.28%
Bolivia	Cochabamba	16:51:13	17:45:54	18:36:04	1:45	28.48%
Bolivia	La Paz	16:53:39	17:47:11	18:36:21	1:43	25.37%
Peru	Lima	16:09:31	16:52:59	17:33:28	1:24	10.77%
Brazil	Rio Branco	16:13:23	16:56:44	17:37:08	1:24	13.37%
Brazil	Manaus	17:34:02	18:03:35	18:17:39 (sunset)	0:44	4.96%
Colombia	Leticia	16:36:36	17:04:13	17:30:37	0:54	3.29%
Peru	Iquitos	16:42:50	17:04:57	17:26:16	0:43	1.58%

== Eclipse details ==
Shown below are two tables displaying details about this particular solar eclipse. The first table outlines times at which the Moon's penumbra or umbra attains the specific parameter, and the second table describes various other parameters pertaining to this eclipse.

February 28, 2044 Solar Eclipse Times
Event	Time (UTC)
First Penumbral External Contact	2044 February 28 at 18:10:40.7 UTC
Equatorial Conjunction	2044 February 28 at 19:25:50.0 UTC
First Umbral External Contact	2044 February 28 at 20:06:18.0 UTC
Ecliptic Conjunction	2044 February 28 at 20:13:36.1 UTC
First Central Line	2044 February 28 at 20:17:45.9 UTC
Greatest Duration	2044 February 28 at 20:17:45.9 UTC
Greatest Eclipse	2044 February 28 at 20:24:39.5 UTC
Last Central Line	2044 February 28 at 20:32:09.6 UTC
Last Umbral External Contact	2044 February 28 at 20:43:34.0 UTC
Last Penumbral External Contact	2044 February 28 at 22:38:55.6 UTC

February 28, 2044 Solar Eclipse Parameters
Parameter	Value
Eclipse Magnitude	0.96001
Eclipse Obscuration	0.92161
Gamma	−0.99537
Sun Right Ascension	22h45m44.1s
Sun Declination	-07°51'30.6"
Sun Semi-Diameter	16'08.8"
Sun Equatorial Horizontal Parallax	08.9"
Moon Right Ascension	22h47m30.6s
Moon Declination	-08°41'25.7"
Moon Semi-Diameter	15'29.6"
Moon Equatorial Horizontal Parallax	0°56'51.8"
ΔT	80.8 s

== Eclipse season ==
This eclipse is part of an eclipse season, a period, roughly every six months, when eclipses occur. Only two (or occasionally three) eclipse seasons occur each year, and each season lasts about 35 days and repeats just short of six months (173 days) later; thus two full eclipse seasons always occur each year. Either two or three eclipses happen each eclipse season. In the sequence below, each eclipse is separated by a fortnight.

Eclipse season of February–March 2044
February 28 Ascending node (new moon)	March 13 Descending node (full moon)
Annular solar eclipse Solar Saros 121	Total lunar eclipse Lunar Saros 133

== Related eclipses ==
=== Eclipses in 2044 ===
- An annular solar eclipse on February 28.
- A total lunar eclipse on March 13.
- A total solar eclipse on August 23.
- A total lunar eclipse on September 7.

=== Metonic ===
- Preceded by: Solar eclipse of May 11, 2040
- Followed by: Solar eclipse of December 16, 2047

=== Tzolkinex ===
- Preceded by: Solar eclipse of January 16, 2037
- Followed by: Solar eclipse of April 11, 2051

=== Half-Saros ===
- Preceded by: Lunar eclipse of February 22, 2035
- Followed by: Lunar eclipse of March 4, 2053

=== Tritos ===
- Preceded by: Solar eclipse of March 30, 2033
- Followed by: Solar eclipse of January 27, 2055

=== Solar Saros 121 ===
- Preceded by: Solar eclipse of February 17, 2026
- Followed by: Solar eclipse of March 11, 2062

=== Inex ===
- Preceded by: Solar eclipse of March 20, 2015
- Followed by: Solar eclipse of February 7, 2073

=== Triad ===
- Preceded by: Solar eclipse of April 30, 1957
- Followed by: Solar eclipse of December 30, 2130

=== Solar eclipses of 2044–2047 ===
This eclipse is a member of a semester series. An eclipse in a semester series of solar eclipses repeats approximately every 177 days and 4 hours (a semester) at alternating nodes of the Moon's orbit.

The partial solar eclipses on June 23, 2047 and December 16, 2047 occur in the next lunar year eclipse set.

Solar eclipse series sets from 2044 to 2047
Ascending node			Descending node		
Saros	Map	Gamma	Saros	Map	Gamma
121	February 28, 2044 Annular	−0.9954	126	August 23, 2044 Total	0.9613
131	February 16, 2045 Annular	−0.3125	136	August 12, 2045 Total	0.2116
141	February 5, 2046 Annular	0.3765	146	August 2, 2046 Total	−0.535
151	January 26, 2047 Partial	1.045	156	July 22, 2047 Partial	−1.3477

=== Saros 121 ===
This eclipse is a part of Saros series 121, repeating every 18 years, 11 days, and containing 71 events. The series started with a partial solar eclipse on April 25, 944 AD. It contains total eclipses from July 10, 1070 through October 9, 1809; hybrid eclipses on October 20, 1827 and October 30, 1845; and annular eclipses from November 11, 1863 through February 28, 2044. The series ends at member 71 as a partial eclipse on June 7, 2206. Its eclipses are tabulated in three columns; every third eclipse in the same column is one exeligmos apart, so they all cast shadows over approximately the same parts of the Earth.

The longest duration of totality was produced by member 39 at 6 minutes, 20 seconds on June 21, 1629, and the longest duration of annularity will be produced by member 62 at 2 minutes, 27 seconds on February 28, 2044. All eclipses in this series occur at the Moon’s ascending node of orbit.

Series members 49–70 occur between 1801 and 2200:
49	50	51
October 9, 1809	October 20, 1827	October 30, 1845
52	53	54
November 11, 1863	November 21, 1881	December 3, 1899
55	56	57
December 14, 1917	December 25, 1935	January 5, 1954
58	59	60
January 16, 1972	January 26, 1990	February 7, 2008
61	62	63
February 17, 2026	February 28, 2044	March 11, 2062
64	65	66
March 21, 2080	April 1, 2098	April 13, 2116
67	68	69
April 24, 2134	May 4, 2152	May 16, 2170
70
May 26, 2188

=== Metonic series ===
The metonic series repeats eclipses every 19 years (6939.69 days), lasting about 5 cycles. Eclipses occur in nearly the same calendar date. In addition, the octon subseries repeats 1/5 of that or every 3.8 years (1387.94 days). All eclipses in this table occur at the Moon's ascending node.

21 eclipse events between July 23, 2036 and July 23, 2112
July 23–24	May 11	February 27–28	December 16–17	October 4–5
117	119	121	123	125
July 23, 2036	May 11, 2040	February 28, 2044	December 16, 2047	October 4, 2051
127	129	131	133	135
July 24, 2055	May 11, 2059	February 28, 2063	December 17, 2066	October 4, 2070
137	139	141	143	145
July 24, 2074	May 11, 2078	February 27, 2082	December 16, 2085	October 4, 2089
147	149	151	153	155
July 23, 2093	May 11, 2097	February 28, 2101	December 17, 2104	October 5, 2108
157
July 23, 2112

=== Tritos series ===
This eclipse is a part of a tritos cycle, repeating at alternating nodes every 135 synodic months (≈ 3986.63 days, or 11 years minus 1 month). Their appearance and longitude are irregular due to a lack of synchronization with the anomalistic month (period of perigee), but groupings of 3 tritos cycles (≈ 33 years minus 3 months) come close (≈ 434.044 anomalistic months), so eclipses are similar in these groupings.

The partial solar eclipses on April 8, 1902 (part of Saros 108) and January 5, 1935 (part of Saros 111) are also a part of this series but are not included in the table below.

Series members between 2000 and 2200
July 1, 2000 (Saros 117)	June 1, 2011 (Saros 118)	April 30, 2022 (Saros 119)	March 30, 2033 (Saros 120)	February 28, 2044 (Saros 121)
January 27, 2055 (Saros 122)	December 27, 2065 (Saros 123)	November 26, 2076 (Saros 124)	October 26, 2087 (Saros 125)	September 25, 2098 (Saros 126)
August 26, 2109 (Saros 127)	July 25, 2120 (Saros 128)	June 25, 2131 (Saros 129)	May 25, 2142 (Saros 130)	April 23, 2153 (Saros 131)
March 23, 2164 (Saros 132)	February 21, 2175 (Saros 133)	January 20, 2186 (Saros 134)	December 19, 2196 (Saros 135)	

=== Inex series ===
This eclipse is a part of the long period inex cycle, repeating at alternating nodes, every 358 synodic months (≈ 10,571.95 days, or 29 years minus 20 days). Their appearance and longitude are irregular due to a lack of synchronization with the anomalistic month (period of perigee). However, groupings of 3 inex cycles (≈ 87 years minus 2 months) comes close (≈ 1,151.02 anomalistic months), so eclipses are similar in these groupings.

Series members between 1801 and 2200
August 7, 1812 (Saros 113)	July 18, 1841 (Saros 114)	June 28, 1870 (Saros 115)
June 8, 1899 (Saros 116)	May 19, 1928 (Saros 117)	April 30, 1957 (Saros 118)
April 9, 1986 (Saros 119)	March 20, 2015 (Saros 120)	February 28, 2044 (Saros 121)
February 7, 2073 (Saros 122)	January 19, 2102 (Saros 123)	December 30, 2130 (Saros 124)
December 9, 2159 (Saros 125)	November 18, 2188 (Saros 126)	
