= Solar eclipse of June 12, 2029 =

Future partial solar eclipse

- Partial eclipse
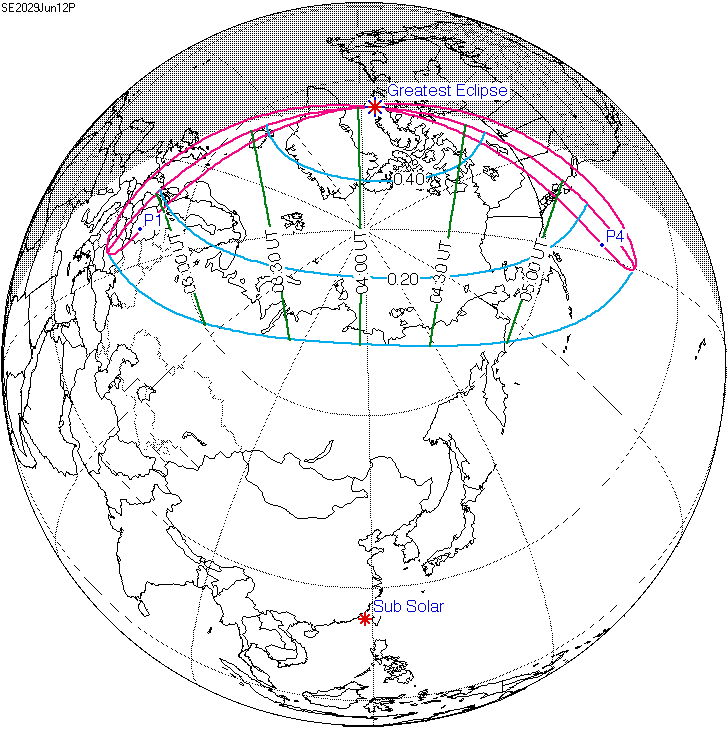
- Map
- Gamma: 1.2943
- Magnitude: 0.4576

Maximum eclipse
- Coordinates: 66.8°N 66.2°W

Times (UTC)
- Greatest eclipse: 4:06:13

References
- Saros: 118 (69 of 72)
- Catalog # (SE5000): 9572

A partial solar eclipse will occur at the Moon's descending node of orbit on Tuesday, June 12, 2029, with a magnitude of 0.4576. A solar eclipse occurs when the Moon passes between Earth and the Sun, thereby totally or partly obscuring the image of the Sun for a viewer on Earth. A partial solar eclipse occurs in the polar regions of the Earth when the center of the Moon's shadow misses the Earth.

This will be the second of four partial solar eclipses in 2029, with the others occurring on January 14, July 11, and December 5.

A partial eclipse will be visible for parts of Northern and Central Europe, northern Russia, Greenland, Alaska, and northwestern Canada.

== Images ==
Animated path

== Eclipse timing ==
=== Places experiencing partial eclipse ===
Solar Eclipse of June 12, 2029 (Local Times)
Country or territory	City or place	Start of partial eclipse	Maximum eclipse	End of partial eclipse	Duration of eclipse (hr:min)	Maximum coverage
Ukraine	Kyiv	05:30:15	05:45:47	06:01:35	0:31	0.85%
Hungary	Budapest	04:46:17 (sunrise)	04:50:09	05:09:05	0:23	2.39%
Russia	Moscow	05:31:56	05:51:59	06:12:28	0:41	1.60%
Belarus	Minsk	05:27:20	05:52:19	06:17:56	0:51	3.70%
Poland	Warsaw	04:26:30	04:53:02	05:20:18	0:54	4.96%
Lithuania	Vilnius	05:27:07	05:54:28	06:22:37	0:56	5.04%
Slovakia	Bratislava	04:51:05 (sunrise)	04:55:03	05:13:42	0:23	3.26%
Czech Republic	Prague	04:52:33 (sunrise)	04:56:47	05:22:02	0:29	5.80%
Austria	Vienna	04:53:47 (sunrise)	04:57:45	05:14:49	0:21	3.28%
Germany	Berlin	04:43:31 (sunrise)	04:57:52	05:28:55	0:45	8.13%
Latvia	Riga	05:27:57	05:58:28	06:29:55	1:02	7.05%
Estonia	Tallinn	05:29:28	06:02:11	06:35:55	1:06	8.50%
Denmark	Copenhagen	04:29:05	05:02:24	05:36:43	1:11	10.82%
Finland	Helsinki	05:29:59	06:03:19	06:37:39	1:08	8.91%
Sweden	Stockholm	04:30:02	05:04:45	05:40:32	1:11	11.11%
Åland Islands	Mariehamn	05:30:19	06:05:08	06:40:59	1:11	10.86%
Norway	Oslo	04:32:17	05:09:09	05:47:06	1:15	14.47%
Faroe Islands	Tórshavn	03:41:14	04:21:46	05:03:16	1:24	22.29%
Netherlands	Amsterdam	05:18:17 (sunrise)	05:22:52	05:36:54	0:19	5.77%
Belgium	Brussels	05:28:54 (sunrise)	05:31:43	05:34:25	0:06	0.58%
United Kingdom	Edinburgh	04:27:06 (sunrise)	04:32:31	04:50:42	0:24	10.11%
Iceland	Reykjavík	03:00:38 (sunrise)	03:33:34	04:16:52	1:16	27.79%
Svalbard and Jan Mayen	Longyearbyen	04:53:13	05:37:50	06:23:14	1:30	20.06%
Greenland	Kangerlussuaq	02:09:52	02:54:30	03:39:20	1:29	33.41%
Greenland	Pituffik	00:17:40	01:04:48	01:51:47	1:34	31.44%
Canada	Pond Inlet	23:24:00 (Note: The time listed here for this location occurs on June 11, 2029, local time.)	00:10:33	00:56:47	1:33	32.79%
Canada	Baker Lake (Note: The times listed for this location occur on June 11, 2029, local time.)	22:42:19	23:26:40	23:55:12 (sunset)	1:13	31.12%
Canada	Inuvik	21:57:20	22:41:39	23:24:46	1:27	21.68%
United States	Juneau	20:17:45	20:57:14	21:35:28	1:18	16.78%
United States	Anchorage	20:21:00	20:59:14	21:36:10	1:15	12.17%

== Eclipse details ==
Shown below are two tables displaying details about this particular solar eclipse. The first table outlines times at which the Moon's penumbra or umbra attains the specific parameter, and the second table describes various other parameters pertaining to this eclipse.

June 12, 2029 Solar Eclipse Times
Event	Time (UTC)
First Penumbral External Contact	2029 June 12 at 02:27:40.7 UTC
Ecliptic Conjunction	2029 June 12 at 03:51:42.6 UTC
Equatorial Conjunction	2029 June 12 at 04:01:14.1 UTC
Greatest Eclipse	2029 June 12 at 04:06:13.0 UTC
Last Penumbral External Contact	2029 June 12 at 05:44:42.8 UTC

June 12, 2029 Solar Eclipse Parameters
Parameter	Value
Eclipse Magnitude	0.45761
Eclipse Obscuration	0.34111
Gamma	1.29431
Sun Right Ascension	05h22m58.2s
Sun Declination	+23°09'45.7"
Sun Semi-Diameter	15'45.0"
Sun Equatorial Horizontal Parallax	08.7"
Moon Right Ascension	05h23m08.9s
Moon Declination	+24°21'37.7"
Moon Semi-Diameter	15'10.6"
Moon Equatorial Horizontal Parallax	0°55'42.0"
ΔT	73.6 s

== Eclipse season ==
This eclipse is part of an eclipse season, a period, roughly every six months, when eclipses occur. Only two (or occasionally three) eclipse seasons occur each year, and each season lasts about 35 days and repeats just short of six months (173 days) later; thus two full eclipse seasons always occur each year. Either two or three eclipses happen each eclipse season. In the sequence below, each eclipse is separated by a fortnight. The first and last eclipse in this sequence is separated by one synodic month.

Eclipse season of June–July 2029
June 12 Descending node (new moon)	June 26 Ascending node (full moon)	July 11 Descending node (new moon)
Partial solar eclipse Solar Saros 118	Total lunar eclipse Lunar Saros 130	Partial solar eclipse Solar Saros 156

== Related eclipses ==
=== Eclipses in 2029 ===
- A partial solar eclipse on January 14.
- A partial solar eclipse on June 12.
- A total lunar eclipse on June 26.
- A partial solar eclipse on July 11.
- A partial solar eclipse on December 5.
- A total lunar eclipse on December 20.

=== Metonic ===
- Followed by: Solar eclipse of March 30, 2033

=== Tzolkinex ===
- Preceded by: Solar eclipse of April 30, 2022
- Followed by: Solar eclipse of July 23, 2036

=== Half-Saros ===
- Preceded by: Lunar eclipse of June 5, 2020
- Followed by: Lunar eclipse of June 17, 2038

=== Tritos ===
- Preceded by: Solar eclipse of July 13, 2018
- Followed by: Solar eclipse of May 11, 2040

=== Solar Saros 118 ===
- Preceded by: Solar eclipse of June 1, 2011
- Followed by: Solar eclipse of June 23, 2047

=== Inex ===
- Preceded by: Solar eclipse of July 1, 2000
- Followed by: Solar eclipse of May 22, 2058

=== Triad ===
- Preceded by: Solar eclipse of August 12, 1942
- Followed by: Solar eclipse of April 13, 2116

=== Solar eclipses of 2029–2032 ===
This eclipse is a member of a semester series. An eclipse in a semester series of solar eclipses repeats approximately every 177 days and 4 hours (a semester) at alternating nodes of the Moon's orbit.

The partial solar eclipses on January 14, 2029 and July 11, 2029 occur in the previous lunar year eclipse set.

Solar eclipse series sets from 2029 to 2032
Descending node			Ascending node		
Saros	Map	Gamma	Saros	Map	Gamma
118	June 12, 2029 Partial	1.29431	123	December 5, 2029 Partial	−1.06090
128	June 1, 2030 Annular	0.56265	133	November 25, 2030 Total	−0.38669
138	May 21, 2031 Annular	−0.19699	143	November 14, 2031 Hybrid	0.30776
148	May 9, 2032 Annular	−0.93748	153	November 3, 2032 Partial	1.06431

=== Saros 118 ===
This eclipse is a part of Saros series 118, repeating every 18 years, 11 days, and containing 72 events. The series started with a partial solar eclipse on May 24, 803 AD. It contains total eclipses from August 19, 947 AD through October 25, 1650; hybrid eclipses on November 4, 1668 and November 15, 1686; and annular eclipses from November 27, 1704 through April 30, 1957. The series ends at member 72 as a partial eclipse on July 15, 2083. Its eclipses are tabulated in three columns; every third eclipse in the same column is one exeligmos apart, so they all cast shadows over approximately the same parts of the Earth.

The longest duration of totality was produced by member 34 at 6 minutes, 59 seconds on May 16, 1398, and the longest duration of annularity was produced by member 59 at 1 minutes, 58 seconds on February 23, 1849. All eclipses in this series occur at the Moon’s descending node of orbit.

Series members 57–72 occur between 1801 and 2083:
57	58	59
February 1, 1813	February 12, 1831	February 23, 1849
60	61	62
March 6, 1867	March 16, 1885	March 29, 1903
63	64	65
April 8, 1921	April 19, 1939	April 30, 1957
66	67	68
May 11, 1975	May 21, 1993	June 1, 2011
69	70	71
June 12, 2029	June 23, 2047	July 3, 2065
72
July 15, 2083

=== Metonic series ===
The metonic series repeats eclipses every 19 years (6939.69 days), lasting about 5 cycles. Eclipses occur in nearly the same calendar date. In addition, the octon subseries repeats 1/5 of that or every 3.8 years (1387.94 days). All eclipses in this table occur at the Moon's descending node.

22 eclipse events between June 12, 2029 and November 4, 2116
June 11–12	March 30–31	January 16	November 4–5	August 23–24
118	120	122	124	126
June 12, 2029	March 30, 2033	January 16, 2037	November 4, 2040	August 23, 2044
128	130	132	134	136
June 11, 2048	March 30, 2052	January 16, 2056	November 5, 2059	August 24, 2063
138	140	142	144	146
June 11, 2067	March 31, 2071	January 16, 2075	November 4, 2078	August 24, 2082
148	150	152	154	156
June 11, 2086	March 31, 2090	January 16, 2094	November 4, 2097	August 24, 2101
158	160	162	164	
June 12, 2105			November 4, 2116	

=== Tritos series ===
This eclipse is a part of a tritos cycle, repeating at alternating nodes every 135 synodic months (≈ 3986.63 days, or 11 years minus 1 month). Their appearance and longitude are irregular due to a lack of synchronization with the anomalistic month (period of perigee), but groupings of 3 tritos cycles (≈ 33 years minus 3 months) come close (≈ 434.044 anomalistic months), so eclipses are similar in these groupings.

Series members between 2018 and 2200
July 13, 2018 (Saros 117)	June 12, 2029 (Saros 118)	May 11, 2040 (Saros 119)	April 11, 2051 (Saros 120)	March 11, 2062 (Saros 121)
February 7, 2073 (Saros 122)	January 7, 2084 (Saros 123)	December 7, 2094 (Saros 124)	November 6, 2105 (Saros 125)	October 6, 2116 (Saros 126)
September 6, 2127 (Saros 127)	August 5, 2138 (Saros 128)	July 5, 2149 (Saros 129)	June 4, 2160 (Saros 130)	May 5, 2171 (Saros 131)
April 3, 2182 (Saros 132)	March 3, 2193 (Saros 133)			

=== Inex series ===
This eclipse is a part of the long period inex cycle, repeating at alternating nodes, every 358 synodic months (≈ 10,571.95 days, or 29 years minus 20 days). Their appearance and longitude are irregular due to a lack of synchronization with the anomalistic month (period of perigee). However, groupings of 3 inex cycles (≈ 87 years minus 2 months) comes close (≈ 1,151.02 anomalistic months), so eclipses are similar in these groupings.

Series members between 1801 and 2200
October 31, 1826 (Saros 111)		
August 31, 1913 (Saros 114)	August 12, 1942 (Saros 115)	July 22, 1971 (Saros 116)
July 1, 2000 (Saros 117)	June 12, 2029 (Saros 118)	May 22, 2058 (Saros 119)
May 2, 2087 (Saros 120)	April 13, 2116 (Saros 121)	March 23, 2145 (Saros 122)
March 3, 2174 (Saros 123)		
