= Solar eclipse of July 22, 1971 =

20th-century partial solar eclipse

- Partial eclipse
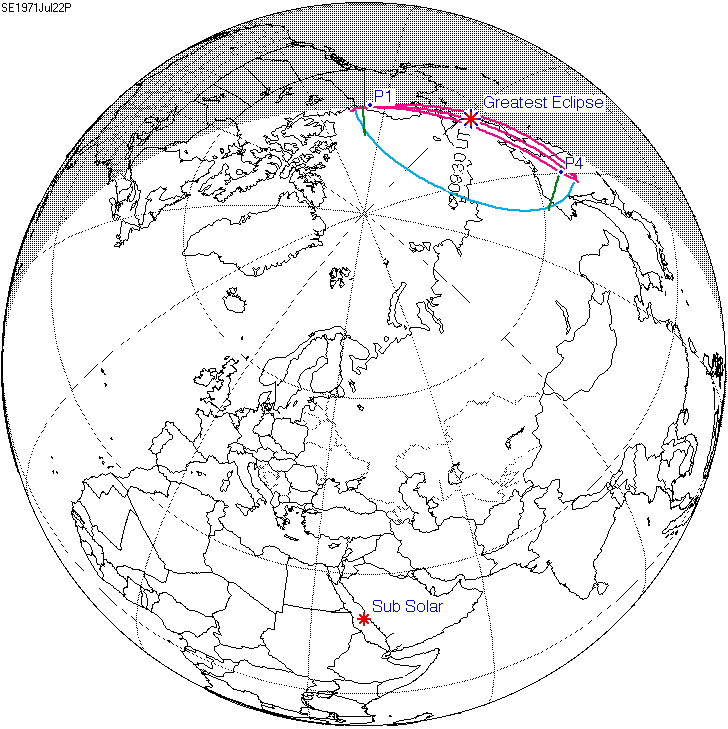
- Map
- Gamma: 1.513
- Magnitude: 0.0689

Maximum eclipse
- Coordinates: 63.5°N 177°E

Times (UTC)
- Greatest eclipse: 9:31:55

References
- Saros: 116 (70 of 70)
- Catalog # (SE5000): 9446

A partial solar eclipse occurred at the Moon's descending node of orbit on Thursday, July 22, 1971, with a magnitude of 0.0689. A solar eclipse occurs when the Moon passes between Earth and the Sun, thereby totally or partly obscuring the image of the Sun for a viewer on Earth. A partial solar eclipse occurs in the polar regions of the Earth when the center of the Moon's shadow misses the Earth.

A partial eclipse was visible for parts of the eastern Soviet Union and northern Alaska. This was the 70th and final solar eclipse from Solar Saros 116.

== Eclipse details ==
Shown below are two tables displaying details about this particular solar eclipse. The first table outlines times at which the Moon's penumbra or umbra attains the specific parameter, and the second table describes various other parameters pertaining to this eclipse.

July 22, 1971 Solar Eclipse Times
Event	Time (UTC)
Equatorial Conjunction	1971 July 22 at 08:38:38.2 UTC
First Penumbral External Contact	1971 July 22 at 08:52:56.7 UTC
Ecliptic Conjunction	1971 July 22 at 09:15:39.4 UTC
Greatest Eclipse	1971 July 22 at 09:31:55.3 UTC
Last Penumbral External Contact	1971 July 22 at 10:11:20.6 UTC

July 22, 1971 Solar Eclipse Parameters
Parameter	Value
Eclipse Magnitude	0.06899
Eclipse Obscuration	0.02136
Gamma	1.51298
Sun Right Ascension	08h04m17.6s
Sun Declination	+20°22'36.4"
Sun Semi-Diameter	15'44.4"
Sun Equatorial Horizontal Parallax	08.7"
Moon Right Ascension	08h06m05.8s
Moon Declination	+21°43'24.7"
Moon Semi-Diameter	15'17.0"
Moon Equatorial Horizontal Parallax	0°56'05.5"
ΔT	41.8 s

== Eclipse season ==
This eclipse is part of an eclipse season, a period, roughly every six months, when eclipses occur. Only two (or occasionally three) eclipse seasons occur each year, and each season lasts about 35 days and repeats just short of six months (173 days) later; thus two full eclipse seasons always occur each year. Either two or three eclipses happen each eclipse season. In the sequence below, each eclipse is separated by a fortnight. The first and last eclipse in this sequence is separated by one synodic month.

Eclipse season of July–August 1971
July 22 Descending node (new moon)	August 6 Ascending node (full moon)	August 20 Descending node (new moon)
Partial solar eclipse Solar Saros 116	Total lunar eclipse Lunar Saros 128	Partial solar eclipse Solar Saros 154

== Related eclipses ==
=== Eclipses in 1971 ===
- A total lunar eclipse on February 10.
- A partial solar eclipse on February 25.
- A partial solar eclipse on July 22.
- A total lunar eclipse on August 6.
- A partial solar eclipse on August 20.

=== Metonic ===
- Followed by: Solar eclipse of May 11, 1975

=== Tzolkinex ===
- Preceded by: Solar eclipse of June 10, 1964

=== Half-Saros ===
- Preceded by: Lunar eclipse of July 17, 1962
- Followed by: Lunar eclipse of July 27, 1980

=== Tritos ===
- Followed by: Solar eclipse of June 21, 1982

=== Solar Saros 116 ===
- Preceded by: Solar eclipse of July 11, 1953

=== Inex ===
- Preceded by: Solar eclipse of August 12, 1942
- Followed by: Solar eclipse of July 1, 2000

=== Triad ===
- Followed by: Solar eclipse of May 22, 2058

=== Solar eclipses of 1971–1974 ===
This eclipse is a member of a semester series. An eclipse in a semester series of solar eclipses repeats approximately every 177 days and 4 hours (a semester) at alternating nodes of the Moon's orbit.

The partial solar eclipses on February 25, 1971 and August 20, 1971 occur in the previous lunar year eclipse set.

Solar eclipse series sets from 1971 to 1974
Descending node			Ascending node		
Saros	Map	Gamma	Saros	Map	Gamma
116	July 22, 1971 Partial	1.513	121	January 16, 1972 Annular	−0.9365
126	July 10, 1972 Total	0.6872	131	January 4, 1973 Annular	−0.2644
136	June 30, 1973 Total	−0.0785	141	December 24, 1973 Annular	0.4171
146	June 20, 1974 Total	−0.8239	151	December 13, 1974 Partial	1.0797

=== Saros 116 ===
This eclipse is a part of Saros series 116, repeating every 18 years, 11 days, and containing 70 events. The series started with a partial solar eclipse on June 23, 727 AD. It contains annular eclipses from October 10, 907 AD through May 6, 1845. There are no hybrid or total eclipses in this set. The series ends at member 70 as a partial eclipse on July 22, 1971. Its eclipses are tabulated in three columns; every third eclipse in the same column is one exeligmos apart, so they all cast shadows over approximately the same parts of the Earth.

The longest duration of annularity was produced by member 51 at 12 minutes, 2 seconds on December 25, 1628. All eclipses in this series occur at the Moon’s descending node of orbit.

Series members 61–70 occur between 1801 and 1971:
61	62	63
April 14, 1809	April 26, 1827	May 6, 1845
64	65	66
May 17, 1863	May 27, 1881	June 8, 1899
67	68	69
June 19, 1917	June 30, 1935	July 11, 1953
70
July 22, 1971

=== Metonic series ===
The metonic series repeats eclipses every 19 years (6939.69 days), lasting about 5 cycles. Eclipses occur in nearly the same calendar date. In addition, the octon subseries repeats 1/5 of that or every 3.8 years (1387.94 days). All eclipses in this table occur at the Moon's descending node.

21 eclipse events between July 22, 1971 and July 22, 2047
July 22	May 9–11	February 26–27	December 14–15	October 2–3
116	118	120	122	124
July 22, 1971	May 11, 1975	February 26, 1979	December 15, 1982	October 3, 1986
126	128	130	132	134
July 22, 1990	May 10, 1994	February 26, 1998	December 14, 2001	October 3, 2005
136	138	140	142	144
July 22, 2009	May 10, 2013	February 26, 2017	December 14, 2020	October 2, 2024
146	148	150	152	154
July 22, 2028	May 9, 2032	February 27, 2036	December 15, 2039	October 3, 2043
156
July 22, 2047

=== Tritos series ===
This eclipse is a part of a tritos cycle, repeating at alternating nodes every 135 synodic months (≈ 3986.63 days, or 11 years minus 1 month). Their appearance and longitude are irregular due to a lack of synchronization with the anomalistic month (period of perigee), but groupings of 3 tritos cycles (≈ 33 years minus 3 months) come close (≈ 434.044 anomalistic months), so eclipses are similar in these groupings.

The partial solar eclipses on March 27, 1884 (part of Saros 108) and December 24, 1916 (part of Saros 111) are also a part of this series but are not included in the table below.

Series members between 1971 and 2200
July 22, 1971 (Saros 116)	June 21, 1982 (Saros 117)	May 21, 1993 (Saros 118)	April 19, 2004 (Saros 119)	March 20, 2015 (Saros 120)
February 17, 2026 (Saros 121)	January 16, 2037 (Saros 122)	December 16, 2047 (Saros 123)	November 16, 2058 (Saros 124)	October 15, 2069 (Saros 125)
September 13, 2080 (Saros 126)	August 15, 2091 (Saros 127)	July 15, 2102 (Saros 128)	June 13, 2113 (Saros 129)	May 14, 2124 (Saros 130)
April 13, 2135 (Saros 131)	March 12, 2146 (Saros 132)	February 9, 2157 (Saros 133)	January 10, 2168 (Saros 134)	December 9, 2178 (Saros 135)
November 8, 2189 (Saros 136)	October 9, 2200 (Saros 137)			

=== Inex series ===
This eclipse is a part of the long period inex cycle, repeating at alternating nodes, every 358 synodic months (≈ 10,571.95 days, or 29 years minus 20 days). Their appearance and longitude are irregular due to a lack of synchronization with the anomalistic month (period of perigee). However, groupings of 3 inex cycles (≈ 87 years minus 2 months) comes close (≈ 1,151.02 anomalistic months), so eclipses are similar in these groupings.

Series members between 1801 and 2200
October 31, 1826 (Saros 111)		
August 31, 1913 (Saros 114)	August 12, 1942 (Saros 115)	July 22, 1971 (Saros 116)
July 1, 2000 (Saros 117)	June 12, 2029 (Saros 118)	May 22, 2058 (Saros 119)
May 2, 2087 (Saros 120)	April 13, 2116 (Saros 121)	March 23, 2145 (Saros 122)
March 3, 2174 (Saros 123)		
