= Solar eclipse of June 19, 1917 =

20th-century partial solar eclipse

- Partial eclipse
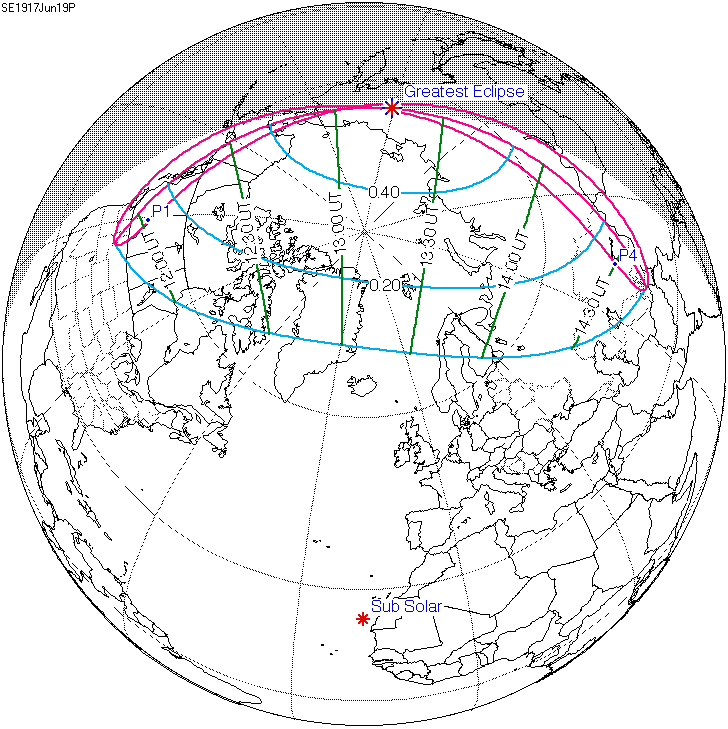
- Map
- Gamma: 1.2857
- Magnitude: 0.4729

Maximum eclipse
- Coordinates: 66.2°N 150.1°E

Times (UTC)
- Greatest eclipse: 13:16:21

References
- Saros: 116 (67 of 70)
- Catalog # (SE5000): 9322

A partial solar eclipse occurred at the Moon's descending node of orbit on Tuesday, June 19, 1917, with a magnitude of 0.4729. A solar eclipse occurs when the Moon passes between Earth and the Sun, thereby totally or partly obscuring the image of the Sun for a viewer on Earth. A partial solar eclipse occurs in the polar regions of the Earth when the center of the Moon's shadow misses the Earth.

This was the second of four solar eclipses in 1917, with the others occurring on January 23, July 19, and December 14.

A partial eclipse was visible for parts of northern North America, Northern Europe, and North Asia.

== Eclipse details ==
Shown below are two tables displaying details about this particular solar eclipse. The first table outlines times at which the Moon's penumbra or umbra attains the specific parameter, and the second table describes various other parameters pertaining to this eclipse.

June 19, 1917 Solar Eclipse Times
Event	Time (UTC)
First Penumbral External Contact	1917 June 19 at 11:36:05.9 UTC
Ecliptic Conjunction	1917 June 19 at 13:02:07.8 UTC
Equatorial Conjunction	1917 June 19 at 13:04:46.6 UTC
Greatest Eclipse	1917 June 19 at 13:16:20.5 UTC
Last Penumbral External Contact	1917 June 19 at 14:56:44.7 UTC

June 19, 1917 Solar Eclipse Parameters
Parameter	Value
Eclipse Magnitude	0.47297
Eclipse Obscuration	0.35726
Gamma	1.28565
Sun Right Ascension	05h49m46.5s
Sun Declination	+23°25'46.5"
Sun Semi-Diameter	15'44.3"
Sun Equatorial Horizontal Parallax	08.7"
Moon Right Ascension	05h50m11.1s
Moon Declination	+24°36'49.5"
Moon Semi-Diameter	15'08.6"
Moon Equatorial Horizontal Parallax	0°55'34.6"
ΔT	19.6 s

== Eclipse season ==
This eclipse is part of an eclipse season, a period, roughly every six months, when eclipses occur. Only two (or occasionally three) eclipse seasons occur each year, and each season lasts about 35 days and repeats just short of six months (173 days) later; thus two full eclipse seasons always occur each year. Either two or three eclipses happen each eclipse season. In the sequence below, each eclipse is separated by a fortnight. The first and last eclipse in this sequence is separated by one synodic month.

Eclipse season of June–July 1917
June 19 Descending node (new moon)	July 4 Ascending node (full moon)	July 19 Descending node (new moon)
Partial solar eclipse Solar Saros 116	Total lunar eclipse Lunar Saros 128	Partial solar eclipse Solar Saros 154

== Related eclipses ==
=== Eclipses in 1917 ===
- A total lunar eclipse on January 8.
- A partial solar eclipse on January 23.
- A partial solar eclipse on June 19.
- A total lunar eclipse on July 4.
- A partial solar eclipse on July 19.
- An annular solar eclipse on December 14.
- A total lunar eclipse on December 28.

=== Metonic ===
- Preceded by: Solar eclipse of August 31, 1913
- Followed by: Solar eclipse of April 8, 1921

=== Tzolkinex ===
- Preceded by: Solar eclipse of May 9, 1910
- Followed by: Solar eclipse of July 31, 1924

=== Half-Saros ===
- Preceded by: Lunar eclipse of June 14, 1908
- Followed by: Lunar eclipse of June 25, 1926

=== Tritos ===
- Preceded by: Solar eclipse of July 21, 1906
- Followed by: Solar eclipse of May 19, 1928

=== Solar Saros 116 ===
- Preceded by: Solar eclipse of June 8, 1899
- Followed by: Solar eclipse of June 30, 1935

=== Inex ===
- Preceded by: Solar eclipse of July 9, 1888
- Followed by: Solar eclipse of May 30, 1946

=== Triad ===
- Preceded by: Solar eclipse of August 18, 1830
- Followed by: Solar eclipse of April 19, 2004

=== Solar eclipses of 1916–1920 ===
This eclipse is a member of a semester series. An eclipse in a semester series of solar eclipses repeats approximately every 177 days and 4 hours (a semester) at alternating nodes of the Moon's orbit.

The solar eclipses on February 3, 1916 (total), July 30, 1916 (annular), January 23, 1917 (partial), and July 19, 1917 (partial) occur in the previous lunar year eclipse set.

Solar eclipse series sets from 1916 to 1920
Ascending node			Descending node		
Saros	Map	Gamma	Saros	Map	Gamma
111	December 24, 1916 Partial	−1.5321	116	June 19, 1917 Partial	1.2857
121	December 14, 1917 Annular	−0.9157	126	June 8, 1918 Total	0.4658
131	December 3, 1918 Annular	−0.2387	136 Totality in Príncipe	May 29, 1919 Total	−0.2955
141	November 22, 1919 Annular	0.4549	146	May 18, 1920 Partial	−1.0239
151	November 10, 1920 Partial	1.1287			

=== Saros 116 ===
This eclipse is a part of Saros series 116, repeating every 18 years, 11 days, and containing 70 events. The series started with a partial solar eclipse on June 23, 727 AD. It contains annular eclipses from October 10, 907 AD through May 6, 1845. There are no hybrid or total eclipses in this set. The series ends at member 70 as a partial eclipse on July 22, 1971. Its eclipses are tabulated in three columns; every third eclipse in the same column is one exeligmos apart, so they all cast shadows over approximately the same parts of the Earth.

The longest duration of annularity was produced by member 51 at 12 minutes, 2 seconds on December 25, 1628. All eclipses in this series occur at the Moon’s descending node of orbit.

Series members 61–70 occur between 1801 and 1971:
61	62	63
April 14, 1809	April 26, 1827	May 6, 1845
64	65	66
May 17, 1863	May 27, 1881	June 8, 1899
67	68	69
June 19, 1917	June 30, 1935	July 11, 1953
70
July 22, 1971

=== Metonic series ===
The metonic series repeats eclipses every 19 years (6939.69 days), lasting about 5 cycles. Eclipses occur in nearly the same calendar date. In addition, the octon subseries repeats 1/5 of that or every 3.8 years (1387.94 days). All eclipses in this table occur at the Moon's descending node.

22 eclipse events between April 8, 1902 and August 31, 1989
April 7–8	January 24–25	November 12	August 31–September 1	June 19–20
108	110	112	114	116
April 8, 1902			August 31, 1913	June 19, 1917
118	120	122	124	126
April 8, 1921	January 24, 1925	November 12, 1928	August 31, 1932	June 19, 1936
128	130	132	134	136
April 7, 1940	January 25, 1944	November 12, 1947	September 1, 1951	June 20, 1955
138	140	142	144	146
April 8, 1959	January 25, 1963	November 12, 1966	August 31, 1970	June 20, 1974
148	150	152	154	
April 7, 1978	January 25, 1982	November 12, 1985	August 31, 1989	

=== Tritos series ===
This eclipse is a part of a tritos cycle, repeating at alternating nodes every 135 synodic months (≈ 3986.63 days, or 11 years minus 1 month). Their appearance and longitude are irregular due to a lack of synchronization with the anomalistic month (period of perigee), but groupings of 3 tritos cycles (≈ 33 years minus 3 months) come close (≈ 434.044 anomalistic months), so eclipses are similar in these groupings.

Series members between 1801 and 2200
March 25, 1819 (Saros 107)	February 23, 1830 (Saros 108)	January 22, 1841 (Saros 109)		November 21, 1862 (Saros 111)
		August 20, 1895 (Saros 114)	July 21, 1906 (Saros 115)	June 19, 1917 (Saros 116)
May 19, 1928 (Saros 117)	April 19, 1939 (Saros 118)	March 18, 1950 (Saros 119)	February 15, 1961 (Saros 120)	January 16, 1972 (Saros 121)
December 15, 1982 (Saros 122)	November 13, 1993 (Saros 123)	October 14, 2004 (Saros 124)	September 13, 2015 (Saros 125)	August 12, 2026 (Saros 126)
July 13, 2037 (Saros 127)	June 11, 2048 (Saros 128)	May 11, 2059 (Saros 129)	April 11, 2070 (Saros 130)	March 10, 2081 (Saros 131)
February 7, 2092 (Saros 132)	January 8, 2103 (Saros 133)	December 8, 2113 (Saros 134)	November 6, 2124 (Saros 135)	October 7, 2135 (Saros 136)
September 6, 2146 (Saros 137)	August 5, 2157 (Saros 138)	July 5, 2168 (Saros 139)	June 5, 2179 (Saros 140)	May 4, 2190 (Saros 141)

=== Inex series ===
This eclipse is a part of the long period inex cycle, repeating at alternating nodes, every 358 synodic months (≈ 10,571.95 days, or 29 years minus 20 days). Their appearance and longitude are irregular due to a lack of synchronization with the anomalistic month (period of perigee). However, groupings of 3 inex cycles (≈ 87 years minus 2 months) comes close (≈ 1,151.02 anomalistic months), so eclipses are similar in these groupings.

Series members between 1801 and 2200
September 8, 1801 (Saros 112)	August 18, 1830 (Saros 113)	July 29, 1859 (Saros 114)
July 9, 1888 (Saros 115)	June 19, 1917 (Saros 116)	May 30, 1946 (Saros 117)
May 11, 1975 (Saros 118)	April 19, 2004 (Saros 119)	March 30, 2033 (Saros 120)
March 11, 2062 (Saros 121)	February 18, 2091 (Saros 122)	January 30, 2120 (Saros 123)
January 9, 2149 (Saros 124)	December 20, 2177 (Saros 125)	
