= Solar eclipse of June 21, 1982 =

20th-century partial solar eclipse

- Partial eclipse
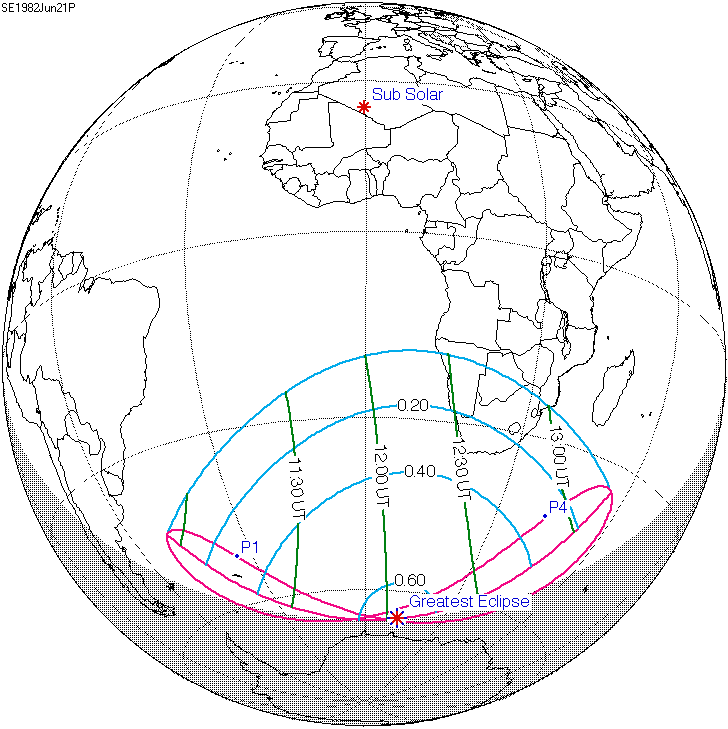
- Map
- Gamma: −1.2102
- Magnitude: 0.6168

Maximum eclipse
- Coordinates: 65.9°S 13.2°E

Times (UTC)
- Greatest eclipse: 12:04:33

References
- Saros: 117 (67 of 71)
- Catalog # (SE5000): 9470

A partial solar eclipse occurred at the Moon's ascending node of orbit on Monday, June 21, 1982, with a magnitude of 0.6168. A solar eclipse occurs when the Moon passes between Earth and the Sun, thereby totally or partly obscuring the image of the Sun for a viewer on Earth. A partial solar eclipse occurs in the polar regions of the Earth when the center of the Moon's shadow misses the Earth.

This was the second of four partial solar eclipses in 1982, with the others occurring on January 25, July 20, and December 15.

A partial eclipse was visible for parts of Southern Africa.

== Eclipse details ==
Shown below are two tables displaying details about this particular solar eclipse. The first table outlines times at which the Moon's penumbra or umbra attains the specific parameter, and the second table describes various other parameters pertaining to this eclipse.

June 21, 1982 Solar Eclipse Times
Event	Time (UTC)
First Penumbral External Contact	1982 June 21 at 10:28:43.0 UTC
Equatorial Conjunction	1982 June 21 at 11:52:25.6 UTC
Ecliptic Conjunction	1982 June 21 at 11:52:38.0 UTC
Greatest Eclipse	1982 June 21 at 12:04:32.7 UTC
Last Penumbral External Contact	1982 June 21 at 13:40:27.7 UTC

June 21, 1982 Solar Eclipse Parameters
Parameter	Value
Eclipse Magnitude	0.61683
Eclipse Obscuration	0.53357
Gamma	−1.21017
Sun Right Ascension	05h59m04.6s
Sun Declination	+23°26'26.0"
Sun Semi-Diameter	15'44.2"
Sun Equatorial Horizontal Parallax	08.7"
Moon Right Ascension	05h59m35.7s
Moon Declination	+22°12'41.3"
Moon Semi-Diameter	16'43.2"
Moon Equatorial Horizontal Parallax	1°01'21.9"
ΔT	52.5 s

== Eclipse season ==
This eclipse is part of an eclipse season, a period, roughly every six months, when eclipses occur. Only two (or occasionally three) eclipse seasons occur each year, and each season lasts about 35 days and repeats just short of six months (173 days) later; thus two full eclipse seasons always occur each year. Either two or three eclipses happen each eclipse season. In the sequence below, each eclipse is separated by a fortnight. The first and last eclipse in this sequence is separated by one synodic month.

Eclipse season of June–July 1982
June 21 Ascending node (new moon)	July 6 Descending node (full moon)	July 20 Ascending node (new moon)
Partial solar eclipse Solar Saros 117	Total lunar eclipse Lunar Saros 129	Partial solar eclipse Solar Saros 155

== Related eclipses ==
=== Eclipses in 1982 ===
- A total lunar eclipse on January 9.
- A partial solar eclipse on January 25.
- A partial solar eclipse on June 21.
- A total lunar eclipse on July 6.
- A partial solar eclipse on July 20.
- A partial solar eclipse on December 15.
- A total lunar eclipse on December 30.

=== Metonic ===
- Followed by: Solar eclipse of April 9, 1986

=== Tzolkinex ===
- Preceded by: Solar eclipse of May 11, 1975

=== Half-Saros ===
- Preceded by: Lunar eclipse of June 15, 1973
- Followed by: Lunar eclipse of June 27, 1991

=== Tritos ===
- Preceded by: Solar eclipse of July 22, 1971
- Followed by: Solar eclipse of May 21, 1993

=== Solar Saros 117 ===
- Preceded by: Solar eclipse of June 10, 1964
- Followed by: Solar eclipse of July 1, 2000

=== Inex ===
- Preceded by: Solar eclipse of July 11, 1953
- Followed by: Solar eclipse of June 1, 2011

=== Triad ===
- Preceded by: Solar eclipse of August 20, 1895
- Followed by: Solar eclipse of April 21, 2069

=== Solar eclipses of 1982–1985 ===
This eclipse is a member of a semester series. An eclipse in a semester series of solar eclipses repeats approximately every 177 days and 4 hours (a semester) at alternating nodes of the Moon's orbit.

The partial solar eclipses on January 25, 1982 and July 20, 1982 occur in the previous lunar year eclipse set.

Solar eclipse series sets from 1982 to 1985
Ascending node			Descending node		
Saros	Map	Gamma	Saros	Map	Gamma
117	June 21, 1982 Partial	−1.2102	122	December 15, 1982 Partial	1.1293
127	June 11, 1983 Total	−0.4947	132	December 4, 1983 Annular	0.4015
137	May 30, 1984 Annular	0.2755	142 Partial in Gisborne, New Zealand	November 22, 1984 Total	−0.3132
147	May 19, 1985 Partial	1.072	152	November 12, 1985 Total	−0.9795

=== Saros 117 ===
This eclipse is a part of Saros series 117, repeating every 18 years, 11 days, and containing 71 events. The series started with a partial solar eclipse on June 24, 792 AD. It contains annular eclipses from September 18, 936 AD through May 14, 1333; hybrid eclipses from May 25, 1351 through July 8, 1423; and total eclipses from July 18, 1441 through May 19, 1928. The series ends at member 71 as a partial eclipse on August 3, 2054. Its eclipses are tabulated in three columns; every third eclipse in the same column is one exeligmos apart, so they all cast shadows over approximately the same parts of the Earth.

The longest duration of annularity was produced by member 16 at 9 minutes, 26 seconds on December 3, 1062, and the longest duration of totality was produced by member 62 at 4 minutes, 19 seconds on April 26, 1892. All eclipses in this series occur at the Moon’s ascending node of orbit.

Series members 57–71 occur between 1801 and 2054:
57	58	59
March 4, 1802	March 14, 1820	March 25, 1838
60	61	62
April 5, 1856	April 16, 1874	April 26, 1892
63	64	65
May 9, 1910	May 19, 1928	May 30, 1946
66	67	68
June 10, 1964	June 21, 1982	July 1, 2000
69	70	71
July 13, 2018	July 23, 2036	August 3, 2054

=== Metonic series ===
The metonic series repeats eclipses every 19 years (6939.69 days), lasting about 5 cycles. Eclipses occur in nearly the same calendar date. In addition, the octon subseries repeats 1/5 of that or every 3.8 years (1387.94 days). All eclipses in this table occur at the Moon's ascending node.

21 eclipse events between June 21, 1982 and June 21, 2058
June 21	April 8–9	January 26	November 13–14	September 1–2
117	119	121	123	125
June 21, 1982	April 9, 1986	January 26, 1990	November 13, 1993	September 2, 1997
127	129	131	133	135
June 21, 2001	April 8, 2005	January 26, 2009	November 13, 2012	September 1, 2016
137	139	141	143	145
June 21, 2020	April 8, 2024	January 26, 2028	November 14, 2031	September 2, 2035
147	149	151	153	155
June 21, 2039	April 9, 2043	January 26, 2047	November 14, 2050	September 2, 2054
157
June 21, 2058

=== Tritos series ===
This eclipse is a part of a tritos cycle, repeating at alternating nodes every 135 synodic months (≈ 3986.63 days, or 11 years minus 1 month). Their appearance and longitude are irregular due to a lack of synchronization with the anomalistic month (period of perigee), but groupings of 3 tritos cycles (≈ 33 years minus 3 months) come close (≈ 434.044 anomalistic months), so eclipses are similar in these groupings.

The partial solar eclipses on March 27, 1884 (part of Saros 108) and December 24, 1916 (part of Saros 111) are also a part of this series but are not included in the table below.

Series members between 1971 and 2200
July 22, 1971 (Saros 116)	June 21, 1982 (Saros 117)	May 21, 1993 (Saros 118)	April 19, 2004 (Saros 119)	March 20, 2015 (Saros 120)
February 17, 2026 (Saros 121)	January 16, 2037 (Saros 122)	December 16, 2047 (Saros 123)	November 16, 2058 (Saros 124)	October 15, 2069 (Saros 125)
September 13, 2080 (Saros 126)	August 15, 2091 (Saros 127)	July 15, 2102 (Saros 128)	June 13, 2113 (Saros 129)	May 14, 2124 (Saros 130)
April 13, 2135 (Saros 131)	March 12, 2146 (Saros 132)	February 9, 2157 (Saros 133)	January 10, 2168 (Saros 134)	December 9, 2178 (Saros 135)
November 8, 2189 (Saros 136)	October 9, 2200 (Saros 137)			

=== Inex series ===
This eclipse is a part of the long period inex cycle, repeating at alternating nodes, every 358 synodic months (≈ 10,571.95 days, or 29 years minus 20 days). Their appearance and longitude are irregular due to a lack of synchronization with the anomalistic month (period of perigee). However, groupings of 3 inex cycles (≈ 87 years minus 2 months) comes close (≈ 1,151.02 anomalistic months), so eclipses are similar in these groupings.

Series members between 1801 and 2200
October 19, 1808 (Saros 111)		
August 20, 1895 (Saros 114)	July 31, 1924 (Saros 115)	July 11, 1953 (Saros 116)
June 21, 1982 (Saros 117)	June 1, 2011 (Saros 118)	May 11, 2040 (Saros 119)
April 21, 2069 (Saros 120)	April 1, 2098 (Saros 121)	March 13, 2127 (Saros 122)
February 21, 2156 (Saros 123)	January 31, 2185 (Saros 124)	
