= Solar eclipse of May 21, 1993 =

20th-century partial solar eclipse

- Partial eclipse
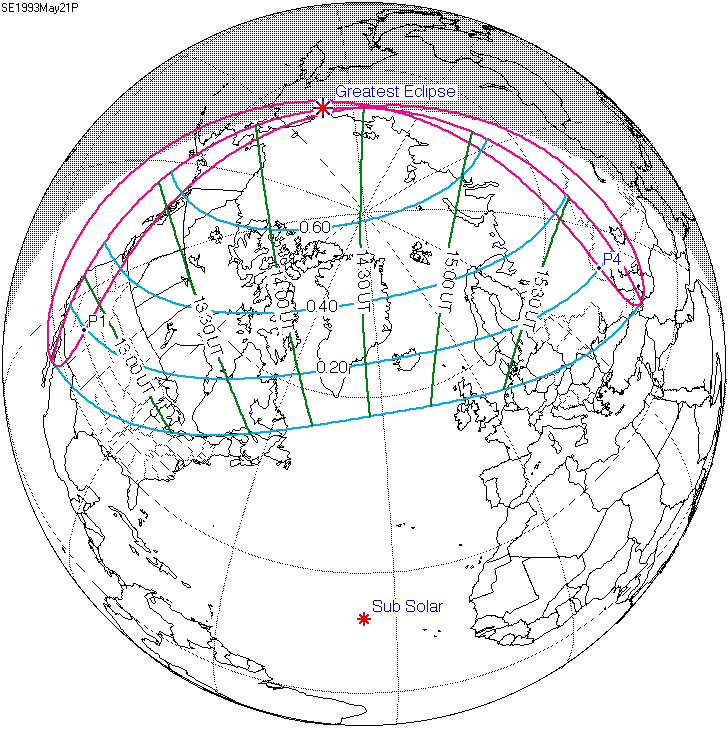
- Map
- Gamma: 1.1372
- Magnitude: 0.7352

Maximum eclipse
- Coordinates: 68.8°N 162.3°E

Times (UTC)
- Greatest eclipse: 14:20:15

References
- Saros: 118 (67 of 72)
- Catalog # (SE5000): 9493

A partial solar eclipse occurred at the Moon's descending node of orbit on Friday, May 21, 1993, with a magnitude of 0.7352. A solar eclipse occurs when the Moon passes between Earth and the Sun, thereby totally or partly obscuring the image of the Sun for a viewer on Earth. A partial solar eclipse occurs in the polar regions of the Earth when the center of the Moon's shadow misses the Earth.

A partial eclipse was visible for parts of Alaska, Canada, Greenland, the United States, and Northern Europe.

== Eclipse timing ==
=== Places experiencing partial eclipse ===
Solar Eclipse of May 21, 1993 (Local Times)
Country or territory	City or place	Start of partial eclipse	Maximum eclipse	End of partial eclipse	Duration of eclipse (hr:min)	Maximum coverage
United States	Los Angeles	05:47:25 (sunrise)	05:51:26	06:22:31	0:35	8.31%
United States	San Francisco	05:55:05 (sunrise)	06:01:15	06:36:01	0:41	15.29%
United States	Seattle	05:25:53	06:11:07	06:58:53	1:34	29.08%
Canada	Vancouver	05:27:36	06:13:58	07:02:56	1:35	31.65%
Canada	Calgary	06:26:55	07:14:01	08:03:56	1:37	28.29%
Canada	Edmonton	06:29:34	07:18:16	08:09:53	1:40	30.91%
United States	Anchorage	04:57:31 (sunrise)	05:44:00	06:37:02	1:40	55.86%
Canada	Inuvik	06:54:44	07:49:15	08:45:51	1:51	53.41%
Greenland	Nuuk	11:20:14	12:09:32	12:59:57	1:40	11.96%
Greenland	Pituffik	10:14:59	11:13:47	12:13:43	1:59	36.41%
Greenland	Qaanaaq	11:15:59	12:14:56	13:14:57	1:59	37.80%
Russia	Pevek (Note: The times listed for this location occur on May 22, 1993, local time.)	02:22:42	03:15:04	04:08:04	1:45	65.75%
Russia	Anadyr	03:26:52 (sunrise)	03:35:46	03:58:50	0:32	27.69%
Russia	Tiksi	23:46:01	00:38:47 (Note: The time listed here for this location occurs on May 22, 1993, local time.)	01:31:10	1:45	62.75%
Iceland	Reykjavík	14:00:36	14:45:22	15:29:24	1:29	7.89%
Svalbard and Jan Mayen	Longyearbyen	15:53:09	16:51:02	17:47:39	1:55	36.79%
Russia	Khatanga	21:58:29	22:51:51	23:44:16	1:46	56.65%
Kazakhstan	Astana	21:49:01	22:02:13	22:06:16 (sunset)	0:17	8.02%
Russia	Belushya Guba	18:13:05	19:07:42	20:00:25	1:47	38.95%
Finland	Rovaniemi	17:24:34	18:16:00	19:05:14	1:41	22.26%
Norway	Oslo	16:42:34	17:22:26	18:00:38	1:18	7.25%
Sweden	Stockholm	16:46:17	17:27:18	18:06:30	1:20	8.94%
Finland	Helsinki	17:43:49	18:28:02	19:10:10	1:26	12.82%
Kazakhstan	Petropavl	21:43:20	22:28:37	22:33:55 (sunset)	0:51	28.50%
Estonia	Tallinn	17:46:17	18:29:22	19:10:26	1:24	11.72%
Latvia	Riga	17:55:17	18:33:53	19:10:44	1:15	8.14%
Russia	Moscow	18:56:17	19:37:26	20:16:39	1:20	12.67%
Belarus	Minsk	18:06:17	18:40:13	19:12:41	1:06	5.80%
Poland	Warsaw	17:17:39	17:41:40	18:04:54	0:47	1.78%
Kazakhstan	Oral	20:02:38	20:41:42	21:19:05	1:16	13.89%

== Eclipse details ==
Shown below are two tables displaying details about this particular solar eclipse. The first table outlines times at which the Moon's penumbra or umbra attains the specific parameter, and the second table describes various other parameters pertaining to this eclipse.

May 21, 1993 Solar Eclipse Times
Event	Time (UTC)
First Penumbral External Contact	1993 May 21 at 12:19:45.7 UTC
Ecliptic Conjunction	1993 May 21 at 14:07:30.6 UTC
Greatest Eclipse	1993 May 21 at 14:20:14.6 UTC
Equatorial Conjunction	1993 May 21 at 14:34:45.0 UTC
Last Penumbral External Contact	1993 May 21 at 16:20:31.6 UTC

May 21, 1993 Solar Eclipse Parameters
Parameter	Value
Eclipse Magnitude	0.73519
Eclipse Obscuration	0.65896
Gamma	1.13720
Sun Right Ascension	03h53m29.8s
Sun Declination	+20°15'44.4"
Sun Semi-Diameter	15'48.0"
Sun Equatorial Horizontal Parallax	08.7"
Moon Right Ascension	03h52m59.3s
Moon Declination	+21°18'54.5"
Moon Semi-Diameter	15'16.2"
Moon Equatorial Horizontal Parallax	0°56'02.5"
ΔT	59.4 s

== Eclipse season ==
This eclipse is part of an eclipse season, a period, roughly every six months, when eclipses occur. Only two (or occasionally three) eclipse seasons occur each year, and each season lasts about 35 days and repeats just short of six months (173 days) later; thus two full eclipse seasons always occur each year. Either two or three eclipses happen each eclipse season. In the sequence below, each eclipse is separated by a fortnight.

Eclipse season of May–June 1993
May 21 Descending node (new moon)	June 4 Ascending node (full moon)
Partial solar eclipse Solar Saros 118	Total lunar eclipse Lunar Saros 130

== Related eclipses ==
=== Eclipses in 1993 ===
- A partial solar eclipse on May 21.
- A total lunar eclipse on June 4.
- A partial solar eclipse on November 13.
- A total lunar eclipse on November 29.

=== Metonic ===
- Followed by: Solar eclipse of March 9, 1997

=== Tzolkinex ===
- Preceded by: Solar eclipse of April 9, 1986
- Followed by: Solar eclipse of July 1, 2000

=== Half-Saros ===
- Preceded by: Lunar eclipse of May 15, 1984
- Followed by: Lunar eclipse of May 26, 2002

=== Tritos ===
- Preceded by: Solar eclipse of June 21, 1982
- Followed by: Solar eclipse of April 19, 2004

=== Solar Saros 118 ===
- Preceded by: Solar eclipse of May 11, 1975
- Followed by: Solar eclipse of June 1, 2011

=== Inex ===
- Preceded by: Solar eclipse of June 10, 1964
- Followed by: Solar eclipse of April 30, 2022

=== Triad ===
- Preceded by: Solar eclipse of July 21, 1906
- Followed by: Solar eclipse of March 21, 2080

=== Solar eclipses of 1993–1996 ===
This eclipse is a member of a semester series. An eclipse in a semester series of solar eclipses repeats approximately every 177 days and 4 hours (a semester) at alternating nodes of the Moon's orbit.

Solar eclipse series sets from 1993 to 1996
Descending node			Ascending node		
Saros	Map	Gamma	Saros	Map	Gamma
118	May 21, 1993 Partial	1.1372	123	November 13, 1993 Partial	−1.0411
128 Partial in Bismarck, ND, USA	May 10, 1994 Annular	0.4077	133 Totality in Bolivia	November 3, 1994 Total	−0.3522
138	April 29, 1995 Annular	−0.3382	143 Totality in Dundlod, India	October 24, 1995 Total	0.3518
148	April 17, 1996 Partial	−1.058	153	October 12, 1996 Partial	1.1227

=== Saros 118 ===
This eclipse is a part of Saros series 118, repeating every 18 years, 11 days, and containing 72 events. The series started with a partial solar eclipse on May 24, 803 AD. It contains total eclipses from August 19, 947 AD through October 25, 1650; hybrid eclipses on November 4, 1668 and November 15, 1686; and annular eclipses from November 27, 1704 through April 30, 1957. The series ends at member 72 as a partial eclipse on July 15, 2083. Its eclipses are tabulated in three columns; every third eclipse in the same column is one exeligmos apart, so they all cast shadows over approximately the same parts of the Earth.

The longest duration of totality was produced by member 34 at 6 minutes, 59 seconds on May 16, 1398, and the longest duration of annularity was produced by member 59 at 1 minutes, 58 seconds on February 23, 1849. All eclipses in this series occur at the Moon’s descending node of orbit.

Series members 57–72 occur between 1801 and 2083:
57	58	59
February 1, 1813	February 12, 1831	February 23, 1849
60	61	62
March 6, 1867	March 16, 1885	March 29, 1903
63	64	65
April 8, 1921	April 19, 1939	April 30, 1957
66	67	68
May 11, 1975	May 21, 1993	June 1, 2011
69	70	71
June 12, 2029	June 23, 2047	July 3, 2065
72
July 15, 2083

=== Metonic series ===
The metonic series repeats eclipses every 19 years (6939.69 days), lasting about 5 cycles. Eclipses occur in nearly the same calendar date. In addition, the octon subseries repeats 1/5 of that or every 3.8 years (1387.94 days). All eclipses in this table occur at the Moon's descending node.

21 eclipse events between May 21, 1993 and May 20, 2069
May 20–21	March 9	December 25–26	October 13–14	August 1–2
118	120	122	124	126
May 21, 1993	March 9, 1997	December 25, 2000	October 14, 2004	August 1, 2008
128	130	132	134	136
May 20, 2012	March 9, 2016	December 26, 2019	October 14, 2023	August 2, 2027
138	140	142	144	146
May 21, 2031	March 9, 2035	December 26, 2038	October 14, 2042	August 2, 2046
148	150	152	154	156
May 20, 2050	March 9, 2054	December 26, 2057	October 13, 2061	August 2, 2065
158
May 20, 2069

=== Tritos series ===
This eclipse is a part of a tritos cycle, repeating at alternating nodes every 135 synodic months (≈ 3986.63 days, or 11 years minus 1 month). Their appearance and longitude are irregular due to a lack of synchronization with the anomalistic month (period of perigee), but groupings of 3 tritos cycles (≈ 33 years minus 3 months) come close (≈ 434.044 anomalistic months), so eclipses are similar in these groupings.

The partial solar eclipses on March 27, 1884 (part of Saros 108) and December 24, 1916 (part of Saros 111) are also a part of this series but are not included in the table below.

Series members between 1971 and 2200
July 22, 1971 (Saros 116)	June 21, 1982 (Saros 117)	May 21, 1993 (Saros 118)	April 19, 2004 (Saros 119)	March 20, 2015 (Saros 120)
February 17, 2026 (Saros 121)	January 16, 2037 (Saros 122)	December 16, 2047 (Saros 123)	November 16, 2058 (Saros 124)	October 15, 2069 (Saros 125)
September 13, 2080 (Saros 126)	August 15, 2091 (Saros 127)	July 15, 2102 (Saros 128)	June 13, 2113 (Saros 129)	May 14, 2124 (Saros 130)
April 13, 2135 (Saros 131)	March 12, 2146 (Saros 132)	February 9, 2157 (Saros 133)	January 10, 2168 (Saros 134)	December 9, 2178 (Saros 135)
November 8, 2189 (Saros 136)	October 9, 2200 (Saros 137)			

=== Inex series ===
This eclipse is a part of the long period inex cycle, repeating at alternating nodes, every 358 synodic months (≈ 10,571.95 days, or 29 years minus 20 days). Their appearance and longitude are irregular due to a lack of synchronization with the anomalistic month (period of perigee). However, groupings of 3 inex cycles (≈ 87 years minus 2 months) comes close (≈ 1,151.02 anomalistic months), so eclipses are similar in these groupings.

Series members between 1801 and 2200
September 19, 1819 (Saros 112)	August 28, 1848 (Saros 113)	August 9, 1877 (Saros 114)
July 21, 1906 (Saros 115)	June 30, 1935 (Saros 116)	June 10, 1964 (Saros 117)
May 21, 1993 (Saros 118)	April 30, 2022 (Saros 119)	April 11, 2051 (Saros 120)
March 21, 2080 (Saros 121)	March 1, 2109 (Saros 122)	February 9, 2138 (Saros 123)
January 21, 2167 (Saros 124)	December 31, 2195 (Saros 125)	
