= Solar eclipse of April 19, 1939 =

20th-century annular solar eclipse

- Annular eclipse
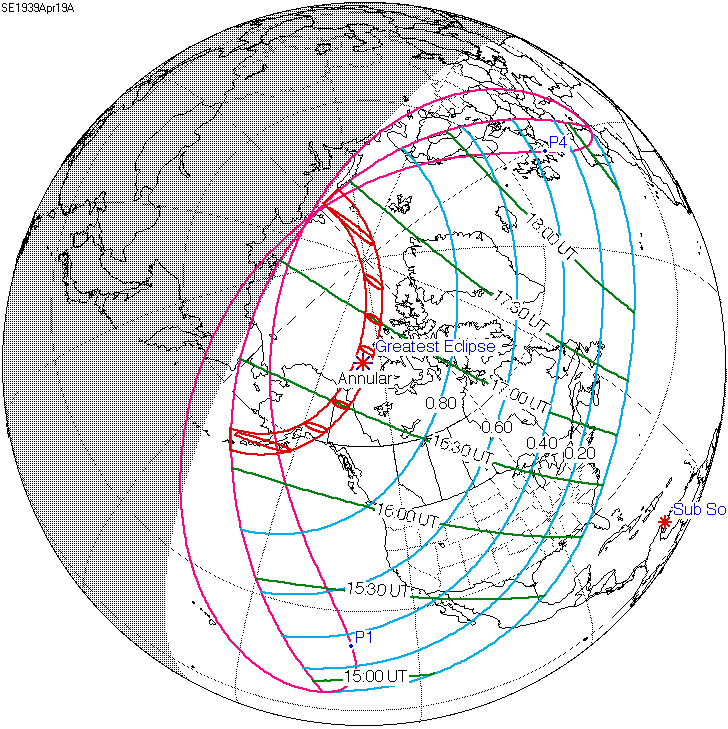
- Map
- Gamma: 0.9388
- Magnitude: 0.9731

Maximum eclipse
- Duration: 109 s (1 min 49 s)
- Coordinates: 73.1°N 129.1°W
- Max. width of band: 285 km (177 mi)

Times (UTC)
- Greatest eclipse: 16:45:53

References
- Saros: 118 (64 of 72)
- Catalog # (SE5000): 9373

An annular solar eclipse occurred at the Moon's descending node of orbit on Wednesday, April 19, 1939, with a magnitude of 0.9731. A solar eclipse occurs when the Moon passes between Earth and the Sun, thereby totally or partly obscuring the image of the Sun for a viewer on Earth. An annular solar eclipse occurs when the Moon's apparent diameter is smaller than the Sun's, blocking most of the Sun's light and causing the Sun to look like an annulus (ring). An annular eclipse appears as a partial eclipse over a region of the Earth thousands of kilometres wide. Occurring about 6.3 days after apogee (on April 13, 1939, at 9:10 UTC), the Moon's apparent diameter was smaller.

This annular eclipse is notable in that the path of annularity passed over the North Pole. Land covered in the path include part of Alaska, Canada, and Franz Josef Land, Ushakov Island and Vize Island in the Soviet Union (today's Russia). A partial eclipse was visible for parts of North America and Western Europe. This was umbral eclipse number 56 out of 57 in Solar Saros 118, this is the last central solar eclipse, and the penultimate umbral eclipse, with the last (ultimate) one in 1957.

== Eclipse details ==
Shown below are two tables displaying details about this particular solar eclipse. The first table outlines times at which the Moon's penumbra or umbra attains the specific parameter, and the second table describes various other parameters pertaining to this eclipse.

April 19, 1939 Solar Eclipse Times
Event	Time (UTC)
First Penumbral External Contact	1939 April 19 at 14:26:23.5 UTC
First Umbral External Contact	1939 April 19 at 16:04:52.6 UTC
First Central Line	1939 April 19 at 16:07:51.0 UTC
Greatest Duration	1939 April 19 at 16:07:51.0 UTC
First Umbral Internal Contact	1939 April 19 at 16:11:02.6 UTC
Ecliptic Conjunction	1939 April 19 at 16:35:25.0 UTC
Greatest Eclipse	1939 April 19 at 16:45:53.4 UTC
Equatorial Conjunction	1939 April 19 at 17:14:29.6 UTC
Last Umbral Internal Contact	1939 April 19 at 17:20:26.2 UTC
Last Central Line	1939 April 19 at 17:23:34.9 UTC
Last Umbral External Contact	1939 April 19 at 17:26:30.4 UTC
Last Penumbral External Contact	1939 April 19 at 19:05:03.9 UTC

April 19, 1939 Solar Eclipse Parameters
Parameter	Value
Eclipse Magnitude	0.97308
Eclipse Obscuration	0.94689
Gamma	0.93880
Sun Right Ascension	01h46m48.0s
Sun Declination	+11°01'35.5"
Sun Semi-Diameter	15'55.2"
Sun Equatorial Horizontal Parallax	08.8"
Moon Right Ascension	01h45m51.4s
Moon Declination	+11°52'43.4"
Moon Semi-Diameter	15'25.0"
Moon Equatorial Horizontal Parallax	0°56'34.8"
ΔT	24.1 s

== Eclipse season ==
This eclipse is part of an eclipse season, a period, roughly every six months, when eclipses occur. Only two (or occasionally three) eclipse seasons occur each year, and each season lasts about 35 days and repeats just short of six months (173 days) later; thus two full eclipse seasons always occur each year. Either two or three eclipses happen each eclipse season. In the sequence below, each eclipse is separated by a fortnight.

Eclipse season of April–May 1939
April 19 Descending node (new moon)	May 3 Ascending node (full moon)
Annular solar eclipse Solar Saros 118	Total lunar eclipse Lunar Saros 130

== Related eclipses ==
=== Eclipses in 1939 ===
- An annular solar eclipse on April 19.
- A total lunar eclipse on May 3.
- A total solar eclipse on October 12.
- A partial lunar eclipse on October 28.

=== Metonic ===
- Preceded by: Solar eclipse of June 30, 1935
- Followed by: Solar eclipse of February 4, 1943

=== Tzolkinex ===
- Preceded by: Solar eclipse of March 7, 1932
- Followed by: Solar eclipse of May 30, 1946

=== Half-Saros ===
- Preceded by: Lunar eclipse of April 13, 1930
- Followed by: Lunar eclipse of April 23, 1948

=== Tritos ===
- Preceded by: Solar eclipse of May 19, 1928
- Followed by: Solar eclipse of March 18, 1950

=== Solar Saros 118 ===
- Preceded by: Solar eclipse of April 8, 1921
- Followed by: Solar eclipse of April 30, 1957

=== Inex ===
- Preceded by: Solar eclipse of May 9, 1910
- Followed by: Solar eclipse of March 28, 1968

=== Triad ===
- Preceded by: Solar eclipse of June 17, 1852
- Followed by: Solar eclipse of February 17, 2026

=== Solar eclipses of 1939–1942 ===
This eclipse is a member of a semester series. An eclipse in a semester series of solar eclipses repeats approximately every 177 days and 4 hours (a semester) at alternating nodes of the Moon's orbit.

The partial solar eclipse on August 12, 1942 occurs in the next lunar year eclipse set.

Solar eclipse series sets from 1939 to 1942
Descending node			Ascending node		
Saros	Map	Gamma	Saros	Map	Gamma
118	April 19, 1939 Annular	0.9388	123	October 12, 1939 Total	−0.9737
128	April 7, 1940 Annular	0.219	133	October 1, 1940 Total	−0.2573
138	March 27, 1941 Annular	−0.5025	143	September 21, 1941 Total	0.4649
148	March 16, 1942 Partial	−1.1908	153	September 10, 1942 Partial	1.2571

=== Saros 118 ===
This eclipse is a part of Saros series 118, repeating every 18 years, 11 days, and containing 72 events. The series started with a partial solar eclipse on May 24, 803 AD. It contains total eclipses from August 19, 947 AD through October 25, 1650; hybrid eclipses on November 4, 1668 and November 15, 1686; and annular eclipses from November 27, 1704 through April 30, 1957. The series ends at member 72 as a partial eclipse on July 15, 2083. Its eclipses are tabulated in three columns; every third eclipse in the same column is one exeligmos apart, so they all cast shadows over approximately the same parts of the Earth.

The longest duration of totality was produced by member 34 at 6 minutes, 59 seconds on May 16, 1398, and the longest duration of annularity was produced by member 59 at 1 minutes, 58 seconds on February 23, 1849. All eclipses in this series occur at the Moon’s descending node of orbit.

Series members 57–72 occur between 1801 and 2083:
57	58	59
February 1, 1813	February 12, 1831	February 23, 1849
60	61	62
March 6, 1867	March 16, 1885	March 29, 1903
63	64	65
April 8, 1921	April 19, 1939	April 30, 1957
66	67	68
May 11, 1975	May 21, 1993	June 1, 2011
69	70	71
June 12, 2029	June 23, 2047	July 3, 2065
72
July 15, 2083

=== Metonic series ===
The metonic series repeats eclipses every 19 years (6939.69 days), lasting about 5 cycles. Eclipses occur in nearly the same calendar date. In addition, the octon subseries repeats 1/5 of that or every 3.8 years (1387.94 days). All eclipses in this table occur at the Moon's descending node.

22 eclipse events between September 12, 1931 and July 1, 2011
September 11–12	June 30–July 1	April 17–19	February 4–5	November 22–23
114	116	118	120	122
September 12, 1931	June 30, 1935	April 19, 1939	February 4, 1943	November 23, 1946
124	126	128	130	132
September 12, 1950	June 30, 1954	April 19, 1958	February 5, 1962	November 23, 1965
134	136	138	140	142
September 11, 1969	June 30, 1973	April 18, 1977	February 4, 1981	November 22, 1984
144	146	148	150	152
September 11, 1988	June 30, 1992	April 17, 1996	February 5, 2000	November 23, 2003
154	156			
September 11, 2007	July 1, 2011			

=== Tritos series ===
This eclipse is a part of a tritos cycle, repeating at alternating nodes every 135 synodic months (≈ 3986.63 days, or 11 years minus 1 month). Their appearance and longitude are irregular due to a lack of synchronization with the anomalistic month (period of perigee), but groupings of 3 tritos cycles (≈ 33 years minus 3 months) come close (≈ 434.044 anomalistic months), so eclipses are similar in these groupings.

Series members between 1801 and 2200
March 25, 1819 (Saros 107)	February 23, 1830 (Saros 108)	January 22, 1841 (Saros 109)		November 21, 1862 (Saros 111)
		August 20, 1895 (Saros 114)	July 21, 1906 (Saros 115)	June 19, 1917 (Saros 116)
May 19, 1928 (Saros 117)	April 19, 1939 (Saros 118)	March 18, 1950 (Saros 119)	February 15, 1961 (Saros 120)	January 16, 1972 (Saros 121)
December 15, 1982 (Saros 122)	November 13, 1993 (Saros 123)	October 14, 2004 (Saros 124)	September 13, 2015 (Saros 125)	August 12, 2026 (Saros 126)
July 13, 2037 (Saros 127)	June 11, 2048 (Saros 128)	May 11, 2059 (Saros 129)	April 11, 2070 (Saros 130)	March 10, 2081 (Saros 131)
February 7, 2092 (Saros 132)	January 8, 2103 (Saros 133)	December 8, 2113 (Saros 134)	November 6, 2124 (Saros 135)	October 7, 2135 (Saros 136)
September 6, 2146 (Saros 137)	August 5, 2157 (Saros 138)	July 5, 2168 (Saros 139)	June 5, 2179 (Saros 140)	May 4, 2190 (Saros 141)

=== Inex series ===
This eclipse is a part of the long period inex cycle, repeating at alternating nodes, every 358 synodic months (≈ 10,571.95 days, or 29 years minus 20 days). Their appearance and longitude are irregular due to a lack of synchronization with the anomalistic month (period of perigee). However, groupings of 3 inex cycles (≈ 87 years minus 2 months) comes close (≈ 1,151.02 anomalistic months), so eclipses are similar in these groupings.

Series members between 1801 and 2200
July 8, 1823 (Saros 114)	June 17, 1852 (Saros 115)	May 27, 1881 (Saros 116)
May 9, 1910 (Saros 117)	April 19, 1939 (Saros 118)	March 28, 1968 (Saros 119)
March 9, 1997 (Saros 120)	February 17, 2026 (Saros 121)	January 27, 2055 (Saros 122)
January 7, 2084 (Saros 123)	December 19, 2112 (Saros 124)	November 28, 2141 (Saros 125)
November 8, 2170 (Saros 126)	October 19, 2199 (Saros 127)	
