= Solar Saros 116 =

Saros cycle series 116 for solar eclipses

Historic saros cycle animation

Saros cycle series 116 for solar eclipses occurred at the Moon's descending node, repeating every 18 years, 11 days, containing 70 eclipses, 53 of which were umbral (all annular). The first eclipse was on 23 June 727 and the last eclipse was on 22 July 1971, making it the last saros cycle to end. (Next cycle to end is Saros 117, which will have its last eclipse in 2054.)

The longest eclipse was 12 minutes 2 seconds on 25 December 1628.

This solar saros was linked to Lunar Saros 109.

== Umbral eclipses ==
Umbral eclipses (annular, total and hybrid) can be further classified as either: 1) Central (two limits), 2) Central (one limit) or 3) Non-Central (one limit). The statistical distribution of these classes in Saros series 116 appears in the following table.

Classification	Number	Percent
All Umbral eclipses	53	100.00%
Central (two limits)	52	98.11%
Central (one limit)	1	1.89%
Non-central (one limit)	0	0.00%

== All eclipses ==
Note: Dates are given in the Julian calendar prior to 15 October 1582, and in the Gregorian calendar after that.

Saros	Member	Date	Time (Greatest) UTC	Type	Location Lat, Long	Gamma	Mag.	Width (km)	Duration (min:sec)	Ref
116	1	June 23, 727	22:34:35	Partial	65.4S 161.5W	-1.4763	0.1082			
116	2	July 4, 745	5:53:18	Partial	64.5S 78.2E	-1.4085	0.2381			
116	3	July 15, 763	13:14:24	Partial	63.7S 42.4W	-1.3432	0.3625			
116	4	July 25, 781	20:37:53	Partial	62.9S 163.3W	-1.2802	0.4816			
116	5	August 6, 799	4:06:08	Partial	62.2S 74.8E	-1.2217	0.591			
116	6	August 16, 817	11:38:18	Partial	61.7S 47.8W	-1.167	0.6921			
116	7	August 27, 835	19:17:30	Partial	61.3S 172W	-1.1186	0.7805			
116	8	September 7, 853	3:02:42	Partial	61S 62.3E	-1.0755	0.8578			
116	9	September 18, 871	10:54:51	Partial	60.9S 64.9W	-1.0389	0.9224			
116	10	September 28, 889	18:54:00	Partial	61S 166.1E	-1.0086	0.9748			
116	11	October 10, 907	3:00:37	Annular	62.7S 54.1E	-0.9851	0.9869	291	0m 47s	
116	12	October 20, 925	11:14:00	Annular	64.9S 67W	-0.9677	0.9827	250	1m 3s	
116	13	October 31, 943	19:32:08	Annular	67.8S 166.7E	-0.9548	0.9783	265	1m 19s	
116	14	November 11, 961	3:56:16	Annular	71.3S 35.8E	-0.9475	0.9739	298	1m 35s	
116	15	November 22, 979	12:23:31	Annular	75S 98.4W	-0.9439	0.9699	335	1m 49s	
116	16	December 2, 997	20:53:29	Annular	78.7S 123.3E	-0.9429	0.9663	374	2m 2s	
116	17	December 14, 1015	5:22:20	Annular	82.5S 19.5W	-0.942	0.9633	407	2m 14s	
116	18	December 24, 1033	13:51:14	Annular	85.6S 179.6W	-0.9418	0.9609	434	2m 24s	
116	19	January 4, 1052	22:16:17	Annular	86.3S 14.2W	-0.9395	0.9591	446	2m 33s	
116	20	January 15, 1070	6:37:03	Annular	83.3S 174.7E	-0.9346	0.958	440	2m 42s	
116	21	January 26, 1088	14:50:56	Annular	78.9S 29.2E	-0.9249	0.9575	415	2m 50s	
116	22	February 5, 1106	22:58:18	Annular	73.6S 106.6W	-0.9106	0.9575	378	2m 59s	
116	23	February 17, 1124	6:56:07	Annular	67.5S 123E	-0.8893	0.9581	335	3m 8s	
116	24	February 27, 1142	14:45:00	Annular	60.8S 2.9W	-0.8615	0.9589	293	3m 17s	
116	25	March 9, 1160	22:23:38	Annular	53.5S 124.9W	-0.8259	0.9599	256	3m 28s	
116	26	March 21, 1178	5:53:15	Annular	46S 116.4E	-0.7838	0.961	225	3m 39s	
116	27	March 31, 1196	13:11:09	Annular	38.1S 1.4E	-0.7326	0.9621	200	3m 52s	
116	28	April 11, 1214	20:20:49	Annular	30.2S 110.8W	-0.6751	0.9629	180	4m 5s	
116	29	April 22, 1232	3:20:16	Annular	22.2S 140.3E	-0.6097	0.9636	165	4m 18s	
116	30	May 3, 1250	10:13:11	Annular	14.6S 33.6E	-0.5397	0.9639	155	4m 32s	
116	31	May 13, 1268	16:56:23	Annular	7.2S 69.9W	-0.4622	0.9638	148	4m 44s	
116	32	May 24, 1286	23:36:15	Annular	0.4S 171.9W	-0.3825	0.9632	144	4m 55s	
116	33	June 4, 1304	6:09:36	Annular	5.9N 88.6E	-0.2977	0.9622	144	5m 4s	
116	34	June 15, 1322	12:41:47	Annular	11.4N 9.8W	-0.2127	0.9607	146	5m 11s	
116	35	June 25, 1340	19:10:38	Annular	16N 106.7W	-0.1253	0.9586	151	5m 17s	
116	36	July 7, 1358	1:41:45	Annular	19.6N 156.6E	-0.0404	0.9562	160	5m 22s	
116	37	July 17, 1376	8:13:14	Annular	22.2N 60.3E	0.0439	0.9533	171	5m 30s	
116	38	July 28, 1394	14:48:17	Annular	23.7N 36.5W	0.1249	0.9501	184	5m 40s	
116	39	August 7, 1412	21:27:46	Annular	24.4N 134.5W	0.2018	0.9465	201	5m 55s	
116	40	August 19, 1430	4:13:52	Annular	24.2N 125.7E	0.2729	0.9428	219	6m 13s	
116	41	August 29, 1448	11:07:05	Annular	23.4N 23.8E	0.338	0.9389	239	6m 37s	
116	42	September 9, 1466	18:07:54	Annular	22.2N 80.5W	0.3966	0.9351	260	7m 5s	
116	43	September 20, 1484	1:17:55	Annular	20.8N 172.4E	0.4474	0.9313	283	7m 39s	
116	44	October 1, 1502	8:36:17	Annular	19.3N 62.8E	0.4913	0.9277	306	8m 16s	
116	45	October 11, 1520	16:03:20	Annular	17.8N 49.4W	0.5277	0.9244	329	8m 57s	
116	46	October 22, 1538	23:38:41	Annular	16.6N 164.1W	0.5572	0.9214	351	9m 41s	
116	47	November 2, 1556	7:22:13	Annular	15.5N 78.9E	0.5798	0.919	370	10m 24s	
116	48	November 13, 1574	15:12:17	Annular	14.8N 40W	0.597	0.9171	387	11m 3s	
116	49	December 3, 1592	23:07:16	Annular	14.5N 160.2W	0.6102	0.9159	401	11m 36s	
116	50	December 15, 1610	7:06:48	Annular	14.7N 78.2E	0.6195	0.9153	409	11m 56s	
116	51	December 25, 1628	15:08:47	Annular	15.4N 44W	0.6265	0.9153	413	12m 2s	
116	52	January 5, 1647	23:10:59	Annular	16.9N 166.5W	0.6336	0.9161	413	11m 50s	
116	53	January 16, 1665	7:11:51	Annular	19.1N 71.2E	0.642	0.9174	409	11m 24s	
116	54	January 27, 1683	15:10:09	Annular	22.1N 50.6W	0.6526	0.9195	401	10m 44s	
116	55	February 7, 1701	23:04:53	Annular	25.9N 171.7W	0.6663	0.9219	393	9m 55s	
116	56	February 19, 1719	6:52:57	Annular	30.5N 68.6E	0.6856	0.925	384	9m 1s	
116	57	March 1, 1737	14:35:17	Annular	36N 50.1W	0.7099	0.9283	378	8m 4s	
116	58	March 12, 1755	22:09:32	Annular	42.2N 167.4W	0.7413	0.9319	375	7m 7s	
116	59	March 23, 1773	5:36:58	Annular	49.3N 76.2E	0.7785	0.9357	378	6m 13s	
116	60	April 3, 1791	12:55:13	Annular	57.1N 39.5W	0.8236	0.9394	394	5m 21s	
116	61	April 14, 1809	20:07:11	Annular	65.8N 157.3W	0.8742	0.9429	435	4m 35s	
116	62	April 26, 1827	3:11:14	Annular	74.8N 73.4E	0.9316	0.9458	559	3m 53s	
116	63	May 6, 1845	10:09:00	Annular	73.4N 110.6W	0.9945	0.9462	-	3m 15s	
116	64	May 17, 1863	17:00:45	Partial	69.2N 126.8E	1.0627	0.8606			
116	65	May 27, 1881	23:48:41	Partial	68.2N 13.3E	1.1345	0.737			
116	66	June 8, 1899	6:33:43	Partial	67.2N 98.9W	1.2089	0.6076			
116	67	June 19, 1917	13:16:21	Partial	66.2N 150.1E	1.2857	0.4729			
116	68	June 30, 1935	19:59:46	Partial	65.2N 39.1E	1.3623	0.3375			
116	69	July 11, 1953	2:44:14	Partial	64.3N 71.7W	1.4388	0.2015			
116	70	July 22, 1971	9:31:55	Partial	63.5N 177E	1.513	0.0689			
