= Solar eclipse of May 9, 1910 =

Total eclipse

- Total eclipse
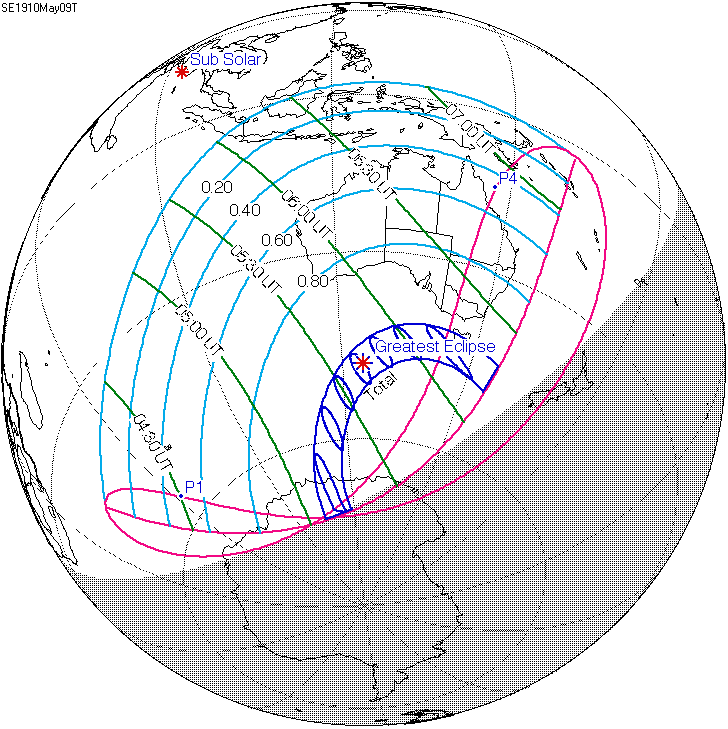
- Map
- Gamma: −0.9437
- Magnitude: 1.06

Maximum eclipse
- Duration: 255 s (4 min 15 s)
- Coordinates: 48.2°S 125.2°E
- Max. width of band: 594 km (369 mi)

Times (UTC)
- Greatest eclipse: 5:42:13

References
- Saros: 117 (63 of 71)
- Catalog # (SE5000): 9304

External image
- https://macdougalldiaries.blogspot.com/2012/08/solar-eclipse-of-sun-9-may-1910.html

A total solar eclipse occurred at the Moon's ascending node of orbit on Monday, May 9, 1910, with a magnitude of 1.06. A solar eclipse occurs when the Moon passes between Earth and the Sun, thereby totally or partly obscuring the image of the Sun for a viewer on Earth. A total solar eclipse occurs when the Moon's apparent diameter is larger than the Sun's, blocking all direct sunlight, turning day into darkness. Totality occurs in a narrow path across Earth's surface, with the partial solar eclipse visible over a surrounding region thousands of kilometres wide. Occurring about 10 hours after perigee (on May 8, 1910, at 19:20 UTC), the Moon's apparent diameter was larger.

Totality was visible from part of Wilkes Land in Antarctica and Tasmania in Australia. A partial eclipse was visible for parts of Antarctica, Australia, and Southeast Asia.

== Observations ==
Except for Antarctica, the only land covered by the path of totality was the central and southern parts of Tasmania. The eclipse occurred in winter when Tasmania is usually rainy with bad observation conditions. However, British pioneer aviator Francis McClean still organized and led a team to Port Davey on the southwestern coast of Tasmania, but in the end failed to make observations due to rainy weather. In addition, observations on Bruny Island, southeast of Tasmania also failed due to the weather. Zeehan and Strahan on the west coast of Tasmania were clear during the partial phase, but had poor weather during the total phase. Queenstown, located slightly inland, was one of the few places where the entire process of the eclipse was seen. Some observers took images of the corona there.

== Eclipse details ==
Shown below are two tables displaying details about this particular solar eclipse. The first table outlines times at which the Moon's penumbra or umbra attains the specific parameter, and the second table describes various other parameters pertaining to this eclipse.

May 9, 1910 Solar Eclipse Times
Event	Time (UTC)
First Penumbral External Contact	1910 May 9 at 03:38:20.0 UTC
Equatorial Conjunction	1910 May 9 at 05:03:20.8 UTC
First Umbral External Contact	1910 May 9 at 05:04:55.4 UTC
First Central Line	1910 May 9 at 05:09:08.5 UTC
First Umbral Internal Contact	1910 May 9 at 05:13:54.4 UTC
Ecliptic Conjunction	1910 May 9 at 05:32:47.7 UTC
Greatest Eclipse	1910 May 9 at 05:42:12.6 UTC
Greatest Duration	1910 May 9 at 05:42:47.5 UTC
Last Umbral Internal Contact	1910 May 9 at 06:10:56.2 UTC
Last Central Line	1910 May 9 at 06:15:41.3 UTC
Last Umbral External Contact	1910 May 9 at 06:19:53.6 UTC
Last Penumbral External Contact	1910 May 9 at 07:46:22.1 UTC

May 9, 1910 Solar Eclipse Parameters
Parameter	Value
Eclipse Magnitude	1.06000
Eclipse Obscuration	1.12360
Gamma	–0.94372
Sun Right Ascension	03h01m00.1s
Sun Declination	+17°07'25.6"
Sun Semi-Diameter	15'50.4"
Sun Equatorial Horizontal Parallax	08.7"
Moon Right Ascension	03h02m29.5s
Moon Declination	+16°13'49.4"
Moon Semi-Diameter	16'42.2"
Moon Equatorial Horizontal Parallax	1°01'18.1"
ΔT	10.8 s

== Eclipse season ==
This eclipse is part of an eclipse season, a period, roughly every six months, when eclipses occur. Only two (or occasionally three) eclipse seasons occur each year, and each season lasts about 35 days and repeats just short of six months (173 days) later; thus two full eclipse seasons always occur each year. Either two or three eclipses happen each eclipse season. In the sequence below, each eclipse is separated by a fortnight. The first and last eclipse in this sequence is separated by one synodic month.

Eclipse season of May 1910
May 9 Ascending node (new moon)	May 24 Descending node (full moon)
Total solar eclipse Solar Saros 117	Total lunar eclipse Lunar Saros 129

== Related eclipses ==
=== Eclipses in 1910 ===
- A total solar eclipse on May 9
- A total lunar eclipse on May 24
- A partial solar eclipse on November 2
- A total lunar eclipse on November 17

=== Metonic ===
- Preceded by: Solar eclipse of July 21, 1906
- Followed by: Solar eclipse of February 25, 1914

=== Tzolkinex ===
- Preceded by: Solar eclipse of March 29, 1903
- Followed by: Solar eclipse of June 19, 1917

=== Half-Saros ===
- Preceded by: Lunar eclipse of May 3, 1901
- Followed by: Lunar eclipse of May 15, 1919

=== Tritos ===
- Preceded by: Solar eclipse of June 8, 1899
- Followed by: Solar eclipse of April 8, 1921

=== Solar Saros 117 ===
- Preceded by: Solar eclipse of April 26, 1892
- Followed by: Solar eclipse of May 19, 1928

=== Inex ===
- Preceded by: Solar eclipse of May 27, 1881
- Followed by: Solar eclipse of April 19, 1939

=== Triad ===
- Preceded by: Solar eclipse of July 8, 1823
- Followed by: Solar eclipse of March 9, 1997

=== Solar eclipses of 1910–1913 ===
This eclipse is a member of a semester series. An eclipse in a semester series of solar eclipses repeats approximately every 177 days and 4 hours (a semester) at alternating nodes of the Moon's orbit.

The partial solar eclipse on August 31, 1913 occurs in the next lunar year eclipse set.

Solar eclipse series sets from 1910 to 1913
Ascending node			Descending node		
Saros	Map	Gamma	Saros	Map	Gamma
117	May 9, 1910 Total	−0.9437	122	November 2, 1910 Partial	1.0603
127	April 28, 1911 Total	−0.2294	132	October 22, 1911 Annular	0.3224
137	April 17, 1912 Hybrid	0.528	142	October 10, 1912 Total	−0.4149
147	April 6, 1913 Partial	1.3147	152	September 30, 1913 Partial	−1.1005

=== Saros 117 ===
This eclipse is a part of Saros series 117, repeating every 18 years, 11 days, and containing 71 events. The series started with a partial solar eclipse on June 24, 792 AD. It contains annular eclipses from September 18, 936 AD through May 14, 1333; hybrid eclipses from May 25, 1351 through July 8, 1423; and total eclipses from July 18, 1441 through May 19, 1928. The series ends at member 71 as a partial eclipse on August 3, 2054. Its eclipses are tabulated in three columns; every third eclipse in the same column is one exeligmos apart, so they all cast shadows over approximately the same parts of the Earth.

The longest duration of annularity was produced by member 16 at 9 minutes, 26 seconds on December 3, 1062, and the longest duration of totality was produced by member 62 at 4 minutes, 19 seconds on April 26, 1892. All eclipses in this series occur at the Moon’s ascending node of orbit.

Series members 57–71 occur between 1801 and 2054:
57	58	59
March 4, 1802	March 14, 1820	March 25, 1838
60	61	62
April 5, 1856	April 16, 1874	April 26, 1892
63	64	65
May 9, 1910	May 19, 1928	May 30, 1946
66	67	68
June 10, 1964	June 21, 1982	July 1, 2000
69	70	71
July 13, 2018	July 23, 2036	August 3, 2054

=== Metonic series ===
The metonic series repeats eclipses every 19 years (6939.69 days), lasting about 5 cycles. Eclipses occur in nearly the same calendar date. In addition, the octon subseries repeats 1/5 of that or every 3.8 years (1387.94 days). All eclipses in this table occur at the Moon's ascending node.

22 eclipse events between December 13, 1898 and July 20, 1982
December 13–14	October 1–2	July 20–21	May 9	February 24–25
111	113	115	117	119
December 13, 1898		July 21, 1906	May 9, 1910	February 25, 1914
121	123	125	127	129
December 14, 1917	October 1, 1921	July 20, 1925	May 9, 1929	February 24, 1933
131	133	135	137	139
December 13, 1936	October 1, 1940	July 20, 1944	May 9, 1948	February 25, 1952
141	143	145	147	149
December 14, 1955	October 2, 1959	July 20, 1963	May 9, 1967	February 25, 1971
151	153	155		
December 13, 1974	October 2, 1978	July 20, 1982		

=== Tritos series ===
This eclipse is a part of a tritos cycle, repeating at alternating nodes every 135 synodic months (≈ 3986.63 days, or 11 years minus 1 month). Their appearance and longitude are irregular due to a lack of synchronization with the anomalistic month (period of perigee), but groupings of 3 tritos cycles (≈ 33 years minus 3 months) come close (≈ 434.044 anomalistic months), so eclipses are similar in these groupings.

Series members between 1801 and 2200
March 14, 1801 (Saros 107)	February 12, 1812 (Saros 108)	January 12, 1823 (Saros 109)		November 10, 1844 (Saros 111)
		August 9, 1877 (Saros 114)	July 9, 1888 (Saros 115)	June 8, 1899 (Saros 116)
May 9, 1910 (Saros 117)	April 8, 1921 (Saros 118)	March 7, 1932 (Saros 119)	February 4, 1943 (Saros 120)	January 5, 1954 (Saros 121)
December 4, 1964 (Saros 122)	November 3, 1975 (Saros 123)	October 3, 1986 (Saros 124)	September 2, 1997 (Saros 125)	August 1, 2008 (Saros 126)
July 2, 2019 (Saros 127)	June 1, 2030 (Saros 128)	April 30, 2041 (Saros 129)	March 30, 2052 (Saros 130)	February 28, 2063 (Saros 131)
January 27, 2074 (Saros 132)	December 27, 2084 (Saros 133)	November 27, 2095 (Saros 134)	October 26, 2106 (Saros 135)	September 26, 2117 (Saros 136)
August 25, 2128 (Saros 137)	July 25, 2139 (Saros 138)	June 25, 2150 (Saros 139)	May 25, 2161 (Saros 140)	April 23, 2172 (Saros 141)
March 23, 2183 (Saros 142)	February 21, 2194 (Saros 143)			

=== Inex series ===
This eclipse is a part of the long period inex cycle, repeating at alternating nodes, every 358 synodic months (≈ 10,571.95 days, or 29 years minus 20 days). Their appearance and longitude are irregular due to a lack of synchronization with the anomalistic month (period of perigee). However, groupings of 3 inex cycles (≈ 87 years minus 2 months) comes close (≈ 1,151.02 anomalistic months), so eclipses are similar in these groupings.

Series members between 1801 and 2200
July 8, 1823 (Saros 114)	June 17, 1852 (Saros 115)	May 27, 1881 (Saros 116)
May 9, 1910 (Saros 117)	April 19, 1939 (Saros 118)	March 28, 1968 (Saros 119)
March 9, 1997 (Saros 120)	February 17, 2026 (Saros 121)	January 27, 2055 (Saros 122)
January 7, 2084 (Saros 123)	December 19, 2112 (Saros 124)	November 28, 2141 (Saros 125)
November 8, 2170 (Saros 126)	October 19, 2199 (Saros 127)	
