= Solar eclipse of June 10, 1964 =

20th-century partial solar eclipse

- Partial eclipse
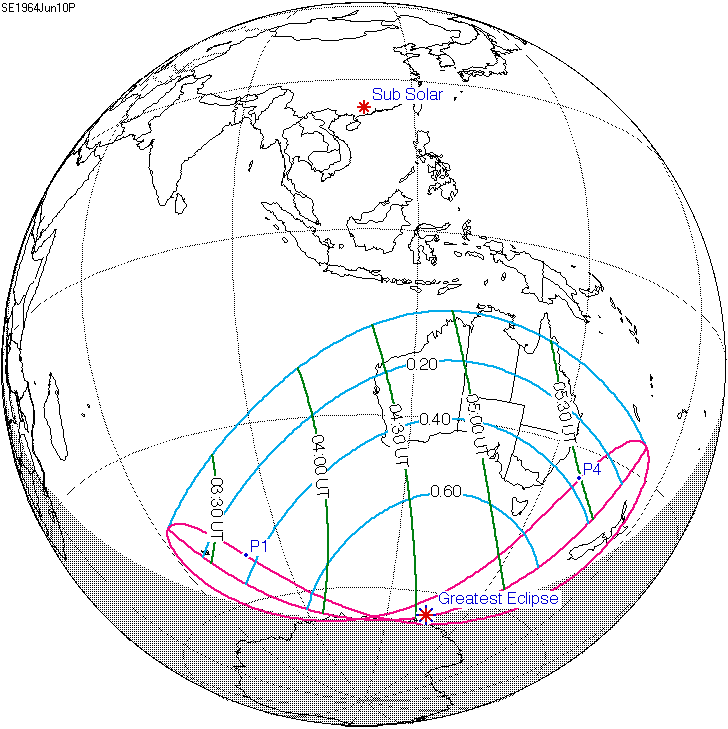
- Map
- Gamma: −1.1393
- Magnitude: 0.7545

Maximum eclipse
- Coordinates: 65°S 135.9°E

Times (UTC)
- Greatest eclipse: 4:34:07

References
- Saros: 117 (66 of 71)
- Catalog # (SE5000): 9430

A partial solar eclipse occurred at the Moon's ascending node of orbit on Wednesday, June 10, 1964, with a magnitude of 0.7545. A solar eclipse occurs when the Moon passes between Earth and the Sun, thereby totally or partly obscuring the image of the Sun for a viewer on Earth. A partial solar eclipse occurs in the polar regions of the Earth when the center of the Moon's shadow misses the Earth.

This was the second of four partial solar eclipses in 1964, with the others occurring on January 14, July 9, and December 4.

A partial eclipse was visible for parts of Australia and western Oceania.

== Eclipse details ==
Shown below are two tables displaying details about this particular solar eclipse. The first table outlines times at which the Moon's penumbra or umbra attains the specific parameter, and the second table describes various other parameters pertaining to this eclipse.

June 10, 1964 Solar Eclipse Times
Event	Time (UTC)
First Penumbral External Contact	1964 June 10 at 02:49:28.6 UTC
Equatorial Conjunction	1964 June 10 at 04:13:17.5 UTC
Ecliptic Conjunction	1964 June 10 at 04:22:52.0 UTC
Greatest Eclipse	1964 June 10 at 04:34:07.0 UTC
Last Penumbral External Contact	1964 June 10 at 06:18:54.5 UTC

June 10, 1964 Solar Eclipse Parameters
Parameter	Value
Eclipse Magnitude	0.75455
Eclipse Obscuration	0.70285
Gamma	−1.13926
Sun Right Ascension	05h13m32.2s
Sun Declination	+23°00'50.0"
Sun Semi-Diameter	15'45.1"
Sun Equatorial Horizontal Parallax	08.7"
Moon Right Ascension	05h14m24.9s
Moon Declination	+21°52'09.4"
Moon Semi-Diameter	16'43.2"
Moon Equatorial Horizontal Parallax	1°01'21.8"
ΔT	35.3 s

== Eclipse season ==
This eclipse is part of an eclipse season, a period, roughly every six months, when eclipses occur. Only two (or occasionally three) eclipse seasons occur each year, and each season lasts about 35 days and repeats just short of six months (173 days) later; thus two full eclipse seasons always occur each year. Either two or three eclipses happen each eclipse season. In the sequence below, each eclipse is separated by a fortnight. The first and last eclipse in this sequence is separated by one synodic month.

Eclipse season of June–July 1964
June 10 Ascending node (new moon)	June 25 Descending node (full moon)	July 9 Ascending node (new moon)
Partial solar eclipse Solar Saros 117	Total lunar eclipse Lunar Saros 129	Partial solar eclipse Solar Saros 155

== Related eclipses ==
=== Eclipses in 1964 ===
- A partial solar eclipse on January 14.
- A partial solar eclipse on June 10.
- A total lunar eclipse on June 25.
- A partial solar eclipse on July 9.
- A partial solar eclipse on December 4.
- A total lunar eclipse on December 19.

=== Metonic ===
- Followed by: Solar eclipse of March 28, 1968

=== Tzolkinex ===
- Preceded by: Solar eclipse of April 30, 1957
- Followed by: Solar eclipse of July 22, 1971

=== Half-Saros ===
- Preceded by: Lunar eclipse of June 5, 1955
- Followed by: Lunar eclipse of June 15, 1973

=== Tritos ===
- Preceded by: Solar eclipse of July 11, 1953
- Followed by: Solar eclipse of May 11, 1975

=== Solar Saros 117 ===
- Preceded by: Solar eclipse of May 30, 1946
- Followed by: Solar eclipse of June 21, 1982

=== Inex ===
- Preceded by: Solar eclipse of June 30, 1935
- Followed by: Solar eclipse of May 21, 1993

=== Triad ===
- Preceded by: Solar eclipse of August 9, 1877
- Followed by: Solar eclipse of April 11, 2051

=== Solar eclipses of 1964–1967 ===
This eclipse is a member of a semester series. An eclipse in a semester series of solar eclipses repeats approximately every 177 days and 4 hours (a semester) at alternating nodes of the Moon's orbit.

The partial solar eclipses on January 14, 1964 and July 9, 1964 occur in the previous lunar year eclipse set.

Solar eclipse series sets from 1964 to 1967
Ascending node			Descending node		
Saros	Map	Gamma	Saros	Map	Gamma
117	June 10, 1964 Partial	−1.1393	122	December 4, 1964 Partial	1.1193
127	May 30, 1965 Total	−0.4225	132	November 23, 1965 Annular	0.3906
137	May 20, 1966 Annular	0.3467	142	November 12, 1966 Total	−0.33
147	May 9, 1967 Partial	1.1422	152	November 2, 1967 Total (non-central)	1.0007

=== Saros 117 ===
This eclipse is a part of Saros series 117, repeating every 18 years, 11 days, and containing 71 events. The series started with a partial solar eclipse on June 24, 792 AD. It contains annular eclipses from September 18, 936 AD through May 14, 1333; hybrid eclipses from May 25, 1351 through July 8, 1423; and total eclipses from July 18, 1441 through May 19, 1928. The series ends at member 71 as a partial eclipse on August 3, 2054. Its eclipses are tabulated in three columns; every third eclipse in the same column is one exeligmos apart, so they all cast shadows over approximately the same parts of the Earth.

The longest duration of annularity was produced by member 16 at 9 minutes, 26 seconds on December 3, 1062, and the longest duration of totality was produced by member 62 at 4 minutes, 19 seconds on April 26, 1892. All eclipses in this series occur at the Moon’s ascending node of orbit.

Series members 57–71 occur between 1801 and 2054:
57	58	59
March 4, 1802	March 14, 1820	March 25, 1838
60	61	62
April 5, 1856	April 16, 1874	April 26, 1892
63	64	65
May 9, 1910	May 19, 1928	May 30, 1946
66	67	68
June 10, 1964	June 21, 1982	July 1, 2000
69	70	71
July 13, 2018	July 23, 2036	August 3, 2054

=== Metonic series ===
The metonic series repeats eclipses every 19 years (6939.69 days), lasting about 5 cycles. Eclipses occur in nearly the same calendar date. In addition, the octon subseries repeats 1/5 of that or every 3.8 years (1387.94 days). All eclipses in this table occur at the Moon's ascending node.

20 eclipse events between June 10, 1964 and August 21, 2036
June 10–11	March 28–29	January 14–16	November 3	August 21–22
117	119	121	123	125
June 10, 1964	March 28, 1968	January 16, 1972	November 3, 1975	August 22, 1979
127	129	131	133	135
June 11, 1983	March 29, 1987	January 15, 1991	November 3, 1994	August 22, 1998
137	139	141	143	145
June 10, 2002	March 29, 2006	January 15, 2010	November 3, 2013	August 21, 2017
147	149	151	153	155
June 10, 2021	March 29, 2025	January 14, 2029	November 3, 2032	August 21, 2036

=== Tritos series ===
This eclipse is a part of a tritos cycle, repeating at alternating nodes every 135 synodic months (≈ 3986.63 days, or 11 years minus 1 month). Their appearance and longitude are irregular due to a lack of synchronization with the anomalistic month (period of perigee), but groupings of 3 tritos cycles (≈ 33 years minus 3 months) come close (≈ 434.044 anomalistic months), so eclipses are similar in these groupings.

Series members between 1866 and 2200
March 16, 1866 (Saros 108)			December 13, 1898 (Saros 111)	
	September 12, 1931 (Saros 114)	August 12, 1942 (Saros 115)	July 11, 1953 (Saros 116)	June 10, 1964 (Saros 117)
May 11, 1975 (Saros 118)	April 9, 1986 (Saros 119)	March 9, 1997 (Saros 120)	February 7, 2008 (Saros 121)	January 6, 2019 (Saros 122)
December 5, 2029 (Saros 123)	November 4, 2040 (Saros 124)	October 4, 2051 (Saros 125)	September 3, 2062 (Saros 126)	August 3, 2073 (Saros 127)
July 3, 2084 (Saros 128)	June 2, 2095 (Saros 129)	May 3, 2106 (Saros 130)	April 2, 2117 (Saros 131)	March 1, 2128 (Saros 132)
January 30, 2139 (Saros 133)	December 30, 2149 (Saros 134)	November 27, 2160 (Saros 135)	October 29, 2171 (Saros 136)	September 27, 2182 (Saros 137)
August 26, 2193 (Saros 138)

=== Inex series ===
This eclipse is a part of the long period inex cycle, repeating at alternating nodes, every 358 synodic months (≈ 10,571.95 days, or 29 years minus 20 days). Their appearance and longitude are irregular due to a lack of synchronization with the anomalistic month (period of perigee). However, groupings of 3 inex cycles (≈ 87 years minus 2 months) comes close (≈ 1,151.02 anomalistic months), so eclipses are similar in these groupings.

Series members between 1801 and 2200
September 19, 1819 (Saros 112)	August 28, 1848 (Saros 113)	August 9, 1877 (Saros 114)
July 21, 1906 (Saros 115)	June 30, 1935 (Saros 116)	June 10, 1964 (Saros 117)
May 21, 1993 (Saros 118)	April 30, 2022 (Saros 119)	April 11, 2051 (Saros 120)
March 21, 2080 (Saros 121)	March 1, 2109 (Saros 122)	February 9, 2138 (Saros 123)
January 21, 2167 (Saros 124)	December 31, 2195 (Saros 125)	
