= Solar eclipse of December 4, 1964 =

20th-century partial solar eclipse

- Partial eclipse
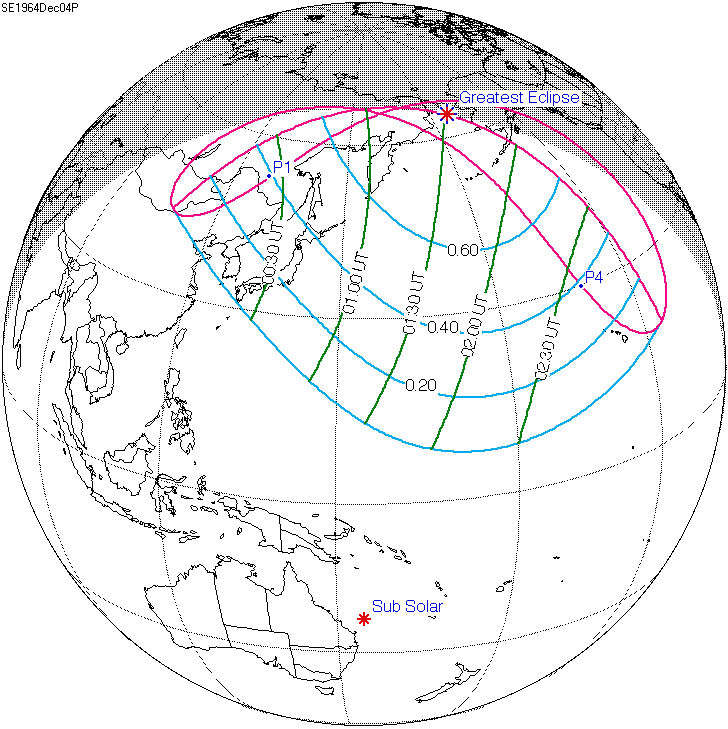
- Map
- Gamma: 1.1193
- Magnitude: 0.7518

Maximum eclipse
- Coordinates: 64.3°N 173.3°W

Times (UTC)
- Greatest eclipse: 1:31:54

References
- Saros: 122 (55 of 70)
- Catalog # (SE5000): 9431

A partial solar eclipse occurred at the Moon's descending node of orbit between Thursday, December 3 and Friday, December 4, 1964, with a magnitude of 0.7518. A solar eclipse occurs when the Moon passes between Earth and the Sun, thereby totally or partly obscuring the image of the Sun for a viewer on Earth. A partial solar eclipse occurs in the polar regions of the Earth when the center of the Moon's shadow misses the Earth.

This was the last of four partial solar eclipses in 1964, with the others occurring on January 14, June 10, and July 9.

A partial eclipse was visible for parts of Northeast Asia, southwest Alaska, and Hawaii.

== Eclipse details ==
Shown below are two tables displaying details about this particular solar eclipse. The first table outlines times at which the Moon's penumbra or umbra attains the specific parameter, and the second table describes various other parameters pertaining to this eclipse.

December 4, 1964 Solar Eclipse Times
Event	Time (UTC)
First Penumbral External Contact	1964 December 3 at 23:21:15.6 UTC
Equatorial Conjunction	1964 December 4 at 01:00:31.0 UTC
Ecliptic Conjunction	1964 December 4 at 01:18:47.3 UTC
Greatest Eclipse	1964 December 4 at 01:31:54.2 UTC
Last Penumbral External Contact	1964 December 4 at 03:42:48.7 UTC

December 4, 1964 Solar Eclipse Parameters
Parameter	Value
Eclipse Magnitude	0.75179
Eclipse Obscuration	0.66267
Gamma	1.11929
Sun Right Ascension	16h41m43.6s
Sun Declination	-22°13'30.4"
Sun Semi-Diameter	16'13.7"
Sun Equatorial Horizontal Parallax	08.9"
Moon Right Ascension	16h42m43.4s
Moon Declination	-21°14'34.6"
Moon Semi-Diameter	14'46.7"
Moon Equatorial Horizontal Parallax	0°54'14.3"
ΔT	35.7 s

== Eclipse season ==
This eclipse is part of an eclipse season, a period, roughly every six months, when eclipses occur. Only two (or occasionally three) eclipse seasons occur each year, and each season lasts about 35 days and repeats just short of six months (173 days) later; thus two full eclipse seasons always occur each year. Either two or three eclipses happen each eclipse season. In the sequence below, each eclipse is separated by a fortnight.

Eclipse season of December 1964
December 4 Descending node (new moon)	December 19 Ascending node (full moon)
Partial solar eclipse Solar Saros 122	Total lunar eclipse Lunar Saros 134

== Related eclipses ==
=== Eclipses in 1964 ===
- A partial solar eclipse on January 14.
- A partial solar eclipse on June 10.
- A total lunar eclipse on June 25.
- A partial solar eclipse on July 9.
- A partial solar eclipse on December 4.
- A total lunar eclipse on December 19.

=== Metonic ===
- Preceded by: Solar eclipse of February 15, 1961
- Followed by: Solar eclipse of September 22, 1968

=== Tzolkinex ===
- Preceded by: Solar eclipse of October 23, 1957
- Followed by: Solar eclipse of January 16, 1972

=== Half-Saros ===
- Preceded by: Lunar eclipse of November 29, 1955
- Followed by: Lunar eclipse of December 10, 1973

=== Tritos ===
- Preceded by: Solar eclipse of January 5, 1954
- Followed by: Solar eclipse of November 3, 1975

=== Solar Saros 122 ===
- Preceded by: Solar eclipse of November 23, 1946
- Followed by: Solar eclipse of December 15, 1982

=== Inex ===
- Preceded by: Solar eclipse of December 25, 1935
- Followed by: Solar eclipse of November 13, 1993

=== Triad ===
- Preceded by: Solar eclipse of February 2, 1878
- Followed by: Solar eclipse of October 4, 2051

=== Solar eclipses of 1964–1967 ===
This eclipse is a member of a semester series. An eclipse in a semester series of solar eclipses repeats approximately every 177 days and 4 hours (a semester) at alternating nodes of the Moon's orbit.

The partial solar eclipses on January 14, 1964 and July 9, 1964 occur in the previous lunar year eclipse set.

Solar eclipse series sets from 1964 to 1967
Ascending node			Descending node		
Saros	Map	Gamma	Saros	Map	Gamma
117	June 10, 1964 Partial	−1.1393	122	December 4, 1964 Partial	1.1193
127	May 30, 1965 Total	−0.4225	132	November 23, 1965 Annular	0.3906
137	May 20, 1966 Annular	0.3467	142	November 12, 1966 Total	−0.33
147	May 9, 1967 Partial	1.1422	152	November 2, 1967 Total (non-central)	1.0007

=== Saros 122 ===
This eclipse is a part of Saros series 122, repeating every 18 years, 11 days, and containing 70 events. The series started with a partial solar eclipse on April 17, 991 AD. It contains total eclipses from July 12, 1135 through August 3, 1171; hybrid eclipses on August 13, 1189 and August 25, 1207; and annular eclipses from September 4, 1225 through October 10, 1874. The series ends at member 70 as a partial eclipse on May 17, 2235. Its eclipses are tabulated in three columns; every third eclipse in the same column is one exeligmos apart, so they all cast shadows over approximately the same parts of the Earth.

The longest duration of totality was produced by member 9 at 1 minutes, 25 seconds on July 12, 1135, and the longest duration of annularity was produced by member 50 at 6 minutes, 28 seconds on October 10, 1874. All eclipses in this series occur at the Moon’s descending node of orbit.

Series members 46–68 occur between 1801 and 2200:
46	47	48
August 28, 1802	September 7, 1820	September 18, 1838
49	50	51
September 29, 1856	October 10, 1874	October 20, 1892
52	53	54
November 2, 1910	November 12, 1928	November 23, 1946
55	56	57
December 4, 1964	December 15, 1982	December 25, 2000
58	59	60
January 6, 2019	January 16, 2037	January 27, 2055
61	62	63
February 7, 2073	February 18, 2091	March 1, 2109
64	65	66
March 13, 2127	March 23, 2145	April 3, 2163
67	68	
April 14, 2181	April 25, 2199	

=== Metonic series ===
The metonic series repeats eclipses every 19 years (6939.69 days), lasting about 5 cycles. Eclipses occur in nearly the same calendar date. In addition, the octon subseries repeats 1/5 of that or every 3.8 years (1387.94 days). All eclipses in this table occur at the Moon's descending node.

21 eclipse events between July 11, 1953 and July 11, 2029
July 10–11	April 29–30	February 15–16	December 4	September 21–23
116	118	120	122	124
July 11, 1953	April 30, 1957	February 15, 1961	December 4, 1964	September 22, 1968
126	128	130	132	134
July 10, 1972	April 29, 1976	February 16, 1980	December 4, 1983	September 23, 1987
136	138	140	142	144
July 11, 1991	April 29, 1995	February 16, 1999	December 4, 2002	September 22, 2006
146	148	150	152	154
July 11, 2010	April 29, 2014	February 15, 2018	December 4, 2021	September 21, 2025
156
July 11, 2029

=== Tritos series ===
This eclipse is a part of a tritos cycle, repeating at alternating nodes every 135 synodic months (≈ 3986.63 days, or 11 years minus 1 month). Their appearance and longitude are irregular due to a lack of synchronization with the anomalistic month (period of perigee), but groupings of 3 tritos cycles (≈ 33 years minus 3 months) come close (≈ 434.044 anomalistic months), so eclipses are similar in these groupings.

Series members between 1801 and 2200
March 14, 1801 (Saros 107)	February 12, 1812 (Saros 108)	January 12, 1823 (Saros 109)		November 10, 1844 (Saros 111)
		August 9, 1877 (Saros 114)	July 9, 1888 (Saros 115)	June 8, 1899 (Saros 116)
May 9, 1910 (Saros 117)	April 8, 1921 (Saros 118)	March 7, 1932 (Saros 119)	February 4, 1943 (Saros 120)	January 5, 1954 (Saros 121)
December 4, 1964 (Saros 122)	November 3, 1975 (Saros 123)	October 3, 1986 (Saros 124)	September 2, 1997 (Saros 125)	August 1, 2008 (Saros 126)
July 2, 2019 (Saros 127)	June 1, 2030 (Saros 128)	April 30, 2041 (Saros 129)	March 30, 2052 (Saros 130)	February 28, 2063 (Saros 131)
January 27, 2074 (Saros 132)	December 27, 2084 (Saros 133)	November 27, 2095 (Saros 134)	October 26, 2106 (Saros 135)	September 26, 2117 (Saros 136)
August 25, 2128 (Saros 137)	July 25, 2139 (Saros 138)	June 25, 2150 (Saros 139)	May 25, 2161 (Saros 140)	April 23, 2172 (Saros 141)
March 23, 2183 (Saros 142)	February 21, 2194 (Saros 143)			

=== Inex series ===
This eclipse is a part of the long period inex cycle, repeating at alternating nodes, every 358 synodic months (≈ 10,571.95 days, or 29 years minus 20 days). Their appearance and longitude are irregular due to a lack of synchronization with the anomalistic month (period of perigee). However, groupings of 3 inex cycles (≈ 87 years minus 2 months) comes close (≈ 1,151.02 anomalistic months), so eclipses are similar in these groupings.

Series members between 1801 and 2200
March 14, 1820 (Saros 117)	February 23, 1849 (Saros 118)	February 2, 1878 (Saros 119)
January 14, 1907 (Saros 120)	December 25, 1935 (Saros 121)	December 4, 1964 (Saros 122)
November 13, 1993 (Saros 123)	October 25, 2022 (Saros 124)	October 4, 2051 (Saros 125)
September 13, 2080 (Saros 126)	August 26, 2109 (Saros 127)	August 5, 2138 (Saros 128)
July 16, 2167 (Saros 129)	June 26, 2196 (Saros 130)	
