= Solar eclipse of June 30, 1935 =

20th-century partial solar eclipse

- Partial eclipse
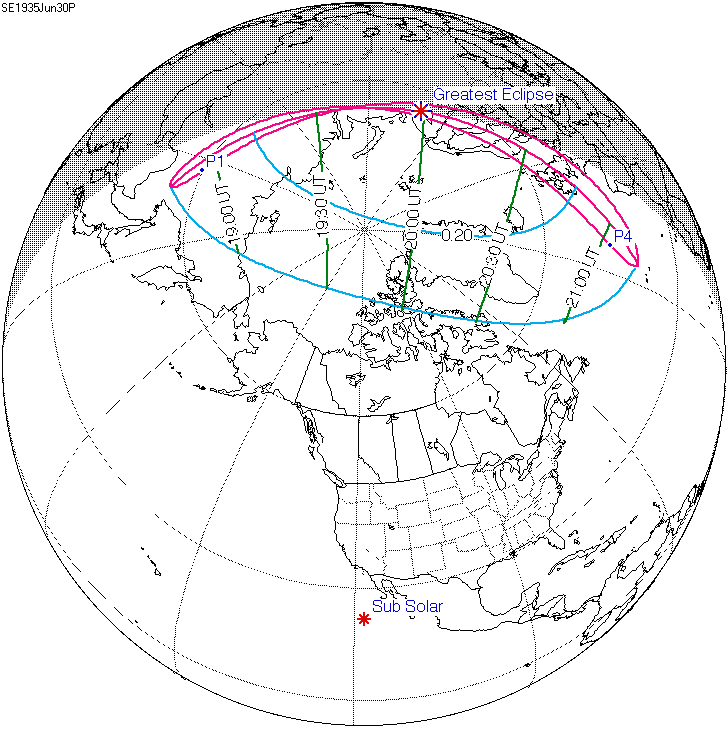
- Map
- Gamma: 1.3623
- Magnitude: 0.3375

Maximum eclipse
- Coordinates: 65.2°N 39.1°E

Times (UTC)
- Greatest eclipse: 19:59:46

References
- Saros: 116 (68 of 70)
- Catalog # (SE5000): 9365

A partial solar eclipse occurred at the Moon's descending node of orbit on Sunday, June 30, 1935, with a magnitude of 0.3375. A solar eclipse occurs when the Moon passes between Earth and the Sun, thereby totally or partly obscuring the image of the Sun for a viewer on Earth. A partial solar eclipse occurs in the polar regions of the Earth when the center of the Moon's shadow misses the Earth.

This was the third of five solar eclipses in 1935, with the others occurring on January 5, February 3, July 30, and December 25. The next time this will occur is 2206.

A partial eclipse was visible for parts of Northern Europe, the northern Soviet Union, and Greenland.

== Eclipse details ==
Shown below are two tables displaying details about this particular solar eclipse. The first table outlines times at which the Moon's penumbra or umbra attains the specific parameter, and the second table describes various other parameters pertaining to this eclipse.

June 30, 1935 Solar Eclipse Times
Event	Time (UTC)
First Penumbral External Contact	1935 June 30 at 18:34:28.3 UTC
Equatorial Conjunction	1935 June 30 at 19:35:14.1 UTC
Ecliptic Conjunction	1935 June 30 at 19:44:50.9 UTC
Greatest Eclipse	1935 June 30 at 19:59:46.1 UTC
Last Penumbral External Contact	1935 June 30 at 21:25:19.1 UTC

June 30, 1935 Solar Eclipse Parameters
Parameter	Value
Eclipse Magnitude	0.33754
Eclipse Obscuration	0.22087
Gamma	1.36229
Sun Right Ascension	06h35m11.8s
Sun Declination	+23°12'07.1"
Sun Semi-Diameter	15'43.8"
Sun Equatorial Horizontal Parallax	08.6"
Moon Right Ascension	06h36m03.6s
Moon Declination	+24°26'55.7"
Moon Semi-Diameter	15'11.3"
Moon Equatorial Horizontal Parallax	0°55'44.6"
ΔT	23.8 s

== Eclipse season ==
This eclipse is part of an eclipse season, a period, roughly every six months, when eclipses occur. Only two (or occasionally three) eclipse seasons occur each year, and each season lasts about 35 days and repeats just short of six months (173 days) later; thus two full eclipse seasons always occur each year. Either two or three eclipses happen each eclipse season. In the sequence below, each eclipse is separated by a fortnight. The first and last eclipse in this sequence is separated by one synodic month.

Eclipse season of June–July 1935
June 30 Descending node (new moon)	July 16 Ascending node (full moon)	July 30 Descending node (new moon)
Partial solar eclipse Solar Saros 116	Total lunar eclipse Lunar Saros 128	Partial solar eclipse Solar Saros 154

== Related eclipses ==
=== Eclipses in 1935 ===
- A partial solar eclipse on January 5.
- A total lunar eclipse on January 19.
- A partial solar eclipse on February 3.
- A partial solar eclipse on June 30.
- A total lunar eclipse on July 16.
- A partial solar eclipse on July 30.
- An annular solar eclipse on December 25.

=== Metonic ===
- Preceded by: Solar eclipse of September 12, 1931
- Followed by: Solar eclipse of April 19, 1939

=== Tzolkinex ===
- Preceded by: Solar eclipse of May 19, 1928
- Followed by: Solar eclipse of August 12, 1942

=== Half-Saros ===
- Preceded by: Lunar eclipse of June 25, 1926
- Followed by: Lunar eclipse of July 6, 1944

=== Tritos ===
- Preceded by: Solar eclipse of July 31, 1924
- Followed by: Solar eclipse of May 30, 1946

=== Solar Saros 116 ===
- Preceded by: Solar eclipse of June 19, 1917
- Followed by: Solar eclipse of July 11, 1953

=== Inex ===
- Preceded by: Solar eclipse of July 21, 1906
- Followed by: Solar eclipse of June 10, 1964

=== Triad ===
- Preceded by: Solar eclipse of August 28, 1848
- Followed by: Solar eclipse of April 30, 2022

=== Solar eclipses of 1935–1938 ===
This eclipse is a member of a semester series. An eclipse in a semester series of solar eclipses repeats approximately every 177 days and 4 hours (a semester) at alternating nodes of the Moon's orbit.

The partial solar eclipses on February 3, 1935 and July 30, 1935 occur in the previous lunar year eclipse set.

Solar eclipse series sets from 1935 to 1938
Ascending node			Descending node		
Saros	Map	Gamma	Saros	Map	Gamma
111	January 5, 1935 Partial	−1.5381	116	June 30, 1935 Partial	1.3623
121	December 25, 1935 Annular	−0.9228	126	June 19, 1936 Total	0.5389
131	December 13, 1936 Annular	−0.2493	136 Totality in Kanton Island, Kiribati	June 8, 1937 Total	−0.2253
141	December 2, 1937 Annular	0.4389	146	May 29, 1938 Total	−0.9607
151	November 21, 1938 Partial	1.1077			

=== Saros 116 ===
This eclipse is a part of Saros series 116, repeating every 18 years, 11 days, and containing 70 events. The series started with a partial solar eclipse on June 23, 727 AD. It contains annular eclipses from October 10, 907 AD through May 6, 1845. There are no hybrid or total eclipses in this set. The series ends at member 70 as a partial eclipse on July 22, 1971. Its eclipses are tabulated in three columns; every third eclipse in the same column is one exeligmos apart, so they all cast shadows over approximately the same parts of the Earth.

The longest duration of annularity was produced by member 51 at 12 minutes, 2 seconds on December 25, 1628. All eclipses in this series occur at the Moon’s descending node of orbit.

Series members 61–70 occur between 1801 and 1971:
61	62	63
April 14, 1809	April 26, 1827	May 6, 1845
64	65	66
May 17, 1863	May 27, 1881	June 8, 1899
67	68	69
June 19, 1917	June 30, 1935	July 11, 1953
70
July 22, 1971

=== Metonic series ===
The metonic series repeats eclipses every 19 years (6939.69 days), lasting about 5 cycles. Eclipses occur in nearly the same calendar date. In addition, the octon subseries repeats 1/5 of that or every 3.8 years (1387.94 days). All eclipses in this table occur at the Moon's descending node.

22 eclipse events between September 12, 1931 and July 1, 2011
September 11–12	June 30–July 1	April 17–19	February 4–5	November 22–23
114	116	118	120	122
September 12, 1931	June 30, 1935	April 19, 1939	February 4, 1943	November 23, 1946
124	126	128	130	132
September 12, 1950	June 30, 1954	April 19, 1958	February 5, 1962	November 23, 1965
134	136	138	140	142
September 11, 1969	June 30, 1973	April 18, 1977	February 4, 1981	November 22, 1984
144	146	148	150	152
September 11, 1988	June 30, 1992	April 17, 1996	February 5, 2000	November 23, 2003
154	156			
September 11, 2007	July 1, 2011			

=== Tritos series ===
This eclipse is a part of a tritos cycle, repeating at alternating nodes every 135 synodic months (≈ 3986.63 days, or 11 years minus 1 month). Their appearance and longitude are irregular due to a lack of synchronization with the anomalistic month (period of perigee), but groupings of 3 tritos cycles (≈ 33 years minus 3 months) come close (≈ 434.044 anomalistic months), so eclipses are similar in these groupings.

Series members between 1837 and 2200
April 5, 1837 (Saros 107)	March 5, 1848 (Saros 108)	February 3, 1859 (Saros 109)		December 2, 1880 (Saros 111)
		August 31, 1913 (Saros 114)	July 31, 1924 (Saros 115)	June 30, 1935 (Saros 116)
May 30, 1946 (Saros 117)	April 30, 1957 (Saros 118)	March 28, 1968 (Saros 119)	February 26, 1979 (Saros 120)	January 26, 1990 (Saros 121)
December 25, 2000 (Saros 122)	November 25, 2011 (Saros 123)	October 25, 2022 (Saros 124)	September 23, 2033 (Saros 125)	August 23, 2044 (Saros 126)
July 24, 2055 (Saros 127)	June 22, 2066 (Saros 128)	May 22, 2077 (Saros 129)	April 21, 2088 (Saros 130)	March 21, 2099 (Saros 131)
February 18, 2110 (Saros 132)	January 19, 2121 (Saros 133)	December 19, 2131 (Saros 134)	November 17, 2142 (Saros 135)	October 17, 2153 (Saros 136)
September 16, 2164 (Saros 137)	August 16, 2175 (Saros 138)	July 16, 2186 (Saros 139)	June 15, 2197 (Saros 140)	

=== Inex series ===
This eclipse is a part of the long period inex cycle, repeating at alternating nodes, every 358 synodic months (≈ 10,571.95 days, or 29 years minus 20 days). Their appearance and longitude are irregular due to a lack of synchronization with the anomalistic month (period of perigee). However, groupings of 3 inex cycles (≈ 87 years minus 2 months) comes close (≈ 1,151.02 anomalistic months), so eclipses are similar in these groupings.

Series members between 1801 and 2200
September 19, 1819 (Saros 112)	August 28, 1848 (Saros 113)	August 9, 1877 (Saros 114)
July 21, 1906 (Saros 115)	June 30, 1935 (Saros 116)	June 10, 1964 (Saros 117)
May 21, 1993 (Saros 118)	April 30, 2022 (Saros 119)	April 11, 2051 (Saros 120)
March 21, 2080 (Saros 121)	March 1, 2109 (Saros 122)	February 9, 2138 (Saros 123)
January 21, 2167 (Saros 124)	December 31, 2195 (Saros 125)	
