= Solar eclipse of July 11, 1953 =

20th-century partial solar eclipse

- Partial eclipse
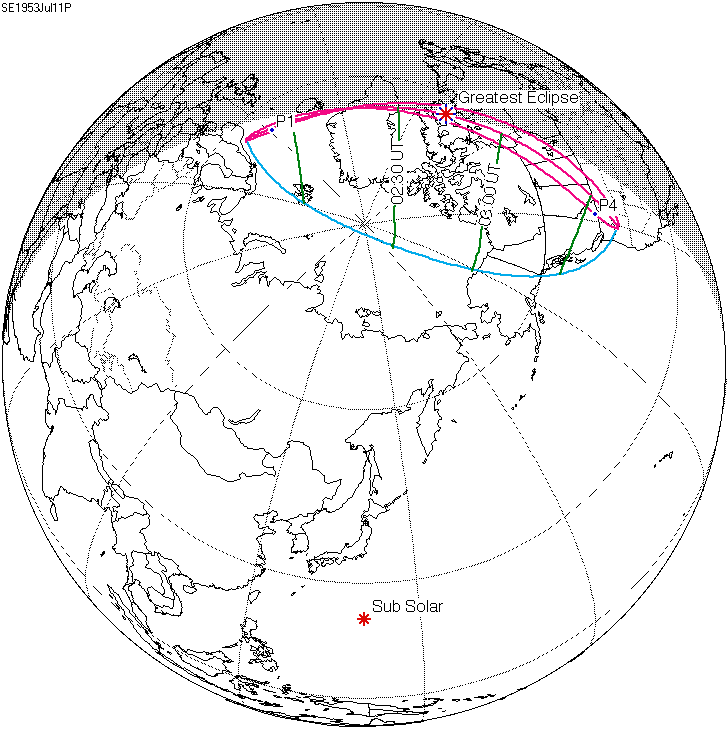
- Map
- Gamma: 1.4388
- Magnitude: 0.2015

Maximum eclipse
- Coordinates: 64.3°N 71.7°W

Times (UTC)
- Greatest eclipse: 2:44:14

References
- Saros: 116 (69 of 70)
- Catalog # (SE5000): 9406

A partial solar eclipse occurred at the Moon's descending node of orbit on Saturday, July 11, 1953, with a magnitude of 0.2015. A solar eclipse occurs when the Moon passes between Earth and the Sun, thereby totally or partly obscuring the image of the Sun for a viewer on Earth. A partial solar eclipse occurs in the polar regions of the Earth when the center of the Moon's shadow misses the Earth.

A partial eclipse was visible for parts of Canada, Greenland, and the Pacific Northwest.

== Eclipse details ==
Shown below are two tables displaying details about this particular solar eclipse. The first table outlines times at which the Moon's penumbra or umbra attains the specific parameter, and the second table describes various other parameters pertaining to this eclipse.

July 11, 1953 Solar Eclipse Times
Event	Time (UTC)
First Penumbral External Contact	1953 July 11 at 01:37:53.9 UTC
Equatorial Conjunction	1953 July 11 at 02:05:36.4 UTC
Ecliptic Conjunction	1953 July 11 at 02:28:37.4 UTC
Greatest Eclipse	1953 July 11 at 02:44:14.2 UTC
Last Penumbral External Contact	1953 July 11 at 03:50:55.3 UTC

July 11, 1953 Solar Eclipse Parameters
Parameter	Value
Eclipse Magnitude	0.20149
Eclipse Obscuration	0.10431
Gamma	1.43882
Sun Right Ascension	07h20m09.8s
Sun Declination	+22°10'04.8"
Sun Semi-Diameter	15'43.9"
Sun Equatorial Horizontal Parallax	08.7"
Moon Right Ascension	07h21m30.2s
Moon Declination	+23°28'09.7"
Moon Semi-Diameter	15'14.1"
Moon Equatorial Horizontal Parallax	0°55'54.9"
ΔT	30.5 s

== Eclipse season ==
This eclipse is part of an eclipse season, a period, roughly every six months, when eclipses occur. Only two (or occasionally three) eclipse seasons occur each year, and each season lasts about 35 days and repeats just short of six months (173 days) later; thus two full eclipse seasons always occur each year. Either two or three eclipses happen each eclipse season. In the sequence below, each eclipse is separated by a fortnight.

Eclipse season of July–August 1953
July 11 Descending node (new moon)	July 26 Ascending node (full moon)	August 9 Descending node (new moon)
Partial solar eclipse Solar Saros 116	Total lunar eclipse Lunar Saros 128	Partial solar eclipse Solar Saros 154

== Related eclipses ==
=== Eclipses in 1953 ===
- A total lunar eclipse on January 29.
- A partial solar eclipse on February 14.
- A partial solar eclipse on July 11.
- A total lunar eclipse on July 26.
- A partial solar eclipse on August 9.

=== Metonic ===
- Followed by: Solar eclipse of April 30, 1957

=== Tzolkinex ===
- Preceded by: Solar eclipse of May 30, 1946

=== Half-Saros ===
- Preceded by: Lunar eclipse of July 6, 1944
- Followed by: Lunar eclipse of July 17, 1962

=== Tritos ===
- Preceded by: Solar eclipse of August 12, 1942
- Followed by: Solar eclipse of June 10, 1964

=== Solar Saros 116 ===
- Preceded by: Solar eclipse of June 30, 1935
- Followed by: Solar eclipse of July 22, 1971

=== Inex ===
- Preceded by: Solar eclipse of July 31, 1924
- Followed by: Solar eclipse of June 21, 1982

=== Triad ===
- Followed by: Solar eclipse of May 11, 2040

=== Solar eclipses of 1953–1956 ===
This eclipse is a member of a semester series. An eclipse in a semester series of solar eclipses repeats approximately every 177 days and 4 hours (a semester) at alternating nodes of the Moon's orbit.

The partial solar eclipses on February 14, 1953 and August 9, 1953 occur in the previous lunar year eclipse set.

Solar eclipse series sets from 1953 to 1956
Descending node			Ascending node		
Saros	Map	Gamma	Saros	Map	Gamma
116	July 11, 1953 Partial	1.4388	121	January 5, 1954 Annular	−0.9296
126	June 30, 1954 Total	0.6135	131	December 25, 1954 Annular	−0.2576
136	June 20, 1955 Total	−0.1528	141	December 14, 1955 Annular	0.4266
146	June 8, 1956 Total	−0.8934	151	December 2, 1956 Partial	1.0923

=== Saros 116 ===
This eclipse is a part of Saros series 116, repeating every 18 years, 11 days, and containing 70 events. The series started with a partial solar eclipse on June 23, 727 AD. It contains annular eclipses from October 10, 907 AD through May 6, 1845. There are no hybrid or total eclipses in this set. The series ends at member 70 as a partial eclipse on July 22, 1971. Its eclipses are tabulated in three columns; every third eclipse in the same column is one exeligmos apart, so they all cast shadows over approximately the same parts of the Earth.

The longest duration of annularity was produced by member 51 at 12 minutes, 2 seconds on December 25, 1628. All eclipses in this series occur at the Moon’s descending node of orbit.

Series members 61–70 occur between 1801 and 1971:
61	62	63
April 14, 1809	April 26, 1827	May 6, 1845
64	65	66
May 17, 1863	May 27, 1881	June 8, 1899
67	68	69
June 19, 1917	June 30, 1935	July 11, 1953
70
July 22, 1971

=== Tritos series ===
This eclipse is a part of a tritos cycle, repeating at alternating nodes every 135 synodic months (≈ 3986.63 days, or 11 years minus 1 month). Their appearance and longitude are irregular due to a lack of synchronization with the anomalistic month (period of perigee), but groupings of 3 tritos cycles (≈ 33 years minus 3 months) come close (≈ 434.044 anomalistic months), so eclipses are similar in these groupings.

Series members between 1866 and 2200
March 16, 1866 (Saros 108)			December 13, 1898 (Saros 111)	
	September 12, 1931 (Saros 114)	August 12, 1942 (Saros 115)	July 11, 1953 (Saros 116)	June 10, 1964 (Saros 117)
May 11, 1975 (Saros 118)	April 9, 1986 (Saros 119)	March 9, 1997 (Saros 120)	February 7, 2008 (Saros 121)	January 6, 2019 (Saros 122)
December 5, 2029 (Saros 123)	November 4, 2040 (Saros 124)	October 4, 2051 (Saros 125)	September 3, 2062 (Saros 126)	August 3, 2073 (Saros 127)
July 3, 2084 (Saros 128)	June 2, 2095 (Saros 129)	May 3, 2106 (Saros 130)	April 2, 2117 (Saros 131)	March 1, 2128 (Saros 132)
January 30, 2139 (Saros 133)	December 30, 2149 (Saros 134)	November 27, 2160 (Saros 135)	October 29, 2171 (Saros 136)	September 27, 2182 (Saros 137)
August 26, 2193 (Saros 138)

=== Metonic series ===
The metonic series repeats eclipses every 19 years (6939.69 days), lasting about 5 cycles. Eclipses occur in nearly the same calendar date. In addition, the octon subseries repeats 1/5 of that or every 3.8 years (1387.94 days). All eclipses in this table occur at the Moon's descending node.

21 eclipse events between July 11, 1953 and July 11, 2029
July 10–11	April 29–30	February 15–16	December 4	September 21–23
116	118	120	122	124
July 11, 1953	April 30, 1957	February 15, 1961	December 4, 1964	September 22, 1968
126	128	130	132	134
July 10, 1972	April 29, 1976	February 16, 1980	December 4, 1983	September 23, 1987
136	138	140	142	144
July 11, 1991	April 29, 1995	February 16, 1999	December 4, 2002	September 22, 2006
146	148	150	152	154
July 11, 2010	April 29, 2014	February 15, 2018	December 4, 2021	September 21, 2025
156
July 11, 2029

=== Inex series ===
This eclipse is a part of the long period inex cycle, repeating at alternating nodes, every 358 synodic months (≈ 10,571.95 days, or 29 years minus 20 days). Their appearance and longitude are irregular due to a lack of synchronization with the anomalistic month (period of perigee). However, groupings of 3 inex cycles (≈ 87 years minus 2 months) comes close (≈ 1,151.02 anomalistic months), so eclipses are similar in these groupings.

Series members between 1801 and 2200
October 19, 1808 (Saros 111)		
August 20, 1895 (Saros 114)	July 31, 1924 (Saros 115)	July 11, 1953 (Saros 116)
June 21, 1982 (Saros 117)	June 1, 2011 (Saros 118)	May 11, 2040 (Saros 119)
April 21, 2069 (Saros 120)	April 1, 2098 (Saros 121)	March 13, 2127 (Saros 122)
February 21, 2156 (Saros 123)	January 31, 2185 (Saros 124)	
