= Solar eclipse of January 25, 1982 =

20th-century partial solar eclipse

- Partial eclipse
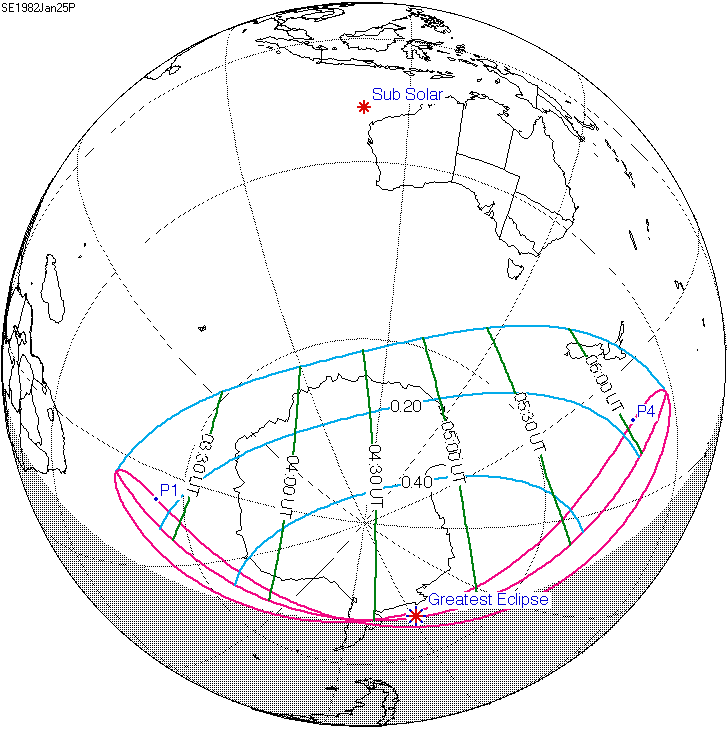
- Map
- Gamma: −1.2311
- Magnitude: 0.5663

Maximum eclipse
- Coordinates: 69.3°S 91.7°W

Times (UTC)
- Greatest eclipse: 4:42:53

References
- Saros: 150 (15 of 71)
- Catalog # (SE5000): 9468

A partial solar eclipse occurred at the Moon's descending node of orbit on Monday, January 25, 1982, with a magnitude of 0.5663. A solar eclipse occurs when the Moon passes between Earth and the Sun, thereby totally or partly obscuring the image of the Sun for a viewer on Earth. A partial solar eclipse occurs in the polar regions of the Earth when the center of the Moon's shadow misses the Earth.

This was the first of four partial solar eclipses in 1982, with the others occurring on June 21, July 20, and December 15.

A partial eclipse was visible for parts of Antarctica and New Zealand.

== Eclipse details ==
Shown below are two tables displaying details about this particular solar eclipse. The first table outlines times at which the Moon's penumbra or umbra attains the specific parameter, and the second table describes various other parameters pertaining to this eclipse.

January 25, 1982 Solar Eclipse Times
Event	Time (UTC)
First Penumbral External Contact	1982 January 25 at 02:50:39.8 UTC
Equatorial Conjunction	1982 January 25 at 04:21:56.3 UTC
Greatest Eclipse	1982 January 25 at 04:42:53.2 UTC
Ecliptic Conjunction	1982 January 25 at 04:56:48.6 UTC
Last Penumbral External Contact	1982 January 25 at 06:35:11.3 UTC

January 25, 1982 Solar Eclipse Parameters
Parameter	Value
Eclipse Magnitude	0.56631
Eclipse Obscuration	0.45424
Gamma	−1.23110
Sun Right Ascension	20h28m55.5s
Sun Declination	-19°02'44.2"
Sun Semi-Diameter	16'14.7"
Sun Equatorial Horizontal Parallax	08.9"
Moon Right Ascension	20h29m37.5s
Moon Declination	-20°09'51.6"
Moon Semi-Diameter	15'03.4"
Moon Equatorial Horizontal Parallax	0°55'15.6"
ΔT	52.2 s

== Eclipse season ==
This eclipse is part of an eclipse season, a period, roughly every six months, when eclipses occur. Only two (or occasionally three) eclipse seasons occur each year, and each season lasts about 35 days and repeats just short of six months (173 days) later; thus two full eclipse seasons always occur each year. Either two or three eclipses happen each eclipse season. In the sequence below, each eclipse is separated by a fortnight.

Eclipse season of January 1982
January 9 Ascending node (full moon)	January 25 Descending node (new moon)
Total lunar eclipse Lunar Saros 124	Partial solar eclipse Solar Saros 150

== Related eclipses ==
=== Eclipses in 1982 ===
- A total lunar eclipse on January 9.
- A partial solar eclipse on January 25.
- A partial solar eclipse on June 21.
- A total lunar eclipse on July 6.
- A partial solar eclipse on July 20.
- A partial solar eclipse on December 15.
- A total lunar eclipse on December 30.

=== Metonic ===
- Preceded by: Solar eclipse of April 7, 1978
- Followed by: Solar eclipse of November 12, 1985

=== Tzolkinex ===
- Preceded by: Solar eclipse of December 13, 1974
- Followed by: Solar eclipse of March 7, 1989

=== Half-Saros ===
- Preceded by: Lunar eclipse of January 18, 1973
- Followed by: Lunar eclipse of January 30, 1991

=== Tritos ===
- Preceded by: Solar eclipse of February 25, 1971
- Followed by: Solar eclipse of December 24, 1992

=== Solar Saros 150 ===
- Preceded by: Solar eclipse of January 14, 1964
- Followed by: Solar eclipse of February 5, 2000

=== Inex ===
- Preceded by: Solar eclipse of February 14, 1953
- Followed by: Solar eclipse of January 4, 2011

=== Triad ===
- Preceded by: Solar eclipse of March 26, 1895
- Followed by: Solar eclipse of November 24, 2068

=== Solar eclipses of 1979–1982 ===
This eclipse is a member of a semester series. An eclipse in a semester series of solar eclipses repeats approximately every 177 days and 4 hours (a semester) at alternating nodes of the Moon's orbit.

The partial solar eclipses on June 21, 1982 and December 15, 1982 occur in the next lunar year eclipse set.

Solar eclipse series sets from 1979 to 1982
Descending node			Ascending node		
Saros	Map	Gamma	Saros	Map	Gamma
120 Totality in Brandon, MB, Canada	February 26, 1979 Total	0.8981	125	August 22, 1979 Annular	−0.9632
130	February 16, 1980 Total	0.2224	135	August 10, 1980 Annular	−0.1915
140	February 4, 1981 Annular	−0.4838	145	July 31, 1981 Total	0.5792
150	January 25, 1982 Partial	−1.2311	155	July 20, 1982 Partial	1.2886

=== Saros 150 ===
This eclipse is a part of Saros series 150, repeating every 18 years, 11 days, and containing 71 events. The series started with a partial solar eclipse on August 24, 1729. It contains annular eclipses from April 22, 2126 through June 22, 2829. There are no hybrid or total eclipses in this set. The series ends at member 71 as a partial eclipse on September 29, 2991. Its eclipses are tabulated in three columns; every third eclipse in the same column is one exeligmos apart, so they all cast shadows over approximately the same parts of the Earth.

The longest duration of annularity will be produced by member 45 at 9 minutes, 58 seconds on December 19, 2522. All eclipses in this series occur at the Moon’s descending node of orbit.

Series members 5–27 occur between 1801 and 2200:
5	6	7
October 7, 1801	October 19, 1819	October 29, 1837
8	9	10
November 9, 1855	November 20, 1873	December 1, 1891
11	12	13
December 12, 1909	December 24, 1927	January 3, 1946
14	15	16
January 14, 1964	January 25, 1982	February 5, 2000
17	18	19
February 15, 2018	February 27, 2036	March 9, 2054
20	21	22
March 19, 2072	March 31, 2090	April 11, 2108
23	24	25
April 22, 2126	May 3, 2144	May 14, 2162
26	27	
May 24, 2180	June 4, 2198	

=== Metonic series ===
The metonic series repeats eclipses every 19 years (6939.69 days), lasting about 5 cycles. Eclipses occur in nearly the same calendar date. In addition, the octon subseries repeats 1/5 of that or every 3.8 years (1387.94 days). All eclipses in this table occur at the Moon's descending node.

22 eclipse events between April 8, 1902 and August 31, 1989
April 7–8	January 24–25	November 12	August 31–September 1	June 19–20
108	110	112	114	116
April 8, 1902			August 31, 1913	June 19, 1917
118	120	122	124	126
April 8, 1921	January 24, 1925	November 12, 1928	August 31, 1932	June 19, 1936
128	130	132	134	136
April 7, 1940	January 25, 1944	November 12, 1947	September 1, 1951	June 20, 1955
138	140	142	144	146
April 8, 1959	January 25, 1963	November 12, 1966	August 31, 1970	June 20, 1974
148	150	152	154	
April 7, 1978	January 25, 1982	November 12, 1985	August 31, 1989	

=== Tritos series ===
This eclipse is a part of a tritos cycle, repeating at alternating nodes every 135 synodic months (≈ 3986.63 days, or 11 years minus 1 month). Their appearance and longitude are irregular due to a lack of synchronization with the anomalistic month (period of perigee), but groupings of 3 tritos cycles (≈ 33 years minus 3 months) come close (≈ 434.044 anomalistic months), so eclipses are similar in these groupings.

The partial solar eclipses on November 16, 2134 (part of Saros 164) and October 16, 2145 (part of Saros 165) are also a part of this series but are not included in the table below.

Series members between 1801 and 2069
June 6, 1807 (Saros 134)	May 5, 1818 (Saros 135)	April 3, 1829 (Saros 136)	March 4, 1840 (Saros 137)	February 1, 1851 (Saros 138)
December 31, 1861 (Saros 139)	November 30, 1872 (Saros 140)	October 30, 1883 (Saros 141)	September 29, 1894 (Saros 142)	August 30, 1905 (Saros 143)
July 30, 1916 (Saros 144)	June 29, 1927 (Saros 145)	May 29, 1938 (Saros 146)	April 28, 1949 (Saros 147)	March 27, 1960 (Saros 148)
February 25, 1971 (Saros 149)	January 25, 1982 (Saros 150)	December 24, 1992 (Saros 151)	November 23, 2003 (Saros 152)	October 23, 2014 (Saros 153)
September 21, 2025 (Saros 154)	August 21, 2036 (Saros 155)	July 22, 2047 (Saros 156)	June 21, 2058 (Saros 157)	May 20, 2069 (Saros 158)

=== Inex series ===
This eclipse is a part of the long period inex cycle, repeating at alternating nodes, every 358 synodic months (≈ 10,571.95 days, or 29 years minus 20 days). Their appearance and longitude are irregular due to a lack of synchronization with the anomalistic month (period of perigee). However, groupings of 3 inex cycles (≈ 87 years minus 2 months) comes close (≈ 1,151.02 anomalistic months), so eclipses are similar in these groupings.

Series members between 1801 and 2200
May 25, 1808 (Saros 144)	May 4, 1837 (Saros 145)	April 15, 1866 (Saros 146)
March 26, 1895 (Saros 147)	March 5, 1924 (Saros 148)	February 14, 1953 (Saros 149)
January 24, 1982 (Saros 150)	January 4, 2011 (Saros 151)	December 15, 2039 (Saros 152)
November 24, 2068 (Saros 153)	November 4, 2097 (Saros 154)	October 16, 2126 (Saros 155)
September 26, 2155 (Saros 156)	September 4, 2184 (Saros 157)	
