= August 2016 lunar eclipse =

Extremely short lunar eclipse

- Penumbral eclipse
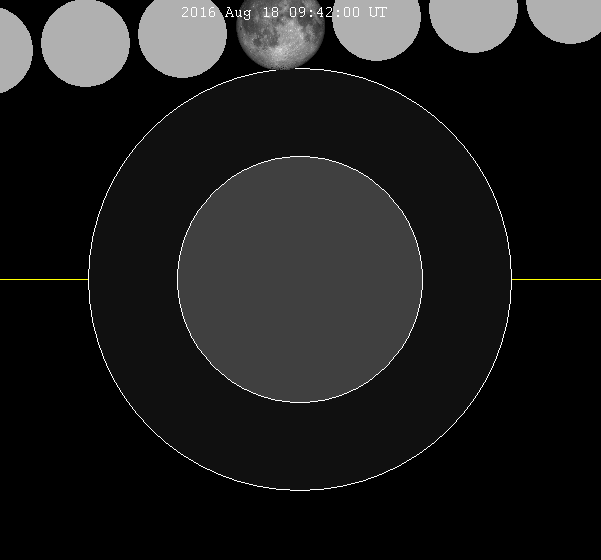
- The Moon barely clipped the northern penumbral shadow of the Earth.
- Date: August 18, 2016
- Gamma: 1.559
- Magnitude: −0.9925
- Saros cycle: 109 (72 of 72)
- Penumbral: 33 minutes, 36 seconds
Contacts (UTC)
- P1: 9:25:36
- Greatest: 9:42:24
- P4: 9:59:12

A penumbral lunar eclipse occurred at the Moon's descending node of orbit on Thursday, August 18, 2016, with an umbral magnitude of −0.9925. A lunar eclipse occurs when the Moon moves into the Earth's shadow, causing the Moon to be darkened. A penumbral lunar eclipse occurs when part or all of the Moon's near side passes into the Earth's penumbra. Unlike a solar eclipse, which can only be viewed from a relatively small area of the world, a lunar eclipse may be viewed from anywhere on the night side of Earth. Occurring about 3.4 days before perigee (on August 21, 2016, at 21:20 UTC), the Moon's apparent diameter was larger.

The HM National Almanac Office's online canon of eclipses lists this event as the last eclipse on Saros Series 109, while NASA lists August 8, 1998 as the last eclipse of the series, and has this event missing the shadow.

This eclipse grazed the northern boundary of the Earth's penumbral shadow. The event lasted 33 minutes and 36 seconds, beginning at 9:25 UTC and ending at 9:59. This produced a maximum penumbral magnitude of 0.0166. Eclipses of such small magnitudes are visually imperceptible; a penumbral magnitude of approximately 0.6 is required for even skilled observers to detect.

== Background ==
The Earth's penumbral shadow is larger than would be expected from simple geometry, a phenomenon first observed by Philippe de La Hire in 1707. The precise amount of enlargement varies over time for reasons which are not fully understood, but likely involve the amount of dust in certain layers of the Earth's atmosphere. Various eclipse almanacs have used different assumptions about the magnitude of this effect, resulting in disagreement about the predicted duration of lunar eclipses or, in the case of penumbral eclipses of very short duration, whether the eclipse will occur at all.

In 1989, NASA published a lunar eclipse almanac that predicted a short penumbral lunar eclipse to occur on 18 August 2016. However, the French almanac Connaissance des Temps used more conservative assumptions about the size of the Earth's shadow and did not predict an eclipse to occur at all. The Bureau des Longitudes in France continued to refine their lunar eclipse models; NASA's 2009 edition of its lunar eclipse almanac was based on their values, which effectively reclassified nine eclipses between 1801 and 2300 as non-events, including the one in August 2016. (Note: The others are: 22 April 1864, 21 June 1872, 26 October 1882, 21 February 1951, 28 October 2042, 7 March 2194, 30 April 2219, and 18 February 2288.)

Some resources, including the HM Nautical Almanac Office's online canon of eclipses, continued to list the 18 August 2016 event. Despite not appearing in NASA's printed lists of eclipses since the 2009 revision, AccuWeather reported the upcoming eclipse and projected this was the final member of Lunar Saros 109.

== Visibility ==
The eclipse was completely visible over Australia, North and South America, and Antarctica, seen rising over western Australia and northeast Asia and setting over eastern North and South America.

Hourly motion shown right to left

== Eclipse season ==
This eclipse is part of an eclipse season, a period, roughly every six months, when eclipses occur. Only two (or occasionally three) eclipse seasons occur each year, and each season lasts about 35 days and repeats just short of six months (173 days) later; thus two full eclipse seasons always occur each year. Either two or three eclipses happen each eclipse season. In the sequence below, each eclipse is separated by a fortnight. The first and last eclipse in this sequence is separated by one synodic month.

Eclipse season of August–September 2016
August 18 Descending node (full moon)	September 1 Ascending node (new moon)	September 16 Descending node (full moon)
Penumbral lunar eclipse Lunar Saros 109	Annular solar eclipse Solar Saros 135	Penumbral lunar eclipse Lunar Saros 147

== Related eclipses ==
=== Eclipses in 2016 ===
- A total solar eclipse on March 9.
- A penumbral lunar eclipse on March 23.
- A penumbral lunar eclipse on August 18.
- An annular solar eclipse on September 1.
- A penumbral lunar eclipse on September 16.

=== Metonic ===
- Followed by: Lunar eclipse of June 5, 2020

=== Tzolkinex ===
- Preceded by: Lunar eclipse of July 7, 2009

=== Tritos ===
- Followed by: Lunar eclipse of July 18, 2027

=== Lunar Saros 109 ===
- Preceded by: Lunar eclipse of August 8, 1998

=== Inex ===
- Preceded by: Lunar eclipse of April 14, 1987
- Followed by: Lunar eclipse of March 3, 2045

=== Triad ===
- Followed by: Lunar eclipse of June 20, 2103

=== Lunar eclipses of 2016–2020 ===
This eclipse is a member of a semester series. An eclipse in a semester series of lunar eclipses repeats approximately every 177 days and 4 hours (a semester) at alternating nodes of the Moon's orbit.

The penumbral lunar eclipses on March 23, 2016 and September 16, 2016 occur in the previous lunar year eclipse set, and the penumbral lunar eclipses on June 5, 2020 and November 30, 2020 occur in the next lunar year eclipse set.

Lunar eclipse series sets from 2016 to 2020
Descending node				Ascending node			
Saros	Date Viewing	Type Chart	Gamma	Saros	Date Viewing	Type Chart	Gamma
109	2016 Aug 18	Penumbral	1.5641	114	2017 Feb 11	Penumbral	−1.0255
119	2017 Aug 07	Partial	0.8669	124	2018 Jan 31	Total	−0.3014
129	2018 Jul 27	Total	0.1168	134	2019 Jan 21	Total	0.3684
139	2019 Jul 16	Partial	−0.6430	144	2020 Jan 10	Penumbral	1.0727
149	2020 Jul 05	Penumbral	−1.3639				

=== Saros 109 ===
This eclipse is a part of Saros series 109, repeating every 18 years, 11 days, and containing 71 or 72 events (depending on the source). The series started with a penumbral lunar eclipse on June 27, 736 AD. It contains partial eclipses from September 22, 880 AD through April 16, 1223; total eclipses from April 27, 1241 through October 17, 1529; and a second set of partial eclipses from October 28, 1547 through May 22, 1872. The series ends at member 71 as a penumbral eclipse on August 8, 1998, though some sources count a possible penumbral eclipse on August 18, 2016 as the last eclipse of the series.

The longest duration of totality was produced by member 35 at 99 minutes, 45 seconds on July 1, 1349. All eclipses in this series occur at the Moon’s descending node of orbit.

Greatest	First			
The greatest eclipse of the series occurred on 1349 Jul 01, lasting 99 minutes, 45 seconds.	Penumbral	Partial	Total	Central
The greatest eclipse of the series occurred on 1349 Jul 01, lasting 99 minutes, 45 seconds.	736 Jun 27	880 Sep 22	1241 Apr 27	1295 May 30
The greatest eclipse of the series occurred on 1349 Jul 01, lasting 99 minutes, 45 seconds.	Last			
The greatest eclipse of the series occurred on 1349 Jul 01, lasting 99 minutes, 45 seconds.	Central	Total	Partial	Penumbral
The greatest eclipse of the series occurred on 1349 Jul 01, lasting 99 minutes, 45 seconds.	1421 Aug 13	1529 Oct 17	1872 May 22	1998 Aug 08

Eclipses are tabulated in three columns; every third eclipse in the same column is one exeligmos apart, so they all cast shadows over approximately the same parts of the Earth.

Series members 61–72 occur between 1801 and 2016:
61	62	63
1818 Apr 21	1836 May 01	1854 May 12
64	65	66
1872 May 22	1890 Jun 03	1908 Jun 14
67	68	69
1926 Jun 25	1944 Jul 06	1962 Jul 17
70	71	72
1980 Jul 27	1998 Aug 08	2016 Aug 18

=== Inex series ===
This eclipse is a part of the long period inex cycle, repeating at alternating nodes, every 358 synodic months (≈ 10,571.95 days, or 29 years minus 20 days). Their appearance and longitude are irregular due to a lack of synchronization with the anomalistic month (period of perigee). However, groupings of 3 inex cycles (≈ 87 years minus 2 months) comes close (≈ 1,151.02 anomalistic months), so eclipses are similar in these groupings.

Series members between 1801 and 2200
1814 Jan 06 (Saros 102)	1842 Dec 17 (Saros 103)	
	2016 Aug 18 (Saros 109)	
2074 Jul 08 (Saros 111)	2103 Jun 20 (Saros 112)	2132 May 30 (Saros 113)
2161 May 09 (Saros 114)	2190 Apr 20 (Saros 115)	

== See also ==
- List of lunar eclipses
- List of 21st-century lunar eclipses
- October 2042 lunar eclipse
- July 2027 lunar eclipse

== Bibliography ==
- Espenak, Fred (1989). Fifty Year Canon of Lunar Eclipses: 1986–2035 (PDF). NASA. NASA Reference Publication 1216.
- Espenak, Fred; Meeus, Jean (2009). Five Millennium Catalog of Lunar Eclipses: -1999 to +3000 (2000 BCE to 3000 CE) (PDF). NASA. NASA/TP-2009-213173.
