= August 1998 lunar eclipse =

Penumbral lunar eclipse August 8, 1998

- Penumbral eclipse
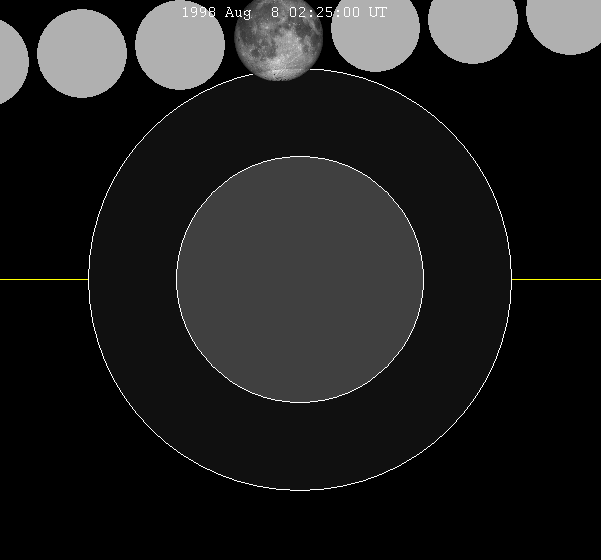
- The Moon's hourly motion shown right to left
- Date: August 8, 1998
- Gamma: 1.4876
- Magnitude: −0.8637
- Saros cycle: 109 (71 of 72)
- Penumbral: 96 minutes, 25 seconds
Contacts (UTC)
- P1: 1:36:50
- Greatest: 2:24:53
- P4: 3:13:15

A penumbral lunar eclipse occurred at the Moon’s descending node of orbit on Saturday, August 8, 1998, with an umbral magnitude of −0.8637. A lunar eclipse occurs when the Moon moves into the Earth's shadow, causing the Moon to be darkened. A penumbral lunar eclipse occurs when part or all of the Moon's near side passes into the Earth's penumbra. Unlike a solar eclipse, which can only be viewed from a relatively small area of the world, a lunar eclipse may be viewed from anywhere on the night side of Earth. Occurring about 3.4 days before perigee (on August 11, 1998, at 12:45 UTC), the Moon's apparent diameter was larger.

== Visibility ==
The eclipse was completely visible over eastern and central North America, South America, Africa, much of Europe, and Antarctica, seen rising over western North America and setting over eastern Europe and the Middle East.

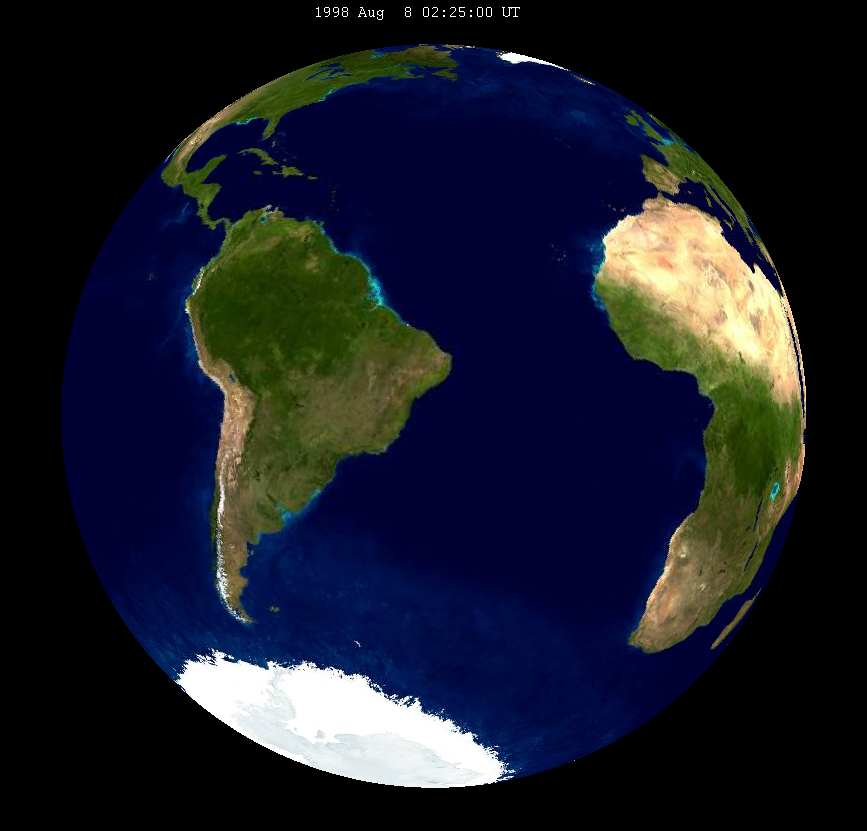
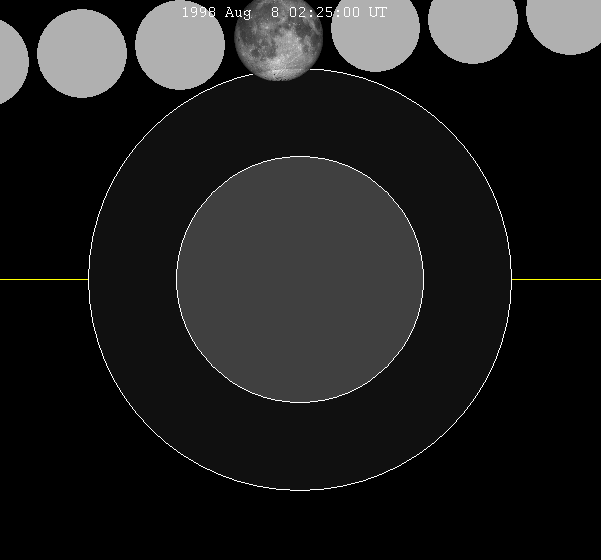

== Eclipse details ==
Shown below is a table displaying details about this particular solar eclipse. It describes various parameters pertaining to this eclipse.

August 8, 1998 Lunar Eclipse Parameters
Parameter	Value
Penumbral Magnitude	0.12064
Umbral Magnitude	−0.86370
Gamma	1.48757
Sun Right Ascension	09h11m18.0s
Sun Declination	+16°13'41.5"
Sun Semi-Diameter	15'46.4"
Sun Equatorial Horizontal Parallax	08.7"
Moon Right Ascension	21h10m04.5s
Moon Declination	-14°48'01.2"
Moon Semi-Diameter	16'01.4"
Moon Equatorial Horizontal Parallax	0°58'48.5"
ΔT	63.2 s

== Eclipse season ==
This eclipse is part of an eclipse season, a period, roughly every six months, when eclipses occur. Only two (or occasionally three) eclipse seasons occur each year, and each season lasts about 35 days and repeats just short of six months (173 days) later; thus two full eclipse seasons always occur each year. Either two or three eclipses happen each eclipse season. In the sequence below, each eclipse is separated by a fortnight. The first and last eclipse in this sequence is separated by one synodic month.

Eclipse season of August–September 1998
August 8 Descending node (full moon)	August 22 Ascending node (new moon)	September 6 Descending node (full moon)
Penumbral lunar eclipse Lunar Saros 109	Annular solar eclipse Solar Saros 135	Penumbral lunar eclipse Lunar Saros 147

== Related eclipses ==
=== Eclipses in 1998 ===
- A total solar eclipse on February 26.
- A penumbral lunar eclipse on March 13.
- A penumbral lunar eclipse on August 8.
- An annular solar eclipse on August 22.
- A penumbral lunar eclipse on September 6.

=== Metonic ===
- Followed by: Lunar eclipse of May 26, 2002

=== Tzolkinex ===
- Preceded by: Lunar eclipse of June 27, 1991

=== Tritos ===
- Followed by: Lunar eclipse of July 7, 2009

=== Lunar Saros 109 ===
- Preceded by: Lunar eclipse of July 27, 1980
- Followed by: Lunar eclipse of August 18, 2016

=== Inex ===
- Preceded by: Lunar eclipse of August 27, 1969
- Followed by: Lunar eclipse of July 18, 2027

=== Triad ===
- Followed by: Lunar eclipse of June 8, 2085

=== Lunar eclipses of 1998–2002 ===
This eclipse is a member of a semester series. An eclipse in a semester series of lunar eclipses repeats approximately every 177 days and 4 hours (a semester) at alternating nodes of the Moon's orbit.

The penumbral lunar eclipses on March 13, 1998 and September 6, 1998 occur in the previous lunar year eclipse set, and the penumbral lunar eclipses on May 26, 2002 and November 20, 2002 occur in the next lunar year eclipse set.

Lunar eclipse series sets from 1998 to 2002
Descending node				Ascending node			
Saros	Date Viewing	Type Chart	Gamma	Saros	Date Viewing	Type Chart	Gamma
109	1998 Aug 08	Penumbral	1.4876	114	1999 Jan 31	Penumbral	−1.0190
119	1999 Jul 28	Partial	0.7863	124	2000 Jan 21	Total	−0.2957
129	2000 Jul 16	Total	0.0302	134	2001 Jan 09	Total	0.3720
139	2001 Jul 05	Partial	−0.7287	144	2001 Dec 30	Penumbral	1.0732
149	2002 Jun 24	Penumbral	−1.4440				

=== Saros 109 ===
This eclipse is a part of Saros series 109, repeating every 18 years, 11 days, and containing 71 or 72 events (depending on the source). The series started with a penumbral lunar eclipse on June 27, 736 AD. It contains partial eclipses from September 22, 880 AD through April 16, 1223; total eclipses from April 27, 1241 through October 17, 1529; and a second set of partial eclipses from October 28, 1547 through May 22, 1872. The series ends at member 71 as a penumbral eclipse on August 8, 1998, though some sources count a possible penumbral eclipse on August 18, 2016 as the last eclipse of the series.

The longest duration of totality was produced by member 35 at 99 minutes, 45 seconds on July 1, 1349. All eclipses in this series occur at the Moon’s descending node of orbit.

Greatest	First			
The greatest eclipse of the series occurred on 1349 Jul 01, lasting 99 minutes, 45 seconds.	Penumbral	Partial	Total	Central
The greatest eclipse of the series occurred on 1349 Jul 01, lasting 99 minutes, 45 seconds.	736 Jun 27	880 Sep 22	1241 Apr 27	1295 May 30
The greatest eclipse of the series occurred on 1349 Jul 01, lasting 99 minutes, 45 seconds.	Last			
The greatest eclipse of the series occurred on 1349 Jul 01, lasting 99 minutes, 45 seconds.	Central	Total	Partial	Penumbral
The greatest eclipse of the series occurred on 1349 Jul 01, lasting 99 minutes, 45 seconds.	1421 Aug 13	1529 Oct 17	1872 May 22	1998 Aug 08

Eclipses are tabulated in three columns; every third eclipse in the same column is one exeligmos apart, so they all cast shadows over approximately the same parts of the Earth.

Series members 61–72 occur between 1801 and 2016:
61	62	63
1818 Apr 21	1836 May 01	1854 May 12
64	65	66
1872 May 22	1890 Jun 03	1908 Jun 14
67	68	69
1926 Jun 25	1944 Jul 06	1962 Jul 17
70	71	72
1980 Jul 27	1998 Aug 08	2016 Aug 18

=== Tritos series ===
This eclipse is a part of a tritos cycle, repeating at alternating nodes every 135 synodic months (≈ 3986.63 days, or 11 years minus 1 month). Their appearance and longitude are irregular due to a lack of synchronization with the anomalistic month (period of perigee), but groupings of 3 tritos cycles (≈ 33 years minus 3 months) come close (≈ 434.044 anomalistic months), so eclipses are similar in these groupings.

Series members between 1922 and 2200
1922 Mar 13 (Saros 102)	1933 Feb 10 (Saros 103)			
		1998 Aug 08 (Saros 109)	2009 Jul 07 (Saros 110)	2020 Jun 05 (Saros 111)
2031 May 07 (Saros 112)	2042 Apr 05 (Saros 113)	2053 Mar 04 (Saros 114)	2064 Feb 02 (Saros 115)	2075 Jan 02 (Saros 116)
2085 Dec 01 (Saros 117)	2096 Oct 31 (Saros 118)	2107 Oct 02 (Saros 119)	2118 Aug 31 (Saros 120)	2129 Jul 31 (Saros 121)
2140 Jun 30 (Saros 122)	2151 May 30 (Saros 123)	2162 Apr 29 (Saros 124)	2173 Mar 29 (Saros 125)	2184 Feb 26 (Saros 126)
2195 Jan 26 (Saros 127)

=== Inex series ===
This eclipse is a part of the long period inex cycle, repeating at alternating nodes, every 358 synodic months (≈ 10,571.95 days, or 29 years minus 20 days). Their appearance and longitude are irregular due to a lack of synchronization with the anomalistic month (period of perigee). However, groupings of 3 inex cycles (≈ 87 years minus 2 months) comes close (≈ 1,151.02 anomalistic months), so eclipses are similar in these groupings.

Series members between 1801 and 2200
1824 Dec 06 (Saros 103)		
		1969 Aug 27 (Saros 108)
1998 Aug 08 (Saros 109)	2027 Jul 18 (Saros 110)	2056 Jun 27 (Saros 111)
2085 Jun 08 (Saros 112)	2114 May 19 (Saros 113)	2143 Apr 29 (Saros 114)
2172 Apr 09 (Saros 115)

== See also ==
- List of lunar eclipses
- List of 20th-century lunar eclipses
