= Solar eclipse of July 20, 1944 =

20th-century annular solar eclipse

- Annular eclipse
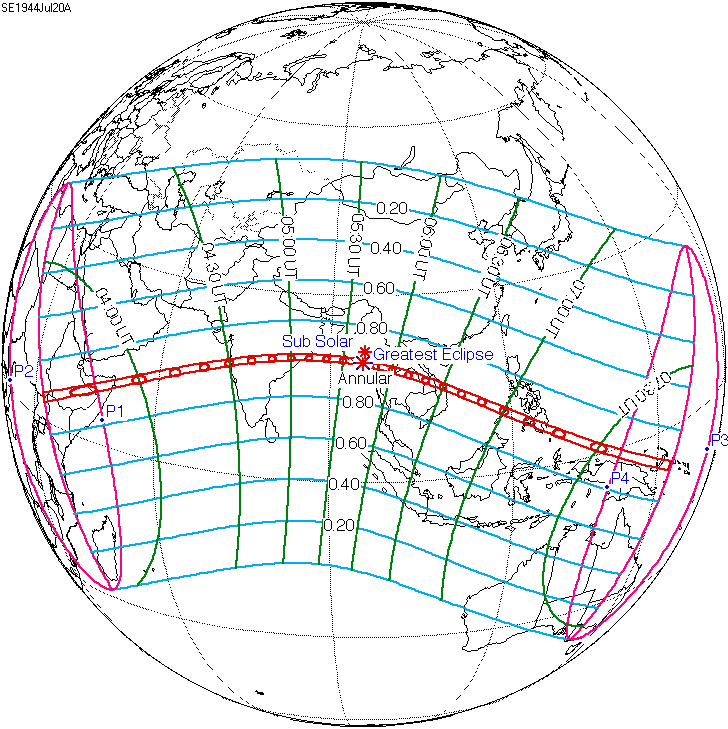
- Map
- Gamma: −0.0314
- Magnitude: 0.97

Maximum eclipse
- Duration: 222 s (3 min 42 s)
- Coordinates: 19°N 95.7°E
- Max. width of band: 108 km (67 mi)

Times (UTC)
- Greatest eclipse: 5:43:13

References
- Saros: 135 (35 of 71)
- Catalog # (SE5000): 9385

An annular solar eclipse occurred at the Moon's ascending node of orbit on Thursday, July 20, 1944, with a magnitude of 0.97. A solar eclipse occurs when the Moon passes between Earth and the Sun, thereby totally or partly obscuring the image of the Sun for a viewer on Earth. An annular solar eclipse occurs when the Moon's apparent diameter is smaller than the Sun's, blocking most of the Sun's light and causing the Sun to look like an annulus (ring). An annular eclipse appears as a partial eclipse over a region of the Earth thousands of kilometres wide. Occurring about 4.6 days before apogee (on July 24, 1944, at 19:20 UTC), the Moon's apparent diameter was smaller.

Annularity was visible from British Uganda (today's Uganda), Anglo-Egyptian Sudan (the part now belonging to South Sudan), British Kenya (today's Kenya), Ethiopia, British Somaliland (today's Somalia), British Raj (the part now belonging to India), Burma under Japanese occupation (today's Myanmar), Thailand, French Indochina (the parts now belonging to Laos and Vietnam), Philippines under Japanese occupation, South Seas Mandate in Japan (the part now belonging to Hatohobei, Palau) the Territory of New Guinea (now belonging to Papua New Guinea). A partial eclipse was visible for parts of East Africa, West Asia, Central Asia, South Asia, Southeast Asia, East Asia, and Australia.

== Eclipse details ==
Shown below are two tables displaying details about this particular solar eclipse. The first table outlines times at which the Moon's penumbra or umbra attains the specific parameter, and the second table describes various other parameters pertaining to this eclipse.

July 20, 1944 Solar Eclipse Times
Event	Time (UTC)
First Penumbral External Contact	1944 July 20 at 02:43:03.9 UTC
First Umbral External Contact	1944 July 20 at 03:46:12.4 UTC
First Central Line	1944 July 20 at 03:47:41.2 UTC
First Umbral Internal Contact	1944 July 20 at 03:49:10.0 UTC
First Penumbral Internal Contact	1944 July 20 at 04:52:23.2 UTC
Greatest Duration	1944 July 20 at 05:41:10.0 UTC
Ecliptic Conjunction	1944 July 20 at 05:42:50.9 UTC
Greatest Eclipse	1944 July 20 at 05:43:12.7 UTC
Equatorial Conjunction	1944 July 20 at 05:43:33.9 UTC
Last Penumbral Internal Contact	1944 July 20 at 06:34:00.8 UTC
Last Umbral Internal Contact	1944 July 20 at 07:37:13.5 UTC
Last Central Line	1944 July 20 at 07:38:44.7 UTC
Last Umbral External Contact	1944 July 20 at 07:40:16.0 UTC
Last Penumbral External Contact	1944 July 20 at 08:43:26.9 UTC

July 20, 1944 Solar Eclipse Parameters
Parameter	Value
Eclipse Magnitude	0.97004
Eclipse Obscuration	0.94098
Gamma	−0.03135
Sun Right Ascension	07h57m43.1s
Sun Declination	+20°41'32.4"
Sun Semi-Diameter	15'44.4"
Sun Equatorial Horizontal Parallax	08.7"
Moon Right Ascension	07h57m42.4s
Moon Declination	+20°39'49.3"
Moon Semi-Diameter	15'02.1"
Moon Equatorial Horizontal Parallax	0°55'10.8"
ΔT	26.5 s

== Eclipse season ==
This eclipse is part of an eclipse season, a period, roughly every six months, when eclipses occur. Only two (or occasionally three) eclipse seasons occur each year, and each season lasts about 35 days and repeats just short of six months (173 days) later; thus two full eclipse seasons always occur each year. Either two or three eclipses happen each eclipse season. In the sequence below, each eclipse is separated by a fortnight. The first and last eclipse in this sequence is separated by one synodic month.

Eclipse season of July–August 1944
July 6 Descending node (full moon)	July 20 Ascending node (new moon)	August 4 Descending node (full moon)
Penumbral lunar eclipse Lunar Saros 109	Annular solar eclipse Solar Saros 135	Penumbral lunar eclipse Lunar Saros 147

== Related eclipses ==
=== Eclipses in 1944 ===
- A total solar eclipse on January 25.
- A penumbral lunar eclipse on February 9.
- A penumbral lunar eclipse on July 6.
- An annular solar eclipse on July 20.
- A penumbral lunar eclipse on August 4.
- A penumbral lunar eclipse on December 29.

=== Metonic ===
- Preceded by: Solar eclipse of October 1, 1940
- Followed by: Solar eclipse of May 9, 1948

=== Tzolkinex ===
- Preceded by: Solar eclipse of June 8, 1937
- Followed by: Solar eclipse of September 1, 1951

=== Half-Saros ===
- Preceded by: Lunar eclipse of July 16, 1935
- Followed by: Lunar eclipse of July 26, 1953

=== Tritos ===
- Preceded by: Solar eclipse of August 21, 1933
- Followed by: Solar eclipse of June 20, 1955

=== Solar Saros 135 ===
- Preceded by: Solar eclipse of July 9, 1926
- Followed by: Solar eclipse of July 31, 1962

=== Inex ===
- Preceded by: Solar eclipse of August 10, 1915
- Followed by: Solar eclipse of June 30, 1973

=== Triad ===
- Preceded by: Solar eclipse of September 18, 1857
- Followed by: Solar eclipse of May 21, 2031

=== Solar eclipses of 1942–1946 ===
This eclipse is a member of a semester series. An eclipse in a semester series of solar eclipses repeats approximately every 177 days and 4 hours (a semester) at alternating nodes of the Moon's orbit.

The partial solar eclipses on March 16, 1942 and September 10, 1942 occur in the previous lunar year eclipse set, and the partial solar eclipses on May 30, 1946 and November 23, 1946 occur in the next lunar year eclipse set.

Solar eclipse series sets from 1942 to 1946
Ascending node			Descending node		
Saros	Map	Gamma	Saros	Map	Gamma
115	August 12, 1942 Partial	−1.5244	120	February 4, 1943 Total	0.8734
125	August 1, 1943 Annular	−0.8041	130	January 25, 1944 Total	0.2025
135	July 20, 1944 Annular	−0.0314	140	January 14, 1945 Annular	−0.4937
145	July 9, 1945 Total	0.7356	150	January 3, 1946 Partial	−1.2392
155	June 29, 1946 Partial	1.4361			

=== Saros 135 ===
This eclipse is a part of Saros series 135, repeating every 18 years, 11 days, and containing 71 events. The series started with a partial solar eclipse on July 5, 1331. It contains annular eclipses from October 21, 1511 through February 24, 2305; hybrid eclipses on March 8, 2323 and March 18, 2341; and total eclipses from March 29, 2359 through May 22, 2449. The series ends at member 71 as a partial eclipse on August 17, 2593. Its eclipses are tabulated in three columns; every third eclipse in the same column is one exeligmos apart, so they all cast shadows over approximately the same parts of the Earth.

The longest duration of annularity was produced by member 16 at 10 minutes, 41 seconds on December 24, 1601, and the longest duration of totality will be produced by member 62 at 2 minutes, 27 seconds on May 12, 2431. All eclipses in this series occur at the Moon’s ascending node of orbit.

Series members 28–49 occur between 1801 and 2200:
28	29	30
May 5, 1818	May 15, 1836	May 26, 1854
31	32	33
June 6, 1872	June 17, 1890	June 28, 1908
34	35	36
July 9, 1926	July 20, 1944	July 31, 1962
37	38	39
August 10, 1980	August 22, 1998	September 1, 2016
40	42	42
September 12, 2034	September 22, 2052	October 4, 2070
43	44	45
October 14, 2088	October 26, 2106	November 6, 2124
46	47	48
November 17, 2142	November 27, 2160	December 9, 2178
49
December 19, 2196

=== Metonic series ===
The metonic series repeats eclipses every 19 years (6939.69 days), lasting about 5 cycles. Eclipses occur in nearly the same calendar date. In addition, the octon subseries repeats 1/5 of that or every 3.8 years (1387.94 days). All eclipses in this table occur at the Moon's ascending node.

22 eclipse events between December 13, 1898 and July 20, 1982
December 13–14	October 1–2	July 20–21	May 9	February 24–25
111	113	115	117	119
December 13, 1898		July 21, 1906	May 9, 1910	February 25, 1914
121	123	125	127	129
December 14, 1917	October 1, 1921	July 20, 1925	May 9, 1929	February 24, 1933
131	133	135	137	139
December 13, 1936	October 1, 1940	July 20, 1944	May 9, 1948	February 25, 1952
141	143	145	147	149
December 14, 1955	October 2, 1959	July 20, 1963	May 9, 1967	February 25, 1971
151	153	155		
December 13, 1974	October 2, 1978	July 20, 1982		

=== Tritos series ===
This eclipse is a part of a tritos cycle, repeating at alternating nodes every 135 synodic months (≈ 3986.63 days, or 11 years minus 1 month). Their appearance and longitude are irregular due to a lack of synchronization with the anomalistic month (period of perigee), but groupings of 3 tritos cycles (≈ 33 years minus 3 months) come close (≈ 434.044 anomalistic months), so eclipses are similar in these groupings.

Series members between 1801 and 2200
August 28, 1802 (Saros 122)	July 27, 1813 (Saros 123)	June 26, 1824 (Saros 124)	May 27, 1835 (Saros 125)	April 25, 1846 (Saros 126)
March 25, 1857 (Saros 127)	February 23, 1868 (Saros 128)	January 22, 1879 (Saros 129)	December 22, 1889 (Saros 130)	November 22, 1900 (Saros 131)
October 22, 1911 (Saros 132)	September 21, 1922 (Saros 133)	August 21, 1933 (Saros 134)	July 20, 1944 (Saros 135)	June 20, 1955 (Saros 136)
May 20, 1966 (Saros 137)	April 18, 1977 (Saros 138)	March 18, 1988 (Saros 139)	February 16, 1999 (Saros 140)	January 15, 2010 (Saros 141)
December 14, 2020 (Saros 142)	November 14, 2031 (Saros 143)	October 14, 2042 (Saros 144)	September 12, 2053 (Saros 145)	August 12, 2064 (Saros 146)
July 13, 2075 (Saros 147)	June 11, 2086 (Saros 148)	May 11, 2097 (Saros 149)	April 11, 2108 (Saros 150)	March 11, 2119 (Saros 151)
February 8, 2130 (Saros 152)	January 8, 2141 (Saros 153)	December 8, 2151 (Saros 154)	November 7, 2162 (Saros 155)	October 7, 2173 (Saros 156)
September 4, 2184 (Saros 157)	August 5, 2195 (Saros 158)			

=== Inex series ===
This eclipse is a part of the long period inex cycle, repeating at alternating nodes, every 358 synodic months (≈ 10,571.95 days, or 29 years minus 20 days). Their appearance and longitude are irregular due to a lack of synchronization with the anomalistic month (period of perigee). However, groupings of 3 inex cycles (≈ 87 years minus 2 months) comes close (≈ 1,151.02 anomalistic months), so eclipses are similar in these groupings.

Series members between 1801 and 2200
October 9, 1828 (Saros 131)	September 18, 1857 (Saros 132)	August 29, 1886 (Saros 133)
August 10, 1915 (Saros 134)	July 20, 1944 (Saros 135)	June 30, 1973 (Saros 136)
June 10, 2002 (Saros 137)	May 21, 2031 (Saros 138)	April 30, 2060 (Saros 139)
April 10, 2089 (Saros 140)	March 22, 2118 (Saros 141)	March 2, 2147 (Saros 142)
February 10, 2176 (Saros 143)		
