= Solar eclipse of June 10, 2002 =

21st-century annular solar eclipse

- Annular eclipse
- Partial from Kitt Peak National Observatory
- Map
- Gamma: 0.1993
- Magnitude: 0.9962

Maximum eclipse
- Duration: 23 s (0 min 23 s)
- Coordinates: 34.5°N 178.6°W
- Max. width of band: 13 km (8.1 mi)

Times (UTC)
- Greatest eclipse: 23:45:22

References
- Saros: 137 (35 of 70)
- Catalog # (SE5000): 9513

An annular solar eclipse occurred at the Moon's ascending node of orbit between Monday, June 10 and Tuesday, June 11, 2002, with a magnitude of 0.9962. A solar eclipse occurs when the Moon passes between Earth and the Sun, thereby totally or partly obscuring the image of the Sun for a viewer on Earth. An annular solar eclipse occurs when the Moon's apparent diameter is smaller than the Sun's, blocking most of the Sun's light and causing the Sun to look like an annulus (ring). An annular eclipse appears as a partial eclipse over a region of the Earth thousands of kilometres wide. Occurring about 6.4 days after apogee (on June 4, 2002, at 14:00 UTC), the Moon's apparent diameter was smaller.

This was the second annular solar eclipse visible over the Pacific Ocean within 6 months.

Annularity was visible in Indonesia, Palau (all islands in its northernmost state, Kayangel), and the Northern Mariana Islands on June 11 (Tuesday), and the western tip of Jalisco, Mexico, on June 10 (Monday). A partial eclipse was visible for parts of eastern Asia, northeastern Australia, North America, and Hawaii.

It was partially visible in some areas of the United States; in Ventura, in southern California, some observation stations were set up for public viewing. In Palm Desert, in the Coachella Valley, it was clearly visible, and it "got dark, it got cool, and it got eerie".A solar eclipse party in Fresno drew around 400 attendees, and as far north as Napa Valley, dozens of people went outside to watch the eclipse., and it was visible in Utah. Canada's National Post predicted a "substantial crowd" for Vancouver, despite the eclipse there being less than 60%; even in Victoria, where the eclipse was as low as 30%, dozens attended a show at the Dominion Astrophysical Observatory.

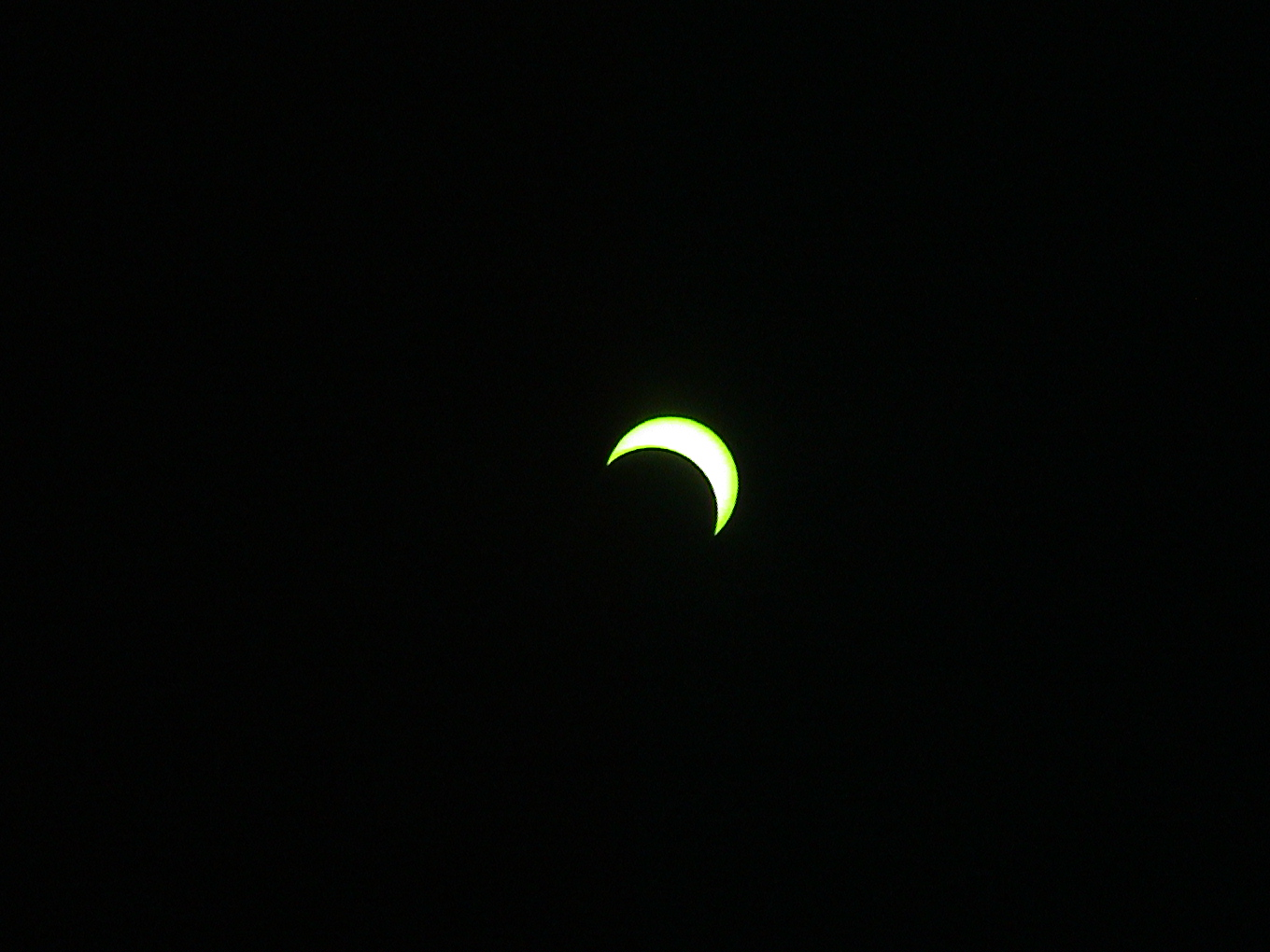
Partial from Los Angeles, California

== Observations ==
Animated path

During this eclipse, the apex of the Moon's umbral cone was close to the Earth's surface, and the magnitude was large. The edges of the Moon and the Sun were close to each other as seen from the Earth. Baily's beads on the lunar limb, which are usually only visible during a total solar eclipse, could also be seen. Since the path of annularity was mostly on the sea and covered very little land, and the Maluku sectarian conflict prevented many observers from going to the Maluku Islands, Indonesia, observations were mainly concentrated in Palau, Northern Mariana Islands and Mexico.

A Japanese team made a live webcast on Tinian Island. The local weather was clear at sunrise. The Sun was completely covered by clouds 20 minutes before the maximum eclipse, but finally came out from the clouds shortly before the maximum. In Mexico, because the annular eclipse occurred shortly before sunset and the solar zenith angle was extremely low on land, many people observed at sea off the ports including Puerto Vallarta. However, the eclipse was mostly clouded out due to the Tropical Storm Boris, and it even rained in some places. The sun only appeared occasionally.

== Eclipse timing ==
=== Places experiencing partial eclipse ===
Solar Eclipse of June 10, 2002 (Local Times)
Country or territory	City or place	Start of partial eclipse	Maximum eclipse	End of partial eclipse	Duration of eclipse (hr:min)	Maximum coverage
Australia	Darwin (Note: The times listed for this location occur on June 11, 2002, local time.)	07:03:58 (sunrise)	07:16:30	08:12:49	1:09	37.60%
Papua New Guinea	Mount Hagen	06:53:57	07:50:25	08:54:35	2:01	37.32%
Indonesia	Manokwari	06:01:04 (sunrise)	06:51:34	07:58:48	1:58	70.01%
Timor-Leste	Dili	06:48:11 (sunrise)	06:52:44	07:48:13	1:00	56.60%
Indonesia	Manado	05:33:58 (sunrise)	05:53:42	06:57:51	1:24	92.40%
Philippines	General Santos	05:24:41 (sunrise)	05:57:06	07:01:58	1:37	89.16%
Philippines	Davao City	05:21:16 (sunrise)	05:57:52	07:02:59	1:42	86.81%
Palau	Ngerulmud	05:56:35	06:58:34	08:09:31	2:13	96.14%
Federated States of Micronesia	Colonia	06:57:31	08:01:30	09:15:16	2:18	96.38%
Malaysia	Kota Kinabalu	06:01:19 (sunrise)	06:03:35	06:58:40	0:57	74.31%
Philippines	Manila	05:26:21 (sunrise)	06:05:31	07:05:48	1:39	57.47%
Federated States of Micronesia	Weno	06:57:55	08:06:55	09:28:20	2:30	63.68%
Guam	Hagåtña	07:01:05	08:09:21	09:29:10	2:28	96.37%
Brunei	Bandar Seri Begawan	06:07:44 (sunrise)	06:10:20	06:57:51	0:50	66.27%
Indonesia	Makassar	06:06:57 (sunrise)	06:10:20	06:51:35	0:45	54.05%
Northern Mariana Islands	Saipan	07:03:10	08:12:21	09:33:21	2:30	97.72%
Federated States of Micronesia	Palikir	08:02:22	09:12:41	10:36:07	2:34	49.38%
Hong Kong	Hong Kong	05:38:34 (sunrise)	06:15:05	07:05:08	1:27	29.92%
Vietnam	Hanoi	05:14:28 (sunrise)	05:16:57	06:00:48	0:46	24.47%
Taiwan	Taipei	05:28:13	06:17:51	07:12:09	1:44	32.35%
China	Shanghai	05:41:34	06:26:24	07:14:51	1:33	20.42%
Japan	Tokyo	06:42:04	07:40:32	08:45:22	2:03	34.01%
United States Minor Outlying Islands	Midway Atoll	11:01:21	12:40:52	14:25:22	3:24	74.60%
Canada	Vancouver	17:01:11	18:01:08	18:56:30	1:55	33.48%
Canada	Calgary	18:10:28	19:01:27	19:49:13	1:39	22.74%
Mexico	Mexico City	19:32:56	20:11:51	20:14:24 (sunset)	0:41	53.95%
United States	Los Angeles	17:13:18	18:21:57	19:23:01	2:10	71.15%
Mexico	Aguascalientes	19:31:05	20:29:27	20:31:59 (sunset)	1:01	86.37%
Mexico	Guadalajara	19:31:38	20:31:14	20:33:44 (sunset)	1:02	91.71%
Clipperton Island	Clipperton Island	16:39:31	17:35:25	17:37:46 (sunset)	0:58	58.71%

== Eclipse details ==
Shown below are two tables displaying details about this particular solar eclipse. The first table outlines times at which the Moon's penumbra or umbra attains the specific parameter, and the second table describes various other parameters pertaining to this eclipse.

June 10, 2002 Solar Eclipse Times
Event	Time (UTC)
First Penumbral External Contact	2002 June 10 at 20:52:54.3 UTC
First Umbral External Contact	2002 June 10 at 21:54:55.3 UTC
First Central Line	2002 June 10 at 21:55:34.4 UTC
Greatest Duration	2002 June 10 at 21:55:34.4 UTC
First Umbral Internal Contact	2002 June 10 at 21:56:13.5 UTC
First Penumbral Internal Contact	2002 June 10 at 23:00:25.2 UTC
Greatest Eclipse	2002 June 10 at 23:45:22.2 UTC
Ecliptic Conjunction	2002 June 10 at 23:47:35.5 UTC
Equatorial Conjunction	2002 June 10 at 23:49:19.1 UTC
Last Penumbral Internal Contact	2002 June 11 at 00:30:14.5 UTC
Last Umbral Internal Contact	2002 June 11 at 01:34:30.4 UTC
Last Central Line	2002 June 11 at 01:35:06.6 UTC
Last Umbral External Contact	2002 June 11 at 01:35:42.7 UTC
Last Penumbral External Contact	2002 June 11 at 02:37:41.9 UTC

June 10, 2002 Solar Eclipse Parameters
Parameter	Value
Eclipse Magnitude	0.99623
Eclipse Obscuration	0.99246
Gamma	0.19933
Sun Right Ascension	05h16m04.1s
Sun Declination	+23°03'18.9"
Sun Semi-Diameter	15'45.1"
Sun Equatorial Horizontal Parallax	08.7"
Moon Right Ascension	05h15m55.6s
Moon Declination	+23°14'25.0"
Moon Semi-Diameter	15'27.1"
Moon Equatorial Horizontal Parallax	0°56'42.5"
ΔT	64.3 s

== Eclipse season ==
This eclipse is part of an eclipse season, a period, roughly every six months, when eclipses occur. Only two (or occasionally three) eclipse seasons occur each year, and each season lasts about 35 days and repeats just short of six months (173 days) later; thus two full eclipse seasons always occur each year. Either two or three eclipses happen each eclipse season. In the sequence below, each eclipse is separated by a fortnight. The first and last eclipse in this sequence is separated by one synodic month.

Eclipse season of May–June 2002
May 26 Descending node (full moon)	June 10 Ascending node (new moon)	June 24 Descending node (full moon)
Penumbral lunar eclipse Lunar Saros 111	Annular solar eclipse Solar Saros 137	Penumbral lunar eclipse Lunar Saros 149

== Related eclipses ==
=== Eclipses in 2002 ===
- A penumbral lunar eclipse on May 26.
- An annular solar eclipse on June 10.
- A penumbral lunar eclipse on June 24.
- A penumbral lunar eclipse on November 20.
- A total solar eclipse on December 4.

=== Metonic ===
- Preceded by: Solar eclipse of August 22, 1998
- Followed by: Solar eclipse of March 29, 2006

=== Tzolkinex ===
- Preceded by: Solar eclipse of April 29, 1995
- Followed by: Solar eclipse of July 22, 2009

=== Half-Saros ===
- Preceded by: Lunar eclipse of June 4, 1993
- Followed by: Lunar eclipse of June 15, 2011

=== Tritos ===
- Preceded by: Solar eclipse of July 11, 1991
- Followed by: Solar eclipse of May 10, 2013

=== Solar Saros 137 ===
- Preceded by: Solar eclipse of May 30, 1984
- Followed by: Solar eclipse of June 21, 2020

=== Inex ===
- Preceded by: Solar eclipse of June 30, 1973
- Followed by: Solar eclipse of May 21, 2031

=== Triad ===
- Preceded by: Solar eclipse of August 10, 1915
- Followed by: Solar eclipse of April 10, 2089

=== Solar eclipses of 2000–2003 ===
This eclipse is a member of a semester series. An eclipse in a semester series of solar eclipses repeats approximately every 177 days and 4 hours (a semester) at alternating nodes of the Moon's orbit.

The partial solar eclipses on February 5, 2000 and July 31, 2000 occur in the previous lunar year eclipse set.

Solar eclipse series sets from 2000 to 2003
Ascending node			Descending node		
Saros	Map	Gamma	Saros	Map	Gamma
117	July 1, 2000 Partial	−1.28214	122 Partial projection in Minneapolis, MN, USA	December 25, 2000 Partial	1.13669
127 Totality in Lusaka, Zambia	June 21, 2001 Total	−0.57013	132 Partial in Minneapolis, MN, USA	December 14, 2001 Annular	0.40885
137 Partial in Los Angeles, CA, USA	June 10, 2002 Annular	0.19933	142 Totality in Woomera, South Australia	December 4, 2002 Total	−0.30204
147 Annularity in Culloden, Scotland	May 31, 2003 Annular	0.99598	152	November 23, 2003 Total	−0.96381

=== Saros 137 ===
This eclipse is a part of Saros series 137, repeating every 18 years, 11 days, and containing 70 events. The series started with a partial solar eclipse on May 25, 1389. It contains total eclipses from August 20, 1533 through December 6, 1695; the first set of hybrid eclipses from December 17, 1713 through February 11, 1804; the first set of annular eclipses from February 21, 1822 through March 25, 1876; the second set of hybrid eclipses from April 6, 1894 through April 28, 1930; and the second set of annular eclipses from May 9, 1948 through April 13, 2507. The series ends at member 70 as a partial eclipse on June 28, 2633. Its eclipses are tabulated in three columns; every third eclipse in the same column is one exeligmos apart, so they all cast shadows over approximately the same parts of the Earth.

The longest duration of totality was produced by member 11 at 2 minutes, 55 seconds on September 10, 1569, and the longest duration of annularity will be produced by member 59 at 7 minutes, 5 seconds on February 28, 2435. All eclipses in this series occur at the Moon’s ascending node of orbit.

Series members 24–46 occur between 1801 and 2200:
24	25	26
February 11, 1804	February 21, 1822	March 4, 1840
27	28	29
March 15, 1858	March 25, 1876	April 6, 1894
30	31	32
April 17, 1912	April 28, 1930	May 9, 1948
33	34	35
May 20, 1966	May 30, 1984	June 10, 2002
36	37	38
June 21, 2020	July 2, 2038	July 12, 2056
39	40	41
July 24, 2074	August 3, 2092	August 15, 2110
42	43	44
August 25, 2128	September 6, 2146	September 16, 2164
45	46	
September 27, 2182	October 9, 2200	

=== Metonic series ===
The metonic series repeats eclipses every 19 years (6939.69 days), lasting about 5 cycles. Eclipses occur in nearly the same calendar date. In addition, the octon subseries repeats 1/5 of that or every 3.8 years (1387.94 days). All eclipses in this table occur at the Moon's ascending node.

20 eclipse events between June 10, 1964 and August 21, 2036
June 10–11	March 28–29	January 14–16	November 3	August 21–22
117	119	121	123	125
June 10, 1964	March 28, 1968	January 16, 1972	November 3, 1975	August 22, 1979
127	129	131	133	135
June 11, 1983	March 29, 1987	January 15, 1991	November 3, 1994	August 22, 1998
137	139	141	143	145
June 10, 2002	March 29, 2006	January 15, 2010	November 3, 2013	August 21, 2017
147	149	151	153	155
June 10, 2021	March 29, 2025	January 14, 2029	November 3, 2032	August 21, 2036

=== Tritos series ===
This eclipse is a part of a tritos cycle, repeating at alternating nodes every 135 synodic months (≈ 3986.63 days, or 11 years minus 1 month). Their appearance and longitude are irregular due to a lack of synchronization with the anomalistic month (period of perigee), but groupings of 3 tritos cycles (≈ 33 years minus 3 months) come close (≈ 434.044 anomalistic months), so eclipses are similar in these groupings.

Series members between 1801 and 2200
December 21, 1805 (Saros 119)	November 19, 1816 (Saros 120)	October 20, 1827 (Saros 121)	September 18, 1838 (Saros 122)	August 18, 1849 (Saros 123)
July 18, 1860 (Saros 124)	June 18, 1871 (Saros 125)	May 17, 1882 (Saros 126)	April 16, 1893 (Saros 127)	March 17, 1904 (Saros 128)
February 14, 1915 (Saros 129)	January 14, 1926 (Saros 130)	December 13, 1936 (Saros 131)	November 12, 1947 (Saros 132)	October 12, 1958 (Saros 133)
September 11, 1969 (Saros 134)	August 10, 1980 (Saros 135)	July 11, 1991 (Saros 136)	June 10, 2002 (Saros 137)	May 10, 2013 (Saros 138)
April 8, 2024 (Saros 139)	March 9, 2035 (Saros 140)	February 5, 2046 (Saros 141)	January 5, 2057 (Saros 142)	December 6, 2067 (Saros 143)
November 4, 2078 (Saros 144)	October 4, 2089 (Saros 145)	September 4, 2100 (Saros 146)	August 4, 2111 (Saros 147)	July 4, 2122 (Saros 148)
June 3, 2133 (Saros 149)	May 3, 2144 (Saros 150)	April 2, 2155 (Saros 151)	March 2, 2166 (Saros 152)	January 29, 2177 (Saros 153)
December 29, 2187 (Saros 154)	November 28, 2198 (Saros 155)			

=== Inex series ===
This eclipse is a part of the long period inex cycle, repeating at alternating nodes, every 358 synodic months (≈ 10,571.95 days, or 29 years minus 20 days). Their appearance and longitude are irregular due to a lack of synchronization with the anomalistic month (period of perigee). However, groupings of 3 inex cycles (≈ 87 years minus 2 months) comes close (≈ 1,151.02 anomalistic months), so eclipses are similar in these groupings.

Series members between 1801 and 2200
October 9, 1828 (Saros 131)	September 18, 1857 (Saros 132)	August 29, 1886 (Saros 133)
August 10, 1915 (Saros 134)	July 20, 1944 (Saros 135)	June 30, 1973 (Saros 136)
June 10, 2002 (Saros 137)	May 21, 2031 (Saros 138)	April 30, 2060 (Saros 139)
April 10, 2089 (Saros 140)	March 22, 2118 (Saros 141)	March 2, 2147 (Saros 142)
February 10, 2176 (Saros 143)		
