= Solar eclipse of August 22, 1998 =

20th-century annular solar eclipse

- Annular eclipse
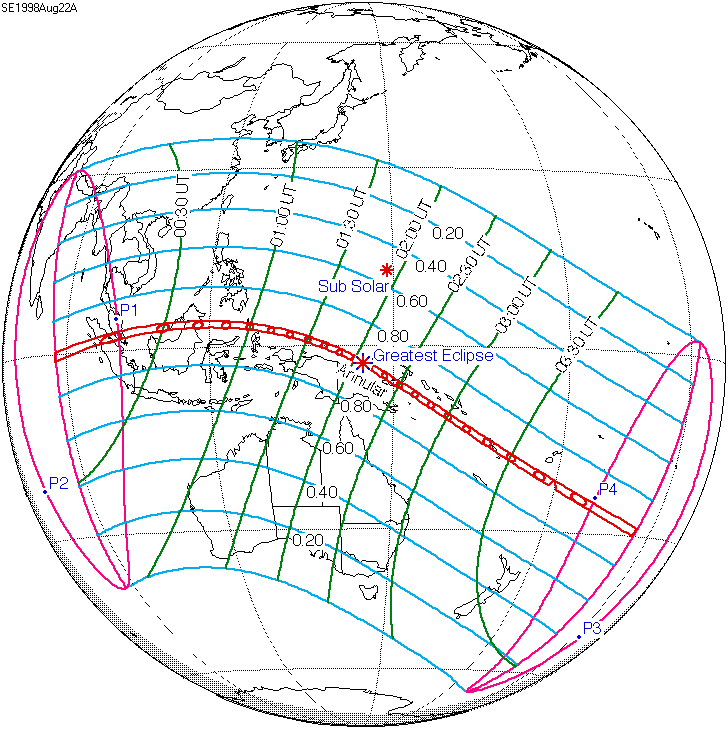
- Map
- Gamma: −0.2644
- Magnitude: 0.9734

Maximum eclipse
- Duration: 194 s (3 min 14 s)
- Coordinates: 3°S 145.4°E
- Max. width of band: 99 km (62 mi)

Times (UTC)
- Greatest eclipse: 2:07:11

References
- Saros: 135 (38 of 71)
- Catalog # (SE5000): 9504

An annular solar eclipse occurred at the Moon’s ascending node of orbit on Saturday, August 22, 1998, with a magnitude of 0.9734. A solar eclipse occurs when the Moon passes between Earth and the Sun, thereby totally or partly obscuring the image of the Sun for a viewer on Earth. An annular solar eclipse occurs when the Moon's apparent diameter is smaller than the Sun's, blocking most of the Sun's light and causing the Sun to look like an annulus (ring). An annular eclipse appears as a partial eclipse over a region of the Earth thousands of kilometres wide. Occurring about 5.2 days before apogee (on August 27, 1998, at 7:30 UTC), the Moon's apparent diameter was smaller.

Annularity was visible in Indonesia, Malaysia, Papua New Guinea, Solomon Islands (Bellona Island and Rennell Island) and Vanuatu. A partial eclipse was visible for parts of Southeast Asia, East Asia, Australia, and Oceania.

== Observations ==

It is usually very dry in Malaysia in August. But due to the El Niño, it rained every day for 2 weeks before the eclipse. On the eclipse day, the Sun was seen going in and out the gaps of the clouds at first, and later the clouds dispersed near Kota Tinggi District, the observation site of NASA's Johnson Space Center. The whole annular phase was seen. The sky cleared up completely 40 minutes later.

== Eclipse timing ==
=== Places experiencing annular eclipse ===
Solar eclipse of August 22, 1998 (local times)
Country or territory	City or place	Start of partial eclipse	Start of annular eclipse	Maximum eclipse	End of annular eclipse	End of partial eclipse	Duration of annularity (min:s)	Duration of eclipse (hr:min)	Maximum coverage
Malaysia	Malacca City	07:10:32	08:19:13	08:20:37	08:22:01	09:44:30	2:48	2:36	92.96%
Vanuatu	Luganville	12:37:39	14:21:21	14:22:22	14:23:23	15:50:22	2:02	3:13	93.99%

=== Places experiencing partial eclipse ===
Solar eclipse of August 22, 1998 (local times)
Country or territory	City or place	Start of partial eclipse	Maximum eclipse	End of partial eclipse	Duration of eclipse (hr:min)	Maximum coverage
Myanmar	Yangon	05:50:14 (sunrise)	06:46:47	07:52:54	2:03	39.84%
Thailand	Bangkok	06:14:22	07:18:13	08:32:27	2:18	52.75%
Malaysia	Kuala Lumpur	07:10:20	08:19:55	09:43:00	2:33	91.65%
Cambodia	Phnom Penh	06:12:28	07:21:06	08:42:18	2:30	62.74%
Singapore	Singapore	07:10:56	08:22:15	09:48:01	2:37	91.98%
Vietnam	Ho Chi Minh City	06:12:09	07:22:40	08:46:35	2:34	66.45%
Indonesia	Jakarta	06:17:11	07:29:29	08:56:53	2:40	64.67%
Brunei	Bandar Seri Begawan	07:13:45	08:34:02	10:12:19	2:59	90.88%
Philippines	Manila	07:21:20	08:40:57	10:15:35	2:54	55.56%
Philippines	General Santos	07:22:19	08:53:04	10:42:43	3:20	86.15%
Philippines	Davao City	07:22:44	08:53:26	10:42:39	3:20	82.48%
Timor-Leste	Dili	07:37:39	09:08:50	10:57:44	3:20	56.58%
Palau	Ngerulmud	08:36:16	10:16:28	12:10:33	3:34	75.53%
Federated States of Micronesia	Colonia	09:43:21	11:24:20	13:15:49	3:32	64.88%
Australia	Darwin	09:24:48	11:00:51	12:49:38	3:25	48.14%
Papua New Guinea	Port Moresby	10:26:11	12:22:53	14:13:13	3:47	79.59%
Australia	Cairns	10:40:17	12:29:29	14:12:35	3:32	54.61%
Solomon Islands	Honiara	12:06:09	13:59:49	15:37:15	3:31	89.39%
Australia	Brisbane	11:26:33	13:00:36	14:25:23	2:59	37.83%
Nauru	Yaren	13:23:02	15:03:30	16:29:20	3:06	47.65%
New Caledonia	Nouméa	12:45:31	14:25:37	15:50:52	3:05	74.62%
Vanuatu	Port Vila	12:43:45	14:26:10	15:52:23	3:09	92.47%
Tuvalu	Funafuti	14:08:08	15:35:45	16:49:47	2:42	51.80%
New Zealand	Auckland	14:20:04	15:37:28	16:46:15	2:26	41.58%
Fiji	Suva	14:09:31	15:41:17	16:58:44	2:49	85.27%
Wallis and Futuna	Mata Utu	14:20:32	15:44:50	16:56:28	2:36	60.89%
Tonga	Nuku'alofa	15:23:50	16:48:46	18:01:19	2:37	86.65%
Samoa	Apia	15:29:59	16:49:10	17:57:05	2:27	56.99%
Niue	Alofi (Note: The times listed for this location occur on August 21, 1998, local time.)	15:32:44	16:52:19	18:00:50	2:28	72.80%
Cook Islands	Rarotonga	16:45:43	17:57:05	18:27:01 (sunset)	1:41	69.92%

== Eclipse details ==
Shown below are two tables displaying details about this particular solar eclipse. The first table outlines times at which the Moon's penumbra or umbra attains the specific parameter, and the second table describes various other parameters pertaining to this eclipse.

August 22, 1998 solar eclipse times
Event	Time (UTC)
First penumbral external contact	1998 August 21 at 23:11:19.7 UTC
First umbral external contact	1998 August 22 at 00:15:19.1 UTC
First central line	1998 August 22 at 00:16:42.3 UTC
First umbral internal contact	1998 August 22 at 00:18:05.7 UTC
First penumbral internal contact	1998 August 22 at 01:26:40.7 UTC
Greatest duration	1998 August 22 at 01:59:47.4 UTC
Ecliptic conjunction	1998 August 22 at 02:04:08.9 UTC
Greatest eclipse	1998 August 22 at 02:07:10.5 UTC
Equatorial conjunction	1998 August 22 at 02:15:05.3 UTC
Last penumbral internal contact	1998 August 22 at 02:47:26.3 UTC
Last umbral internal contact	1998 August 22 at 03:56:07.6 UTC
Last central line	1998 August 22 at 03:57:33.7 UTC
Last umbral external contact	1998 August 22 at 03:58:59.8 UTC
Last penumbral external contact	1998 August 22 at 05:03:03.8 UTC

August 22, 1998 solar eclipse parameters
Parameter	Value
Eclipse magnitude	0.97336
Eclipse obscuration	0.94742
Gamma	−0.26441
Sun right ascension	10h03m45.9s
Sun declination	+11°53'26.2"
Sun semi-diameter	15'48.7"
Sun equatorial horizontal parallax	08.7"
Moon right ascension	10h03m30.7s
Moon declination	+11°39'14.3"
Moon semi-diameter	15'09.7"
Moon equatorial horizontal parallax	0°55'38.7"
ΔT	63.3 s

== Eclipse season ==
This eclipse is part of an eclipse season, a period, roughly every six months, when eclipses occur. Only two (or occasionally three) eclipse seasons occur each year, and each season lasts about 35 days and repeats just short of six months (173 days) later; thus two full eclipse seasons always occur each year. Either two or three eclipses happen each eclipse season. In the sequence below, each eclipse is separated by a fortnight. The first and last eclipse in this sequence is separated by one synodic month.

Eclipse season of August–September 1998
August 8 Descending node (full moon)	August 22 Ascending node (new moon)	September 6 Descending node (full moon)
Penumbral lunar eclipse Lunar Saros 109	Annular solar eclipse Solar Saros 135	Penumbral lunar eclipse Lunar Saros 147

== Related eclipses ==
=== Eclipses in 1998 ===
- A total solar eclipse on February 26
- A penumbral lunar eclipse on March 13
- A penumbral lunar eclipse on August 8
- An annular solar eclipse on August 22
- A penumbral lunar eclipse on September 6

=== Metonic ===
- Preceded by: Solar eclipse of November 3, 1994
- Followed by: Solar eclipse of June 10, 2002

=== Tzolkinex ===
- Preceded by: Solar eclipse of July 11, 1991
- Followed by: Solar eclipse of October 3, 2005

=== Half-Saros ===
- Preceded by: Lunar eclipse of August 16, 1989
- Followed by: Lunar eclipse of August 28, 2007

=== Tritos ===
- Preceded by: Solar eclipse of September 23, 1987
- Followed by: Solar eclipse of July 22, 2009

=== Solar Saros 135 ===
- Preceded by: Solar eclipse of August 10, 1980
- Followed by: Solar eclipse of September 1, 2016

=== Inex ===
- Preceded by: Solar eclipse of September 11, 1969
- Followed by: Solar eclipse of August 2, 2027

=== Triad ===
- Preceded by: Solar eclipse of October 22, 1911
- Followed by: Solar eclipse of June 22, 2085

=== Solar eclipses of 1997–2000 ===
This eclipse is a member of a semester series. An eclipse in a semester series of solar eclipses repeats approximately every 177 days and 4 hours (a semester) at alternating nodes of the Moon's orbit.

The partial solar eclipses on July 1, 2000 and December 25, 2000 occur in the next lunar year eclipse set.

Solar eclipse series sets from 1997 to 2000
Descending node			Ascending node		
Saros	Map	Gamma	Saros	Map	Gamma
120 Totality in Chita, Russia	March 9, 1997 Total	0.9183	125	September 2, 1997 Partial	−1.0352
130 Totality near Guadeloupe	February 26, 1998 Total	0.2391	135	August 22, 1998 Annular	−0.2644
140	February 16, 1999 Annular	−0.4726	145 Totality in France	August 11, 1999 Total	0.5062
150	February 5, 2000 Partial	−1.2233	155	July 31, 2000 Partial	1.2166

=== Saros 135 ===
This eclipse is a part of Saros series 135, repeating every 18 years, 11 days, and containing 71 events. The series started with a partial solar eclipse on July 5, 1331. It contains annular eclipses from October 21, 1511 through February 24, 2305; hybrid eclipses on March 8, 2323 and March 18, 2341; and total eclipses from March 29, 2359 through May 22, 2449. The series ends at member 71 as a partial eclipse on August 17, 2593. Its eclipses are tabulated in three columns; every third eclipse in the same column is one exeligmos apart, so they all cast shadows over approximately the same parts of the Earth.

The longest duration of annularity was produced by member 16 at 10 minutes, 41 seconds on December 24, 1601, and the longest duration of totality will be produced by member 62 at 2 minutes, 27 seconds on May 12, 2431. All eclipses in this series occur at the Moon’s ascending node of orbit.

Series members 28–49 occur between 1801 and 2200:
28	29	30
May 5, 1818	May 15, 1836	May 26, 1854
31	32	33
June 6, 1872	June 17, 1890	June 28, 1908
34	35	36
July 9, 1926	July 20, 1944	July 31, 1962
37	38	39
August 10, 1980	August 22, 1998	September 1, 2016
40	42	42
September 12, 2034	September 22, 2052	October 4, 2070
43	44	45
October 14, 2088	October 26, 2106	November 6, 2124
46	47	48
November 17, 2142	November 27, 2160	December 9, 2178
49
December 19, 2196

=== Metonic series ===
The metonic series repeats eclipses every 19 years (6939.69 days), lasting about 5 cycles. Eclipses occur in nearly the same calendar date. In addition, the octon subseries repeats 1/5 of that or every 3.8 years (1387.94 days). All eclipses in this table occur at the Moon's ascending node.

20 eclipse events between June 10, 1964 and August 21, 2036
June 10–11	March 28–29	January 14–16	November 3	August 21–22
117	119	121	123	125
June 10, 1964	March 28, 1968	January 16, 1972	November 3, 1975	August 22, 1979
127	129	131	133	135
June 11, 1983	March 29, 1987	January 15, 1991	November 3, 1994	August 22, 1998
137	139	141	143	145
June 10, 2002	March 29, 2006	January 15, 2010	November 3, 2013	August 21, 2017
147	149	151	153	155
June 10, 2021	March 29, 2025	January 14, 2029	November 3, 2032	August 21, 2036

=== Tritos series ===
This eclipse is a part of a tritos cycle, repeating at alternating nodes every 135 synodic months (≈ 3986.63 days, or 11 years minus 1 month). Their appearance and longitude are irregular due to a lack of synchronization with the anomalistic month (period of perigee), but groupings of 3 tritos cycles (≈ 33 years minus 3 months) come close (≈ 434.044 anomalistic months), so eclipses are similar in these groupings.

Series members between 1801 and 2200
March 4, 1802 (Saros 117)	February 1, 1813 (Saros 118)	January 1, 1824 (Saros 119)	November 30, 1834 (Saros 120)	October 30, 1845 (Saros 121)
September 29, 1856 (Saros 122)	August 29, 1867 (Saros 123)	July 29, 1878 (Saros 124)	June 28, 1889 (Saros 125)	May 28, 1900 (Saros 126)
April 28, 1911 (Saros 127)	March 28, 1922 (Saros 128)	February 24, 1933 (Saros 129)	January 25, 1944 (Saros 130)	December 25, 1954 (Saros 131)
November 23, 1965 (Saros 132)	October 23, 1976 (Saros 133)	September 23, 1987 (Saros 134)	August 22, 1998 (Saros 135)	July 22, 2009 (Saros 136)
June 21, 2020 (Saros 137)	May 21, 2031 (Saros 138)	April 20, 2042 (Saros 139)	March 20, 2053 (Saros 140)	February 17, 2064 (Saros 141)
January 16, 2075 (Saros 142)	December 16, 2085 (Saros 143)	November 15, 2096 (Saros 144)	October 16, 2107 (Saros 145)	September 15, 2118 (Saros 146)
August 15, 2129 (Saros 147)	July 14, 2140 (Saros 148)	June 14, 2151 (Saros 149)	May 14, 2162 (Saros 150)	April 12, 2173 (Saros 151)
March 12, 2184 (Saros 152)	February 10, 2195 (Saros 153)			

=== Inex series ===
This eclipse is a part of the long period inex cycle, repeating at alternating nodes, every 358 synodic months (≈ 10,571.95 days, or 29 years minus 20 days). Their appearance and longitude are irregular due to a lack of synchronization with the anomalistic month (period of perigee). However, groupings of 3 inex cycles (≈ 87 years minus 2 months) comes close (≈ 1,151.02 anomalistic months), so eclipses are similar in these groupings.

Series members between 1801 and 2200
December 20, 1824 (Saros 129)	November 30, 1853 (Saros 130)	November 10, 1882 (Saros 131)
October 22, 1911 (Saros 132)	October 1, 1940 (Saros 133)	September 11, 1969 (Saros 134)
August 22, 1998 (Saros 135)	August 2, 2027 (Saros 136)	July 12, 2056 (Saros 137)
June 22, 2085 (Saros 138)	June 3, 2114 (Saros 139)	May 14, 2143 (Saros 140)
April 23, 2172 (Saros 141)		
