= July 1980 lunar eclipse =

Penumbral lunar eclipse July 27, 1980

- Penumbral eclipse
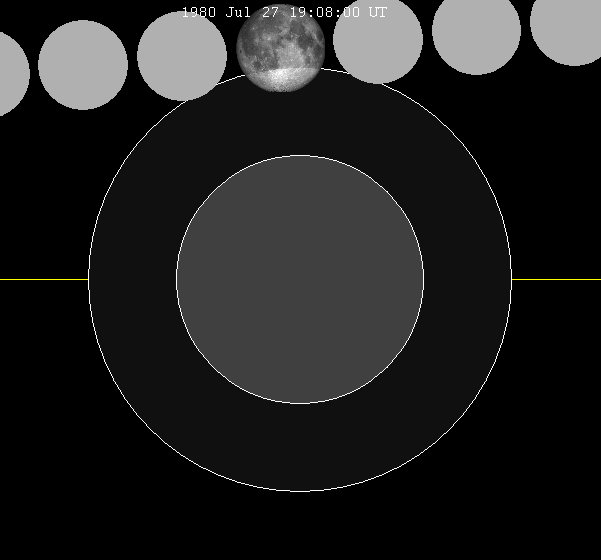
- The Moon's hourly motion shown right to left
- Date: July 27, 1980
- Gamma: 1.4139
- Magnitude: −0.7263
- Saros cycle: 109 (71 of 73)
- Penumbral: 137 minutes, 33 seconds
Contacts (UTC)
- P1: 17:59:29
- Greatest: 19:08:08
- P4: 20:17:02

A penumbral lunar eclipse occurred at the Moon’s descending node of orbit on Sunday, July 27, 1980, with an umbral magnitude of −0.7263. A lunar eclipse occurs when the Moon moves into the Earth's shadow, causing the Moon to be darkened. A penumbral lunar eclipse occurs when part or all of the Moon's near side passes into the Earth's penumbra. Unlike a solar eclipse, which can only be viewed from a relatively small area of the world, a lunar eclipse may be viewed from anywhere on the night side of Earth. Occurring about 3.2 days before perigee (on July 30, 1980, at 23:40 UTC), the Moon's apparent diameter was larger.

== Visibility ==
The eclipse was completely visible over central and east Africa, eastern Europe, much of Asia, Australia, and Antarctica, seen rising over western Europe and west Africa and setting over northeast Asia and the western Pacific Ocean.

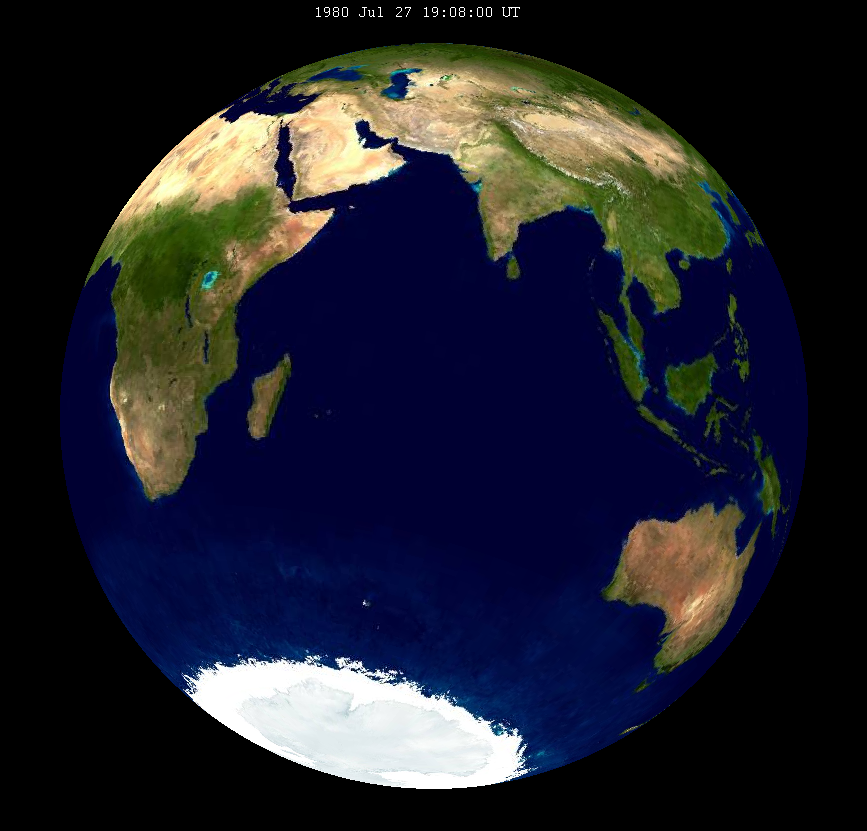
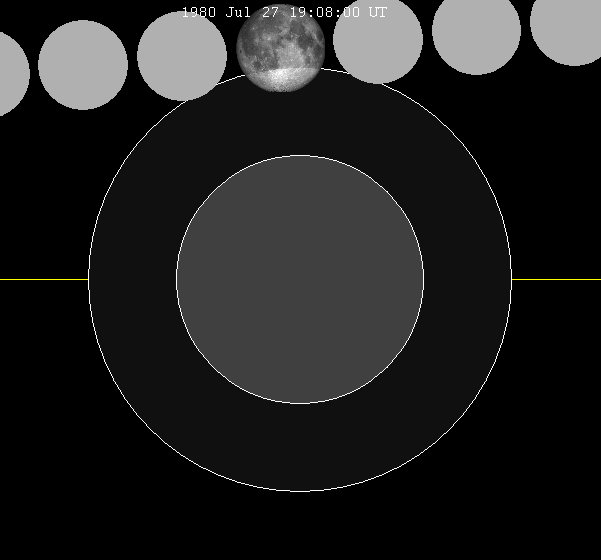

== Eclipse details ==
Shown below is a table displaying details about this particular solar eclipse. It describes various parameters pertaining to this eclipse.

July 27, 1980 Lunar Eclipse Parameters
Parameter	Value
Penumbral Magnitude	0.25354
Umbral Magnitude	−0.72634
Gamma	1.41391
Sun Right Ascension	08h28m52.6s
Sun Declination	+19°02'51.8"
Sun Semi-Diameter	15'45.1"
Sun Equatorial Horizontal Parallax	08.7"
Moon Right Ascension	20h28m01.0s
Moon Declination	-17°40'21.2"
Moon Semi-Diameter	16'04.5"
Moon Equatorial Horizontal Parallax	0°58'59.8"
ΔT	51.0 s

== Eclipse season ==
This eclipse is part of an eclipse season, a period, roughly every six months, when eclipses occur. Only two (or occasionally three) eclipse seasons occur each year, and each season lasts about 35 days and repeats just short of six months (173 days) later; thus two full eclipse seasons always occur each year. Either two or three eclipses happen each eclipse season. In the sequence below, each eclipse is separated by a fortnight. The first and last eclipse in this sequence is separated by one synodic month.

Eclipse season of July–August 1980
July 27 Descending node (full moon)	August 10 Ascending node (new moon)	August 26 Descending node (full moon)
Penumbral lunar eclipse Lunar Saros 109	Annular solar eclipse Solar Saros 135	Penumbral lunar eclipse Lunar Saros 147

== Related eclipses ==
=== Eclipses in 1980 ===
- A total solar eclipse on February 16.
- A penumbral lunar eclipse on March 1.
- A penumbral lunar eclipse on July 27.
- An annular solar eclipse on August 10.
- A penumbral lunar eclipse on August 26.

=== Metonic ===
- Followed by: Lunar eclipse of May 15, 1984

=== Tzolkinex ===
- Preceded by: Lunar eclipse of June 15, 1973

=== Half-Saros ===
- Preceded by: Solar eclipse of July 22, 1971

=== Tritos ===
- Preceded by: Lunar eclipse of August 27, 1969
- Followed by: Lunar eclipse of June 27, 1991

=== Lunar Saros 109 ===
- Preceded by: Lunar eclipse of July 17, 1962
- Followed by: Lunar eclipse of August 8, 1998

=== Inex ===
- Preceded by: Lunar eclipse of August 17, 1951
- Followed by: Lunar eclipse of July 7, 2009

=== Triad ===
- Preceded by: Lunar eclipse of September 25, 1893
- Followed by: Lunar eclipse of May 28, 2067

=== Lunar eclipses of 1980–1984 ===
This eclipse is a member of a semester series. An eclipse in a semester series of lunar eclipses repeats approximately every 177 days and 4 hours (a semester) at alternating nodes of the Moon's orbit.

The penumbral lunar eclipses on March 1, 1980 and August 26, 1980 occur in the previous lunar year eclipse set, and the penumbral lunar eclipses on May 15, 1984 and November 8, 1984 occur in the next lunar year eclipse set.

Lunar eclipse series sets from 1980 to 1984
Descending node				Ascending node			
Saros	Date Viewing	Type Chart	Gamma	Saros	Date Viewing	Type Chart	Gamma
109	1980 Jul 27	Penumbral	1.4139	114	1981 Jan 20	Penumbral	−1.0142
119	1981 Jul 17	Partial	0.7045	124	1982 Jan 09	Total	−0.2916
129	1982 Jul 06	Total	−0.0579	134	1982 Dec 30	Total	0.3758
139	1983 Jun 25	Partial	−0.8152	144	1983 Dec 20	Penumbral	1.0747
149	1984 Jun 13	Penumbral	−1.5240				

=== Saros 109 ===
This eclipse is a part of Saros series 109, repeating every 18 years, 11 days, and containing 71 or 72 events (depending on the source). The series started with a penumbral lunar eclipse on June 27, 736 AD. It contains partial eclipses from September 22, 880 AD through April 16, 1223; total eclipses from April 27, 1241 through October 17, 1529; and a second set of partial eclipses from October 28, 1547 through May 22, 1872. The series ends at member 71 as a penumbral eclipse on August 8, 1998, though some sources count a possible penumbral eclipse on August 18, 2016 as the last eclipse of the series.

The longest duration of totality was produced by member 35 at 99 minutes, 45 seconds on July 1, 1349. All eclipses in this series occur at the Moon’s descending node of orbit.

Greatest	First			
The greatest eclipse of the series occurred on 1349 Jul 01, lasting 99 minutes, 45 seconds.	Penumbral	Partial	Total	Central
The greatest eclipse of the series occurred on 1349 Jul 01, lasting 99 minutes, 45 seconds.	736 Jun 27	880 Sep 22	1241 Apr 27	1295 May 30
The greatest eclipse of the series occurred on 1349 Jul 01, lasting 99 minutes, 45 seconds.	Last			
The greatest eclipse of the series occurred on 1349 Jul 01, lasting 99 minutes, 45 seconds.	Central	Total	Partial	Penumbral
The greatest eclipse of the series occurred on 1349 Jul 01, lasting 99 minutes, 45 seconds.	1421 Aug 13	1529 Oct 17	1872 May 22	1998 Aug 08

Eclipses are tabulated in three columns; every third eclipse in the same column is one exeligmos apart, so they all cast shadows over approximately the same parts of the Earth.

Series members 61–72 occur between 1801 and 2016:
61	62	63
1818 Apr 21	1836 May 01	1854 May 12
64	65	66
1872 May 22	1890 Jun 03	1908 Jun 14
67	68	69
1926 Jun 25	1944 Jul 06	1962 Jul 17
70	71	72
1980 Jul 27	1998 Aug 08	2016 Aug 18

=== Tritos series ===
This eclipse is a part of a tritos cycle, repeating at alternating nodes every 135 synodic months (≈ 3986.63 days, or 11 years minus 1 month). Their appearance and longitude are irregular due to a lack of synchronization with the anomalistic month (period of perigee), but groupings of 3 tritos cycles (≈ 33 years minus 3 months) come close (≈ 434.044 anomalistic months), so eclipses are similar in these groupings.

Series members between 1904 and 2200
1904 Mar 02 (Saros 102)	1915 Jan 31 (Saros 103)			
	1969 Aug 27 (Saros 108)	1980 Jul 27 (Saros 109)	1991 Jun 27 (Saros 110)	2002 May 26 (Saros 111)
2013 Apr 25 (Saros 112)	2024 Mar 25 (Saros 113)	2035 Feb 22 (Saros 114)	2046 Jan 22 (Saros 115)	2056 Dec 22 (Saros 116)
2067 Nov 21 (Saros 117)	2078 Oct 21 (Saros 118)	2089 Sep 19 (Saros 119)	2100 Aug 19 (Saros 120)	2111 Jul 21 (Saros 121)
2122 Jun 20 (Saros 122)	2133 May 19 (Saros 123)	2144 Apr 18 (Saros 124)	2155 Mar 19 (Saros 125)	2166 Feb 15 (Saros 126)
2177 Jan 14 (Saros 127)	2187 Dec 15 (Saros 128)	2198 Nov 13 (Saros 129)		

=== Inex series ===
This eclipse is a part of the long period inex cycle, repeating at alternating nodes, every 358 synodic months (≈ 10,571.95 days, or 29 years minus 20 days). Their appearance and longitude are irregular due to a lack of synchronization with the anomalistic month (period of perigee). However, groupings of 3 inex cycles (≈ 87 years minus 2 months) comes close (≈ 1,151.02 anomalistic months), so eclipses are similar in these groupings.

Series members between 1801 and 2200
1806 Nov 26 (Saros 103)		1864 Oct 15 (Saros 105)
1893 Sep 25 (Saros 106)		1951 Aug 17 (Saros 108)
1980 Jul 27 (Saros 109)	2009 Jul 07 (Saros 110)	2038 Jun 17 (Saros 111)
2067 May 28 (Saros 112)	2096 May 07 (Saros 113)	2125 Apr 18 (Saros 114)
2154 Mar 29 (Saros 115)	2183 Mar 09 (Saros 116)	

=== Half-Saros cycle ===
A lunar eclipse will be preceded and followed by solar eclipses by 9 years and 5.5 days (a half saros). This lunar eclipse is related to one partial solar eclipse of Solar Saros 116.

July 22, 1971
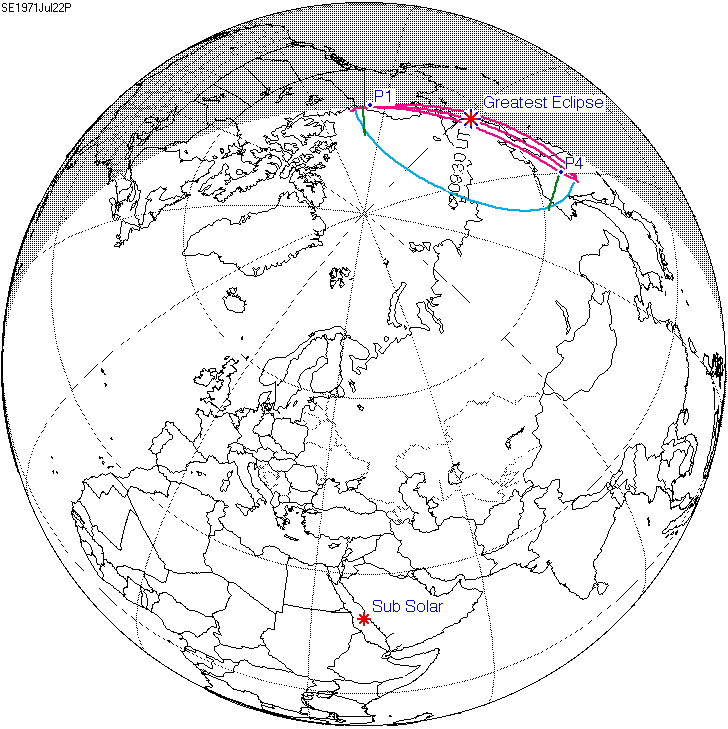

== See also ==
- List of lunar eclipses
- List of 20th-century lunar eclipses
