= July 1944 lunar eclipse =

Penumbral lunar eclipse took place on July 6, 1944

- Penumbral eclipse
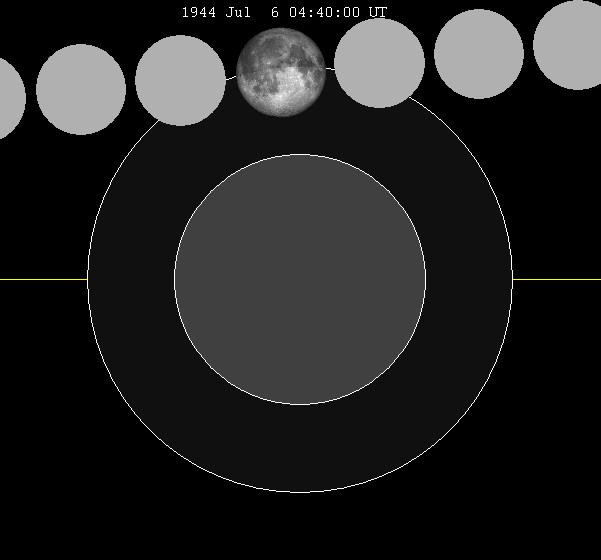
- The Moon's hourly motion shown right to left
- Date: July 6, 1944
- Gamma: 1.2597
- Magnitude: −0.4398
- Saros cycle: 109 (69 of 73)
- Penumbral: 192 minutes, 43 seconds
Contacts (UTC)
- P1: 3:03:18
- Greatest: 4:39:34
- P4: 6:16:01

A penumbral lunar eclipse occurred at the Moon’s descending node of orbit on Thursday, July 6, 1944, with an umbral magnitude of −0.4398. A lunar eclipse occurs when the Moon moves into the Earth's shadow, causing the Moon to be darkened. A penumbral lunar eclipse occurs when part or all of the Moon's near side passes into the Earth's penumbra. Unlike a solar eclipse, which can only be viewed from a relatively small area of the world, a lunar eclipse may be viewed from anywhere on the night side of Earth. Occurring about 2.8 days before perigee (on July 8, 1944, at 23:40 UTC), the Moon's apparent diameter was larger.

This eclipse was the second of four penumbral lunar eclipses in 1944, with the others occurring on February 9, August 4, and December 29.

== Visibility ==
The eclipse was completely visible over much of North America, South America, and Antarctica, seen rising over northwestern North America and the central Pacific Ocean and setting over western Europe and Africa.

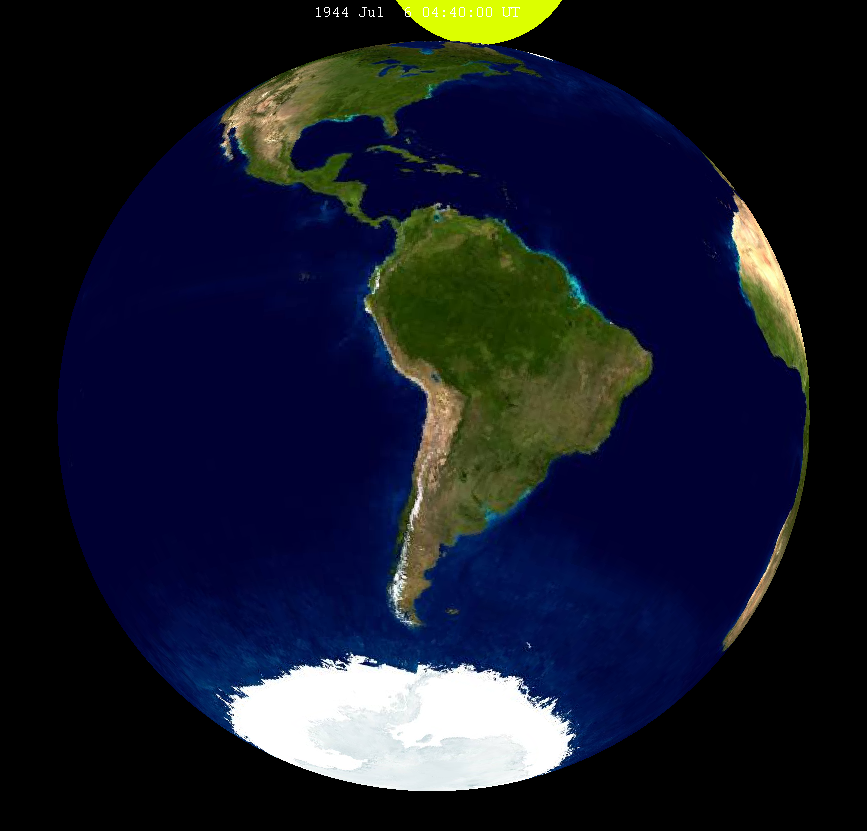
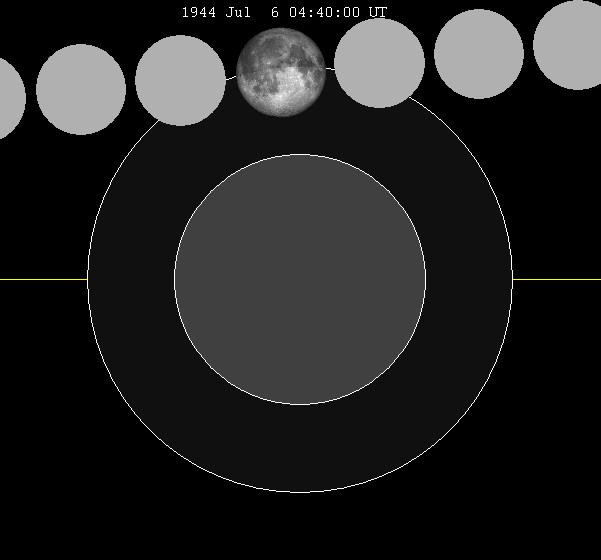

== Eclipse details ==
Shown below is a table displaying details about this particular solar eclipse. It describes various parameters pertaining to this eclipse.

July 6, 1944 Lunar Eclipse Parameters
Parameter	Value
Penumbral Magnitude	0.53278
Umbral Magnitude	−0.43977
Gamma	1.25971
Sun Right Ascension	07h00m41.1s
Sun Declination	+22°42'44.2"
Sun Semi-Diameter	15'43.9"
Sun Equatorial Horizontal Parallax	08.6"
Moon Right Ascension	19h00m38.4s
Moon Declination	-21°27'57.6"
Moon Semi-Diameter	16'10.5"
Moon Equatorial Horizontal Parallax	0°59'21.8"
ΔT	26.6 s

== Eclipse season ==
This eclipse is part of an eclipse season, a period, roughly every six months, when eclipses occur. Only two (or occasionally three) eclipse seasons occur each year, and each season lasts about 35 days and repeats just short of six months (173 days) later; thus two full eclipse seasons always occur each year. Either two or three eclipses happen each eclipse season. In the sequence below, each eclipse is separated by a fortnight. The first and last eclipse in this sequence is separated by one synodic month.

Eclipse season of July–August 1944
July 6 Descending node (full moon)	July 20 Ascending node (new moon)	August 4 Descending node (full moon)
Penumbral lunar eclipse Lunar Saros 109	Annular solar eclipse Solar Saros 135	Penumbral lunar eclipse Lunar Saros 147

== Related eclipses ==
=== Eclipses in 1944 ===
- A total solar eclipse on January 25.
- A penumbral lunar eclipse on February 9.
- A penumbral lunar eclipse on July 6.
- An annular solar eclipse on July 20.
- A penumbral lunar eclipse on August 4.
- A penumbral lunar eclipse on December 29.

=== Metonic ===
- Followed by: Lunar eclipse of April 23, 1948

=== Tzolkinex ===
- Preceded by: Lunar eclipse of May 25, 1937
- Followed by: Lunar eclipse of August 17, 1951

=== Half-Saros ===
- Preceded by: Solar eclipse of June 30, 1935
- Followed by: Solar eclipse of July 11, 1953

=== Tritos ===
- Preceded by: Lunar eclipse of August 5, 1933
- Followed by: Lunar eclipse of June 5, 1955

=== Lunar Saros 109 ===
- Preceded by: Lunar eclipse of June 25, 1926
- Followed by: Lunar eclipse of July 17, 1962

=== Inex ===
- Preceded by: Lunar eclipse of July 26, 1915
- Followed by: Lunar eclipse of June 15, 1973

=== Triad ===
- Preceded by: Lunar eclipse of September 4, 1857
- Followed by: Lunar eclipse of May 7, 2031

=== Lunar eclipses of 1944–1947 ===
This eclipse is a member of a semester series. An eclipse in a semester series of lunar eclipses repeats approximately every 177 days and 4 hours (a semester) at alternating nodes of the Moon's orbit.

The penumbral lunar eclipses on February 9, 1944 and August 4, 1944 occur in the previous lunar year eclipse set.

Lunar eclipse series sets from 1944 to 1947
Descending node				Ascending node			
Saros	Date Viewing	Type Chart	Gamma	Saros	Date Viewing	Type Chart	Gamma
109	1944 Jul 06	Penumbral	1.2597	114	1944 Dec 29	Penumbral	−1.0115
119	1945 Jun 25	Partial	0.5370	124	1945 Dec 19	Total	−0.2845
129	1946 Jun 14	Total	−0.2324	134	1946 Dec 08	Total	0.3864
139	1947 Jun 03	Partial	−0.9850	144	1947 Nov 28	Penumbral	1.0838

=== Saros 109 ===
This eclipse is a part of Saros series 109, repeating every 18 years, 11 days, and containing 71 or 72 events (depending on the source). The series started with a penumbral lunar eclipse on June 27, 736 AD. It contains partial eclipses from September 22, 880 AD through April 16, 1223; total eclipses from April 27, 1241 through October 17, 1529; and a second set of partial eclipses from October 28, 1547 through May 22, 1872. The series ends at member 71 as a penumbral eclipse on August 8, 1998, though some sources count a possible penumbral eclipse on August 18, 2016 as the last eclipse of the series.

The longest duration of totality was produced by member 35 at 99 minutes, 45 seconds on July 1, 1349. All eclipses in this series occur at the Moon’s descending node of orbit.

Greatest	First			
The greatest eclipse of the series occurred on 1349 Jul 01, lasting 99 minutes, 45 seconds.	Penumbral	Partial	Total	Central
The greatest eclipse of the series occurred on 1349 Jul 01, lasting 99 minutes, 45 seconds.	736 Jun 27	880 Sep 22	1241 Apr 27	1295 May 30
The greatest eclipse of the series occurred on 1349 Jul 01, lasting 99 minutes, 45 seconds.	Last			
The greatest eclipse of the series occurred on 1349 Jul 01, lasting 99 minutes, 45 seconds.	Central	Total	Partial	Penumbral
The greatest eclipse of the series occurred on 1349 Jul 01, lasting 99 minutes, 45 seconds.	1421 Aug 13	1529 Oct 17	1872 May 22	1998 Aug 08

Eclipses are tabulated in three columns; every third eclipse in the same column is one exeligmos apart, so they all cast shadows over approximately the same parts of the Earth.

Series members 61–72 occur between 1801 and 2016:
61	62	63
1818 Apr 21	1836 May 01	1854 May 12
64	65	66
1872 May 22	1890 Jun 03	1908 Jun 14
67	68	69
1926 Jun 25	1944 Jul 06	1962 Jul 17
70	71	72
1980 Jul 27	1998 Aug 08	2016 Aug 18

=== Tritos series ===
This eclipse is a part of a tritos cycle, repeating at alternating nodes every 135 synodic months (≈ 3986.63 days, or 11 years minus 1 month). Their appearance and longitude are irregular due to a lack of synchronization with the anomalistic month (period of perigee), but groupings of 3 tritos cycles (≈ 33 years minus 3 months) come close (≈ 434.044 anomalistic months), so eclipses are similar in these groupings.

Series members between 1835 and 2200
1835 May 12 (Saros 99)	1846 Apr 11 (Saros 100)		1868 Feb 08 (Saros 102)	1879 Jan 08 (Saros 103)
				1933 Aug 05 (Saros 108)
1944 Jul 06 (Saros 109)	1955 Jun 05 (Saros 110)	1966 May 04 (Saros 111)	1977 Apr 04 (Saros 112)	1988 Mar 03 (Saros 113)
1999 Jan 31 (Saros 114)	2009 Dec 31 (Saros 115)	2020 Nov 30 (Saros 116)	2031 Oct 30 (Saros 117)	2042 Sep 29 (Saros 118)
2053 Aug 29 (Saros 119)	2064 Jul 28 (Saros 120)	2075 Jun 28 (Saros 121)	2086 May 28 (Saros 122)	2097 Apr 26 (Saros 123)
2108 Mar 27 (Saros 124)	2119 Feb 25 (Saros 125)	2130 Jan 24 (Saros 126)	2140 Dec 23 (Saros 127)	2151 Nov 24 (Saros 128)
2162 Oct 23 (Saros 129)	2173 Sep 21 (Saros 130)	2184 Aug 21 (Saros 131)	2195 Jul 22 (Saros 132)	

=== Inex series ===
This eclipse is a part of the long period inex cycle, repeating at alternating nodes, every 358 synodic months (≈ 10,571.95 days, or 29 years minus 20 days). Their appearance and longitude are irregular due to a lack of synchronization with the anomalistic month (period of perigee). However, groupings of 3 inex cycles (≈ 87 years minus 2 months) comes close (≈ 1,151.02 anomalistic months), so eclipses are similar in these groupings.

Series members between 1801 and 2200
1828 Sep 23 (Saros 105)	1857 Sep 04 (Saros 106)	1886 Aug 14 (Saros 107)
1915 Jul 26 (Saros 108)	1944 Jul 06 (Saros 109)	1973 Jun 15 (Saros 110)
2002 May 26 (Saros 111)	2031 May 07 (Saros 112)	2060 Apr 15 (Saros 113)
2089 Mar 26 (Saros 114)	2118 Mar 07 (Saros 115)	2147 Feb 15 (Saros 116)
2176 Jan 26 (Saros 117)

=== Half-Saros cycle ===
A lunar eclipse will be preceded and followed by solar eclipses by 9 years and 5.5 days (a half saros). This lunar eclipse is related to two total solar eclipses of Solar Saros 116.

June 30, 1935	July 11, 1953

== See also ==
- List of lunar eclipses
- List of 20th-century lunar eclipses
