= July 1962 lunar eclipse =

Penumbral lunar eclipse July 17, 1962

- Penumbral eclipse
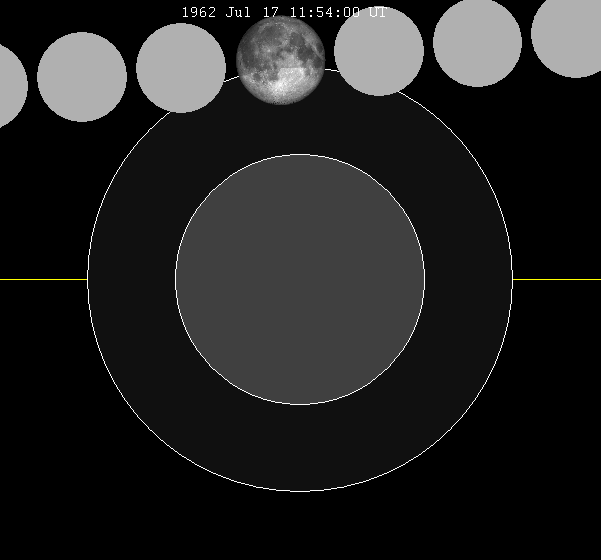
- The Moon's hourly motion shown right to left
- Date: July 17, 1962
- Gamma: 1.3371
- Magnitude: −0.5835
- Saros cycle: 109 (70 of 73)
- Penumbral: 168 minutes, 16 seconds
Contacts (UTC)
- P1: 10:30:13
- Greatest: 11:54:15
- P4: 13:18:29

A penumbral lunar eclipse occurred at the Moon’s descending node of orbit on Tuesday, July 17, 1962, with an umbral magnitude of −0.5835. A lunar eclipse occurs when the Moon moves into the Earth's shadow, causing the Moon to be darkened. A penumbral lunar eclipse occurs when part or all of the Moon's near side passes into the Earth's penumbra. Unlike a solar eclipse, which can only be viewed from a relatively small area of the world, a lunar eclipse may be viewed from anywhere on the night side of Earth. Occurring about 3 days before perigee (on July 20, 1962, at 11:00 UTC), the Moon's apparent diameter was larger.

== Visibility ==
The eclipse was completely visible over Australia, Antarctica, and the Pacific Ocean, seen rising over east and southeast Asia and setting over much of North America and western South America.

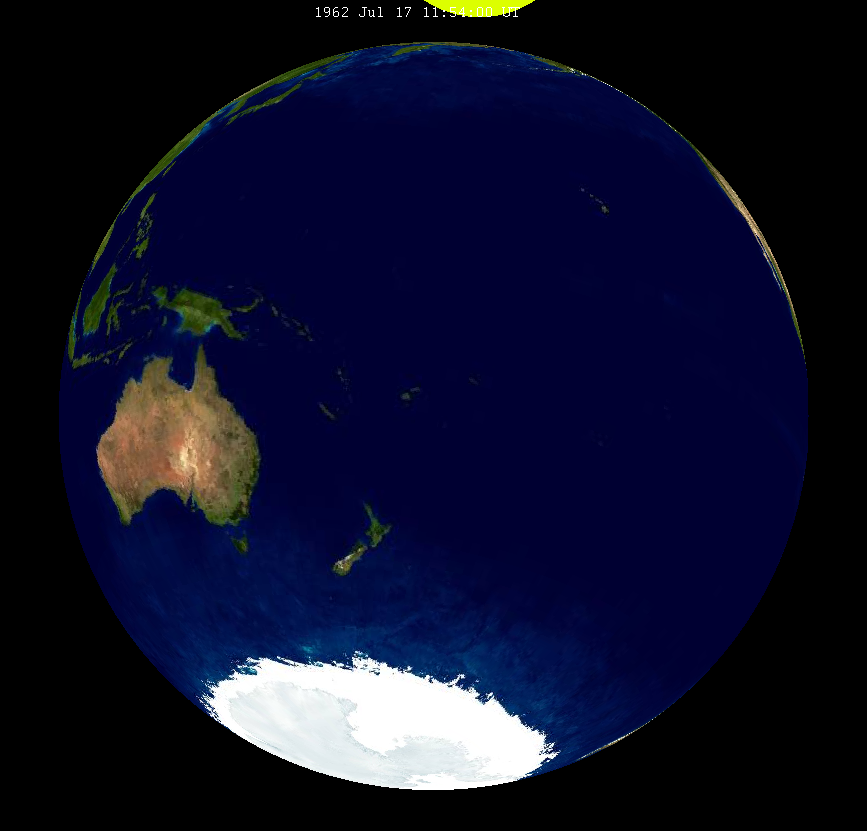
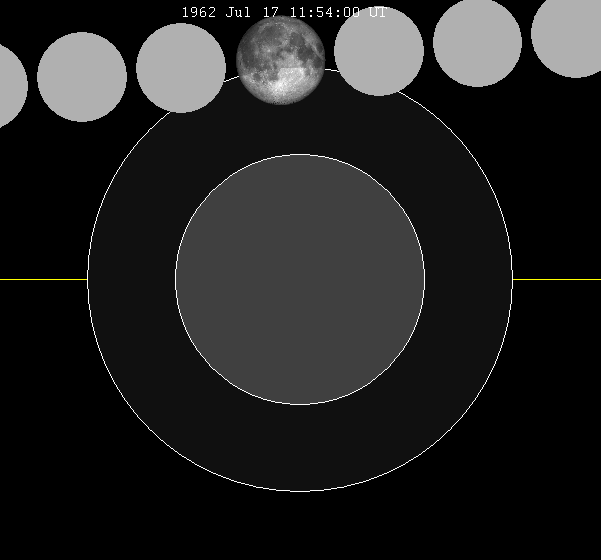

== Eclipse details ==
Shown below is a table displaying details about this particular solar eclipse. It describes various parameters pertaining to this eclipse.

July 17, 1962 Lunar Eclipse Parameters
Parameter	Value
Penumbral Magnitude	0.39245
Umbral Magnitude	−0.58347
Gamma	1.33712
Sun Right Ascension	07h45m18.8s
Sun Declination	+21°14'17.1"
Sun Semi-Diameter	15'44.2"
Sun Equatorial Horizontal Parallax	08.7"
Moon Right Ascension	19h44m51.2s
Moon Declination	-19°55'25.0"
Moon Semi-Diameter	16'07.5"
Moon Equatorial Horizontal Parallax	0°59'10.9"
ΔT	34.3 s

== Eclipse season ==
This eclipse is part of an eclipse season, a period, roughly every six months, when eclipses occur. Only two (or occasionally three) eclipse seasons occur each year, and each season lasts about 35 days and repeats just short of six months (173 days) later; thus two full eclipse seasons always occur each year. Either two or three eclipses happen each eclipse season. In the sequence below, each eclipse is separated by a fortnight. The first and last eclipse in this sequence is separated by one synodic month.

Eclipse season of July–August 1962
July 17 Descending node (full moon)	July 31 Ascending node (new moon)	August 15 Descending node (full moon)
Penumbral lunar eclipse Lunar Saros 109	Annular solar eclipse Solar Saros 135	Penumbral lunar eclipse Lunar Saros 147

== Related eclipses ==
=== Eclipses in 1962 ===
- A total solar eclipse on February 5.
- A penumbral lunar eclipse on February 19.
- A penumbral lunar eclipse on July 17.
- An annular solar eclipse on July 31.
- A penumbral lunar eclipse on August 15.

=== Metonic ===
- Followed by: Lunar eclipse of May 4, 1966

=== Tzolkinex ===
- Preceded by: Lunar eclipse of June 5, 1955
- Followed by: Lunar eclipse of August 27, 1969

=== Half-Saros ===
- Preceded by: Solar eclipse of July 11, 1953
- Followed by: Solar eclipse of July 22, 1971

=== Tritos ===
- Preceded by: Lunar eclipse of August 17, 1951
- Followed by: Lunar eclipse of June 15, 1973

=== Lunar Saros 109 ===
- Preceded by: Lunar eclipse of July 6, 1944
- Followed by: Lunar eclipse of July 27, 1980

=== Inex ===
- Preceded by: Lunar eclipse of August 5, 1933
- Followed by: Lunar eclipse of June 27, 1991

=== Triad ===
- Preceded by: Lunar eclipse of September 15, 1875
- Followed by: Lunar eclipse of May 17, 2049

=== Lunar eclipses of 1962–1965 ===
This eclipse is a member of a semester series. An eclipse in a semester series of lunar eclipses repeats approximately every 177 days and 4 hours (a semester) at alternating nodes of the Moon's orbit.

The penumbral lunar eclipses on February 19, 1962 and August 15, 1962 occur in the previous lunar year eclipse set.

Lunar eclipse series sets from 1962 to 1965
Descending node				Ascending node			
Saros	Date Viewing	Type Chart	Gamma	Saros	Date Viewing	Type Chart	Gamma
109	1962 Jul 17	Penumbral	1.3371	114	1963 Jan 09	Penumbral	−1.0128
119	1963 Jul 06	Partial	0.6197	124	1963 Dec 30	Total	−0.2889
129	1964 Jun 25	Total	−0.1461	134	1964 Dec 19	Total	0.3801
139	1965 Jun 14	Partial	−0.9006	144	1965 Dec 08	Penumbral	1.0775

=== Saros 109 ===
This eclipse is a part of Saros series 109, repeating every 18 years, 11 days, and containing 71 or 72 events (depending on the source). The series started with a penumbral lunar eclipse on June 27, 736 AD. It contains partial eclipses from September 22, 880 AD through April 16, 1223; total eclipses from April 27, 1241 through October 17, 1529; and a second set of partial eclipses from October 28, 1547 through May 22, 1872. The series ends at member 71 as a penumbral eclipse on August 8, 1998, though some sources count a possible penumbral eclipse on August 18, 2016 as the last eclipse of the series.

The longest duration of totality was produced by member 35 at 99 minutes, 45 seconds on July 1, 1349. All eclipses in this series occur at the Moon’s descending node of orbit.

Greatest	First			
The greatest eclipse of the series occurred on 1349 Jul 01, lasting 99 minutes, 45 seconds.	Penumbral	Partial	Total	Central
The greatest eclipse of the series occurred on 1349 Jul 01, lasting 99 minutes, 45 seconds.	736 Jun 27	880 Sep 22	1241 Apr 27	1295 May 30
The greatest eclipse of the series occurred on 1349 Jul 01, lasting 99 minutes, 45 seconds.	Last			
The greatest eclipse of the series occurred on 1349 Jul 01, lasting 99 minutes, 45 seconds.	Central	Total	Partial	Penumbral
The greatest eclipse of the series occurred on 1349 Jul 01, lasting 99 minutes, 45 seconds.	1421 Aug 13	1529 Oct 17	1872 May 22	1998 Aug 08

Eclipses are tabulated in three columns; every third eclipse in the same column is one exeligmos apart, so they all cast shadows over approximately the same parts of the Earth.

Series members 61–72 occur between 1801 and 2016:
61	62	63
1818 Apr 21	1836 May 01	1854 May 12
64	65	66
1872 May 22	1890 Jun 03	1908 Jun 14
67	68	69
1926 Jun 25	1944 Jul 06	1962 Jul 17
70	71	72
1980 Jul 27	1998 Aug 08	2016 Aug 18

=== Tritos series ===
This eclipse is a part of a tritos cycle, repeating at alternating nodes every 135 synodic months (≈ 3986.63 days, or 11 years minus 1 month). Their appearance and longitude are irregular due to a lack of synchronization with the anomalistic month (period of perigee), but groupings of 3 tritos cycles (≈ 33 years minus 3 months) come close (≈ 434.044 anomalistic months), so eclipses are similar in these groupings.

Series members between 1886 and 2200
1886 Feb 18 (Saros 102)	1897 Jan 18 (Saros 103)			
	1951 Aug 17 (Saros 108)	1962 Jul 17 (Saros 109)	1973 Jun 15 (Saros 110)	1984 May 15 (Saros 111)
1995 Apr 15 (Saros 112)	2006 Mar 14 (Saros 113)	2017 Feb 11 (Saros 114)	2028 Jan 12 (Saros 115)	2038 Dec 11 (Saros 116)
2049 Nov 09 (Saros 117)	2060 Oct 09 (Saros 118)	2071 Sep 09 (Saros 119)	2082 Aug 08 (Saros 120)	2093 Jul 08 (Saros 121)
2104 Jun 08 (Saros 122)	2115 May 08 (Saros 123)	2126 Apr 07 (Saros 124)	2137 Mar 07 (Saros 125)	2148 Feb 04 (Saros 126)
2159 Jan 04 (Saros 127)	2169 Dec 04 (Saros 128)	2180 Nov 02 (Saros 129)	2191 Oct 02 (Saros 130)	

=== Inex series ===
This eclipse is a part of the long period inex cycle, repeating at alternating nodes, every 358 synodic months (≈ 10,571.95 days, or 29 years minus 20 days). Their appearance and longitude are irregular due to a lack of synchronization with the anomalistic month (period of perigee). However, groupings of 3 inex cycles (≈ 87 years minus 2 months) comes close (≈ 1,151.02 anomalistic months), so eclipses are similar in these groupings.

Series members between 1846 and 2200
1846 Oct 04 (Saros 105)	1875 Sep 15 (Saros 106)	
1933 Aug 05 (Saros 108)	1962 Jul 17 (Saros 109)	1991 Jun 27 (Saros 110)
2020 Jun 05 (Saros 111)	2049 May 17 (Saros 112)	2078 Apr 27 (Saros 113)
2107 Apr 07 (Saros 114)	2136 Mar 18 (Saros 115)	2165 Feb 26 (Saros 116)
2194 Feb 05 (Saros 117)

=== Half-Saros cycle ===
A lunar eclipse will be preceded and followed by solar eclipses by 9 years and 5.5 days (a half saros). This lunar eclipse is related to two partial solar eclipses of Solar Saros 116.

July 11, 1953	July 22, 1971

== See also ==
- List of lunar eclipses
- List of 20th-century lunar eclipses
