= Lunar Saros 109 =

Lunar period useful for predicting eclipses

Saros cycle series 109 for lunar eclipses occurred at the moon's descending node, 18 years 11 and 1/3 days. It contained either 71 or 72 events, depending on multiple calculations.

== Summary ==
Lunar Saros series 109, repeating every 18 years and 11 days, had a total of 72 lunar eclipse events including 17 total lunar eclipses.

== List ==
Cat.	Saros	Mem	Date	Time UT (hr:mn)	Type	Gamma	Magnitude	Duration (min)			Contacts UT (hr:mn)						Chart
Cat.	Saros	Mem	Date	Greatest	Type	Gamma	Magnitude	Pen.	Par.	Tot.	P1	P4	U1	U2	U3	U4	Chart
06608	109	1	736 Jun 27	22:44:48	Penumbral	-1.4922	-0.9019	112.6			21:48:30	23:41:06					
06653	109	2	754 Jul 09	5:26:24	Penumbral	-1.4101	-0.7505	158.6			4:07:06	6:45:42					
06697	109	3	772 Jul 19	12:13:23	Penumbral	-1.3311	-0.6048	190.7			10:38:02	13:48:44					
06739	109	4	790 Jul 30	19:07:33	Penumbral	-1.2566	-0.4677	215.0			17:20:03	20:55:03					
06781	109	5	808 Aug 10	2:09:44	Penumbral	-1.1873	-0.3402	233.9			0:12:47	4:06:41					
06821	109	6	826 Aug 21	9:21:41	Penumbral	-1.1250	-0.2259	248.6			7:17:23	11:25:59					
06861	109	7	844 Aug 31	16:41:53	Penumbral	-1.0684	-0.1220	260.4			14:31:41	18:52:05					
06902	109	8	862 Sep 12	0:13:30	Penumbral	-1.0201	-0.0333	269.3			21:58:51	2:28:09					
06943	109	9	880 Sep 22	7:54:42	Partial	-0.9785	0.0430	276.2	48.6		5:36:36	10:12:48	7:30:24			8:19:00	
06985	109	10	898 Oct 03	15:47:13	Partial	-0.9452	0.1041	281.2	74.7		13:26:37	18:07:49	15:09:52			16:24:34	
07026	109	11	916 Oct 13	23:48:01	Partial	-0.9178	0.1546	284.8	90.1		21:25:37	2:10:25	23:02:58			0:33:04	
07066	109	12	934 Oct 25	7:58:55	Partial	-0.8978	0.1915	287.0	99.4		5:35:25	10:22:25	7:09:13			8:48:37	
07107	109	13	952 Nov 04	16:16:46	Partial	-0.8826	0.2199	288.4	105.8		13:52:34	18:40:58	15:23:52			17:09:40	
07147	109	14	970 Nov 16	0:41:26	Partial	-0.8722	0.2397	289.0	109.8		22:16:56	3:05:56	23:46:32			1:36:20	
07188	109	15	988 Nov 26	9:10:40	Partial	-0.8647	0.2543	289.0	112.5		6:46:10	11:35:10	8:14:25			10:06:55	
07232	109	16	1006 Dec 07	17:43:42	Partial	-0.8595	0.2651	288.6	114.4		15:19:24	20:08:00	16:46:30			18:40:54	
07277	109	17	1024 Dec 18	2:18:03	Partial	-0.8549	0.2750	288.1	116.0		23:54:00	4:42:06	1:20:03			3:16:03	
07321	109	18	1042 Dec 29	10:51:45	Partial	-0.8490	0.2877	287.7	118.1		8:27:54	13:15:36	9:52:42			11:50:48	
07366	109	19	1061 Jan 08	19:24:07	Partial	-0.8414	0.3038	287.5	120.7		17:00:22	21:47:52	18:23:46			20:24:28	
07410	109	20	1079 Jan 20	3:53:25	Partial	-0.8304	0.3263	287.7	124.4		1:29:34	6:17:16	2:51:13			4:55:37	
07456	109	21	1097 Jan 30	12:17:27	Partial	-0.8144	0.3581	288.5	129.3		9:53:12	14:41:42	11:12:48			13:22:06	
07502	109	22	1115 Feb 10	20:36:02	Partial	-0.7934	0.3994	289.9	135.4		18:11:05	23:00:59	19:28:20			21:43:44	
07548	109	23	1133 Feb 21	4:48:14	Partial	-0.7663	0.452	291.8	142.5		2:22:20	7:14:08	3:36:59			5:59:29	
07594	109	24	1151 Mar 4	12:54:24	Partial	-0.7334	0.5151	294.3	150.2		10:27:15	15:21:33	11:39:18			14:09:30	
07642	109	25	1169 Mar 14	20:52:04	Partial	-0.6927	0.5927	297.4	158.8		18:23:22	23:20:46	19:32:40			22:11:28	
07688	109	26	1187 Mar 26	4:44:00	Partial	-0.6465	0.6803	300.7	167.3		2:13:39	7:14:21	3:20:21			6:07:39	
07734	109	27	1205 Apr 05	12:28:31	Partial	-0.5935	0.7804	304.2	175.8		9:56:25	15:00:37	11:00:37			13:56:25	
07780	109	28	1223 Apr 16	20:07:47	Partial	-0.5354	0.8897	307.7	183.8		17:33:56	22:41:38	18:35:53			21:39:41	
07826	109	29	1241 Apr 27	3:40:38	Total	-0.4710	1.0102	311.1	191.2	15.3	1:05:05	6:16:11	2:05:02	3:32:59	3:48:17	5:16:14	
07871	109	30	1259 May 08	11:10:18	Total	-0.4034	1.1365	314.1	197.6	53.8	8:33:15	13:47:21	9:31:30	10:43:24	11:37:12	12:49:06	
07916	109	31	1277 May 18	18:36:13	Total	-0.3321	1.2691	316.6	203.1	72.3	15:57:55	21:14:31	16:54:40	18:00:04	19:12:22	20:17:46	
07961	109	32	1295 May 30	1:59:34	Total	-0.2580	1.4067	318.6	207.4	84.6	23:20:16	4:38:52	0:15:52	1:17:16	2:41:52	3:43:16	
08006	109	33	1313 Jun 09	9:22:06	Total	-0.1828	1.5459	319.9	210.5	92.7	6:42:09	12:02:03	7:36:51	8:35:45	10:08:27	11:07:21	
08049	109	34	1331 Jun 20	16:44:34	Total	-0.1072	1.6856	320.6	212.4	97.6	14:04:16	19:24:52	14:58:22	15:55:46	17:33:22	18:30:46	
08090	109	35	1349 Jul 01	0:09:20	Total	-0.0330	1.8225	320.6	213.1	99.8	21:29:02	2:49:38	22:22:47	23:19:26	0:59:14	1:55:53	
08131	109	36	1367 Jul 12	7:35:23	Total	0.0404	1.8092	319.9	212.7	99.5	4:55:26	10:15:20	5:49:02	6:45:38	8:25:08	9:21:44	
08172	109	37	1385 Jul 22	15:06:49	Total	0.1096	1.6824	318.7	211.3	97.1	12:27:28	17:46:10	13:21:10	14:18:16	15:55:22	16:52:28	
08213	109	38	1403 Aug 02	22:42:18	Total	0.1755	1.5612	317.1	209.1	92.7	20:03:45	1:20:51	20:57:45	21:55:57	23:28:39	0:26:51	
08254	109	39	1421 Aug 13	6:24:23	Total	0.2363	1.4492	315.1	206.2	86.6	3:46:50	9:01:56	4:41:17	5:41:05	7:07:41	8:07:29	
08296	109	40	1439 Aug 24	14:12:06	Total	0.2925	1.3451	312.9	202.9	78.7	11:35:39	16:48:33	12:30:39	13:32:45	14:51:27	15:53:33	
08337	109	41	1457 Sep 03	22:08:21	Total	0.3420	1.2534	310.6	199.3	69.5	19:33:03	0:43:39	20:28:42	21:33:36	22:43:06	23:48:00	
08378	109	42	1475 Sep 15	6:11:44	Total	0.3855	1.1726	308.5	195.7	58.8	3:37:29	8:45:59	4:33:53	5:42:20	6:41:08	7:49:35	
08418	109	43	1493 Sep 25	14:23:01	Total	0.4226	1.1033	306.4	192.2	46.4	11:49:49	16:56:13	12:46:55	13:59:49	14:46:13	15:59:07	
08458	109	44	1511 Oct 06	22:42:06	Total	0.4533	1.0457	304.7	189.0	31.4	20:09:45	1:14:27	21:07:36	22:26:24	22:57:48	0:16:36	
08499	109	45	1529 Oct 17	7:09:32	Total	0.4775	1.0001	303.3	186.3	1.7	4:37:53	9:41:11	5:36:23	7:08:41	7:10:23	8:42:41	
08540	109	46	1547 Oct 28	15:43:40	Partial	0.4960	0.9651	302.2	184.2		13:12:34	18:14:46	14:11:34			17:15:46	
08584	109	47	1565 Nov 08	0:23:49	Partial	0.5096	0.9391	301.4	182.5		21:53:07	2:54:31	22:52:34			1:55:04	
08627	109	48	1583 Nov 29	9:08:53	Partial	0.5191	0.9208	301.0	181.3		6:38:23	11:39:23	7:38:14			10:39:32	
08670	109	49	1601 Dec 09	17:58:33	Partial	0.5249	0.9092	300.8	180.6		15:28:09	20:28:57	16:28:15			19:28:51	
08715	109	50	1619 Dec 21	2:49:28	Partial	0.5298	0.8997	300.7	180.0		0:19:07	5:19:49	1:19:28			4:19:28	
08759	109	51	1637 Dec 31	11:42:25	Partial	0.5331	0.8934	300.7	179.7		9:12:04	14:12:46	10:12:34			13:12:16	
08803	109	52	1656 Jan 11	20:33:34	Partial	0.5380	0.8843	300.5	179.2		18:03:19	23:03:49	19:03:58			22:03:10	
08848	109	53	1674 Jan 22	5:23:56	Partial	0.5433	0.8745	300.4	178.6		2:53:44	7:54:08	3:54:38			6:53:14	
08894	109	54	1692 Feb 02	14:08:39	Partial	0.5536	0.8560	299.8	177.5		11:38:45	16:38:33	12:39:54			15:37:24	
08941	109	55	1710 Feb 13	22:50:15	Partial	0.5663	0.8330	299.1	176.0		20:20:42	1:19:48	21:22:15			0:18:15	
08988	109	56	1728 Feb 25	7:24:24	Partial	0.5855	0.7984	297.8	173.5		4:55:30	9:53:18	5:57:39			8:51:09	
09034	109	57	1746 Mar 07	15:52:17	Partial	0.6096	0.7548	296.0	170.2		13:24:17	18:20:17	14:27:11			17:17:23	
09081	109	58	1764 Mar 18	0:11:05	Partial	0.6410	0.6976	293.5	165.5		21:44:20	2:37:50	22:48:20			1:33:50	
09126	109	59	1782 Mar 29	8:23:07	Partial	0.6778	0.6307	290.3	159.4		5:57:58	10:48:16	7:03:25			9:42:49	
09171	109	60	1800 Apr 09	16:26:01	Partial	0.7221	0.5500	286.0	151.0		14:03:01	18:49:01	15:10:31			17:41:31	
09216	109	61	1818 Apr 21	0:20:29	Partial	0.7728	0.4572	280.7	140.0		22:00:08	2:40:50	23:10:29			1:30:29	
09262	109	62	1836 May 01	8:06:48	Partial	0.8299	0.3528	274.0	125.2		5:49:48	10:23:48	7:04:12			9:09:24	
09308	109	63	1854 May 12	15:46:09	Partial	0.8919	0.2389	266.0	105.0		13:33:09	17:59:09	14:53:39			16:38:39	
09352	109	64	1872 May 22	23:18:24	Partial	0.9592	0.1151	256.1	74.3		21:10:21	1:26:27	22:41:15			23:55:33	
09395	109	65	1890 Jun 03	6:44:42	Penumbral	1.0309	-0.0168	244.1			4:42:39	8:46:45					
09438	109	66	1908 Jun 14	14:06:32	Penumbral	1.1053	-0.1541	229.9			12:11:35	16:01:29					
09480	109	67	1926 Jun 25	21:25:07	Penumbral	1.1814	-0.2948	213.1			19:38:34	23:11:40					
09522	109	68	1944 Jul 06	4:40:01	Penumbral	1.2596	-0.4398	192.7			3:03:40	6:16:22					
09563	109	69	1962 Jul 17	11:54:49	Penumbral	1.3370	-0.5835	168.3			10:30:40	13:18:58					
09604	109	70	1980 Jul 27	19:08:59	Penumbral	1.4138	-0.7264	137.5			18:00:14	20:17:44					
09645	109	71	1998 Aug 08	2:25:57	Penumbral	1.4875	-0.8637	96.4			1:37:45	3:14:09					
	109	72	2016 Aug 18	9:42:57	Penumbral/Miss	1.503	-0.9216	33.14			9:25:45	9:58:59					

== See also ==
- List of lunar eclipses
  - List of Saros series for lunar eclipses
