= Solar eclipse of August 10, 1980 =

20th-century annular solar eclipse

- Annular eclipse
- Map
- Gamma: −0.1915
- Magnitude: 0.9727

Maximum eclipse
- Duration: 203 s (3 min 23 s)
- Coordinates: 4.6°N 108.9°W
- Max. width of band: 100 km (62 mi)

Times (UTC)
- Greatest eclipse: 19:12:21

References
- Saros: 135 (37 of 71)
- Catalog # (SE5000): 9465

An annular solar eclipse occurred at the Moon's ascending node of orbit on Sunday, August 10, 1980, with a magnitude of 0.9727. A solar eclipse occurs when the Moon passes between Earth and the Sun, thereby totally or partly obscuring the image of the Sun for a viewer on Earth. An annular solar eclipse occurs when the Moon's apparent diameter is smaller than the Sun's, blocking most of the Sun's light and causing the Sun to look like an annulus (ring). An annular eclipse appears as a partial eclipse over a region of the Earth thousands of kilometres wide. Occurring about 5 days before apogee (on August 15, 1980, at 19:00 UTC), the Moon's apparent diameter was smaller.

Annularity was visible in Tabuaeran of Kiribati, Peru, Bolivia, northern Paraguay and Brazil. The whole path of annularity was east of the 180th meridian, seeing the eclipse on August 10. (However, time zone of the Line Islands including Tabuaeran was changed from UTC−10 to UTC+14 in 1995. The date of the eclipse would be August 11 if observing the present day's time zone.)

A partial eclipse was visible for parts of eastern Oceania, Hawaii, the southern United States, Mexico, Central America, the Caribbean, and South America. Most of these areas are east of the 180th meridian, seeing the eclipse on August 10, while very few islands in the Pacific Ocean are west of the 180th meridian, seeing the eclipse on August 11.

== Eclipse details ==
Shown below are two tables displaying details about this particular solar eclipse. The first table outlines times at which the Moon's penumbra or umbra attains the specific parameter, and the second table describes various other parameters pertaining to this eclipse.

August 10, 1980 Solar Eclipse Times
Event	Time (UTC)
First Penumbral External Contact	1980 August 10 at 16:14:41.9 UTC
First Umbral External Contact	1980 August 10 at 17:18:11.1 UTC
First Central Line	1980 August 10 at 17:19:35.0 UTC
First Umbral Internal Contact	1980 August 10 at 17:20:59.0 UTC
First Penumbral Internal Contact	1980 August 10 at 18:26:38.7 UTC
Greatest Duration	1980 August 10 at 19:04:16.8 UTC
Ecliptic Conjunction	1980 August 10 at 19:10:08.9 UTC
Greatest Eclipse	1980 August 10 at 19:12:21.1 UTC
Equatorial Conjunction	1980 August 10 at 19:17:07.0 UTC
Last Penumbral Internal Contact	1980 August 10 at 19:57:54.5 UTC
Last Umbral Internal Contact	1980 August 10 at 21:03:37.7 UTC
Last Central Line	1980 August 10 at 21:05:04.4 UTC
Last Umbral External Contact	1980 August 10 at 21:06:31.0 UTC
Last Penumbral External Contact	1980 August 10 at 22:10:03.9 UTC

August 10, 1980 Solar Eclipse Parameters
Parameter	Value
Eclipse Magnitude	0.97267
Eclipse Obscuration	0.94609
Gamma	−0.19154
Sun Right Ascension	09h22m51.8s
Sun Declination	+15°21'02.2"
Sun Semi-Diameter	15'46.9"
Sun Equatorial Horizontal Parallax	08.7"
Moon Right Ascension	09h22m42.5s
Moon Declination	+15°10'40.6"
Moon Semi-Diameter	15'07.1"
Moon Equatorial Horizontal Parallax	0°55'29.1"
ΔT	51.0 s

== Eclipse season ==
This eclipse is part of an eclipse season, a period, roughly every six months, when eclipses occur. Only two (or occasionally three) eclipse seasons occur each year, and each season lasts about 35 days and repeats just short of six months (173 days) later; thus two full eclipse seasons always occur each year. Either two or three eclipses happen each eclipse season. In the sequence below, each eclipse is separated by a fortnight. The first and last eclipse in this sequence is separated by one synodic month.

Eclipse season of July–August 1980
July 27 Descending node (full moon)	August 10 Ascending node (new moon)	August 26 Descending node (full moon)
Penumbral lunar eclipse Lunar Saros 109	Annular solar eclipse Solar Saros 135	Penumbral lunar eclipse Lunar Saros 147

== Related eclipses ==
=== Eclipses in 1980 ===
- A total solar eclipse on February 16.
- A penumbral lunar eclipse on March 1.
- A penumbral lunar eclipse on July 27.
- An annular solar eclipse on August 10.
- A penumbral lunar eclipse on August 26.

=== Metonic ===
- Preceded by: Solar eclipse of October 23, 1976
- Followed by: Solar eclipse of May 30, 1984

=== Tzolkinex ===
- Preceded by: Solar eclipse of June 30, 1973
- Followed by: Solar eclipse of September 23, 1987

=== Half-Saros ===
- Preceded by: Lunar eclipse of August 6, 1971
- Followed by: Lunar eclipse of August 16, 1989

=== Tritos ===
- Preceded by: Solar eclipse of September 11, 1969
- Followed by: Solar eclipse of July 11, 1991

=== Solar Saros 135 ===
- Preceded by: Solar eclipse of July 31, 1962
- Followed by: Solar eclipse of August 22, 1998

=== Inex ===
- Preceded by: Solar eclipse of September 1, 1951
- Followed by: Solar eclipse of July 22, 2009

=== Triad ===
- Preceded by: Solar eclipse of October 9, 1893
- Followed by: Solar eclipse of June 11, 2067

=== Solar eclipses of 1979–1982 ===
This eclipse is a member of a semester series. An eclipse in a semester series of solar eclipses repeats approximately every 177 days and 4 hours (a semester) at alternating nodes of the Moon's orbit.

The partial solar eclipses on June 21, 1982 and December 15, 1982 occur in the next lunar year eclipse set.

Solar eclipse series sets from 1979 to 1982
Descending node			Ascending node		
Saros	Map	Gamma	Saros	Map	Gamma
120 Totality in Brandon, MB, Canada	February 26, 1979 Total	0.8981	125	August 22, 1979 Annular	−0.9632
130	February 16, 1980 Total	0.2224	135	August 10, 1980 Annular	−0.1915
140	February 4, 1981 Annular	−0.4838	145	July 31, 1981 Total	0.5792
150	January 25, 1982 Partial	−1.2311	155	July 20, 1982 Partial	1.2886

=== Saros 135 ===
This eclipse is a part of Saros series 135, repeating every 18 years, 11 days, and containing 71 events. The series started with a partial solar eclipse on July 5, 1331. It contains annular eclipses from October 21, 1511 through February 24, 2305; hybrid eclipses on March 8, 2323 and March 18, 2341; and total eclipses from March 29, 2359 through May 22, 2449. The series ends at member 71 as a partial eclipse on August 17, 2593. Its eclipses are tabulated in three columns; every third eclipse in the same column is one exeligmos apart, so they all cast shadows over approximately the same parts of the Earth.

The longest duration of annularity was produced by member 16 at 10 minutes, 41 seconds on December 24, 1601, and the longest duration of totality will be produced by member 62 at 2 minutes, 27 seconds on May 12, 2431. All eclipses in this series occur at the Moon’s ascending node of orbit.

Series members 28–49 occur between 1801 and 2200:
28	29	30
May 5, 1818	May 15, 1836	May 26, 1854
31	32	33
June 6, 1872	June 17, 1890	June 28, 1908
34	35	36
July 9, 1926	July 20, 1944	July 31, 1962
37	38	39
August 10, 1980	August 22, 1998	September 1, 2016
40	42	42
September 12, 2034	September 22, 2052	October 4, 2070
43	44	45
October 14, 2088	October 26, 2106	November 6, 2124
46	47	48
November 17, 2142	November 27, 2160	December 9, 2178
49
December 19, 2196

=== Metonic series ===
The metonic series repeats eclipses every 19 years (6939.69 days), lasting about 5 cycles. Eclipses occur in nearly the same calendar date. In addition, the octon subseries repeats 1/5 of that or every 3.8 years (1387.94 days). All eclipses in this table occur at the Moon's ascending node.

22 eclipse events between January 5, 1935 and August 11, 2018
January 4–5	October 23–24	August 10–12	May 30–31	March 18–19
111	113	115	117	119
January 5, 1935		August 12, 1942	May 30, 1946	March 18, 1950
121	123	125	127	129
January 5, 1954	October 23, 1957	August 11, 1961	May 30, 1965	March 18, 1969
131	133	135	137	139
January 4, 1973	October 23, 1976	August 10, 1980	May 30, 1984	March 18, 1988
141	143	145	147	149
January 4, 1992	October 24, 1995	August 11, 1999	May 31, 2003	March 19, 2007
151	153	155		
January 4, 2011	October 23, 2014	August 11, 2018		

=== Tritos series ===
This eclipse is a part of a tritos cycle, repeating at alternating nodes every 135 synodic months (≈ 3986.63 days, or 11 years minus 1 month). Their appearance and longitude are irregular due to a lack of synchronization with the anomalistic month (period of perigee), but groupings of 3 tritos cycles (≈ 33 years minus 3 months) come close (≈ 434.044 anomalistic months), so eclipses are similar in these groupings.

Series members between 1801 and 2200
December 21, 1805 (Saros 119)	November 19, 1816 (Saros 120)	October 20, 1827 (Saros 121)	September 18, 1838 (Saros 122)	August 18, 1849 (Saros 123)
July 18, 1860 (Saros 124)	June 18, 1871 (Saros 125)	May 17, 1882 (Saros 126)	April 16, 1893 (Saros 127)	March 17, 1904 (Saros 128)
February 14, 1915 (Saros 129)	January 14, 1926 (Saros 130)	December 13, 1936 (Saros 131)	November 12, 1947 (Saros 132)	October 12, 1958 (Saros 133)
September 11, 1969 (Saros 134)	August 10, 1980 (Saros 135)	July 11, 1991 (Saros 136)	June 10, 2002 (Saros 137)	May 10, 2013 (Saros 138)
April 8, 2024 (Saros 139)	March 9, 2035 (Saros 140)	February 5, 2046 (Saros 141)	January 5, 2057 (Saros 142)	December 6, 2067 (Saros 143)
November 4, 2078 (Saros 144)	October 4, 2089 (Saros 145)	September 4, 2100 (Saros 146)	August 4, 2111 (Saros 147)	July 4, 2122 (Saros 148)
June 3, 2133 (Saros 149)	May 3, 2144 (Saros 150)	April 2, 2155 (Saros 151)	March 2, 2166 (Saros 152)	January 29, 2177 (Saros 153)
December 29, 2187 (Saros 154)	November 28, 2198 (Saros 155)			

=== Inex series ===
This eclipse is a part of the long period inex cycle, repeating at alternating nodes, every 358 synodic months (≈ 10,571.95 days, or 29 years minus 20 days). Their appearance and longitude are irregular due to a lack of synchronization with the anomalistic month (period of perigee). However, groupings of 3 inex cycles (≈ 87 years minus 2 months) comes close (≈ 1,151.02 anomalistic months), so eclipses are similar in these groupings.

Series members between 1801 and 2200
December 10, 1806 (Saros 129)	November 20, 1835 (Saros 130)	October 30, 1864 (Saros 131)
October 9, 1893 (Saros 132)	September 21, 1922 (Saros 133)	September 1, 1951 (Saros 134)
August 10, 1980 (Saros 135)	July 22, 2009 (Saros 136)	July 2, 2038 (Saros 137)
June 11, 2067 (Saros 138)	May 22, 2096 (Saros 139)	May 3, 2125 (Saros 140)
April 12, 2154 (Saros 141)	March 23, 2183 (Saros 142)	
