= Solar eclipse of January 3, 1946 =

20th-century partial solar eclipse

- Partial eclipse
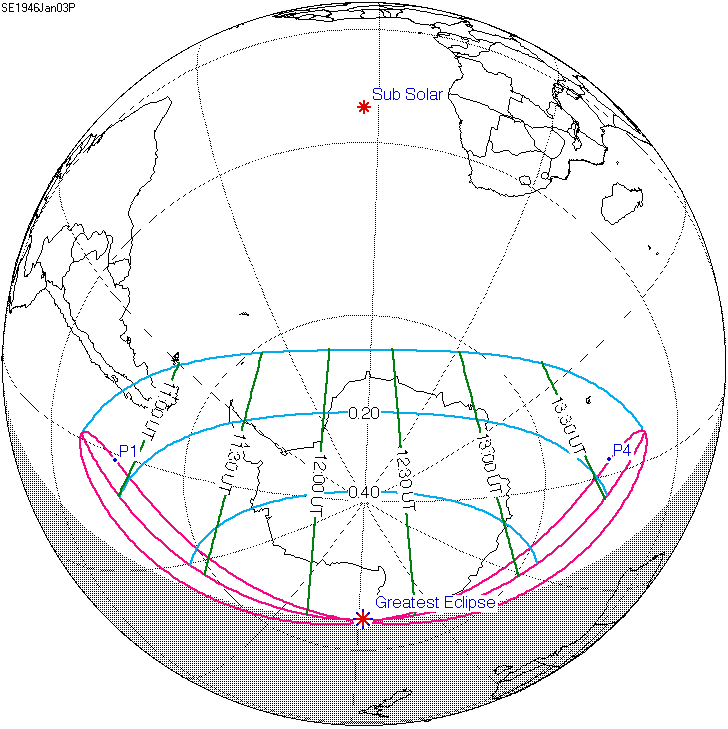
- Map
- Gamma: −1.2392
- Magnitude: 0.5529

Maximum eclipse
- Coordinates: 67.1°S 177.6°E

Times (UTC)
- Greatest eclipse: 12:16:11

References
- Saros: 150 (13 of 71)
- Catalog # (SE5000): 9388

A partial solar eclipse occurred at the Moon's descending node of orbit on Thursday, January 3, 1946, with a magnitude of 0.5529. A solar eclipse occurs when the Moon passes between Earth and the Sun, thereby totally or partly obscuring the image of the Sun for a viewer on Earth. A partial solar eclipse occurs in the polar regions of the Earth when the center of the Moon's shadow misses the Earth.

This was the first of four partial solar eclipses in 1946, with the others occurring on May 30, June 29, and November 23.

A partial eclipse was visible for parts of Antarctica and extreme southern South America.

== Eclipse details ==
Shown below are two tables displaying details about this particular solar eclipse. The first table outlines times at which the Moon's penumbra or umbra attains the specific parameter, and the second table describes various other parameters pertaining to this eclipse.

January 3, 1946 Solar Eclipse Times
Event	Time (UTC)
First Penumbral External Contact	1946 January 3 at 10:25:50.6 UTC
Greatest Eclipse	1946 January 3 at 12:16:10.7 UTC
Equatorial Conjunction	1946 January 3 at 12:16:37.9 UTC
Ecliptic Conjunction	1946 January 3 at 12:30:05.5 UTC
Last Penumbral External Contact	1946 January 3 at 14:06:25.7 UTC

January 3, 1946 Solar Eclipse Parameters
Parameter	Value
Eclipse Magnitude	0.55294
Eclipse Obscuration	0.43993
Gamma	−1.23918
Sun Right Ascension	18h54m29.6s
Sun Declination	-22°51'18.5"
Sun Semi-Diameter	16'15.9"
Sun Equatorial Horizontal Parallax	08.9"
Moon Right Ascension	18h54m28.6s
Moon Declination	-23°59'55.4"
Moon Semi-Diameter	15'07.7"
Moon Equatorial Horizontal Parallax	0°55'31.2"
ΔT	27.3 s

== Eclipse season ==
This eclipse is part of an eclipse season, a period, roughly every six months, when eclipses occur. Only two (or occasionally three) eclipse seasons occur each year, and each season lasts about 35 days and repeats just short of six months (173 days) later; thus two full eclipse seasons always occur each year. Either two or three eclipses happen each eclipse season. In the sequence below, each eclipse is separated by a fortnight.

Eclipse season of December 1945–January 1946
December 19 Ascending node (full moon)	January 3 Descending node (new moon)
Total lunar eclipse Lunar Saros 124	Partial solar eclipse Solar Saros 150

== Related eclipses ==
=== Eclipses in 1946 ===
- A partial solar eclipse on January 3.
- A partial solar eclipse on May 30.
- A total lunar eclipse on June 14.
- A partial solar eclipse on June 29.
- A partial solar eclipse on November 23.
- A total lunar eclipse on December 8.

=== Metonic ===
- Preceded by: Solar eclipse of March 16, 1942
- Followed by: Solar eclipse of October 21, 1949

=== Tzolkinex ===
- Preceded by: Solar eclipse of November 21, 1938
- Followed by: Solar eclipse of February 14, 1953

=== Half-Saros ===
- Preceded by: Lunar eclipse of December 28, 1936
- Followed by: Lunar eclipse of January 8, 1955

=== Tritos ===
- Preceded by: Solar eclipse of February 3, 1935
- Followed by: Solar eclipse of December 2, 1956

=== Solar Saros 150 ===
- Preceded by: Solar eclipse of December 24, 1927
- Followed by: Solar eclipse of January 14, 1964

=== Inex ===
- Preceded by: Solar eclipse of January 23, 1917
- Followed by: Solar eclipse of December 13, 1974

=== Triad ===
- Preceded by: Solar eclipse of March 4, 1859
- Followed by: Solar eclipse of November 3, 2032

=== Solar eclipses of 1942–1946 ===
This eclipse is a member of a semester series. An eclipse in a semester series of solar eclipses repeats approximately every 177 days and 4 hours (a semester) at alternating nodes of the Moon's orbit.

The partial solar eclipses on March 16, 1942 and September 10, 1942 occur in the previous lunar year eclipse set, and the partial solar eclipses on May 30, 1946 and November 23, 1946 occur in the next lunar year eclipse set.

Solar eclipse series sets from 1942 to 1946
Ascending node			Descending node		
Saros	Map	Gamma	Saros	Map	Gamma
115	August 12, 1942 Partial	−1.5244	120	February 4, 1943 Total	0.8734
125	August 1, 1943 Annular	−0.8041	130	January 25, 1944 Total	0.2025
135	July 20, 1944 Annular	−0.0314	140	January 14, 1945 Annular	−0.4937
145	July 9, 1945 Total	0.7356	150	January 3, 1946 Partial	−1.2392
155	June 29, 1946 Partial	1.4361			

=== Saros 150 ===
This eclipse is a part of Saros series 150, repeating every 18 years, 11 days, and containing 71 events. The series started with a partial solar eclipse on August 24, 1729. It contains annular eclipses from April 22, 2126 through June 22, 2829. There are no hybrid or total eclipses in this set. The series ends at member 71 as a partial eclipse on September 29, 2991. Its eclipses are tabulated in three columns; every third eclipse in the same column is one exeligmos apart, so they all cast shadows over approximately the same parts of the Earth.

The longest duration of annularity will be produced by member 45 at 9 minutes, 58 seconds on December 19, 2522. All eclipses in this series occur at the Moon’s descending node of orbit.

Series members 5–27 occur between 1801 and 2200:
5	6	7
October 7, 1801	October 19, 1819	October 29, 1837
8	9	10
November 9, 1855	November 20, 1873	December 1, 1891
11	12	13
December 12, 1909	December 24, 1927	January 3, 1946
14	15	16
January 14, 1964	January 25, 1982	February 5, 2000
17	18	19
February 15, 2018	February 27, 2036	March 9, 2054
20	21	22
March 19, 2072	March 31, 2090	April 11, 2108
23	24	25
April 22, 2126	May 3, 2144	May 14, 2162
26	27	
May 24, 2180	June 4, 2198	

=== Metonic series ===
The metonic series repeats eclipses every 19 years (6939.69 days), lasting about 5 cycles. Eclipses occur in nearly the same calendar date. In addition, the octon subseries repeats 1/5 of that or every 3.8 years (1387.94 days). All eclipses in this table occur at the Moon's descending node.

22 eclipse events between March 16, 1866 and August 9, 1953
March 16–17	January 1–3	October 20–22	August 9–10	May 27–29
108	110	112	114	116
March 16, 1866			August 9, 1877	May 27, 1881
118	120	122	124	126
March 16, 1885	January 1, 1889	October 20, 1892	August 9, 1896	May 28, 1900
128	130	132	134	136
March 17, 1904	January 3, 1908	October 22, 1911	August 10, 1915	May 29, 1919
138	140	142	144	146
March 17, 1923	January 3, 1927	October 21, 1930	August 10, 1934	May 29, 1938
148	150	152	154	
March 16, 1942	January 3, 1946	October 21, 1949	August 9, 1953	

=== Tritos series ===
This eclipse is a part of a tritos cycle, repeating at alternating nodes every 135 synodic months (≈ 3986.63 days, or 11 years minus 1 month). Their appearance and longitude are irregular due to a lack of synchronization with the anomalistic month (period of perigee), but groupings of 3 tritos cycles (≈ 33 years minus 3 months) come close (≈ 434.044 anomalistic months), so eclipses are similar in these groupings.

The partial solar eclipse on October 24, 2098 (part of Saros 164) is also a part of this series but is not included in the table below.

Series members between 1801 and 2011
February 11, 1804 (Saros 137)	January 10, 1815 (Saros 138)	December 9, 1825 (Saros 139)	November 9, 1836 (Saros 140)	October 9, 1847 (Saros 141)
September 7, 1858 (Saros 142)	August 7, 1869 (Saros 143)	July 7, 1880 (Saros 144)	June 6, 1891 (Saros 145)	May 7, 1902 (Saros 146)
April 6, 1913 (Saros 147)	March 5, 1924 (Saros 148)	February 3, 1935 (Saros 149)	January 3, 1946 (Saros 150)	December 2, 1956 (Saros 151)
November 2, 1967 (Saros 152)	October 2, 1978 (Saros 153)	August 31, 1989 (Saros 154)	July 31, 2000 (Saros 155)	July 1, 2011 (Saros 156)

=== Inex series ===
This eclipse is a part of the long period inex cycle, repeating at alternating nodes, every 358 synodic months (≈ 10,571.95 days, or 29 years minus 20 days). Their appearance and longitude are irregular due to a lack of synchronization with the anomalistic month (period of perigee). However, groupings of 3 inex cycles (≈ 87 years minus 2 months) comes close (≈ 1,151.02 anomalistic months), so eclipses are similar in these groupings.

Series members between 1801 and 2200
April 13, 1801 (Saros 145)	March 24, 1830 (Saros 146)	March 4, 1859 (Saros 147)
February 11, 1888 (Saros 148)	January 23, 1917 (Saros 149)	January 3, 1946 (Saros 150)
December 13, 1974 (Saros 151)	November 23, 2003 (Saros 152)	November 3, 2032 (Saros 153)
October 13, 2061 (Saros 154)	September 23, 2090 (Saros 155)	September 5, 2119 (Saros 156)
August 14, 2148 (Saros 157)	July 25, 2177 (Saros 158)	
