= Solar eclipse of December 3, 1918 =

20th-century annular solar eclipse

- Annular eclipse
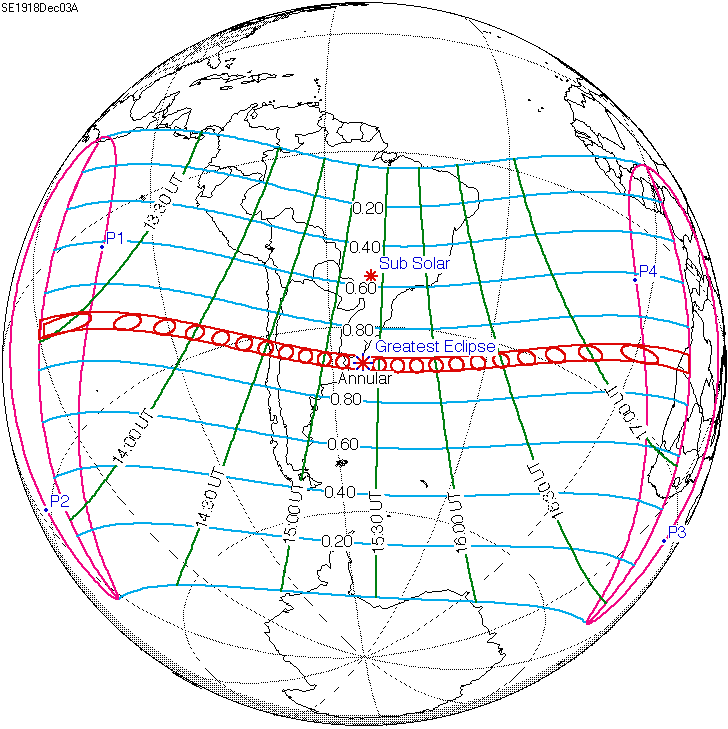
- Map
- Gamma: −0.2387
- Magnitude: 0.9383

Maximum eclipse
- Duration: 426 s (7 min 6 s)
- Coordinates: 36.1°S 53.7°W
- Max. width of band: 236 km (147 mi)

Times (UTC)
- Greatest eclipse: 15:22:02

References
- Saros: 131 (45 of 70)
- Catalog # (SE5000): 9325

An annular solar eclipse occurred at the Moon's ascending node of orbit on Tuesday, December 3, 1918, with a magnitude of 0.9383. A solar eclipse occurs when the Moon passes between Earth and the Sun, thereby totally or partly obscuring the image of the Sun for a viewer on Earth. An annular solar eclipse occurs when the Moon's apparent diameter is smaller than the Sun's, blocking most of the Sun's light and causing the Sun to look like an annulus (ring). An annular eclipse appears as a partial eclipse over a region of the Earth thousands of kilometres wide. Occurring 4.3 days after apogee (on November 29, 1918, at 7:10 UTC), the Moon's apparent diameter was smaller.

Annularity was visible from Chile including the capital city Santiago, Argentina including capital Buenos Aires, southern Uruguay including capital Montevideo, northeastern tip of South West Africa (today's Namibia) and southwestern Portuguese Angola (today's Angola). Aconcagua, the highest mountain outside Asia, also lies in the path of annularity. A partial eclipse was visible for parts of South America, Antarctica, Southern Africa, and Central Africa.

== Eclipse details ==
Shown below are two tables displaying details about this particular solar eclipse. The first table outlines times at which the Moon's penumbra or umbra attains the specific parameter, and the second table describes various other parameters pertaining to this eclipse.

December 3, 1918 Solar Eclipse Times
Event	Time (UTC)
First Penumbral External Contact	1918 December 03 at 12:21:26.8 UTC
First Umbral External Contact	1918 December 03 at 13:26:14.8 UTC
First Central Line	1918 December 03 at 13:28:57.9 UTC
First Umbral Internal Contact	1918 December 03 at 13:31:41.2 UTC
First Penumbral Internal Contact	1918 December 03 at 14:40:20.1 UTC
Ecliptic Conjunction	1918 December 03 at 15:19:13.2 UTC
Greatest Eclipse	1918 December 03 at 15:22:01.5 UTC
Greatest Duration	1918 December 03 at 15:22:11.4 UTC
Equatorial Conjunction	1918 December 03 at 15:23:11.5 UTC
Last Penumbral Internal Contact	1918 December 03 at 16:03:41.9 UTC
Last Umbral Internal Contact	1918 December 03 at 17:12:22.6 UTC
Last Central Line	1918 December 03 at 17:15:03.6 UTC
Last Umbral External Contact	1918 December 03 at 17:17:44.3 UTC
Last Penumbral External Contact	1918 December 03 at 18:22:30.4 UTC

December 3, 1918 Solar Eclipse Parameters
Parameter	Value
Eclipse Magnitude	0.93826
Eclipse Obscuration	0.88034
Gamma	−0.23873
Sun Right Ascension	16h36m17.1s
Sun Declination	-22°03'17.1"
Sun Semi-Diameter	16'13.6"
Sun Equatorial Horizontal Parallax	08.9"
Moon Right Ascension	16h36m14.8s
Moon Declination	-22°16'22.8"
Moon Semi-Diameter	15'00.0"
Moon Equatorial Horizontal Parallax	0°55'03.1"
ΔT	20.9 s

== Eclipse season ==
This eclipse is part of an eclipse season, a period, roughly every six months, when eclipses occur. Only two (or occasionally three) eclipse seasons occur each year, and each season lasts about 35 days and repeats just short of six months (173 days) later; thus two full eclipse seasons always occur each year. Either two or three eclipses happen each eclipse season. In the sequence below, each eclipse is separated by a fortnight.

Eclipse season of December 1918
December 3 Ascending node (new moon)	December 17 Descending node (full moon)
Annular solar eclipse Solar Saros 131	Penumbral lunar eclipse Lunar Saros 143

== Related eclipses ==
=== Eclipses in 1918 ===
- A total solar eclipse on June 8.
- A partial lunar eclipse on June 24.
- An annular solar eclipse on December 3.
- A penumbral lunar eclipse on December 17.

=== Metonic ===
- Preceded by: Solar eclipse of February 14, 1915
- Followed by: Solar eclipse of September 21, 1922

=== Tzolkinex ===
- Preceded by: Solar eclipse of October 22, 1911
- Followed by: Solar eclipse of January 14, 1926

=== Half-Saros ===
- Preceded by: Lunar eclipse of November 27, 1909
- Followed by: Lunar eclipse of December 8, 1927

=== Tritos ===
- Preceded by: Solar eclipse of January 3, 1908
- Followed by: Solar eclipse of November 1, 1929

=== Solar Saros 131 ===
- Preceded by: Solar eclipse of November 22, 1900
- Followed by: Solar eclipse of December 13, 1936

=== Inex ===
- Preceded by: Solar eclipse of December 22, 1889
- Followed by: Solar eclipse of November 12, 1947

=== Triad ===
- Preceded by: Solar eclipse of February 1, 1832
- Followed by: Solar eclipse of October 3, 2005

=== Solar eclipses of 1916–1920 ===
This eclipse is a member of a semester series. An eclipse in a semester series of solar eclipses repeats approximately every 177 days and 4 hours (a semester) at alternating nodes of the Moon's orbit.

The solar eclipses on February 3, 1916 (total), July 30, 1916 (annular), January 23, 1917 (partial), and July 19, 1917 (partial) occur in the previous lunar year eclipse set.

Solar eclipse series sets from 1916 to 1920
Ascending node			Descending node		
Saros	Map	Gamma	Saros	Map	Gamma
111	December 24, 1916 Partial	−1.5321	116	June 19, 1917 Partial	1.2857
121	December 14, 1917 Annular	−0.9157	126	June 8, 1918 Total	0.4658
131	December 3, 1918 Annular	−0.2387	136 Totality in Príncipe	May 29, 1919 Total	−0.2955
141	November 22, 1919 Annular	0.4549	146	May 18, 1920 Partial	−1.0239
151	November 10, 1920 Partial	1.1287			

=== Saros 131 ===
This eclipse is a part of Saros series 131, repeating every 18 years, 11 days, and containing 70 events. The series started with a partial solar eclipse on August 1, 1125. It contains total eclipses from March 27, 1522 through May 30, 1612; hybrid eclipses from June 10, 1630 through July 24, 1702; and annular eclipses from August 4, 1720 through June 18, 2243. The series ends at member 70 as a partial eclipse on September 2, 2369. Its eclipses are tabulated in three columns; every third eclipse in the same column is one exeligmos apart, so they all cast shadows over approximately the same parts of the Earth.

The longest duration of totality was produced by member 28 at 58 seconds on May 30, 1612, and the longest duration of annularity was produced by member 50 at 7 minutes, 54 seconds on January 26, 2009. All eclipses in this series occur at the Moon’s ascending node of orbit.

Series members 39–60 occur between 1801 and 2200:
39	40	41
September 28, 1810	October 9, 1828	October 20, 1846
42	43	44
October 30, 1864	November 10, 1882	November 22, 1900
45	46	47
December 3, 1918	December 13, 1936	December 25, 1954
48	49	50
January 4, 1973	January 15, 1991	January 26, 2009
51	52	53
February 6, 2027	February 16, 2045	February 28, 2063
54	55	56
March 10, 2081	March 21, 2099	April 2, 2117
57	58	59
April 13, 2135	April 23, 2153	May 5, 2171
60
May 15, 2189

=== Metonic series ===
The metonic series repeats eclipses every 19 years (6939.69 days), lasting about 5 cycles. Eclipses occur in nearly the same calendar date. In addition, the octon subseries repeats 1/5 of that or every 3.8 years (1387.94 days). All eclipses in this table occur at the Moon's ascending node.

22 eclipse events between December 2, 1880 and July 9, 1964
December 2–3	September 20–21	July 9–10	April 26–28	February 13–14
111	113	115	117	119
December 2, 1880		July 9, 1888	April 26, 1892	February 13, 1896
121	123	125	127	129
December 3, 1899	September 21, 1903	July 10, 1907	April 28, 1911	February 14, 1915
131	133	135	137	139
December 3, 1918	September 21, 1922	July 9, 1926	April 28, 1930	February 14, 1934
141	143	145	147	149
December 2, 1937	September 21, 1941	July 9, 1945	April 28, 1949	February 14, 1953
151	153	155		
December 2, 1956	September 20, 1960	July 9, 1964		

=== Tritos series ===
This eclipse is a part of a tritos cycle, repeating at alternating nodes every 135 synodic months (≈ 3986.63 days, or 11 years minus 1 month). Their appearance and longitude are irregular due to a lack of synchronization with the anomalistic month (period of perigee), but groupings of 3 tritos cycles (≈ 33 years minus 3 months) come close (≈ 434.044 anomalistic months), so eclipses are similar in these groupings.

Series members between 1801 and 2200
October 9, 1809 (Saros 121)	September 7, 1820 (Saros 122)	August 7, 1831 (Saros 123)	July 8, 1842 (Saros 124)	June 6, 1853 (Saros 125)
May 6, 1864 (Saros 126)	April 6, 1875 (Saros 127)	March 5, 1886 (Saros 128)	February 1, 1897 (Saros 129)	January 3, 1908 (Saros 130)
December 3, 1918 (Saros 131)	November 1, 1929 (Saros 132)	October 1, 1940 (Saros 133)	September 1, 1951 (Saros 134)	July 31, 1962 (Saros 135)
June 30, 1973 (Saros 136)	May 30, 1984 (Saros 137)	April 29, 1995 (Saros 138)	March 29, 2006 (Saros 139)	February 26, 2017 (Saros 140)
January 26, 2028 (Saros 141)	December 26, 2038 (Saros 142)	November 25, 2049 (Saros 143)	October 24, 2060 (Saros 144)	September 23, 2071 (Saros 145)
August 24, 2082 (Saros 146)	July 23, 2093 (Saros 147)	June 22, 2104 (Saros 148)	May 24, 2115 (Saros 149)	April 22, 2126 (Saros 150)
March 21, 2137 (Saros 151)	February 19, 2148 (Saros 152)	January 19, 2159 (Saros 153)	December 18, 2169 (Saros 154)	November 17, 2180 (Saros 155)
October 18, 2191 (Saros 156)

=== Inex series ===
This eclipse is a part of the long period inex cycle, repeating at alternating nodes, every 358 synodic months (≈ 10,571.95 days, or 29 years minus 20 days). Their appearance and longitude are irregular due to a lack of synchronization with the anomalistic month (period of perigee). However, groupings of 3 inex cycles (≈ 87 years minus 2 months) comes close (≈ 1,151.02 anomalistic months), so eclipses are similar in these groupings.

Series members between 1801 and 2200
February 21, 1803 (Saros 127)	February 1, 1832 (Saros 128)	January 11, 1861 (Saros 129)
December 22, 1889 (Saros 130)	December 3, 1918 (Saros 131)	November 12, 1947 (Saros 132)
October 23, 1976 (Saros 133)	October 3, 2005 (Saros 134)	September 12, 2034 (Saros 135)
August 24, 2063 (Saros 136)	August 3, 2092 (Saros 137)	July 14, 2121 (Saros 138)
June 25, 2150 (Saros 139)	June 5, 2179 (Saros 140)	
