= Solar eclipse of June 28, 1908 =

20th-century annular solar eclipse

- Annular eclipse
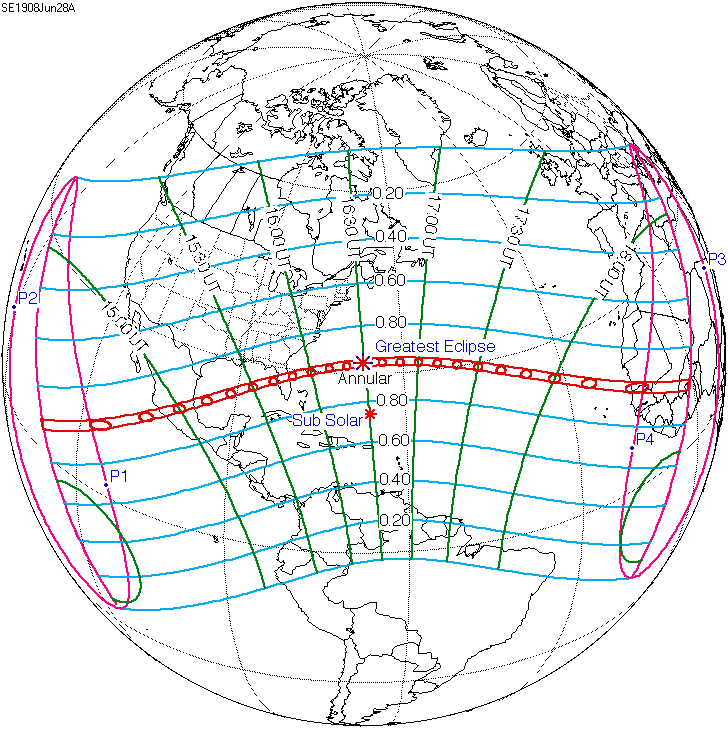
- Map
- Gamma: 0.1389
- Magnitude: 0.9655

Maximum eclipse
- Duration: 240 s (4 min 0 s)
- Coordinates: 31.4°N 67.2°W
- Max. width of band: 126 km (78 mi)

Times (UTC)
- Greatest eclipse: 16:29:51

References
- Saros: 135 (33 of 71)
- Catalog # (SE5000): 9300

An annular solar eclipse occurred at the Moon's ascending node of orbit on Sunday, June 28, 1908, with a magnitude of 0.9655. A solar eclipse occurs when the Moon passes between Earth and the Sun, thereby totally or partly obscuring the image of the Sun for a viewer on Earth. An annular solar eclipse occurs when the Moon's apparent diameter is smaller than the Sun's, blocking most of the Sun's light and causing the Sun to look like an annulus (ring). An annular eclipse appears as a partial eclipse over a region of the Earth thousands of kilometres wide. Occurring about 4 days before apogee (on July 2, 1908, at 16:30 UTC), the Moon's apparent diameter was smaller.

The annular eclipse was visible in North America, including a part of central Mexico around Mexico City; Orlando; and Daytona Beach, Florida in the United States. In Africa, it included Rosso, Mauritania, the northernmost part of Senegal, Bamako and the southwestern French Sudan (now Mali), the southwesternmost part of Upper Volta (now Burkina Faso) and northern British Gold Coast (now Ghana). A partial eclipse was visible for parts of northern South America, most of North America, the Caribbean, West Africa, North Africa, and Western Europe.

== Eclipse details ==
Shown below are two tables displaying details about this particular solar eclipse. The first table outlines times at which the Moon's penumbra or umbra attains the specific parameter, and the second table describes various other parameters pertaining to this eclipse.

June 28, 1908 Solar Eclipse Times
Event	Time (UTC)
First Penumbral External Contact	1908 June 28 at 13:29:11.1 UTC
First Umbral External Contact	1908 June 28 at 14:33:04.2 UTC
First Central Line	1908 June 28 at 14:34:43.5 UTC
First Umbral Internal Contact	1908 June 28 at 14:36:22.8 UTC
First Penumbral Internal Contact	1908 June 28 at 15:41:23.7 UTC
Greatest Eclipse	1908 June 28 at 16:29:51.0 UTC
Equatorial Conjunction	1908 June 28 at 16:30:40.3 UTC
Ecliptic Conjunction	1908 June 28 at 16:31:28.2 UTC
Greatest Duration	1908 June 28 at 16:37:12.6 UTC
Last Penumbral Internal Contact	1908 June 28 at 17:18:16.1 UTC
Last Umbral Internal Contact	1908 June 28 at 18:23:16.9 UTC
Last Central Line	1908 June 28 at 18:24:58.5 UTC
Last Umbral External Contact	1908 June 28 at 18:26:40.0 UTC
Last Penumbral External Contact	1908 June 28 at 19:30:35.4 UTC

June 28, 1908 Solar Eclipse Parameters
Parameter	Value
Eclipse Magnitude	0.96548
Eclipse Obscuration	0.93215
Gamma	0.13895
Sun Right Ascension	06h28m25.7s
Sun Declination	+23°17'24.0"
Sun Semi-Diameter	15'43.8"
Sun Equatorial Horizontal Parallax	08.6"
Moon Right Ascension	06h28m24.0s
Moon Declination	+23°24'59.9"
Moon Semi-Diameter	14'57.6"
Moon Equatorial Horizontal Parallax	0°54'54.1"
ΔT	8.4 s

== Eclipse season ==
This eclipse is part of an eclipse season, a period, roughly every six months, when eclipses occur. Only two (or occasionally three) eclipse seasons occur each year, and each season lasts about 35 days and repeats just short of six months (173 days) later; thus two full eclipse seasons always occur each year. Either two or three eclipses happen each eclipse season. In the sequence below, each eclipse is separated by a fortnight. The first and last eclipse in this sequence is separated by one synodic month.

Eclipse season of June–July 1908
June 14 Descending node (full moon)	June 28 Ascending node (new moon)	July 13 Descending node (full moon)
Penumbral lunar eclipse Lunar Saros 109	Annular solar eclipse Solar Saros 135	Penumbral lunar eclipse Lunar Saros 147

== Related eclipses ==
=== Eclipses in 1908 ===
- A total solar eclipse on January 3.
- A penumbral lunar eclipse on January 18.
- A penumbral lunar eclipse on June 14.
- An annular solar eclipse on June 28.
- A penumbral lunar eclipse on July 13.
- A penumbral lunar eclipse on December 7.
- A hybrid solar eclipse on December 23.

=== Metonic ===
- Preceded by: Solar eclipse of September 9, 1904
- Followed by: Solar eclipse of April 17, 1912

=== Tzolkinex ===
- Preceded by: Solar eclipse of May 18, 1901
- Followed by: Solar eclipse of August 10, 1915

=== Half-Saros ===
- Preceded by: Lunar eclipse of June 23, 1899
- Followed by: Lunar eclipse of July 4, 1917

=== Tritos ===
- Preceded by: Solar eclipse of July 29, 1897
- Followed by: Solar eclipse of May 29, 1919

=== Solar Saros 135 ===
- Preceded by: Solar eclipse of June 17, 1890
- Followed by: Solar eclipse of July 9, 1926

=== Inex ===
- Preceded by: Solar eclipse of July 19, 1879
- Followed by: Solar eclipse of June 8, 1937

=== Triad ===
- Preceded by: Solar eclipse of August 27, 1821
- Followed by: Solar eclipse of April 29, 1995

=== Solar eclipses of 1906–1909 ===
This eclipse is a member of a semester series. An eclipse in a semester series of solar eclipses repeats approximately every 177 days and 4 hours (a semester) at alternating nodes of the Moon's orbit.

The partial solar eclipses on February 23, 1906 and August 20, 1906 occur in the previous lunar year eclipse set.

Solar eclipse series sets from 1906 to 1909
Ascending node			Descending node		
Saros	Map	Gamma	Saros	Map	Gamma
115	July 21, 1906 Partial	−1.3637	120	January 14, 1907 Total	0.8628
125	July 10, 1907 Annular	−0.6313	130	January 3, 1908 Total	0.1934
135	June 28, 1908 Annular	0.1389	140	December 23, 1908 Hybrid	−0.4985
145	June 17, 1909 Hybrid	0.8957	150	December 12, 1909 Partial	−1.2456

=== Saros 135 ===
This eclipse is a part of Saros series 135, repeating every 18 years, 11 days, and containing 71 events. The series started with a partial solar eclipse on July 5, 1331. It contains annular eclipses from October 21, 1511 through February 24, 2305; hybrid eclipses on March 8, 2323 and March 18, 2341; and total eclipses from March 29, 2359 through May 22, 2449. The series ends at member 71 as a partial eclipse on August 17, 2593. Its eclipses are tabulated in three columns; every third eclipse in the same column is one exeligmos apart, so they all cast shadows over approximately the same parts of the Earth.

The longest duration of annularity was produced by member 16 at 10 minutes, 41 seconds on December 24, 1601, and the longest duration of totality will be produced by member 62 at 2 minutes, 27 seconds on May 12, 2431. All eclipses in this series occur at the Moon’s ascending node of orbit.

Series members 28–49 occur between 1801 and 2200:
28	29	30
May 5, 1818	May 15, 1836	May 26, 1854
31	32	33
June 6, 1872	June 17, 1890	June 28, 1908
34	35	36
July 9, 1926	July 20, 1944	July 31, 1962
37	38	39
August 10, 1980	August 22, 1998	September 1, 2016
40	42	42
September 12, 2034	September 22, 2052	October 4, 2070
43	44	45
October 14, 2088	October 26, 2106	November 6, 2124
46	47	48
November 17, 2142	November 27, 2160	December 9, 2178
49
December 19, 2196

=== Metonic series ===
The metonic series repeats eclipses every 19 years (6939.69 days), lasting about 5 cycles. Eclipses occur in nearly the same calendar date. In addition, the octon subseries repeats 1/5 of that or every 3.8 years (1387.94 days). All eclipses in this table occur at the Moon's ascending node.

23 eclipse events between February 3, 1859 and June 29, 1946
February 1–3	November 21–22	September 8–10	June 28–29	April 16–18
109	111	113	115	117
February 3, 1859	November 21, 1862		June 28, 1870	April 16, 1874
119	121	123	125	127
February 2, 1878	November 21, 1881	September 8, 1885	June 28, 1889	April 16, 1893
129	131	133	135	137
February 1, 1897	November 22, 1900	September 9, 1904	June 28, 1908	April 17, 1912
139	141	143	145	147
February 3, 1916	November 22, 1919	September 10, 1923	June 29, 1927	April 18, 1931
149	151	153	155	
February 3, 1935	November 21, 1938	September 10, 1942	June 29, 1946	

=== Tritos series ===
This eclipse is a part of a tritos cycle, repeating at alternating nodes every 135 synodic months (≈ 3986.63 days, or 11 years minus 1 month). Their appearance and longitude are irregular due to a lack of synchronization with the anomalistic month (period of perigee), but groupings of 3 tritos cycles (≈ 33 years minus 3 months) come close (≈ 434.044 anomalistic months), so eclipses are similar in these groupings.

Series members between 1801 and 2200
April 4, 1810 (Saros 126)	March 4, 1821 (Saros 127)	February 1, 1832 (Saros 128)	December 31, 1842 (Saros 129)	November 30, 1853 (Saros 130)
October 30, 1864 (Saros 131)	September 29, 1875 (Saros 132)	August 29, 1886 (Saros 133)	July 29, 1897 (Saros 134)	June 28, 1908 (Saros 135)
May 29, 1919 (Saros 136)	April 28, 1930 (Saros 137)	March 27, 1941 (Saros 138)	February 25, 1952 (Saros 139)	January 25, 1963 (Saros 140)
December 24, 1973 (Saros 141)	November 22, 1984 (Saros 142)	October 24, 1995 (Saros 143)	September 22, 2006 (Saros 144)	August 21, 2017 (Saros 145)
July 22, 2028 (Saros 146)	June 21, 2039 (Saros 147)	May 20, 2050 (Saros 148)	April 20, 2061 (Saros 149)	March 19, 2072 (Saros 150)
February 16, 2083 (Saros 151)	January 16, 2094 (Saros 152)	December 17, 2104 (Saros 153)	November 16, 2115 (Saros 154)	October 16, 2126 (Saros 155)
September 15, 2137 (Saros 156)	August 14, 2148 (Saros 157)	July 15, 2159 (Saros 158)	June 14, 2170 (Saros 159)	May 13, 2181 (Saros 160)
April 12, 2192 (Saros 161)

=== Inex series ===
This eclipse is a part of the long period inex cycle, repeating at alternating nodes, every 358 synodic months (≈ 10,571.95 days, or 29 years minus 20 days). Their appearance and longitude are irregular due to a lack of synchronization with the anomalistic month (period of perigee). However, groupings of 3 inex cycles (≈ 87 years minus 2 months) comes close (≈ 1,151.02 anomalistic months), so eclipses are similar in these groupings.

Series members between 1801 and 2200
August 27, 1821 (Saros 132)	August 7, 1850 (Saros 133)	July 19, 1879 (Saros 134)
June 28, 1908 (Saros 135)	June 8, 1937 (Saros 136)	May 20, 1966 (Saros 137)
April 29, 1995 (Saros 138)	April 8, 2024 (Saros 139)	March 20, 2053 (Saros 140)
February 27, 2082 (Saros 141)	February 8, 2111 (Saros 142)	January 20, 2140 (Saros 143)
December 29, 2168 (Saros 144)	December 9, 2197 (Saros 145)	
