= Solar eclipse of June 17, 1928 =

20th-century partial solar eclipse

- Partial eclipse
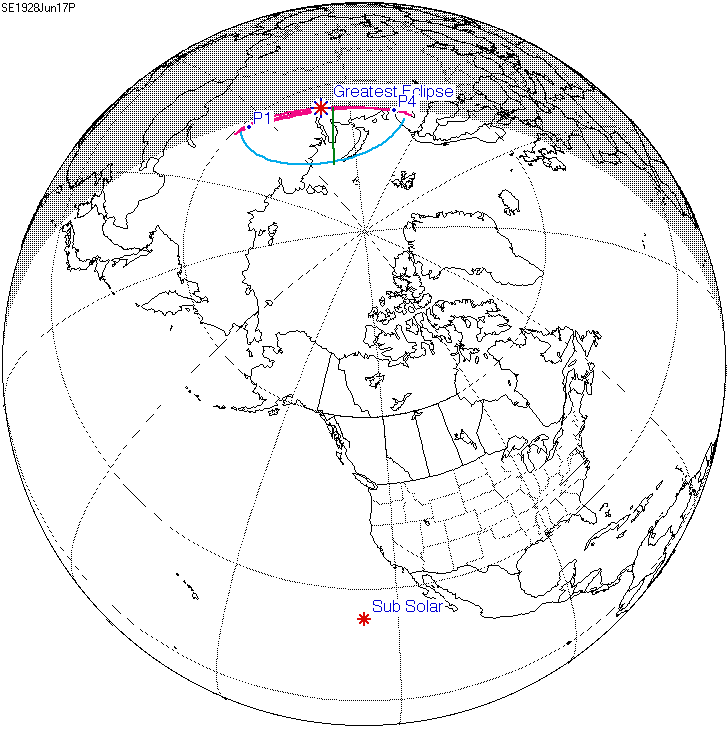
- Map
- Gamma: 1.5107
- Magnitude: 0.0375

Maximum eclipse
- Coordinates: 65.6°N 70.6°E

Times (UTC)
- Greatest eclipse: 20:27:28

References
- Saros: 155 (1 of 71)
- Catalog # (SE5000): 9346

A partial solar eclipse occurred at the Moon's ascending node of orbit on Sunday, June 17, 1928, with a magnitude of 0.0375. A solar eclipse occurs when the Moon passes between Earth and the Sun, thereby totally or partly obscuring the image of the Sun for a viewer on Earth. A partial solar eclipse occurs in the polar regions of the Earth when the center of the Moon's shadow misses the Earth.

A partial eclipse was visible for parts of the northern Soviet Union. This is the 1st solar eclipse of Solar Saros 155, and this is the next saros cycle to begin after the partial solar eclipse of July 19, 1917 (part of Solar Saros 154).

== Eclipse details ==
Shown below are two tables displaying details about this particular solar eclipse. The first table outlines times at which the Moon's penumbra or umbra attains the specific parameter, and the second table describes various other parameters pertaining to this eclipse.

June 17, 1928 Solar Eclipse Times
Event	Time (UTC)
First Penumbral External Contact	1928 June 17 at 20:02:02.9 UTC
Greatest Eclipse	1928 June 17 at 20:27:28.2 UTC
Ecliptic Conjunction	1928 June 17 at 20:42:22.7 UTC
Equatorial Conjunction	1928 June 17 at 20:46:44.4 UTC
Last Penumbral External Contact	1928 June 17 at 20:52:47.3 UTC

June 17, 1928 Solar Eclipse Parameters
Parameter	Value
Eclipse Magnitude	0.03756
Eclipse Obscuration	0.00879
Gamma	1.51070
Sun Right Ascension	05h44m06.5s
Sun Declination	+23°23'56.5"
Sun Semi-Diameter	15'44.4"
Sun Equatorial Horizontal Parallax	08.7"
Moon Right Ascension	05h43m17.3s
Moon Declination	+24°54'44.1"
Moon Semi-Diameter	16'32.3"
Moon Equatorial Horizontal Parallax	1°00'41.9"
ΔT	24.2 s

== Eclipse season ==
This eclipse is part of an eclipse season, a period, roughly every six months, when eclipses occur. Only two (or occasionally three) eclipse seasons occur each year, and each season lasts about 35 days and repeats just short of six months (173 days) later; thus two full eclipse seasons always occur each year. Either two or three eclipses happen each eclipse season. In the sequence below, each eclipse is separated by a fortnight. The first and last eclipse in this sequence is separated by one synodic month.

Eclipse season of May–June 1928
May 19 Ascending node (new moon)	June 3 Descending node (full moon)	June 17 Ascending node (new moon)
Total solar eclipse Solar Saros 117	Total lunar eclipse Lunar Saros 129	Partial solar eclipse Solar Saros 155

== Related eclipses ==
=== Eclipses in 1928 ===
- A non-central total solar eclipse on May 19.
- A total lunar eclipse on June 3.
- A partial solar eclipse on June 17.
- A partial solar eclipse on November 12.
- A total lunar eclipse on November 27.

=== Metonic ===
- Preceded by: Solar eclipse of August 30, 1924

=== Tzolkinex ===
- Followed by: Solar eclipse of July 30, 1935

=== Tritos ===
- Preceded by: Solar eclipse of July 19, 1917

=== Solar Saros 155 ===
- Followed by: Solar eclipse of June 29, 1946

=== Triad ===
- Preceded by: Solar eclipse of August 16, 1841

=== Solar eclipses of 1924–1928 ===
This eclipse is a member of a semester series. An eclipse in a semester series of solar eclipses repeats approximately every 177 days and 4 hours (a semester) at alternating nodes of the Moon's orbit.

The partial solar eclipses on March 5, 1924 and August 30, 1924 occur in the previous lunar year eclipse set, and the solar eclipses on May 19, 1928 and November 12, 1928 occur in the next lunar year eclipse set.

Solar eclipse series sets from 1924 to 1928
Ascending node			Descending node		
Saros	Map	Gamma	Saros	Map	Gamma
115	July 31, 1924 Partial	−1.4459	120	January 24, 1925 Total	0.8661
125	July 20, 1925 Annular	−0.7193	130 Totality in Sumatra, Indonesia	January 14, 1926 Total	0.1973
135	July 9, 1926 Annular	0.0538	140	January 3, 1927 Annular	−0.4956
145	June 29, 1927 Total	0.8163	150	December 24, 1927 Partial	−1.2416
155	June 17, 1928 Partial	1.5107			

=== Saros 155 ===
This eclipse is a part of Saros series 155, repeating every 18 years, 11 days, and containing 71 events. The series started with a partial solar eclipse on June 17, 1928. It contains total eclipses from September 12, 2072 through August 30, 2649; hybrid eclipses from September 10, 2667 through October 2, 2703; and annular eclipses from October 13, 2721 through May 8, 3064. The series ends at member 71 as a partial eclipse on July 24, 3190. Its eclipses are tabulated in three columns; every third eclipse in the same column is one exeligmos apart, so they all cast shadows over approximately the same parts of the Earth.

The longest duration of totality will be produced by member 14 at 4 minutes, 5 seconds on November 6, 2162, and the longest duration of annularity will be produced by member 63 at 5 minutes, 31 seconds on April 28, 3046. All eclipses in this series occur at the Moon’s ascending node of orbit.

Series members 1–16 occur between 1928 and 2200:
1	2	3
June 17, 1928	June 29, 1946	July 9, 1964
4	5	6
July 20, 1982	July 31, 2000	August 11, 2018
7	8	9
August 21, 2036	September 1–2, 2054	September 12, 2072
10	11	12
September 23, 2090	October 4–5, 2108	October 16, 2126
13	14	15
October 26, 2144	November 6–7, 2162	November 17, 2180
16
November 28, 2198

=== Metonic series ===
The metonic series repeats eclipses every 19 years (6939.69 days), lasting about 5 cycles. Eclipses occur in nearly the same calendar date. In addition, the octon subseries repeats 1/5 of that or every 3.8 years (1387.94 days). All eclipses in this table occur at the Moon's ascending node.

25 eclipse events between April 5, 1837 and June 17, 1928
April 5–6	January 22–23	November 10–11	August 28–30	June 17–18
107	109	111	113	115
April 5, 1837	January 22, 1841	November 10, 1844	August 28, 1848	June 17, 1852
117	119	121	123	125
April 5, 1856	January 23, 1860	November 11, 1863	August 29, 1867	June 18, 1871
127	129	131	133	135
April 6, 1875	January 22, 1879	November 10, 1882	August 29, 1886	June 17, 1890
137	139	141	143	145
April 6, 1894	January 22, 1898	November 11, 1901	August 30, 1905	June 17, 1909
147	149	151	153	155
April 6, 1913	January 23, 1917	November 10, 1920	August 30, 1924	June 17, 1928

=== Tritos series ===
This eclipse is a part of a tritos cycle, repeating at alternating nodes every 135 synodic months (≈ 3986.63 days, or 11 years minus 1 month). Their appearance and longitude are irregular due to a lack of synchronization with the anomalistic month (period of perigee), but groupings of 3 tritos cycles (≈ 33 years minus 3 months) come close (≈ 434.044 anomalistic months), so eclipses are similar in these groupings.

Series members between 1801 and 1928
May 25, 1808 (Saros 144)	April 24, 1819 (Saros 145)	March 24, 1830 (Saros 146)	February 21, 1841 (Saros 147)	January 21, 1852 (Saros 148)
December 21, 1862 (Saros 149)	November 20, 1873 (Saros 150)	October 19, 1884 (Saros 151)	September 18, 1895 (Saros 152)	August 20, 1906 (Saros 153)
July 19, 1917 (Saros 154)	June 17, 1928 (Saros 155)			

=== Inex series ===
This eclipse is a part of the long period inex cycle, repeating at alternating nodes, every 358 synodic months (≈ 10,571.95 days, or 29 years minus 20 days). Their appearance and longitude are irregular due to a lack of synchronization with the anomalistic month (period of perigee). However, groupings of 3 inex cycles (≈ 87 years minus 2 months) comes close (≈ 1,151.02 anomalistic months), so eclipses are similar in these groupings.

The partial solar eclipse on December 18, 2188 (part of Saros 164) is also a part of this series but is not included in the table below.

Series members between 1801 and 1928
September 5, 1812 (Saros 151)	August 16, 1841 (Saros 152)	July 28, 1870 (Saros 153)
	June 17, 1928 (Saros 155)	
