= Solar eclipse of September 20, 1960 =

20th-century partial solar eclipse

- Partial eclipse
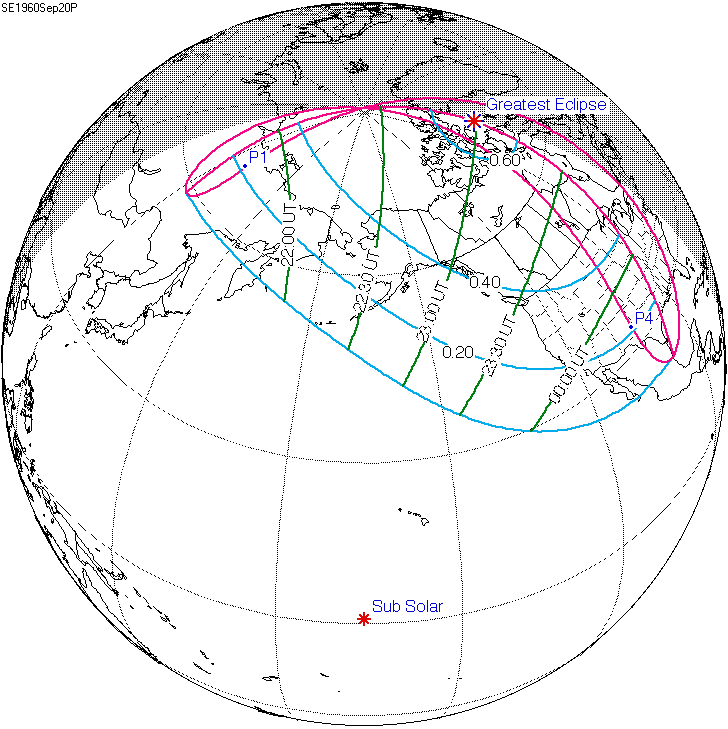
- Map
- Gamma: 1.2057
- Magnitude: 0.6139

Maximum eclipse
- Coordinates: 72.1°N 74.1°W

Times (UTC)
- Greatest eclipse: 22:59:56

References
- Saros: 153 (6 of 70)
- Catalog # (SE5000): 9421

A partial solar eclipse occurred at the Moon's ascending node of orbit between Tuesday, September 20 and Wednesday, September 21, 1960, with a magnitude of 0.6139. A solar eclipse occurs when the Moon passes between Earth and the Sun, thereby totally or partly obscuring the image of the Sun for a viewer on Earth. A partial solar eclipse occurs in the polar regions of the Earth when the center of the Moon's shadow misses the Earth.

A partial eclipse was visible for parts of the eastern Soviet Union on September 21 and Alaska, Canada, the United States, and northern Mexico on September 20.

== Eclipse details ==
Shown below are two tables displaying details about this particular solar eclipse. The first table outlines times at which the Moon's penumbra or umbra attains the specific parameter, and the second table describes various other parameters pertaining to this eclipse.

September 20, 1960 Solar Eclipse Times
Event	Time (UTC)
First Penumbral External Contact	1960 September 20 at 21:09:33.3 UTC
Equatorial Conjunction	1960 September 20 at 22:16:00.6 UTC
Greatest Eclipse	1960 September 20 at 22:59:55.7 UTC
Ecliptic Conjunction	1960 September 20 at 23:13:03.1 UTC
Last Penumbral External Contact	1960 September 21 at 00:50:33.6 UTC

September 20, 1960 Solar Eclipse Parameters
Parameter	Value
Eclipse Magnitude	0.61389
Eclipse Obscuration	0.51513
Gamma	1.20565
Sun Right Ascension	11h52m31.1s
Sun Declination	+00°48'39.5"
Sun Semi-Diameter	15'55.9"
Sun Equatorial Horizontal Parallax	08.8"
Moon Right Ascension	11h53m54.7s
Moon Declination	+01°53'18.2"
Moon Semi-Diameter	15'23.6"
Moon Equatorial Horizontal Parallax	0°56'29.8"
ΔT	33.5 s

== Eclipse season ==
This eclipse is part of an eclipse season, a period, roughly every six months, when eclipses occur. Only two (or occasionally three) eclipse seasons occur each year, and each season lasts about 35 days and repeats just short of six months (173 days) later; thus two full eclipse seasons always occur each year. Either two or three eclipses happen each eclipse season. In the sequence below, each eclipse is separated by a fortnight.

Eclipse season of September 1960
September 5 Descending node (full moon)	September 20 Ascending node (new moon)
Total lunar eclipse Lunar Saros 127	Partial solar eclipse Solar Saros 153

== Related eclipses ==
=== Eclipses in 1960 ===
- A total lunar eclipse on March 13.
- A partial solar eclipse on March 27.
- A total lunar eclipse on September 5.
- A partial solar eclipse on September 20.

=== Metonic ===
- Preceded by: Solar eclipse of December 2, 1956
- Followed by: Solar eclipse of July 9, 1964

=== Tzolkinex ===
- Preceded by: Solar eclipse of August 9, 1953
- Followed by: Solar eclipse of November 2, 1967

=== Half-Saros ===
- Preceded by: Lunar eclipse of September 15, 1951
- Followed by: Lunar eclipse of September 25, 1969

=== Tritos ===
- Preceded by: Solar eclipse of October 21, 1949
- Followed by: Solar eclipse of August 20, 1971

=== Solar Saros 153 ===
- Preceded by: Solar eclipse of September 10, 1942
- Followed by: Solar eclipse of October 2, 1978

=== Inex ===
- Preceded by: Solar eclipse of October 11, 1931
- Followed by: Solar eclipse of August 31, 1989

=== Triad ===
- Preceded by: Solar eclipse of November 20, 1873
- Followed by: Solar eclipse of July 22, 2047

=== Solar eclipses of 1957–1960 ===
This eclipse is a member of a semester series. An eclipse in a semester series of solar eclipses repeats approximately every 177 days and 4 hours (a semester) at alternating nodes of the Moon's orbit.

Solar eclipse series sets from 1957 to 1960
Descending node			Ascending node		
Saros	Map	Gamma	Saros	Map	Gamma
118	April 30, 1957 Annular (non-central)	0.9992	123	October 23, 1957 Total (non-central)	1.0022
128	April 19, 1958 Annular	0.275	133	October 12, 1958 Total	−0.2951
138	April 8, 1959 Annular	−0.4546	143	October 2, 1959 Total	0.4207
148	March 27, 1960 Partial	−1.1537	153	September 20, 1960 Partial	1.2057

=== Saros 153 ===
This eclipse is a part of Saros series 153, repeating every 18 years, 11 days, and containing 70 events. The series started with a partial solar eclipse on July 28, 1870. It contains annular eclipses from December 17, 2104 through May 26, 2970. There are no hybrid or total eclipses in this set. The series ends at member 70 as a partial eclipse on August 22, 3114. Its eclipses are tabulated in three columns; every third eclipse in the same column is one exeligmos apart, so they all cast shadows over approximately the same parts of the Earth.

The longest duration of annularity will be produced by member 38 at 7 minutes, 1 seconds on September 5, 2537. All eclipses in this series occur at the Moon’s ascending node of orbit.

Series members 1–19 occur between 1870 and 2200:
1	2	3
July 28, 1870	August 7, 1888	August 20, 1906
4	5	6
August 30, 1924	September 10, 1942	September 20, 1960
7	8	9
October 2, 1978	October 12, 1996	October 23, 2014
10	11	12
November 3, 2032	November 14, 2050	November 24, 2068
13	14	15
December 6, 2086	December 17, 2104	December 28, 2122
16	17	18
January 8, 2141	January 19, 2159	January 29, 2177
19
February 10, 2195

=== Metonic series ===
The metonic series repeats eclipses every 19 years (6939.69 days), lasting about 5 cycles. Eclipses occur in nearly the same calendar date. In addition, the octon subseries repeats 1/5 of that or every 3.8 years (1387.94 days). All eclipses in this table occur at the Moon's ascending node.

22 eclipse events between December 2, 1880 and July 9, 1964
December 2–3	September 20–21	July 9–10	April 26–28	February 13–14
111	113	115	117	119
December 2, 1880		July 9, 1888	April 26, 1892	February 13, 1896
121	123	125	127	129
December 3, 1899	September 21, 1903	July 10, 1907	April 28, 1911	February 14, 1915
131	133	135	137	139
December 3, 1918	September 21, 1922	July 9, 1926	April 28, 1930	February 14, 1934
141	143	145	147	149
December 2, 1937	September 21, 1941	July 9, 1945	April 28, 1949	February 14, 1953
151	153	155		
December 2, 1956	September 20, 1960	July 9, 1964		

=== Tritos series ===
This eclipse is a part of a tritos cycle, repeating at alternating nodes every 135 synodic months (≈ 3986.63 days, or 11 years minus 1 month). Their appearance and longitude are irregular due to a lack of synchronization with the anomalistic month (period of perigee), but groupings of 3 tritos cycles (≈ 33 years minus 3 months) come close (≈ 434.044 anomalistic months), so eclipses are similar in these groupings.

Series members between 1801 and 1982
November 29, 1807 (Saros 139)	October 29, 1818 (Saros 140)	September 28, 1829 (Saros 141)	August 27, 1840 (Saros 142)	July 28, 1851 (Saros 143)
June 27, 1862 (Saros 144)	May 26, 1873 (Saros 145)	April 25, 1884 (Saros 146)	March 26, 1895 (Saros 147)	February 23, 1906 (Saros 148)
January 23, 1917 (Saros 149)	December 24, 1927 (Saros 150)	November 21, 1938 (Saros 151)	October 21, 1949 (Saros 152)	September 20, 1960 (Saros 153)
August 20, 1971 (Saros 154)	July 20, 1982 (Saros 155)			

=== Inex series ===
This eclipse is a part of the long period inex cycle, repeating at alternating nodes, every 358 synodic months (≈ 10,571.95 days, or 29 years minus 20 days). Their appearance and longitude are irregular due to a lack of synchronization with the anomalistic month (period of perigee). However, groupings of 3 inex cycles (≈ 87 years minus 2 months) comes close (≈ 1,151.02 anomalistic months), so eclipses are similar in these groupings.

Series members between 1801 and 2200
December 30, 1815 (Saros 148)	December 9, 1844 (Saros 149)	November 20, 1873 (Saros 150)
October 31, 1902 (Saros 151)	October 11, 1931 (Saros 152)	September 20, 1960 (Saros 153)
August 31, 1989 (Saros 154)	August 11, 2018 (Saros 155)	July 22, 2047 (Saros 156)
July 1, 2076 (Saros 157)	June 12, 2105 (Saros 158)	May 23, 2134 (Saros 159)
	April 12, 2192 (Saros 161)	
