= Solar eclipse of February 3, 1935 =

20th-century partial solar eclipse

- Partial eclipse
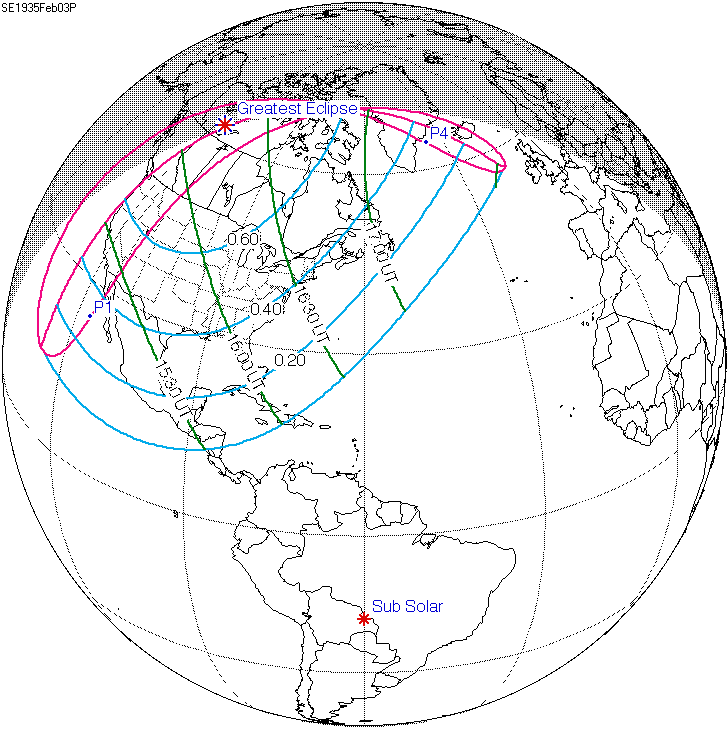
- Map
- Gamma: 1.1438
- Magnitude: 0.739

Maximum eclipse
- Coordinates: 62.5°N 115.4°W

Times (UTC)
- Greatest eclipse: 16:16:20

References
- Saros: 149 (16 of 71)
- Catalog # (SE5000): 9362

A partial solar eclipse occurred at the Moon's ascending node of orbit on Sunday, February 3, 1935, with a magnitude of 0.739. A solar eclipse occurs when the Moon passes between Earth and the Sun, thereby totally or partly obscuring the image of the Sun for a viewer on Earth. A partial solar eclipse occurs in the polar regions of the Earth when the center of the Moon's shadow misses the Earth.

This was the second of five solar eclipses in 1935, with the others occurring on January 5, June 30, July 30, and December 25. The next time this will occur is 2206.

A partial eclipse was visible for most of North America.

== Eclipse details ==
Shown below are two tables displaying details about this particular solar eclipse. The first table outlines times at which the Moon's penumbra or umbra attains the specific parameter, and the second table describes various other parameters pertaining to this eclipse.

February 3, 1935 Solar Eclipse Times
Event	Time (UTC)
First Penumbral External Contact	1935 February 3 at 14:30:31.4 UTC
Greatest Eclipse	1935 February 3 at 16:16:20.2 UTC
Ecliptic Conjunction	1935 February 3 at 16:27:42.1 UTC
Equatorial Conjunction	1935 February 3 at 17:04:33.7 UTC
Last Penumbral External Contact	1935 February 3 at 18:01:48.2 UTC

February 3, 1935 Solar Eclipse Parameters
Parameter	Value
Eclipse Magnitude	0.73901
Eclipse Obscuration	0.67784
Gamma	1.14380
Sun Right Ascension	21h05m33.3s
Sun Declination	-16°39'23.6"
Sun Semi-Diameter	16'13.5"
Sun Equatorial Horizontal Parallax	08.9"
Moon Right Ascension	21h03m43.1s
Moon Declination	-15°34'30.3"
Moon Semi-Diameter	16'44.0"
Moon Equatorial Horizontal Parallax	1°01'24.9"
ΔT	23.9 s

== Eclipse season ==
This eclipse is part of an eclipse season, a period, roughly every six months, when eclipses occur. Only two (or occasionally three) eclipse seasons occur each year, and each season lasts about 35 days and repeats just short of six months (173 days) later; thus two full eclipse seasons always occur each year. Either two or three eclipses happen each eclipse season. In the sequence below, each eclipse is separated by a fortnight. The first and last eclipse in this sequence is separated by one synodic month.

Eclipse season of January–February 1935
January 5 Ascending node (new moon)	January 19 Descending node (full moon)	February 3 Ascending node (new moon)
Partial solar eclipse Solar Saros 111	Total lunar eclipse Lunar Saros 123	Partial solar eclipse Solar Saros 149

== Related eclipses ==
=== Eclipses in 1935 ===
- A partial solar eclipse on January 5.
- A total lunar eclipse on January 19.
- A partial solar eclipse on February 3.
- A partial solar eclipse on June 30.
- A total lunar eclipse on July 16.
- A partial solar eclipse on July 30.
- An annular solar eclipse on December 25.

=== Metonic ===
- Preceded by: Solar eclipse of April 18, 1931
- Followed by: Solar eclipse of November 21, 1938

=== Tzolkinex ===
- Preceded by: Solar eclipse of December 24, 1927
- Followed by: Solar eclipse of March 16, 1942

=== Half-Saros ===
- Preceded by: Lunar eclipse of January 28, 1926
- Followed by: Lunar eclipse of February 9, 1944

=== Tritos ===
- Preceded by: Solar eclipse of March 5, 1924
- Followed by: Solar eclipse of January 3, 1946

=== Solar Saros 149 ===
- Preceded by: Solar eclipse of January 23, 1917
- Followed by: Solar eclipse of February 14, 1953

=== Inex ===
- Preceded by: Solar eclipse of February 23, 1906
- Followed by: Solar eclipse of January 14, 1964

=== Triad ===
- Preceded by: Solar eclipse of April 3, 1848
- Followed by: Solar eclipse of December 4, 2021

=== Solar eclipses of 1931–1935 ===
This eclipse is a member of a semester series. An eclipse in a semester series of solar eclipses repeats approximately every 177 days and 4 hours (a semester) at alternating nodes of the Moon's orbit.

The partial solar eclipses on April 18, 1931 and October 11, 1931 occur in the previous lunar year eclipse set, and the solar eclipses on January 5, 1935 (partial), June 30, 1935 (partial), and December 25, 1935 (annular) occur in the next lunar year eclipse set.

Solar eclipse series sets from 1931 to 1935
Descending node			Ascending node		
Saros	Map	Gamma	Saros	Map	Gamma
114	September 12, 1931 Partial	1.506	119	March 7, 1932 Annular	−0.9673
124	August 31, 1932 Total	0.8307	129	February 24, 1933 Annular	−0.2191
134	August 21, 1933 Annular	0.0869	139	February 14, 1934 Total	0.4868
144	August 10, 1934 Annular	−0.689	149	February 3, 1935 Partial	1.1438
154	July 30, 1935 Partial	−1.4259			

=== Saros 149 ===
This eclipse is a part of Saros series 149, repeating every 18 years, 11 days, 8 hours and containing 71 events. The series started with a partial solar eclipse on August 21, 1664. It contains total eclipses from April 9, 2043 through October 2, 2331; hybrid eclipses from October 13, 2349 through November 3, 2385; and annular eclipses from November 15, 2403 through July 13, 2800. The series ends at member 71 as a partial eclipse on September 28, 2926. Its eclipses are tabulated in three columns; every third eclipse in the same column is one exeligmos apart, so they all cast shadows over approximately the same parts of the Earth.

The longest duration of totality will be produced by member 31 at 4 minutes, 10 seconds on July 17, 2205, and the longest duration of annularity will be produced by member 62 at 5 minutes, 6 seconds on June 21, 2764. All eclipses in this series occur at the Moon’s ascending node of orbit.

Series members 9–30 occur between 1801 and 2200:
9	10	11
November 18, 1808	November 29, 1826	December 9, 1844
12	13	14
December 21, 1862	December 31, 1880	January 11, 1899
15	16	17
January 23, 1917	February 3, 1935	February 14, 1953
18	19	20
February 25, 1971	March 7, 1989	March 19, 2007
21	22	23
March 29, 2025	April 9, 2043	April 20, 2061
24	25	26
May 1, 2079	May 11, 2097	May 24, 2115
27	28	29
June 3, 2133	June 14, 2151	June 25, 2169
30
July 6, 2187

=== Metonic series ===
The metonic series repeats eclipses every 19 years (6939.69 days), lasting about 5 cycles. Eclipses occur in nearly the same calendar date. In addition, the octon subseries repeats 1/5 of that or every 3.8 years (1387.94 days). All eclipses in this table occur at the Moon's ascending node.

23 eclipse events between February 3, 1859 and June 29, 1946
February 1–3	November 21–22	September 8–10	June 28–29	April 16–18
109	111	113	115	117
February 3, 1859	November 21, 1862		June 28, 1870	April 16, 1874
119	121	123	125	127
February 2, 1878	November 21, 1881	September 8, 1885	June 28, 1889	April 16, 1893
129	131	133	135	137
February 1, 1897	November 22, 1900	September 9, 1904	June 28, 1908	April 17, 1912
139	141	143	145	147
February 3, 1916	November 22, 1919	September 10, 1923	June 29, 1927	April 18, 1931
149	151	153	155	
February 3, 1935	November 21, 1938	September 10, 1942	June 29, 1946	

=== Tritos series ===
This eclipse is a part of a tritos cycle, repeating at alternating nodes every 135 synodic months (≈ 3986.63 days, or 11 years minus 1 month). Their appearance and longitude are irregular due to a lack of synchronization with the anomalistic month (period of perigee), but groupings of 3 tritos cycles (≈ 33 years minus 3 months) come close (≈ 434.044 anomalistic months), so eclipses are similar in these groupings.

The partial solar eclipse on October 24, 2098 (part of Saros 164) is also a part of this series but is not included in the table below.

Series members between 1801 and 2011
February 11, 1804 (Saros 137)	January 10, 1815 (Saros 138)	December 9, 1825 (Saros 139)	November 9, 1836 (Saros 140)	October 9, 1847 (Saros 141)
September 7, 1858 (Saros 142)	August 7, 1869 (Saros 143)	July 7, 1880 (Saros 144)	June 6, 1891 (Saros 145)	May 7, 1902 (Saros 146)
April 6, 1913 (Saros 147)	March 5, 1924 (Saros 148)	February 3, 1935 (Saros 149)	January 3, 1946 (Saros 150)	December 2, 1956 (Saros 151)
November 2, 1967 (Saros 152)	October 2, 1978 (Saros 153)	August 31, 1989 (Saros 154)	July 31, 2000 (Saros 155)	July 1, 2011 (Saros 156)

=== Inex series ===
This eclipse is a part of the long period inex cycle, repeating at alternating nodes, every 358 synodic months (≈ 10,571.95 days, or 29 years minus 20 days). Their appearance and longitude are irregular due to a lack of synchronization with the anomalistic month (period of perigee). However, groupings of 3 inex cycles (≈ 87 years minus 2 months) comes close (≈ 1,151.02 anomalistic months), so eclipses are similar in these groupings.

Series members between 1801 and 2200
April 24, 1819 (Saros 145)	April 3, 1848 (Saros 146)	March 15, 1877 (Saros 147)
February 23, 1906 (Saros 148)	February 3, 1935 (Saros 149)	January 14, 1964 (Saros 150)
December 24, 1992 (Saros 151)	December 4, 2021 (Saros 152)	November 14, 2050 (Saros 153)
October 24, 2079 (Saros 154)	October 5, 2108 (Saros 155)	September 15, 2137 (Saros 156)
August 25, 2166 (Saros 157)	August 5, 2195 (Saros 158)	
