= Solar eclipse of June 29, 1946 =

20th-century partial solar eclipse

- Partial eclipse
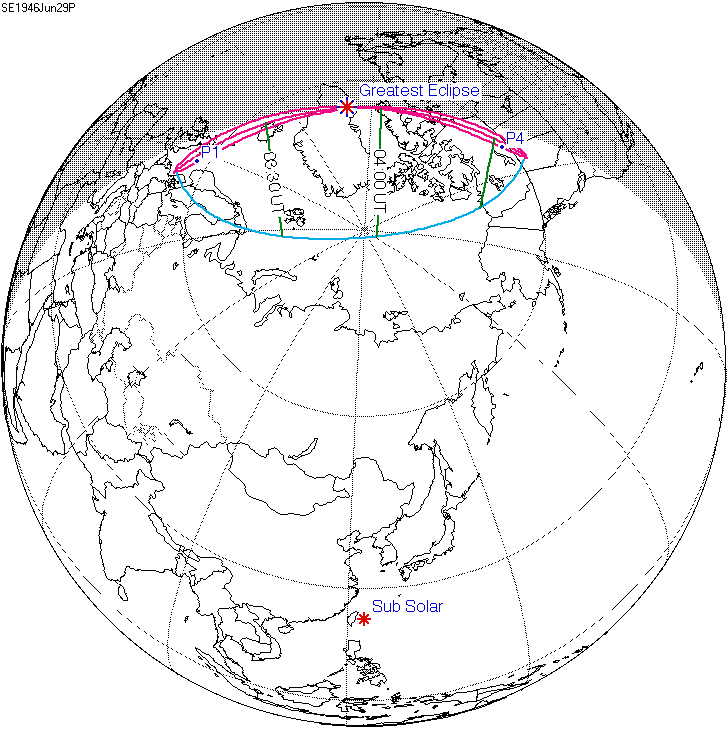
- Map
- Gamma: 1.4361
- Magnitude: 0.1802

Maximum eclipse
- Coordinates: 66.6°N 50.8°W

Times (UTC)
- Greatest eclipse: 3:51:58

References
- Saros: 155 (2 of 71)
- Catalog # (SE5000): 9389

A partial solar eclipse occurred at the Moon's ascending node of orbit on Saturday, June 29, 1946, with a magnitude of 0.1802. A solar eclipse occurs when the Moon passes between Earth and the Sun, thereby totally or partly obscuring the image of the Sun for a viewer on Earth. A partial solar eclipse occurs in the polar regions of the Earth when the center of the Moon's shadow misses the Earth.

This was the third of four partial solar eclipses in 1946, with the others occurring on January 3, May 30, and November 23.

A partial eclipse was visible for parts of Northern Europe, Greenland, and Canada.

== Eclipse details ==
Shown below are two tables displaying details about this particular solar eclipse. The first table outlines times at which the Moon's penumbra or umbra attains the specific parameter, and the second table describes various other parameters pertaining to this eclipse.

June 29, 1946 Solar Eclipse Times
Event	Time (UTC)
First Penumbral External Contact	1946 June 29 at 02:57:15.1 UTC
Greatest Eclipse	1946 June 29 at 03:51:57.7 UTC
Equatorial Conjunction	1946 June 29 at 03:58:28.2 UTC
Ecliptic Conjunction	1946 June 29 at 04:06:09.4 UTC
Last Penumbral External Contact	1946 June 29 at 04:46:39.5 UTC

June 29, 1946 Solar Eclipse Parameters
Parameter	Value
Eclipse Magnitude	0.18018
Eclipse Obscuration	0.09049
Gamma	1.43612
Sun Right Ascension	06h29m37.9s
Sun Declination	+23°16'18.2"
Sun Semi-Diameter	15'43.9"
Sun Equatorial Horizontal Parallax	08.6"
Moon Right Ascension	06h29m21.1s
Moon Declination	+24°43'20.8"
Moon Semi-Diameter	16'34.1"
Moon Equatorial Horizontal Parallax	1°00'48.5"
ΔT	27.5 s

== Eclipse season ==
This eclipse is part of an eclipse season, a period, roughly every six months, when eclipses occur. Only two (or occasionally three) eclipse seasons occur each year, and each season lasts about 35 days and repeats just short of six months (173 days) later; thus two full eclipse seasons always occur each year. Either two or three eclipses happen each eclipse season. In the sequence below, each eclipse is separated by a fortnight. The first and last eclipse in this sequence is separated by one synodic month.

Eclipse season of May–June 1946
May 30 Ascending node (new moon)	June 14 Descending node (full moon)	June 29 Ascending node (new moon)
Partial solar eclipse Solar Saros 117	Total lunar eclipse Lunar Saros 129	Partial solar eclipse Solar Saros 155

== Related eclipses ==
=== Eclipses in 1946 ===
- A partial solar eclipse on January 3.
- A partial solar eclipse on May 30.
- A total lunar eclipse on June 14.
- A partial solar eclipse on June 29.
- A partial solar eclipse on November 23.
- A total lunar eclipse on December 8.

=== Metonic ===
- Preceded by: Solar eclipse of September 10, 1942

=== Tzolkinex ===
- Followed by: Solar eclipse of August 9, 1953

=== Tritos ===
- Preceded by: Solar eclipse of July 30, 1935

=== Solar Saros 155 ===
- Preceded by: Solar eclipse of June 17, 1928
- Followed by: Solar eclipse of July 9, 1964

=== Inex ===
- Preceded by: Solar eclipse of July 19, 1917

=== Triad ===
- Preceded by: Solar eclipse of August 28, 1859

=== Solar eclipses of 1942–1946 ===
This eclipse is a member of a semester series. An eclipse in a semester series of solar eclipses repeats approximately every 177 days and 4 hours (a semester) at alternating nodes of the Moon's orbit.

The partial solar eclipses on March 16, 1942 and September 10, 1942 occur in the previous lunar year eclipse set, and the partial solar eclipses on May 30, 1946 and November 23, 1946 occur in the next lunar year eclipse set.

Solar eclipse series sets from 1942 to 1946
Ascending node			Descending node		
Saros	Map	Gamma	Saros	Map	Gamma
115	August 12, 1942 Partial	−1.5244	120	February 4, 1943 Total	0.8734
125	August 1, 1943 Annular	−0.8041	130	January 25, 1944 Total	0.2025
135	July 20, 1944 Annular	−0.0314	140	January 14, 1945 Annular	−0.4937
145	July 9, 1945 Total	0.7356	150	January 3, 1946 Partial	−1.2392
155	June 29, 1946 Partial	1.4361			

=== Saros 155 ===
This eclipse is a part of Saros series 155, repeating every 18 years, 11 days, and containing 71 events. The series started with a partial solar eclipse on June 17, 1928. It contains total eclipses from September 12, 2072 through August 30, 2649; hybrid eclipses from September 10, 2667 through October 2, 2703; and annular eclipses from October 13, 2721 through May 8, 3064. The series ends at member 71 as a partial eclipse on July 24, 3190. Its eclipses are tabulated in three columns; every third eclipse in the same column is one exeligmos apart, so they all cast shadows over approximately the same parts of the Earth.

The longest duration of totality will be produced by member 14 at 4 minutes, 5 seconds on November 6, 2162, and the longest duration of annularity will be produced by member 63 at 5 minutes, 31 seconds on April 28, 3046. All eclipses in this series occur at the Moon’s ascending node of orbit.

Series members 1–16 occur between 1928 and 2200:
1	2	3
June 17, 1928	June 29, 1946	July 9, 1964
4	5	6
July 20, 1982	July 31, 2000	August 11, 2018
7	8	9
August 21, 2036	September 2, 2054	September 12, 2072
10	11	12
September 23, 2090	October 5, 2108	October 16, 2126
13	14	15
October 26, 2144	November 7, 2162	November 17, 2180
16
November 28, 2198

=== Metonic series ===
The metonic series repeats eclipses every 19 years (6939.69 days), lasting about 5 cycles. Eclipses occur in nearly the same calendar date. In addition, the octon subseries repeats 1/5 of that or every 3.8 years (1387.94 days). All eclipses in this table occur at the Moon's ascending node.

23 eclipse events between February 3, 1859 and June 29, 1946
February 1–3	November 21–22	September 8–10	June 28–29	April 16–18
109	111	113	115	117
February 3, 1859	November 21, 1862		June 28, 1870	April 16, 1874
119	121	123	125	127
February 2, 1878	November 21, 1881	September 8, 1885	June 28, 1889	April 16, 1893
129	131	133	135	137
February 1, 1897	November 22, 1900	September 9, 1904	June 28, 1908	April 17, 1912
139	141	143	145	147
February 3, 1916	November 22, 1919	September 10, 1923	June 29, 1927	April 18, 1931
149	151	153	155	
February 3, 1935	November 21, 1938	September 10, 1942	June 29, 1946	

=== Tritos series ===
This eclipse is a part of a tritos cycle, repeating at alternating nodes every 135 synodic months (≈ 3986.63 days, or 11 years minus 1 month). Their appearance and longitude are irregular due to a lack of synchronization with the anomalistic month (period of perigee), but groupings of 3 tritos cycles (≈ 33 years minus 3 months) come close (≈ 434.044 anomalistic months), so eclipses are similar in these groupings.

Series members between 1801 and 1946
August 5, 1804 (Saros 142)	July 6, 1815 (Saros 143)	June 5, 1826 (Saros 144)	May 4, 1837 (Saros 145)	April 3, 1848 (Saros 146)
March 4, 1859 (Saros 147)	January 31, 1870 (Saros 148)	December 31, 1880 (Saros 149)	December 1, 1891 (Saros 150)	October 31, 1902 (Saros 151)
September 30, 1913 (Saros 152)	August 30, 1924 (Saros 153)	July 30, 1935 (Saros 154)	June 29, 1946 (Saros 155)	

=== Inex series ===
This eclipse is a part of the long period inex cycle, repeating at alternating nodes, every 358 synodic months (≈ 10,571.95 days, or 29 years minus 20 days). Their appearance and longitude are irregular due to a lack of synchronization with the anomalistic month (period of perigee). However, groupings of 3 inex cycles (≈ 87 years minus 2 months) comes close (≈ 1,151.02 anomalistic months), so eclipses are similar in these groupings.

Series members between 1801 and 1946
October 7, 1801 (Saros 150)	September 17, 1830 (Saros 151)	August 28, 1859 (Saros 152)
August 7, 1888 (Saros 153)	July 19, 1917 (Saros 154)	June 29, 1946 (Saros 155)
