= Solar eclipse of July 9, 1964 =

20th-century partial solar eclipse

- Partial eclipse
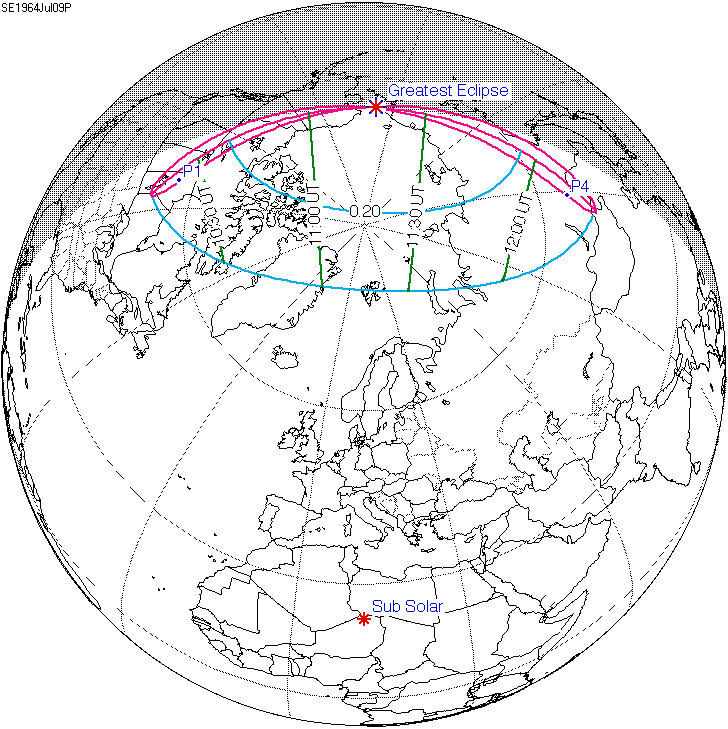
- Map
- Gamma: 1.3623
- Magnitude: 0.3221

Maximum eclipse
- Coordinates: 67.6°N 172.9°W

Times (UTC)
- Greatest eclipse: 11:17:53

References
- Saros: 155 (3 of 71)
- Catalog # (SE5000): 9429

A partial solar eclipse occurred at the Moon's ascending node of orbit on Thursday, July 9, 1964, with a magnitude of 0.3221. A solar eclipse occurs when the Moon passes between Earth and the Sun, thereby totally or partly obscuring the image of the Sun for a viewer on Earth. A partial solar eclipse occurs in the polar regions of the Earth when the center of the Moon's shadow misses the Earth.

This was the third of four partial solar eclipses in 1964, with the others occurring on January 14, June 10, and December 4.

A partial eclipse was visible for parts of Canada, Greenland, and the eastern Soviet Union.

== Eclipse details ==
Shown below are two tables displaying details about this particular solar eclipse. The first table outlines times at which the Moon's penumbra or umbra attains the specific parameter, and the second table describes various other parameters pertaining to this eclipse.

July 9, 1964 Solar Eclipse Times
Event	Time (UTC)
First Penumbral External Contact	1964 July 9 at 10:05:53.0 UTC
Equatorial Conjunction	1964 July 9 at 11:13:17.6 UTC
Greatest Eclipse	1964 July 9 at 11:17:53.0 UTC
Ecliptic Conjunction	1964 July 9 at 11:31:22.2 UTC
Last Penumbral External Contact	1964 July 9 at 12:29:56.9 UTC

July 9, 1964 Solar Eclipse Parameters
Parameter	Value
Eclipse Magnitude	0.32215
Eclipse Obscuration	0.21157
Gamma	1.36228
Sun Right Ascension	07h14m49.0s
Sun Declination	+22°19'48.2"
Sun Semi-Diameter	15'43.9"
Sun Equatorial Horizontal Parallax	08.6"
Moon Right Ascension	07h15m00.8s
Moon Declination	+23°42'32.7"
Moon Semi-Diameter	16'35.8"
Moon Equatorial Horizontal Parallax	1°00'54.7"
ΔT	35.4 s

== Eclipse season ==
This eclipse is part of an eclipse season, a period, roughly every six months, when eclipses occur. Only two (or occasionally three) eclipse seasons occur each year, and each season lasts about 35 days and repeats just short of six months (173 days) later; thus two full eclipse seasons always occur each year. Either two or three eclipses happen each eclipse season. In the sequence below, each eclipse is separated by a fortnight. The first and last eclipse in this sequence is separated by one synodic month.

Eclipse season of June–July 1964
June 10 Ascending node (new moon)	June 25 Descending node (full moon)	July 9 Ascending node (new moon)
Partial solar eclipse Solar Saros 117	Total lunar eclipse Lunar Saros 129	Partial solar eclipse Solar Saros 155

== Related eclipses ==
=== Eclipses in 1964 ===
- A partial solar eclipse on January 14.
- A partial solar eclipse on June 10.
- A total lunar eclipse on June 25.
- A partial solar eclipse on July 9.
- A partial solar eclipse on December 4.
- A total lunar eclipse on December 19.

=== Metonic ===
- Preceded by: Solar eclipse of September 20, 1960

=== Tzolkinex ===
- Followed by: Solar eclipse of August 20, 1971

=== Half-Saros ===
- Followed by: Lunar eclipse of July 15, 1973

=== Tritos ===
- Preceded by: Solar eclipse of August 9, 1953

=== Solar Saros 155 ===
- Preceded by: Solar eclipse of June 29, 1946
- Followed by: Solar eclipse of July 20, 1982

=== Inex ===
- Preceded by: Solar eclipse of July 30, 1935

=== Triad ===
- Preceded by: Solar eclipse of September 7, 1877

=== Solar eclipses of 1961–1964 ===
This eclipse is a member of a semester series. An eclipse in a semester series of solar eclipses repeats approximately every 177 days and 4 hours (a semester) at alternating nodes of the Moon's orbit.

The partial solar eclipses on June 10, 1964 and December 4, 1964 occur in the next lunar year eclipse set.

Solar eclipse series sets from 1961 to 1964
Descending node			Ascending node		
Saros	Map	Gamma	Saros	Map	Gamma
120	February 15, 1961 Total	0.883	125	August 11, 1961 Annular	−0.8859
130	February 5, 1962 Total	0.2107	135	July 31, 1962 Annular	−0.113
140	January 25, 1963 Annular	−0.4898	145	July 20, 1963 Total	0.6571
150	January 14, 1964 Partial	−1.2354	155	July 9, 1964 Partial	1.3623

=== Saros 155 ===
This eclipse is a part of Saros series 155, repeating every 18 years, 11 days, and containing 71 events. The series started with a partial solar eclipse on June 17, 1928. It contains total eclipses from September 12, 2072 through August 30, 2649; hybrid eclipses from September 10, 2667 through October 2, 2703; and annular eclipses from October 13, 2721 through May 8, 3064. The series ends at member 71 as a partial eclipse on July 24, 3190. Its eclipses are tabulated in three columns; every third eclipse in the same column is one exeligmos apart, so they all cast shadows over approximately the same parts of the Earth.

The longest duration of totality will be produced by member 14 at 4 minutes, 5 seconds on November 6, 2162, and the longest duration of annularity will be produced by member 63 at 5 minutes, 31 seconds on April 28, 3046. All eclipses in this series occur at the Moon’s ascending node of orbit.

Series members 1–16 occur between 1928 and 2200:
1	2	3
June 17, 1928	June 29, 1946	July 9, 1964
4	5	6
July 20, 1982	July 31, 2000	August 11, 2018
7	8	9
August 21, 2036	September 2, 2054	September 12, 2072
10	11	12
September 23, 2090	October 5, 2108	October 16, 2126
13	14	15
October 26, 2144	November 7, 2162	November 17, 2180
16
November 28, 2198

=== Metonic series ===
The metonic series repeats eclipses every 19 years (6939.69 days), lasting about 5 cycles. Eclipses occur in nearly the same calendar date. In addition, the octon subseries repeats 1/5 of that or every 3.8 years (1387.94 days). All eclipses in this table occur at the Moon's ascending node.

22 eclipse events between December 2, 1880 and July 9, 1964
December 2–3	September 20–21	July 9–10	April 26–28	February 13–14
111	113	115	117	119
December 2, 1880		July 9, 1888	April 26, 1892	February 13, 1896
121	123	125	127	129
December 3, 1899	September 21, 1903	July 10, 1907	April 28, 1911	February 14, 1915
131	133	135	137	139
December 3, 1918	September 21, 1922	July 9, 1926	April 28, 1930	February 14, 1934
141	143	145	147	149
December 2, 1937	September 21, 1941	July 9, 1945	April 28, 1949	February 14, 1953
151	153	155		
December 2, 1956	September 20, 1960	July 9, 1964		

=== Tritos series ===
This eclipse is a part of a tritos cycle, repeating at alternating nodes every 135 synodic months (≈ 3986.63 days, or 11 years minus 1 month). Their appearance and longitude are irregular due to a lack of synchronization with the anomalistic month (period of perigee), but groupings of 3 tritos cycles (≈ 33 years minus 3 months) come close (≈ 434.044 anomalistic months), so eclipses are similar in these groupings.

Series members between 1801 and 1964
September 17, 1811 (Saros 141)	August 16, 1822 (Saros 142)	July 17, 1833 (Saros 143)	June 16, 1844 (Saros 144)	May 16, 1855 (Saros 145)
April 15, 1866 (Saros 146)	March 15, 1877 (Saros 147)	February 11, 1888 (Saros 148)	January 11, 1899 (Saros 149)	December 12, 1909 (Saros 150)
November 10, 1920 (Saros 151)	October 11, 1931 (Saros 152)	September 10, 1942 (Saros 153)	August 9, 1953 (Saros 154)	July 9, 1964 (Saros 155)

=== Inex series ===
This eclipse is a part of the long period inex cycle, repeating at alternating nodes, every 358 synodic months (≈ 10,571.95 days, or 29 years minus 20 days). Their appearance and longitude are irregular due to a lack of synchronization with the anomalistic month (period of perigee). However, groupings of 3 inex cycles (≈ 87 years minus 2 months) comes close (≈ 1,151.02 anomalistic months), so eclipses are similar in these groupings.

Series members between 1801 and 1964
October 19, 1819 (Saros 150)	September 27, 1848 (Saros 151)	September 7, 1877 (Saros 152)
August 20, 1906 (Saros 153)	July 30, 1935 (Saros 154)	July 9, 1964 (Saros 155)
