= Solar Saros 155 =

Saros cycle series 155 for solar eclipses

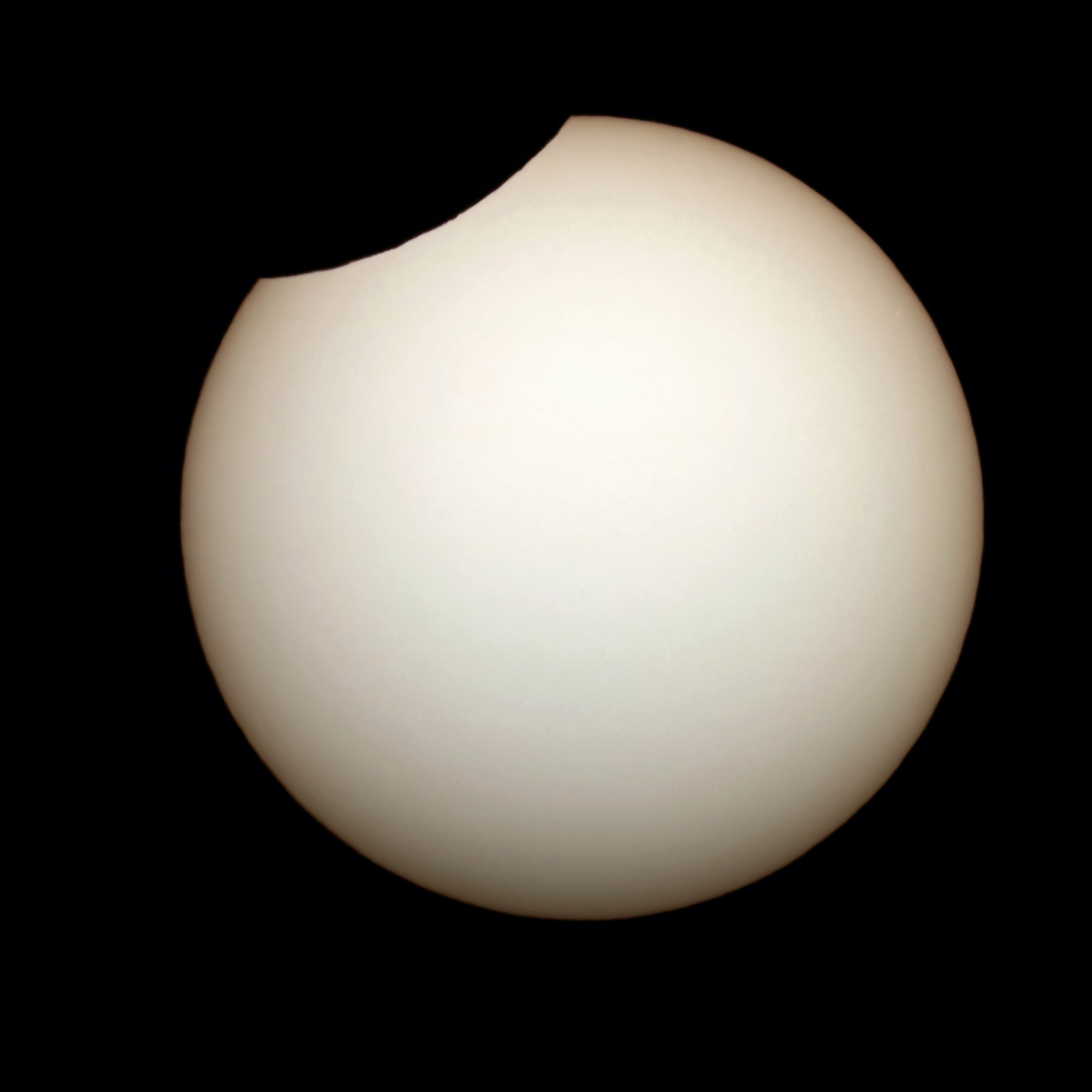
Partial, member 6, August 11, 2018 From Huittinen, Finland

Saros cycle series 155 for solar eclipses occurs at the Moon's ascending node, repeating every 18 years, 11 days, containing 71 eclipses, 56 of which will be umbral (33 total, 3 hybrid, and 20 annular). The first eclipse in the series was on 17 June 1928 and the last will be on 24 July 3190. The most recent eclipse was a partial eclipse on 11 August 2018 and the next will be a partial eclipse on 21 August 2036.

The longest totality will be 4 minutes 5 seconds on 6 November 2162 and the longest annular will be 5 minutes 31 seconds on 28 April 3046.

== Umbral eclipses ==
Umbral eclipses (annular, total and hybrid) can be further classified as either: 1) Central (two limits), 2) Central (one limit) or 3) Non-Central (one limit). The statistical distribution of these classes in Saros series 155 appears in the following table.

Classification	Number	Percent
All Umbral eclipses	56	100.00%
Central (two limits)	55	98.21%
Central (one limit)	0	0.00%
Non-central (one limit)	1	1.79%

== All eclipses ==
Saros	Member	Date	Time (Greatest) UTC	Type	Location Lat, Long	Gamma	Mag.	Width (km)	Duration (min:sec)	Ref
155	1	June 17, 1928	20:27:28	Partial	65.6N 70.6E	1.5107	0.0375			
155	2	June 29, 1946	3:51:58	Partial	66.6N 50.8W	1.4361	0.1802			
155	3	July 9, 1964	11:17:53	Partial	67.6N 172.9W	1.3623	0.3221			
155	4	July 20, 1982	18:44:44	Partial	68.6N 64.2E	1.2886	0.4643			
155	5	July 31, 2000	2:14:08	Partial	69.5N 59.9W	1.2166	0.6034			
155	6	August 11, 2018	9:47:28	Partial	70.4N 174.5E	1.1476	0.7368			
155	7	August 21, 2036	17:25:45	Partial	71.1N 47E	1.0825	0.8622			
155	8	September 1–2, 2054	1:09:34	Partial	71.7N 82.3W	1.0215	0.9793			
155	9	September 12, 2072	8:59:20	Total	69.8N 102E	0.9655	1.0558	732	3m 13s	
155	10	September 23, 2090	16:56:36	Total	60.7N 40.5W	0.9157	1.0562	463	3m 36s	
155	11	October 4–5, 2108	1:01:20	Total	52.5N 172W	0.8722	1.0551	371	3m 50s	
155	12	October 16, 2126	9:12:51	Total	45.3N 58.6E	0.8345	1.0534	319	4m 0s	
155	13	October 26, 2144	17:32:40	Total	39.2N 71.2W	0.8037	1.0512	284	4m 5s	
155	14	November 6–7, 2162	1:59:40	Total	34.1N 158.3E	0.7788	1.0489	258	4m 5s	
155	15	November 17, 2180	10:34:01	Total	30.1N 26.5E	0.7605	1.0465	238	4m 3s	
155	16	November 28, 2198	19:12:46	Total	26.9N 106W	0.7459	1.0442	221	3m 58s	
155	17	December 10, 2216	3:57:52	Total	24.8N 120.2E	0.7367	1.0421	208	3m 51s	
155	18	December 21, 2234	12:46:02	Total	23.5N 14.1W	0.7299	1.0403	197	3m 42s	
155	19	December 31, 2252	21:37:06	Total	23.1N 149.1W	0.7258	1.0389	189	3m 34s	
155	20	January 12, 2271	6:28:08	Total	23.3N 76E	0.7217	1.0379	182	3m 25s	
155	21	January 22, 2289	15:19:25	Total	24.3N 58.9W	0.7181	1.0374	178	3m 18s	
155	22	February 3, 2307	0:08:01	Total	25.7N 166.9E	0.7125	1.0373	176	3m 12s	
155	23	February 14, 2325	8:52:36	Total	27.5N 33.9E	0.7038	1.0378	175	3m 8s	
155	24	February 25, 2343	17:32:18	Total	29.6N 97.7W	0.6913	1.0385	175	3m 6s	
155	25	March 7, 2361	2:05:56	Total	31.9N 132.7E	0.6743	1.0396	176	3m 6s	
155	26	March 19, 2379	10:31:47	Total	34.3N 5.6E	0.6512	1.0409	177	3m 7s	
155	27	March 29, 2397	18:49:52	Total	36.7N 118.9W	0.6221	1.0423	178	3m 11s	
155	28	April 10, 2415	2:59:35	Total	38.9N 119.6E	0.5866	1.0436	178	3m 15s	
155	29	April 20, 2433	11:01:32	Total	40.8N 0.9E	0.545	1.0449	177	3m 21s	
155	30	May 1, 2451	18:53:37	Total	42.1N 114.3W	0.4958	1.0459	175	3m 28s	
155	31	May 11, 2469	2:39:07	Total	42.6N 132.9E	0.4417	1.0466	172	3m 36s	
155	32	May 23, 2487	10:16:15	Total	42.1N 22.6E	0.3811	1.0467	168	3m 43s	
155	33	June 3, 2505	17:48:02	Total	40.5N 86.3W	0.3165	1.0464	163	3m 50s	
155	34	June 14, 2523	1:12:30	Total	37.5N 166.2E	0.2464	1.0453	156	3m 56s	
155	35	June 25, 2541	8:33:57	Total	33.5N 58.6E	0.1743	1.0437	148	3m 58s	
155	36	July 6, 2559	15:50:37	Total	28.4N 48.9W	0.0992	1.0412	139	3m 55s	
155	37	July 16, 2577	23:05:23	Total	22.5N 156.8W	0.023	1.0382	128	3m 47s	
155	38	July 28, 2595	6:18:18	Total	15.8N 94.8E	-0.0539	1.0343	116	3m 30s	
155	39	August 8, 2613	13:32:05	Total	8.7N 14.5W	-0.1292	1.03	102	3m 7s	
155	40	August 19, 2631	20:47:03	Total	1.2N 124.7W	-0.2025	1.0249	86	2m 36s	
155	41	August 30, 2649	4:03:55	Total	6.5S 124.2E	-0.2732	1.0194	69	2m 1s	
155	42	September 10, 2667	11:25:05	Hybrid	14.2S 11.7E	-0.3393	1.0134	49	1m 22s	
155	43	September 20, 2685	18:50:12	Hybrid	22S 101.7W	-0.4011	1.0071	27	0m 42s	
155	44	October 2, 2703	2:21:25	Hybrid	29.6S 143.4E	-0.457	1.0006	2	0m 3s	
155	45	October 13, 2721	9:57:38	Annular	37S 27.6E	-0.5077	0.994	24	0m 34s	
155	46	October 24, 2739	17:41:47	Annular	43.9S 89.4W	-0.551	0.9874	53	1m 8s	
155	47	November 3, 2757	1:31:50	Annular	50.4S 153.2E	-0.5886	0.9811	83	1m 39s	
155	48	November 15, 2775	9:29:02	Annular	56.1S 35.8E	-0.6195	0.975	114	2m 7s	
155	49	November 25, 2793	17:32:25	Annular	60.9S 80.9W	-0.6447	0.9693	145	2m 32s	
155	50	December 6, 2811	1:42:19	Annular	64.3S 163.6E	-0.6641	0.964	175	2m 55s	
155	51	December 17, 2829	9:56:19	Annular	66.1S 49.5E	-0.6793	0.9594	202	3m 15s	
155	52	December 28, 2847	18:13:42	Annular	66.1S 64.7W	-0.6911	0.9552	227	3m 34s	
155	53	January 7, 2866	2:33:07	Annular	64.5S 179.3E	-0.7007	0.9518	248	3m 51s	
155	54	January 19, 2884	10:53:53	Annular	61.7S 60.4E	-0.7088	0.9489	265	4m 7s	
155	55	January 30, 2902	19:12:16	Annular	58.3S 60.1W	-0.7182	0.9466	280	4m 21s	
155	56	February 11, 2920	3:28:36	Annular	54.6S 178.1E	-0.7285	0.9449	293	4m 34s	
155	57	February 21, 2938	11:39:31	Annular	51.1S 56.6E	-0.7427	0.9436	306	4m 46s	
155	58	March 3, 2956	19:46:05	Annular	47.8S 64.6W	-0.7598	0.9428	318	4m 57s	
155	59	March 15, 2974	3:43:12	Annular	45.4S 176.4E	-0.7841	0.9422	335	5m 7s	
155	60	March 25, 2992	11:34:16	Annular	43.8S 58.8E	-0.8128	0.9419	358	5m 17s	
155	61	April 6, 3010	19:14:31	Annular	43.5S 55.9W	-0.8494	0.9415	398	5m 25s	
155	62	April 16, 3028	2:47:00	Annular	44.9S 168.2W	-0.8919	0.9411	469	5m 30s	
155	63	April 28, 3046	10:07:53	Annular	49.2S 83.9E	-0.9431	0.9399	660	5m 31s	
155	64	May 8, 3064	17:21:18	Annular (Note: Non-central)	62.6S 7.7W	-0.9997	0.9639			
155	65	May 19, 3082	0:24:26	Partial	63.4S 122.0W	-1.0640	0.8539			
155	66	May 31, 3100	7:19:28	Partial	64.3S 125.4E	-1.1341	0.7339			
155	67	June 11, 3118	14:06:32	Partial	65.2S 14.6E	-1.2095	0.6044			
155	68	June 21, 3136	20:47:51	Partial	66.2S 95.2W	-1.2886	0.4685			
155	69	July 3, 3154	3:23:41	Partial	67.2S 156.0E	-1.3714	0.3265			
155	70	July 13, 3172	9:55:26	Partial	68.2S 47.7E	-1.4563	0.1808			
155	71	July 24, 3190	16:25:00	Partial	69.2S 60.6W	-1.5419	0.0342			
