= Solar eclipse of July 20, 1982 =

20th-century partial solar eclipse

- Partial eclipse
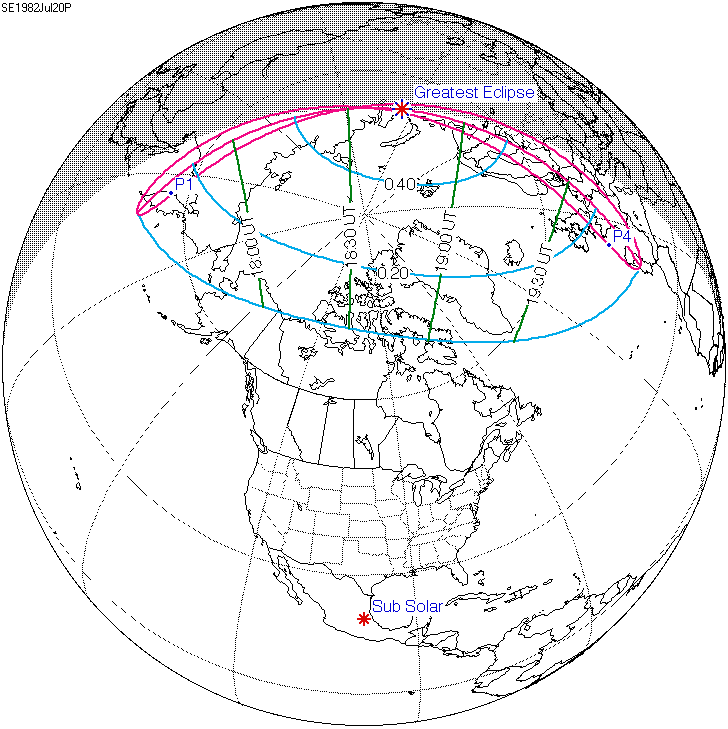
- Map
- Gamma: 1.2886
- Magnitude: 0.4643

Maximum eclipse
- Coordinates: 68.6°N 64.2°E

Times (UTC)
- Greatest eclipse: 18:44:44

References
- Saros: 155 (4 of 71)
- Catalog # (SE5000): 9469

A partial solar eclipse occurred at the Moon's ascending node of orbit on Tuesday, July 20, 1982, with a magnitude of 0.4643. A solar eclipse occurs when the Moon passes between Earth and the Sun, thereby totally or partly obscuring the image of the Sun for a viewer on Earth. A partial solar eclipse occurs in the polar regions of the Earth when the center of the Moon's shadow misses the Earth.

This was the third of four partial solar eclipses in 1982, with the others occurring on January 25, June 21, and December 15.

A partial eclipse was visible for parts of the northern Soviet Union, northern Alaska, northern Canada, Greenland, and Northern Europe.

== Eclipse details ==
Shown below are two tables displaying details about this particular solar eclipse. The first table outlines times at which the Moon's penumbra or umbra attains the specific parameter, and the second table describes various other parameters pertaining to this eclipse.

July 20, 1982 Solar Eclipse Times
Event	Time (UTC)
First Penumbral External Contact	1982 July 20 at 17:19:36.7 UTC
Equatorial Conjunction	1982 July 20 at 18:30:56.4 UTC
Greatest Eclipse	1982 July 20 at 18:44:43.8 UTC
Ecliptic Conjunction	1982 July 20 at 18:57:30.7 UTC
Last Penumbral External Contact	1982 July 20 at 20:09:59.1 UTC

July 20, 1982 Solar Eclipse Parameters
Parameter	Value
Eclipse Magnitude	0.46434
Eclipse Obscuration	0.35755
Gamma	1.28859
Sun Right Ascension	07h59m09.9s
Sun Declination	+20°37'14.1"
Sun Semi-Diameter	15'44.4"
Sun Equatorial Horizontal Parallax	08.7"
Moon Right Ascension	07h59m44.7s
Moon Declination	+21°55'14.5"
Moon Semi-Diameter	16'37.4"
Moon Equatorial Horizontal Parallax	1°01'00.4"
ΔT	52.6 s

== Eclipse season ==
This eclipse is part of an eclipse season, a period, roughly every six months, when eclipses occur. Only two (or occasionally three) eclipse seasons occur each year, and each season lasts about 35 days and repeats just short of six months (173 days) later; thus two full eclipse seasons always occur each year. Either two or three eclipses happen each eclipse season. In the sequence below, each eclipse is separated by a fortnight. The first and last eclipse in this sequence is separated by one synodic month.

Eclipse season of June–July 1982
June 21 Ascending node (new moon)	July 6 Descending node (full moon)	July 20 Ascending node (new moon)
Partial solar eclipse Solar Saros 117	Total lunar eclipse Lunar Saros 129	Partial solar eclipse Solar Saros 155

== Related eclipses ==
=== Eclipses in 1982 ===
- A total lunar eclipse on January 9.
- A partial solar eclipse on January 25.
- A partial solar eclipse on June 21.
- A total lunar eclipse on July 6.
- A partial solar eclipse on July 20.
- A partial solar eclipse on December 15.
- A total lunar eclipse on December 30.

=== Metonic ===
- Preceded by: Solar eclipse of October 2, 1978

=== Tzolkinex ===
- Followed by: Solar eclipse of August 31, 1989

=== Half-Saros ===
- Preceded by: Lunar eclipse of July 15, 1973
- Followed by: Lunar eclipse of July 26, 1991

=== Tritos ===
- Preceded by: Solar eclipse of August 20, 1971

=== Solar Saros 155 ===
- Preceded by: Solar eclipse of July 9, 1964
- Followed by: Solar eclipse of July 31, 2000

=== Inex ===
- Preceded by: Solar eclipse of August 9, 1953
- Followed by: Solar eclipse of July 1, 2011

=== Triad ===
- Preceded by: Solar eclipse of September 18, 1895
- Followed by: Solar eclipse of May 20, 2069

=== Solar eclipses of 1979–1982 ===
This eclipse is a member of a semester series. An eclipse in a semester series of solar eclipses repeats approximately every 177 days and 4 hours (a semester) at alternating nodes of the Moon's orbit.

The partial solar eclipses on June 21, 1982 and December 15, 1982 occur in the next lunar year eclipse set.

Solar eclipse series sets from 1979 to 1982
Descending node			Ascending node		
Saros	Map	Gamma	Saros	Map	Gamma
120 Totality in Brandon, MB, Canada	February 26, 1979 Total	0.8981	125	August 22, 1979 Annular	−0.9632
130	February 16, 1980 Total	0.2224	135	August 10, 1980 Annular	−0.1915
140	February 4, 1981 Annular	−0.4838	145	July 31, 1981 Total	0.5792
150	January 25, 1982 Partial	−1.2311	155	July 20, 1982 Partial	1.2886

=== Saros 155 ===
This eclipse is a part of Saros series 155, repeating every 18 years, 11 days, and containing 71 events. The series started with a partial solar eclipse on June 17, 1928. It contains total eclipses from September 12, 2072 through August 30, 2649; hybrid eclipses from September 10, 2667 through October 2, 2703; and annular eclipses from October 13, 2721 through May 8, 3064. The series ends at member 71 as a partial eclipse on July 24, 3190. Its eclipses are tabulated in three columns; every third eclipse in the same column is one exeligmos apart, so they all cast shadows over approximately the same parts of the Earth.

The longest duration of totality will be produced by member 14 at 4 minutes, 5 seconds on November 6, 2162, and the longest duration of annularity will be produced by member 63 at 5 minutes, 31 seconds on April 28, 3046. All eclipses in this series occur at the Moon’s ascending node of orbit.

Series members 1–16 occur between 1928 and 2200:
1	2	3
June 17, 1928	June 29, 1946	July 9, 1964
4	5	6
July 20, 1982	July 31, 2000	August 11, 2018
7	8	9
August 21, 2036	September 2, 2054	September 12, 2072
10	11	12
September 23, 2090	October 5, 2108	October 16, 2126
13	14	15
October 26, 2144	November 7, 2162	November 17, 2180
16
November 28, 2198

=== Metonic series ===
The metonic series repeats eclipses every 19 years (6939.69 days), lasting about 5 cycles. Eclipses occur in nearly the same calendar date. In addition, the octon subseries repeats 1/5 of that or every 3.8 years (1387.94 days). All eclipses in this table occur at the Moon's ascending node.

22 eclipse events between December 13, 1898 and July 20, 1982
December 13–14	October 1–2	July 20–21	May 9	February 24–25
111	113	115	117	119
December 13, 1898		July 21, 1906	May 9, 1910	February 25, 1914
121	123	125	127	129
December 14, 1917	October 1, 1921	July 20, 1925	May 9, 1929	February 24, 1933
131	133	135	137	139
December 13, 1936	October 1, 1940	July 20, 1944	May 9, 1948	February 25, 1952
141	143	145	147	149
December 14, 1955	October 2, 1959	July 20, 1963	May 9, 1967	February 25, 1971
151	153	155		
December 13, 1974	October 2, 1978	July 20, 1982		

=== Tritos series ===
This eclipse is a part of a tritos cycle, repeating at alternating nodes every 135 synodic months (≈ 3986.63 days, or 11 years minus 1 month). Their appearance and longitude are irregular due to a lack of synchronization with the anomalistic month (period of perigee), but groupings of 3 tritos cycles (≈ 33 years minus 3 months) come close (≈ 434.044 anomalistic months), so eclipses are similar in these groupings.

Series members between 1801 and 1982
November 29, 1807 (Saros 139)	October 29, 1818 (Saros 140)	September 28, 1829 (Saros 141)	August 27, 1840 (Saros 142)	July 28, 1851 (Saros 143)
June 27, 1862 (Saros 144)	May 26, 1873 (Saros 145)	April 25, 1884 (Saros 146)	March 26, 1895 (Saros 147)	February 23, 1906 (Saros 148)
January 23, 1917 (Saros 149)	December 24, 1927 (Saros 150)	November 21, 1938 (Saros 151)	October 21, 1949 (Saros 152)	September 20, 1960 (Saros 153)
August 20, 1971 (Saros 154)	July 20, 1982 (Saros 155)			

=== Inex series ===
This eclipse is a part of the long period inex cycle, repeating at alternating nodes, every 358 synodic months (≈ 10,571.95 days, or 29 years minus 20 days). Their appearance and longitude are irregular due to a lack of synchronization with the anomalistic month (period of perigee). However, groupings of 3 inex cycles (≈ 87 years minus 2 months) comes close (≈ 1,151.02 anomalistic months), so eclipses are similar in these groupings.

Series members between 1801 and 2069
November 18, 1808 (Saros 149)	October 29, 1837 (Saros 150)	October 8, 1866 (Saros 151)
September 18, 1895 (Saros 152)	August 30, 1924 (Saros 153)	August 9, 1953 (Saros 154)
July 20, 1982 (Saros 155)	July 1, 2011 (Saros 156)	
May 20, 2069 (Saros 158)		
