= Solar eclipse of April 16, 1893 =

Total eclipse

- Total eclipse
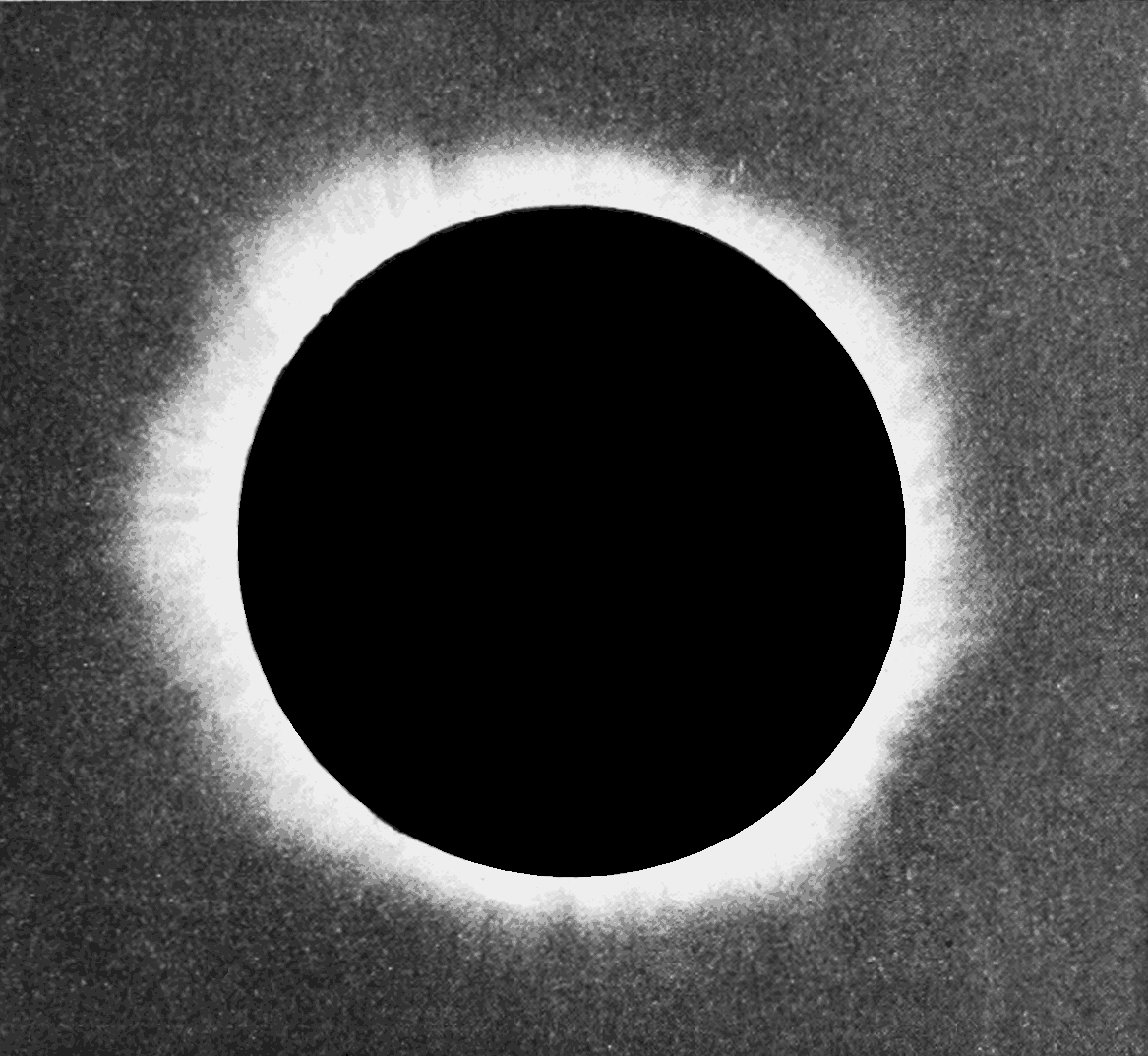
- Corona as viewed from Mina Los Bronces, Región de Atacama, Chile

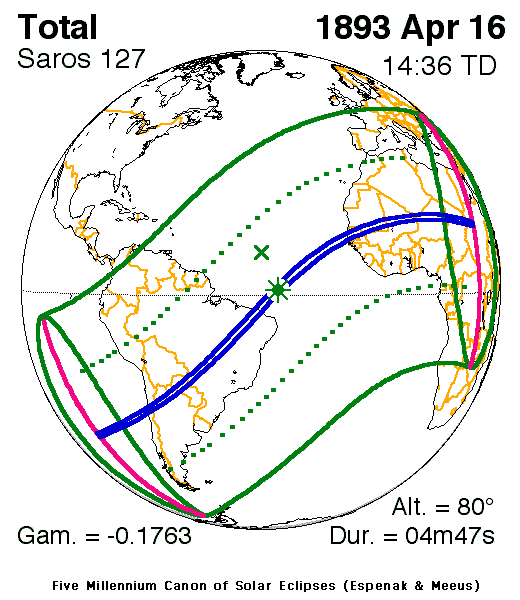
- Map
- Gamma: −0.1764
- Magnitude: 1.0556

Maximum eclipse
- Duration: 287 s (4 min 47 s)
- Coordinates: 1.3°N 34.6°W
- Max. width of band: 186 km (116 mi)

Times (UTC)
- Greatest eclipse: 14:36:11

References
- Saros: 127 (51 of 82)
- Catalog # (SE5000): 9264

A total solar eclipse occurred at the Moon's ascending node of orbit on Sunday, April 16, 1893, with a magnitude of 1.0556. A solar eclipse occurs when the Moon passes between Earth and the Sun, thereby totally or partly obscuring the image of the Sun for a viewer on Earth. A total solar eclipse occurs when the Moon's apparent diameter is larger than the Sun's, blocking all direct sunlight, turning day into darkness. Totality occurs in a narrow path across Earth's surface, with the partial solar eclipse visible over a surrounding region thousands of kilometres wide. Occurring about 1.3 days before perigee (on April 17, 1893, at 21:50 UTC), the Moon's apparent diameter was larger.

The path of totality was visible from parts of the modern-day countries of Chile, Argentina, Paraguay, Brazil, Senegal, Mauritania, Mali, southern Algeria, Niger, Chad, and Sudan. A partial solar eclipse was also visible for parts of South America, Africa, and Southern Europe.

== Observations ==
John Martin Schaeberle observed the eclipse and made drawings of the Corona:

| Predicted by Schaeberle | Observed by Schaeberle |
Observed by Schaeberle

Schaeberle also discovered a comet like object on images of the eclipse taken from Chile.The comet was 0.8 Moon diameters from the Moon

== Eclipse details ==
Shown below are two tables displaying details about this particular solar eclipse. The first table outlines times at which the Moon's penumbra or umbra attains the specific parameter, and the second table describes various other parameters pertaining to this eclipse.

April 16, 1893 Solar Eclipse Times
| Event | Time (UTC) |
|---|---|
| First Penumbral External Contact | 1893 April 16 at 11:57:24.1 UTC |
| First Umbral External Contact | 1893 April 16 at 12:52:48.9 UTC |
| First Central Line | 1893 April 16 at 12:53:50.7 UTC |
| First Umbral Internal Contact | 1893 April 16 at 12:54:52.6 UTC |
| First Penumbral Internal Contact | 1893 April 16 at 13:51:45.5 UTC |
| Equatorial Conjunction | 1893 April 16 at 14:26:54.0 UTC |
| Ecliptic Conjunction | 1893 April 16 at 14:34:21.8 UTC |
| Greatest Eclipse | 1893 April 16 at 14:36:11.0 UTC |
| Greatest Duration | 1893 April 16 at 14:42:16.8 UTC |
| Last Penumbral Internal Contact | 1893 April 16 at 15:20:49.8 UTC |
| Last Umbral Internal Contact | 1893 April 16 at 16:17:33.4 UTC |
| Last Central Line | 1893 April 16 at 16:18:36.8 UTC |
| Last Umbral External Contact | 1893 April 16 at 16:19:40.1 UTC |
| Last Penumbral External Contact | 1893 April 16 at 17:14:58.4 UTC |

April 16, 1893 Solar Eclipse Parameters
| Parameter | Value |
|---|---|
| Eclipse Magnitude | 1.05562 |
| Eclipse Obscuration | 1.11434 |
| Gamma | −0.17634 |
| Sun Right Ascension | 01h39m29.7s |
| Sun Declination | +10°20'33.9" |
| Sun Semi-Diameter | 15'55.5" |
| Sun Equatorial Horizontal Parallax | 08.8" |
| Moon Right Ascension | 01h39m49.3s |
| Moon Declination | +10°11'02.4" |
| Moon Semi-Diameter | 16'32.0" |
| Moon Equatorial Horizontal Parallax | 1°00'40.6" |
| ΔT | -6.4 s |

== Eclipse season ==
This eclipse is part of an eclipse season, a period, roughly every six months, when eclipses occur. Only two (or occasionally three) eclipse seasons occur each year, and each season lasts about 35 days and repeats just short of six months (173 days) later; thus two full eclipse seasons always occur each year. Either two or three eclipses happen each eclipse season. In the sequence below, each eclipse is separated by a fortnight.

Eclipse season of April 1893
| April 16 Ascending node (new moon) | April 30 Descending node (full moon) |
|---|---|
| Total solar eclipse Solar Saros 127 | Penumbral lunar eclipse Lunar Saros 139 |

== Related eclipses ==
=== Eclipses in 1893 ===
- A total solar eclipse on April 16.
- A penumbral lunar eclipse on April 30.
- A penumbral lunar eclipse on September 25.
- An annular solar eclipse on October 9.
- A penumbral lunar eclipse on October 25.

=== Metonic ===
- Preceded by: Solar eclipse of June 28, 1889
- Followed by: Solar eclipse of February 1, 1897

=== Tzolkinex ===
- Preceded by: Solar eclipse of March 5, 1886
- Followed by: Solar eclipse of May 28, 1900

=== Half-Saros ===
- Preceded by: Lunar eclipse of April 10, 1884
- Followed by: Lunar eclipse of April 22, 1902

=== Tritos ===
- Preceded by: Solar eclipse of May 17, 1882
- Followed by: Solar eclipse of March 17, 1904

=== Solar Saros 127 ===
- Preceded by: Solar eclipse of April 6, 1875
- Followed by: Solar eclipse of April 28, 1911

=== Inex ===
- Preceded by: Solar eclipse of May 6, 1864
- Followed by: Solar eclipse of March 28, 1922

=== Triad ===
- Preceded by: Solar eclipse of June 16, 1806
- Followed by: Solar eclipse of February 16, 1980

=== Solar eclipses of 1892–1895 ===
This eclipse is a member of a semester series. An eclipse in a semester series of solar eclipses repeats approximately every 177 days and 4 hours (a semester) at alternating nodes of the Moon's orbit.

The partial solar eclipse on August 20, 1895 occurs in the next lunar year eclipse set.

Solar eclipse series sets from 1892 to 1895
| Ascending node | | | Descending node | | |
| Saros | Map | Gamma | Saros | Map | Gamma |
| 117 | April 26, 1892 Total | −0.8870 | 122 | October 20, 1892 Partial | 1.0286 |
| 127 | April 16, 1893 Total | −0.1764 | 132 | October 9, 1893 Annular | 0.2866 |
| 137 | April 6, 1894 Hybrid | 0.5740 | 142 | September 29, 1894 Total | −0.4573 |
| 147 | March 26, 1895 Partial | 1.3565 | 152 | September 18, 1895 Partial | −1.1469 |

=== Saros 127 ===
This eclipse is a part of Saros series 127, repeating every 18 years, 11 days, and containing 82 events. The series started with a partial solar eclipse on October 10, 991 AD. It contains total eclipses from May 14, 1352 through August 15, 2091. There are no annular or hybrid eclipses in this set. The series ends at member 82 as a partial eclipse on March 21, 2452. Its eclipses are tabulated in three columns; every third eclipse in the same column is one exeligmos apart, so they all cast shadows over approximately the same parts of the Earth.

The longest duration of totality was produced by member 31 at 5 minutes, 40 seconds on August 30, 1532. All eclipses in this series occur at the Moon’s ascending node of orbit.

Series members 46–68 occur between 1801 and 2200:
| 46 | 47 | 48 |
|---|---|---|
| February 21, 1803 | March 4, 1821 | March 15, 1839 |
| 49 | 50 | 51 |
| March 25, 1857 | April 6, 1875 | April 16, 1893 |
| 52 | 53 | 54 |
| April 28, 1911 | May 9, 1929 | May 20, 1947 |
| 55 | 56 | 57 |
| May 30, 1965 | June 11, 1983 | June 21, 2001 |
| 58 | 59 | 60 |
| July 2, 2019 | July 13, 2037 | July 24, 2055 |
| 61 | 62 | 63 |
| August 3, 2073 | August 15, 2091 | August 26, 2109 |
| 64 | 65 | 66 |
| September 6, 2127 | September 16, 2145 | September 28, 2163 |
| 67 | 68 | |
| October 8, 2181 | October 19, 2199 | |

=== Metonic series ===
The metonic series repeats eclipses every 19 years (6939.69 days), lasting about 5 cycles. Eclipses occur in nearly the same calendar date. In addition, the octon subseries repeats 1/5 of that or every 3.8 years (1387.94 days). All eclipses in this table occur at the Moon's ascending node.

23 eclipse events between February 3, 1859 and June 29, 1946
| February 1–3 | November 21–22 | September 8–10 | June 28–29 | April 16–18 |
| 109 | 111 | 113 | 115 | 117 |
|---|---|---|---|---|
| February 3, 1859 | November 21, 1862 | | June 28, 1870 | April 16, 1874 |
| 119 | 121 | 123 | 125 | 127 |
| February 2, 1878 | November 21, 1881 | September 8, 1885 | June 28, 1889 | April 16, 1893 |
| 129 | 131 | 133 | 135 | 137 |
| February 1, 1897 | November 22, 1900 | September 9, 1904 | June 28, 1908 | April 17, 1912 |
| 139 | 141 | 143 | 145 | 147 |
| February 3, 1916 | November 22, 1919 | September 10, 1923 | June 29, 1927 | April 18, 1931 |
| 149 | 151 | 153 | 155 | |
| February 3, 1935 | November 21, 1938 | September 10, 1942 | June 29, 1946 | |

=== Tritos series ===
This eclipse is a part of a tritos cycle, repeating at alternating nodes every 135 synodic months (≈ 3986.63 days, or 11 years minus 1 month). Their appearance and longitude are irregular due to a lack of synchronization with the anomalistic month (period of perigee), but groupings of 3 tritos cycles (≈ 33 years minus 3 months) come close (≈ 434.044 anomalistic months), so eclipses are similar in these groupings.

Series members between 1801 and 2200
| December 21, 1805 (Saros 119) | November 19, 1816 (Saros 120) | October 20, 1827 (Saros 121) | September 18, 1838 (Saros 122) | August 18, 1849 (Saros 123) |
| July 18, 1860 (Saros 124) | June 18, 1871 (Saros 125) | May 17, 1882 (Saros 126) | April 16, 1893 (Saros 127) | March 17, 1904 (Saros 128) |
| February 14, 1915 (Saros 129) | January 14, 1926 (Saros 130) | December 13, 1936 (Saros 131) | November 12, 1947 (Saros 132) | October 12, 1958 (Saros 133) |
| September 11, 1969 (Saros 134) | August 10, 1980 (Saros 135) | July 11, 1991 (Saros 136) | June 10, 2002 (Saros 137) | May 10, 2013 (Saros 138) |
| April 8, 2024 (Saros 139) | March 9, 2035 (Saros 140) | February 5, 2046 (Saros 141) | January 5, 2057 (Saros 142) | December 6, 2067 (Saros 143) |
| November 4, 2078 (Saros 144) | October 4, 2089 (Saros 145) | September 4, 2100 (Saros 146) | August 4, 2111 (Saros 147) | July 4, 2122 (Saros 148) |
| June 3, 2133 (Saros 149) | May 3, 2144 (Saros 150) | April 2, 2155 (Saros 151) | March 2, 2166 (Saros 152) | January 29, 2177 (Saros 153) |
| December 29, 2187 (Saros 154) | November 28, 2198 (Saros 155) | | | |

=== Inex series ===
This eclipse is a part of the long period inex cycle, repeating at alternating nodes, every 358 synodic months (≈ 10,571.95 days, or 29 years minus 20 days). Their appearance and longitude are irregular due to a lack of synchronization with the anomalistic month (period of perigee). However, groupings of 3 inex cycles (≈ 87 years minus 2 months) comes close (≈ 1,151.02 anomalistic months), so eclipses are similar in these groupings.

Series members between 1801 and 2200
| June 16, 1806 (Saros 124) | May 27, 1835 (Saros 125) | May 6, 1864 (Saros 126) |
| April 16, 1893 (Saros 127) | March 28, 1922 (Saros 128) | March 7, 1951 (Saros 129) |
| February 16, 1980 (Saros 130) | January 26, 2009 (Saros 131) | January 5, 2038 (Saros 132) |
| December 17, 2066 (Saros 133) | November 27, 2095 (Saros 134) | November 6, 2124 (Saros 135) |
| October 17, 2153 (Saros 136) | September 27, 2182 (Saros 137) | |
