= Solar eclipse of July 10, 1907 =

20th-century annular solar eclipse

- Annular eclipse
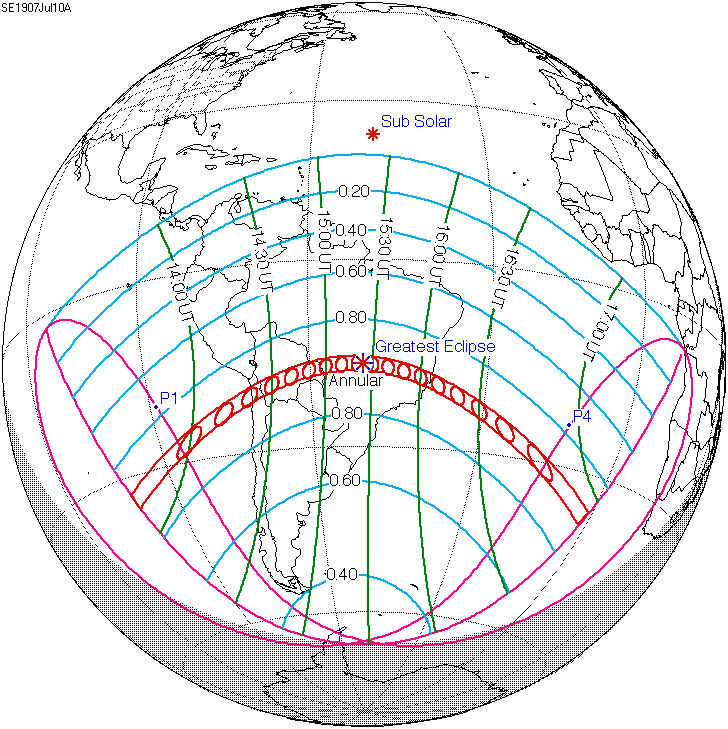
- Map
- Gamma: −0.6313
- Magnitude: 0.9456

Maximum eclipse
- Duration: 443 s (7 min 23 s)
- Coordinates: 16.9°S 50.9°W
- Max. width of band: 258 km (160 mi)

Times (UTC)
- Greatest eclipse: 15:24:32

References
- Saros: 125 (48 of 73)
- Catalog # (SE5000): 9298

An annular solar eclipse occurred at the Moon's ascending node of orbit on Wednesday, July 10, 1907, with a magnitude of 0.9456. A solar eclipse occurs when the Moon passes between Earth and the Sun, thereby totally or partly obscuring the image of the Sun for a viewer on Earth. An annular solar eclipse occurs when the Moon's apparent diameter is smaller than the Sun's, blocking most of the Sun's light and causing the Sun to look like an annulus (ring). An annular eclipse appears as a partial eclipse over a region of the Earth thousands of kilometres wide. Occurring about 17 hours after apogee (on July 9, 1907, at 22:20 UTC), the Moon's apparent diameter was smaller.

Annularity was visible from Chile, Bolivia (including its capital Sucre), and Brazil. A partial eclipse was visible for most of South America and parts of southern Central America.

== Eclipse details ==
Shown below are two tables displaying details about this particular solar eclipse. The first table outlines times at which the Moon's penumbra or umbra attains the specific parameter, and the second table describes various other parameters pertaining to this eclipse.

July 10, 1907 Solar Eclipse Times
Event	Time (UTC)
First Penumbral External Contact	1907 July 10 at 12:34:39.3 UTC
First Umbral External Contact	1907 July 10 at 13:49:46.3 UTC
First Central Line	1907 July 10 at 13:52:42.4 UTC
First Umbral Internal Contact	1907 July 10 at 13:55:40.8 UTC
Ecliptic Conjunction	1907 July 10 at 15:17:01.9 UTC
Greatest Duration	1907 July 10 at 15:23:22.5 UTC
Greatest Eclipse	1907 July 10 at 15:24:32.3 UTC
Equatorial Conjunction	1907 July 10 at 15:26:36.7 UTC
Last Umbral Internal Contact	1907 July 10 at 16:53:22.7 UTC
Last Central Line	1907 July 10 at 16:56:20.7 UTC
Last Umbral External Contact	1907 July 10 at 16:59:16.4 UTC
Last Penumbral External Contact	1907 July 10 at 18:14:23.5 UTC

July 10, 1907 Solar Eclipse Parameters
Parameter	Value
Eclipse Magnitude	0.94562
Eclipse Obscuration	0.89421
Gamma	−0.63126
Sun Right Ascension	07h14m35.6s
Sun Declination	+22°20'34.4"
Sun Semi-Diameter	15'43.9"
Sun Equatorial Horizontal Parallax	08.6"
Moon Right Ascension	07h14m31.5s
Moon Declination	+21°46'36.5"
Moon Semi-Diameter	14'42.3"
Moon Equatorial Horizontal Parallax	0°53'58.2"
ΔT	6.9 s

== Eclipse season ==
This eclipse is part of an eclipse season, a period, roughly every six months, when eclipses occur. Only two (or occasionally three) eclipse seasons occur each year, and each season lasts about 35 days and repeats just short of six months (173 days) later; thus two full eclipse seasons always occur each year. Either two or three eclipses happen each eclipse season. In the sequence below, each eclipse is separated by a fortnight.

Eclipse season of July 1907
July 10 Ascending node (new moon)	July 25 Descending node (full moon)
Annular solar eclipse Solar Saros 125	Partial lunar eclipse Lunar Saros 137

== Related eclipses ==
=== Eclipses in 1907 ===
- A total solar eclipse on January 14.
- A partial lunar eclipse on January 29.
- An annular solar eclipse on July 10.
- A partial lunar eclipse on July 25.

=== Metonic ===
- Preceded by: Solar eclipse of September 21, 1903
- Followed by: Solar eclipse of April 28, 1911

=== Tzolkinex ===
- Preceded by: Solar eclipse of May 28, 1900
- Followed by: Solar eclipse of August 21, 1914

=== Half-Saros ===
- Preceded by: Lunar eclipse of July 3, 1898
- Followed by: Lunar eclipse of July 15, 1916

=== Tritos ===
- Preceded by: Solar eclipse of August 9, 1896
- Followed by: Solar eclipse of June 8, 1918

=== Solar Saros 125 ===
- Preceded by: Solar eclipse of June 28, 1889
- Followed by: Solar eclipse of July 20, 1925

=== Inex ===
- Preceded by: Solar eclipse of July 29, 1878
- Followed by: Solar eclipse of June 19, 1936

=== Triad ===
- Preceded by: Solar eclipse of September 7, 1820
- Followed by: Solar eclipse of May 10, 1994

=== Solar eclipses of 1906–1909 ===
This eclipse is a member of a semester series. An eclipse in a semester series of solar eclipses repeats approximately every 177 days and 4 hours (a semester) at alternating nodes of the Moon's orbit.

The partial solar eclipses on February 23, 1906 and August 20, 1906 occur in the previous lunar year eclipse set.

Solar eclipse series sets from 1906 to 1909
Ascending node			Descending node		
Saros	Map	Gamma	Saros	Map	Gamma
115	July 21, 1906 Partial	−1.3637	120	January 14, 1907 Total	0.8628
125	July 10, 1907 Annular	−0.6313	130	January 3, 1908 Total	0.1934
135	June 28, 1908 Annular	0.1389	140	December 23, 1908 Hybrid	−0.4985
145	June 17, 1909 Hybrid	0.8957	150	December 12, 1909 Partial	−1.2456

=== Saros 125 ===
This eclipse is a part of Saros series 125, repeating every 18 years, 11 days, and containing 73 events. The series started with a partial solar eclipse on February 4, 1060. It contains total eclipses from June 13, 1276 through July 16, 1330; hybrid eclipses on July 26, 1348 and August 7, 1366; and annular eclipses from August 17, 1384 through August 22, 1979. The series ends at member 73 as a partial eclipse on April 9, 2358. Its eclipses are tabulated in three columns; every third eclipse in the same column is one exeligmos apart, so they all cast shadows over approximately the same parts of the Earth.

The longest duration of totality was produced by member 14 at 1 minutes, 11 seconds on June 25, 1294, and the longest duration of annularity was produced by member 48 at 7 minutes, 23 seconds on July 10, 1907. All eclipses in this series occur at the Moon’s ascending node of orbit.

Series members 43–64 occur between 1801 and 2200:
43	44	45
May 16, 1817	May 27, 1835	June 6, 1853
46	47	48
June 18, 1871	June 28, 1889	July 10, 1907
49	50	51
July 20, 1925	August 1, 1943	August 11, 1961
52	53	54
August 22, 1979	September 2, 1997	September 13, 2015
55	56	57
September 23, 2033	October 4, 2051	October 15, 2069
58	59	60
October 26, 2087	November 6, 2105	November 18, 2123
61	62	63
November 28, 2141	December 9, 2159	December 20, 2177
64
December 31, 2195

=== Metonic series ===
The metonic series repeats eclipses every 19 years (6939.69 days), lasting about 5 cycles. Eclipses occur in nearly the same calendar date. In addition, the octon subseries repeats 1/5 of that or every 3.8 years (1387.94 days). All eclipses in this table occur at the Moon's ascending node.

22 eclipse events between December 2, 1880 and July 9, 1964
December 2–3	September 20–21	July 9–10	April 26–28	February 13–14
111	113	115	117	119
December 2, 1880		July 9, 1888	April 26, 1892	February 13, 1896
121	123	125	127	129
December 3, 1899	September 21, 1903	July 10, 1907	April 28, 1911	February 14, 1915
131	133	135	137	139
December 3, 1918	September 21, 1922	July 9, 1926	April 28, 1930	February 14, 1934
141	143	145	147	149
December 2, 1937	September 21, 1941	July 9, 1945	April 28, 1949	February 14, 1953
151	153	155		
December 2, 1956	September 20, 1960	July 9, 1964		

=== Tritos series ===
This eclipse is a part of a tritos cycle, repeating at alternating nodes every 135 synodic months (≈ 3986.63 days, or 11 years minus 1 month). Their appearance and longitude are irregular due to a lack of synchronization with the anomalistic month (period of perigee), but groupings of 3 tritos cycles (≈ 33 years minus 3 months) come close (≈ 434.044 anomalistic months), so eclipses are similar in these groupings.

Series members between 1801 and 2200
April 14, 1809 (Saros 116)	March 14, 1820 (Saros 117)	February 12, 1831 (Saros 118)	January 11, 1842 (Saros 119)	December 11, 1852 (Saros 120)
November 11, 1863 (Saros 121)	October 10, 1874 (Saros 122)	September 8, 1885 (Saros 123)	August 9, 1896 (Saros 124)	July 10, 1907 (Saros 125)
June 8, 1918 (Saros 126)	May 9, 1929 (Saros 127)	April 7, 1940 (Saros 128)	March 7, 1951 (Saros 129)	February 5, 1962 (Saros 130)
January 4, 1973 (Saros 131)	December 4, 1983 (Saros 132)	November 3, 1994 (Saros 133)	October 3, 2005 (Saros 134)	September 1, 2016 (Saros 135)
August 2, 2027 (Saros 136)	July 2, 2038 (Saros 137)	May 31, 2049 (Saros 138)	April 30, 2060 (Saros 139)	March 31, 2071 (Saros 140)
February 27, 2082 (Saros 141)	January 27, 2093 (Saros 142)	December 29, 2103 (Saros 143)	November 27, 2114 (Saros 144)	October 26, 2125 (Saros 145)
September 26, 2136 (Saros 146)	August 26, 2147 (Saros 147)	July 25, 2158 (Saros 148)	June 25, 2169 (Saros 149)	May 24, 2180 (Saros 150)
April 23, 2191 (Saros 151)

=== Inex series ===
This eclipse is a part of the long period inex cycle, repeating at alternating nodes, every 358 synodic months (≈ 10,571.95 days, or 29 years minus 20 days). Their appearance and longitude are irregular due to a lack of synchronization with the anomalistic month (period of perigee). However, groupings of 3 inex cycles (≈ 87 years minus 2 months) comes close (≈ 1,151.02 anomalistic months), so eclipses are similar in these groupings.

Series members between 1801 and 2200
September 7, 1820 (Saros 122)	August 18, 1849 (Saros 123)	July 29, 1878 (Saros 124)
July 10, 1907 (Saros 125)	June 19, 1936 (Saros 126)	May 30, 1965 (Saros 127)
May 10, 1994 (Saros 128)	April 20, 2023 (Saros 129)	March 30, 2052 (Saros 130)
March 10, 2081 (Saros 131)	February 18, 2110 (Saros 132)	January 30, 2139 (Saros 133)
January 10, 2168 (Saros 134)	December 19, 2196 (Saros 135)	
