= Solar eclipse of September 10, 1942 =

20th-century partial solar eclipse

- Partial eclipse
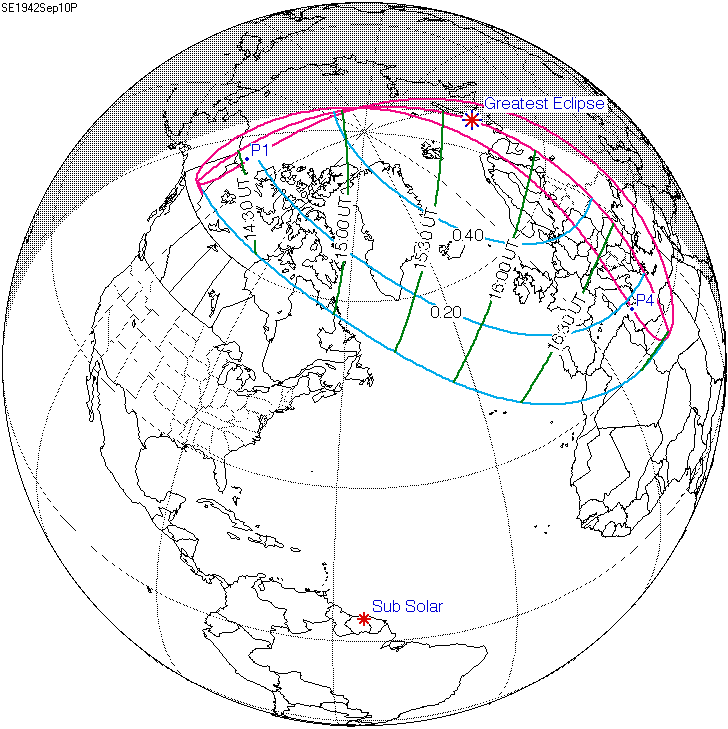
- Map
- Gamma: 1.2571
- Magnitude: 0.523

Maximum eclipse
- Coordinates: 71.9°N 50°E

Times (UTC)
- Greatest eclipse: 15:39:32

References
- Saros: 153 (5 of 70)
- Catalog # (SE5000): 9380

A partial solar eclipse occurred at the Moon's ascending node of orbit on Thursday, September 10, 1942, with a magnitude of 0.523. A solar eclipse occurs when the Moon passes between Earth and the Sun, thereby totally or partly obscuring the image of the Sun for a viewer on Earth. A partial solar eclipse occurs in the polar regions of the Earth when the center of the Moon's shadow misses the Earth.

A partial eclipse was visible for parts of northern North America, Europe, and North Africa.

== Eclipse details ==
Shown below are two tables displaying details about this particular solar eclipse. The first table outlines times at which the Moon's penumbra or umbra attains the specific parameter, and the second table describes various other parameters pertaining to this eclipse.

September 10, 1942 Solar Eclipse Times
Event	Time (UTC)
First Penumbral External Contact	1942 September 10 at 13:57:28.2 UTC
Equatorial Conjunction	1942 September 10 at 14:55:13.2 UTC
Greatest Eclipse	1942 September 10 at 15:39:32.2 UTC
Ecliptic Conjunction	1942 September 10 at 15:53:06.5 UTC
Last Penumbral External Contact	1942 September 10 at 17:21:52.0 UTC

September 10, 1942 Solar Eclipse Parameters
Parameter	Value
Eclipse Magnitude	0.52306
Eclipse Obscuration	0.41298
Gamma	1.25711
Sun Right Ascension	11h13m14.3s
Sun Declination	+05°01'18.3"
Sun Semi-Diameter	15'53.2"
Sun Equatorial Horizontal Parallax	08.7"
Moon Right Ascension	11h14m40.0s
Moon Declination	+06°09'05.9"
Moon Semi-Diameter	15'26.6"
Moon Equatorial Horizontal Parallax	0°56'40.5"
ΔT	25.6 s

== Eclipse season ==
This eclipse is part of an eclipse season, a period, roughly every six months, when eclipses occur. Only two (or occasionally three) eclipse seasons occur each year, and each season lasts about 35 days and repeats just short of six months (173 days) later; thus two full eclipse seasons always occur each year. Either two or three eclipses happen each eclipse season. In the sequence below, each eclipse is separated by a fortnight. The first and last eclipse in this sequence is separated by one synodic month.

Eclipse season of August–September 1942
August 12 Ascending node (new moon)	August 26 Descending node (full moon)	September 10 Ascending node (new moon)
Partial solar eclipse Solar Saros 115	Total lunar eclipse Lunar Saros 127	Partial solar eclipse Solar Saros 153

== Related eclipses ==
=== Eclipses in 1942 ===
- A total lunar eclipse on March 3.
- A partial solar eclipse on March 16.
- A partial solar eclipse on August 12.
- A total lunar eclipse on August 26.
- A partial solar eclipse on September 10.

=== Metonic ===
- Preceded by: Solar eclipse of November 21, 1938
- Followed by: Solar eclipse of June 29, 1946

=== Tzolkinex ===
- Preceded by: Solar eclipse of July 30, 1935
- Followed by: Solar eclipse of October 21, 1949

=== Half-Saros ===
- Preceded by: Lunar eclipse of September 4, 1933
- Followed by: Lunar eclipse of September 15, 1951

=== Tritos ===
- Preceded by: Solar eclipse of October 11, 1931
- Followed by: Solar eclipse of August 9, 1953

=== Solar Saros 153 ===
- Preceded by: Solar eclipse of August 30, 1924
- Followed by: Solar eclipse of September 20, 1960

=== Inex ===
- Preceded by: Solar eclipse of September 30, 1913
- Followed by: Solar eclipse of August 20, 1971

=== Triad ===
- Preceded by: Solar eclipse of November 9, 1855
- Followed by: Solar eclipse of July 11, 2029

=== Solar eclipses of 1939–1942 ===
This eclipse is a member of a semester series. An eclipse in a semester series of solar eclipses repeats approximately every 177 days and 4 hours (a semester) at alternating nodes of the Moon's orbit.

The partial solar eclipse on August 12, 1942 occurs in the next lunar year eclipse set.

Solar eclipse series sets from 1939 to 1942
Descending node			Ascending node		
Saros	Map	Gamma	Saros	Map	Gamma
118	April 19, 1939 Annular	0.9388	123	October 12, 1939 Total	−0.9737
128	April 7, 1940 Annular	0.219	133	October 1, 1940 Total	−0.2573
138	March 27, 1941 Annular	−0.5025	143	September 21, 1941 Total	0.4649
148	March 16, 1942 Partial	−1.1908	153	September 10, 1942 Partial	1.2571

=== Saros 153 ===
This eclipse is a part of Saros series 153, repeating every 18 years, 11 days, and containing 70 events. The series started with a partial solar eclipse on July 28, 1870. It contains annular eclipses from December 17, 2104 through May 26, 2970. There are no hybrid or total eclipses in this set. The series ends at member 70 as a partial eclipse on August 22, 3114. Its eclipses are tabulated in three columns; every third eclipse in the same column is one exeligmos apart, so they all cast shadows over approximately the same parts of the Earth.

The longest duration of annularity will be produced by member 38 at 7 minutes, 1 seconds on September 5, 2537. All eclipses in this series occur at the Moon’s ascending node of orbit.

Series members 1–19 occur between 1870 and 2200:
1	2	3
July 28, 1870	August 7, 1888	August 20, 1906
4	5	6
August 30, 1924	September 10, 1942	September 20, 1960
7	8	9
October 2, 1978	October 12, 1996	October 23, 2014
10	11	12
November 3, 2032	November 14, 2050	November 24, 2068
13	14	15
December 6, 2086	December 17, 2104	December 28, 2122
16	17	18
January 8, 2141	January 19, 2159	January 29, 2177
19
February 10, 2195

=== Metonic series ===
The metonic series repeats eclipses every 19 years (6939.69 days), lasting about 5 cycles. Eclipses occur in nearly the same calendar date. In addition, the octon subseries repeats 1/5 of that or every 3.8 years (1387.94 days). All eclipses in this table occur at the Moon's ascending node.

23 eclipse events between February 3, 1859 and June 29, 1946
February 1–3	November 21–22	September 8–10	June 28–29	April 16–18
109	111	113	115	117
February 3, 1859	November 21, 1862		June 28, 1870	April 16, 1874
119	121	123	125	127
February 2, 1878	November 21, 1881	September 8, 1885	June 28, 1889	April 16, 1893
129	131	133	135	137
February 1, 1897	November 22, 1900	September 9, 1904	June 28, 1908	April 17, 1912
139	141	143	145	147
February 3, 1916	November 22, 1919	September 10, 1923	June 29, 1927	April 18, 1931
149	151	153	155	
February 3, 1935	November 21, 1938	September 10, 1942	June 29, 1946	

=== Tritos series ===
This eclipse is a part of a tritos cycle, repeating at alternating nodes every 135 synodic months (≈ 3986.63 days, or 11 years minus 1 month). Their appearance and longitude are irregular due to a lack of synchronization with the anomalistic month (period of perigee), but groupings of 3 tritos cycles (≈ 33 years minus 3 months) come close (≈ 434.044 anomalistic months), so eclipses are similar in these groupings.

Series members between 1801 and 1964
September 17, 1811 (Saros 141)	August 16, 1822 (Saros 142)	July 17, 1833 (Saros 143)	June 16, 1844 (Saros 144)	May 16, 1855 (Saros 145)
April 15, 1866 (Saros 146)	March 15, 1877 (Saros 147)	February 11, 1888 (Saros 148)	January 11, 1899 (Saros 149)	December 12, 1909 (Saros 150)
November 10, 1920 (Saros 151)	October 11, 1931 (Saros 152)	September 10, 1942 (Saros 153)	August 9, 1953 (Saros 154)	July 9, 1964 (Saros 155)

=== Inex series ===
This eclipse is a part of the long period inex cycle, repeating at alternating nodes, every 358 synodic months (≈ 10,571.95 days, or 29 years minus 20 days). Their appearance and longitude are irregular due to a lack of synchronization with the anomalistic month (period of perigee). However, groupings of 3 inex cycles (≈ 87 years minus 2 months) comes close (≈ 1,151.02 anomalistic months), so eclipses are similar in these groupings.

Series members between 1801 and 2200
November 29, 1826 (Saros 149)	November 9, 1855 (Saros 150)	October 19, 1884 (Saros 151)
September 30, 1913 (Saros 152)	September 10, 1942 (Saros 153)	August 20, 1971 (Saros 154)
July 31, 2000 (Saros 155)	July 11, 2029 (Saros 156)	June 21, 2058 (Saros 157)
June 1, 2087 (Saros 158)		
April 1, 2174 (Saros 161)		
