= Solar eclipse of March 5, 1924 =

20th-century partial solar eclipse

- Partial eclipse
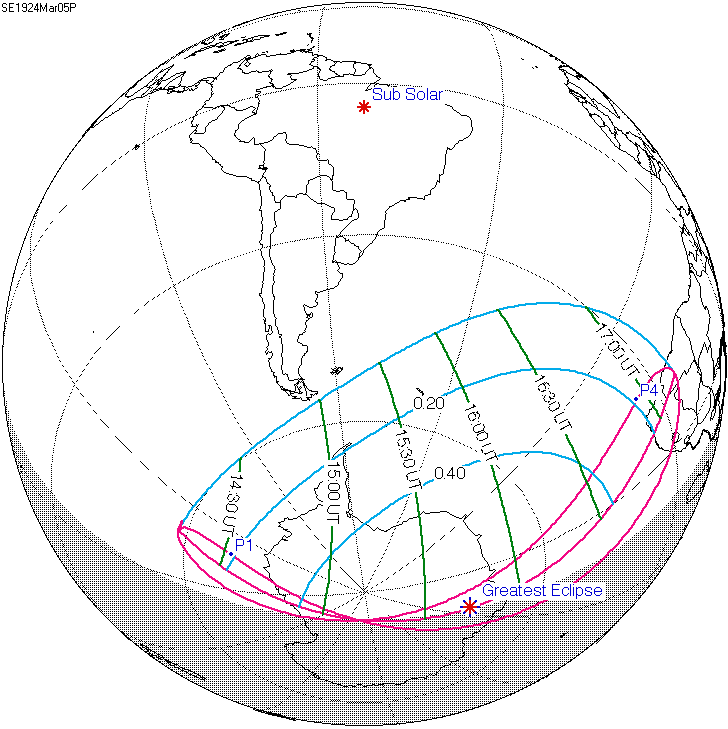
- Map
- Gamma: −1.2232
- Magnitude: 0.5819

Maximum eclipse
- Coordinates: 71.9°S 55.6°E

Times (UTC)
- Greatest eclipse: 15:44:20

References
- Saros: 148 (16 of 75)
- Catalog # (SE5000): 9336

A partial solar eclipse occurred at the Moon's descending node of orbit on Wednesday, March 5, 1924, with a magnitude of 0.5819. A solar eclipse occurs when the Moon passes between Earth and the Sun, thereby totally or partly obscuring the image of the Sun for a viewer on Earth. A partial solar eclipse occurs in the polar regions of the Earth when the center of the Moon's shadow misses the Earth.

A partial eclipse was visible for parts of Antarctica and Southern Africa.

== Eclipse details ==
Shown below are two tables displaying details about this particular solar eclipse. The first table outlines times at which the Moon's penumbra or umbra attains the specific parameter, and the second table describes various other parameters pertaining to this eclipse.

March 5, 1924 Solar Eclipse Times
Event	Time (UTC)
First Penumbral External Contact	1924 March 5 at 13:55:48.0 UTC
Equatorial Conjunction	1924 March 5 at 15:01:55.2 UTC
Greatest Eclipse	1924 March 5 at 15:44:20.0 UTC
Ecliptic Conjunction	1924 March 5 at 15:57:55.9 UTC
Last Penumbral External Contact	1924 March 5 at 17:33:17.1 UTC

March 5, 1924 Solar Eclipse Parameters
Parameter	Value
Eclipse Magnitude	0.58196
Eclipse Obscuration	0.47664
Gamma	−1.22320
Sun Right Ascension	23h04m03.9s
Sun Declination	-05°58'59.1"
Sun Semi-Diameter	16'07.1"
Sun Equatorial Horizontal Parallax	08.9"
Moon Right Ascension	23h05m25.5s
Moon Declination	-07°04'53.3"
Moon Semi-Diameter	15'24.0"
Moon Equatorial Horizontal Parallax	0°56'31.1"
ΔT	23.5 s

== Eclipse season ==
This eclipse is part of an eclipse season, a period, roughly every six months, when eclipses occur. Only two (or occasionally three) eclipse seasons occur each year, and each season lasts about 35 days and repeats just short of six months (173 days) later; thus two full eclipse seasons always occur each year. Either two or three eclipses happen each eclipse season. In the sequence below, each eclipse is separated by a fortnight.

Eclipse season of February–March 1924
February 20 Ascending node (full moon)	March 5 Descending node (new moon)
Total lunar eclipse Lunar Saros 122	Partial solar eclipse Solar Saros 148

== Related eclipses ==
=== Eclipses in 1924 ===
- A total lunar eclipse on February 20.
- A partial solar eclipse on March 5.
- A partial solar eclipse on July 31.
- A total lunar eclipse on August 14.
- A partial solar eclipse on August 30.

=== Metonic ===
- Preceded by: Solar eclipse of May 18, 1920
- Followed by: Solar eclipse of December 24, 1927

=== Tzolkinex ===
- Preceded by: Solar eclipse of January 23, 1917
- Followed by: Solar eclipse of April 18, 1931

=== Half-Saros ===
- Preceded by: Lunar eclipse of March 1, 1915
- Followed by: Lunar eclipse of March 12, 1933

=== Tritos ===
- Preceded by: Solar eclipse of April 6, 1913
- Followed by: Solar eclipse of February 3, 1935

=== Solar Saros 148 ===
- Preceded by: Solar eclipse of February 23, 1906
- Followed by: Solar eclipse of March 16, 1942

=== Inex ===
- Preceded by: Solar eclipse of March 26, 1895
- Followed by: Solar eclipse of February 14, 1953

=== Triad ===
- Preceded by: Solar eclipse of May 4, 1837
- Followed by: Solar eclipse of January 4, 2011

=== Solar eclipses of 1921–1924 ===
This eclipse is a member of a semester series. An eclipse in a semester series of solar eclipses repeats approximately every 177 days and 4 hours (a semester) at alternating nodes of the Moon's orbit.

The partial solar eclipse on July 31, 1924 occurs in the next lunar year eclipse set.

Solar eclipse series sets from 1921 to 1924
Descending node			Ascending node		
Saros	Map	Gamma	Saros	Map	Gamma
118	April 8, 1921 Annular	0.8869	123	October 1, 1921 Total	−0.9383
128	March 28, 1922 Annular	0.1711	133	September 21, 1922 Total	−0.213
138	March 17, 1923 Annular	−0.5438	143	September 10, 1923 Total	0.5149
148	March 5, 1924 Partial	−1.2232	153	August 30, 1924 Partial	1.3123

=== Saros 148 ===
This eclipse is a part of Saros series 148, repeating every 18 years, 11 days, and containing 75 events. The series started with a partial solar eclipse on September 21, 1653. It contains annular eclipses on April 29, 2014 and May 9, 2032; a hybrid eclipse on May 20, 2050; and total eclipses from May 31, 2068 through August 3, 2771. The series ends at member 75 as a partial eclipse on December 12, 2987. Its eclipses are tabulated in three columns; every third eclipse in the same column is one exeligmos apart, so they all cast shadows over approximately the same parts of the Earth.

The longest duration of annularity will be produced by member 22 at 22 seconds (by default) on May 9, 2032, and the longest duration of totality will be produced by member 54 at 5 minutes, 23 seconds on April 26, 2609. All eclipses in this series occur at the Moon’s descending node of orbit.

Series members 10–31 occur between 1801 and 2200:
10	11	12
December 30, 1815	January 9, 1834	January 21, 1852
13	14	15
January 31, 1870	February 11, 1888	February 23, 1906
16	17	18
March 5, 1924	March 16, 1942	March 27, 1960
19	20	21
April 7, 1978	April 17, 1996	April 29, 2014
22	23	24
May 9, 2032	May 20, 2050	May 31, 2068
25	26	27
June 11, 2086	June 22, 2104	July 4, 2122
28	29	30
July 14, 2140	July 25, 2158	August 4, 2176
31
August 16, 2194

=== Metonic series ===
The metonic series repeats eclipses every 19 years (6939.69 days), lasting about 5 cycles. Eclipses occur in nearly the same calendar date. In addition, the octon subseries repeats 1/5 of that or every 3.8 years (1387.94 days). All eclipses in this table occur at the Moon's descending node.

22 eclipse events between March 5, 1848 and July 30, 1935
March 5–6	December 22–24	October 9–11	July 29–30	May 17–18
108	110	112	114	116
March 5, 1848			July 29, 1859	May 17, 1863
118	120	122	124	126
March 6, 1867	December 22, 1870	October 10, 1874	July 29, 1878	May 17, 1882
128	130	132	134	136
March 5, 1886	December 22, 1889	October 9, 1893	July 29, 1897	May 18, 1901
138	140	142	144	146
March 6, 1905	December 23, 1908	October 10, 1912	July 30, 1916	May 18, 1920
148	150	152	154	
March 5, 1924	December 24, 1927	October 11, 1931	July 30, 1935	

=== Tritos series ===
This eclipse is a part of a tritos cycle, repeating at alternating nodes every 135 synodic months (≈ 3986.63 days, or 11 years minus 1 month). Their appearance and longitude are irregular due to a lack of synchronization with the anomalistic month (period of perigee), but groupings of 3 tritos cycles (≈ 33 years minus 3 months) come close (≈ 434.044 anomalistic months), so eclipses are similar in these groupings.

The partial solar eclipse on October 24, 2098 (part of Saros 164) is also a part of this series but is not included in the table below.

Series members between 1801 and 2011
February 11, 1804 (Saros 137)	January 10, 1815 (Saros 138)	December 9, 1825 (Saros 139)	November 9, 1836 (Saros 140)	October 9, 1847 (Saros 141)
September 7, 1858 (Saros 142)	August 7, 1869 (Saros 143)	July 7, 1880 (Saros 144)	June 6, 1891 (Saros 145)	May 7, 1902 (Saros 146)
April 6, 1913 (Saros 147)	March 5, 1924 (Saros 148)	February 3, 1935 (Saros 149)	January 3, 1946 (Saros 150)	December 2, 1956 (Saros 151)
November 2, 1967 (Saros 152)	October 2, 1978 (Saros 153)	August 31, 1989 (Saros 154)	July 31, 2000 (Saros 155)	July 1, 2011 (Saros 156)

=== Inex series ===
This eclipse is a part of the long period inex cycle, repeating at alternating nodes, every 358 synodic months (≈ 10,571.95 days, or 29 years minus 20 days). Their appearance and longitude are irregular due to a lack of synchronization with the anomalistic month (period of perigee). However, groupings of 3 inex cycles (≈ 87 years minus 2 months) comes close (≈ 1,151.02 anomalistic months), so eclipses are similar in these groupings.

Series members between 1801 and 2200
May 25, 1808 (Saros 144)	May 4, 1837 (Saros 145)	April 15, 1866 (Saros 146)
March 26, 1895 (Saros 147)	March 5, 1924 (Saros 148)	February 14, 1953 (Saros 149)
January 24, 1982 (Saros 150)	January 4, 2011 (Saros 151)	December 15, 2039 (Saros 152)
November 24, 2068 (Saros 153)	November 4, 2097 (Saros 154)	October 16, 2126 (Saros 155)
September 26, 2155 (Saros 156)	September 4, 2184 (Saros 157)	
