= Solar eclipse of December 24, 1927 =

20th-century partial solar eclipse

- Partial eclipse
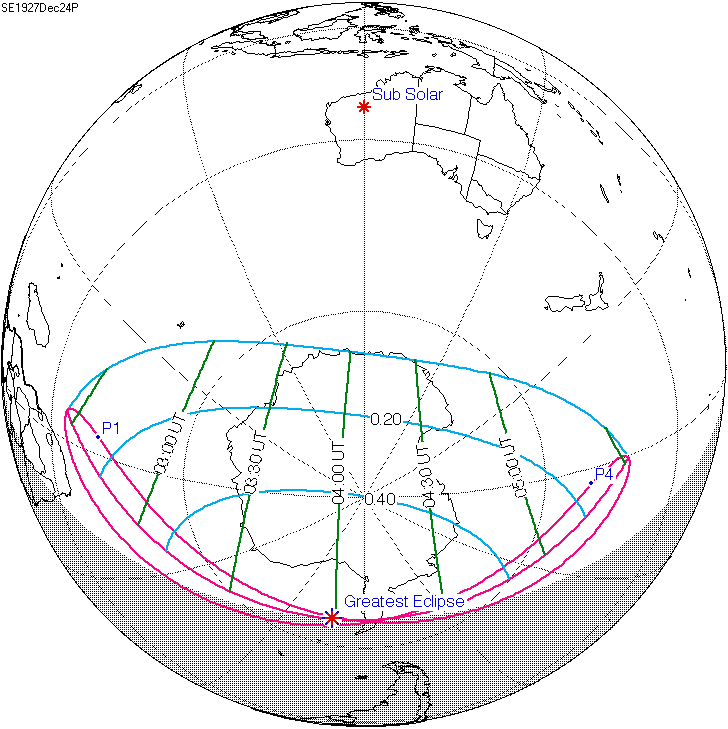
- Map
- Gamma: −1.2416
- Magnitude: 0.549

Maximum eclipse
- Coordinates: 66.1°S 47.7°W

Times (UTC)
- Greatest eclipse: 3:59:41

References
- Saros: 150 (12 of 71)
- Catalog # (SE5000): 9345

A partial solar eclipse occurred at the Moon's descending node of orbit on Saturday, December 24, 1927, with a magnitude of 0.549. A solar eclipse occurs when the Moon passes between Earth and the Sun, thereby totally or partly obscuring the image of the Sun for a viewer on Earth. A partial solar eclipse occurs in the polar regions of the Earth when the center of the Moon's shadow misses the Earth.

A partial eclipse was visible for most of Antarctica.

== Eclipse details ==
Shown below are two tables displaying details about this particular solar eclipse. The first table outlines times at which the Moon's penumbra or umbra attains the specific parameter, and the second table describes various other parameters pertaining to this eclipse.

December 24, 1927 Solar Eclipse Times
| Event | Time (UTC) |
|---|---|
| First Penumbral External Contact | 1927 December 24 at 02:10:08.1 UTC |
| Greatest Eclipse | 1927 December 24 at 03:59:41.1 UTC |
| Equatorial Conjunction | 1927 December 24 at 04:12:05.4 UTC |
| Ecliptic Conjunction | 1927 December 24 at 04:13:34.1 UTC |
| Last Penumbral External Contact | 1927 December 24 at 05:49:03.8 UTC |

December 24, 1927 Solar Eclipse Parameters
| Parameter | Value |
|---|---|
| Eclipse Magnitude | 0.54900 |
| Eclipse Obscuration | 0.43598 |
| Gamma | −1.24161 |
| Sun Right Ascension | 18h05m51.9s |
| Sun Declination | -23°26'31.6" |
| Sun Semi-Diameter | 16'15.7" |
| Sun Equatorial Horizontal Parallax | 08.9" |
| Moon Right Ascension | 18h05m25.7s |
| Moon Declination | -24°35'11.1" |
| Moon Semi-Diameter | 15'09.9" |
| Moon Equatorial Horizontal Parallax | 0°55'39.4" |
| ΔT | 24.3 s |

== Eclipse season ==
This eclipse is part of an eclipse season, a period, roughly every six months, when eclipses occur. Only two (or occasionally three) eclipse seasons occur each year, and each season lasts about 35 days and repeats just short of six months (173 days) later; thus two full eclipse seasons always occur each year. Either two or three eclipses happen each eclipse season. In the sequence below, each eclipse is separated by a fortnight.

Eclipse season of December 1927
| December 8 Ascending node (full moon) | December 24 Descending node (new moon) |
|---|---|
| Total lunar eclipse Lunar Saros 124 | Partial solar eclipse Solar Saros 150 |

== Related eclipses ==
=== Eclipses in 1927 ===
- An annular solar eclipse on January 3.
- A total lunar eclipse on June 15.
- A total solar eclipse on June 29.
- A total lunar eclipse on December 8.
- A partial solar eclipse on December 24.

=== Metonic ===
- Preceded by: Solar eclipse of March 5, 1924
- Followed by: Solar eclipse of October 11, 1931

=== Tzolkinex ===
- Preceded by: Solar eclipse of November 10, 1920
- Followed by: Solar eclipse of February 3, 1935

=== Half-Saros ===
- Preceded by: Lunar eclipse of December 17, 1918
- Followed by: Lunar eclipse of December 28, 1936

=== Tritos ===
- Preceded by: Solar eclipse of January 23, 1917
- Followed by: Solar eclipse of November 21, 1938

=== Solar Saros 150 ===
- Preceded by: Solar eclipse of December 12, 1909
- Followed by: Solar eclipse of January 3, 1946

=== Inex ===
- Preceded by: Solar eclipse of January 11, 1899
- Followed by: Solar eclipse of December 2, 1956

=== Triad ===
- Preceded by: Solar eclipse of February 21, 1841
- Followed by: Solar eclipse of October 23, 2014

=== Solar eclipses of 1924–1928 ===
This eclipse is a member of a semester series. An eclipse in a semester series of solar eclipses repeats approximately every 177 days and 4 hours (a semester) at alternating nodes of the Moon's orbit.

The partial solar eclipses on March 5, 1924 and August 30, 1924 occur in the previous lunar year eclipse set, and the solar eclipses on May 19, 1928 and November 12, 1928 occur in the next lunar year eclipse set.

Solar eclipse series sets from 1924 to 1928
| Ascending node | | | Descending node | | |
| Saros | Map | Gamma | Saros | Map | Gamma |
| 115 | July 31, 1924 Partial | −1.4459 | 120 | January 24, 1925 Total | 0.8661 |
| 125 | July 20, 1925 Annular | −0.7193 | 130 Totality in Sumatra, Indonesia | January 14, 1926 Total | 0.1973 |
| 135 | July 9, 1926 Annular | 0.0538 | 140 | January 3, 1927 Annular | −0.4956 |
| 145 | June 29, 1927 Total | 0.8163 | 150 | December 24, 1927 Partial | −1.2416 |
| 155 | June 17, 1928 Partial | 1.5107 | | | |

=== Saros 150 ===
This eclipse is a part of Saros series 150, repeating every 18 years, 11 days, and containing 71 events. The series started with a partial solar eclipse on August 24, 1729. It contains annular eclipses from April 22, 2126 through June 22, 2829. There are no hybrid or total eclipses in this set. The series ends at member 71 as a partial eclipse on September 29, 2991. Its eclipses are tabulated in three columns; every third eclipse in the same column is one exeligmos apart, so they all cast shadows over approximately the same parts of the Earth.

The longest duration of annularity will be produced by member 45 at 9 minutes, 58 seconds on December 19, 2522. All eclipses in this series occur at the Moon’s descending node of orbit.

Series members 5–27 occur between 1801 and 2200:
| 5 | 6 | 7 |
|---|---|---|
| October 7, 1801 | October 19, 1819 | October 29, 1837 |
| 8 | 9 | 10 |
| November 9, 1855 | November 20, 1873 | December 1, 1891 |
| 11 | 12 | 13 |
| December 12, 1909 | December 24, 1927 | January 3, 1946 |
| 14 | 15 | 16 |
| January 14, 1964 | January 25, 1982 | February 5, 2000 |
| 17 | 18 | 19 |
| February 15, 2018 | February 27, 2036 | March 9, 2054 |
| 20 | 21 | 22 |
| March 19, 2072 | March 31, 2090 | April 11, 2108 |
| 23 | 24 | 25 |
| April 22, 2126 | May 3, 2144 | May 14, 2162 |
| 26 | 27 | |
| May 24, 2180 | June 4, 2198 | |

=== Metonic series ===
The metonic series repeats eclipses every 19 years (6939.69 days), lasting about 5 cycles. Eclipses occur in nearly the same calendar date. In addition, the octon subseries repeats 1/5 of that or every 3.8 years (1387.94 days). All eclipses in this table occur at the Moon's descending node.

22 eclipse events between March 5, 1848 and July 30, 1935
| March 5–6 | December 22–24 | October 9–11 | July 29–30 | May 17–18 |
| 108 | 110 | 112 | 114 | 116 |
|---|---|---|---|---|
| March 5, 1848 | | | July 29, 1859 | May 17, 1863 |
| 118 | 120 | 122 | 124 | 126 |
| March 6, 1867 | December 22, 1870 | October 10, 1874 | July 29, 1878 | May 17, 1882 |
| 128 | 130 | 132 | 134 | 136 |
| March 5, 1886 | December 22, 1889 | October 9, 1893 | July 29, 1897 | May 18, 1901 |
| 138 | 140 | 142 | 144 | 146 |
| March 6, 1905 | December 23, 1908 | October 10, 1912 | July 30, 1916 | May 18, 1920 |
| 148 | 150 | 152 | 154 | |
| March 5, 1924 | December 24, 1927 | October 11, 1931 | July 30, 1935 | |

=== Tritos series ===
This eclipse is a part of a tritos cycle, repeating at alternating nodes every 135 synodic months (≈ 3986.63 days, or 11 years minus 1 month). Their appearance and longitude are irregular due to a lack of synchronization with the anomalistic month (period of perigee), but groupings of 3 tritos cycles (≈ 33 years minus 3 months) come close (≈ 434.044 anomalistic months), so eclipses are similar in these groupings.

Series members between 1801 and 1982
| November 29, 1807 (Saros 139) | October 29, 1818 (Saros 140) | September 28, 1829 (Saros 141) | August 27, 1840 (Saros 142) | July 28, 1851 (Saros 143) |
| June 27, 1862 (Saros 144) | May 26, 1873 (Saros 145) | April 25, 1884 (Saros 146) | March 26, 1895 (Saros 147) | February 23, 1906 (Saros 148) |
| January 23, 1917 (Saros 149) | December 24, 1927 (Saros 150) | November 21, 1938 (Saros 151) | October 21, 1949 (Saros 152) | September 20, 1960 (Saros 153) |
| August 20, 1971 (Saros 154) | July 20, 1982 (Saros 155) | | | |

=== Inex series ===
This eclipse is a part of the long period inex cycle, repeating at alternating nodes, every 358 synodic months (≈ 10,571.95 days, or 29 years minus 20 days). Their appearance and longitude are irregular due to a lack of synchronization with the anomalistic month (period of perigee). However, groupings of 3 inex cycles (≈ 87 years minus 2 months) comes close (≈ 1,151.02 anomalistic months), so eclipses are similar in these groupings.

Series members between 1801 and 2200
| March 13, 1812 (Saros 146) | February 21, 1841 (Saros 147) | January 31, 1870 (Saros 148) |
| January 11, 1899 (Saros 149) | December 24, 1927 (Saros 150) | December 2, 1956 (Saros 151) |
| November 12, 1985 (Saros 152) | October 23, 2014 (Saros 153) | October 3, 2043 (Saros 154) |
| September 12, 2072 (Saros 155) | August 24, 2101 (Saros 156) | August 4, 2130 (Saros 157) |
| July 15, 2159 (Saros 158) | June 24, 2188 (Saros 159) | |
