= Solar eclipse of January 23, 1917 =

20th-century partial solar eclipse

- Partial eclipse
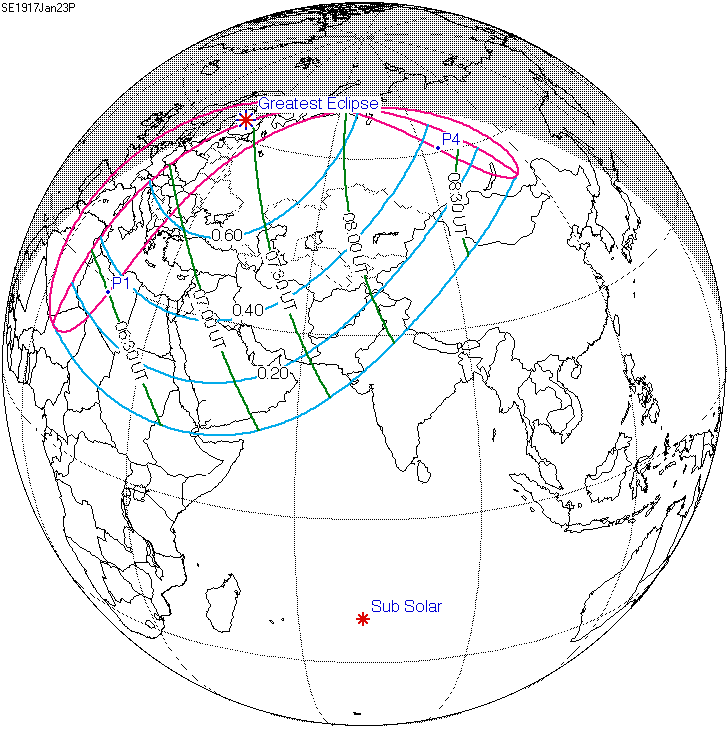
- Map
- Gamma: 1.1508
- Magnitude: 0.7254

Maximum eclipse
- Coordinates: 63.2°N 25.6°E

Times (UTC)
- Greatest eclipse: 7:28:31

References
- Saros: 149 (15 of 71)
- Catalog # (SE5000): 9319

A partial solar eclipse occurred at the Moon's ascending node of orbit on Tuesday, January 23, 1917, with a magnitude of 0.7254. A solar eclipse occurs when the Moon passes between Earth and the Sun, thereby totally or partly obscuring the image of the Sun for a viewer on Earth. A partial solar eclipse occurs in the polar regions of the Earth when the center of the Moon's shadow misses the Earth.

This was the first of four solar eclipses in 1917, with the others occurring on June 19, July 19, and December 14.

A partial eclipse was visible for parts of Northeast Africa, Europe, West Asia, and Central Asia.

The date of this eclipse was also Lunar New Year, celebrated in many places in Asia, where this eclipse was visible.

== Eclipse details ==
Shown below are two tables displaying details about this particular solar eclipse. The first table outlines times at which the Moon's penumbra or umbra attains the specific parameter, and the second table describes various other parameters pertaining to this eclipse.

January 23, 1917 Solar Eclipse Times
Event	Time (UTC)
First Penumbral External Contact	1917 January 23 at 05:43:32.4 UTC
Greatest Eclipse	1917 January 23 at 07:28:31.3 UTC
Ecliptic Conjunction	1917 January 23 at 07:39:57.6 UTC
Equatorial Conjunction	1917 January 23 at 08:08:41.5 UTC
Last Penumbral External Contact	1917 January 23 at 09:13:12.8 UTC

January 23, 1917 Solar Eclipse Parameters
Parameter	Value
Eclipse Magnitude	0.72542
Eclipse Obscuration	0.66080
Gamma	1.15085
Sun Right Ascension	20h20m08.5s
Sun Declination	-19°33'15.8"
Sun Semi-Diameter	16'14.8"
Sun Equatorial Horizontal Parallax	08.9"
Moon Right Ascension	20h18m33.1s
Moon Declination	-18°26'25.6"
Moon Semi-Diameter	16'44.5"
Moon Equatorial Horizontal Parallax	1°01'26.6"
ΔT	19.1 s

== Eclipse season ==
This eclipse is part of an eclipse season, a period, roughly every six months, when eclipses occur. Only two (or occasionally three) eclipse seasons occur each year, and each season lasts about 35 days and repeats just short of six months (173 days) later; thus two full eclipse seasons always occur each year. Either two or three eclipses happen each eclipse season. In the sequence below, each eclipse is separated by a fortnight. The first and last eclipse in this sequence is separated by one synodic month.

Eclipse season of December 1916–January 1917
December 24 Ascending node (new moon)	January 8 Descending node (full moon)	January 23 Ascending node (new moon)
Partial solar eclipse Solar Saros 111	Total lunar eclipse Lunar Saros 123	Partial solar eclipse Solar Saros 149

== Related eclipses ==
=== Eclipses in 1917 ===
- A total lunar eclipse on January 8.
- A partial solar eclipse on January 23.
- A partial solar eclipse on June 19.
- A total lunar eclipse on July 4.
- A partial solar eclipse on July 19.
- An annular solar eclipse on December 14.
- A total lunar eclipse on December 28.

=== Metonic ===
- Preceded by: Solar eclipse of April 6, 1913
- Followed by: Solar eclipse of November 10, 1920

=== Tzolkinex ===
- Preceded by: Solar eclipse of December 12, 1909
- Followed by: Solar eclipse of March 5, 1924

=== Half-Saros ===
- Preceded by: Lunar eclipse of January 18, 1908
- Followed by: Lunar eclipse of January 28, 1926

=== Tritos ===
- Preceded by: Solar eclipse of February 23, 1906
- Followed by: Solar eclipse of December 24, 1927

=== Solar Saros 149 ===
- Preceded by: Solar eclipse of January 11, 1899
- Followed by: Solar eclipse of February 3, 1935

=== Inex ===
- Preceded by: Solar eclipse of February 11, 1888
- Followed by: Solar eclipse of January 3, 1946

=== Triad ===
- Preceded by: Solar eclipse of March 24, 1830
- Followed by: Solar eclipse of November 23, 2003

=== Solar eclipses of 1913–1917 ===
This eclipse is a member of a semester series. An eclipse in a semester series of solar eclipses repeats approximately every 177 days and 4 hours (a semester) at alternating nodes of the Moon's orbit.

The partial solar eclipses on April 6, 1913 and September 30, 1913 occur in the previous lunar year eclipse set, and the solar eclipses on December 24, 1916 (partial), June 19, 1917 (partial), and December 14, 1917 (annular) occur in the next lunar year eclipse set.

Solar eclipse series sets from 1913 to 1917
Descending node			Ascending node		
Saros	Map	Gamma	Saros	Map	Gamma
114	August 31, 1913 Partial	1.4512	119	February 25, 1914 Annular	−0.9416
124	August 21, 1914 Total	0.7655	129	February 14, 1915 Annular	−0.2024
134	August 10, 1915 Annular	0.0124	139	February 3, 1916 Total	0.4987
144	July 30, 1916 Annular	−0.7709	149	January 23, 1917 Partial	1.1508
154	July 19, 1917 Partial	−1.5101			

=== Saros 149 ===
This eclipse is a part of Saros series 149, repeating every 18 years, 11 days, 8 hours and containing 71 events. The series started with a partial solar eclipse on August 21, 1664. It contains total eclipses from April 9, 2043 through October 2, 2331; hybrid eclipses from October 13, 2349 through November 3, 2385; and annular eclipses from November 15, 2403 through July 13, 2800. The series ends at member 71 as a partial eclipse on September 28, 2926. Its eclipses are tabulated in three columns; every third eclipse in the same column is one exeligmos apart, so they all cast shadows over approximately the same parts of the Earth.

The longest duration of totality will be produced by member 31 at 4 minutes, 10 seconds on July 17, 2205, and the longest duration of annularity will be produced by member 62 at 5 minutes, 6 seconds on June 21, 2764. All eclipses in this series occur at the Moon’s ascending node of orbit.

Series members 9–30 occur between 1801 and 2200:
9	10	11
November 18, 1808	November 29, 1826	December 9, 1844
12	13	14
December 21, 1862	December 31, 1880	January 11, 1899
15	16	17
January 23, 1917	February 3, 1935	February 14, 1953
18	19	20
February 25, 1971	March 7, 1989	March 19, 2007
21	22	23
March 29, 2025	April 9, 2043	April 20, 2061
24	25	26
May 1, 2079	May 11, 2097	May 24, 2115
27	28	29
June 3, 2133	June 14, 2151	June 25, 2169
30
July 6, 2187

=== Metonic series ===
The metonic series repeats eclipses every 19 years (6939.69 days), lasting about 5 cycles. Eclipses occur in nearly the same calendar date. In addition, the octon subseries repeats 1/5 of that or every 3.8 years (1387.94 days). All eclipses in this table occur at the Moon's ascending node.

25 eclipse events between April 5, 1837 and June 17, 1928
April 5–6	January 22–23	November 10–11	August 28–30	June 17–18
107	109	111	113	115
April 5, 1837	January 22, 1841	November 10, 1844	August 28, 1848	June 17, 1852
117	119	121	123	125
April 5, 1856	January 23, 1860	November 11, 1863	August 29, 1867	June 18, 1871
127	129	131	133	135
April 6, 1875	January 22, 1879	November 10, 1882	August 29, 1886	June 17, 1890
137	139	141	143	145
April 6, 1894	January 22, 1898	November 11, 1901	August 30, 1905	June 17, 1909
147	149	151	153	155
April 6, 1913	January 23, 1917	November 10, 1920	August 30, 1924	June 17, 1928

=== Tritos series ===
This eclipse is a part of a tritos cycle, repeating at alternating nodes every 135 synodic months (≈ 3986.63 days, or 11 years minus 1 month). Their appearance and longitude are irregular due to a lack of synchronization with the anomalistic month (period of perigee), but groupings of 3 tritos cycles (≈ 33 years minus 3 months) come close (≈ 434.044 anomalistic months), so eclipses are similar in these groupings.

Series members between 1801 and 1982
November 29, 1807 (Saros 139)	October 29, 1818 (Saros 140)	September 28, 1829 (Saros 141)	August 27, 1840 (Saros 142)	July 28, 1851 (Saros 143)
June 27, 1862 (Saros 144)	May 26, 1873 (Saros 145)	April 25, 1884 (Saros 146)	March 26, 1895 (Saros 147)	February 23, 1906 (Saros 148)
January 23, 1917 (Saros 149)	December 24, 1927 (Saros 150)	November 21, 1938 (Saros 151)	October 21, 1949 (Saros 152)	September 20, 1960 (Saros 153)
August 20, 1971 (Saros 154)	July 20, 1982 (Saros 155)			

=== Inex series ===
This eclipse is a part of the long period inex cycle, repeating at alternating nodes, every 358 synodic months (≈ 10,571.95 days, or 29 years minus 20 days). Their appearance and longitude are irregular due to a lack of synchronization with the anomalistic month (period of perigee). However, groupings of 3 inex cycles (≈ 87 years minus 2 months) comes close (≈ 1,151.02 anomalistic months), so eclipses are similar in these groupings.

Series members between 1801 and 2200
April 13, 1801 (Saros 145)	March 24, 1830 (Saros 146)	March 4, 1859 (Saros 147)
February 11, 1888 (Saros 148)	January 23, 1917 (Saros 149)	January 3, 1946 (Saros 150)
December 13, 1974 (Saros 151)	November 23, 2003 (Saros 152)	November 3, 2032 (Saros 153)
October 13, 2061 (Saros 154)	September 23, 2090 (Saros 155)	September 5, 2119 (Saros 156)
August 14, 2148 (Saros 157)	July 25, 2177 (Saros 158)	
