= Solar Saros 150 =

Saros cycle series 150 for solar eclipses

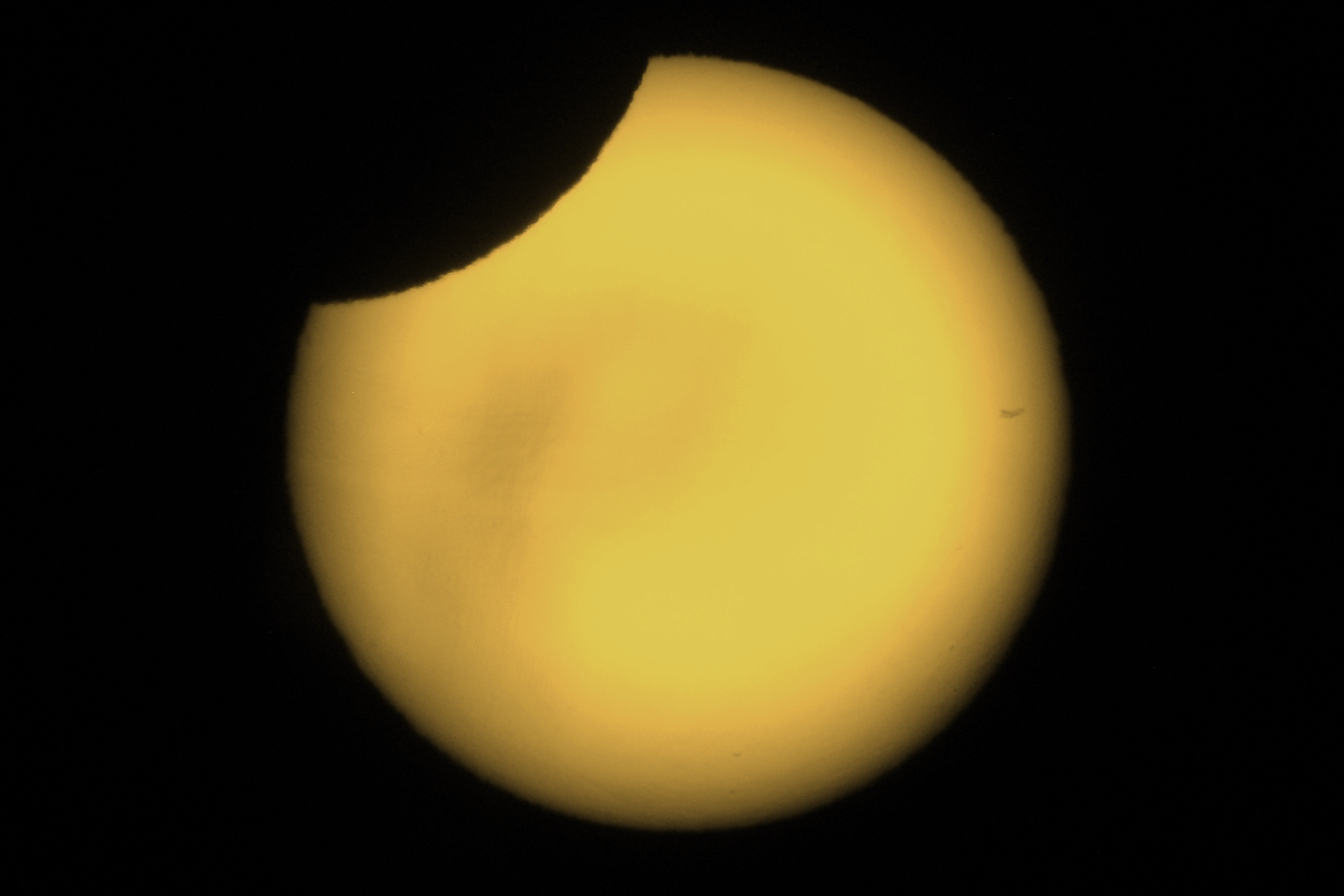
February 15, 2018 event From Olivos, Buenos Aires, Argentina Partiality from partial event Series member 17

Animation of the series

Saros cycle series 150 for solar eclipses occurs at the Moon's descending node, repeating every 18 years, 11 days, containing 71 eclipses, 40 of which are umbral (all annular). The first eclipse in the series was on 24 August 1729 and the last will be on 29 September 2991. The most recent eclipse was a partial eclipse on 15 February 2018 and the next will be a partial eclipse on 27 February 2036. The longest duration of annularity will be 9 minutes, 58 seconds on December 19, 2522.

This solar saros is linked to Lunar Saros 143.

Series members 11-21 occurring between 1901 and 2100:
11	12	13
December 12, 1909	December 24, 1927	January 3, 1946
14	15	16
January 14, 1964	January 25, 1982	February 5, 2000
17	18	19
February 15, 2018	February 27, 2036	March 9, 2054
20	21	
March 19, 2072	March 31, 2090	

== Umbral eclipses ==
Umbral eclipses (annular, total and hybrid) can be further classified as either: 1) Central (two limits), 2) Central (one limit) or 3) Non-Central (one limit). The statistical distribution of these classes in Saros series 150 appears in the following table.

Classification	Number	Percent
All Umbral eclipses	40	100.00%
Central (two limits)	39	97.50%
Central (one limit)	0	0.00%
Non-central (one limit)	1	2.50%

== All eclipses ==
Saros	Member	Date	Time (Greatest) UTC	Type	Location Lat, Long	Gamma	Mag.	Width (km)	Duration (min:sec)	Ref
150	1	August 24, 1729	13:48:31	Partial	61.7S 95.2W	-1.543	0.0067			
150	2	September 4, 1747	21:07:57	Partial	61.4S 146.1E	-1.488	0.1086			
150	3	September 15, 1765	4:32:34	Partial	61.1S 26.2E	-1.4378	0.2009			
150	4	September 26, 1783	12:04:17	Partial	61.1S 95.4W	-1.3935	0.2814			
150	5	October 7, 1801	19:42:34	Partial	61.2S 141.3E	-1.3552	0.3505			
150	6	October 19, 1819	3:27:17	Partial	61.5S 16.4E	-1.3226	0.4085			
150	7	October 29, 1837	11:19:24	Partial	61.9S 110.5W	-1.2967	0.4542			
150	8	November 9, 1855	19:17:51	Partial	62.5S 121E	-1.2767	0.4892			
150	9	November 20, 1873	3:22:52	Partial	63.2S 9.5W	-1.2625	0.5138			
150	10	December 1, 1891	11:31:08	Partial	64.1S 140.9W	-1.2515	0.5326			
150	11	December 12, 1909	19:44:48	Partial	65S 86E	-1.2456	0.5424			
150	12	December 24, 1927	3:59:41	Partial	66.1S 47.7W	-1.2416	0.549			
150	13	January 3, 1946	12:16:11	Partial	67.1S 177.6E	-1.2392	0.5529			
150	14	January 14, 1964	20:30:08	Partial	68.2S 43.1E	-1.2354	0.5591			
150	15	January 25, 1982	4:42:53	Partial	69.3S 91.7W	-1.2311	0.5663			
150	16	February 5, 2000	12:50:27	Partial	70.2S 134.1E	-1.2233	0.5795			
150	17	February 15, 2018	20:52:33	Partial	71S 0.6E	-1.2116	0.5991			
150	18	February 27, 2036	4:46:49	Partial	71.6S 131.4W	-1.1942	0.6286			
150	19	March 9, 2054	12:33:40	Partial	72S 97.9E	-1.1711	0.6678			
150	20	March 19, 2072	20:10:31	Partial	72.2S 30.4W	-1.1405	0.7199			
150	21	March 31, 2090	3:38:08	Partial	72.1S 156.3W	-1.1028	0.7843			
150	22	April 11, 2108	10:55:37	Partial	71.7S 80.5E	-1.0573	0.862			
150	23	April 22, 2126	18:04:22	Annular (Note: Non-central)	71.1S 40W	1.0051	0.9514	-	-	
150	24	May 3, 2144	1:02:06	Annular	53.6S 175.9W	-0.9441	0.9363	727	6m 9s	
150	25	May 14, 2162	7:52:46	Annular	42.3S 72.8E	-0.8775	0.9396	468	6m 37s	
150	26	May 24, 2180	14:34:28	Annular	32.6S 32.9W	-0.8035	0.9422	359	6m 59s	
150	27	June 4, 2198	21:11:35	Annular	24.2S 135.7W	-0.726	0.9442	299	7m 13s	
150	28	June 16, 2216	3:41:04	Annular	16.7S 124.6E	-0.642	0.9458	260	7m 20s	
150	29	June 27, 2234	10:09:34	Annular	10.3S 26.1E	-0.5572	0.9468	235	7m 18s	
150	30	July 7, 2252	16:34:12	Annular	4.9S 70.6W	-0.4686	0.9473	218	7m 10s	
150	31	July 18, 2270	22:59:54	Annular	0.7S 166.9W	-0.3811	0.9474	208	6m 57s	
150	32	July 29, 2288	5:25:23	Annular	2.5N 97.4E	-0.293	0.9469	203	6m 46s	
150	33	August 10, 2306	11:55:10	Annular	4.6N 1E	-0.2083	0.9461	202	6m 37s	
150	34	August 20, 2324	18:28:22	Annular	5.7N 96W	-0.1261	0.9449	205	6m 33s	
150	35	September 1, 2342	1:06:55	Annular	6.1N 165.7E	-0.048	0.9434	209	6m 34s	
150	36	September 11, 2360	7:52:25	Annular	5.7N 65.6E	0.0244	0.9415	217	6m 41s	
150	37	September 22, 2378	14:45:48	Annular	4.8N 36.6W	0.0904	0.9396	225	6m 54s	
150	38	October 2, 2396	21:48:07	Annular	3.5N 141.2W	0.1493	0.9375	234	7m 12s	
150	39	October 14, 2414	4:58:50	Annular	2.2N 111.8E	0.2015	0.9355	245	7m 34s	
150	40	October 24, 2432	12:19:58	Annular	0.8N 2.1E	0.2455	0.9335	255	8m 1s	
150	41	November 4, 2450	19:49:31	Annular	0.5S 109.9W	0.2828	0.9318	264	8m 30s	
150	42	November 15, 2468	3:28:23	Annular	1.5S 135.7E	0.3126	0.9304	273	8m 59s	
150	43	November 26, 2486	11:15:08	Annular	2.1S 19.2E	0.3363	0.9294	280	9m 26s	
150	44	December 7, 2504	19:10:09	Annular	2.3S 99.5W	0.3535	0.9289	284	9m 46s	
150	45	December 19, 2522	3:10:40	Annular	2S 140.4E	0.3668	0.9289	286	9m 58s	
150	46	December 29, 2540	11:15:59	Annular	1S 19E	0.3765	0.9295	285	9m 57s	
150	47	January 9, 2559	19:24:29	Annular	0.6N 103.4W	0.3841	0.9308	280	9m 43s	
150	48	January 20, 2577	3:35:00	Annular	2.8N 133.7E	0.3901	0.9326	273	9m 18s	
150	49	January 31, 2595	11:44:03	Annular	5.9N 10.9E	0.3981	0.9352	263	8m 42s	
150	50	February 11, 2613	19:51:44	Annular	9.6N 111.8W	0.4076	0.9382	250	8m 0s	
150	51	February 23, 2631	3:55:11	Annular	14N 126.3E	0.4211	0.9419	236	7m 13s	
150	52	March 5, 2649	11:55:21	Annular	19N 5.2E	0.4378	0.946	220	6m 25s	
150	53	March 16, 2667	19:47:40	Annular	24.6N 114.3W	0.4613	0.9506	203	5m 36s	
150	54	March 27, 2685	3:35:09	Annular	30.7N 127.5E	0.4895	0.9554	185	4m 48s	
150	55	April 8, 2703	11:13:59	Annular	37.2N 11.4E	0.5256	0.9605	167	4m 1s	
150	56	April 18, 2721	18:47:26	Annular	44.1N 103.1W	0.5665	0.9657	150	3m 17s	
150	57	April 30, 2739	2:11:56	Annular	51.4N 145E	0.6157	0.9708	133	2m 37s	
150	58	May 10, 2757	9:32:11	Annular	58.9N 35.1E	0.669	0.9758	116	2m 1s	
150	59	May 21, 2775	16:45:20	Annular	66.7N 71.6W	0.7292	0.9804	102	1m 31s	
150	60	May 31, 2793	23:54:30	Annular	74.7N 173.3W	0.7933	0.9846	90	1m 6s	
150	61	June 12, 2811	6:58:46	Annular	82.8N 102.4E	0.8623	0.988	84	0m 47s	
150	62	June 22, 2829	14:01:25	Annular	83.4N 97.9E	0.9335	0.9904	97	0m 35s	
150	63	July 3, 2847	21:02:28	Partial	64.9N 33.4E	1.0066	0.9775			
150	64	July 14, 2865	4:03:03	Partial	64N 80.8W	1.0808	0.8446			
150	65	July 25, 2883	11:05:22	Partial	63.3N 164.7E	1.1544	0.7116			
150	66	August 5, 2901	18:10:19	Partial	62.6N 49.9E	1.2266	0.5801			
150	67	August 17, 2919	1:18:50	Partial	62.1N 65.7W	1.2963	0.4526			
150	68	August 27, 2937	8:32:10	Partial	61.7N 177.6E	1.3627	0.3306			
150	69	September 7, 2955	15:51:40	Partial	61.4N 59.5E	1.4246	0.2164			
150	70	September 17, 2973	23:18:46	Partial	61.3N 60.5W	1.4812	0.1119			
150	71	September 29, 2991	6:52:19	Partial	61.4N 178E	1.5333	0.0156			
