= Solar eclipse of November 21, 1938 =

20th-century partial solar eclipse

- Partial eclipse
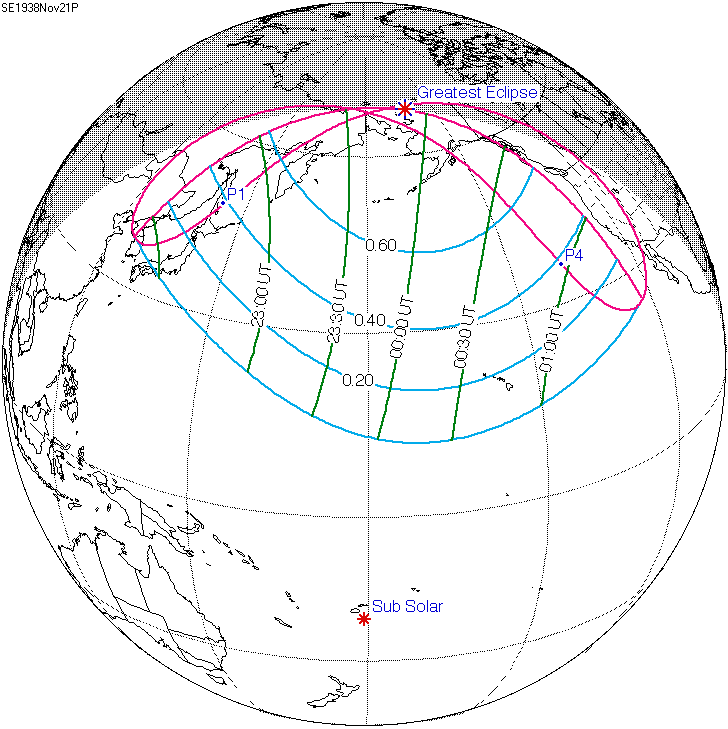
- Map
- Gamma: 1.1077
- Magnitude: 0.7781

Maximum eclipse
- Coordinates: 68.9°N 162°W

Times (UTC)
- Greatest eclipse: 23:52:25

References
- Saros: 151 (10 of 72)
- Catalog # (SE5000): 9372

A partial solar eclipse occurred at the Moon's ascending node of orbit between Monday, November 21 and Tuesday, November 22, 1938, with a magnitude of 0.7781. A solar eclipse occurs when the Moon passes between Earth and the Sun, thereby totally or partly obscuring the image of the Sun for a viewer on Earth. A partial solar eclipse occurs in the polar regions of the Earth when the center of the Moon's shadow misses the Earth.

A partial eclipse was visible for parts of Northeast Asia, Hawaii, and western North America.

== Eclipse details ==
Shown below are two tables displaying details about this particular solar eclipse. The first table outlines times at which the Moon's penumbra or umbra attains the specific parameter, and the second table describes various other parameters pertaining to this eclipse.

November 21, 1938 Solar Eclipse Times
Event	Time (UTC)
First Penumbral External Contact	1938 November 21 at 21:45:25.1 UTC
Equatorial Conjunction	1938 November 21 at 23:36:56.9 UTC
Greatest Eclipse	1938 November 21 at 23:52:25.0 UTC
Ecliptic Conjunction	1938 November 22 at 00:05:04.6 UTC
Last Penumbral External Contact	1938 November 22 at 01:59:37.3 UTC

November 21, 1938 Solar Eclipse Parameters
Parameter	Value
Eclipse Magnitude	0.77807
Eclipse Obscuration	0.70163
Gamma	1.10769
Sun Right Ascension	15h47m12.0s
Sun Declination	-19°56'42.7"
Sun Semi-Diameter	16'11.6"
Sun Equatorial Horizontal Parallax	08.9"
Moon Right Ascension	15h47m43.3s
Moon Declination	-18°55'45.4"
Moon Semi-Diameter	15'08.6"
Moon Equatorial Horizontal Parallax	0°55'34.7"
ΔT	24.0 s

== Eclipse season ==
This eclipse is part of an eclipse season, a period, roughly every six months, when eclipses occur. Only two (or occasionally three) eclipse seasons occur each year, and each season lasts about 35 days and repeats just short of six months (173 days) later; thus two full eclipse seasons always occur each year. Either two or three eclipses happen each eclipse season. In the sequence below, each eclipse is separated by a fortnight.

Eclipse season of November 1938
November 7 Descending node (full moon)	November 21 Ascending node (new moon)
Total lunar eclipse Lunar Saros 125	Partial solar eclipse Solar Saros 151

== Related eclipses ==
=== Eclipses in 1938 ===
- A total lunar eclipse on May 14.
- A total solar eclipse on May 29.
- A total lunar eclipse on November 7.
- A partial solar eclipse on November 21.

=== Metonic ===
- Preceded by: Solar eclipse of February 3, 1935
- Followed by: Solar eclipse of September 10, 1942

=== Tzolkinex ===
- Preceded by: Solar eclipse of October 11, 1931
- Followed by: Solar eclipse of January 3, 1946

=== Half-Saros ===
- Preceded by: Lunar eclipse of November 17, 1929
- Followed by: Lunar eclipse of November 28, 1947

=== Tritos ===
- Preceded by: Solar eclipse of December 24, 1927
- Followed by: Solar eclipse of October 21, 1949

=== Solar Saros 151 ===
- Preceded by: Solar eclipse of November 10, 1920
- Followed by: Solar eclipse of December 2, 1956

=== Inex ===
- Preceded by: Solar eclipse of December 12, 1909
- Followed by: Solar eclipse of November 2, 1967

=== Triad ===
- Preceded by: Solar eclipse of January 21, 1852
- Followed by: Solar eclipse of September 21, 2025

=== Solar eclipses of 1935–1938 ===
This eclipse is a member of a semester series. An eclipse in a semester series of solar eclipses repeats approximately every 177 days and 4 hours (a semester) at alternating nodes of the Moon's orbit.

The partial solar eclipses on February 3, 1935 and July 30, 1935 occur in the previous lunar year eclipse set.

Solar eclipse series sets from 1935 to 1938
Ascending node			Descending node		
Saros	Map	Gamma	Saros	Map	Gamma
111	January 5, 1935 Partial	−1.5381	116	June 30, 1935 Partial	1.3623
121	December 25, 1935 Annular	−0.9228	126	June 19, 1936 Total	0.5389
131	December 13, 1936 Annular	−0.2493	136 Totality in Kanton Island, Kiribati	June 8, 1937 Total	−0.2253
141	December 2, 1937 Annular	0.4389	146	May 29, 1938 Total	−0.9607
151	November 21, 1938 Partial	1.1077			

=== Saros 151 ===
This eclipse is a part of Saros series 151, repeating every 18 years, 11 days, and containing 72 events. The series started with a partial solar eclipse on August 14, 1776. It contains annular eclipses from February 28, 2101 through April 23, 2191; a hybrid eclipse on May 5, 2209; and total eclipses from May 16, 2227 through July 6, 2912. The series ends at member 72 as a partial eclipse on October 1, 3056. Its eclipses are tabulated in three columns; every third eclipse in the same column is one exeligmos apart, so they all cast shadows over approximately the same parts of the Earth.

The longest duration of annularity will be produced by member 19 at 2 minutes, 44 seconds on February 28, 2101, and the longest duration of totality will be produced by member 60 at 5 minutes, 41 seconds on May 22, 2840. All eclipses in this series occur at the Moon’s ascending node of orbit.

Series members 3–24 occur between 1801 and 2200:
3	4	5
September 5, 1812	September 17, 1830	September 27, 1848
6	7	8
October 8, 1866	October 19, 1884	October 31, 1902
9	10	11
November 10, 1920	November 21, 1938	December 2, 1956
12	13	14
December 13, 1974	December 24, 1992	January 4, 2011
15	16	17
January 14, 2029	January 26, 2047	February 5, 2065
18	19	20
February 16, 2083	February 28, 2101	March 11, 2119
21	22	23
March 21, 2137	April 2, 2155	April 12, 2173
24
April 23, 2191

=== Metonic series ===
The metonic series repeats eclipses every 19 years (6939.69 days), lasting about 5 cycles. Eclipses occur in nearly the same calendar date. In addition, the octon subseries repeats 1/5 of that or every 3.8 years (1387.94 days). All eclipses in this table occur at the Moon's ascending node.

23 eclipse events between February 3, 1859 and June 29, 1946
February 1–3	November 21–22	September 8–10	June 28–29	April 16–18
109	111	113	115	117
February 3, 1859	November 21, 1862		June 28, 1870	April 16, 1874
119	121	123	125	127
February 2, 1878	November 21, 1881	September 8, 1885	June 28, 1889	April 16, 1893
129	131	133	135	137
February 1, 1897	November 22, 1900	September 9, 1904	June 28, 1908	April 17, 1912
139	141	143	145	147
February 3, 1916	November 22, 1919	September 10, 1923	June 29, 1927	April 18, 1931
149	151	153	155	
February 3, 1935	November 21, 1938	September 10, 1942	June 29, 1946	

=== Tritos series ===
This eclipse is a part of a tritos cycle, repeating at alternating nodes every 135 synodic months (≈ 3986.63 days, or 11 years minus 1 month). Their appearance and longitude are irregular due to a lack of synchronization with the anomalistic month (period of perigee), but groupings of 3 tritos cycles (≈ 33 years minus 3 months) come close (≈ 434.044 anomalistic months), so eclipses are similar in these groupings.

Series members between 1801 and 1982
November 29, 1807 (Saros 139)	October 29, 1818 (Saros 140)	September 28, 1829 (Saros 141)	August 27, 1840 (Saros 142)	July 28, 1851 (Saros 143)
June 27, 1862 (Saros 144)	May 26, 1873 (Saros 145)	April 25, 1884 (Saros 146)	March 26, 1895 (Saros 147)	February 23, 1906 (Saros 148)
January 23, 1917 (Saros 149)	December 24, 1927 (Saros 150)	November 21, 1938 (Saros 151)	October 21, 1949 (Saros 152)	September 20, 1960 (Saros 153)
August 20, 1971 (Saros 154)	July 20, 1982 (Saros 155)			

=== Inex series ===
This eclipse is a part of the long period inex cycle, repeating at alternating nodes, every 358 synodic months (≈ 10,571.95 days, or 29 years minus 20 days). Their appearance and longitude are irregular due to a lack of synchronization with the anomalistic month (period of perigee). However, groupings of 3 inex cycles (≈ 87 years minus 2 months) comes close (≈ 1,151.02 anomalistic months), so eclipses are similar in these groupings.

Series members between 1801 and 2200
February 11, 1823 (Saros 147)	January 21, 1852 (Saros 148)	December 31, 1880 (Saros 149)
December 12, 1909 (Saros 150)	November 21, 1938 (Saros 151)	November 2, 1967 (Saros 152)
October 12, 1996 (Saros 153)	September 21, 2025 (Saros 154)	September 2, 2054 (Saros 155)
August 13, 2083 (Saros 156)	July 23, 2112 (Saros 157)	July 3, 2141 (Saros 158)
June 14, 2170 (Saros 159)	May 24, 2199 (Saros 160)	
