= Solar eclipse of December 12, 1909 =

20th-century partial solar eclipse

- Partial eclipse
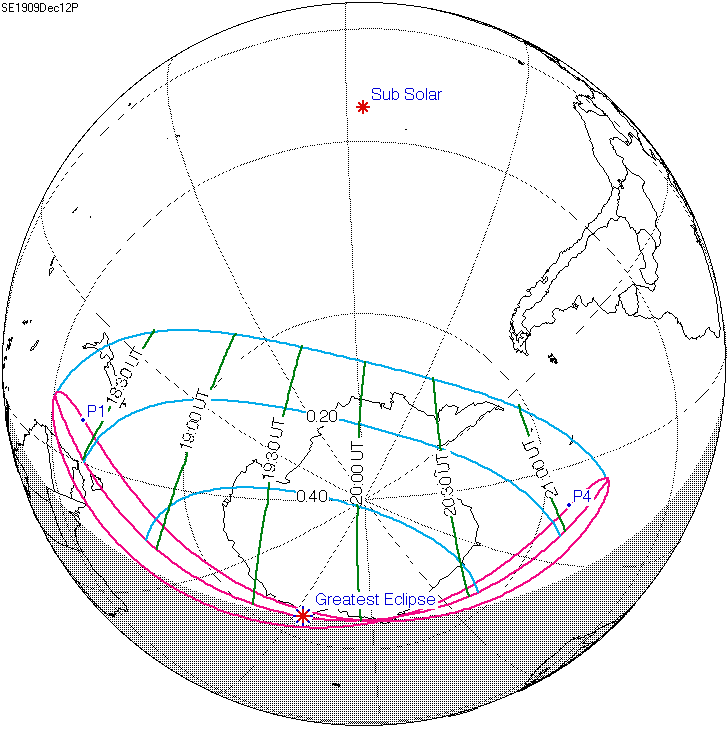
- Map
- Gamma: −1.2456
- Magnitude: 0.5424

Maximum eclipse
- Coordinates: 65°S 86°E

Times (UTC)
- Greatest eclipse: 19:44:48

References
- Saros: 150 (11 of 71)
- Catalog # (SE5000): 9303

A partial solar eclipse occurred at the Moon's descending node of orbit on Sunday, December 12, 1909, with a magnitude of 0.5424. A solar eclipse occurs when the Moon passes between Earth and the Sun, thereby totally or partly obscuring the image of the Sun for a viewer on Earth. A partial solar eclipse occurs in the polar regions of the Earth when the center of the Moon's shadow misses the Earth.

This event was visible as a partial solar eclipse across Antarctica and New Zealand.

== Eclipse details ==
Shown below are two tables displaying details about this particular solar eclipse. The first table outlines times at which the Moon's penumbra or umbra attains the specific parameter, and the second table describes various other parameters pertaining to this eclipse.

December 12, 1909 Solar Eclipse Times
Event	Time (UTC)
First Penumbral External Contact	1909 December 12 at 17:56:19.6 UTC
Greatest Eclipse	1909 December 12 at 19:44:48.1 UTC
Ecliptic Conjunction	1909 December 12 at 19:58:40.0 UTC
Equatorial Conjunction	1909 December 12 at 20:09:23.5 UTC
Last Penumbral External Contact	1909 December 12 at 21:33:01.1 UTC

December 12, 1909 Solar Eclipse Parameters
Parameter	Value
Eclipse Magnitude	0.54243
Eclipse Obscuration	0.42921
Gamma	–1.24559
Sun Right Ascension	17h17m14.6s
Sun Declination	-23°05'16.7"
Sun Semi-Diameter	16'14.8"
Sun Equatorial Horizontal Parallax	08.9"
Moon Right Ascension	17h16m22.9s
Moon Declination	-24°13'34.7"
Moon Semi-Diameter	15'12.2"
Moon Equatorial Horizontal Parallax	0°55'47.8"
ΔT	10.4 s

== Eclipse season ==
This eclipse is part of an eclipse season, a period, roughly every six months, when eclipses occur. Only two (or occasionally three) eclipse seasons occur each year, and each season lasts about 35 days and repeats just short of six months (173 days) later; thus two full eclipse seasons always occur each year. Either two or three eclipses happen each eclipse season. In the sequence below, each eclipse is separated by a fortnight.

Eclipse season of November–December 1909
November 27 Ascending node (full moon)	December 12 Descending node (new moon)
Penumbral lunar eclipse Lunar Saros 124	Annular solar eclipse Solar Saros 150

== Related eclipses ==
=== Eclipses in 1909 ===
- A total lunar eclipse on June 4.
- A hybrid solar eclipse on June 17.
- A total lunar eclipse on November 27.
- A partial solar eclipse on December 12.

=== Metonic ===
- Preceded by: Solar eclipse of February 23, 1906
- Followed by: Solar eclipse of September 30, 1913

=== Tzolkinex ===
- Preceded by: Solar eclipse of October 31, 1902
- Followed by: Solar eclipse of January 23, 1917

=== Half-Saros ===
- Preceded by: Lunar eclipse of December 6, 1900
- Followed by: Lunar eclipse of December 17, 1918

=== Tritos ===
- Preceded by: Solar eclipse of January 11, 1899
- Followed by: Solar eclipse of November 10, 1920

=== Solar Saros 150 ===
- Preceded by: Solar eclipse of December 1, 1891
- Followed by: Solar eclipse of December 24, 1927

=== Inex ===
- Preceded by: Solar eclipse of December 31, 1880
- Followed by: Solar eclipse of November 21, 1938

=== Triad ===
- Preceded by: Solar eclipse of February 11, 1823
- Followed by: Solar eclipse of October 12, 1996

=== Solar eclipses of 1906–1909 ===
This eclipse is a member of a semester series. An eclipse in a semester series of solar eclipses repeats approximately every 177 days and 4 hours (a semester) at alternating nodes of the Moon's orbit.

The partial solar eclipses on February 23, 1906 and August 20, 1906 occur in the previous lunar year eclipse set.

Solar eclipse series sets from 1906 to 1909
Ascending node			Descending node		
Saros	Map	Gamma	Saros	Map	Gamma
115	July 21, 1906 Partial	−1.3637	120	January 14, 1907 Total	0.8628
125	July 10, 1907 Annular	−0.6313	130	January 3, 1908 Total	0.1934
135	June 28, 1908 Annular	0.1389	140	December 23, 1908 Hybrid	−0.4985
145	June 17, 1909 Hybrid	0.8957	150	December 12, 1909 Partial	−1.2456

=== Saros 150 ===
This eclipse is a part of Saros series 150, repeating every 18 years, 11 days, and containing 71 events. The series started with a partial solar eclipse on August 24, 1729. It contains annular eclipses from April 22, 2126 through June 22, 2829. There are no hybrid or total eclipses in this set. The series ends at member 71 as a partial eclipse on September 29, 2991. Its eclipses are tabulated in three columns; every third eclipse in the same column is one exeligmos apart, so they all cast shadows over approximately the same parts of the Earth.

The longest duration of annularity will be produced by member 45 at 9 minutes, 58 seconds on December 19, 2522. All eclipses in this series occur at the Moon’s descending node of orbit.

Series members 5–27 occur between 1801 and 2200:
5	6	7
October 7, 1801	October 19, 1819	October 29, 1837
8	9	10
November 9, 1855	November 20, 1873	December 1, 1891
11	12	13
December 12, 1909	December 24, 1927	January 3, 1946
14	15	16
January 14, 1964	January 25, 1982	February 5, 2000
17	18	19
February 15, 2018	February 27, 2036	March 9, 2054
20	21	22
March 19, 2072	March 31, 2090	April 11, 2108
23	24	25
April 22, 2126	May 3, 2144	May 14, 2162
26	27	
May 24, 2180	June 4, 2198	

=== Metonic series ===
The metonic series repeats eclipses every 19 years (6939.69 days), lasting about 5 cycles. Eclipses occur in nearly the same calendar date. In addition, the octon subseries repeats 1/5 of that or every 3.8 years (1387.94 days). All eclipses in this table occur at the Moon's descending node.

22 eclipse events between February 23, 1830 and July 19, 1917
February 22–23	December 11–12	September 29–30	July 18–19	May 6–7
108	110	112	114	116
February 23, 1830			July 18, 1841	May 6, 1845
118	120	122	124	126
February 23, 1849	December 11, 1852	September 29, 1856	July 18, 1860	May 6, 1864
128	130	132	134	136
February 23, 1868	December 12, 1871	September 29, 1875	July 19, 1879	May 6, 1883
138	140	142	144	146
February 22, 1887	December 12, 1890	September 29, 1894	July 18, 1898	May 7, 1902
148	150	152	154	
February 23, 1906	December 12, 1909	September 30, 1913	July 19, 1917	

=== Tritos series ===
This eclipse is a part of a tritos cycle, repeating at alternating nodes every 135 synodic months (≈ 3986.63 days, or 11 years minus 1 month). Their appearance and longitude are irregular due to a lack of synchronization with the anomalistic month (period of perigee), but groupings of 3 tritos cycles (≈ 33 years minus 3 months) come close (≈ 434.044 anomalistic months), so eclipses are similar in these groupings.

Series members between 1801 and 1964
September 17, 1811 (Saros 141)	August 16, 1822 (Saros 142)	July 17, 1833 (Saros 143)	June 16, 1844 (Saros 144)	May 16, 1855 (Saros 145)
April 15, 1866 (Saros 146)	March 15, 1877 (Saros 147)	February 11, 1888 (Saros 148)	January 11, 1899 (Saros 149)	December 12, 1909 (Saros 150)
November 10, 1920 (Saros 151)	October 11, 1931 (Saros 152)	September 10, 1942 (Saros 153)	August 9, 1953 (Saros 154)	July 9, 1964 (Saros 155)

=== Inex series ===
This eclipse is a part of the long period inex cycle, repeating at alternating nodes, every 358 synodic months (≈ 10,571.95 days, or 29 years minus 20 days). Their appearance and longitude are irregular due to a lack of synchronization with the anomalistic month (period of perigee). However, groupings of 3 inex cycles (≈ 87 years minus 2 months) comes close (≈ 1,151.02 anomalistic months), so eclipses are similar in these groupings.

Series members between 1801 and 2200
February 11, 1823 (Saros 147)	January 21, 1852 (Saros 148)	December 31, 1880 (Saros 149)
December 12, 1909 (Saros 150)	November 21, 1938 (Saros 151)	November 2, 1967 (Saros 152)
October 12, 1996 (Saros 153)	September 21, 2025 (Saros 154)	September 2, 2054 (Saros 155)
August 13, 2083 (Saros 156)	July 23, 2112 (Saros 157)	July 3, 2141 (Saros 158)
June 14, 2170 (Saros 159)	May 24, 2199 (Saros 160)	
