= Solar eclipse of December 23, 1908 =

Total eclipse

- Hybrid eclipse
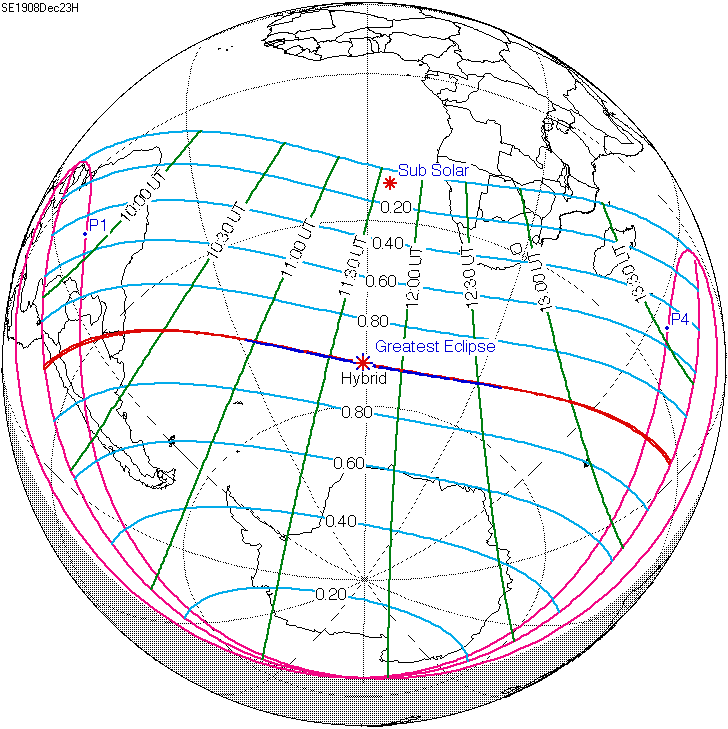
- Map
- Gamma: −0.4985
- Magnitude: 1.0024

Maximum eclipse
- Duration: 12 s (0 min 12 s)
- Coordinates: 53.4°S 0.5°W
- Max. width of band: 10 km (6.2 mi)

Times (UTC)
- Greatest eclipse: 11:44:28

References
- Saros: 140 (23 of 71)
- Catalog # (SE5000): 9301

A total solar eclipse occurred at the Moon's descending node of orbit on Wednesday, December 23, 1908, with a magnitude of 1.0024. It was a hybrid event, with only a fraction of its path as total, and longer sections at the start and end as an annular eclipse. A solar eclipse occurs when the Moon passes between Earth and the Sun, thereby totally or partly obscuring the image of the Sun for a viewer on Earth. A hybrid solar eclipse is a rare type of solar eclipse that changes its appearance from annular to total and back as the Moon's shadow moves across the Earth's surface. Totality occurs between the annularity paths across the surface of the Earth, with the partial solar eclipse visible over a surrounding region thousands of kilometres wide. Occurring about 3.1 days before perigee (on December 26, 1908, at 13:30 UTC), the Moon's apparent diameter was larger.

Annularity was visible from Chile, Argentina, Uruguay and southern Brazil, while totality was visible only from southern Atlantic Ocean with no land. A partial eclipse was visible for parts of northern South America, most of North America, the Caribbean, West Africa, North Africa, and Western Europe.

== Eclipse details ==
Shown below are two tables displaying details about this particular solar eclipse. The first table outlines times at which the Moon's penumbra or umbra attains the specific parameter, and the second table describes various other parameters pertaining to this eclipse.

December 23, 1908 Solar Eclipse Times
Event	Time (UTC)
First Penumbral External Contact	1908 December 23 at 09:06:26.9 UTC
First Umbral External Contact	1908 December 23 at 10:10:43.8 UTC
First Central Line	1908 December 23 at 10:11:10.4 UTC
Greatest Duration	1908 December 23 at 10:11:10.4 UTC
First Umbral Internal Contact	1908 December 23 at 10:11:37.1 UTC
Greatest Eclipse	1908 December 23 at 11:44:27.5 UTC
Equatorial Conjunction	1908 December 23 at 11:49:14.3 UTC
Ecliptic Conjunction	1908 December 23 at 11:49:45.9 UTC
Last Umbral Internal Contact	1908 December 23 at 13:17:16.8 UTC
Last Central Line	1908 December 23 at 13:17:40.9 UTC
Last Umbral External Contact	1908 December 23 at 13:18:04.9 UTC
Last Penumbral External Contact	1908 December 23 at 14:22:20.6 UTC

December 23, 1908 Solar Eclipse Parameters
Parameter	Value
Eclipse Magnitude	1.00243
Eclipse Obscuration	1.00486
Gamma	–0.49845
Sun Right Ascension	18h05m35.3s
Sun Declination	-23°26'42.1"
Sun Semi-Diameter	16'15.7"
Sun Equatorial Horizontal Parallax	08.9"
Moon Right Ascension	18h05m23.9s
Moon Declination	-23°55'54.7"
Moon Semi-Diameter	16'04.3"
Moon Equatorial Horizontal Parallax	0°58'59.0"
ΔT	9.1 s

== Eclipse season ==
This eclipse is part of an eclipse season, a period, roughly every six months, when eclipses occur. Only two (or occasionally three) eclipse seasons occur each year, and each season lasts about 35 days and repeats just short of six months (173 days) later; thus two full eclipse seasons always occur each year. Either two or three eclipses happen each eclipse season. In the sequence below, each eclipse is separated by a fortnight.

Eclipse season of December 1908
December 7 Ascending node (full moon)	December 23 Descending node (new moon)
Penumbral lunar eclipse Lunar Saros 114	Hybrid solar eclipse Solar Saros 140

== Related eclipses ==
=== Eclipses in 1908 ===
- A total solar eclipse on January 3.
- A penumbral lunar eclipse on January 18.
- A penumbral lunar eclipse on June 14.
- An annular solar eclipse on June 28.
- A penumbral lunar eclipse on July 13.
- A penumbral lunar eclipse on December 7.
- A hybrid solar eclipse on December 23.

=== Metonic ===
- Preceded by: Solar eclipse of March 6, 1905
- Followed by: Solar eclipse of October 10, 1912

=== Tzolkinex ===
- Preceded by: Solar eclipse of November 11, 1901
- Followed by: Solar eclipse of February 3, 1916

=== Half-Saros ===
- Preceded by: Lunar eclipse of December 17, 1899
- Followed by: Lunar eclipse of December 28, 1917

=== Tritos ===
- Preceded by: Solar eclipse of January 22, 1898
- Followed by: Solar eclipse of November 22, 1919

=== Solar Saros 140 ===
- Preceded by: Solar eclipse of December 12, 1890
- Followed by: Solar eclipse of January 3, 1927

=== Inex ===
- Preceded by: Solar eclipse of January 11, 1880
- Followed by: Solar eclipse of December 2, 1937

=== Triad ===
- Preceded by: Solar eclipse of February 21, 1822
- Followed by: Solar eclipse of October 24, 1995

=== Solar eclipses of 1906–1909 ===
This eclipse is a member of a semester series. An eclipse in a semester series of solar eclipses repeats approximately every 177 days and 4 hours (a semester) at alternating nodes of the Moon's orbit.

The partial solar eclipses on February 23, 1906 and August 20, 1906 occur in the previous lunar year eclipse set.

Solar eclipse series sets from 1906 to 1909
Ascending node			Descending node		
Saros	Map	Gamma	Saros	Map	Gamma
115	July 21, 1906 Partial	−1.3637	120	January 14, 1907 Total	0.8628
125	July 10, 1907 Annular	−0.6313	130	January 3, 1908 Total	0.1934
135	June 28, 1908 Annular	0.1389	140	December 23, 1908 Hybrid	−0.4985
145	June 17, 1909 Hybrid	0.8957	150	December 12, 1909 Partial	−1.2456

=== Saros 140 ===
This eclipse is a part of Saros series 140, repeating every 18 years, 11 days, and containing 71 events. The series started with a partial solar eclipse on April 16, 1512. It contains total eclipses from July 21, 1656 through November 9, 1836; hybrid eclipses from November 20, 1854 through December 23, 1908; and annular eclipses from January 3, 1927 through December 7, 2485. The series ends at member 71 as a partial eclipse on June 1, 2774. Its eclipses are tabulated in three columns; every third eclipse in the same column is one exeligmos apart, so they all cast shadows over approximately the same parts of the Earth.

The longest duration of totality was produced by member 11 at 4 minutes, 10 seconds on August 12, 1692, and the longest duration of annularity will be produced by member 53 at 7 minutes, 35 seconds on November 15, 2449. All eclipses in this series occur at the Moon’s descending node of orbit.

Series members 18–39 occur between 1801 and 2200:
18	19	20
October 29, 1818	November 9, 1836	November 20, 1854
21	22	23
November 30, 1872	December 12, 1890	December 23, 1908
24	25	26
January 3, 1927	January 14, 1945	January 25, 1963
27	28	29
February 4, 1981	February 16, 1999	February 26, 2017
30	31	32
March 9, 2035	March 20, 2053	March 31, 2071
33	34	35
April 10, 2089	April 23, 2107	May 3, 2125
36	37	38
May 14, 2143	May 25, 2161	June 5, 2179
39
June 15, 2197

=== Metonic series ===
The metonic series repeats eclipses every 19 years (6939.69 days), lasting about 5 cycles. Eclipses occur in nearly the same calendar date. In addition, the octon subseries repeats 1/5 of that or every 3.8 years (1387.94 days). All eclipses in this table occur at the Moon's descending node.

22 eclipse events between March 5, 1848 and July 30, 1935
March 5–6	December 22–24	October 9–11	July 29–30	May 17–18
108	110	112	114	116
March 5, 1848			July 29, 1859	May 17, 1863
118	120	122	124	126
March 6, 1867	December 22, 1870	October 10, 1874	July 29, 1878	May 17, 1882
128	130	132	134	136
March 5, 1886	December 22, 1889	October 9, 1893	July 29, 1897	May 18, 1901
138	140	142	144	146
March 6, 1905	December 23, 1908	October 10, 1912	July 30, 1916	May 18, 1920
148	150	152	154	
March 5, 1924	December 24, 1927	October 11, 1931	July 30, 1935	

=== Tritos series ===
This eclipse is a part of a tritos cycle, repeating at alternating nodes every 135 synodic months (≈ 3986.63 days, or 11 years minus 1 month). Their appearance and longitude are irregular due to a lack of synchronization with the anomalistic month (period of perigee), but groupings of 3 tritos cycles (≈ 33 years minus 3 months) come close (≈ 434.044 anomalistic months), so eclipses are similar in these groupings.

The partial solar eclipses on December 7, 2170 (part of Saros 164) and November 7, 2181 (part of Saros 165) are also a part of this series but are not included in the table below.

Series members between 1801 and 2105
September 28, 1810 (Saros 131)	August 27, 1821 (Saros 132)	July 27, 1832 (Saros 133)	June 27, 1843 (Saros 134)	May 26, 1854 (Saros 135)
April 25, 1865 (Saros 136)	March 25, 1876 (Saros 137)	February 22, 1887 (Saros 138)	January 22, 1898 (Saros 139)	December 23, 1908 (Saros 140)
November 22, 1919 (Saros 141)	October 21, 1930 (Saros 142)	September 21, 1941 (Saros 143)	August 20, 1952 (Saros 144)	July 20, 1963 (Saros 145)
June 20, 1974 (Saros 146)	May 19, 1985 (Saros 147)	April 17, 1996 (Saros 148)	March 19, 2007 (Saros 149)	February 15, 2018 (Saros 150)
January 14, 2029 (Saros 151)	December 15, 2039 (Saros 152)	November 14, 2050 (Saros 153)	October 13, 2061 (Saros 154)	September 12, 2072 (Saros 155)
August 13, 2083 (Saros 156)	July 12, 2094 (Saros 157)	June 12, 2105 (Saros 158)		

=== Inex series ===
This eclipse is a part of the long period inex cycle, repeating at alternating nodes, every 358 synodic months (≈ 10,571.95 days, or 29 years minus 20 days). Their appearance and longitude are irregular due to a lack of synchronization with the anomalistic month (period of perigee). However, groupings of 3 inex cycles (≈ 87 years minus 2 months) comes close (≈ 1,151.02 anomalistic months), so eclipses are similar in these groupings.

Series members between 1801 and 2200
February 21, 1822 (Saros 137)	February 1, 1851 (Saros 138)	January 11, 1880 (Saros 139)
December 23, 1908 (Saros 140)	December 2, 1937 (Saros 141)	November 12, 1966 (Saros 142)
October 24, 1995 (Saros 143)	October 2, 2024 (Saros 144)	September 12, 2053 (Saros 145)
August 24, 2082 (Saros 146)	August 4, 2111 (Saros 147)	July 14, 2140 (Saros 148)
June 25, 2169 (Saros 149)	June 4, 2198 (Saros 150)	
