= Solar eclipse of December 2, 1956 =

20th-century partial solar eclipse

- Partial eclipse
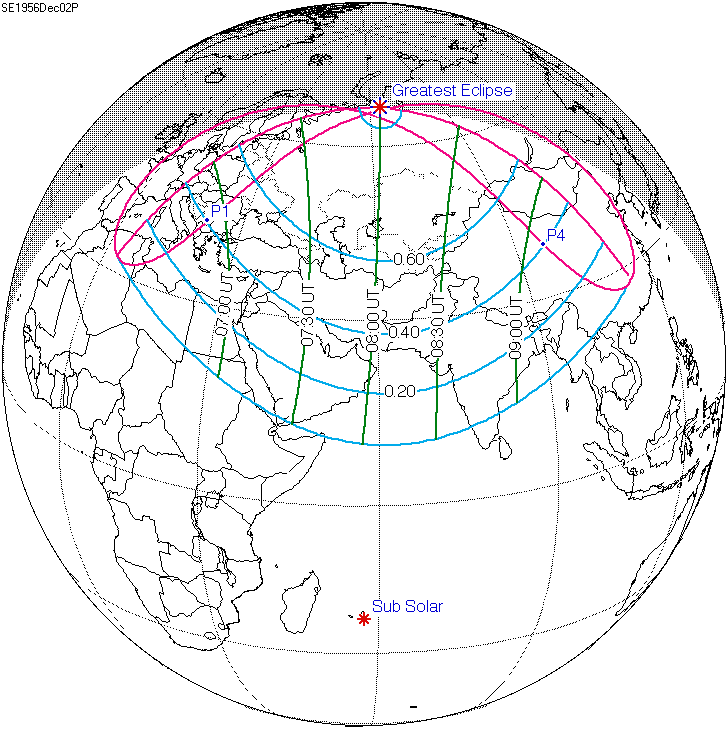
- Map
- Gamma: 1.0923
- Magnitude: 0.8047

Maximum eclipse
- Coordinates: 67.9°N 64.6°E

Times (UTC)
- Greatest eclipse: 8:00:35

References
- Saros: 151 (11 of 72)
- Catalog # (SE5000): 9413

A partial solar eclipse occurred at the Moon's ascending node of orbit on Sunday, December 2, 1956, with a magnitude of 0.8047. A solar eclipse occurs when the Moon passes between Earth and the Sun, thereby totally or partly obscuring the image of the Sun for a viewer on Earth. A partial solar eclipse occurs in the polar regions of the Earth when the center of the Moon's shadow misses the Earth.

A partial eclipse was visible for parts of Europe, Northeast Africa, and Asia.

== Eclipse details ==
Shown below are two tables displaying details about this particular solar eclipse. The first table outlines times at which the Moon's penumbra or umbra attains the specific parameter, and the second table describes various other parameters pertaining to this eclipse.

December 2, 1956 Solar Eclipse Times
Event	Time (UTC)
First Penumbral External Contact	1956 December 02 at 05:52:09.3 UTC
Equatorial Conjunction	1956 December 02 at 07:54:38.5 UTC
Greatest Eclipse	1956 December 02 at 08:00:35.0 UTC
Ecliptic Conjunction	1956 December 02 at 08:13:02.5 UTC
Last Penumbral External Contact	1956 December 02 at 10:09:08.8 UTC

December 2, 1956 Solar Eclipse Parameters
Parameter	Value
Eclipse Magnitude	0.80468
Eclipse Obscuration	0.73350
Gamma	1.09229
Sun Right Ascension	16h34m00.8s
Sun Declination	-21°58'22.1"
Sun Semi-Diameter	16'13.5"
Sun Equatorial Horizontal Parallax	08.9"
Moon Right Ascension	16h34m13.1s
Moon Declination	-20°57'44.2"
Moon Semi-Diameter	15'10.9"
Moon Equatorial Horizontal Parallax	0°55'43.2"
ΔT	31.7 s

== Eclipse season ==
This eclipse is part of an eclipse season, a period, roughly every six months, when eclipses occur. Only two (or occasionally three) eclipse seasons occur each year, and each season lasts about 35 days and repeats just short of six months (173 days) later; thus two full eclipse seasons always occur each year. Either two or three eclipses happen each eclipse season. In the sequence below, each eclipse is separated by a fortnight.

Eclipse season of November–December 1956
November 18 Descending node (full moon)	December 2 Ascending node (new moon)
Total lunar eclipse Lunar Saros 125	Partial solar eclipse Solar Saros 151

== Related eclipses ==
=== Eclipses in 1956 ===
- A partial lunar eclipse on May 24.
- A total solar eclipse on June 8.
- A total lunar eclipse on November 18.
- A partial solar eclipse on December 2.

=== Metonic ===
- Preceded by: Solar eclipse of February 14, 1953
- Followed by: Solar eclipse of September 20, 1960

=== Tzolkinex ===
- Preceded by: Solar eclipse of October 21, 1949
- Followed by: Solar eclipse of January 14, 1964

=== Half-Saros ===
- Preceded by: Lunar eclipse of November 28, 1947
- Followed by: Lunar eclipse of December 8, 1965

=== Tritos ===
- Preceded by: Solar eclipse of January 3, 1946
- Followed by: Solar eclipse of November 2, 1967

=== Solar Saros 151 ===
- Preceded by: Solar eclipse of November 21, 1938
- Followed by: Solar eclipse of December 13, 1974

=== Inex ===
- Preceded by: Solar eclipse of December 24, 1927
- Followed by: Solar eclipse of November 12, 1985

=== Triad ===
- Preceded by: Solar eclipse of January 31, 1870
- Followed by: Solar eclipse of October 3, 2043

=== Solar eclipses of 1953–1956 ===
This eclipse is a member of a semester series. An eclipse in a semester series of solar eclipses repeats approximately every 177 days and 4 hours (a semester) at alternating nodes of the Moon's orbit.

The partial solar eclipses on February 14, 1953 and August 9, 1953 occur in the previous lunar year eclipse set.

Solar eclipse series sets from 1953 to 1956
Descending node			Ascending node		
Saros	Map	Gamma	Saros	Map	Gamma
116	July 11, 1953 Partial	1.4388	121	January 5, 1954 Annular	−0.9296
126	June 30, 1954 Total	0.6135	131	December 25, 1954 Annular	−0.2576
136	June 20, 1955 Total	−0.1528	141	December 14, 1955 Annular	0.4266
146	June 8, 1956 Total	−0.8934	151	December 2, 1956 Partial	1.0923

=== Saros 151 ===
This eclipse is a part of Saros series 151, repeating every 18 years, 11 days, and containing 72 events. The series started with a partial solar eclipse on August 14, 1776. It contains annular eclipses from February 28, 2101 through April 23, 2191; a hybrid eclipse on May 5, 2209; and total eclipses from May 16, 2227 through July 6, 2912. The series ends at member 72 as a partial eclipse on October 1, 3056. Its eclipses are tabulated in three columns; every third eclipse in the same column is one exeligmos apart, so they all cast shadows over approximately the same parts of the Earth.

The longest duration of annularity will be produced by member 19 at 2 minutes, 44 seconds on February 28, 2101, and the longest duration of totality will be produced by member 60 at 5 minutes, 41 seconds on May 22, 2840. All eclipses in this series occur at the Moon’s ascending node of orbit.

Series members 3–24 occur between 1801 and 2200:
3	4	5
September 5, 1812	September 17, 1830	September 27, 1848
6	7	8
October 8, 1866	October 19, 1884	October 31, 1902
9	10	11
November 10, 1920	November 21, 1938	December 2, 1956
12	13	14
December 13, 1974	December 24, 1992	January 4, 2011
15	16	17
January 14, 2029	January 26, 2047	February 5, 2065
18	19	20
February 16, 2083	February 28, 2101	March 11, 2119
21	22	23
March 21, 2137	April 2, 2155	April 12, 2173
24
April 23, 2191

=== Metonic series ===
The metonic series repeats eclipses every 19 years (6939.69 days), lasting about 5 cycles. Eclipses occur in nearly the same calendar date. In addition, the octon subseries repeats 1/5 of that or every 3.8 years (1387.94 days). All eclipses in this table occur at the Moon's ascending node.

22 eclipse events between December 2, 1880 and July 9, 1964
December 2–3	September 20–21	July 9–10	April 26–28	February 13–14
111	113	115	117	119
December 2, 1880		July 9, 1888	April 26, 1892	February 13, 1896
121	123	125	127	129
December 3, 1899	September 21, 1903	July 10, 1907	April 28, 1911	February 14, 1915
131	133	135	137	139
December 3, 1918	September 21, 1922	July 9, 1926	April 28, 1930	February 14, 1934
141	143	145	147	149
December 2, 1937	September 21, 1941	July 9, 1945	April 28, 1949	February 14, 1953
151	153	155		
December 2, 1956	September 20, 1960	July 9, 1964		

=== Tritos series ===
This eclipse is a part of a tritos cycle, repeating at alternating nodes every 135 synodic months (≈ 3986.63 days, or 11 years minus 1 month). Their appearance and longitude are irregular due to a lack of synchronization with the anomalistic month (period of perigee), but groupings of 3 tritos cycles (≈ 33 years minus 3 months) come close (≈ 434.044 anomalistic months), so eclipses are similar in these groupings.

The partial solar eclipse on October 24, 2098 (part of Saros 164) is also a part of this series but is not included in the table below.

Series members between 1801 and 2011
February 11, 1804 (Saros 137)	January 10, 1815 (Saros 138)	December 9, 1825 (Saros 139)	November 9, 1836 (Saros 140)	October 9, 1847 (Saros 141)
September 7, 1858 (Saros 142)	August 7, 1869 (Saros 143)	July 7, 1880 (Saros 144)	June 6, 1891 (Saros 145)	May 7, 1902 (Saros 146)
April 6, 1913 (Saros 147)	March 5, 1924 (Saros 148)	February 3, 1935 (Saros 149)	January 3, 1946 (Saros 150)	December 2, 1956 (Saros 151)
November 2, 1967 (Saros 152)	October 2, 1978 (Saros 153)	August 31, 1989 (Saros 154)	July 31, 2000 (Saros 155)	July 1, 2011 (Saros 156)

=== Inex series ===
This eclipse is a part of the long period inex cycle, repeating at alternating nodes, every 358 synodic months (≈ 10,571.95 days, or 29 years minus 20 days). Their appearance and longitude are irregular due to a lack of synchronization with the anomalistic month (period of perigee). However, groupings of 3 inex cycles (≈ 87 years minus 2 months) comes close (≈ 1,151.02 anomalistic months), so eclipses are similar in these groupings.

Series members between 1801 and 2200
March 13, 1812 (Saros 146)	February 21, 1841 (Saros 147)	January 31, 1870 (Saros 148)
January 11, 1899 (Saros 149)	December 24, 1927 (Saros 150)	December 2, 1956 (Saros 151)
November 12, 1985 (Saros 152)	October 23, 2014 (Saros 153)	October 3, 2043 (Saros 154)
September 12, 2072 (Saros 155)	August 24, 2101 (Saros 156)	August 4, 2130 (Saros 157)
July 15, 2159 (Saros 158)	June 24, 2188 (Saros 159)	
