= Solar eclipse of April 6, 1913 =

20th-century partial solar eclipse

- Partial eclipse
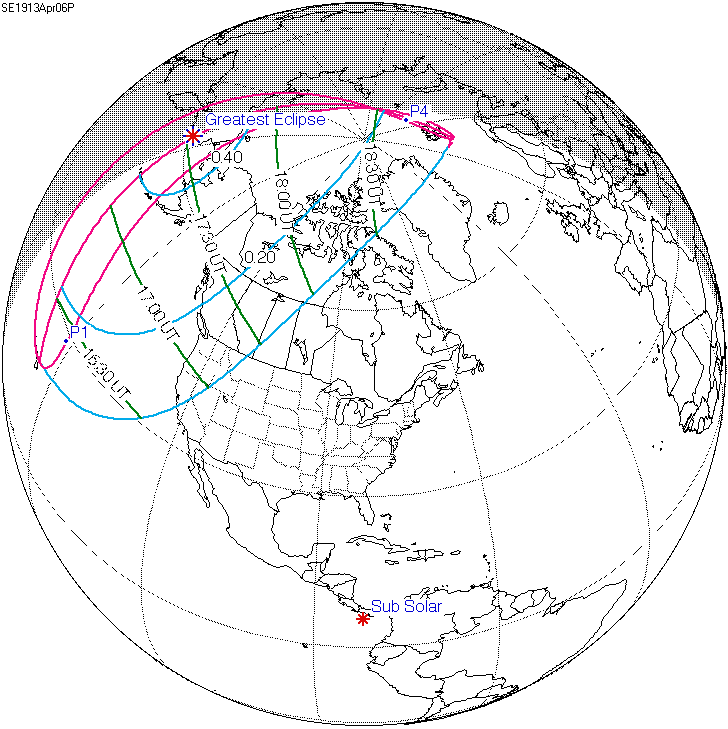
- Map
- Gamma: 1.3147
- Magnitude: 0.4244

Maximum eclipse
- Coordinates: 61.2°N 175.7°E

Times (UTC)
- Greatest eclipse: 17:33:07

References
- Saros: 147 (17 of 80)
- Catalog # (SE5000): 9310

A partial solar eclipse occurred at the Moon's ascending node of orbit on Sunday, April 6, 1913, with a magnitude of 0.4244. A solar eclipse occurs when the Moon passes between Earth and the Sun, thereby totally or partly obscuring the image of the Sun for a viewer on Earth. A partial solar eclipse occurs in the polar regions of the Earth when the center of the Moon's shadow misses the Earth.

A partial eclipse was visible for parts of eastern Russia, northwestern North America.

== Eclipse details ==
Shown below are two tables displaying details about this particular solar eclipse. The first table outlines times at which the Moon's penumbra or umbra attains the specific parameter, and the second table describes various other parameters pertaining to this eclipse.

April 6, 1913 Solar Eclipse Times
Event	Time (UTC)
First Penumbral External Contact	1913 April 6 at 15:54:06.5 UTC
Greatest Eclipse	1913 April 6 at 17:33:07.1 UTC
Ecliptic Conjunction	1913 April 6 at 17:48:01.1 UTC
Equatorial Conjunction	1913 April 6 at 18:55:10.9 UTC
Last Penumbral External Contact	1913 April 6 at 19:11:31.1 UTC

April 6, 1913 Solar Eclipse Parameters
Parameter	Value
Eclipse Magnitude	0.42437
Eclipse Obscuration	0.30366
Gamma	1.31475
Sun Right Ascension	01h00m06.2s
Sun Declination	+06°25'02.8"
Sun Semi-Diameter	15'58.5"
Sun Equatorial Horizontal Parallax	08.8"
Moon Right Ascension	00h57m49.4s
Moon Declination	+07°28'25.6"
Moon Semi-Diameter	14'56.5"
Moon Equatorial Horizontal Parallax	0°54'50.2"
ΔT	15.0 s

== Eclipse season ==
This eclipse is part of an eclipse season, a period, roughly every six months, when eclipses occur. Only two (or occasionally three) eclipse seasons occur each year, and each season lasts about 35 days and repeats just short of six months (173 days) later; thus two full eclipse seasons always occur each year. Either two or three eclipses happen each eclipse season. In the sequence below, each eclipse is separated by a fortnight.

Eclipse season of March–April 1913
March 22 Descending node (full moon)	April 6 Ascending node (new moon)
Total lunar eclipse Lunar Saros 121	Partial solar eclipse Solar Saros 147

== Related eclipses ==
=== Eclipses in 1913 ===
- A total lunar eclipse on March 22.
- A partial solar eclipse on April 6.
- A partial solar eclipse on August 31.
- A total lunar eclipse on September 15.
- A partial solar eclipse on September 30.

=== Metonic ===
- Preceded by: Solar eclipse of June 17, 1909
- Followed by: Solar eclipse of January 23, 1917

=== Tzolkinex ===
- Preceded by: Solar eclipse of February 23, 1906
- Followed by: Solar eclipse of May 18, 1920

=== Half-Saros ===
- Preceded by: Lunar eclipse of March 31, 1904
- Followed by: Lunar eclipse of April 11, 1922

=== Tritos ===
- Preceded by: Solar eclipse of May 7, 1902
- Followed by: Solar eclipse of March 5, 1924

=== Solar Saros 147 ===
- Preceded by: Solar eclipse of March 26, 1895
- Followed by: Solar eclipse of April 18, 1931

=== Inex ===
- Preceded by: Solar eclipse of April 25, 1884
- Followed by: Solar eclipse of March 16, 1942

=== Triad ===
- Preceded by: Solar eclipse of June 5, 1826
- Followed by: Solar eclipse of February 5, 2000

=== Solar eclipses of 1910–1913 ===
This eclipse is a member of a semester series. An eclipse in a semester series of solar eclipses repeats approximately every 177 days and 4 hours (a semester) at alternating nodes of the Moon's orbit.

The partial solar eclipse on August 31, 1913 occurs in the next lunar year eclipse set.

Solar eclipse series sets from 1910 to 1913
Ascending node			Descending node		
Saros	Map	Gamma	Saros	Map	Gamma
117	May 9, 1910 Total	−0.9437	122	November 2, 1910 Partial	1.0603
127	April 28, 1911 Total	−0.2294	132	October 22, 1911 Annular	0.3224
137	April 17, 1912 Hybrid	0.528	142	October 10, 1912 Total	−0.4149
147	April 6, 1913 Partial	1.3147	152	September 30, 1913 Partial	−1.1005

=== Saros 147 ===
This eclipse is a part of Saros series 147, repeating every 18 years, 11 days, and containing 80 events. The series started with a partial solar eclipse on October 12, 1624. It contains annular eclipses from May 31, 2003 through July 31, 2706. There are no hybrid or total eclipses in this set. The series ends at member 80 as a partial eclipse on February 24, 3049. Its eclipses are tabulated in three columns; every third eclipse in the same column is one exeligmos apart, so they all cast shadows over approximately the same parts of the Earth.

The longest duration of annularity will be produced by member 38 at 9 minutes, 41 seconds on November 21, 2291. All eclipses in this series occur at the Moon’s ascending node of orbit.

Series members 11–32 occur between 1801 and 2200:
11	12	13
January 30, 1805	February 11, 1823	February 21, 1841
14	15	16
March 4, 1859	March 15, 1877	March 26, 1895
17	18	19
April 6, 1913	April 18, 1931	April 28, 1949
20	21	22
May 9, 1967	May 19, 1985	May 31, 2003
23	24	25
June 10, 2021	June 21, 2039	July 1, 2057
26	27	28
July 13, 2075	July 23, 2093	August 4, 2111
29	30	31
August 15, 2129	August 26, 2147	September 5, 2165
32
September 16, 2183

=== Metonic series ===
The metonic series repeats eclipses every 19 years (6939.69 days), lasting about 5 cycles. Eclipses occur in nearly the same calendar date. In addition, the octon subseries repeats 1/5 of that or every 3.8 years (1387.94 days). All eclipses in this table occur at the Moon's ascending node.

25 eclipse events between April 5, 1837 and June 17, 1928
April 5–6	January 22–23	November 10–11	August 28–30	June 17–18
107	109	111	113	115
April 5, 1837	January 22, 1841	November 10, 1844	August 28, 1848	June 17, 1852
117	119	121	123	125
April 5, 1856	January 23, 1860	November 11, 1863	August 29, 1867	June 18, 1871
127	129	131	133	135
April 6, 1875	January 22, 1879	November 10, 1882	August 29, 1886	June 17, 1890
137	139	141	143	145
April 6, 1894	January 22, 1898	November 11, 1901	August 30, 1905	June 17, 1909
147	149	151	153	155
April 6, 1913	January 23, 1917	November 10, 1920	August 30, 1924	June 17, 1928

=== Tritos series ===
This eclipse is a part of a tritos cycle, repeating at alternating nodes every 135 synodic months (≈ 3986.63 days, or 11 years minus 1 month). Their appearance and longitude are irregular due to a lack of synchronization with the anomalistic month (period of perigee), but groupings of 3 tritos cycles (≈ 33 years minus 3 months) come close (≈ 434.044 anomalistic months), so eclipses are similar in these groupings.

The partial solar eclipse on October 24, 2098 (part of Saros 164) is also a part of this series but is not included in the table below.

Series members between 1801 and 2011
February 11, 1804 (Saros 137)	January 10, 1815 (Saros 138)	December 9, 1825 (Saros 139)	November 9, 1836 (Saros 140)	October 9, 1847 (Saros 141)
September 7, 1858 (Saros 142)	August 7, 1869 (Saros 143)	July 7, 1880 (Saros 144)	June 6, 1891 (Saros 145)	May 7, 1902 (Saros 146)
April 6, 1913 (Saros 147)	March 5, 1924 (Saros 148)	February 3, 1935 (Saros 149)	January 3, 1946 (Saros 150)	December 2, 1956 (Saros 151)
November 2, 1967 (Saros 152)	October 2, 1978 (Saros 153)	August 31, 1989 (Saros 154)	July 31, 2000 (Saros 155)	July 1, 2011 (Saros 156)

=== Inex series ===
This eclipse is a part of the long period inex cycle, repeating at alternating nodes, every 358 synodic months (≈ 10,571.95 days, or 29 years minus 20 days). Their appearance and longitude are irregular due to a lack of synchronization with the anomalistic month (period of perigee). However, groupings of 3 inex cycles (≈ 87 years minus 2 months) comes close (≈ 1,151.02 anomalistic months), so eclipses are similar in these groupings.

Series members between 1801 and 2200
June 5, 1826 (Saros 144)	May 16, 1855 (Saros 145)	April 25, 1884 (Saros 146)
April 6, 1913 (Saros 147)	March 16, 1942 (Saros 148)	February 25, 1971 (Saros 149)
February 5, 2000 (Saros 150)	January 14, 2029 (Saros 151)	December 26, 2057 (Saros 152)
December 6, 2086 (Saros 153)	November 16, 2115 (Saros 154)	October 26, 2144 (Saros 155)
October 7, 2173 (Saros 156)		
