= Solar eclipse of October 10, 1912 =

Total eclipse

- Total eclipse
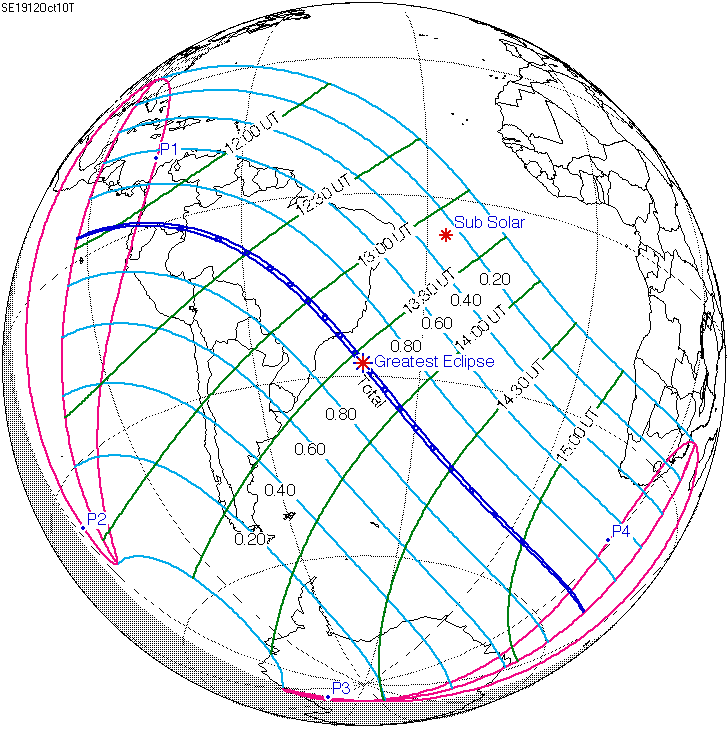
- Map
- Gamma: −0.4149
- Magnitude: 1.0229

Maximum eclipse
- Duration: 115 s (1 min 55 s)
- Coordinates: 28.1°S 40.1°W
- Max. width of band: 85 km (53 mi)

Times (UTC)
- Greatest eclipse: 13:36:14

References
- Saros: 142 (17 of 72)
- Catalog # (SE5000): 9309

A total solar eclipse occurred at the Moon's descending node of orbit on Thursday, October 10, 1912, with a magnitude of 1.0229. A solar eclipse occurs when the Moon passes between Earth and the Sun, thereby totally or partly obscuring the image of the Sun for a viewer on Earth. A total solar eclipse occurs when the Moon's apparent diameter is larger than the Sun's, blocking all direct sunlight, turning day into darkness. Totality occurs in a narrow path across Earth's surface, with the partial solar eclipse visible over a surrounding region thousands of kilometres wide. Occurring about 2.8 days after perigee (on October 7, 1912, at 18:50 UTC), the Moon's apparent diameter was larger.

Totality was visible from Ecuador, Colombia, northern tip of Peru and Brazil. A partial eclipse was visible for parts of Central America, the Caribbean, South America, Antarctica, and Southern Africa.

== Observation ==
German physicist, mathematician and astronomer Johann Georg von Soldner calculated the gravitational lens effect in an article published in 1801. Albert Einstein got similar values in 1911, and proposed verifying it by observing the stars around the sun. The only feasible way at that time was observing during a total solar eclipse, when the sun is totally blocked. This was the first total solar eclipse after that. Local teams from Brazil and international teams from the United Kingdom, France, the German Empire, Argentina and Chile made attempts in Brazil. However, it rained throughout almost the whole path of totality, and all teams failed.

== Eclipse details ==
Shown below are two tables displaying details about this particular solar eclipse. The first table outlines times at which the Moon's penumbra or umbra attains the specific parameter, and the second table describes various other parameters pertaining to this eclipse.

October 10, 1912 Solar Eclipse Times
Event	Time (UTC)
First Penumbral External Contact	1912 October 10 at 10:57:15.4 UTC
First Umbral External Contact	1912 October 10 at 11:58:42.7 UTC
First Central Line	1912 October 10 at 11:58:57.3 UTC
First Umbral Internal Contact	1912 October 10 at 11:59:12.0 UTC
First Penumbral Internal Contact	1912 October 10 at 13:16:22.6 UTC
Greatest Duration	1912 October 10 at 13:35:21.8 UTC
Greatest Eclipse	1912 October 10 at 13:36:13.5 UTC
Ecliptic Conjunction	1912 October 10 at 13:40:37.9 UTC
Last Penumbral Internal Contact	1912 October 10 at 13:55:30.8 UTC
Equatorial Conjunction	1912 October 10 at 14:00:01.6 UTC
Last Umbral Internal Contact	1912 October 10 at 15:13:03.4 UTC
Last Central Line	1912 October 10 at 15:13:15.6 UTC
Last Umbral External Contact	1912 October 10 at 15:13:27.7 UTC
Last Penumbral External Contact	1912 October 10 at 16:15:07.6 UTC

October 10, 1912 Solar Eclipse Parameters
Parameter	Value
Eclipse Magnitude	1.02287
Eclipse Obscuration	1.04625
Gamma	−0.41487
Sun Right Ascension	13h02m12.2s
Sun Declination	-06°38'03.1"
Sun Semi-Diameter	16'01.4"
Sun Equatorial Horizontal Parallax	08.8"
Moon Right Ascension	13h01m25.4s
Moon Declination	-06°59'39.3"
Moon Semi-Diameter	16'08.7"
Moon Equatorial Horizontal Parallax	0°59'15.3"
ΔT	14.3 s

== Eclipse season ==
This eclipse is part of an eclipse season, a period, roughly every six months, when eclipses occur. Only two (or occasionally three) eclipse seasons occur each year, and each season lasts about 35 days and repeats just short of six months (173 days) later; thus two full eclipse seasons always occur each year. Either two or three eclipses happen each eclipse season. In the sequence below, each eclipse is separated by a fortnight.

Eclipse season of September–October 1912
September 26 Ascending node (full moon)	October 10 Descending node (new moon)
Partial lunar eclipse Lunar Saros 116	Total solar eclipse Solar Saros 142

== Related eclipses ==
=== Eclipses in 1912 ===
- A partial lunar eclipse on April 1.
- A hybrid solar eclipse on April 17.
- A partial lunar eclipse on September 26.
- A total solar eclipse on October 10.

=== Metonic ===
- Preceded by: Solar eclipse of December 23, 1908
- Followed by: Solar eclipse of July 30, 1916

=== Tzolkinex ===
- Preceded by: Solar eclipse of August 30, 1905
- Followed by: Solar eclipse of November 22, 1919

=== Half-Saros ===
- Preceded by: Lunar eclipse of October 6, 1903
- Followed by: Lunar eclipse of October 16, 1921

=== Tritos ===
- Preceded by: Solar eclipse of November 11, 1901
- Followed by: Solar eclipse of September 10, 1923

=== Solar Saros 142 ===
- Preceded by: Solar eclipse of September 29, 1894
- Followed by: Solar eclipse of October 21, 1930

=== Inex ===
- Preceded by: Solar eclipse of October 30, 1883
- Followed by: Solar eclipse of September 21, 1941

=== Triad ===
- Preceded by: Solar eclipse of December 9, 1825
- Followed by: Solar eclipse of August 11, 1999

=== Solar eclipses of 1910–1913 ===
This eclipse is a member of a semester series. An eclipse in a semester series of solar eclipses repeats approximately every 177 days and 4 hours (a semester) at alternating nodes of the Moon's orbit.

The partial solar eclipse on August 31, 1913 occurs in the next lunar year eclipse set.

Solar eclipse series sets from 1910 to 1913
Ascending node			Descending node		
Saros	Map	Gamma	Saros	Map	Gamma
117	May 9, 1910 Total	−0.9437	122	November 2, 1910 Partial	1.0603
127	April 28, 1911 Total	−0.2294	132	October 22, 1911 Annular	0.3224
137	April 17, 1912 Hybrid	0.528	142	October 10, 1912 Total	−0.4149
147	April 6, 1913 Partial	1.3147	152	September 30, 1913 Partial	−1.1005

=== Saros 142 ===
This eclipse is a part of Saros series 142, repeating every 18 years, 11 days, and containing 72 events. The series started with a partial solar eclipse on April 17, 1624. It contains a hybrid eclipse on July 14, 1768, and total eclipses from July 25, 1786 through October 29, 2543. There are no annular eclipses in this set. The series ends at member 72 as a partial eclipse on June 5, 2904. Its eclipses are tabulated in three columns; every third eclipse in the same column is one exeligmos apart, so they all cast shadows over approximately the same parts of the Earth.

The longest duration of totality will be produced by member 38 at 6 minutes, 34 seconds on May 28, 2291. All eclipses in this series occur at the Moon’s descending node of orbit.

Series members 11–32 occur between 1801 and 2200:
11	12	13
August 5, 1804	August 16, 1822	August 27, 1840
14	15	16
September 7, 1858	September 17, 1876	September 29, 1894
17	18	19
October 10, 1912	October 21, 1930	November 1, 1948
20	21	22
November 12, 1966	November 22, 1984	December 4, 2002
23	24	25
December 14, 2020	December 26, 2038	January 5, 2057
26	27	28
January 16, 2075	January 27, 2093	February 8, 2111
29	30	31
February 18, 2129	March 2, 2147	March 12, 2165
32
March 23, 2183

=== Metonic series ===
The metonic series repeats eclipses every 19 years (6939.69 days), lasting about 5 cycles. Eclipses occur in nearly the same calendar date. In addition, the octon subseries repeats 1/5 of that or every 3.8 years (1387.94 days). All eclipses in this table occur at the Moon's descending node.

22 eclipse events between March 5, 1848 and July 30, 1935
March 5–6	December 22–24	October 9–11	July 29–30	May 17–18
108	110	112	114	116
March 5, 1848			July 29, 1859	May 17, 1863
118	120	122	124	126
March 6, 1867	December 22, 1870	October 10, 1874	July 29, 1878	May 17, 1882
128	130	132	134	136
March 5, 1886	December 22, 1889	October 9, 1893	July 29, 1897	May 18, 1901
138	140	142	144	146
March 6, 1905	December 23, 1908	October 10, 1912	July 30, 1916	May 18, 1920
148	150	152	154	
March 5, 1924	December 24, 1927	October 11, 1931	July 30, 1935	

=== Tritos series ===
This eclipse is a part of a tritos cycle, repeating at alternating nodes every 135 synodic months (≈ 3986.63 days, or 11 years minus 1 month). Their appearance and longitude are irregular due to a lack of synchronization with the anomalistic month (period of perigee), but groupings of 3 tritos cycles (≈ 33 years minus 3 months) come close (≈ 434.044 anomalistic months), so eclipses are similar in these groupings.

Series members between 1801 and 2087
August 17, 1803 (Saros 132)	July 17, 1814 (Saros 133)	June 16, 1825 (Saros 134)	May 15, 1836 (Saros 135)	April 15, 1847 (Saros 136)
March 15, 1858 (Saros 137)	February 11, 1869 (Saros 138)	January 11, 1880 (Saros 139)	December 12, 1890 (Saros 140)	November 11, 1901 (Saros 141)
October 10, 1912 (Saros 142)	September 10, 1923 (Saros 143)	August 10, 1934 (Saros 144)	July 9, 1945 (Saros 145)	June 8, 1956 (Saros 146)
May 9, 1967 (Saros 147)	April 7, 1978 (Saros 148)	March 7, 1989 (Saros 149)	February 5, 2000 (Saros 150)	January 4, 2011 (Saros 151)
December 4, 2021 (Saros 152)	November 3, 2032 (Saros 153)	October 3, 2043 (Saros 154)	September 2, 2054 (Saros 155)	August 2, 2065 (Saros 156)
July 1, 2076 (Saros 157)	June 1, 2087 (Saros 158)			

=== Inex series ===
This eclipse is a part of the long period inex cycle, repeating at alternating nodes, every 358 synodic months (≈ 10,571.95 days, or 29 years minus 20 days). Their appearance and longitude are irregular due to a lack of synchronization with the anomalistic month (period of perigee). However, groupings of 3 inex cycles (≈ 87 years minus 2 months) comes close (≈ 1,151.02 anomalistic months), so eclipses are similar in these groupings.

Series members between 1801 and 2200
December 9, 1825 (Saros 139)	November 20, 1854 (Saros 140)	October 30, 1883 (Saros 141)
October 10, 1912 (Saros 142)	September 21, 1941 (Saros 143)	August 31, 1970 (Saros 144)
August 11, 1999 (Saros 145)	July 22, 2028 (Saros 146)	July 1, 2057 (Saros 147)
June 11, 2086 (Saros 148)	May 24, 2115 (Saros 149)	May 3, 2144 (Saros 150)
April 12, 2173 (Saros 151)		

== Additional reading ==
- Paolantonio, Santiago (2019). "Eclipse de 1912 en Brasil. Primera tentativa de medir la deflexión de la luz y comparar con el valor propuesto por Einstein de 1911" [Eclipse of 1912 in Brazil. First attempt to measure the deflection of light and its comparison with the value proposed by Einstein in 1911]. Revista Brasileira de Ensino de Física (in Spanish). 41 (suppl 1). doi:10.1590/1806-9126-rbef-2019-0206. ISSN 1806-9126. S2CID 213858006.
