= Solar eclipse of October 2, 1978 =

20th-century partial solar eclipse

- Partial eclipse
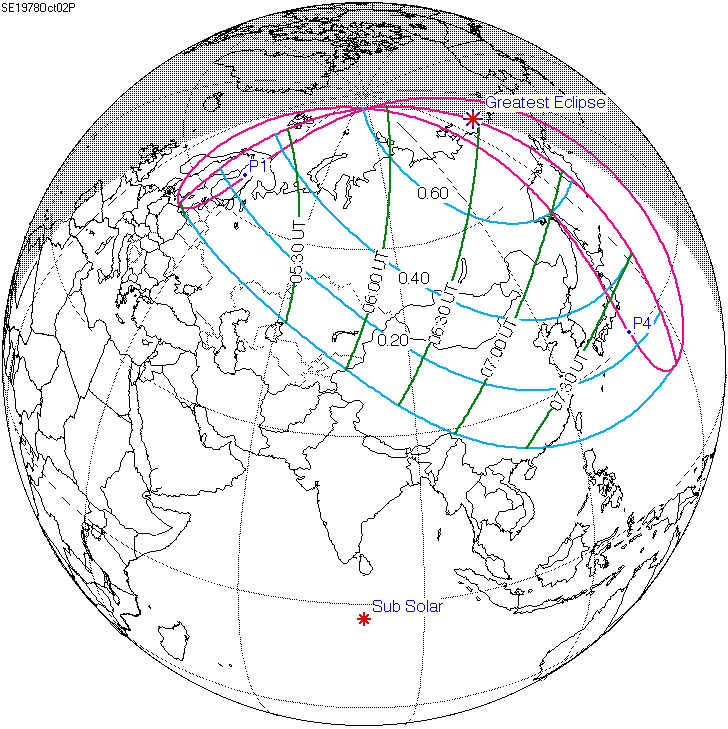
- Map
- Gamma: 1.1616
- Magnitude: 0.6905

Maximum eclipse
- Coordinates: 72°N 159.6°E

Times (UTC)
- Greatest eclipse: 6:28:43

References
- Saros: 153 (7 of 70)
- Catalog # (SE5000): 9461

A partial solar eclipse occurred at the Moon's ascending node of orbit on Monday, October 2, 1978, with a magnitude of 0.6905. A solar eclipse occurs when the Moon passes between Earth and the Sun, thereby totally or partly obscuring the image of the Sun for a viewer on Earth. A partial solar eclipse occurs in the polar regions of the Earth when the center of the Moon's shadow misses the Earth.

A partial eclipse was visible for parts of North Asia and East Asia.

== Eclipse details ==
Shown below are two tables displaying details about this particular solar eclipse. The first table outlines times at which the Moon's penumbra or umbra attains the specific parameter, and the second table describes various other parameters pertaining to this eclipse.

October 2, 1978 Solar Eclipse Times
Event	Time (UTC)
First Penumbral External Contact	1978 October 2 at 04:31:44.0 UTC
Equatorial Conjunction	1978 October 2 at 05:46:52.4 UTC
Greatest Eclipse	1978 October 2 at 06:28:43.3 UTC
Ecliptic Conjunction	1978 October 2 at 06:41:27.8 UTC
Last Penumbral External Contact	1978 October 2 at 08:25:57.0 UTC

October 2, 1978 Solar Eclipse Parameters
Parameter	Value
Eclipse Magnitude	0.69055
Eclipse Obscuration	0.60402
Gamma	1.16164
Sun Right Ascension	12h32m00.9s
Sun Declination	-03°27'16.5"
Sun Semi-Diameter	15'58.8"
Sun Equatorial Horizontal Parallax	08.8"
Moon Right Ascension	12h33m20.1s
Moon Declination	-02°25'05.3"
Moon Semi-Diameter	15'20.8"
Moon Equatorial Horizontal Parallax	0°56'19.5"
ΔT	49.3 s

== Eclipse season ==
This eclipse is part of an eclipse season, a period, roughly every six months, when eclipses occur. Only two (or occasionally three) eclipse seasons occur each year, and each season lasts about 35 days and repeats just short of six months (173 days) later; thus two full eclipse seasons always occur each year. Either two or three eclipses happen each eclipse season. In the sequence below, each eclipse is separated by a fortnight.

Eclipse season of September–October 1978
September 16 Descending node (full moon)	October 2 Ascending node (new moon)
Total lunar eclipse Lunar Saros 127	Partial solar eclipse Solar Saros 153

== Related eclipses ==
=== Eclipses in 1978 ===
- A total lunar eclipse on March 24.
- A partial solar eclipse on April 7.
- A total lunar eclipse on September 16.
- A partial solar eclipse on October 2.

=== Metonic ===
- Preceded by: Solar eclipse of December 13, 1974
- Followed by: Solar eclipse of July 20, 1982

=== Tzolkinex ===
- Preceded by: Solar eclipse of August 20, 1971
- Followed by: Solar eclipse of November 12, 1985

=== Half-Saros ===
- Preceded by: Lunar eclipse of September 25, 1969
- Followed by: Lunar eclipse of October 7, 1987

=== Tritos ===
- Preceded by: Solar eclipse of November 2, 1967
- Followed by: Solar eclipse of August 31, 1989

=== Solar Saros 153 ===
- Preceded by: Solar eclipse of September 20, 1960
- Followed by: Solar eclipse of October 12, 1996

=== Inex ===
- Preceded by: Solar eclipse of October 21, 1949
- Followed by: Solar eclipse of September 11, 2007

=== Triad ===
- Preceded by: Solar eclipse of December 1, 1891
- Followed by: Solar eclipse of August 2, 2065

=== Solar eclipses of 1975–1978 ===
This eclipse is a member of a semester series. An eclipse in a semester series of solar eclipses repeats approximately every 177 days and 4 hours (a semester) at alternating nodes of the Moon's orbit.

Solar eclipse series sets from 1975 to 1978
Descending node			Ascending node		
Saros	Map	Gamma	Saros	Map	Gamma
118	May 11, 1975 Partial	1.0647	123	November 3, 1975 Partial	−1.0248
128	April 29, 1976 Annular	0.3378	133	October 23, 1976 Total	−0.327
138	April 18, 1977 Annular	−0.399	143	October 12, 1977 Total	0.3836
148	April 7, 1978 Partial	−1.1081	153	October 2, 1978 Partial	1.1616

=== Saros 153 ===
This eclipse is a part of Saros series 153, repeating every 18 years, 11 days, and containing 70 events. The series started with a partial solar eclipse on July 28, 1870. It contains annular eclipses from December 17, 2104 through May 26, 2970. There are no hybrid or total eclipses in this set. The series ends at member 70 as a partial eclipse on August 22, 3114. Its eclipses are tabulated in three columns; every third eclipse in the same column is one exeligmos apart, so they all cast shadows over approximately the same parts of the Earth.

The longest duration of annularity will be produced by member 38 at 7 minutes, 1 seconds on September 5, 2537. All eclipses in this series occur at the Moon’s ascending node of orbit.

Series members 1–19 occur between 1870 and 2200:
1	2	3
July 28, 1870	August 7, 1888	August 20, 1906
4	5	6
August 30, 1924	September 10, 1942	September 20, 1960
7	8	9
October 2, 1978	October 12, 1996	October 23, 2014
10	11	12
November 3, 2032	November 14, 2050	November 24, 2068
13	14	15
December 6, 2086	December 17, 2104	December 28, 2122
16	17	18
January 8, 2141	January 19, 2159	January 29, 2177
19
February 10, 2195

=== Metonic series ===
The metonic series repeats eclipses every 19 years (6939.69 days), lasting about 5 cycles. Eclipses occur in nearly the same calendar date. In addition, the octon subseries repeats 1/5 of that or every 3.8 years (1387.94 days). All eclipses in this table occur at the Moon's ascending node.

22 eclipse events between December 13, 1898 and July 20, 1982
December 13–14	October 1–2	July 20–21	May 9	February 24–25
111	113	115	117	119
December 13, 1898		July 21, 1906	May 9, 1910	February 25, 1914
121	123	125	127	129
December 14, 1917	October 1, 1921	July 20, 1925	May 9, 1929	February 24, 1933
131	133	135	137	139
December 13, 1936	October 1, 1940	July 20, 1944	May 9, 1948	February 25, 1952
141	143	145	147	149
December 14, 1955	October 2, 1959	July 20, 1963	May 9, 1967	February 25, 1971
151	153	155		
December 13, 1974	October 2, 1978	July 20, 1982		

=== Tritos series ===
This eclipse is a part of a tritos cycle, repeating at alternating nodes every 135 synodic months (≈ 3986.63 days, or 11 years minus 1 month). Their appearance and longitude are irregular due to a lack of synchronization with the anomalistic month (period of perigee), but groupings of 3 tritos cycles (≈ 33 years minus 3 months) come close (≈ 434.044 anomalistic months), so eclipses are similar in these groupings.

The partial solar eclipse on October 24, 2098 (part of Saros 164) is also a part of this series but is not included in the table below.

Series members between 1801 and 2011
February 11, 1804 (Saros 137)	January 10, 1815 (Saros 138)	December 9, 1825 (Saros 139)	November 9, 1836 (Saros 140)	October 9, 1847 (Saros 141)
September 7, 1858 (Saros 142)	August 7, 1869 (Saros 143)	July 7, 1880 (Saros 144)	June 6, 1891 (Saros 145)	May 7, 1902 (Saros 146)
April 6, 1913 (Saros 147)	March 5, 1924 (Saros 148)	February 3, 1935 (Saros 149)	January 3, 1946 (Saros 150)	December 2, 1956 (Saros 151)
November 2, 1967 (Saros 152)	October 2, 1978 (Saros 153)	August 31, 1989 (Saros 154)	July 31, 2000 (Saros 155)	July 1, 2011 (Saros 156)

=== Inex series ===
This eclipse is a part of the long period inex cycle, repeating at alternating nodes, every 358 synodic months (≈ 10,571.95 days, or 29 years minus 20 days). Their appearance and longitude are irregular due to a lack of synchronization with the anomalistic month (period of perigee). However, groupings of 3 inex cycles (≈ 87 years minus 2 months) comes close (≈ 1,151.02 anomalistic months), so eclipses are similar in these groupings.

Series members between 1801 and 2200
January 30, 1805 (Saros 147)	January 9, 1834 (Saros 148)	December 21, 1862 (Saros 149)
December 1, 1891 (Saros 150)	November 10, 1920 (Saros 151)	October 21, 1949 (Saros 152)
October 2, 1978 (Saros 153)	September 11, 2007 (Saros 154)	August 21, 2036 (Saros 155)
August 2, 2065 (Saros 156)	July 12, 2094 (Saros 157)	June 23, 2123 (Saros 158)
June 3, 2152 (Saros 159)	May 13, 2181 (Saros 160)	
