= Solar eclipse of December 22, 1889 =

Total eclipse

- Total eclipse
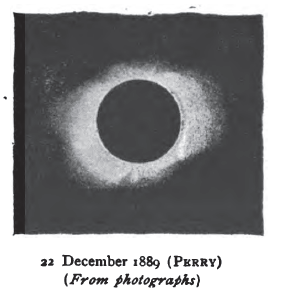
- The 1889 solar eclipse was the last to be photographed by Stephen Joseph Perry.

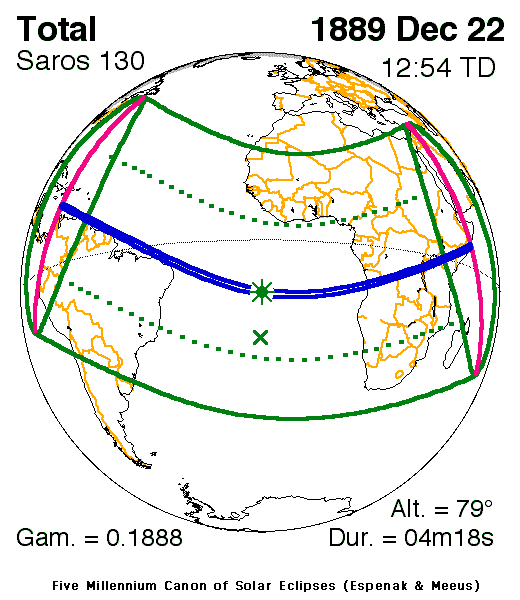
- Map
- Gamma: 0.1888
- Magnitude: 1.0449

Maximum eclipse
- Duration: 258 s (4 min 18 s)
- Coordinates: 12.7°S 12.8°W
- Max. width of band: 152 km (94 mi)

Times (UTC)
- Greatest eclipse: 12:54:15

References
- Saros: 130 (45 of 73)
- Catalog # (SE5000): 9257

A total solar eclipse occurred at the Moon's descending node of orbit on Sunday, December 22, 1889, with a magnitude of 1.0449. A solar eclipse occurs when the Moon passes between Earth and the Sun, thereby totally or partly obscuring the image of the Sun for a viewer on Earth. A total solar eclipse occurs when the Moon's apparent diameter is larger than the Sun's, blocking all direct sunlight, turning day into darkness. Totality occurs in a narrow path across Earth's surface, with the partial solar eclipse visible over a surrounding region thousands of kilometres wide. Occurring about 12.5 hours before perigee (on December 23, 1889, at 1:30 UTC), the Moon's apparent diameter was larger.

The path of totality was visible from parts of modern-day Trinidad and Tobago, northern French Guiana, Angola, the Democratic Republic of the Congo, Rwanda, Burundi, Tanzania, Kenya, and Somalia. A partial solar eclipse was also visible for parts of the eastern Caribbean, northern and central South America, and Africa.

The eclipse was the focus of a 242-day United States scientific expedition, roughly 70 miles south of Luanda.

== Observations ==
The eclipse was the focus of a scientific expedition from the United States, led by David P. Todd of Amherst College and including a team of at least six. Among the members was E. J. Loomis from the American Ephemeris and Nautical Almanac office. It set sail October 16 on the USS Pensacola and set up the eclipse base camp in December, roughly 70 miles south of Luanda in Cape Ledo. Totality was completely obscured by cloud cover. The ship returned to New York after 242 days, with the expedition performing a variety of other scientific studies along the way.

== Eclipse details ==
Shown below are two tables displaying details about this particular solar eclipse. The first table outlines times at which the Moon's penumbra or umbra attains the specific parameter, and the second table describes various other parameters pertaining to this eclipse.

December 22, 1889 Solar Eclipse Times
Event	Time (UTC)
First Penumbral External Contact	1889 December 22 at 10:16:37.8 UTC
First Umbral External Contact	1889 December 22 at 11:12:11.2 UTC
First Central Line	1889 December 22 at 11:12:55.8 UTC
First Umbral Internal Contact	1889 December 22 at 11:13:40.4 UTC
First Penumbral Internal Contact	1889 December 22 at 12:10:55.7 UTC
Ecliptic Conjunction	1889 December 22 at 12:52:18.2 UTC
Equatorial Conjunction	1889 December 22 at 12:52:26.5 UTC
Greatest Eclipse	1889 December 22 at 12:54:14.4 UTC
Greatest Duration	1889 December 22 at 12:56:22.0 UTC
Last Penumbral Internal Contact	1889 December 22 at 13:37:36.0 UTC
Last Umbral Internal Contact	1889 December 22 at 14:34:48.8 UTC
Last Central Line	1889 December 22 at 14:35:34.0 UTC
Last Umbral External Contact	1889 December 22 at 14:36:19.3 UTC
Last Penumbral External Contact	1889 December 22 at 15:31:50.3 UTC

December 22, 1889 Solar Eclipse Parameters
Parameter	Value
Eclipse Magnitude	1.04489
Eclipse Obscuration	1.09179
Gamma	0.18881
Sun Right Ascension	18h04m04.9s
Sun Declination	-23°26'59.9"
Sun Semi-Diameter	16'15.7"
Sun Equatorial Horizontal Parallax	08.9"
Moon Right Ascension	18h04m09.5s
Moon Declination	-23°15'29.9"
Moon Semi-Diameter	16'42.5"
Moon Equatorial Horizontal Parallax	1°01'19.2"
ΔT	-6.2 s

== Eclipse season ==
This eclipse is part of an eclipse season, a period, roughly every six months, when eclipses occur. Only two (or occasionally three) eclipse seasons occur each year, and each season lasts about 35 days and repeats just short of six months (173 days) later; thus two full eclipse seasons always occur each year. Either two or three eclipses happen each eclipse season. In the sequence below, each eclipse is separated by a fortnight.

Eclipse season of December 1889–January 1890
December 22 Descending node (new moon)	January 6 Ascending node (full moon)
Total solar eclipse Solar Saros 130	Penumbral lunar eclipse Lunar Saros 142

== Related eclipses ==
=== Eclipses in 1889 ===
- A total solar eclipse on January 1.
- A partial lunar eclipse on January 17.
- An annular solar eclipse on June 28.
- A partial lunar eclipse on July 12.
- A total solar eclipse on December 22.

=== Metonic ===
- Preceded by: Solar eclipse of March 5, 1886
- Followed by: Solar eclipse of October 9, 1893

=== Tzolkinex ===
- Preceded by: Solar eclipse of November 10, 1882
- Followed by: Solar eclipse of February 1, 1897

=== Half-Saros ===
- Preceded by: Lunar eclipse of December 16, 1880
- Followed by: Lunar eclipse of December 27, 1898

=== Tritos ===
- Preceded by: Solar eclipse of January 22, 1879
- Followed by: Solar eclipse of November 22, 1900

=== Solar Saros 130 ===
- Preceded by: Solar eclipse of December 12, 1871
- Followed by: Solar eclipse of January 3, 1908

=== Inex ===
- Preceded by: Solar eclipse of January 11, 1861
- Followed by: Solar eclipse of December 3, 1918

=== Triad ===
- Preceded by: Solar eclipse of February 21, 1803
- Followed by: Solar eclipse of October 23, 1976

=== Solar eclipses of 1888–1891 ===
This eclipse is a member of a semester series. An eclipse in a semester series of solar eclipses repeats approximately every 177 days and 4 hours (a semester) at alternating nodes of the Moon's orbit.

The partial solar eclipses on February 11, 1888 and August 7, 1888 occur in the previous lunar year eclipse set.

Solar eclipse series sets from 1888 to 1891
Ascending node			Descending node		
Saros	Map	Gamma	Saros	Map	Gamma
115	July 9, 1888 Partial	−1.2797	120	January 1, 1889 Total	0.8603
125	June 28, 1889 Annular	−0.5431	130	December 22, 1889 Total	0.1888
135	June 17, 1890 Annular	0.2246	140	December 12, 1890 Hybrid	−0.5016
145	June 6, 1891 Annular	0.9754	150	December 1, 1891 Partial	−1.2515

=== Saros 130 ===
This eclipse is a part of Saros series 130, repeating every 18 years, 11 days, and containing 73 events. The series started with a partial solar eclipse on August 20, 1096. It contains total eclipses from April 5, 1475 through July 18, 2232. There are no annular or hybrid eclipses in this set. The series ends at member 73 as a partial eclipse on October 25, 2394. Its eclipses are tabulated in three columns; every third eclipse in the same column is one exeligmos apart, so they all cast shadows over approximately the same parts of the Earth.

The longest duration of totality was produced by member 30 at 6 minutes, 41 seconds on July 11, 1619. All eclipses in this series occur at the Moon’s descending node of orbit.

Series members 41–62 occur between 1801 and 2200:
41	42	43
November 9, 1817	November 20, 1835	November 30, 1853
44	45	46
December 12, 1871	December 22, 1889	January 3, 1908
47	48	49
January 14, 1926	January 25, 1944	February 5, 1962
50	51	52
February 16, 1980	February 26, 1998	March 9, 2016
53	54	55
March 20, 2034	March 30, 2052	April 11, 2070
56	57	58
April 21, 2088	May 3, 2106	May 14, 2124
59	60	61
May 25, 2142	June 4, 2160	June 16, 2178
62
June 26, 2196

=== Metonic series ===
The metonic series repeats eclipses every 19 years (6939.69 days), lasting about 5 cycles. Eclipses occur in nearly the same calendar date. In addition, the octon subseries repeats 1/5 of that or every 3.8 years (1387.94 days). All eclipses in this table occur at the Moon's descending node.

22 eclipse events between March 5, 1848 and July 30, 1935
March 5–6	December 22–24	October 9–11	July 29–30	May 17–18
108	110	112	114	116
March 5, 1848			July 29, 1859	May 17, 1863
118	120	122	124	126
March 6, 1867	December 22, 1870	October 10, 1874	July 29, 1878	May 17, 1882
128	130	132	134	136
March 5, 1886	December 22, 1889	October 9, 1893	July 29, 1897	May 18, 1901
138	140	142	144	146
March 6, 1905	December 23, 1908	October 10, 1912	July 30, 1916	May 18, 1920
148	150	152	154	
March 5, 1924	December 24, 1927	October 11, 1931	July 30, 1935	

=== Tritos series ===
This eclipse is a part of a tritos cycle, repeating at alternating nodes every 135 synodic months (≈ 3986.63 days, or 11 years minus 1 month). Their appearance and longitude are irregular due to a lack of synchronization with the anomalistic month (period of perigee), but groupings of 3 tritos cycles (≈ 33 years minus 3 months) come close (≈ 434.044 anomalistic months), so eclipses are similar in these groupings.

Series members between 1801 and 2200
August 28, 1802 (Saros 122)	July 27, 1813 (Saros 123)	June 26, 1824 (Saros 124)	May 27, 1835 (Saros 125)	April 25, 1846 (Saros 126)
March 25, 1857 (Saros 127)	February 23, 1868 (Saros 128)	January 22, 1879 (Saros 129)	December 22, 1889 (Saros 130)	November 22, 1900 (Saros 131)
October 22, 1911 (Saros 132)	September 21, 1922 (Saros 133)	August 21, 1933 (Saros 134)	July 20, 1944 (Saros 135)	June 20, 1955 (Saros 136)
May 20, 1966 (Saros 137)	April 18, 1977 (Saros 138)	March 18, 1988 (Saros 139)	February 16, 1999 (Saros 140)	January 15, 2010 (Saros 141)
December 14, 2020 (Saros 142)	November 14, 2031 (Saros 143)	October 14, 2042 (Saros 144)	September 12, 2053 (Saros 145)	August 12, 2064 (Saros 146)
July 13, 2075 (Saros 147)	June 11, 2086 (Saros 148)	May 11, 2097 (Saros 149)	April 11, 2108 (Saros 150)	March 11, 2119 (Saros 151)
February 8, 2130 (Saros 152)	January 8, 2141 (Saros 153)	December 8, 2151 (Saros 154)	November 7, 2162 (Saros 155)	October 7, 2173 (Saros 156)
September 4, 2184 (Saros 157)	August 5, 2195 (Saros 158)			

=== Inex series ===
This eclipse is a part of the long period inex cycle, repeating at alternating nodes, every 358 synodic months (≈ 10,571.95 days, or 29 years minus 20 days). Their appearance and longitude are irregular due to a lack of synchronization with the anomalistic month (period of perigee). However, groupings of 3 inex cycles (≈ 87 years minus 2 months) comes close (≈ 1,151.02 anomalistic months), so eclipses are similar in these groupings.

Series members between 1801 and 2200
February 21, 1803 (Saros 127)	February 1, 1832 (Saros 128)	January 11, 1861 (Saros 129)
December 22, 1889 (Saros 130)	December 3, 1918 (Saros 131)	November 12, 1947 (Saros 132)
October 23, 1976 (Saros 133)	October 3, 2005 (Saros 134)	September 12, 2034 (Saros 135)
August 24, 2063 (Saros 136)	August 3, 2092 (Saros 137)	July 14, 2121 (Saros 138)
June 25, 2150 (Saros 139)	June 5, 2179 (Saros 140)	
