= Solar eclipse of March 6, 1905 =

20th-century annular solar eclipse

- Annular eclipse
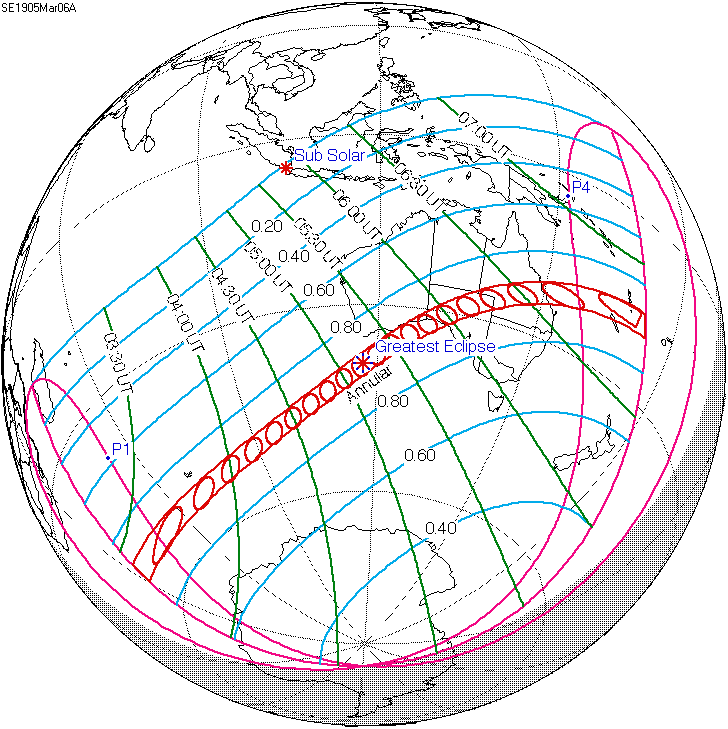
- Map
- Gamma: −0.5768
- Magnitude: 0.9269

Maximum eclipse
- Duration: 478 s (7 min 58 s)
- Coordinates: 39.5°S 117.4°E
- Max. width of band: 334 km (208 mi)

Times (UTC)
- Greatest eclipse: 5:12:26

References
- Saros: 138 (25 of 70)
- Catalog # (SE5000): 9292

An annular solar eclipse occurred at the Moon's descending node of orbit on Monday, March 6, 1905, with a magnitude of 0.9269. A solar eclipse occurs when the Moon passes between Earth and the Sun, thereby totally or partly obscuring the image of the Sun for a viewer on Earth. An annular solar eclipse occurs when the Moon's apparent diameter is smaller than the Sun's, blocking most of the Sun's light and causing the Sun to look like an annulus (ring). An annular eclipse appears as a partial eclipse over a region of the Earth thousands of kilometres wide. Occurring about 2.1 days before apogee (on March 8, 1905, at 7:00 UTC), the Moon's apparent diameter was smaller.

Annularity was visible from Heard Island and McDonald Islands (now an Australian external territory), Australia, New Caledonia, and New Hebrides (now Vanuatu). A partial eclipse was visible for parts of Madagascar, Antarctica, Australia, and Oceania.

== Eclipse details ==
Shown below are two tables displaying details about this particular solar eclipse. The first table outlines times at which the Moon's penumbra or umbra attains the specific parameter, and the second table describes various other parameters pertaining to this eclipse.

March 6, 1905 Solar Eclipse Times
Event	Time (UTC)
First Penumbral External Contact	1905 March 6 at 02:19:16.2 UTC
First Umbral External Contact	1905 March 6 at 03:32:13.3 UTC
First Central Line	1905 March 6 at 03:35:52.7 UTC
First Umbral Internal Contact	1905 March 6 at 03:39:35.1 UTC
Equatorial Conjunction	1905 March 6 at 04:51:33.7 UTC
Greatest Duration	1905 March 6 at 05:10:13.7 UTC
Greatest Eclipse	1905 March 6 at 05:12:25.7 UTC
Ecliptic Conjunction	1905 March 6 at 05:19:19.8 UTC
Last Umbral Internal Contact	1905 March 6 at 06:45:31.2 UTC
Last Central Line	1905 March 6 at 06:49:14.2 UTC
Last Umbral External Contact	1905 March 6 at 06:52:54.4 UTC
Last Penumbral External Contact	1905 March 6 at 08:05:47.3 UTC

March 6, 1905 Solar Eclipse Parameters
Parameter	Value
Eclipse Magnitude	0.92691
Eclipse Obscuration	0.85916
Gamma	−0.57684
Sun Right Ascension	23h04m40.3s
Sun Declination	-05°55'14.1"
Sun Semi-Diameter	16'07.0"
Sun Equatorial Horizontal Parallax	08.9"
Moon Right Ascension	23h05m16.9s
Moon Declination	-06°25'02.0"
Moon Semi-Diameter	14'45.4"
Moon Equatorial Horizontal Parallax	0°54'09.6"
ΔT	4.1 s

== Eclipse season ==
This eclipse is part of an eclipse season, a period, roughly every six months, when eclipses occur. Only two (or occasionally three) eclipse seasons occur each year, and each season lasts about 35 days and repeats just short of six months (173 days) later; thus two full eclipse seasons always occur each year. Either two or three eclipses happen each eclipse season. In the sequence below, each eclipse is separated by a fortnight.

Eclipse season of February–March 1905
February 19 Ascending node (full moon)	March 6 Descending node (new moon)
Partial lunar eclipse Lunar Saros 112	Annular solar eclipse Solar Saros 138

== Related eclipses ==
=== Eclipses in 1905 ===
- A partial lunar eclipse on February 19.
- An annular solar eclipse on March 6.
- A partial lunar eclipse on August 15.
- A total solar eclipse on August 30.

=== Metonic ===
- Preceded by: Solar eclipse of May 18, 1901
- Followed by: Solar eclipse of December 23, 1908

=== Tzolkinex ===
- Preceded by: Solar eclipse of January 22, 1898
- Followed by: Solar eclipse of April 17, 1912

=== Half-Saros ===
- Preceded by: Lunar eclipse of February 28, 1896
- Followed by: Lunar eclipse of March 12, 1914

=== Tritos ===
- Preceded by: Solar eclipse of April 6, 1894
- Followed by: Solar eclipse of February 3, 1916

=== Solar Saros 138 ===
- Preceded by: Solar eclipse of February 22, 1887
- Followed by: Solar eclipse of March 17, 1923

=== Inex ===
- Preceded by: Solar eclipse of March 25, 1876
- Followed by: Solar eclipse of February 14, 1934

=== Triad ===
- Preceded by: Solar eclipse of May 5, 1818
- Followed by: Solar eclipse of January 4, 1992

=== Solar eclipses of 1902–1906 ===
This eclipse is a member of a semester series. An eclipse in a semester series of solar eclipses repeats approximately every 177 days and 4 hours (a semester) at alternating nodes of the Moon's orbit.

The partial solar eclipses on May 7, 1902 and October 31, 1902 occur in the previous lunar year eclipse set, and the partial solar eclipse on July 21, 1906 occurs in the next lunar year eclipse set.

Solar eclipse series sets from 1902 to 1906
Descending node			Ascending node		
Saros	Map	Gamma	Saros	Map	Gamma
108	April 8, 1902 Partial	1.5024	113	October 1, 1902	
118	March 29, 1903 Annular	0.8413	123	September 21, 1903 Total	−0.8967
128	March 17, 1904 Annular	0.1299	133	September 9, 1904 Total	−0.1625
138	March 6, 1905 Annular	−0.5768	143	August 30, 1905 Total	0.5708
148	February 23, 1906 Partial	−1.2479	153	August 20, 1906 Partial	1.3731

=== Saros 138 ===
This eclipse is a part of Saros series 138, repeating every 18 years, 11 days, and containing 70 events. The series started with a partial solar eclipse on June 6, 1472. It contains annular eclipses from August 31, 1598 through February 18, 2482; a hybrid eclipse on March 1, 2500; and total eclipses from March 12, 2518 through April 3, 2554. The series ends at member 70 as a partial eclipse on July 11, 2716. Its eclipses are tabulated in three columns; every third eclipse in the same column is one exeligmos apart, so they all cast shadows over approximately the same parts of the Earth.

The longest duration of annularity was produced by member 23 at 8 minutes, 2 seconds on February 11, 1869, and the longest duration of totality will be produced by member 61 at 56 seconds on April 3, 2554. All eclipses in this series occur at the Moon’s descending node of orbit.

Series members 20–41 occur between 1801 and 2200:
20	21	22
January 10, 1815	January 20, 1833	February 1, 1851
23	24	25
February 11, 1869	February 22, 1887	March 6, 1905
26	27	28
March 17, 1923	March 27, 1941	April 8, 1959
29	30	31
April 18, 1977	April 29, 1995	May 10, 2013
32	33	34
May 21, 2031	May 31, 2049	June 11, 2067
35	36	37
June 22, 2085	July 4, 2103	July 14, 2121
38	39	40
July 25, 2139	August 5, 2157	August 16, 2175
41
August 26, 2193

=== Metonic series ===
The metonic series repeats eclipses every 19 years (6939.69 days), lasting about 5 cycles. Eclipses occur in nearly the same calendar date. In addition, the octon subseries repeats 1/5 of that or every 3.8 years (1387.94 days). All eclipses in this table occur at the Moon's descending node.

22 eclipse events between March 5, 1848 and July 30, 1935
March 5–6	December 22–24	October 9–11	July 29–30	May 17–18
108	110	112	114	116
March 5, 1848			July 29, 1859	May 17, 1863
118	120	122	124	126
March 6, 1867	December 22, 1870	October 10, 1874	July 29, 1878	May 17, 1882
128	130	132	134	136
March 5, 1886	December 22, 1889	October 9, 1893	July 29, 1897	May 18, 1901
138	140	142	144	146
March 6, 1905	December 23, 1908	October 10, 1912	July 30, 1916	May 18, 1920
148	150	152	154	
March 5, 1924	December 24, 1927	October 11, 1931	July 30, 1935	

=== Tritos series ===
This eclipse is a part of a tritos cycle, repeating at alternating nodes every 135 synodic months (≈ 3986.63 days, or 11 years minus 1 month). Their appearance and longitude are irregular due to a lack of synchronization with the anomalistic month (period of perigee), but groupings of 3 tritos cycles (≈ 33 years minus 3 months) come close (≈ 434.044 anomalistic months), so eclipses are similar in these groupings.

The partial solar eclipses on December 18, 2188 (part of Saros 164) and November 18, 2199 (part of Saros 165) are also a part of this series but are not included in the table below.

Series members between 1801 and 2134
December 10, 1806 (Saros 129)	November 9, 1817 (Saros 130)	October 9, 1828 (Saros 131)	September 7, 1839 (Saros 132)	August 7, 1850 (Saros 133)
July 8, 1861 (Saros 134)	June 6, 1872 (Saros 135)	May 6, 1883 (Saros 136)	April 6, 1894 (Saros 137)	March 6, 1905 (Saros 138)
February 3, 1916 (Saros 139)	January 3, 1927 (Saros 140)	December 2, 1937 (Saros 141)	November 1, 1948 (Saros 142)	October 2, 1959 (Saros 143)
August 31, 1970 (Saros 144)	July 31, 1981 (Saros 145)	June 30, 1992 (Saros 146)	May 31, 2003 (Saros 147)	April 29, 2014 (Saros 148)
March 29, 2025 (Saros 149)	February 27, 2036 (Saros 150)	January 26, 2047 (Saros 151)	December 26, 2057 (Saros 152)	November 24, 2068 (Saros 153)
October 24, 2079 (Saros 154)	September 23, 2090 (Saros 155)	August 24, 2101 (Saros 156)	July 23, 2112 (Saros 157)	June 23, 2123 (Saros 158)
May 23, 2134 (Saros 159)

=== Inex series ===
This eclipse is a part of the long period inex cycle, repeating at alternating nodes, every 358 synodic months (≈ 10,571.95 days, or 29 years minus 20 days). Their appearance and longitude are irregular due to a lack of synchronization with the anomalistic month (period of perigee). However, groupings of 3 inex cycles (≈ 87 years minus 2 months) comes close (≈ 1,151.02 anomalistic months), so eclipses are similar in these groupings.

Series members between 1801 and 2200
May 5, 1818 (Saros 135)	April 15, 1847 (Saros 136)	March 25, 1876 (Saros 137)
March 6, 1905 (Saros 138)	February 14, 1934 (Saros 139)	January 25, 1963 (Saros 140)
January 4, 1992 (Saros 141)	December 14, 2020 (Saros 142)	November 25, 2049 (Saros 143)
November 4, 2078 (Saros 144)	October 16, 2107 (Saros 145)	September 26, 2136 (Saros 146)
September 5, 2165 (Saros 147)	August 16, 2194 (Saros 148)	
