= Solar eclipse of August 20, 1906 =

20th-century partial solar eclipse

- Partial eclipse
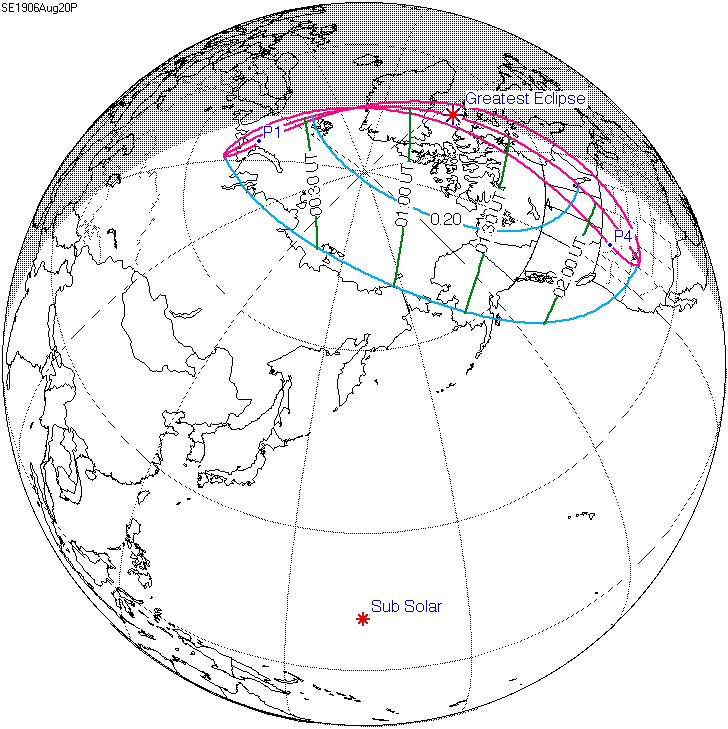
- Map
- Gamma: 1.3731
- Magnitude: 0.3147

Maximum eclipse
- Coordinates: 70.8°N 66.4°W

Times (UTC)
- Greatest eclipse: 1:12:50

References
- Saros: 153 (3 of 70)
- Catalog # (SE5000): 9295

A partial solar eclipse occurred at the Moon's ascending node of orbit between Sunday, August 19 and Monday, August 20, 1906, with a magnitude of 0.3147. A solar eclipse occurs when the Moon passes between Earth and the Sun, thereby totally or partly obscuring the image of the Sun for a viewer on Earth. A partial solar eclipse occurs in the polar regions of the Earth when the center of the Moon's shadow misses the Earth.

A partial eclipse was visible for parts of Northern Russia, Alaska, Western Canada, and the Pacific Northwest.

== Eclipse details ==
Shown below are two tables displaying details about this particular solar eclipse. The first table outlines times at which the Moon's penumbra or umbra attains the specific parameter, and the second table describes various other parameters pertaining to this eclipse.

August 20, 1906 Solar Eclipse Times
Event	Time (UTC)
First Penumbral External Contact	1906 August 19 at 23:53:11.5 UTC
Equatorial Conjunction	1906 August 20 at 00:33:41.7 UTC
Greatest Eclipse	1906 August 20 at 01:12:49.6 UTC
Ecliptic Conjunction	1906 August 20 at 01:27:22.8 UTC
Last Penumbral External Contact	1906 August 20 at 02:32:40.9 UTC

August 20, 1906 Solar Eclipse Parameters
Parameter	Value
Eclipse Magnitude	0.31473
Eclipse Obscuration	0.20068
Gamma	1.37306
Sun Right Ascension	09h53m24.2s
Sun Declination	+12°49'20.8"
Sun Semi-Diameter	15'48.5"
Sun Equatorial Horizontal Parallax	08.7"
Moon Right Ascension	09h54m44.1s
Moon Declination	+14°05'01.4"
Moon Semi-Diameter	15'32.6"
Moon Equatorial Horizontal Parallax	0°57'02.8"
ΔT	5.8 s

== Eclipse season ==
This eclipse is part of an eclipse season, a period, roughly every six months, when eclipses occur. Only two (or occasionally three) eclipse seasons occur each year, and each season lasts about 35 days and repeats just short of six months (173 days) later; thus two full eclipse seasons always occur each year. Either two or three eclipses happen each eclipse season. In the sequence below, each eclipse is separated by a fortnight. The first and last eclipse in this sequence is separated by one synodic month.

Eclipse season of July−August 1906
July 21 Ascending node (new moon)	August 4 Descending node (full moon)	August 20 Ascending node (new moon)
Partial solar eclipse Solar Saros 115	Total lunar eclipse Lunar Saros 127	Partial solar eclipse Solar Saros 153

== Related eclipses ==
=== Eclipses in 1906 ===
- A total lunar eclipse on February 9.
- A partial solar eclipse on February 23.
- A partial solar eclipse on July 21.
- A total lunar eclipse on August 4.
- A partial solar eclipse on August 20.

=== Metonic ===
- Preceded by: Solar eclipse of October 31, 1902

=== Tzolkinex ===
- Followed by: Solar eclipse of September 30, 1913

=== Half-Saros ===
- Preceded by: Lunar eclipse of August 12, 1897
- Followed by: Lunar eclipse of August 24, 1915

=== Tritos ===
- Preceded by: Solar eclipse of September 18, 1895
- Followed by: Solar eclipse of July 19, 1917

=== Solar Saros 153 ===
- Preceded by: Solar eclipse of August 7, 1888
- Followed by: Solar eclipse of August 30, 1924

=== Inex ===
- Preceded by: Solar eclipse of September 7, 1877
- Followed by: Solar eclipse of July 30, 1935

=== Triad ===
- Preceded by: Solar eclipse of October 19, 1819

=== Solar eclipses of 1902–1906 ===
This eclipse is a member of a semester series. An eclipse in a semester series of solar eclipses repeats approximately every 177 days and 4 hours (a semester) at alternating nodes of the Moon's orbit.

The partial solar eclipses on May 7, 1902 and October 31, 1902 occur in the previous lunar year eclipse set, and the partial solar eclipse on July 21, 1906 occurs in the next lunar year eclipse set.

Solar eclipse series sets from 1902 to 1906
Descending node			Ascending node		
Saros	Map	Gamma	Saros	Map	Gamma
108	April 8, 1902 Partial	1.5024	113	October 1, 1902	
118	March 29, 1903 Annular	0.8413	123	September 21, 1903 Total	−0.8967
128	March 17, 1904 Annular	0.1299	133	September 9, 1904 Total	−0.1625
138	March 6, 1905 Annular	−0.5768	143	August 30, 1905 Total	0.5708
148	February 23, 1906 Partial	−1.2479	153	August 20, 1906 Partial	1.3731

=== Saros 153 ===
This eclipse is a part of Saros series 153, repeating every 18 years, 11 days, and containing 70 events. The series started with a partial solar eclipse on July 28, 1870. It contains annular eclipses from December 17, 2104 through May 26, 2970. There are no hybrid or total eclipses in this set. The series ends at member 70 as a partial eclipse on August 22, 3114. Its eclipses are tabulated in three columns; every third eclipse in the same column is one exeligmos apart, so they all cast shadows over approximately the same parts of the Earth.

The longest duration of annularity will be produced by member 38 at 7 minutes, 1 seconds on September 5, 2537. All eclipses in this series occur at the Moon’s ascending node of orbit.

Series members 1–19 occur between 1870 and 2200:
1	2	3
July 28, 1870	August 7, 1888	August 20, 1906
4	5	6
August 30, 1924	September 10, 1942	September 20, 1960
7	8	9
October 2, 1978	October 12, 1996	October 23, 2014
10	11	12
November 3, 2032	November 14, 2050	November 24, 2068
13	14	15
December 6, 2086	December 17, 2104	December 28, 2122
16	17	18
January 8, 2141	January 19, 2159	January 29, 2177
19
February 10, 2195

=== Metonic series ===
The metonic series repeats eclipses every 19 years (6939.69 days), lasting about 5 cycles. Eclipses occur in nearly the same calendar date. In addition, the octon subseries repeats 1/5 of that or every 3.8 years (1387.94 days). All eclipses in this table occur at the Moon's ascending node.

24 eclipse events between March 25, 1819 and August 20, 1906
March 25–26	January 11–12	October 30–31	August 18–20	June 6–7
107	109	111	113	115
March 25, 1819	January 12, 1823	October 31, 1826	August 18, 1830	June 7, 1834
117	119	121	123	125
March 25, 1838	January 11, 1842	October 30, 1845	August 18, 1849	June 6, 1853
127	129	131	133	135
March 25, 1857	January 11, 1861	October 30, 1864	August 18, 1868	June 6, 1872
137	139	141	143	145
March 25, 1876	January 11, 1880	October 30, 1883	August 19, 1887	June 6, 1891
147	149	151	153	
March 26, 1895	January 11, 1899	October 31, 1902	August 20, 1906	

=== Tritos series ===
This eclipse is a part of a tritos cycle, repeating at alternating nodes every 135 synodic months (≈ 3986.63 days, or 11 years minus 1 month). Their appearance and longitude are irregular due to a lack of synchronization with the anomalistic month (period of perigee), but groupings of 3 tritos cycles (≈ 33 years minus 3 months) come close (≈ 434.044 anomalistic months), so eclipses are similar in these groupings.

Series members between 1801 and 1928
May 25, 1808 (Saros 144)	April 24, 1819 (Saros 145)	March 24, 1830 (Saros 146)	February 21, 1841 (Saros 147)	January 21, 1852 (Saros 148)
December 21, 1862 (Saros 149)	November 20, 1873 (Saros 150)	October 19, 1884 (Saros 151)	September 18, 1895 (Saros 152)	August 20, 1906 (Saros 153)
July 19, 1917 (Saros 154)	June 17, 1928 (Saros 155)			

=== Inex series ===
This eclipse is a part of the long period inex cycle, repeating at alternating nodes, every 358 synodic months (≈ 10,571.95 days, or 29 years minus 20 days). Their appearance and longitude are irregular due to a lack of synchronization with the anomalistic month (period of perigee). However, groupings of 3 inex cycles (≈ 87 years minus 2 months) comes close (≈ 1,151.02 anomalistic months), so eclipses are similar in these groupings.

Series members between 1801 and 1964
October 19, 1819 (Saros 150)	September 27, 1848 (Saros 151)	September 7, 1877 (Saros 152)
August 20, 1906 (Saros 153)	July 30, 1935 (Saros 154)	July 9, 1964 (Saros 155)
