= Solar eclipse of February 23, 1906 =

20th-century partial solar eclipse

- Partial eclipse
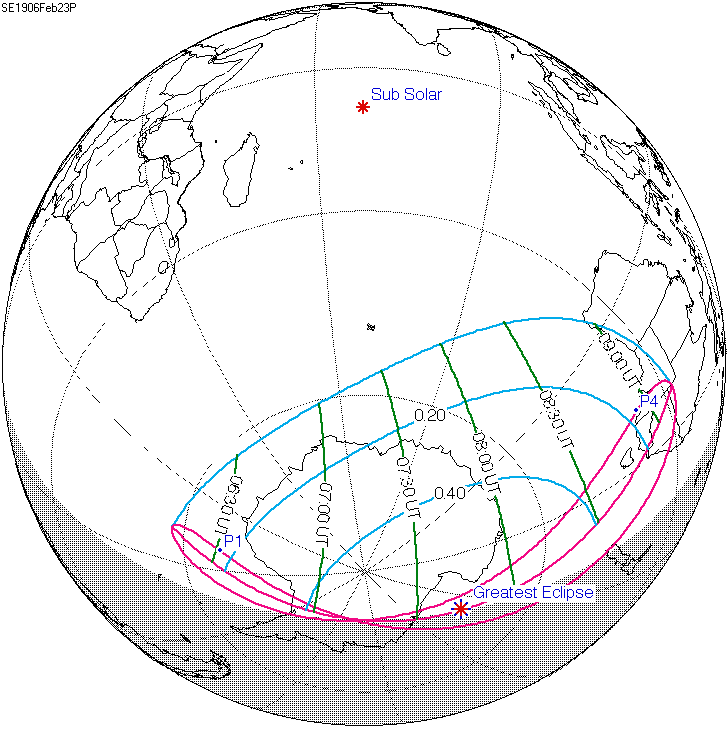
- Map
- Gamma: −1.2479
- Magnitude: 0.5386

Maximum eclipse
- Coordinates: 71.4°S 170.3°W

Times (UTC)
- Greatest eclipse: 7:43:20

References
- Saros: 148 (15 of 75)
- Catalog # (SE5000): 9294

A partial solar eclipse occurred at the Moon's descending node of orbit on Friday, February 23, 1906, with a magnitude of 0.5386. A solar eclipse occurs when the Moon passes between Earth and the Sun, thereby totally or partly obscuring the image of the Sun for a viewer on Earth. A partial solar eclipse occurs in the polar regions of the Earth when the center of the Moon's shadow misses the Earth.

A partial eclipse was visible for parts of Antarctica and Southern Australia.

== Eclipse details ==
Shown below are two tables displaying details about this particular solar eclipse. The first table outlines times at which the Moon's penumbra or umbra attains the specific parameter, and the second table describes various other parameters pertaining to this eclipse.

February 23, 1906 Solar Eclipse Times
Event	Time (UTC)
First Penumbral External Contact	1906 February 23 at 05:57:45.1 UTC
Equatorial Conjunction	1906 February 23 at 07:03:47.6 UTC
Greatest Eclipse	1906 February 23 at 07:43:20.4 UTC
Ecliptic Conjunction	1906 February 23 at 07:57:15.8 UTC
Last Penumbral External Contact	1906 February 23 at 09:29:19.3 UTC

February 23, 1906 Solar Eclipse Parameters
Parameter	Value
Eclipse Magnitude	0.53864
Eclipse Obscuration	0.42720
Gamma	−1.24788
Sun Right Ascension	22h22m48.6s
Sun Declination	-10°07'11.2"
Sun Semi-Diameter	16'09.6"
Sun Equatorial Horizontal Parallax	08.9"
Moon Right Ascension	22h24m05.7s
Moon Declination	-11°14'43.4"
Moon Semi-Diameter	15'21.4"
Moon Equatorial Horizontal Parallax	0°56'21.5"
ΔT	5.4 s

== Eclipse season ==
This eclipse is part of an eclipse season, a period, roughly every six months, when eclipses occur. Only two (or occasionally three) eclipse seasons occur each year, and each season lasts about 35 days and repeats just short of six months (173 days) later; thus two full eclipse seasons always occur each year. Either two or three eclipses happen each eclipse season. In the sequence below, each eclipse is separated by a fortnight.

Eclipse season of February 1906
February 9 Ascending node (full moon)	February 23 Descending node (new moon)
Total lunar eclipse Lunar Saros 122	Partial solar eclipse Solar Saros 148

== Related eclipses ==
=== Eclipses in 1906 ===
- A total lunar eclipse on February 9.
- A partial solar eclipse on February 23.
- A partial solar eclipse on July 21.
- A total lunar eclipse on August 4.
- A partial solar eclipse on August 20.

=== Metonic ===
- Preceded by: Solar eclipse of May 7, 1902
- Followed by: Solar eclipse of December 12, 1909

=== Tzolkinex ===
- Preceded by: Solar eclipse of January 11, 1899
- Followed by: Solar eclipse of April 6, 1913

=== Half-Saros ===
- Preceded by: Lunar eclipse of February 17, 1897
- Followed by: Lunar eclipse of March 1, 1915

=== Tritos ===
- Preceded by: Solar eclipse of March 26, 1895
- Followed by: Solar eclipse of January 23, 1917

=== Solar Saros 148 ===
- Preceded by: Solar eclipse of February 11, 1888
- Followed by: Solar eclipse of March 5, 1924

=== Inex ===
- Preceded by: Solar eclipse of March 15, 1877
- Followed by: Solar eclipse of February 3, 1935

=== Triad ===
- Preceded by: Solar eclipse of April 24, 1819
- Followed by: Solar eclipse of December 24, 1992

=== Solar eclipses of 1902–1906 ===
This eclipse is a member of a semester series. An eclipse in a semester series of solar eclipses repeats approximately every 177 days and 4 hours (a semester) at alternating nodes of the Moon's orbit.

The partial solar eclipses on May 7, 1902 and October 31, 1902 occur in the previous lunar year eclipse set, and the partial solar eclipse on July 21, 1906 occurs in the next lunar year eclipse set.

Solar eclipse series sets from 1902 to 1906
Descending node			Ascending node		
Saros	Map	Gamma	Saros	Map	Gamma
108	April 8, 1902 Partial	1.5024	113	October 1, 1902	
118	March 29, 1903 Annular	0.8413	123	September 21, 1903 Total	−0.8967
128	March 17, 1904 Annular	0.1299	133	September 9, 1904 Total	−0.1625
138	March 6, 1905 Annular	−0.5768	143	August 30, 1905 Total	0.5708
148	February 23, 1906 Partial	−1.2479	153	August 20, 1906 Partial	1.3731

=== Saros 148 ===
This eclipse is a part of Saros series 148, repeating every 18 years, 11 days, and containing 75 events. The series started with a partial solar eclipse on September 21, 1653. It contains annular eclipses on April 29, 2014 and May 9, 2032; a hybrid eclipse on May 20, 2050; and total eclipses from May 31, 2068 through August 3, 2771. The series ends at member 75 as a partial eclipse on December 12, 2987. Its eclipses are tabulated in three columns; every third eclipse in the same column is one exeligmos apart, so they all cast shadows over approximately the same parts of the Earth.

The longest duration of annularity will be produced by member 22 at 22 seconds (by default) on May 9, 2032, and the longest duration of totality will be produced by member 54 at 5 minutes, 23 seconds on April 26, 2609. All eclipses in this series occur at the Moon’s descending node of orbit.

Series members 10–31 occur between 1801 and 2200:
10	11	12
December 30, 1815	January 9, 1834	January 21, 1852
13	14	15
January 31, 1870	February 11, 1888	February 23, 1906
16	17	18
March 5, 1924	March 16, 1942	March 27, 1960
19	20	21
April 7, 1978	April 17, 1996	April 29, 2014
22	23	24
May 9, 2032	May 20, 2050	May 31, 2068
25	26	27
June 11, 2086	June 22, 2104	July 4, 2122
28	29	30
July 14, 2140	July 25, 2158	August 4, 2176
31
August 16, 2194

=== Metonic series ===
The metonic series repeats eclipses every 19 years (6939.69 days), lasting about 5 cycles. Eclipses occur in nearly the same calendar date. In addition, the octon subseries repeats 1/5 of that or every 3.8 years (1387.94 days). All eclipses in this table occur at the Moon's descending node.

22 eclipse events between February 23, 1830 and July 19, 1917
February 22–23	December 11–12	September 29–30	July 18–19	May 6–7
108	110	112	114	116
February 23, 1830			July 18, 1841	May 6, 1845
118	120	122	124	126
February 23, 1849	December 11, 1852	September 29, 1856	July 18, 1860	May 6, 1864
128	130	132	134	136
February 23, 1868	December 12, 1871	September 29, 1875	July 19, 1879	May 6, 1883
138	140	142	144	146
February 22, 1887	December 12, 1890	September 29, 1894	July 18, 1898	May 7, 1902
148	150	152	154	
February 23, 1906	December 12, 1909	September 30, 1913	July 19, 1917	

=== Tritos series ===
This eclipse is a part of a tritos cycle, repeating at alternating nodes every 135 synodic months (≈ 3986.63 days, or 11 years minus 1 month). Their appearance and longitude are irregular due to a lack of synchronization with the anomalistic month (period of perigee), but groupings of 3 tritos cycles (≈ 33 years minus 3 months) come close (≈ 434.044 anomalistic months), so eclipses are similar in these groupings.

Series members between 1801 and 1982
November 29, 1807 (Saros 139)	October 29, 1818 (Saros 140)	September 28, 1829 (Saros 141)	August 27, 1840 (Saros 142)	July 28, 1851 (Saros 143)
June 27, 1862 (Saros 144)	May 26, 1873 (Saros 145)	April 25, 1884 (Saros 146)	March 26, 1895 (Saros 147)	February 23, 1906 (Saros 148)
January 23, 1917 (Saros 149)	December 24, 1927 (Saros 150)	November 21, 1938 (Saros 151)	October 21, 1949 (Saros 152)	September 20, 1960 (Saros 153)
August 20, 1971 (Saros 154)	July 20, 1982 (Saros 155)			

=== Inex series ===
This eclipse is a part of the long period inex cycle, repeating at alternating nodes, every 358 synodic months (≈ 10,571.95 days, or 29 years minus 20 days). Their appearance and longitude are irregular due to a lack of synchronization with the anomalistic month (period of perigee). However, groupings of 3 inex cycles (≈ 87 years minus 2 months) comes close (≈ 1,151.02 anomalistic months), so eclipses are similar in these groupings.

Series members between 1801 and 2200
April 24, 1819 (Saros 145)	April 3, 1848 (Saros 146)	March 15, 1877 (Saros 147)
February 23, 1906 (Saros 148)	February 3, 1935 (Saros 149)	January 14, 1964 (Saros 150)
December 24, 1992 (Saros 151)	December 4, 2021 (Saros 152)	November 14, 2050 (Saros 153)
October 24, 2079 (Saros 154)	October 5, 2108 (Saros 155)	September 15, 2137 (Saros 156)
August 25, 2166 (Saros 157)	August 5, 2195 (Saros 158)	
