= Solar eclipse of April 8, 1902 =

20th-century partial solar eclipse

- Partial eclipse
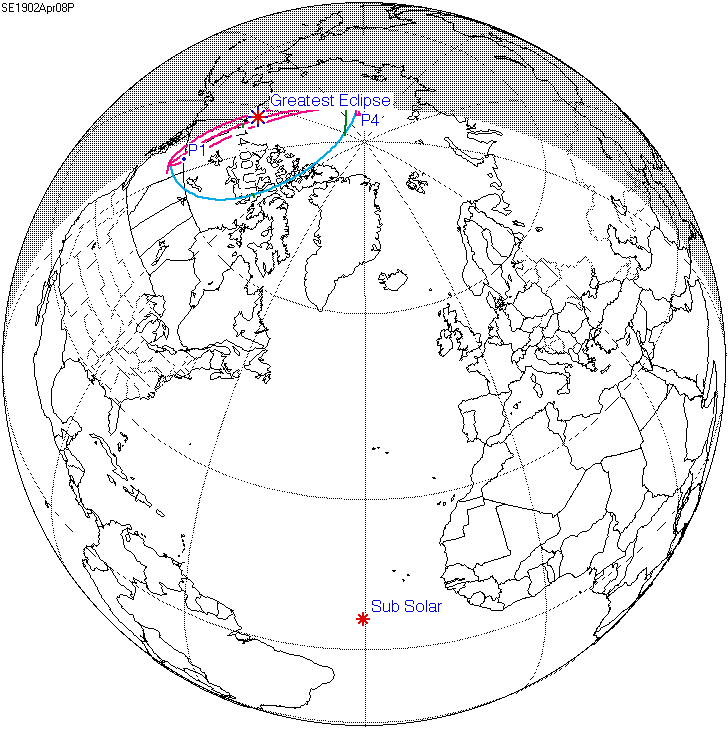
- Map
- Gamma: 1.5024
- Magnitude: 0.0643

Maximum eclipse
- Coordinates: 71.7°N 142.4°W

Times (UTC)
- Greatest eclipse: 14:05:06

References
- Saros: 108 (76 of 76)
- Catalog # (SE5000): 9286

A partial solar eclipse occurred at the Moon's descending node of orbit on Tuesday, April 8, 1902, with a magnitude of 0.0643. A solar eclipse occurs when the Moon passes between Earth and the Sun, thereby totally or partly obscuring the image of the Sun for a viewer on Earth. A partial solar eclipse occurs in the polar regions of the Earth when the center of the Moon's shadow misses the Earth.

A partial eclipse was visible for parts of Northern Canada. This was the 76th and final event from Solar Saros 108.

== Eclipse details ==
Shown below are two tables displaying details about this particular solar eclipse. The first table outlines times at which the Moon's penumbra or umbra attains the specific parameter, and the second table describes various other parameters pertaining to this eclipse.

April 8, 1902 Solar Eclipse Times
Event	Time (UTC)
First Penumbral External Contact	1902 April 8 at 13:30:48.0 UTC
Ecliptic Conjunction	1902 April 8 at 13:49:56.8 UTC
Greatest Eclipse	1902 April 8 at 14:05:06.1 UTC
Last Penumbral External Contact	1902 April 8 at 14:38:58.1 UTC
Equatorial Conjunction	1902 April 8 at 14:53:23.6 UTC

April 8, 1902 Solar Eclipse Parameters
Parameter	Value
Eclipse Magnitude	0.06431
Eclipse Obscuration	0.01951
Gamma	1.50241
Sun Right Ascension	01h05m40.1s
Sun Declination	+06°59'22.0"
Sun Semi-Diameter	15'58.0"
Sun Equatorial Horizontal Parallax	08.8"
Moon Right Ascension	01h03m53.9s
Moon Declination	+08°25'24.6"
Moon Semi-Diameter	16'21.4"
Moon Equatorial Horizontal Parallax	1°00'01.8"
ΔT	0.3 s

== Eclipse season ==
This eclipse is part of an eclipse season, a period, roughly every six months, when eclipses occur. Only two (or occasionally three) eclipse seasons occur each year, and each season lasts about 35 days and repeats just short of six months (173 days) later; thus two full eclipse seasons always occur each year. Either two or three eclipses happen each eclipse season. In the sequence below, each eclipse is separated by a fortnight. The first and last eclipse in this sequence is separated by one synodic month.

Eclipse season of April–May 1902
April 8 Descending node (new moon)	April 22 Ascending node (full moon)	May 7 Descending node (new moon)
Partial solar eclipse Solar Saros 108	Total lunar eclipse Lunar Saros 120	Partial solar eclipse Solar Saros 146

== Related eclipses ==
=== Eclipses in 1902 ===
- A partial solar eclipse on April 8.
- A total lunar eclipse on April 22.
- A partial solar eclipse on May 7.
- A total lunar eclipse on October 17.
- A partial solar eclipse on October 31.

=== Solar Saros 108 ===
- Preceded by: Solar eclipse of March 27, 1884

=== Solar eclipses of 1902–1906 ===
This eclipse is a member of a semester series. An eclipse in a semester series of solar eclipses repeats approximately every 177 days and 4 hours (a semester) at alternating nodes of the Moon's orbit.

The partial solar eclipses on May 7, 1902 and October 31, 1902 occur in the previous lunar year eclipse set, and the partial solar eclipse on July 21, 1906 occurs in the next lunar year eclipse set.

Solar eclipse series sets from 1902 to 1906
Descending node			Ascending node		
Saros	Map	Gamma	Saros	Map	Gamma
108	April 8, 1902 Partial	1.5024	113	October 1, 1902	
118	March 29, 1903 Annular	0.8413	123	September 21, 1903 Total	−0.8967
128	March 17, 1904 Annular	0.1299	133	September 9, 1904 Total	−0.1625
138	March 6, 1905 Annular	−0.5768	143	August 30, 1905 Total	0.5708
148	February 23, 1906 Partial	−1.2479	153	August 20, 1906 Partial	1.3731

=== Saros 108 ===
This eclipse is a part of Saros series 108, repeating every 18 years, 11 days, and containing 76 events. The series started with a partial solar eclipse on January 4, 550 AD. It contains annular eclipses from May 13, 766 AD through December 4, 1108; hybrid eclipses from December 15, 1126 through January 28, 1199; and total eclipses from February 7, 1217 through August 11, 1523. The series ends at member 76 as a partial eclipse on April 8, 1902. Its eclipses are tabulated in three columns; every third eclipse in the same column is one exeligmos apart, so they all cast shadows over approximately the same parts of the Earth.

The longest duration of annularity was produced by member 13 at 3 minutes, 35 seconds on May 13, 766 AD, and the longest duration of totality was produced by member 46 at 5 minutes, 7 seconds on May 5, 1361. All eclipses in this series occur at the Moon’s descending node of orbit.

Series members 71–76 occur between 1801 and 1902:
71	72	73
February 12, 1812	February 23, 1830	March 5, 1848
74	75	76
March 16, 1866	March 27, 1884	April 8, 1902

=== Metonic series ===
The metonic series repeats eclipses every 19 years (6939.69 days), lasting about 5 cycles. Eclipses occur in nearly the same calendar date. In addition, the octon subseries repeats 1/5 of that or every 3.8 years (1387.94 days). All eclipses in this table occur at the Moon's descending node.

22 eclipse events between April 8, 1902 and August 31, 1989
April 7–8	January 24–25	November 12	August 31–September 1	June 19–20
108	110	112	114	116
April 8, 1902			August 31, 1913	June 19, 1917
118	120	122	124	126
April 8, 1921	January 24, 1925	November 12, 1928	August 31, 1932	June 19, 1936
128	130	132	134	136
April 7, 1940	January 25, 1944	November 12, 1947	September 1, 1951	June 20, 1955
138	140	142	144	146
April 8, 1959	January 25, 1963	November 12, 1966	August 31, 1970	June 20, 1974
148	150	152	154	
April 7, 1978	January 25, 1982	November 12, 1985	August 31, 1989	

=== Tritos series ===
This eclipse is a part of a tritos cycle, repeating at alternating nodes every 135 synodic months (≈ 3986.63 days, or 11 years minus 1 month). Their appearance and longitude are irregular due to a lack of synchronization with the anomalistic month (period of perigee), but groupings of 3 tritos cycles (≈ 33 years minus 3 months) come close (≈ 434.044 anomalistic months), so eclipses are similar in these groupings.

The partial solar eclipses on April 8, 1902 (part of Saros 108) and January 5, 1935 (part of Saros 111) are also a part of this series but are not included in the table below.

Series members between 2000 and 2200
July 1, 2000 (Saros 117)	June 1, 2011 (Saros 118)	April 30, 2022 (Saros 119)	March 30, 2033 (Saros 120)	February 28, 2044 (Saros 121)
January 27, 2055 (Saros 122)	December 27, 2065 (Saros 123)	November 26, 2076 (Saros 124)	October 26, 2087 (Saros 125)	September 25, 2098 (Saros 126)
August 26, 2109 (Saros 127)	July 25, 2120 (Saros 128)	June 25, 2131 (Saros 129)	May 25, 2142 (Saros 130)	April 23, 2153 (Saros 131)
March 23, 2164 (Saros 132)	February 21, 2175 (Saros 133)	January 20, 2186 (Saros 134)	December 19, 2196 (Saros 135)	
