= Solar eclipse of September 30, 1913 =

20th-century partial solar eclipse

- Partial eclipse
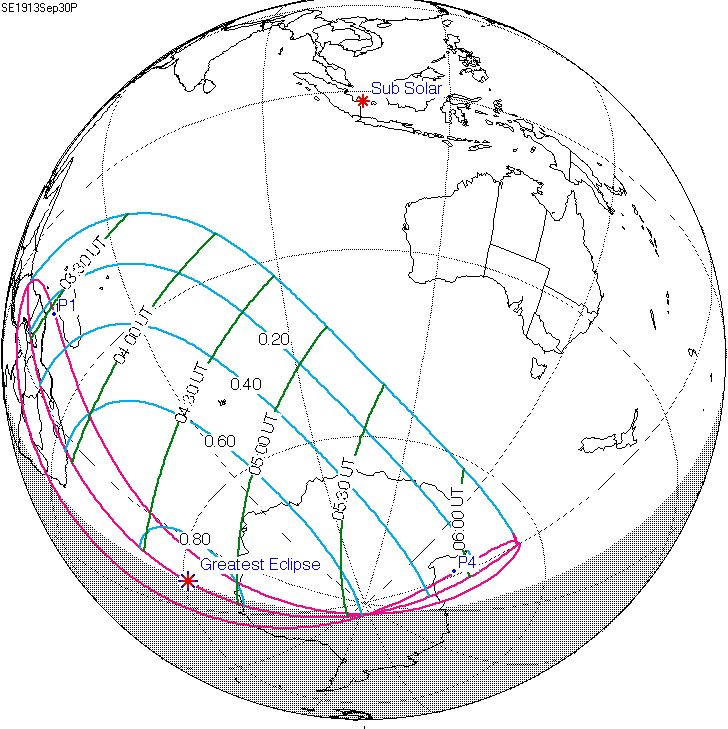
- Map
- Gamma: −1.1005
- Magnitude: 0.8252

Maximum eclipse
- Coordinates: 61°S 11.6°E

Times (UTC)
- Greatest eclipse: 4:45:49

References
- Saros: 152 (7 of 70)
- Catalog # (SE5000): 9311

A partial solar eclipse occurred at the Moon's descending node of orbit on Tuesday, September 30, 1913, with a magnitude of 0.8252. A solar eclipse occurs when the Moon passes between Earth and the Sun, thereby totally or partly obscuring the image of the Sun for a viewer on Earth. A partial solar eclipse occurs in the polar regions of the Earth when the center of the Moon's shadow misses the Earth.

A partial eclipse was visible for parts of Southern Africa and Antarctica.

== Eclipse details ==
Shown below are two tables displaying details about this particular solar eclipse. The first table outlines times at which the Moon's penumbra or umbra attains the specific parameter, and the second table describes various other parameters pertaining to this eclipse.

September 30, 1913 Solar Eclipse Times
Event	Time (UTC)
First Penumbral External Contact	1913 September 30 at 02:55:44.7 UTC
Greatest Eclipse	1913 September 30 at 04:45:48.6 UTC
Ecliptic Conjunction	1913 September 30 at 04:56:47.2 UTC
Equatorial Conjunction	1913 September 30 at 05:48:14.4 UTC
Last Penumbral External Contact	1913 September 30 at 06:35:28.6 UTC

September 30, 1913 Solar Eclipse Parameters
Parameter	Value
Eclipse Magnitude	0.82521
Eclipse Obscuration	0.78907
Gamma	−1.10053
Sun Right Ascension	12h23m33.6s
Sun Declination	-02°32'57.4"
Sun Semi-Diameter	15'58.5"
Sun Equatorial Horizontal Parallax	08.8"
Moon Right Ascension	12h21m23.5s
Moon Declination	-03°31'54.0"
Moon Semi-Diameter	16'42.2"
Moon Equatorial Horizontal Parallax	1°01'18.1"
ΔT	15.6 s

== Eclipse season ==
This eclipse is part of an eclipse season, a period, roughly every six months, when eclipses occur. Only two (or occasionally three) eclipse seasons occur each year, and each season lasts about 35 days and repeats just short of six months (173 days) later; thus two full eclipse seasons always occur each year. Either two or three eclipses happen each eclipse season. In the sequence below, each eclipse is separated by a fortnight. The first and last eclipse in this sequence is separated by one synodic month.

Eclipse season of August–September 1913
August 31 Descending node (new moon)	September 15 Ascending node (full moon)	September 30 Descending node (new moon)
Partial solar eclipse Solar Saros 114	Total lunar eclipse Lunar Saros 126	Partial solar eclipse Solar Saros 152

== Related eclipses ==
=== Eclipses in 1913 ===
- A total lunar eclipse on March 22.
- A partial solar eclipse on April 6.
- A partial solar eclipse on August 31.
- A total lunar eclipse on September 15.
- A partial solar eclipse on September 30.

=== Metonic ===
- Preceded by: Solar eclipse of December 12, 1909
- Followed by: Solar eclipse of July 19, 1917

=== Tzolkinex ===
- Preceded by: Solar eclipse of August 20, 1906
- Followed by: Solar eclipse of November 10, 1920

=== Half-Saros ===
- Preceded by: Lunar eclipse of September 24, 1904
- Followed by: Lunar eclipse of October 6, 1922

=== Tritos ===
- Preceded by: Solar eclipse of October 31, 1902
- Followed by: Solar eclipse of August 30, 1924

=== Solar Saros 152 ===
- Preceded by: Solar eclipse of September 18, 1895
- Followed by: Solar eclipse of October 11, 1931

=== Inex ===
- Preceded by: Solar eclipse of October 19, 1884
- Followed by: Solar eclipse of September 10, 1942

=== Triad ===
- Preceded by: Solar eclipse of November 29, 1826
- Followed by: Solar eclipse of July 31, 2000

=== Solar eclipses of 1910–1913 ===
This eclipse is a member of a semester series. An eclipse in a semester series of solar eclipses repeats approximately every 177 days and 4 hours (a semester) at alternating nodes of the Moon's orbit.

The partial solar eclipse on August 31, 1913 occurs in the next lunar year eclipse set.

Solar eclipse series sets from 1910 to 1913
Ascending node			Descending node		
Saros	Map	Gamma	Saros	Map	Gamma
117	May 9, 1910 Total	−0.9437	122	November 2, 1910 Partial	1.0603
127	April 28, 1911 Total	−0.2294	132	October 22, 1911 Annular	0.3224
137	April 17, 1912 Hybrid	0.528	142	October 10, 1912 Total	−0.4149
147	April 6, 1913 Partial	1.3147	152	September 30, 1913 Partial	−1.1005

=== Saros 152 ===
This eclipse is a part of Saros series 152, repeating every 18 years, 11 days, and containing 70 events. The series started with a partial solar eclipse on July 26, 1805. It contains total eclipses from November 2, 1967 through September 14, 2490; hybrid eclipses from September 26, 2508 through October 17, 2544; and annular eclipses from October 29, 2562 through June 16, 2941. The series ends at member 70 as a partial eclipse on August 20, 3049. Its eclipses are tabulated in three columns; every third eclipse in the same column is one exeligmos apart, so they all cast shadows over approximately the same parts of the Earth.

The longest duration of totality will be produced by member 30 at 5 minutes, 16 seconds on June 9, 2328, and the longest duration of annularity will be produced by member 53 at 5 minutes, 20 seconds on February 16, 2743. All eclipses in this series occur at the Moon’s descending node of orbit.

Series members 1–22 occur between 1805 and 2200:
1	2	3
July 26, 1805	August 6, 1823	August 16, 1841
4	5	6
August 28, 1859	September 7, 1877	September 18, 1895
7	8	9
September 30, 1913	October 11, 1931	October 21, 1949
10	11	12
November 2, 1967	November 12, 1985	November 23, 2003
13	14	15
December 4, 2021	December 15, 2039	December 26, 2057
16	17	18
January 6, 2076	January 16, 2094	January 29, 2112
19	20	21
February 8, 2130	February 19, 2148	March 2, 2166
22
March 12, 2184

=== Metonic series ===
The metonic series repeats eclipses every 19 years (6939.69 days), lasting about 5 cycles. Eclipses occur in nearly the same calendar date. In addition, the octon subseries repeats 1/5 of that or every 3.8 years (1387.94 days). All eclipses in this table occur at the Moon's descending node.

22 eclipse events between February 23, 1830 and July 19, 1917
February 22–23	December 11–12	September 29–30	July 18–19	May 6–7
108	110	112	114	116
February 23, 1830			July 18, 1841	May 6, 1845
118	120	122	124	126
February 23, 1849	December 11, 1852	September 29, 1856	July 18, 1860	May 6, 1864
128	130	132	134	136
February 23, 1868	December 12, 1871	September 29, 1875	July 19, 1879	May 6, 1883
138	140	142	144	146
February 22, 1887	December 12, 1890	September 29, 1894	July 18, 1898	May 7, 1902
148	150	152	154	
February 23, 1906	December 12, 1909	September 30, 1913	July 19, 1917	

=== Tritos series ===
This eclipse is a part of a tritos cycle, repeating at alternating nodes every 135 synodic months (≈ 3986.63 days, or 11 years minus 1 month). Their appearance and longitude are irregular due to a lack of synchronization with the anomalistic month (period of perigee), but groupings of 3 tritos cycles (≈ 33 years minus 3 months) come close (≈ 434.044 anomalistic months), so eclipses are similar in these groupings.

Series members between 1801 and 1946
August 5, 1804 (Saros 142)	July 6, 1815 (Saros 143)	June 5, 1826 (Saros 144)	May 4, 1837 (Saros 145)	April 3, 1848 (Saros 146)
March 4, 1859 (Saros 147)	January 31, 1870 (Saros 148)	December 31, 1880 (Saros 149)	December 1, 1891 (Saros 150)	October 31, 1902 (Saros 151)
September 30, 1913 (Saros 152)	August 30, 1924 (Saros 153)	July 30, 1935 (Saros 154)	June 29, 1946 (Saros 155)	

=== Inex series ===
This eclipse is a part of the long period inex cycle, repeating at alternating nodes, every 358 synodic months (≈ 10,571.95 days, or 29 years minus 20 days). Their appearance and longitude are irregular due to a lack of synchronization with the anomalistic month (period of perigee). However, groupings of 3 inex cycles (≈ 87 years minus 2 months) comes close (≈ 1,151.02 anomalistic months), so eclipses are similar in these groupings.

Series members between 1801 and 2200
November 29, 1826 (Saros 149)	November 9, 1855 (Saros 150)	October 19, 1884 (Saros 151)
September 30, 1913 (Saros 152)	September 10, 1942 (Saros 153)	August 20, 1971 (Saros 154)
July 31, 2000 (Saros 155)	July 11, 2029 (Saros 156)	June 21, 2058 (Saros 157)
June 1, 2087 (Saros 158)		
April 1, 2174 (Saros 161)		
