= Solar eclipse of August 29, 1886 =

Total eclipse

- Total eclipse
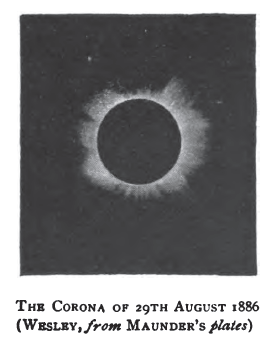

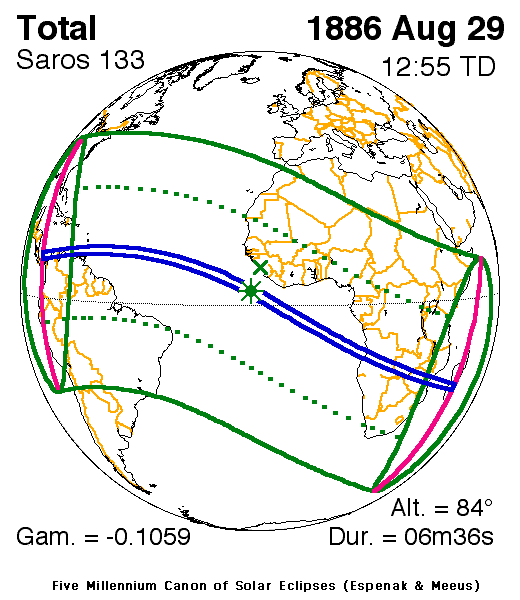
- Map
- Gamma: −0.1059
- Magnitude: 1.0735

Maximum eclipse
- Duration: 396 s (6 min 36 s)
- Coordinates: 3.5°N 15.3°W
- Max. width of band: 240 km (150 mi)

Times (UTC)
- Greatest eclipse: 12:55:23

References
- Saros: 133 (38 of 72)
- Catalog # (SE5000): 9249

A total solar eclipse occurred at the Moon's ascending node of orbit on Sunday, August 29, 1886, with a magnitude of 1.0735. A solar eclipse occurs when the Moon passes between Earth and the Sun, thereby totally or partly obscuring the image of the Sun for a viewer on Earth. A total solar eclipse occurs when the Moon's apparent diameter is larger than the Sun's, blocking all direct sunlight, turning day into darkness. Totality occurs in a narrow path across Earth's surface, with the partial solar eclipse visible over a surrounding region thousands of kilometres wide. Occurring about 4 hours after perigee (on August 29, 1886, at 8:55 UTC), the Moon's apparent diameter was larger.

The path of totality was visible from parts of modern-day Panama, Colombia, Venezuela, Grenada, Tobago, Saint Vincent and the Grenadines, Barbados, Angola, Zambia, Zimbabwe, Mozambique, and Madagascar. A partial solar eclipse was also visible for parts of eastern North America, Central America, the Caribbean, northern South America, and Africa.

== Observations ==
A team of astronomers travelled to the island of Grenada in the Caribbean to observe this eclipse. Their observation station was placed in Fort St. George.

== Eclipse details ==
Shown below are two tables displaying details about this particular solar eclipse. The first table outlines times at which the Moon's penumbra or umbra attains the specific parameter, and the second table describes various other parameters pertaining to this eclipse.

August 29, 1886 Solar Eclipse Times
Event	Time (UTC)
First Penumbral External Contact	1886 August 29 at 10:18:21.0 UTC
First Umbral External Contact	1886 August 29 at 11:11:44.6 UTC
First Central Line	1886 August 29 at 11:13:12.5 UTC
First Umbral Internal Contact	1886 August 29 at 11:14:40.4 UTC
First Penumbral Internal Contact	1886 August 29 at 12:08:31.9 UTC
Greatest Duration	1886 August 29 at 12:52:24.8 UTC
Ecliptic Conjunction	1886 August 29 at 12:54:18.0 UTC
Greatest Eclipse	1887 August 29 at 12:55:22.7 UTC
Equatorial Conjunction	1886 August 29 at 12:58:29.5 UTC
Last Penumbral Internal Contact	1886 August 29 at 13:42:08.5 UTC
Last Umbral Internal Contact	1886 August 29 at 14:36:03.1 UTC
Last Central Line	1886 August 29 at 14:37:30.7 UTC
Last Umbral External Contact	1886 August 29 at 14:38:58.4 UTC
Last Penumbral External Contact	1886 August 29 at 15:32:23.5 UTC

August 29, 1886 Solar Eclipse Parameters
Parameter	Value
Eclipse Magnitude	1.07351
Eclipse Obscuration	1.15242
Gamma	−0.10587
Sun Right Ascension	10h31m23.1s
Sun Declination	+09°17'26.5"
Sun Semi-Diameter	15'50.7"
Sun Equatorial Horizontal Parallax	08.7"
Moon Right Ascension	10h31m15.9s
Moon Declination	+09°11'12.6"
Moon Semi-Diameter	16'43.3"
Moon Equatorial Horizontal Parallax	1°01'22.2"
ΔT	-5.9 s

== Eclipse season ==
This eclipse is part of an eclipse season, a period, roughly every six months, when eclipses occur. Only two (or occasionally three) eclipse seasons occur each year, and each season lasts about 35 days and repeats just short of six months (173 days) later; thus two full eclipse seasons always occur each year. Either two or three eclipses happen each eclipse season. In the sequence below, each eclipse is separated by a fortnight. The first and last eclipse in this sequence is separated by one synodic month.

Eclipse season of August–September 1886
August 14 Descending node (full moon)	August 29 Ascending node (new moon)	September 13 Descending node (full moon)
Penumbral lunar eclipse Lunar Saros 107	Total solar eclipse Solar Saros 133	Penumbral lunar eclipse Lunar Saros 145

== Related eclipses ==
=== Eclipses in 1886 ===
- A penumbral lunar eclipse on February 18.
- An annular solar eclipse on March 5.
- A penumbral lunar eclipse on March 20.
- A penumbral lunar eclipse on August 14.
- A total solar eclipse on August 29.
- A penumbral lunar eclipse on September 13.

=== Metonic ===
- Preceded by: Solar eclipse of November 10, 1882
- Followed by: Solar eclipse of June 17, 1890

=== Tzolkinex ===
- Preceded by: Solar eclipse of July 19, 1879
- Followed by: Solar eclipse of October 9, 1893

=== Half-Saros ===
- Preceded by: Lunar eclipse of August 23, 1877
- Followed by: Lunar eclipse of September 4, 1895

=== Tritos ===
- Preceded by: Solar eclipse of September 29, 1875
- Followed by: Solar eclipse of July 29, 1897

=== Solar Saros 133 ===
- Preceded by: Solar eclipse of August 18, 1868
- Followed by: Solar eclipse of September 9, 1904

=== Inex ===
- Preceded by: Solar eclipse of September 18, 1857
- Followed by: Solar eclipse of August 10, 1915

=== Triad ===
- Preceded by: Solar eclipse of October 28, 1799
- Followed by: Solar eclipse of June 30, 1973

=== Solar eclipses of 1884–1888 ===
This eclipse is a member of a semester series. An eclipse in a semester series of solar eclipses repeats approximately every 177 days and 4 hours (a semester) at alternating nodes of the Moon's orbit.

The partial solar eclipses on April 25, 1884 and October 19, 1884 occur in the previous lunar year eclipse set, and the partial solar eclipse on July 9, 1888 occurs in the next lunar year eclipse set.

Solar eclipse series sets from 1884 to 1888
Descending node			Ascending node		
Saros	Map	Gamma	Saros	Map	Gamma
108	March 27, 1884 Partial	1.4602	113		
118	March 16, 1885 Annular	0.8030	123	September 8, 1885 Total	−0.8489
128	March 5, 1886 Annular	0.0970	133	August 29, 1886 Total	−0.1059
138	February 22, 1887 Annular	−0.6040	143	August 19, 1887 Total	0.6312
148	February 11, 1888 Partial	−1.2684	153	August 7, 1888 Partial	−1.2797

=== Saros 133 ===
This eclipse is a part of Saros series 133, repeating every 18 years, 11 days, and containing 72 events. The series started with a partial solar eclipse on July 13, 1219. It contains annular eclipses from November 20, 1435 through January 13, 1526; a hybrid eclipse on January 24, 1544; and total eclipses from February 3, 1562 through June 21, 2373. The series ends at member 72 as a partial eclipse on September 5, 2499. Its eclipses are tabulated in three columns; every third eclipse in the same column is one exeligmos apart, so they all cast shadows over approximately the same parts of the Earth.

The longest duration of annularity was produced by member 25 at 1 minutes, 14 seconds on November 30, 1453, and the longest duration of totality was produced by member 61 at 6 minutes, 50 seconds on August 7, 1850. All eclipses in this series occur at the Moon’s ascending node of orbit.

Series members 34–55 occur between 1801 and 2200:
34	35	36
July 17, 1814	July 27, 1832	August 7, 1850
37	38	39
August 18, 1868	August 29, 1886	September 9, 1904
40	41	42
September 21, 1922	October 1, 1940	October 12, 1958
43	44	45
October 23, 1976	November 3, 1994	November 13, 2012
46	47	48
November 25, 2030	December 5, 2048	December 17, 2066
49	50	51
December 27, 2084	January 8, 2103	January 19, 2121
52	53	54
January 30, 2139	February 9, 2157	February 21, 2175
55
March 3, 2193

=== Metonic series ===
The metonic series repeats eclipses every 19 years (6939.69 days), lasting about 5 cycles. Eclipses occur in nearly the same calendar date. In addition, the octon subseries repeats 1/5 of that or every 3.8 years (1387.94 days). All eclipses in this table occur at the Moon's ascending node.

25 eclipse events between April 5, 1837 and June 17, 1928
April 5–6	January 22–23	November 10–11	August 28–30	June 17–18
107	109	111	113	115
April 5, 1837	January 22, 1841	November 10, 1844	August 28, 1848	June 17, 1852
117	119	121	123	125
April 5, 1856	January 23, 1860	November 11, 1863	August 29, 1867	June 18, 1871
127	129	131	133	135
April 6, 1875	January 22, 1879	November 10, 1882	August 29, 1886	June 17, 1890
137	139	141	143	145
April 6, 1894	January 22, 1898	November 11, 1901	August 30, 1905	June 17, 1909
147	149	151	153	155
April 6, 1913	January 23, 1917	November 10, 1920	August 30, 1924	June 17, 1928

=== Tritos series ===
This eclipse is a part of a tritos cycle, repeating at alternating nodes every 135 synodic months (≈ 3986.63 days, or 11 years minus 1 month). Their appearance and longitude are irregular due to a lack of synchronization with the anomalistic month (period of perigee), but groupings of 3 tritos cycles (≈ 33 years minus 3 months) come close (≈ 434.044 anomalistic months), so eclipses are similar in these groupings.

Series members between 1801 and 2200
April 4, 1810 (Saros 126)	March 4, 1821 (Saros 127)	February 1, 1832 (Saros 128)	December 31, 1842 (Saros 129)	November 30, 1853 (Saros 130)
October 30, 1864 (Saros 131)	September 29, 1875 (Saros 132)	August 29, 1886 (Saros 133)	July 29, 1897 (Saros 134)	June 28, 1908 (Saros 135)
May 29, 1919 (Saros 136)	April 28, 1930 (Saros 137)	March 27, 1941 (Saros 138)	February 25, 1952 (Saros 139)	January 25, 1963 (Saros 140)
December 24, 1973 (Saros 141)	November 22, 1984 (Saros 142)	October 24, 1995 (Saros 143)	September 22, 2006 (Saros 144)	August 21, 2017 (Saros 145)
July 22, 2028 (Saros 146)	June 21, 2039 (Saros 147)	May 20, 2050 (Saros 148)	April 20, 2061 (Saros 149)	March 19, 2072 (Saros 150)
February 16, 2083 (Saros 151)	January 16, 2094 (Saros 152)	December 17, 2104 (Saros 153)	November 16, 2115 (Saros 154)	October 16, 2126 (Saros 155)
September 15, 2137 (Saros 156)	August 14, 2148 (Saros 157)	July 15, 2159 (Saros 158)	June 14, 2170 (Saros 159)	May 13, 2181 (Saros 160)
April 12, 2192 (Saros 161)

=== Inex series ===
This eclipse is a part of the long period inex cycle, repeating at alternating nodes, every 358 synodic months (≈ 10,571.95 days, or 29 years minus 20 days). Their appearance and longitude are irregular due to a lack of synchronization with the anomalistic month (period of perigee). However, groupings of 3 inex cycles (≈ 87 years minus 2 months) comes close (≈ 1,151.02 anomalistic months), so eclipses are similar in these groupings.

Series members between 1801 and 2200
October 9, 1828 (Saros 131)	September 18, 1857 (Saros 132)	August 29, 1886 (Saros 133)
August 10, 1915 (Saros 134)	July 20, 1944 (Saros 135)	June 30, 1973 (Saros 136)
June 10, 2002 (Saros 137)	May 21, 2031 (Saros 138)	April 30, 2060 (Saros 139)
April 10, 2089 (Saros 140)	March 22, 2118 (Saros 141)	March 2, 2147 (Saros 142)
February 10, 2176 (Saros 143)		
