= Solar eclipse of August 30, 1924 =

20th-century partial solar eclipse

- Partial eclipse
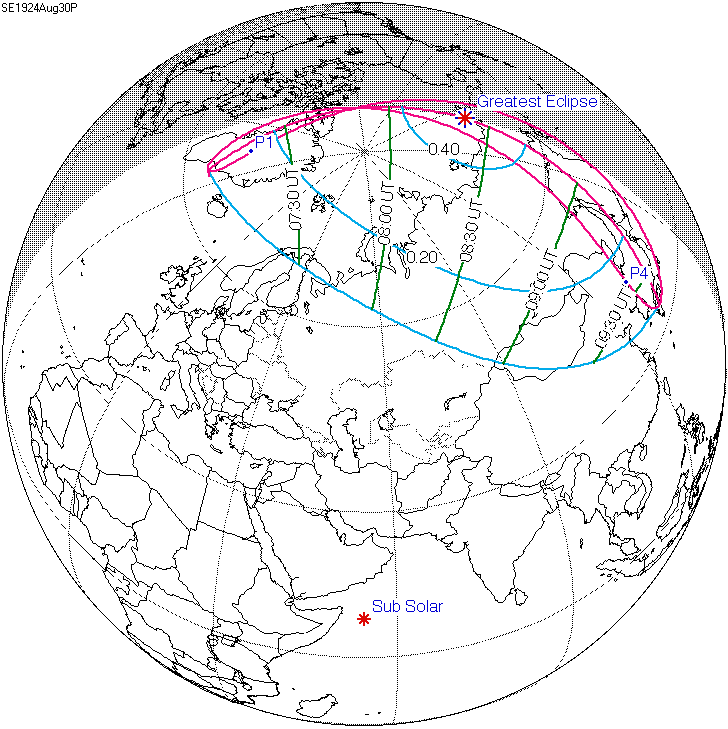
- Map
- Gamma: 1.3123
- Magnitude: 0.4245

Maximum eclipse
- Coordinates: 71.5°N 172.9°E

Times (UTC)
- Greatest eclipse: 8:23:00

References
- Saros: 153 (4 of 70)
- Catalog # (SE5000): 9337

A partial solar eclipse occurred at the Moon's ascending node of orbit on Saturday, August 30, 1924, with a magnitude of 0.4245. A solar eclipse occurs when the Moon passes between Earth and the Sun, thereby totally or partly obscuring the image of the Sun for a viewer on Earth. A partial solar eclipse occurs in the polar regions of the Earth when the center of the Moon's shadow misses the Earth.

A partial eclipse was visible for parts of Greenland, the Russian SFSR, and Northeast Asia.

== Eclipse details ==
Shown below are two tables displaying details about this particular solar eclipse. The first table outlines times at which the Moon's penumbra or umbra attains the specific parameter, and the second table describes various other parameters pertaining to this eclipse.

August 30, 1924 Solar Eclipse Times
Event	Time (UTC)
First Penumbral External Contact	1924 August 30 at 06:50:49.9 UTC
Equatorial Conjunction	1924 August 30 at 07:40:15.6 UTC
Greatest Eclipse	1924 August 30 at 08:23:00.2 UTC
Ecliptic Conjunction	1924 August 30 at 08:37:02.6 UTC
Last Penumbral External Contact	1924 August 30 at 09:55:25.5 UTC

August 30, 1924 Solar Eclipse Parameters
Parameter	Value
Eclipse Magnitude	0.42450
Eclipse Obscuration	0.30793
Gamma	1.31228
Sun Right Ascension	10h33m37.7s
Sun Declination	+09°04'07.2"
Sun Semi-Diameter	15'50.6"
Sun Equatorial Horizontal Parallax	08.7"
Moon Right Ascension	10h35m02.3s
Moon Declination	+10°15'33.7"
Moon Semi-Diameter	15'29.6"
Moon Equatorial Horizontal Parallax	0°56'51.5"
ΔT	23.6 s

== Eclipse season ==
This eclipse is part of an eclipse season, a period, roughly every six months, when eclipses occur. Only two (or occasionally three) eclipse seasons occur each year, and each season lasts about 35 days and repeats just short of six months (173 days) later; thus two full eclipse seasons always occur each year. Either two or three eclipses happen each eclipse season. In the sequence below, each eclipse is separated by a fortnight. The first and last eclipse in this sequence is separated by one synodic month.

Eclipse season of July–August 1924
July 31 Ascending node (new moon)	August 14 Descending node (full moon)	August 30 Ascending node (new moon)
Partial solar eclipse Solar Saros 115	Total lunar eclipse Lunar Saros 127	Partial solar eclipse Solar Saros 153

== Related eclipses ==
=== Eclipses in 1924 ===
- A total lunar eclipse on February 20.
- A partial solar eclipse on March 5.
- A partial solar eclipse on July 31.
- A total lunar eclipse on August 14.
- A partial solar eclipse on August 30.

=== Metonic ===
- Preceded by: Solar eclipse of November 10, 1920
- Followed by: Solar eclipse of June 17, 1928

=== Tzolkinex ===
- Preceded by: Solar eclipse of July 19, 1917
- Followed by: Solar eclipse of October 11, 1931

=== Half-Saros ===
- Preceded by: Lunar eclipse of August 24, 1915
- Followed by: Lunar eclipse of September 4, 1933

=== Tritos ===
- Preceded by: Solar eclipse of September 30, 1913
- Followed by: Solar eclipse of July 30, 1935

=== Solar Saros 153 ===
- Preceded by: Solar eclipse of August 20, 1906
- Followed by: Solar eclipse of September 10, 1942

=== Inex ===
- Preceded by: Solar eclipse of September 18, 1895
- Followed by: Solar eclipse of August 9, 1953

=== Triad ===
- Preceded by: Solar eclipse of October 29, 1837
- Followed by: Solar eclipse of July 1, 2011

=== Solar eclipses of 1921–1924 ===
This eclipse is a member of a semester series. An eclipse in a semester series of solar eclipses repeats approximately every 177 days and 4 hours (a semester) at alternating nodes of the Moon's orbit.

The partial solar eclipse on July 31, 1924 occurs in the next lunar year eclipse set.

Solar eclipse series sets from 1921 to 1924
Descending node			Ascending node		
Saros	Map	Gamma	Saros	Map	Gamma
118	April 8, 1921 Annular	0.8869	123	October 1, 1921 Total	−0.9383
128	March 28, 1922 Annular	0.1711	133	September 21, 1922 Total	−0.213
138	March 17, 1923 Annular	−0.5438	143	September 10, 1923 Total	0.5149
148	March 5, 1924 Partial	−1.2232	153	August 30, 1924 Partial	1.3123

=== Saros 153 ===
This eclipse is a part of Saros series 153, repeating every 18 years, 11 days, and containing 70 events. The series started with a partial solar eclipse on July 28, 1870. It contains annular eclipses from December 17, 2104 through May 26, 2970. There are no hybrid or total eclipses in this set. The series ends at member 70 as a partial eclipse on August 22, 3114. Its eclipses are tabulated in three columns; every third eclipse in the same column is one exeligmos apart, so they all cast shadows over approximately the same parts of the Earth.

The longest duration of annularity will be produced by member 38 at 7 minutes, 1 seconds on September 5, 2537. All eclipses in this series occur at the Moon’s ascending node of orbit.

Series members 1–19 occur between 1870 and 2200:
1	2	3
July 28, 1870	August 7, 1888	August 20, 1906
4	5	6
August 30, 1924	September 10, 1942	September 20, 1960
7	8	9
October 2, 1978	October 12, 1996	October 23, 2014
10	11	12
November 3, 2032	November 14, 2050	November 24, 2068
13	14	15
December 6, 2086	December 17, 2104	December 28, 2122
16	17	18
January 8, 2141	January 19, 2159	January 29, 2177
19
February 10, 2195

=== Metonic series ===
The metonic series repeats eclipses every 19 years (6939.69 days), lasting about 5 cycles. Eclipses occur in nearly the same calendar date. In addition, the octon subseries repeats 1/5 of that or every 3.8 years (1387.94 days). All eclipses in this table occur at the Moon's ascending node.

25 eclipse events between April 5, 1837 and June 17, 1928
April 5–6	January 22–23	November 10–11	August 28–30	June 17–18
107	109	111	113	115
April 5, 1837	January 22, 1841	November 10, 1844	August 28, 1848	June 17, 1852
117	119	121	123	125
April 5, 1856	January 23, 1860	November 11, 1863	August 29, 1867	June 18, 1871
127	129	131	133	135
April 6, 1875	January 22, 1879	November 10, 1882	August 29, 1886	June 17, 1890
137	139	141	143	145
April 6, 1894	January 22, 1898	November 11, 1901	August 30, 1905	June 17, 1909
147	149	151	153	155
April 6, 1913	January 23, 1917	November 10, 1920	August 30, 1924	June 17, 1928

=== Tritos series ===
This eclipse is a part of a tritos cycle, repeating at alternating nodes every 135 synodic months (≈ 3986.63 days, or 11 years minus 1 month). Their appearance and longitude are irregular due to a lack of synchronization with the anomalistic month (period of perigee), but groupings of 3 tritos cycles (≈ 33 years minus 3 months) come close (≈ 434.044 anomalistic months), so eclipses are similar in these groupings.

Series members between 1801 and 1946
August 5, 1804 (Saros 142)	July 6, 1815 (Saros 143)	June 5, 1826 (Saros 144)	May 4, 1837 (Saros 145)	April 3, 1848 (Saros 146)
March 4, 1859 (Saros 147)	January 31, 1870 (Saros 148)	December 31, 1880 (Saros 149)	December 1, 1891 (Saros 150)	October 31, 1902 (Saros 151)
September 30, 1913 (Saros 152)	August 30, 1924 (Saros 153)	July 30, 1935 (Saros 154)	June 29, 1946 (Saros 155)	

=== Inex series ===
This eclipse is a part of the long period inex cycle, repeating at alternating nodes, every 358 synodic months (≈ 10,571.95 days, or 29 years minus 20 days). Their appearance and longitude are irregular due to a lack of synchronization with the anomalistic month (period of perigee). However, groupings of 3 inex cycles (≈ 87 years minus 2 months) comes close (≈ 1,151.02 anomalistic months), so eclipses are similar in these groupings.

Series members between 1801 and 2069
November 18, 1808 (Saros 149)	October 29, 1837 (Saros 150)	October 8, 1866 (Saros 151)
September 18, 1895 (Saros 152)	August 30, 1924 (Saros 153)	August 9, 1953 (Saros 154)
July 20, 1982 (Saros 155)	July 1, 2011 (Saros 156)	
May 20, 2069 (Saros 158)		
