= Solar eclipse of November 10, 1920 =

20th-century partial solar eclipse

- Partial eclipse
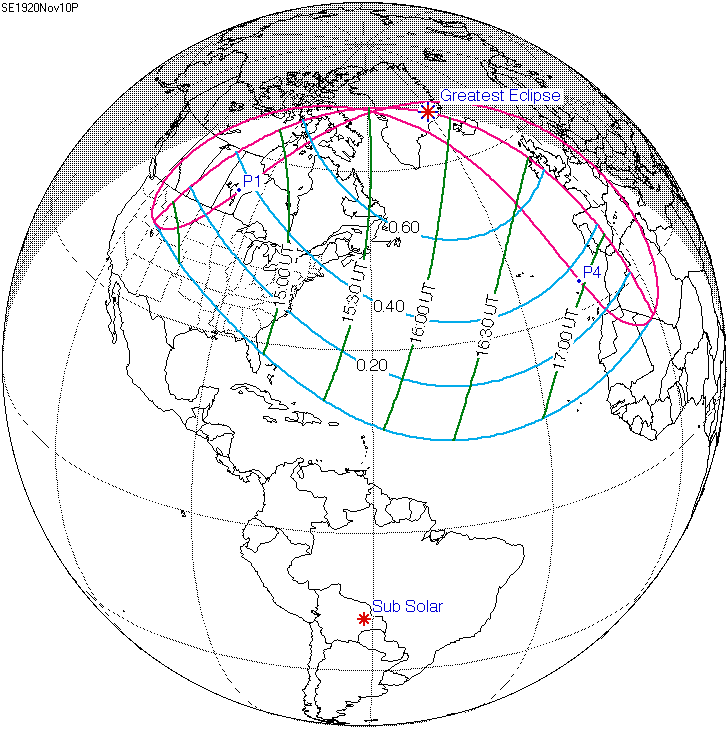
- Map
- Gamma: 1.1287
- Magnitude: 0.742

Maximum eclipse
- Coordinates: 69.9°N 29.8°W

Times (UTC)
- Greatest eclipse: 15:52:15

References
- Saros: 151 (9 of 72)
- Catalog # (SE5000): 9329

A partial solar eclipse occurred at the Moon's ascending node of orbit on Wednesday, November 10, 1920, with a magnitude of 0.742. A solar eclipse occurs when the Moon passes between Earth and the Sun, thereby totally or partly obscuring the image of the Sun for a viewer on Earth. A partial solar eclipse occurs in the polar regions of the Earth when the center of the Moon's shadow passes above or below the Earth.

A partial eclipse was visible for parts of Canada, the United States, Northwest Africa, and Western Europe.

== Eclipse details ==
Shown below are two tables displaying details about this particular solar eclipse. The first table outlines times at which the Moon's penumbra or umbra attains the specific parameter, and the second table describes various other parameters pertaining to this eclipse.

November 10, 1920 Solar Eclipse Times
Event	Time (UTC)
First Penumbral External Contact	1920 November 10 at 13:47:26.5 UTC
Equatorial Conjunction	1920 November 10 at 15:28:01.8 UTC
Greatest Eclipse	1920 November 10 at 15:52:15.0 UTC
Ecliptic Conjunction	1920 November 10 at 16:05:10.6 UTC
Last Penumbral External Contact	1920 November 10 at 17:57:19.7 UTC

November 10, 1920 Solar Eclipse Parameters
Parameter	Value
Eclipse Magnitude	0.74201
Eclipse Obscuration	0.65874
Gamma	1.12869
Sun Right Ascension	15h02m00.4s
Sun Declination	-17°11'23.8"
Sun Semi-Diameter	16'09.4"
Sun Equatorial Horizontal Parallax	08.9"
Moon Right Ascension	15h02m47.8s
Moon Declination	-16°10'02.1"
Moon Semi-Diameter	15'06.3"
Moon Equatorial Horizontal Parallax	0°55'26.3"
ΔT	22.1 s

== Eclipse season ==
This eclipse is part of an eclipse season, a period, roughly every six months, when eclipses occur. Only two (or occasionally three) eclipse seasons occur each year, and each season lasts about 35 days and repeats just short of six months (173 days) later; thus two full eclipse seasons always occur each year. Either two or three eclipses happen each eclipse season. In the sequence below, each eclipse is separated by a fortnight.

Eclipse season of October–November 1920
October 27 Descending node (full moon)	November 10 Ascending node (new moon)
Total lunar eclipse Lunar Saros 125	Partial solar eclipse Solar Saros 151

== Related eclipses ==
=== Eclipses in 1920 ===
- A total lunar eclipse on May 3.
- A partial solar eclipse on May 18.
- A total lunar eclipse on October 27.
- A partial solar eclipse on November 10.

=== Metonic ===
- Preceded by: Solar eclipse of January 23, 1917
- Followed by: Solar eclipse of August 30, 1924

=== Tzolkinex ===
- Preceded by: Solar eclipse of September 30, 1913
- Followed by: Solar eclipse of December 24, 1927

=== Half-Saros ===
- Preceded by: Lunar eclipse of November 6, 1911
- Followed by: Lunar eclipse of November 17, 1929

=== Tritos ===
- Preceded by: Solar eclipse of December 12, 1909
- Followed by: Solar eclipse of October 11, 1931

=== Solar Saros 151 ===
- Preceded by: Solar eclipse of October 31, 1902
- Followed by: Solar eclipse of November 21, 1938

=== Inex ===
- Preceded by: Solar eclipse of December 1, 1891
- Followed by: Solar eclipse of October 21, 1949

=== Triad ===
- Preceded by: Solar eclipse of January 9, 1834
- Followed by: Solar eclipse of September 11, 2007

=== Solar eclipses of 1916–1920 ===
This eclipse is a member of a semester series. An eclipse in a semester series of solar eclipses repeats approximately every 177 days and 4 hours (a semester) at alternating nodes of the Moon's orbit.

The solar eclipses on February 3, 1916 (total), July 30, 1916 (annular), January 23, 1917 (partial), and July 19, 1917 (partial) occur in the previous lunar year eclipse set.

Solar eclipse series sets from 1916 to 1920
Ascending node			Descending node		
Saros	Map	Gamma	Saros	Map	Gamma
111	December 24, 1916 Partial	−1.5321	116	June 19, 1917 Partial	1.2857
121	December 14, 1917 Annular	−0.9157	126	June 8, 1918 Total	0.4658
131	December 3, 1918 Annular	−0.2387	136 Totality in Príncipe	May 29, 1919 Total	−0.2955
141	November 22, 1919 Annular	0.4549	146	May 18, 1920 Partial	−1.0239
151	November 10, 1920 Partial	1.1287			

=== Saros 151 ===
This eclipse is a part of Saros series 151, repeating every 18 years, 11 days, and containing 72 events. The series started with a partial solar eclipse on August 14, 1776. It contains annular eclipses from February 28, 2101 through April 23, 2191; a hybrid eclipse on May 5, 2209; and total eclipses from May 16, 2227 through July 6, 2912. The series ends at member 72 as a partial eclipse on October 1, 3056. Its eclipses are tabulated in three columns; every third eclipse in the same column is one exeligmos apart, so they all cast shadows over approximately the same parts of the Earth.

The longest duration of annularity will be produced by member 19 at 2 minutes, 44 seconds on February 28, 2101, and the longest duration of totality will be produced by member 60 at 5 minutes, 41 seconds on May 22, 2840. All eclipses in this series occur at the Moon’s ascending node of orbit.

Series members 3–24 occur between 1801 and 2200:
3	4	5
September 5, 1812	September 17, 1830	September 27, 1848
6	7	8
October 8, 1866	October 19, 1884	October 31, 1902
9	10	11
November 10, 1920	November 21, 1938	December 2, 1956
12	13	14
December 13, 1974	December 24, 1992	January 4, 2011
15	16	17
January 14, 2029	January 26, 2047	February 5, 2065
18	19	20
February 16, 2083	February 28, 2101	March 11, 2119
21	22	23
March 21, 2137	April 2, 2155	April 12, 2173
24
April 23, 2191

=== Metonic series ===
The metonic series repeats eclipses every 19 years (6939.69 days), lasting about 5 cycles. Eclipses occur in nearly the same calendar date. In addition, the octon subseries repeats 1/5 of that or every 3.8 years (1387.94 days). All eclipses in this table occur at the Moon's ascending node.

25 eclipse events between April 5, 1837 and June 17, 1928
April 5–6	January 22–23	November 10–11	August 28–30	June 17–18
107	109	111	113	115
April 5, 1837	January 22, 1841	November 10, 1844	August 28, 1848	June 17, 1852
117	119	121	123	125
April 5, 1856	January 23, 1860	November 11, 1863	August 29, 1867	June 18, 1871
127	129	131	133	135
April 6, 1875	January 22, 1879	November 10, 1882	August 29, 1886	June 17, 1890
137	139	141	143	145
April 6, 1894	January 22, 1898	November 11, 1901	August 30, 1905	June 17, 1909
147	149	151	153	155
April 6, 1913	January 23, 1917	November 10, 1920	August 30, 1924	June 17, 1928

=== Tritos series ===
This eclipse is a part of a tritos cycle, repeating at alternating nodes every 135 synodic months (≈ 3986.63 days, or 11 years minus 1 month). Their appearance and longitude are irregular due to a lack of synchronization with the anomalistic month (period of perigee), but groupings of 3 tritos cycles (≈ 33 years minus 3 months) come close (≈ 434.044 anomalistic months), so eclipses are similar in these groupings.

Series members between 1801 and 1964
September 17, 1811 (Saros 141)	August 16, 1822 (Saros 142)	July 17, 1833 (Saros 143)	June 16, 1844 (Saros 144)	May 16, 1855 (Saros 145)
April 15, 1866 (Saros 146)	March 15, 1877 (Saros 147)	February 11, 1888 (Saros 148)	January 11, 1899 (Saros 149)	December 12, 1909 (Saros 150)
November 10, 1920 (Saros 151)	October 11, 1931 (Saros 152)	September 10, 1942 (Saros 153)	August 9, 1953 (Saros 154)	July 9, 1964 (Saros 155)

=== Inex series ===
This eclipse is a part of the long period inex cycle, repeating at alternating nodes, every 358 synodic months (≈ 10,571.95 days, or 29 years minus 20 days). Their appearance and longitude are irregular due to a lack of synchronization with the anomalistic month (period of perigee). However, groupings of 3 inex cycles (≈ 87 years minus 2 months) comes close (≈ 1,151.02 anomalistic months), so eclipses are similar in these groupings.

Series members between 1801 and 2200
January 30, 1805 (Saros 147)	January 9, 1834 (Saros 148)	December 21, 1862 (Saros 149)
December 1, 1891 (Saros 150)	November 10, 1920 (Saros 151)	October 21, 1949 (Saros 152)
October 2, 1978 (Saros 153)	September 11, 2007 (Saros 154)	August 21, 2036 (Saros 155)
August 2, 2065 (Saros 156)	July 12, 2094 (Saros 157)	June 23, 2123 (Saros 158)
June 3, 2152 (Saros 159)	May 13, 2181 (Saros 160)	
