= Solar eclipse of March 25, 1857 =

Total eclipse

- Total eclipse
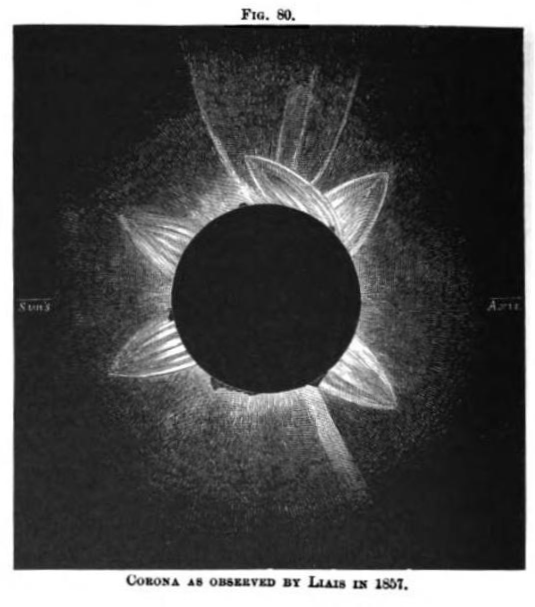

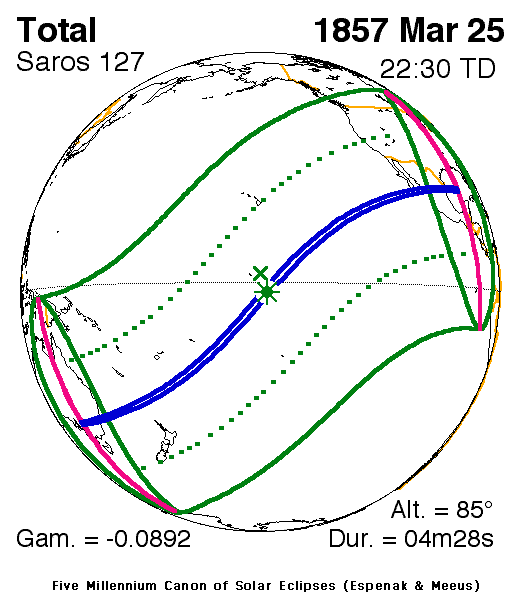
- Map
- Gamma: −0.0892
- Magnitude: 1.0534

Maximum eclipse
- Duration: 268 s (4 min 28 s)
- Coordinates: 2.4°S 153.4°W
- Max. width of band: 177 km (110 mi)

Times (UTC)
- Greatest eclipse: 22:29:38

References
- Saros: 127 (49 of 82)
- Catalog # (SE5000): 9179

A total solar eclipse occurred at the Moon's ascending node of orbit between Wednesday, March 25 and Thursday, March 26, 1857, with a magnitude of 1.0534. A solar eclipse occurs when the Moon passes between Earth and the Sun, thereby totally or partly obscuring the image of the Sun for a viewer on Earth. A total solar eclipse occurs when the Moon's apparent diameter is larger than the Sun's, blocking all direct sunlight, turning day into darkness. Totality occurs in a narrow path across Earth's surface, with the partial solar eclipse visible over a surrounding region thousands of kilometres wide. Occurring about 1.1 days before perigee (on March 26, 1857, at 23:55 UTC), the Moon's apparent diameter was larger.

The path of totality was visible from parts of modern-day southeastern Australia, Niue, the Cook Islands, Kiribati, Mexico. A partial solar eclipse was also visible for parts of Australia, Oceania, Hawaii, western North America, and Central America.

== Eclipse details ==
Shown below are two tables displaying details about this particular solar eclipse. The first table outlines times at which the Moon's penumbra or umbra attains the specific parameter, and the second table describes various other parameters pertaining to this eclipse.

March 25, 1857 Solar Eclipse Times
Event	Time (UTC)
First Penumbral External Contact	1857 March 25 at 19:50:30.7 UTC
First Umbral External Contact	1857 March 25 at 20:45:26.6 UTC
First Central Line	1857 March 25 at 20:46:23.7 UTC
First Umbral Internal Contact	1857 March 25 at 20:47:20.8 UTC
First Penumbral Internal Contact	1857 March 25 at 21:42:38.0 UTC
Equatorial Conjunction	1857 March 25 at 22:24:29.2 UTC
Ecliptic Conjunction	1857 March 25 at 22:28:42.5 UTC
Greatest Eclipse	1857 March 25 at 22:29:37.6 UTC
Greatest Duration	1857 March 25 at 22:31:46.5 UTC
Last Penumbral Internal Contact	1857 March 25 at 23:16:44.6 UTC
Last Umbral Internal Contact	1857 March 26 at 00:11:55.9 UTC
Last Central Line	1857 March 26 at 00:12:54.3 UTC
Last Umbral External Contact	1857 March 26 at 00:13:52.8 UTC
Last Penumbral External Contact	1857 March 26 at 01:08:43.7 UTC

March 25, 1857 Solar Eclipse Parameters
Parameter	Value
Eclipse Magnitude	1.05342
Eclipse Obscuration	1.10969
Gamma	−0.08923
Sun Right Ascension	00h19m12.6s
Sun Declination	+02°04'51.1"
Sun Semi-Diameter	16'01.4"
Sun Equatorial Horizontal Parallax	08.8"
Moon Right Ascension	00h19m23.1s
Moon Declination	+02°00'06.7"
Moon Semi-Diameter	16'35.7"
Moon Equatorial Horizontal Parallax	1°00'54.1"
ΔT	7.0 s

== Eclipse season ==
This eclipse is part of an eclipse season, a period, roughly every six months, when eclipses occur. Only two (or occasionally three) eclipse seasons occur each year, and each season lasts about 35 days and repeats just short of six months (173 days) later; thus two full eclipse seasons always occur each year. Either two or three eclipses happen each eclipse season. In the sequence below, each eclipse is separated by a fortnight.

Eclipse season of March–April 1857
March 25 Ascending node (new moon)	April 9 Descending node (full moon)
Total solar eclipse Solar Saros 127	Penumbral lunar eclipse Lunar Saros 139

== Related eclipses ==
=== Eclipses in 1857 ===
- An total solar eclipse on March 25.
- A penumbral lunar eclipse on April 9.
- A penumbral lunar eclipse on September 4.
- An annular solar eclipse on September 18.
- A penumbral lunar eclipse on October 3.

=== Metonic ===
- Preceded by: Solar eclipse of November 20, 1854
- Followed by: Solar eclipse of June 27, 1862

=== Tzolkinex ===
- Preceded by: Solar eclipse of February 12, 1850
- Followed by: Solar eclipse of May 6, 1864

=== Half-Saros ===
- Preceded by: Lunar eclipse of March 19, 1848
- Followed by: Lunar eclipse of March 31, 1866

=== Tritos ===
- Preceded by: Solar eclipse of April 25, 1846
- Followed by: Solar eclipse of February 23, 1868

=== Solar Saros 127 ===
- Preceded by: Solar eclipse of March 15, 1839
- Followed by: Solar eclipse of April 6, 1875

=== Inex ===
- Preceded by: Solar eclipse of April 14, 1828
- Followed by: Solar eclipse of March 5, 1886

=== Triad ===
- Preceded by: Solar eclipse of May 25, 1770
- Followed by: Solar eclipse of January 25, 1944

=== Solar eclipses of 1856–1859 ===
This eclipse is a member of a semester series. An eclipse in a semester series of solar eclipses repeats approximately every 177 days and 4 hours (a semester) at alternating nodes of the Moon's orbit.

The partial solar eclipses on February 3, 1859 and July 29, 1859 occur in the next lunar year eclipse set.

Solar eclipse series sets from 1856 to 1859
Ascending node			Descending node		
Saros	Map	Gamma	Saros	Map	Gamma
117	April 5, 1856 Total	−0.7906	122	September 29, 1856 Annular	0.9420
127	March 25, 1857 Total	−0.0892	132	September 18, 1857 Annular	0.1912
137	March 15, 1858 Annular	0.6461	142	September 7, 1858 Total	−0.5609
147	March 4, 1859 Partial	1.4192	152	August 28, 1859 Partial	−1.2569

=== Saros 127 ===
This eclipse is a part of Saros series 127, repeating every 18 years, 11 days, and containing 82 events. The series started with a partial solar eclipse on October 10, 991 AD. It contains total eclipses from May 14, 1352 through August 15, 2091. There are no annular or hybrid eclipses in this set. The series ends at member 82 as a partial eclipse on March 21, 2452. Its eclipses are tabulated in three columns; every third eclipse in the same column is one exeligmos apart, so they all cast shadows over approximately the same parts of the Earth.

The longest duration of totality was produced by member 31 at 5 minutes, 40 seconds on August 30, 1532. All eclipses in this series occur at the Moon’s ascending node of orbit.

Series members 46–68 occur between 1801 and 2200:
46	47	48
February 21, 1803	March 4, 1821	March 15, 1839
49	50	51
March 25, 1857	April 6, 1875	April 16, 1893
52	53	54
April 28, 1911	May 9, 1929	May 20, 1947
55	56	57
May 30, 1965	June 11, 1983	June 21, 2001
58	59	60
July 2, 2019	July 13, 2037	July 24, 2055
61	62	63
August 3, 2073	August 15, 2091	August 26, 2109
64	65	66
September 6, 2127	September 16, 2145	September 28, 2163
67	68	
October 8, 2181	October 19, 2199	

=== Metonic series ===
The metonic series repeats eclipses every 19 years (6939.69 days), lasting about 5 cycles. Eclipses occur in nearly the same calendar date. In addition, the octon subseries repeats 1/5 of that or every 3.8 years (1387.94 days). All eclipses in this table occur at the Moon's ascending node.

24 eclipse events between March 25, 1819 and August 20, 1906
March 25–26	January 11–12	October 30–31	August 18–20	June 6–7
107	109	111	113	115
March 25, 1819	January 12, 1823	October 31, 1826	August 18, 1830	June 7, 1834
117	119	121	123	125
March 25, 1838	January 11, 1842	October 30, 1845	August 18, 1849	June 6, 1853
127	129	131	133	135
March 25, 1857	January 11, 1861	October 30, 1864	August 18, 1868	June 6, 1872
137	139	141	143	145
March 25, 1876	January 11, 1880	October 30, 1883	August 19, 1887	June 6, 1891
147	149	151	153	
March 26, 1895	January 11, 1899	October 31, 1902	August 20, 1906	

=== Tritos series ===
This eclipse is a part of a tritos cycle, repeating at alternating nodes every 135 synodic months (≈ 3986.63 days, or 11 years minus 1 month). Their appearance and longitude are irregular due to a lack of synchronization with the anomalistic month (period of perigee), but groupings of 3 tritos cycles (≈ 33 years minus 3 months) come close (≈ 434.044 anomalistic months), so eclipses are similar in these groupings.

Series members between 1801 and 2200
August 28, 1802 (Saros 122)	July 27, 1813 (Saros 123)	June 26, 1824 (Saros 124)	May 27, 1835 (Saros 125)	April 25, 1846 (Saros 126)
March 25, 1857 (Saros 127)	February 23, 1868 (Saros 128)	January 22, 1879 (Saros 129)	December 22, 1889 (Saros 130)	November 22, 1900 (Saros 131)
October 22, 1911 (Saros 132)	September 21, 1922 (Saros 133)	August 21, 1933 (Saros 134)	July 20, 1944 (Saros 135)	June 20, 1955 (Saros 136)
May 20, 1966 (Saros 137)	April 18, 1977 (Saros 138)	March 18, 1988 (Saros 139)	February 16, 1999 (Saros 140)	January 15, 2010 (Saros 141)
December 14, 2020 (Saros 142)	November 14, 2031 (Saros 143)	October 14, 2042 (Saros 144)	September 12, 2053 (Saros 145)	August 12, 2064 (Saros 146)
July 13, 2075 (Saros 147)	June 11, 2086 (Saros 148)	May 11, 2097 (Saros 149)	April 11, 2108 (Saros 150)	March 11, 2119 (Saros 151)
February 8, 2130 (Saros 152)	January 8, 2141 (Saros 153)	December 8, 2151 (Saros 154)	November 7, 2162 (Saros 155)	October 7, 2173 (Saros 156)
September 4, 2184 (Saros 157)	August 5, 2195 (Saros 158)			

=== Inex series ===
This eclipse is a part of the long period inex cycle, repeating at alternating nodes, every 358 synodic months (≈ 10,571.95 days, or 29 years minus 20 days). Their appearance and longitude are irregular due to a lack of synchronization with the anomalistic month (period of perigee). However, groupings of 3 inex cycles (≈ 87 years minus 2 months) comes close (≈ 1,151.02 anomalistic months), so eclipses are similar in these groupings.

Series members between 1801 and 2200
April 14, 1828 (Saros 126)	March 25, 1857 (Saros 127)	March 5, 1886 (Saros 128)
February 14, 1915 (Saros 129)	January 25, 1944 (Saros 130)	January 4, 1973 (Saros 131)
December 14, 2001 (Saros 132)	November 25, 2030 (Saros 133)	November 5, 2059 (Saros 134)
October 14, 2088 (Saros 135)	September 26, 2117 (Saros 136)	September 6, 2146 (Saros 137)
August 16, 2175 (Saros 138)		
