= Solar eclipse of August 19, 1887 =

Total eclipse

- Total eclipse
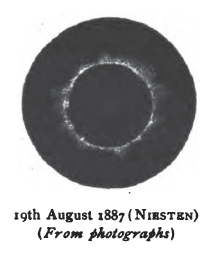

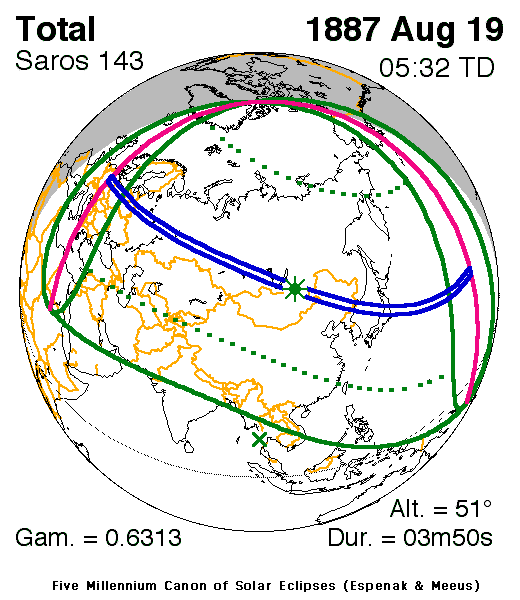
- Map
- Gamma: 0.6312
- Magnitude: 1.0518

Maximum eclipse
- Duration: 230 s (3 min 50 s)
- Coordinates: 50.6°N 111.9°E
- Max. width of band: 221 km (137 mi)

Times (UTC)
- Greatest eclipse: 5:32:05

References
- Saros: 143 (16 of 72)
- Catalog # (SE5000): 9251

A total solar eclipse occurred at the Moon's ascending node of orbit on Friday, August 19, 1887, with a magnitude of 1.0518. A solar eclipse occurs when the Moon passes between Earth and the Sun, thereby totally or partly obscuring the image of the Sun for a viewer on Earth. A total solar eclipse occurs when the Moon's apparent diameter is larger than the Sun's, blocking all direct sunlight, turning day into darkness. Totality occurs in a narrow path across Earth's surface, with the partial solar eclipse visible over a surrounding region thousands of kilometres wide. Occurring about 1.8 days before perigee (on August 21, 1887, at 0:10 UTC), the Moon's apparent diameter was larger.

The path of totality was visible from parts of modern-day Germany, Poland, Belarus, Lithuania, southeastern Latvia, Russia, Mongolia, China, North Korea, and Japan. A partial solar eclipse was also visible for parts of Europe, Northeast Africa, Asia, northern Greenland, and Alaska.

== Observations ==
The Russian chemist Dmitri Mendeleev ascended in a balloon near Moscow to observe this eclipse. The weather in Tver Governorate was cloudy and it was rain at morning, so Mendeleev forced to fly alone. He made some notes at 6:55, 20 minutes after the start, and made some observations of the solar corona. For this flight, the scientist was awarded the medal of the Academy of Aerostatic Meteorology.

Partiality at sunrise from Berlin, Germany	Ilya Repin, “The Solar Eclipse of 1887” (“Dmitri Ivanovich Mendeleev on the aerostat”), 1887.

Russian writer Anton Chekhov published the short story "From the Diary of a Hot-Tempered Man" six weeks before the eclipse passed through Russia. The story includes a major section about the frustrations of a man who is trying to make a great variety of observations during the short interval of totality. In the story the eclipse date is given as 7 August 1887, as per the Julian Calendar then in use in Russia.

== Eclipse details ==
Shown below are two tables displaying details about this particular solar eclipse. The first table outlines times at which the Moon's penumbra or umbra attains the specific parameter, and the second table describes various other parameters pertaining to this eclipse.

August 19, 1887 Solar Eclipse Times
Event	Time (UTC)
First Penumbral External Contact	1887 August 19 at 03:05:23.2 UTC
First Umbral External Contact	1887 August 19 at 04:09:44.3 UTC
First Central Line	1887 August 19 at 04:11:03.8 UTC
First Umbral Internal Contact	1887 August 19 at 04:12:23.8 UTC
Equatorial Conjunction	1887 August 19 at 05:15:23.5 UTC
Greatest Duration	1887 August 19 at 05:31:45.2 UTC
Greatest Eclipse	1887 August 19 at 05:32:05.2 UTC
Ecliptic Conjunction	1887 August 19 at 05:38:34.1 UTC
Last Umbral Internal Contact	1887 August 19 at 06:51:56.7 UTC
Last Central Line	1887 August 19 at 06:53:18.3 UTC
Last Umbral External Contact	1887 August 19 at 06:54:39.5 UTC
Last Penumbral External Contact	1887 August 19 at 07:58:51.2 UTC

August 19, 1887 Solar Eclipse Parameters
Parameter	Value
Eclipse Magnitude	1.05176
Eclipse Obscuration	1.10619
Gamma	0.63124
Sun Right Ascension	09h52m33.6s
Sun Declination	+12°53'52.0"
Sun Semi-Diameter	15'48.5"
Sun Equatorial Horizontal Parallax	08.7"
Moon Right Ascension	09h53m11.8s
Moon Declination	+13°30'38.5"
Moon Semi-Diameter	16'24.8"
Moon Equatorial Horizontal Parallax	1°00'14.3"
ΔT	-6.0 s

== Eclipse season ==
This eclipse is part of an eclipse season, a period, roughly every six months, when eclipses occur. Only two (or occasionally three) eclipse seasons occur each year, and each season lasts about 35 days and repeats just short of six months (173 days) later; thus two full eclipse seasons always occur each year. Either two or three eclipses happen each eclipse season. In the sequence below, each eclipse is separated by a fortnight.

Eclipse season of August 1887
August 3 Descending node (full moon)	August 19 Ascending node (new moon)
Partial lunar eclipse Lunar Saros 117	Total solar eclipse Solar Saros 143

== Related eclipses ==
=== Eclipses in 1887 ===
- A partial lunar eclipse on February 8.
- An annular solar eclipse on February 22.
- A partial lunar eclipse on August 3.
- A total solar eclipse on August 19.

=== Metonic ===
- Preceded by: Solar eclipse of October 30, 1883
- Followed by: Solar eclipse of June 6, 1891

=== Tzolkinex ===
- Preceded by: Solar eclipse of July 7, 1880
- Followed by: Solar eclipse of September 29, 1894

=== Half-Saros ===
- Preceded by: Lunar eclipse of August 13, 1878
- Followed by: Lunar eclipse of August 23, 1896

=== Tritos ===
- Preceded by: Solar eclipse of September 17, 1876
- Followed by: Solar eclipse of July 18, 1898

=== Solar Saros 143 ===
- Preceded by: Solar eclipse of August 7, 1869
- Followed by: Solar eclipse of August 30, 1905

=== Inex ===
- Preceded by: Solar eclipse of September 7, 1858
- Followed by: Solar eclipse of July 30, 1916

=== Triad ===
- Preceded by: Solar eclipse of October 18, 1800
- Followed by: Solar eclipse of June 20, 1974

=== Solar eclipses of 1884–1888 ===
This eclipse is a member of a semester series. An eclipse in a semester series of solar eclipses repeats approximately every 177 days and 4 hours (a semester) at alternating nodes of the Moon's orbit.

The partial solar eclipses on April 25, 1884 and October 19, 1884 occur in the previous lunar year eclipse set, and the partial solar eclipse on July 9, 1888 occurs in the next lunar year eclipse set.

Solar eclipse series sets from 1884 to 1888
Descending node			Ascending node		
Saros	Map	Gamma	Saros	Map	Gamma
108	March 27, 1884 Partial	1.4602	113		
118	March 16, 1885 Annular	0.8030	123	September 8, 1885 Total	−0.8489
128	March 5, 1886 Annular	0.0970	133	August 29, 1886 Total	−0.1059
138	February 22, 1887 Annular	−0.6040	143	August 19, 1887 Total	0.6312
148	February 11, 1888 Partial	−1.2684	153	August 7, 1888 Partial	−1.2797

=== Saros 143 ===
This eclipse is a part of Saros series 143, repeating every 18 years, 11 days, and containing 72 events. The series started with a partial solar eclipse on March 7, 1617. It contains total eclipses from June 24, 1797 through October 24, 1995; hybrid eclipses from November 3, 2013 through December 6, 2067; and annular eclipses from December 16, 2085 through September 16, 2536. The series ends at member 72 as a partial eclipse on April 23, 2897. Its eclipses are tabulated in three columns; every third eclipse in the same column is one exeligmos apart, so they all cast shadows over approximately the same parts of the Earth.

The longest duration of totality was produced by member 16 at 3 minutes, 50 seconds on August 19, 1887, and the longest duration of annularity will be produced by member 51 at 4 minutes, 54 seconds on September 6, 2518. All eclipses in this series occur at the Moon’s ascending node of orbit.

Series members 12–33 occur between 1801 and 2200:
12	13	14
July 6, 1815	July 17, 1833	July 28, 1851
15	16	17
August 7, 1869	August 19, 1887	August 30, 1905
18	19	20
September 10, 1923	September 21, 1941	October 2, 1959
21	22	23
October 12, 1977	October 24, 1995	November 3, 2013
24	25	26
November 14, 2031	November 25, 2049	December 6, 2067
27	28	29
December 16, 2085	December 29, 2103	January 8, 2122
30	31	32
January 20, 2140	January 30, 2158	February 10, 2176
33
February 21, 2194

=== Metonic series ===
The metonic series repeats eclipses every 19 years (6939.69 days), lasting about 5 cycles. Eclipses occur in nearly the same calendar date. In addition, the octon subseries repeats 1/5 of that or every 3.8 years (1387.94 days). All eclipses in this table occur at the Moon's ascending node.

24 eclipse events between March 25, 1819 and August 20, 1906
March 25–26	January 11–12	October 30–31	August 18–20	June 6–7
107	109	111	113	115
March 25, 1819	January 12, 1823	October 31, 1826	August 18, 1830	June 7, 1834
117	119	121	123	125
March 25, 1838	January 11, 1842	October 30, 1845	August 18, 1849	June 6, 1853
127	129	131	133	135
March 25, 1857	January 11, 1861	October 30, 1864	August 18, 1868	June 6, 1872
137	139	141	143	145
March 25, 1876	January 11, 1880	October 30, 1883	August 19, 1887	June 6, 1891
147	149	151	153	
March 26, 1895	January 11, 1899	October 31, 1902	August 20, 1906	

=== Tritos series ===
This eclipse is a part of a tritos cycle, repeating at alternating nodes every 135 synodic months (≈ 3986.63 days, or 11 years minus 1 month). Their appearance and longitude are irregular due to a lack of synchronization with the anomalistic month (period of perigee), but groupings of 3 tritos cycles (≈ 33 years minus 3 months) come close (≈ 434.044 anomalistic months), so eclipses are similar in these groupings.

The partial solar eclipse on November 4, 2116 (part of Saros 164) is also a part of this series but is not included in the table below.

Series members between 1801 and 2029
March 24, 1811 (Saros 136)	February 21, 1822 (Saros 137)	January 20, 1833 (Saros 138)	December 21, 1843 (Saros 139)	November 20, 1854 (Saros 140)
October 19, 1865 (Saros 141)	September 17, 1876 (Saros 142)	August 19, 1887 (Saros 143)	July 18, 1898 (Saros 144)	June 17, 1909 (Saros 145)
May 18, 1920 (Saros 146)	April 18, 1931 (Saros 147)	March 16, 1942 (Saros 148)	February 14, 1953 (Saros 149)	January 14, 1964 (Saros 150)
December 13, 1974 (Saros 151)	November 12, 1985 (Saros 152)	October 12, 1996 (Saros 153)	September 11, 2007 (Saros 154)	August 11, 2018 (Saros 155)
July 11, 2029 (Saros 156)

=== Inex series ===
This eclipse is a part of the long period inex cycle, repeating at alternating nodes, every 358 synodic months (≈ 10,571.95 days, or 29 years minus 20 days). Their appearance and longitude are irregular due to a lack of synchronization with the anomalistic month (period of perigee). However, groupings of 3 inex cycles (≈ 87 years minus 2 months) comes close (≈ 1,151.02 anomalistic months), so eclipses are similar in these groupings.

Series members between 1801 and 2200
September 28, 1829 (Saros 141)	September 7, 1858 (Saros 142)	August 19, 1887 (Saros 143)
July 30, 1916 (Saros 144)	July 9, 1945 (Saros 145)	June 20, 1974 (Saros 146)
May 31, 2003 (Saros 147)	May 9, 2032 (Saros 148)	April 20, 2061 (Saros 149)
March 31, 2090 (Saros 150)	March 11, 2119 (Saros 151)	February 19, 2148 (Saros 152)
January 29, 2177 (Saros 153)		
