= Solar eclipse of January 22, 1879 =

Annular solar eclipse January 22, 1879

- Annular eclipse
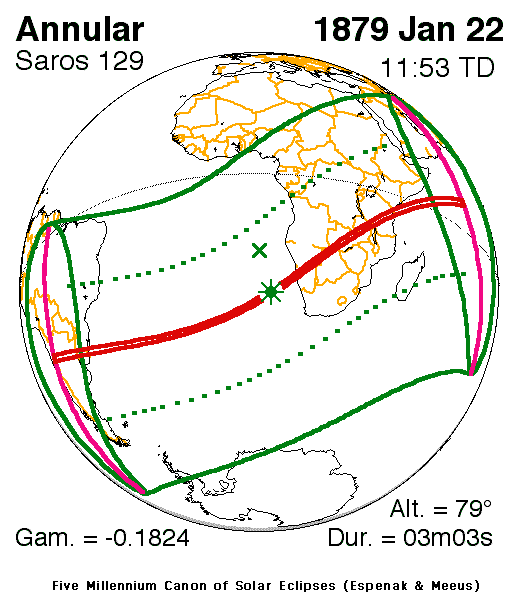
- Map
- Gamma: −0.1824
- Magnitude: 0.97

Maximum eclipse
- Duration: 183 s (3 min 3 s)
- Coordinates: 29.8°S 8.5°E
- Max. width of band: 110 km (68 mi)

Times (UTC)
- Greatest eclipse: 11:53:08

References
- Saros: 129 (44 of 80)
- Catalog # (SE5000): 9231

An annular solar eclipse occurred at the Moon's ascending node of orbit on Wednesday January 22, 1879, with a magnitude of 0.9700. A solar eclipse occurs when the Moon passes between Earth and the Sun, thereby totally or partly obscuring the image of the Sun for a viewer on Earth. An annular solar eclipse occurs when the Moon's apparent diameter is smaller than the Sun's, blocking most of the Sun's light and causing the Sun to look like an annulus (ring). An annular eclipse appears as a partial eclipse over a region of the Earth thousands of kilometres wide. The Moon's apparent diameter was near the average diameter because it occurred 8.1 days after perigee (on January 14, 1879, at 16:55 UTC) and 6.7 days before apogee (on January 29, 1879, at 5:10 UTC).

The path of annularity was visible from parts of modern-day Argentina, Uruguay, southern Brazil, Namibia, Botswana, Zambia, the southernmost Democratic Republic of the Congo, northern Malawi, and Tanzania. A partial solar eclipse was also visible for parts of South America, Antarctica, Africa, and the Middle East.

== Observations ==
On 22 January 1879, three battles were fought in the Anglo-Zulu War. During the Battle of Isandlwana, in which 1,300 British and over 1,000 Zulus were killed, at 2:29 PM there was a solar eclipse, and according to legend, this motivated the Zulus, who claimed that it was a sign that they would prevail. The Zulu name for the battle translates as "the day of the dead moon".

== Eclipse details ==
Shown below are two tables displaying details about this particular solar eclipse. The first table outlines times at which the Moon's penumbra or umbra attains the specific parameter, and the second table describes various other parameters pertaining to this eclipse.

January 22, 1879 Solar Eclipse Times
| Event | Time (UTC) |
|---|---|
| First Penumbral External Contact | 1879 January 22 at 08:59:48.6 UTC |
| First Umbral External Contact | 1879 January 22 at 10:01:38.5 UTC |
| First Central Line | 1879 January 22 at 10:03:06.2 UTC |
| First Umbral Internal Contact | 1879 January 22 at 10:04:33.9 UTC |
| First Penumbral Internal Contact | 1879 January 22 at 11:08:22.0 UTC |
| Greatest Duration | 1879 January 22 at 11:31:00.1 UTC |
| Equatorial Conjunction | 1879 January 22 at 11:46:12.9 UTC |
| Ecliptic Conjunction | 1879 January 22 at 11:51:05.4 UTC |
| Greatest Eclipse | 1879 January 22 at 11:53:08.0 UTC |
| Last Penumbral Internal Contact | 1879 January 22 at 12:38:03.0 UTC |
| Last Umbral Internal Contact | 1879 January 22 at 13:41:44.5 UTC |
| Last Central Line | 1879 January 22 at 13:43:15.1 UTC |
| Last Umbral External Contact | 1879 January 22 at 13:44:45.8 UTC |
| Last Penumbral External Contact | 1879 January 22 at 14:46:36.9 UTC |

January 22, 1879 Solar Eclipse Parameters
| Parameter | Value |
|---|---|
| Eclipse Magnitude | 0.97002 |
| Eclipse Obscuration | 0.94094 |
| Gamma | −0.18240 |
| Sun Right Ascension | 20h17m38.7s |
| Sun Declination | -19°41'46.4" |
| Sun Semi-Diameter | 16'14.9" |
| Sun Equatorial Horizontal Parallax | 08.9" |
| Moon Right Ascension | 20h17m52.8s |
| Moon Declination | -19°51'35.0" |
| Moon Semi-Diameter | 15'31.0" |
| Moon Equatorial Horizontal Parallax | 0°56'56.8" |
| ΔT | -4.9 s |

== Eclipse season ==
This eclipse is part of an eclipse season, a period, roughly every six months, when eclipses occur. Only two (or occasionally three) eclipse seasons occur each year, and each season lasts about 35 days and repeats just short of six months (173 days) later; thus two full eclipse seasons always occur each year. Either two or three eclipses happen each eclipse season. In the sequence below, each eclipse is separated by a fortnight. The first and last eclipse in this sequence is separated by one synodic month.

Eclipse season of January–February 1879
| January 8 Descending node (full moon) | January 22 Ascending node (new moon) | February 7 Descending node (full moon) |
|---|---|---|
| Penumbral lunar eclipse Lunar Saros 103 | Annular solar eclipse Solar Saros 129 | Penumbral lunar eclipse Lunar Saros 141 |

== Related eclipses ==
=== Eclipses in 1879 ===
- A penumbral lunar eclipse on January 8.
- An annular solar eclipse on January 22.
- A penumbral lunar eclipse on February 7.
- A penumbral lunar eclipse on July 3.
- An annular solar eclipse on July 19.
- A penumbral lunar eclipse on August 2.
- A partial lunar eclipse on December 28.

=== Metonic ===
- Preceded by: Solar eclipse of April 6, 1875
- Followed by: Solar eclipse of November 10, 1882

=== Tzolkinex ===
- Preceded by: Solar eclipse of December 12, 1871
- Followed by: Solar eclipse of March 5, 1886

=== Half-Saros ===
- Preceded by: Lunar eclipse of January 17, 1870
- Followed by: Lunar eclipse of January 28, 1888

=== Tritos ===
- Preceded by: Solar eclipse of February 23, 1868
- Followed by: Solar eclipse of December 22, 1889

=== Solar Saros 129 ===
- Preceded by: Solar eclipse of January 11, 1861
- Followed by: Solar eclipse of February 1, 1897

=== Inex ===
- Preceded by: Solar eclipse of February 12, 1850
- Followed by: Solar eclipse of January 3, 1908

=== Triad ===
- Preceded by: Solar eclipse of March 22, 1792
- Followed by: Solar eclipse of November 23, 1965

=== Solar eclipses of 1877–1880 ===
This eclipse is a member of a semester series. An eclipse in a semester series of solar eclipses repeats approximately every 177 days and 4 hours (a semester) at alternating nodes of the Moon's orbit.

The partial solar eclipses on March 15, 1877 and September 7, 1877 occur in the previous lunar year eclipse set, and the partial solar eclipse on December 2, 1880 occurs in the next lunar year eclipse set.

Solar eclipse series sets from 1877 to 1880
| Descending node | | | Ascending node | | |
| Saros | Map | Gamma | Saros | Map | Gamma |
| 114 | August 9, 1877 Partial | 1.3277 | 119 | February 2, 1878 Annular | −0.9071 |
| 124 | July 29, 1878 Total | 0.6232 | 129 | January 22, 1879 Annular | −0.1824 |
| 134 | July 19, 1879 Annular | −0.1439 | 139 | January 11, 1880 Total | 0.6136 |
| 144 | July 7, 1880 Annular | −0.9406 | 146 | December 31, 1880 Partial | 1.1591 |

=== Saros 129 ===
This eclipse is a part of Saros series 129, repeating every 18 years, 11 days, and containing 80 events. The series started with a partial solar eclipse on October 3, 1103. It contains annular eclipses from May 6, 1464 through March 18, 1969; hybrid eclipses from March 29, 1987 through April 20, 2023; and total eclipses from April 30, 2041 through July 26, 2185. The series ends at member 80 as a partial eclipse on February 21, 2528. Its eclipses are tabulated in three columns; every third eclipse in the same column is one exeligmos apart, so they all cast shadows over approximately the same parts of the Earth.

The longest duration of annularity was produced by member 34 at 5 minutes, 10 seconds on October 4, 1698, and the longest duration of totality will be produced by member 58 at 3 minutes, 43 seconds on June 25, 2131. All eclipses in this series occur at the Moon’s ascending node of orbit.

Series members 40–61 occur between 1801 and 2200:
| 40 | 41 | 42 |
|---|---|---|
| December 10, 1806 | December 20, 1824 | December 31, 1842 |
| 43 | 44 | 45 |
| January 11, 1861 | January 22, 1879 | February 1, 1897 |
| 46 | 47 | 48 |
| February 14, 1915 | February 24, 1933 | March 7, 1951 |
| 49 | 50 | 51 |
| March 18, 1969 | March 29, 1987 | April 8, 2005 |
| 52 | 53 | 54 |
| April 20, 2023 | April 30, 2041 | May 11, 2059 |
| 55 | 56 | 57 |
| May 22, 2077 | June 2, 2095 | June 13, 2113 |
| 58 | 59 | 60 |
| June 25, 2131 | July 5, 2149 | July 16, 2167 |
61
July 26, 2185

=== Metonic series ===
The metonic series repeats eclipses every 19 years (6939.69 days), lasting about 5 cycles. Eclipses occur in nearly the same calendar date. In addition, the octon subseries repeats 1/5 of that or every 3.8 years (1387.94 days). All eclipses in this table occur at the Moon's ascending node.

25 eclipse events between April 5, 1837 and June 17, 1928
| April 5–6 | January 22–23 | November 10–11 | August 28–30 | June 17–18 |
| 107 | 109 | 111 | 113 | 115 |
|---|---|---|---|---|
| April 5, 1837 | January 22, 1841 | November 10, 1844 | August 28, 1848 | June 17, 1852 |
| 117 | 119 | 121 | 123 | 125 |
| April 5, 1856 | January 23, 1860 | November 11, 1863 | August 29, 1867 | June 18, 1871 |
| 127 | 129 | 131 | 133 | 135 |
| April 6, 1875 | January 22, 1879 | November 10, 1882 | August 29, 1886 | June 17, 1890 |
| 137 | 139 | 141 | 143 | 145 |
| April 6, 1894 | January 22, 1898 | November 11, 1901 | August 30, 1905 | June 17, 1909 |
| 147 | 149 | 151 | 153 | 155 |
| April 6, 1913 | January 23, 1917 | November 10, 1920 | August 30, 1924 | June 17, 1928 |

=== Tritos series ===
This eclipse is a part of a tritos cycle, repeating at alternating nodes every 135 synodic months (≈ 3986.63 days, or 11 years minus 1 month). Their appearance and longitude are irregular due to a lack of synchronization with the anomalistic month (period of perigee), but groupings of 3 tritos cycles (≈ 33 years minus 3 months) come close (≈ 434.044 anomalistic months), so eclipses are similar in these groupings.

Series members between 1801 and 2200
| August 28, 1802 (Saros 122) | July 27, 1813 (Saros 123) | June 26, 1824 (Saros 124) | May 27, 1835 (Saros 125) | April 25, 1846 (Saros 126) |
| March 25, 1857 (Saros 127) | February 23, 1868 (Saros 128) | January 22, 1879 (Saros 129) | December 22, 1889 (Saros 130) | November 22, 1900 (Saros 131) |
| October 22, 1911 (Saros 132) | September 21, 1922 (Saros 133) | August 21, 1933 (Saros 134) | July 20, 1944 (Saros 135) | June 20, 1955 (Saros 136) |
| May 20, 1966 (Saros 137) | April 18, 1977 (Saros 138) | March 18, 1988 (Saros 139) | February 16, 1999 (Saros 140) | January 15, 2010 (Saros 141) |
| December 14, 2020 (Saros 142) | November 14, 2031 (Saros 143) | October 14, 2042 (Saros 144) | September 12, 2053 (Saros 145) | August 12, 2064 (Saros 146) |
| July 13, 2075 (Saros 147) | June 11, 2086 (Saros 148) | May 11, 2097 (Saros 149) | April 11, 2108 (Saros 150) | March 11, 2119 (Saros 151) |
| February 8, 2130 (Saros 152) | January 8, 2141 (Saros 153) | December 8, 2151 (Saros 154) | November 7, 2162 (Saros 155) | October 7, 2173 (Saros 156) |
| September 4, 2184 (Saros 157) | August 5, 2195 (Saros 158) | | | |

=== Inex series ===
This eclipse is a part of the long period inex cycle, repeating at alternating nodes, every 358 synodic months (≈ 10,571.95 days, or 29 years minus 20 days). Their appearance and longitude are irregular due to a lack of synchronization with the anomalistic month (period of perigee). However, groupings of 3 inex cycles (≈ 87 years minus 2 months) comes close (≈ 1,151.02 anomalistic months), so eclipses are similar in these groupings.

Series members between 1801 and 2200
| March 4, 1821 (Saros 127) | February 12, 1850 (Saros 128) | January 22, 1879 (Saros 129) |
| January 3, 1908 (Saros 130) | December 13, 1936 (Saros 131) | November 23, 1965 (Saros 132) |
| November 3, 1994 (Saros 133) | October 14, 2023 (Saros 134) | September 22, 2052 (Saros 135) |
| September 3, 2081 (Saros 136) | August 15, 2110 (Saros 137) | July 25, 2139 (Saros 138) |
| July 5, 2168 (Saros 139) | June 15, 2197 (Saros 140) | |
