= Solar eclipse of October 31, 1902 =

20th-century partial solar eclipse

- Partial eclipse
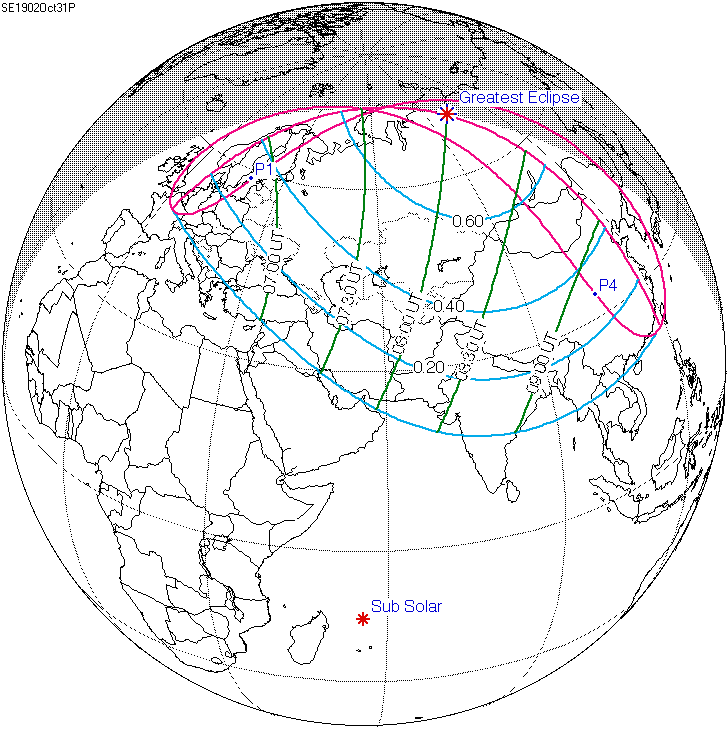
- Map
- Gamma: 1.1556
- Magnitude: 0.696

Maximum eclipse
- Coordinates: 70.8°N 100.8°E

Times (UTC)
- Greatest eclipse: 8:00:18

References
- Saros: 151 (8 of 72)
- Catalog # (SE5000): 9287

A partial solar eclipse occurred at the Moon's ascending node of orbit on Friday, October 31, 1902, with a magnitude of 0.696. A solar eclipse occurs when the Moon passes between Earth and the Sun, thereby totally or partly obscuring the image of the Sun for a viewer on Earth. A partial solar eclipse occurs in the polar regions of the Earth when the center of the Moon's shadow misses the Earth.

A partial eclipse was visible for parts of Northern Europe, Eastern Europe, the northern Middle East, South Asia, East Asia, and North Asia.

== Eclipse details ==
Shown below are two tables displaying details about this particular solar eclipse. The first table outlines times at which the Moon's penumbra or umbra attains the specific parameter, and the second table describes various other parameters pertaining to this eclipse.

October 31, 1902 Solar Eclipse Times
| Event | Time (UTC) |
|---|---|
| First Penumbral External Contact | 1902 October 31 at 05:58:33.8 UTC |
| Equatorial Conjunction | 1902 October 31 at 07:28:17.6 UTC |
| Greatest Eclipse | 1902 October 31 at 08:00:17.5 UTC |
| Ecliptic Conjunction | 1902 October 31 at 08:13:32.8 UTC |
| Last Penumbral External Contact | 1902 October 31 at 10:02:20.8 UTC |

October 31, 1902 Solar Eclipse Parameters
| Parameter | Value |
|---|---|
| Eclipse Magnitude | 0.69599 |
| Eclipse Obscuration | 0.60451 |
| Gamma | 1.15559 |
| Sun Right Ascension | 14h18m29.8s |
| Sun Declination | -13°50'43.3" |
| Sun Semi-Diameter | 16'06.8" |
| Sun Equatorial Horizontal Parallax | 08.9" |
| Moon Right Ascension | 14h19m30.7s |
| Moon Declination | -12°48'43.6" |
| Moon Semi-Diameter | 15'04.1" |
| Moon Equatorial Horizontal Parallax | 0°55'18.1" |
| ΔT | 1.0 s |

== Eclipse season ==
This eclipse is part of an eclipse season, a period, roughly every six months, when eclipses occur. Only two (or occasionally three) eclipse seasons occur each year, and each season lasts about 35 days and repeats just short of six months (173 days) later; thus two full eclipse seasons always occur each year. Either two or three eclipses happen each eclipse season. In the sequence below, each eclipse is separated by a fortnight.

Eclipse season of October 1902
| October 17 Descending node (full moon) | October 31 Ascending node (new moon) |
|---|---|
| Total lunar eclipse Lunar Saros 125 | Partial solar eclipse Solar Saros 151 |

== Related eclipses ==
=== Eclipses in 1902 ===
- A partial solar eclipse on April 8.
- A total lunar eclipse on April 22.
- A partial solar eclipse on May 7.
- A total lunar eclipse on October 17.
- A partial solar eclipse on October 31.

=== Metonic ===
- Preceded by: Solar eclipse of January 11, 1899
- Followed by: Solar eclipse of August 20, 1906

=== Tzolkinex ===
- Preceded by: Solar eclipse of September 18, 1895
- Followed by: Solar eclipse of December 12, 1909

=== Half-Saros ===
- Preceded by: Lunar eclipse of October 25, 1893
- Followed by: Lunar eclipse of November 6, 1911

=== Tritos ===
- Preceded by: Solar eclipse of December 1, 1891
- Followed by: Solar eclipse of September 30, 1913

=== Solar Saros 151 ===
- Preceded by: Solar eclipse of October 19, 1884
- Followed by: Solar eclipse of November 10, 1920

=== Inex ===
- Preceded by: Solar eclipse of November 20, 1873
- Followed by: Solar eclipse of October 11, 1931

=== Triad ===
- Preceded by: Solar eclipse of December 30, 1815
- Followed by: Solar eclipse of August 31, 1989

=== Solar eclipses of 1898–1902 ===
This eclipse is a member of a semester series. An eclipse in a semester series of solar eclipses repeats approximately every 177 days and 4 hours (a semester) at alternating nodes of the Moon's orbit.

The solar eclipses on January 22, 1898 (total) and July 18, 1898 (annular) occur in the previous lunar year eclipse set, and the partial solar eclipse on April 8, 1902 occurs in the next lunar year eclipse set.

Solar eclipse series sets from 1898 to 1902
| Ascending node | | | Descending node | | |
| Saros | Map | Gamma | Saros | Map | Gamma |
| 111 | December 13, 1898 Partial | −1.5252 | 116 | June 8, 1899 Partial | 1.2089 |
| 121 | December 3, 1899 Annular | −0.9061 | 126 Totality in Wadesboro, North Carolina | May 28, 1900 Total | 0.3943 |
| 131 | November 22, 1900 Annular | −0.2245 | 136 | May 18, 1901 Total | −0.3626 |
| 141 | November 11, 1901 Annular | 0.4758 | 146 | May 7, 1902 Partial | −1.0831 |
| 151 | October 31, 1902 Partial | 1.1556 | | | |

=== Saros 151 ===
This eclipse is a part of Saros series 151, repeating every 18 years, 11 days, and containing 72 events. The series started with a partial solar eclipse on August 14, 1776. It contains annular eclipses from February 28, 2101 through April 23, 2191; a hybrid eclipse on May 5, 2209; and total eclipses from May 16, 2227 through July 6, 2912. The series ends at member 72 as a partial eclipse on October 1, 3056. Its eclipses are tabulated in three columns; every third eclipse in the same column is one exeligmos apart, so they all cast shadows over approximately the same parts of the Earth.

The longest duration of annularity will be produced by member 19 at 2 minutes, 44 seconds on February 28, 2101, and the longest duration of totality will be produced by member 60 at 5 minutes, 41 seconds on May 22, 2840. All eclipses in this series occur at the Moon’s ascending node of orbit.

Series members 3–24 occur between 1801 and 2200:
| 3 | 4 | 5 |
|---|---|---|
| September 5, 1812 | September 17, 1830 | September 27, 1848 |
| 6 | 7 | 8 |
| October 8, 1866 | October 19, 1884 | October 31, 1902 |
| 9 | 10 | 11 |
| November 10, 1920 | November 21, 1938 | December 2, 1956 |
| 12 | 13 | 14 |
| December 13, 1974 | December 24, 1992 | January 4, 2011 |
| 15 | 16 | 17 |
| January 14, 2029 | January 26, 2047 | February 5, 2065 |
| 18 | 19 | 20 |
| February 16, 2083 | February 28, 2101 | March 11, 2119 |
| 21 | 22 | 23 |
| March 21, 2137 | April 2, 2155 | April 12, 2173 |
24
April 23, 2191

=== Metonic series ===
The metonic series repeats eclipses every 19 years (6939.69 days), lasting about 5 cycles. Eclipses occur in nearly the same calendar date. In addition, the octon subseries repeats 1/5 of that or every 3.8 years (1387.94 days). All eclipses in this table occur at the Moon's ascending node.

24 eclipse events between March 25, 1819 and August 20, 1906
| March 25–26 | January 11–12 | October 30–31 | August 18–20 | June 6–7 |
| 107 | 109 | 111 | 113 | 115 |
|---|---|---|---|---|
| March 25, 1819 | January 12, 1823 | October 31, 1826 | August 18, 1830 | June 7, 1834 |
| 117 | 119 | 121 | 123 | 125 |
| March 25, 1838 | January 11, 1842 | October 30, 1845 | August 18, 1849 | June 6, 1853 |
| 127 | 129 | 131 | 133 | 135 |
| March 25, 1857 | January 11, 1861 | October 30, 1864 | August 18, 1868 | June 6, 1872 |
| 137 | 139 | 141 | 143 | 145 |
| March 25, 1876 | January 11, 1880 | October 30, 1883 | August 19, 1887 | June 6, 1891 |
| 147 | 149 | 151 | 153 | |
| March 26, 1895 | January 11, 1899 | October 31, 1902 | August 20, 1906 | |

=== Tritos series ===
This eclipse is a part of a tritos cycle, repeating at alternating nodes every 135 synodic months (≈ 3986.63 days, or 11 years minus 1 month). Their appearance and longitude are irregular due to a lack of synchronization with the anomalistic month (period of perigee), but groupings of 3 tritos cycles (≈ 33 years minus 3 months) come close (≈ 434.044 anomalistic months), so eclipses are similar in these groupings.

Series members between 1801 and 1946
| August 5, 1804 (Saros 142) | July 6, 1815 (Saros 143) | June 5, 1826 (Saros 144) | May 4, 1837 (Saros 145) | April 3, 1848 (Saros 146) |
| March 4, 1859 (Saros 147) | January 31, 1870 (Saros 148) | December 31, 1880 (Saros 149) | December 1, 1891 (Saros 150) | October 31, 1902 (Saros 151) |
| September 30, 1913 (Saros 152) | August 30, 1924 (Saros 153) | July 30, 1935 (Saros 154) | June 29, 1946 (Saros 155) | |

=== Inex series ===
This eclipse is a part of the long period inex cycle, repeating at alternating nodes, every 358 synodic months (≈ 10,571.95 days, or 29 years minus 20 days). Their appearance and longitude are irregular due to a lack of synchronization with the anomalistic month (period of perigee). However, groupings of 3 inex cycles (≈ 87 years minus 2 months) comes close (≈ 1,151.02 anomalistic months), so eclipses are similar in these groupings.

Series members between 1801 and 2200
| December 30, 1815 (Saros 148) | December 9, 1844 (Saros 149) | November 20, 1873 (Saros 150) |
| October 31, 1902 (Saros 151) | October 11, 1931 (Saros 152) | September 20, 1960 (Saros 153) |
| August 31, 1989 (Saros 154) | August 11, 2018 (Saros 155) | July 22, 2047 (Saros 156) |
| July 1, 2076 (Saros 157) | June 12, 2105 (Saros 158) | May 23, 2134 (Saros 159) |
| | April 12, 2192 (Saros 161) | |
