= Solar eclipse of July 21, 1906 =

20th-century partial solar eclipse

- Partial eclipse
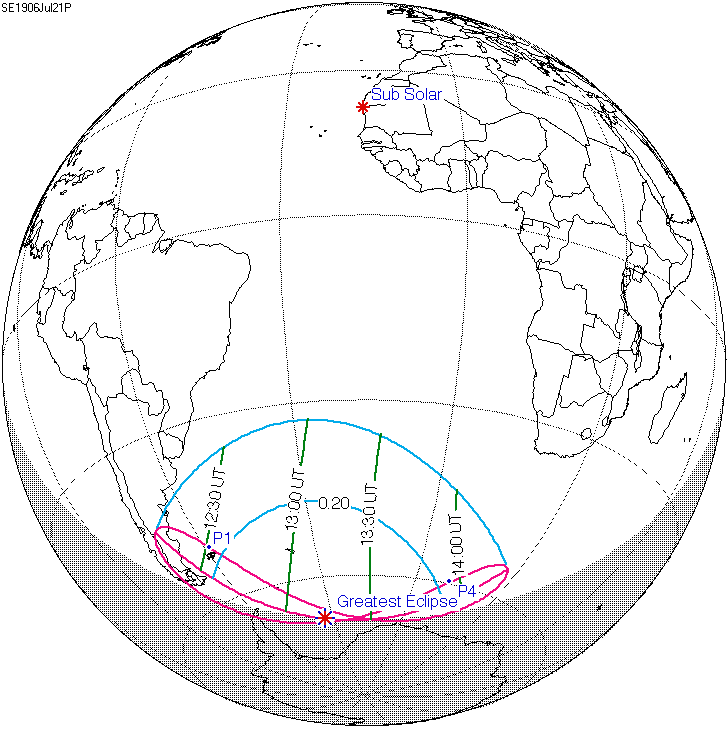
- Map
- Gamma: −1.3637
- Magnitude: 0.3355

Maximum eclipse
- Coordinates: 68.6°S 33.3°W

Times (UTC)
- Greatest eclipse: 13:14:19

References
- Saros: 115 (70 of 72)
- Catalog # (SE5000): 9296

A partial solar eclipse occurred at the Moon's ascending node of orbit on Saturday, July 21, 1906, with a magnitude of 0.3355. A solar eclipse occurs when the Moon passes between Earth and the Sun, thereby totally or partly obscuring the image of the Sun for a viewer on Earth. A partial solar eclipse occurs in the polar regions of the Earth when the center of the Moon's shadow misses the Earth.

A partial eclipse was visible for parts of Argentina and Chile.

== Eclipse details ==
Shown below are two tables displaying details about this particular solar eclipse. The first table outlines times at which the Moon's penumbra or umbra attains the specific parameter, and the second table describes various other parameters pertaining to this eclipse.

July 21, 1906 Solar Eclipse Times
Event	Time (UTC)
First Penumbral External Contact	1906 July 21 at 11:48:29.5 UTC
Ecliptic Conjunction	1906 July 21 at 12:59:01.1 UTC
Greatest Eclipse	1906 July 21 at 13:14:19.0 UTC
Equatorial Conjunction	1906 July 21 at 13:30:23.7 UTC
Last Penumbral External Contact	1906 July 21 at 14:39:56.8 UTC

July 21, 1906 Solar Eclipse Parameters
Parameter	Value
Eclipse Magnitude	0.33551
Eclipse Obscuration	0.21869
Gamma	−1.36368
Sun Right Ascension	07h59m42.4s
Sun Declination	+20°36'09.7"
Sun Semi-Diameter	15'44.5"
Sun Equatorial Horizontal Parallax	08.7"
Moon Right Ascension	07h59m09.6s
Moon Declination	+19°20'59.5"
Moon Semi-Diameter	15'08.2"
Moon Equatorial Horizontal Parallax	0°55'33.2"
ΔT	5.8 s

== Eclipse season ==
This eclipse is part of an eclipse season, a period, roughly every six months, when eclipses occur. Only two (or occasionally three) eclipse seasons occur each year, and each season lasts about 35 days and repeats just short of six months (173 days) later; thus two full eclipse seasons always occur each year. Either two or three eclipses happen each eclipse season. In the sequence below, each eclipse is separated by a fortnight. The first and last eclipse in this sequence is separated by one synodic month.

Eclipse season of July−August 1906
July 21 Ascending node (new moon)	August 4 Descending node (full moon)	August 20 Ascending node (new moon)
Partial solar eclipse Solar Saros 115	Total lunar eclipse Lunar Saros 127	Partial solar eclipse Solar Saros 153

== Related eclipses ==
=== Eclipses in 1906 ===
- A total lunar eclipse on February 9.
- A partial solar eclipse on February 23.
- A partial solar eclipse on July 21.
- A total lunar eclipse on August 4.
- A partial solar eclipse on August 20.

=== Metonic ===
- Followed by: Solar eclipse of May 9, 1910

=== Tzolkinex ===
- Preceded by: Solar eclipse of June 8, 1899
- Followed by: Solar eclipse of August 31, 1913

=== Half-Saros ===
- Preceded by: Lunar eclipse of July 14, 1897
- Followed by: Lunar eclipse of July 26, 1915

=== Tritos ===
- Preceded by: Solar eclipse of August 20, 1895
- Followed by: Solar eclipse of June 19, 1917

=== Solar Saros 115 ===
- Preceded by: Solar eclipse of July 9, 1888
- Followed by: Solar eclipse of July 31, 1924

=== Inex ===
- Preceded by: Solar eclipse of August 9, 1877
- Followed by: Solar eclipse of June 30, 1935

=== Triad ===
- Preceded by: Solar eclipse of September 19, 1819
- Followed by: Solar eclipse of May 21, 1993

=== Solar eclipses of 1906–1909 ===
This eclipse is a member of a semester series. An eclipse in a semester series of solar eclipses repeats approximately every 177 days and 4 hours (a semester) at alternating nodes of the Moon's orbit.

The partial solar eclipses on February 23, 1906 and August 20, 1906 occur in the previous lunar year eclipse set.

Solar eclipse series sets from 1906 to 1909
Ascending node			Descending node		
Saros	Map	Gamma	Saros	Map	Gamma
115	July 21, 1906 Partial	−1.3637	120	January 14, 1907 Total	0.8628
125	July 10, 1907 Annular	−0.6313	130	January 3, 1908 Total	0.1934
135	June 28, 1908 Annular	0.1389	140	December 23, 1908 Hybrid	−0.4985
145	June 17, 1909 Hybrid	0.8957	150	December 12, 1909 Partial	−1.2456

=== Saros 115 ===
This eclipse is a part of Saros series 115, repeating every 18 years, 11 days, and containing 72 events. The series started with a partial solar eclipse on June 21, 662 AD. It contains total eclipses from October 7, 842 AD through November 2, 1491; hybrid eclipses from November 12, 1509 through December 15, 1563; and annular eclipses from December 25, 1581 through May 27, 1816. The series ends at member 72 as a partial eclipse on August 12, 1942. Its eclipses are tabulated in three columns; every third eclipse in the same column is one exeligmos apart, so they all cast shadows over approximately the same parts of the Earth.

The longest duration of totality was produced by member 36 at 6 minutes, 24 seconds on July 5, 1293, and the longest duration of annularity was produced by member 65 at 1 minutes, 54 seconds on May 27, 1816. All eclipses in this series occur at the Moon’s ascending node of orbit.

Series members 65–72 occur between 1801 and 1942:
65	66	67
May 27, 1816	June 7, 1834	June 17, 1852
68	69	70
June 28, 1870	July 9, 1888	July 21, 1906
71	72	
July 31, 1924	August 12, 1942	

=== Metonic series ===
The metonic series repeats eclipses every 19 years (6939.69 days), lasting about 5 cycles. Eclipses occur in nearly the same calendar date. In addition, the octon subseries repeats 1/5 of that or every 3.8 years (1387.94 days). All eclipses in this table occur at the Moon's ascending node.

22 eclipse events between December 13, 1898 and July 20, 1982
December 13–14	October 1–2	July 20–21	May 9	February 24–25
111	113	115	117	119
December 13, 1898		July 21, 1906	May 9, 1910	February 25, 1914
121	123	125	127	129
December 14, 1917	October 1, 1921	July 20, 1925	May 9, 1929	February 24, 1933
131	133	135	137	139
December 13, 1936	October 1, 1940	July 20, 1944	May 9, 1948	February 25, 1952
141	143	145	147	149
December 14, 1955	October 2, 1959	July 20, 1963	May 9, 1967	February 25, 1971
151	153	155		
December 13, 1974	October 2, 1978	July 20, 1982		

=== Tritos series ===
This eclipse is a part of a tritos cycle, repeating at alternating nodes every 135 synodic months (≈ 3986.63 days, or 11 years minus 1 month). Their appearance and longitude are irregular due to a lack of synchronization with the anomalistic month (period of perigee), but groupings of 3 tritos cycles (≈ 33 years minus 3 months) come close (≈ 434.044 anomalistic months), so eclipses are similar in these groupings.

Series members between 1801 and 2200
March 25, 1819 (Saros 107)	February 23, 1830 (Saros 108)	January 22, 1841 (Saros 109)		November 21, 1862 (Saros 111)
		August 20, 1895 (Saros 114)	July 21, 1906 (Saros 115)	June 19, 1917 (Saros 116)
May 19, 1928 (Saros 117)	April 19, 1939 (Saros 118)	March 18, 1950 (Saros 119)	February 15, 1961 (Saros 120)	January 16, 1972 (Saros 121)
December 15, 1982 (Saros 122)	November 13, 1993 (Saros 123)	October 14, 2004 (Saros 124)	September 13, 2015 (Saros 125)	August 12, 2026 (Saros 126)
July 13, 2037 (Saros 127)	June 11, 2048 (Saros 128)	May 11, 2059 (Saros 129)	April 11, 2070 (Saros 130)	March 10, 2081 (Saros 131)
February 7, 2092 (Saros 132)	January 8, 2103 (Saros 133)	December 8, 2113 (Saros 134)	November 6, 2124 (Saros 135)	October 7, 2135 (Saros 136)
September 6, 2146 (Saros 137)	August 5, 2157 (Saros 138)	July 5, 2168 (Saros 139)	June 5, 2179 (Saros 140)	May 4, 2190 (Saros 141)

=== Inex series ===
This eclipse is a part of the long period inex cycle, repeating at alternating nodes, every 358 synodic months (≈ 10,571.95 days, or 29 years minus 20 days). Their appearance and longitude are irregular due to a lack of synchronization with the anomalistic month (period of perigee). However, groupings of 3 inex cycles (≈ 87 years minus 2 months) comes close (≈ 1,151.02 anomalistic months), so eclipses are similar in these groupings.

Series members between 1801 and 2200
September 19, 1819 (Saros 112)	August 28, 1848 (Saros 113)	August 9, 1877 (Saros 114)
July 21, 1906 (Saros 115)	June 30, 1935 (Saros 116)	June 10, 1964 (Saros 117)
May 21, 1993 (Saros 118)	April 30, 2022 (Saros 119)	April 11, 2051 (Saros 120)
March 21, 2080 (Saros 121)	March 1, 2109 (Saros 122)	February 9, 2138 (Saros 123)
January 21, 2167 (Saros 124)	December 31, 2195 (Saros 125)	
