= Solar eclipse of May 7, 1902 =

20th-century partial solar eclipse

- Partial eclipse
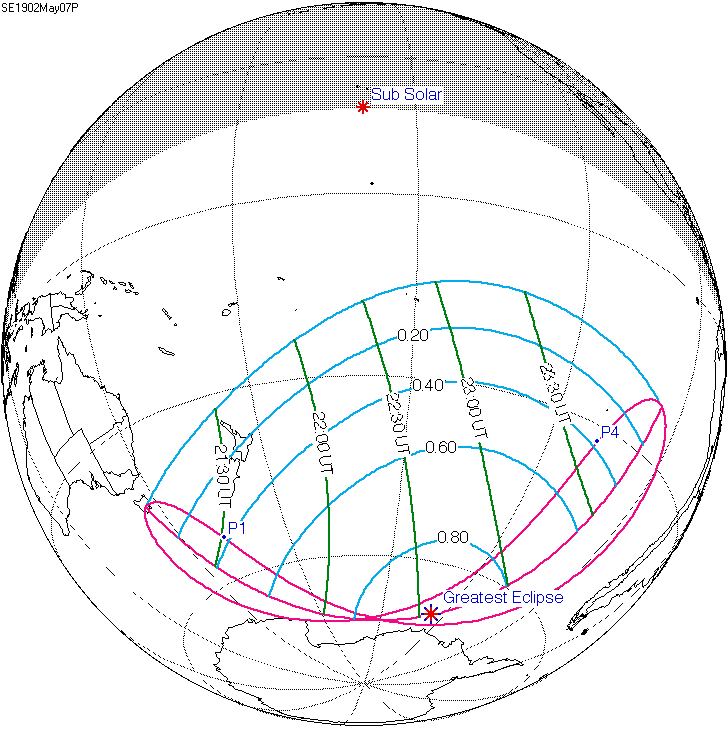
- Map
- Gamma: −1.0831
- Magnitude: 0.8593

Maximum eclipse
- Coordinates: 70°S 125.1°W

Times (UTC)
- Greatest eclipse: 22:34:16

References
- Saros: 146 (21 of 76)
- Catalog # (SE5000): 9285

A partial solar eclipse occurred at the Moon's descending node of orbit between Wednesday, May 7 and Thursday, May 8, 1902, with a magnitude of 0.8593. A solar eclipse occurs when the Moon passes between Earth and the Sun, thereby totally or partly obscuring the image of the Sun for a viewer on Earth. A partial solar eclipse occurs in the polar regions of the Earth when the center of the Moon's shadow misses the Earth.

A partial eclipse was visible for parts of Eastern Oceania.

== Eclipse details ==
Shown below are two tables displaying details about this particular solar eclipse. The first table outlines times at which the Moon's penumbra or umbra attains the specific parameter, and the second table describes various other parameters pertaining to this eclipse.

May 7, 1902 Solar Eclipse Times
Event	Time (UTC)
First Penumbral External Contact	1902 May 7 at 20:42:22.9 UTC
Equatorial Conjunction	1902 May 7 at 22:12:11.6 UTC
Greatest Eclipse	1902 May 7 at 22:34:16.0 UTC
Ecliptic Conjunction	1902 May 7 at 22:45:02.7 UTC
Last Penumbral External Contact	1902 May 8 at 00:26:17.3 UTC

May 7, 1902 Solar Eclipse Parameters
Parameter	Value
Eclipse Magnitude	0.85935
Eclipse Obscuration	0.83335
Gamma	−1.08306
Sun Right Ascension	02h55m45.5s
Sun Declination	+16°45'05.4"
Sun Semi-Diameter	15'50.6"
Sun Equatorial Horizontal Parallax	08.7"
Moon Right Ascension	02h56m38.5s
Moon Declination	+15°40'22.1"
Moon Semi-Diameter	16'38.0"
Moon Equatorial Horizontal Parallax	1°01'02.8"
ΔT	0.4 s

== Eclipse season ==
This eclipse is part of an eclipse season, a period, roughly every six months, when eclipses occur. Only two (or occasionally three) eclipse seasons occur each year, and each season lasts about 35 days and repeats just short of six months (173 days) later; thus two full eclipse seasons always occur each year. Either two or three eclipses happen each eclipse season. In the sequence below, each eclipse is separated by a fortnight. The first and last eclipse in this sequence is separated by one synodic month.

Eclipse season of April–May 1902
April 8 Descending node (new moon)	April 22 Ascending node (full moon)	May 7 Descending node (new moon)
Partial solar eclipse Solar Saros 108	Total lunar eclipse Lunar Saros 120	Partial solar eclipse Solar Saros 146

== Related eclipses ==
=== Eclipses in 1902 ===
- A partial solar eclipse on April 8.
- A total lunar eclipse on April 22.
- A partial solar eclipse on May 7.
- A total lunar eclipse on October 17.
- A partial solar eclipse on October 31.

=== Metonic ===
- Preceded by: Solar eclipse of July 18, 1898
- Followed by: Solar eclipse of February 23, 1906

=== Tzolkinex ===
- Preceded by: Solar eclipse of March 26, 1895
- Followed by: Solar eclipse of June 17, 1909

=== Half-Saros ===
- Preceded by: Lunar eclipse of April 30, 1893
- Followed by: Lunar eclipse of May 13, 1911

=== Tritos ===
- Preceded by: Solar eclipse of June 6, 1891
- Followed by: Solar eclipse of April 6, 1913

=== Solar Saros 146 ===
- Preceded by: Solar eclipse of April 25, 1884
- Followed by: Solar eclipse of May 18, 1920

=== Inex ===
- Preceded by: Solar eclipse of May 26, 1873
- Followed by: Solar eclipse of April 18, 1931

=== Triad ===
- Preceded by: Solar eclipse of July 6, 1815
- Followed by: Solar eclipse of March 7, 1989

=== Solar eclipses of 1898–1902 ===
This eclipse is a member of a semester series. An eclipse in a semester series of solar eclipses repeats approximately every 177 days and 4 hours (a semester) at alternating nodes of the Moon's orbit.

The solar eclipses on January 22, 1898 (total) and July 18, 1898 (annular) occur in the previous lunar year eclipse set, and the partial solar eclipse on April 8, 1902 occurs in the next lunar year eclipse set.

Solar eclipse series sets from 1898 to 1902
Ascending node			Descending node		
Saros	Map	Gamma	Saros	Map	Gamma
111	December 13, 1898 Partial	−1.5252	116	June 8, 1899 Partial	1.2089
121	December 3, 1899 Annular	−0.9061	126 Totality in Wadesboro, North Carolina	May 28, 1900 Total	0.3943
131	November 22, 1900 Annular	−0.2245	136	May 18, 1901 Total	−0.3626
141	November 11, 1901 Annular	0.4758	146	May 7, 1902 Partial	−1.0831
151	October 31, 1902 Partial	1.1556			

=== Saros 146 ===
This eclipse is a part of Saros series 146, repeating every 18 years, 11 days, and containing 76 events. The series started with a partial solar eclipse on September 19, 1541. It contains total eclipses from May 29, 1938 through October 7, 2154; hybrid eclipses from October 17, 2172 through November 20, 2226; and annular eclipses from November 30, 2244 through August 10, 2659. The series ends at member 76 as a partial eclipse on December 29, 2893. Its eclipses are tabulated in three columns; every third eclipse in the same column is one exeligmos apart, so they all cast shadows over approximately the same parts of the Earth.

The longest duration of totality was produced by member 26 at 5 minutes, 21 seconds on June 30, 1992, and the longest duration of annularity will be produced by member 63 at 3 minutes, 30 seconds on August 10, 2659. All eclipses in this series occur at the Moon’s descending node of orbit.

Series members 16–37 occur between 1801 and 2200:
16	17	18
March 13, 1812	March 24, 1830	April 3, 1848
19	20	21
April 15, 1866	April 25, 1884	May 7, 1902
22	23	24
May 18, 1920	May 29, 1938	June 8, 1956
25	26	27
June 20, 1974	June 30, 1992	July 11, 2010
28	29	30
July 22, 2028	August 2, 2046	August 12, 2064
31	32	33
August 24, 2082	September 4, 2100	September 15, 2118
34	35	36
September 26, 2136	October 7, 2154	October 17, 2172
37
October 29, 2190

=== Metonic series ===
The metonic series repeats eclipses every 19 years (6939.69 days), lasting about 5 cycles. Eclipses occur in nearly the same calendar date. In addition, the octon subseries repeats 1/5 of that or every 3.8 years (1387.94 days). All eclipses in this table occur at the Moon's descending node.

22 eclipse events between February 23, 1830 and July 19, 1917
February 22–23	December 11–12	September 29–30	July 18–19	May 6–7
108	110	112	114	116
February 23, 1830			July 18, 1841	May 6, 1845
118	120	122	124	126
February 23, 1849	December 11, 1852	September 29, 1856	July 18, 1860	May 6, 1864
128	130	132	134	136
February 23, 1868	December 12, 1871	September 29, 1875	July 19, 1879	May 6, 1883
138	140	142	144	146
February 22, 1887	December 12, 1890	September 29, 1894	July 18, 1898	May 7, 1902
148	150	152	154	
February 23, 1906	December 12, 1909	September 30, 1913	July 19, 1917	

=== Tritos series ===
This eclipse is a part of a tritos cycle, repeating at alternating nodes every 135 synodic months (≈ 3986.63 days, or 11 years minus 1 month). Their appearance and longitude are irregular due to a lack of synchronization with the anomalistic month (period of perigee), but groupings of 3 tritos cycles (≈ 33 years minus 3 months) come close (≈ 434.044 anomalistic months), so eclipses are similar in these groupings.

The partial solar eclipse on October 24, 2098 (part of Saros 164) is also a part of this series but is not included in the table below.

Series members between 1801 and 2011
February 11, 1804 (Saros 137)	January 10, 1815 (Saros 138)	December 9, 1825 (Saros 139)	November 9, 1836 (Saros 140)	October 9, 1847 (Saros 141)
September 7, 1858 (Saros 142)	August 7, 1869 (Saros 143)	July 7, 1880 (Saros 144)	June 6, 1891 (Saros 145)	May 7, 1902 (Saros 146)
April 6, 1913 (Saros 147)	March 5, 1924 (Saros 148)	February 3, 1935 (Saros 149)	January 3, 1946 (Saros 150)	December 2, 1956 (Saros 151)
November 2, 1967 (Saros 152)	October 2, 1978 (Saros 153)	August 31, 1989 (Saros 154)	July 31, 2000 (Saros 155)	July 1, 2011 (Saros 156)

=== Inex series ===
This eclipse is a part of the long period inex cycle, repeating at alternating nodes, every 358 synodic months (≈ 10,571.95 days, or 29 years minus 20 days). Their appearance and longitude are irregular due to a lack of synchronization with the anomalistic month (period of perigee). However, groupings of 3 inex cycles (≈ 87 years minus 2 months) comes close (≈ 1,151.02 anomalistic months), so eclipses are similar in these groupings.

Series members between 1801 and 2200
July 6, 1815 (Saros 143)	June 16, 1844 (Saros 144)	May 26, 1873 (Saros 145)
May 7, 1902 (Saros 146)	April 18, 1931 (Saros 147)	March 27, 1960 (Saros 148)
March 7, 1989 (Saros 149)	February 15, 2018 (Saros 150)	January 26, 2047 (Saros 151)
January 6, 2076 (Saros 152)	December 17, 2104 (Saros 153)	November 26, 2133 (Saros 154)
November 7, 2162 (Saros 155)	October 18, 2191 (Saros 156)	
