= Solar eclipse of March 29, 1987 =

Total eclipse

- Hybrid eclipse
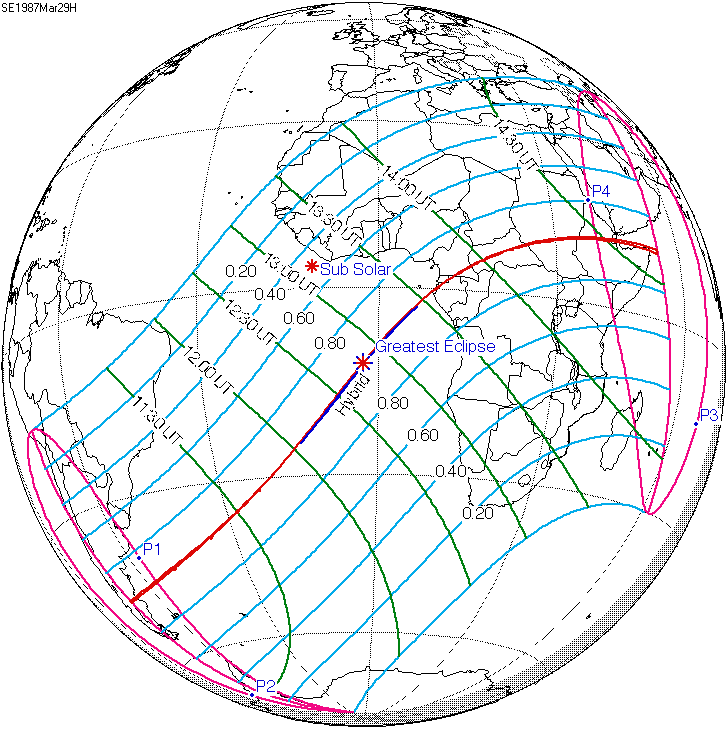
- Map
- Gamma: −0.3053
- Magnitude: 1.0013

Maximum eclipse
- Duration: 8 s (0 min 8 s)
- Coordinates: 12.3°S 2.3°W
- Max. width of band: 5 km (3.1 mi)

Times (UTC)
- Greatest eclipse: 12:49:47

References
- Saros: 129 (50 of 80)
- Catalog # (SE5000): 9480

External image
- http://xjubier.free.fr/en/site_pages/solar_eclipses/HSE_19870329_pg01.html

A total solar eclipse occurred at the Moon's ascending node of orbit on Sunday, March 29, 1987, with a magnitude of 1.0013. It was a hybrid event, with only a fraction of its path as total, and longer sections at the start and end as an annular eclipse. The eclipse lasted a maximum of only 7.57 seconds. A solar eclipse occurs when the Moon passes between Earth and the Sun, thereby totally or partly obscuring the image of the Sun for a viewer on Earth. An annular solar eclipse occurs when the Moon's apparent diameter is smaller than the Sun's, blocking most of the Sun's light and causing the Sun to look like an annulus (ring). An annular eclipse appears as a partial eclipse over a region of the Earth thousands of kilometres wide. The Moon's apparent diameter was larger because it occurred 4.7 days after perigee (on March 24, 1987, at 19:00 UTC) and 7.8 days before apogee (on April 6, 1987, at 7:40 UTC).

Totality of this eclipse was not visible on any land, while annularity was visible in southern Argentina, Gabon, Equatorial Guinea, Cameroon, Central African Republic, Sudan (part of the path of annularity crossed today's South Sudan), Ethiopia, Djibouti and Somaliland. A partial eclipse was visible for parts of southern and central South America, Antarctica, Africa, and the Middle East.

== Eclipse details ==
Shown below are two tables displaying details about this particular solar eclipse. The first table outlines times at which the Moon's penumbra or umbra attains the specific parameter, and the second table describes various other parameters pertaining to this eclipse.

March 29, 1987 Solar Eclipse Times
Event	Time (UTC)
First Penumbral External Contact	1987 March 29 at 10:03:29.8 UTC
First Umbral External Contact	1987 March 29 at 11:05:14.4 UTC
First Central Line	1987 March 29 at 11:05:40.9 UTC
Greatest Duration	1987 March 29 at 11:05:40.9 UTC
First Umbral Internal Contact	1987 March 29 at 11:06:07.5 UTC
First Penumbral Internal Contact	1987 March 29 at 12:14:03.2 UTC
Equatorial Conjunction	1987 March 29 at 12:31:19.9 UTC
Ecliptic Conjunction	1987 March 29 at 12:46:28.0 UTC
Greatest Eclipse	1987 March 29 at 12:49:47.3 UTC
Last Penumbral Internal Contact	1987 March 29 at 13:25:55.5 UTC
Last Umbral Internal Contact	1987 March 29 at 14:33:36.4 UTC
Last Central Line	1987 March 29 at 14:34:05.6 UTC
Last Umbral External Contact	1987 March 29 at 14:34:34.9 UTC
Last Penumbral External Contact	1987 March 29 at 15:36:18.1 UTC

March 29, 1987 Solar Eclipse Parameters
Parameter	Value
Eclipse Magnitude	1.00134
Eclipse Obscuration	1.00267
Gamma	−0.30531
Sun Right Ascension	00h30m29.5s
Sun Declination	+03°17'32.1"
Sun Semi-Diameter	16'01.1"
Sun Equatorial Horizontal Parallax	08.8"
Moon Right Ascension	00h31m03.7s
Moon Declination	+03°02'04.7"
Moon Semi-Diameter	15'47.7"
Moon Equatorial Horizontal Parallax	0°57'58.2"
ΔT	55.4 s

== Eclipse season ==
This eclipse is part of an eclipse season, a period, roughly every six months, when eclipses occur. Only two (or occasionally three) eclipse seasons occur each year, and each season lasts about 35 days and repeats just short of six months (173 days) later; thus two full eclipse seasons always occur each year. Either two or three eclipses happen each eclipse season. In the sequence below, each eclipse is separated by a fortnight.

Eclipse season of March–April 1987
March 29 Ascending node (new moon)	April 14 Descending node (full moon)
Hybrid solar eclipse Solar Saros 129	Penumbral lunar eclipse Lunar Saros 141

== Related eclipses ==
=== Eclipses in 1987 ===
- A hybrid solar eclipse on March 29.
- A penumbral lunar eclipse on April 14.
- An annular solar eclipse on September 23.
- A penumbral lunar eclipse on October 7.

=== Metonic ===
- Preceded by: Solar eclipse of June 11, 1983
- Followed by: Solar eclipse of January 15, 1991

=== Tzolkinex ===
- Preceded by: Solar eclipse of February 16, 1980
- Followed by: Solar eclipse of May 10, 1994

=== Half-Saros ===
- Preceded by: Lunar eclipse of March 24, 1978
- Followed by: Lunar eclipse of April 4, 1996

=== Tritos ===
- Preceded by: Solar eclipse of April 29, 1976
- Followed by: Solar eclipse of February 26, 1998

=== Solar Saros 129 ===
- Preceded by: Solar eclipse of March 18, 1969
- Followed by: Solar eclipse of April 8, 2005

=== Inex ===
- Preceded by: Solar eclipse of April 19, 1958
- Followed by: Solar eclipse of March 9, 2016

=== Triad ===
- Preceded by: Solar eclipse of May 28, 1900
- Followed by: Solar eclipse of January 27, 2074

=== Solar eclipses of 1986–1989 ===
This eclipse is a member of a semester series. An eclipse in a semester series of solar eclipses repeats approximately every 177 days and 4 hours (a semester) at alternating nodes of the Moon's orbit.

Solar eclipse series sets from 1986 to 1989
Ascending node			Descending node		
Saros	Map	Gamma	Saros	Map	Gamma
119	April 9, 1986 Partial	−1.0822	124	October 3, 1986 Hybrid	0.9931
129	March 29, 1987 Hybrid	−0.3053	134	September 23, 1987 Annular	0.2787
139	March 18, 1988 Total	0.4188	144	September 11, 1988 Annular	−0.4681
149	March 7, 1989 Partial	1.0981	154	August 31, 1989 Partial	−1.1928

=== Saros 129 ===
This eclipse is a part of Saros series 129, repeating every 18 years, 11 days, and containing 80 events. The series started with a partial solar eclipse on October 3, 1103. It contains annular eclipses from May 6, 1464 through March 18, 1969; hybrid eclipses from March 29, 1987 through April 20, 2023; and total eclipses from April 30, 2041 through July 26, 2185. The series ends at member 80 as a partial eclipse on February 21, 2528. Its eclipses are tabulated in three columns; every third eclipse in the same column is one exeligmos apart, so they all cast shadows over approximately the same parts of the Earth.

The longest duration of annularity was produced by member 34 at 5 minutes, 10 seconds on October 4, 1698, and the longest duration of totality will be produced by member 58 at 3 minutes, 43 seconds on June 25, 2131. All eclipses in this series occur at the Moon’s ascending node of orbit.

Series members 40–61 occur between 1801 and 2200:
40	41	42
December 10, 1806	December 20, 1824	December 31, 1842
43	44	45
January 11, 1861	January 22, 1879	February 1, 1897
46	47	48
February 14, 1915	February 24, 1933	March 7, 1951
49	50	51
March 18, 1969	March 29, 1987	April 8, 2005
52	53	54
April 20, 2023	April 30, 2041	May 11, 2059
55	56	57
May 22, 2077	June 2, 2095	June 13, 2113
58	59	60
June 25, 2131	July 5, 2149	July 16, 2167
61
July 26, 2185

=== Metonic series ===
The metonic series repeats eclipses every 19 years (6939.69 days), lasting about 5 cycles. Eclipses occur in nearly the same calendar date. In addition, the octon subseries repeats 1/5 of that or every 3.8 years (1387.94 days). All eclipses in this table occur at the Moon's ascending node.

20 eclipse events between June 10, 1964 and August 21, 2036
June 10–11	March 28–29	January 14–16	November 3	August 21–22
117	119	121	123	125
June 10, 1964	March 28, 1968	January 16, 1972	November 3, 1975	August 22, 1979
127	129	131	133	135
June 11, 1983	March 29, 1987	January 15, 1991	November 3, 1994	August 22, 1998
137	139	141	143	145
June 10, 2002	March 29, 2006	January 15, 2010	November 3, 2013	August 21, 2017
147	149	151	153	155
June 10, 2021	March 29, 2025	January 14, 2029	November 3, 2032	August 21, 2036

=== Tritos series ===
This eclipse is a part of a tritos cycle, repeating at alternating nodes every 135 synodic months (≈ 3986.63 days, or 11 years minus 1 month). Their appearance and longitude are irregular due to a lack of synchronization with the anomalistic month (period of perigee), but groupings of 3 tritos cycles (≈ 33 years minus 3 months) come close (≈ 434.044 anomalistic months), so eclipses are similar in these groupings.

Series members between 1801 and 2200
September 8, 1801 (Saros 112)	August 7, 1812 (Saros 113)	July 8, 1823 (Saros 114)	June 7, 1834 (Saros 115)	May 6, 1845 (Saros 116)
April 5, 1856 (Saros 117)	March 6, 1867 (Saros 118)	February 2, 1878 (Saros 119)	January 1, 1889 (Saros 120)	December 3, 1899 (Saros 121)
November 2, 1910 (Saros 122)	October 1, 1921 (Saros 123)	August 31, 1932 (Saros 124)	August 1, 1943 (Saros 125)	June 30, 1954 (Saros 126)
May 30, 1965 (Saros 127)	April 29, 1976 (Saros 128)	March 29, 1987 (Saros 129)	February 26, 1998 (Saros 130)	January 26, 2009 (Saros 131)
December 26, 2019 (Saros 132)	November 25, 2030 (Saros 133)	October 25, 2041 (Saros 134)	September 22, 2052 (Saros 135)	August 24, 2063 (Saros 136)
July 24, 2074 (Saros 137)	June 22, 2085 (Saros 138)	May 22, 2096 (Saros 139)	April 23, 2107 (Saros 140)	March 22, 2118 (Saros 141)
February 18, 2129 (Saros 142)	January 20, 2140 (Saros 143)	December 19, 2150 (Saros 144)	November 17, 2161 (Saros 145)	October 17, 2172 (Saros 146)
September 16, 2183 (Saros 147)	August 16, 2194 (Saros 148)			

=== Inex series ===
This eclipse is a part of the long period inex cycle, repeating at alternating nodes, every 358 synodic months (≈ 10,571.95 days, or 29 years minus 20 days). Their appearance and longitude are irregular due to a lack of synchronization with the anomalistic month (period of perigee). However, groupings of 3 inex cycles (≈ 87 years minus 2 months) comes close (≈ 1,151.02 anomalistic months), so eclipses are similar in these groupings.

Series members between 1801 and 2200
July 27, 1813 (Saros 123)	July 8, 1842 (Saros 124)	June 18, 1871 (Saros 125)
May 28, 1900 (Saros 126)	May 9, 1929 (Saros 127)	April 19, 1958 (Saros 128)
March 29, 1987 (Saros 129)	March 9, 2016 (Saros 130)	February 16, 2045 (Saros 131)
January 27, 2074 (Saros 132)	January 8, 2103 (Saros 133)	December 19, 2131 (Saros 134)
November 27, 2160 (Saros 135)	November 8, 2189 (Saros 136)	
