= Solar Saros 123 =

Saros cycle series 123 for solar eclipses

Saros 123

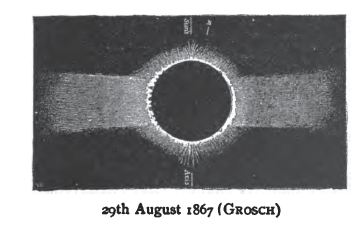
August 29, 1867 Series member 45

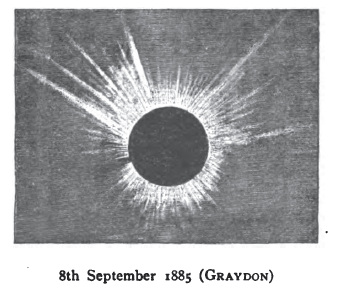
September 8, 1885 Series member 46

Saros cycle series 123 for solar eclipses occurs at the Moon's ascending node, repeating every 18 years, 11 days, containing 70 eclipses, 44 of which are umbral (27 annular, 3 hybrid, 14 total). The first eclipse in the series was on 29 April 1074 and the last will be on 31 May 2318. The most recent eclipse was a partial eclipse on 25 November 2011 and the next will be a partial eclipse on 5 December 2029.

The longest totality was 3 minutes 27 seconds on 27 July 1813, the longest annular was 8 minutes 7 seconds on 9 November 1398, and the longest hybrid eclipse was 1 minute 32 seconds on 22 May 1705.

This solar saros is linked to Lunar Saros 116.

== Umbral eclipses ==
Umbral eclipses (annular, total and hybrid) can be further classified as either: 1) Central (two limits), 2) Central (one limit) or 3) Non-Central (one limit). The statistical distribution of these classes in Saros series 123 appears in the following table.

Classification	Number	Percent
All Umbral eclipses	44	100.00%
Central (two limits)	42	95.45%
Central (one limit)	1	2.27%
Non-central (one limit)	1	2.27%

== All eclipses ==
Note: Dates are given in the Julian calendar prior to 15 October 1582, and in the Gregorian calendar after that.

Saros	Member	Date	Time (Greatest) UTC	Type	Location Lat, Long	Gamma	Mag.	Width (km)	Duration (min:sec)	Ref
123	1	April 29, 1074	1:23:46	Partial	62.2N 39.8E	1.4965	0.1151			
123	2	May 9, 1092	7:55:04	Partial	62.8N 67.4W	1.4182	0.2481			
123	3	May 20, 1110	14:22:27	Partial	63.6N 173.8W	1.3362	0.3876			
123	4	May 30, 1128	20:45:57	Partial	64.5N 80.5E	1.2507	0.5336			
123	5	June 11, 1146	3:09:15	Partial	65.4N 25.5W	1.1642	0.6817			
123	6	June 21, 1164	9:30:36	Partial	66.4N 131.2W	1.0754	0.8336			
123	7	July 2, 1182	15:55:48	Annular (Note: No northern limit)	74.6N 120.1E	0.9892	0.9368	-	3m 50s	
123	8	July 12, 1200	22:22:50	Annular	83.6N 101.5W	0.9039	0.9409	521	4m 12s	
123	9	July 24, 1218	4:55:35	Annular	72.3N 135.3E	0.8225	0.9425	376	4m 34s	
123	10	August 3, 1236	11:33:03	Annular	61.9N 29.8E	0.7441	0.9432	314	4m 57s	
123	11	August 14, 1254	18:19:43	Annular	52.6N 75.8W	0.6726	0.9433	282	5m 23s	
123	12	August 25, 1272	1:13:45	Annular	43.9N 177.3E	0.6067	0.943	264	5m 50s	
123	13	September 5, 1290	8:17:10	Annular	35.8N 68.4E	0.548	0.9424	253	6m 17s	
123	14	September 15, 1308	15:30:02	Annular	28.2N 42.6W	0.4964	0.9417	247	6m 43s	
123	15	September 26, 1326	22:53:53	Annular	21.3N 156.1W	0.4531	0.9409	244	7m 7s	
123	16	October 7, 1344	6:26:57	Annular	15.1N 88.4E	0.417	0.9402	242	7m 29s	
123	17	October 18, 1362	14:09:27	Annular	9.6N 29.1W	0.3879	0.9397	241	7m 48s	
123	18	October 28, 1380	22:00:47	Annular	4.9N 148.4W	0.3656	0.9395	240	8m 1s	
123	19	November 9, 1398	6:00:34	Annular	1.1N 90.5E	0.3493	0.9397	238	8m 7s	
123	20	November 19, 1416	14:05:55	Annular	1.8S 31.6W	0.337	0.9404	234	8m 5s	
123	21	November 30, 1434	22:17:34	Annular	3.7S 155W	0.329	0.9416	229	7m 54s	
123	22	December 11, 1452	6:31:53	Annular	4.8S 81.1E	0.3224	0.9434	221	7m 32s	
123	23	December 22, 1470	14:49:05	Annular	4.9S 43.4W	0.3175	0.9458	210	7m 2s	
123	24	January 1, 1489	23:04:27	Annular	4.3S 167.5W	0.3102	0.9489	197	6m 24s	
123	25	January 13, 1507	7:20:10	Annular	3S 68.3E	0.3024	0.9526	181	5m 42s	
123	26	January 23, 1525	15:31:21	Annular	1.2S 54.8W	0.2897	0.9569	163	4m 58s	
123	27	February 3, 1543	23:38:52	Annular	1N 177W	0.2735	0.9617	143	4m 14s	
123	28	February 14, 1561	7:39:21	Annular	3.4N 62.6E	0.2507	0.967	122	3m 30s	
123	29	February 25, 1579	15:34:47	Annular	6N 56.4W	0.2229	0.9728	100	2m 48s	
123	30	March 17, 1597	23:22:39	Annular	8.4N 173.3W	0.1878	0.9788	77	2m 8s	
123	31	March 29, 1615	7:03:24	Annular	10.7N 71.7E	0.1461	0.9851	53	1m 28s	
123	32	April 8, 1633	14:37:06	Annular	12.4N 41.2W	0.0976	0.9913	31	0m 51s	
123	33	April 19, 1651	22:04:37	Annular	13.7N 152.4W	0.0433	0.9976	8	0m 14s	
123	34	April 30, 1669	5:26:07	Hybrid	14.1N 98.2E	-0.0171	1.0036	13	0m 22s	
123	35	May 11, 1687	12:42:28	Hybrid	13.6N 9.9W	-0.0828	1.0094	33	0m 57s	
123	36	May 22, 1705	19:55:06	Hybrid	12.2N 117W	-0.1525	1.0147	51	1m 32s	
123	37	June 3, 1723	3:05:13	Total	9.6N 136.1E	-0.2251	1.0196	69	2m 5s	
123	38	June 13, 1741	10:12:48	Total	6N 29.4E	-0.3007	1.0239	85	2m 35s	
123	39	June 24, 1759	17:20:59	Total	1.4N 78.1W	-0.3768	1.0275	101	2m 59s	
123	40	July 5, 1777	0:29:29	Total	4.2S 173.7E	-0.4531	1.0305	115	3m 17s	
123	41	July 16, 1795	7:41:36	Total	10.4S 63.8E	-0.5274	1.0327	130	3m 26s	
123	42	July 27, 1813	14:55:35	Total	17.4S 47.4W	-0.6006	1.0341	144	3m 27s	
123	43	August 7, 1831	22:15:59	Total	24.9S 160.9W	-0.6691	1.0349	158	3m 20s	
123	44	August 18, 1849	5:40:49	Total	32.9S 83.5E	-0.7343	1.0349	172	3m 7s	
123	45	August 29, 1867	13:13:07	Total	41.1S 34.9W	-0.794	1.0344	189	2m 51s	
123	46	September 8, 1885	20:51:52	Total	49.6S 156.5W	-0.8489	1.0332	211	2m 31s	
123	47	September 21, 1903	4:39:52	Total	58S 77.2E	-0.8967	1.0316	241	2m 12s	
123	48	October 1, 1921	12:35:58	Total	66.1S 56.1W	-0.9383	1.0293	291	1m 52s	
123	49	October 12, 1939	20:40:23	Total	72.8S 155.1E	-0.9737	1.0266	418	1m 32s	
123	50	October 23, 1957	4:54:02	Total (Note: Non-central)	71.2S 23.1W	1.0022	1.0013	-	-	
123	51	November 3, 1975	13:15:54	Partial	70.4S 161.7W	-1.0248	0.9588			
123	52	November 13, 1993	21:45:51	Partial	69.6S 58.3E	-1.0411	0.928			
123	53	November 25, 2011	6:21:24	Partial	68.6S 82.4W	-1.0536	0.9047			
123	54	December 5, 2029	15:03:58	Partial	67.5S 135.7E	-1.0609	0.8911			
123	55	December 16, 2047	23:50:12	Partial	66.4S 6.6W	-1.0661	0.8816			
123	56	December 27, 2065	8:39:56	Partial	65.4S 149.2W	-1.0688	0.8769			
123	57	January 7, 2084	17:30:23	Partial	64.4S 68.5E	-1.0715	0.8723			
123	58	January 19, 2102	2:21:30	Partial	63.5S 73.6W	-1.0741	0.8682			
123	59	January 30, 2120	11:09:56	Partial	62.7S 145.3E	-1.0792	0.8594			
123	60	February 9, 2138	19:55:23	Partial	62.1S 5.1E	-1.0872	0.8453			
123	61	February 21, 2156	4:36:02	Partial	61.6S 133.7W	-1.0995	0.823			
123	62	March 3, 2174	13:11:54	Partial	61.3S 88.7E	-1.1162	0.7924			
123	63	March 13, 2192	21:40:00	Partial	61.1S 46.8W	-1.1395	0.7491			
123	64	March 26, 2210	6:01:57	Partial	61.1S 179.2E	-1.168	0.6954			
123	65	April 5, 2228	14:15:36	Partial	61.3S 47.3E	-1.2036	0.6279			
123	66	April 16, 2246	22:23:24	Partial	61.6S 83.2W	-1.2445	0.5498			
123	67	April 27, 2264	6:21:41	Partial	62.1S 148.5E	-1.2931	0.4564			
123	68	May 8, 2282	14:15:16	Partial	62.7S 21.3E	-1.3458	0.3545			
123	69	May 19, 2300	22:00:39	Partial	63.4S 104.1W	-1.4049	0.2399			
123	70	May 31, 2318	5:42:33	Partial	64.2S 131.2E	-1.467	0.1192			
