= Solar eclipse of September 21, 1903 =

Total eclipse

- Total eclipse
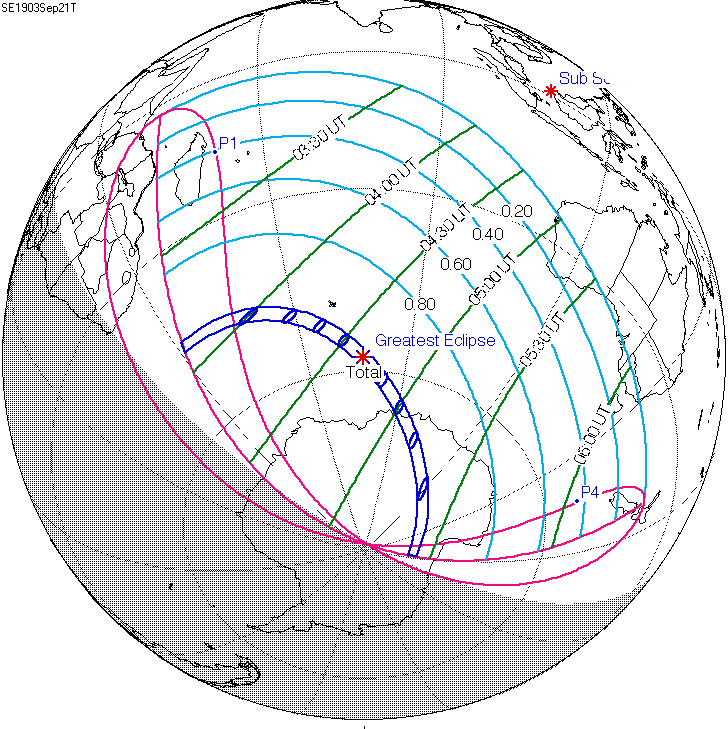
- Map
- Gamma: −0.8967
- Magnitude: 1.0316

Maximum eclipse
- Duration: 132 s (2 min 12 s)
- Coordinates: 58°S 77.2°E
- Max. width of band: 241 km (150 mi)

Times (UTC)
- Greatest eclipse: 4:39:52

References
- Saros: 123 (47 of 70)
- Catalog # (SE5000): 9289

A total solar eclipse occurred at the Moon's ascending node of orbit on Monday, September 21, 1903, with a magnitude of 1.0316. A solar eclipse occurs when the Moon passes between Earth and the Sun, thereby totally or partly obscuring the image of the Sun for a viewer on Earth. A total solar eclipse occurs when the Moon's apparent diameter is larger than the Sun's, blocking all direct sunlight, turning day into darkness. Totality occurs in a narrow path across Earth's surface, with the partial solar eclipse visible over a surrounding region thousands of kilometres wide. Occurring about 2.1 days after perigee (on September 19, 1904, at 2:00 UTC), the Moon's apparent diameter was larger.

The path of totality crossed Antarctica and the south Indian Ocean. A partial eclipse was visible for parts of Southeast Africa, Southern Australia, New Zealand, and Antarctica.

== Eclipse details ==
Shown below are two tables displaying details about this particular solar eclipse. The first table outlines times at which the Moon's penumbra or umbra attains the specific parameter, and the second table describes various other parameters pertaining to this eclipse.

September 21, 1903 Solar Eclipse Times
Event	Time (UTC)
First Penumbral External Contact	1903 September 21 at 02:27:46.5 UTC
First Umbral External Contact	1903 September 21 at 03:52:01.4 UTC
First Central Line	1903 September 21 at 03:53:33.3 UTC
First Umbral Internal Contact	1903 September 21 at 03:55:07.6 UTC
Ecliptic Conjunction	1903 September 21 at 04:30:40.1 UTC
Greatest Duration	1903 September 21 at 04:38:45.6 UTC
Greatest Eclipse	1903 September 21 at 04:39:51.9 UTC
Equatorial Conjunction	1903 September 21 at 05:10:23.8 UTC
Last Umbral Internal Contact	1903 September 21 at 05:24:15.9 UTC
Last Central Line	1903 September 21 at 05:25:48.2 UTC
Last Umbral External Contact	1903 September 21 at 05:27:18.0 UTC
Last Penumbral External Contact	1903 September 21 at 06:51:47.0 UTC

September 21, 1903 Solar Eclipse Parameters
Parameter	Value
Eclipse Magnitude	1.03156
Eclipse Obscuration	1.06411
Gamma	−0.89674
Sun Right Ascension	11h49m03.6s
Sun Declination	+01°11'08.7"
Sun Semi-Diameter	15'55.9"
Sun Equatorial Horizontal Parallax	08.8"
Moon Right Ascension	11h47m57.9s
Moon Declination	+00°20'09.1"
Moon Semi-Diameter	16'19.2"
Moon Equatorial Horizontal Parallax	0°59'53.7"
ΔT	2.2 s

== Eclipse season ==
This eclipse is part of an eclipse season, a period, roughly every six months, when eclipses occur. Only two (or occasionally three) eclipse seasons occur each year, and each season lasts about 35 days and repeats just short of six months (173 days) later; thus two full eclipse seasons always occur each year. Either two or three eclipses happen each eclipse season. In the sequence below, each eclipse is separated by a fortnight.

Eclipse season of September–October 1903
September 21 Ascending node (new moon)	October 6 Descending node (full moon)
Total solar eclipse Solar Saros 123	Partial lunar eclipse Lunar Saros 135

== Related eclipses ==
=== Eclipses in 1903 ===
- An annular solar eclipse on March 29.
- A partial lunar eclipse on April 12.
- A total solar eclipse on September 21.
- A partial lunar eclipse on October 6.

=== Metonic ===
- Preceded by: Solar eclipse of December 3, 1899
- Followed by: Solar eclipse of July 10, 1907

=== Tzolkinex ===
- Preceded by: Solar eclipse of August 9, 1896
- Followed by: Solar eclipse of November 2, 1910

=== Half-Saros ===
- Preceded by: Lunar eclipse of September 15, 1894
- Followed by: Lunar eclipse of September 26, 1912

=== Tritos ===
- Preceded by: Solar eclipse of October 20, 1892
- Followed by: Solar eclipse of August 21, 1914

=== Solar Saros 123 ===
- Preceded by: Solar eclipse of September 8, 1885
- Followed by: Solar eclipse of October 1, 1921

=== Inex ===
- Preceded by: Solar eclipse of October 10, 1874
- Followed by: Solar eclipse of August 31, 1932

=== Triad ===
- Preceded by: Solar eclipse of November 19, 1816
- Followed by: Solar eclipse of July 22, 1990

=== Solar eclipses of 1902–1906 ===
This eclipse is a member of a semester series. An eclipse in a semester series of solar eclipses repeats approximately every 177 days and 4 hours (a semester) at alternating nodes of the Moon's orbit.

The partial solar eclipses on May 7, 1902 and October 31, 1902 occur in the previous lunar year eclipse set, and the partial solar eclipse on July 21, 1906 occurs in the next lunar year eclipse set.

Solar eclipse series sets from 1902 to 1906
Descending node			Ascending node		
Saros	Map	Gamma	Saros	Map	Gamma
108	April 8, 1902 Partial	1.5024	113	October 1, 1902	
118	March 29, 1903 Annular	0.8413	123	September 21, 1903 Total	−0.8967
128	March 17, 1904 Annular	0.1299	133	September 9, 1904 Total	−0.1625
138	March 6, 1905 Annular	−0.5768	143	August 30, 1905 Total	0.5708
148	February 23, 1906 Partial	−1.2479	153	August 20, 1906 Partial	1.3731

=== Saros 123 ===
This eclipse is a part of Saros series 123, repeating every 18 years, 11 days, and containing 70 events. The series started with a partial solar eclipse on April 29, 1074. It contains annular eclipses from July 2, 1182 through April 19, 1651; hybrid eclipses from April 30, 1669 through May 22, 1705; and total eclipses from June 3, 1723 through October 23, 1957. The series ends at member 70 as a partial eclipse on May 31, 2318. Its eclipses are tabulated in three columns; every third eclipse in the same column is one exeligmos apart, so they all cast shadows over approximately the same parts of the Earth.

The longest duration of annularity was produced by member 19 at 8 minutes, 7 seconds on November 9, 1398, and the longest duration of totality was produced by member 42 at 3 minutes, 27 seconds on July 27, 1813. All eclipses in this series occur at the Moon’s ascending node of orbit.

Series members 42–63 occur between 1801 and 2200:
42	43	44
July 27, 1813	August 7, 1831	August 18, 1849
45	46	47
August 29, 1867	September 8, 1885	September 21, 1903
48	49	50
October 1, 1921	October 12, 1939	October 23, 1957
51	52	53
November 3, 1975	November 13, 1993	November 25, 2011
54	55	56
December 5, 2029	December 16, 2047	December 27, 2065
57	58	59
January 7, 2084	January 19, 2102	January 30, 2120
60	61	62
February 9, 2138	February 21, 2156	March 3, 2174
63
March 13, 2192

=== Metonic series ===
The metonic series repeats eclipses every 19 years (6939.69 days), lasting about 5 cycles. Eclipses occur in nearly the same calendar date. In addition, the octon subseries repeats 1/5 of that or every 3.8 years (1387.94 days). All eclipses in this table occur at the Moon's ascending node.

22 eclipse events between December 2, 1880 and July 9, 1964
December 2–3	September 20–21	July 9–10	April 26–28	February 13–14
111	113	115	117	119
December 2, 1880		July 9, 1888	April 26, 1892	February 13, 1896
121	123	125	127	129
December 3, 1899	September 21, 1903	July 10, 1907	April 28, 1911	February 14, 1915
131	133	135	137	139
December 3, 1918	September 21, 1922	July 9, 1926	April 28, 1930	February 14, 1934
141	143	145	147	149
December 2, 1937	September 21, 1941	July 9, 1945	April 28, 1949	February 14, 1953
151	153	155		
December 2, 1956	September 20, 1960	July 9, 1964		

=== Tritos series ===
This eclipse is a part of a tritos cycle, repeating at alternating nodes every 135 synodic months (≈ 3986.63 days, or 11 years minus 1 month). Their appearance and longitude are irregular due to a lack of synchronization with the anomalistic month (period of perigee), but groupings of 3 tritos cycles (≈ 33 years minus 3 months) come close (≈ 434.044 anomalistic months), so eclipses are similar in these groupings.

Series members between 1801 and 2200
June 26, 1805 (Saros 114)	May 27, 1816 (Saros 115)	April 26, 1827 (Saros 116)	March 25, 1838 (Saros 117)	February 23, 1849 (Saros 118)
January 23, 1860 (Saros 119)	December 22, 1870 (Saros 120)	November 21, 1881 (Saros 121)	October 20, 1892 (Saros 122)	September 21, 1903 (Saros 123)
August 21, 1914 (Saros 124)	July 20, 1925 (Saros 125)	June 19, 1936 (Saros 126)	May 20, 1947 (Saros 127)	April 19, 1958 (Saros 128)
March 18, 1969 (Saros 129)	February 16, 1980 (Saros 130)	January 15, 1991 (Saros 131)	December 14, 2001 (Saros 132)	November 13, 2012 (Saros 133)
October 14, 2023 (Saros 134)	September 12, 2034 (Saros 135)	August 12, 2045 (Saros 136)	July 12, 2056 (Saros 137)	June 11, 2067 (Saros 138)
May 11, 2078 (Saros 139)	April 10, 2089 (Saros 140)	March 10, 2100 (Saros 141)	February 8, 2111 (Saros 142)	January 8, 2122 (Saros 143)
December 7, 2132 (Saros 144)	November 7, 2143 (Saros 145)	October 7, 2154 (Saros 146)	September 5, 2165 (Saros 147)	August 4, 2176 (Saros 148)
July 6, 2187 (Saros 149)	June 4, 2198 (Saros 150)			

=== Inex series ===
This eclipse is a part of the long period inex cycle, repeating at alternating nodes, every 358 synodic months (≈ 10,571.95 days, or 29 years minus 20 days). Their appearance and longitude are irregular due to a lack of synchronization with the anomalistic month (period of perigee). However, groupings of 3 inex cycles (≈ 87 years minus 2 months) comes close (≈ 1,151.02 anomalistic months), so eclipses are similar in these groupings.

Series members between 1801 and 2200
November 19, 1816 (Saros 120)	October 30, 1845 (Saros 121)	October 10, 1874 (Saros 122)
September 21, 1903 (Saros 123)	August 31, 1932 (Saros 124)	August 11, 1961 (Saros 125)
July 22, 1990 (Saros 126)	July 2, 2019 (Saros 127)	June 11, 2048 (Saros 128)
May 22, 2077 (Saros 129)	May 3, 2106 (Saros 130)	April 13, 2135 (Saros 131)
March 23, 2164 (Saros 132)	March 3, 2193 (Saros 133)	
