= Solar eclipse of August 11, 1961 =

20th-century annular solar eclipse

- Annular eclipse
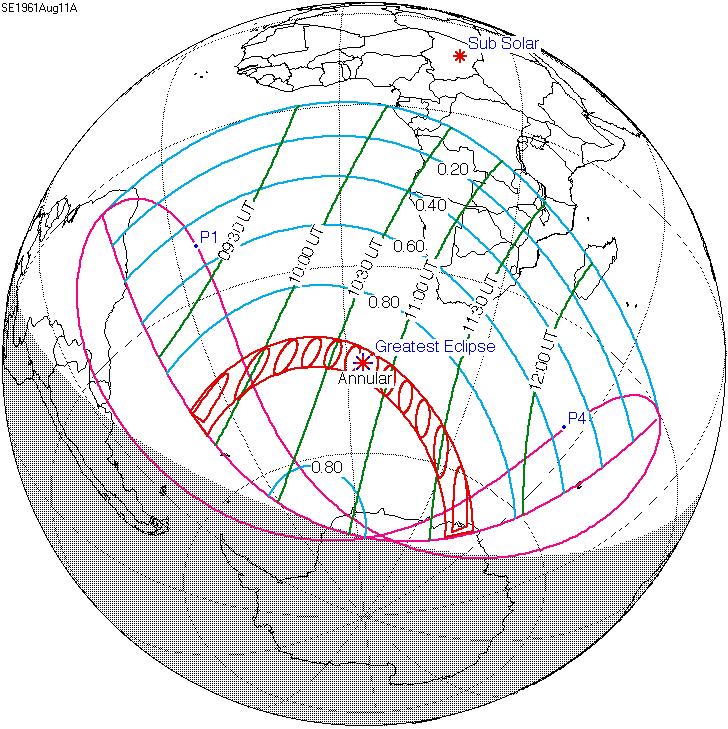
- Map
- Gamma: −0.8859
- Magnitude: 0.9375

Maximum eclipse
- Duration: 395 s (6 min 35 s)
- Coordinates: 45.8°S 4°E
- Max. width of band: 499 km (310 mi)

Times (UTC)
- Greatest eclipse: 10:46:47

References
- Saros: 125 (51 of 73)
- Catalog # (SE5000): 9423

An annular solar eclipse occurred at the Moon's ascending node of orbit on Friday, August 11, 1961, with a magnitude of 0.9375. A solar eclipse occurs when the Moon passes between Earth and the Sun, thereby totally or partly obscuring the image of the Sun for a viewer on Earth. An annular solar eclipse occurs when the Moon's apparent diameter is smaller than the Sun's, blocking most of the Sun's light and causing the Sun to look like an annulus (ring). An annular eclipse appears as a partial eclipse over a region of the Earth thousands of kilometres wide. Occurring about 7 hours after apogee (on August 11, 1961, at 17:50 UTC), the Moon's apparent diameter was smaller.

Annularity was visible from a part of Antarctica. A partial eclipse was visible for parts of eastern South America, Southern Africa, and Antarctica.

== Eclipse details ==
Shown below are two tables displaying details about this particular solar eclipse. The first table outlines times at which the Moon's penumbra or umbra attains the specific parameter, and the second table describes various other parameters pertaining to this eclipse.

August 11, 1961 Solar Eclipse Times
Event	Time (UTC)
First Penumbral External Contact	1961 August 11 at 08:13:26.2 UTC
First Umbral External Contact	1961 August 11 at 09:47:06.3 UTC
First Central Line	1961 August 11 at 09:52:11.0 UTC
First Umbral Internal Contact	1961 August 11 at 09:57:40.3 UTC
Ecliptic Conjunction	1961 August 11 at 10:36:17.9 UTC
Greatest Duration	1961 August 11 at 10:45:02.0 UTC
Greatest Eclipse	1961 August 11 at 10:46:46.9 UTC
Equatorial Conjunction	1961 August 11 at 11:09:44.1 UTC
Last Umbral Internal Contact	1961 August 11 at 11:35:36.6 UTC
Last Central Line	1961 August 11 at 11:41:06.3 UTC
Last Umbral External Contact	1961 August 11 at 11:46:11.6 UTC
Last Penumbral External Contact	1961 August 11 at 13:19:57.6 UTC

August 11, 1961 Solar Eclipse Parameters
Parameter	Value
Eclipse Magnitude	0.93753
Eclipse Obscuration	0.87897
Gamma	−0.88594
Sun Right Ascension	09h23m48.0s
Sun Declination	+15°16'44.3"
Sun Semi-Diameter	15'46.9"
Sun Equatorial Horizontal Parallax	08.7"
Moon Right Ascension	09h23m06.0s
Moon Declination	+14°30'09.9"
Moon Semi-Diameter	14'41.9"
Moon Equatorial Horizontal Parallax	0°53'56.8"
ΔT	33.8 s

== Eclipse season ==
This eclipse is part of an eclipse season, a period, roughly every six months, when eclipses occur. Only two (or occasionally three) eclipse seasons occur each year, and each season lasts about 35 days and repeats just short of six months (173 days) later; thus two full eclipse seasons always occur each year. Either two or three eclipses happen each eclipse season. In the sequence below, each eclipse is separated by a fortnight.

Eclipse season of August 1961
August 11 Ascending node (new moon)	August 26 Descending node (full moon)
Annular solar eclipse Solar Saros 125	Partial lunar eclipse Lunar Saros 137

== Related eclipses ==
=== Eclipses in 1961 ===
- A total solar eclipse on February 15.
- A partial lunar eclipse on March 2.
- An annular solar eclipse on August 11.
- A partial lunar eclipse on August 26.

=== Metonic ===
- Preceded by: Solar eclipse of October 23, 1957
- Followed by: Solar eclipse of May 30, 1965

=== Tzolkinex ===
- Preceded by: Solar eclipse of June 30, 1954
- Followed by: Solar eclipse of September 22, 1968

=== Half-Saros ===
- Preceded by: Lunar eclipse of August 5, 1952
- Followed by: Lunar eclipse of August 17, 1970

=== Tritos ===
- Preceded by: Solar eclipse of September 12, 1950
- Followed by: Solar eclipse of July 10, 1972

=== Solar Saros 125 ===
- Preceded by: Solar eclipse of August 1, 1943
- Followed by: Solar eclipse of August 22, 1979

=== Inex ===
- Preceded by: Solar eclipse of August 31, 1932
- Followed by: Solar eclipse of July 22, 1990

=== Triad ===
- Preceded by: Solar eclipse of October 10, 1874
- Followed by: Solar eclipse of June 11, 2048

=== Solar eclipses of 1961–1964 ===
This eclipse is a member of a semester series. An eclipse in a semester series of solar eclipses repeats approximately every 177 days and 4 hours (a semester) at alternating nodes of the Moon's orbit.

The partial solar eclipses on June 10, 1964 and December 4, 1964 occur in the next lunar year eclipse set.

Solar eclipse series sets from 1961 to 1964
Descending node			Ascending node		
Saros	Map	Gamma	Saros	Map	Gamma
120	February 15, 1961 Total	0.883	125	August 11, 1961 Annular	−0.8859
130	February 5, 1962 Total	0.2107	135	July 31, 1962 Annular	−0.113
140	January 25, 1963 Annular	−0.4898	145	July 20, 1963 Total	0.6571
150	January 14, 1964 Partial	−1.2354	155	July 9, 1964 Partial	1.3623

=== Saros 125 ===
This eclipse is a part of Saros series 125, repeating every 18 years, 11 days, and containing 73 events. The series started with a partial solar eclipse on February 4, 1060. It contains total eclipses from June 13, 1276 through July 16, 1330; hybrid eclipses on July 26, 1348 and August 7, 1366; and annular eclipses from August 17, 1384 through August 22, 1979. The series ends at member 73 as a partial eclipse on April 9, 2358. Its eclipses are tabulated in three columns; every third eclipse in the same column is one exeligmos apart, so they all cast shadows over approximately the same parts of the Earth.

The longest duration of totality was produced by member 14 at 1 minutes, 11 seconds on June 25, 1294, and the longest duration of annularity was produced by member 48 at 7 minutes, 23 seconds on July 10, 1907. All eclipses in this series occur at the Moon’s ascending node of orbit.

Series members 43–64 occur between 1801 and 2200:
43	44	45
May 16, 1817	May 27, 1835	June 6, 1853
46	47	48
June 18, 1871	June 28, 1889	July 10, 1907
49	50	51
July 20, 1925	August 1, 1943	August 11, 1961
52	53	54
August 22, 1979	September 2, 1997	September 13, 2015
55	56	57
September 23, 2033	October 4, 2051	October 15, 2069
58	59	60
October 26, 2087	November 6, 2105	November 18, 2123
61	62	63
November 28, 2141	December 9, 2159	December 20, 2177
64
December 31, 2195

=== Metonic series ===
The metonic series repeats eclipses every 19 years (6939.69 days), lasting about 5 cycles. Eclipses occur in nearly the same calendar date. In addition, the octon subseries repeats 1/5 of that or every 3.8 years (1387.94 days). All eclipses in this table occur at the Moon's ascending node.

22 eclipse events between January 5, 1935 and August 11, 2018
January 4–5	October 23–24	August 10–12	May 30–31	March 18–19
111	113	115	117	119
January 5, 1935		August 12, 1942	May 30, 1946	March 18, 1950
121	123	125	127	129
January 5, 1954	October 23, 1957	August 11, 1961	May 30, 1965	March 18, 1969
131	133	135	137	139
January 4, 1973	October 23, 1976	August 10, 1980	May 30, 1984	March 18, 1988
141	143	145	147	149
January 4, 1992	October 24, 1995	August 11, 1999	May 31, 2003	March 19, 2007
151	153	155		
January 4, 2011	October 23, 2014	August 11, 2018		

=== Tritos series ===
This eclipse is a part of a tritos cycle, repeating at alternating nodes every 135 synodic months (≈ 3986.63 days, or 11 years minus 1 month). Their appearance and longitude are irregular due to a lack of synchronization with the anomalistic month (period of perigee), but groupings of 3 tritos cycles (≈ 33 years minus 3 months) come close (≈ 434.044 anomalistic months), so eclipses are similar in these groupings.

Series members between 1801 and 2200
October 19, 1808 (Saros 111)	September 19, 1819 (Saros 112)	August 18, 1830 (Saros 113)	July 18, 1841 (Saros 114)	June 17, 1852 (Saros 115)
May 17, 1863 (Saros 116)	April 16, 1874 (Saros 117)	March 16, 1885 (Saros 118)	February 13, 1896 (Saros 119)	January 14, 1907 (Saros 120)
December 14, 1917 (Saros 121)	November 12, 1928 (Saros 122)	October 12, 1939 (Saros 123)	September 12, 1950 (Saros 124)	August 11, 1961 (Saros 125)
July 10, 1972 (Saros 126)	June 11, 1983 (Saros 127)	May 10, 1994 (Saros 128)	April 8, 2005 (Saros 129)	March 9, 2016 (Saros 130)
February 6, 2027 (Saros 131)	January 5, 2038 (Saros 132)	December 5, 2048 (Saros 133)	November 5, 2059 (Saros 134)	October 4, 2070 (Saros 135)
September 3, 2081 (Saros 136)	August 3, 2092 (Saros 137)	July 4, 2103 (Saros 138)	June 3, 2114 (Saros 139)	May 3, 2125 (Saros 140)
April 1, 2136 (Saros 141)	March 2, 2147 (Saros 142)	January 30, 2158 (Saros 143)	December 29, 2168 (Saros 144)	November 28, 2179 (Saros 145)
October 29, 2190 (Saros 146)

=== Inex series ===
This eclipse is a part of the long period inex cycle, repeating at alternating nodes, every 358 synodic months (≈ 10,571.95 days, or 29 years minus 20 days). Their appearance and longitude are irregular due to a lack of synchronization with the anomalistic month (period of perigee). However, groupings of 3 inex cycles (≈ 87 years minus 2 months) comes close (≈ 1,151.02 anomalistic months), so eclipses are similar in these groupings.

Series members between 1801 and 2200
November 19, 1816 (Saros 120)	October 30, 1845 (Saros 121)	October 10, 1874 (Saros 122)
September 21, 1903 (Saros 123)	August 31, 1932 (Saros 124)	August 11, 1961 (Saros 125)
July 22, 1990 (Saros 126)	July 2, 2019 (Saros 127)	June 11, 2048 (Saros 128)
May 22, 2077 (Saros 129)	May 3, 2106 (Saros 130)	April 13, 2135 (Saros 131)
March 23, 2164 (Saros 132)	March 3, 2193 (Saros 133)	
