= Solar eclipse of November 3, 1975 =

20th-century partial solar eclipse

- Partial eclipse
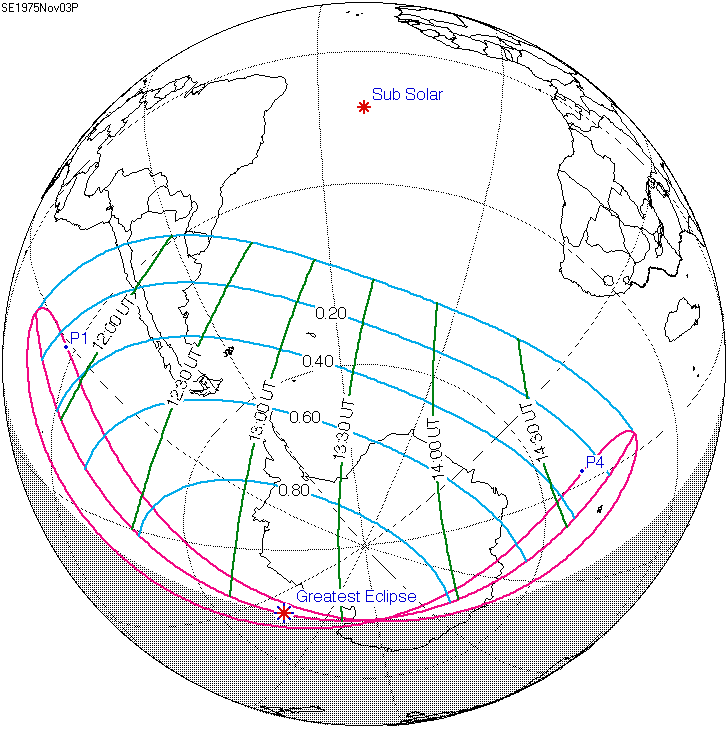
- Map
- Gamma: −1.0248
- Magnitude: 0.9588

Maximum eclipse
- Coordinates: 70.4°S 161.7°W

Times (UTC)
- Greatest eclipse: 13:15:54

References
- Saros: 123 (51 of 70)
- Catalog # (SE5000): 9455

A partial solar eclipse occurred at the Moon's ascending node of orbit on Monday, November 3, 1975, with a magnitude of 0.9588. A solar eclipse occurs when the Moon passes between Earth and the Sun, thereby totally or partly obscuring the image of the Sun for a viewer on Earth. A partial solar eclipse occurs in the polar regions of the Earth when the center of the Moon's shadow misses the Earth.

A partial eclipse was visible for parts of southern South America and Antarctica.

== Eclipse details ==
Shown below are two tables displaying details about this particular solar eclipse. The first table outlines times at which the Moon's penumbra or umbra attains the specific parameter, and the second table describes various other parameters pertaining to this eclipse.

November 3, 1975 Solar Eclipse Times
Event	Time (UTC)
First Penumbral External Contact	1975 November 03 at 11:15:40.6 UTC
Ecliptic Conjunction	1975 November 03 at 13:05:32.0 UTC
Greatest Eclipse	1975 November 03 at 13:15:54.3 UTC
Equatorial Conjunction	1975 November 03 at 13:40:06.5 UTC
Last Penumbral External Contact	1975 November 03 at 15:16:00.1 UTC

November 3, 1975 Solar Eclipse Parameters
Parameter	Value
Eclipse Magnitude	0.95883
Eclipse Obscuration	0.95347
Gamma	−1.02475
Sun Right Ascension	14h32m18.5s
Sun Declination	-14°58'14.2"
Sun Semi-Diameter	16'07.4"
Sun Equatorial Horizontal Parallax	08.9"
Moon Right Ascension	14h31m21.8s
Moon Declination	-15°58'31.8"
Moon Semi-Diameter	16'28.7"
Moon Equatorial Horizontal Parallax	1°00'28.4"
ΔT	46.3 s

== Eclipse season ==
This eclipse is part of an eclipse season, a period, roughly every six months, when eclipses occur. Only two (or occasionally three) eclipse seasons occur each year, and each season lasts about 35 days and repeats just short of six months (173 days) later; thus two full eclipse seasons always occur each year. Either two or three eclipses happen each eclipse season. In the sequence below, each eclipse is separated by a fortnight.

Eclipse season of November 1975
November 3 Ascending node (new moon)	November 18 Descending node (full moon)
Partial solar eclipse Solar Saros 123	Total lunar eclipse Lunar Saros 135

== Related eclipses ==
=== Eclipses in 1975 ===
- A partial solar eclipse on May 11.
- A total lunar eclipse on May 25.
- A partial solar eclipse on November 3.
- A total lunar eclipse on November 18.

=== Metonic ===
- Preceded by: Solar eclipse of January 16, 1972
- Followed by: Solar eclipse of August 22, 1979

=== Tzolkinex ===
- Preceded by: Solar eclipse of September 22, 1968
- Followed by: Solar eclipse of December 15, 1982

=== Half-Saros ===
- Preceded by: Lunar eclipse of October 29, 1966
- Followed by: Lunar eclipse of November 8, 1984

=== Tritos ===
- Preceded by: Solar eclipse of December 4, 1964
- Followed by: Solar eclipse of October 3, 1986

=== Solar Saros 123 ===
- Preceded by: Solar eclipse of October 23, 1957
- Followed by: Solar eclipse of November 13, 1993

=== Inex ===
- Preceded by: Solar eclipse of November 23, 1946
- Followed by: Solar eclipse of October 14, 2004

=== Triad ===
- Preceded by: Solar eclipse of January 1, 1889
- Followed by: Solar eclipse of September 3, 2062

=== Solar eclipses of 1975–1978 ===
This eclipse is a member of a semester series. An eclipse in a semester series of solar eclipses repeats approximately every 177 days and 4 hours (a semester) at alternating nodes of the Moon's orbit.

Solar eclipse series sets from 1975 to 1978
Descending node			Ascending node		
Saros	Map	Gamma	Saros	Map	Gamma
118	May 11, 1975 Partial	1.0647	123	November 3, 1975 Partial	−1.0248
128	April 29, 1976 Annular	0.3378	133	October 23, 1976 Total	−0.327
138	April 18, 1977 Annular	−0.399	143	October 12, 1977 Total	0.3836
148	April 7, 1978 Partial	−1.1081	153	October 2, 1978 Partial	1.1616

=== Saros 123 ===
This eclipse is a part of Saros series 123, repeating every 18 years, 11 days, and containing 70 events. The series started with a partial solar eclipse on April 29, 1074. It contains annular eclipses from July 2, 1182 through April 19, 1651; hybrid eclipses from April 30, 1669 through May 22, 1705; and total eclipses from June 3, 1723 through October 23, 1957. The series ends at member 70 as a partial eclipse on May 31, 2318. Its eclipses are tabulated in three columns; every third eclipse in the same column is one exeligmos apart, so they all cast shadows over approximately the same parts of the Earth.

The longest duration of annularity was produced by member 19 at 8 minutes, 7 seconds on November 9, 1398, and the longest duration of totality was produced by member 42 at 3 minutes, 27 seconds on July 27, 1813. All eclipses in this series occur at the Moon’s ascending node of orbit.

Series members 42–63 occur between 1801 and 2200:
42	43	44
July 27, 1813	August 7, 1831	August 18, 1849
45	46	47
August 29, 1867	September 8, 1885	September 21, 1903
48	49	50
October 1, 1921	October 12, 1939	October 23, 1957
51	52	53
November 3, 1975	November 13, 1993	November 25, 2011
54	55	56
December 5, 2029	December 16, 2047	December 27, 2065
57	58	59
January 7, 2084	January 19, 2102	January 30, 2120
60	61	62
February 9, 2138	February 21, 2156	March 3, 2174
63
March 13, 2192

=== Metonic series ===
The metonic series repeats eclipses every 19 years (6939.69 days), lasting about 5 cycles. Eclipses occur in nearly the same calendar date. In addition, the octon subseries repeats 1/5 of that or every 3.8 years (1387.94 days). All eclipses in this table occur at the Moon's ascending node.

20 eclipse events between June 10, 1964 and August 21, 2036
June 10–11	March 28–29	January 14–16	November 3	August 21–22
117	119	121	123	125
June 10, 1964	March 28, 1968	January 16, 1972	November 3, 1975	August 22, 1979
127	129	131	133	135
June 11, 1983	March 29, 1987	January 15, 1991	November 3, 1994	August 22, 1998
137	139	141	143	145
June 10, 2002	March 29, 2006	January 15, 2010	November 3, 2013	August 21, 2017
147	149	151	153	155
June 10, 2021	March 29, 2025	January 14, 2029	November 3, 2032	August 21, 2036

=== Tritos series ===
This eclipse is a part of a tritos cycle, repeating at alternating nodes every 135 synodic months (≈ 3986.63 days, or 11 years minus 1 month). Their appearance and longitude are irregular due to a lack of synchronization with the anomalistic month (period of perigee), but groupings of 3 tritos cycles (≈ 33 years minus 3 months) come close (≈ 434.044 anomalistic months), so eclipses are similar in these groupings.

Series members between 1801 and 2200
March 14, 1801 (Saros 107)	February 12, 1812 (Saros 108)	January 12, 1823 (Saros 109)		November 10, 1844 (Saros 111)
		August 9, 1877 (Saros 114)	July 9, 1888 (Saros 115)	June 8, 1899 (Saros 116)
May 9, 1910 (Saros 117)	April 8, 1921 (Saros 118)	March 7, 1932 (Saros 119)	February 4, 1943 (Saros 120)	January 5, 1954 (Saros 121)
December 4, 1964 (Saros 122)	November 3, 1975 (Saros 123)	October 3, 1986 (Saros 124)	September 2, 1997 (Saros 125)	August 1, 2008 (Saros 126)
July 2, 2019 (Saros 127)	June 1, 2030 (Saros 128)	April 30, 2041 (Saros 129)	March 30, 2052 (Saros 130)	February 28, 2063 (Saros 131)
January 27, 2074 (Saros 132)	December 27, 2084 (Saros 133)	November 27, 2095 (Saros 134)	October 26, 2106 (Saros 135)	September 26, 2117 (Saros 136)
August 25, 2128 (Saros 137)	July 25, 2139 (Saros 138)	June 25, 2150 (Saros 139)	May 25, 2161 (Saros 140)	April 23, 2172 (Saros 141)
March 23, 2183 (Saros 142)	February 21, 2194 (Saros 143)			

=== Inex series ===
This eclipse is a part of the long period inex cycle, repeating at alternating nodes, every 358 synodic months (≈ 10,571.95 days, or 29 years minus 20 days). Their appearance and longitude are irregular due to a lack of synchronization with the anomalistic month (period of perigee). However, groupings of 3 inex cycles (≈ 87 years minus 2 months) comes close (≈ 1,151.02 anomalistic months), so eclipses are similar in these groupings.

Series members between 1801 and 2200
March 4, 1802 (Saros 117)	February 12, 1831 (Saros 118)	January 23, 1860 (Saros 119)
January 1, 1889 (Saros 120)	December 14, 1917 (Saros 121)	November 23, 1946 (Saros 122)
November 3, 1975 (Saros 123)	October 14, 2004 (Saros 124)	September 23, 2033 (Saros 125)
September 3, 2062 (Saros 126)	August 15, 2091 (Saros 127)	July 25, 2120 (Saros 128)
July 5, 2149 (Saros 129)	June 16, 2178 (Saros 130)	
