= Solar eclipse of August 29, 1867 =

Total eclipse

- Total eclipse
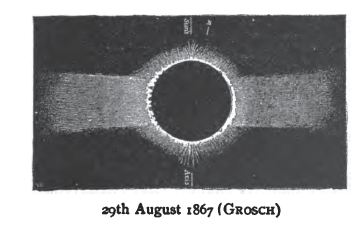

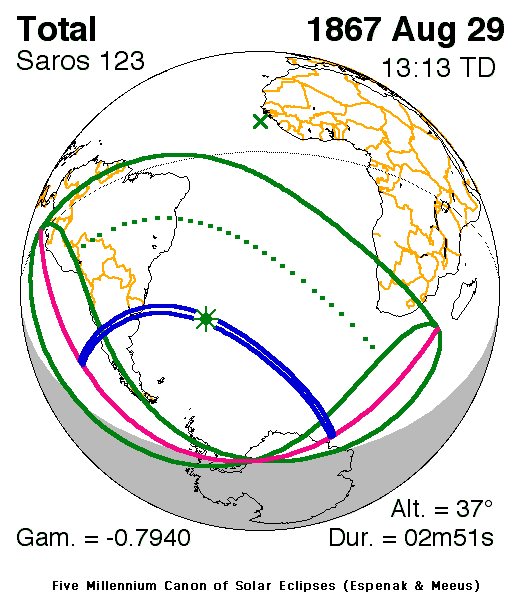
- Map
- Gamma: −0.794
- Magnitude: 1.0344

Maximum eclipse
- Duration: 171 s (2 min 51 s)
- Coordinates: 41.1°S 34.9°W
- Max. width of band: 189 km (117 mi)

Times (UTC)
- Greatest eclipse: 13:13:07

References
- Saros: 123 (45 of 70)
- Catalog # (SE5000): 9205

A total solar eclipse occurred at the Moon's ascending node of orbit on Thursday, August 29, 1867, with a magnitude of 1.0344. A solar eclipse occurs when the Moon passes between Earth and the Sun, thereby totally or partly obscuring the image of the Sun for a viewer on Earth. A total solar eclipse occurs when the Moon's apparent diameter is larger than the Sun's, blocking all direct sunlight, turning day into darkness. Totality occurs in a narrow path across Earth's surface, with the partial solar eclipse visible over a surrounding region thousands of kilometres wide. Occurring about 2.5 days after perigee (on August 27, 1867, at 2:00 UTC), the Moon's apparent diameter was larger.

The path of totality was visible from parts of modern-day Chile, Argentina, and Uruguay. A partial solar eclipse was also visible for parts of South America, Southern Africa, and Antarctica.

== Observations ==
José J. Vergara and Luis Grosch observed the eclipse from a small hill close to Santiago.

== Eclipse details ==
Shown below are two tables displaying details about this particular solar eclipse. The first table outlines times at which the Moon's penumbra or umbra attains the specific parameter, and the second table describes various other parameters pertaining to this eclipse.

August 29, 1867 Solar Eclipse Times
Event	Time (UTC)
First Penumbral External Contact	1867 August 29 at 10:53:07.3 UTC
First Umbral External Contact	1867 August 29 at 12:07:39.8 UTC
First Central Line	1867 August 29 at 12:08:47.2 UTC
First Umbral Internal Contact	1867 August 29 at 12:09:55.3 UTC
Ecliptic Conjunction	1867 August 29 at 13:04:53.8 UTC
Greatest Duration	1867 August 29 at 13:11:07.4 UTC
Greatest Eclipse	1867 August 29 at 13:13:06.8 UTC
Equatorial Conjunction	1867 August 29 at 13:37:17.8 UTC
Last Umbral Internal Contact	1867 August 29 at 14:16:03.1 UTC
Last Central Line	1867 August 29 at 14:17:09.0 UTC
Last Umbral External Contact	1867 August 29 at 14:18:14.1 UTC
Last Penumbral External Contact	1867 August 29 at 15:32:59.4 UTC

August 29, 1867 Solar Eclipse Parameters
Parameter	Value
Eclipse Magnitude	1.03443
Eclipse Obscuration	1.07005
Gamma	−0.79403
Sun Right Ascension	10h29m57.6s
Sun Declination	+09°25'50.6"
Sun Semi-Diameter	15'50.6"
Sun Equatorial Horizontal Parallax	08.7"
Moon Right Ascension	10h29m05.0s
Moon Declination	+08°40'29.6"
Moon Semi-Diameter	16'13.7"
Moon Equatorial Horizontal Parallax	0°59'33.6"
ΔT	3.2 s

== Eclipse season ==
This eclipse is part of an eclipse season, a period, roughly every six months, when eclipses occur. Only two (or occasionally three) eclipse seasons occur each year, and each season lasts about 35 days and repeats just short of six months (173 days) later; thus two full eclipse seasons always occur each year. Either two or three eclipses happen each eclipse season. In the sequence below, each eclipse is separated by a fortnight.

Eclipse season of August–September 1867
August 29 Ascending node (new moon)	September 14 Descending node (full moon)
Total solar eclipse Solar Saros 123	Partial lunar eclipse Lunar Saros 135

== Related eclipses ==
=== Eclipses in 1867 ===
- An annular solar eclipse on March 6.
- A partial lunar eclipse on March 20.
- A total solar eclipse on August 29.
- A partial lunar eclipse on September 14.

=== Metonic ===
- Preceded by: Solar eclipse of November 11, 1863
- Followed by: Solar eclipse of June 18, 1871

=== Tzolkinex ===
- Preceded by: Solar eclipse of July 18, 1860
- Followed by: Solar eclipse of October 10, 1874

=== Half-Saros ===
- Preceded by: Lunar eclipse of August 24, 1858
- Followed by: Lunar eclipse of September 3, 1876

=== Tritos ===
- Preceded by: Solar eclipse of September 29, 1856
- Followed by: Solar eclipse of July 29, 1878

=== Solar Saros 123 ===
- Preceded by: Solar eclipse of August 18, 1849
- Followed by: Solar eclipse of September 8, 1885

=== Inex ===
- Preceded by: Solar eclipse of September 18, 1838
- Followed by: Solar eclipse of August 9, 1896

=== Triad ===
- Preceded by: Solar eclipse of October 27, 1780
- Followed by: Solar eclipse of June 30, 1954

=== Solar eclipses of 1866–1870 ===
This eclipse is a member of a semester series. An eclipse in a semester series of solar eclipses repeats approximately every 177 days and 4 hours (a semester) at alternating nodes of the Moon's orbit.

The partial solar eclipses on April 15, 1866 and October 8, 1866 occur in the previous lunar year eclipse set, and the solar eclipses on June 28, 1870 (partial) and December 22, 1870 (total) occur in the next lunar year eclipse set.

Solar eclipse series sets from 1866 to 1870
Descending node			Ascending node		
Saros	Map	Gamma	Saros	Map	Gamma
108	March 16, 1866 Partial	1.4241	113		
118	March 6, 1867 Annular	0.7716	123	August 29, 1867 Total	−0.7940
128	February 23, 1868 Annular	0.0706	133	August 18, 1868 Total	−0.0443
138	February 11, 1869 Annular	−0.6251	143	August 7, 1869 Total	0.6960
148	January 31, 1870 Partial	−1.2829	153	July 28, 1870 Partial	1.5044

=== Saros 123 ===
This eclipse is a part of Saros series 123, repeating every 18 years, 11 days, and containing 70 events. The series started with a partial solar eclipse on April 29, 1074. It contains annular eclipses from July 2, 1182 through April 19, 1651; hybrid eclipses from April 30, 1669 through May 22, 1705; and total eclipses from June 3, 1723 through October 23, 1957. The series ends at member 70 as a partial eclipse on May 31, 2318. Its eclipses are tabulated in three columns; every third eclipse in the same column is one exeligmos apart, so they all cast shadows over approximately the same parts of the Earth.

The longest duration of annularity was produced by member 19 at 8 minutes, 7 seconds on November 9, 1398, and the longest duration of totality was produced by member 42 at 3 minutes, 27 seconds on July 27, 1813. All eclipses in this series occur at the Moon’s ascending node of orbit.

Series members 42–63 occur between 1801 and 2200:
42	43	44
July 27, 1813	August 7, 1831	August 18, 1849
45	46	47
August 29, 1867	September 8, 1885	September 21, 1903
48	49	50
October 1, 1921	October 12, 1939	October 23, 1957
51	52	53
November 3, 1975	November 13, 1993	November 25, 2011
54	55	56
December 5, 2029	December 16, 2047	December 27, 2065
57	58	59
January 7, 2084	January 19, 2102	January 30, 2120
60	61	62
February 9, 2138	February 21, 2156	March 3, 2174
63
March 13, 2192

=== Metonic series ===
The metonic series repeats eclipses every 19 years (6939.69 days), lasting about 5 cycles. Eclipses occur in nearly the same calendar date. In addition, the octon subseries repeats 1/5 of that or every 3.8 years (1387.94 days). All eclipses in this table occur at the Moon's ascending node.

25 eclipse events between April 5, 1837 and June 17, 1928
April 5–6	January 22–23	November 10–11	August 28–30	June 17–18
107	109	111	113	115
April 5, 1837	January 22, 1841	November 10, 1844	August 28, 1848	June 17, 1852
117	119	121	123	125
April 5, 1856	January 23, 1860	November 11, 1863	August 29, 1867	June 18, 1871
127	129	131	133	135
April 6, 1875	January 22, 1879	November 10, 1882	August 29, 1886	June 17, 1890
137	139	141	143	145
April 6, 1894	January 22, 1898	November 11, 1901	August 30, 1905	June 17, 1909
147	149	151	153	155
April 6, 1913	January 23, 1917	November 10, 1920	August 30, 1924	June 17, 1928

=== Tritos series ===
This eclipse is a part of a tritos cycle, repeating at alternating nodes every 135 synodic months (≈ 3986.63 days, or 11 years minus 1 month). Their appearance and longitude are irregular due to a lack of synchronization with the anomalistic month (period of perigee), but groupings of 3 tritos cycles (≈ 33 years minus 3 months) come close (≈ 434.044 anomalistic months), so eclipses are similar in these groupings.

Series members between 1801 and 2200
March 4, 1802 (Saros 117)	February 1, 1813 (Saros 118)	January 1, 1824 (Saros 119)	November 30, 1834 (Saros 120)	October 30, 1845 (Saros 121)
September 29, 1856 (Saros 122)	August 29, 1867 (Saros 123)	July 29, 1878 (Saros 124)	June 28, 1889 (Saros 125)	May 28, 1900 (Saros 126)
April 28, 1911 (Saros 127)	March 28, 1922 (Saros 128)	February 24, 1933 (Saros 129)	January 25, 1944 (Saros 130)	December 25, 1954 (Saros 131)
November 23, 1965 (Saros 132)	October 23, 1976 (Saros 133)	September 23, 1987 (Saros 134)	August 22, 1998 (Saros 135)	July 22, 2009 (Saros 136)
June 21, 2020 (Saros 137)	May 21, 2031 (Saros 138)	April 20, 2042 (Saros 139)	March 20, 2053 (Saros 140)	February 17, 2064 (Saros 141)
January 16, 2075 (Saros 142)	December 16, 2085 (Saros 143)	November 15, 2096 (Saros 144)	October 16, 2107 (Saros 145)	September 15, 2118 (Saros 146)
August 15, 2129 (Saros 147)	July 14, 2140 (Saros 148)	June 14, 2151 (Saros 149)	May 14, 2162 (Saros 150)	April 12, 2173 (Saros 151)
March 12, 2184 (Saros 152)	February 10, 2195 (Saros 153)			

=== Inex series ===
This eclipse is a part of the long period inex cycle, repeating at alternating nodes, every 358 synodic months (≈ 10,571.95 days, or 29 years minus 20 days). Their appearance and longitude are irregular due to a lack of synchronization with the anomalistic month (period of perigee). However, groupings of 3 inex cycles (≈ 87 years minus 2 months) comes close (≈ 1,151.02 anomalistic months), so eclipses are similar in these groupings.

Series members between 1801 and 2200
October 9, 1809 (Saros 121)	September 18, 1838 (Saros 122)	August 29, 1867 (Saros 123)
August 9, 1896 (Saros 124)	July 20, 1925 (Saros 125)	June 30, 1954 (Saros 126)
June 11, 1983 (Saros 127)	May 20, 2012 (Saros 128)	April 30, 2041 (Saros 129)
April 11, 2070 (Saros 130)	March 21, 2099 (Saros 131)	March 1, 2128 (Saros 132)
February 9, 2157 (Saros 133)	January 20, 2186 (Saros 134)	
