= Solar eclipse of September 8, 1885 =

Total eclipse

- Total eclipse
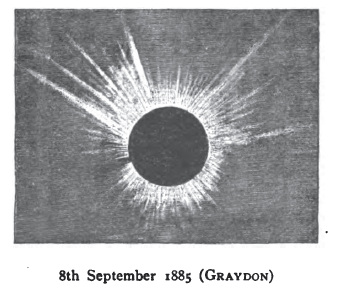

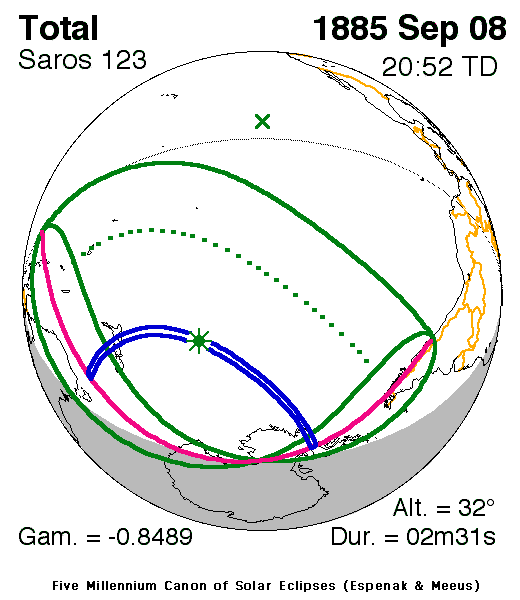
- Map
- Gamma: −0.8489
- Magnitude: 1.0332

Maximum eclipse
- Duration: 151 s (2 min 31 s)
- Coordinates: 49.6°S 156.5°W
- Max. width of band: 211 km (131 mi)

Times (UTC)
- Greatest eclipse: 20:51:52

References
- Saros: 123 (46 of 70)
- Catalog # (SE5000): 9247

A total solar eclipse occurred at the Moon's ascending node of orbit on Tuesday, September 8, 1885, with a magnitude of 1.0332. A solar eclipse occurs when the Moon passes between Earth and the Sun, thereby totally or partly obscuring the image of the Sun for a viewer on Earth. A total solar eclipse occurs when the Moon's apparent diameter is larger than the Sun's, blocking all direct sunlight, turning day into darkness. Totality occurs in a narrow path across Earth's surface, with the partial solar eclipse visible over a surrounding region thousands of kilometres wide. Occurring about 2.3 days after perigee (on September 6, 1885, at 14:05 UTC), the Moon's apparent diameter was larger.

The path of totality was visible from parts of modern-day New Zealand and Antarctica. A partial solar eclipse was also visible for parts of Oceania, Antarctica, and southern South America.

== Eclipse details ==
Shown below are two tables displaying details about this particular solar eclipse. The first table outlines times at which the Moon's penumbra or umbra attains the specific parameter, and the second table describes various other parameters pertaining to this eclipse.

September 8, 1885 Solar Eclipse Times
Event	Time (UTC)
First Penumbral External Contact	1885 September 8 at 18:35:56.3 UTC
First Umbral External Contact	1885 September 8 at 19:54:54.3 UTC
First Central Line	1885 September 8 at 19:56:11.9 UTC
First Umbral Internal Contact	1885 September 8 at 19:57:30.8 UTC
Ecliptic Conjunction	1885 September 8 at 20:43:07.3 UTC
Greatest Duration	1885 September 8 at 20:50:23.2 UTC
Greatest Eclipse	1885 September 8 at 20:51:51.9 UTC
Equatorial Conjunction	1885 September 8 at 21:19:51.3 UTC
Last Umbral Internal Contact	1885 September 8 at 21:45:54.9 UTC
Last Central Line	1885 September 8 at 21:47:11.6 UTC
Last Umbral External Contact	1885 September 8 at 21:48:27.1 UTC
Last Penumbral External Contact	1885 September 8 at 23:07:38.7 UTC

September 8, 1885 Solar Eclipse Parameters
Parameter	Value
Eclipse Magnitude	1.03319
Eclipse Obscuration	1.06749
Gamma	−0.84889
Sun Right Ascension	11h09m38.6s
Sun Declination	+05°24'05.1"
Sun Semi-Diameter	15'53.2"
Sun Equatorial Horizontal Parallax	08.7"
Moon Right Ascension	11h08m38.3s
Moon Declination	+04°35'47.3"
Moon Semi-Diameter	16'16.5"
Moon Equatorial Horizontal Parallax	0°59'43.9"
ΔT	-5.8 s

== Eclipse season ==
This eclipse is part of an eclipse season, a period, roughly every six months, when eclipses occur. Only two (or occasionally three) eclipse seasons occur each year, and each season lasts about 35 days and repeats just short of six months (173 days) later; thus two full eclipse seasons always occur each year. Either two or three eclipses happen each eclipse season. In the sequence below, each eclipse is separated by a fortnight.

Eclipse season of September 1885
September 8 Ascending node (new moon)	September 24 Descending node (full moon)
Total solar eclipse Solar Saros 123	Partial lunar eclipse Lunar Saros 135

== Related eclipses ==
=== Eclipses in 1885 ===
- An annular solar eclipse on March 16.
- A partial lunar eclipse on March 30.
- A total solar eclipse on September 8.
- A partial lunar eclipse on September 24.

=== Metonic ===
- Preceded by: Solar eclipse of November 21, 1881
- Followed by: Solar eclipse of June 28, 1889

=== Tzolkinex ===
- Preceded by: Solar eclipse of July 29, 1878
- Followed by: Solar eclipse of October 20, 1892

=== Half-Saros ===
- Preceded by: Lunar eclipse of September 3, 1876
- Followed by: Lunar eclipse of September 15, 1894

=== Tritos ===
- Preceded by: Solar eclipse of October 10, 1874
- Followed by: Solar eclipse of August 9, 1896

=== Solar Saros 123 ===
- Preceded by: Solar eclipse of August 29, 1867
- Followed by: Solar eclipse of September 21, 1903

=== Inex ===
- Preceded by: Solar eclipse of September 29, 1856
- Followed by: Solar eclipse of August 21, 1914

=== Triad ===
- Preceded by: Solar eclipse of November 8, 1798
- Followed by: Solar eclipse of July 10, 1972

=== Solar eclipses of 1884–1888 ===
This eclipse is a member of a semester series. An eclipse in a semester series of solar eclipses repeats approximately every 177 days and 4 hours (a semester) at alternating nodes of the Moon's orbit.

The partial solar eclipses on April 25, 1884 and October 19, 1884 occur in the previous lunar year eclipse set, and the partial solar eclipse on July 9, 1888 occurs in the next lunar year eclipse set.

Solar eclipse series sets from 1884 to 1888
Descending node			Ascending node		
Saros	Map	Gamma	Saros	Map	Gamma
108	March 27, 1884 Partial	1.4602	113		
118	March 16, 1885 Annular	0.8030	123	September 8, 1885 Total	−0.8489
128	March 5, 1886 Annular	0.0970	133	August 29, 1886 Total	−0.1059
138	February 22, 1887 Annular	−0.6040	143	August 19, 1887 Total	0.6312
148	February 11, 1888 Partial	−1.2684	153	August 7, 1888 Partial	−1.2797

=== Saros 123 ===
This eclipse is a part of Saros series 123, repeating every 18 years, 11 days, and containing 70 events. The series started with a partial solar eclipse on April 29, 1074. It contains annular eclipses from July 2, 1182 through April 19, 1651; hybrid eclipses from April 30, 1669 through May 22, 1705; and total eclipses from June 3, 1723 through October 23, 1957. The series ends at member 70 as a partial eclipse on May 31, 2318. Its eclipses are tabulated in three columns; every third eclipse in the same column is one exeligmos apart, so they all cast shadows over approximately the same parts of the Earth.

The longest duration of annularity was produced by member 19 at 8 minutes, 7 seconds on November 9, 1398, and the longest duration of totality was produced by member 42 at 3 minutes, 27 seconds on July 27, 1813. All eclipses in this series occur at the Moon’s ascending node of orbit.

Series members 42–63 occur between 1801 and 2200:
42	43	44
July 27, 1813	August 7, 1831	August 18, 1849
45	46	47
August 29, 1867	September 8, 1885	September 21, 1903
48	49	50
October 1, 1921	October 12, 1939	October 23, 1957
51	52	53
November 3, 1975	November 13, 1993	November 25, 2011
54	55	56
December 5, 2029	December 16, 2047	December 27, 2065
57	58	59
January 7, 2084	January 19, 2102	January 30, 2120
60	61	62
February 9, 2138	February 21, 2156	March 3, 2174
63
March 13, 2192

=== Metonic series ===
The metonic series repeats eclipses every 19 years (6939.69 days), lasting about 5 cycles. Eclipses occur in nearly the same calendar date. In addition, the octon subseries repeats 1/5 of that or every 3.8 years (1387.94 days). All eclipses in this table occur at the Moon's ascending node.

23 eclipse events between February 3, 1859 and June 29, 1946
February 1–3	November 21–22	September 8–10	June 28–29	April 16–18
109	111	113	115	117
February 3, 1859	November 21, 1862		June 28, 1870	April 16, 1874
119	121	123	125	127
February 2, 1878	November 21, 1881	September 8, 1885	June 28, 1889	April 16, 1893
129	131	133	135	137
February 1, 1897	November 22, 1900	September 9, 1904	June 28, 1908	April 17, 1912
139	141	143	145	147
February 3, 1916	November 22, 1919	September 10, 1923	June 29, 1927	April 18, 1931
149	151	153	155	
February 3, 1935	November 21, 1938	September 10, 1942	June 29, 1946	

=== Tritos series ===
This eclipse is a part of a tritos cycle, repeating at alternating nodes every 135 synodic months (≈ 3986.63 days, or 11 years minus 1 month). Their appearance and longitude are irregular due to a lack of synchronization with the anomalistic month (period of perigee), but groupings of 3 tritos cycles (≈ 33 years minus 3 months) come close (≈ 434.044 anomalistic months), so eclipses are similar in these groupings.

Series members between 1801 and 2200
April 14, 1809 (Saros 116)	March 14, 1820 (Saros 117)	February 12, 1831 (Saros 118)	January 11, 1842 (Saros 119)	December 11, 1852 (Saros 120)
November 11, 1863 (Saros 121)	October 10, 1874 (Saros 122)	September 8, 1885 (Saros 123)	August 9, 1896 (Saros 124)	July 10, 1907 (Saros 125)
June 8, 1918 (Saros 126)	May 9, 1929 (Saros 127)	April 7, 1940 (Saros 128)	March 7, 1951 (Saros 129)	February 5, 1962 (Saros 130)
January 4, 1973 (Saros 131)	December 4, 1983 (Saros 132)	November 3, 1994 (Saros 133)	October 3, 2005 (Saros 134)	September 1, 2016 (Saros 135)
August 2, 2027 (Saros 136)	July 2, 2038 (Saros 137)	May 31, 2049 (Saros 138)	April 30, 2060 (Saros 139)	March 31, 2071 (Saros 140)
February 27, 2082 (Saros 141)	January 27, 2093 (Saros 142)	December 29, 2103 (Saros 143)	November 27, 2114 (Saros 144)	October 26, 2125 (Saros 145)
September 26, 2136 (Saros 146)	August 26, 2147 (Saros 147)	July 25, 2158 (Saros 148)	June 25, 2169 (Saros 149)	May 24, 2180 (Saros 150)
April 23, 2191 (Saros 151)

=== Inex series ===
This eclipse is a part of the long period inex cycle, repeating at alternating nodes, every 358 synodic months (≈ 10,571.95 days, or 29 years minus 20 days). Their appearance and longitude are irregular due to a lack of synchronization with the anomalistic month (period of perigee). However, groupings of 3 inex cycles (≈ 87 years minus 2 months) comes close (≈ 1,151.02 anomalistic months), so eclipses are similar in these groupings.

Series members between 1801 and 2200
October 20, 1827 (Saros 121)	September 29, 1856 (Saros 122)	September 8, 1885 (Saros 123)
August 21, 1914 (Saros 124)	August 1, 1943 (Saros 125)	July 10, 1972 (Saros 126)
June 21, 2001 (Saros 127)	June 1, 2030 (Saros 128)	May 11, 2059 (Saros 129)
April 21, 2088 (Saros 130)	April 2, 2117 (Saros 131)	March 12, 2146 (Saros 132)
February 21, 2175 (Saros 133)		
