= Solar eclipse of December 14, 1917 =

20th-century annular solar eclipse

- Annular eclipse
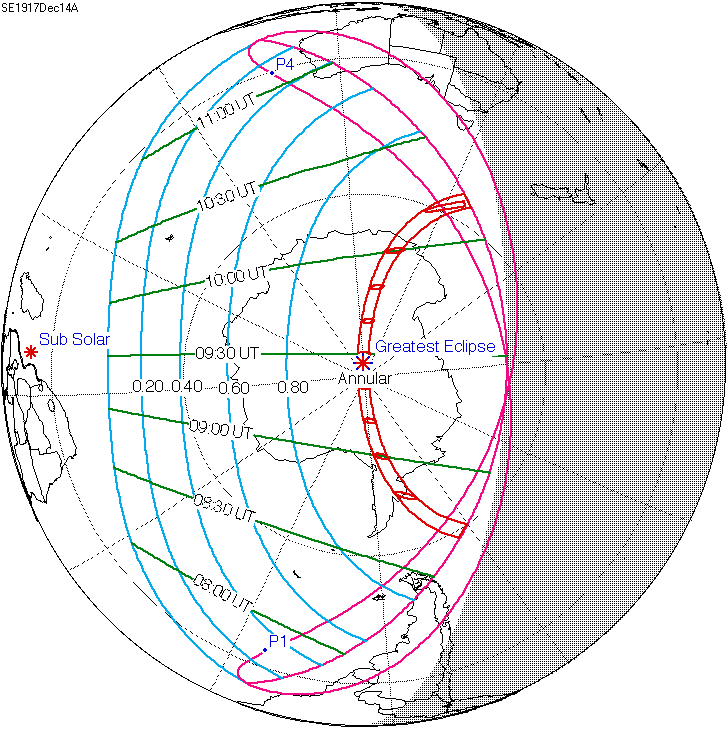
- Map
- Gamma: −0.9157
- Magnitude: 0.9791

Maximum eclipse
- Duration: 77 s (1 min 17 s)
- Coordinates: 88°S 124.8°E
- Max. width of band: 189 km (117 mi)

Times (UTC)
- Greatest eclipse: 9:27:20

References
- Saros: 121 (55 of 71)
- Catalog # (SE5000): 9323

An annular solar eclipse occurred at the Moon's ascending node of orbit on Friday, December 14, 1917, with a magnitude of 0.9791. A solar eclipse occurs when the Moon passes between Earth and the Sun, thereby totally or partly obscuring the image of the Sun for a viewer on Earth. An annular solar eclipse occurs when the Moon's apparent diameter is smaller than the Sun's, blocking most of the Sun's light and causing the Sun to look like an annulus (ring). An annular eclipse appears as a partial eclipse over a region of the Earth thousands of kilometres wide. Occurring 4.6 days before apogee (on December 18, 1917, at 22:10 UTC), the Moon's apparent diameter was smaller.

This was the last of four solar eclipses in 1917, with the others occurring on January 23, June 19 and July 19.

The path of annularity crossed Antarctica. A partial eclipse was visible for parts of Antarctica, southern South America, and Australia. This annular eclipse is notable in that the path of annularity passed over the South Pole.

== Eclipse details ==
Shown below are two tables displaying details about this particular solar eclipse. The first table outlines times at which the Moon's penumbra or umbra attains the specific parameter, and the second table describes various other parameters pertaining to this eclipse.

December 14, 1917 Solar Eclipse Times
Event	Time (UTC)
First Penumbral External Contact	1917 December 14 at 07:09:48.7 UTC
First Umbral External Contact	1917 December 14 at 08:41:49.9 UTC
First Central Line	1917 December 14 at 08:43:56.6 UTC
Greatest Duration	1917 December 14 at 08:43:56.6 UTC
First Umbral Internal Contact	1917 December 14 at 08:46:08.6 UTC
Ecliptic Conjunction	1917 December 14 at 09:17:22.8 UTC
Equatorial Conjunction	1917 December 14 at 09:23:35.1 UTC
Greatest Eclipse	1917 December 14 at 09:27:19.7 UTC
Last Umbral Internal Contact	1917 December 14 at 10:08:36.2 UTC
Last Central Line	1917 December 14 at 10:10:45.3 UTC
Last Umbral External Contact	1917 December 14 at 10:12:49.1 UTC
Last Penumbral External Contact	1917 December 14 at 11:44:46.7 UTC

December 14, 1917 Solar Eclipse Parameters
Parameter	Value
Eclipse Magnitude	0.97913
Eclipse Obscuration	0.95870
Gamma	–0.91566
Sun Right Ascension	17h24m28.1s
Sun Declination	-23°11'55.0"
Sun Semi-Diameter	16'15.0"
Sun Equatorial Horizontal Parallax	08.9"
Moon Right Ascension	17h24m36.7s
Moon Declination	-24°04'53.4"
Moon Semi-Diameter	15'48.9"
Moon Equatorial Horizontal Parallax	0°58'02.6"
ΔT	20.2 s

== Eclipse season ==
This eclipse is part of an eclipse season, a period, roughly every six months, when eclipses occur. Only two (or occasionally three) eclipse seasons occur each year, and each season lasts about 35 days and repeats just short of six months (173 days) later; thus two full eclipse seasons always occur each year. Either two or three eclipses happen each eclipse season. In the sequence below, each eclipse is separated by a fortnight.

Eclipse season of December 1917
December 14 Ascending node (new moon)	December 28 Descending node (full moon)
Annular solar eclipse Solar Saros 121	Total lunar eclipse Lunar Saros 133

== Related eclipses ==
=== Eclipses in 1917 ===
- A total lunar eclipse on January 8.
- A partial solar eclipse on January 23.
- A partial solar eclipse on June 19.
- A total lunar eclipse on July 4.
- A partial solar eclipse on July 19.
- An annular solar eclipse on December 14.
- A total lunar eclipse on December 28.

=== Metonic ===
- Preceded by: Solar eclipse of February 25, 1914
- Followed by: Solar eclipse of October 1, 1921

=== Tzolkinex ===
- Preceded by: Solar eclipse of November 2, 1910
- Followed by: Solar eclipse of January 24, 1925

=== Half-Saros ===
- Preceded by: Lunar eclipse of December 7, 1908
- Followed by: Lunar eclipse of December 19, 1926

=== Tritos ===
- Preceded by: Solar eclipse of January 14, 1907
- Followed by: Solar eclipse of November 12, 1928

=== Solar Saros 121 ===
- Preceded by: Solar eclipse of December 3, 1899
- Followed by: Solar eclipse of December 25, 1935

=== Inex ===
- Preceded by: Solar eclipse of January 1, 1889
- Followed by: Solar eclipse of November 23, 1946

=== Triad ===
- Preceded by: Solar eclipse of February 12, 1831
- Followed by: Solar eclipse of October 14, 2004

=== Solar eclipses of 1916–1920 ===
This eclipse is a member of a semester series. An eclipse in a semester series of solar eclipses repeats approximately every 177 days and 4 hours (a semester) at alternating nodes of the Moon's orbit.

The solar eclipses on February 3, 1916 (total), July 30, 1916 (annular), January 23, 1917 (partial), and July 19, 1917 (partial) occur in the previous lunar year eclipse set.

Solar eclipse series sets from 1916 to 1920
Ascending node			Descending node		
Saros	Map	Gamma	Saros	Map	Gamma
111	December 24, 1916 Partial	−1.5321	116	June 19, 1917 Partial	1.2857
121	December 14, 1917 Annular	−0.9157	126	June 8, 1918 Total	0.4658
131	December 3, 1918 Annular	−0.2387	136 Totality in Príncipe	May 29, 1919 Total	−0.2955
141	November 22, 1919 Annular	0.4549	146	May 18, 1920 Partial	−1.0239
151	November 10, 1920 Partial	1.1287			

=== Saros 121 ===
This eclipse is a part of Saros series 121, repeating every 18 years, 11 days, and containing 71 events. The series started with a partial solar eclipse on April 25, 944 AD. It contains total eclipses from July 10, 1070 through October 9, 1809; hybrid eclipses on October 20, 1827 and October 30, 1845; and annular eclipses from November 11, 1863 through February 28, 2044. The series ends at member 71 as a partial eclipse on June 7, 2206. Its eclipses are tabulated in three columns; every third eclipse in the same column is one exeligmos apart, so they all cast shadows over approximately the same parts of the Earth.

The longest duration of totality was produced by member 39 at 6 minutes, 20 seconds on June 21, 1629, and the longest duration of annularity will be produced by member 62 at 2 minutes, 27 seconds on February 28, 2044. All eclipses in this series occur at the Moon’s ascending node of orbit.

Series members 49–70 occur between 1801 and 2200:
49	50	51
October 9, 1809	October 20, 1827	October 30, 1845
52	53	54
November 11, 1863	November 21, 1881	December 3, 1899
55	56	57
December 14, 1917	December 25, 1935	January 5, 1954
58	59	60
January 16, 1972	January 26, 1990	February 7, 2008
61	62	63
February 17, 2026	February 28, 2044	March 11, 2062
64	65	66
March 21, 2080	April 1, 2098	April 13, 2116
67	68	69
April 24, 2134	May 4, 2152	May 16, 2170
70
May 26, 2188

=== Metonic series ===
The metonic series repeats eclipses every 19 years (6939.69 days), lasting about 5 cycles. Eclipses occur in nearly the same calendar date. In addition, the octon subseries repeats 1/5 of that or every 3.8 years (1387.94 days). All eclipses in this table occur at the Moon's ascending node.

22 eclipse events between December 13, 1898 and July 20, 1982
December 13–14	October 1–2	July 20–21	May 9	February 24–25
111	113	115	117	119
December 13, 1898		July 21, 1906	May 9, 1910	February 25, 1914
121	123	125	127	129
December 14, 1917	October 1, 1921	July 20, 1925	May 9, 1929	February 24, 1933
131	133	135	137	139
December 13, 1936	October 1, 1940	July 20, 1944	May 9, 1948	February 25, 1952
141	143	145	147	149
December 14, 1955	October 2, 1959	July 20, 1963	May 9, 1967	February 25, 1971
151	153	155		
December 13, 1974	October 2, 1978	July 20, 1982		

=== Tritos series ===
This eclipse is a part of a tritos cycle, repeating at alternating nodes every 135 synodic months (≈ 3986.63 days, or 11 years minus 1 month). Their appearance and longitude are irregular due to a lack of synchronization with the anomalistic month (period of perigee), but groupings of 3 tritos cycles (≈ 33 years minus 3 months) come close (≈ 434.044 anomalistic months), so eclipses are similar in these groupings.

Series members between 1801 and 2200
October 19, 1808 (Saros 111)	September 19, 1819 (Saros 112)	August 18, 1830 (Saros 113)	July 18, 1841 (Saros 114)	June 17, 1852 (Saros 115)
May 17, 1863 (Saros 116)	April 16, 1874 (Saros 117)	March 16, 1885 (Saros 118)	February 13, 1896 (Saros 119)	January 14, 1907 (Saros 120)
December 14, 1917 (Saros 121)	November 12, 1928 (Saros 122)	October 12, 1939 (Saros 123)	September 12, 1950 (Saros 124)	August 11, 1961 (Saros 125)
July 10, 1972 (Saros 126)	June 11, 1983 (Saros 127)	May 10, 1994 (Saros 128)	April 8, 2005 (Saros 129)	March 9, 2016 (Saros 130)
February 6, 2027 (Saros 131)	January 5, 2038 (Saros 132)	December 5, 2048 (Saros 133)	November 5, 2059 (Saros 134)	October 4, 2070 (Saros 135)
September 3, 2081 (Saros 136)	August 3, 2092 (Saros 137)	July 4, 2103 (Saros 138)	June 3, 2114 (Saros 139)	May 3, 2125 (Saros 140)
April 1, 2136 (Saros 141)	March 2, 2147 (Saros 142)	January 30, 2158 (Saros 143)	December 29, 2168 (Saros 144)	November 28, 2179 (Saros 145)
October 29, 2190 (Saros 146)

=== Inex series ===
This eclipse is a part of the long period inex cycle, repeating at alternating nodes, every 358 synodic months (≈ 10,571.95 days, or 29 years minus 20 days). Their appearance and longitude are irregular due to a lack of synchronization with the anomalistic month (period of perigee). However, groupings of 3 inex cycles (≈ 87 years minus 2 months) comes close (≈ 1,151.02 anomalistic months), so eclipses are similar in these groupings.

Series members between 1801 and 2200
March 4, 1802 (Saros 117)	February 12, 1831 (Saros 118)	January 23, 1860 (Saros 119)
January 1, 1889 (Saros 120)	December 14, 1917 (Saros 121)	November 23, 1946 (Saros 122)
November 3, 1975 (Saros 123)	October 14, 2004 (Saros 124)	September 23, 2033 (Saros 125)
September 3, 2062 (Saros 126)	August 15, 2091 (Saros 127)	July 25, 2120 (Saros 128)
July 5, 2149 (Saros 129)	June 16, 2178 (Saros 130)	
