= Solar eclipse of October 12, 1939 =

Total eclipse

- Total eclipse
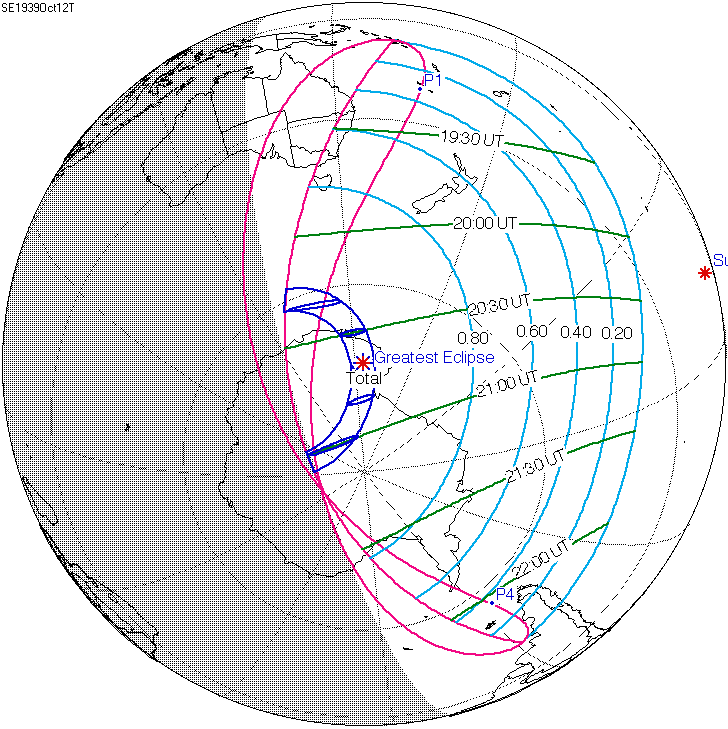
- Map
- Gamma: −0.9737
- Magnitude: 1.0266

Maximum eclipse
- Duration: 92 s (1 min 32 s)
- Coordinates: 72.8°S 155.1°E
- Max. width of band: 418 km (260 mi)

Times (UTC)
- Greatest eclipse: 20:40:23

References
- Saros: 123 (49 of 70)
- Catalog # (SE5000): 9374

A total solar eclipse occurred at the Moon's ascending node of orbit on Thursday, October 12, 1939, with a magnitude of 1.0266. A solar eclipse occurs when the Moon passes between Earth and the Sun, thereby totally or partly obscuring the image of the Sun for a viewer on Earth. A total solar eclipse occurs when the Moon's apparent diameter is larger than the Sun's, blocking all direct sunlight, turning day into darkness. Totality occurs in a narrow path across Earth's surface, with the partial solar eclipse visible over a surrounding region thousands of kilometres wide. Occurring about 1.8 days after perigee (on October 11, 1939, at 2:30 UTC), the Moon's apparent diameter was larger.

Totality was visible for a part of Antarctica. A partial eclipse was visible for parts of Eastern Australia, Oceania, extreme southern South America, and Antarctica.

== Eclipse details ==
Shown below are two tables displaying details about this particular solar eclipse. The first table outlines times at which the Moon's penumbra or umbra attains the specific parameter, and the second table describes various other parameters pertaining to this eclipse.

October 12, 1939 Solar Eclipse Times
Event	Time (UTC)
First Penumbral External Contact	1939 October 12 at 18:35:06.1 UTC
First Umbral External Contact	1939 October 12 at 20:14:48.5 UTC
First Central Line	1939 October 12 at 20:17:38.1 UTC
First Umbral Internal Contact	1939 October 12 at 20:20:50.7 UTC
Ecliptic Conjunction	1939 October 12 at 20:30:28.6 UTC
Greatest Duration	1939 October 12 at 20:39:46.3 UTC
Greatest Eclipse	1939 October 12 at 20:40:23.4 UTC
Equatorial Conjunction	1939 October 12 at 21:11:17.5 UTC
Last Umbral Internal Contact	1939 October 12 at 20:59:35.3 UTC
Last Central Line	1939 October 12 at 21:02:46.1 UTC
Last Umbral External Contact	1939 October 12 at 21:05:33.9 UTC
Last Penumbral External Contact	1939 October 12 at 22:45:29.8 UTC

October 12, 1939 Solar Eclipse Parameters
Parameter	Value
Eclipse Magnitude	1.02657
Eclipse Obscuration	1.05385
Gamma	−0.97370
Sun Right Ascension	13h08m41.4s
Sun Declination	-07°17'47.8"
Sun Semi-Diameter	16'01.7"
Sun Equatorial Horizontal Parallax	08.8"
Moon Right Ascension	13h07m33.1s
Moon Declination	-08°13'46.1"
Moon Semi-Diameter	16'24.2"
Moon Equatorial Horizontal Parallax	1°00'12.1"
ΔT	24.3 s

== Eclipse season ==
This eclipse is part of an eclipse season, a period, roughly every six months, when eclipses occur. Only two (or occasionally three) eclipse seasons occur each year, and each season lasts about 35 days and repeats just short of six months (173 days) later; thus two full eclipse seasons always occur each year. Either two or three eclipses happen each eclipse season. In the sequence below, each eclipse is separated by a fortnight.

Eclipse season of October 1939
October 12 Ascending node (new moon)	October 28 Descending node (full moon)
Total solar eclipse Solar Saros 123	Partial lunar eclipse Lunar Saros 135

== Related eclipses ==
=== Eclipses in 1939 ===
- An annular solar eclipse on April 19.
- A total lunar eclipse on May 3.
- A total solar eclipse on October 12.
- A partial lunar eclipse on October 28.

=== Metonic ===
- Preceded by: Solar eclipse of December 25, 1935
- Followed by: Solar eclipse of August 1, 1943

=== Tzolkinex ===
- Preceded by: Solar eclipse of August 31, 1932
- Followed by: Solar eclipse of November 23, 1946

=== Half-Saros ===
- Preceded by: Lunar eclipse of October 7, 1930
- Followed by: Lunar eclipse of October 18, 1948

=== Tritos ===
- Preceded by: Solar eclipse of November 12, 1928
- Followed by: Solar eclipse of September 12, 1950

=== Solar Saros 123 ===
- Preceded by: Solar eclipse of October 1, 1921
- Followed by: Solar eclipse of October 23, 1957

=== Inex ===
- Preceded by: Solar eclipse of November 2, 1910
- Followed by: Solar eclipse of September 22, 1968

=== Triad ===
- Preceded by: Solar eclipse of December 11, 1852
- Followed by: Solar eclipse of August 12, 2026

=== Solar eclipses of 1939–1942 ===
This eclipse is a member of a semester series. An eclipse in a semester series of solar eclipses repeats approximately every 177 days and 4 hours (a semester) at alternating nodes of the Moon's orbit.

The partial solar eclipse on August 12, 1942 occurs in the next lunar year eclipse set.

Solar eclipse series sets from 1939 to 1942
Descending node			Ascending node		
Saros	Map	Gamma	Saros	Map	Gamma
118	April 19, 1939 Annular	0.9388	123	October 12, 1939 Total	−0.9737
128	April 7, 1940 Annular	0.219	133	October 1, 1940 Total	−0.2573
138	March 27, 1941 Annular	−0.5025	143	September 21, 1941 Total	0.4649
148	March 16, 1942 Partial	−1.1908	153	September 10, 1942 Partial	1.2571

=== Saros 123 ===
This eclipse is a part of Saros series 123, repeating every 18 years, 11 days, and containing 70 events. The series started with a partial solar eclipse on April 29, 1074. It contains annular eclipses from July 2, 1182 through April 19, 1651; hybrid eclipses from April 30, 1669 through May 22, 1705; and total eclipses from June 3, 1723 through October 23, 1957. The series ends at member 70 as a partial eclipse on May 31, 2318. Its eclipses are tabulated in three columns; every third eclipse in the same column is one exeligmos apart, so they all cast shadows over approximately the same parts of the Earth.

The longest duration of annularity was produced by member 19 at 8 minutes, 7 seconds on November 9, 1398, and the longest duration of totality was produced by member 42 at 3 minutes, 27 seconds on July 27, 1813. All eclipses in this series occur at the Moon’s ascending node of orbit.

Series members 42–63 occur between 1801 and 2200:
42	43	44
July 27, 1813	August 7, 1831	August 18, 1849
45	46	47
August 29, 1867	September 8, 1885	September 21, 1903
48	49	50
October 1, 1921	October 12, 1939	October 23, 1957
51	52	53
November 3, 1975	November 13, 1993	November 25, 2011
54	55	56
December 5, 2029	December 16, 2047	December 27, 2065
57	58	59
January 7, 2084	January 19, 2102	January 30, 2120
60	61	62
February 9, 2138	February 21, 2156	March 3, 2174
63
March 13, 2192

=== Metonic series ===
The metonic series repeats eclipses every 19 years (6939.69 days), lasting about 5 cycles. Eclipses occur in nearly the same calendar date. In addition, the octon subseries repeats 1/5 of that or every 3.8 years (1387.94 days). All eclipses in this table occur at the Moon's ascending node.

22 eclipse events between December 24, 1916 and July 31, 2000
December 24–25	October 12	July 31–August 1	May 19–20	March 7
111	113	115	117	119
December 24, 1916		July 31, 1924	May 19, 1928	March 7, 1932
121	123	125	127	129
December 25, 1935	October 12, 1939	August 1, 1943	May 20, 1947	March 7, 1951
131	133	135	137	139
December 25, 1954	October 12, 1958	July 31, 1962	May 20, 1966	March 7, 1970
141	143	145	147	149
December 24, 1973	October 12, 1977	July 31, 1981	May 19, 1985	March 7, 1989
151	153	155		
December 24, 1992	October 12, 1996	July 31, 2000		

=== Tritos series ===
This eclipse is a part of a tritos cycle, repeating at alternating nodes every 135 synodic months (≈ 3986.63 days, or 11 years minus 1 month). Their appearance and longitude are irregular due to a lack of synchronization with the anomalistic month (period of perigee), but groupings of 3 tritos cycles (≈ 33 years minus 3 months) come close (≈ 434.044 anomalistic months), so eclipses are similar in these groupings.

Series members between 1801 and 2200
October 19, 1808 (Saros 111)	September 19, 1819 (Saros 112)	August 18, 1830 (Saros 113)	July 18, 1841 (Saros 114)	June 17, 1852 (Saros 115)
May 17, 1863 (Saros 116)	April 16, 1874 (Saros 117)	March 16, 1885 (Saros 118)	February 13, 1896 (Saros 119)	January 14, 1907 (Saros 120)
December 14, 1917 (Saros 121)	November 12, 1928 (Saros 122)	October 12, 1939 (Saros 123)	September 12, 1950 (Saros 124)	August 11, 1961 (Saros 125)
July 10, 1972 (Saros 126)	June 11, 1983 (Saros 127)	May 10, 1994 (Saros 128)	April 8, 2005 (Saros 129)	March 9, 2016 (Saros 130)
February 6, 2027 (Saros 131)	January 5, 2038 (Saros 132)	December 5, 2048 (Saros 133)	November 5, 2059 (Saros 134)	October 4, 2070 (Saros 135)
September 3, 2081 (Saros 136)	August 3, 2092 (Saros 137)	July 4, 2103 (Saros 138)	June 3, 2114 (Saros 139)	May 3, 2125 (Saros 140)
April 1, 2136 (Saros 141)	March 2, 2147 (Saros 142)	January 30, 2158 (Saros 143)	December 29, 2168 (Saros 144)	November 28, 2179 (Saros 145)
October 29, 2190 (Saros 146)

=== Inex series ===
This eclipse is a part of the long period inex cycle, repeating at alternating nodes, every 358 synodic months (≈ 10,571.95 days, or 29 years minus 20 days). Their appearance and longitude are irregular due to a lack of synchronization with the anomalistic month (period of perigee). However, groupings of 3 inex cycles (≈ 87 years minus 2 months) comes close (≈ 1,151.02 anomalistic months), so eclipses are similar in these groupings.

Series members between 1801 and 2200
January 1, 1824 (Saros 119)	December 11, 1852 (Saros 120)	November 21, 1881 (Saros 121)
November 2, 1910 (Saros 122)	October 12, 1939 (Saros 123)	September 22, 1968 (Saros 124)
September 2, 1997 (Saros 125)	August 12, 2026 (Saros 126)	July 24, 2055 (Saros 127)
July 3, 2084 (Saros 128)	June 13, 2113 (Saros 129)	May 25, 2142 (Saros 130)
May 5, 2171 (Saros 131)	April 14, 2200 (Saros 132)	
