= Solar eclipse of October 23, 1957 =

Total eclipse

- Total eclipse
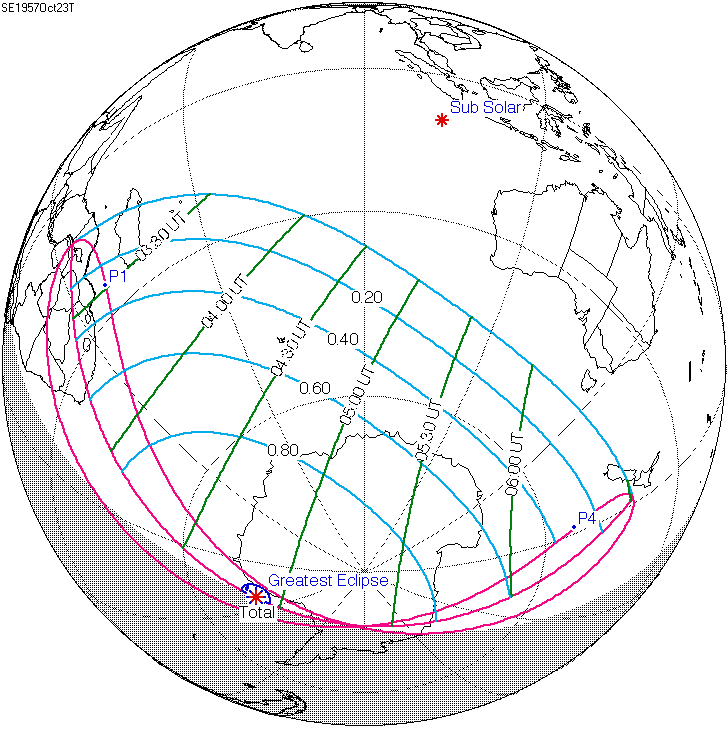
- Map
- Gamma: 1.0022
- Magnitude: 1.0013

Maximum eclipse
- Duration: -
- Coordinates: 71.2°S 23.1°W
- Max. width of band: km

Times (UTC)
- Greatest eclipse: 4:54:02

References
- Saros: 123 (50 of 70)
- Catalog # (SE5000): 9415

A total solar eclipse occurred at the Moon's ascending node of orbit on Wednesday, October 23, 1957, with a magnitude of 1.0013. A solar eclipse occurs when the Moon passes between Earth and the Sun, thereby totally or partly obscuring the image of the Sun for a viewer on Earth. A total solar eclipse occurs when the Moon's apparent diameter is larger than the Sun's, blocking all direct sunlight, turning day into darkness. Totality occurs in a narrow path across Earth's surface, with the partial solar eclipse visible over a surrounding region thousands of kilometres wide. Occurring about 1.4 days after perigee (on October 21, 1957, at 13:10 UTC), the Moon's apparent diameter was larger.

It was unusual that while it is a total solar eclipse, it is not a central one. A non-central eclipse is one where the center-line of totality does not intersect the surface of the Earth (when the gamma is between 0.9972 and 1.0260). Instead, the center line passes just above the Earth's surface. This rare type occurs when totality is only visible at sunset or sunrise in a polar region.

While totality was not visible for any land masses, a partial eclipse was visible for Southern Africa, Antarctica, and New Zealand. This was the last of 44 umbral solar eclipses in Solar Saros 123.

== Eclipse details ==
Shown below are two tables displaying details about this particular solar eclipse. The first table outlines times at which the Moon's penumbra or umbra attains the specific parameter, and the second table describes various other parameters pertaining to this eclipse.

October 23, 1957 Solar Eclipse Times
Event	Time (UTC)
First Penumbral External Contact	1957 October 23 at 02:51:30.3 UTC
Ecliptic Conjunction	1957 October 23 at 04:43:52.2 UTC
First Umbral External Contact	1957 October 23 at 04:49:55.5 UTC
Greatest Eclipse	1957 October 23 at 04:54:02.5 UTC
Last Umbral External Contact	1957 October 23 at 04:57:47.0 UTC
Equatorial Conjunction	1957 October 23 at 05:22:28.4 UTC
Last Penumbral External Contact	1957 October 23 at 06:56:24.8 UTC

October 23, 1957 Solar Eclipse Parameters
Parameter	Value
Eclipse Magnitude	1.00130
Eclipse Obscuration	-
Gamma	−1.00218
Sun Right Ascension	13h49m48.9s
Sun Declination	-11°18'19.3"
Sun Semi-Diameter	16'04.7"
Sun Equatorial Horizontal Parallax	08.8"
Moon Right Ascension	13h48m44.3s
Moon Declination	-12°16'32.6"
Moon Semi-Diameter	16'26.5"
Moon Equatorial Horizontal Parallax	1°00'20.5"
ΔT	32.1 s

== Eclipse season ==
This eclipse is part of an eclipse season, a period, roughly every six months, when eclipses occur. Only two (or occasionally three) eclipse seasons occur each year, and each season lasts about 35 days and repeats just short of six months (173 days) later; thus two full eclipse seasons always occur each year. Either two or three eclipses happen each eclipse season. In the sequence below, each eclipse is separated by a fortnight.

Eclipse season of October–November 1957
October 23 Ascending node (new moon)	November 7 Descending node (full moon)
Total solar eclipse Solar Saros 123	Total lunar eclipse Lunar Saros 135

== Related eclipses ==
=== Eclipses in 1957 ===
- A non-central annular solar eclipse on April 30.
- A total lunar eclipse on May 13.
- A non-central total solar eclipse on October 23.
- A total lunar eclipse on November 7.

=== Metonic ===
- Preceded by: Solar eclipse of January 5, 1954
- Followed by: Solar eclipse of August 11, 1961

=== Tzolkinex ===
- Preceded by: Solar eclipse of September 12, 1950
- Followed by: Solar eclipse of December 4, 1964

=== Half-Saros ===
- Preceded by: Lunar eclipse of October 18, 1948
- Followed by: Lunar eclipse of October 29, 1966

=== Tritos ===
- Preceded by: Solar eclipse of November 23, 1946
- Followed by: Solar eclipse of September 22, 1968

=== Solar Saros 123 ===
- Preceded by: Solar eclipse of October 12, 1939
- Followed by: Solar eclipse of November 3, 1975

=== Inex ===
- Preceded by: Solar eclipse of November 12, 1928
- Followed by: Solar eclipse of October 3, 1986

=== Triad ===
- Preceded by: Solar eclipse of December 22, 1870
- Followed by: Solar eclipse of August 23, 2044

=== Solar eclipses of 1957–1960 ===
This eclipse is a member of a semester series. An eclipse in a semester series of solar eclipses repeats approximately every 177 days and 4 hours (a semester) at alternating nodes of the Moon's orbit.

Solar eclipse series sets from 1957 to 1960
Descending node			Ascending node		
Saros	Map	Gamma	Saros	Map	Gamma
118	April 30, 1957 Annular (non-central)	0.9992	123	October 23, 1957 Total (non-central)	1.0022
128	April 19, 1958 Annular	0.275	133	October 12, 1958 Total	−0.2951
138	April 8, 1959 Annular	−0.4546	143	October 2, 1959 Total	0.4207
148	March 27, 1960 Partial	−1.1537	153	September 20, 1960 Partial	1.2057

=== Saros 123 ===
This eclipse is a part of Saros series 123, repeating every 18 years, 11 days, and containing 70 events. The series started with a partial solar eclipse on April 29, 1074. It contains annular eclipses from July 2, 1182 through April 19, 1651; hybrid eclipses from April 30, 1669 through May 22, 1705; and total eclipses from June 3, 1723 through October 23, 1957. The series ends at member 70 as a partial eclipse on May 31, 2318. Its eclipses are tabulated in three columns; every third eclipse in the same column is one exeligmos apart, so they all cast shadows over approximately the same parts of the Earth.

The longest duration of annularity was produced by member 19 at 8 minutes, 7 seconds on November 9, 1398, and the longest duration of totality was produced by member 42 at 3 minutes, 27 seconds on July 27, 1813. All eclipses in this series occur at the Moon’s ascending node of orbit.

Series members 42–63 occur between 1801 and 2200:
42	43	44
July 27, 1813	August 7, 1831	August 18, 1849
45	46	47
August 29, 1867	September 8, 1885	September 21, 1903
48	49	50
October 1, 1921	October 12, 1939	October 23, 1957
51	52	53
November 3, 1975	November 13, 1993	November 25, 2011
54	55	56
December 5, 2029	December 16, 2047	December 27, 2065
57	58	59
January 7, 2084	January 19, 2102	January 30, 2120
60	61	62
February 9, 2138	February 21, 2156	March 3, 2174
63
March 13, 2192

=== Metonic series ===
The metonic series repeats eclipses every 19 years (6939.69 days), lasting about 5 cycles. Eclipses occur in nearly the same calendar date. In addition, the octon subseries repeats 1/5 of that or every 3.8 years (1387.94 days). All eclipses in this table occur at the Moon's ascending node.

22 eclipse events between January 5, 1935 and August 11, 2018
January 4–5	October 23–24	August 10–12	May 30–31	March 18–19
111	113	115	117	119
January 5, 1935		August 12, 1942	May 30, 1946	March 18, 1950
121	123	125	127	129
January 5, 1954	October 23, 1957	August 11, 1961	May 30, 1965	March 18, 1969
131	133	135	137	139
January 4, 1973	October 23, 1976	August 10, 1980	May 30, 1984	March 18, 1988
141	143	145	147	149
January 4, 1992	October 24, 1995	August 11, 1999	May 31, 2003	March 19, 2007
151	153	155		
January 4, 2011	October 23, 2014	August 11, 2018		

=== Tritos series ===
This eclipse is a part of a tritos cycle, repeating at alternating nodes every 135 synodic months (≈ 3986.63 days, or 11 years minus 1 month). Their appearance and longitude are irregular due to a lack of synchronization with the anomalistic month (period of perigee), but groupings of 3 tritos cycles (≈ 33 years minus 3 months) come close (≈ 434.044 anomalistic months), so eclipses are similar in these groupings.

Series members between 1801 and 2200
January 1, 1805 (Saros 109)		October 31, 1826 (Saros 111)		August 28, 1848 (Saros 113)
July 29, 1859 (Saros 114)	June 28, 1870 (Saros 115)	May 27, 1881 (Saros 116)	April 26, 1892 (Saros 117)	March 29, 1903 (Saros 118)
February 25, 1914 (Saros 119)	January 24, 1925 (Saros 120)	December 25, 1935 (Saros 121)	November 23, 1946 (Saros 122)	October 23, 1957 (Saros 123)
September 22, 1968 (Saros 124)	August 22, 1979 (Saros 125)	July 22, 1990 (Saros 126)	June 21, 2001 (Saros 127)	May 20, 2012 (Saros 128)
April 20, 2023 (Saros 129)	March 20, 2034 (Saros 130)	February 16, 2045 (Saros 131)	January 16, 2056 (Saros 132)	December 17, 2066 (Saros 133)
November 15, 2077 (Saros 134)	October 14, 2088 (Saros 135)	September 14, 2099 (Saros 136)	August 15, 2110 (Saros 137)	July 14, 2121 (Saros 138)
June 13, 2132 (Saros 139)	May 14, 2143 (Saros 140)	April 12, 2154 (Saros 141)	March 12, 2165 (Saros 142)	February 10, 2176 (Saros 143)
January 9, 2187 (Saros 144)	December 9, 2197 (Saros 145)			

=== Inex series ===
This eclipse is a part of the long period inex cycle, repeating at alternating nodes, every 358 synodic months (≈ 10,571.95 days, or 29 years minus 20 days). Their appearance and longitude are irregular due to a lack of synchronization with the anomalistic month (period of perigee). However, groupings of 3 inex cycles (≈ 87 years minus 2 months) comes close (≈ 1,151.02 anomalistic months), so eclipses are similar in these groupings.

Series members between 1801 and 2200
February 1, 1813 (Saros 118)	January 11, 1842 (Saros 119)	December 22, 1870 (Saros 120)
December 3, 1899 (Saros 121)	November 12, 1928 (Saros 122)	October 23, 1957 (Saros 123)
October 3, 1986 (Saros 124)	September 13, 2015 (Saros 125)	August 23, 2044 (Saros 126)
August 3, 2073 (Saros 127)	July 15, 2102 (Saros 128)	June 25, 2131 (Saros 129)
June 4, 2160 (Saros 130)	May 15, 2189 (Saros 131)	
