= Solar eclipse of August 22, 1979 =

20th-century annular solar eclipse

- Annular eclipse
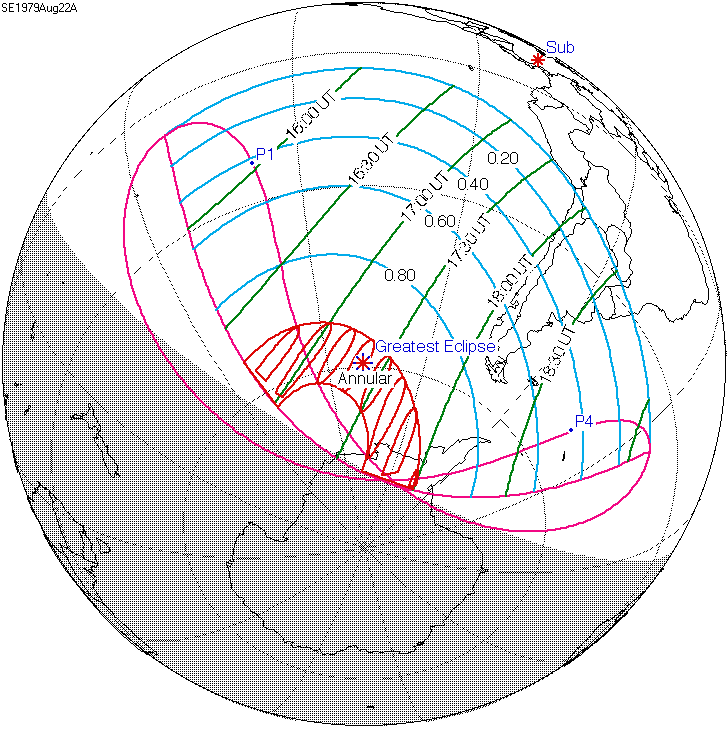
- Map
- Gamma: −0.9632
- Magnitude: 0.9329

Maximum eclipse
- Duration: 363 s (6 min 3 s)
- Coordinates: 59.6°S 108.5°W
- Max. width of band: 953 km (592 mi)

Times (UTC)
- Greatest eclipse: 17:22:38

References
- Saros: 125 (52 of 73)
- Catalog # (SE5000): 9463

An annular solar eclipse occurred at the Moon's ascending node of orbit on Wednesday, August 22, 1979, with a magnitude of 0.9329. A solar eclipse occurs when the Moon passes between Earth and the Sun, thereby totally or partly obscuring the image of the Sun for a viewer on Earth. An annular solar eclipse occurs when the Moon's apparent diameter is smaller than the Sun's, blocking most of the Sun's light and causing the Sun to look like an annulus (ring). An annular eclipse appears as a partial eclipse over a region of the Earth thousands of kilometres wide. Occurring about 15 hours before apogee (on August 23, 1979, at 8:10 UTC), the Moon's apparent diameter was smaller.

Annularity was visible for a part of Antarctica. A partial eclipse was visible for parts of southern South America and Antarctica. This was the last of 40 umbral eclipses in Solar Saros 125.

== Eclipse details ==
Shown below are two tables displaying details about this particular solar eclipse. The first table outlines times at which the Moon's penumbra or umbra attains the specific parameter, and the second table describes various other parameters pertaining to this eclipse.

August 22, 1979 Solar Eclipse Times
| Event | Time (UTC) |
|---|---|
| First Penumbral External Contact | 1979 August 22 at 14:55:55.6 UTC |
| First Umbral External Contact | 1979 August 22 at 16:43:17.2 UTC |
| First Central Line | 1979 August 22 at 16:51:47.8 UTC |
| First Umbral Internal Contact | 1979 August 22 at 17:03:32.7 UTC |
| Ecliptic Conjunction | 1979 August 22 at 17:11:15.7 UTC |
| Greatest Duration | 1979 August 22 at 17:22:05.7 UTC |
| Greatest Eclipse | 1979 August 22 at 17:22:38.0 UTC |
| Equatorial Conjunction | 1979 August 22 at 17:52:40.4 UTC |
| Last Umbral Internal Contact | 1979 August 22 at 17:41:20.6 UTC |
| Last Central Line | 1979 August 22 at 17:53:06.4 UTC |
| Last Umbral External Contact | 1979 August 22 at 18:01:37.8 UTC |
| Last Penumbral External Contact | 1979 August 22 at 19:49:07.3 UTC |

August 22, 1979 Solar Eclipse Parameters
| Parameter | Value |
|---|---|
| Eclipse Magnitude | 0.93295 |
| Eclipse Obscuration | 0.87039 |
| Gamma | −0.96319 |
| Sun Right Ascension | 10h04m36.4s |
| Sun Declination | +11°48'55.0" |
| Sun Semi-Diameter | 15'48.8" |
| Sun Equatorial Horizontal Parallax | 08.7" |
| Moon Right Ascension | 10h03m42.7s |
| Moon Declination | +10°58'46.8" |
| Moon Semi-Diameter | 14'42.1" |
| Moon Equatorial Horizontal Parallax | 0°53'57.5" |
| ΔT | 50.2 s |

== Eclipse season ==
This eclipse is part of an eclipse season, a period, roughly every six months, when eclipses occur. Only two (or occasionally three) eclipse seasons occur each year, and each season lasts about 35 days and repeats just short of six months (173 days) later; thus two full eclipse seasons always occur each year. Either two or three eclipses happen each eclipse season. In the sequence below, each eclipse is separated by a fortnight.

Eclipse season of August–September 1979
| August 22 Ascending node (new moon) | September 6 Descending node (full moon) |
|---|---|
| Annular solar eclipse Solar Saros 125 | Total lunar eclipse Lunar Saros 137 |

== Related eclipses ==
=== Eclipses in 1979 ===
- A total solar eclipse on February 26.
- A partial lunar eclipse on March 13.
- An annular solar eclipse on August 22.
- A total lunar eclipse on September 6.

=== Metonic ===
- Preceded by: Solar eclipse of November 3, 1975
- Followed by: Solar eclipse of June 11, 1983

=== Tzolkinex ===
- Preceded by: Solar eclipse of July 10, 1972
- Followed by: Solar eclipse of October 3, 1986

=== Half-Saros ===
- Preceded by: Lunar eclipse of August 17, 1970
- Followed by: Lunar eclipse of August 27, 1988

=== Tritos ===
- Preceded by: Solar eclipse of September 22, 1968
- Followed by: Solar eclipse of July 22, 1990

=== Solar Saros 125 ===
- Preceded by: Solar eclipse of August 11, 1961
- Followed by: Solar eclipse of September 2, 1997

=== Inex ===
- Preceded by: Solar eclipse of September 12, 1950
- Followed by: Solar eclipse of August 1, 2008

=== Triad ===
- Preceded by: Solar eclipse of October 20, 1892
- Followed by: Solar eclipse of June 22, 2066

=== Solar eclipses of 1979–1982 ===
This eclipse is a member of a semester series. An eclipse in a semester series of solar eclipses repeats approximately every 177 days and 4 hours (a semester) at alternating nodes of the Moon's orbit.

The partial solar eclipses on June 21, 1982 and December 15, 1982 occur in the next lunar year eclipse set.

Solar eclipse series sets from 1979 to 1982
| Descending node | | | Ascending node | | |
| Saros | Map | Gamma | Saros | Map | Gamma |
| 120 Totality in Brandon, MB, Canada | February 26, 1979 Total | 0.8981 | 125 | August 22, 1979 Annular | −0.9632 |
| 130 | February 16, 1980 Total | 0.2224 | 135 | August 10, 1980 Annular | −0.1915 |
| 140 | February 4, 1981 Annular | −0.4838 | 145 | July 31, 1981 Total | 0.5792 |
| 150 | January 25, 1982 Partial | −1.2311 | 155 | July 20, 1982 Partial | 1.2886 |

=== Saros 125 ===
This eclipse is a part of Saros series 125, repeating every 18 years, 11 days, and containing 73 events. The series started with a partial solar eclipse on February 4, 1060. It contains total eclipses from June 13, 1276 through July 16, 1330; hybrid eclipses on July 26, 1348 and August 7, 1366; and annular eclipses from August 17, 1384 through August 22, 1979. The series ends at member 73 as a partial eclipse on April 9, 2358. Its eclipses are tabulated in three columns; every third eclipse in the same column is one exeligmos apart, so they all cast shadows over approximately the same parts of the Earth.

The longest duration of totality was produced by member 14 at 1 minutes, 11 seconds on June 25, 1294, and the longest duration of annularity was produced by member 48 at 7 minutes, 23 seconds on July 10, 1907. All eclipses in this series occur at the Moon’s ascending node of orbit.

Series members 43–64 occur between 1801 and 2200:
| 43 | 44 | 45 |
|---|---|---|
| May 16, 1817 | May 27, 1835 | June 6, 1853 |
| 46 | 47 | 48 |
| June 18, 1871 | June 28, 1889 | July 10, 1907 |
| 49 | 50 | 51 |
| July 20, 1925 | August 1, 1943 | August 11, 1961 |
| 52 | 53 | 54 |
| August 22, 1979 | September 2, 1997 | September 13, 2015 |
| 55 | 56 | 57 |
| September 23, 2033 | October 4, 2051 | October 15, 2069 |
| 58 | 59 | 60 |
| October 26, 2087 | November 6, 2105 | November 18, 2123 |
| 61 | 62 | 63 |
| November 28, 2141 | December 9, 2159 | December 20, 2177 |
64
December 31, 2195

=== Metonic series ===
The metonic series repeats eclipses every 19 years (6939.69 days), lasting about 5 cycles. Eclipses occur in nearly the same calendar date. In addition, the octon subseries repeats 1/5 of that or every 3.8 years (1387.94 days). All eclipses in this table occur at the Moon's ascending node.

20 eclipse events between June 10, 1964 and August 21, 2036
| June 10–11 | March 28–29 | January 14–16 | November 3 | August 21–22 |
| 117 | 119 | 121 | 123 | 125 |
|---|---|---|---|---|
| June 10, 1964 | March 28, 1968 | January 16, 1972 | November 3, 1975 | August 22, 1979 |
| 127 | 129 | 131 | 133 | 135 |
| June 11, 1983 | March 29, 1987 | January 15, 1991 | November 3, 1994 | August 22, 1998 |
| 137 | 139 | 141 | 143 | 145 |
| June 10, 2002 | March 29, 2006 | January 15, 2010 | November 3, 2013 | August 21, 2017 |
| 147 | 149 | 151 | 153 | 155 |
| June 10, 2021 | March 29, 2025 | January 14, 2029 | November 3, 2032 | August 21, 2036 |

=== Tritos series ===
This eclipse is a part of a tritos cycle, repeating at alternating nodes every 135 synodic months (≈ 3986.63 days, or 11 years minus 1 month). Their appearance and longitude are irregular due to a lack of synchronization with the anomalistic month (period of perigee), but groupings of 3 tritos cycles (≈ 33 years minus 3 months) come close (≈ 434.044 anomalistic months), so eclipses are similar in these groupings.

Series members between 1801 and 2200
| January 1, 1805 (Saros 109) | | October 31, 1826 (Saros 111) | | August 28, 1848 (Saros 113) |
| July 29, 1859 (Saros 114) | June 28, 1870 (Saros 115) | May 27, 1881 (Saros 116) | April 26, 1892 (Saros 117) | March 29, 1903 (Saros 118) |
| February 25, 1914 (Saros 119) | January 24, 1925 (Saros 120) | December 25, 1935 (Saros 121) | November 23, 1946 (Saros 122) | October 23, 1957 (Saros 123) |
| September 22, 1968 (Saros 124) | August 22, 1979 (Saros 125) | July 22, 1990 (Saros 126) | June 21, 2001 (Saros 127) | May 20, 2012 (Saros 128) |
| April 20, 2023 (Saros 129) | March 20, 2034 (Saros 130) | February 16, 2045 (Saros 131) | January 16, 2056 (Saros 132) | December 17, 2066 (Saros 133) |
| November 15, 2077 (Saros 134) | October 14, 2088 (Saros 135) | September 14, 2099 (Saros 136) | August 15, 2110 (Saros 137) | July 14, 2121 (Saros 138) |
| June 13, 2132 (Saros 139) | May 14, 2143 (Saros 140) | April 12, 2154 (Saros 141) | March 12, 2165 (Saros 142) | February 10, 2176 (Saros 143) |
| January 9, 2187 (Saros 144) | December 9, 2197 (Saros 145) | | | |

=== Inex series ===
This eclipse is a part of the long period inex cycle, repeating at alternating nodes, every 358 synodic months (≈ 10,571.95 days, or 29 years minus 20 days). Their appearance and longitude are irregular due to a lack of synchronization with the anomalistic month (period of perigee). However, groupings of 3 inex cycles (≈ 87 years minus 2 months) comes close (≈ 1,151.02 anomalistic months), so eclipses are similar in these groupings.

Series members between 1801 and 2200
| December 21, 1805 (Saros 119) | November 30, 1834 (Saros 120) | November 11, 1863 (Saros 121) |
| October 20, 1892 (Saros 122) | October 1, 1921 (Saros 123) | September 12, 1950 (Saros 124) |
| August 22, 1979 (Saros 125) | August 1, 2008 (Saros 126) | July 13, 2037 (Saros 127) |
| June 22, 2066 (Saros 128) | June 2, 2095 (Saros 129) | May 14, 2124 (Saros 130) |
| April 23, 2153 (Saros 131) | April 3, 2182 (Saros 132) | |
