= Solar eclipse of October 1, 1921 =

Total eclipse

- Total eclipse
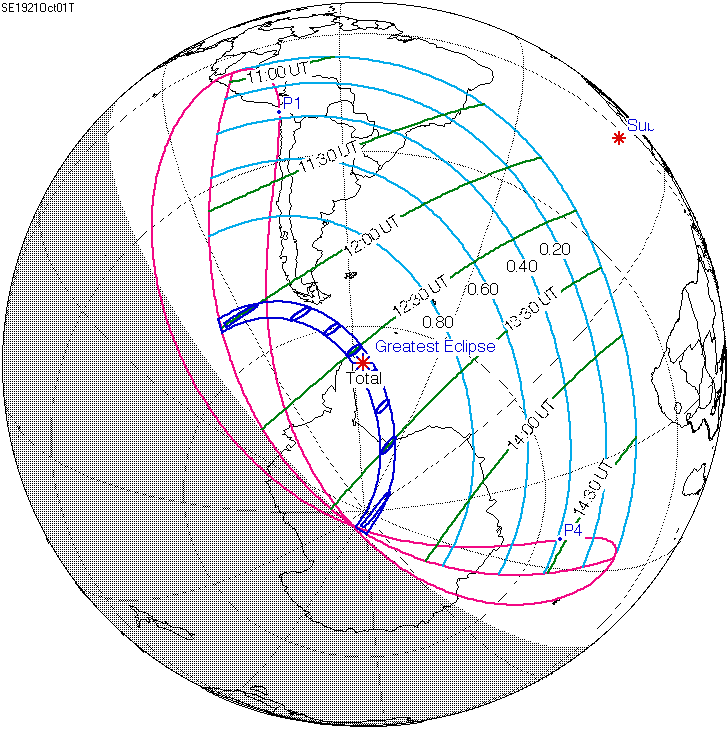
- Map
- Gamma: −0.9383
- Magnitude: 1.0293

Maximum eclipse
- Duration: 112 s (1 min 52 s)
- Coordinates: 66.1°S 56.1°W
- Max. width of band: 291 km (181 mi)

Times (UTC)
- Greatest eclipse: 12:35:58

References
- Saros: 123 (48 of 70)
- Catalog # (SE5000): 9331

A total solar eclipse occurred at the Moon's ascending node of orbit on Saturday, October 1, 1921, with a magnitude of 1.0293. A solar eclipse occurs when the Moon passes between Earth and the Sun, thereby totally or partly obscuring the image of the Sun for a viewer on Earth. A total solar eclipse occurs when the Moon's apparent diameter is larger than the Sun's, blocking all direct sunlight, turning day into darkness. Totality occurs in a narrow path across Earth's surface, with the partial solar eclipse visible over a surrounding region thousands of kilometres wide. Occurring about 1.9 days after perigee (on September 29, 1921, at 14:50 UTC), the Moon's apparent diameter was larger.

Totality was visible from parts of Antarctica. A partial eclipse was visible for parts of South America and Antarctica.

== Eclipse details ==
Shown below are two tables displaying details about this particular solar eclipse. The first table outlines times at which the Moon's penumbra or umbra attains the specific parameter, and the second table describes various other parameters pertaining to this eclipse.

October 1, 1921 Solar Eclipse Times
Event	Time (UTC)
First Penumbral External Contact	1921 October 1 at 10:27:26.7 UTC
First Umbral External Contact	1921 October 1 at 11:58:17.2 UTC
First Central Line	1921 October 1 at 12:00:11.9 UTC
First Umbral Internal Contact	1921 October 1 at 12:02:12.3 UTC
Ecliptic Conjunction	1921 October 1 at 12:26:22.9 UTC
Greatest Duration	1921 October 1 at 12:35:07.2 UTC
Greatest Eclipse	1921 October 1 at 12:35:58.1 UTC
Equatorial Conjunction	1921 October 1 at 13:07:31.9 UTC
Last Umbral Internal Contact	1921 October 1 at 13:09:22.8 UTC
Last Central Line	1921 October 1 at 13:11:21.2 UTC
Last Umbral External Contact	1921 October 1 at 13:13:14.0 UTC
Last Penumbral External Contact	1921 October 1 at 14:44:18.5 UTC

October 1, 1921 Solar Eclipse Parameters
Parameter	Value
Eclipse Magnitude	1.02931
Eclipse Obscuration	1.05948
Gamma	−0.93833
Sun Right Ascension	12h28m35.7s
Sun Declination	-03°05'21.9"
Sun Semi-Diameter	15'58.8"
Sun Equatorial Horizontal Parallax	08.8"
Moon Right Ascension	12h27m27.1s
Moon Declination	-03°58'54.5"
Moon Semi-Diameter	16'21.8"
Moon Equatorial Horizontal Parallax	1°00'03.1"
ΔT	22.4 s

== Eclipse season ==
This eclipse is part of an eclipse season, a period, roughly every six months, when eclipses occur. Only two (or occasionally three) eclipse seasons occur each year, and each season lasts about 35 days and repeats just short of six months (173 days) later; thus two full eclipse seasons always occur each year. Either two or three eclipses happen each eclipse season. In the sequence below, each eclipse is separated by a fortnight.

Eclipse season of October 1921
October 1 Ascending node (new moon)	October 16 Descending node (full moon)
Total solar eclipse Solar Saros 123	Partial lunar eclipse Lunar Saros 135

== Related eclipses ==
=== Eclipses in 1921 ===
- An annular solar eclipse on April 8.
- A total lunar eclipse on April 22.
- A total solar eclipse on October 1.
- A partial lunar eclipse on October 16.

=== Metonic ===
- Preceded by: Solar eclipse of December 14, 1917
- Followed by: Solar eclipse of July 20, 1925

=== Tzolkinex ===
- Preceded by: Solar eclipse of August 21, 1914
- Followed by: Solar eclipse of November 12, 1928

=== Half-Saros ===
- Preceded by: Lunar eclipse of September 26, 1912
- Followed by: Lunar eclipse of October 7, 1930

=== Tritos ===
- Preceded by: Solar eclipse of November 2, 1910
- Followed by: Solar eclipse of August 31, 1932

=== Solar Saros 123 ===
- Preceded by: Solar eclipse of September 21, 1903
- Followed by: Solar eclipse of October 12, 1939

=== Inex ===
- Preceded by: Solar eclipse of October 20, 1892
- Followed by: Solar eclipse of September 12, 1950

=== Triad ===
- Preceded by: Solar eclipse of November 30, 1834
- Followed by: Solar eclipse of August 1, 2008

=== Solar eclipses of 1921–1924 ===
This eclipse is a member of a semester series. An eclipse in a semester series of solar eclipses repeats approximately every 177 days and 4 hours (a semester) at alternating nodes of the Moon's orbit.

The partial solar eclipse on July 31, 1924 occurs in the next lunar year eclipse set.

Solar eclipse series sets from 1921 to 1924
Descending node			Ascending node		
Saros	Map	Gamma	Saros	Map	Gamma
118	April 8, 1921 Annular	0.8869	123	October 1, 1921 Total	−0.9383
128	March 28, 1922 Annular	0.1711	133	September 21, 1922 Total	−0.213
138	March 17, 1923 Annular	−0.5438	143	September 10, 1923 Total	0.5149
148	March 5, 1924 Partial	−1.2232	153	August 30, 1924 Partial	1.3123

=== Saros 123 ===
This eclipse is a part of Saros series 123, repeating every 18 years, 11 days, and containing 70 events. The series started with a partial solar eclipse on April 29, 1074. It contains annular eclipses from July 2, 1182 through April 19, 1651; hybrid eclipses from April 30, 1669 through May 22, 1705; and total eclipses from June 3, 1723 through October 23, 1957. The series ends at member 70 as a partial eclipse on May 31, 2318. Its eclipses are tabulated in three columns; every third eclipse in the same column is one exeligmos apart, so they all cast shadows over approximately the same parts of the Earth.

The longest duration of annularity was produced by member 19 at 8 minutes, 7 seconds on November 9, 1398, and the longest duration of totality was produced by member 42 at 3 minutes, 27 seconds on July 27, 1813. All eclipses in this series occur at the Moon’s ascending node of orbit.

Series members 42–63 occur between 1801 and 2200:
42	43	44
July 27, 1813	August 7, 1831	August 18, 1849
45	46	47
August 29, 1867	September 8, 1885	September 21, 1903
48	49	50
October 1, 1921	October 12, 1939	October 23, 1957
51	52	53
November 3, 1975	November 13, 1993	November 25, 2011
54	55	56
December 5, 2029	December 16, 2047	December 27, 2065
57	58	59
January 7, 2084	January 19, 2102	January 30, 2120
60	61	62
February 9, 2138	February 21, 2156	March 3, 2174
63
March 13, 2192

=== Metonic series ===
The metonic series repeats eclipses every 19 years (6939.69 days), lasting about 5 cycles. Eclipses occur in nearly the same calendar date. In addition, the octon subseries repeats 1/5 of that or every 3.8 years (1387.94 days). All eclipses in this table occur at the Moon's ascending node.

22 eclipse events between December 13, 1898 and July 20, 1982
December 13–14	October 1–2	July 20–21	May 9	February 24–25
111	113	115	117	119
December 13, 1898		July 21, 1906	May 9, 1910	February 25, 1914
121	123	125	127	129
December 14, 1917	October 1, 1921	July 20, 1925	May 9, 1929	February 24, 1933
131	133	135	137	139
December 13, 1936	October 1, 1940	July 20, 1944	May 9, 1948	February 25, 1952
141	143	145	147	149
December 14, 1955	October 2, 1959	July 20, 1963	May 9, 1967	February 25, 1971
151	153	155		
December 13, 1974	October 2, 1978	July 20, 1982		

=== Tritos series ===
This eclipse is a part of a tritos cycle, repeating at alternating nodes every 135 synodic months (≈ 3986.63 days, or 11 years minus 1 month). Their appearance and longitude are irregular due to a lack of synchronization with the anomalistic month (period of perigee), but groupings of 3 tritos cycles (≈ 33 years minus 3 months) come close (≈ 434.044 anomalistic months), so eclipses are similar in these groupings.

Series members between 1801 and 2200
September 8, 1801 (Saros 112)	August 7, 1812 (Saros 113)	July 8, 1823 (Saros 114)	June 7, 1834 (Saros 115)	May 6, 1845 (Saros 116)
April 5, 1856 (Saros 117)	March 6, 1867 (Saros 118)	February 2, 1878 (Saros 119)	January 1, 1889 (Saros 120)	December 3, 1899 (Saros 121)
November 2, 1910 (Saros 122)	October 1, 1921 (Saros 123)	August 31, 1932 (Saros 124)	August 1, 1943 (Saros 125)	June 30, 1954 (Saros 126)
May 30, 1965 (Saros 127)	April 29, 1976 (Saros 128)	March 29, 1987 (Saros 129)	February 26, 1998 (Saros 130)	January 26, 2009 (Saros 131)
December 26, 2019 (Saros 132)	November 25, 2030 (Saros 133)	October 25, 2041 (Saros 134)	September 22, 2052 (Saros 135)	August 24, 2063 (Saros 136)
July 24, 2074 (Saros 137)	June 22, 2085 (Saros 138)	May 22, 2096 (Saros 139)	April 23, 2107 (Saros 140)	March 22, 2118 (Saros 141)
February 18, 2129 (Saros 142)	January 20, 2140 (Saros 143)	December 19, 2150 (Saros 144)	November 17, 2161 (Saros 145)	October 17, 2172 (Saros 146)
September 16, 2183 (Saros 147)	August 16, 2194 (Saros 148)			

=== Inex series ===
This eclipse is a part of the long period inex cycle, repeating at alternating nodes, every 358 synodic months (≈ 10,571.95 days, or 29 years minus 20 days). Their appearance and longitude are irregular due to a lack of synchronization with the anomalistic month (period of perigee). However, groupings of 3 inex cycles (≈ 87 years minus 2 months) comes close (≈ 1,151.02 anomalistic months), so eclipses are similar in these groupings.

Series members between 1801 and 2200
December 21, 1805 (Saros 119)	November 30, 1834 (Saros 120)	November 11, 1863 (Saros 121)
October 20, 1892 (Saros 122)	October 1, 1921 (Saros 123)	September 12, 1950 (Saros 124)
August 22, 1979 (Saros 125)	August 1, 2008 (Saros 126)	July 13, 2037 (Saros 127)
June 22, 2066 (Saros 128)	June 2, 2095 (Saros 129)	May 14, 2124 (Saros 130)
April 23, 2153 (Saros 131)	April 3, 2182 (Saros 132)	
