= Solar eclipse of February 14, 1934 =

Total eclipse

- Total eclipse
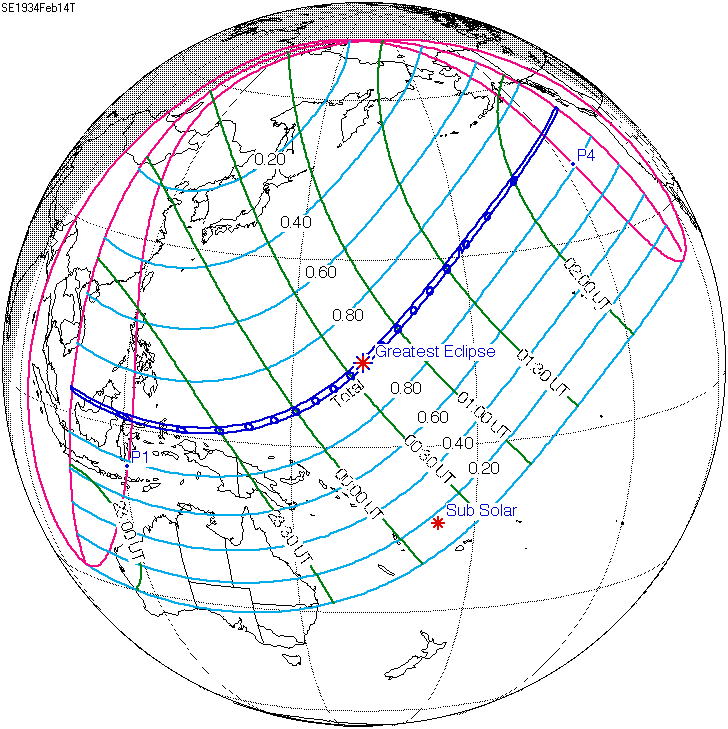
- Map
- Gamma: 0.4868
- Magnitude: 1.0321

Maximum eclipse
- Duration: 173 s (2 min 53 s)
- Coordinates: 13.2°N 161.7°E
- Max. width of band: 123 km (76 mi)

Times (UTC)
- Greatest eclipse: 0:38:41

References
- Saros: 139 (25 of 71)
- Catalog # (SE5000): 9360

A total solar eclipse occurred at the Moon's ascending node of orbit between Tuesday, February 13 and Wednesday, February 14, 1934, with a magnitude of 1.0321. A solar eclipse occurs when the Moon passes between Earth and the Sun, thereby totally or partly obscuring the image of the Sun for a viewer on Earth. A total solar eclipse occurs when the Moon's apparent diameter is larger than the Sun's, blocking all direct sunlight, turning day into darkness. Totality occurs in a narrow path across Earth's surface, with the partial solar eclipse visible over a surrounding region thousands of kilometres wide. Occurring only 1.6 days after perigee (on February 12, 1934, at 11:20 UTC), the Moon's apparent diameter was smaller.

Totality was visible from the Dutch East Indies (today's Indonesia), Raj of Sarawak (now belonging to Malaysia), and the South Seas Mandate of Japan (the part now belonging to FS Micronesia). A partial eclipse was visible for parts of East Asia, Southeast Asia, Australia, northern Oceania, Hawaii, and western North America.

The date of this eclipse visible from Asia, February 14, was also Lunar New Year celebrated in multiple countries.

== Eclipse details ==
Shown below are two tables displaying details about this particular solar eclipse. The first table outlines times at which the Moon's penumbra or umbra attains the specific parameter, and the second table describes various other parameters pertaining to this eclipse.

February 14, 1934 Solar Eclipse Times
Event	Time (UTC)
First Penumbral External Contact	1934 February 13 at 22:05:29.4 UTC
First Umbral External Contact	1934 February 13 at 23:06:39.1 UTC
First Central Line	1934 February 13 at 23:07:11.7 UTC
First Umbral Internal Contact	1934 February 13 at 23:07:44.4 UTC
Greatest Duration	1934 February 14 at 00:33:36.8 UTC
Greatest Eclipse	1934 February 14 at 00:38:41.4 UTC
Ecliptic Conjunction	1934 February 14 at 00:43:45.3 UTC
Equatorial Conjunction	1934 February 14 at 01:02:37.9 UTC
Last Umbral Internal Contact	1934 February 14 at 02:09:25.3 UTC
Last Central Line	1934 February 14 at 02:09:56.3 UTC
Last Umbral External Contact	1934 February 14 at 02:10:27.3 UTC
Last Penumbral External Contact	1934 February 14 at 03:11:47.3 UTC

February 14, 1934 Solar Eclipse Parameters
Parameter	Value
Eclipse Magnitude	1.03214
Eclipse Obscuration	1.06531
Gamma	0.48681
Sun Right Ascension	21h47m44.9s
Sun Declination	-13°18'50.8"
Sun Semi-Diameter	16'11.6"
Sun Equatorial Horizontal Parallax	08.9"
Moon Right Ascension	21h46m53.7s
Moon Declination	-12°52'16.3"
Moon Semi-Diameter	16'28.2"
Moon Equatorial Horizontal Parallax	1°00'26.8"
ΔT	23.9 s

== Eclipse season ==
This eclipse is part of an eclipse season, a period, roughly every six months, when eclipses occur. Only two (or occasionally three) eclipse seasons occur each year, and each season lasts about 35 days and repeats just short of six months (173 days) later; thus two full eclipse seasons always occur each year. Either two or three eclipses happen each eclipse season. In the sequence below, each eclipse is separated by a fortnight.

Eclipse season of January–February 1934
January 30 Descending node (full moon)	February 14 Ascending node (new moon)
Partial lunar eclipse Lunar Saros 113	Total solar eclipse Solar Saros 139

== Related eclipses ==
=== Eclipses in 1934 ===
- A partial lunar eclipse on January 30.
- A total solar eclipse on February 14.
- A partial lunar eclipse on July 26.
- An annular solar eclipse on August 10.

=== Metonic ===
- Preceded by: Solar eclipse of April 28, 1930
- Followed by: Solar eclipse of December 2, 1937

=== Tzolkinex ===
- Preceded by: Solar eclipse of January 3, 1927
- Followed by: Solar eclipse of March 27, 1941

=== Half-Saros ===
- Preceded by: Lunar eclipse of February 8, 1925
- Followed by: Lunar eclipse of February 20, 1943

=== Tritos ===
- Preceded by: Solar eclipse of March 17, 1923
- Followed by: Solar eclipse of January 14, 1945

=== Solar Saros 139 ===
- Preceded by: Solar eclipse of February 3, 1916
- Followed by: Solar eclipse of February 25, 1952

=== Inex ===
- Preceded by: Solar eclipse of March 6, 1905
- Followed by: Solar eclipse of January 25, 1963

=== Triad ===
- Preceded by: Solar eclipse of April 15, 1847
- Followed by: Solar eclipse of December 14, 2020

=== Solar eclipses of 1931–1935 ===
This eclipse is a member of a semester series. An eclipse in a semester series of solar eclipses repeats approximately every 177 days and 4 hours (a semester) at alternating nodes of the Moon's orbit.

The partial solar eclipses on April 18, 1931 and October 11, 1931 occur in the previous lunar year eclipse set, and the solar eclipses on January 5, 1935 (partial), June 30, 1935 (partial), and December 25, 1935 (annular) occur in the next lunar year eclipse set.

Solar eclipse series sets from 1931 to 1935
Descending node			Ascending node		
Saros	Map	Gamma	Saros	Map	Gamma
114	September 12, 1931 Partial	1.506	119	March 7, 1932 Annular	−0.9673
124	August 31, 1932 Total	0.8307	129	February 24, 1933 Annular	−0.2191
134	August 21, 1933 Annular	0.0869	139	February 14, 1934 Total	0.4868
144	August 10, 1934 Annular	−0.689	149	February 3, 1935 Partial	1.1438
154	July 30, 1935 Partial	−1.4259			

=== Saros 139 ===
This eclipse is a part of Saros series 139, repeating every 18 years, 11 days, and containing 71 events. The series started with a partial solar eclipse on May 17, 1501. It contains hybrid eclipses from August 11, 1627 through December 9, 1825 and total eclipses from December 21, 1843 through March 26, 2601. There are no annular eclipses in this set. The series ends at member 71 as a partial eclipse on July 3, 2763. Its eclipses are tabulated in three columns; every third eclipse in the same column is one exeligmos apart, so they all cast shadows over approximately the same parts of the Earth.

The longest duration of totality will be produced by member 61 at 7 minutes, 29.22 seconds on July 16, 2186. This date is the longest solar eclipse computed between 4000 BC and AD 6000. All eclipses in this series occur at the Moon’s ascending node of orbit.

Series members 18–39 occur between 1801 and 2200:
18	19	20
November 29, 1807	December 9, 1825	December 21, 1843
21	22	23
December 31, 1861	January 11, 1880	January 22, 1898
24	25	26
February 3, 1916	February 14, 1934	February 25, 1952
27	28	29
March 7, 1970	March 18, 1988	March 29, 2006
30	31	32
April 8, 2024	April 20, 2042	April 30, 2060
33	34	35
May 11, 2078	May 22, 2096	June 3, 2114
36	37	38
June 13, 2132	June 25, 2150	July 5, 2168
39
July 16, 2186

=== Metonic series ===
The metonic series repeats eclipses every 19 years (6939.69 days), lasting about 5 cycles. Eclipses occur in nearly the same calendar date. In addition, the octon subseries repeats 1/5 of that or every 3.8 years (1387.94 days). All eclipses in this table occur at the Moon's ascending node.

22 eclipse events between December 2, 1880 and July 9, 1964
December 2–3	September 20–21	July 9–10	April 26–28	February 13–14
111	113	115	117	119
December 2, 1880		July 9, 1888	April 26, 1892	February 13, 1896
121	123	125	127	129
December 3, 1899	September 21, 1903	July 10, 1907	April 28, 1911	February 14, 1915
131	133	135	137	139
December 3, 1918	September 21, 1922	July 9, 1926	April 28, 1930	February 14, 1934
141	143	145	147	149
December 2, 1937	September 21, 1941	July 9, 1945	April 28, 1949	February 14, 1953
151	153	155		
December 2, 1956	September 20, 1960	July 9, 1964		

=== Tritos series ===
This eclipse is a part of a tritos cycle, repeating at alternating nodes every 135 synodic months (≈ 3986.63 days, or 11 years minus 1 month). Their appearance and longitude are irregular due to a lack of synchronization with the anomalistic month (period of perigee), but groupings of 3 tritos cycles (≈ 33 years minus 3 months) come close (≈ 434.044 anomalistic months), so eclipses are similar in these groupings.

Series members between 1801 and 2200
February 21, 1803 (Saros 127)	January 21, 1814 (Saros 128)	December 20, 1824 (Saros 129)	November 20, 1835 (Saros 130)	October 20, 1846 (Saros 131)
September 18, 1857 (Saros 132)	August 18, 1868 (Saros 133)	July 19, 1879 (Saros 134)	June 17, 1890 (Saros 135)	May 18, 1901 (Saros 136)
April 17, 1912 (Saros 137)	March 17, 1923 (Saros 138)	February 14, 1934 (Saros 139)	January 14, 1945 (Saros 140)	December 14, 1955 (Saros 141)
November 12, 1966 (Saros 142)	October 12, 1977 (Saros 143)	September 11, 1988 (Saros 144)	August 11, 1999 (Saros 145)	July 11, 2010 (Saros 146)
June 10, 2021 (Saros 147)	May 9, 2032 (Saros 148)	April 9, 2043 (Saros 149)	March 9, 2054 (Saros 150)	February 5, 2065 (Saros 151)
January 6, 2076 (Saros 152)	December 6, 2086 (Saros 153)	November 4, 2097 (Saros 154)	October 5, 2108 (Saros 155)	September 5, 2119 (Saros 156)
August 4, 2130 (Saros 157)	July 3, 2141 (Saros 158)	June 3, 2152 (Saros 159)		April 1, 2174 (Saros 161)

=== Inex series ===
This eclipse is a part of the long period inex cycle, repeating at alternating nodes, every 358 synodic months (≈ 10,571.95 days, or 29 years minus 20 days). Their appearance and longitude are irregular due to a lack of synchronization with the anomalistic month (period of perigee). However, groupings of 3 inex cycles (≈ 87 years minus 2 months) comes close (≈ 1,151.02 anomalistic months), so eclipses are similar in these groupings.

Series members between 1801 and 2200
May 5, 1818 (Saros 135)	April 15, 1847 (Saros 136)	March 25, 1876 (Saros 137)
March 6, 1905 (Saros 138)	February 14, 1934 (Saros 139)	January 25, 1963 (Saros 140)
January 4, 1992 (Saros 141)	December 14, 2020 (Saros 142)	November 25, 2049 (Saros 143)
November 4, 2078 (Saros 144)	October 16, 2107 (Saros 145)	September 26, 2136 (Saros 146)
September 5, 2165 (Saros 147)	August 16, 2194 (Saros 148)	
