= Solar eclipse of February 3, 1916 =

Total eclipse

- Total eclipse
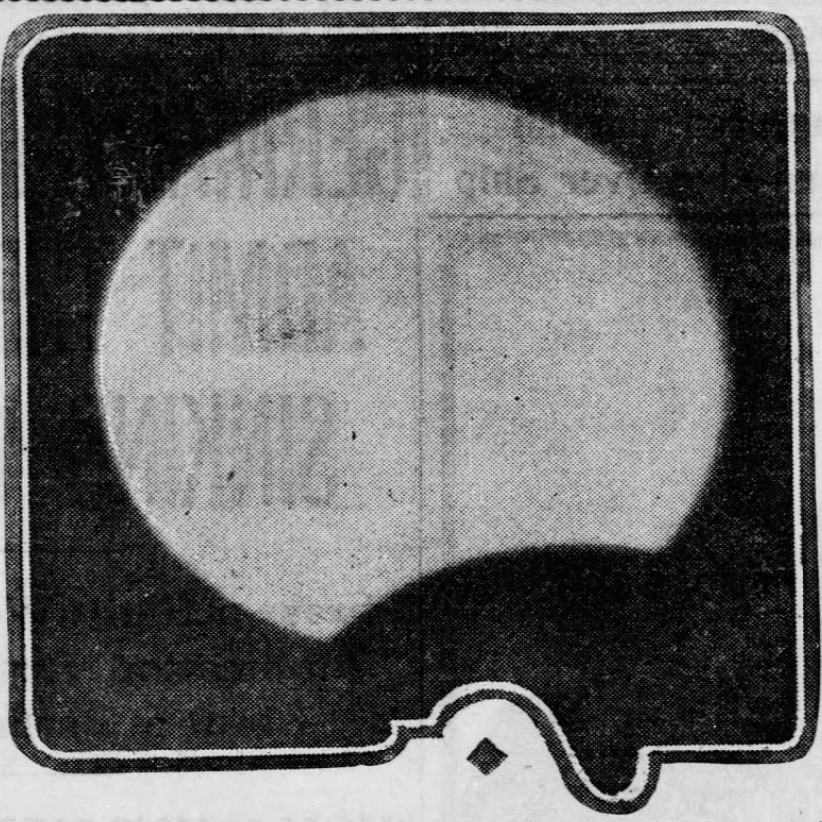

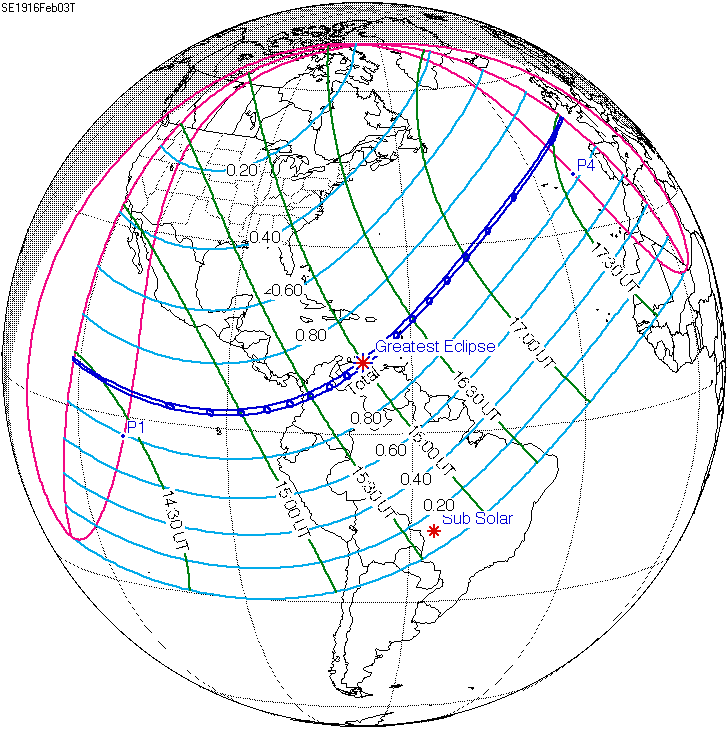
- Map
- Gamma: 0.4987
- Magnitude: 1.028

Maximum eclipse
- Duration: 156 s (2 min 36 s)
- Coordinates: 11.1°N 67.7°W
- Max. width of band: 108 km (67 mi)

Times (UTC)
- Greatest eclipse: 16:00:21

References
- Saros: 139 (24 of 71)
- Catalog # (SE5000): 9317

A total solar eclipse occurred at the Moon's ascending node of orbit on Thursday, February 3, 1916, with a magnitude of 1.028. A solar eclipse occurs when the Moon passes between Earth and the Sun, thereby totally or partly obscuring the image of the Sun for a viewer on Earth. A total solar eclipse occurs when the Moon's apparent diameter is larger than the Sun's, blocking all direct sunlight, turning day into darkness. Totality occurs in a narrow path across Earth's surface, with the partial solar eclipse visible over a surrounding region thousands of kilometres wide. Occurring 1.7 days after perigee (on February 2, 1916, at 0:00 UTC), the Moon's apparent diameter was larger.

Totality was visible in Colombia, Venezuela, and the whole Guadeloupe except Marie-Galante, Saint Martin and Saint Barthélemy. A partial eclipse was visible for parts of North America, Central America, northern South America, Northwest Africa, and Western Europe.

== Observations ==
The Argentine National Observatory sent a team to Tucacas, Falcón, Venezuela. Due to the economic depression caused by World War I, the best equipment could not be transported to the observation site. The team left Córdoba Province, Argentina on December 2, 1915, and arrived in Tucacas on January 14, 1916. It rained heavily within the first week after their arrival. There was still heavy rain on the early morning of February 3. The weather got better after that. By the time of totality, there was only a layer of mist, which slightly affected the observation. The team successfully took images of the corona and made spectral observations. The results were also compared with a later total solar eclipse of February 26, 1998 which was also visible in Falcón, Venezuela.

== Eclipse details ==
Shown below are two tables displaying details about this particular solar eclipse. The first table outlines times at which the Moon's penumbra or umbra attains the specific parameter, and the second table describes various other parameters pertaining to this eclipse.

February 3, 1916 Solar Eclipse Times
Event	Time (UTC)
First Penumbral External Contact	1916 February 3 at 13:27:05.9 UTC
First Umbral External Contact	1916 February 3 at 14:28:56.2 UTC
First Central Line	1916 February 3 at 14:29:21.6 UTC
First Umbral Internal Contact	1916 February 3 at 14:29:47.1 UTC
Greatest Duration	1916 February 3 at 15:55:04.9 UTC
Greatest Eclipse	1916 February 3 at 16:00:21.4 UTC
Ecliptic Conjunction	1916 February 3 at 16:05:33.2 UTC
Equatorial Conjunction	1916 February 3 at 16:21:50.2 UTC
Last Umbral Internal Contact	1916 February 3 at 17:30:44.2 UTC
Last Central Line	1916 February 3 at 17:31:07.9 UTC
Last Umbral External Contact	1916 February 3 at 17:31:31.6 UTC
Last Penumbral External Contact	1916 February 3 at 18:33:31.9 UTC

February 3, 1916 Solar Eclipse Parameters
Parameter	Value
Eclipse Magnitude	1.02800
Eclipse Obscuration	1.05678
Gamma	0.49875
Sun Right Ascension	21h03m55.2s
Sun Declination	-16°46'33.6"
Sun Semi-Diameter	16'13.5"
Sun Equatorial Horizontal Parallax	08.9"
Moon Right Ascension	21h03m07.7s
Moon Declination	-16°18'47.0"
Moon Semi-Diameter	16'26.3"
Moon Equatorial Horizontal Parallax	1°00'19.8"
ΔT	18.3 s

== Eclipse season ==
This eclipse is part of an eclipse season, a period, roughly every six months, when eclipses occur. Only two (or occasionally three) eclipse seasons occur each year, and each season lasts about 35 days and repeats just short of six months (173 days) later; thus two full eclipse seasons always occur each year. Either two or three eclipses happen each eclipse season. In the sequence below, each eclipse is separated by a fortnight.

Eclipse season of January–February 1916
January 20 Descending node (full moon)	February 3 Ascending node (new moon)
Partial lunar eclipse Lunar Saros 113	Total solar eclipse Solar Saros 139

== Related eclipses ==
=== Eclipses in 1916 ===
- A partial lunar eclipse on January 20.
- A total solar eclipse on February 3.
- A partial lunar eclipse on July 15.
- An annular solar eclipse on July 30.
- A partial solar eclipse on December 24.

=== Metonic ===
- Preceded by: Solar eclipse of April 17, 1912
- Followed by: Solar eclipse of November 22, 1919

=== Tzolkinex ===
- Preceded by: Solar eclipse of December 23, 1908
- Followed by: Solar eclipse of March 17, 1923

=== Half-Saros ===
- Preceded by: Lunar eclipse of January 29, 1907
- Followed by: Lunar eclipse of February 8, 1925

=== Tritos ===
- Preceded by: Solar eclipse of March 6, 1905
- Followed by: Solar eclipse of January 3, 1927

=== Solar Saros 139 ===
- Preceded by: Solar eclipse of January 22, 1898
- Followed by: Solar eclipse of February 14, 1934

=== Inex ===
- Preceded by: Solar eclipse of February 22, 1887
- Followed by: Solar eclipse of January 14, 1945

=== Triad ===
- Preceded by: Solar eclipse of April 3, 1829
- Followed by: Solar eclipse of December 4, 2002

=== Solar eclipse of 1913–1917 ===
This eclipse is a member of a semester series. An eclipse in a semester series of solar eclipses repeats approximately every 177 days and 4 hours (a semester) at alternating nodes of the Moon's orbit.

The partial solar eclipses on April 6, 1913 and September 30, 1913 occur in the previous lunar year eclipse set, and the solar eclipses on December 24, 1916 (partial), June 19, 1917 (partial), and December 14, 1917 (annular) occur in the next lunar year eclipse set.

Solar eclipse series sets from 1913 to 1917
Descending node			Ascending node		
Saros	Map	Gamma	Saros	Map	Gamma
114	August 31, 1913 Partial	1.4512	119	February 25, 1914 Annular	−0.9416
124	August 21, 1914 Total	0.7655	129	February 14, 1915 Annular	−0.2024
134	August 10, 1915 Annular	0.0124	139	February 3, 1916 Total	0.4987
144	July 30, 1916 Annular	−0.7709	149	January 23, 1917 Partial	1.1508
154	July 19, 1917 Partial	−1.5101			

=== Saros 139 ===
This eclipse is a part of Saros series 139, repeating every 18 years, 11 days, and containing 71 events. The series started with a partial solar eclipse on May 17, 1501. It contains hybrid eclipses from August 11, 1627 through December 9, 1825 and total eclipses from December 21, 1843 through March 26, 2601. There are no annular eclipses in this set. The series ends at member 71 as a partial eclipse on July 3, 2763. Its eclipses are tabulated in three columns; every third eclipse in the same column is one exeligmos apart, so they all cast shadows over approximately the same parts of the Earth.

The longest duration of totality will be produced by member 61 at 7 minutes, 29.22 seconds on July 16, 2186. This date is the longest solar eclipse computed between 4000 BC and AD 6000. All eclipses in this series occur at the Moon’s ascending node of orbit.

Series members 18–39 occur between 1801 and 2200:
18	19	20
November 29, 1807	December 9, 1825	December 21, 1843
21	22	23
December 31, 1861	January 11, 1880	January 22, 1898
24	25	26
February 3, 1916	February 14, 1934	February 25, 1952
27	28	29
March 7, 1970	March 18, 1988	March 29, 2006
30	31	32
April 8, 2024	April 20, 2042	April 30, 2060
33	34	35
May 11, 2078	May 22, 2096	June 3, 2114
36	37	38
June 13, 2132	June 25, 2150	July 5, 2168
39
July 16, 2186

=== Metonic series ===
The metonic series repeats eclipses every 19 years (6939.69 days), lasting about 5 cycles. Eclipses occur in nearly the same calendar date. In addition, the octon subseries repeats 1/5 of that or every 3.8 years (1387.94 days). All eclipses in this table occur at the Moon's ascending node.

23 eclipse events between February 3, 1859 and June 29, 1946
February 1–3	November 21–22	September 8–10	June 28–29	April 16–18
109	111	113	115	117
February 3, 1859	November 21, 1862		June 28, 1870	April 16, 1874
119	121	123	125	127
February 2, 1878	November 21, 1881	September 8, 1885	June 28, 1889	April 16, 1893
129	131	133	135	137
February 1, 1897	November 22, 1900	September 9, 1904	June 28, 1908	April 17, 1912
139	141	143	145	147
February 3, 1916	November 22, 1919	September 10, 1923	June 29, 1927	April 18, 1931
149	151	153	155	
February 3, 1935	November 21, 1938	September 10, 1942	June 29, 1946	

=== Tritos series ===
This eclipse is a part of a tritos cycle, repeating at alternating nodes every 135 synodic months (≈ 3986.63 days, or 11 years minus 1 month). Their appearance and longitude are irregular due to a lack of synchronization with the anomalistic month (period of perigee), but groupings of 3 tritos cycles (≈ 33 years minus 3 months) come close (≈ 434.044 anomalistic months), so eclipses are similar in these groupings.

The partial solar eclipses on December 18, 2188 (part of Saros 164) and November 18, 2199 (part of Saros 165) are also a part of this series but are not included in the table below.

Series members between 1801 and 2134
December 10, 1806 (Saros 129)	November 9, 1817 (Saros 130)	October 9, 1828 (Saros 131)	September 7, 1839 (Saros 132)	August 7, 1850 (Saros 133)
July 8, 1861 (Saros 134)	June 6, 1872 (Saros 135)	May 6, 1883 (Saros 136)	April 6, 1894 (Saros 137)	March 6, 1905 (Saros 138)
February 3, 1916 (Saros 139)	January 3, 1927 (Saros 140)	December 2, 1937 (Saros 141)	November 1, 1948 (Saros 142)	October 2, 1959 (Saros 143)
August 31, 1970 (Saros 144)	July 31, 1981 (Saros 145)	June 30, 1992 (Saros 146)	May 31, 2003 (Saros 147)	April 29, 2014 (Saros 148)
March 29, 2025 (Saros 149)	February 27, 2036 (Saros 150)	January 26, 2047 (Saros 151)	December 26, 2057 (Saros 152)	November 24, 2068 (Saros 153)
October 24, 2079 (Saros 154)	September 23, 2090 (Saros 155)	August 24, 2101 (Saros 156)	July 23, 2112 (Saros 157)	June 23, 2123 (Saros 158)
May 23, 2134 (Saros 159)

=== Inex series ===
This eclipse is a part of the long period inex cycle, repeating at alternating nodes, every 358 synodic months (≈ 10,571.95 days, or 29 years minus 20 days). Their appearance and longitude are irregular due to a lack of synchronization with the anomalistic month (period of perigee). However, groupings of 3 inex cycles (≈ 87 years minus 2 months) comes close (≈ 1,151.02 anomalistic months), so eclipses are similar in these groupings.

Series members between 1801 and 2200
April 3, 1829 (Saros 136)	March 15, 1858 (Saros 137)	February 22, 1887 (Saros 138)
February 3, 1916 (Saros 139)	January 14, 1945 (Saros 140)	December 24, 1973 (Saros 141)
December 4, 2002 (Saros 142)	November 14, 2031 (Saros 143)	October 24, 2060 (Saros 144)
October 4, 2089 (Saros 145)	September 15, 2118 (Saros 146)	August 26, 2147 (Saros 147)
August 4, 2176 (Saros 148)		
