= Solar eclipse of May 11, 2078 =

Total eclipse

- Total eclipse
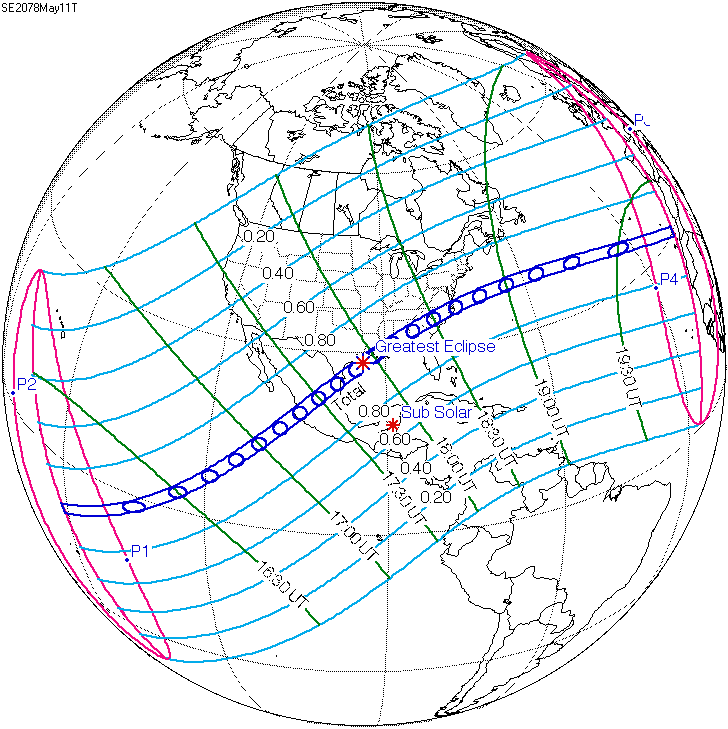
- Map
- Gamma: 0.1838
- Magnitude: 1.0701

Maximum eclipse
- Duration: 340 s (5 min 40 s)
- Coordinates: 28.1°N 93.7°W
- Max. width of band: 232 km (144 mi)

Times (UTC)
- Greatest eclipse: 17:56:55

References
- Saros: 139 (33 of 71)
- Catalog # (SE5000): 9683

A total solar eclipse will occur at the Moon's ascending node of orbit on Wednesday, May 11, 2078, with a magnitude of 1.0701. A solar eclipse occurs when the Moon passes between Earth and the Sun, thereby totally or partly obscuring the image of the Sun for a viewer on Earth. A total solar eclipse occurs when the Moon's apparent diameter is larger than the Sun's, blocking all direct sunlight, turning day into darkness. Totality occurs in a narrow path across Earth's surface, with the partial solar eclipse visible over a surrounding region thousands of kilometres wide. Occurring about 16 hours after perigee (on May 11, 2078, at 2:10 UTC), the Moon's apparent diameter will be larger.

The path of totality will be visible from parts of Kiribati, Mexico, Texas, Louisiana, Mississippi, Alabama, the western Florida panhandle, Georgia, South Carolina, North Carolina, and Virginia, in the United States, and the eastern Canary Islands. A partial solar eclipse will also be visible for parts of Oceania, North America, Central America, the Caribbean, northern South America, Western Europe, and Northwest Africa.

== Path description ==
The path of totality will begin over the Pacific Ocean near Caroline Island, Kiribati. From there, it will track northeast towards North America, making landfall on the Mexican coast. In Mexico, totality will be visible in the cities of Manzanillo, Guadalajara, Aguascalientes, Zacatecas, San Luis Potosí, Ciudad Victoria, and Matamoros, Tamaulipas. The path then briefly crosses into the United States in southern Texas, including McAllen and Brownsville before crossing the Gulf of Mexico. It then re-enters the United States, passing through Louisiana (including New Orleans and Baton Rouge), Mississippi (including Biloxi), Alabama (including Mobile and Montgomery), far northwestern Florida, Georgia (including Atlanta, Athens, and Augusta), South Carolina (including Columbia and Greenville), North Carolina (including Charlotte and Raleigh), and Virginia (including Virginia Beach). It then passes over the Atlantic Ocean and ends near the Canary Islands.

== Eclipse details ==
Shown below are two tables displaying details about this particular solar eclipse. The first table outlines times at which the Moon's penumbra or umbra attains the specific parameter, and the second table describes various other parameters pertaining to this eclipse.

May 11, 2078 Solar Eclipse Times
Event	Time (UTC)
First Penumbral External Contact	2078 May 11 at 15:20:00.9 UTC
First Umbral External Contact	2078 May 11 at 16:14:08.4 UTC
First Central Line	2078 May 11 at 16:15:33.1 UTC
First Umbral Internal Contact	2078 May 11 at 16:16:57.9 UTC
First Penumbral Internal Contact	2078 May 11 at 17:12:36.4 UTC
Greatest Eclipse	2078 May 11 at 17:56:54.8 UTC
Ecliptic Conjunction	2078 May 11 at 17:58:47.4 UTC
Greatest Duration	2078 May 11 at 18:02:17.5 UTC
Equatorial Conjunction	2078 May 11 at 18:04:05.9 UTC
Last Penumbral Internal Contact	2078 May 11 at 18:41:03.0 UTC
Last Umbral Internal Contact	2078 May 11 at 19:36:48.0 UTC
Last Central Line	2078 May 11 at 19:38:12.0 UTC
Last Umbral External Contact	2078 May 11 at 19:39:36.1 UTC
Last Penumbral External Contact	2078 May 11 at 20:33:47.3 UTC

May 11, 2078 Solar Eclipse Parameters
Parameter	Value
Eclipse Magnitude	1.07012
Eclipse Obscuration	1.14516
Gamma	0.18380
Sun Right Ascension	03h16m09.4s
Sun Declination	+18°07'17.6"
Sun Semi-Diameter	15'50.2"
Sun Equatorial Horizontal Parallax	08.7"
Moon Right Ascension	03h15m52.6s
Moon Declination	+18°17'46.7"
Moon Semi-Diameter	16'39.9"
Moon Equatorial Horizontal Parallax	1°01'09.6"
ΔT	104.1 s

== Eclipse season ==
This eclipse is part of an eclipse season, a period, roughly every six months, when eclipses occur. Only two (or occasionally three) eclipse seasons occur each year, and each season lasts about 35 days and repeats just short of six months (173 days) later; thus two full eclipse seasons always occur each year. Either two or three eclipses happen each eclipse season. In the sequence below, each eclipse is separated by a fortnight.

Eclipse season of April–May 2078
April 27 Descending node (full moon)	May 11 Ascending node (new moon)
Penumbral lunar eclipse Lunar Saros 113	Total solar eclipse Solar Saros 139

== Related eclipses ==
=== Eclipses in 2078 ===
- A penumbral lunar eclipse on April 27.
- A total solar eclipse on May 11.
- A penumbral lunar eclipse on October 21.
- An annular solar eclipse on November 4.
- A penumbral lunar eclipse on November 19.

=== Metonic ===
- Preceded by: Solar eclipse of July 24, 2074
- Followed by: Solar eclipse of February 27, 2082

=== Tzolkinex ===
- Preceded by: Solar eclipse of March 31, 2071
- Followed by: Solar eclipse of June 22, 2085

=== Half-Saros ===
- Preceded by: Lunar eclipse of May 6, 2069
- Followed by: Lunar eclipse of May 17, 2087

=== Tritos ===
- Preceded by: Solar eclipse of June 11, 2067
- Followed by: Solar eclipse of April 10, 2089

=== Solar Saros 139 ===
- Preceded by: Solar eclipse of April 30, 2060
- Followed by: Solar eclipse of May 22, 2096

=== Inex ===
- Preceded by: Solar eclipse of May 31, 2049
- Followed by: Solar eclipse of April 23, 2107

=== Triad ===
- Preceded by: Solar eclipse of July 11, 1991
- Followed by: Solar eclipse of March 12, 2165

=== Solar eclipses of 2076–2079 ===
This eclipse is a member of a semester series. An eclipse in a semester series of solar eclipses repeats approximately every 177 days and 4 hours (a semester) at alternating nodes of the Moon's orbit.

The partial solar eclipses on January 6, 2076 and July 1, 2076 occur in the previous lunar year eclipse set.

Solar eclipse series sets from 2076 to 2079
Ascending node			Descending node		
Saros	Map	Gamma	Saros	Map	Gamma
119	June 1, 2076 Partial	−1.3897	124	November 26, 2076 Partial	1.1401
129	May 22, 2077 Total	−0.5725	134	November 15, 2077 Annular	0.4705
139	May 11, 2078 Total	0.1838	144	November 4, 2078 Annular	−0.2285
149	May 1, 2079 Total	0.9081	154	October 24, 2079 Annular	−0.9243

=== Saros 139 ===
This eclipse is a part of Saros series 139, repeating every 18 years, 11 days, and containing 71 events. The series started with a partial solar eclipse on May 17, 1501. It contains hybrid eclipses from August 11, 1627 through December 9, 1825 and total eclipses from December 21, 1843 through March 26, 2601. There are no annular eclipses in this set. The series ends at member 71 as a partial eclipse on July 3, 2763. Its eclipses are tabulated in three columns; every third eclipse in the same column is one exeligmos apart, so they all cast shadows over approximately the same parts of the Earth.

The longest duration of totality will be produced by member 61 at 7 minutes, 29.22 seconds on July 16, 2186. This date is the longest solar eclipse computed between 4000 BC and AD 6000. All eclipses in this series occur at the Moon’s ascending node of orbit.

Series members 18–39 occur between 1801 and 2200:
18	19	20
November 29, 1807	December 9, 1825	December 21, 1843
21	22	23
December 31, 1861	January 11, 1880	January 22, 1898
24	25	26
February 3, 1916	February 14, 1934	February 25, 1952
27	28	29
March 7, 1970	March 18, 1988	March 29, 2006
30	31	32
April 8, 2024	April 20, 2042	April 30, 2060
33	34	35
May 11, 2078	May 22, 2096	June 3, 2114
36	37	38
June 13, 2132	June 25, 2150	July 5, 2168
39
July 16, 2186

=== Metonic series ===
The metonic series repeats eclipses every 19 years (6939.69 days), lasting about 5 cycles. Eclipses occur in nearly the same calendar date. In addition, the octon subseries repeats 1/5 of that or every 3.8 years (1387.94 days). All eclipses in this table occur at the Moon's ascending node.

21 eclipse events between July 23, 2036 and July 23, 2112
July 23–24	May 11	February 27–28	December 16–17	October 4–5
117	119	121	123	125
July 23, 2036	May 11, 2040	February 28, 2044	December 16, 2047	October 4, 2051
127	129	131	133	135
July 24, 2055	May 11, 2059	February 28, 2063	December 17, 2066	October 4, 2070
137	139	141	143	145
July 24, 2074	May 11, 2078	February 27, 2082	December 16, 2085	October 4, 2089
147	149	151	153	155
July 23, 2093	May 11, 2097	February 28, 2101	December 17, 2104	October 5, 2108
157
July 23, 2112

=== Tritos series ===
This eclipse is a part of a tritos cycle, repeating at alternating nodes every 135 synodic months (≈ 3986.63 days, or 11 years minus 1 month). Their appearance and longitude are irregular due to a lack of synchronization with the anomalistic month (period of perigee), but groupings of 3 tritos cycles (≈ 33 years minus 3 months) come close (≈ 434.044 anomalistic months), so eclipses are similar in these groupings.

Series members between 1801 and 2200
June 26, 1805 (Saros 114)	May 27, 1816 (Saros 115)	April 26, 1827 (Saros 116)	March 25, 1838 (Saros 117)	February 23, 1849 (Saros 118)
January 23, 1860 (Saros 119)	December 22, 1870 (Saros 120)	November 21, 1881 (Saros 121)	October 20, 1892 (Saros 122)	September 21, 1903 (Saros 123)
August 21, 1914 (Saros 124)	July 20, 1925 (Saros 125)	June 19, 1936 (Saros 126)	May 20, 1947 (Saros 127)	April 19, 1958 (Saros 128)
March 18, 1969 (Saros 129)	February 16, 1980 (Saros 130)	January 15, 1991 (Saros 131)	December 14, 2001 (Saros 132)	November 13, 2012 (Saros 133)
October 14, 2023 (Saros 134)	September 12, 2034 (Saros 135)	August 12, 2045 (Saros 136)	July 12, 2056 (Saros 137)	June 11, 2067 (Saros 138)
May 11, 2078 (Saros 139)	April 10, 2089 (Saros 140)	March 10, 2100 (Saros 141)	February 8, 2111 (Saros 142)	January 8, 2122 (Saros 143)
December 7, 2132 (Saros 144)	November 7, 2143 (Saros 145)	October 7, 2154 (Saros 146)	September 5, 2165 (Saros 147)	August 4, 2176 (Saros 148)
July 6, 2187 (Saros 149)	June 4, 2198 (Saros 150)			

=== Inex series ===
This eclipse is a part of the long period inex cycle, repeating at alternating nodes, every 358 synodic months (≈ 10,571.95 days, or 29 years minus 20 days). Their appearance and longitude are irregular due to a lack of synchronization with the anomalistic month (period of perigee). However, groupings of 3 inex cycles (≈ 87 years minus 2 months) comes close (≈ 1,151.02 anomalistic months), so eclipses are similar in these groupings.

Series members between 1801 and 2200
November 9, 1817 (Saros 130)	October 20, 1846 (Saros 131)	September 29, 1875 (Saros 132)
September 9, 1904 (Saros 133)	August 21, 1933 (Saros 134)	July 31, 1962 (Saros 135)
July 11, 1991 (Saros 136)	June 21, 2020 (Saros 137)	May 31, 2049 (Saros 138)
May 11, 2078 (Saros 139)	April 23, 2107 (Saros 140)	April 1, 2136 (Saros 141)
March 12, 2165 (Saros 142)	February 21, 2194 (Saros 143)	
