= Solar eclipse of January 22, 1898 =

Total eclipse

- Total eclipse
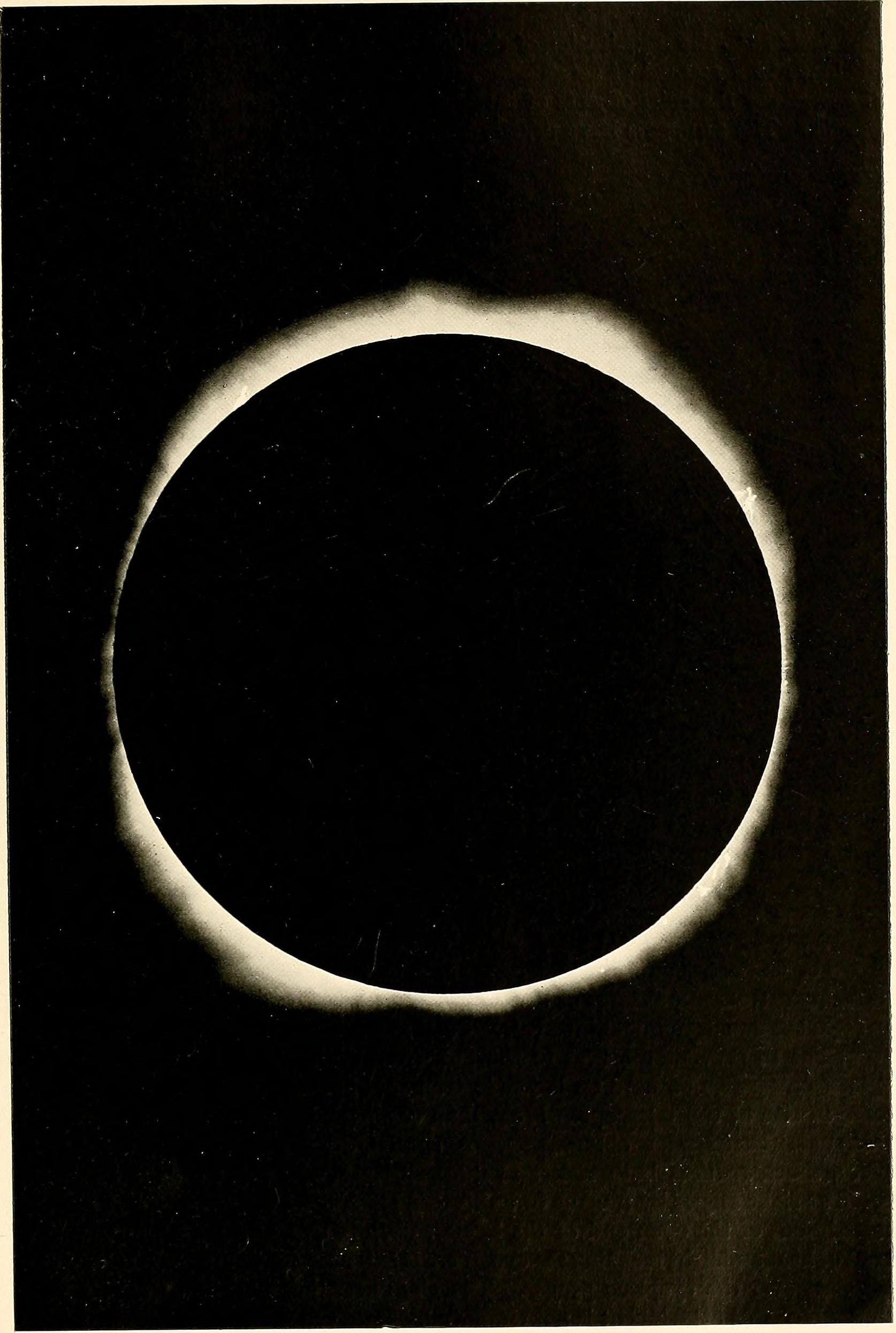

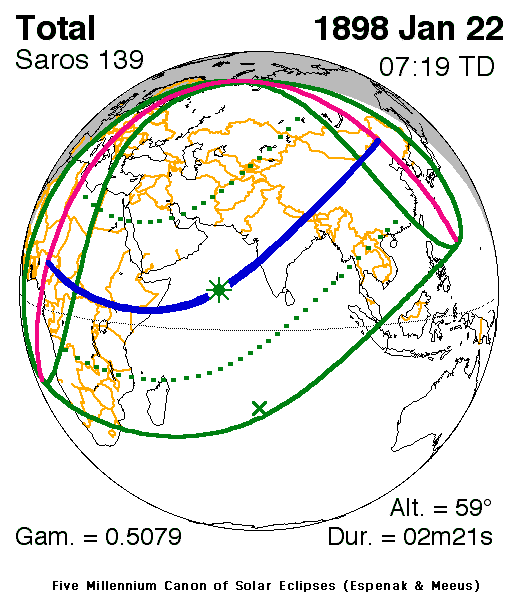
- Map
- Gamma: 0.5079
- Magnitude: 1.0244

Maximum eclipse
- Duration: 141 s (2 min 21 s)
- Coordinates: 9.5°N 63.6°E
- Max. width of band: 96 km (60 mi)

Times (UTC)
- Greatest eclipse: 7:19:12

References
- Saros: 139 (23 of 71)
- Catalog # (SE5000): 9275

A total solar eclipse occurred at the Moon's ascending node of orbit on Saturday, January 22, 1898. A solar eclipse occurs when the Moon passes between Earth and the Sun, thereby totally or partly obscuring the image of the Sun for a viewer on Earth. A total solar eclipse occurs when the Moon's apparent diameter is larger than the Sun's, blocking all direct sunlight, turning day into darkness. Totality occurs in a narrow path across Earth's surface, with the partial solar eclipse visible over a surrounding region thousands of kilometres wide. Occurring about 1.8 days after perigee (on January 20, 1898, at 12:30 UTC), the Moon's apparent diameter was larger.

The path of totality was visible from parts of the Royal Niger Company, Kamerun, Upper Ubanghi, British East Africa, Abyssinia, Italian Somaliland, Hindustan, Nepal, and the Chinese Empire. A partial solar eclipse was also visible for much of Africa, Europe, and Asia.

== Observations ==
1.5 second exposure	9 second exposure	Annie Maunder
Wide view of streamers with the planet Venus
Sketch

There were two organised expeditions to India to observe this eclipse. One was from the British Astronomical Association and the other was led by K D Naegamvala of the Maharaja Taihtasingji Observatory.

== Eclipse details ==
Shown below are two tables displaying details about this particular solar eclipse. The first table outlines times at which the Moon's penumbra or umbra attains the specific parameter, and the second table describes various other parameters pertaining to this eclipse.

January 22, 1898 Solar Eclipse Times
Event	Time (UTC)
First Penumbral External Contact	1898 January 22 at 04:45:48.1 UTC
First Umbral External Contact	1898 January 22 at 05:48:14.1 UTC
First Central Line	1898 January 22 at 05:48:33.2 UTC
First Umbral Internal Contact	1898 January 22 at 05:48:52.2 UTC
Greatest Duration	1898 January 22 at 07:14:10.5 UTC
Greatest Eclipse	1898 January 22 at 07:19:11.8 UTC
Ecliptic Conjunction	1898 January 22 at 07:24:30.5 UTC
Equatorial Conjunction	1898 January 22 at 07:37:20.4 UTC
Last Umbral Internal Contact	1898 January 22 at 08:49:22.0 UTC
Last Central Line	1898 January 22 at 08:49:39.2 UTC
Last Umbral External Contact	1898 January 22 at 08:49:56.3 UTC
Last Penumbral External Contact	1898 January 22 at 09:52:32.1 UTC

January 22, 1898 Solar Eclipse Parameters
Parameter	Value
Eclipse Magnitude	1.02440
Eclipse Obscuration	1.04940
Gamma	0.50791
Sun Right Ascension	20h18m29.6s
Sun Declination	-19°38'50.6"
Sun Semi-Diameter	16'14.8"
Sun Equatorial Horizontal Parallax	08.9"
Moon Right Ascension	20h17m48.1s
Moon Declination	-19°09'57.2"
Moon Semi-Diameter	16'24.3"
Moon Equatorial Horizontal Parallax	1°00'12.5"
ΔT	-4.9 s

== Eclipse season ==
This eclipse is part of an eclipse season, a period, roughly every six months, when eclipses occur. Only two (or occasionally three) eclipse seasons occur each year, and each season lasts about 35 days and repeats just short of six months (173 days) later; thus two full eclipse seasons always occur each year. Either two or three eclipses happen each eclipse season. In the sequence below, each eclipse is separated by a fortnight.

Eclipse season of January 1898
January 8 Descending node (full moon)	January 22 Ascending node (new moon)
Partial lunar eclipse Lunar Saros 113	Total solar eclipse Solar Saros 139

== Related eclipses ==
=== Eclipses in 1898 ===
- A partial lunar eclipse on January 8.
- A total solar eclipse on January 22.
- A partial lunar eclipse on July 3.
- An annular solar eclipse on July 18.
- A partial solar eclipse on December 13.
- A total lunar eclipse on December 27.

=== Metonic ===
- Preceded by: Solar eclipse of April 6, 1894
- Followed by: Solar eclipse of November 11, 1901

=== Tzolkinex ===
- Preceded by: Solar eclipse of December 12, 1890
- Followed by: Solar eclipse of March 6, 1905

=== Half-Saros ===
- Preceded by: Lunar eclipse of January 17, 1889
- Followed by: Lunar eclipse of January 29, 1907

=== Tritos ===
- Preceded by: Solar eclipse of February 22, 1887
- Followed by: Solar eclipse of December 23, 1908

=== Solar Saros 139 ===
- Preceded by: Solar eclipse of January 11, 1880
- Followed by: Solar eclipse of February 3, 1916

=== Inex ===
- Preceded by: Solar eclipse of February 11, 1869
- Followed by: Solar eclipse of January 3, 1927

=== Triad ===
- Preceded by: Solar eclipse of March 24, 1811
- Followed by: Solar eclipse of November 22, 1984

=== Solar eclipses of 1895–1899 ===
This eclipse is a member of a semester series. An eclipse in a semester series of solar eclipses repeats approximately every 177 days and 4 hours (a semester) at alternating nodes of the Moon's orbit.

The partial solar eclipses on March 26, 1895 and September 18, 1895 occur in the previous lunar year eclipse set, and the partial solar eclipse on December 13, 1898 occurs in the next lunar year eclipse set.

Solar eclipse series sets from 1895 to 1899
Descending node			Ascending node		
Saros	Map	Gamma	Saros	Map	Gamma
114	August 20, 1895 Partial	1.3911	119	February 13, 1896 Annular	−0.9220
124	August 9, 1896 Total	0.6964	129	February 1, 1897 Annular	−0.1903
134	July 29, 1897 Annular	−0.0640	139	January 22, 1898 Total	0.5079
144	July 18, 1898 Annular	−0.8546	149	January 11, 1899 Partial	1.1558

=== Saros 139 ===
This eclipse is a part of Saros series 139, repeating every 18 years, 11 days, and containing 71 events. The series started with a partial solar eclipse on May 17, 1501. It contains hybrid eclipses from August 11, 1627 through December 9, 1825 and total eclipses from December 21, 1843 through March 26, 2601. There are no annular eclipses in this set. The series ends at member 71 as a partial eclipse on July 3, 2763. Its eclipses are tabulated in three columns; every third eclipse in the same column is one exeligmos apart, so they all cast shadows over approximately the same parts of the Earth.

The longest duration of totality will be produced by member 61 at 7 minutes, 29.22 seconds on July 16, 2186. This date is the longest solar eclipse computed between 4000 BC and AD 6000. All eclipses in this series occur at the Moon’s ascending node of orbit.

Series members 18–39 occur between 1801 and 2200:
18	19	20
November 29, 1807	December 9, 1825	December 21, 1843
21	22	23
December 31, 1861	January 11, 1880	January 22, 1898
24	25	26
February 3, 1916	February 14, 1934	February 25, 1952
27	28	29
March 7, 1970	March 18, 1988	March 29, 2006
30	31	32
April 8, 2024	April 20, 2042	April 30, 2060
33	34	35
May 11, 2078	May 22, 2096	June 3, 2114
36	37	38
June 13, 2132	June 25, 2150	July 5, 2168
39
July 16, 2186

=== Metonic series ===
The metonic series repeats eclipses every 19 years (6939.69 days), lasting about 5 cycles. Eclipses occur in nearly the same calendar date. In addition, the octon subseries repeats 1/5 of that or every 3.8 years (1387.94 days). All eclipses in this table occur at the Moon's ascending node.

25 eclipse events between April 5, 1837 and June 17, 1928
April 5–6	January 22–23	November 10–11	August 28–30	June 17–18
107	109	111	113	115
April 5, 1837	January 22, 1841	November 10, 1844	August 28, 1848	June 17, 1852
117	119	121	123	125
April 5, 1856	January 23, 1860	November 11, 1863	August 29, 1867	June 18, 1871
127	129	131	133	135
April 6, 1875	January 22, 1879	November 10, 1882	August 29, 1886	June 17, 1890
137	139	141	143	145
April 6, 1894	January 22, 1898	November 11, 1901	August 30, 1905	June 17, 1909
147	149	151	153	155
April 6, 1913	January 23, 1917	November 10, 1920	August 30, 1924	June 17, 1928

=== Tritos series ===
This eclipse is a part of a tritos cycle, repeating at alternating nodes every 135 synodic months (≈ 3986.63 days, or 11 years minus 1 month). Their appearance and longitude are irregular due to a lack of synchronization with the anomalistic month (period of perigee), but groupings of 3 tritos cycles (≈ 33 years minus 3 months) come close (≈ 434.044 anomalistic months), so eclipses are similar in these groupings.

The partial solar eclipses on December 7, 2170 (part of Saros 164) and November 7, 2181 (part of Saros 165) are also a part of this series but are not included in the table below.

Series members between 1801 and 2105
September 28, 1810 (Saros 131)	August 27, 1821 (Saros 132)	July 27, 1832 (Saros 133)	June 27, 1843 (Saros 134)	May 26, 1854 (Saros 135)
April 25, 1865 (Saros 136)	March 25, 1876 (Saros 137)	February 22, 1887 (Saros 138)	January 22, 1898 (Saros 139)	December 23, 1908 (Saros 140)
November 22, 1919 (Saros 141)	October 21, 1930 (Saros 142)	September 21, 1941 (Saros 143)	August 20, 1952 (Saros 144)	July 20, 1963 (Saros 145)
June 20, 1974 (Saros 146)	May 19, 1985 (Saros 147)	April 17, 1996 (Saros 148)	March 19, 2007 (Saros 149)	February 15, 2018 (Saros 150)
January 14, 2029 (Saros 151)	December 15, 2039 (Saros 152)	November 14, 2050 (Saros 153)	October 13, 2061 (Saros 154)	September 12, 2072 (Saros 155)
August 13, 2083 (Saros 156)	July 12, 2094 (Saros 157)	June 12, 2105 (Saros 158)		

=== Inex series ===
This eclipse is a part of the long period inex cycle, repeating at alternating nodes, every 358 synodic months (≈ 10,571.95 days, or 29 years minus 20 days). Their appearance and longitude are irregular due to a lack of synchronization with the anomalistic month (period of perigee). However, groupings of 3 inex cycles (≈ 87 years minus 2 months) comes close (≈ 1,151.02 anomalistic months), so eclipses are similar in these groupings.

Series members between 1801 and 2200
March 24, 1811 (Saros 136)	March 4, 1840 (Saros 137)	February 11, 1869 (Saros 138)
January 22, 1898 (Saros 139)	January 3, 1927 (Saros 140)	December 14, 1955 (Saros 141)
November 22, 1984 (Saros 142)	November 3, 2013 (Saros 143)	October 14, 2042 (Saros 144)
September 23, 2071 (Saros 145)	September 4, 2100 (Saros 146)	August 15, 2129 (Saros 147)
July 25, 2158 (Saros 148)	July 6, 2187 (Saros 149)	
