= Solar eclipse of May 22, 2096 =

Total eclipse

- Total eclipse
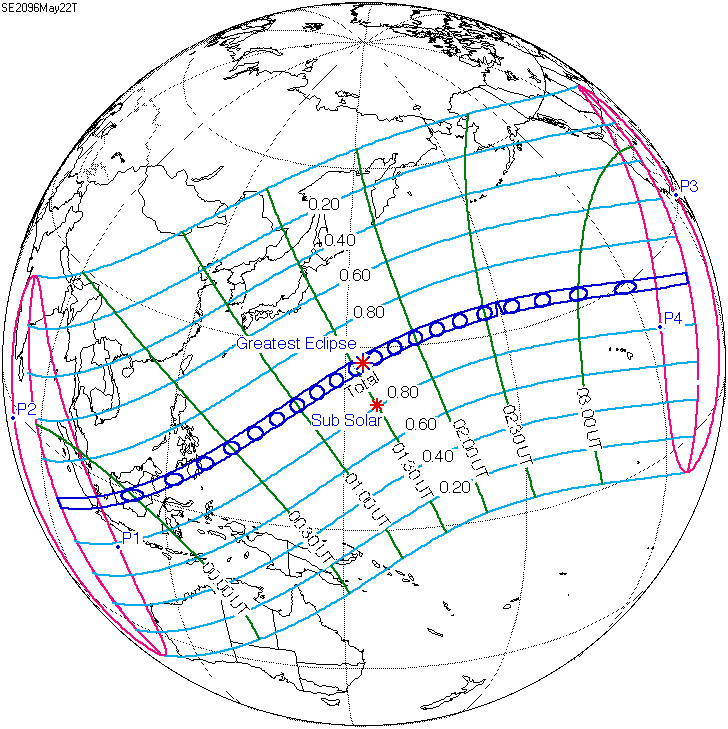
- Map
- Gamma: 0.1196
- Magnitude: 1.0737

Maximum eclipse
- Duration: 367 s (6 min 7 s)
- Coordinates: 27.3°N 153.4°E
- Max. width of band: 241 km (150 mi)

Times (UTC)
- Greatest eclipse: 1:37:14

References
- Saros: 139 (34 of 71)
- Catalog # (SE5000): 9724

A total solar eclipse will occur at the Moon's ascending node of orbit between Monday, May 21 and Tuesday, May 22, 2096, with a magnitude of 1.0737. A solar eclipse occurs when the Moon passes between Earth and the Sun, thereby totally or partly obscuring the image of the Sun for a viewer on Earth. A total solar eclipse occurs when the Moon's apparent diameter is larger than the Sun's, blocking all direct sunlight, turning day into darkness. Totality occurs in a narrow path across Earth's surface, with the partial solar eclipse visible over a surrounding region thousands of kilometres wide. Occurring about 13 hours after perigee (on May 21, 2096, at 12:30 UTC), the Moon's apparent diameter will be larger.

The path of totality will be visible from parts of Indonesia and the Philippines. Totality will end approximately 1000 miles (1600 km) off the United States West Coast. A partial solar eclipse will also be visible for parts of Southeast Asia, East Asia, northern Australia, Hawaii, and northwestern North America.

Overall, at 6 minutes and 7 seconds, this will be the third longest total solar eclipse of the 21st century. The only two longer eclipses in the century are July 22, 2009 and August 2, 2027. The longest duration of this eclipse on land will be seen in Surigao del Sur, the Philippines, 4 minutes and 38 seconds.

This will be the first eclipse of saros series 139 to exceed series 136 in length of totality. The length of totality for saros 139 is increasing, while that of Saros 136 is decreasing.

== Eclipse details ==
Shown below are two tables displaying details about this particular solar eclipse. The first table outlines times at which the Moon's penumbra or umbra attains the specific parameter, and the second table describes various other parameters pertaining to this eclipse.

May 22, 2096 Solar Eclipse Times
Event	Time (UTC)
First Penumbral External Contact	2096 May 21 at 22:59:57.5 UTC
First Umbral External Contact	2096 May 21 at 23:53:30.4 UTC
First Central Line	2096 May 21 at 23:54:59.3 UTC
First Umbral Internal Contact	2096 May 21 at 23:56:28.1 UTC
First Penumbral Internal Contact	2096 May 22 at 00:50:37.3 UTC
Greatest Eclipse	2096 May 22 at 01:37:14.1 UTC
Ecliptic Conjunction	2096 May 22 at 01:38:27.4 UTC
Equatorial Conjunction	2096 May 22 at 01:41:02.1 UTC
Greatest Duration	2096 May 22 at 01:42:24.7 UTC
Last Penumbral Internal Contact	2096 May 22 at 02:23:45.4 UTC
Last Umbral Internal Contact	2096 May 22 at 03:17:58.5 UTC
Last Central Line	2096 May 22 at 03:19:26.7 UTC
Last Umbral External Contact	2096 May 22 at 03:20:54.9 UTC
Last Penumbral External Contact	2096 May 22 at 04:14:30.6 UTC

May 22, 2096 Solar Eclipse Parameters
Parameter	Value
Eclipse Magnitude	1.07371
Eclipse Obscuration	1.15285
Gamma	0.11960
Sun Right Ascension	03h59m45.5s
Sun Declination	+20°33'28.2"
Sun Semi-Diameter	15'48.1"
Sun Equatorial Horizontal Parallax	08.7"
Moon Right Ascension	03h59m36.3s
Moon Declination	+20°40'26.9"
Moon Semi-Diameter	16'40.8"
Moon Equatorial Horizontal Parallax	1°01'13.0"
ΔT	120.1 s

== Eclipse season ==
This eclipse is part of an eclipse season, a period, roughly every six months, when eclipses occur. Only two (or occasionally three) eclipse seasons occur each year, and each season lasts about 35 days and repeats just short of six months (173 days) later; thus two full eclipse seasons always occur each year. Either two or three eclipses happen each eclipse season. In the sequence below, each eclipse is separated by a fortnight. The first and last eclipse in this sequence is separated by one synodic month.

Eclipse season of May–June 2096
May 7 Descending node (full moon)	May 22 Ascending node (new moon)	June 6 Descending node (full moon)
Penumbral lunar eclipse Lunar Saros 113	Total solar eclipse Solar Saros 139	Penumbral lunar eclipse Lunar Saros 151

== Related eclipses ==
=== Eclipses in 2096 ===
- A penumbral lunar eclipse on May 7.
- A total solar eclipse on May 21–22.
- A penumbral lunar eclipse on June 5–6.
- A penumbral lunar eclipse on October 31.
- An annular solar eclipse on November 14–15.
- A penumbral lunar eclipse on November 29.

=== Metonic ===
- Preceded by: Solar eclipse of August 3, 2092
- Followed by: Solar eclipse of March 10, 2100

=== Tzolkinex ===
- Preceded by: Solar eclipse of April 10, 2089
- Followed by: Solar eclipse of July 4, 2103

=== Half-Saros ===
- Preceded by: Lunar eclipse of May 17, 2087
- Followed by: Lunar eclipse of May 28, 2105

=== Tritos ===
- Preceded by: Solar eclipse of June 22, 2085
- Followed by: Solar eclipse of April 23, 2107

=== Solar Saros 139 ===
- Preceded by: Solar eclipse of May 11, 2078
- Followed by: Solar eclipse of June 3, 2114

=== Inex ===
- Preceded by: Solar eclipse of June 11, 2067
- Followed by: Solar eclipse of May 3, 2125

=== Triad ===
- Preceded by: Solar eclipse of July 22, 2009
- Followed by: Solar eclipse of March 23, 2183

=== Solar eclipses of 2094–2098 ===
This eclipse is a member of a semester series. An eclipse in a semester series of solar eclipses repeats approximately every 177 days and 4 hours (a semester) at alternating nodes of the Moon's orbit.

The solar eclipses on January 16, 2094 (total) and July 12, 2094 (partial) occur in the previous lunar year eclipse set, and the partial solar eclipses on April 1, 2098 and September 25, 2098 occur in the next lunar year eclipse set.

Solar eclipse series sets from 2094 to 2098
Ascending node			Descending node		
Saros	Map	Gamma	Saros	Map	Gamma
119	June 13, 2094 Partial	−1.4613	124	December 7, 2094 Partial	1.1547
129	June 2, 2095 Total	−0.6396	134	November 27, 2095 Annular	0.4903
139	May 22, 2096 Total	0.1196	144	November 15, 2096 Annular	−0.20
149	May 11, 2097 Total	0.8516	154	November 4, 2097 Annular	−0.8926
159	May 1, 2098		164	October 24, 2098 Partial	−1.5407

=== Saros 139 ===
This eclipse is a part of Saros series 139, repeating every 18 years, 11 days, and containing 71 events. The series started with a partial solar eclipse on May 17, 1501. It contains hybrid eclipses from August 11, 1627 through December 9, 1825 and total eclipses from December 21, 1843 through March 26, 2601. There are no annular eclipses in this set. The series ends at member 71 as a partial eclipse on July 3, 2763. Its eclipses are tabulated in three columns; every third eclipse in the same column is one exeligmos apart, so they all cast shadows over approximately the same parts of the Earth.

The longest duration of totality will be produced by member 61 at 7 minutes, 29.22 seconds on July 16, 2186. This date is the longest solar eclipse computed between 4000 BC and AD 6000. All eclipses in this series occur at the Moon’s ascending node of orbit.

Series members 18–39 occur between 1801 and 2200:
18	19	20
November 29, 1807	December 9, 1825	December 21, 1843
21	22	23
December 31, 1861	January 11, 1880	January 22, 1898
24	25	26
February 3, 1916	February 14, 1934	February 25, 1952
27	28	29
March 7, 1970	March 18, 1988	March 29, 2006
30	31	32
April 8, 2024	April 20, 2042	April 30, 2060
33	34	35
May 11, 2078	May 22, 2096	June 3, 2114
36	37	38
June 13, 2132	June 25, 2150	July 5, 2168
39
July 16, 2186

=== Metonic series ===
The metonic series repeats eclipses every 19 years (6939.69 days), lasting about 5 cycles. Eclipses occur in nearly the same calendar date. In addition, the octon subseries repeats 1/5 of that or every 3.8 years (1387.94 days). All eclipses in this table occur at the Moon's ascending node.

23 eclipse events between August 3, 2054 and October 16, 2145
August 3–4	May 22–24	March 10–11	December 27–29	October 14–16
117	119	121	123	125
August 3, 2054	May 22, 2058	March 11, 2062	December 27, 2065	October 15, 2069
127	129	131	133	135
August 3, 2073	May 22, 2077	March 10, 2081	December 27, 2084	October 14, 2088
137	139	141	143	145
August 3, 2092	May 22, 2096	March 10, 2100	December 29, 2103	October 16, 2107
147	149	151	153	155
August 4, 2111	May 24, 2115	March 11, 2119	December 28, 2122	October 16, 2126
157	159	161	163	165
August 4, 2130	May 23, 2134			October 16, 2145

=== Tritos series ===
This eclipse is a part of a tritos cycle, repeating at alternating nodes every 135 synodic months (≈ 3986.63 days, or 11 years minus 1 month). Their appearance and longitude are irregular due to a lack of synchronization with the anomalistic month (period of perigee), but groupings of 3 tritos cycles (≈ 33 years minus 3 months) come close (≈ 434.044 anomalistic months), so eclipses are similar in these groupings.

Series members between 1801 and 2200
September 8, 1801 (Saros 112)	August 7, 1812 (Saros 113)	July 8, 1823 (Saros 114)	June 7, 1834 (Saros 115)	May 6, 1845 (Saros 116)
April 5, 1856 (Saros 117)	March 6, 1867 (Saros 118)	February 2, 1878 (Saros 119)	January 1, 1889 (Saros 120)	December 3, 1899 (Saros 121)
November 2, 1910 (Saros 122)	October 1, 1921 (Saros 123)	August 31, 1932 (Saros 124)	August 1, 1943 (Saros 125)	June 30, 1954 (Saros 126)
May 30, 1965 (Saros 127)	April 29, 1976 (Saros 128)	March 29, 1987 (Saros 129)	February 26, 1998 (Saros 130)	January 26, 2009 (Saros 131)
December 26, 2019 (Saros 132)	November 25, 2030 (Saros 133)	October 25, 2041 (Saros 134)	September 22, 2052 (Saros 135)	August 24, 2063 (Saros 136)
July 24, 2074 (Saros 137)	June 22, 2085 (Saros 138)	May 22, 2096 (Saros 139)	April 23, 2107 (Saros 140)	March 22, 2118 (Saros 141)
February 18, 2129 (Saros 142)	January 20, 2140 (Saros 143)	December 19, 2150 (Saros 144)	November 17, 2161 (Saros 145)	October 17, 2172 (Saros 146)
September 16, 2183 (Saros 147)	August 16, 2194 (Saros 148)			

=== Inex series ===
This eclipse is a part of the long period inex cycle, repeating at alternating nodes, every 358 synodic months (≈ 10,571.95 days, or 29 years minus 20 days). Their appearance and longitude are irregular due to a lack of synchronization with the anomalistic month (period of perigee). However, groupings of 3 inex cycles (≈ 87 years minus 2 months) comes close (≈ 1,151.02 anomalistic months), so eclipses are similar in these groupings.

Series members between 1801 and 2200
December 10, 1806 (Saros 129)	November 20, 1835 (Saros 130)	October 30, 1864 (Saros 131)
October 9, 1893 (Saros 132)	September 21, 1922 (Saros 133)	September 1, 1951 (Saros 134)
August 10, 1980 (Saros 135)	July 22, 2009 (Saros 136)	July 2, 2038 (Saros 137)
June 11, 2067 (Saros 138)	May 22, 2096 (Saros 139)	May 3, 2125 (Saros 140)
April 12, 2154 (Saros 141)	March 23, 2183 (Saros 142)	
