= Solar eclipse of April 30, 2060 =

Total eclipse

- Total eclipse
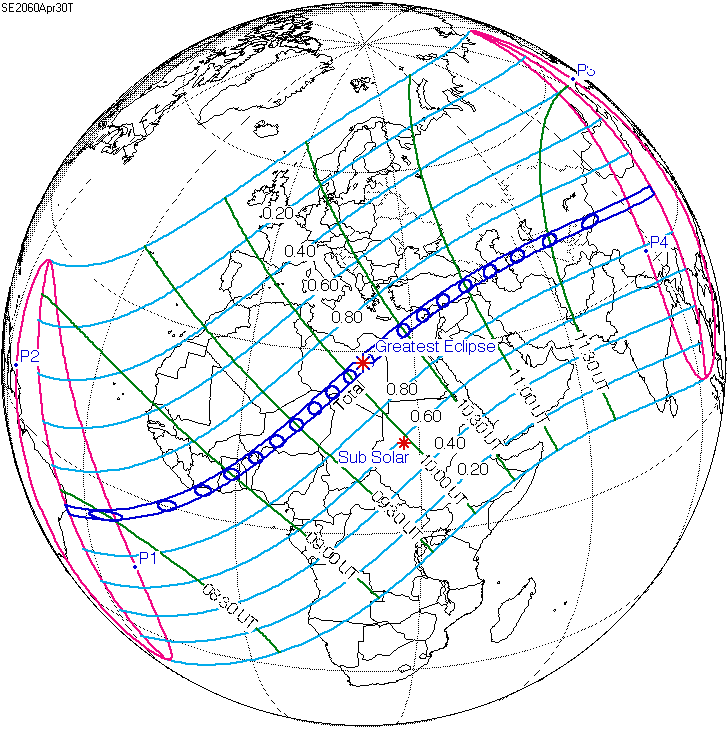
- Map
- Gamma: 0.2422
- Magnitude: 1.066

Maximum eclipse
- Duration: 315 s (5 min 15 s)
- Coordinates: 28°N 20.9°E
- Max. width of band: 222 km (138 mi)

Times (UTC)
- Greatest eclipse: 10:10:00

References
- Saros: 139 (32 of 71)
- Catalog # (SE5000): 9642

A total solar eclipse will occur at the Moon's ascending node of orbit on Friday, April 30, 2060, with a magnitude of 1.066. A solar eclipse occurs when the Moon passes between Earth and the Sun, thereby totally or partly obscuring the image of the Sun for a viewer on Earth. A total solar eclipse occurs when the Moon's apparent diameter is larger than the Sun's, blocking all direct sunlight, turning day into darkness. Totality occurs in a narrow path across Earth's surface, with the partial solar eclipse visible over a surrounding region thousands of kilometres wide. Occurring about 18 hours after perigee (on April 29, 2060, at 15:50 UTC), the Moon's apparent diameter will be larger.

The path of totality will be visible from parts of Côte d'Ivoire, Ghana, Togo, Benin, eastern Burkina Faso, northwestern Nigeria, Niger, northwestern Chad, Libya, northwestern Egypt, Cyprus, Turkey, northwestern Syria, Armenia, Azerbaijan, northwestern Iran, Turkmenistan, Uzbekistan, southern Kazakhstan, Kyrgyzstan, and China. A partial solar eclipse will also be visible for much of eastern Brazil, Africa, Europe, and Asia.

== Eclipse details ==
Shown below are two tables displaying details about this particular solar eclipse. The first table outlines times at which the Moon's penumbra or umbra attains the specific parameter, and the second table describes various other parameters pertaining to this eclipse.

April 30, 2060 Solar Eclipse Times
Event	Time (UTC)
First Penumbral External Contact	2060 April 30 at 07:33:37.4 UTC
First Umbral External Contact	2060 April 30 at 08:28:28.1 UTC
First Central Line	2060 April 30 at 08:29:48.2 UTC
First Umbral Internal Contact	2060 April 30 at 08:31:08.2 UTC
First Penumbral Internal Contact	2060 April 30 at 09:28:50.5 UTC
Greatest Eclipse	2060 April 30 at 10:09:59.8 UTC
Ecliptic Conjunction	2060 April 30 at 10:12:28.4 UTC
Greatest Duration	2060 April 30 at 10:14:55.2 UTC
Equatorial Conjunction	2060 April 30 at 10:21:02.0 UTC
Last Penumbral Internal Contact	2060 April 30 at 10:50:53.8 UTC
Last Umbral Internal Contact	2060 April 30 at 11:48:45.5 UTC
Last Central Line	2060 April 30 at 11:50:04.8 UTC
Last Umbral External Contact	2060 April 30 at 11:51:24.0 UTC
Last Penumbral External Contact	2060 April 30 at 12:46:19.7 UTC

April 30, 2060 Solar Eclipse Parameters
Parameter	Value
Eclipse Magnitude	1.06600
Eclipse Obscuration	1.13636
Gamma	0.24217
Sun Right Ascension	02h33m38.4s
Sun Declination	+15°04'16.7"
Sun Semi-Diameter	15'52.6"
Sun Equatorial Horizontal Parallax	08.7"
Moon Right Ascension	02h33m13.6s
Moon Declination	+15°17'46.8"
Moon Semi-Diameter	16'38.8"
Moon Equatorial Horizontal Parallax	1°01'05.8"
ΔT	90.6 s

== Eclipse season ==
This eclipse is part of an eclipse season, a period, roughly every six months, when eclipses occur. Only two (or occasionally three) eclipse seasons occur each year, and each season lasts about 35 days and repeats just short of six months (173 days) later; thus two full eclipse seasons always occur each year. Either two or three eclipses happen each eclipse season. In the sequence below, each eclipse is separated by a fortnight.

Eclipse season of April 2060
April 15 Descending node (full moon)	April 30 Ascending node (new moon)
Penumbral lunar eclipse Lunar Saros 113	Total solar eclipse Solar Saros 139

== Related eclipses ==
=== Eclipses in 2060 ===
- A penumbral lunar eclipse on April 15.
- A total solar eclipse on April 30.
- A penumbral lunar eclipse on October 9.
- An annular solar eclipse on October 24.
- A penumbral lunar eclipse on November 8.

=== Metonic ===
- Preceded by: Solar eclipse of July 12, 2056
- Followed by: Solar eclipse of February 17, 2064

=== Tzolkinex ===
- Preceded by: Solar eclipse of March 20, 2053
- Followed by: Solar eclipse of June 11, 2067

=== Half-Saros ===
- Preceded by: Lunar eclipse of April 26, 2051
- Followed by: Lunar eclipse of May 6, 2069

=== Tritos ===
- Preceded by: Solar eclipse of May 31, 2049
- Followed by: Solar eclipse of March 31, 2071

=== Solar Saros 139 ===
- Preceded by: Solar eclipse of April 20, 2042
- Followed by: Solar eclipse of May 11, 2078

=== Inex ===
- Preceded by: Solar eclipse of May 21, 2031
- Followed by: Solar eclipse of April 10, 2089

=== Triad ===
- Preceded by: Solar eclipse of June 30, 1973
- Followed by: Solar eclipse of March 2, 2147

=== Solar eclipses of 2058–2061 ===
This eclipse is a member of a semester series. An eclipse in a semester series of solar eclipses repeats approximately every 177 days and 4 hours (a semester) at alternating nodes of the Moon's orbit.

The partial solar eclipse on June 21, 2058 occurs in the previous lunar year eclipse set.

Solar eclipse series sets from 2058 to 2061
Ascending node			Descending node		
Saros	Map	Gamma	Saros	Map	Gamma
119	May 22, 2058 Partial	−1.3194	124	November 16, 2058 Partial	1.1224
129	May 11, 2059 Total	−0.508	134	November 5, 2059 Annular	0.4454
139	April 30, 2060 Total	0.2422	144	October 24, 2060 Annular	−0.2625
149	April 20, 2061 Total	0.9578	154	October 13, 2061 Annular	−0.9639

=== Saros 139 ===
This eclipse is a part of Saros series 139, repeating every 18 years, 11 days, and containing 71 events. The series started with a partial solar eclipse on May 17, 1501. It contains hybrid eclipses from August 11, 1627 through December 9, 1825 and total eclipses from December 21, 1843 through March 26, 2601. There are no annular eclipses in this set. The series ends at member 71 as a partial eclipse on July 3, 2763. Its eclipses are tabulated in three columns; every third eclipse in the same column is one exeligmos apart, so they all cast shadows over approximately the same parts of the Earth.

The longest duration of totality will be produced by member 61 at 7 minutes, 29.22 seconds on July 16, 2186. This date is the longest solar eclipse computed between 4000 BC and AD 6000. All eclipses in this series occur at the Moon’s ascending node of orbit.

Series members 18–39 occur between 1801 and 2200:
18	19	20
November 29, 1807	December 9, 1825	December 21, 1843
21	22	23
December 31, 1861	January 11, 1880	January 22, 1898
24	25	26
February 3, 1916	February 14, 1934	February 25, 1952
27	28	29
March 7, 1970	March 18, 1988	March 29, 2006
30	31	32
April 8, 2024	April 20, 2042	April 30, 2060
33	34	35
May 11, 2078	May 22, 2096	June 3, 2114
36	37	38
June 13, 2132	June 25, 2150	July 5, 2168
39
July 16, 2186

=== Metonic series ===
The metonic series repeats eclipses every 19 years (6939.69 days), lasting about 5 cycles. Eclipses occur in nearly the same calendar date. In addition, the octon subseries repeats 1/5 of that or every 3.8 years (1387.94 days). All eclipses in this table occur at the Moon's ascending node.

21 eclipse events between July 13, 2018 and July 12, 2094
July 12–13	April 30–May 1	February 16–17	December 5–6	September 22–23
117	119	121	123	125
July 13, 2018	April 30, 2022	February 17, 2026	December 5, 2029	September 23, 2033
127	129	131	133	135
July 13, 2037	April 30, 2041	February 16, 2045	December 5, 2048	September 22, 2052
137	139	141	143	145
July 12, 2056	April 30, 2060	February 17, 2064	December 6, 2067	September 23, 2071
147	149	151	153	155
July 13, 2075	May 1, 2079	February 16, 2083	December 6, 2086	September 23, 2090
157
July 12, 2094

=== Tritos series ===
This eclipse is a part of a tritos cycle, repeating at alternating nodes every 135 synodic months (≈ 3986.63 days, or 11 years minus 1 month). Their appearance and longitude are irregular due to a lack of synchronization with the anomalistic month (period of perigee), but groupings of 3 tritos cycles (≈ 33 years minus 3 months) come close (≈ 434.044 anomalistic months), so eclipses are similar in these groupings.

Series members between 1801 and 2200
April 14, 1809 (Saros 116)	March 14, 1820 (Saros 117)	February 12, 1831 (Saros 118)	January 11, 1842 (Saros 119)	December 11, 1852 (Saros 120)
November 11, 1863 (Saros 121)	October 10, 1874 (Saros 122)	September 8, 1885 (Saros 123)	August 9, 1896 (Saros 124)	July 10, 1907 (Saros 125)
June 8, 1918 (Saros 126)	May 9, 1929 (Saros 127)	April 7, 1940 (Saros 128)	March 7, 1951 (Saros 129)	February 5, 1962 (Saros 130)
January 4, 1973 (Saros 131)	December 4, 1983 (Saros 132)	November 3, 1994 (Saros 133)	October 3, 2005 (Saros 134)	September 1, 2016 (Saros 135)
August 2, 2027 (Saros 136)	July 2, 2038 (Saros 137)	May 31, 2049 (Saros 138)	April 30, 2060 (Saros 139)	March 31, 2071 (Saros 140)
February 27, 2082 (Saros 141)	January 27, 2093 (Saros 142)	December 29, 2103 (Saros 143)	November 27, 2114 (Saros 144)	October 26, 2125 (Saros 145)
September 26, 2136 (Saros 146)	August 26, 2147 (Saros 147)	July 25, 2158 (Saros 148)	June 25, 2169 (Saros 149)	May 24, 2180 (Saros 150)
April 23, 2191 (Saros 151)

=== Inex series ===
This eclipse is a part of the long period inex cycle, repeating at alternating nodes, every 358 synodic months (≈ 10,571.95 days, or 29 years minus 20 days). Their appearance and longitude are irregular due to a lack of synchronization with the anomalistic month (period of perigee). However, groupings of 3 inex cycles (≈ 87 years minus 2 months) comes close (≈ 1,151.02 anomalistic months), so eclipses are similar in these groupings.

Series members between 1801 and 2200
October 9, 1828 (Saros 131)	September 18, 1857 (Saros 132)	August 29, 1886 (Saros 133)
August 10, 1915 (Saros 134)	July 20, 1944 (Saros 135)	June 30, 1973 (Saros 136)
June 10, 2002 (Saros 137)	May 21, 2031 (Saros 138)	April 30, 2060 (Saros 139)
April 10, 2089 (Saros 140)	March 22, 2118 (Saros 141)	March 2, 2147 (Saros 142)
February 10, 2176 (Saros 143)		
