= Solar eclipse of July 16, 2186 =

Total eclipse

- Total eclipse
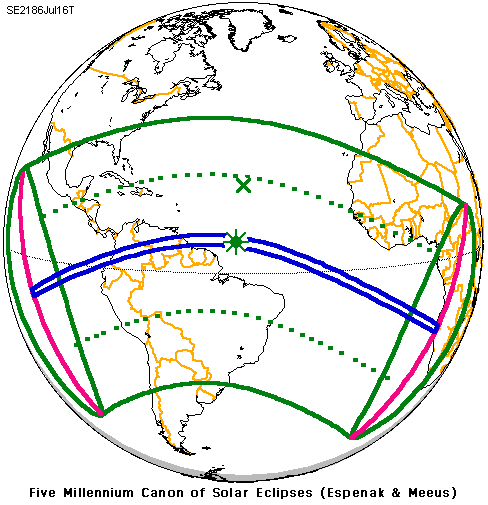
- Map
- Gamma: −0.2396
- Magnitude: 1.0805

Maximum eclipse
- Duration: 449 s (7 min 29 s)
- Coordinates: 7.4°N 46.5°W
- Max. width of band: 267 km (166 mi)

Times (UTC)
- Greatest eclipse: 15:14:54

References
- Saros: 139 (39 of 71)
- Catalog # (SE5000): 9933

A total solar eclipse will occur at the Moon's ascending node of orbit on Sunday, July 16, 2186, with a magnitude of 1.0805. A solar eclipse occurs when the Moon passes between Earth and the Sun, thereby totally or partly obscuring the image of the Sun for a viewer on Earth. A total solar eclipse occurs when the Moon's apparent diameter is larger than the Sun's, blocking all direct sunlight, turning day into darkness. Totality occurs in a narrow path across Earth's surface, with the partial solar eclipse visible over a surrounding region thousands of kilometres wide. Occurring about 3 minutes before perigee (on July 16, 2186, at 15:20 UTC), the Moon's apparent diameter will be near its maximum.

This eclipse will be the longest total solar eclipse out of 6,326 calculated for 10,000 years between 4000 BCE and 6000 CE. The eclipse will pass over the southern Galápagos Islands (with a total eclipse of 4 minutes occurring over the southern tip of Española Island), the northern tip of Ecuador (with a total eclipse of 3 minutes and 26 seconds on Isla Santa Rosa), central Colombia (4 minutes and 50 seconds over Bogota), central Venezuela, and northern Guyana (7 minutes and 4 seconds just north of Anna Regina).

== Extreme duration ==
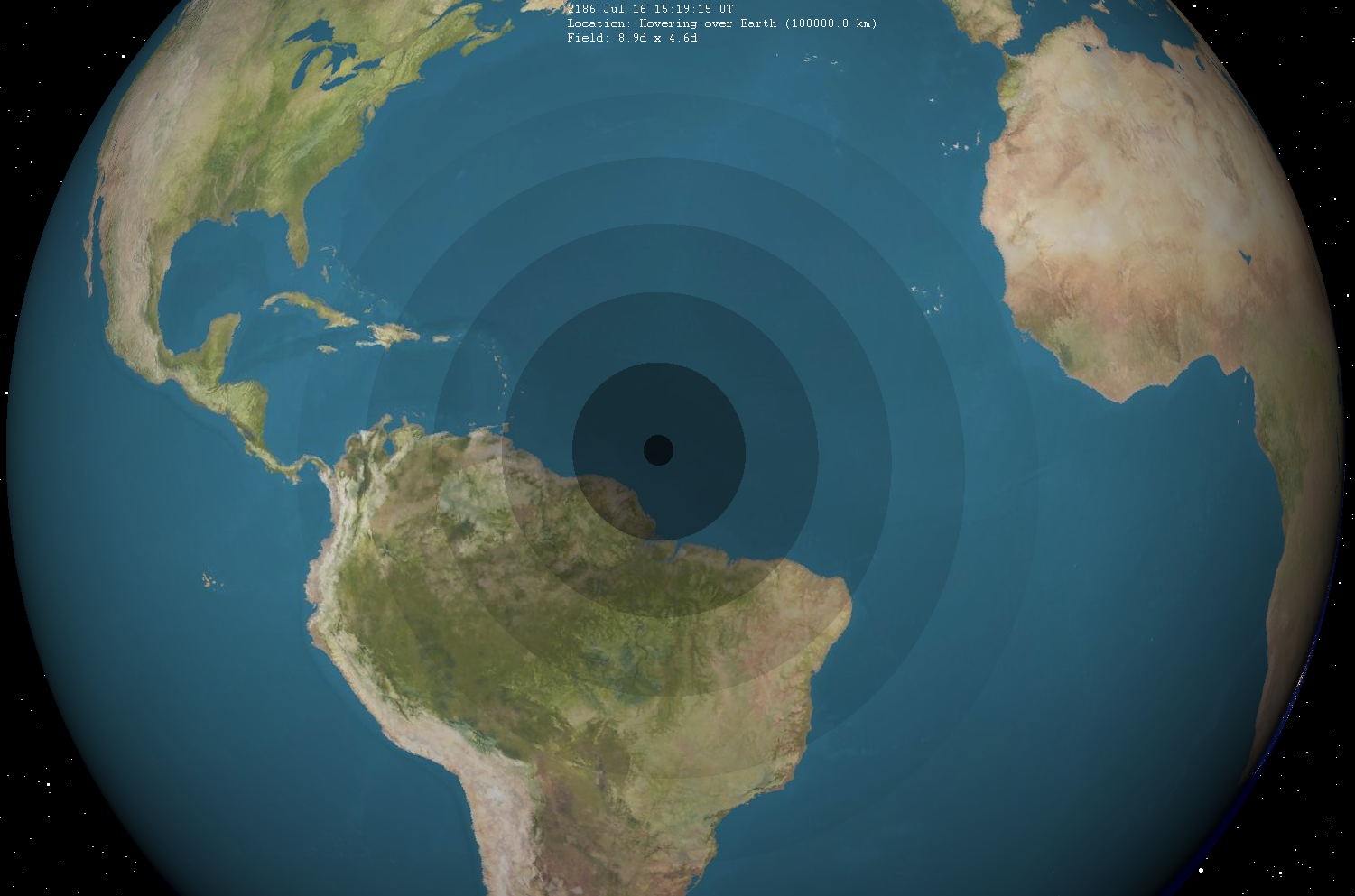
267 km diameter shadow at greatest eclipse

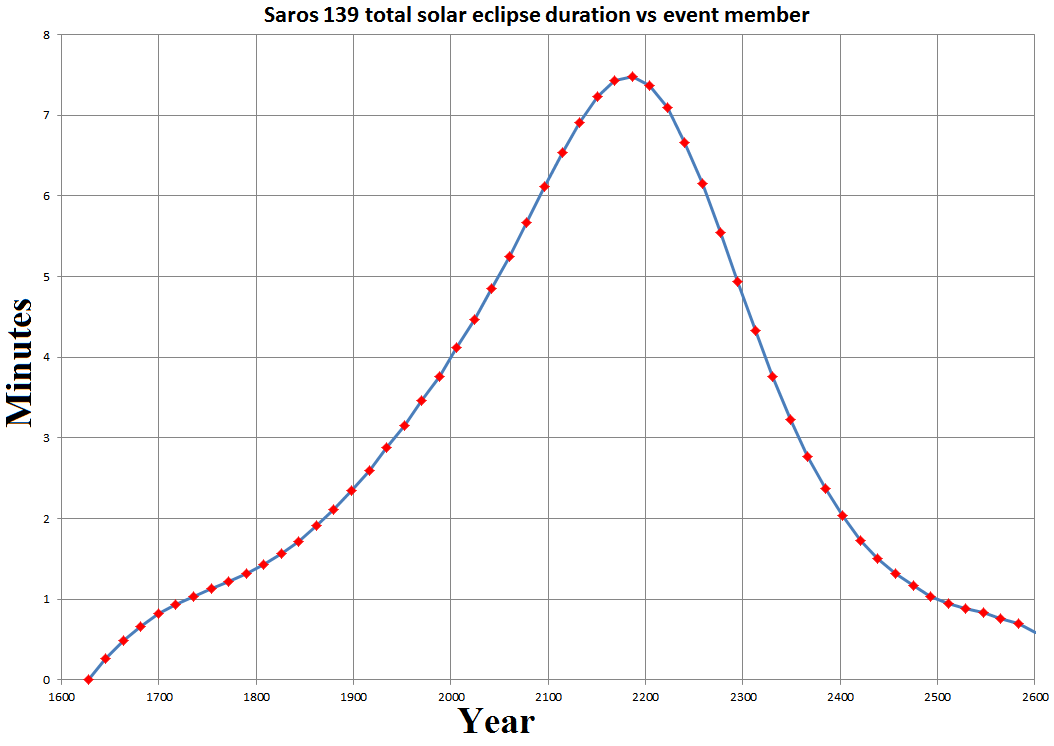
Saros 139 member durations

This will be the longest total solar eclipse between 4000 BCE and at least CE 6000 (10,000 years), lasting a maximum of 7 minutes, 29.22 seconds. The factors that will make this such a long eclipse are:

- The Earth being very near aphelion (furthest away from the Sun in its elliptical orbit, making its angular diameter nearly as small as possible). This occurs around July 6th.
- The Moon being almost exactly at perigee (making its angular diameter as large as possible). The moment of greatest eclipse will be just 50 minutes after perigee.
- The midpoint of the eclipse being very close to the Earth's equator, where the Earth's rotational velocity is greatest. (The affects the distance the shadow travels on the ground, but not the time duration.)
- The midpoint of the eclipse being near the subsolar point (the part of the Earth closest to the Sun, and therefore also closest to the Moon during an eclipse).
- The vector of the eclipse path at the midpoint of the eclipse aligning with the vector of the Earth's rotation (i.e. not diagonal but due east). For solar eclipses at the ascending node (odd numbered saros) this occurs approximately 12 days after the summer solstice.

The longest historical total eclipse lasted 7 minutes 27.54 seconds on June 15, 743 BC. The longest eclipse theoretically possible is 7 minutes and 32 seconds.

== Responses ==
Michael Zeiler, an eclipse cartographer, told Live Science the 2186 eclipse "will last up to an astonishing 7 minutes and 29 seconds, very close to the theoretical limit of 7 and a half minutes."

Vice magazine, musing what the "wolves feasting on the bones" of a possibly then-extinct human civilization would think, suggested the longest solar eclipse in 12,000 years would be "worth a howl".

IFL Science noted that the 22nd century will be a "golden era for eclipse chasers", with the 2186 eclipse overshadowing two other 7+ minute events in 2150 and 2168. No total solar eclipse of the 21st century will exceed 7 minutes.

In March 2023, the art and design magazine IGNANT interviewed the Berlin-based photographer Matthias Ledinger about his project AD2186. Using primarily black and white media, Ledinger "depicts the complex awe-sensations and emotions generated by the solar eclipse" similar to that of the Overview effect.

== Eclipse details ==
Shown below are two tables displaying details about this particular solar eclipse. The first table outlines times at which the Moon's penumbra or umbra attains the specific parameter, and the second table describes various other parameters pertaining to this eclipse.

July 16, 2186 Solar Eclipse Times
Event	Time (UTC)
First Penumbral External Contact	2186 July 16 at 12:39:43.0 UTC
First Umbral External Contact	2186 July 16 at 13:33:32.0 UTC
First Central Line	2186 July 16 at 13:35:13.1 UTC
First Umbral Internal Contact	2186 July 16 at 13:36:54.2 UTC
First Penumbral Internal Contact	2186 July 16 at 14:33:28.5 UTC
Ecliptic Conjunction	2186 July 16 at 15:12:28.2 UTC
Greatest Duration	2186 July 16 at 15:13:17.7 UTC
Greatest Eclipse	2186 July 16 at 15:14:54.1 UTC
Equatorial Conjunction	2186 July 16 at 15:16:50.6 UTC
Last Penumbral Internal Contact	2186 July 16 at 15:56:16.7 UTC
Last Umbral Internal Contact	2186 July 16 at 16:52:52.6 UTC
Last Central Line	2186 July 16 at 16:54:33.7 UTC
Last Umbral External Contact	2186 July 16 at 16:56:14.8 UTC
Last Penumbral External Contact	2186 July 16 at 17:50:04.4 UTC

July 16, 2186 Solar Eclipse Parameters
Parameter	Value
Eclipse Magnitude	1.08047
Eclipse Obscuration	1.16741
Gamma	−0.23964
Sun Right Ascension	07h45m22.8s
Sun Declination	+21°12'31.6"
Sun Semi-Diameter	15'44.1"
Sun Equatorial Horizontal Parallax	08.7"
Moon Right Ascension	07h45m17.9s
Moon Declination	+20°57'54.1"
Moon Semi-Diameter	16'43.2"
Moon Equatorial Horizontal Parallax	1°01'21.8"
ΔT	246.3 s

== Eclipse season ==
This eclipse is part of an eclipse season, a period, roughly every six months, when eclipses occur. Only two (or occasionally three) eclipse seasons occur each year, and each season lasts about 35 days and repeats just short of six months (173 days) later; thus two full eclipse seasons always occur each year. Either two or three eclipses happen each eclipse season. In the sequence below, each eclipse is separated by a fortnight.

Eclipse season of July 2186
July 16 Ascending node (new moon)	July 31 Descending node (full moon)
Total solar eclipse Solar Saros 139	Penumbral lunar eclipse Lunar Saros 151

== Related eclipses ==
=== Eclipses in 2186 ===
- An annular solar eclipse on January 20.
- A partial lunar eclipse on February 4.
- A total solar eclipse on July 16.
- A penumbral lunar eclipse on July 31.
- A penumbral lunar eclipse on December 26.

=== Metonic ===
- Preceded by: Solar eclipse of September 27, 2182
- Followed by: Solar eclipse of May 4, 2190

=== Tzolkinex ===
- Preceded by: Solar eclipse of June 5, 2179
- Followed by: Solar eclipse of August 26, 2193

=== Half-Saros ===
- Preceded by: Lunar eclipse of July 11, 2177
- Followed by: Lunar eclipse of July 22, 2195

=== Tritos ===
- Preceded by: Solar eclipse of August 16, 2175
- Followed by: Solar eclipse of June 15, 2197

=== Solar Saros 139 ===
- Preceded by: Solar eclipse of July 5, 2168
- Followed by: Solar eclipse of July 27, 2204

=== Inex ===
- Preceded by: Solar eclipse of August 5, 2157
- Followed by: Solar eclipse of June 28, 2215

=== Triad ===
- Preceded by: Solar eclipse of September 14, 2099
- Followed by: Solar eclipse of May 17, 2273

=== Solar eclipses of 2185–2188 ===
This eclipse is a member of a semester series. An eclipse in a semester series of solar eclipses repeats approximately every 177 days and 4 hours (a semester) at alternating nodes of the Moon's orbit.

The partial solar eclipses on May 26, 2188 and November 18, 2188 occur in the next lunar year eclipse set.

Solar eclipse series sets from 2185 to 2188
Descending node			Ascending node		
Saros	Map	Gamma	Saros	Map	Gamma
124	January 31, 2185 Partial	1.1991	129	July 26, 2185 Total	−0.9967
134	January 20, 2186 Annular	0.5426	139	July 16, 2186 Total	−0.2396
144	January 9, 2187 Annular	−0.1365	149	July 6, 2187 Total	0.5109
154	December 29, 2187 Annular	−0.8126	159	June 24, 2188 Partial	1.3252
164	December 18, 2188 Partial	−1.4420			

=== Saros 139 ===
This eclipse is a part of Saros series 139, repeating every 18 years, 11 days, and containing 71 events. The series started with a partial solar eclipse on May 17, 1501. It contains hybrid eclipses from August 11, 1627 through December 9, 1825 and total eclipses from December 21, 1843 through March 26, 2601. There are no annular eclipses in this set. The series ends at member 71 as a partial eclipse on July 3, 2763. Its eclipses are tabulated in three columns; every third eclipse in the same column is one exeligmos apart, so they all cast shadows over approximately the same parts of the Earth.

The longest duration of totality will be produced by member 61 at 7 minutes, 29.22 seconds on July 16, 2186. This date is the longest solar eclipse computed between 4000 BC and AD 6000. All eclipses in this series occur at the Moon’s ascending node of orbit.

Series members 18–39 occur between 1801 and 2200:
18	19	20
November 29, 1807	December 9, 1825	December 21, 1843
21	22	23
December 31, 1861	January 11, 1880	January 22, 1898
24	25	26
February 3, 1916	February 14, 1934	February 25, 1952
27	28	29
March 7, 1970	March 18, 1988	March 29, 2006
30	31	32
April 8, 2024	April 20, 2042	April 30, 2060
33	34	35
May 11, 2078	May 22, 2096	June 3, 2114
36	37	38
June 13, 2132	June 25, 2150	July 5, 2168
39
July 16, 2186

=== Metonic series ===
The metonic series repeats eclipses every 19 years (6939.69 days), lasting about 5 cycles. Eclipses occur in nearly the same calendar date. In addition, the octon subseries repeats 1/5 of that or every 3.8 years (1387.94 days). All eclipses in this table occur at the Moon's descending node.

13 eclipse events between May 4, 2152 and December 9, 2197
May 4–5	February 21	December 9	September 27–28	July 16
121	123	125	127	129
May 4, 2152	February 21, 2156	December 9, 2159	September 28, 2163	July 16, 2167
131	133	135	137	139
May 5, 2171	February 21, 2175	December 9, 2178	September 27, 2182	July 16, 2186
141	143	145		
May 4, 2190	February 21, 2194	December 9, 2197		

=== Tritos series ===
This eclipse is a part of a tritos cycle, repeating at alternating nodes every 135 synodic months (≈ 3986.63 days, or 11 years minus 1 month). Their appearance and longitude are irregular due to a lack of synchronization with the anomalistic month (period of perigee), but groupings of 3 tritos cycles (≈ 33 years minus 3 months) come close (≈ 434.044 anomalistic months), so eclipses are similar in these groupings.

Series members between 1837 and 2200
April 5, 1837 (Saros 107)	March 5, 1848 (Saros 108)	February 3, 1859 (Saros 109)		December 2, 1880 (Saros 111)
		August 31, 1913 (Saros 114)	July 31, 1924 (Saros 115)	June 30, 1935 (Saros 116)
May 30, 1946 (Saros 117)	April 30, 1957 (Saros 118)	March 28, 1968 (Saros 119)	February 26, 1979 (Saros 120)	January 26, 1990 (Saros 121)
December 25, 2000 (Saros 122)	November 25, 2011 (Saros 123)	October 25, 2022 (Saros 124)	September 23, 2033 (Saros 125)	August 23, 2044 (Saros 126)
July 24, 2055 (Saros 127)	June 22, 2066 (Saros 128)	May 22, 2077 (Saros 129)	April 21, 2088 (Saros 130)	March 21, 2099 (Saros 131)
February 18, 2110 (Saros 132)	January 19, 2121 (Saros 133)	December 19, 2131 (Saros 134)	November 17, 2142 (Saros 135)	October 17, 2153 (Saros 136)
September 16, 2164 (Saros 137)	August 16, 2175 (Saros 138)	July 16, 2186 (Saros 139)	June 15, 2197 (Saros 140)	

=== Inex series ===
This eclipse is a part of the long period inex cycle, repeating at alternating nodes, every 358 synodic months (≈ 10,571.95 days, or 29 years minus 20 days). Their appearance and longitude are irregular due to a lack of synchronization with the anomalistic month (period of perigee). However, groupings of 3 inex cycles (≈ 87 years minus 2 months) comes close (≈ 1,151.02 anomalistic months), so eclipses are similar in these groupings.

Series members between 1801 and 2200
April 4, 1810 (Saros 126)	March 15, 1839 (Saros 127)	February 23, 1868 (Saros 128)
February 1, 1897 (Saros 129)	January 14, 1926 (Saros 130)	December 25, 1954 (Saros 131)
December 4, 1983 (Saros 132)	November 13, 2012 (Saros 133)	October 25, 2041 (Saros 134)
October 4, 2070 (Saros 135)	September 14, 2099 (Saros 136)	August 25, 2128 (Saros 137)
August 5, 2157 (Saros 138)	July 16, 2186 (Saros 139)	
