= List of solar eclipses in the 22nd century =

During the 22nd century, there will be 235 solar eclipses of which 79 will be partial, 87 will be annular, 65 will be total and 4 will be hybrids between total and annular eclipses. Of these, five annular eclipses will be non-central, in the sense that the very center (axis) of the Moon's shadow will miss the Earth (for more information see gamma). In the 22nd century, the greatest number of eclipses in one year is four, in 11 different years: 2112, 2134, 2141, 2152, 2159, 2170, 2177, 2181, 2188, 2195, and 2199. The predictions given here are by Fred Espenak of NASA's Goddard Space Flight Center.

The longest measured duration in which the Moon completely covered the Sun, known as totality, will be during the solar eclipse of July 16, 2186. This total solar eclipse will have a maximum duration of 7 minutes and 29.22 seconds. This will be the longest total solar eclipse between 4000 BCE and at least CE 6000 (10,000 years). The longest possible duration of a total solar eclipse is 7 minutes and 32 seconds. The longest annular solar eclipse of the 22nd century will take place on January 10, 2168, with a duration of 10 minutes and 55 seconds. The maximum possible duration is 12 minutes and 29 seconds.^{[a]}

The table contains the date and time of the greatest eclipse (in dynamical time), which in this case is the time when the axis of the Moon's shadow cone passes closest to the centre of Earth; this is in (Ephemeris Time). The number of the saros series that the eclipse belongs to is given, followed by the type of the eclipse (either total, annular, partial or hybrid), the gamma of the eclipse (how centrally the shadow of the Moon strikes the Earth), and the magnitude of the eclipse (the fraction of the Sun's diameter obscured by the Moon). For total and annular eclipses, the duration of the eclipse is given, as well as the location of the greatest eclipse (the point of maximum eclipse) and the path width of the total or annular eclipse. The geographical areas from which the eclipse can be seen are listed along with a chart illustrating each eclipse's respective path.

== Longest and shortest ==
Extrema Type	Date	Duration	Magnitude
Longest Annular Solar Eclipse	2168 January 10	10m 55s	0.923
Shortest Annular Solar Eclipse	2191 April 23	00m 02.87s	0.9993
Longest Total Solar Eclipse	2186 July 16	07m 29s	-
Shortest Total Solar Eclipse	2200 April 14	01m 23s	-
Longest Hybrid Solar Eclipse	2172 October 17	01m 34s	-
Shortest Hybrid Solar Eclipse	2164 March 22	00m 29s	-
Largest Partial Solar Eclipse	2109 August 26	-	0.96698
Smallest Partial Solar Eclipse	2112 June 24	-	0.02818

== Eclipses ==
Date	Time of greatest eclipse (Terrestrial Time)	Saros	Type	Gamma	Magnitude	Central duration (min:s)	Location	Path width		Geographical area	Chart	Ref(s)
Date	Time of greatest eclipse (Terrestrial Time)	Saros	Type	Gamma	Magnitude	Central duration (min:s)	Location	km	mi	Geographical area	Chart	Ref(s)
February 28, 2101	02:16:26	151	Annular	0.9964	0.9609	2:44	60.5°N 80.0°E	—		Annular: Central Siberia, Kazakhstan		^{[a]}
August 24, 2101	19:37:03	156	Partial	−1.1392	0.7337	—	61.6°S 178.2°E	—				^{[a]}
January 19, 2102	02:21:30	123	Partial	−1.0741	0.8682	—	63.5°S 73.6°W	—				^{[a]}
July 15, 2102	08:15:14	128	Annular	0.9080	0.9398	4:14	75.9°N 134.2°E	539	335	Annular: Northern Canada, Western Greenland, Russian Far East		^{[a]}
January 8, 2103	18:04:21	133	Total	−0.4140	1.0381	2:57	46.1°S 80.8°W	140	87	Total: Chile, Argentina, Uruguay, Southern Brazil		^{[a]}
July 4, 2103	10:01:48	138	Annular	0.1285	0.9734	2:57	30.3°N 33.2°E	96	60	Annular: Western Sahara, Morocco, Algeria, Tunisia, Libya, Egypt, Israel, Jordan, Saudi Arabia, Oman, Maldives		^{[a]}
December 29, 2103	07:13:18	143	Annular	0.2747	0.9936	0:43	7.5°S 70.5°E	23	14	Annular: Cameroon, Central African Republic, Democratic Republic of the Congo, Uganda, Rwanda, Tanzania, Indonesia, Thailand, Cambodia, Vietnam		^{[a]}
June 22, 2104	18:16:21	148	Total	−0.6438	1.0231	2:26	16.6°S 96.8°W	103	64	Total: Chile, Argentina		^{[a]}
December 17, 2104	13:48:27	153	Annular	1.0120	0.9381	—	66.4°N 36.6°W	—		Annular: Greenland		^{[a]}
May 14, 2105	01:52:06	120	Partial	1.1708	0.6921	—	69.4°N 1.4°W	—				^{[a]}
June 12, 2105	08:58:11	158	Partial	−1.3489	0.3483	—	66.8°S 41.9°E	—				^{[a]}
November 6, 2105	19:23:02	125	Partial	−1.3168	0.4217	—	70.2°S 102.7°E	—				^{[a]}
May 3, 2106	18:19:20	130	Total	0.4681	1.0472	3:47	43.1°N 102.3°W	177	110	Total: Hawaii, California, Nevada, Utah, Wyoming, Colorado, Nebraska, South Dakota, Minnesota, Wisconsin, Michigan, Canada, Maine		^{[a]}
October 26, 2106	22:37:40	135	Annular	−0.5671	0.9725	2:32	45.9°S 174.1°W	119	74	Annular: Australia, New Zealand		^{[a]}
April 23, 2107	06:18:41	140	Annular	−0.2829	0.9918	0:56	3.6°S 89.9°E	30	19	Annular: South Africa, Southern Madagascar, Indonesia, Singapore, Malaysia		^{[a]}
October 16, 2107	09:18:27	145	Total	0.1778	1.0332	3:16	1.1°N 40.6°E	114	71	Total: Western Sahara, Mauritania, Mali, Algeria, Niger, Chad, Sudan, South Sudan, Kenya, Somalia, Seychelles		^{[a]}
April 11, 2108	10:55:37	150	Partial	−1.0573	0.8620	—	71.7°S 80.5°E	—				^{[a]}
October 4–5, 2108	01:01:20	155	Total	0.8722	1.0551	3:50	52.5°N 172.0°W	371	231	Total: Russian Far East, Aleutian Islands		^{[a]}
March 1, 2109	17:45:53	122	Partial	1.1972	0.6238	—	71.8°N 149.1°W	—				^{[a]}
August 26, 2109	07:57:26	127	Partial	−1.0178	0.9670	—	71.4°S 5.1°E	—				^{[a]}
February 18, 2110	23:31:35	132	Annular	0.4438	0.9888	1:12	14.1°N 175.3°W	44	27	Annular: Micronesia, Marshall Islands, California, Nevada, Utah		^{[a]}
August 15, 2110	16:50:45	137	Annular	−0.2819	0.9746	3:07	2.0°S 74.3°W	94	58	Annular: Ecuador, Peru, Brazil		^{[a]}
February 8, 2111	12:05:33	142	Total	−0.2650	1.0374	3:17	30.2°S 6.8°E	130	81	Total: Chile, Argentina, Uruguay, Southern Brazil, Namibia, Botswana, Zimbabwe, Mozambique, Malawi, Comoros		^{[a]}
August 4, 2111	19:00:22	147	Annular	0.4867	0.9455	5:42	46.0°N 95.3°W	230	140	Annular: Canada, Washington, Idaho, Montana, North Dakota, South Dakota, Minnesota, Wisconsin, Iowa, Illinois, Michigan, Indiana, Ohio, Pennsylvania, West Virginia, Maryland, Virginia, Delaware, Bermuda		^{[a]}
January 29, 2112	03:49:52	152	Total	−0.9292	1.0346	1:56	80.6°S 163.8°W	322	200	Total: Antarctica		^{[a]}
June 24, 2112	07:09:53	119	Partial	−1.5356	0.0282	—	66.3°S 84.4°E	—				^{[a]}
July 23, 2112	19:58:32	157	Partial	1.2284	0.5725	—	69.0°N 43.1°E	—				^{[a]}
December 19, 2112	04:33:16	124	Partial	1.1648	0.6858	—	65.7°N 128.4°E	—				^{[a]}
June 13, 2113	17:26:00	129	Total	−0.7097	1.0367	3:36	21.7°S 73.8°W	174	108	Total: Chile, Bolivia, Paraguay, Brazil		^{[a]}
December 8, 2113	09:03:27	134	Annular	0.5049	0.9296	9:35	7.1°N 48.9°E	304	189	Annular: Spain, Algeria, Tunisia, Libya, Egypt, Sudan, Eritrea, Ethiopia, Djibouti, Somalia, India, Sri Lanka, Andaman and Nicobar Islands, Myanmar, Thailand		^{[a]}
June 3, 2114	09:14:09	139	Total	0.0525	1.0766	6:32	25.4°N 41.3°E	248	154	Total: Nigeria, Cameroon, Chad, Sudan, Egypt, Saudi Arabia, Kuwait, Iran, Afghanistan, Pakistan, India, Bangladesh, Myanmar, Thailand, Laos, Vietnam		^{[a]}
November 27, 2114	08:24:15	144	Annular	−0.1815	0.9223	9:15	31.3°S 48.4°E	298	185	Annular: Liberia, Côte d'Ivoire, São Tomé and Príncipe, Gabon, Republic of the Congo, Democratic Republic of the Congo, Angola, Zambia, Zimbabwe, Mozambique, Australia		^{[a]}
May 23–24, 2115	02:13:56	149	Total	0.7912	1.0557	3:24	67.8°N 109.4°E	301	187	Total: Iran, Afghanistan, Turkmenistan, Uzbekistan, Tajikistan, Kyrgyzstan, Kazakhstan, Siberia, Northern Canada		^{[a]}
November 16, 2115	09:58:55	154	Annular	−0.8664	0.9503	3:32	68.7°S 27.8°W	365	227	Annular: Argentina, Antarctica		^{[a]}
April 13, 2116	03:36:55	121	Partial	−1.1487	0.7138	—	61.3°S 160.2°W	—				^{[a]}
October 6, 2116	08:31:51	126	Partial	1.1589	0.7105	—	61.2°N 130.4°E	—				^{[a]}
November 4, 2116	18:50:09	164	Partial	−1.5103	0.0613	—	62.3°S 132.3°E	—				^{[a]}
April 2, 2117	06:15:20	131	Annular	−0.4459	0.9333	7:30	18.4°S 101.1°E	274	170	Annular: Indonesia		^{[a]}
September 25–26, 2117	00:55:42	136	Total	0.4442	1.0645	5:03	21.9°N 178.4°E	233	145	Total: Russian Far East, Northern China, Kiribati		^{[a]}
March 22, 2118	06:00:55	141	Annular	0.2719	0.9382	6:50	14.3°N 84.7°E	237	147	Annular: Zambia, Malawi, Mozambique, Comoros, Northern Madagascar, Maldives, Sri Lanka, Bangladesh, India, Myanmar, China, North Korea, Russian Far East, Japan		^{[a]}
September 15, 2118	16:28:26	146	Total	−0.2823	1.0349	3:04	11.5°S 75.2°W	122	76	Total: Peru, Chile, Bolivia, Argentina, Uruguay, Southern Brazil		^{[a]}
March 11, 2119	10:19:19	151	Annular	0.9693	0.9694	2:13	56.7°N 29.2°W	451	280	Annular: Greenland		^{[a]}
September 5, 2119	02:44:27	156	Partial	−1.0766	0.8431	—	61.2°S 62.8°E	—				^{[a]}
January 30, 2120	11:09:56	123	Partial	−1.0792	0.8594	—	62.7°S 145.3°E	—				^{[a]}
July 25, 2120	14:40:02	128	Annular	0.9948	0.9343	4:00	66.0°N 90.4°E	—		Annular: Siberia		^{[a]}
January 19, 2121	02:54:15	133	Total	−0.4190	1.0371	2:52	43.9°S 150.1°E	137	85	Total: Tonga		^{[a]}
July 14, 2121	16:42:39	138	Annular	0.2125	0.9758	2:32	33.6°N 64.3°W	88	55	Annular: California, Nevada, Arizona, New Mexico, Colorado, Kansas, Missouri, Illinois, Indiana, Kentucky, Ohio, West Virginia, Virginia		^{[a]}
January 8, 2122	15:48:51	143	Annular	0.2713	0.9907	1:02	6.9°S 58.2°W	34	21	Annular: Peru, Brazil, Cape Verde, Mauritania, Western Sahara, Algeria		^{[a]}
July 3–4, 2122	01:25:31	148	Total	−0.5649	1.0280	2:56	11.0°S 154.7°E	114	71	Total: Papua New Guinea, Vanuatu		^{[a]}
December 28, 2122	22:00:56	153	Annular	1.0072	0.9450	—	65.3°N 169.8°W	—		Annular: Alaska		^{[a]}
May 25, 2123	09:33:27	120	Partial	1.2325	0.5729	—	68.5°N 128.2°W	—				^{[a]}
June 23, 2123	16:26:12	158	Partial	−1.2763	0.4882	—	65.8°S 80.3°W	—				^{[a]}
November 18, 2123	03:07:26	125	Partial	−1.3389	0.3848	—	69.3°S 25.5°W	—				^{[a]}
May 13–14, 2124	01:59:10	130	Total	0.5286	1.0464	3:34	50.3°N 143.2°E	182	113	Total: India, Nepal, Bhutan, China, Russian Far East, Aleutian Islands		^{[a]}
November 6, 2124	06:36:34	135	Annular	−0.5921	0.9724	2:26	51.6°S 66.8°E	123	76	Annular: Namibia, South Africa, Crozet Islands, Heard Island and McDonald Islands		^{[a]}
May 3, 2125	13:42:33	140	Annular	−0.2263	0.9915	0:59	3.0°N 22.6°W	31	19	Annular: Chile, Bolivia, Brazil, Liberia, Côte d'Ivoire, Ghaba, Togo, Benin, Nigeria, Cameroon, Central African Republic, Republic of the Congo, Democratic Republic of the Congo, Uganda, Kenya		^{[a]}
October 26, 2125	17:30:49	145	Total	0.1461	1.0329	3:15	4.5°S 83.6°W	112	70	Total: Peru, Brazil, Bolivia		^{[a]}
April 22, 2126	18:04:22	150	Annular	−1.0051	0.9514	—	71.1°S 40.0°W	—		Annular: Antarctica		^{[a]}
October 16, 2126	09:12:51	155	Total	0.8345	1.0534	4:00	45.3°N 58.6°E	319	198	Total: Norway, Sweden, Finland, Estonia, Russia, Kazakhstan, Uzbekistan, Tajikistan, Kyrgyzstan, China		^{[a]}
March 12–13, 2127	01:32:02	122	Partial	1.2208	0.5841	—	72.1°N 80.4°E	—				^{[a]}
September 6, 2127	15:24:17	127	Partial	−1.0822	0.8458	—	71.9°S 120.1°W	—				^{[a]}
March 1, 2128	07:48:32	132	Annular	0.4596	0.9940	0:37	18.9°N 59.1°E	24	15	Annular: Benin, Nigeria, Cameroon, Chad, Central African Republic, South Sudan, Sudan, Ethiopia, Djibouti, Yemen, Oman, Pakistan, India, China		^{[a]}
August 25, 2128	23:44:34	137	Annular	−0.3562	0.9694	3:41	9.8°S 180.0°E	117	73	Annular: Indonesia, Papua New Guinea		^{[a]}
February 18, 2129	20:44:37	142	Total	−0.2526	1.0411	3:38	25.6°S 122.5°W	142	88	Total: Peru, Ecuador, Colombia, Brazil		^{[a]}
August 14–15, 2129	01:33:05	147	Annular	0.4055	0.9442	6:15	37.4°N 165.8°E	225	140	Annular: China, North Korea, Japan		^{[a]}
February 8, 2130	12:35:23	152	Total	−0.9212	1.0356	2:03	75.9°S 51.8°E	313	194	Total: Antarctica		^{[a]}
August 4, 2130	02:38:44	157	Partial	1.1461	0.7158	—	69.9°N 68.7°W	—				^{[a]}
December 30, 2130	13:01:34	124	Partial	1.1730	0.6708	—	66.8°N 8.8°W	—				^{[a]}
June 24–25, 2131	00:43:16	129	Total	−0.7813	1.0393	3:43	28.1°S 174.7°E	211	131	Total: Southeastern Australia, Norfolk Island		^{[a]}
December 19, 2131	17:06:51	134	Annular	0.5165	0.9267	10:14	7.6°N 72.8°W	321	199	Annular: Southwestern California, Mexico, Guatemala, Belize, El Salvador, Honduras, Nicaragua, Costa Rica, Panama, Colombia, Venezuela, Guyana		^{[a]}
June 13, 2132	16:46:24	139	Total	−0.0186	1.0788	6:55	22.3°N 70.1°W	255	158	Total: Guatemala, Belize, El Salvador, Honduras, Cayman Islands, Cuba, Turks and Caicos Islands, Cape Verde, Gambia, Senegal, Guinea-Bissau, Guinea, Sierra Leone, Côte d'Ivoire		^{[a]}
December 7, 2132	16:18:43	144	Annular	−0.1661	0.9215	9:33	32.2°S 67.9°W	301	187	Annular: Chile, Argentina, Uruguay		^{[a]}
June 3, 2133	09:45:16	149	Total	0.7247	1.0567	3:36	66.6°N 10.7°E	272	169	Total: Northern Scotland, Norway, Sweden, Finland, Russia		^{[a]}
November 26, 2133	18:05:55	154	Annular	−0.8473	0.9513	3:27	72.0°S 143.5°W	337	209	Annular: New Zealand, Antarctica		^{[a]}
April 24, 2134	10:59:59	121	Partial	−1.2052	0.6147	—	61.8°S 80.5°E	—				^{[a]}
May 23, 2134	23:01:18	159	Partial	1.5285	0.0308	—	63.7°N 55.3°E	—				^{[a]}
October 17, 2134	16:40:42	126	Partial	1.1931	0.6458	—	61.5°N 0.4°W	—				^{[a]}
November 16, 2134	03:12:08	164	Partial	−1.4857	0.1060	—	63.0°S 2.1°W	—				^{[a]}
April 13, 2135	13:27:05	131	Annular	−0.4973	0.9349	7:30	17.6°S 6.5°W	274	170	Annular: Southern Chile, Southern Argentina, Gabon, Republic of the Congo, Democratic Republic of the Congo, Rwanda, Burundi, Uganda, Tanzania, Kenya, Somalia		^{[a]}
October 7, 2135	09:00:03	136	Total	0.4884	1.0603	4:50	20.3°N 57.6°E	224	139	Total: United Kingdom, Netherlands, Germany, Czech Republic, Poland, Slovakia, Hungary, Romania, Ukraine, Moldova, Turkey, Syria, Iraq, Iran, Kuwait, Saudi Arabia, Bahrain, Qatar, United Arab Emirates, Oman, Maldives, Indonesia		^{[a]}
April 1, 2136	13:26:19	141	Annular	0.2295	0.9430	6:14	16.5°N 26.0°W	216	134	Annular: Peru, Bolivia, Brazil, Cape Verde, Canary Islands, Morocco, Spain, Italy, Bosnia and Herzegovina, Montenegro, Albania, Kosovo, Serbia, Macedonia, Greece, Bulgaria, Turkey, Georgia, Southern Russia, Armenia		^{[a]}
September 25–26, 2136	00:12:14	146	Total	−0.2309	1.0292	2:34	13.0°S 169.4°E	101	63	Total: Philippines, Solomon Islands		^{[a]}
March 21, 2137	18:16:38	151	Annular	0.9369	0.9769	1:40	55.6°N 144.8°W	233	145	Annular: Alaska		^{[a]}
September 15, 2137	09:56:34	156	Partial	−1.0184	0.9436	—	61.0°S 53.8°W	—				^{[a]}
February 9, 2138	19:55:23	123	Partial	−1.0872	0.8453	—	62.1°S 5.1°E	—				^{[a]}
August 5, 2138	21:08:57	128	Partial	1.0781	0.8285	—	62.4°N 9.2°W	—				^{[a]}
January 30, 2139	11:42:25	133	Total	−0.4255	1.0364	2:49	41.0°S 20.7°E	135	84	Total: Chile, Argentina, Madagascar		^{[a]}
July 25, 2139	23:26:33	138	Annular	0.2946	0.9778	2:13	35.8°N 161.9°W	83	52	Annular: China, North Korea, South Korea, Japan		^{[a]}
January 19–20, 2140	00:23:11	143	Annular	0.2676	0.9882	1:17	5.5°S 173.4°E	43	27	Annular: Indonesia, Solomon Islands, Kiribati, Hawaii		^{[a]}
July 14, 2140	08:36:11	148	Total	−0.4861	1.0322	3:18	6.7°S 46.5°E	124	77	Total: Angola, Democratic Republic of the Congo, Rwanda, Burundi, Tanzania, Kenya		^{[a]}
January 8, 2141	06:12:38	153	Annular	1.0024	0.9522	—	64.3°N 57.7°E	—		Annular: Russia		^{[a]}
June 4, 2141	17:09:59	120	Partial	1.2981	0.4458	—	67.5°N 106.7°E	—				^{[a]}
July 3, 2141	23:53:38	158	Partial	−1.2029	0.6305	—	64.9°S 158.0°E	—				^{[a]}
November 28, 2141	10:59:33	125	Partial	−1.3552	0.3577	—	68.2°S 155.0°W	—				^{[a]}
May 25, 2142	09:32:37	130	Total	0.5937	1.0449	3:17	57.4°N 31.9°E	187	116	Total: France, United Kingdom, Belgium, Netherlands, Germany, Poland, Lithuania, Latvia, Estonia, Russia, Mongolia, China		^{[a]}
November 17, 2142	14:43:08	135	Annular	−0.6117	0.9727	2:19	56.4°S 52.4°W	124	77	Annular: Chile, Argentina		^{[a]}
May 14, 2143	20:58:14	140	Annular	−0.1638	0.9908	1:05	9.4°N 132.7°W	33	21	Annular: Tokelau, Ecuador, Colombia, Peru		^{[a]}
November 6–7, 2143	01:51:16	145	Total	0.1206	1.0326	3:14	9.4°S 150.8°E	111	69	Total: Myanmar, Thailand, Cambodia, Vietnam, Indonesia, Papua New Guinea, Solomon Islands		^{[a]}
May 2–3, 2144	01:02:06	150	Annular	−0.9441	0.9363	6:09	53.6°S 175.9°W	727	452	Annular: Antarctica		^{[a]}
October 26, 2144	17:32:40	155	Total	0.8037	1.0512	4:05	39.2°N 71.2°W	284	176	Total: Canada, Minnesota, Wisconsin, Michigan, Ohio, Pennsylvania, New York, Connecticut, New Jersey, Maryland, Delaware, Azores		^{[a]}
March 23, 2145	09:09:38	122	Partial	1.2519	0.5311	—	72.1°N 48.0°W	—				^{[a]}
September 16, 2145	22:57:10	127	Partial	−1.1406	0.7368	—	72.1°S 112.8°E	—				^{[a]}
October 16, 2145	09:11:28	165	Partial	1.5190	0.0359	—	71.4°N 101.7°E	—				^{[a]}
March 12, 2146	15:58:15	132	Annular	0.4821	0.9995	0:03	24.4°N 65.0°W	2	1.2	Annular: El Salvador, Honduras, Jamaica, Turks and Caicos Islands, France		^{[a]}
September 6, 2146	06:44:00	137	Annular	−0.4249	0.9639	4:13	17.8°S 72.6°E	143	89	Annular: Angola, Democratic Republic of the Congo, Tanzania		^{[a]}
March 2, 2147	05:18:54	142	Total	−0.2360	1.0452	4:02	20.5°S 108.8°E	155	96	Total: Indonesia, Papua New Guinea		^{[a]}
August 26, 2147	08:09:15	147	Annular	0.3271	0.9425	6:49	29.0°N 65.2°E	224	139	Annular: Morocco, Spain, Algeria, Tunisia, Italy, Greece, Turkey, Syria, Iraq, Iran, Afghanistan, Pakistan, India, Myanmar, Thailand, VietnamMalaysia, Brunei, Indonesia		^{[a]}
February 19, 2148	21:18:00	152	Total	−0.9111	1.0370	2:13	70.9°S 88.3°W	305	190	Total: Antarctica		^{[a]}
August 14, 2148	09:22:21	157	Partial	1.0655	0.8562	—	70.7°N 178.0°E	—				^{[a]}
January 9, 2149	21:30:38	124	Partial	1.1802	0.6575	—	67.9°N 146.7°W	—				^{[a]}
July 5, 2149	07:59:34	129	Total	−0.8544	1.0408	3:38	36.3°S 62.4°E	264	164	Total: None		^{[a]}
December 29–30, 2149	01:13:04	134	Annular	0.5253	0.9245	10:42	8.6°N 164.7°E	334	208	Annular: China, Taiwan, Ryukyu Islands, Guam, Northern Mariana Islands, Marshall Islands, Hawaii		^{[a]}
June 24–25, 2150	00:17:25	139	Total	−0.0910	1.0802	7:14	18.3°N 178.1°E	260	160	Total: Indonesia, Micronesia		^{[a]}
December 18–19, 2150	00:17:02	144	Annular	−0.1535	0.9211	9:46	32.3°S 175.0°E	302	188	Annular: Indonesia, East Timor, Australia		^{[a]}
June 14, 2151	17:13:45	149	Total	0.6561	1.0569	3:48	63.7°N 89.4°W	249	155	Total: Canada, Greenland, Ireland, United Kingdom, Netherlands, Belgium, France, Luxembourg, Germany, Switzerland, Austria, Italy, Slovenia, Croatia, Bosnia and Herzegovina		^{[a]}
December 7–8, 2151	02:18:31	154	Annular	−0.8320	0.9526	3:22	75.1°S 103.1°E	314	195	Annular: Antarctica		^{[a]}
May 4, 2152	18:14:02	121	Partial	−1.2679	0.5044	—	62.3°S 36.8°W	—				^{[a]}
June 3, 2152	06:11:19	159	Partial	1.4645	0.1478	—	64.5°N 61.5°W	—				^{[a]}
October 27–28, 2152	00:57:34	126	Partial	1.2213	0.5926	—	61.9°N 133.3°W	—				^{[a]}
November 26, 2152	11:41:08	164	Partial	−1.4665	0.1409	—	63.8°S 138.4°W	—				^{[a]}
April 23, 2153	20:29:24	131	Annular	−0.5557	0.9364	7:31	17.9°S 111.8°W	279	173	Annular: Peru, Ecuador, Brazil		^{[a]}
October 17, 2153	17:12:18	136	Total	0.5259	1.0560	4:36	18.8°N 65.7°W	214	133	Total: Alaska, Canada, Montana, North Dakota, South Dakota, Minnesota, Iowa, Illinois, Indiana, Kentucky, Tennessee, North Carolina, South Carolina, Georgia, Puerto Rico, U.S. Virgin Islands, British Virgin Islands, Dominica, Martinique, Saint Lucia, Saint Vincent and the Grenadines, Barbados		^{[a]}
April 12, 2154	20:43:01	141	Annular	0.1794	0.9478	5:42	18.2°N 134.2°W	195	121	Annular: Fiji, Wallis and Futuna, Samoa, Cook Islands, Mexico, California, Arizona, New Mexico, Colorado, Oklahoma, Kansas, Missouri, Illinois, Indiana, Kentucky, Ohio, Pennsylvania, West Virginia, Virginia, Maryland, New Jersey, Delaware		^{[a]}
October 7, 2154	08:03:50	146	Total	−0.1867	1.0234	2:05	15.1°S 52.1°E	81	50	Total: Mali, Niger, Chad, Central African Republic, South Sudan, Uganda, Kenya, Madagascar		^{[a]}
April 1–2, 2155	02:06:34	151	Annular	0.8975	0.9844	1:07	55.6°N 101.3°E	123	76	Annular: Afghanistan, Pakistan, India, China, Mongolia, Siberia		^{[a]}
September 26, 2155	17:14:27	156	Annular	−0.9654	0.9593	2:55	58.6°S 143.0°W	570	350	Annular: Antarctica		^{[a]}
February 21, 2156	04:36:02	123	Partial	−1.0995	0.8230	—	61.6°S 133.7°W	—				^{[a]}
August 16, 2156	03:41:28	128	Partial	1.1584	0.6912	—	61.9°N 116.1°W	—				^{[a]}
February 9, 2157	20:25:36	133	Total	−0.4358	1.0362	2:49	37.7°S 108.4°W	135	84	Total: Peru, Brazil		^{[a]}
August 5, 2157	06:14:20	138	Annular	0.3743	0.9792	1:59	37.1°N 99.6°E	80	50	Annular: Corsica, Italy, Croatia, Bosnia and Herzegovina, Serbia, Romania, Moldova, Ukraine, Russia, Kazakhstan, China, Philippines, Palau		^{[a]}
January 30, 2158	08:54:37	143	Annular	0.2620	0.9863	1:27	3.4°S 45.5°E	50	31	Annular: Angola, Zambia, Democratic Republic of the Congo, Tanzania, India, Nepal, China		^{[a]}
July 25, 2158	15:49:17	148	Total	−0.4087	1.0356	3:32	3.4°S 61.8°W	131	81	Total: Colombia, Brazil		^{[a]}
January 19, 2159	14:23:27	153	Annular	0.9974	0.9600	—	63.4°N 74.2°W	—		Annular: Canada, Greenland		^{[a]}
June 15–16, 2159	00:42:44	120	Partial	1.3668	0.3124	—	66.5°N 17.0°W	—				^{[a]}
July 15, 2159	07:20:50	158	Partial	−1.1288	0.7743	—	64.0°S 36.7°E	—				^{[a]}
December 9, 2159	18:58:33	125	Partial	−1.3663	0.3392	—	67.2°S 74.4°E	—				^{[a]}
June 4, 2160	16:58:36	130	Total	0.6645	1.0428	2:58	64.5°N 74.9°W	192	119	Total: Canada, Greenland, France, Sardinia		^{[a]}
November 27, 2160	22:58:32	135	Annular	−0.6247	0.9734	2:12	60.1°S 171.6°W	123	76	Annular: Australia		^{[a]}
May 25, 2161	04:05:43	140	Annular	−0.0950	0.9898	1:12	15.7°N 119.8°E	36	22	Annular: Thailand, Cambodia, Vietnam, Philippines		^{[a]}
November 17, 2161	10:19:30	145	Total	0.1012	1.0325	3:13	13.4°S 23.6°E	110	68	Total: Angola, Zambia, Mozambique, Malawi, Madagascar, British Indian Ocean Territory		^{[a]}
May 14, 2162	07:52:46	150	Annular	−0.8775	0.9396	6:37	42.3°S 72.8°E	468	291	Annular: None		^{[a]}
November 6–7, 2162	01:59:40	155	Total	0.7788	1.0489	4:05	34.1°N 158.3°E	258	160	Total: Russian Far East, China, Japan		^{[a]}
April 3, 2163	16:41:51	122	Partial	1.2876	0.4698	—	71.9°N 175.0°W	—				^{[a]}
September 28, 2163	06:34:34	127	Partial	−1.1943	0.6377	—	72.1°S 15.6°W	—				^{[a]}
October 27, 2163	17:20:52	165	Partial	1.4919	0.0888	—	70.8°N 33.9°W	—				^{[a]}
March 22–23, 2164	00:02:47	132	Hybrid	0.5095	1.0051	0:29	30.4°N 172.1°E	20	12	Hybrid: Philippines, Southern Vancouver Island, Washington, Idaho, Montana		^{[a]}
September 16, 2164	13:48:20	137	Annular	−0.4885	0.9583	4:42	25.7°S 36.3°W	172	107	Annular: Peru, Bolivia, Brazil		^{[a]}
March 12, 2165	13:45:50	142	Total	−0.2130	1.0495	4:27	14.9°S 18.8°W	168	104	Total: Chile, Argentina, Brazil, Gabon, Republic of the Congo, Cameroon, Democratic Republic of the Congo, South Sudan, Kenya, Ethiopia		^{[a]}
September 5, 2165	14:52:45	147	Annular	0.2549	0.9406	7:22	20.7°N 37.5°W	227	141	Annular: Mexico, New Mexico, Texas, Oklahoma, Louisiana, Arkansas, Mississippi, Alabama, Georgia, South Carolina, Bermuda, Liberia, Côte d'Ivoire, São Tomé and Príncipe, Gabon, Republic of the Congo, Democratic Republic of the Congo		^{[a]}
March 2, 2166	05:53:21	152	Total	−0.8958	1.0388	2:26	65.4°S 134.4°E	294	183	Total: Antarctica		^{[a]}
August 25, 2166	16:13:35	157	Annular	0.9901	0.9531	3:00	74.4°N 41.5°E	—		Annular: Northwestern Russia, Norway, Finland		^{[a]}
January 21, 2167	05:56:25	124	Partial	1.1892	0.6413	—	68.9°N 75.5°E	—				^{[a]}
July 16, 2167	15:17:48	129	Total	−0.9262	1.0410	3:19	46.8°S 52.4°W	368	229	Total: Chile, Argentina		^{[a]}
January 10, 2168	09:19:03	134	Annular	0.5337	0.9230	10:55	10.3°N 42.1°E	344	214	Annular: Morocco, Western Sahara, Mauritania, Algeria, Mali, Niger, Chad, Sudan, South Sudan, Ethiopia, Djibouti, Somalia, Socotra, India, Nepal, China		^{[a]}
July 5, 2168	07:45:23	139	Total	−0.1660	1.0807	7:26	13.2°N 66.4°E	264	164	Total: Angola, Republic of the Congo, Democratic Republic of the Congo, South Sudan, Uganda, Kenya, Ethiopia, Somalia, Socotra, India, Indonesia, Malaysia, Singapore, East Timor		^{[a]}
December 29, 2168	08:19:33	144	Annular	−0.1444	0.9215	9:52	31.6°S 56.7°E	300	190	Annular: Angola, Namibia, Botswana, South Africa, Zimbabwe, Mozambique, Eswatini, Indonesia		^{[a]}
June 24–25, 2169	00:37:09	149	Total	0.5841	1.0562	3:58	59.2°N 168.6°E	229	142	Total: China, Russian Far East, Alaska, Washington, Oregon, Idaho, Nevada, Utah, Wyoming, Colorado, New Mexico, Kansas, Oklahoma, Texas		^{[a]}
December 18, 2169	10:37:07	154	Annular	−0.8213	0.9544	3:15	77.3°S 6.1°W	295	183	Annular: Chile, Argentina, Falkland Islands, Antarctica		^{[a]}
May 15–16, 2170	01:18:33	121	Partial	−1.3371	0.3831	—	63.0°S 151.9°W	—				^{[a]}
June 14, 2170	13:15:11	159	Partial	1.3963	0.2719	—	65.4°N 177.1°W	—				^{[a]}
November 8, 2170	09:23:07	126	Partial	1.2426	0.5524	—	62.5°N 91.6°E	—				^{[a]}
December 7, 2170	20:17:08	164	Partial	−1.4530	0.1653	—	64.7°S 83.1°E	—				^{[a]}
May 5, 2171	03:23:15	131	Annular	−0.6209	0.9378	7:32	19.4°S 144.8°E	289	180	Annular: Australia, Solomon Islands, Wallis and Futuna, Samoa, American Samoa		^{[a]}
October 28–29, 2171	01:31:03	136	Total	0.5577	1.0516	4:23	17.6°N 169.1°E	203	126	Total: Russian Far East, Northeastern China, Japan		^{[a]}
April 23, 2172	03:53:15	141	Annular	0.1234	0.9528	5:12	19.2°N 119.6°E	174	108	Annular: Indonesia, Singapore, Malaysia, Taiwan, Ryukyu Islands		^{[a]}
October 17, 2172	16:01:36	146	Hybrid	−0.1484	1.0174	1:34	17.3°S 66.6°W	60	37	Hybrid: Ecuador, Peru, Bolivia, Paraguay, Argentina, Brazil		^{[a]}
April 12, 2173	09:49:40	151	Annular	0.8515	0.9919	0:35	56.2°N 10.3°W	53	33	Annular: Azores, Faroe Islands, Svalbard		^{[a]}
October 6–7, 2173	00:39:14	156	Annular	−0.9187	0.9558	3:17	57.8°S 114.0°E	402	250	Annular: Antarctica		^{[a]}
March 3, 2174	13:11:54	123	Partial	−1.1162	0.7924	—	61.3°S 88.7°E	—				^{[a]}
April 1, 2174	22:39:09	161	Partial	1.5107	0.0470	—	61.2°N 103.8°E	—				^{[a]}
August 27, 2174	10:19:55	128	Partial	1.2336	0.5629	—	61.4°N 135.6°E	—				^{[a]}
February 21, 2175	05:04:24	133	Total	−0.4495	1.0362	2:50	34.2°S 122.9°E	135	84	Total: Australia, Papua New Guinea, Solomon Islands		^{[a]}
August 16, 2175	13:08:17	138	Annular	0.4497	0.9802	1:50	37.6°N 0.5°W	78	48	Annular: Canada, Spain, Portugal, Algeria, Libya, Niger, Chad, Sudan, South Sudan, Ethiopia, Kenya, Somalia		^{[a]}
February 10, 2176	17:21:21	143	Annular	0.2532	0.9849	1:34	0.9°S 81.3°W	55	34	Annular: French Polynesia, Colombia, Venezuela, Curaçao, Anguilla, Sint Maarten, Azores		^{[a]}
August 4, 2176	23:05:55	148	Total	−0.3333	1.0383	3:40	1.3°S 170.5°W	136	85	Total: Palau, Micronesia, Marshall Islands, Cook Islands		^{[a]}
January 29, 2177	22:30:30	153	Annular	0.9897	0.9212	6:55	57.6°N 165.1°E	—		Annular: Russian Far East		^{[a]}
June 26, 2177	08:13:28	120	Partial	1.4371	0.1758	—	65.5°N 139.8°W	—				^{[a]}
July 25, 2177	14:50:33	158	Partial	−1.0564	0.9149	—	63.2°S 85.0°W	—				^{[a]}
December 20, 2177	03:01:35	125	Partial	−1.3747	0.3251	—	66.1°S 56.8°W	—				^{[a]}
June 15–16, 2178	00:20:42	130	Total	0.7378	1.0396	2:36	71.0°N 175.3°W	198	123	Total: Kazakhstan, Russia, Alaska, Canada, Montana, North Dakota, South Dakota, Nebraska, Iowa, Missouri, Illinois		^{[a]}
December 9, 2178	07:20:03	135	Annular	−0.6338	0.9745	2:03	62.4°S 69.9°E	118	73	Annular: Southeastern Australia		^{[a]}
June 5, 2179	11:05:36	140	Annular	−0.0209	0.9884	1:21	21.5°N 15.0°E	41	25	Annular: Brazil, Guinea-Bissau, Senegal, Gambia, Mali, Mauritania, Algeria, Niger, Chad, Libya, Sudan, Eritrea, Yemen, Somalia, Maldives		^{[a]}
November 28, 2179	18:54:18	145	Total	0.0867	1.0325	3:12	16.5°S 104.6°W	110	68	Total: Peru, Brazil		^{[a]}
May 24, 2180	14:34:28	150	Annular	−0.8035	0.9422	6:59	32.6°S 32.9°W	359	223	Annular: Chile, Argentina		^{[a]}
November 17, 2180	10:34:01	155	Total	0.7605	1.0465	4:03	30.1°N 26.5°E	238	148	Total: Spain, Algeria, Tunisia, Libya, Egypt, Israel, Jordan, Saudi Arabia, Iraq, Kuwait, Iran, Afghanistan, Tajikistan, Western China		^{[a]}
April 13–14, 2181	00:04:05	122	Partial	1.3318	0.3931	—	71.5°N 60.8°E	—				^{[a]}
May 13, 2181	14:55:43	160	Partial	−1.5323	0.0510	—	69.4°S 16.9°W	—				^{[a]}
October 8, 2181	14:19:36	127	Partial	−1.2408	0.5529	—	71.9°S 145.8°W	—				^{[a]}
November 7, 2181	01:38:23	165	Partial	1.4718	0.1280	—	70.0°N 170.9°W	—				^{[a]}
April 3, 2182	07:59:43	132	Hybrid	0.5439	1.0108	0:58	36.9°N 51.0°E	44	27	Hybrid: Mauritania, Mali, Niger, Chad, Libya, Egypt, Saudi Arabia, Jordan, Iraq, Iran, Turkmenistan, Uzbekistan, Kazakhstan, Mongolia, Russian Far East, Northeastern China		^{[a]}
September 27, 2182	20:58:45	137	Annular	−0.5461	0.9527	5:05	33.5°S 146.7°W	205	127	Annular: Vanuatu, Fiji, Tonga, Chile, Argentina		^{[a]}
March 23, 2183	22:06:49	142	Total	−0.1848	1.0540	4:54	8.9°S 145.2°W	181	112	Total: Australia, Cook Islands		^{[a]}
September 16, 2183	21:42:37	147	Annular	0.1877	0.9384	7:53	12.8°N 141.9°W	233	145	Annular: Hawaii		^{[a]}
March 12, 2184	14:22:32	152	Total	−0.8755	1.0409	2:43	59.4°S 0.2°W	283	176	Total: Antarctica		^{[a]}
September 4, 2184	23:11:00	157	Annular	0.9185	0.9576	3:12	67.1°N 123.3°W	393	244	Annular: Canada		^{[a]}
January 31, 2185	14:20:20	124	Partial	1.1991	0.6238	—	69.9°N 62.4°W	—				^{[a]}
July 26, 2185	22:38:16	129	Total	−0.9967	1.0370	2:27	67.9°S 178.5°W	—		Total: None		^{[a]}
January 20, 2186	17:23:44	134	Annular	0.5426	0.9221	10:53	12.8°N 80.3°W	350	220	Annular: El Salvador, Honduras, Nicaragua, Costa Rica, Dominican Republic, Puerto Rico, U.S. Virgin Islands, British Virgin Islands		^{[a]}
July 16, 2186	15:14:54	139	Total	−0.2396	1.0805	7:29	7.4°N 46.5°W	267	166	Total: Galapagos Islands, Colombia, Venezuela, Guyana		^{[a]}
January 9, 2187	16:23:41	144	Annular	−0.1365	0.9224	9:51	30.0°S 62.1°W	296	184	Annular: Chile, Argentina, Uruguay, Brazil		^{[a]}
July 6, 2187	07:58:31	149	Total	0.5109	1.0548	4:06	53.6°N 63.8°E	211	131	Total: Canary Islands, Morocco, Spain, Corsica, Italy, Croatia, Bosnia and Herzegovina, Serbia, Hungary, Romania, Moldova, Ukraine, Russia, Kazakhstan, Mongolia, China, South Korea, Japan		^{[a]}
December 29, 2187	18:59:03	154	Annular	−0.8126	0.9565	3:07	77.7°S 111.2°W	274	170	Annular: Antarctica		^{[a]}
May 26, 2188	08:15:53	121	Partial	−1.4109	0.2538	—	63.8°S 94.6°E	—				^{[a]}
June 24, 2188	20:14:39	159	Partial	1.3252	0.4008	—	66.4°N 68.0°E	—				^{[a]}
November 18, 2188	17:55:25	126	Partial	1.2591	0.5212	—	63.2°N 45.5°W	—				^{[a]}
December 18, 2188	04:56:59	164	Partial	−1.4420	0.1850	—	65.7°S 56.6°W	—				^{[a]}
May 15, 2189	10:08:34	131	Annular	−0.6928	0.9387	7:31	22.6°S 43.3°E	309	192	Annular: Madagascar		^{[a]}
November 8, 2189	09:57:28	136	Total	0.5830	1.0474	4:10	16.5°N 41.6°E	192	119	Total: Ireland, United Kingdom, France, Monaco, Italy, Libya, Egypt, Sudan, Eritrea, Yemen, Somalia, India, Sri Lanka		^{[a]}
May 4, 2190	10:56:30	141	Annular	0.0608	0.9577	4:45	19.4°N 15.4°E	154	96	Annular: Ghana, Togo, Benin, Nigeria, Niger, Chad, Libya, Egypt, Israel, Jordan, Saudi Arabia, Iraq, Iran, Afghanistan, Pakistan, India		^{[a]}
October 28–29, 2190	00:05:50	146	Hybrid	−0.1161	1.0116	1:04	19.6°S 173.2°E	40	25	Hybrid: Philippines, Vanuatu		^{[a]}
April 23, 2191	17:26:06	151	Annular	0.7991	0.9993	0:03	57.0°N 119.2°W	4	2.5	Annular: Canada, Greenland, Svalbard		^{[a]}
October 18, 2191	08:11:12	156	Annular	−0.8783	0.9516	3:39	58.7°S 5.2°E	365	227	Annular: Antarctica		^{[a]}
March 13, 2192	21:40:00	123	Partial	−1.1395	0.7491	—	61.1°S 46.8°W	—				^{[a]}
April 12, 2192	06:41:56	161	Partial	1.4678	0.1260	—	61.5°N 25.4°W	—				^{[a]}
September 6, 2192	17:05:08	128	Partial	1.3032	0.4444	—	61.2°N 25.8°E	—				^{[a]}
March 3, 2193	13:36:08	133	Total	−0.4689	1.0365	2:53	30.9°S 4.4°W	137	85	Total: Angola, Democratic Republic of the Congo, Burundi, Tanzania, Kenya, Somalia		^{[a]}
August 26, 2193	20:09:20	138	Annular	0.5200	0.9806	1:45	37.4°N 102.9°W	80	50	Annular: Russian Far East, Alaska, Canada, Washington, Idaho, Montana, Wyoming, Colorado, New Mexico, Oklahoma, Texas, Mexico, Colombia, Venezuela, Guyana, Suriname		^{[a]}
February 20–21, 2194	01:41:31	143	Annular	0.2396	0.9840	1:38	1.9°N 153.5°E	58	36	Annular: Australia, Indonesia, Papua New Guinea		^{[a]}
August 16, 2194	06:28:08	148	Total	−0.2616	1.0403	3:44	0.2°S 79.6°E	139	86	Total: Chad, Central African Republic, Sudan, South Sudan, Ethiopia, Eritrea, Yemen, Socotra, Maldives, Australia		^{[a]}
February 10, 2195	06:34:27	153	Annular	0.9797	0.9218	6:52	55.2°N 41.6°E	—		Annular: Hungary, Romania, Moldova, Slovakia, Ukraine, Poland, Belarus, Lithuania, Latvia, Estonia, Russia, Finland		^{[a]}
July 7, 2195	15:41:21	120	Partial	1.5095	0.0353	—	64.6°N 98.5°E	—				^{[a]}
August 5, 2195	22:21:03	158	Total	−0.9843	1.0618	4:03	56.1°S 166.4°E	—		Total: None		^{[a]}
December 31, 2195	11:09:22	125	Partial	−1.3797	0.3166	—	65.1°S 171.4°E	—				^{[a]}
June 26, 2196	07:37:40	130	Total	0.8149	1.0356	2:12	76.3°N 97.0°E	208	129	Total: Iceland, Svalbard, Russia		^{[a]}
December 19, 2196	15:47:09	135	Annular	−0.6387	0.9761	1:53	63.1°S 48.6°W	111	69	Annular: Antarctic Peninsula, South Africa		^{[a]}
June 15, 2197	17:59:33	140	Annular	0.0574	0.9864	1:32	26.8°N 87.6°W	48	30	Annular: Mexico, Texas, Florida, Bahamas, Turks and Caicos Islands, British Virgin Islands, Anguilla, Sint Maarten, Antigua and Barbuda		^{[a]}
December 9, 2197	03:35:07	145	Total	0.0769	1.0329	3:13	18.5°S 126.0°E	111	69	Total: Maldives, Cocos Islands, Australia, Solomon Islands, Kiribati		^{[a]}
June 4, 2198	21:11:35	150	Annular	−0.7260	0.9442	7:13	24.2°S 135.7°W	299	186	Annular: Pitcairn Islands		^{[a]}
November 28, 2198	19:12:46	155	Total	0.7459	1.0442	3:58	26.9°N 106.0°W	221	137	Total: Mexico, Texas, Louisiana, Florida, Georgia		^{[a]}
April 25, 2199	07:21:51	122	Partial	1.3799	0.3085	—	70.8°N 61.7°W	—				^{[a]}
May 24, 2199	21:42:07	160	Partial	−1.4596	0.1742	—	68.5°S 130.1°W	—				^{[a]}
October 19, 2199	22:10:26	127	Partial	−1.2817	0.4790	—	71.4°S 82.9°E	—				^{[a]}
November 18, 2199	10:01:01	165	Partial	1.4564	0.1583	—	69.1°N 51.4°E	—				^{[a]}
April 14, 2200	15:49:57	132	Total	0.5847	1.0165	1:23	43.8°N 68.3°W	69	43	Total: Mexico, Texas, Louisiana, Mississippi, Alabama, Tennessee, Kentucky, Virginia, West Virginia, Maryland, Pennsylvania, New Jersey, New York, Connecticut, Massachusetts, New Hampshire, Maine, Canada, Ireland, United Kingdom, Netherlands, Germany, Poland		^{[a]}
October 9, 2200	04:16:21	137	Annular	−0.5972	0.9470	5:25	41.1°S 101.3°E	241	150	Annular: Madagascar, Réunion, Mauritius		^{[a]}
