= Solar eclipse of December 6, 2067 =

Hybrid eclipse

- Hybrid eclipse
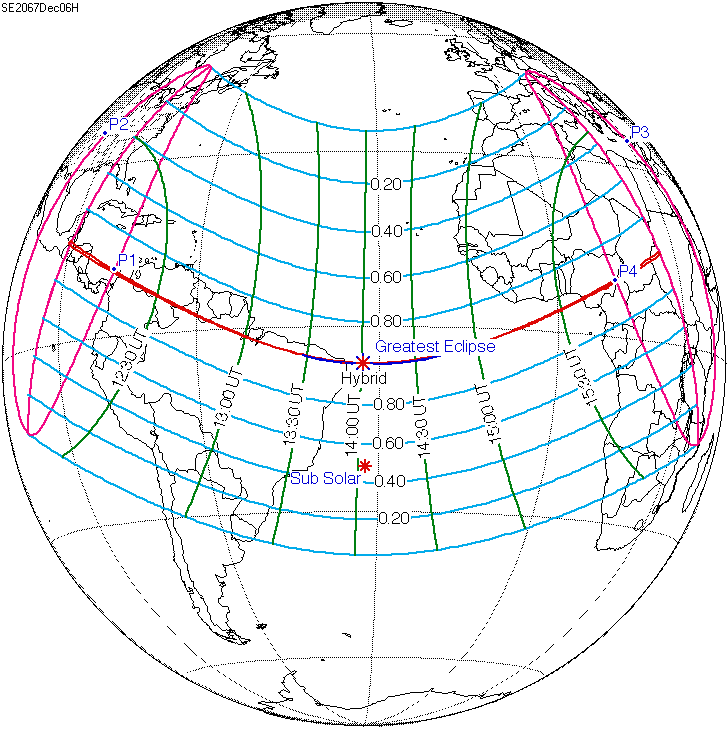
- Map
- Gamma: 0.2845
- Magnitude: 1.0011

Maximum eclipse
- Duration: 8 s (0 min 8 s)
- Coordinates: 6°S 32.4°W
- Max. width of band: 4 km (2.5 mi)

Times (UTC)
- Greatest eclipse: 14:03:43

References
- Saros: 143 (26 of 72)
- Catalog # (SE5000): 9659

A total solar eclipse will occur at the Moon's ascending node of orbit on Tuesday, December 6, 2067, with a magnitude of 1.0011. It is a hybrid event, beginning and ending as an annular eclipse. A solar eclipse occurs when the Moon passes between Earth and the Sun, thereby totally or partly obscuring the image of the Sun for a viewer on Earth. A hybrid solar eclipse is a rare type of solar eclipse that changes its appearance from annular to total and back as the Moon's shadow moves across the Earth's surface. Totality occurs between the annularity paths across the surface of the Earth, with the partial solar eclipse visible over a surrounding region thousands of kilometres wide. Occurring about 3.4 days before perigee (on December 10, 2067, at 0:40 UTC), the Moon's apparent diameter will be larger.

The path of the eclipse will be visible as an annular eclipse from parts of southeastern Mexico, Guatemala, southern Belize, Honduras, Nicaragua, Colombia, Venezuela, Brazil, and Guyana before transitioning to a total eclipse. Totality will be visible from parts of Brazil before the eclipse transforms back to an annular eclipse, then passing over Nigeria, Cameroon, Chad, and Sudan. A partial solar eclipse will also be visible for parts of eastern North America, Central America, the Caribbean, northern and central South America, southern Europe, and Africa.

== Eclipse details ==
Shown below are two tables displaying details about this particular solar eclipse. The first table outlines times at which the Moon's penumbra or umbra attains the specific parameter, and the second table describes various other parameters pertaining to this eclipse.

December 6, 2067 Solar Eclipse Times
Event	Time (UTC)
First Penumbral External Contact	2067 December 06 at 11:18:45.6 UTC
First Umbral External Contact	2067 December 06 at 12:19:30.5 UTC
First Central Line	2067 December 06 at 12:20:00.2 UTC
Greatest Duration	2067 December 06 at 12:20:00.2 UTC
First Umbral Internal Contact	2067 December 06 at 12:20:29.9 UTC
First Penumbral Internal Contact	2067 December 06 at 13:26:13.3 UTC
Equatorial Conjunction	2067 December 06 at 14:03:13.4 UTC
Greatest Eclipse	2067 December 06 at 14:03:43.3 UTC
Ecliptic Conjunction	2067 December 06 at 14:06:46.9 UTC
Last Penumbral Internal Contact	2067 December 06 at 14:41:15.1 UTC
Last Umbral Internal Contact	2067 December 06 at 15:46:59.0 UTC
Last Central Line	2067 December 06 at 15:47:26.0 UTC
Last Umbral External Contact	2067 December 06 at 15:47:53.0 UTC
Last Penumbral External Contact	2067 December 06 at 16:48:35.3 UTC

December 6, 2067 Solar Eclipse Parameters
Parameter	Value
Eclipse Magnitude	1.00113
Eclipse Obscuration	1.00226
Gamma	0.28446
Sun Right Ascension	16h52m45.8s
Sun Declination	-22°31'49.1"
Sun Semi-Diameter	16'13.8"
Sun Equatorial Horizontal Parallax	08.9"
Moon Right Ascension	16h52m46.9s
Moon Declination	-22°15'09.9"
Moon Semi-Diameter	15'59.7"
Moon Equatorial Horizontal Parallax	0°58'42.2"
ΔT	96.0 s

== Eclipse season ==
This eclipse is part of an eclipse season, a period, roughly every six months, when eclipses occur. Only two (or occasionally three) eclipse seasons occur each year, and each season lasts about 35 days and repeats just short of six months (173 days) later; thus two full eclipse seasons always occur each year. Either two or three eclipses happen each eclipse season. In the sequence below, each eclipse is separated by a fortnight.

Eclipse season of November–December 2067
November 21 Descending node (full moon)	December 6 Ascending node (new moon)
Penumbral lunar eclipse Lunar Saros 117	Hybrid solar eclipse Solar Saros 143

== Related eclipses ==
=== Eclipses in 2067 ===
- A penumbral lunar eclipse on May 28.
- An annular solar eclipse on June 11.
- A penumbral lunar eclipse on June 27.
- A penumbral lunar eclipse on November 21.
- A hybrid solar eclipse on December 6.

=== Metonic ===
- Preceded by: Solar eclipse of February 17, 2064
- Followed by: Solar eclipse of September 23, 2071

=== Tzolkinex ===
- Preceded by: Solar eclipse of October 24, 2060
- Followed by: Solar eclipse of January 16, 2075

=== Half-Saros ===
- Preceded by: Lunar eclipse of November 30, 2058
- Followed by: Lunar eclipse of December 10, 2076

=== Tritos ===
- Preceded by: Solar eclipse of January 5, 2057
- Followed by: Solar eclipse of November 4, 2078

=== Solar Saros 143 ===
- Preceded by: Solar eclipse of November 25, 2049
- Followed by: Solar eclipse of December 16, 2085

=== Inex ===
- Preceded by: Solar eclipse of December 26, 2038
- Followed by: Solar eclipse of November 15, 2096

=== Triad ===
- Preceded by: Solar eclipse of February 4, 1981
- Followed by: Solar eclipse of October 7, 2154

=== Solar eclipses of 2065–2069 ===
This eclipse is a member of a semester series. An eclipse in a semester series of solar eclipses repeats approximately every 177 days and 4 hours (a semester) at alternating nodes of the Moon's orbit.

The partial solar eclipses on February 5, 2065 and August 2, 2065 occur in the previous lunar year eclipse set, and the partial solar eclipses on April 21, 2069 and October 15, 2069 occur in the next lunar year eclipse set.

Solar eclipse series sets from 2065 to 2069
Descending node			Ascending node		
Saros	Map	Gamma	Saros	Map	Gamma
118	July 3, 2065 Partial	1.4619	123	December 27, 2065 Partial	−1.0688
128	June 22, 2066 Annular	0.733	133	December 17, 2066 Total	−0.4043
138	June 11, 2067 Annular	−0.0387	143	December 6, 2067 Hybrid	0.2845
148	May 31, 2068 Total	−0.797	153	November 24, 2068 Partial	1.0299
158	May 20, 2069 Partial	−1.4852			

=== Saros 143 ===
This eclipse is a part of Saros series 143, repeating every 18 years, 11 days, and containing 72 events. The series started with a partial solar eclipse on March 7, 1617. It contains total eclipses from June 24, 1797 through October 24, 1995; hybrid eclipses from November 3, 2013 through December 6, 2067; and annular eclipses from December 16, 2085 through September 16, 2536. The series ends at member 72 as a partial eclipse on April 23, 2897. Its eclipses are tabulated in three columns; every third eclipse in the same column is one exeligmos apart, so they all cast shadows over approximately the same parts of the Earth.

The longest duration of totality was produced by member 16 at 3 minutes, 50 seconds on August 19, 1887, and the longest duration of annularity will be produced by member 51 at 4 minutes, 54 seconds on September 6, 2518. All eclipses in this series occur at the Moon’s ascending node of orbit.

Series members 12–33 occur between 1801 and 2200:
12	13	14
July 6, 1815	July 17, 1833	July 28, 1851
15	16	17
August 7, 1869	August 19, 1887	August 30, 1905
18	19	20
September 10, 1923	September 21, 1941	October 2, 1959
21	22	23
October 12, 1977	October 24, 1995	November 3, 2013
24	25	26
November 14, 2031	November 25, 2049	December 6, 2067
27	28	29
December 16, 2085	December 29, 2103	January 8, 2122
30	31	32
January 20, 2140	January 30, 2158	February 10, 2176
33
February 21, 2194

=== Metonic series ===
The metonic series repeats eclipses every 19 years (6939.69 days), lasting about 5 cycles. Eclipses occur in nearly the same calendar date. In addition, the octon subseries repeats 1/5 of that or every 3.8 years (1387.94 days). All eclipses in this table occur at the Moon's ascending node.

21 eclipse events between July 13, 2018 and July 12, 2094
July 12–13	April 30–May 1	February 16–17	December 5–6	September 22–23
117	119	121	123	125
July 13, 2018	April 30, 2022	February 17, 2026	December 5, 2029	September 23, 2033
127	129	131	133	135
July 13, 2037	April 30, 2041	February 16, 2045	December 5, 2048	September 22, 2052
137	139	141	143	145
July 12, 2056	April 30, 2060	February 17, 2064	December 6, 2067	September 23, 2071
147	149	151	153	155
July 13, 2075	May 1, 2079	February 16, 2083	December 6, 2086	September 23, 2090
157
July 12, 2094

=== Tritos series ===
This eclipse is a part of a tritos cycle, repeating at alternating nodes every 135 synodic months (≈ 3986.63 days, or 11 years minus 1 month). Their appearance and longitude are irregular due to a lack of synchronization with the anomalistic month (period of perigee), but groupings of 3 tritos cycles (≈ 33 years minus 3 months) come close (≈ 434.044 anomalistic months), so eclipses are similar in these groupings.

Series members between 1801 and 2200
December 21, 1805 (Saros 119)	November 19, 1816 (Saros 120)	October 20, 1827 (Saros 121)	September 18, 1838 (Saros 122)	August 18, 1849 (Saros 123)
July 18, 1860 (Saros 124)	June 18, 1871 (Saros 125)	May 17, 1882 (Saros 126)	April 16, 1893 (Saros 127)	March 17, 1904 (Saros 128)
February 14, 1915 (Saros 129)	January 14, 1926 (Saros 130)	December 13, 1936 (Saros 131)	November 12, 1947 (Saros 132)	October 12, 1958 (Saros 133)
September 11, 1969 (Saros 134)	August 10, 1980 (Saros 135)	July 11, 1991 (Saros 136)	June 10, 2002 (Saros 137)	May 10, 2013 (Saros 138)
April 8, 2024 (Saros 139)	March 9, 2035 (Saros 140)	February 5, 2046 (Saros 141)	January 5, 2057 (Saros 142)	December 6, 2067 (Saros 143)
November 4, 2078 (Saros 144)	October 4, 2089 (Saros 145)	September 4, 2100 (Saros 146)	August 4, 2111 (Saros 147)	July 4, 2122 (Saros 148)
June 3, 2133 (Saros 149)	May 3, 2144 (Saros 150)	April 2, 2155 (Saros 151)	March 2, 2166 (Saros 152)	January 29, 2177 (Saros 153)
December 29, 2187 (Saros 154)	November 28, 2198 (Saros 155)			

=== Inex series ===
This eclipse is a part of the long period inex cycle, repeating at alternating nodes, every 358 synodic months (≈ 10,571.95 days, or 29 years minus 20 days). Their appearance and longitude are irregular due to a lack of synchronization with the anomalistic month (period of perigee). However, groupings of 3 inex cycles (≈ 87 years minus 2 months) comes close (≈ 1,151.02 anomalistic months), so eclipses are similar in these groupings.

Series members between 1801 and 2200
June 6, 1807 (Saros 134)	May 15, 1836 (Saros 135)	April 25, 1865 (Saros 136)
April 6, 1894 (Saros 137)	March 17, 1923 (Saros 138)	February 25, 1952 (Saros 139)
February 4, 1981 (Saros 140)	January 15, 2010 (Saros 141)	December 26, 2038 (Saros 142)
December 6, 2067 (Saros 143)	November 15, 2096 (Saros 144)	October 26, 2125 (Saros 145)
October 7, 2154 (Saros 146)	September 16, 2183 (Saros 147)	
