= Solar eclipse of September 23, 2090 =

Total eclipse

- Total eclipse
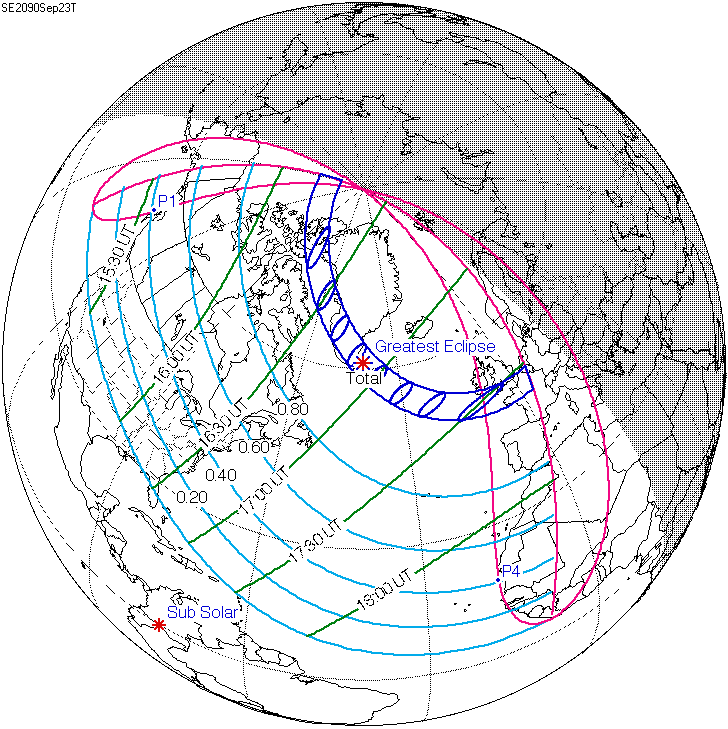
- Map
- Gamma: 0.9157
- Magnitude: 1.0562

Maximum eclipse
- Duration: 216 s (3 min 36 s)
- Coordinates: 60.7°N 40.5°W
- Max. width of band: 463 km (288 mi)

Times (UTC)
- Greatest eclipse: 16:56:36

References
- Saros: 155 (10 of 71)
- Catalog # (SE5000): 9711

A total solar eclipse will occur at the Moon's ascending node of orbit on Saturday, September 23, 2090, with a magnitude of 1.0562. A solar eclipse occurs when the Moon passes between Earth and the Sun, thereby totally or partly obscuring the image of the Sun for a viewer on Earth. A total solar eclipse occurs when the Moon's apparent diameter is larger than the Sun's, blocking all direct sunlight, turning day into darkness. Totality occurs in a narrow path across Earth's surface, with the partial solar eclipse visible over a surrounding region thousands of kilometres wide. Occurring about 4 hours after perigee (on September 23, 2090, at 12:40 UTC), the Moon's apparent diameter will be larger.

The path of totality will be visible from parts of northern Canada, Greenland, southern Ireland, the southern United Kingdom, France, and Belgium. A partial solar eclipse will also be visible for parts of North America, Western Europe, and West Africa.

This solar eclipse will be the first total solar eclipse visible from Great Britain since August 11, 1999, and the first visible from Ireland since May 22, 1724. The totality will be visible in southern Greenland, Valentia, West Cork, Poole, Newquay, Plymouth, Southampton, Isle of Wight, northern France (including Paris and Rennes) and south Belgium and a partially eclipsed sun will be visible in Birmingham, London, Exeter, Cardiff, Belfast, Dublin, Weston Super Mare, Bristol and Oxford.

== Eclipse details ==
Shown below are two tables displaying details about this particular solar eclipse. The first table outlines times at which the Moon's penumbra or umbra attains the specific parameter, and the second table describes various other parameters pertaining to this eclipse.

September 23, 2090 Solar Eclipse Times
Event	Time (UTC)
First Penumbral External Contact	2090 September 23 at 14:50:25.0 UTC
First Umbral External Contact	2090 September 23 at 16:12:55.8 UTC
First Central Line	2090 September 23 at 16:16:08.2 UTC
First Umbral Internal Contact	2090 September 23 at 16:19:34.4 UTC
Equatorial Conjunction	2090 September 23 at 16:26:17.0 UTC
Greatest Eclipse	2090 September 23 at 16:56:36.3 UTC
Greatest Duration	2090 September 23 at 16:56:43.3 UTC
Ecliptic Conjunction	2090 September 23 at 17:05:47.3 UTC
Last Umbral Internal Contact	2090 September 23 at 17:34:01.1 UTC
Last Central Line	2090 September 23 at 17:37:26.6 UTC
Last Umbral External Contact	2090 September 23 at 17:40:38.4 UTC
Last Penumbral External Contact	2090 September 23 at 19:03:02.8 UTC

September 23, 2090 Solar Eclipse Parameters
Parameter	Value
Eclipse Magnitude	1.05615
Eclipse Obscuration	1.11546
Gamma	0.91569
Sun Right Ascension	12h04m19.6s
Sun Declination	-00°28'06.5"
Sun Semi-Diameter	15'56.2"
Sun Equatorial Horizontal Parallax	08.8"
Moon Right Ascension	12h05m28.3s
Moon Declination	+00°25'15.5"
Moon Semi-Diameter	16'43.4"
Moon Equatorial Horizontal Parallax	1°01'22.6"
ΔT	114.8 s

== Eclipse season ==
This eclipse is part of an eclipse season, a period, roughly every six months, when eclipses occur. Only two (or occasionally three) eclipse seasons occur each year, and each season lasts about 35 days and repeats just short of six months (173 days) later; thus two full eclipse seasons always occur each year. Either two or three eclipses happen each eclipse season. In the sequence below, each eclipse is separated by a fortnight.

Eclipse season of September 2090
September 8 Descending node (full moon)	September 23 Ascending node (new moon)
Total lunar eclipse Lunar Saros 129	Total solar eclipse Solar Saros 155

== Related eclipses ==
=== Eclipses in 2090 ===
- A total lunar eclipse on March 15.
- A partial solar eclipse on March 31.
- A total lunar eclipse on September 8.
- A total solar eclipse on September 23.

=== Metonic ===
- Preceded by: Solar eclipse of December 6, 2086
- Followed by: Solar eclipse of July 12, 2094

=== Tzolkinex ===
- Preceded by: Solar eclipse of August 13, 2083
- Followed by: Solar eclipse of November 4, 2097

=== Half-Saros ===
- Preceded by: Lunar eclipse of September 18, 2081
- Followed by: Lunar eclipse of September 29, 2099

=== Tritos ===
- Preceded by: Solar eclipse of October 24, 2079
- Followed by: Solar eclipse of August 24, 2101

=== Solar Saros 155 ===
- Preceded by: Solar eclipse of September 12, 2072
- Followed by: Solar eclipse of October 4, 2108

=== Inex ===
- Preceded by: Solar eclipse of October 13, 2061
- Followed by: Solar eclipse of September 5, 2119

=== Triad ===
- Preceded by: Solar eclipse of November 23, 2003
- Followed by: Solar eclipse of July 25, 2177

=== Solar eclipses of 2087–2090 ===
This eclipse is a member of a semester series. An eclipse in a semester series of solar eclipses repeats approximately every 177 days and 4 hours (a semester) at alternating nodes of the Moon's orbit.

The partial solar eclipse on June 1, 2087 occurs in the previous lunar year eclipse set.

Solar eclipse series sets from 2087 to 2090
Descending node			Ascending node		
Saros	Map	Gamma	Saros	Map	Gamma
120	May 2, 2087 Partial	1.1139	125	October 26, 2087 Partial	−1.2882
130	April 21, 2088 Total	0.4135	135	October 14, 2088 Annular	−0.5349
140	April 10, 2089 Annular	−0.3319	145	October 4, 2089 Total	0.2167
150	March 31, 2090 Partial	−1.1028	155	September 23, 2090 Total	0.9157

=== Saros 155 ===
This eclipse is a part of Saros series 155, repeating every 18 years, 11 days, and containing 71 events. The series started with a partial solar eclipse on June 17, 1928. It contains total eclipses from September 12, 2072 through August 30, 2649; hybrid eclipses from September 10, 2667 through October 2, 2703; and annular eclipses from October 13, 2721 through May 8, 3064. The series ends at member 71 as a partial eclipse on July 24, 3190. Its eclipses are tabulated in three columns; every third eclipse in the same column is one exeligmos apart, so they all cast shadows over approximately the same parts of the Earth.

The longest duration of totality will be produced by member 14 at 4 minutes, 5 seconds on November 6, 2162, and the longest duration of annularity will be produced by member 63 at 5 minutes, 31 seconds on April 28, 3046. All eclipses in this series occur at the Moon’s ascending node of orbit.

Series members 1–16 occur between 1928 and 2200:
1	2	3
June 17, 1928	June 29, 1946	July 9, 1964
4	5	6
July 20, 1982	July 31, 2000	August 11, 2018
7	8	9
August 21, 2036	September 2, 2054	September 12, 2072
10	11	12
September 23, 2090	October 5, 2108	October 16, 2126
13	14	15
October 26, 2144	November 7, 2162	November 17, 2180
16
November 28, 2198

=== Metonic series ===
The metonic series repeats eclipses every 19 years (6939.69 days), lasting about 5 cycles. Eclipses occur in nearly the same calendar date. In addition, the octon subseries repeats 1/5 of that or every 3.8 years (1387.94 days). All eclipses in this table occur at the Moon's ascending node.

21 eclipse events between July 13, 2018 and July 12, 2094
July 12–13	April 30–May 1	February 16–17	December 5–6	September 22–23
117	119	121	123	125
July 13, 2018	April 30, 2022	February 17, 2026	December 5, 2029	September 23, 2033
127	129	131	133	135
July 13, 2037	April 30, 2041	February 16, 2045	December 5, 2048	September 22, 2052
137	139	141	143	145
July 12, 2056	April 30, 2060	February 17, 2064	December 6, 2067	September 23, 2071
147	149	151	153	155
July 13, 2075	May 1, 2079	February 16, 2083	December 6, 2086	September 23, 2090
157
July 12, 2094

=== Tritos series ===
This eclipse is a part of a tritos cycle, repeating at alternating nodes every 135 synodic months (≈ 3986.63 days, or 11 years minus 1 month). Their appearance and longitude are irregular due to a lack of synchronization with the anomalistic month (period of perigee), but groupings of 3 tritos cycles (≈ 33 years minus 3 months) come close (≈ 434.044 anomalistic months), so eclipses are similar in these groupings.

The partial solar eclipses on December 18, 2188 (part of Saros 164) and November 18, 2199 (part of Saros 165) are also a part of this series but are not included in the table below.

Series members between 1801 and 2134
December 10, 1806 (Saros 129)	November 9, 1817 (Saros 130)	October 9, 1828 (Saros 131)	September 7, 1839 (Saros 132)	August 7, 1850 (Saros 133)
July 8, 1861 (Saros 134)	June 6, 1872 (Saros 135)	May 6, 1883 (Saros 136)	April 6, 1894 (Saros 137)	March 6, 1905 (Saros 138)
February 3, 1916 (Saros 139)	January 3, 1927 (Saros 140)	December 2, 1937 (Saros 141)	November 1, 1948 (Saros 142)	October 2, 1959 (Saros 143)
August 31, 1970 (Saros 144)	July 31, 1981 (Saros 145)	June 30, 1992 (Saros 146)	May 31, 2003 (Saros 147)	April 29, 2014 (Saros 148)
March 29, 2025 (Saros 149)	February 27, 2036 (Saros 150)	January 26, 2047 (Saros 151)	December 26, 2057 (Saros 152)	November 24, 2068 (Saros 153)
October 24, 2079 (Saros 154)	September 23, 2090 (Saros 155)	August 24, 2101 (Saros 156)	July 23, 2112 (Saros 157)	June 23, 2123 (Saros 158)
May 23, 2134 (Saros 159)

=== Inex series ===
This eclipse is a part of the long period inex cycle, repeating at alternating nodes, every 358 synodic months (≈ 10,571.95 days, or 29 years minus 20 days). Their appearance and longitude are irregular due to a lack of synchronization with the anomalistic month (period of perigee). However, groupings of 3 inex cycles (≈ 87 years minus 2 months) comes close (≈ 1,151.02 anomalistic months), so eclipses are similar in these groupings.

Series members between 1801 and 2200
April 13, 1801 (Saros 145)	March 24, 1830 (Saros 146)	March 4, 1859 (Saros 147)
February 11, 1888 (Saros 148)	January 23, 1917 (Saros 149)	January 3, 1946 (Saros 150)
December 13, 1974 (Saros 151)	November 23, 2003 (Saros 152)	November 3, 2032 (Saros 153)
October 13, 2061 (Saros 154)	September 23, 2090 (Saros 155)	September 5, 2119 (Saros 156)
August 14, 2148 (Saros 157)	July 25, 2177 (Saros 158)	
