= Solar eclipse of September 12, 2053 =

Total eclipse

- Total eclipse
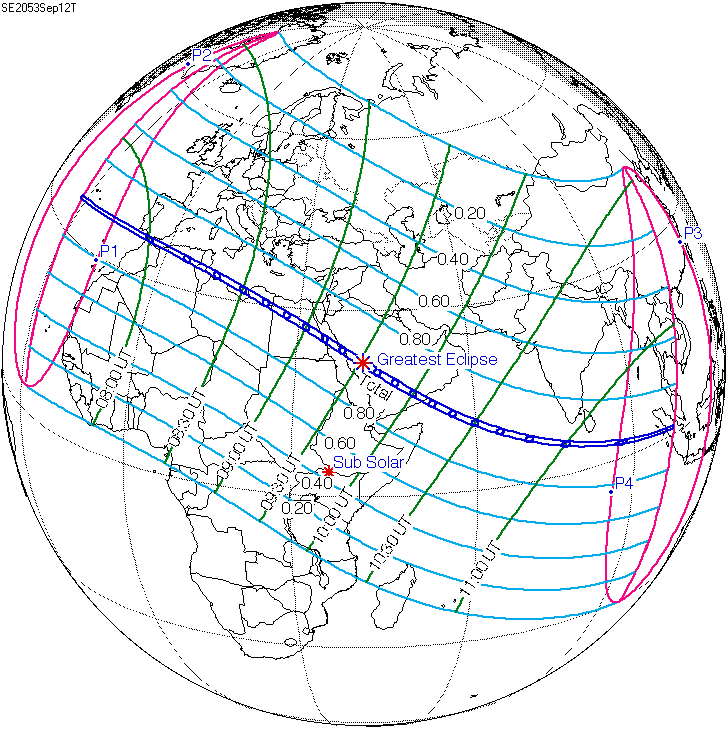
- Map
- Gamma: 0.314
- Magnitude: 1.0328

Maximum eclipse
- Duration: 184 s (3 min 4 s)
- Coordinates: 21.5°N 41.7°E
- Max. width of band: 116 km (72 mi)

Times (UTC)
- Greatest eclipse: 9:34:09

References
- Saros: 145 (24 of 77)
- Catalog # (SE5000): 9626

A total solar eclipse will take place at the Moon's ascending node of orbit on Friday, September 12, 2053, with a magnitude of 1.0328. A solar eclipse occurs when the Moon passes between Earth and the Sun, thereby totally or partly obscuring the image of the Sun for a viewer on Earth. A total solar eclipse occurs when the Moon's apparent diameter is larger than the Sun's, blocking all direct sunlight, turning day into darkness. Totality occurs in a narrow path across Earth's surface, with the partial solar eclipse visible over a surrounding region thousands of kilometres wide. Occurring about 2.7 days after perigee (on September 9, 2053, at 16:30 UTC), the Moon's apparent diameter will be larger.

The path of totality will be visible from parts of the southern tip of Spain, the northern tip of Morocco, Algeria, Tunisia, Libya, Egypt, Saudi Arabia, Yemen, the Maldives, and western Indonesia. This is very similar to, and partially overlaps, the path of totality from the solar eclipse of August 2, 2027. A partial solar eclipse will also be visible for parts of north and central Africa, Europe, the Middle East, Central Asia, South Asia, and Southeast Asia.

== Eclipse details ==
Shown below are two tables displaying details about this particular solar eclipse. The first table outlines times at which the Moon's penumbra or umbra attains the specific parameter, and the second table describes various other parameters pertaining to this eclipse.

September 12, 2053 Solar Eclipse Times
Event	Time (UTC)
First Penumbral External Contact	2053 September 12 at 06:53:11.7 UTC
First Umbral External Contact	2053 September 12 at 07:52:27.5 UTC
First Central Line	2053 September 12 at 07:52:58.0 UTC
First Umbral Internal Contact	2053 September 12 at 07:53:28.5 UTC
First Penumbral Internal Contact	2053 September 12 at 08:58:54.5 UTC
Equatorial Conjunction	2053 September 12 at 09:23:37.4 UTC
Greatest Duration	2053 September 12 at 09:31:22.4 UTC
Greatest Eclipse	2053 September 12 at 09:34:08.9 UTC
Ecliptic Conjunction	2053 September 12 at 09:37:28.8 UTC
Last Penumbral Internal Contact	2053 September 12 at 10:09:39.1 UTC
Last Umbral Internal Contact	2053 September 12 at 11:15:00.1 UTC
Last Central Line	2053 September 12 at 11:15:28.1 UTC
Last Umbral External Contact	2053 September 12 at 11:15:56.0 UTC
Last Penumbral External Contact	2053 September 12 at 12:15:16.4 UTC

September 12, 2053 Solar Eclipse Parameters
Parameter	Value
Eclipse Magnitude	1.03285
Eclipse Obscuration	1.06677
Gamma	0.31396
Sun Right Ascension	11h23m36.1s
Sun Declination	+03°55'14.2"
Sun Semi-Diameter	15'53.4"
Sun Equatorial Horizontal Parallax	08.7"
Moon Right Ascension	11h23m58.5s
Moon Declination	+04°12'57.2"
Moon Semi-Diameter	16'09.4"
Moon Equatorial Horizontal Parallax	0°59'17.8"
ΔT	86.3 s

== Eclipse season ==
This eclipse is part of an eclipse season, a period, roughly every six months, when eclipses occur. Only two (or occasionally three) eclipse seasons occur each year, and each season lasts about 35 days and repeats just short of six months (173 days) later; thus two full eclipse seasons always occur each year. Either two or three eclipses happen each eclipse season. In the sequence below, each eclipse is separated by a fortnight.

Eclipse season of August–September 2053
August 29 Descending node (full moon)	September 12 Ascending node (new moon)
Penumbral lunar eclipse Lunar Saros 119	Total solar eclipse Solar Saros 145

== Related eclipses ==
=== Eclipses in 2053 ===
- A penumbral lunar eclipse on March 4.
- An annular solar eclipse on March 20.
- A penumbral lunar eclipse on August 29.
- A total solar eclipse on September 12.

=== Metonic ===
- Preceded by: Solar eclipse of November 25, 2049
- Followed by: Solar eclipse of July 1, 2057

=== Tzolkinex ===
- Preceded by: Solar eclipse of August 2, 2046
- Followed by: Solar eclipse of October 24, 2060

=== Half-Saros ===
- Preceded by: Lunar eclipse of September 7, 2044
- Followed by: Lunar eclipse of September 18, 2062

=== Tritos ===
- Preceded by: Solar eclipse of October 14, 2042
- Followed by: Solar eclipse of August 12, 2064

=== Solar Saros 145 ===
- Preceded by: Solar eclipse of September 2, 2035
- Followed by: Solar eclipse of September 23, 2071

=== Inex ===
- Preceded by: Solar eclipse of October 2, 2024
- Followed by: Solar eclipse of August 24, 2082

=== Triad ===
- Preceded by: Solar eclipse of November 12, 1966
- Followed by: Solar eclipse of July 14, 2140

=== Solar eclipses of 2051–2054 ===
This eclipse is a member of a semester series. An eclipse in a semester series of solar eclipses repeats approximately every 177 days and 4 hours (a semester) at alternating nodes of the Moon's orbit.

The partial solar eclipse on August 3, 2054 occurs in the next lunar year eclipse set.

Solar eclipse series sets from 2051 to 2054
Descending node			Ascending node		
Saros	Map	Gamma	Saros	Map	Gamma
120	April 11, 2051 Partial	1.0169	125	October 4, 2051 Partial	−1.2094
130	March 30, 2052 Total	0.3238	135	September 22, 2052 Annular	−0.448
140	March 20, 2053 Annular	−0.4089	145	September 12, 2053 Total	0.314
150	March 9, 2054 Partial	−1.1711	155	September 2, 2054 Partial	1.0215

=== Saros 145 ===
This eclipse is a part of Saros series 145, repeating every 18 years, 11 days, and containing 77 events. The series started with a partial solar eclipse on January 4, 1639. It contains an annular eclipse on June 6, 1891; a hybrid eclipse on June 17, 1909; and total eclipses from June 29, 1927 through September 9, 2648. The series ends at member 77 as a partial eclipse on April 17, 3009. Its eclipses are tabulated in three columns; every third eclipse in the same column is one exeligmos apart, so they all cast shadows over approximately the same parts of the Earth.

The longest duration of annularity was produced by member 15 at 6 seconds (by default) on June 6, 1891, and the longest duration of totality will be produced by member 50 at 7 minutes, 12 seconds on June 25, 2522. All eclipses in this series occur at the Moon’s ascending node of orbit.

Series members 10–32 occur between 1801 and 2200:
10	11	12
April 13, 1801	April 24, 1819	May 4, 1837
13	14	15
May 16, 1855	May 26, 1873	June 6, 1891
16	17	18
June 17, 1909	June 29, 1927	July 9, 1945
19	20	21
July 20, 1963	July 31, 1981	August 11, 1999
22	23	24
August 21, 2017	September 2, 2035	September 12, 2053
25	26	27
September 23, 2071	October 4, 2089	October 16, 2107
28	29	30
October 26, 2125	November 7, 2143	November 17, 2161
31	32	
November 28, 2179	December 9, 2197	

=== Metonic series ===
The metonic series repeats eclipses every 19 years (6939.69 days), lasting about 5 cycles. Eclipses occur in nearly the same calendar date. In addition, the octon subseries repeats 1/5 of that or every 3.8 years (1387.94 days). All eclipses in this table occur at the Moon's ascending node.

21 eclipse events between July 1, 2000 and July 1, 2076
July 1–2	April 19–20	February 5–7	November 24–25	September 12–13
117	119	121	123	125
July 1, 2000	April 19, 2004	February 7, 2008	November 25, 2011	September 13, 2015
127	129	131	133	135
July 2, 2019	April 20, 2023	February 6, 2027	November 25, 2030	September 12, 2034
137	139	141	143	145
July 2, 2038	April 20, 2042	February 5, 2046	November 25, 2049	September 12, 2053
147	149	151	153	155
July 1, 2057	April 20, 2061	February 5, 2065	November 24, 2068	September 12, 2072
157
July 1, 2076

=== Tritos series ===
This eclipse is a part of a tritos cycle, repeating at alternating nodes every 135 synodic months (≈ 3986.63 days, or 11 years minus 1 month). Their appearance and longitude are irregular due to a lack of synchronization with the anomalistic month (period of perigee), but groupings of 3 tritos cycles (≈ 33 years minus 3 months) come close (≈ 434.044 anomalistic months), so eclipses are similar in these groupings.

Series members between 1801 and 2200
August 28, 1802 (Saros 122)	July 27, 1813 (Saros 123)	June 26, 1824 (Saros 124)	May 27, 1835 (Saros 125)	April 25, 1846 (Saros 126)
March 25, 1857 (Saros 127)	February 23, 1868 (Saros 128)	January 22, 1879 (Saros 129)	December 22, 1889 (Saros 130)	November 22, 1900 (Saros 131)
October 22, 1911 (Saros 132)	September 21, 1922 (Saros 133)	August 21, 1933 (Saros 134)	July 20, 1944 (Saros 135)	June 20, 1955 (Saros 136)
May 20, 1966 (Saros 137)	April 18, 1977 (Saros 138)	March 18, 1988 (Saros 139)	February 16, 1999 (Saros 140)	January 15, 2010 (Saros 141)
December 14, 2020 (Saros 142)	November 14, 2031 (Saros 143)	October 14, 2042 (Saros 144)	September 12, 2053 (Saros 145)	August 12, 2064 (Saros 146)
July 13, 2075 (Saros 147)	June 11, 2086 (Saros 148)	May 11, 2097 (Saros 149)	April 11, 2108 (Saros 150)	March 11, 2119 (Saros 151)
February 8, 2130 (Saros 152)	January 8, 2141 (Saros 153)	December 8, 2151 (Saros 154)	November 7, 2162 (Saros 155)	October 7, 2173 (Saros 156)
September 4, 2184 (Saros 157)	August 5, 2195 (Saros 158)			

=== Inex series ===
This eclipse is a part of the long period inex cycle, repeating at alternating nodes, every 358 synodic months (≈ 10,571.95 days, or 29 years minus 20 days). Their appearance and longitude are irregular due to a lack of synchronization with the anomalistic month (period of perigee). However, groupings of 3 inex cycles (≈ 87 years minus 2 months) comes close (≈ 1,151.02 anomalistic months), so eclipses are similar in these groupings.

Series members between 1801 and 2200
February 21, 1822 (Saros 137)	February 1, 1851 (Saros 138)	January 11, 1880 (Saros 139)
December 23, 1908 (Saros 140)	December 2, 1937 (Saros 141)	November 12, 1966 (Saros 142)
October 24, 1995 (Saros 143)	October 2, 2024 (Saros 144)	September 12, 2053 (Saros 145)
August 24, 2082 (Saros 146)	August 4, 2111 (Saros 147)	July 14, 2140 (Saros 148)
June 25, 2169 (Saros 149)	June 4, 2198 (Saros 150)	
