= Solar eclipse of May 19, 1985 =

20th-century partial solar eclipse

- Partial eclipse
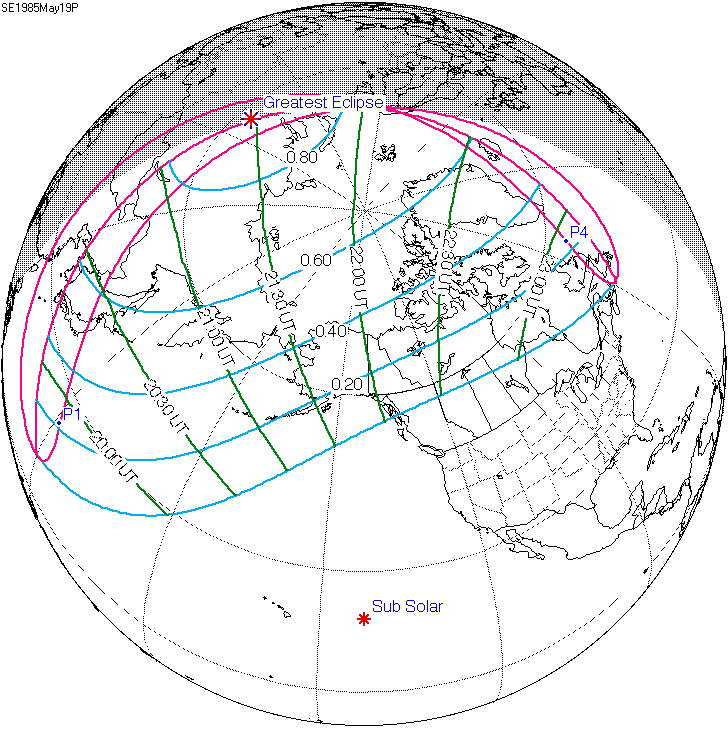
- Map
- Gamma: 1.072
- Magnitude: 0.8406

Maximum eclipse
- Coordinates: 63.2°N 81.1°E

Times (UTC)
- Greatest eclipse: 21:29:38

References
- Saros: 147 (21 of 80)
- Catalog # (SE5000): 9476

A partial solar eclipse occurred at the Moon's ascending node of orbit between Sunday, May 19 and Monday, May 20, 1985, with a magnitude of 0.8406. A solar eclipse occurs when the Moon passes between Earth and the Sun, thereby totally or partly obscuring the image of the Sun for a viewer on Earth. A partial solar eclipse occurs in the polar regions of the Earth when the center of the Moon's shadow misses the Earth.

A partial eclipse was visible near sunrise on May 20 over Japan and northeast Russia and ended on May 19 over Alaska and near sunset over northern Canada and Greenland.

== Eclipse details ==
Shown below are two tables displaying details about this particular solar eclipse. The first table outlines times at which the Moon's penumbra or umbra attains the specific parameter, and the second table describes various other parameters pertaining to this eclipse.

May 19, 1985 Solar Eclipse Times
Event	Time (UTC)
First Penumbral External Contact	1985 May 19 at 19:15:42.2 UTC
Greatest Eclipse	1985 May 19 at 21:29:37.8 UTC
Ecliptic Conjunction	1985 May 19 at 21:42:01.7 UTC
Equatorial Conjunction	1985 May 19 at 22:11:12.4 UTC
Last Penumbral External Contact	1985 May 19 at 23:43:13.0 UTC

May 19, 1985 Solar Eclipse Parameters
Parameter	Value
Eclipse Magnitude	0.84064
Eclipse Obscuration	0.77714
Gamma	1.07197
Sun Right Ascension	03h46m23.8s
Sun Declination	+19°54'02.6"
Sun Semi-Diameter	15'48.3"
Sun Equatorial Horizontal Parallax	08.7"
Moon Right Ascension	03h45m05.8s
Moon Declination	+20°49'15.8"
Moon Semi-Diameter	14'49.5"
Moon Equatorial Horizontal Parallax	0°54'24.6"
ΔT	54.5 s

== Eclipse season ==
This eclipse is part of an eclipse season, a period, roughly every six months, when eclipses occur. Only two (or occasionally three) eclipse seasons occur each year, and each season lasts about 35 days and repeats just short of six months (173 days) later; thus two full eclipse seasons always occur each year. Either two or three eclipses happen each eclipse season. In the sequence below, each eclipse is separated by a fortnight.

Eclipse season of May 1985
May 4 Descending node (full moon)	May 19 Ascending node (new moon)
Total lunar eclipse Lunar Saros 121	Partial solar eclipse Solar Saros 147

== Related eclipses ==
=== Eclipses in 1985 ===
- A total lunar eclipse on May 4.
- A partial solar eclipse on May 19.
- A total lunar eclipse on October 28.
- A total solar eclipse on November 12.

=== Metonic ===
- Preceded by: Solar eclipse of July 31, 1981
- Followed by: Solar eclipse of March 7, 1989

=== Tzolkinex ===
- Preceded by: Solar eclipse of April 7, 1978
- Followed by: Solar eclipse of June 30, 1992

=== Half-Saros ===
- Preceded by: Lunar eclipse of May 13, 1976
- Followed by: Lunar eclipse of May 25, 1994

=== Tritos ===
- Preceded by: Solar eclipse of June 20, 1974
- Followed by: Solar eclipse of April 17, 1996

=== Solar Saros 147 ===
- Preceded by: Solar eclipse of May 9, 1967
- Followed by: Solar eclipse of May 31, 2003

=== Inex ===
- Preceded by: Solar eclipse of June 8, 1956
- Followed by: Solar eclipse of April 29, 2014

=== Triad ===
- Preceded by: Solar eclipse of July 18, 1898
- Followed by: Solar eclipse of March 19, 2072

=== Solar eclipses of 1982–1985 ===
This eclipse is a member of a semester series. An eclipse in a semester series of solar eclipses repeats approximately every 177 days and 4 hours (a semester) at alternating nodes of the Moon's orbit.

The partial solar eclipses on January 25, 1982 and July 20, 1982 occur in the previous lunar year eclipse set.

Solar eclipse series sets from 1982 to 1985
Ascending node			Descending node		
Saros	Map	Gamma	Saros	Map	Gamma
117	June 21, 1982 Partial	−1.2102	122	December 15, 1982 Partial	1.1293
127	June 11, 1983 Total	−0.4947	132	December 4, 1983 Annular	0.4015
137	May 30, 1984 Annular	0.2755	142 Partial in Gisborne, New Zealand	November 22, 1984 Total	−0.3132
147	May 19, 1985 Partial	1.072	152	November 12, 1985 Total	−0.9795

=== Saros 147 ===
This eclipse is a part of Saros series 147, repeating every 18 years, 11 days, and containing 80 events. The series started with a partial solar eclipse on October 12, 1624. It contains annular eclipses from May 31, 2003 through July 31, 2706. There are no hybrid or total eclipses in this set. The series ends at member 80 as a partial eclipse on February 24, 3049. Its eclipses are tabulated in three columns; every third eclipse in the same column is one exeligmos apart, so they all cast shadows over approximately the same parts of the Earth.

The longest duration of annularity will be produced by member 38 at 9 minutes, 41 seconds on November 21, 2291. All eclipses in this series occur at the Moon’s ascending node of orbit.

Series members 11–32 occur between 1801 and 2200:
11	12	13
January 30, 1805	February 11, 1823	February 21, 1841
14	15	16
March 4, 1859	March 15, 1877	March 26, 1895
17	18	19
April 6, 1913	April 18, 1931	April 28, 1949
20	21	22
May 9, 1967	May 19, 1985	May 31, 2003
23	24	25
June 10, 2021	June 21, 2039	July 1, 2057
26	27	28
July 13, 2075	July 23, 2093	August 4, 2111
29	30	31
August 15, 2129	August 26, 2147	September 5, 2165
32
September 16, 2183

=== Metonic series ===
The metonic series repeats eclipses every 19 years (6939.69 days), lasting about 5 cycles. Eclipses occur in nearly the same calendar date. In addition, the octon subseries repeats 1/5 of that or every 3.8 years (1387.94 days). All eclipses in this table occur at the Moon's ascending node.

22 eclipse events between December 24, 1916 and July 31, 2000
December 24–25	October 12	July 31–August 1	May 19–20	March 7
111	113	115	117	119
December 24, 1916		July 31, 1924	May 19, 1928	March 7, 1932
121	123	125	127	129
December 25, 1935	October 12, 1939	August 1, 1943	May 20, 1947	March 7, 1951
131	133	135	137	139
December 25, 1954	October 12, 1958	July 31, 1962	May 20, 1966	March 7, 1970
141	143	145	147	149
December 24, 1973	October 12, 1977	July 31, 1981	May 19, 1985	March 7, 1989
151	153	155		
December 24, 1992	October 12, 1996	July 31, 2000		

=== Tritos series ===
This eclipse is a part of a tritos cycle, repeating at alternating nodes every 135 synodic months (≈ 3986.63 days, or 11 years minus 1 month). Their appearance and longitude are irregular due to a lack of synchronization with the anomalistic month (period of perigee), but groupings of 3 tritos cycles (≈ 33 years minus 3 months) come close (≈ 434.044 anomalistic months), so eclipses are similar in these groupings.

The partial solar eclipses on December 7, 2170 (part of Saros 164) and November 7, 2181 (part of Saros 165) are also a part of this series but are not included in the table below.

Series members between 1801 and 2105
September 28, 1810 (Saros 131)	August 27, 1821 (Saros 132)	July 27, 1832 (Saros 133)	June 27, 1843 (Saros 134)	May 26, 1854 (Saros 135)
April 25, 1865 (Saros 136)	March 25, 1876 (Saros 137)	February 22, 1887 (Saros 138)	January 22, 1898 (Saros 139)	December 23, 1908 (Saros 140)
November 22, 1919 (Saros 141)	October 21, 1930 (Saros 142)	September 21, 1941 (Saros 143)	August 20, 1952 (Saros 144)	July 20, 1963 (Saros 145)
June 20, 1974 (Saros 146)	May 19, 1985 (Saros 147)	April 17, 1996 (Saros 148)	March 19, 2007 (Saros 149)	February 15, 2018 (Saros 150)
January 14, 2029 (Saros 151)	December 15, 2039 (Saros 152)	November 14, 2050 (Saros 153)	October 13, 2061 (Saros 154)	September 12, 2072 (Saros 155)
August 13, 2083 (Saros 156)	July 12, 2094 (Saros 157)	June 12, 2105 (Saros 158)		

=== Inex series ===
This eclipse is a part of the long period inex cycle, repeating at alternating nodes, every 358 synodic months (≈ 10,571.95 days, or 29 years minus 20 days). Their appearance and longitude are irregular due to a lack of synchronization with the anomalistic month (period of perigee). However, groupings of 3 inex cycles (≈ 87 years minus 2 months) comes close (≈ 1,151.02 anomalistic months), so eclipses are similar in these groupings.

Series members between 1801 and 2200
September 17, 1811 (Saros 141)	August 27, 1840 (Saros 142)	August 7, 1869 (Saros 143)
July 18, 1898 (Saros 144)	June 29, 1927 (Saros 145)	June 8, 1956 (Saros 146)
May 19, 1985 (Saros 147)	April 29, 2014 (Saros 148)	April 9, 2043 (Saros 149)
March 19, 2072 (Saros 150)	February 28, 2101 (Saros 151)	February 8, 2130 (Saros 152)
January 19, 2159 (Saros 153)	December 29, 2187 (Saros 154)	
