= Solar eclipse of September 12, 2072 =

Total eclipse

- Total eclipse
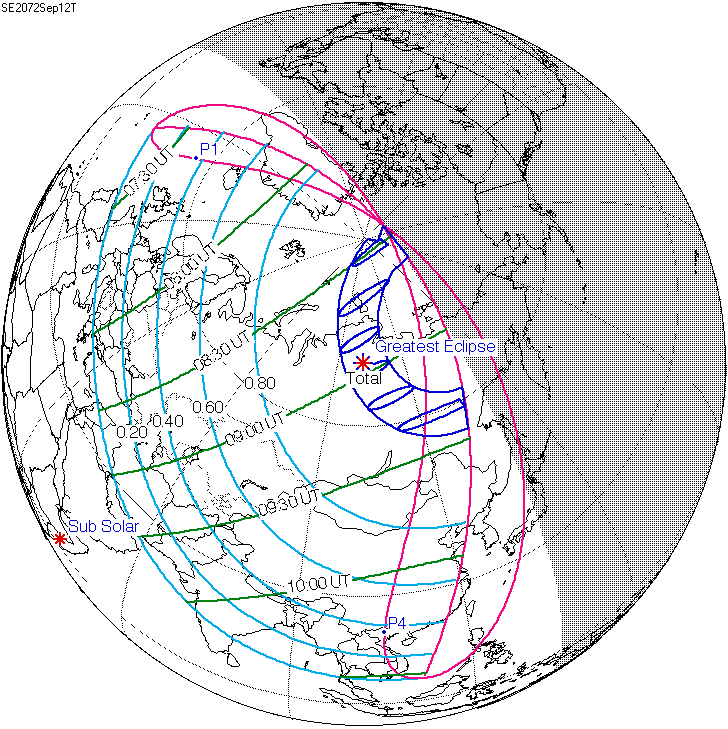
- Map
- Gamma: 0.9655
- Magnitude: 1.0558

Maximum eclipse
- Duration: 193 s (3 min 13 s)
- Coordinates: 69.8°N 102°E
- Max. width of band: 732 km (455 mi)

Times (UTC)
- Greatest eclipse: 8:59:20

References
- Saros: 155 (9 of 71)
- Catalog # (SE5000): 9670

A total solar eclipse will occur at the Moon's ascending node of orbit on Monday, September 12, 2072, with a magnitude of 1.0558. A solar eclipse occurs when the Moon passes between Earth and the Sun, thereby totally or partly obscuring the image of the Sun for a viewer on Earth. A total solar eclipse occurs when the Moon's apparent diameter is larger than the Sun's, blocking all direct sunlight, turning day into darkness. Totality occurs in a narrow path across Earth's surface, with the partial solar eclipse visible over a surrounding region thousands of kilometres wide. Occurring about 7 hours before perigee (on September 12, 2072, at 2:15 UTC), the Moon's apparent diameter will be larger.

The path of totality will be visible from much of northern and eastern Russia. A partial solar eclipse will also be visible for parts of Greenland, Europe, and Asia. This is the first of 56 umbral eclipses in Solar Saros 155.

The total phase of eclipse will be only in Siberia in Russia. Large cities, in which the total phase will be seen, include Yakutsk, Neryungri, Mirny in Sakha Republic and Khatanga in Krasnoyarsk Krai (also Norilsk will have 98% sun obscuration).

== Eclipse details ==
Shown below are two tables displaying details about this particular solar eclipse. The first table outlines times at which the Moon's penumbra or umbra attains the specific parameter, and the second table describes various other parameters pertaining to this eclipse.

September 12, 2072 Solar Eclipse Times
Event	Time (UTC)
First Penumbral External Contact	2072 September 12 at 06:57:11.7 UTC
First Umbral External Contact	2072 September 12 at 08:28:51.8 UTC
First Central Line	2072 September 12 at 08:33:54.4 UTC
First Umbral Internal Contact	2072 September 12 at 08:40:07.5 UTC
Equatorial Conjunction	2072 September 12 at 08:27:52.7 UTC
Greatest Eclipse	2072 September 12 at 08:59:20.2 UTC
Greatest Duration	2072 September 12 at 08:59:24.9 UTC
Ecliptic Conjunction	2072 September 12 at 09:09:00.3 UTC
Last Umbral Internal Contact	2072 September 12 at 09:18:56.8 UTC
Last Central Line	2072 September 12 at 09:25:09.1 UTC
Last Umbral External Contact	2072 September 12 at 09:30:10.9 UTC
Last Penumbral External Contact	2072 September 12 at 11:01:44.6 UTC

September 12, 2072 Solar Eclipse Parameters
Parameter	Value
Eclipse Magnitude	1.05578
Eclipse Obscuration	1.11466
Gamma	0.96552
Sun Right Ascension	11h24m57.8s
Sun Declination	+03°46'31.0"
Sun Semi-Diameter	15'53.4"
Sun Equatorial Horizontal Parallax	08.7"
Moon Right Ascension	11h26m09.4s
Moon Declination	+04°42'50.2"
Moon Semi-Diameter	16'42.8"
Moon Equatorial Horizontal Parallax	1°01'20.3"
ΔT	99.6 s

== Eclipse season ==
This eclipse is part of an eclipse season, a period, roughly every six months, when eclipses occur. Only two (or occasionally three) eclipse seasons occur each year, and each season lasts about 35 days and repeats just short of six months (173 days) later; thus two full eclipse seasons always occur each year. Either two or three eclipses happen each eclipse season. In the sequence below, each eclipse is separated by a fortnight.

Eclipse season of August–September 2072
August 28 Descending node (full moon)	September 12 Ascending node (new moon)
Total lunar eclipse Lunar Saros 129	Total solar eclipse Solar Saros 155

== Related eclipses ==
=== Eclipses in 2072 ===
- A total lunar eclipse on March 4.
- A partial solar eclipse on March 19.
- A total lunar eclipse on August 28.
- A total solar eclipse on September 12.

=== Metonic ===
- Preceded by: Solar eclipse of November 24, 2068
- Followed by: Solar eclipse of July 1, 2076

=== Tzolkinex ===
- Preceded by: Solar eclipse of August 2, 2065
- Followed by: Solar eclipse of October 24, 2079

=== Half-Saros ===
- Preceded by: Lunar eclipse of September 7, 2063
- Followed by: Lunar eclipse of September 18, 2081

=== Tritos ===
- Preceded by: Solar eclipse of October 13, 2061
- Followed by: Solar eclipse of August 13, 2083

=== Solar Saros 155 ===
- Preceded by: Solar eclipse of September 2, 2054
- Followed by: Solar eclipse of September 23, 2090

=== Inex ===
- Preceded by: Solar eclipse of October 3, 2043
- Followed by: Solar eclipse of August 24, 2101

=== Triad ===
- Preceded by: Solar eclipse of November 12, 1985
- Followed by: Solar eclipse of July 15, 2159

=== Solar eclipses of 2069–2072 ===
This eclipse is a member of a semester series. An eclipse in a semester series of solar eclipses repeats approximately every 177 days and 4 hours (a semester) at alternating nodes of the Moon's orbit.

The partial solar eclipse on May 20, 2069 occurs in the previous lunar year eclipse set.

Solar eclipse series sets from 2069 to 2072
Descending node			Ascending node		
Saros	Map	Gamma	Saros	Map	Gamma
120	April 21, 2069 Partial	1.0624	125	October 15, 2069 Partial	−1.2524
130	April 11, 2070 Total	0.3652	135	October 4, 2070 Annular	−0.495
140	March 31, 2071 Annular	−0.3739	145	September 23, 2071 Total	0.262
150	March 19, 2072 Partial	−1.1405	155	September 12, 2072 Total	0.9655

=== Saros 155 ===
This eclipse is a part of Saros series 155, repeating every 18 years, 11 days, and containing 71 events. The series started with a partial solar eclipse on June 17, 1928. It contains total eclipses from September 12, 2072 through August 30, 2649; hybrid eclipses from September 10, 2667 through October 2, 2703; and annular eclipses from October 13, 2721 through May 8, 3064. The series ends at member 71 as a partial eclipse on July 24, 3190. Its eclipses are tabulated in three columns; every third eclipse in the same column is one exeligmos apart, so they all cast shadows over approximately the same parts of the Earth.

The longest duration of totality will be produced by member 14 at 4 minutes, 5 seconds on November 6, 2162, and the longest duration of annularity will be produced by member 63 at 5 minutes, 31 seconds on April 28, 3046. All eclipses in this series occur at the Moon’s ascending node of orbit.

Series members 1–16 occur between 1928 and 2200:
1	2	3
June 17, 1928	June 29, 1946	July 9, 1964
4	5	6
July 20, 1982	July 31, 2000	August 11, 2018
7	8	9
August 21, 2036	September 2, 2054	September 12, 2072
10	11	12
September 23, 2090	October 5, 2108	October 16, 2126
13	14	15
October 26, 2144	November 7, 2162	November 17, 2180
16
November 28, 2198

=== Metonic series ===
The metonic series repeats eclipses every 19 years (6939.69 days), lasting about 5 cycles. Eclipses occur in nearly the same calendar date. In addition, the octon subseries repeats 1/5 of that or every 3.8 years (1387.94 days). All eclipses in this table occur at the Moon's ascending node.

21 eclipse events between July 1, 2000 and July 1, 2076
July 1–2	April 19–20	February 5–7	November 24–25	September 12–13
117	119	121	123	125
July 1, 2000	April 19, 2004	February 7, 2008	November 25, 2011	September 13, 2015
127	129	131	133	135
July 2, 2019	April 20, 2023	February 6, 2027	November 25, 2030	September 12, 2034
137	139	141	143	145
July 2, 2038	April 20, 2042	February 5, 2046	November 25, 2049	September 12, 2053
147	149	151	153	155
July 1, 2057	April 20, 2061	February 5, 2065	November 24, 2068	September 12, 2072
157
July 1, 2076

=== Tritos series ===
This eclipse is a part of a tritos cycle, repeating at alternating nodes every 135 synodic months (≈ 3986.63 days, or 11 years minus 1 month). Their appearance and longitude are irregular due to a lack of synchronization with the anomalistic month (period of perigee), but groupings of 3 tritos cycles (≈ 33 years minus 3 months) come close (≈ 434.044 anomalistic months), so eclipses are similar in these groupings.

The partial solar eclipses on December 7, 2170 (part of Saros 164) and November 7, 2181 (part of Saros 165) are also a part of this series but are not included in the table below.

Series members between 1801 and 2105
September 28, 1810 (Saros 131)	August 27, 1821 (Saros 132)	July 27, 1832 (Saros 133)	June 27, 1843 (Saros 134)	May 26, 1854 (Saros 135)
April 25, 1865 (Saros 136)	March 25, 1876 (Saros 137)	February 22, 1887 (Saros 138)	January 22, 1898 (Saros 139)	December 23, 1908 (Saros 140)
November 22, 1919 (Saros 141)	October 21, 1930 (Saros 142)	September 21, 1941 (Saros 143)	August 20, 1952 (Saros 144)	July 20, 1963 (Saros 145)
June 20, 1974 (Saros 146)	May 19, 1985 (Saros 147)	April 17, 1996 (Saros 148)	March 19, 2007 (Saros 149)	February 15, 2018 (Saros 150)
January 14, 2029 (Saros 151)	December 15, 2039 (Saros 152)	November 14, 2050 (Saros 153)	October 13, 2061 (Saros 154)	September 12, 2072 (Saros 155)
August 13, 2083 (Saros 156)	July 12, 2094 (Saros 157)	June 12, 2105 (Saros 158)		

=== Inex series ===
This eclipse is a part of the long period inex cycle, repeating at alternating nodes, every 358 synodic months (≈ 10,571.95 days, or 29 years minus 20 days). Their appearance and longitude are irregular due to a lack of synchronization with the anomalistic month (period of perigee). However, groupings of 3 inex cycles (≈ 87 years minus 2 months) comes close (≈ 1,151.02 anomalistic months), so eclipses are similar in these groupings.

Series members between 1801 and 2200
March 13, 1812 (Saros 146)	February 21, 1841 (Saros 147)	January 31, 1870 (Saros 148)
January 11, 1899 (Saros 149)	December 24, 1927 (Saros 150)	December 2, 1956 (Saros 151)
November 12, 1985 (Saros 152)	October 23, 2014 (Saros 153)	October 3, 2043 (Saros 154)
September 12, 2072 (Saros 155)	August 24, 2101 (Saros 156)	August 4, 2130 (Saros 157)
July 15, 2159 (Saros 158)	June 24, 2188 (Saros 159)	
