= Solar eclipse of March 19, 2072 =

Future partial solar eclipse

- Partial eclipse
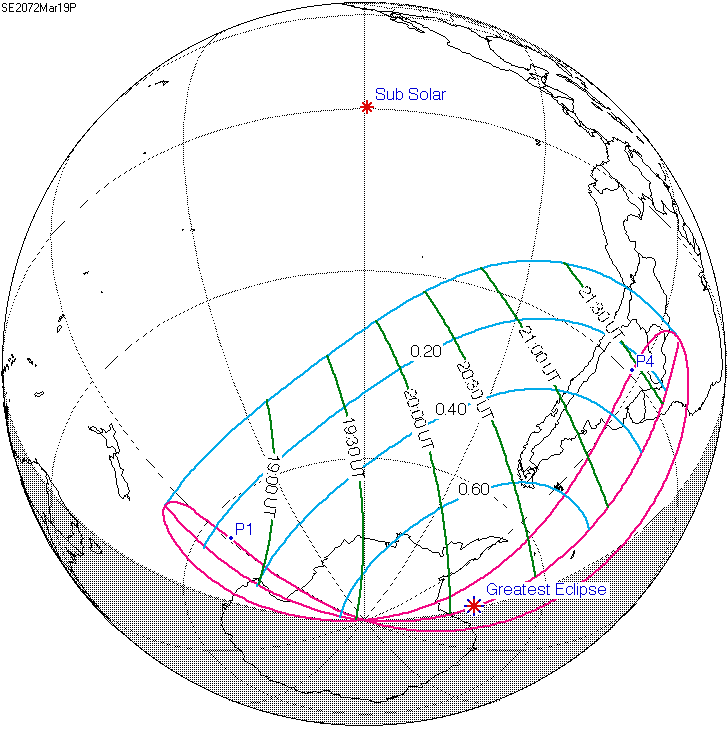
- Map
- Gamma: −1.1405
- Magnitude: 0.7199

Maximum eclipse
- Coordinates: 72.2°S 30.4°W

Times (UTC)
- Greatest eclipse: 20:10:31

References
- Saros: 150 (20 of 71)
- Catalog # (SE5000): 9669

A partial solar eclipse will occur at the Moon's descending node of orbit on Saturday, March 19, 2072, with a magnitude of 0.7199. A solar eclipse occurs when the Moon passes between Earth and the Sun, thereby totally or partly obscuring the image of the Sun for a viewer on Earth. A partial solar eclipse occurs in the polar regions of the Earth when the center of the Moon's shadow misses the Earth.

The partial solar eclipse will be visible for parts of Antarctica and southern South America.

== Eclipse details ==
Shown below are two tables displaying details about this particular solar eclipse. The first table outlines times at which the Moon's penumbra or umbra attains the specific parameter, and the second table describes various other parameters pertaining to this eclipse.

March 19, 2072 Solar Eclipse Times
| Event | Time (UTC) |
|---|---|
| First Penumbral External Contact | 2072 March 19 at 18:04:52.6 UTC |
| Equatorial Conjunction | 2072 March 19 at 19:27:34.2 UTC |
| Greatest Eclipse | 2072 March 19 at 20:10:31.1 UTC |
| Ecliptic Conjunction | 2072 March 19 at 20:23:39.2 UTC |
| Last Penumbral External Contact | 2072 March 19 at 22:16:25.5 UTC |

March 19, 2072 Solar Eclipse Parameters
| Parameter | Value |
|---|---|
| Eclipse Magnitude | 0.71994 |
| Eclipse Obscuration | 0.63063 |
| Gamma | −1.14049 |
| Sun Right Ascension | 00h00m16.3s |
| Sun Declination | +00°01'46.1" |
| Sun Semi-Diameter | 16'03.7" |
| Sun Equatorial Horizontal Parallax | 08.8" |
| Moon Right Ascension | 00h01m32.5s |
| Moon Declination | -00°57'26.5" |
| Moon Semi-Diameter | 14'53.9" |
| Moon Equatorial Horizontal Parallax | 0°54'40.7" |
| ΔT | 99.2 s |

== Eclipse season ==
This eclipse is part of an eclipse season, a period, roughly every six months, when eclipses occur. Only two (or occasionally three) eclipse seasons occur each year, and each season lasts about 35 days and repeats just short of six months (173 days) later; thus two full eclipse seasons always occur each year. Either two or three eclipses happen each eclipse season. In the sequence below, each eclipse is separated by a fortnight.

Eclipse season of March 2072
| March 4 Ascending node (full moon) | March 19 Descending node (new moon) |
|---|---|
| Total lunar eclipse Lunar Saros 124 | Partial solar eclipse Solar Saros 150 |

== Related eclipses ==
=== Eclipses in 2072 ===
- A total lunar eclipse on March 4.
- A partial solar eclipse on March 19.
- A total lunar eclipse on August 28.
- A total solar eclipse on September 12.

=== Metonic ===
- Preceded by: Solar eclipse of May 31, 2068
- Followed by: Solar eclipse of January 6, 2076

=== Tzolkinex ===
- Preceded by: Solar eclipse of February 5, 2065
- Followed by: Solar eclipse of May 1, 2079

=== Half-Saros ===
- Preceded by: Lunar eclipse of March 14, 2063
- Followed by: Lunar eclipse of March 25, 2081

=== Tritos ===
- Preceded by: Solar eclipse of April 20, 2061
- Followed by: Solar eclipse of February 16, 2083

=== Solar Saros 150 ===
- Preceded by: Solar eclipse of March 9, 2054
- Followed by: Solar eclipse of March 31, 2090

=== Inex ===
- Preceded by: Solar eclipse of April 9, 2043
- Followed by: Solar eclipse of February 28, 2101

=== Triad ===
- Preceded by: Solar eclipse of May 19, 1985
- Followed by: Solar eclipse of January 19, 2159

=== Solar eclipses of 2069–2072 ===
This eclipse is a member of a semester series. An eclipse in a semester series of solar eclipses repeats approximately every 177 days and 4 hours (a semester) at alternating nodes of the Moon's orbit.

The partial solar eclipse on May 20, 2069 occurs in the previous lunar year eclipse set.

Solar eclipse series sets from 2069 to 2072
| Descending node | | | Ascending node | | |
| Saros | Map | Gamma | Saros | Map | Gamma |
| 120 | April 21, 2069 Partial | 1.0624 | 125 | October 15, 2069 Partial | −1.2524 |
| 130 | April 11, 2070 Total | 0.3652 | 135 | October 4, 2070 Annular | −0.495 |
| 140 | March 31, 2071 Annular | −0.3739 | 145 | September 23, 2071 Total | 0.262 |
| 150 | March 19, 2072 Partial | −1.1405 | 155 | September 12, 2072 Total | 0.9655 |

=== Saros 150 ===
This eclipse is a part of Saros series 150, repeating every 18 years, 11 days, and containing 71 events. The series started with a partial solar eclipse on August 24, 1729. It contains annular eclipses from April 22, 2126 through June 22, 2829. There are no hybrid or total eclipses in this set. The series ends at member 71 as a partial eclipse on September 29, 2991. Its eclipses are tabulated in three columns; every third eclipse in the same column is one exeligmos apart, so they all cast shadows over approximately the same parts of the Earth.

The longest duration of annularity will be produced by member 45 at 9 minutes, 58 seconds on December 19, 2522. All eclipses in this series occur at the Moon’s descending node of orbit.

Series members 5–27 occur between 1801 and 2200:
| 5 | 6 | 7 |
|---|---|---|
| October 7, 1801 | October 19, 1819 | October 29, 1837 |
| 8 | 9 | 10 |
| November 9, 1855 | November 20, 1873 | December 1, 1891 |
| 11 | 12 | 13 |
| December 12, 1909 | December 24, 1927 | January 3, 1946 |
| 14 | 15 | 16 |
| January 14, 1964 | January 25, 1982 | February 5, 2000 |
| 17 | 18 | 19 |
| February 15, 2018 | February 27, 2036 | March 9, 2054 |
| 20 | 21 | 22 |
| March 19, 2072 | March 31, 2090 | April 11, 2108 |
| 23 | 24 | 25 |
| April 22, 2126 | May 3, 2144 | May 14, 2162 |
| 26 | 27 | |
| May 24, 2180 | June 4, 2198 | |

=== Metonic series ===
The metonic series repeats eclipses every 19 years (6939.69 days), lasting about 5 cycles. Eclipses occur in nearly the same calendar date. In addition, the octon subseries repeats 1/5 of that or every 3.8 years (1387.94 days). All eclipses in this table occur at the Moon's descending node.

22 eclipse events between June 1, 2011 and October 24, 2098
| May 31–June 1 | March 19–20 | January 5–6 | October 24–25 | August 12–13 |
| 118 | 120 | 122 | 124 | 126 |
|---|---|---|---|---|
| June 1, 2011 | March 20, 2015 | January 6, 2019 | October 25, 2022 | August 12, 2026 |
| 128 | 130 | 132 | 134 | 136 |
| June 1, 2030 | March 20, 2034 | January 5, 2038 | October 25, 2041 | August 12, 2045 |
| 138 | 140 | 142 | 144 | 146 |
| May 31, 2049 | March 20, 2053 | January 5, 2057 | October 24, 2060 | August 12, 2064 |
| 148 | 150 | 152 | 154 | 156 |
| May 31, 2068 | March 19, 2072 | January 6, 2076 | October 24, 2079 | August 13, 2083 |
| 158 | 160 | 162 | 164 | |
| June 1, 2087 | | | October 24, 2098 | |

=== Tritos series ===
This eclipse is a part of a tritos cycle, repeating at alternating nodes every 135 synodic months (≈ 3986.63 days, or 11 years minus 1 month). Their appearance and longitude are irregular due to a lack of synchronization with the anomalistic month (period of perigee), but groupings of 3 tritos cycles (≈ 33 years minus 3 months) come close (≈ 434.044 anomalistic months), so eclipses are similar in these groupings.

Series members between 1801 and 2200
| April 4, 1810 (Saros 126) | March 4, 1821 (Saros 127) | February 1, 1832 (Saros 128) | December 31, 1842 (Saros 129) | November 30, 1853 (Saros 130) |
| October 30, 1864 (Saros 131) | September 29, 1875 (Saros 132) | August 29, 1886 (Saros 133) | July 29, 1897 (Saros 134) | June 28, 1908 (Saros 135) |
| May 29, 1919 (Saros 136) | April 28, 1930 (Saros 137) | March 27, 1941 (Saros 138) | February 25, 1952 (Saros 139) | January 25, 1963 (Saros 140) |
| December 24, 1973 (Saros 141) | November 22, 1984 (Saros 142) | October 24, 1995 (Saros 143) | September 22, 2006 (Saros 144) | August 21, 2017 (Saros 145) |
| July 22, 2028 (Saros 146) | June 21, 2039 (Saros 147) | May 20, 2050 (Saros 148) | April 20, 2061 (Saros 149) | March 19, 2072 (Saros 150) |
| February 16, 2083 (Saros 151) | January 16, 2094 (Saros 152) | December 17, 2104 (Saros 153) | November 16, 2115 (Saros 154) | October 16, 2126 (Saros 155) |
| September 15, 2137 (Saros 156) | August 14, 2148 (Saros 157) | July 15, 2159 (Saros 158) | June 14, 2170 (Saros 159) | May 13, 2181 (Saros 160) |
April 12, 2192 (Saros 161)

=== Inex series ===
This eclipse is a part of the long period inex cycle, repeating at alternating nodes, every 358 synodic months (≈ 10,571.95 days, or 29 years minus 20 days). Their appearance and longitude are irregular due to a lack of synchronization with the anomalistic month (period of perigee). However, groupings of 3 inex cycles (≈ 87 years minus 2 months) comes close (≈ 1,151.02 anomalistic months), so eclipses are similar in these groupings.

Series members between 1801 and 2200
| September 17, 1811 (Saros 141) | August 27, 1840 (Saros 142) | August 7, 1869 (Saros 143) |
| July 18, 1898 (Saros 144) | June 29, 1927 (Saros 145) | June 8, 1956 (Saros 146) |
| May 19, 1985 (Saros 147) | April 29, 2014 (Saros 148) | April 9, 2043 (Saros 149) |
| March 19, 2072 (Saros 150) | February 28, 2101 (Saros 151) | February 8, 2130 (Saros 152) |
| January 19, 2159 (Saros 153) | December 29, 2187 (Saros 154) | |
