= Solar eclipse of July 13, 2075 =

Future annular solar eclipse

- Annular eclipse
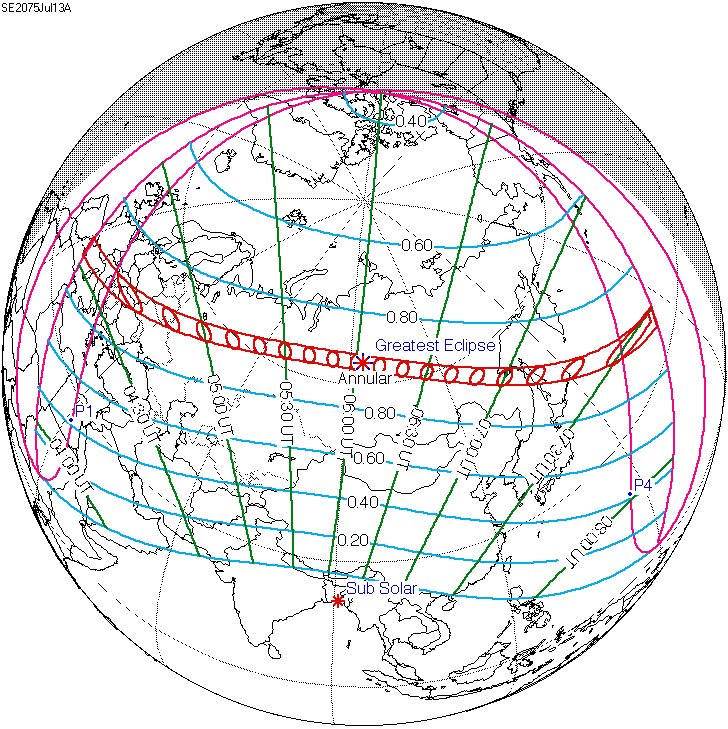
- Map
- Gamma: 0.6583
- Magnitude: 0.9467

Maximum eclipse
- Duration: 285 s (4 min 45 s)
- Coordinates: 63.1°N 95.2°E
- Max. width of band: 262 km (163 mi)

Times (UTC)
- Greatest eclipse: 6:05:44

References
- Saros: 147 (26 of 80)
- Catalog # (SE5000): 9676

An annular solar eclipse will occur at the Moon's ascending node of orbit on Saturday, July 13, 2075, with a magnitude of 0.9467. A solar eclipse occurs when the Moon passes between Earth and the Sun, thereby totally or partly obscuring the image of the Sun for a viewer on Earth. An annular solar eclipse occurs when the Moon's apparent diameter is smaller than the Sun's, blocking most of the Sun's light and causing the Sun to look like an annulus (ring). An annular eclipse appears as a partial eclipse over a region of the Earth thousands of kilometres wide. Occurring about 1.4 days after apogee (on July 11, 2075, at 20:20 UTC), the Moon's apparent diameter will be smaller.

The path of annularity will be visible from parts of eastern Spain, southern France, Monaco, Italy, San Marino, Austria, Slovenia, Croatia, northwestern Bosnia and Herzegovina, Hungary, Slovakia, southwestern Czech Republic, extreme northwestern Romania, southeastern Poland, Ukraine, Belarus, and Russia. A partial solar eclipse will also be visible for parts of Europe, North Africa, Greenland, northern Canada, Alaska, and Asia.

The annular eclipse will cross Europe and Russia. Eight European capitals will observe annual eclipse: Monaco, San Marino, Ljubljana, Zagreb, Vienna, Bratislava, Budapest and Moscow. For Moscow it will be the first central eclipse since 1887. Other European large cities (non-capitals), in which the annular eclipse will be seen include Barcelona, Marseille, Genoa, Graz, Kraków, Lviv, Nizhny Novgorod, Kirov.

== Eclipse details ==
Shown below are two tables displaying details about this particular solar eclipse. The first table outlines times at which the Moon's penumbra or umbra attains the specific parameter, and the second table describes various other parameters pertaining to this eclipse.

July 13, 2075 Solar Eclipse Times
Event	Time (UTC)
First Penumbral External Contact	2075 July 13 at 03:17:41.4 UTC
First Umbral External Contact	2075 July 13 at 04:33:52.6 UTC
First Central Line	2075 July 13 at 04:36:49.8 UTC
First Umbral Internal Contact	2075 July 13 at 04:39:49.5 UTC
Equatorial Conjunction	2075 July 13 at 06:01:28.2 UTC
Greatest Duration	2075 July 13 at 06:03:23.0 UTC
Greatest Eclipse	2075 July 13 at 06:05:44.0 UTC
Ecliptic Conjunction	2075 July 13 at 06:13:31.4 UTC
Last Umbral Internal Contact	2075 July 13 at 07:31:42.1 UTC
Last Central Line	2075 July 13 at 07:34:41.0 UTC
Last Umbral External Contact	2075 July 13 at 07:37:37.2 UTC
Last Penumbral External Contact	2075 July 13 at 08:53:46.6 UTC

July 13, 2075 Solar Eclipse Parameters
Parameter	Value
Eclipse Magnitude	0.94668
Eclipse Obscuration	0.89620
Gamma	0.65829
Sun Right Ascension	07h30m57.3s
Sun Declination	+21°47'03.5"
Sun Semi-Diameter	15'44.0"
Sun Equatorial Horizontal Parallax	08.7"
Moon Right Ascension	07h31m05.6s
Moon Declination	+22°22'29.6"
Moon Semi-Diameter	14'43.7"
Moon Equatorial Horizontal Parallax	0°54'03.3"
ΔT	101.8 s

== Eclipse season ==
This eclipse is part of an eclipse season, a period, roughly every six months, when eclipses occur. Only two (or occasionally three) eclipse seasons occur each year, and each season lasts about 35 days and repeats just short of six months (173 days) later; thus two full eclipse seasons always occur each year. Either two or three eclipses happen each eclipse season. In the sequence below, each eclipse is separated by a fortnight.

Eclipse season of June–July 2075
June 28 Descending node (full moon)	July 13 Ascending node (new moon)
Partial lunar eclipse Lunar Saros 121	Annular solar eclipse Solar Saros 147

== Related eclipses ==
=== Eclipses in 2075 ===
- A penumbral lunar eclipse on January 2.
- A total solar eclipse on January 16.
- A partial lunar eclipse on June 28.
- An annular solar eclipse on July 13.
- A partial lunar eclipse on December 22.

=== Metonic ===
- Preceded by: Solar eclipse of September 23, 2071
- Followed by: Solar eclipse of May 1, 2079

=== Tzolkinex ===
- Preceded by: Solar eclipse of May 31, 2068
- Followed by: Solar eclipse of August 24, 2082

=== Half-Saros ===
- Preceded by: Lunar eclipse of July 7, 2066
- Followed by: Lunar eclipse of July 17, 2084

=== Tritos ===
- Preceded by: Solar eclipse of August 12, 2064
- Followed by: Solar eclipse of June 11, 2086

=== Solar Saros 147 ===
- Preceded by: Solar eclipse of July 1, 2057
- Followed by: Solar eclipse of July 23, 2093

=== Inex ===
- Preceded by: Solar eclipse of August 2, 2046
- Followed by: Solar eclipse of June 22, 2104

=== Triad ===
- Preceded by: Solar eclipse of September 11, 1988
- Followed by: Solar eclipse of May 14, 2162

=== Solar eclipses of 2073–2076 ===
This eclipse is a member of a semester series. An eclipse in a semester series of solar eclipses repeats approximately every 177 days and 4 hours (a semester) at alternating nodes of the Moon's orbit.

The partial solar eclipses on June 1, 2076 and November 26, 2076 occur in the next lunar year eclipse set.

Solar eclipse series sets from 2073 to 2076
Descending node			Ascending node		
Saros	Map	Gamma	Saros	Map	Gamma
122	February 7, 2073 Partial	1.1651	127	August 3, 2073 Total	−0.8763
132	January 27, 2074 Annular	0.4251	137	July 24, 2074 Annular	−0.1242
142	January 16, 2075 Total	−0.2799	147	July 13, 2075 Annular	0.6583
152	January 6, 2076 Total	−0.9373	157	July 1, 2076 Partial	1.4005

=== Saros 147 ===
This eclipse is a part of Saros series 147, repeating every 18 years, 11 days, and containing 80 events. The series started with a partial solar eclipse on October 12, 1624. It contains annular eclipses from May 31, 2003 through July 31, 2706. There are no hybrid or total eclipses in this set. The series ends at member 80 as a partial eclipse on February 24, 3049. Its eclipses are tabulated in three columns; every third eclipse in the same column is one exeligmos apart, so they all cast shadows over approximately the same parts of the Earth.

The longest duration of annularity will be produced by member 38 at 9 minutes, 41 seconds on November 21, 2291. All eclipses in this series occur at the Moon’s ascending node of orbit.

Series members 11–32 occur between 1801 and 2200:
11	12	13
January 30, 1805	February 11, 1823	February 21, 1841
14	15	16
March 4, 1859	March 15, 1877	March 26, 1895
17	18	19
April 6, 1913	April 18, 1931	April 28, 1949
20	21	22
May 9, 1967	May 19, 1985	May 31, 2003
23	24	25
June 10, 2021	June 21, 2039	July 1, 2057
26	27	28
July 13, 2075	July 23, 2093	August 4, 2111
29	30	31
August 15, 2129	August 26, 2147	September 5, 2165
32
September 16, 2183

=== Metonic series ===
The metonic series repeats eclipses every 19 years (6939.69 days), lasting about 5 cycles. Eclipses occur in nearly the same calendar date. In addition, the octon subseries repeats 1/5 of that or every 3.8 years (1387.94 days). All eclipses in this table occur at the Moon's ascending node.

21 eclipse events between July 13, 2018 and July 12, 2094
July 12–13	April 30–May 1	February 16–17	December 5–6	September 22–23
117	119	121	123	125
July 13, 2018	April 30, 2022	February 17, 2026	December 5, 2029	September 23, 2033
127	129	131	133	135
July 13, 2037	April 30, 2041	February 16, 2045	December 5, 2048	September 22, 2052
137	139	141	143	145
July 12, 2056	April 30, 2060	February 17, 2064	December 6, 2067	September 23, 2071
147	149	151	153	155
July 13, 2075	May 1, 2079	February 16, 2083	December 6, 2086	September 23, 2090
157
July 12, 2094

=== Tritos series ===
This eclipse is a part of a tritos cycle, repeating at alternating nodes every 135 synodic months (≈ 3986.63 days, or 11 years minus 1 month). Their appearance and longitude are irregular due to a lack of synchronization with the anomalistic month (period of perigee), but groupings of 3 tritos cycles (≈ 33 years minus 3 months) come close (≈ 434.044 anomalistic months), so eclipses are similar in these groupings.

Series members between 1801 and 2200
August 28, 1802 (Saros 122)	July 27, 1813 (Saros 123)	June 26, 1824 (Saros 124)	May 27, 1835 (Saros 125)	April 25, 1846 (Saros 126)
March 25, 1857 (Saros 127)	February 23, 1868 (Saros 128)	January 22, 1879 (Saros 129)	December 22, 1889 (Saros 130)	November 22, 1900 (Saros 131)
October 22, 1911 (Saros 132)	September 21, 1922 (Saros 133)	August 21, 1933 (Saros 134)	July 20, 1944 (Saros 135)	June 20, 1955 (Saros 136)
May 20, 1966 (Saros 137)	April 18, 1977 (Saros 138)	March 18, 1988 (Saros 139)	February 16, 1999 (Saros 140)	January 15, 2010 (Saros 141)
December 14, 2020 (Saros 142)	November 14, 2031 (Saros 143)	October 14, 2042 (Saros 144)	September 12, 2053 (Saros 145)	August 12, 2064 (Saros 146)
July 13, 2075 (Saros 147)	June 11, 2086 (Saros 148)	May 11, 2097 (Saros 149)	April 11, 2108 (Saros 150)	March 11, 2119 (Saros 151)
February 8, 2130 (Saros 152)	January 8, 2141 (Saros 153)	December 8, 2151 (Saros 154)	November 7, 2162 (Saros 155)	October 7, 2173 (Saros 156)
September 4, 2184 (Saros 157)	August 5, 2195 (Saros 158)			

=== Inex series ===
This eclipse is a part of the long period inex cycle, repeating at alternating nodes, every 358 synodic months (≈ 10,571.95 days, or 29 years minus 20 days). Their appearance and longitude are irregular due to a lack of synchronization with the anomalistic month (period of perigee). However, groupings of 3 inex cycles (≈ 87 years minus 2 months) comes close (≈ 1,151.02 anomalistic months), so eclipses are similar in these groupings.

Series members between 1801 and 2200
January 10, 1815 (Saros 138)	December 21, 1843 (Saros 139)	November 30, 1872 (Saros 140)
November 11, 1901 (Saros 141)	October 21, 1930 (Saros 142)	October 2, 1959 (Saros 143)
September 11, 1988 (Saros 144)	August 21, 2017 (Saros 145)	August 2, 2046 (Saros 146)
July 13, 2075 (Saros 147)	June 22, 2104 (Saros 148)	June 3, 2133 (Saros 149)
May 14, 2162 (Saros 150)	April 23, 2191 (Saros 151)	
