= Solar eclipse of September 23, 2071 =

Total eclipse

- Total eclipse
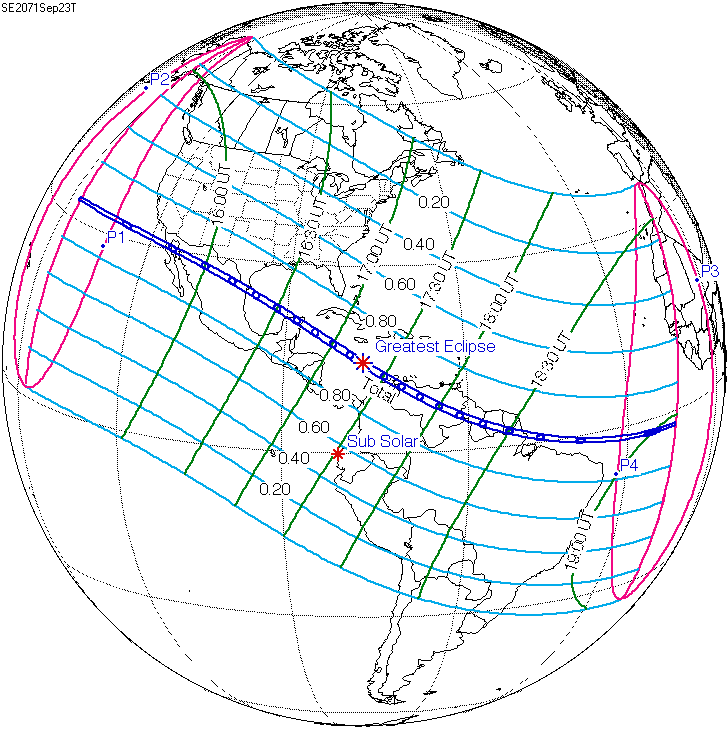
- Map
- Gamma: 0.262
- Magnitude: 1.0333

Maximum eclipse
- Duration: 191 s (3 min 11 s)
- Coordinates: 14.2°N 76.7°W
- Max. width of band: 116 km (72 mi)

Times (UTC)
- Greatest eclipse: 17:20:28

References
- Saros: 145 (25 of 77)
- Catalog # (SE5000): 9668

A total solar eclipse will occur at the Moon's ascending node of orbit on Wednesday, September 23, 2071, with a magnitude of 1.0333. A solar eclipse occurs when the Moon passes between Earth and the Sun, thereby totally or partly obscuring the image of the Sun for a viewer on Earth. A total solar eclipse occurs when the Moon's apparent diameter is larger than the Sun's, blocking all direct sunlight, turning day into darkness. Totality occurs in a narrow path across Earth's surface, with the partial solar eclipse visible over a surrounding region thousands of kilometres wide. Occurring about 2.5 days before perigee (on September 21, 2071, at 5:10 UTC), the Moon's apparent diameter will be larger.

The path of totality will be visible from parts of northern Mexico, northern Colombia, Venezuela, Guyana, far northern Brazil, Suriname, and French Guiana. A partial solar eclipse will also be visible for parts of Hawaii, North America, Central America, the Caribbean, northern and central South America, and West Africa.

== Eclipse details ==
Shown below are two tables displaying details about this particular solar eclipse. The first table outlines times at which the Moon's penumbra or umbra attains the specific parameter, and the second table describes various other parameters pertaining to this eclipse.

September 23, 2071 Solar Eclipse Times
| Event | Time (UTC) |
|---|---|
| First Penumbral External Contact | 2071 September 23 at 14:38:55.1 UTC |
| First Umbral External Contact | 2071 September 23 at 15:37:23.6 UTC |
| First Central Line | 2071 September 23 at 15:37:53.7 UTC |
| First Umbral Internal Contact | 2071 September 23 at 15:38:23.8 UTC |
| First Penumbral Internal Contact | 2071 September 23 at 16:40:44.4 UTC |
| Equatorial Conjunction | 2071 September 23 at 17:11:32.7 UTC |
| Greatest Duration | 2071 September 23 at 17:18:47.4 UTC |
| Greatest Eclipse | 2071 September 23 at 17:20:28.0 UTC |
| Ecliptic Conjunction | 2071 September 23 at 17:23:14.4 UTC |
| Last Penumbral Internal Contact | 2071 September 23 at 18:00:25.0 UTC |
| Last Umbral Internal Contact | 2071 September 23 at 19:02:41.8 UTC |
| Last Central Line | 2071 September 23 at 19:03:09.5 UTC |
| Last Umbral External Contact | 2071 September 23 at 19:03:37.1 UTC |
| Last Penumbral External Contact | 2071 September 23 at 20:02:10.4 UTC |

September 23, 2071 Solar Eclipse Parameters
| Parameter | Value |
|---|---|
| Eclipse Magnitude | 1.03329 |
| Eclipse Obscuration | 1.06769 |
| Gamma | 0.26200 |
| Sun Right Ascension | 12h02m56.7s |
| Sun Declination | -00°19'08.2" |
| Sun Semi-Diameter | 15'56.2" |
| Sun Equatorial Horizontal Parallax | 08.8" |
| Moon Right Ascension | 12h03m15.7s |
| Moon Declination | -00°04'20.0" |
| Moon Semi-Diameter | 16'12.3" |
| Moon Equatorial Horizontal Parallax | 0°59'28.3" |
| ΔT | 98.8 s |

== Eclipse season ==
This eclipse is part of an eclipse season, a period, roughly every six months, when eclipses occur. Only two (or occasionally three) eclipse seasons occur each year, and each season lasts about 35 days and repeats just short of six months (173 days) later; thus two full eclipse seasons always occur each year. Either two or three eclipses happen each eclipse season. In the sequence below, each eclipse is separated by a fortnight.

Eclipse season of September 2071
| September 9 Descending node (full moon) | September 23 Ascending node (new moon) |
|---|---|
| Penumbral lunar eclipse Lunar Saros 119 | Total solar eclipse Solar Saros 145 |

== Related eclipses ==
=== Eclipses in 2071 ===
- A penumbral lunar eclipse on March 16.
- An annular solar eclipse on March 31.
- A penumbral lunar eclipse on September 9.
- A total solar eclipse on September 23.

=== Metonic ===
- Preceded by: Solar eclipse of December 6, 2067
- Followed by: Solar eclipse of July 13, 2075

=== Tzolkinex ===
- Preceded by: Solar eclipse of August 12, 2064
- Followed by: Solar eclipse of November 4, 2078

=== Half-Saros ===
- Preceded by: Lunar eclipse of September 18, 2062
- Followed by: Lunar eclipse of September 29, 2080

=== Tritos ===
- Preceded by: Solar eclipse of October 24, 2060
- Followed by: Solar eclipse of August 24, 2082

=== Solar Saros 145 ===
- Preceded by: Solar eclipse of September 12, 2053
- Followed by: Solar eclipse of October 4, 2089

=== Inex ===
- Preceded by: Solar eclipse of October 14, 2042
- Followed by: Solar eclipse of September 4, 2100

=== Triad ===
- Preceded by: Solar eclipse of November 22, 1984
- Followed by: Solar eclipse of July 25, 2158

=== Solar eclipses of 2069–2072 ===
This eclipse is a member of a semester series. An eclipse in a semester series of solar eclipses repeats approximately every 177 days and 4 hours (a semester) at alternating nodes of the Moon's orbit.

The partial solar eclipse on May 20, 2069 occurs in the previous lunar year eclipse set.

Solar eclipse series sets from 2069 to 2072
| Descending node | | | Ascending node | | |
| Saros | Map | Gamma | Saros | Map | Gamma |
| 120 | April 21, 2069 Partial | 1.0624 | 125 | October 15, 2069 Partial | −1.2524 |
| 130 | April 11, 2070 Total | 0.3652 | 135 | October 4, 2070 Annular | −0.495 |
| 140 | March 31, 2071 Annular | −0.3739 | 145 | September 23, 2071 Total | 0.262 |
| 150 | March 19, 2072 Partial | −1.1405 | 155 | September 12, 2072 Total | 0.9655 |

=== Saros 145 ===
This eclipse is a part of Saros series 145, repeating every 18 years, 11 days, and containing 77 events. The series started with a partial solar eclipse on January 4, 1639. It contains an annular eclipse on June 6, 1891; a hybrid eclipse on June 17, 1909; and total eclipses from June 29, 1927 through September 9, 2648. The series ends at member 77 as a partial eclipse on April 17, 3009. Its eclipses are tabulated in three columns; every third eclipse in the same column is one exeligmos apart, so they all cast shadows over approximately the same parts of the Earth.

The longest duration of annularity was produced by member 15 at 6 seconds (by default) on June 6, 1891, and the longest duration of totality will be produced by member 50 at 7 minutes, 12 seconds on June 25, 2522. All eclipses in this series occur at the Moon’s ascending node of orbit.

Series members 10–32 occur between 1801 and 2200:
| 10 | 11 | 12 |
|---|---|---|
| April 13, 1801 | April 24, 1819 | May 4, 1837 |
| 13 | 14 | 15 |
| May 16, 1855 | May 26, 1873 | June 6, 1891 |
| 16 | 17 | 18 |
| June 17, 1909 | June 29, 1927 | July 9, 1945 |
| 19 | 20 | 21 |
| July 20, 1963 | July 31, 1981 | August 11, 1999 |
| 22 | 23 | 24 |
| August 21, 2017 | September 2, 2035 | September 12, 2053 |
| 25 | 26 | 27 |
| September 23, 2071 | October 4, 2089 | October 16, 2107 |
| 28 | 29 | 30 |
| October 26, 2125 | November 7, 2143 | November 17, 2161 |
| 31 | 32 | |
| November 28, 2179 | December 9, 2197 | |

=== Metonic series ===
The metonic series repeats eclipses every 19 years (6939.69 days), lasting about 5 cycles. Eclipses occur in nearly the same calendar date. In addition, the octon subseries repeats 1/5 of that or every 3.8 years (1387.94 days). All eclipses in this table occur at the Moon's ascending node.

21 eclipse events between July 13, 2018 and July 12, 2094
| July 12–13 | April 30–May 1 | February 16–17 | December 5–6 | September 22–23 |
| 117 | 119 | 121 | 123 | 125 |
|---|---|---|---|---|
| July 13, 2018 | April 30, 2022 | February 17, 2026 | December 5, 2029 | September 23, 2033 |
| 127 | 129 | 131 | 133 | 135 |
| July 13, 2037 | April 30, 2041 | February 16, 2045 | December 5, 2048 | September 22, 2052 |
| 137 | 139 | 141 | 143 | 145 |
| July 12, 2056 | April 30, 2060 | February 17, 2064 | December 6, 2067 | September 23, 2071 |
| 147 | 149 | 151 | 153 | 155 |
| July 13, 2075 | May 1, 2079 | February 16, 2083 | December 6, 2086 | September 23, 2090 |
157
July 12, 2094

=== Tritos series ===
This eclipse is a part of a tritos cycle, repeating at alternating nodes every 135 synodic months (≈ 3986.63 days, or 11 years minus 1 month). Their appearance and longitude are irregular due to a lack of synchronization with the anomalistic month (period of perigee), but groupings of 3 tritos cycles (≈ 33 years minus 3 months) come close (≈ 434.044 anomalistic months), so eclipses are similar in these groupings.

Series members between 1801 and 2200
| October 9, 1809 (Saros 121) | September 7, 1820 (Saros 122) | August 7, 1831 (Saros 123) | July 8, 1842 (Saros 124) | June 6, 1853 (Saros 125) |
| May 6, 1864 (Saros 126) | April 6, 1875 (Saros 127) | March 5, 1886 (Saros 128) | February 1, 1897 (Saros 129) | January 3, 1908 (Saros 130) |
| December 3, 1918 (Saros 131) | November 1, 1929 (Saros 132) | October 1, 1940 (Saros 133) | September 1, 1951 (Saros 134) | July 31, 1962 (Saros 135) |
| June 30, 1973 (Saros 136) | May 30, 1984 (Saros 137) | April 29, 1995 (Saros 138) | March 29, 2006 (Saros 139) | February 26, 2017 (Saros 140) |
| January 26, 2028 (Saros 141) | December 26, 2038 (Saros 142) | November 25, 2049 (Saros 143) | October 24, 2060 (Saros 144) | September 23, 2071 (Saros 145) |
| August 24, 2082 (Saros 146) | July 23, 2093 (Saros 147) | June 22, 2104 (Saros 148) | May 24, 2115 (Saros 149) | April 22, 2126 (Saros 150) |
| March 21, 2137 (Saros 151) | February 19, 2148 (Saros 152) | January 19, 2159 (Saros 153) | December 18, 2169 (Saros 154) | November 17, 2180 (Saros 155) |
October 18, 2191 (Saros 156)

=== Inex series ===
This eclipse is a part of the long period inex cycle, repeating at alternating nodes, every 358 synodic months (≈ 10,571.95 days, or 29 years minus 20 days). Their appearance and longitude are irregular due to a lack of synchronization with the anomalistic month (period of perigee). However, groupings of 3 inex cycles (≈ 87 years minus 2 months) comes close (≈ 1,151.02 anomalistic months), so eclipses are similar in these groupings.

Series members between 1801 and 2200
| March 24, 1811 (Saros 136) | March 4, 1840 (Saros 137) | February 11, 1869 (Saros 138) |
| January 22, 1898 (Saros 139) | January 3, 1927 (Saros 140) | December 14, 1955 (Saros 141) |
| November 22, 1984 (Saros 142) | November 3, 2013 (Saros 143) | October 14, 2042 (Saros 144) |
| September 23, 2071 (Saros 145) | September 4, 2100 (Saros 146) | August 15, 2129 (Saros 147) |
| July 25, 2158 (Saros 148) | July 6, 2187 (Saros 149) | |
