= Solar eclipse of May 20, 2050 =

Total eclipse

- Hybrid eclipse
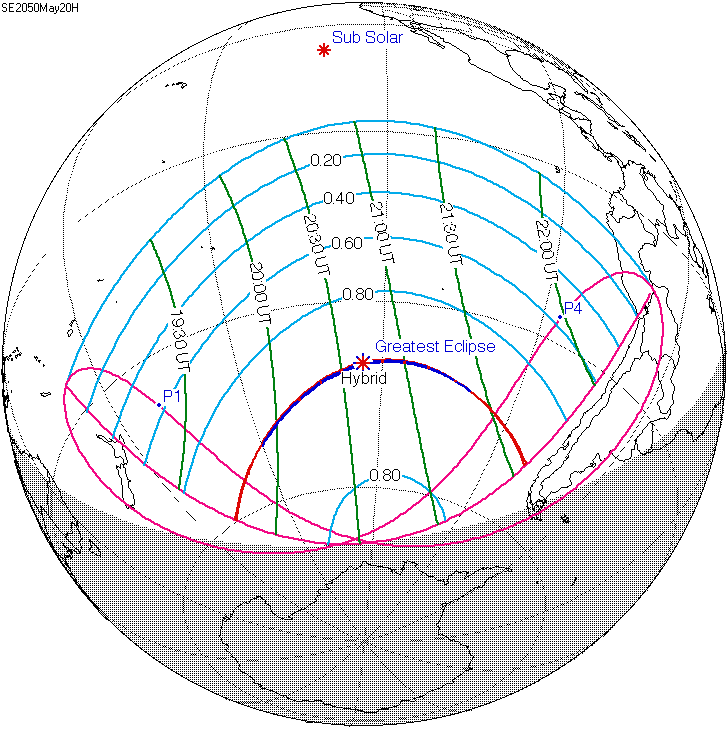
- Map
- Gamma: −0.8688
- Magnitude: 1.0038

Maximum eclipse
- Duration: 21 s (0 min 21 s)
- Coordinates: 40.1°S 123.7°W
- Max. width of band: 27 km (17 mi)

Times (UTC)
- Greatest eclipse: 20:42:50

References
- Saros: 148 (23 of 75)
- Catalog # (SE5000): 9619

A total solar eclipse will occur at the Moon's descending node of orbit on Friday, May 20, 2050, with a magnitude of 1.0038. It is a hybrid event, with only a fraction of its path as total, and longer sections at the start and end as an annular eclipse. A solar eclipse occurs when the Moon passes between Earth and the Sun, thereby totally or partly obscuring the image of the Sun for a viewer on Earth. A hybrid solar eclipse is a rare type of solar eclipse that changes its appearance from annular to total and back as the Moon's shadow moves across the Earth's surface. Totality occurs between the annularity paths across the surface of the Earth, with the partial solar eclipse visible over a surrounding region thousands of kilometres wide. Occurring about 5.2 days after perigee (on May 15, 2050, at 16:40 UTC), the Moon's apparent diameter will be larger.

This hybrid eclipse is notable in that the path of hybridity does not hit land anywhere on Earth. However, a partial solar eclipse will be visible for parts of New Zealand, eastern Oceania, and western South America.

== Eclipse timing ==
=== Places experiencing partial eclipse ===
Solar Eclipse of May 20, 2050 (Local Times)
Country or territory	City or place	Start of partial eclipse	Maximum eclipse	End of partial eclipse	Duration of eclipse (hr:min)	Maximum coverage
Tonga	Nuku'alofa (Note: The times listed for this location occur on May 21, 2050, local time.)	07:48:55	08:13:09	08:38:36	0:50	1.87%
Tonga	Pangai	07:54:59	08:13:44	08:33:13	0:38	0.81%
Tonga	Neiafu	08:05:07	08:14:03	08:23:09	0:18	0.08%
Niue	Alofi	07:50:22	08:17:36	08:46:23	0:56	2.29%
New Zealand	Auckland	07:16:47 (sunrise)	07:19:42	08:07:45	0:51	26.09%
New Zealand	Chatham Islands	07:45:32 (sunrise)	08:09:03	09:16:37	1:31	55.45%
Cook Islands	Rarotonga	08:36:02	09:29:30	10:28:57	1:53	15.95%
Norfolk Island	Kingston	06:27:40 (sunrise)	06:30:18	06:36:11	0:09	0.82%
New Zealand	Wellington	07:27:42 (sunrise)	07:30:52	08:16:38	0:49	34.56%
French Polynesia	Vaitape	08:46:51	09:44:07	10:47:34	2:01	14.62%
French Polynesia	Papeete	08:44:44	09:48:01	10:58:28	2:14	19.64%
New Zealand	Christchurch	07:42:27 (sunrise)	07:50:56	08:18:34	0:36	21.45%
French Polynesia	Gambier Islands	09:50:39	11:20:08	12:55:08	3:04	52.10%
Pitcairn Islands	Adamstown	10:57:45	12:32:16	14:09:03	3:11	61.65%
Chile	Punta Arenas	17:25:17	17:45:24	17:49:37 (sunset)	0:24	17.22%
Argentina	Neuquén	17:50:50	18:21:31	18:24:31 (sunset)	0:34	29.14%
Argentina	Córdoba	18:08:17	18:23:04	18:25:44 (sunset)	0:17	8.99%
Chile	Easter Island	13:49:13	15:24:23	16:48:37	2:59	69.11%
Argentina	Bariloche	17:44:05	18:28:46	18:31:53 (sunset)	0:48	49.44%
Argentina	San Miguel de Tucumán	18:17:08	18:32:24	18:38:41 (sunset)	0:22	7.95%
Argentina	Mendoza	18:01:02	18:32:24	18:41:21 (sunset)	0:40	26.13%
Argentina	Salta	18:21:42	18:40:38	18:43:08 (sunset)	0:21	9.48%
Chile	Santiago	16:58:08	17:43:51	17:47:26 (sunset)	0:49	41.56%
Bolivia	Sucre	17:38:05	17:49:55	17:52:18 (sunset)	0:14	3.06%
Bolivia	Cochabamba	17:42:42	17:56:10	17:58:32 (sunset)	0:16	2.85%
Bolivia	La Paz	17:43:02	18:05:21	18:07:50 (sunset)	0:25	4.40%
Peru	Arequipa	16:37:46	17:12:30	17:21:37 (sunset)	0:44	7.14%
Peru	Lima	16:44:43	17:13:19	17:40:18	0:56	3.13%

== Eclipse details ==
Shown below are two tables displaying details about this particular solar eclipse. The first table outlines times at which the Moon's penumbra or umbra attains the specific parameter, and the second table describes various other parameters pertaining to this eclipse.

May 20, 2050 Solar Eclipse Times
Event	Time (UTC)
First Penumbral External Contact	2050 May 20 at 18:22:31.0 UTC
First Umbral External Contact	2050 May 20 at 19:48:47.9 UTC
First Central Line	2050 May 20 at 19:49:02.9 UTC
First Umbral Internal Contact	2050 May 20 at 19:49:18.0 UTC
Equatorial Conjunction	2050 May 20 at 20:31:51.3 UTC
Greatest Duration	2050 May 20 at 20:40:50.3 UTC
Greatest Eclipse	2050 May 20 at 20:42:50.2 UTC
Ecliptic Conjunction	2050 May 20 at 20:52:15.7 UTC
Last Umbral Internal Contact	2050 May 20 at 21:36:27.6 UTC
Last Central Line	2050 May 20 at 21:36:45.5 UTC
Last Umbral External Contact	2050 May 20 at 21:37:03.3 UTC
Last Penumbral External Contact	2050 May 20 at 23:03:20.1 UTC

May 20, 2050 Solar Eclipse Parameters
Parameter	Value
Eclipse Magnitude	1.00379
Eclipse Obscuration	1.00760
Gamma	−0.86877
Sun Right Ascension	03h51m25.4s
Sun Declination	+20°09'01.9"
Sun Semi-Diameter	15'48.3"
Sun Equatorial Horizontal Parallax	08.7"
Moon Right Ascension	03h51m49.6s
Moon Declination	+19°19'17.1"
Moon Semi-Diameter	15'44.7"
Moon Equatorial Horizontal Parallax	0°57'47.0"
ΔT	84.3 s

== Eclipse season ==
This eclipse is part of an eclipse season, a period, roughly every six months, when eclipses occur. Only two (or occasionally three) eclipse seasons occur each year, and each season lasts about 35 days and repeats just short of six months (173 days) later; thus two full eclipse seasons always occur each year. Either two or three eclipses happen each eclipse season. In the sequence below, each eclipse is separated by a fortnight.

Eclipse season of May 2050
May 6 Ascending node (full moon)	May 20 Descending node (new moon)
Total lunar eclipse Lunar Saros 122	Hybrid solar eclipse Solar Saros 148

== Related eclipses ==
=== Eclipses in 2050 ===
- A total lunar eclipse on May 6.
- A hybrid solar eclipse on May 20.
- A total lunar eclipse on October 30.
- A partial solar eclipse on November 14.

=== Metonic ===
- Preceded by: Solar eclipse of August 2, 2046
- Followed by: Solar eclipse of March 9, 2054

=== Tzolkinex ===
- Preceded by: Solar eclipse of April 9, 2043
- Followed by: Solar eclipse of July 1, 2057

=== Half-Saros ===
- Preceded by: Lunar eclipse of May 16, 2041
- Followed by: Lunar eclipse of May 27, 2059

=== Tritos ===
- Preceded by: Solar eclipse of June 21, 2039
- Followed by: Solar eclipse of April 20, 2061

=== Solar Saros 148 ===
- Preceded by: Solar eclipse of May 9, 2032
- Followed by: Solar eclipse of May 31, 2068

=== Inex ===
- Preceded by: Solar eclipse of June 10, 2021
- Followed by: Solar eclipse of May 1, 2079

=== Triad ===
- Preceded by: Solar eclipse of July 20, 1963
- Followed by: Solar eclipse of March 21, 2137

=== Solar eclipses of 2047–2050 ===
This eclipse is a member of a semester series. An eclipse in a semester series of solar eclipses repeats approximately every 177 days and 4 hours (a semester) at alternating nodes of the Moon's orbit.

The partial solar eclipses on January 26, 2047 and July 22, 2047 occur in the previous lunar year eclipse set.

Solar eclipse series sets from 2047 to 2050
Descending node			Ascending node		
Saros	Map	Gamma	Saros	Map	Gamma
118	June 23, 2047 Partial	1.3766	123	December 16, 2047 Partial	−1.0661
128	June 11, 2048 Annular	0.6468	133	December 5, 2048 Total	−0.3973
138	May 31, 2049 Annular	−0.1187	143	November 25, 2049 Hybrid	0.2943
148	May 20, 2050 Hybrid	−0.8688	153	November 14, 2050 Partial	1.0447

=== Saros 148 ===
This eclipse is a part of Saros series 148, repeating every 18 years, 11 days, and containing 75 events. The series started with a partial solar eclipse on September 21, 1653. It contains annular eclipses on April 29, 2014 and May 9, 2032; a hybrid eclipse on May 20, 2050; and total eclipses from May 31, 2068 through August 3, 2771. The series ends at member 75 as a partial eclipse on December 12, 2987. Its eclipses are tabulated in three columns; every third eclipse in the same column is one exeligmos apart, so they all cast shadows over approximately the same parts of the Earth.

The longest duration of annularity will be produced by member 22 at 22 seconds (by default) on May 9, 2032, and the longest duration of totality will be produced by member 54 at 5 minutes, 23 seconds on April 26, 2609. All eclipses in this series occur at the Moon’s descending node of orbit.

Series members 10–31 occur between 1801 and 2200:
10	11	12
December 30, 1815	January 9, 1834	January 21, 1852
13	14	15
January 31, 1870	February 11, 1888	February 23, 1906
16	17	18
March 5, 1924	March 16, 1942	March 27, 1960
19	20	21
April 7, 1978	April 17, 1996	April 29, 2014
22	23	24
May 9, 2032	May 20, 2050	May 31, 2068
25	26	27
June 11, 2086	June 22, 2104	July 4, 2122
28	29	30
July 14, 2140	July 25, 2158	August 4, 2176
31
August 16, 2194

=== Metonic series ===
The metonic series repeats eclipses every 19 years (6939.69 days), lasting about 5 cycles. Eclipses occur in nearly the same calendar date. In addition, the octon subseries repeats 1/5 of that or every 3.8 years (1387.94 days). All eclipses in this table occur at the Moon's descending node.

21 eclipse events between May 21, 1993 and May 20, 2069
May 20–21	March 9	December 25–26	October 13–14	August 1–2
118	120	122	124	126
May 21, 1993	March 9, 1997	December 25, 2000	October 14, 2004	August 1, 2008
128	130	132	134	136
May 20, 2012	March 9, 2016	December 26, 2019	October 14, 2023	August 2, 2027
138	140	142	144	146
May 21, 2031	March 9, 2035	December 26, 2038	October 14, 2042	August 2, 2046
148	150	152	154	156
May 20, 2050	March 9, 2054	December 26, 2057	October 13, 2061	August 2, 2065
158
May 20, 2069

=== Tritos series ===
This eclipse is a part of a tritos cycle, repeating at alternating nodes every 135 synodic months (≈ 3986.63 days, or 11 years minus 1 month). Their appearance and longitude are irregular due to a lack of synchronization with the anomalistic month (period of perigee), but groupings of 3 tritos cycles (≈ 33 years minus 3 months) come close (≈ 434.044 anomalistic months), so eclipses are similar in these groupings.

Series members between 1801 and 2200
April 4, 1810 (Saros 126)	March 4, 1821 (Saros 127)	February 1, 1832 (Saros 128)	December 31, 1842 (Saros 129)	November 30, 1853 (Saros 130)
October 30, 1864 (Saros 131)	September 29, 1875 (Saros 132)	August 29, 1886 (Saros 133)	July 29, 1897 (Saros 134)	June 28, 1908 (Saros 135)
May 29, 1919 (Saros 136)	April 28, 1930 (Saros 137)	March 27, 1941 (Saros 138)	February 25, 1952 (Saros 139)	January 25, 1963 (Saros 140)
December 24, 1973 (Saros 141)	November 22, 1984 (Saros 142)	October 24, 1995 (Saros 143)	September 22, 2006 (Saros 144)	August 21, 2017 (Saros 145)
July 22, 2028 (Saros 146)	June 21, 2039 (Saros 147)	May 20, 2050 (Saros 148)	April 20, 2061 (Saros 149)	March 19, 2072 (Saros 150)
February 16, 2083 (Saros 151)	January 16, 2094 (Saros 152)	December 17, 2104 (Saros 153)	November 16, 2115 (Saros 154)	October 16, 2126 (Saros 155)
September 15, 2137 (Saros 156)	August 14, 2148 (Saros 157)	July 15, 2159 (Saros 158)	June 14, 2170 (Saros 159)	May 13, 2181 (Saros 160)
April 12, 2192 (Saros 161)

=== Inex series ===
This eclipse is a part of the long period inex cycle, repeating at alternating nodes, every 358 synodic months (≈ 10,571.95 days, or 29 years minus 20 days). Their appearance and longitude are irregular due to a lack of synchronization with the anomalistic month (period of perigee). However, groupings of 3 inex cycles (≈ 87 years minus 2 months) comes close (≈ 1,151.02 anomalistic months), so eclipses are similar in these groupings.

Series members between 1801 and 2200
October 29, 1818 (Saros 140)	October 9, 1847 (Saros 141)	September 17, 1876 (Saros 142)
August 30, 1905 (Saros 143)	August 10, 1934 (Saros 144)	July 20, 1963 (Saros 145)
June 30, 1992 (Saros 146)	June 10, 2021 (Saros 147)	May 20, 2050 (Saros 148)
May 1, 2079 (Saros 149)	April 11, 2108 (Saros 150)	March 21, 2137 (Saros 151)
March 2, 2166 (Saros 152)	February 10, 2195 (Saros 153)	
