= Solar eclipse of February 16, 2083 =

Future partial solar eclipse

- Partial eclipse
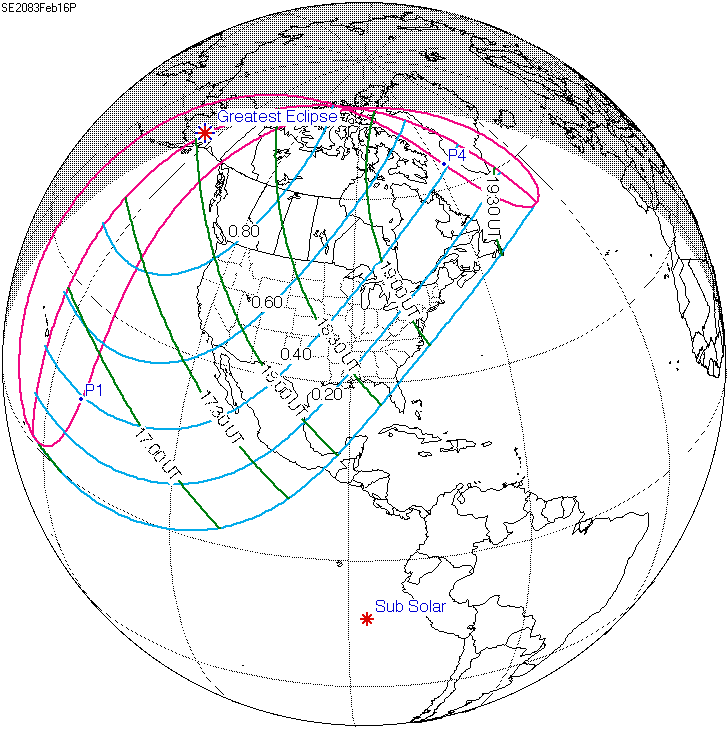
- Map
- Gamma: 1.017
- Magnitude: 0.9433

Maximum eclipse
- Coordinates: 61.6°N 154.1°W

Times (UTC)
- Greatest eclipse: 18:06:36

References
- Saros: 151 (18 of 72)
- Catalog # (SE5000): 9693

A partial solar eclipse will occur at the Moon's ascending node of orbit on Tuesday, February 16, 2083, with a magnitude of 0.9433. A solar eclipse occurs when the Moon passes between Earth and the Sun, thereby totally or partly obscuring the image of the Sun for a viewer on Earth. A partial solar eclipse occurs in the polar regions of the Earth when the center of the Moon's shadow misses the Earth.

The partial solar eclipse will be visible for much of Hawaii and North America.

== Eclipse details ==
Shown below are two tables displaying details about this particular solar eclipse. The first table outlines times at which the Moon's penumbra or umbra attains the specific parameter, and the second table describes various other parameters pertaining to this eclipse.

February 16, 2083 Solar Eclipse Times
Event	Time (UTC)
First Penumbral External Contact	2083 February 16 at 15:53:58.1 UTC
Greatest Eclipse	2083 February 16 at 18:06:36.2 UTC
Ecliptic Conjunction	2083 February 16 at 18:17:55.8 UTC
Equatorial Conjunction	2083 February 16 at 19:02:03.3 UTC
Last Penumbral External Contact	2083 February 16 at 20:18:57.9 UTC

February 16, 2083 Solar Eclipse Parameters
Parameter	Value
Eclipse Magnitude	0.94327
Eclipse Obscuration	0.90394
Gamma	1.01701
Sun Right Ascension	22h01m38.8s
Sun Declination	-12°04'40.8"
Sun Semi-Diameter	16'11.4"
Sun Equatorial Horizontal Parallax	08.9"
Moon Right Ascension	21h59m56.3s
Moon Declination	-11°12'50.5"
Moon Semi-Diameter	15'28.4"
Moon Equatorial Horizontal Parallax	0°56'47.2"
ΔT	108.1 s

== Eclipse season ==
This eclipse is part of an eclipse season, a period, roughly every six months, when eclipses occur. Only two (or occasionally three) eclipse seasons occur each year, and each season lasts about 35 days and repeats just short of six months (173 days) later; thus two full eclipse seasons always occur each year. Either two or three eclipses happen each eclipse season. In the sequence below, each eclipse is separated by a fortnight.

Eclipse season of February 2083
February 2 Descending node (full moon)	February 16 Ascending node (new moon)
Total lunar eclipse Lunar Saros 125	Partial solar eclipse Solar Saros 151

== Related eclipses ==
=== Eclipses in 2083 ===
- A total lunar eclipse on February 2.
- A partial solar eclipse on February 16.
- A partial solar eclipse on July 15.
- A total lunar eclipse on July 29.
- A partial solar eclipse on August 13.

=== Metonic ===
- Preceded by: Solar eclipse of May 1, 2079
- Followed by: Solar eclipse of December 6, 2086

=== Tzolkinex ===
- Preceded by: Solar eclipse of January 6, 2076
- Followed by: Solar eclipse of March 31, 2090

=== Half-Saros ===
- Preceded by: Lunar eclipse of February 11, 2074
- Followed by: Lunar eclipse of February 23, 2092

=== Tritos ===
- Preceded by: Solar eclipse of March 19, 2072
- Followed by: Solar eclipse of January 16, 2094

=== Solar Saros 151 ===
- Preceded by: Solar eclipse of February 5, 2065
- Followed by: Solar eclipse of February 28, 2101

=== Inex ===
- Preceded by: Solar eclipse of March 9, 2054
- Followed by: Solar eclipse of January 29, 2112

=== Triad ===
- Preceded by: Solar eclipse of April 17, 1996
- Followed by: Solar eclipse of December 18, 2169

=== Solar eclipses of 2080–2083 ===
This eclipse is a member of a semester series. An eclipse in a semester series of solar eclipses repeats approximately every 177 days and 4 hours (a semester) at alternating nodes of the Moon's orbit.

The partial solar eclipse on July 15, 2083 occurs in the next lunar year eclipse set.

Solar eclipse series sets from 2080 to 2083
Ascending node			Descending node		
Saros	Map	Gamma	Saros	Map	Gamma
121	March 21, 2080 Partial	−1.0578	126	September 13, 2080 Partial	1.0723
131	March 10, 2081 Annular	−0.3653	136	September 3, 2081 Total	0.3378
141	February 27, 2082 Annular	0.3361	146	August 24, 2082 Total	−0.4004
151	February 16, 2083 Partial	1.017	156	August 13, 2083 Partial	−1.2064

=== Saros 151 ===
This eclipse is a part of Saros series 151, repeating every 18 years, 11 days, and containing 72 events. The series started with a partial solar eclipse on August 14, 1776. It contains annular eclipses from February 28, 2101 through April 23, 2191; a hybrid eclipse on May 5, 2209; and total eclipses from May 16, 2227 through July 6, 2912. The series ends at member 72 as a partial eclipse on October 1, 3056. Its eclipses are tabulated in three columns; every third eclipse in the same column is one exeligmos apart, so they all cast shadows over approximately the same parts of the Earth.

The longest duration of annularity will be produced by member 19 at 2 minutes, 44 seconds on February 28, 2101, and the longest duration of totality will be produced by member 60 at 5 minutes, 41 seconds on May 22, 2840. All eclipses in this series occur at the Moon’s ascending node of orbit.

Series members 3–24 occur between 1801 and 2200:
3	4	5
September 5, 1812	September 17, 1830	September 27, 1848
6	7	8
October 8, 1866	October 19, 1884	October 31, 1902
9	10	11
November 10, 1920	November 21, 1938	December 2, 1956
12	13	14
December 13, 1974	December 24, 1992	January 4, 2011
15	16	17
January 14, 2029	January 26, 2047	February 5, 2065
18	19	20
February 16, 2083	February 28, 2101	March 11, 2119
21	22	23
March 21, 2137	April 2, 2155	April 12, 2173
24
April 23, 2191

=== Metonic series ===
The metonic series repeats eclipses every 19 years (6939.69 days), lasting about 5 cycles. Eclipses occur in nearly the same calendar date. In addition, the octon subseries repeats 1/5 of that or every 3.8 years (1387.94 days). All eclipses in this table occur at the Moon's ascending node.

21 eclipse events between July 13, 2018 and July 12, 2094
July 12–13	April 30–May 1	February 16–17	December 5–6	September 22–23
117	119	121	123	125
July 13, 2018	April 30, 2022	February 17, 2026	December 5, 2029	September 23, 2033
127	129	131	133	135
July 13, 2037	April 30, 2041	February 16, 2045	December 5, 2048	September 22, 2052
137	139	141	143	145
July 12, 2056	April 30, 2060	February 17, 2064	December 6, 2067	September 23, 2071
147	149	151	153	155
July 13, 2075	May 1, 2079	February 16, 2083	December 6, 2086	September 23, 2090
157
July 12, 2094

=== Tritos series ===
This eclipse is a part of a tritos cycle, repeating at alternating nodes every 135 synodic months (≈ 3986.63 days, or 11 years minus 1 month). Their appearance and longitude are irregular due to a lack of synchronization with the anomalistic month (period of perigee), but groupings of 3 tritos cycles (≈ 33 years minus 3 months) come close (≈ 434.044 anomalistic months), so eclipses are similar in these groupings.

Series members between 1801 and 2200
April 4, 1810 (Saros 126)	March 4, 1821 (Saros 127)	February 1, 1832 (Saros 128)	December 31, 1842 (Saros 129)	November 30, 1853 (Saros 130)
October 30, 1864 (Saros 131)	September 29, 1875 (Saros 132)	August 29, 1886 (Saros 133)	July 29, 1897 (Saros 134)	June 28, 1908 (Saros 135)
May 29, 1919 (Saros 136)	April 28, 1930 (Saros 137)	March 27, 1941 (Saros 138)	February 25, 1952 (Saros 139)	January 25, 1963 (Saros 140)
December 24, 1973 (Saros 141)	November 22, 1984 (Saros 142)	October 24, 1995 (Saros 143)	September 22, 2006 (Saros 144)	August 21, 2017 (Saros 145)
July 22, 2028 (Saros 146)	June 21, 2039 (Saros 147)	May 20, 2050 (Saros 148)	April 20, 2061 (Saros 149)	March 19, 2072 (Saros 150)
February 16, 2083 (Saros 151)	January 16, 2094 (Saros 152)	December 17, 2104 (Saros 153)	November 16, 2115 (Saros 154)	October 16, 2126 (Saros 155)
September 15, 2137 (Saros 156)	August 14, 2148 (Saros 157)	July 15, 2159 (Saros 158)	June 14, 2170 (Saros 159)	May 13, 2181 (Saros 160)
April 12, 2192 (Saros 161)

=== Inex series ===
This eclipse is a part of the long period inex cycle, repeating at alternating nodes, every 358 synodic months (≈ 10,571.95 days, or 29 years minus 20 days). Their appearance and longitude are irregular due to a lack of synchronization with the anomalistic month (period of perigee). However, groupings of 3 inex cycles (≈ 87 years minus 2 months) comes close (≈ 1,151.02 anomalistic months), so eclipses are similar in these groupings.

Series members between 1801 and 2200
August 16, 1822 (Saros 142)	July 28, 1851 (Saros 143)	July 7, 1880 (Saros 144)
June 17, 1909 (Saros 145)	May 29, 1938 (Saros 146)	May 9, 1967 (Saros 147)
April 17, 1996 (Saros 148)	March 29, 2025 (Saros 149)	March 9, 2054 (Saros 150)
February 16, 2083 (Saros 151)	January 29, 2112 (Saros 152)	January 8, 2141 (Saros 153)
December 18, 2169 (Saros 154)	November 28, 2198 (Saros 155)	
