= Solar eclipse of March 9, 2054 =

Future partial solar eclipse

- Partial eclipse
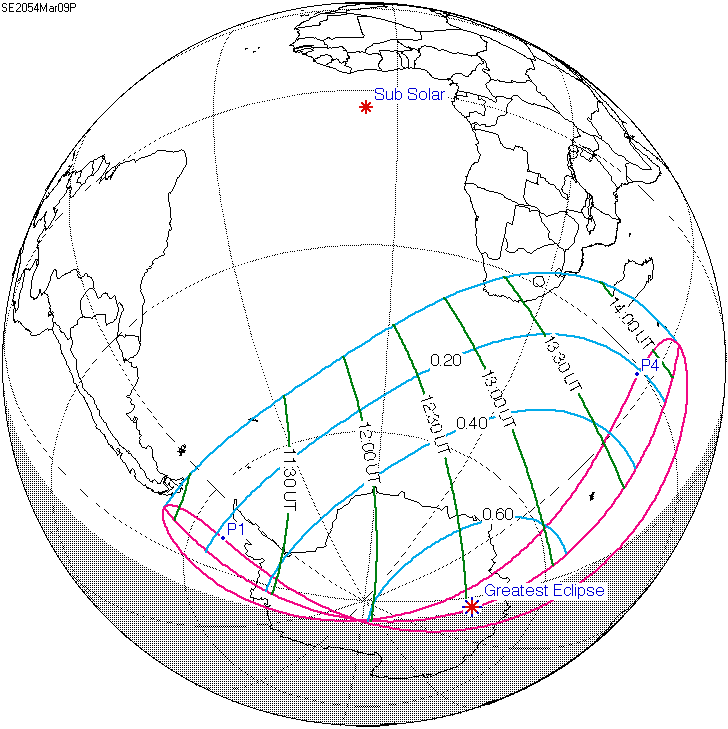
- Map
- Gamma: −1.1711
- Magnitude: 0.6678

Maximum eclipse
- Coordinates: 72°S 97.9°E

Times (UTC)
- Greatest eclipse: 12:33:40

References
- Saros: 150 (19 of 71)
- Catalog # (SE5000): 9627

A partial solar eclipse will occur at the Moon's descending node of orbit on Monday, March 9, 2054, with a magnitude of 0.6678. A solar eclipse occurs when the Moon passes between Earth and the Sun, thereby totally or partly obscuring the image of the Sun for a viewer on Earth. A partial solar eclipse occurs in the polar regions of the Earth when the center of the Moon's shadow misses the Earth.

The partial solar eclipse will be visible for parts of Antarctica, South Africa, and southern Madagascar.

== Eclipse details ==
Shown below are two tables displaying details about this particular solar eclipse. The first table outlines times at which the Moon's penumbra or umbra attains the specific parameter, and the second table describes various other parameters pertaining to this eclipse.

March 9, 2054 Solar Eclipse Times
Event	Time (UTC)
First Penumbral External Contact	2054 March 9 at 10:32:08.8 UTC
Equatorial Conjunction	2054 March 9 at 11:50:36.8 UTC
Greatest Eclipse	2054 March 9 at 12:33:40.5 UTC
Ecliptic Conjunction	2054 March 9 at 12:47:06.8 UTC
Last Penumbral External Contact	2054 March 9 at 14:35:28.0 UTC

March 9, 2054 Solar Eclipse Parameters
Parameter	Value
Eclipse Magnitude	0.66783
Eclipse Obscuration	0.56962
Gamma	−1.17111
Sun Right Ascension	23h20m07.5s
Sun Declination	-04°17'25.4"
Sun Semi-Diameter	16'06.6"
Sun Equatorial Horizontal Parallax	08.9"
Moon Right Ascension	23h21m24.6s
Moon Declination	-05°18'27.6"
Moon Semi-Diameter	14'55.7"
Moon Equatorial Horizontal Parallax	0°54'47.2"
ΔT	86.6 s

== Eclipse season ==
This eclipse is part of an eclipse season, a period, roughly every six months, when eclipses occur. Only two (or occasionally three) eclipse seasons occur each year, and each season lasts about 35 days and repeats just short of six months (173 days) later; thus two full eclipse seasons always occur each year. Either two or three eclipses happen each eclipse season. In the sequence below, each eclipse is separated by a fortnight.

Eclipse season of February–March 2054
February 22 Ascending node (full moon)	March 9 Descending node (new moon)
Total lunar eclipse Lunar Saros 124	Partial solar eclipse Solar Saros 150

== Related eclipses ==
=== Eclipses in 2054 ===
- A total lunar eclipse on February 22.
- A partial solar eclipse on March 9.
- A partial solar eclipse on August 3.
- A total lunar eclipse on August 18.
- A partial solar eclipse on September 2.

=== Metonic ===
- Preceded by: Solar eclipse of May 20, 2050
- Followed by: Solar eclipse of December 26, 2057

=== Tzolkinex ===
- Preceded by: Solar eclipse of January 26, 2047
- Followed by: Solar eclipse of April 20, 2061

=== Half-Saros ===
- Preceded by: Lunar eclipse of March 3, 2045
- Followed by: Lunar eclipse of March 14, 2063

=== Tritos ===
- Preceded by: Solar eclipse of April 9, 2043
- Followed by: Solar eclipse of February 5, 2065

=== Solar Saros 150 ===
- Preceded by: Solar eclipse of February 27, 2036
- Followed by: Solar eclipse of March 19, 2072

=== Inex ===
- Preceded by: Solar eclipse of March 29, 2025
- Followed by: Solar eclipse of February 16, 2083

=== Triad ===
- Preceded by: Solar eclipse of May 9, 1967
- Followed by: Solar eclipse of January 8, 2141

=== Solar eclipses of 2051–2054 ===
This eclipse is a member of a semester series. An eclipse in a semester series of solar eclipses repeats approximately every 177 days and 4 hours (a semester) at alternating nodes of the Moon's orbit.

The partial solar eclipse on August 3, 2054 occurs in the next lunar year eclipse set.

Solar eclipse series sets from 2051 to 2054
Descending node			Ascending node		
Saros	Map	Gamma	Saros	Map	Gamma
120	April 11, 2051 Partial	1.0169	125	October 4, 2051 Partial	−1.2094
130	March 30, 2052 Total	0.3238	135	September 22, 2052 Annular	−0.448
140	March 20, 2053 Annular	−0.4089	145	September 12, 2053 Total	0.314
150	March 9, 2054 Partial	−1.1711	155	September 2, 2054 Partial	1.0215

=== Saros 150 ===
This eclipse is a part of Saros series 150, repeating every 18 years, 11 days, and containing 71 events. The series started with a partial solar eclipse on August 24, 1729. It contains annular eclipses from April 22, 2126 through June 22, 2829. There are no hybrid or total eclipses in this set. The series ends at member 71 as a partial eclipse on September 29, 2991. Its eclipses are tabulated in three columns; every third eclipse in the same column is one exeligmos apart, so they all cast shadows over approximately the same parts of the Earth.

The longest duration of annularity will be produced by member 45 at 9 minutes, 58 seconds on December 19, 2522. All eclipses in this series occur at the Moon’s descending node of orbit.

Series members 5–27 occur between 1801 and 2200:
5	6	7
October 7, 1801	October 19, 1819	October 29, 1837
8	9	10
November 9, 1855	November 20, 1873	December 1, 1891
11	12	13
December 12, 1909	December 24, 1927	January 3, 1946
14	15	16
January 14, 1964	January 25, 1982	February 5, 2000
17	18	19
February 15, 2018	February 27, 2036	March 9, 2054
20	21	22
March 19, 2072	March 31, 2090	April 11, 2108
23	24	25
April 22, 2126	May 3, 2144	May 14, 2162
26	27	
May 24, 2180	June 4, 2198	

=== Metonic series ===
The metonic series repeats eclipses every 19 years (6939.69 days), lasting about 5 cycles. Eclipses occur in nearly the same calendar date. In addition, the octon subseries repeats 1/5 of that or every 3.8 years (1387.94 days). All eclipses in this table occur at the Moon's descending node.

21 eclipse events between May 21, 1993 and May 20, 2069
May 20–21	March 9	December 25–26	October 13–14	August 1–2
118	120	122	124	126
May 21, 1993	March 9, 1997	December 25, 2000	October 14, 2004	August 1, 2008
128	130	132	134	136
May 20, 2012	March 9, 2016	December 26, 2019	October 14, 2023	August 2, 2027
138	140	142	144	146
May 21, 2031	March 9, 2035	December 26, 2038	October 14, 2042	August 2, 2046
148	150	152	154	156
May 20, 2050	March 9, 2054	December 26, 2057	October 13, 2061	August 2, 2065
158
May 20, 2069

=== Tritos series ===
This eclipse is a part of a tritos cycle, repeating at alternating nodes every 135 synodic months (≈ 3986.63 days, or 11 years minus 1 month). Their appearance and longitude are irregular due to a lack of synchronization with the anomalistic month (period of perigee), but groupings of 3 tritos cycles (≈ 33 years minus 3 months) come close (≈ 434.044 anomalistic months), so eclipses are similar in these groupings.

Series members between 1801 and 2200
February 21, 1803 (Saros 127)	January 21, 1814 (Saros 128)	December 20, 1824 (Saros 129)	November 20, 1835 (Saros 130)	October 20, 1846 (Saros 131)
September 18, 1857 (Saros 132)	August 18, 1868 (Saros 133)	July 19, 1879 (Saros 134)	June 17, 1890 (Saros 135)	May 18, 1901 (Saros 136)
April 17, 1912 (Saros 137)	March 17, 1923 (Saros 138)	February 14, 1934 (Saros 139)	January 14, 1945 (Saros 140)	December 14, 1955 (Saros 141)
November 12, 1966 (Saros 142)	October 12, 1977 (Saros 143)	September 11, 1988 (Saros 144)	August 11, 1999 (Saros 145)	July 11, 2010 (Saros 146)
June 10, 2021 (Saros 147)	May 9, 2032 (Saros 148)	April 9, 2043 (Saros 149)	March 9, 2054 (Saros 150)	February 5, 2065 (Saros 151)
January 6, 2076 (Saros 152)	December 6, 2086 (Saros 153)	November 4, 2097 (Saros 154)	October 5, 2108 (Saros 155)	September 5, 2119 (Saros 156)
August 4, 2130 (Saros 157)	July 3, 2141 (Saros 158)	June 3, 2152 (Saros 159)		April 1, 2174 (Saros 161)

=== Inex series ===
This eclipse is a part of the long period inex cycle, repeating at alternating nodes, every 358 synodic months (≈ 10,571.95 days, or 29 years minus 20 days). Their appearance and longitude are irregular due to a lack of synchronization with the anomalistic month (period of perigee). However, groupings of 3 inex cycles (≈ 87 years minus 2 months) comes close (≈ 1,151.02 anomalistic months), so eclipses are similar in these groupings.

Series members between 1801 and 2200
August 16, 1822 (Saros 142)	July 28, 1851 (Saros 143)	July 7, 1880 (Saros 144)
June 17, 1909 (Saros 145)	May 29, 1938 (Saros 146)	May 9, 1967 (Saros 147)
April 17, 1996 (Saros 148)	March 29, 2025 (Saros 149)	March 9, 2054 (Saros 150)
February 16, 2083 (Saros 151)	January 29, 2112 (Saros 152)	January 8, 2141 (Saros 153)
December 18, 2169 (Saros 154)	November 28, 2198 (Saros 155)	
