= Solar eclipse of February 5, 2065 =

Future partial solar eclipse

- Partial eclipse
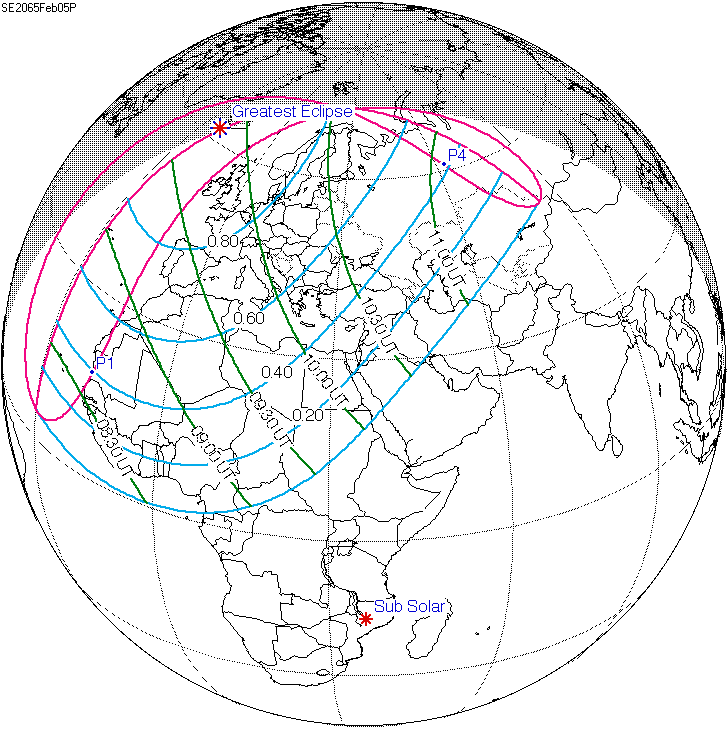
- Map
- Gamma: 1.0336
- Magnitude: 0.9123

Maximum eclipse
- Coordinates: 62.2°N 21.9°W

Times (UTC)
- Greatest eclipse: 9:52:26

References
- Saros: 151 (17 of 72)
- Catalog # (SE5000): 9652

A partial solar eclipse will occur at the Moon's ascending node of orbit on Thursday, February 5, 2065, with a magnitude of 0.9123. A solar eclipse occurs when the Moon passes between Earth and the Sun, thereby totally or partly obscuring the image of the Sun for a viewer on Earth. A partial solar eclipse occurs in the polar regions of the Earth when the center of the Moon's shadow misses the Earth.

This will be the first of four partial solar eclipses in 2065, with the others occurring on July 3, August 2, and December 27.

The partial solar eclipse will be visible for parts of North Africa, West Africa, Europe, and Central Asia.

== Eclipse details ==
Shown below are two tables displaying details about this particular solar eclipse. The first table outlines times at which the Moon's penumbra or umbra attains the specific parameter, and the second table describes various other parameters pertaining to this eclipse.

February 5, 2065 Solar Eclipse Times
Event	Time (UTC)
First Penumbral External Contact	2065 February 5 at 07:40:45.3 UTC
Greatest Eclipse	2065 February 5 at 09:52:25.5 UTC
Ecliptic Conjunction	2065 February 5 at 10:03:58.8 UTC
Equatorial Conjunction	2065 February 5 at 10:42:35.2 UTC
Last Penumbral External Contact	2065 February 5 at 12:03:51.2 UTC

February 5, 2065 Solar Eclipse Parameters
Parameter	Value
Eclipse Magnitude	0.91233
Eclipse Obscuration	0.86757
Gamma	1.03356
Sun Right Ascension	21h18m22.7s
Sun Declination	-15°41'30.6"
Sun Semi-Diameter	16'13.3"
Sun Equatorial Horizontal Parallax	08.9"
Moon Right Ascension	21h16m47.2s
Moon Declination	-14°47'52.5"
Moon Semi-Diameter	15'25.7"
Moon Equatorial Horizontal Parallax	0°56'37.5"
ΔT	93.9 s

== Eclipse season ==
This eclipse is part of an eclipse season, a period, roughly every six months, when eclipses occur. Only two (or occasionally three) eclipse seasons occur each year, and each season lasts about 35 days and repeats just short of six months (173 days) later; thus two full eclipse seasons always occur each year. Either two or three eclipses happen each eclipse season. In the sequence below, each eclipse is separated by a fortnight.

Eclipse season of January–February 2065
January 22 Descending node (full moon)	February 5 Ascending node (new moon)
Total lunar eclipse Lunar Saros 125	Partial solar eclipse Solar Saros 151

== Related eclipses ==
=== Eclipses in 2065 ===
- A total lunar eclipse on January 22.
- A partial solar eclipse on February 5.
- A partial solar eclipse on July 3.
- A total lunar eclipse on July 17.
- A partial solar eclipse on August 2.
- A partial solar eclipse on December 27.

=== Metonic ===
- Preceded by: Solar eclipse of April 20, 2061
- Followed by: Solar eclipse of November 24, 2068

=== Tzolkinex ===
- Preceded by: Solar eclipse of December 26, 2057
- Followed by: Solar eclipse of March 19, 2072

=== Half-Saros ===
- Preceded by: Lunar eclipse of February 1, 2056
- Followed by: Lunar eclipse of February 11, 2074

=== Tritos ===
- Preceded by: Solar eclipse of March 9, 2054
- Followed by: Solar eclipse of January 6, 2076

=== Solar Saros 151 ===
- Preceded by: Solar eclipse of January 26, 2047
- Followed by: Solar eclipse of February 16, 2083

=== Inex ===
- Preceded by: Solar eclipse of February 27, 2036
- Followed by: Solar eclipse of January 16, 2094

=== Triad ===
- Preceded by: Solar eclipse of April 7, 1978
- Followed by: Solar eclipse of December 8, 2151

=== Solar eclipses of 2062–2065 ===
This eclipse is a member of a semester series. An eclipse in a semester series of solar eclipses repeats approximately every 177 days and 4 hours (a semester) at alternating nodes of the Moon's orbit.

The partial solar eclipses on July 3, 2065 and December 27, 2065 occur in the next lunar year eclipse set.

Solar eclipse series sets from 2062 to 2065
Ascending node			Descending node		
Saros	Map	Gamma	Saros	Map	Gamma
121	March 11, 2062 Partial	−1.0238	126	September 3, 2062 Partial	1.0191
131	February 28, 2063 Annular	−0.336	136	August 24, 2063 Total	0.2771
141	February 17, 2064 Annular	0.3597	146	August 12, 2064 Total	−0.4652
151	February 5, 2065 Partial	1.0336	156	August 2, 2065 Partial	−1.2759

=== Saros 151 ===
This eclipse is a part of Saros series 151, repeating every 18 years, 11 days, and containing 72 events. The series started with a partial solar eclipse on August 14, 1776. It contains annular eclipses from February 28, 2101 through April 23, 2191; a hybrid eclipse on May 5, 2209; and total eclipses from May 16, 2227 through July 6, 2912. The series ends at member 72 as a partial eclipse on October 1, 3056. Its eclipses are tabulated in three columns; every third eclipse in the same column is one exeligmos apart, so they all cast shadows over approximately the same parts of the Earth.

The longest duration of annularity will be produced by member 19 at 2 minutes, 44 seconds on February 28, 2101, and the longest duration of totality will be produced by member 60 at 5 minutes, 41 seconds on May 22, 2840. All eclipses in this series occur at the Moon’s ascending node of orbit.

Series members 3–24 occur between 1801 and 2200:
3	4	5
September 5, 1812	September 17, 1830	September 27, 1848
6	7	8
October 8, 1866	October 19, 1884	October 31, 1902
9	10	11
November 10, 1920	November 21, 1938	December 2, 1956
12	13	14
December 13, 1974	December 24, 1992	January 4, 2011
15	16	17
January 14, 2029	January 26, 2047	February 5, 2065
18	19	20
February 16, 2083	February 28, 2101	March 11, 2119
21	22	23
March 21, 2137	April 2, 2155	April 12, 2173
24
April 23, 2191

=== Metonic series ===
The metonic series repeats eclipses every 19 years (6939.69 days), lasting about 5 cycles. Eclipses occur in nearly the same calendar date. In addition, the octon subseries repeats 1/5 of that or every 3.8 years (1387.94 days). All eclipses in this table occur at the Moon's ascending node.

21 eclipse events between July 1, 2000 and July 1, 2076
July 1–2	April 19–20	February 5–7	November 24–25	September 12–13
117	119	121	123	125
July 1, 2000	April 19, 2004	February 7, 2008	November 25, 2011	September 13, 2015
127	129	131	133	135
July 2, 2019	April 20, 2023	February 6, 2027	November 25, 2030	September 12, 2034
137	139	141	143	145
July 2, 2038	April 20, 2042	February 5, 2046	November 25, 2049	September 12, 2053
147	149	151	153	155
July 1, 2057	April 20, 2061	February 5, 2065	November 24, 2068	September 12, 2072
157
July 1, 2076

=== Tritos series ===
This eclipse is a part of a tritos cycle, repeating at alternating nodes every 135 synodic months (≈ 3986.63 days, or 11 years minus 1 month). Their appearance and longitude are irregular due to a lack of synchronization with the anomalistic month (period of perigee), but groupings of 3 tritos cycles (≈ 33 years minus 3 months) come close (≈ 434.044 anomalistic months), so eclipses are similar in these groupings.

Series members between 1801 and 2200
February 21, 1803 (Saros 127)	January 21, 1814 (Saros 128)	December 20, 1824 (Saros 129)	November 20, 1835 (Saros 130)	October 20, 1846 (Saros 131)
September 18, 1857 (Saros 132)	August 18, 1868 (Saros 133)	July 19, 1879 (Saros 134)	June 17, 1890 (Saros 135)	May 18, 1901 (Saros 136)
April 17, 1912 (Saros 137)	March 17, 1923 (Saros 138)	February 14, 1934 (Saros 139)	January 14, 1945 (Saros 140)	December 14, 1955 (Saros 141)
November 12, 1966 (Saros 142)	October 12, 1977 (Saros 143)	September 11, 1988 (Saros 144)	August 11, 1999 (Saros 145)	July 11, 2010 (Saros 146)
June 10, 2021 (Saros 147)	May 9, 2032 (Saros 148)	April 9, 2043 (Saros 149)	March 9, 2054 (Saros 150)	February 5, 2065 (Saros 151)
January 6, 2076 (Saros 152)	December 6, 2086 (Saros 153)	November 4, 2097 (Saros 154)	October 5, 2108 (Saros 155)	September 5, 2119 (Saros 156)
August 4, 2130 (Saros 157)	July 3, 2141 (Saros 158)	June 3, 2152 (Saros 159)		April 1, 2174 (Saros 161)

=== Inex series ===
This eclipse is a part of the long period inex cycle, repeating at alternating nodes, every 358 synodic months (≈ 10,571.95 days, or 29 years minus 20 days). Their appearance and longitude are irregular due to a lack of synchronization with the anomalistic month (period of perigee). However, groupings of 3 inex cycles (≈ 87 years minus 2 months) comes close (≈ 1,151.02 anomalistic months), so eclipses are similar in these groupings.

Series members between 1801 and 2200
August 5, 1804 (Saros 142)	July 17, 1833 (Saros 143)	June 27, 1862 (Saros 144)
June 6, 1891 (Saros 145)	May 18, 1920 (Saros 146)	April 28, 1949 (Saros 147)
April 7, 1978 (Saros 148)	March 19, 2007 (Saros 149)	February 27, 2036 (Saros 150)
February 5, 2065 (Saros 151)	January 16, 2094 (Saros 152)	December 28, 2122 (Saros 153)
December 8, 2151 (Saros 154)	November 17, 2180 (Saros 155)	
