= Solar eclipse of April 9, 2043 =

Total eclipse

- Total eclipse
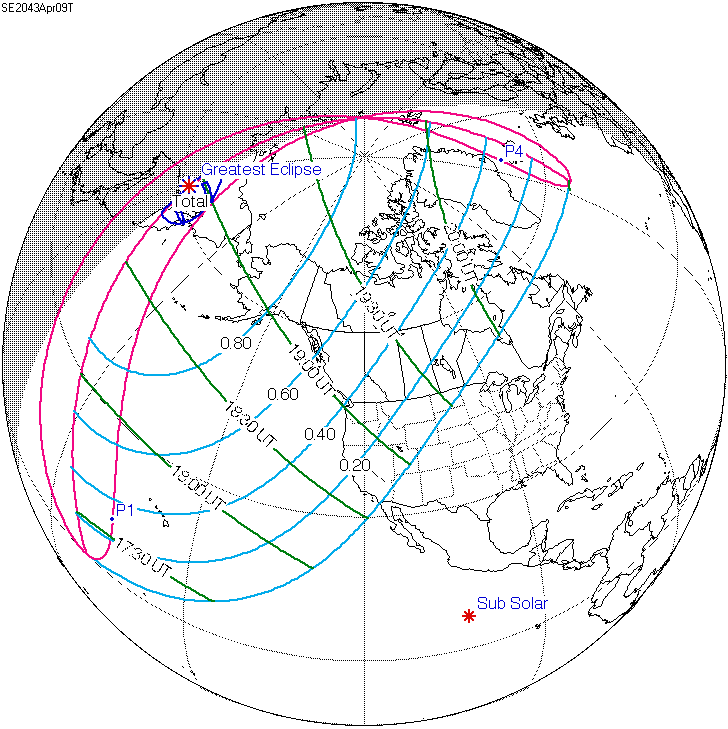
- Map
- Gamma: 1.0031
- Magnitude: 1.0095

Maximum eclipse
- Duration: -
- Coordinates: 61.3°N 152°E
- Max. width of band: km

Times (UTC)
- Greatest eclipse: 18:57:49

References
- Saros: 149 (22 of 71)
- Catalog # (SE5000): 9603

A total solar eclipse will occur at the Moon's ascending node of orbit on Thursday, April 9, 2043, with a magnitude of 1.0095. A solar eclipse occurs when the Moon passes between Earth and the Sun, thereby totally or partly obscuring the image of the Sun for a viewer on Earth. A total solar eclipse occurs when the Moon's apparent diameter is larger than the Sun's, blocking all direct sunlight, turning day into darkness. Totality occurs in a narrow path across Earth's surface, with the partial solar eclipse visible over a surrounding region thousands of kilometres wide. Occurring about 22 hours before perigee (on April 10, 2043, at 17:10 UTC), the Moon's apparent diameter will be larger.

It will be unusual in that while it is a total solar eclipse, it is not a central solar eclipse. A non-central eclipse is one where the center-line of totality does not intersect the surface of the Earth (when the gamma is between 0.9972 and 1.0260). Instead, the center line passes just above the Earth's surface. This rare type occurs when totality is only visible at sunset or sunrise in a polar region.

This will be the first of 43 umbral eclipses in Solar Saros 149.

== Visibility ==
The eclipse will be seen fully from Russia's Kamchatka Peninsula, Magadan Oblast and on the north-east of Yakutia (in the morning on April 10 local time). It will be visible partially throughout northeastern Russia, in Canada, Greenland, Svalbard and Iceland. It will be also partially visible from the western part United States including Alaska, Hawaii, and the North Pacific.

Settlements of total phase: Evensk, Omsukchan, Palana, Seymchan and Zyryanka.

== Images ==
Animated path

== Eclipse timing ==
=== Places experiencing total eclipse ===
Solar Eclipse of April 9, 2043 (Local Times)
Country or territory	City or place	Start of partial eclipse	Start of total eclipse	Maximum eclipse	End of total eclipse	End of partial eclipse	Duration of totality (min:s)	Duration of eclipse (hr:min)	Maximum magnitude
Russia	Evensk (Note: The times listed for this location occur on April 10, 2043, local time.)	05:18:10 (sunrise)	05:55:09	05:55:57	05:56:44	06:50:25	1:35	1:32	1.007
Russia	Zyryanka	05:39:05 (sunrise)	06:03:09	06:03:47	06:04:26	06:57:26	1:17	1:18	1.0045

=== Places experiencing partial eclipse ===
Solar Eclipse of April 9, 2043 (Local Times)
Country or territory	City or place	Start of partial eclipse	Maximum eclipse	End of partial eclipse	Duration of eclipse (hr:min)	Maximum coverage
United States	Honolulu	07:00:29	07:47:00	08:37:00	1:37	31.36%
United States Minor Outlying Islands	Midway Atoll	06:30:31 (sunrise)	06:57:06	07:49:42	1:19	59.56%
United States	Adak	08:42:03	09:37:20	10:35:54	1:54	91.65%
United States	Los Angeles	11:16:37	11:40:55	12:05:44	0:49	1.55%
United States	Unalaska	09:45:44	10:43:12	11:44:00	1:58	85.87%
United States	San Francisco	11:00:45	11:43:25	12:27:40	1:27	10.22%
Russia	Petropavlovsk-Kamchatsky	06:39:38 (sunrise)	06:47:16	07:34:26	0:55	87.98%
United States	Las Vegas	11:29:21	11:49:25	12:09:47	0:40	0.83%
Russia	Anadyr	06:05:05	07:00:29	07:58:09	1:53	96.75%
United States	Seattle	11:08:52	12:02:13	12:57:17	1:48	24.18%
Russia	Magadan	05:57:56 (sunrise)	06:02:19	06:46:33	0:49	82.23%
United States	Salt Lake City	12:35:59	13:03:09	13:30:41	0:55	2.13%
United States	Anchorage	10:03:49	11:03:41	12:06:00	2:02	74.50%
Canada	Vancouver	11:09:19	12:04:15	13:00:54	1:52	27.80%
United States	Juneau	10:08:32	11:08:44	12:11:00	2:02	55.20%
Canada	Whitehorse	11:11:48	12:12:03	13:14:11	2:02	58.54%
Canada	Calgary	12:27:03	13:17:19	14:08:23	1:41	18.69%
Canada	Edmonton	12:29:19	13:21:26	14:14:15	1:45	22.19%
Canada	Inuvik	12:24:09	13:23:37	14:24:16	2:00	64.45%
Canada	Regina	12:48:59	13:28:22	14:07:52	1:19	7.65%
Canada	Winnipeg	14:13:45	14:37:55	15:01:59	0:48	1.61%
Canada	Baker Lake	13:55:48	14:47:25	15:38:33	1:43	26.65%
Svalbard and Jan Mayen	Longyearbyen	21:08:53	21:50:13	22:05:07 (sunset)	0:56	52.74%
Greenland	Qaanaaq	18:03:48	18:56:40	19:48:46	1:45	46.04%
Canada	Pond Inlet	15:05:06	15:57:11	16:48:25	1:43	36.76%
Greenland	Pituffik	16:05:13	16:57:41	17:49:21	1:44	43.67%
Canada	Coral Harbour	14:11:28	14:57:43	15:43:06	1:32	18.66%
Greenland	Danmarkshavn	19:15:26	20:04:17	20:52:13	1:37	44.41%
Greenland	Nuuk	18:39:39	19:16:14	19:51:52	1:12	11.12%
Iceland	Reykjavík	19:44:41	20:20:47	20:42:50 (sunset)	0:58	14.68%

== Eclipse details ==
Shown below are two tables displaying details about this particular solar eclipse. The first table outlines times at which the Moon's penumbra or umbra attains the specific parameter, and the second table describes various other parameters pertaining to this eclipse.

April 9, 2043 Solar Eclipse Times
Event	Time (UTC)
First Penumbral External Contact	2043 April 9 at 16:57:34.2 UTC
First Umbral External Contact	2043 April 9 at 18:47:08.4 UTC
Greatest Eclipse	2043 April 9 at 18:57:49.4 UTC
Ecliptic Conjunction	2043 April 9 at 19:07:51.6 UTC
Last Umbral External Contact	2043 April 9 at 19:07:58.0 UTC
Equatorial Conjunction	2043 April 9 at 19:52:18.5 UTC
Last Penumbral External Contact	2043 April 9 at 20:57:40.4 UTC

April 9, 2043 Solar Eclipse Parameters
Parameter	Value
Eclipse Magnitude	1.00956
Eclipse Obscuration	-
Gamma	1.00314
Sun Right Ascension	01h13m12.2s
Sun Declination	+07°45'05.1"
Sun Semi-Diameter	15'58.1"
Sun Equatorial Horizontal Parallax	08.8"
Moon Right Ascension	01h11m17.3s
Moon Declination	+08°39'09.1"
Moon Semi-Diameter	16'38.0"
Moon Equatorial Horizontal Parallax	1°01'02.7"
ΔT	80.3 s

== Eclipse season ==
This eclipse is part of an eclipse season, a period, roughly every six months, when eclipses occur. Only two (or occasionally three) eclipse seasons occur each year, and each season lasts about 35 days and repeats just short of six months (173 days) later; thus two full eclipse seasons always occur each year. Either two or three eclipses happen each eclipse season. In the sequence below, each eclipse is separated by a fortnight.

Eclipse season of March–April 2043
March 25 Descending node (full moon)	April 9 Ascending node (new moon)
Total lunar eclipse Lunar Saros 123	Total solar eclipse Solar Saros 149

== Related eclipses ==
=== Eclipses in 2043 ===
- A total lunar eclipse on March 25.
- A non-central total solar eclipse on April 9.
- A total lunar eclipse on September 19.
- A non-central annular solar eclipse on October 3.

=== Metonic ===
- Preceded by: Solar eclipse of June 21, 2039
- Followed by: Solar eclipse of January 26, 2047

=== Tzolkinex ===
- Preceded by: Solar eclipse of February 27, 2036
- Followed by: Solar eclipse of May 20, 2050

=== Half-Saros ===
- Preceded by: Lunar eclipse of April 4, 2034
- Followed by: Lunar eclipse of April 14, 2052

=== Tritos ===
- Preceded by: Solar eclipse of May 9, 2032
- Followed by: Solar eclipse of March 9, 2054

=== Solar Saros 149 ===
- Preceded by: Solar eclipse of March 29, 2025
- Followed by: Solar eclipse of April 20, 2061

=== Inex ===
- Preceded by: Solar eclipse of April 29, 2014
- Followed by: Solar eclipse of March 19, 2072

=== Triad ===
- Preceded by: Solar eclipse of June 8, 1956
- Followed by: Solar eclipse of February 8, 2130

=== Solar eclipses of 2040–2043 ===
This eclipse is a member of a semester series. An eclipse in a semester series of solar eclipses repeats approximately every 177 days and 4 hours (a semester) at alternating nodes of the Moon's orbit.

Solar eclipse series sets from 2040 to 2043
Ascending node			Descending node		
Saros	Map	Gamma	Saros	Map	Gamma
119	May 11, 2040 Partial	−1.2529	124	November 4, 2040 Partial	1.0993
129	April 30, 2041 Total	−0.4492	134	October 25, 2041 Annular	0.4133
139	April 20, 2042 Total	0.2956	144	October 14, 2042 Annular	−0.303
149	April 9, 2043 Total (non-central)	1.0031	154	October 3, 2043 Annular (non-central)	1.0102

=== Saros 149 ===
This eclipse is a part of Saros series 149, repeating every 18 years, 11 days, 8 hours and containing 71 events. The series started with a partial solar eclipse on August 21, 1664. It contains total eclipses from April 9, 2043 through October 2, 2331; hybrid eclipses from October 13, 2349 through November 3, 2385; and annular eclipses from November 15, 2403 through July 13, 2800. The series ends at member 71 as a partial eclipse on September 28, 2926. Its eclipses are tabulated in three columns; every third eclipse in the same column is one exeligmos apart, so they all cast shadows over approximately the same parts of the Earth.

The longest duration of totality will be produced by member 31 at 4 minutes, 10 seconds on July 17, 2205, and the longest duration of annularity will be produced by member 62 at 5 minutes, 6 seconds on June 21, 2764. All eclipses in this series occur at the Moon’s ascending node of orbit.

Series members 9–30 occur between 1801 and 2200:
9	10	11
November 18, 1808	November 29, 1826	December 9, 1844
12	13	14
December 21, 1862	December 31, 1880	January 11, 1899
15	16	17
January 23, 1917	February 3, 1935	February 14, 1953
18	19	20
February 25, 1971	March 7, 1989	March 19, 2007
21	22	23
March 29, 2025	April 9, 2043	April 20, 2061
24	25	26
May 1, 2079	May 11, 2097	May 24, 2115
27	28	29
June 3, 2133	June 14, 2151	June 25, 2169
30
July 6, 2187

=== Metonic series ===
The metonic series repeats eclipses every 19 years (6939.69 days), lasting about 5 cycles. Eclipses occur in nearly the same calendar date. In addition, the octon subseries repeats 1/5 of that or every 3.8 years (1387.94 days). All eclipses in this table occur at the Moon's ascending node.

21 eclipse events between June 21, 1982 and June 21, 2058
June 21	April 8–9	January 26	November 13–14	September 1–2
117	119	121	123	125
June 21, 1982	April 9, 1986	January 26, 1990	November 13, 1993	September 2, 1997
127	129	131	133	135
June 21, 2001	April 8, 2005	January 26, 2009	November 13, 2012	September 1, 2016
137	139	141	143	145
June 21, 2020	April 8, 2024	January 26, 2028	November 14, 2031	September 2, 2035
147	149	151	153	155
June 21, 2039	April 9, 2043	January 26, 2047	November 14, 2050	September 2, 2054
157
June 21, 2058

=== Tritos series ===
This eclipse is a part of a tritos cycle, repeating at alternating nodes every 135 synodic months (≈ 3986.63 days, or 11 years minus 1 month). Their appearance and longitude are irregular due to a lack of synchronization with the anomalistic month (period of perigee), but groupings of 3 tritos cycles (≈ 33 years minus 3 months) come close (≈ 434.044 anomalistic months), so eclipses are similar in these groupings.

Series members between 1801 and 2200
February 21, 1803 (Saros 127)	January 21, 1814 (Saros 128)	December 20, 1824 (Saros 129)	November 20, 1835 (Saros 130)	October 20, 1846 (Saros 131)
September 18, 1857 (Saros 132)	August 18, 1868 (Saros 133)	July 19, 1879 (Saros 134)	June 17, 1890 (Saros 135)	May 18, 1901 (Saros 136)
April 17, 1912 (Saros 137)	March 17, 1923 (Saros 138)	February 14, 1934 (Saros 139)	January 14, 1945 (Saros 140)	December 14, 1955 (Saros 141)
November 12, 1966 (Saros 142)	October 12, 1977 (Saros 143)	September 11, 1988 (Saros 144)	August 11, 1999 (Saros 145)	July 11, 2010 (Saros 146)
June 10, 2021 (Saros 147)	May 9, 2032 (Saros 148)	April 9, 2043 (Saros 149)	March 9, 2054 (Saros 150)	February 5, 2065 (Saros 151)
January 6, 2076 (Saros 152)	December 6, 2086 (Saros 153)	November 4, 2097 (Saros 154)	October 5, 2108 (Saros 155)	September 5, 2119 (Saros 156)
August 4, 2130 (Saros 157)	July 3, 2141 (Saros 158)	June 3, 2152 (Saros 159)		April 1, 2174 (Saros 161)

=== Inex series ===
This eclipse is a part of the long period inex cycle, repeating at alternating nodes, every 358 synodic months (≈ 10,571.95 days, or 29 years minus 20 days). Their appearance and longitude are irregular due to a lack of synchronization with the anomalistic month (period of perigee). However, groupings of 3 inex cycles (≈ 87 years minus 2 months) comes close (≈ 1,151.02 anomalistic months), so eclipses are similar in these groupings.

Series members between 1801 and 2200
September 17, 1811 (Saros 141)	August 27, 1840 (Saros 142)	August 7, 1869 (Saros 143)
July 18, 1898 (Saros 144)	June 29, 1927 (Saros 145)	June 8, 1956 (Saros 146)
May 19, 1985 (Saros 147)	April 29, 2014 (Saros 148)	April 9, 2043 (Saros 149)
March 19, 2072 (Saros 150)	February 28, 2101 (Saros 151)	February 8, 2130 (Saros 152)
January 19, 2159 (Saros 153)	December 29, 2187 (Saros 154)	
