= Solar eclipse of May 31, 2068 =

Total eclipse

- Total eclipse
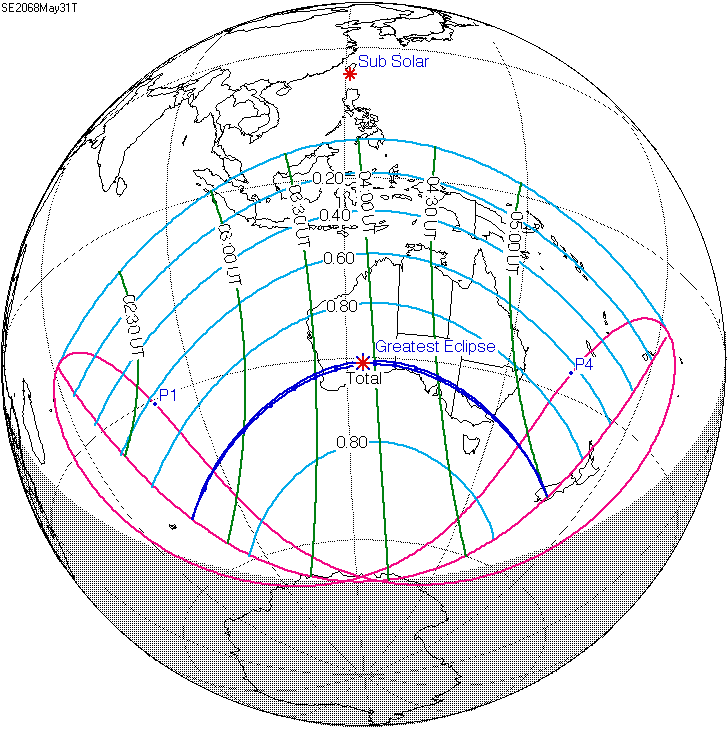
- Map
- Gamma: −0.797
- Magnitude: 1.011

Maximum eclipse
- Duration: 66 s (1 min 6 s)
- Coordinates: 31°S 123.2°E
- Max. width of band: 63 km (39 mi)

Times (UTC)
- Greatest eclipse: 3:56:39

References
- Saros: 148 (24 of 75)
- Catalog # (SE5000): 9660

A total solar eclipse will occur at the Moon's descending node of orbit on Thursday, May 31, 2068, with a magnitude of 1.011. A solar eclipse occurs when the Moon passes between Earth and the Sun, thereby totally or partly obscuring the image of the Sun for a viewer on Earth. A total solar eclipse occurs when the Moon's apparent diameter is larger than the Sun's, blocking all direct sunlight, turning day into darkness. Totality occurs in a narrow path across Earth's surface, with the partial solar eclipse visible over a surrounding region thousands of kilometres wide. Occurring about 4.7 days after perigee (on May 26, 2068, at 10:10 UTC), the Moon's apparent diameter will be larger.

The path of totality will be visible from parts of Australia and New Zealand. A partial solar eclipse will also be visible for parts of Australia, Indonesia, Antarctica, and western Oceania.

== Eclipse details ==
Shown below are two tables displaying details about this particular solar eclipse. The first table outlines times at which the Moon's penumbra or umbra attains the specific parameter, and the second table describes various other parameters pertaining to this eclipse.

May 31, 2068 Solar Eclipse Times
Event	Time (UTC)
First Penumbral External Contact	2068 May 31 at 01:32:00.7 UTC
First Umbral External Contact	2068 May 31 at 02:50:55.9 UTC
First Central Line	2068 May 31 at 02:50:59.6 UTC
First Umbral Internal Contact	2068 May 31 at 02:51:03.4 UTC
Equatorial Conjunction	2068 May 31 at 03:52:45.4 UTC
Greatest Duration	2068 May 31 at 03:54:49.9 UTC
Greatest Eclipse	2068 May 31 at 03:56:39.1 UTC
Ecliptic Conjunction	2068 May 31 at 04:05:16.2 UTC
Last Umbral Internal Contact	2068 May 31 at 05:02:20.5 UTC
Last Central Line	2068 May 31 at 05:02:21.5 UTC
Last Umbral External Contact	2068 May 31 at 05:02:22.5 UTC
Last Penumbral External Contact	2068 May 31 at 06:21:24.8 UTC

May 31, 2068 Solar Eclipse Parameters
Parameter	Value
Eclipse Magnitude	1.01098
Eclipse Obscuration	1.02209
Gamma	−0.79704
Sun Right Ascension	04h35m49.8s
Sun Declination	+22°01'13.9"
Sun Semi-Diameter	15'46.5"
Sun Equatorial Horizontal Parallax	08.7"
Moon Right Ascension	04h35m58.7s
Moon Declination	+21°15'11.0"
Moon Semi-Diameter	15'47.8"
Moon Equatorial Horizontal Parallax	0°57'58.6"
ΔT	96.3 s

== Eclipse season ==
This eclipse is part of an eclipse season, a period, roughly every six months, when eclipses occur. Only two (or occasionally three) eclipse seasons occur each year, and each season lasts about 35 days and repeats just short of six months (173 days) later; thus two full eclipse seasons always occur each year. Either two or three eclipses happen each eclipse season. In the sequence below, each eclipse is separated by a fortnight.

Eclipse season of May 2068
May 17 Ascending node (full moon)	May 31 Descending node (new moon)
Partial lunar eclipse Lunar Saros 122	Total solar eclipse Solar Saros 148

== Related eclipses ==
=== Eclipses in 2068 ===
- A partial lunar eclipse on May 17.
- A total solar eclipse on May 31.
- A total lunar eclipse on November 9.
- A partial solar eclipse on November 24.

=== Metonic ===
- Preceded by: Solar eclipse of August 12, 2064
- Followed by: Solar eclipse of March 19, 2072

=== Tzolkinex ===
- Preceded by: Solar eclipse of April 20, 2061
- Followed by: Solar eclipse of July 13, 2075

=== Half-Saros ===
- Preceded by: Lunar eclipse of May 27, 2059
- Followed by: Lunar eclipse of June 6, 2077

=== Tritos ===
- Preceded by: Solar eclipse of July 1, 2057
- Followed by: Solar eclipse of May 1, 2079

=== Solar Saros 148 ===
- Preceded by: Solar eclipse of May 20, 2050
- Followed by: Solar eclipse of June 11, 2086

=== Inex ===
- Preceded by: Solar eclipse of June 21, 2039
- Followed by: Solar eclipse of May 11, 2097

=== Triad ===
- Preceded by: Solar eclipse of July 31, 1981
- Followed by: Solar eclipse of April 2, 2155

=== Solar eclipses of 2065–2069 ===
This eclipse is a member of a semester series. An eclipse in a semester series of solar eclipses repeats approximately every 177 days and 4 hours (a semester) at alternating nodes of the Moon's orbit.

The partial solar eclipses on February 5, 2065 and August 2, 2065 occur in the previous lunar year eclipse set, and the partial solar eclipses on April 21, 2069 and October 15, 2069 occur in the next lunar year eclipse set.

Solar eclipse series sets from 2065 to 2069
Descending node			Ascending node		
Saros	Map	Gamma	Saros	Map	Gamma
118	July 3, 2065 Partial	1.4619	123	December 27, 2065 Partial	−1.0688
128	June 22, 2066 Annular	0.733	133	December 17, 2066 Total	−0.4043
138	June 11, 2067 Annular	−0.0387	143	December 6, 2067 Hybrid	0.2845
148	May 31, 2068 Total	−0.797	153	November 24, 2068 Partial	1.0299
158	May 20, 2069 Partial	−1.4852			

=== Saros 148 ===
This eclipse is a part of Saros series 148, repeating every 18 years, 11 days, and containing 75 events. The series started with a partial solar eclipse on September 21, 1653. It contains annular eclipses on April 29, 2014 and May 9, 2032; a hybrid eclipse on May 20, 2050; and total eclipses from May 31, 2068 through August 3, 2771. The series ends at member 75 as a partial eclipse on December 12, 2987. Its eclipses are tabulated in three columns; every third eclipse in the same column is one exeligmos apart, so they all cast shadows over approximately the same parts of the Earth.

The longest duration of annularity will be produced by member 22 at 22 seconds (by default) on May 9, 2032, and the longest duration of totality will be produced by member 54 at 5 minutes, 23 seconds on April 26, 2609. All eclipses in this series occur at the Moon’s descending node of orbit.

Series members 10–31 occur between 1801 and 2200:
10	11	12
December 30, 1815	January 9, 1834	January 21, 1852
13	14	15
January 31, 1870	February 11, 1888	February 23, 1906
16	17	18
March 5, 1924	March 16, 1942	March 27, 1960
19	20	21
April 7, 1978	April 17, 1996	April 29, 2014
22	23	24
May 9, 2032	May 20, 2050	May 31, 2068
25	26	27
June 11, 2086	June 22, 2104	July 4, 2122
28	29	30
July 14, 2140	July 25, 2158	August 4, 2176
31
August 16, 2194

=== Metonic series ===
The metonic series repeats eclipses every 19 years (6939.69 days), lasting about 5 cycles. Eclipses occur in nearly the same calendar date. In addition, the octon subseries repeats 1/5 of that or every 3.8 years (1387.94 days). All eclipses in this table occur at the Moon's descending node.

22 eclipse events between June 1, 2011 and October 24, 2098
May 31–June 1	March 19–20	January 5–6	October 24–25	August 12–13
118	120	122	124	126
June 1, 2011	March 20, 2015	January 6, 2019	October 25, 2022	August 12, 2026
128	130	132	134	136
June 1, 2030	March 20, 2034	January 5, 2038	October 25, 2041	August 12, 2045
138	140	142	144	146
May 31, 2049	March 20, 2053	January 5, 2057	October 24, 2060	August 12, 2064
148	150	152	154	156
May 31, 2068	March 19, 2072	January 6, 2076	October 24, 2079	August 13, 2083
158	160	162	164	
June 1, 2087			October 24, 2098	

=== Tritos series ===
This eclipse is a part of a tritos cycle, repeating at alternating nodes every 135 synodic months (≈ 3986.63 days, or 11 years minus 1 month). Their appearance and longitude are irregular due to a lack of synchronization with the anomalistic month (period of perigee), but groupings of 3 tritos cycles (≈ 33 years minus 3 months) come close (≈ 434.044 anomalistic months), so eclipses are similar in these groupings.

Series members between 1801 and 2200
June 16, 1806 (Saros 124)	May 16, 1817 (Saros 125)	April 14, 1828 (Saros 126)	March 15, 1839 (Saros 127)	February 12, 1850 (Saros 128)
January 11, 1861 (Saros 129)	December 12, 1871 (Saros 130)	November 10, 1882 (Saros 131)	October 9, 1893 (Saros 132)	September 9, 1904 (Saros 133)
August 10, 1915 (Saros 134)	July 9, 1926 (Saros 135)	June 8, 1937 (Saros 136)	May 9, 1948 (Saros 137)	April 8, 1959 (Saros 138)
March 7, 1970 (Saros 139)	February 4, 1981 (Saros 140)	January 4, 1992 (Saros 141)	December 4, 2002 (Saros 142)	November 3, 2013 (Saros 143)
October 2, 2024 (Saros 144)	September 2, 2035 (Saros 145)	August 2, 2046 (Saros 146)	July 1, 2057 (Saros 147)	May 31, 2068 (Saros 148)
May 1, 2079 (Saros 149)	March 31, 2090 (Saros 150)	February 28, 2101 (Saros 151)	January 29, 2112 (Saros 152)	December 28, 2122 (Saros 153)
November 26, 2133 (Saros 154)	October 26, 2144 (Saros 155)	September 26, 2155 (Saros 156)	August 25, 2166 (Saros 157)	July 25, 2177 (Saros 158)
June 24, 2188 (Saros 159)	May 24, 2199 (Saros 160)			

=== Inex series ===
This eclipse is a part of the long period inex cycle, repeating at alternating nodes, every 358 synodic months (≈ 10,571.95 days, or 29 years minus 20 days). Their appearance and longitude are irregular due to a lack of synchronization with the anomalistic month (period of perigee). However, groupings of 3 inex cycles (≈ 87 years minus 2 months) comes close (≈ 1,151.02 anomalistic months), so eclipses are similar in these groupings.

Series members between 1801 and 2200
November 29, 1807 (Saros 139)	November 9, 1836 (Saros 140)	October 19, 1865 (Saros 141)
September 29, 1894 (Saros 142)	September 10, 1923 (Saros 143)	August 20, 1952 (Saros 144)
July 31, 1981 (Saros 145)	July 11, 2010 (Saros 146)	June 21, 2039 (Saros 147)
May 31, 2068 (Saros 148)	May 11, 2097 (Saros 149)	April 22, 2126 (Saros 150)
April 2, 2155 (Saros 151)	March 12, 2184 (Saros 152)	
