= Solar eclipse of July 9, 1926 =

20th-century annular solar eclipse

- Annular eclipse
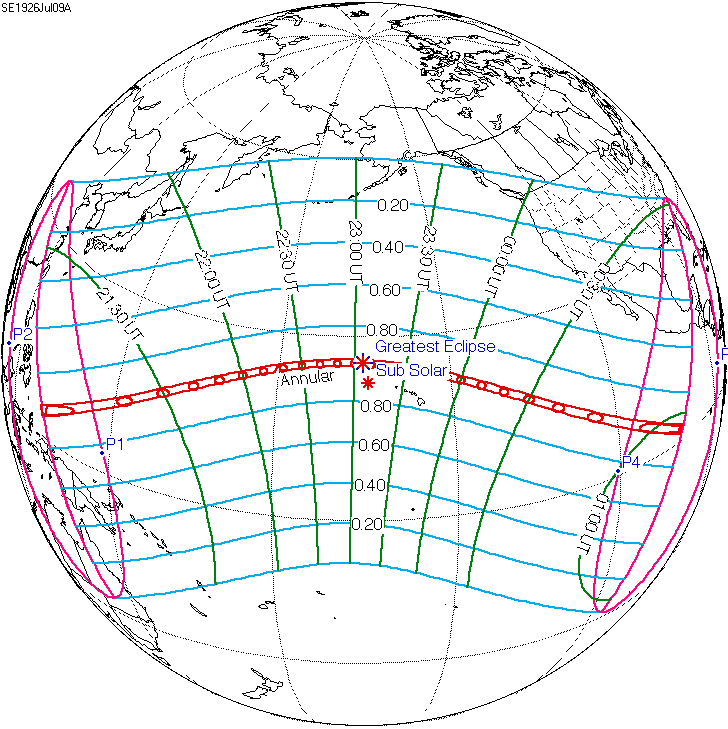
- Map
- Gamma: 0.0538
- Magnitude: 0.968

Maximum eclipse
- Duration: 231 s (3 min 51 s)
- Coordinates: 25.6°N 165.1°W
- Max. width of band: 115 km (71 mi)

Times (UTC)
- Greatest eclipse: 23:06:02

References
- Saros: 135 (34 of 71)
- Catalog # (SE5000): 9342

An annular solar eclipse occurred at the Moon's ascending node of orbit between Friday, July 9 and Saturday, July 10, 1926, with a magnitude of 0.968. A solar eclipse occurs when the Moon passes between Earth and the Sun, thereby totally or partly obscuring the image of the Sun for a viewer on Earth. An annular solar eclipse occurs when the Moon's apparent diameter is smaller than the Sun's, blocking most of the Sun's light and causing the Sun to look like an annulus (ring). An annular eclipse appears as a partial eclipse over a region of the Earth thousands of kilometres wide. Occurring about 4.3 days before apogee (on July 14, 1926, at 5:50 UTC), the Moon's apparent diameter was smaller.

Annularity was visible from the islands of Pulo Anna and Merir in Japan's South Seas Mandate (now in Palau) and Wake Island on July 10 (Saturday), and Midway Atoll on July 9 (Friday). A partial eclipse was visible for parts of Northeast Asia, northern Oceania, Hawaii, southern North America, and Central America.

== Eclipse details ==
Shown below are two tables displaying details about this particular solar eclipse. The first table outlines times at which the Moon's penumbra or umbra attains the specific parameter, and the second table describes various other parameters pertaining to this eclipse.

July 9, 1926 Solar Eclipse Times
| Event | Time (UTC) |
|---|---|
| First Penumbral External Contact | 1926 July 9 at 20:05:21.4 UTC |
| First Umbral External Contact | 1926 July 9 at 21:08:43.5 UTC |
| First Central Line | 1926 July 9 at 21:10:16.8 UTC |
| First Umbral Internal Contact | 1926 July 9 at 21:11:50.1 UTC |
| First Penumbral Internal Contact | 1926 July 9 at 22:15:23.2 UTC |
| Equatorial Conjunction | 1926 July 9 at 23:05:52.4 UTC |
| Greatest Eclipse | 1926 July 9 at 23:06:02.0 UTC |
| Ecliptic Conjunction | 1926 July 9 at 23:06:39.5 UTC |
| Greatest Duration | 1926 July 9 at 23:08:37.8 UTC |
| Last Penumbral Internal Contact | 1926 July 9 at 23:56:40.1 UTC |
| Last Umbral Internal Contact | 1926 July 10 at 01:00:12.3 UTC |
| Last Central Line | 1926 July 10 at 01:01:48.0 UTC |
| Last Umbral External Contact | 1926 July 10 at 01:03:23.6 UTC |
| Last Penumbral External Contact | 1926 July 10 at 02:06:47.9 UTC |

July 9, 1926 Solar Eclipse Parameters
| Parameter | Value |
|---|---|
| Eclipse Magnitude | 0.96799 |
| Eclipse Obscuration | 0.93701 |
| Gamma | 0.05379 |
| Sun Right Ascension | 07h13m29.8s |
| Sun Declination | +22°22'23.4" |
| Sun Semi-Diameter | 15'43.9" |
| Sun Equatorial Horizontal Parallax | 08.6" |
| Moon Right Ascension | 07h13m30.1s |
| Moon Declination | +22°25'20.5" |
| Moon Semi-Diameter | 14'59.8" |
| Moon Equatorial Horizontal Parallax | 0°55'02.2" |
| ΔT | 24.2 s |

== Eclipse season ==
This eclipse is part of an eclipse season, a period, roughly every six months, when eclipses occur. Only two (or occasionally three) eclipse seasons occur each year, and each season lasts about 35 days and repeats just short of six months (173 days) later; thus two full eclipse seasons always occur each year. Either two or three eclipses happen each eclipse season. In the sequence below, each eclipse is separated by a fortnight. The first and last eclipse in this sequence is separated by one synodic month.

Eclipse season of June–July 1926
| June 25 Descending node (full moon) | July 9 Ascending node (new moon) | July 25 Descending node (full moon) |
|---|---|---|
| Penumbral lunar eclipse Lunar Saros 109 | Total solar eclipse Solar Saros 135 | Penumbral lunar eclipse Lunar Saros 147 |

== Related eclipses ==
=== Eclipses in 1926 ===
- A total solar eclipse on January 14.
- A penumbral lunar eclipse on January 28.
- A penumbral lunar eclipse on June 25.
- An annular solar eclipse on July 9.
- A penumbral lunar eclipse on July 25.
- A penumbral lunar eclipse on December 19.

=== Metonic ===
- Preceded by: Solar eclipse of September 21, 1922
- Followed by: Solar eclipse of April 28, 1930

=== Tzolkinex ===
- Preceded by: Solar eclipse of May 29, 1919
- Followed by: Solar eclipse of August 21, 1933

=== Half-Saros ===
- Preceded by: Lunar eclipse of July 4, 1917
- Followed by: Lunar eclipse of July 16, 1935

=== Tritos ===
- Preceded by: Solar eclipse of August 10, 1915
- Followed by: Solar eclipse of June 8, 1937

=== Solar Saros 135 ===
- Preceded by: Solar eclipse of June 28, 1908
- Followed by: Solar eclipse of July 20, 1944

=== Inex ===
- Preceded by: Solar eclipse of July 29, 1897
- Followed by: Solar eclipse of June 20, 1955

=== Triad ===
- Preceded by: Solar eclipse of September 7, 1839
- Followed by: Solar eclipse of May 10, 2013

=== Solar eclipses of 1924–1928 ===
This eclipse is a member of a semester series. An eclipse in a semester series of solar eclipses repeats approximately every 177 days and 4 hours (a semester) at alternating nodes of the Moon's orbit.

The partial solar eclipses on March 5, 1924 and August 30, 1924 occur in the previous lunar year eclipse set, and the solar eclipses on May 19, 1928 and November 12, 1928 occur in the next lunar year eclipse set.

Solar eclipse series sets from 1924 to 1928
| Ascending node | | | Descending node | | |
| Saros | Map | Gamma | Saros | Map | Gamma |
| 115 | July 31, 1924 Partial | −1.4459 | 120 | January 24, 1925 Total | 0.8661 |
| 125 | July 20, 1925 Annular | −0.7193 | 130 Totality in Sumatra, Indonesia | January 14, 1926 Total | 0.1973 |
| 135 | July 9, 1926 Annular | 0.0538 | 140 | January 3, 1927 Annular | −0.4956 |
| 145 | June 29, 1927 Total | 0.8163 | 150 | December 24, 1927 Partial | −1.2416 |
| 155 | June 17, 1928 Partial | 1.5107 | | | |

=== Saros 135 ===
This eclipse is a part of Saros series 135, repeating every 18 years, 11 days, and containing 71 events. The series started with a partial solar eclipse on July 5, 1331. It contains annular eclipses from October 21, 1511 through February 24, 2305; hybrid eclipses on March 8, 2323 and March 18, 2341; and total eclipses from March 29, 2359 through May 22, 2449. The series ends at member 71 as a partial eclipse on August 17, 2593. Its eclipses are tabulated in three columns; every third eclipse in the same column is one exeligmos apart, so they all cast shadows over approximately the same parts of the Earth.

The longest duration of annularity was produced by member 16 at 10 minutes, 41 seconds on December 24, 1601, and the longest duration of totality will be produced by member 62 at 2 minutes, 27 seconds on May 12, 2431. All eclipses in this series occur at the Moon’s ascending node of orbit.

Series members 28–49 occur between 1801 and 2200:
| 28 | 29 | 30 |
|---|---|---|
| May 5, 1818 | May 15, 1836 | May 26, 1854 |
| 31 | 32 | 33 |
| June 6, 1872 | June 17, 1890 | June 28, 1908 |
| 34 | 35 | 36 |
| July 9, 1926 | July 20, 1944 | July 31, 1962 |
| 37 | 38 | 39 |
| August 10, 1980 | August 22, 1998 | September 1, 2016 |
| 40 | 42 | 42 |
| September 12, 2034 | September 22, 2052 | October 4, 2070 |
| 43 | 44 | 45 |
| October 14, 2088 | October 26, 2106 | November 6, 2124 |
| 46 | 47 | 48 |
| November 17, 2142 | November 27, 2160 | December 9, 2178 |
49
December 19, 2196

=== Metonic series ===
The metonic series repeats eclipses every 19 years (6939.69 days), lasting about 5 cycles. Eclipses occur in nearly the same calendar date. In addition, the octon subseries repeats 1/5 of that or every 3.8 years (1387.94 days). All eclipses in this table occur at the Moon's ascending node.

22 eclipse events between December 2, 1880 and July 9, 1964
| December 2–3 | September 20–21 | July 9–10 | April 26–28 | February 13–14 |
| 111 | 113 | 115 | 117 | 119 |
|---|---|---|---|---|
| December 2, 1880 | | July 9, 1888 | April 26, 1892 | February 13, 1896 |
| 121 | 123 | 125 | 127 | 129 |
| December 3, 1899 | September 21, 1903 | July 10, 1907 | April 28, 1911 | February 14, 1915 |
| 131 | 133 | 135 | 137 | 139 |
| December 3, 1918 | September 21, 1922 | July 9, 1926 | April 28, 1930 | February 14, 1934 |
| 141 | 143 | 145 | 147 | 149 |
| December 2, 1937 | September 21, 1941 | July 9, 1945 | April 28, 1949 | February 14, 1953 |
| 151 | 153 | 155 | | |
| December 2, 1956 | September 20, 1960 | July 9, 1964 | | |

=== Tritos series ===
This eclipse is a part of a tritos cycle, repeating at alternating nodes every 135 synodic months (≈ 3986.63 days, or 11 years minus 1 month). Their appearance and longitude are irregular due to a lack of synchronization with the anomalistic month (period of perigee), but groupings of 3 tritos cycles (≈ 33 years minus 3 months) come close (≈ 434.044 anomalistic months), so eclipses are similar in these groupings.

Series members between 1801 and 2200
| June 16, 1806 (Saros 124) | May 16, 1817 (Saros 125) | April 14, 1828 (Saros 126) | March 15, 1839 (Saros 127) | February 12, 1850 (Saros 128) |
| January 11, 1861 (Saros 129) | December 12, 1871 (Saros 130) | November 10, 1882 (Saros 131) | October 9, 1893 (Saros 132) | September 9, 1904 (Saros 133) |
| August 10, 1915 (Saros 134) | July 9, 1926 (Saros 135) | June 8, 1937 (Saros 136) | May 9, 1948 (Saros 137) | April 8, 1959 (Saros 138) |
| March 7, 1970 (Saros 139) | February 4, 1981 (Saros 140) | January 4, 1992 (Saros 141) | December 4, 2002 (Saros 142) | November 3, 2013 (Saros 143) |
| October 2, 2024 (Saros 144) | September 2, 2035 (Saros 145) | August 2, 2046 (Saros 146) | July 1, 2057 (Saros 147) | May 31, 2068 (Saros 148) |
| May 1, 2079 (Saros 149) | March 31, 2090 (Saros 150) | February 28, 2101 (Saros 151) | January 29, 2112 (Saros 152) | December 28, 2122 (Saros 153) |
| November 26, 2133 (Saros 154) | October 26, 2144 (Saros 155) | September 26, 2155 (Saros 156) | August 25, 2166 (Saros 157) | July 25, 2177 (Saros 158) |
| June 24, 2188 (Saros 159) | May 24, 2199 (Saros 160) | | | |

=== Inex series ===
This eclipse is a part of the long period inex cycle, repeating at alternating nodes, every 358 synodic months (≈ 10,571.95 days, or 29 years minus 20 days). Their appearance and longitude are irregular due to a lack of synchronization with the anomalistic month (period of perigee). However, groupings of 3 inex cycles (≈ 87 years minus 2 months) comes close (≈ 1,151.02 anomalistic months), so eclipses are similar in these groupings.

Series members between 1801 and 2200
| September 28, 1810 (Saros 131) | September 7, 1839 (Saros 132) | August 18, 1868 (Saros 133) |
| July 29, 1897 (Saros 134) | July 9, 1926 (Saros 135) | June 20, 1955 (Saros 136) |
| May 30, 1984 (Saros 137) | May 10, 2013 (Saros 138) | April 20, 2042 (Saros 139) |
| March 31, 2071 (Saros 140) | March 10, 2100 (Saros 141) | February 18, 2129 (Saros 142) |
| January 30, 2158 (Saros 143) | January 9, 2187 (Saros 144) | |
