= Solar eclipse of March 7, 1989 =

20th-century partial solar eclipse

- Partial eclipse
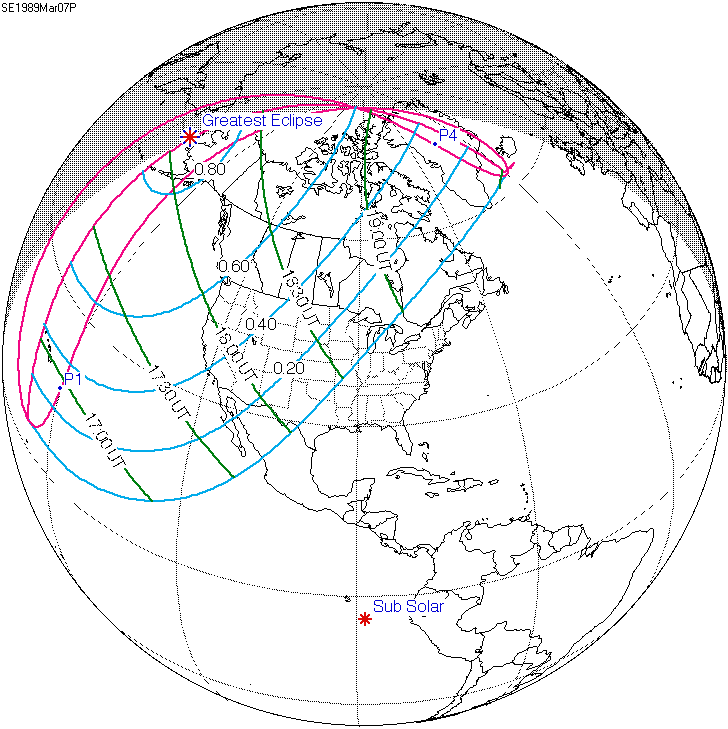
- Map
- Gamma: 1.0981
- Magnitude: 0.8268

Maximum eclipse
- Coordinates: 61.2°N 169.8°W

Times (UTC)
- Greatest eclipse: 18:08:41

References
- Saros: 149 (19 of 71)
- Catalog # (SE5000): 9484

A partial solar eclipse occurred at the Moon's ascending node of orbit on Tuesday, March 7, 1989, with a magnitude of 0.8268. A solar eclipse occurs when the Moon passes between Earth and the Sun, thereby totally or partly obscuring the image of the Sun for a viewer on Earth. A partial solar eclipse occurs in the polar regions of the Earth when the center of the Moon's shadow misses the Earth.

A partial eclipse was visible for parts of Hawaii, Alaska, Canada, the western and central United States, northwest Mexico, and Greenland.

== Eclipse timing ==
=== Places experiencing partial eclipse ===
Solar eclipse of March 7, 1989 (local times)
Country or territory	City or place	Start of partial eclipse	Maximum eclipse	End of partial eclipse	Duration of eclipse (hr:min)	Maximum coverage
United States	Honolulu	06:46:48 (sunrise)	07:02:00	07:48:31	1:02	27.28%
Mexico	Tijuana	08:55:27	09:48:30	10:44:00	1:49	21.41%
Mexico	Hermosillo	10:06:57	10:49:28	11:33:21	1:26	8.98%
United States	Los Angeles	08:54:54	09:49:56	10:47:36	1:53	25.15%
United States	San Francisco	08:53:22	09:52:09	10:54:03	2:01	35.72%
United States	Unalaska	08:39:23 (sunrise)	08:54:34	09:53:03	1:14	77.06%
United States	Phoenix	10:06:27	10:56:18	11:47:52	1:41	15.90%
United States	Las Vegas	09:02:39	09:57:27	10:54:27	1:52	23.73%
United States	Seattle	09:08:02	10:09:34	11:13:37	2:06	47.13%
United States	Salt Lake City	10:13:51	11:09:39	12:07:05	1:53	25.12%
Canada	Vancouver	09:09:48	10:11:34	11:15:47	2:06	49.65%
United States	Anchorage	08:14:28	09:13:15	10:14:35	2:00	75.27%
United States	Denver	10:28:02	11:16:38	12:06:01	1:38	14.12%
United States	Oklahoma City	11:56:27	12:19:39	12:42:56	0:46	1.21%
Canada	Whitehorse	09:19:44	10:20:24	11:23:13	2:03	67.14%
United States	Adak	08:18:04 (sunrise)	08:21:41	08:45:45	0:28	29.23%
Canada	Calgary	10:23:10	11:23:24	12:25:04	2:02	40.22%
Canada	Edmonton	10:27:12	11:27:28	12:28:58	2:02	42.03%
Canada	Inuvik	10:33:26	11:32:28	12:32:51	1:59	66.11%
Canada	Regina	11:36:58	12:32:49	13:29:12	1:52	27.21%
United States	Minneapolis	12:01:52	12:39:41	13:17:22	1:16	6.30%
Canada	Winnipeg	11:51:06	12:40:42	13:30:14	1:39	16.99%
Canada	Baker Lake	11:58:04	12:53:10	13:48:01	1:50	34.69%
Russia	Mys Shmidta (Note: The times listed for this location occur on March 8, 1989, local time.)	06:52:12 (sunrise)	06:58:18	07:16:27	0:24	19.96%
Russia	Anadyr	06:56:15 (sunrise)	07:02:20	07:08:31	0:12	4.17%
Canada	Coral Harbour	13:13:16	14:02:44	14:51:31	1:38	23.41%
Canada	Pond Inlet	13:13:59	14:04:54	14:55:13	1:41	32.74%
Greenland	Qaanaaq	15:15:42	16:05:54	16:55:32	1:40	35.76%
Greenland	Pituffik	14:16:48	15:06:40	15:55:56	1:39	34.15%
Greenland	Nuuk	15:51:53	16:22:06	16:51:46	1:00	5.58%

== Eclipse details ==
Shown below are two tables displaying details about this particular solar eclipse. The first table outlines times at which the Moon's penumbra or umbra attains the specific parameter, and the second table describes various other parameters pertaining to this eclipse.

March 7, 1989 solar eclipse times
Event	Time (UTC)
First penumbral external contact	1989 March 7 at 16:17:48.4 UTC
Greatest eclipse	1989 March 7 at 18:08:40.6 UTC
Ecliptic conjunction	1989 March 7 at 18:19:36.5 UTC
Equatorial conjunction	1989 March 7 at 19:09:59.8 UTC
Last penumbral external contact	1989 March 7 at 19:59:06.7 UTC

March 7, 1989 solar eclipse parameters
Parameter	Value
Eclipse magnitude	0.82679
Eclipse obscuration	0.78906
Gamma	1.09815
Sun right ascension	23h12m43.3s
Sun declination	-05°04'32.2"
Sun semi-diameter	16'06.8"
Sun equatorial horizontal parallax	08.9"
Moon right ascension	23h10m35.2s
Moon declination	-04°05'29.6"
Moon semi-diameter	16'41.7"
Moon equatorial horizontal parallax	1°01'16.5"
ΔT	56.4 s

== Eclipse season ==
This eclipse is part of an eclipse season, a period, roughly every six months, when eclipses occur. Only two (or occasionally three) eclipse seasons occur each year, and each season lasts about 35 days and repeats just short of six months (173 days) later; thus two full eclipse seasons always occur each year. Either two or three eclipses happen each eclipse season. In the sequence below, each eclipse is separated by a fortnight.

Eclipse season of February–March 1989
February 20 Descending node (full moon)	March 7 Ascending node (new moon)
Total lunar eclipse Lunar Saros 123	Partial solar eclipse Solar Saros 149

== Related eclipses ==
=== Eclipses in 1989 ===
- A total lunar eclipse on February 20
- A partial solar eclipse on March 7
- A total lunar eclipse on August 17
- A partial solar eclipse on August 31

=== Metonic ===
- Preceded by: Solar eclipse of May 19, 1985
- Followed by: Solar eclipse of December 24, 1992

=== Tzolkinex ===
- Preceded by: Solar eclipse of January 25, 1982
- Followed by: Solar eclipse of April 17, 1996

=== Half-Saros ===
- Preceded by: Lunar eclipse of March 1, 1980
- Followed by: Lunar eclipse of March 13, 1998

=== Tritos ===
- Preceded by: Solar eclipse of April 7, 1978
- Followed by: Solar eclipse of February 5, 2000

=== Solar Saros 149 ===
- Preceded by: Solar eclipse of February 25, 1971
- Followed by: Solar eclipse of March 19, 2007

=== Inex ===
- Preceded by: Solar eclipse of March 27, 1960
- Followed by: Solar eclipse of February 15, 2018

=== Triad ===
- Preceded by: Solar eclipse of May 7, 1902
- Followed by: Solar eclipse of January 6, 2076

=== Solar eclipses of 1986–1989 ===
This eclipse is a member of a semester series. An eclipse in a semester series of solar eclipses repeats approximately every 177 days and 4 hours (a semester) at alternating nodes of the Moon's orbit.

Solar eclipse series sets from 1986 to 1989
Ascending node			Descending node		
Saros	Map	Gamma	Saros	Map	Gamma
119	April 9, 1986 Partial	−1.0822	124	October 3, 1986 Hybrid	0.9931
129	March 29, 1987 Hybrid	−0.3053	134	September 23, 1987 Annular	0.2787
139	March 18, 1988 Total	0.4188	144	September 11, 1988 Annular	−0.4681
149	March 7, 1989 Partial	1.0981	154	August 31, 1989 Partial	−1.1928

=== Saros 149 ===
This eclipse is a part of Saros series 149, repeating every 18 years, 11 days, 8 hours and containing 71 events. The series started with a partial solar eclipse on August 21, 1664. It contains total eclipses from April 9, 2043 through October 2, 2331; hybrid eclipses from October 13, 2349 through November 3, 2385; and annular eclipses from November 15, 2403 through July 13, 2800. The series ends at member 71 as a partial eclipse on September 28, 2926. Its eclipses are tabulated in three columns; every third eclipse in the same column is one exeligmos apart, so they all cast shadows over approximately the same parts of the Earth.

The longest duration of totality will be produced by member 31 at 4 minutes, 10 seconds on July 17, 2205, and the longest duration of annularity will be produced by member 62 at 5 minutes, 6 seconds on June 21, 2764. All eclipses in this series occur at the Moon’s ascending node of orbit.

Series members 9–30 occur between 1801 and 2200:
9	10	11
November 18, 1808	November 29, 1826	December 9, 1844
12	13	14
December 21, 1862	December 31, 1880	January 11, 1899
15	16	17
January 23, 1917	February 3, 1935	February 14, 1953
18	19	20
February 25, 1971	March 7, 1989	March 19, 2007
21	22	23
March 29, 2025	April 9, 2043	April 20, 2061
24	25	26
May 1, 2079	May 11, 2097	May 24, 2115
27	28	29
June 3, 2133	June 14, 2151	June 25, 2169
30
July 6, 2187

=== Metonic series ===
The metonic series repeats eclipses every 19 years (6939.69 days), lasting about 5 cycles. Eclipses occur in nearly the same calendar date. In addition, the octon subseries repeats 1/5 of that or every 3.8 years (1387.94 days). All eclipses in this table occur at the Moon's ascending node.

22 eclipse events between December 24, 1916 and July 31, 2000
December 24–25	October 12	July 31–August 1	May 19–20	March 7
111	113	115	117	119
December 24, 1916		July 31, 1924	May 19, 1928	March 7, 1932
121	123	125	127	129
December 25, 1935	October 12, 1939	August 1, 1943	May 20, 1947	March 7, 1951
131	133	135	137	139
December 25, 1954	October 12, 1958	July 31, 1962	May 20, 1966	March 7, 1970
141	143	145	147	149
December 24, 1973	October 12, 1977	July 31, 1981	May 19, 1985	March 7, 1989
151	153	155		
December 24, 1992	October 12, 1996	July 31, 2000		

=== Tritos series ===
This eclipse is a part of a tritos cycle, repeating at alternating nodes every 135 synodic months (≈ 3986.63 days, or 11 years minus 1 month). Their appearance and longitude are irregular due to a lack of synchronization with the anomalistic month (period of perigee), but groupings of 3 tritos cycles (≈ 33 years minus 3 months) come close (≈ 434.044 anomalistic months), so eclipses are similar in these groupings.

Series members between 1801 and 2087
August 17, 1803 (Saros 132)	July 17, 1814 (Saros 133)	June 16, 1825 (Saros 134)	May 15, 1836 (Saros 135)	April 15, 1847 (Saros 136)
March 15, 1858 (Saros 137)	February 11, 1869 (Saros 138)	January 11, 1880 (Saros 139)	December 12, 1890 (Saros 140)	November 11, 1901 (Saros 141)
October 10, 1912 (Saros 142)	September 10, 1923 (Saros 143)	August 10, 1934 (Saros 144)	July 9, 1945 (Saros 145)	June 8, 1956 (Saros 146)
May 9, 1967 (Saros 147)	April 7, 1978 (Saros 148)	March 7, 1989 (Saros 149)	February 5, 2000 (Saros 150)	January 4, 2011 (Saros 151)
December 4, 2021 (Saros 152)	November 3, 2032 (Saros 153)	October 3, 2043 (Saros 154)	September 2, 2054 (Saros 155)	August 2, 2065 (Saros 156)
July 1, 2076 (Saros 157)	June 1, 2087 (Saros 158)			

=== Inex series ===
This eclipse is a part of the long period inex cycle, repeating at alternating nodes, every 358 synodic months (≈ 10,571.95 days, or 29 years minus 20 days). Their appearance and longitude are irregular due to a lack of synchronization with the anomalistic month (period of perigee). However, groupings of 3 inex cycles (≈ 87 years minus 2 months) comes close (≈ 1,151.02 anomalistic months), so eclipses are similar in these groupings.

Series members between 1801 and 2200
July 6, 1815 (Saros 143)	June 16, 1844 (Saros 144)	May 26, 1873 (Saros 145)
May 7, 1902 (Saros 146)	April 18, 1931 (Saros 147)	March 27, 1960 (Saros 148)
March 7, 1989 (Saros 149)	February 15, 2018 (Saros 150)	January 26, 2047 (Saros 151)
January 6, 2076 (Saros 152)	December 17, 2104 (Saros 153)	November 26, 2133 (Saros 154)
November 7, 2162 (Saros 155)	October 18, 2191 (Saros 156)	
