= Solar eclipse of June 11, 2086 =

Total eclipse

- Total eclipse
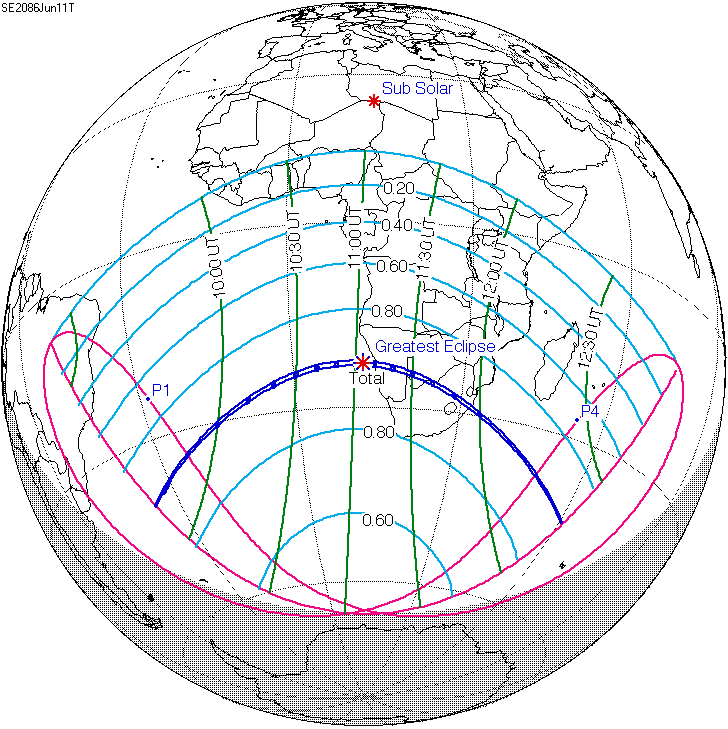
- Map
- Gamma: −0.7215
- Magnitude: 1.0174

Maximum eclipse
- Duration: 108 s (1 min 48 s)
- Coordinates: 23.2°S 12.5°E
- Max. width of band: 86 km (53 mi)

Times (UTC)
- Greatest eclipse: 11:07:14

References
- Saros: 148 (25 of 75)
- Catalog # (SE5000): 9701

A total solar eclipse will occur at the Moon's descending node of orbit on Tuesday, June 11, 2086, with a magnitude of 1.0174. A solar eclipse occurs when the Moon passes between Earth and the Sun, thereby totally or partly obscuring the image of the Sun for a viewer on Earth. A total solar eclipse occurs when the Moon's apparent diameter is larger than the Sun's, blocking all direct sunlight, turning day into darkness. Totality occurs in a narrow path across Earth's surface, with the partial solar eclipse visible over a surrounding region thousands of kilometres wide. Occurring about 4.4 days after perigee (on June 7, 2086, at 2:30 UTC), the Moon's apparent diameter will be larger.

The path of totality will be visible from parts of Namibia, Botswana, and South Africa. A partial solar eclipse will also be visible for parts of eastern Brazil, Southern Africa, and Central Africa.

== Eclipse details ==
Shown below are two tables displaying details about this particular solar eclipse. The first table outlines times at which the Moon's penumbra or umbra attains the specific parameter, and the second table describes various other parameters pertaining to this eclipse.

June 11, 2086 Solar Eclipse Times
Event	Time (UTC)
First Penumbral External Contact	2086 June 11 at 08:38:38.2 UTC
First Umbral External Contact	2086 June 11 at 09:51:48.2 UTC
First Central Line	2086 June 11 at 09:52:03.8 UTC
First Umbral Internal Contact	2086 June 11 at 09:52:19.5 UTC
Greatest Duration	2086 June 11 at 11:05:08.5 UTC
Greatest Eclipse	2086 June 11 at 11:07:13.9 UTC
Equatorial Conjunction	2086 June 11 at 11:09:41.4 UTC
Ecliptic Conjunction	2086 June 11 at 11:15:00.5 UTC
Last Umbral Internal Contact	2086 June 11 at 12:22:09.7 UTC
Last Central Line	2086 June 11 at 12:22:22.6 UTC
Last Umbral External Contact	2086 June 11 at 12:22:35.5 UTC
Last Penumbral External Contact	2086 June 11 at 13:35:54.0 UTC

June 11, 2086 Solar Eclipse Parameters
Parameter	Value
Eclipse Magnitude	1.01736
Eclipse Obscuration	1.03502
Gamma	−0.72150
Sun Right Ascension	05h20m59.8s
Sun Declination	+23°07'28.2"
Sun Semi-Diameter	15'45.2"
Sun Equatorial Horizontal Parallax	08.7"
Moon Right Ascension	05h20m54.1s
Moon Declination	+22°25'37.5"
Moon Semi-Diameter	15'51.0"
Moon Equatorial Horizontal Parallax	0°58'10.3"
ΔT	110.9 s

== Eclipse season ==
This eclipse is part of an eclipse season, a period, roughly every six months, when eclipses occur. Only two (or occasionally three) eclipse seasons occur each year, and each season lasts about 35 days and repeats just short of six months (173 days) later; thus two full eclipse seasons always occur each year. Either two or three eclipses happen each eclipse season. In the sequence below, each eclipse is separated by a fortnight.

Eclipse season of May–June 2086
May 28 Ascending node (full moon)	June 11 Descending node (new moon)
Partial lunar eclipse Lunar Saros 122	Total solar eclipse Solar Saros 148

== Related eclipses ==
=== Eclipses in 2086 ===
- A partial lunar eclipse on May 28.
- A total solar eclipse on June 11.
- A partial lunar eclipse on November 20.
- A partial solar eclipse on December 6.

=== Metonic ===
- Preceded by: Solar eclipse of August 24, 2082
- Followed by: Solar eclipse of March 31, 2090

=== Tzolkinex ===
- Preceded by: Solar eclipse of May 1, 2079
- Followed by: Solar eclipse of July 23, 2093

=== Half-Saros ===
- Preceded by: Lunar eclipse of June 6, 2077
- Followed by: Lunar eclipse of June 17, 2095

=== Tritos ===
- Preceded by: Solar eclipse of July 13, 2075
- Followed by: Solar eclipse of May 11, 2097

=== Solar Saros 148 ===
- Preceded by: Solar eclipse of May 31, 2068
- Followed by: Solar eclipse of June 22, 2104

=== Inex ===
- Preceded by: Solar eclipse of July 1, 2057
- Followed by: Solar eclipse of May 24, 2115

=== Triad ===
- Preceded by: Solar eclipse of August 11, 1999
- Followed by: Solar eclipse of April 12, 2173

=== Solar eclipses of 2083–2087 ===
This eclipse is a member of a semester series. An eclipse in a semester series of solar eclipses repeats approximately every 177 days and 4 hours (a semester) at alternating nodes of the Moon's orbit.

The partial solar eclipses on February 16, 2083 and August 13, 2083 occur in the previous lunar year eclipse set, and the partial solar eclipses on May 2, 2087 and October 26, 2087 occur in the next lunar year eclipse set.

Solar eclipse series sets from 2083 to 2087
Descending node			Ascending node		
Saros	Map	Gamma	Saros	Map	Gamma
118	July 15, 2083 Partial	1.5465	123	January 7, 2084 Partial	−1.0715
128	July 3, 2084 Annular	0.8208	133	December 27, 2084 Total	−0.4094
138	June 22, 2085 Annular	0.0452	143	December 16, 2085 Annular	0.2786
148	June 11, 2086 Total	−0.7215	153	December 6, 2086 Partial	1.0194
158	June 1, 2087 Partial	−1.4186			

=== Saros 148 ===
This eclipse is a part of Saros series 148, repeating every 18 years, 11 days, and containing 75 events. The series started with a partial solar eclipse on September 21, 1653. It contains annular eclipses on April 29, 2014 and May 9, 2032; a hybrid eclipse on May 20, 2050; and total eclipses from May 31, 2068 through August 3, 2771. The series ends at member 75 as a partial eclipse on December 12, 2987. Its eclipses are tabulated in three columns; every third eclipse in the same column is one exeligmos apart, so they all cast shadows over approximately the same parts of the Earth.

The longest duration of annularity will be produced by member 22 at 22 seconds (by default) on May 9, 2032, and the longest duration of totality will be produced by member 54 at 5 minutes, 23 seconds on April 26, 2609. All eclipses in this series occur at the Moon’s descending node of orbit.

Series members 10–31 occur between 1801 and 2200:
10	11	12
December 30, 1815	January 9, 1834	January 21, 1852
13	14	15
January 31, 1870	February 11, 1888	February 23, 1906
16	17	18
March 5, 1924	March 16, 1942	March 27, 1960
19	20	21
April 7, 1978	April 17, 1996	April 29, 2014
22	23	24
May 9, 2032	May 20, 2050	May 31, 2068
25	26	27
June 11, 2086	June 22, 2104	July 4, 2122
28	29	30
July 14, 2140	July 25, 2158	August 4, 2176
31
August 16, 2194

=== Metonic series ===
The metonic series repeats eclipses every 19 years (6939.69 days), lasting about 5 cycles. Eclipses occur in nearly the same calendar date. In addition, the octon subseries repeats 1/5 of that or every 3.8 years (1387.94 days). All eclipses in this table occur at the Moon's descending node.

22 eclipse events between June 12, 2029 and November 4, 2116
June 11–12	March 30–31	January 16	November 4–5	August 23–24
118	120	122	124	126
June 12, 2029	March 30, 2033	January 16, 2037	November 4, 2040	August 23, 2044
128	130	132	134	136
June 11, 2048	March 30, 2052	January 16, 2056	November 5, 2059	August 24, 2063
138	140	142	144	146
June 11, 2067	March 31, 2071	January 16, 2075	November 4, 2078	August 24, 2082
148	150	152	154	156
June 11, 2086	March 31, 2090	January 16, 2094	November 4, 2097	August 24, 2101
158	160	162	164	
June 12, 2105			November 4, 2116	

=== Tritos series ===
This eclipse is a part of a tritos cycle, repeating at alternating nodes every 135 synodic months (≈ 3986.63 days, or 11 years minus 1 month). Their appearance and longitude are irregular due to a lack of synchronization with the anomalistic month (period of perigee), but groupings of 3 tritos cycles (≈ 33 years minus 3 months) come close (≈ 434.044 anomalistic months), so eclipses are similar in these groupings.

Series members between 1801 and 2200
August 28, 1802 (Saros 122)	July 27, 1813 (Saros 123)	June 26, 1824 (Saros 124)	May 27, 1835 (Saros 125)	April 25, 1846 (Saros 126)
March 25, 1857 (Saros 127)	February 23, 1868 (Saros 128)	January 22, 1879 (Saros 129)	December 22, 1889 (Saros 130)	November 22, 1900 (Saros 131)
October 22, 1911 (Saros 132)	September 21, 1922 (Saros 133)	August 21, 1933 (Saros 134)	July 20, 1944 (Saros 135)	June 20, 1955 (Saros 136)
May 20, 1966 (Saros 137)	April 18, 1977 (Saros 138)	March 18, 1988 (Saros 139)	February 16, 1999 (Saros 140)	January 15, 2010 (Saros 141)
December 14, 2020 (Saros 142)	November 14, 2031 (Saros 143)	October 14, 2042 (Saros 144)	September 12, 2053 (Saros 145)	August 12, 2064 (Saros 146)
July 13, 2075 (Saros 147)	June 11, 2086 (Saros 148)	May 11, 2097 (Saros 149)	April 11, 2108 (Saros 150)	March 11, 2119 (Saros 151)
February 8, 2130 (Saros 152)	January 8, 2141 (Saros 153)	December 8, 2151 (Saros 154)	November 7, 2162 (Saros 155)	October 7, 2173 (Saros 156)
September 4, 2184 (Saros 157)	August 5, 2195 (Saros 158)			

=== Inex series ===
This eclipse is a part of the long period inex cycle, repeating at alternating nodes, every 358 synodic months (≈ 10,571.95 days, or 29 years minus 20 days). Their appearance and longitude are irregular due to a lack of synchronization with the anomalistic month (period of perigee). However, groupings of 3 inex cycles (≈ 87 years minus 2 months) comes close (≈ 1,151.02 anomalistic months), so eclipses are similar in these groupings.

Series members between 1801 and 2200
December 9, 1825 (Saros 139)	November 20, 1854 (Saros 140)	October 30, 1883 (Saros 141)
October 10, 1912 (Saros 142)	September 21, 1941 (Saros 143)	August 31, 1970 (Saros 144)
August 11, 1999 (Saros 145)	July 22, 2028 (Saros 146)	July 1, 2057 (Saros 147)
June 11, 2086 (Saros 148)	May 24, 2115 (Saros 149)	May 3, 2144 (Saros 150)
April 12, 2173 (Saros 151)		
