= Solar eclipse of February 14, 1953 =

20th-century partial solar eclipse

- Partial eclipse
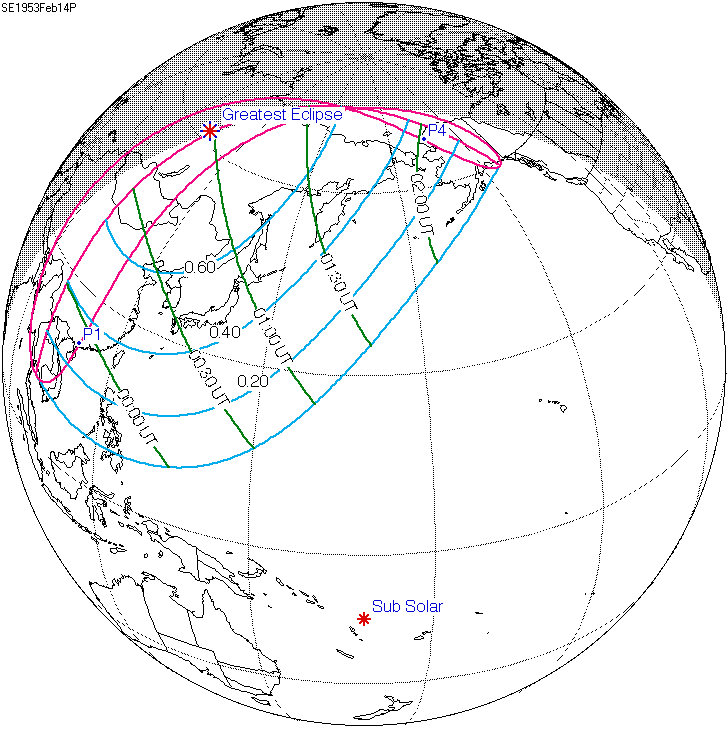
- Map
- Gamma: 1.1331
- Magnitude: 0.7596

Maximum eclipse
- Coordinates: 61.9°N 104.9°E

Times (UTC)
- Greatest eclipse: 0:59:30

References
- Saros: 149 (17 of 71)
- Catalog # (SE5000): 9404

A partial solar eclipse occurred at the Moon's ascending node of orbit between Friday, February 13 and Saturday, February 14, 1953, with a magnitude of 0.7596. A solar eclipse occurs when the Moon passes between Earth and the Sun, thereby totally or partly obscuring the image of the Sun for a viewer on Earth. A partial solar eclipse occurs in the polar regions of the Earth when the center of the Moon's shadow misses the Earth.

A partial eclipse was visible for parts of East Asia, Northeast Asia, and Alaska.

In Asia, the date of the eclipse, February 14, was the exact day of the Lunar New Year, celebrated in multiple countries.

== Eclipse details ==
Shown below are two tables displaying details about this particular solar eclipse. The first table outlines times at which the Moon's penumbra or umbra attains the specific parameter, and the second table describes various other parameters pertaining to this eclipse.

February 14, 1953 Solar Eclipse Times
Event	Time (UTC)
First Penumbral External Contact	1953 February 13 at 23:12:27.3 UTC
Greatest Eclipse	1953 February 14 at 00:59:29.8 UTC
Ecliptic Conjunction	1953 February 14 at 01:10:45.7 UTC
Equatorial Conjunction	1953 February 14 at 01:54:08.7 UTC
Last Penumbral External Contact	1953 February 14 at 02:46:08.9 UTC

February 14, 1953 Solar Eclipse Parameters
Parameter	Value
Eclipse Magnitude	0.75964
Eclipse Obscuration	0.70380
Gamma	1.13308
Sun Right Ascension	21h49m19.4s
Sun Declination	-13°10'35.4"
Sun Semi-Diameter	16'11.6"
Sun Equatorial Horizontal Parallax	08.9"
Moon Right Ascension	21h47m19.1s
Moon Declination	-12°07'43.4"
Moon Semi-Diameter	16'43.4"
Moon Equatorial Horizontal Parallax	1°01'22.7"
ΔT	30.4 s

== Eclipse season ==
This eclipse is part of an eclipse season, a period, roughly every six months, when eclipses occur. Only two (or occasionally three) eclipse seasons occur each year, and each season lasts about 35 days and repeats just short of six months (173 days) later; thus two full eclipse seasons always occur each year. Either two or three eclipses happen each eclipse season. In the sequence below, each eclipse is separated by a fortnight.

Eclipse season of January–February 1953
January 29 Descending node (full moon)	February 14 Ascending node (new moon)
Total lunar eclipse Lunar Saros 123	Partial solar eclipse Solar Saros 149

== Related eclipses ==
=== Eclipses in 1953 ===
- A total lunar eclipse on January 29.
- A partial solar eclipse on February 14.
- A partial solar eclipse on July 11.
- A total lunar eclipse on July 26.
- A partial solar eclipse on August 9.

=== Metonic ===
- Preceded by: Solar eclipse of April 28, 1949
- Followed by: Solar eclipse of December 2, 1956

=== Tzolkinex ===
- Preceded by: Solar eclipse of January 3, 1946
- Followed by: Solar eclipse of March 27, 1960

=== Half-Saros ===
- Preceded by: Lunar eclipse of February 9, 1944
- Followed by: Lunar eclipse of February 19, 1962

=== Tritos ===
- Preceded by: Solar eclipse of March 16, 1942
- Followed by: Solar eclipse of January 14, 1964

=== Solar Saros 149 ===
- Preceded by: Solar eclipse of February 3, 1935
- Followed by: Solar eclipse of February 25, 1971

=== Inex ===
- Preceded by: Solar eclipse of March 5, 1924
- Followed by: Solar eclipse of January 25, 1982

=== Triad ===
- Preceded by: Solar eclipse of April 15, 1866
- Followed by: Solar eclipse of December 15, 2039

=== Solar eclipses of 1950–1953 ===
This eclipse is a member of a semester series. An eclipse in a semester series of solar eclipses repeats approximately every 177 days and 4 hours (a semester) at alternating nodes of the Moon's orbit.

The partial solar eclipse on July 11, 1953 occurs in the next lunar year eclipse set.

Solar eclipse series sets from 1950 to 1953
Ascending node			Descending node		
Saros	Map	Gamma	Saros	Map	Gamma
119	March 18, 1950 Annular (non-central)	0.9988	124	September 12, 1950 Total	0.8903
129	March 7, 1951 Annular	−0.242	134	September 1, 1951 Annular	0.1557
139	February 25, 1952 Total	0.4697	144	August 20, 1952 Annular	−0.6102
149	February 14, 1953 Partial	1.1331	154	August 9, 1953 Partial	−1.344

=== Saros 149 ===
This eclipse is a part of Saros series 149, repeating every 18 years, 11 days, 8 hours and containing 71 events. The series started with a partial solar eclipse on August 21, 1664. It contains total eclipses from April 9, 2043 through October 2, 2331; hybrid eclipses from October 13, 2349 through November 3, 2385; and annular eclipses from November 15, 2403 through July 13, 2800. The series ends at member 71 as a partial eclipse on September 28, 2926. Its eclipses are tabulated in three columns; every third eclipse in the same column is one exeligmos apart, so they all cast shadows over approximately the same parts of the Earth.

The longest duration of totality will be produced by member 31 at 4 minutes, 10 seconds on July 17, 2205, and the longest duration of annularity will be produced by member 62 at 5 minutes, 6 seconds on June 21, 2764. All eclipses in this series occur at the Moon’s ascending node of orbit.

Series members 9–30 occur between 1801 and 2200:
9	10	11
November 18, 1808	November 29, 1826	December 9, 1844
12	13	14
December 21, 1862	December 31, 1880	January 11, 1899
15	16	17
January 23, 1917	February 3, 1935	February 14, 1953
18	19	20
February 25, 1971	March 7, 1989	March 19, 2007
21	22	23
March 29, 2025	April 9, 2043	April 20, 2061
24	25	26
May 1, 2079	May 11, 2097	May 24, 2115
27	28	29
June 3, 2133	June 14, 2151	June 25, 2169
30
July 6, 2187

=== Metonic series ===
The metonic series repeats eclipses every 19 years (6939.69 days), lasting about 5 cycles. Eclipses occur in nearly the same calendar date. In addition, the octon subseries repeats 1/5 of that or every 3.8 years (1387.94 days). All eclipses in this table occur at the Moon's ascending node.

22 eclipse events between December 2, 1880 and July 9, 1964
December 2–3	September 20–21	July 9–10	April 26–28	February 13–14
111	113	115	117	119
December 2, 1880		July 9, 1888	April 26, 1892	February 13, 1896
121	123	125	127	129
December 3, 1899	September 21, 1903	July 10, 1907	April 28, 1911	February 14, 1915
131	133	135	137	139
December 3, 1918	September 21, 1922	July 9, 1926	April 28, 1930	February 14, 1934
141	143	145	147	149
December 2, 1937	September 21, 1941	July 9, 1945	April 28, 1949	February 14, 1953
151	153	155		
December 2, 1956	September 20, 1960	July 9, 1964		

=== Tritos series ===
This eclipse is a part of a tritos cycle, repeating at alternating nodes every 135 synodic months (≈ 3986.63 days, or 11 years minus 1 month). Their appearance and longitude are irregular due to a lack of synchronization with the anomalistic month (period of perigee), but groupings of 3 tritos cycles (≈ 33 years minus 3 months) come close (≈ 434.044 anomalistic months), so eclipses are similar in these groupings.

The partial solar eclipse on November 4, 2116 (part of Saros 164) is also a part of this series but is not included in the table below.

Series members between 1801 and 2029
March 24, 1811 (Saros 136)	February 21, 1822 (Saros 137)	January 20, 1833 (Saros 138)	December 21, 1843 (Saros 139)	November 20, 1854 (Saros 140)
October 19, 1865 (Saros 141)	September 17, 1876 (Saros 142)	August 19, 1887 (Saros 143)	July 18, 1898 (Saros 144)	June 17, 1909 (Saros 145)
May 18, 1920 (Saros 146)	April 18, 1931 (Saros 147)	March 16, 1942 (Saros 148)	February 14, 1953 (Saros 149)	January 14, 1964 (Saros 150)
December 13, 1974 (Saros 151)	November 12, 1985 (Saros 152)	October 12, 1996 (Saros 153)	September 11, 2007 (Saros 154)	August 11, 2018 (Saros 155)
July 11, 2029 (Saros 156)

=== Inex series ===
This eclipse is a part of the long period inex cycle, repeating at alternating nodes, every 358 synodic months (≈ 10,571.95 days, or 29 years minus 20 days). Their appearance and longitude are irregular due to a lack of synchronization with the anomalistic month (period of perigee). However, groupings of 3 inex cycles (≈ 87 years minus 2 months) comes close (≈ 1,151.02 anomalistic months), so eclipses are similar in these groupings.

Series members between 1801 and 2200
May 25, 1808 (Saros 144)	May 4, 1837 (Saros 145)	April 15, 1866 (Saros 146)
March 26, 1895 (Saros 147)	March 5, 1924 (Saros 148)	February 14, 1953 (Saros 149)
January 24, 1982 (Saros 150)	January 4, 2011 (Saros 151)	December 15, 2039 (Saros 152)
November 24, 2068 (Saros 153)	November 4, 2097 (Saros 154)	October 16, 2126 (Saros 155)
September 26, 2155 (Saros 156)	September 4, 2184 (Saros 157)	
