= Solar Saros 149 =

Series of solar eclipses

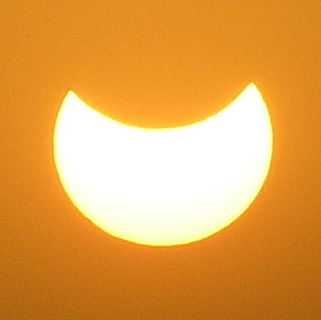
Partial solar eclipse of March 19, 2007 from Jaipur, India, member 20, of Saros series 149

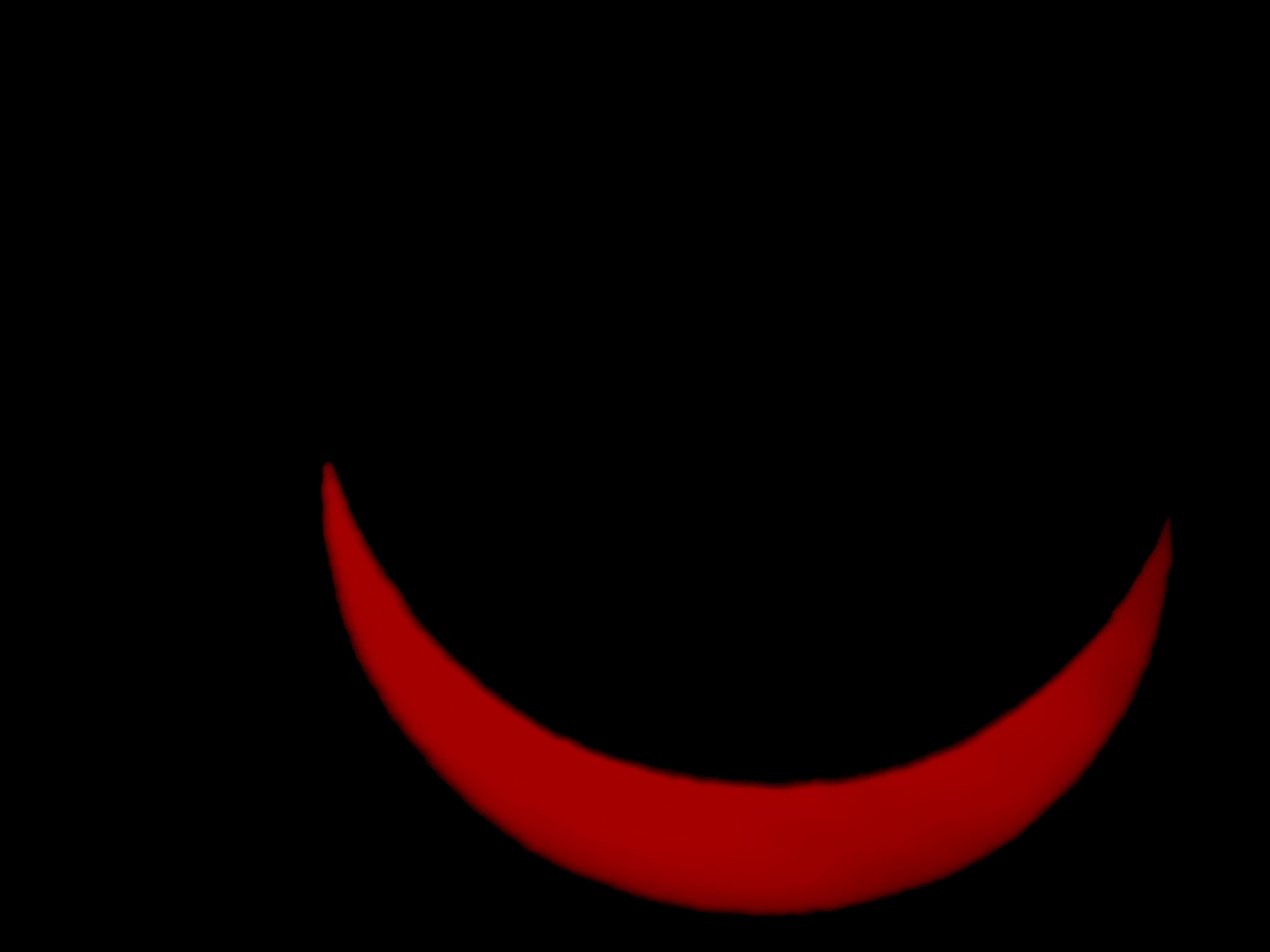
Partial solar eclipse of March 29, 2025 from Halifax, Nova Scotia, Canada, member 21, of Saros series 149

Historic saros cycle animation

Saros cycle series 149 for solar eclipses occurs at the Moon's ascending node, repeating every 18 years, 11 days, 8 hours containing 71 eclipses, 43 of which are umbral (17 total, 3 hybrid, 23 annular). The first eclipse in the series was on 21 August 1664 and the last will be on 28 September 2926. The most recent eclipse was a partial eclipse on 29 March 2025 and the next will be a total eclipse on 09 April 2043.

The longest totality will be 4 minutes 10 seconds on 17 July 2205 while the longest annular will be 5 minutes 6 seconds on 21 June 2764.

This solar saros is linked to Lunar Saros 142.

== Umbral eclipses ==
Umbral eclipses (annular, total and hybrid) can be further classified as either: 1) Central (two limits), 2) Central (one limit) or 3) Non-Central (one limit). The statistical distribution of these classes in Saros series 149 appears in the following table.

Classification	Number	Percent
All Umbral eclipses	43	100.00%
Central (two limits)	42	97.67%
Central (one limit)	0	0.00%
Non-central (one limit)	1	2.33%

== All eclipses ==
Saros	Member	Date	Time (Greatest) UTC	Type	Location Lat, Long	Gamma	Mag.	Width (km)	Duration (min:sec)	Ref
149	1	August 21, 1664	8:58:23	Partial	71N 173.8E	1.487	0.0844			
149	2	September 1, 1682	16:42:24	Partial	71.5N 44.3E	1.4279	0.1978			
149	3	September 13, 1700	0:34:18	Partial	71.9N 87.6W	1.3749	0.2996			
149	4	September 24, 1718	8:34:20	Partial	72N 138.3E	1.3282	0.3889			
149	5	October 4, 1736	16:41:34	Partial	71.9N 2.4E	1.2874	0.467			
149	6	October 16, 1754	0:57:46	Partial	71.5N 135.5W	1.2535	0.5314			
149	7	October 26, 1772	9:21:18	Partial	70.9N 85.1E	1.2255	0.5846			
149	8	November 6, 1790	17:53:11	Partial	70.1N 55.8W	1.2044	0.6245			
149	9	November 18, 1808	2:30:03	Partial	69.2N 162.6E	1.1874	0.6564			
149	10	November 29, 1826	11:14:08	Partial	68.2N 19.9E	1.1764	0.677			
149	11	December 9, 1844	20:01:39	Partial	67.1N 123W	1.1682	0.6924			
149	12	December 21, 1862	4:53:03	Partial	66N 93.6E	1.1633	0.7016			
149	13	December 31, 1880	13:45:01	Partial	65N 49.5W	1.1591	0.7096			
149	14	January 11, 1899	22:38:02	Partial	64N 167.5E	1.1558	0.7158			
149	15	January 23, 1917	7:28:31	Partial	63.2N 25.6E	1.1508	0.7254			
149	16	February 3, 1935	16:16:20	Partial	62.5N 115.4W	1.1438	0.739			
149	17	February 14, 1953	0:59:30	Partial	61.9N 104.9E	1.1331	0.7596			
149	18	February 25, 1971	9:38:07	Partial	61.4N 33.5W	1.1188	0.7872			
149	19	March 7, 1989	18:08:41	Partial	61.2N 169.8W	1.0981	0.8268			
149	20	March 19, 2007	2:32:57	Partial	61N 55.5E	1.0728	0.8756			
149	21	March 29, 2025	10:48:36	Partial	61.1N 77.1W	1.0405	0.9376			
149	22	April 9, 2043	18:57:49	Total (Note: Non-central)	61.3N 152E	1.0031	1.0095	-	-	
149	23	April 20, 2061	2:56:49	Total	64.5N 59.2E	0.9578	1.0475	559	2m 37s	
149	24	May 1, 2079	10:50:13	Total	66.2N 46.3W	0.9081	1.0512	406	2m 55s	
149	25	May 11, 2097	18:34:31	Total	67.4N 149.5W	0.8516	1.0538	339	3m 10s	
149	26	May 24, 2115	2:13:56	Total	67.8N 109.4E	0.7912	1.0557	301	3m 24s	
149	27	June 3, 2133	9:45:16	Total	66.6N 10.7E	0.7247	1.0567	272	3m 36s	
149	28	June 14, 2151	17:13:45	Total	63.7N 89.4W	0.6561	1.0569	249	3m 48s	
149	29	June 25, 2169	0:37:09	Total	59.2N 168.6E	0.5841	1.0562	229	3m 58s	
149	30	July 6, 2187	7:58:31	Total	53.6N 63.8E	0.5109	1.0548	211	4m 6s	
149	31	July 17, 2205	15:18:00	Total	47.2N 43W	0.4367	1.0525	193	4m 10s	
149	32	July 28, 2223	22:38:03	Total	40.2N 151.7W	0.3636	1.0495	176	4m 9s	
149	33	August 8, 2241	5:59:21	Total	32.9N 98E	0.292	1.0457	159	4m 2s	
149	34	August 19, 2259	13:22:17	Total	25.3N 13.6W	0.2226	1.0412	141	3m 49s	
149	35	August 29, 2277	20:49:11	Total	17.8N 126.7W	0.1573	1.0362	123	3m 28s	
149	36	September 10, 2295	4:20:19	Total	10.3N 118.9E	0.0963	1.0307	104	3m 1s	
149	37	September 21, 2313	11:57:00	Total	3N 3E	0.0405	1.0249	85	2m 30s	
149	38	October 2, 2331	19:39:16	Total	4S 114.2W	-0.0097	1.0188	64	1m 55s	
149	39	October 13, 2349	3:28:54	Hybrid	10.6S 127.2E	-0.0532	1.0126	43	1m 18s	
149	40	October 24, 2367	11:25:04	Hybrid	16.7S 7.3E	-0.0902	1.0065	22	0m 40s	
149	41	November 3, 2385	19:27:30	Hybrid	22.1S 113.5W	-0.1212	1.0004	2	0m 3s	
149	42	November 15, 2403	3:36:24	Annular	26.8S 124.9E	-0.1461	0.9947	19	0m 33s	
149	43	November 25, 2421	11:51:41	Annular	30.4S 2.4E	-0.1652	0.9893	38	1m 6s	
149	44	December 6, 2439	20:11:47	Annular	33S 120.5W	-0.1794	0.9844	56	1m 36s	
149	45	December 17, 2457	4:35:27	Annular	34.4S 116.2E	-0.19	0.9799	73	2m 4s	
149	46	December 28, 2475	13:01:54	Annular	34.7S 7.6W	-0.1977	0.976	87	2m 27s	
149	47	January 7, 2494	21:30:21	Annular	33.7S 132W	-0.2034	0.9727	100	2m 46s	
149	48	January 20, 2512	5:57:20	Annular	31.9S 103.6E	-0.2096	0.97	110	3m 2s	
149	49	January 30, 2530	14:23:10	Annular	29.3S 21W	-0.2163	0.9678	119	3m 14s	
149	50	February 10, 2548	22:44:25	Annular	26.3S 144.9W	-0.2262	0.9662	125	3m 23s	
149	51	February 21, 2566	7:01:44	Annular	22.9S 91.8E	-0.2388	0.965	130	3m 30s	
149	52	March 3, 2584	15:10:31	Annular	19.6S 29.8W	-0.258	0.9643	133	3m 36s	
149	53	March 15, 2602	23:13:25	Annular	16.4S 150W	-0.2814	0.9638	136	3m 41s	
149	54	March 26, 2620	7:06:11	Annular	13.7S 92.2E	-0.3125	0.9636	138	3m 46s	
149	55	April 6, 2638	14:50:17	Annular	11.6S 23.4W	-0.35	0.9635	140	3m 52s	
149	56	April 16, 2656	22:23:12	Annular	10.5S 136.2W	-0.3957	0.9633	143	4m 0s	
149	57	April 28, 2674	5:47:47	Annular	10.2S 113E	-0.4477	0.9631	147	4m 9s	
149	58	May 8, 2692	13:02:03	Annular	11.2S 4.8E	-0.5074	0.9627	155	4m 21s	
149	59	May 20, 2710	20:07:03	Annular	13.6S 101.3W	-0.5738	0.962	166	4m 34s	
149	60	May 31, 2728	3:03:54	Annular	17.4S 154.2E	-0.6458	0.9608	185	4m 48s	
149	61	June 11, 2746	9:53:44	Annular	22.8S 50.8E	-0.7226	0.9591	214	4m 59s	
149	62	June 21, 2764	16:37:03	Annular	30.2S 51.7W	-0.8039	0.9568	265	5m 6s	
149	63	July 2, 2782	23:15:18	Annular	40.2S 154.2W	-0.8886	0.9534	373	5m 6s	
149	64	July 13, 2800	5:50:34	Annular	56.1S 101E	-0.9747	0.9483	893	4m 52s	
149	65	July 24, 2818	12:24:20	Partial	69.2S 11.7W	-1.0608	0.8615			
149	66	August 3, 2836	18:56:34	Partial	70.1S 121.4W	-1.1473	0.7116			
149	67	August 15, 2854	1:31:02	Partial	70.9S 127.9E	-1.231	0.5673			
149	68	August 25, 2872	8:07:26	Partial	71.5S 16.1E	-1.3122	0.4279			
149	69	September 5, 2890	14:49:00	Partial	72S 97.5W	-1.3883	0.2981			
149	70	September 16, 2908	21:33:42	Partial	72.2S 147.8E	-1.4611	0.175			
149	71	September 28, 2926	4:26:34	Partial	72.2S 31E	-1.5263	0.0655			

== Source ==
http://eclipse.gsfc.nasa.gov/SEsaros/SEsaros149.html
