= Solar eclipse of May 1, 2079 =

Total eclipse

- Total eclipse
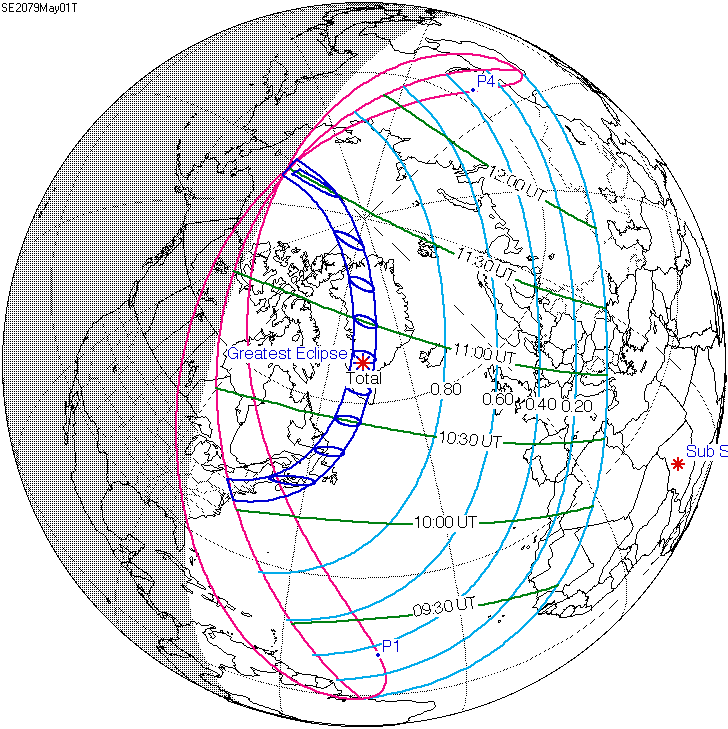
- Map
- Gamma: 0.9081
- Magnitude: 1.0512

Maximum eclipse
- Duration: 175 s (2 min 55 s)
- Coordinates: 66.2°N 46.3°W
- Max. width of band: 406 km (252 mi)

Times (UTC)
- Greatest eclipse: 10:50:13

References
- Saros: 149 (24 of 71)
- Catalog # (SE5000): 9685

A total solar eclipse will occur at the Moon's ascending node of orbit on Monday, May 1, 2079, with a magnitude of 1.0512. A solar eclipse occurs when the Moon passes between Earth and the Sun, thereby totally or partly obscuring the image of the Sun for a viewer on Earth. A total solar eclipse occurs when the Moon's apparent diameter is larger than the Sun's, blocking all direct sunlight, turning day into darkness. Totality occurs in a narrow path across Earth's surface, with the partial solar eclipse visible over a surrounding region thousands of kilometres wide. Occurring about 1.2 days before perigee (on May 2, 2079, at 14:45 UTC), the Moon's apparent diameter will be larger.

The path of totality will be visible from parts of Maryland, Delaware, Pennsylvania, New Jersey, New York, Connecticut, Massachusetts, Rhode Island, Vermont, New Hampshire, and Maine in the United States, eastern Canada (including Newfoundland and Labrador, New Brunswick, Nova Scotia and Prince Edward Island), and Greenland. A partial solar eclipse will also be visible for parts of eastern North America, the eastern Caribbean, Northwest Africa, Europe, and much of Russia.

This will be the first total eclipse visible from New York City since January 24, 1925, and unlike the previous eclipse, the city will experience totality across the entire city limits.

== Visible cities ==
The path of totality will start in eastern Pennsylvania. A total eclipse will be visible along the path of Philadelphia, New York City, Hartford, Providence, Rhode Island, Boston, and Portland, Maine in the United States. Partial eclipses will be visible in Charlotte, Richmond, Cleveland, Detroit, Chicago, Washington, D.C., and Buffalo. In Canada, the total eclipse can be visible in Halifax, and Saint John, while the partial eclipse can be seen in Montreal, Toronto, Ottawa, and most of northern Canada. The path then passes directly through Nuuk, making it visible to most of Greenland. The path will end near the Bering Strait. A partial eclipse can be visible in a very small part of South America, Northern Africa, Europe and Northern Asia (Mostly Russia). The path of totality barely misses the North Pole by about 100 miles (160 km).

== Eclipse details ==
Shown below are two tables displaying details about this particular solar eclipse. The first table outlines times at which the Moon's penumbra or umbra attains the specific parameter, and the second table describes various other parameters pertaining to this eclipse.

May 1, 2079 Solar Eclipse Times
Event	Time (UTC)
First Penumbral External Contact	2079 May 01 at 08:41:50.7 UTC
First Umbral External Contact	2079 May 01 at 10:04:20.0 UTC
First Central Line	2079 May 01 at 10:07:06.5 UTC
First Umbral Internal Contact	2079 May 01 at 10:10:02.6 UTC
Greatest Eclipse	2079 May 01 at 10:50:12.8 UTC
Greatest Duration	2079 May 01 at 10:50:58.0 UTC
Ecliptic Conjunction	2079 May 01 at 10:59:21.0 UTC
Equatorial Conjunction	2079 May 01 at 11:31:19.4 UTC
Last Umbral Internal Contact	2079 May 01 at 11:29:55.4 UTC
Last Central Line	2079 May 01 at 11:32:53.1 UTC
Last Umbral External Contact	2079 May 01 at 11:35:41.3 UTC
Last Penumbral External Contact	2079 May 01 at 12:58:15.4 UTC

May 1, 2079 Solar Eclipse Parameters
Parameter	Value
Eclipse Magnitude	1.05116
Eclipse Obscuration	1.10494
Gamma	0.90808
Sun Right Ascension	02h35m18.8s
Sun Declination	+15°12'06.8"
Sun Semi-Diameter	15'52.6"
Sun Equatorial Horizontal Parallax	08.7"
Moon Right Ascension	02h33m47.0s
Moon Declination	+16°02'36.5"
Moon Semi-Diameter	16'34.7"
Moon Equatorial Horizontal Parallax	1°00'50.6"
ΔT	104.9 s

== Eclipse season ==
This eclipse is part of an eclipse season, a period, roughly every six months, when eclipses occur. Only two (or occasionally three) eclipse seasons occur each year, and each season lasts about 35 days and repeats just short of six months (173 days) later; thus two full eclipse seasons always occur each year. Either two or three eclipses happen each eclipse season. In the sequence below, each eclipse is separated by a fortnight.

Eclipse season of April–May 2079
April 16 Descending node (full moon)	May 1 Ascending node (new moon)
Partial lunar eclipse Lunar Saros 123	Total solar eclipse Solar Saros 149

== Related eclipses ==
=== Eclipses in 2079 ===
- A partial lunar eclipse on April 16.
- A total solar eclipse on May 1.
- A total lunar eclipse on October 10.
- An annular solar eclipse on October 24.

=== Metonic ===
- Preceded by: Solar eclipse of July 13, 2075
- Followed by: Solar eclipse of February 16, 2083

=== Tzolkinex ===
- Preceded by: Solar eclipse of March 19, 2072
- Followed by: Solar eclipse of June 11, 2086

=== Half-Saros ===
- Preceded by: Lunar eclipse of April 25, 2070
- Followed by: Lunar eclipse of May 5, 2088

=== Tritos ===
- Preceded by: Solar eclipse of May 31, 2068
- Followed by: Solar eclipse of March 31, 2090

=== Solar Saros 149 ===
- Preceded by: Solar eclipse of April 20, 2061
- Followed by: Solar eclipse of May 11, 2097

=== Inex ===
- Preceded by: Solar eclipse of May 20, 2050
- Followed by: Solar eclipse of April 11, 2108

=== Triad ===
- Preceded by: Solar eclipse of June 30, 1992
- Followed by: Solar eclipse of March 2, 2166

=== Solar eclipses of 2076–2079 ===
This eclipse is a member of a semester series. An eclipse in a semester series of solar eclipses repeats approximately every 177 days and 4 hours (a semester) at alternating nodes of the Moon's orbit.

The partial solar eclipses on January 6, 2076 and July 1, 2076 occur in the previous lunar year eclipse set.

Solar eclipse series sets from 2076 to 2079
Ascending node			Descending node		
Saros	Map	Gamma	Saros	Map	Gamma
119	June 1, 2076 Partial	−1.3897	124	November 26, 2076 Partial	1.1401
129	May 22, 2077 Total	−0.5725	134	November 15, 2077 Annular	0.4705
139	May 11, 2078 Total	0.1838	144	November 4, 2078 Annular	−0.2285
149	May 1, 2079 Total	0.9081	154	October 24, 2079 Annular	−0.9243

=== Saros 149 ===
This eclipse is a part of Saros series 149, repeating every 18 years, 11 days, 8 hours and containing 71 events. The series started with a partial solar eclipse on August 21, 1664. It contains total eclipses from April 9, 2043 through October 2, 2331; hybrid eclipses from October 13, 2349 through November 3, 2385; and annular eclipses from November 15, 2403 through July 13, 2800. The series ends at member 71 as a partial eclipse on September 28, 2926. Its eclipses are tabulated in three columns; every third eclipse in the same column is one exeligmos apart, so they all cast shadows over approximately the same parts of the Earth.

The longest duration of totality will be produced by member 31 at 4 minutes, 10 seconds on July 17, 2205, and the longest duration of annularity will be produced by member 62 at 5 minutes, 6 seconds on June 21, 2764. All eclipses in this series occur at the Moon’s ascending node of orbit.

Series members 9–30 occur between 1801 and 2200:
9	10	11
November 18, 1808	November 29, 1826	December 9, 1844
12	13	14
December 21, 1862	December 31, 1880	January 11, 1899
15	16	17
January 23, 1917	February 3, 1935	February 14, 1953
18	19	20
February 25, 1971	March 7, 1989	March 19, 2007
21	22	23
March 29, 2025	April 9, 2043	April 20, 2061
24	25	26
May 1, 2079	May 11, 2097	May 24, 2115
27	28	29
June 3, 2133	June 14, 2151	June 25, 2169
30
July 6, 2187

=== Metonic series ===
The metonic series repeats eclipses every 19 years (6939.69 days), lasting about 5 cycles. Eclipses occur in nearly the same calendar date. In addition, the octon subseries repeats 1/5 of that or every 3.8 years (1387.94 days). All eclipses in this table occur at the Moon's ascending node.

21 eclipse events between July 13, 2018 and July 12, 2094
July 12–13	April 30–May 1	February 16–17	December 5–6	September 22–23
117	119	121	123	125
July 13, 2018	April 30, 2022	February 17, 2026	December 5, 2029	September 23, 2033
127	129	131	133	135
July 13, 2037	April 30, 2041	February 16, 2045	December 5, 2048	September 22, 2052
137	139	141	143	145
July 12, 2056	April 30, 2060	February 17, 2064	December 6, 2067	September 23, 2071
147	149	151	153	155
July 13, 2075	May 1, 2079	February 16, 2083	December 6, 2086	September 23, 2090
157
July 12, 2094

=== Tritos series ===
This eclipse is a part of a tritos cycle, repeating at alternating nodes every 135 synodic months (≈ 3986.63 days, or 11 years minus 1 month). Their appearance and longitude are irregular due to a lack of synchronization with the anomalistic month (period of perigee), but groupings of 3 tritos cycles (≈ 33 years minus 3 months) come close (≈ 434.044 anomalistic months), so eclipses are similar in these groupings.

Series members between 1801 and 2200
June 16, 1806 (Saros 124)	May 16, 1817 (Saros 125)	April 14, 1828 (Saros 126)	March 15, 1839 (Saros 127)	February 12, 1850 (Saros 128)
January 11, 1861 (Saros 129)	December 12, 1871 (Saros 130)	November 10, 1882 (Saros 131)	October 9, 1893 (Saros 132)	September 9, 1904 (Saros 133)
August 10, 1915 (Saros 134)	July 9, 1926 (Saros 135)	June 8, 1937 (Saros 136)	May 9, 1948 (Saros 137)	April 8, 1959 (Saros 138)
March 7, 1970 (Saros 139)	February 4, 1981 (Saros 140)	January 4, 1992 (Saros 141)	December 4, 2002 (Saros 142)	November 3, 2013 (Saros 143)
October 2, 2024 (Saros 144)	September 2, 2035 (Saros 145)	August 2, 2046 (Saros 146)	July 1, 2057 (Saros 147)	May 31, 2068 (Saros 148)
May 1, 2079 (Saros 149)	March 31, 2090 (Saros 150)	February 28, 2101 (Saros 151)	January 29, 2112 (Saros 152)	December 28, 2122 (Saros 153)
November 26, 2133 (Saros 154)	October 26, 2144 (Saros 155)	September 26, 2155 (Saros 156)	August 25, 2166 (Saros 157)	July 25, 2177 (Saros 158)
June 24, 2188 (Saros 159)	May 24, 2199 (Saros 160)			

=== Inex series ===
This eclipse is a part of the long period inex cycle, repeating at alternating nodes, every 358 synodic months (≈ 10,571.95 days, or 29 years minus 20 days). Their appearance and longitude are irregular due to a lack of synchronization with the anomalistic month (period of perigee). However, groupings of 3 inex cycles (≈ 87 years minus 2 months) comes close (≈ 1,151.02 anomalistic months), so eclipses are similar in these groupings.

Series members between 1801 and 2200
October 29, 1818 (Saros 140)	October 9, 1847 (Saros 141)	September 17, 1876 (Saros 142)
August 30, 1905 (Saros 143)	August 10, 1934 (Saros 144)	July 20, 1963 (Saros 145)
June 30, 1992 (Saros 146)	June 10, 2021 (Saros 147)	May 20, 2050 (Saros 148)
May 1, 2079 (Saros 149)	April 11, 2108 (Saros 150)	March 21, 2137 (Saros 151)
March 2, 2166 (Saros 152)	February 10, 2195 (Saros 153)	
