= Solar eclipse of February 25, 1971 =

20th-century partial solar eclipse

- Partial eclipse
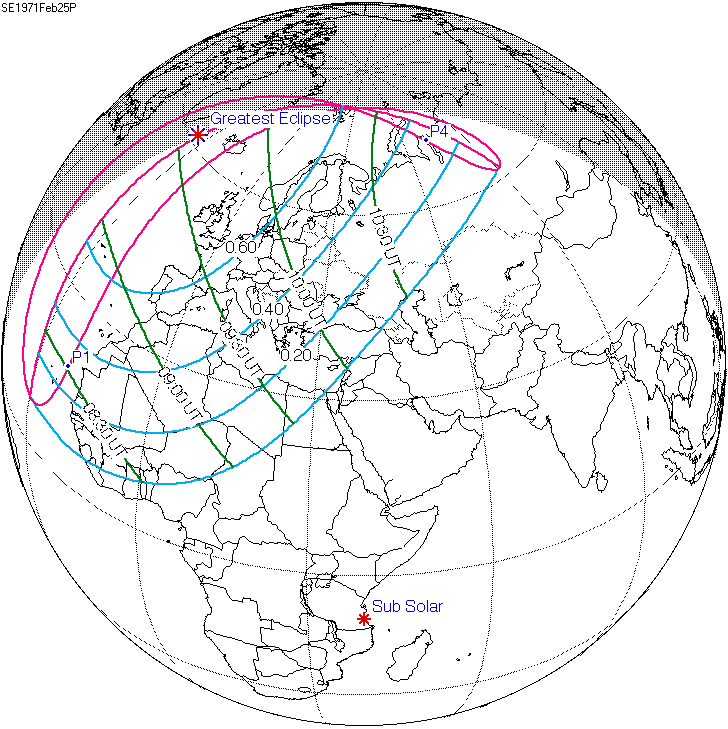
- Map
- Gamma: 1.1188
- Magnitude: 0.7872

Maximum eclipse
- Coordinates: 61.4°N 33.5°W

Times (UTC)
- Greatest eclipse: 9:38:07

References
- Saros: 149 (18 of 71)
- Catalog # (SE5000): 9444

A partial solar eclipse occurred at the Moon's ascending node of orbit on Thursday, February 25, 1971, with a magnitude of 0.7872. A solar eclipse occurs when the Moon passes between Earth and the Sun, thereby totally or partly obscuring the image of the Sun for a viewer on Earth. A partial solar eclipse occurs in the polar regions of the Earth when the center of the Moon's shadow misses the Earth.

A partial eclipse was visible for parts of North Africa and Europe.

== Eclipse details ==
Shown below are two tables displaying details about this particular solar eclipse. The first table outlines times at which the Moon's penumbra or umbra attains the specific parameter, and the second table describes various other parameters pertaining to this eclipse.

February 25, 1971 Solar Eclipse Times
Event	Time (UTC)
First Penumbral External Contact	1971 February 25 at 07:49:28.7 UTC
Greatest Eclipse	1971 February 25 at 09:38:07.1 UTC
Ecliptic Conjunction	1971 February 25 at 09:49:14.7 UTC
Equatorial Conjunction	1971 February 25 at 10:37:14.9 UTC
Last Penumbral External Contact	1971 February 25 at 11:26:20.3 UTC

February 25, 1971 Solar Eclipse Parameters
Parameter	Value
Eclipse Magnitude	0.78718
Eclipse Obscuration	0.73865
Gamma	1.11876
Sun Right Ascension	22h31m38.2s
Sun Declination	-09°15'46.7"
Sun Semi-Diameter	16'09.4"
Sun Equatorial Horizontal Parallax	08.9"
Moon Right Ascension	22h29m32.0s
Moon Declination	-08°14'50.7"
Moon Semi-Diameter	16'42.7"
Moon Equatorial Horizontal Parallax	1°01'19.9"
ΔT	41.3 s

== Eclipse season ==
This eclipse is part of an eclipse season, a period, roughly every six months, when eclipses occur. Only two (or occasionally three) eclipse seasons occur each year, and each season lasts about 35 days and repeats just short of six months (173 days) later; thus two full eclipse seasons always occur each year. Either two or three eclipses happen each eclipse season. In the sequence below, each eclipse is separated by a fortnight.

Eclipse season of February 1971
February 10 Descending node (full moon)	February 25 Ascending node (new moon)
Total lunar eclipse Lunar Saros 123	Partial solar eclipse Solar Saros 149

== Related eclipses ==
=== Eclipses in 1971 ===
- A total lunar eclipse on February 10.
- A partial solar eclipse on February 25.
- A partial solar eclipse on July 22.
- A total lunar eclipse on August 6.
- A partial solar eclipse on August 20.

=== Metonic ===
- Preceded by: Solar eclipse of May 9, 1967
- Followed by: Solar eclipse of December 13, 1974

=== Tzolkinex ===
- Preceded by: Solar eclipse of January 14, 1964
- Followed by: Solar eclipse of April 7, 1978

=== Half-Saros ===
- Preceded by: Lunar eclipse of February 19, 1962
- Followed by: Lunar eclipse of March 1, 1980

=== Tritos ===
- Preceded by: Solar eclipse of March 27, 1960
- Followed by: Solar eclipse of January 25, 1982

=== Solar Saros 149 ===
- Preceded by: Solar eclipse of February 14, 1953
- Followed by: Solar eclipse of March 7, 1989

=== Inex ===
- Preceded by: Solar eclipse of March 16, 1942
- Followed by: Solar eclipse of February 5, 2000

=== Triad ===
- Preceded by: Solar eclipse of April 25, 1884
- Followed by: Solar eclipse of December 26, 2057

=== Solar eclipses of 1968–1971 ===
This eclipse is a member of a semester series. An eclipse in a semester series of solar eclipses repeats approximately every 177 days and 4 hours (a semester) at alternating nodes of the Moon's orbit.

The partial solar eclipse on July 22, 1971 occurs in the next lunar year eclipse set.

Solar eclipse series sets from 1968 to 1971
Ascending node			Descending node		
Saros	Map	Gamma	Saros	Map	Gamma
119	March 28, 1968 Partial	−1.037	124	September 22, 1968 Total	0.9451
129	March 18, 1969 Annular	−0.2704	134	September 11, 1969 Annular	0.2201
139 Totality in Williamston, NC; USA	March 7, 1970 Total	0.4473	144	August 31, 1970 Annular	−0.5364
149	February 25, 1971 Partial	1.1188	154	August 20, 1971 Partial	−1.2659

=== Saros 149 ===
This eclipse is a part of Saros series 149, repeating every 18 years, 11 days, 8 hours and containing 71 events. The series started with a partial solar eclipse on August 21, 1664. It contains total eclipses from April 9, 2043 through October 2, 2331; hybrid eclipses from October 13, 2349 through November 3, 2385; and annular eclipses from November 15, 2403 through July 13, 2800. The series ends at member 71 as a partial eclipse on September 28, 2926. Its eclipses are tabulated in three columns; every third eclipse in the same column is one exeligmos apart, so they all cast shadows over approximately the same parts of the Earth.

The longest duration of totality will be produced by member 31 at 4 minutes, 10 seconds on July 17, 2205, and the longest duration of annularity will be produced by member 62 at 5 minutes, 6 seconds on June 21, 2764. All eclipses in this series occur at the Moon’s ascending node of orbit.

Series members 9–30 occur between 1801 and 2200:
9	10	11
November 18, 1808	November 29, 1826	December 9, 1844
12	13	14
December 21, 1862	December 31, 1880	January 11, 1899
15	16	17
January 23, 1917	February 3, 1935	February 14, 1953
18	19	20
February 25, 1971	March 7, 1989	March 19, 2007
21	22	23
March 29, 2025	April 9, 2043	April 20, 2061
24	25	26
May 1, 2079	May 11, 2097	May 24, 2115
27	28	29
June 3, 2133	June 14, 2151	June 25, 2169
30
July 6, 2187

=== Metonic series ===
The metonic series repeats eclipses every 19 years (6939.69 days), lasting about 5 cycles. Eclipses occur in nearly the same calendar date. In addition, the octon subseries repeats 1/5 of that or every 3.8 years (1387.94 days). All eclipses in this table occur at the Moon's ascending node.

22 eclipse events between December 13, 1898 and July 20, 1982
December 13–14	October 1–2	July 20–21	May 9	February 24–25
111	113	115	117	119
December 13, 1898		July 21, 1906	May 9, 1910	February 25, 1914
121	123	125	127	129
December 14, 1917	October 1, 1921	July 20, 1925	May 9, 1929	February 24, 1933
131	133	135	137	139
December 13, 1936	October 1, 1940	July 20, 1944	May 9, 1948	February 25, 1952
141	143	145	147	149
December 14, 1955	October 2, 1959	July 20, 1963	May 9, 1967	February 25, 1971
151	153	155		
December 13, 1974	October 2, 1978	July 20, 1982		

=== Tritos series ===
This eclipse is a part of a tritos cycle, repeating at alternating nodes every 135 synodic months (≈ 3986.63 days, or 11 years minus 1 month). Their appearance and longitude are irregular due to a lack of synchronization with the anomalistic month (period of perigee), but groupings of 3 tritos cycles (≈ 33 years minus 3 months) come close (≈ 434.044 anomalistic months), so eclipses are similar in these groupings.

The partial solar eclipses on November 16, 2134 (part of Saros 164) and October 16, 2145 (part of Saros 165) are also a part of this series but are not included in the table below.

Series members between 1801 and 2069
June 6, 1807 (Saros 134)	May 5, 1818 (Saros 135)	April 3, 1829 (Saros 136)	March 4, 1840 (Saros 137)	February 1, 1851 (Saros 138)
December 31, 1861 (Saros 139)	November 30, 1872 (Saros 140)	October 30, 1883 (Saros 141)	September 29, 1894 (Saros 142)	August 30, 1905 (Saros 143)
July 30, 1916 (Saros 144)	June 29, 1927 (Saros 145)	May 29, 1938 (Saros 146)	April 28, 1949 (Saros 147)	March 27, 1960 (Saros 148)
February 25, 1971 (Saros 149)	January 25, 1982 (Saros 150)	December 24, 1992 (Saros 151)	November 23, 2003 (Saros 152)	October 23, 2014 (Saros 153)
September 21, 2025 (Saros 154)	August 21, 2036 (Saros 155)	July 22, 2047 (Saros 156)	June 21, 2058 (Saros 157)	May 20, 2069 (Saros 158)

=== Inex series ===
This eclipse is a part of the long period inex cycle, repeating at alternating nodes, every 358 synodic months (≈ 10,571.95 days, or 29 years minus 20 days). Their appearance and longitude are irregular due to a lack of synchronization with the anomalistic month (period of perigee). However, groupings of 3 inex cycles (≈ 87 years minus 2 months) comes close (≈ 1,151.02 anomalistic months), so eclipses are similar in these groupings.

Series members between 1801 and 2200
June 5, 1826 (Saros 144)	May 16, 1855 (Saros 145)	April 25, 1884 (Saros 146)
April 6, 1913 (Saros 147)	March 16, 1942 (Saros 148)	February 25, 1971 (Saros 149)
February 5, 2000 (Saros 150)	January 14, 2029 (Saros 151)	December 26, 2057 (Saros 152)
December 6, 2086 (Saros 153)	November 16, 2115 (Saros 154)	October 26, 2144 (Saros 155)
October 7, 2173 (Saros 156)		
