= Solar eclipse of April 20, 2061 =

Total eclipse

- Total eclipse
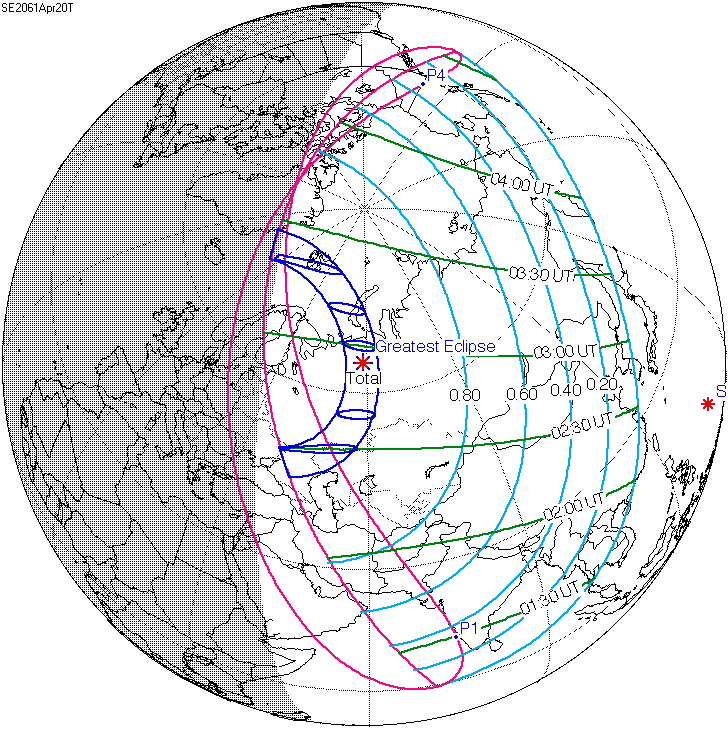
- Map
- Gamma: 0.9578
- Magnitude: 1.0475

Maximum eclipse
- Duration: 157 s (2 min 37 s)
- Coordinates: 64.5°N 59.2°E
- Max. width of band: 559 km (347 mi)

Times (UTC)
- Greatest eclipse: 2:56:49

References
- Saros: 149 (23 of 71)
- Catalog # (SE5000): 9644

A total solar eclipse will occur at the Moon's ascending node of orbit on Wednesday, April 20, 2061, with a magnitude of 1.0475. A solar eclipse occurs when the Moon passes between Earth and the Sun, thereby totally or partly obscuring the image of the Sun for a viewer on Earth. A total solar eclipse occurs when the Moon's apparent diameter is larger than the Sun's, blocking all direct sunlight, turning day into darkness. Totality occurs in a narrow path across Earth's surface, with the partial solar eclipse visible over a surrounding region thousands of kilometres wide. Occurring about 1.1 days before perigee (on April 21, 2061, at 4:00 UTC), the Moon's apparent diameter will be larger.

== Visibility ==
The eclipse will begin over Southern Russia and eastern Ukraine at sunrise and the moon shadow will move rapidly in a northeastern direction over west Kazakhstan (West Kazakhstan Region). The shadow will cover the Urals and races over the Arctic Ocean in a north-westerly direction and reaches the Svalbard archipelago. At sunset the eclipse will end just before the coast of Greenland.

The greatest eclipse will be in Russia on the east of Komi Republic (in Europe), ~120 km to south-east of Pechora.

A partial solar eclipse will also be visible for parts of Eastern Europe, Asia, Alaska, and northwestern Canada.

== Eclipse details ==
Shown below are two tables displaying details about this particular solar eclipse. The first table outlines times at which the Moon's penumbra or umbra attains the specific parameter, and the second table describes various other parameters pertaining to this eclipse.

April 20, 2061 Solar Eclipse Times
Event	Time (UTC)
First Penumbral External Contact	2061 April 20 at 00:52:32.9 UTC
First Umbral External Contact	2061 April 20 at 02:23:47.2 UTC
First Central Line	2061 April 20 at 02:27:39.9 UTC
First Umbral Internal Contact	2061 April 20 at 02:32:06.2 UTC
Greatest Eclipse	2061 April 20 at 02:56:49.1 UTC
Ecliptic Conjunction	2061 April 20 at 03:06:25.5 UTC
Equatorial Conjunction	2061 April 20 at 03:45:10.8 UTC
Greatest Duration	2061 April 20 at 09:41:30.5 UTC
Last Umbral Internal Contact	2061 April 20 at 03:21:00.1 UTC
Last Central Line	2061 April 20 at 03:25:27.9 UTC
Last Umbral External Contact	2061 April 20 at 03:29:22.2 UTC
Last Penumbral External Contact	2061 April 20 at 05:00:43.2 UTC

April 20, 2061 Solar Eclipse Parameters
Parameter	Value
Eclipse Magnitude	1.04755
Eclipse Obscuration	1.09736
Gamma	0.95776
Sun Right Ascension	01h53m47.8s
Sun Declination	+11°39'59.8"
Sun Semi-Diameter	15'55.3"
Sun Equatorial Horizontal Parallax	08.8"
Moon Right Ascension	01h52m03.2s
Moon Declination	+12°32'19.1"
Moon Semi-Diameter	16'36.4"
Moon Equatorial Horizontal Parallax	1°00'56.9"
ΔT	91.3 s

== Eclipse season ==
This eclipse is part of an eclipse season, a period, roughly every six months, when eclipses occur. Only two (or occasionally three) eclipse seasons occur each year, and each season lasts about 35 days and repeats just short of six months (173 days) later; thus two full eclipse seasons always occur each year. Either two or three eclipses happen each eclipse season. In the sequence below, each eclipse is separated by a fortnight.

Eclipse season of April 2061
April 4 Descending node (full moon)	April 20 Ascending node (new moon)
Total lunar eclipse Lunar Saros 123	Total solar eclipse Solar Saros 149

== Related eclipses ==
=== Eclipses in 2061 ===
- A total lunar eclipse on April 4.
- A total solar eclipse on April 20.
- A total lunar eclipse on September 29.
- An annular solar eclipse on October 13.

=== Metonic ===
- Preceded by: Solar eclipse of July 1, 2057
- Followed by: Solar eclipse of February 5, 2065

=== Tzolkinex ===
- Preceded by: Solar eclipse of March 9, 2054
- Followed by: Solar eclipse of May 31, 2068

=== Half-Saros ===
- Preceded by: Lunar eclipse of April 14, 2052
- Followed by: Lunar eclipse of April 25, 2070

=== Tritos ===
- Preceded by: Solar eclipse of May 20, 2050
- Followed by: Solar eclipse of March 19, 2072

=== Solar Saros 149 ===
- Preceded by: Solar eclipse of April 9, 2043
- Followed by: Solar eclipse of May 1, 2079

=== Inex ===
- Preceded by: Solar eclipse of May 9, 2032
- Followed by: Solar eclipse of March 31, 2090

=== Triad ===
- Preceded by: Solar eclipse of June 20, 1974
- Followed by: Solar eclipse of February 19, 2148

=== Solar eclipses of 2058–2061 ===
This eclipse is a member of a semester series. An eclipse in a semester series of solar eclipses repeats approximately every 177 days and 4 hours (a semester) at alternating nodes of the Moon's orbit.

The partial solar eclipse on June 21, 2058 occurs in the previous lunar year eclipse set.

Solar eclipse series sets from 2058 to 2061
Ascending node			Descending node		
Saros	Map	Gamma	Saros	Map	Gamma
119	May 22, 2058 Partial	−1.3194	124	November 16, 2058 Partial	1.1224
129	May 11, 2059 Total	−0.508	134	November 5, 2059 Annular	0.4454
139	April 30, 2060 Total	0.2422	144	October 24, 2060 Annular	−0.2625
149	April 20, 2061 Total	0.9578	154	October 13, 2061 Annular	−0.9639

=== Saros 149 ===
This eclipse is a part of Saros series 149, repeating every 18 years, 11 days, 8 hours and containing 71 events. The series started with a partial solar eclipse on August 21, 1664. It contains total eclipses from April 9, 2043 through October 2, 2331; hybrid eclipses from October 13, 2349 through November 3, 2385; and annular eclipses from November 15, 2403 through July 13, 2800. The series ends at member 71 as a partial eclipse on September 28, 2926. Its eclipses are tabulated in three columns; every third eclipse in the same column is one exeligmos apart, so they all cast shadows over approximately the same parts of the Earth.

The longest duration of totality will be produced by member 31 at 4 minutes, 10 seconds on July 17, 2205, and the longest duration of annularity will be produced by member 62 at 5 minutes, 6 seconds on June 21, 2764. All eclipses in this series occur at the Moon’s ascending node of orbit.

Series members 9–30 occur between 1801 and 2200:
9	10	11
November 18, 1808	November 29, 1826	December 9, 1844
12	13	14
December 21, 1862	December 31, 1880	January 11, 1899
15	16	17
January 23, 1917	February 3, 1935	February 14, 1953
18	19	20
February 25, 1971	March 7, 1989	March 19, 2007
21	22	23
March 29, 2025	April 9, 2043	April 20, 2061
24	25	26
May 1, 2079	May 11, 2097	May 24, 2115
27	28	29
June 3, 2133	June 14, 2151	June 25, 2169
30
July 6, 2187

=== Metonic series ===
The metonic series repeats eclipses every 19 years (6939.69 days), lasting about 5 cycles. Eclipses occur in nearly the same calendar date. In addition, the octon subseries repeats 1/5 of that or every 3.8 years (1387.94 days). All eclipses in this table occur at the Moon's ascending node.

21 eclipse events between July 1, 2000 and July 1, 2076
July 1–2	April 19–20	February 5–7	November 24–25	September 12–13
117	119	121	123	125
July 1, 2000	April 19, 2004	February 7, 2008	November 25, 2011	September 13, 2015
127	129	131	133	135
July 2, 2019	April 20, 2023	February 6, 2027	November 25, 2030	September 12, 2034
137	139	141	143	145
July 2, 2038	April 20, 2042	February 5, 2046	November 25, 2049	September 12, 2053
147	149	151	153	155
July 1, 2057	April 20, 2061	February 5, 2065	November 24, 2068	September 12, 2072
157
July 1, 2076

=== Tritos series ===
This eclipse is a part of a tritos cycle, repeating at alternating nodes every 135 synodic months (≈ 3986.63 days, or 11 years minus 1 month). Their appearance and longitude are irregular due to a lack of synchronization with the anomalistic month (period of perigee), but groupings of 3 tritos cycles (≈ 33 years minus 3 months) come close (≈ 434.044 anomalistic months), so eclipses are similar in these groupings.

Series members between 1801 and 2200
April 4, 1810 (Saros 126)	March 4, 1821 (Saros 127)	February 1, 1832 (Saros 128)	December 31, 1842 (Saros 129)	November 30, 1853 (Saros 130)
October 30, 1864 (Saros 131)	September 29, 1875 (Saros 132)	August 29, 1886 (Saros 133)	July 29, 1897 (Saros 134)	June 28, 1908 (Saros 135)
May 29, 1919 (Saros 136)	April 28, 1930 (Saros 137)	March 27, 1941 (Saros 138)	February 25, 1952 (Saros 139)	January 25, 1963 (Saros 140)
December 24, 1973 (Saros 141)	November 22, 1984 (Saros 142)	October 24, 1995 (Saros 143)	September 22, 2006 (Saros 144)	August 21, 2017 (Saros 145)
July 22, 2028 (Saros 146)	June 21, 2039 (Saros 147)	May 20, 2050 (Saros 148)	April 20, 2061 (Saros 149)	March 19, 2072 (Saros 150)
February 16, 2083 (Saros 151)	January 16, 2094 (Saros 152)	December 17, 2104 (Saros 153)	November 16, 2115 (Saros 154)	October 16, 2126 (Saros 155)
September 15, 2137 (Saros 156)	August 14, 2148 (Saros 157)	July 15, 2159 (Saros 158)	June 14, 2170 (Saros 159)	May 13, 2181 (Saros 160)
April 12, 2192 (Saros 161)

=== Inex series ===
This eclipse is a part of the long period inex cycle, repeating at alternating nodes, every 358 synodic months (≈ 10,571.95 days, or 29 years minus 20 days). Their appearance and longitude are irregular due to a lack of synchronization with the anomalistic month (period of perigee). However, groupings of 3 inex cycles (≈ 87 years minus 2 months) comes close (≈ 1,151.02 anomalistic months), so eclipses are similar in these groupings.

Series members between 1801 and 2200
September 28, 1829 (Saros 141)	September 7, 1858 (Saros 142)	August 19, 1887 (Saros 143)
July 30, 1916 (Saros 144)	July 9, 1945 (Saros 145)	June 20, 1974 (Saros 146)
May 31, 2003 (Saros 147)	May 9, 2032 (Saros 148)	April 20, 2061 (Saros 149)
March 31, 2090 (Saros 150)	March 11, 2119 (Saros 151)	February 19, 2148 (Saros 152)
January 29, 2177 (Saros 153)		
