= Solar eclipse of May 11, 2097 =

Total eclipse

- Total eclipse
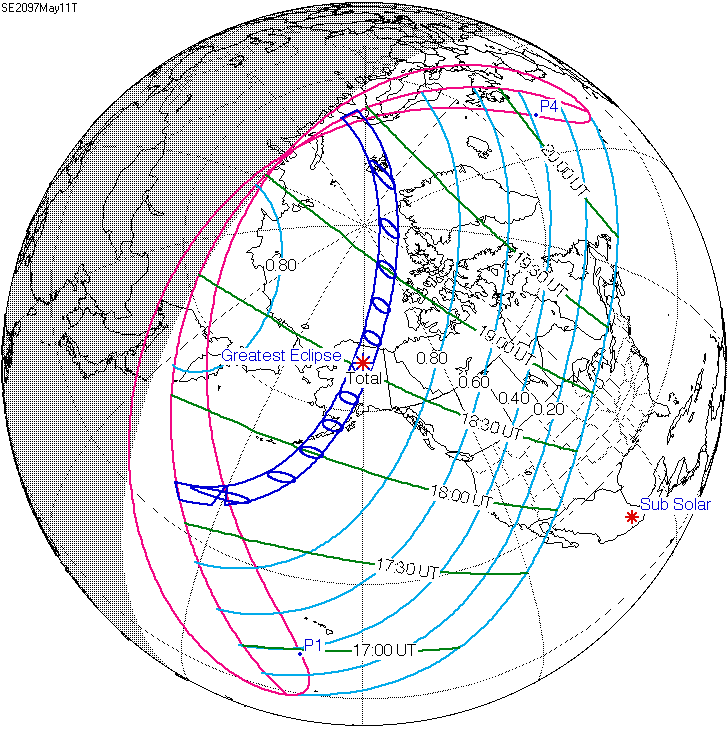
- Map
- Gamma: 0.8516
- Magnitude: 1.0538

Maximum eclipse
- Duration: 190 s (3 min 10 s)
- Coordinates: 67.4°N 149.5°W
- Max. width of band: 339 km (211 mi)

Times (UTC)
- Greatest eclipse: 34:31

References
- Saros: 149 (25 of 71)
- Catalog # (SE5000): 9726

A total solar eclipse will occur at the Moon's ascending node of orbit on Saturday, May 11, 2097, with a magnitude of 1.0538. A solar eclipse occurs when the Moon passes between Earth and the Sun, thereby totally or partly obscuring the image of the Sun for a viewer on Earth. A total solar eclipse occurs when the Moon's apparent diameter is larger than the Sun's, blocking all direct sunlight, turning day into darkness. Totality occurs in a narrow path across Earth's surface, with the partial solar eclipse visible over a surrounding region thousands of kilometres wide. Occurring about 1.3 days before perigee (on May 13, 2097, at 1:30 UTC), the Moon's apparent diameter will be larger.

The path of totality will be visible from parts of Alaska, Svalbard, northeastern Norway (Finnmark), and northwestern Russia. A partial solar eclipse will also be visible for parts of Hawaii, northern Russia, Canada, the northwestern United States, Greenland, and Northern Europe.

== Eclipse details ==
Shown below are two tables displaying details about this particular solar eclipse. The first table outlines times at which the Moon's penumbra or umbra attains the specific parameter, and the second table describes various other parameters pertaining to this eclipse.

May 11, 2097 Solar Eclipse Times
| Event | Time (UTC) |
|---|---|
| First Penumbral External Contact | 2097 May 11 at 16:21:50.6 UTC |
| First Umbral External Contact | 2097 May 11 at 17:38:00.1 UTC |
| First Central Line | 2097 May 11 at 17:40:15.9 UTC |
| First Umbral Internal Contact | 2097 May 11 at 17:42:36.0 UTC |
| Greatest Eclipse | 2097 May 11 at 18:34:31.4 UTC |
| Greatest Duration | 2097 May 11 at 18:35:50.5 UTC |
| Ecliptic Conjunction | 2097 May 11 at 18:43:07.3 UTC |
| Equatorial Conjunction | 2097 May 11 at 19:07:38.5 UTC |
| Last Umbral Internal Contact | 2097 May 11 at 19:26:03.9 UTC |
| Last Central Line | 2097 May 11 at 19:28:25.7 UTC |
| Last Umbral External Contact | 2097 May 11 at 19:30:43.3 UTC |
| Last Penumbral External Contact | 2097 May 11 at 20:46:55.7 UTC |

May 11, 2097 Solar Eclipse Parameters
| Parameter | Value |
|---|---|
| Eclipse Magnitude | 1.05381 |
| Eclipse Obscuration | 1.11052 |
| Gamma | 0.85156 |
| Sun Right Ascension | 03h17m49.7s |
| Sun Declination | +18°13'35.1" |
| Sun Semi-Diameter | 15'50.2" |
| Sun Equatorial Horizontal Parallax | 08.7" |
| Moon Right Ascension | 03h16m33.2s |
| Moon Declination | +19°01'53.1" |
| Moon Semi-Diameter | 16'32.8" |
| Moon Equatorial Horizontal Parallax | 1°00'43.7" |
| ΔT | 121.0 s |

== Eclipse season ==
This eclipse is part of an eclipse season, a period, roughly every six months, when eclipses occur. Only two (or occasionally three) eclipse seasons occur each year, and each season lasts about 35 days and repeats just short of six months (173 days) later; thus two full eclipse seasons always occur each year. Either two or three eclipses happen each eclipse season. In the sequence below, each eclipse is separated by a fortnight.

Eclipse season of April–May 2097
| April 26 Descending node (full moon) | May 11 Ascending node (new moon) |
|---|---|
| Partial lunar eclipse Lunar Saros 123 | Total solar eclipse Solar Saros 149 |

== Related eclipses ==
=== Eclipses in 2097 ===
- A partial lunar eclipse on April 26.
- A total solar eclipse on May 11.
- A total lunar eclipse on October 21.
- An annular solar eclipse on November 4.

=== Metonic ===
- Preceded by: Solar eclipse of July 23, 2093
- Followed by: Solar eclipse of February 28, 2101

=== Tzolkinex ===
- Preceded by: Solar eclipse of March 31, 2090
- Followed by: Solar eclipse of June 22, 2104

=== Half-Saros ===
- Preceded by: Lunar eclipse of May 5, 2088
- Followed by: Lunar eclipse of May 17, 2106

=== Tritos ===
- Preceded by: Solar eclipse of June 11, 2086
- Followed by: Solar eclipse of April 11, 2108

=== Solar Saros 149 ===
- Preceded by: Solar eclipse of May 1, 2079
- Followed by: Solar eclipse of May 24, 2115

=== Inex ===
- Preceded by: Solar eclipse of May 31, 2068
- Followed by: Solar eclipse of April 22, 2126

=== Triad ===
- Preceded by: Solar eclipse of July 11, 2010
- Followed by: Solar eclipse of March 12, 2184

=== Solar eclipses of 2094–2098 ===
This eclipse is a member of a semester series. An eclipse in a semester series of solar eclipses repeats approximately every 177 days and 4 hours (a semester) at alternating nodes of the Moon's orbit.

The solar eclipses on January 16, 2094 (total) and July 12, 2094 (partial) occur in the previous lunar year eclipse set, and the partial solar eclipses on April 1, 2098 and September 25, 2098 occur in the next lunar year eclipse set.

Solar eclipse series sets from 2094 to 2098
| Ascending node | | | Descending node | | |
| Saros | Map | Gamma | Saros | Map | Gamma |
| 119 | June 13, 2094 Partial | −1.4613 | 124 | December 7, 2094 Partial | 1.1547 |
| 129 | June 2, 2095 Total | −0.6396 | 134 | November 27, 2095 Annular | 0.4903 |
| 139 | May 22, 2096 Total | 0.1196 | 144 | November 15, 2096 Annular | −0.20 |
| 149 | May 11, 2097 Total | 0.8516 | 154 | November 4, 2097 Annular | −0.8926 |
| 159 | May 1, 2098 | | 164 | October 24, 2098 Partial | −1.5407 |

=== Saros 149 ===
This eclipse is a part of Saros series 149, repeating every 18 years, 11 days, 8 hours and containing 71 events. The series started with a partial solar eclipse on August 21, 1664. It contains total eclipses from April 9, 2043 through October 2, 2331; hybrid eclipses from October 13, 2349 through November 3, 2385; and annular eclipses from November 15, 2403 through July 13, 2800. The series ends at member 71 as a partial eclipse on September 28, 2926. Its eclipses are tabulated in three columns; every third eclipse in the same column is one exeligmos apart, so they all cast shadows over approximately the same parts of the Earth.

The longest duration of totality will be produced by member 31 at 4 minutes, 10 seconds on July 17, 2205, and the longest duration of annularity will be produced by member 62 at 5 minutes, 6 seconds on June 21, 2764. All eclipses in this series occur at the Moon’s ascending node of orbit.

Series members 9–30 occur between 1801 and 2200:
| 9 | 10 | 11 |
|---|---|---|
| November 18, 1808 | November 29, 1826 | December 9, 1844 |
| 12 | 13 | 14 |
| December 21, 1862 | December 31, 1880 | January 11, 1899 |
| 15 | 16 | 17 |
| January 23, 1917 | February 3, 1935 | February 14, 1953 |
| 18 | 19 | 20 |
| February 25, 1971 | March 7, 1989 | March 19, 2007 |
| 21 | 22 | 23 |
| March 29, 2025 | April 9, 2043 | April 20, 2061 |
| 24 | 25 | 26 |
| May 1, 2079 | May 11, 2097 | May 24, 2115 |
| 27 | 28 | 29 |
| June 3, 2133 | June 14, 2151 | June 25, 2169 |
30
July 6, 2187

=== Metonic series ===
The metonic series repeats eclipses every 19 years (6939.69 days), lasting about 5 cycles. Eclipses occur in nearly the same calendar date. In addition, the octon subseries repeats 1/5 of that or every 3.8 years (1387.94 days). All eclipses in this table occur at the Moon's ascending node.

21 eclipse events between July 23, 2036 and July 23, 2112
| July 23–24 | May 11 | February 27–28 | December 16–17 | October 4–5 |
| 117 | 119 | 121 | 123 | 125 |
|---|---|---|---|---|
| July 23, 2036 | May 11, 2040 | February 28, 2044 | December 16, 2047 | October 4, 2051 |
| 127 | 129 | 131 | 133 | 135 |
| July 24, 2055 | May 11, 2059 | February 28, 2063 | December 17, 2066 | October 4, 2070 |
| 137 | 139 | 141 | 143 | 145 |
| July 24, 2074 | May 11, 2078 | February 27, 2082 | December 16, 2085 | October 4, 2089 |
| 147 | 149 | 151 | 153 | 155 |
| July 23, 2093 | May 11, 2097 | February 28, 2101 | December 17, 2104 | October 5, 2108 |
157
July 23, 2112

=== Tritos series ===
This eclipse is a part of a tritos cycle, repeating at alternating nodes every 135 synodic months (≈ 3986.63 days, or 11 years minus 1 month). Their appearance and longitude are irregular due to a lack of synchronization with the anomalistic month (period of perigee), but groupings of 3 tritos cycles (≈ 33 years minus 3 months) come close (≈ 434.044 anomalistic months), so eclipses are similar in these groupings.

Series members between 1801 and 2200
| August 28, 1802 (Saros 122) | July 27, 1813 (Saros 123) | June 26, 1824 (Saros 124) | May 27, 1835 (Saros 125) | April 25, 1846 (Saros 126) |
| March 25, 1857 (Saros 127) | February 23, 1868 (Saros 128) | January 22, 1879 (Saros 129) | December 22, 1889 (Saros 130) | November 22, 1900 (Saros 131) |
| October 22, 1911 (Saros 132) | September 21, 1922 (Saros 133) | August 21, 1933 (Saros 134) | July 20, 1944 (Saros 135) | June 20, 1955 (Saros 136) |
| May 20, 1966 (Saros 137) | April 18, 1977 (Saros 138) | March 18, 1988 (Saros 139) | February 16, 1999 (Saros 140) | January 15, 2010 (Saros 141) |
| December 14, 2020 (Saros 142) | November 14, 2031 (Saros 143) | October 14, 2042 (Saros 144) | September 12, 2053 (Saros 145) | August 12, 2064 (Saros 146) |
| July 13, 2075 (Saros 147) | June 11, 2086 (Saros 148) | May 11, 2097 (Saros 149) | April 11, 2108 (Saros 150) | March 11, 2119 (Saros 151) |
| February 8, 2130 (Saros 152) | January 8, 2141 (Saros 153) | December 8, 2151 (Saros 154) | November 7, 2162 (Saros 155) | October 7, 2173 (Saros 156) |
| September 4, 2184 (Saros 157) | August 5, 2195 (Saros 158) | | | |

=== Inex series ===
This eclipse is a part of the long period inex cycle, repeating at alternating nodes, every 358 synodic months (≈ 10,571.95 days, or 29 years minus 20 days). Their appearance and longitude are irregular due to a lack of synchronization with the anomalistic month (period of perigee). However, groupings of 3 inex cycles (≈ 87 years minus 2 months) comes close (≈ 1,151.02 anomalistic months), so eclipses are similar in these groupings.

Series members between 1801 and 2200
| November 29, 1807 (Saros 139) | November 9, 1836 (Saros 140) | October 19, 1865 (Saros 141) |
| September 29, 1894 (Saros 142) | September 10, 1923 (Saros 143) | August 20, 1952 (Saros 144) |
| July 31, 1981 (Saros 145) | July 11, 2010 (Saros 146) | June 21, 2039 (Saros 147) |
| May 31, 2068 (Saros 148) | May 11, 2097 (Saros 149) | April 22, 2126 (Saros 150) |
| April 2, 2155 (Saros 151) | March 12, 2184 (Saros 152) | |
