= Solar eclipse of July 12, 2056 =

Future annular solar eclipse

- Annular eclipse
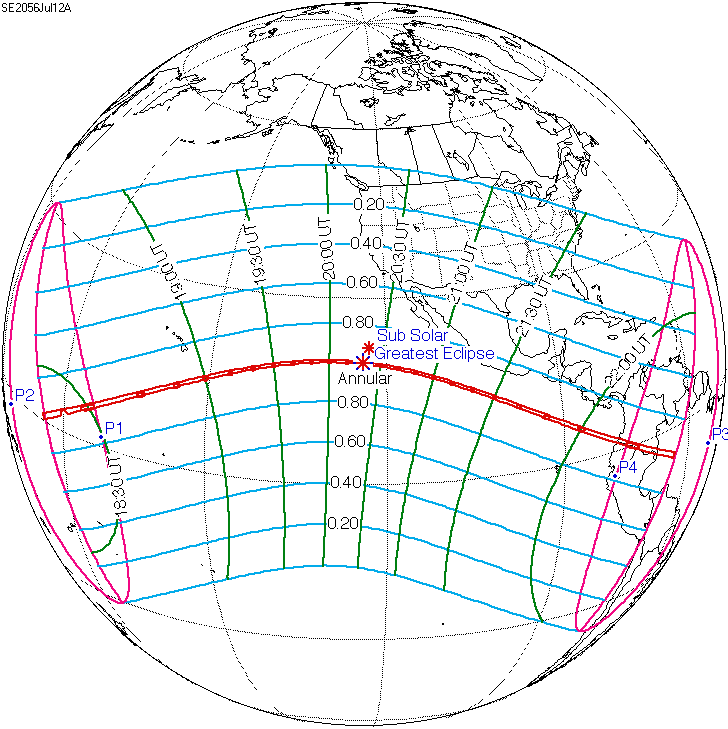
- Map
- Gamma: −0.0426
- Magnitude: 0.9878

Maximum eclipse
- Duration: 86 s (1 min 26 s)
- Coordinates: 19.4°N 123.7°W
- Max. width of band: 43 km (27 mi)

Times (UTC)
- Greatest eclipse: 20:21:59

References
- Saros: 137 (38 of 70)
- Catalog # (SE5000): 9633

An annular solar eclipse will occur at the Moon's ascending node of orbit on Wednesday, July 12, 2056, with a magnitude of 0.9878. A solar eclipse occurs when the Moon passes between Earth and the Sun, thereby totally or partly obscuring the image of the Sun for a viewer on Earth. An annular solar eclipse occurs when the Moon's apparent diameter is smaller than the Sun's, blocking most of the Sun's light and causing the Sun to look like an annulus (ring). An annular eclipse appears as a partial eclipse over a region of the Earth thousands of kilometres wide. Occurring about 5.8 days after apogee (on July 7, 2056, at 1:55 UTC), the Moon's apparent diameter will be smaller.

The path of annularity will be visible from parts of Kiribati, northern Ecuador, southern Colombia, extreme northern Peru, and western Brazil. A partial solar eclipse will also be visible for parts of eastern Oceania, Hawaii, the United States, Mexico, Central America, the Caribbean, and western South America.

== Eclipse details ==
Shown below are two tables displaying details about this particular solar eclipse. The first table outlines times at which the Moon's penumbra or umbra attains the specific parameter, and the second table describes various other parameters pertaining to this eclipse.

July 12, 2056 Solar Eclipse Times
Event	Time (UTC)
First Penumbral External Contact	2056 July 12 at 17:25:55.8 UTC
First Umbral External Contact	2056 July 12 at 18:27:52.3 UTC
First Central Line	2056 July 12 at 18:28:47.6 UTC
Greatest Duration	2056 July 12 at 18:28:47.6 UTC
First Umbral Internal Contact	2056 July 12 at 18:29:42.9 UTC
First Penumbral Internal Contact	2056 July 12 at 19:31:43.2 UTC
Ecliptic Conjunction	2056 July 12 at 20:21:30.5 UTC
Greatest Eclipse	2056 July 12 at 20:21:59.4 UTC
Equatorial Conjunction	2056 July 12 at 20:22:15.6 UTC
Last Penumbral Internal Contact	2056 July 12 at 21:12:16.2 UTC
Last Umbral Internal Contact	2056 July 12 at 22:14:17.7 UTC
Last Central Line	2056 July 12 at 22:15:10.1 UTC
Last Umbral External Contact	2056 July 12 at 22:16:02.6 UTC
Last Penumbral External Contact	2056 July 12 at 23:17:56.6 UTC

July 12, 2056 Solar Eclipse Parameters
Parameter	Value
Eclipse Magnitude	0.98777
Eclipse Obscuration	0.97570
Gamma	−0.04261
Sun Right Ascension	07h31m42.7s
Sun Declination	+21°45'32.5"
Sun Semi-Diameter	15'44.0"
Sun Equatorial Horizontal Parallax	08.7"
Moon Right Ascension	07h31m42.1s
Moon Declination	+21°43'09.5"
Moon Semi-Diameter	15'17.9"
Moon Equatorial Horizontal Parallax	0°56'08.9"
ΔT	88.1 s

== Eclipse season ==
This eclipse is part of an eclipse season, a period, roughly every six months, when eclipses occur. Only two (or occasionally three) eclipse seasons occur each year, and each season lasts about 35 days and repeats just short of six months (173 days) later; thus two full eclipse seasons always occur each year. Either two or three eclipses happen each eclipse season. In the sequence below, each eclipse is separated by a fortnight. The first and last eclipse in this sequence is separated by one synodic month.

Eclipse season of June–July 2056
June 27 Descending node (full moon)	July 12 Ascending node (new moon)	July 26 Descending node (full moon)
Penumbral lunar eclipse Lunar Saros 111	Annular solar eclipse Solar Saros 137	Penumbral lunar eclipse Lunar Saros 149

== Related eclipses ==
=== Eclipses in 2056 ===
- An annular solar eclipse on January 16.
- A penumbral lunar eclipse on February 1.
- A penumbral lunar eclipse on June 27.
- An annular solar eclipse on July 12.
- A penumbral lunar eclipse on July 26.
- A penumbral lunar eclipse on December 22.

=== Metonic ===
- Preceded by: Solar eclipse of September 22, 2052
- Followed by: Solar eclipse of April 30, 2060

=== Tzolkinex ===
- Preceded by: Solar eclipse of May 31, 2049
- Followed by: Solar eclipse of August 24, 2063

=== Half-Saros ===
- Preceded by: Lunar eclipse of July 7, 2047
- Followed by: Lunar eclipse of July 17, 2065

=== Tritos ===
- Preceded by: Solar eclipse of August 12, 2045
- Followed by: Solar eclipse of June 11, 2067

=== Solar Saros 137 ===
- Preceded by: Solar eclipse of July 2, 2038
- Followed by: Solar eclipse of July 24, 2074

=== Inex ===
- Preceded by: Solar eclipse of August 2, 2027
- Followed by: Solar eclipse of June 22, 2085

=== Triad ===
- Preceded by: Solar eclipse of September 11, 1969
- Followed by: Solar eclipse of May 14, 2143

=== Solar eclipses of 2054–2058 ===
This eclipse is a member of a semester series. An eclipse in a semester series of solar eclipses repeats approximately every 177 days and 4 hours (a semester) at alternating nodes of the Moon's orbit.

The partial solar eclipses on March 9, 2054 and September 2, 2054 occur in the previous lunar year eclipse set, and the partial solar eclipses on May 22, 2058 and November 16, 2058 occur in the next lunar year eclipse set.

Solar eclipse series sets from 2054 to 2058
Ascending node			Descending node		
Saros	Map	Gamma	Saros	Map	Gamma
117	August 3, 2054 Partial	−1.4941	122	January 27, 2055 Partial	1.155
127	July 24, 2055 Total	−0.8012	132	January 16, 2056 Annular	0.4199
137	July 12, 2056 Annular	−0.0426	142	January 5, 2057 Total	−0.2837
147	July 1, 2057 Annular	0.7455	152	December 26, 2057 Total	−0.9405
157	June 21, 2058 Partial	1.4869			

=== Saros 137 ===
This eclipse is a part of Saros series 137, repeating every 18 years, 11 days, and containing 70 events. The series started with a partial solar eclipse on May 25, 1389. It contains total eclipses from August 20, 1533 through December 6, 1695; the first set of hybrid eclipses from December 17, 1713 through February 11, 1804; the first set of annular eclipses from February 21, 1822 through March 25, 1876; the second set of hybrid eclipses from April 6, 1894 through April 28, 1930; and the second set of annular eclipses from May 9, 1948 through April 13, 2507. The series ends at member 70 as a partial eclipse on June 28, 2633. Its eclipses are tabulated in three columns; every third eclipse in the same column is one exeligmos apart, so they all cast shadows over approximately the same parts of the Earth.

The longest duration of totality was produced by member 11 at 2 minutes, 55 seconds on September 10, 1569, and the longest duration of annularity will be produced by member 59 at 7 minutes, 5 seconds on February 28, 2435. All eclipses in this series occur at the Moon’s ascending node of orbit.

Series members 24–46 occur between 1801 and 2200:
24	25	26
February 11, 1804	February 21, 1822	March 4, 1840
27	28	29
March 15, 1858	March 25, 1876	April 6, 1894
30	31	32
April 17, 1912	April 28, 1930	May 9, 1948
33	34	35
May 20, 1966	May 30, 1984	June 10, 2002
36	37	38
June 21, 2020	July 2, 2038	July 12, 2056
39	40	41
July 24, 2074	August 3, 2092	August 15, 2110
42	43	44
August 25, 2128	September 6, 2146	September 16, 2164
45	46	
September 27, 2182	October 9, 2200	

=== Metonic series ===
The metonic series repeats eclipses every 19 years (6939.69 days), lasting about 5 cycles. Eclipses occur in nearly the same calendar date. In addition, the octon subseries repeats 1/5 of that or every 3.8 years (1387.94 days). All eclipses in this table occur at the Moon's ascending node.

21 eclipse events between July 13, 2018 and July 12, 2094
July 12–13	April 30–May 1	February 16–17	December 5–6	September 22–23
117	119	121	123	125
July 13, 2018	April 30, 2022	February 17, 2026	December 5, 2029	September 23, 2033
127	129	131	133	135
July 13, 2037	April 30, 2041	February 16, 2045	December 5, 2048	September 22, 2052
137	139	141	143	145
July 12, 2056	April 30, 2060	February 17, 2064	December 6, 2067	September 23, 2071
147	149	151	153	155
July 13, 2075	May 1, 2079	February 16, 2083	December 6, 2086	September 23, 2090
157
July 12, 2094

=== Tritos series ===
This eclipse is a part of a tritos cycle, repeating at alternating nodes every 135 synodic months (≈ 3986.63 days, or 11 years minus 1 month). Their appearance and longitude are irregular due to a lack of synchronization with the anomalistic month (period of perigee), but groupings of 3 tritos cycles (≈ 33 years minus 3 months) come close (≈ 434.044 anomalistic months), so eclipses are similar in these groupings.

Series members between 1801 and 2200
June 26, 1805 (Saros 114)	May 27, 1816 (Saros 115)	April 26, 1827 (Saros 116)	March 25, 1838 (Saros 117)	February 23, 1849 (Saros 118)
January 23, 1860 (Saros 119)	December 22, 1870 (Saros 120)	November 21, 1881 (Saros 121)	October 20, 1892 (Saros 122)	September 21, 1903 (Saros 123)
August 21, 1914 (Saros 124)	July 20, 1925 (Saros 125)	June 19, 1936 (Saros 126)	May 20, 1947 (Saros 127)	April 19, 1958 (Saros 128)
March 18, 1969 (Saros 129)	February 16, 1980 (Saros 130)	January 15, 1991 (Saros 131)	December 14, 2001 (Saros 132)	November 13, 2012 (Saros 133)
October 14, 2023 (Saros 134)	September 12, 2034 (Saros 135)	August 12, 2045 (Saros 136)	July 12, 2056 (Saros 137)	June 11, 2067 (Saros 138)
May 11, 2078 (Saros 139)	April 10, 2089 (Saros 140)	March 10, 2100 (Saros 141)	February 8, 2111 (Saros 142)	January 8, 2122 (Saros 143)
December 7, 2132 (Saros 144)	November 7, 2143 (Saros 145)	October 7, 2154 (Saros 146)	September 5, 2165 (Saros 147)	August 4, 2176 (Saros 148)
July 6, 2187 (Saros 149)	June 4, 2198 (Saros 150)			

=== Inex series ===
This eclipse is a part of the long period inex cycle, repeating at alternating nodes, every 358 synodic months (≈ 10,571.95 days, or 29 years minus 20 days). Their appearance and longitude are irregular due to a lack of synchronization with the anomalistic month (period of perigee). However, groupings of 3 inex cycles (≈ 87 years minus 2 months) comes close (≈ 1,151.02 anomalistic months), so eclipses are similar in these groupings.

Series members between 1801 and 2200
December 20, 1824 (Saros 129)	November 30, 1853 (Saros 130)	November 10, 1882 (Saros 131)
October 22, 1911 (Saros 132)	October 1, 1940 (Saros 133)	September 11, 1969 (Saros 134)
August 22, 1998 (Saros 135)	August 2, 2027 (Saros 136)	July 12, 2056 (Saros 137)
June 22, 2085 (Saros 138)	June 3, 2114 (Saros 139)	May 14, 2143 (Saros 140)
April 23, 2172 (Saros 141)		
