= Solar eclipse of February 4, 1981 =

20th-century annular solar eclipse

- Annular eclipse
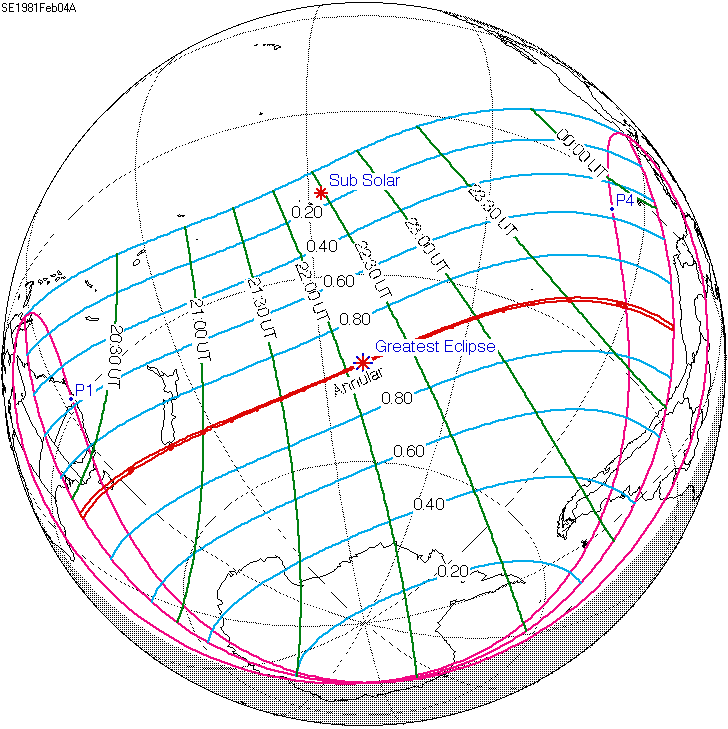
- Map
- Gamma: −0.4838
- Magnitude: 0.9937

Maximum eclipse
- Duration: 33 s (0 min 33 s)
- Coordinates: 44.4°S 140.8°W
- Max. width of band: 25 km (16 mi)

Times (UTC)
- Greatest eclipse: 22:09:24

References
- Saros: 140 (27 of 71)
- Catalog # (SE5000): 9466

An annular solar eclipse occurred at the Moon's descending node of orbit between Wednesday, February 4 and Thursday, February 5, 1981, with a magnitude of 0.9937. A solar eclipse occurs when the Moon passes between Earth and the Sun, thereby totally or partly obscuring the image of the Sun for a viewer on Earth. An annular solar eclipse occurs when the Moon's apparent diameter is smaller than the Sun's, blocking most of the Sun's light and causing the Sun to look like an annulus (ring). An annular eclipse appears as a partial eclipse over a region of the Earth thousands of kilometres wide. The Moon's apparent diameter was near the average diameter because it occurred 8.1 days after apogee (on January 27, 1981, at 20:30 UTC) and 4 days before perigee (on February 8, 1981, at 22:30 UTC).

The moon's apparent diameter was 7 arcseconds smaller than the July 31, 1981 total solar eclipse.

It was visible in Australia, crossing over Tasmania and southern Stewart Island of New Zealand near sunrise on February 5 (Thursday), and ended at sunset over western South America on February 4 (Wednesday). A partial eclipse was visible for parts of Eastern Australia, Oceania, Antarctica, and western South America.

== Observations ==
The Astronomical Society of Tasmania set up 18 observation sites on the northern and southern edges of the path of annularity in Tasmania to measure the diameter of the Sun. However, data were obtained from only one site on the northern and one on the southern edge due to the clouds. The United States Naval Observatory also took images of the partial phase with portable video recorders in Tasmania. Besides, due to the influence of the concave and convex peaks on the edge of the Moon, if the Moon is assumed to be a uniform sphere, the predicted times of each contact of the eclipse were slightly different from the actual times because the predictions assumed the Moon to be a circular body but there are actually mountains and valleys on the lunar limb. The British Astronomical Association observed this eclipse in Tasmania and studied the methods to calculate the time of eclipses more accurately.

== Eclipse details ==
Shown below are two tables displaying details about this particular solar eclipse. The first table outlines times at which the Moon's penumbra or umbra attains the specific parameter, and the second table describes various other parameters pertaining to this eclipse.

February 4, 1981 Solar Eclipse Times
Event	Time (UTC)
First Penumbral External Contact	1981 February 04 at 19:28:42.2 UTC
First Umbral External Contact	1981 February 04 at 20:33:25.0 UTC
First Central Line	1981 February 04 at 20:34:09.9 UTC
Greatest Duration	1981 February 04 at 20:34:09.9 UTC
First Umbral Internal Contact	1981 February 04 at 20:34:54.9 UTC
Equatorial Conjunction	1981 February 04 at 21:58:30.2 UTC
Greatest Eclipse	1981 February 04 at 22:09:23.5 UTC
Ecliptic Conjunction	1981 February 04 at 22:14:36.9 UTC
Last Umbral Internal Contact	1981 February 04 at 23:44:02.3 UTC
Last Central Line	1981 February 04 at 23:44:44.4 UTC
Last Umbral External Contact	1981 February 04 at 23:45:26.3 UTC
Last Penumbral External Contact	1981 February 05 at 00:50:03.7 UTC

February 4, 1981 Solar Eclipse Parameters
Parameter	Value
Eclipse Magnitude	0.99375
Eclipse Obscuration	0.98754
Gamma	−0.48375
Sun Right Ascension	21h13m55.8s
Sun Declination	-16°02'03.1"
Sun Semi-Diameter	16'13.2"
Sun Equatorial Horizontal Parallax	08.9"
Moon Right Ascension	21h14m19.6s
Moon Declination	-16°29'36.7"
Moon Semi-Diameter	15'53.6"
Moon Equatorial Horizontal Parallax	0°58'19.6"
ΔT	51.4 s

== Eclipse season ==
This eclipse is part of an eclipse season, a period, roughly every six months, when eclipses occur. Only two (or occasionally three) eclipse seasons occur each year, and each season lasts about 35 days and repeats just short of six months (173 days) later; thus two full eclipse seasons always occur each year. Either two or three eclipses happen each eclipse season. In the sequence below, each eclipse is separated by a fortnight.

Eclipse season of January–February 1981
January 20 Ascending node (full moon)	February 4 Descending node (new moon)
Penumbral lunar eclipse Lunar Saros 114	Annular solar eclipse Solar Saros 140

== Related eclipses ==
=== Eclipses in 1981 ===
- A penumbral lunar eclipse on January 20.
- An annular solar eclipse on February 4.
- A partial lunar eclipse on July 17.
- A total solar eclipse on July 31.

=== Metonic ===
- Preceded by: Solar eclipse of April 18, 1977
- Followed by: Solar eclipse of November 22, 1984

=== Tzolkinex ===
- Preceded by: Solar eclipse of December 24, 1973
- Followed by: Solar eclipse of March 18, 1988

=== Half-Saros ===
- Preceded by: Lunar eclipse of January 30, 1972
- Followed by: Lunar eclipse of February 9, 1990

=== Tritos ===
- Preceded by: Solar eclipse of March 7, 1970
- Followed by: Solar eclipse of January 4, 1992

=== Solar Saros 140 ===
- Preceded by: Solar eclipse of January 25, 1963
- Followed by: Solar eclipse of February 16, 1999

=== Inex ===
- Preceded by: Solar eclipse of February 25, 1952
- Followed by: Solar eclipse of January 15, 2010

=== Triad ===
- Preceded by: Solar eclipse of April 6, 1894
- Followed by: Solar eclipse of December 6, 2067

=== Solar eclipses of 1979–1982 ===
This eclipse is a member of a semester series. An eclipse in a semester series of solar eclipses repeats approximately every 177 days and 4 hours (a semester) at alternating nodes of the Moon's orbit.

The partial solar eclipses on June 21, 1982 and December 15, 1982 occur in the next lunar year eclipse set.

Solar eclipse series sets from 1979 to 1982
Descending node			Ascending node		
Saros	Map	Gamma	Saros	Map	Gamma
120 Totality in Brandon, MB, Canada	February 26, 1979 Total	0.8981	125	August 22, 1979 Annular	−0.9632
130	February 16, 1980 Total	0.2224	135	August 10, 1980 Annular	−0.1915
140	February 4, 1981 Annular	−0.4838	145	July 31, 1981 Total	0.5792
150	January 25, 1982 Partial	−1.2311	155	July 20, 1982 Partial	1.2886

=== Saros 140 ===
This eclipse is a part of Saros series 140, repeating every 18 years, 11 days, and containing 71 events. The series started with a partial solar eclipse on April 16, 1512. It contains total eclipses from July 21, 1656 through November 9, 1836; hybrid eclipses from November 20, 1854 through December 23, 1908; and annular eclipses from January 3, 1927 through December 7, 2485. The series ends at member 71 as a partial eclipse on June 1, 2774. Its eclipses are tabulated in three columns; every third eclipse in the same column is one exeligmos apart, so they all cast shadows over approximately the same parts of the Earth.

The longest duration of totality was produced by member 11 at 4 minutes, 10 seconds on August 12, 1692, and the longest duration of annularity will be produced by member 53 at 7 minutes, 35 seconds on November 15, 2449. All eclipses in this series occur at the Moon’s descending node of orbit.

Series members 18–39 occur between 1801 and 2200:
18	19	20
October 29, 1818	November 9, 1836	November 20, 1854
21	22	23
November 30, 1872	December 12, 1890	December 23, 1908
24	25	26
January 3, 1927	January 14, 1945	January 25, 1963
27	28	29
February 4, 1981	February 16, 1999	February 26, 2017
30	31	32
March 9, 2035	March 20, 2053	March 31, 2071
33	34	35
April 10, 2089	April 23, 2107	May 3, 2125
36	37	38
May 14, 2143	May 25, 2161	June 5, 2179
39
June 15, 2197

=== Metonic series ===
The metonic series repeats eclipses every 19 years (6939.69 days), lasting about 5 cycles. Eclipses occur in nearly the same calendar date. In addition, the octon subseries repeats 1/5 of that or every 3.8 years (1387.94 days). All eclipses in this table occur at the Moon's descending node.

22 eclipse events between September 12, 1931 and July 1, 2011
September 11–12	June 30–July 1	April 17–19	February 4–5	November 22–23
114	116	118	120	122
September 12, 1931	June 30, 1935	April 19, 1939	February 4, 1943	November 23, 1946
124	126	128	130	132
September 12, 1950	June 30, 1954	April 19, 1958	February 5, 1962	November 23, 1965
134	136	138	140	142
September 11, 1969	June 30, 1973	April 18, 1977	February 4, 1981	November 22, 1984
144	146	148	150	152
September 11, 1988	June 30, 1992	April 17, 1996	February 5, 2000	November 23, 2003
154	156			
September 11, 2007	July 1, 2011			

=== Tritos series ===
This eclipse is a part of a tritos cycle, repeating at alternating nodes every 135 synodic months (≈ 3986.63 days, or 11 years minus 1 month). Their appearance and longitude are irregular due to a lack of synchronization with the anomalistic month (period of perigee), but groupings of 3 tritos cycles (≈ 33 years minus 3 months) come close (≈ 434.044 anomalistic months), so eclipses are similar in these groupings.

Series members between 1801 and 2200
June 16, 1806 (Saros 124)	May 16, 1817 (Saros 125)	April 14, 1828 (Saros 126)	March 15, 1839 (Saros 127)	February 12, 1850 (Saros 128)
January 11, 1861 (Saros 129)	December 12, 1871 (Saros 130)	November 10, 1882 (Saros 131)	October 9, 1893 (Saros 132)	September 9, 1904 (Saros 133)
August 10, 1915 (Saros 134)	July 9, 1926 (Saros 135)	June 8, 1937 (Saros 136)	May 9, 1948 (Saros 137)	April 8, 1959 (Saros 138)
March 7, 1970 (Saros 139)	February 4, 1981 (Saros 140)	January 4, 1992 (Saros 141)	December 4, 2002 (Saros 142)	November 3, 2013 (Saros 143)
October 2, 2024 (Saros 144)	September 2, 2035 (Saros 145)	August 2, 2046 (Saros 146)	July 1, 2057 (Saros 147)	May 31, 2068 (Saros 148)
May 1, 2079 (Saros 149)	March 31, 2090 (Saros 150)	February 28, 2101 (Saros 151)	January 29, 2112 (Saros 152)	December 28, 2122 (Saros 153)
November 26, 2133 (Saros 154)	October 26, 2144 (Saros 155)	September 26, 2155 (Saros 156)	August 25, 2166 (Saros 157)	July 25, 2177 (Saros 158)
June 24, 2188 (Saros 159)	May 24, 2199 (Saros 160)			

=== Inex series ===
This eclipse is a part of the long period inex cycle, repeating at alternating nodes, every 358 synodic months (≈ 10,571.95 days, or 29 years minus 20 days). Their appearance and longitude are irregular due to a lack of synchronization with the anomalistic month (period of perigee). However, groupings of 3 inex cycles (≈ 87 years minus 2 months) comes close (≈ 1,151.02 anomalistic months), so eclipses are similar in these groupings.

Series members between 1801 and 2200
June 6, 1807 (Saros 134)	May 15, 1836 (Saros 135)	April 25, 1865 (Saros 136)
April 6, 1894 (Saros 137)	March 17, 1923 (Saros 138)	February 25, 1952 (Saros 139)
February 4, 1981 (Saros 140)	January 15, 2010 (Saros 141)	December 26, 2038 (Saros 142)
December 6, 2067 (Saros 143)	November 15, 2096 (Saros 144)	October 26, 2125 (Saros 145)
October 7, 2154 (Saros 146)	September 16, 2183 (Saros 147)	
