= Solar eclipse of April 8, 1959 =

20th-century annular solar eclipse

- Annular eclipse
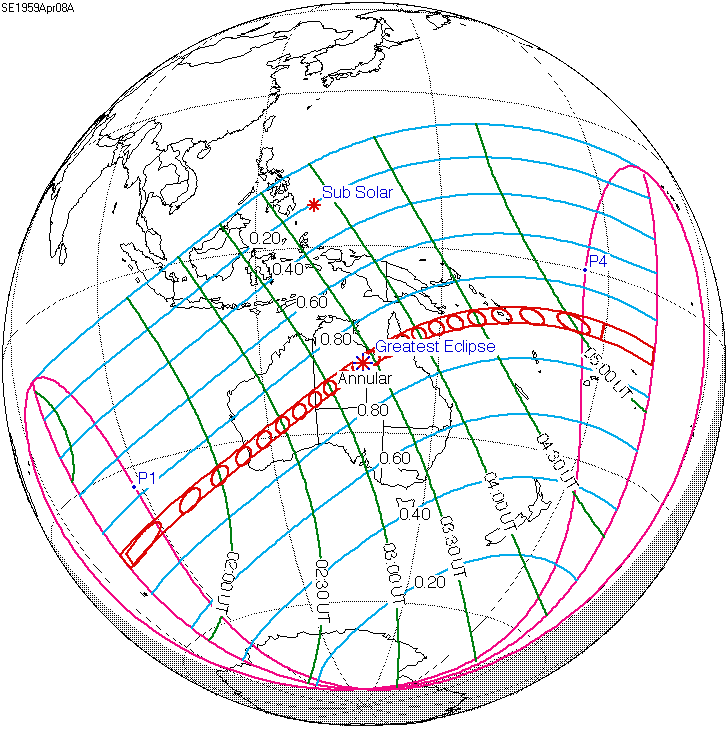
- Map
- Gamma: −0.4546
- Magnitude: 0.9401

Maximum eclipse
- Duration: 446 s (7 min 26 s)
- Coordinates: 19.1°S 137.6°E
- Max. width of band: 247 km (153 mi)

Times (UTC)
- Greatest eclipse: 3:24:08

References
- Saros: 138 (28 of 70)
- Catalog # (SE5000): 9418

An annular solar eclipse occurred at the Moon's descending node of orbit on Wednesday, April 8, 1959, with a magnitude of 0.9401. A solar eclipse occurs when the Moon passes between Earth and the Sun, thereby totally or partly obscuring the image of the Sun for a viewer on Earth. An annular solar eclipse occurs when the Moon's apparent diameter is smaller than the Sun's, blocking most of the Sun's light and causing the Sun to look like an annulus (ring). An annular eclipse appears as a partial eclipse over a region of the Earth thousands of kilometres wide. Occurring about 2.9 days after apogee (on April 10, 1959, at 23:00 UTC), the Moon's apparent diameter was smaller.

Annularity was visible from Australia, southeastern tip of Milne Bay Province in the Territory of Papua New Guinea (today's Papua New Guinea), British Solomon Islands (today's Solomon Islands), Gilbert and Ellice Islands (the part now belonging to Tuvalu), Tokelau, and Swains Island in American Samoa. A partial eclipse was visible for parts of Australia, Antarctica, Southeast Asia, and Oceania.

== Eclipse details ==
Shown below are two tables displaying details about this particular solar eclipse. The first table outlines times at which the Moon's penumbra or umbra attains the specific parameter, and the second table describes various other parameters pertaining to this eclipse.

April 8, 1959 Solar Eclipse Times
Event	Time (UTC)
First Penumbral External Contact	1959 April 8 at 00:27:28.0 UTC
First Umbral External Contact	1959 April 8 at 01:36:33.3 UTC
First Central Line	1959 April 8 at 01:39:23.2 UTC
First Umbral Internal Contact	1959 April 8 at 01:42:14.0 UTC
Equatorial Conjunction	1959 April 8 at 03:08:03.5 UTC
Greatest Eclipse	1959 April 8 at 03:24:08.2 UTC
Ecliptic Conjunction	1959 April 8 at 03:29:32.4 UTC
Greatest Duration	1959 April 8 at 03:30:28.4 UTC
Last Umbral Internal Contact	1959 April 8 at 05:06:13.3 UTC
Last Central Line	1959 April 8 at 05:09:05.4 UTC
Last Umbral External Contact	1959 April 8 at 05:11:56.5 UTC
Last Penumbral External Contact	1959 April 8 at 06:20:59.2 UTC

April 8, 1959 Solar Eclipse Parameters
Parameter	Value
Eclipse Magnitude	0.94012
Eclipse Obscuration	0.88382
Gamma	−0.45463
Sun Right Ascension	01h04m44.7s
Sun Declination	+06°53'31.5"
Sun Semi-Diameter	15'58.4"
Sun Equatorial Horizontal Parallax	08.8"
Moon Right Ascension	01h05m13.2s
Moon Declination	+06°29'54.6"
Moon Semi-Diameter	14'49.0"
Moon Equatorial Horizontal Parallax	0°54'22.5"
ΔT	32.8 s

== Eclipse season ==
This eclipse is part of an eclipse season, a period, roughly every six months, when eclipses occur. Only two (or occasionally three) eclipse seasons occur each year, and each season lasts about 35 days and repeats just short of six months (173 days) later; thus two full eclipse seasons always occur each year. Either two or three eclipses happen each eclipse season. In the sequence below, each eclipse is separated by a fortnight.

Eclipse season of March–April 1959
March 24 Ascending node (full moon)	April 8 Descending node (new moon)
Partial lunar eclipse Lunar Saros 112	Annular solar eclipse Solar Saros 138

== Related eclipses ==
=== Eclipses in 1959 ===
- A partial lunar eclipse on March 24.
- An annular solar eclipse on April 8.
- A penumbral lunar eclipse on September 17.
- A total solar eclipse on October 2.

=== Metonic ===
- Preceded by: Solar eclipse of June 20, 1955
- Followed by: Solar eclipse of January 25, 1963

=== Tzolkinex ===
- Preceded by: Solar eclipse of February 25, 1952
- Followed by: Solar eclipse of May 20, 1966

=== Half-Saros ===
- Preceded by: Lunar eclipse of April 2, 1950
- Followed by: Lunar eclipse of April 13, 1968

=== Tritos ===
- Preceded by: Solar eclipse of May 9, 1948
- Followed by: Solar eclipse of March 7, 1970

=== Solar Saros 138 ===
- Preceded by: Solar eclipse of March 27, 1941
- Followed by: Solar eclipse of April 18, 1977

=== Inex ===
- Preceded by: Solar eclipse of April 28, 1930
- Followed by: Solar eclipse of March 18, 1988

=== Triad ===
- Preceded by: Solar eclipse of June 6, 1872
- Followed by: Solar eclipse of February 5, 2046

=== Solar eclipses of 1957–1960 ===
This eclipse is a member of a semester series. An eclipse in a semester series of solar eclipses repeats approximately every 177 days and 4 hours (a semester) at alternating nodes of the Moon's orbit.

Solar eclipse series sets from 1957 to 1960
Descending node			Ascending node		
Saros	Map	Gamma	Saros	Map	Gamma
118	April 30, 1957 Annular (non-central)	0.9992	123	October 23, 1957 Total (non-central)	1.0022
128	April 19, 1958 Annular	0.275	133	October 12, 1958 Total	−0.2951
138	April 8, 1959 Annular	−0.4546	143	October 2, 1959 Total	0.4207
148	March 27, 1960 Partial	−1.1537	153	September 20, 1960 Partial	1.2057

=== Saros 138 ===
This eclipse is a part of Saros series 138, repeating every 18 years, 11 days, and containing 70 events. The series started with a partial solar eclipse on June 6, 1472. It contains annular eclipses from August 31, 1598 through February 18, 2482; a hybrid eclipse on March 1, 2500; and total eclipses from March 12, 2518 through April 3, 2554. The series ends at member 70 as a partial eclipse on July 11, 2716. Its eclipses are tabulated in three columns; every third eclipse in the same column is one exeligmos apart, so they all cast shadows over approximately the same parts of the Earth.

The longest duration of annularity was produced by member 23 at 8 minutes, 2 seconds on February 11, 1869, and the longest duration of totality will be produced by member 61 at 56 seconds on April 3, 2554. All eclipses in this series occur at the Moon’s descending node of orbit.

Series members 20–41 occur between 1801 and 2200:
20	21	22
January 10, 1815	January 20, 1833	February 1, 1851
23	24	25
February 11, 1869	February 22, 1887	March 6, 1905
26	27	28
March 17, 1923	March 27, 1941	April 8, 1959
29	30	31
April 18, 1977	April 29, 1995	May 10, 2013
32	33	34
May 21, 2031	May 31, 2049	June 11, 2067
35	36	37
June 22, 2085	July 4, 2103	July 14, 2121
38	39	40
July 25, 2139	August 5, 2157	August 16, 2175
41
August 26, 2193

=== Metonic series ===
The metonic series repeats eclipses every 19 years (6939.69 days), lasting about 5 cycles. Eclipses occur in nearly the same calendar date. In addition, the octon subseries repeats 1/5 of that or every 3.8 years (1387.94 days). All eclipses in this table occur at the Moon's descending node.

22 eclipse events between April 8, 1902 and August 31, 1989
April 7–8	January 24–25	November 12	August 31–September 1	June 19–20
108	110	112	114	116
April 8, 1902			August 31, 1913	June 19, 1917
118	120	122	124	126
April 8, 1921	January 24, 1925	November 12, 1928	August 31, 1932	June 19, 1936
128	130	132	134	136
April 7, 1940	January 25, 1944	November 12, 1947	September 1, 1951	June 20, 1955
138	140	142	144	146
April 8, 1959	January 25, 1963	November 12, 1966	August 31, 1970	June 20, 1974
148	150	152	154	
April 7, 1978	January 25, 1982	November 12, 1985	August 31, 1989	

=== Tritos series ===
This eclipse is a part of a tritos cycle, repeating at alternating nodes every 135 synodic months (≈ 3986.63 days, or 11 years minus 1 month). Their appearance and longitude are irregular due to a lack of synchronization with the anomalistic month (period of perigee), but groupings of 3 tritos cycles (≈ 33 years minus 3 months) come close (≈ 434.044 anomalistic months), so eclipses are similar in these groupings.

Series members between 1801 and 2200
June 16, 1806 (Saros 124)	May 16, 1817 (Saros 125)	April 14, 1828 (Saros 126)	March 15, 1839 (Saros 127)	February 12, 1850 (Saros 128)
January 11, 1861 (Saros 129)	December 12, 1871 (Saros 130)	November 10, 1882 (Saros 131)	October 9, 1893 (Saros 132)	September 9, 1904 (Saros 133)
August 10, 1915 (Saros 134)	July 9, 1926 (Saros 135)	June 8, 1937 (Saros 136)	May 9, 1948 (Saros 137)	April 8, 1959 (Saros 138)
March 7, 1970 (Saros 139)	February 4, 1981 (Saros 140)	January 4, 1992 (Saros 141)	December 4, 2002 (Saros 142)	November 3, 2013 (Saros 143)
October 2, 2024 (Saros 144)	September 2, 2035 (Saros 145)	August 2, 2046 (Saros 146)	July 1, 2057 (Saros 147)	May 31, 2068 (Saros 148)
May 1, 2079 (Saros 149)	March 31, 2090 (Saros 150)	February 28, 2101 (Saros 151)	January 29, 2112 (Saros 152)	December 28, 2122 (Saros 153)
November 26, 2133 (Saros 154)	October 26, 2144 (Saros 155)	September 26, 2155 (Saros 156)	August 25, 2166 (Saros 157)	July 25, 2177 (Saros 158)
June 24, 2188 (Saros 159)	May 24, 2199 (Saros 160)			

=== Inex series ===
This eclipse is a part of the long period inex cycle, repeating at alternating nodes, every 358 synodic months (≈ 10,571.95 days, or 29 years minus 20 days). Their appearance and longitude are irregular due to a lack of synchronization with the anomalistic month (period of perigee). However, groupings of 3 inex cycles (≈ 87 years minus 2 months) comes close (≈ 1,151.02 anomalistic months), so eclipses are similar in these groupings.

Series members between 1801 and 2200
July 17, 1814 (Saros 133)	June 27, 1843 (Saros 134)	June 6, 1872 (Saros 135)
May 18, 1901 (Saros 136)	April 28, 1930 (Saros 137)	April 8, 1959 (Saros 138)
March 18, 1988 (Saros 139)	February 26, 2017 (Saros 140)	February 5, 2046 (Saros 141)
January 16, 2075 (Saros 142)	December 29, 2103 (Saros 143)	December 7, 2132 (Saros 144)
November 17, 2161 (Saros 145)	October 29, 2190 (Saros 146)	
