= Solar eclipse of January 25, 1963 =

20th-century annular solar eclipse

- Annular eclipse
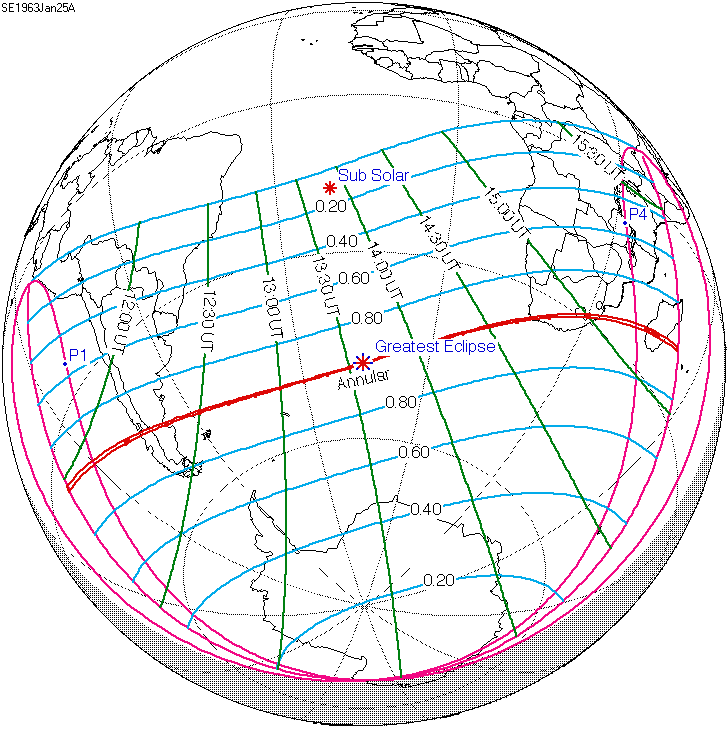
- Map
- Gamma: −0.4898
- Magnitude: 0.9951

Maximum eclipse
- Duration: 25 s (0 min 25 s)
- Coordinates: 48.2°S 15°W
- Max. width of band: 20 km (12 mi)

Times (UTC)
- Greatest eclipse: 13:37:12

References
- Saros: 140 (26 of 71)
- Catalog # (SE5000): 9426

An annular solar eclipse occurred at the Moon's descending node of orbit on Friday, January 25, 1963, with a magnitude of 0.9951. A solar eclipse occurs when the Moon passes between Earth and the Sun, thereby totally or partly obscuring the image of the Sun for a viewer on Earth. An annular solar eclipse occurs when the Moon's apparent diameter is smaller than the Sun's, blocking most of the Sun's light and causing the Sun to look like an annulus (ring). An annular eclipse appears as a partial eclipse over a region of the Earth thousands of kilometres wide. The Moon's apparent diameter was near the average diameter because it occurred 8.2 days after apogee (on January 17, 1963, at 8:00 UTC) and 3.7 days before perigee (on January 29, 1963, at 7:20 UTC).

The moon's apparent diameter was 4.8 arcseconds larger than the July 20, 1963 total solar eclipse. This was an annular solar eclipse because it occurred in January and the earth is near its perihelion (closest approach to the Sun) in January.

The path of annularity crossed Chile, Argentina, South Africa, southern Basutoland (today's Lesotho) and Malagasy Republic (today's Madagascar). A partial eclipse was visible for parts of southern and central South America, Antarctica, Southern Africa, and Eastern Africa.

== Eclipse details ==
Shown below are two tables displaying details about this particular solar eclipse. The first table outlines times at which the Moon's penumbra or umbra attains the specific parameter, and the second table describes various other parameters pertaining to this eclipse.

January 25, 1963 Solar Eclipse Times
Event	Time (UTC)
First Penumbral External Contact	1963 January 25 at 10:57:14.2 UTC
First Umbral External Contact	1963 January 25 at 12:01:54.0 UTC
First Central Line	1963 January 25 at 12:02:36.0 UTC
Greatest Duration	1963 January 25 at 12:02:36.0 UTC
First Umbral Internal Contact	1963 January 25 at 12:03:18.1 UTC
Equatorial Conjunction	1963 January 25 at 13:29:27.8 UTC
Greatest Eclipse	1963 January 25 at 13:37:11.7 UTC
Ecliptic Conjunction	1963 January 25 at 13:42:27.8 UTC
Last Umbral Internal Contact	1963 January 25 at 15:11:13.0 UTC
Last Central Line	1963 January 25 at 15:11:52.2 UTC
Last Umbral External Contact	1963 January 25 at 15:12:31.4 UTC
Last Penumbral External Contact	1963 January 25 at 16:17:06.6 UTC

January 25, 1963 Solar Eclipse Parameters
Parameter	Value
Eclipse Magnitude	0.99511
Eclipse Obscuration	0.99025
Gamma	−0.48984
Sun Right Ascension	20h28m50.7s
Sun Declination	-19°03'07.2"
Sun Semi-Diameter	16'14.7"
Sun Equatorial Horizontal Parallax	08.9"
Moon Right Ascension	20h29m08.2s
Moon Declination	-19°31'24.1"
Moon Semi-Diameter	15'56.3"
Moon Equatorial Horizontal Parallax	0°58'29.7"
ΔT	34.5 s

== Eclipse season ==
This eclipse is part of an eclipse season, a period, roughly every six months, when eclipses occur. Only two (or occasionally three) eclipse seasons occur each year, and each season lasts about 35 days and repeats just short of six months (173 days) later; thus two full eclipse seasons always occur each year. Either two or three eclipses happen each eclipse season. In the sequence below, each eclipse is separated by a fortnight.

Eclipse season of January 1963
January 9 Ascending node (full moon)	January 25 Descending node (new moon)
Penumbral lunar eclipse Lunar Saros 114	Annular solar eclipse Solar Saros 140

== Related eclipses ==
=== Eclipses in 1963 ===
- A penumbral lunar eclipse on January 9.
- An annular solar eclipse on January 25.
- A partial lunar eclipse on July 6.
- A total solar eclipse on July 20.
- A total lunar eclipse on December 30.

=== Metonic ===
- Preceded by: Solar eclipse of April 8, 1959
- Followed by: Solar eclipse of November 12, 1966

=== Tzolkinex ===
- Preceded by: Solar eclipse of December 14, 1955
- Followed by: Solar eclipse of March 7, 1970

=== Half-Saros ===
- Preceded by: Lunar eclipse of January 19, 1954
- Followed by: Lunar eclipse of January 30, 1972

=== Tritos ===
- Preceded by: Solar eclipse of February 25, 1952
- Followed by: Solar eclipse of December 24, 1973

=== Solar Saros 140 ===
- Preceded by: Solar eclipse of January 14, 1945
- Followed by: Solar eclipse of February 4, 1981

=== Inex ===
- Preceded by: Solar eclipse of February 14, 1934
- Followed by: Solar eclipse of January 4, 1992

=== Triad ===
- Preceded by: Solar eclipse of March 25, 1876
- Followed by: Solar eclipse of November 25, 2049

=== Solar eclipses of 1961–1964 ===
This eclipse is a member of a semester series. An eclipse in a semester series of solar eclipses repeats approximately every 177 days and 4 hours (a semester) at alternating nodes of the Moon's orbit.

The partial solar eclipses on June 10, 1964 and December 4, 1964 occur in the next lunar year eclipse set.

Solar eclipse series sets from 1961 to 1964
Descending node			Ascending node		
Saros	Map	Gamma	Saros	Map	Gamma
120	February 15, 1961 Total	0.883	125	August 11, 1961 Annular	−0.8859
130	February 5, 1962 Total	0.2107	135	July 31, 1962 Annular	−0.113
140	January 25, 1963 Annular	−0.4898	145	July 20, 1963 Total	0.6571
150	January 14, 1964 Partial	−1.2354	155	July 9, 1964 Partial	1.3623

=== Saros 140 ===
This eclipse is a part of Saros series 140, repeating every 18 years, 11 days, and containing 71 events. The series started with a partial solar eclipse on April 16, 1512. It contains total eclipses from July 21, 1656 through November 9, 1836; hybrid eclipses from November 20, 1854 through December 23, 1908; and annular eclipses from January 3, 1927 through December 7, 2485. The series ends at member 71 as a partial eclipse on June 1, 2774. Its eclipses are tabulated in three columns; every third eclipse in the same column is one exeligmos apart, so they all cast shadows over approximately the same parts of the Earth.

The longest duration of totality was produced by member 11 at 4 minutes, 10 seconds on August 12, 1692, and the longest duration of annularity will be produced by member 53 at 7 minutes, 35 seconds on November 15, 2449. All eclipses in this series occur at the Moon’s descending node of orbit.

Series members 18–39 occur between 1801 and 2200:
18	19	20
October 29, 1818	November 9, 1836	November 20, 1854
21	22	23
November 30, 1872	December 12, 1890	December 23, 1908
24	25	26
January 3, 1927	January 14, 1945	January 25, 1963
27	28	29
February 4, 1981	February 16, 1999	February 26, 2017
30	31	32
March 9, 2035	March 20, 2053	March 31, 2071
33	34	35
April 10, 2089	April 23, 2107	May 3, 2125
36	37	38
May 14, 2143	May 25, 2161	June 5, 2179
39
June 15, 2197

=== Metonic series ===
The metonic series repeats eclipses every 19 years (6939.69 days), lasting about 5 cycles. Eclipses occur in nearly the same calendar date. In addition, the octon subseries repeats 1/5 of that or every 3.8 years (1387.94 days). All eclipses in this table occur at the Moon's descending node.

22 eclipse events between April 8, 1902 and August 31, 1989
April 7–8	January 24–25	November 12	August 31–September 1	June 19–20
108	110	112	114	116
April 8, 1902			August 31, 1913	June 19, 1917
118	120	122	124	126
April 8, 1921	January 24, 1925	November 12, 1928	August 31, 1932	June 19, 1936
128	130	132	134	136
April 7, 1940	January 25, 1944	November 12, 1947	September 1, 1951	June 20, 1955
138	140	142	144	146
April 8, 1959	January 25, 1963	November 12, 1966	August 31, 1970	June 20, 1974
148	150	152	154	
April 7, 1978	January 25, 1982	November 12, 1985	August 31, 1989	

=== Tritos series ===
This eclipse is a part of a tritos cycle, repeating at alternating nodes every 135 synodic months (≈ 3986.63 days, or 11 years minus 1 month). Their appearance and longitude are irregular due to a lack of synchronization with the anomalistic month (period of perigee), but groupings of 3 tritos cycles (≈ 33 years minus 3 months) come close (≈ 434.044 anomalistic months), so eclipses are similar in these groupings.

Series members between 1801 and 2200
April 4, 1810 (Saros 126)	March 4, 1821 (Saros 127)	February 1, 1832 (Saros 128)	December 31, 1842 (Saros 129)	November 30, 1853 (Saros 130)
October 30, 1864 (Saros 131)	September 29, 1875 (Saros 132)	August 29, 1886 (Saros 133)	July 29, 1897 (Saros 134)	June 28, 1908 (Saros 135)
May 29, 1919 (Saros 136)	April 28, 1930 (Saros 137)	March 27, 1941 (Saros 138)	February 25, 1952 (Saros 139)	January 25, 1963 (Saros 140)
December 24, 1973 (Saros 141)	November 22, 1984 (Saros 142)	October 24, 1995 (Saros 143)	September 22, 2006 (Saros 144)	August 21, 2017 (Saros 145)
July 22, 2028 (Saros 146)	June 21, 2039 (Saros 147)	May 20, 2050 (Saros 148)	April 20, 2061 (Saros 149)	March 19, 2072 (Saros 150)
February 16, 2083 (Saros 151)	January 16, 2094 (Saros 152)	December 17, 2104 (Saros 153)	November 16, 2115 (Saros 154)	October 16, 2126 (Saros 155)
September 15, 2137 (Saros 156)	August 14, 2148 (Saros 157)	July 15, 2159 (Saros 158)	June 14, 2170 (Saros 159)	May 13, 2181 (Saros 160)
April 12, 2192 (Saros 161)

=== Inex series ===
This eclipse is a part of the long period inex cycle, repeating at alternating nodes, every 358 synodic months (≈ 10,571.95 days, or 29 years minus 20 days). Their appearance and longitude are irregular due to a lack of synchronization with the anomalistic month (period of perigee). However, groupings of 3 inex cycles (≈ 87 years minus 2 months) comes close (≈ 1,151.02 anomalistic months), so eclipses are similar in these groupings.

Series members between 1801 and 2200
May 5, 1818 (Saros 135)	April 15, 1847 (Saros 136)	March 25, 1876 (Saros 137)
March 6, 1905 (Saros 138)	February 14, 1934 (Saros 139)	January 25, 1963 (Saros 140)
January 4, 1992 (Saros 141)	December 14, 2020 (Saros 142)	November 25, 2049 (Saros 143)
November 4, 2078 (Saros 144)	October 16, 2107 (Saros 145)	September 26, 2136 (Saros 146)
September 5, 2165 (Saros 147)	August 16, 2194 (Saros 148)	
