= Solar eclipse of March 27, 1941 =

20th-century annular solar eclipse

- Annular eclipse
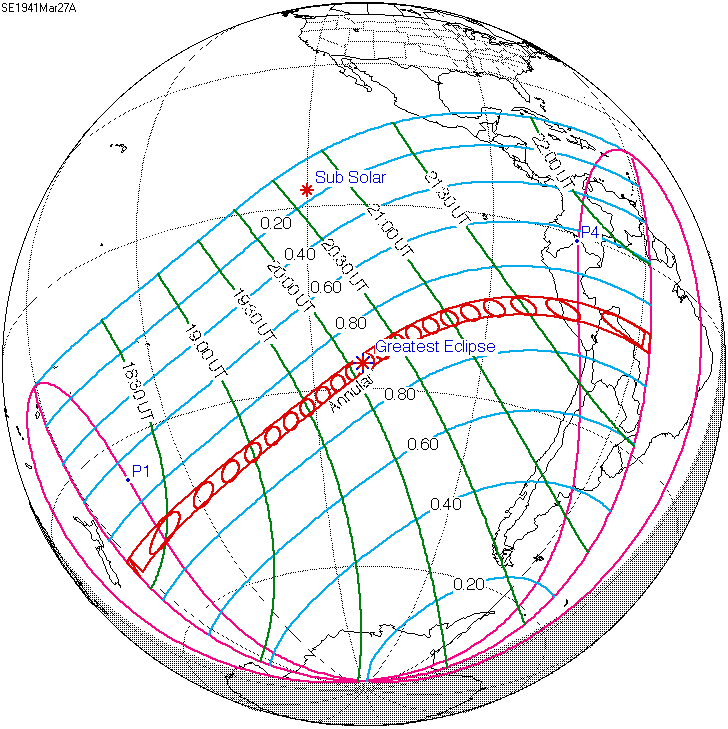
- Map
- Gamma: −0.5025
- Magnitude: 0.9355

Maximum eclipse
- Duration: 461 s (7 min 41 s)
- Coordinates: 26.2°S 110.9°W
- Max. width of band: 276 km (171 mi)

Times (UTC)
- Greatest eclipse: 20:08:08

References
- Saros: 138 (27 of 70)
- Catalog # (SE5000): 9377

An annular solar eclipse occurred at the Moon's descending node of orbit on Thursday, March 27, 1941, with a magnitude of 0.9355. A solar eclipse occurs when the Moon passes between Earth and the Sun, thereby totally or partly obscuring the image of the Sun for a viewer on Earth. An annular solar eclipse occurs when the Moon's apparent diameter is smaller than the Sun's, blocking most of the Sun's light and causing the Sun to look like an annulus (ring). An annular eclipse appears as a partial eclipse over a region of the Earth thousands of kilometres wide. Occurring about 2.6 days before apogee (on March 30, 1941, at 10:50 UTC), the Moon's apparent diameter was smaller.

Annularity was visible from Peru, Bolivia and Brazil. A partial eclipse was visible for parts of Oceania, Central America, the Caribbean, western South America, and Antarctica.

== Eclipse details ==
Shown below are two tables displaying details about this particular solar eclipse. The first table outlines times at which the Moon's penumbra or umbra attains the specific parameter, and the second table describes various other parameters pertaining to this eclipse.

March 27, 1941 Solar Eclipse Times
Event	Time (UTC)
First Penumbral External Contact	1941 March 27 at 17:12:43.8 UTC
First Umbral External Contact	1941 March 27 at 18:23:09.9 UTC
First Central Line	1941 March 27 at 18:26:16.2 UTC
First Umbral Internal Contact	1941 March 27 at 18:29:24.0 UTC
Equatorial Conjunction	1941 March 27 at 19:49:22.3 UTC
Greatest Eclipse	1941 March 27 at 20:08:07.8 UTC
Greatest Duration	1941 March 27 at 20:11:10.7 UTC
Ecliptic Conjunction	1941 March 27 at 20:14:07.0 UTC
Last Umbral Internal Contact	1941 March 27 at 21:47:04.6 UTC
Last Central Line	1941 March 27 at 21:50:13.5 UTC
Last Umbral External Contact	1941 March 27 at 21:53:20.9 UTC
Last Penumbral External Contact	1941 March 27 at 23:03:43.6 UTC

March 27, 1941 Solar Eclipse Parameters
Parameter	Value
Eclipse Magnitude	0.93546
Eclipse Obscuration	0.87508
Gamma	−0.50251
Sun Right Ascension	00h24m50.5s
Sun Declination	+02°41'09.8"
Sun Semi-Diameter	16'01.3"
Sun Equatorial Horizontal Parallax	08.8"
Moon Right Ascension	00h25m23.4s
Moon Declination	+02°15'13.1"
Moon Semi-Diameter	14'47.6"
Moon Equatorial Horizontal Parallax	0°54'17.7"
ΔT	24.9 s

== Eclipse season ==
This eclipse is part of an eclipse season, a period, roughly every six months, when eclipses occur. Only two (or occasionally three) eclipse seasons occur each year, and each season lasts about 35 days and repeats just short of six months (173 days) later; thus two full eclipse seasons always occur each year. Either two or three eclipses happen each eclipse season. In the sequence below, each eclipse is separated by a fortnight.

Eclipse season of March 1941
March 13 Ascending node (full moon)	March 27 Descending node (new moon)
Partial lunar eclipse Lunar Saros 112	Annular solar eclipse Solar Saros 138

== Related eclipses ==
=== Eclipses in 1941 ===
- A partial lunar eclipse on March 13.
- An annular solar eclipse on March 27.
- A partial lunar eclipse on September 5.
- A total solar eclipse on September 21.

=== Metonic ===
- Preceded by: Solar eclipse of June 8, 1937
- Followed by: Solar eclipse of January 14, 1945

=== Tzolkinex ===
- Preceded by: Solar eclipse of February 14, 1934
- Followed by: Solar eclipse of May 9, 1948

=== Half-Saros ===
- Preceded by: Lunar eclipse of March 22, 1932
- Followed by: Lunar eclipse of April 2, 1950

=== Tritos ===
- Preceded by: Solar eclipse of April 28, 1930
- Followed by: Solar eclipse of February 25, 1952

=== Solar Saros 138 ===
- Preceded by: Solar eclipse of March 17, 1923
- Followed by: Solar eclipse of April 8, 1959

=== Inex ===
- Preceded by: Solar eclipse of April 17, 1912
- Followed by: Solar eclipse of March 7, 1970

=== Triad ===
- Preceded by: Solar eclipse of May 26, 1854
- Followed by: Solar eclipse of January 26, 2028

=== Solar eclipses of 1939–1942 ===
This eclipse is a member of a semester series. An eclipse in a semester series of solar eclipses repeats approximately every 177 days and 4 hours (a semester) at alternating nodes of the Moon's orbit.

The partial solar eclipse on August 12, 1942 occurs in the next lunar year eclipse set.

Solar eclipse series sets from 1939 to 1942
Descending node			Ascending node		
Saros	Map	Gamma	Saros	Map	Gamma
118	April 19, 1939 Annular	0.9388	123	October 12, 1939 Total	−0.9737
128	April 7, 1940 Annular	0.219	133	October 1, 1940 Total	−0.2573
138	March 27, 1941 Annular	−0.5025	143	September 21, 1941 Total	0.4649
148	March 16, 1942 Partial	−1.1908	153	September 10, 1942 Partial	1.2571

=== Saros 138 ===
This eclipse is a part of Saros series 138, repeating every 18 years, 11 days, and containing 70 events. The series started with a partial solar eclipse on June 6, 1472. It contains annular eclipses from August 31, 1598 through February 18, 2482; a hybrid eclipse on March 1, 2500; and total eclipses from March 12, 2518 through April 3, 2554. The series ends at member 70 as a partial eclipse on July 11, 2716. Its eclipses are tabulated in three columns; every third eclipse in the same column is one exeligmos apart, so they all cast shadows over approximately the same parts of the Earth.

The longest duration of annularity was produced by member 23 at 8 minutes, 2 seconds on February 11, 1869, and the longest duration of totality will be produced by member 61 at 56 seconds on April 3, 2554. All eclipses in this series occur at the Moon’s descending node of orbit.

Series members 20–41 occur between 1801 and 2200:
20	21	22
January 10, 1815	January 20, 1833	February 1, 1851
23	24	25
February 11, 1869	February 22, 1887	March 6, 1905
26	27	28
March 17, 1923	March 27, 1941	April 8, 1959
29	30	31
April 18, 1977	April 29, 1995	May 10, 2013
32	33	34
May 21, 2031	May 31, 2049	June 11, 2067
35	36	37
June 22, 2085	July 4, 2103	July 14, 2121
38	39	40
July 25, 2139	August 5, 2157	August 16, 2175
41
August 26, 2193

=== Metonic series ===
The metonic series repeats eclipses every 19 years (6939.69 days), lasting about 5 cycles. Eclipses occur in nearly the same calendar date. In addition, the octon subseries repeats 1/5 of that or every 3.8 years (1387.94 days). All eclipses in this table occur at the Moon's descending node.

22 eclipse events between March 27, 1884 and August 20, 1971
March 27–29	January 14	November 1–2	August 20–21	June 8
108	110	112	114	116
March 27, 1884			August 20, 1895	June 8, 1899
118	120	122	124	126
March 29, 1903	January 14, 1907	November 2, 1910	August 21, 1914	June 8, 1918
128	130	132	134	136
March 28, 1922	January 14, 1926	November 1, 1929	August 21, 1933	June 8, 1937
138	140	142	144	146
March 27, 1941	January 14, 1945	November 1, 1948	August 20, 1952	June 8, 1956
148	150	152	154	
March 27, 1960	January 14, 1964	November 2, 1967	August 20, 1971	

=== Tritos series ===
This eclipse is a part of a tritos cycle, repeating at alternating nodes every 135 synodic months (≈ 3986.63 days, or 11 years minus 1 month). Their appearance and longitude are irregular due to a lack of synchronization with the anomalistic month (period of perigee), but groupings of 3 tritos cycles (≈ 33 years minus 3 months) come close (≈ 434.044 anomalistic months), so eclipses are similar in these groupings.

Series members between 1801 and 2200
April 4, 1810 (Saros 126)	March 4, 1821 (Saros 127)	February 1, 1832 (Saros 128)	December 31, 1842 (Saros 129)	November 30, 1853 (Saros 130)
October 30, 1864 (Saros 131)	September 29, 1875 (Saros 132)	August 29, 1886 (Saros 133)	July 29, 1897 (Saros 134)	June 28, 1908 (Saros 135)
May 29, 1919 (Saros 136)	April 28, 1930 (Saros 137)	March 27, 1941 (Saros 138)	February 25, 1952 (Saros 139)	January 25, 1963 (Saros 140)
December 24, 1973 (Saros 141)	November 22, 1984 (Saros 142)	October 24, 1995 (Saros 143)	September 22, 2006 (Saros 144)	August 21, 2017 (Saros 145)
July 22, 2028 (Saros 146)	June 21, 2039 (Saros 147)	May 20, 2050 (Saros 148)	April 20, 2061 (Saros 149)	March 19, 2072 (Saros 150)
February 16, 2083 (Saros 151)	January 16, 2094 (Saros 152)	December 17, 2104 (Saros 153)	November 16, 2115 (Saros 154)	October 16, 2126 (Saros 155)
September 15, 2137 (Saros 156)	August 14, 2148 (Saros 157)	July 15, 2159 (Saros 158)	June 14, 2170 (Saros 159)	May 13, 2181 (Saros 160)
April 12, 2192 (Saros 161)

=== Inex series ===
This eclipse is a part of the long period inex cycle, repeating at alternating nodes, every 358 synodic months (≈ 10,571.95 days, or 29 years minus 20 days). Their appearance and longitude are irregular due to a lack of synchronization with the anomalistic month (period of perigee). However, groupings of 3 inex cycles (≈ 87 years minus 2 months) comes close (≈ 1,151.02 anomalistic months), so eclipses are similar in these groupings.

Series members between 1801 and 2200
June 16, 1825 (Saros 134)	May 26, 1854 (Saros 135)	May 6, 1883 (Saros 136)
April 17, 1912 (Saros 137)	March 27, 1941 (Saros 138)	March 7, 1970 (Saros 139)
February 16, 1999 (Saros 140)	January 26, 2028 (Saros 141)	January 5, 2057 (Saros 142)
December 16, 2085 (Saros 143)	November 27, 2114 (Saros 144)	November 7, 2143 (Saros 145)
October 17, 2172 (Saros 146)		
