= Solar eclipse of June 22, 2085 =

Future annular solar eclipse

- Annular eclipse
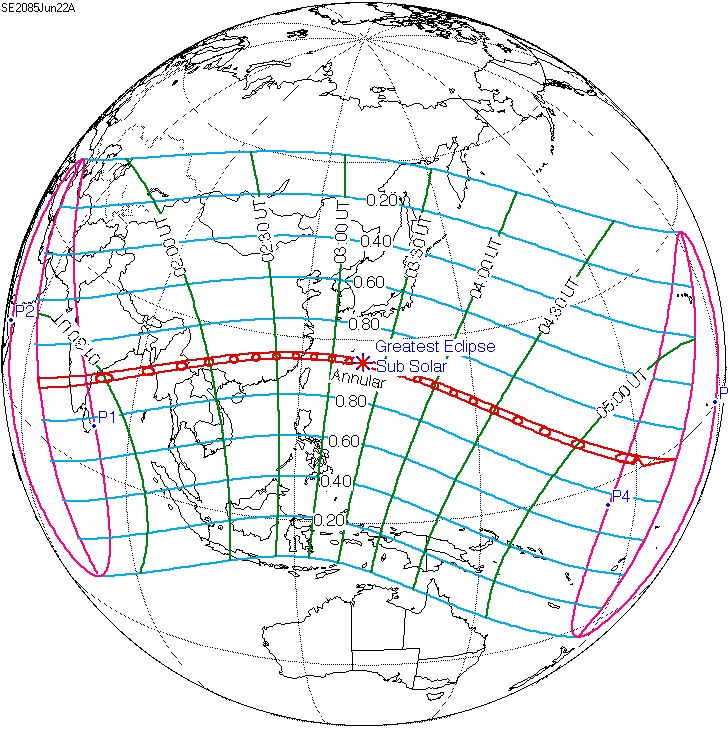
- Map
- Gamma: 0.0452
- Magnitude: 0.9704

Maximum eclipse
- Duration: 209 s (3 min 29 s)
- Coordinates: 26.2°N 131.3°E
- Max. width of band: 106 km (66 mi)

Times (UTC)
- Greatest eclipse: 3:21:16

References
- Saros: 138 (35 of 70)
- Catalog # (SE5000): 9699

An annular solar eclipse will occur at the Moon's descending node of orbit on Friday, June 22, 2085, with a magnitude of 0.9704. A solar eclipse occurs when the Moon passes between Earth and the Sun, thereby totally or partly obscuring the image of the Sun for a viewer on Earth. An annular solar eclipse occurs when the Moon's apparent diameter is smaller than the Sun's, blocking most of the Sun's light and causing the Sun to look like an annulus (ring). An annular eclipse appears as a partial eclipse over a region of the Earth thousands of kilometres wide. Occurring about 4.6 days before apogee (on June 26, 2085, at 16:30 UTC), the Moon's apparent diameter will be smaller.

The path of annularity will be visible from parts of India, Myanmar, China, the Ryukyu Islands (including Okinawa), the Marshall Islands, and Kiribati. A partial solar eclipse will also be visible for parts of South Asia, Southeast Asia, East Asia, Oceania, and Hawaii.

== Eclipse details ==
Shown below are two tables displaying details about this particular solar eclipse. The first table outlines times at which the Moon's penumbra or umbra attains the specific parameter, and the second table describes various other parameters pertaining to this eclipse.

June 22, 2085 solar eclipse times
Event	Time (UTC)
First penumbral external contact	2085 June 22 at 00:21:14.2 UTC
First umbral external contact	2085 June 22 at 01:24:22.9 UTC
First central line	2085 June 22 at 01:25:50.9 UTC
First umbral internal contact	2085 June 22 at 01:27:19.0 UTC
First penumbral internal contact	2085 June 22 at 02:30:35.9 UTC
Greatest duration	2085 June 22 at 03:17:43.0 UTC
Equatorial conjunction	2085 June 22 at 03:20:41.0 UTC
Ecliptic conjunction	2085 June 22 at 03:20:44.5 UTC
Greatest eclipse	2085 June 22 at 03:21:15.9 UTC
Last penumbral internal contact	2085 June 22 at 04:11:55.8 UTC
Last umbral internal contact	2085 June 22 at 05:15:11.5 UTC
Last central line	2085 June 22 at 05:16:42.0 UTC
Last umbral external contact	2085 June 22 at 05:18:12.5 UTC
Last penumbral external contact	2085 June 22 at 06:21:23.2 UTC

June 22, 2085 solar eclipse parameters
Parameter	Value
Eclipse magnitude	0.97041
Eclipse obscuration	0.94170
Gamma	0.04525
Sun right ascension	06h06m22.6s
Sun declination	+23°25'12.0"
Sun semi-diameter	15'44.3"
Sun equatorial horizontal parallax	08.7"
Moon right ascension	06h06m23.8s
Moon declination	+23°27'40.5"
Moon semi-diameter	15'02.4"
Moon equatorial horizontal parallax	0°55'11.8"
ΔT	110.1 s

== Eclipse season ==
This eclipse is part of an eclipse season, a period, roughly every six months, when eclipses occur. Only two (or occasionally three) eclipse seasons occur each year, and each season lasts about 35 days and repeats just short of six months (173 days) later; thus two full eclipse seasons always occur each year. Either two or three eclipses happen each eclipse season. In the sequence below, each eclipse is separated by a fortnight. The first and last eclipse in this sequence is separated by one synodic month.

Eclipse season of June–July 2085
June 8 Ascending node (full moon)	June 22 Descending node (new moon)	July 7 Ascending node (full moon)
Penumbral lunar eclipse Lunar Saros 112	Annular solar eclipse Solar Saros 138	Penumbral lunar eclipse Lunar Saros 150

== Related eclipses ==
=== Eclipses in 2085 ===
- A penumbral lunar eclipse on January 10
- A penumbral lunar eclipse on June 8
- An annular solar eclipse on June 22
- A penumbral lunar eclipse on July 7
- A penumbral lunar eclipse on December 1
- An annular solar eclipse on December 16

=== Metonic ===
- Preceded by: Solar eclipse of September 3, 2081
- Followed by: Solar eclipse of April 10, 2089

=== Tzolkinex ===
- Preceded by: Solar eclipse of May 11, 2078
- Followed by: Solar eclipse of August 3, 2092

=== Half-Saros ===
- Preceded by: Lunar eclipse of June 17, 2076
- Followed by: Lunar eclipse of June 28, 2094

=== Tritos ===
- Preceded by: Solar eclipse of July 24, 2074
- Followed by: Solar eclipse of May 22, 2096

=== Solar Saros 138 ===
- Preceded by: Solar eclipse of June 11, 2067
- Followed by: Solar eclipse of July 4, 2103

=== Inex ===
- Preceded by: Solar eclipse of July 12, 2056
- Followed by: Solar eclipse of June 3, 2114

=== Triad ===
- Preceded by: Solar eclipse of August 22, 1998
- Followed by: Solar eclipse of April 23, 2172

=== Solar eclipses of 2083–2087 ===
This eclipse is a member of a semester series. An eclipse in a semester series of solar eclipses repeats approximately every 177 days and 4 hours (a semester) at alternating nodes of the Moon's orbit.

The partial solar eclipses on February 16, 2083 and August 13, 2083 occur in the previous lunar year eclipse set, and the partial solar eclipses on May 2, 2087 and October 26, 2087 occur in the next lunar year eclipse set.

Solar eclipse series sets from 2083 to 2087
Descending node			Ascending node		
Saros	Map	Gamma	Saros	Map	Gamma
118	July 15, 2083 Partial	1.5465	123	January 7, 2084 Partial	−1.0715
128	July 3, 2084 Annular	0.8208	133	December 27, 2084 Total	−0.4094
138	June 22, 2085 Annular	0.0452	143	December 16, 2085 Annular	0.2786
148	June 11, 2086 Total	−0.7215	153	December 6, 2086 Partial	1.0194
158	June 1, 2087 Partial	−1.4186			

=== Saros 138 ===
This eclipse is a part of Saros series 138, repeating every 18 years, 11 days, and containing 70 events. The series started with a partial solar eclipse on June 6, 1472. It contains annular eclipses from August 31, 1598 through February 18, 2482; a hybrid eclipse on March 1, 2500; and total eclipses from March 12, 2518 through April 3, 2554. The series ends at member 70 as a partial eclipse on July 11, 2716. Its eclipses are tabulated in three columns; every third eclipse in the same column is one exeligmos apart, so they all cast shadows over approximately the same parts of the Earth.

The longest duration of annularity was produced by member 23 at 8 minutes, 2 seconds on February 11, 1869, and the longest duration of totality will be produced by member 61 at 56 seconds on April 3, 2554. All eclipses in this series occur at the Moon’s descending node of orbit.

Series members 20–41 occur between 1801 and 2200:
20	21	22
January 10, 1815	January 20, 1833	February 1, 1851
23	24	25
February 11, 1869	February 22, 1887	March 6, 1905
26	27	28
March 17, 1923	March 27, 1941	April 8, 1959
29	30	31
April 18, 1977	April 29, 1995	May 10, 2013
32	33	34
May 21, 2031	May 31, 2049	June 11, 2067
35	36	37
June 22, 2085	July 4, 2103	July 14, 2121
38	39	40
July 25, 2139	August 5, 2157	August 16, 2175
41
August 26, 2193

=== Metonic series ===
The metonic series repeats eclipses every 19 years (6939.69 days), lasting about 5 cycles. Eclipses occur in nearly the same calendar date. In addition, the octon subseries repeats 1/5 of that or every 3.8 years (1387.94 days). All eclipses in this table occur at the Moon's descending node.

22 eclipse events between June 23, 2047 and November 16, 2134
June 22–23	April 10–11	January 27–29	November 15–16	September 3–5
118	120	122	124	126
June 23, 2047	April 11, 2051	January 27, 2055	November 16, 2058	September 3, 2062
128	130	132	134	136
June 22, 2066	April 11, 2070	January 27, 2074	November 15, 2077	September 3, 2081
138	140	142	144	146
June 22, 2085	April 10, 2089	January 27, 2093	November 15, 2096	September 4, 2100
148	150	152	154	156
June 22, 2104	April 11, 2108	January 29, 2112	November 16, 2115	September 5, 2119
158	160	162	164	
June 23, 2123			November 16, 2134	

=== Tritos series ===
This eclipse is a part of a tritos cycle, repeating at alternating nodes every 135 synodic months (≈ 3986.63 days, or 11 years minus 1 month). Their appearance and longitude are irregular due to a lack of synchronization with the anomalistic month (period of perigee), but groupings of 3 tritos cycles (≈ 33 years minus 3 months) come close (≈ 434.044 anomalistic months), so eclipses are similar in these groupings.

Series members between 1801 and 2200
September 8, 1801 (Saros 112)	August 7, 1812 (Saros 113)	July 8, 1823 (Saros 114)	June 7, 1834 (Saros 115)	May 6, 1845 (Saros 116)
April 5, 1856 (Saros 117)	March 6, 1867 (Saros 118)	February 2, 1878 (Saros 119)	January 1, 1889 (Saros 120)	December 3, 1899 (Saros 121)
November 2, 1910 (Saros 122)	October 1, 1921 (Saros 123)	August 31, 1932 (Saros 124)	August 1, 1943 (Saros 125)	June 30, 1954 (Saros 126)
May 30, 1965 (Saros 127)	April 29, 1976 (Saros 128)	March 29, 1987 (Saros 129)	February 26, 1998 (Saros 130)	January 26, 2009 (Saros 131)
December 26, 2019 (Saros 132)	November 25, 2030 (Saros 133)	October 25, 2041 (Saros 134)	September 22, 2052 (Saros 135)	August 24, 2063 (Saros 136)
July 24, 2074 (Saros 137)	June 22, 2085 (Saros 138)	May 22, 2096 (Saros 139)	April 23, 2107 (Saros 140)	March 22, 2118 (Saros 141)
February 18, 2129 (Saros 142)	January 20, 2140 (Saros 143)	December 19, 2150 (Saros 144)	November 17, 2161 (Saros 145)	October 17, 2172 (Saros 146)
September 16, 2183 (Saros 147)	August 16, 2194 (Saros 148)			

=== Inex series ===
This eclipse is a part of the long period inex cycle, repeating at alternating nodes, every 358 synodic months (≈ 10,571.95 days, or 29 years minus 20 days). Their appearance and longitude are irregular due to a lack of synchronization with the anomalistic month (period of perigee). However, groupings of 3 inex cycles (≈ 87 years minus 2 months) comes close (≈ 1,151.02 anomalistic months), so eclipses are similar in these groupings.

Series members between 1801 and 2200
December 20, 1824 (Saros 129)	November 30, 1853 (Saros 130)	November 10, 1882 (Saros 131)
October 22, 1911 (Saros 132)	October 1, 1940 (Saros 133)	September 11, 1969 (Saros 134)
August 22, 1998 (Saros 135)	August 2, 2027 (Saros 136)	July 12, 2056 (Saros 137)
June 22, 2085 (Saros 138)	June 3, 2114 (Saros 139)	May 14, 2143 (Saros 140)
April 23, 2172 (Saros 141)		
