= Solar Saros 138 =

Saros cycle series 138 for solar eclipses

Historic saros cycle animation

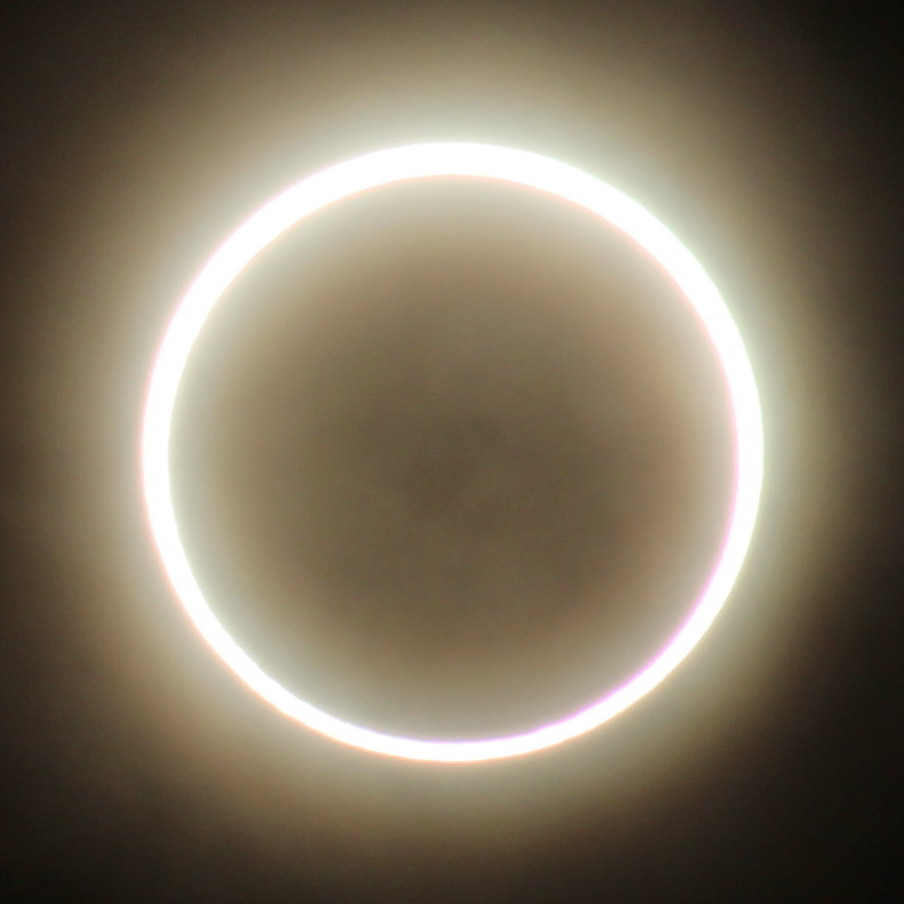
May 10, 2013 Annularity viewed from Churchills Head, Australia Series member 31

Saros cycle series 138 for solar eclipses occurs at the Moon's descending node, repeating every 18 years, 11 days, containing 70 eclipses, 54 of which are umbral (50 annular, 1 hybrid, 3 total). The first eclipse of the series was on 6 June 1472 and the last will be on 11 July 2716. The most recent eclipse was an annular eclipse on 10 May 2013 and the next will be an annular eclipse on 21 May 2031.

The longest duration of totality will be only 56 seconds on April 3, 2554 while the longest annular was 8 minutes 2 seconds on 11 February 1869.

This solar saros is linked to Lunar Saros 131.

Series members 25-41 occurring between 1901 and 2200:
25	26	27
March 6, 1905	March 17, 1923	March 27, 1941
28	29	30
April 8, 1959	April 18, 1977	April 29, 1995
31	32	33
May 10, 2013	May 21, 2031	May 31, 2049
34	35	36
June 11, 2067	June 22, 2085	July 4, 2103
37	38	39
July 14, 2121	July 25, 2139	August 5, 2157
40	41	
August 16, 2175	August 26, 2193	

== Umbral eclipses ==
Umbral eclipses (annular, total and hybrid) can be further classified as either: 1) Central (two limits), 2) Central (one limit) or 3) Non-Central (one limit). The statistical distribution of these classes in Saros series 138 appears in the following table.

Classification	Number	Percent
All Umbral eclipses	54	100.00%
Central (two limits)	53	98.15%
Central (one limit)	0	0.00%
Non-central (one limit)	1	1.85%

== All eclipses ==
Note: Dates are given in the Julian calendar prior to 15 October 1582, and in the Gregorian calendar after that.

Saros	Member	Date	Time (Greatest) UTC	Type	Location Lat, Long	Gamma	Mag.	Width (km)	Duration (min:sec)	Ref
138	1	June 6, 1472	20:20:31	Partial	66.4S 132.2W	-1.5448	0.0209			
138	2	June 18, 1490	2:55:30	Partial	65.4S 118.7E	-1.4661	0.1592			
138	3	June 28, 1508	9:28:44	Partial	64.5S 10.4E	-1.386	0.2993			
138	4	July 9, 1526	16:02:42	Partial	63.6S 97.8W	-1.3063	0.4379			
138	5	July 19, 1544	22:38:22	Partial	62.8S 153.9E	-1.2281	0.573			
138	6	July 31, 1562	5:16:46	Partial	62.2S 45.1E	-1.1522	0.7034			
138	7	August 10, 1580	12:00:05	Partial	61.6S 64.7W	-1.0802	0.8258			
138	8	August 31, 1598	18:48:48	Annular (Note: Non-central)	61.2S 175.6W	-1.0126	0.9398	-	-	
138	9	September 11, 1616	1:44:06	Annular	54.1S 102.3E	-0.9505	0.9319	807	5m 42s	
138	10	September 22, 1634	8:47:04	Annular	51.5S 2.3E	-0.8947	0.93	572	6m 3s	
138	11	October 2, 1652	15:58:30	Annular	51.2S 102.7W	-0.8458	0.9275	497	6m 19s	
138	12	October 13, 1670	23:19:00	Annular	52.4S 149.1E	-0.8043	0.9247	467	6m 34s	
138	13	October 24, 1688	6:46:41	Annular	54.4S 39.2E	-0.7686	0.9221	453	6m 49s	
138	14	November 5, 1706	14:23:57	Annular	57S 72.6W	-0.7407	0.9195	449	7m 2s	
138	15	November 15, 1724	22:07:38	Annular	59.9S 175E	-0.7183	0.9174	448	7m 15s	
138	16	November 27, 1742	5:58:59	Annular	62.6S 62.2E	-0.7019	0.9156	450	7m 26s	
138	17	December 7, 1760	13:53:44	Annular	64.7S 49.4W	-0.6881	0.9144	451	7m 36s	
138	18	December 18, 1778	21:53:54	Annular	65.8S 160.6W	-0.6788	0.9137	450	7m 44s	
138	19	December 29, 1796	5:54:58	Annular	65.5S 88.6E	-0.6703	0.9136	446	7m 51s	
138	20	January 10, 1815	13:57:06	Annular	63.7S 23.6W	-0.6626	0.9143	438	7m 55s	
138	21	January 20, 1833	21:56:55	Annular	60.6S 137.4W	-0.653	0.9155	426	7m 59s	
138	22	February 1, 1851	5:54:27	Annular	56.4S 106.9E	-0.6413	0.9175	409	8m 1s	
138	23	February 11, 1869	13:46:39	Annular	51.3S 9.7W	-0.6251	0.9201	387	8m 2s	
138	24	February 22, 1887	21:33:04	Annular	45.7S 126.5W	-0.604	0.9232	362	8m 1s	
138	25	March 6, 1905	5:12:26	Annular	39.5S 117.4E	-0.5768	0.9269	334	7m 58s	
138	26	March 17, 1923	12:44:58	Annular	33S 2.4E	-0.5438	0.931	305	7m 51s	
138	27	March 27, 1941	20:08:08	Annular	26.2S 110.9W	-0.5025	0.9355	276	7m 41s	
138	28	April 8, 1959	3:24:08	Annular	19.1S 137.6E	-0.4546	0.9401	247	7m 26s	
138	29	April 18, 1977	10:31:30	Annular	11.9S 28.3E	-0.399	0.9449	220	7m 4s	
138	30	April 29, 1995	17:33:20	Annular	4.8S 79.4W	-0.3382	0.9497	196	6m 37s	
138	31	May 10, 2013	0:26:20	Annular	2.2N 175.5E	-0.2694	0.9544	173	6m 3s	
138	32	May 21, 2031	7:16:04	Annular	8.9N 71.7E	-0.197	0.9589	152	5m 26s	
138	33	May 31, 2049	13:59:59	Annular	15.3N 29.9W	-0.1187	0.9631	134	4m 45s	
138	34	June 11, 2067	20:42:26	Annular	21N 130.2W	-0.0387	0.967	119	4m 5s	
138	35	June 22, 2085	3:21:16	Annular	26.2N 131.3E	0.0452	0.9704	106	3m 29s	
138	36	July 4, 2103	10:01:48	Annular	30.3N 33.2E	0.1285	0.9734	96	2m 57s	
138	37	July 14, 2121	16:42:39	Annular	33.6N 64.3W	0.2125	0.9758	88	2m 32s	
138	38	July 25, 2139	23:26:33	Annular	35.8N 161.9W	0.2946	0.9778	83	2m 13s	
138	39	August 5, 2157	6:14:20	Annular	37.1N 99.6E	0.3743	0.9792	80	1m 59s	
138	40	August 16, 2175	13:08:17	Annular	37.6N 0.5W	0.4497	0.9802	78	1m 50s	
138	41	August 26, 2193	20:09:20	Annular	37.4N 102.9W	0.52	0.9806	80	1m 45s	
138	42	September 8, 2211	3:17:18	Annular	36.9N 152.5E	0.5854	0.9808	83	1m 43s	
138	43	September 18, 2229	10:34:51	Annular	36.2N 44.8E	0.6439	0.9805	89	1m 44s	
138	44	September 29, 2247	18:01:05	Annular	35.6N 65.9W	0.6961	0.9801	96	1m 47s	
138	45	October 10, 2265	1:37:34	Annular	35.1N 179.8W	0.7404	0.9796	105	1m 51s	
138	46	October 21, 2283	9:23:11	Annular	34.9N 63.2E	0.7783	0.979	116	1m 56s	
138	47	November 1, 2301	17:19:33	Annular	34.8N 57.2W	0.808	0.9786	126	2m 1s	
138	48	November 13, 2319	1:24:39	Annular	35N 179.6E	0.8314	0.9784	136	2m 4s	
138	49	November 23, 2337	9:37:55	Annular	35.5N 53.8E	0.8488	0.9786	142	2m 5s	
138	50	December 4, 2355	17:58:37	Annular	36N 74.4W	0.8609	0.9792	145	2m 2s	
138	51	December 15, 2373	2:25:55	Annular	36.7N 155.4E	0.8678	0.9803	141	1m 56s	
138	52	December 26, 2391	10:57:15	Annular	37.6N 24E	0.8723	0.982	131	1m 46s	
138	53	January 5, 2410	19:31:39	Annular	38.8N 108.2W	0.8749	0.9842	116	1m 31s	
138	54	January 17, 2428	4:07:20	Annular	40.5N 119.1E	0.877	0.987	96	1m 13s	
138	55	January 27, 2446	12:43:51	Annular	42.7N 13.9W	0.8789	0.9903	72	0m 53s	
138	56	February 7, 2464	21:17:16	Annular	45.7N 146.4W	0.884	0.9941	44	0m 31s	
138	57	February 18, 2482	5:48:52	Annular	49.3N 81.2E	0.8912	0.9982	14	0m 9s	
138	58	March 1, 2500	14:14:47	Hybrid	53.9N 50.7W	0.9038	1.0026	21	0m 12s	
138	59	March 12, 2518	22:37:02	Total	59.1N 176.7E	0.92	1.0071	63	0m 31s	
138	60	March 23, 2536	6:51:06	Total	65.3N 42E	0.9435	1.0115	121	0m 46s	
138	61	April 3, 2554	15:00:51	Total	71.5N 102.2W	0.9713	1.0153	232	0m 56s	
138	62	April 13, 2572	23:02:08	Partial	71.5N 81.8E	1.0068	0.9902			
138	63	April 25, 2590	6:57:46	Partial	70.9N 50.1W	1.0476	0.9167			
138	64	May 6, 2608	14:45:32	Partial	70.1N 179.4W	1.0954	0.8288			
138	65	May 17, 2626	22:28:40	Partial	69.1N 53.1E	1.1476	0.7318			
138	66	May 28, 2644	6:05:58	Partial	68.2N 72.3W	1.2051	0.6236			
138	67	June 8, 2662	13:38:43	Partial	67.2N 163.9E	1.2666	0.5068			
138	68	June 18, 2680	21:08:08	Partial	66.2N 41.5E	1.3315	0.3827			
138	69	June 30, 2698	4:35:43	Partial	65.3N 80.1W	1.3983	0.2539			
138	70	July 11, 2716	12:01:43	Partial	64.4N 159.1E	1.4666	0.1219			
