= Solar eclipse of August 24, 2063 =

Total eclipse

- Total eclipse
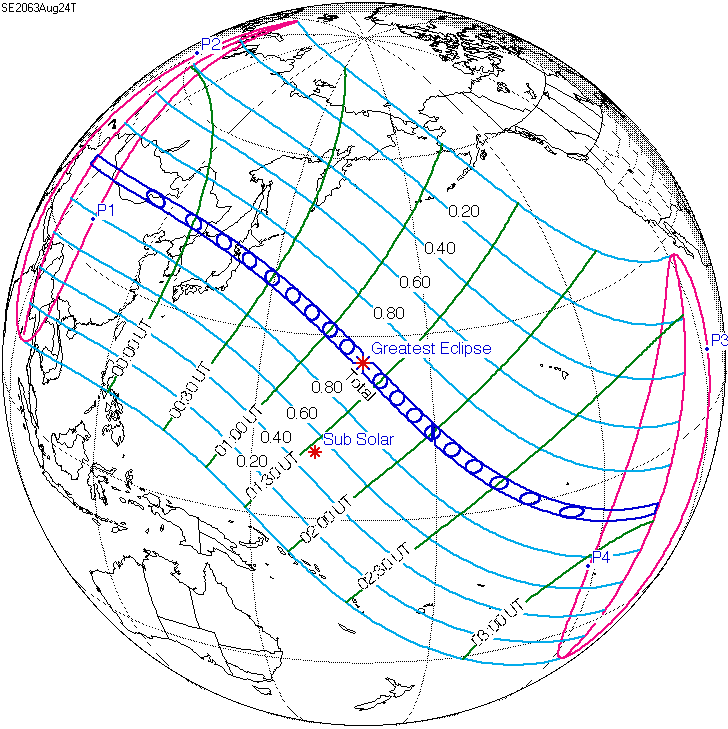
- Map
- Gamma: 0.2771
- Magnitude: 1.075

Maximum eclipse
- Duration: 349 s (5 min 49 s)
- Coordinates: 25.6°N 168.4°E
- Max. width of band: 252 km (157 mi)

Times (UTC)
- Greatest eclipse: 1:22:11

References
- Saros: 136 (40 of 71)
- Catalog # (SE5000): 9649

A total solar eclipse will occur at the Moon's descending node of orbit between Thursday, August 23 and Friday, August 24, 2063, with a magnitude of 1.075. A solar eclipse occurs when the Moon passes between Earth and the Sun, thereby totally or partly obscuring the image of the Sun for a viewer on Earth. A total solar eclipse occurs when the Moon's apparent diameter is larger than the Sun's, blocking all direct sunlight, turning day into darkness. Totality occurs in a narrow path across Earth's surface, with the partial solar eclipse visible over a surrounding region thousands of kilometres wide. Occurring about 2.5 hours before perigee (on August 24, 2063, at 3:50 UTC), the Moon's apparent diameter will be larger. Perigee did occur near the very end of this eclipse.

The path of totality will be visible from parts of northern China, Mongolia, the northeastern tip of North Korea, southern Primorsky Krai of Russia, northern Japan, and parts of French Polynesia. A partial solar eclipse will also be visible for parts of East Asia, North Asia, Hawaii, and Oceania.

== Eclipse details ==
Shown below are two tables displaying details about this particular solar eclipse. The first table outlines times at which the Moon's penumbra or umbra attains the specific parameter, and the second table describes various other parameters pertaining to this eclipse.

August 24, 2063 Solar Eclipse Times
Event	Time (UTC)
First Penumbral External Contact	2063 August 23 at 22:47:34.7 UTC
First Umbral External Contact	2063 August 23 at 23:42:04.1 UTC
First Central Line	2063 August 23 at 23:43:38.1 UTC
First Umbral Internal Contact	2063 August 23 at 23:45:12.3 UTC
First Penumbral Internal Contact	2063 August 24 at 00:43:41.8 UTC
Equatorial Conjunction	2063 August 24 at 01:08:02.8 UTC
Greatest Duration	2063 August 24 at 01:17:30.5 UTC
Ecliptic Conjunction	2063 August 24 at 01:19:21.7 UTC
Greatest Eclipse	2063 August 24 at 01:22:10.6 UTC
Last Penumbral Internal Contact	2063 August 24 at 02:00:58.2 UTC
Last Umbral Internal Contact	2063 August 24 at 02:59:17.7 UTC
Last Central Line	2063 August 24 at 03:00:51.8 UTC
Last Umbral External Contact	2063 August 24 at 03:02:25.7 UTC
Last Penumbral External Contact	2063 August 24 at 03:56:52.1 UTC

August 24, 2063 Solar Eclipse Parameters
Parameter	Value
Eclipse Magnitude	1.07497
Eclipse Obscuration	1.15557
Gamma	0.27715
Sun Right Ascension	10h12m03.7s
Sun Declination	+11°07'34.9"
Sun Semi-Diameter	15'48.9"
Sun Equatorial Horizontal Parallax	08.7"
Moon Right Ascension	10h12m34.5s
Moon Declination	+11°22'46.8"
Moon Semi-Diameter	16'43.4"
Moon Equatorial Horizontal Parallax	1°01'22.6"
ΔT	92.9 s

== Eclipse season ==
This eclipse is part of an eclipse season, a period, roughly every six months, when eclipses occur. Only two (or occasionally three) eclipse seasons occur each year, and each season lasts about 35 days and repeats just short of six months (173 days) later; thus two full eclipse seasons always occur each year. Either two or three eclipses happen each eclipse season. In the sequence below, each eclipse is separated by a fortnight.

Eclipse season of August–September 2063
August 24 Descending node (new moon)	September 7 Ascending node (full moon)
Total solar eclipse Solar Saros 136	Penumbral lunar eclipse Lunar Saros 148

== Related eclipses ==
=== Eclipses in 2063 ===
- An annular solar eclipse on February 28.
- A partial lunar eclipse on March 14.
- A total solar eclipse on August 24.
- A penumbral lunar eclipse on September 7.

=== Metonic ===
- Preceded by: Solar eclipse of November 5, 2059
- Followed by: Solar eclipse of June 11, 2067

=== Tzolkinex ===
- Preceded by: Solar eclipse of July 12, 2056
- Followed by: Solar eclipse of October 4, 2070

=== Half-Saros ===
- Preceded by: Lunar eclipse of August 18, 2054
- Followed by: Lunar eclipse of August 28, 2072

=== Tritos ===
- Preceded by: Solar eclipse of September 22, 2052
- Followed by: Solar eclipse of July 24, 2074

=== Solar Saros 136 ===
- Preceded by: Solar eclipse of August 12, 2045
- Followed by: Solar eclipse of September 3, 2081

=== Inex ===
- Preceded by: Solar eclipse of September 12, 2034
- Followed by: Solar eclipse of August 3, 2092

=== Triad ===
- Preceded by: Solar eclipse of October 23, 1976
- Followed by: Solar eclipse of June 25, 2150

=== Solar eclipses of 2062–2065 ===
This eclipse is a member of a semester series. An eclipse in a semester series of solar eclipses repeats approximately every 177 days and 4 hours (a semester) at alternating nodes of the Moon's orbit.

The partial solar eclipses on July 3, 2065 and December 27, 2065 occur in the next lunar year eclipse set.

Solar eclipse series sets from 2062 to 2065
Ascending node			Descending node		
Saros	Map	Gamma	Saros	Map	Gamma
121	March 11, 2062 Partial	−1.0238	126	September 3, 2062 Partial	1.0191
131	February 28, 2063 Annular	−0.336	136	August 24, 2063 Total	0.2771
141	February 17, 2064 Annular	0.3597	146	August 12, 2064 Total	−0.4652
151	February 5, 2065 Partial	1.0336	156	August 2, 2065 Partial	−1.2759

=== Saros 136 ===
This eclipse is a part of Saros series 136, repeating every 18 years, 11 days, and containing 71 events. The series started with a partial solar eclipse on June 14, 1360. It contains annular eclipses from September 8, 1504 through November 12, 1594; hybrid eclipses from November 22, 1612 through January 17, 1703; and total eclipses from January 27, 1721 through May 13, 2496. The series ends at member 71 as a partial eclipse on July 30, 2622. Its eclipses are tabulated in three columns; every third eclipse in the same column is one exeligmos apart, so they all cast shadows over approximately the same parts of the Earth.

The longest duration of annularity was produced by member 9 at 32 seconds on September 8, 1504, and the longest duration of totality was produced by member 34 at 7 minutes, 7.74 seconds on June 20, 1955. All eclipses in this series occur at the Moon’s descending node of orbit.

Series members 26–47 occur between 1801 and 2200:
26	27	28
March 24, 1811	April 3, 1829	April 15, 1847
29	30	31
April 25, 1865	May 6, 1883	May 18, 1901
32	33	34
May 29, 1919	June 8, 1937	June 20, 1955
35	36	37
June 30, 1973	July 11, 1991	July 22, 2009
38	39	40
August 2, 2027	August 12, 2045	August 24, 2063
41	42	43
September 3, 2081	September 14, 2099	September 26, 2117
44	45	46
October 7, 2135	October 17, 2153	October 29, 2171
47
November 8, 2189

=== Metonic series ===
The metonic series repeats eclipses every 19 years (6939.69 days), lasting about 5 cycles. Eclipses occur in nearly the same calendar date. In addition, the octon subseries repeats 1/5 of that or every 3.8 years (1387.94 days). All eclipses in this table occur at the Moon's descending node.

22 eclipse events between June 12, 2029 and November 4, 2116
June 11–12	March 30–31	January 16	November 4–5	August 23–24
118	120	122	124	126
June 12, 2029	March 30, 2033	January 16, 2037	November 4, 2040	August 23, 2044
128	130	132	134	136
June 11, 2048	March 30, 2052	January 16, 2056	November 5, 2059	August 24, 2063
138	140	142	144	146
June 11, 2067	March 31, 2071	January 16, 2075	November 4, 2078	August 24, 2082
148	150	152	154	156
June 11, 2086	March 31, 2090	January 16, 2094	November 4, 2097	August 24, 2101
158	160	162	164	
June 12, 2105			November 4, 2116	

=== Tritos series ===
This eclipse is a part of a tritos cycle, repeating at alternating nodes every 135 synodic months (≈ 3986.63 days, or 11 years minus 1 month). Their appearance and longitude are irregular due to a lack of synchronization with the anomalistic month (period of perigee), but groupings of 3 tritos cycles (≈ 33 years minus 3 months) come close (≈ 434.044 anomalistic months), so eclipses are similar in these groupings.

Series members between 1801 and 2200
September 8, 1801 (Saros 112)	August 7, 1812 (Saros 113)	July 8, 1823 (Saros 114)	June 7, 1834 (Saros 115)	May 6, 1845 (Saros 116)
April 5, 1856 (Saros 117)	March 6, 1867 (Saros 118)	February 2, 1878 (Saros 119)	January 1, 1889 (Saros 120)	December 3, 1899 (Saros 121)
November 2, 1910 (Saros 122)	October 1, 1921 (Saros 123)	August 31, 1932 (Saros 124)	August 1, 1943 (Saros 125)	June 30, 1954 (Saros 126)
May 30, 1965 (Saros 127)	April 29, 1976 (Saros 128)	March 29, 1987 (Saros 129)	February 26, 1998 (Saros 130)	January 26, 2009 (Saros 131)
December 26, 2019 (Saros 132)	November 25, 2030 (Saros 133)	October 25, 2041 (Saros 134)	September 22, 2052 (Saros 135)	August 24, 2063 (Saros 136)
July 24, 2074 (Saros 137)	June 22, 2085 (Saros 138)	May 22, 2096 (Saros 139)	April 23, 2107 (Saros 140)	March 22, 2118 (Saros 141)
February 18, 2129 (Saros 142)	January 20, 2140 (Saros 143)	December 19, 2150 (Saros 144)	November 17, 2161 (Saros 145)	October 17, 2172 (Saros 146)
September 16, 2183 (Saros 147)	August 16, 2194 (Saros 148)			

=== Inex series ===
This eclipse is a part of the long period inex cycle, repeating at alternating nodes, every 358 synodic months (≈ 10,571.95 days, or 29 years minus 20 days). Their appearance and longitude are irregular due to a lack of synchronization with the anomalistic month (period of perigee). However, groupings of 3 inex cycles (≈ 87 years minus 2 months) comes close (≈ 1,151.02 anomalistic months), so eclipses are similar in these groupings.

Series members between 1801 and 2200
February 21, 1803 (Saros 127)	February 1, 1832 (Saros 128)	January 11, 1861 (Saros 129)
December 22, 1889 (Saros 130)	December 3, 1918 (Saros 131)	November 12, 1947 (Saros 132)
October 23, 1976 (Saros 133)	October 3, 2005 (Saros 134)	September 12, 2034 (Saros 135)
August 24, 2063 (Saros 136)	August 3, 2092 (Saros 137)	July 14, 2121 (Saros 138)
June 25, 2150 (Saros 139)	June 5, 2179 (Saros 140)	
