= Solar eclipse of April 18, 1977 =

Annular solar eclipse

- Annular eclipse
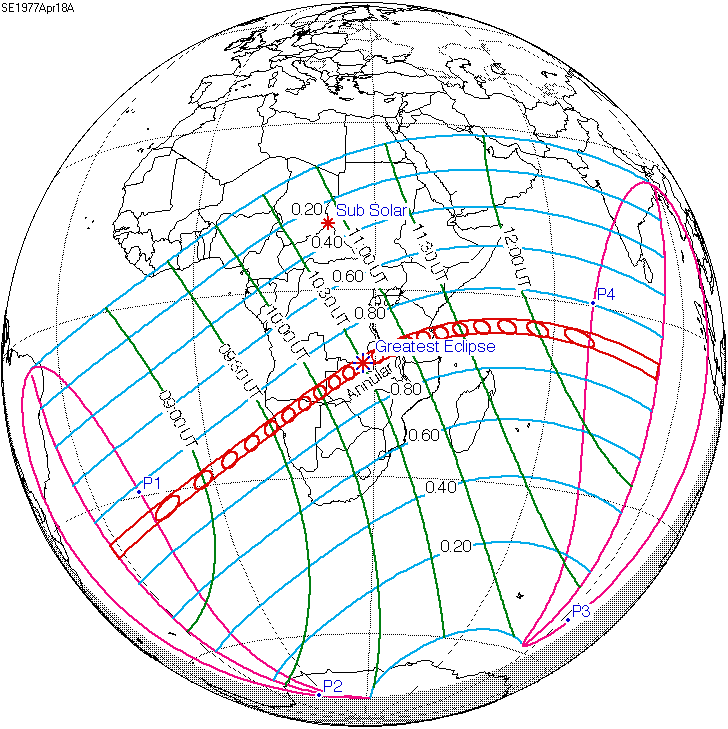
- Map
- Gamma: −0.399
- Magnitude: 0.9449

Maximum eclipse
- Duration: 424 s (7 min 4 s)
- Coordinates: 11.9°S 28.3°E
- Max. width of band: 220 km (140 mi)

Times (UTC)
- Greatest eclipse: 10:31:30

References
- Saros: 138 (29 of 70)
- Catalog # (SE5000): 9458

An annular solar eclipse occurred at the Moon's descending node of orbit on Monday, April 18, 1977, with a magnitude of 0.9449. A solar eclipse occurs when the Moon passes between Earth and the Sun, thereby totally or partly obscuring the image of the Sun for a viewer on Earth. An annular solar eclipse occurs when the Moon's apparent diameter is smaller than the Sun's, blocking most of the Sun's light and causing the Sun to look like an annulus (ring). An annular eclipse appears as a partial eclipse over a region of the Earth thousands of kilometres wide. Occurring about 3.1 days before apogee (on April 21, 1977, at 13:00 UTC), the Moon's apparent diameter was smaller.

Annularity was visible in South West Africa (today's Namibia), Angola, Zambia, southeastern Zaire (today's Democratic Republic of Congo), northern Malawi, Tanzania, Seychelles and the whole British Indian Ocean Territory. A partial eclipse was visible for parts of eastern Brazil, Southern Africa, Central Africa, East Africa, Antarctica, the Middle East, and South Asia.

== Eclipse details ==
Shown below are two tables displaying details about this particular solar eclipse. The first table outlines times at which the Moon's penumbra or umbra attains the specific parameter, and the second table describes various other parameters pertaining to this eclipse.

April 18, 1977 Solar Eclipse Times
Event	Time (UTC)
First Penumbral External Contact	1977 April 18 at 07:33:32.8 UTC
First Umbral External Contact	1977 April 18 at 08:41:17.9 UTC
First Central Line	1977 April 18 at 08:43:51.9 UTC
First Umbral Internal Contact	1977 April 18 at 08:46:26.6 UTC
First Penumbral Internal Contact	1977 April 18 at 10:12:31.9 UTC
Equatorial Conjunction	1977 April 18 at 10:18:48.0 UTC
Greatest Eclipse	1977 April 18 at 10:31:29.9 UTC
Ecliptic Conjunction	1977 April 18 at 10:36:13.6 UTC
Greatest Duration	1977 April 18 at 10:40:30.0 UTC
Last Penumbral Internal Contact	1977 April 18 at 10:50:48.6 UTC
Last Umbral Internal Contact	1977 April 18 at 12:16:41.3 UTC
Last Central Line	1977 April 18 at 12:19:17.4 UTC
Last Umbral External Contact	1977 April 18 at 12:21:52.9 UTC
Last Penumbral External Contact	1977 April 18 at 13:29:36.4 UTC

April 18, 1977 Solar Eclipse Parameters
Parameter	Value
Eclipse Magnitude	0.94492
Eclipse Obscuration	0.89288
Gamma	−0.39903
Sun Right Ascension	01h45m03.2s
Sun Declination	+10°51'37.2"
Sun Semi-Diameter	15'55.5"
Sun Equatorial Horizontal Parallax	08.8"
Moon Right Ascension	01h45m26.3s
Moon Declination	+10°30'41.9"
Moon Semi-Diameter	14'50.4"
Moon Equatorial Horizontal Parallax	0°54'28.0"
ΔT	47.8 s

== Eclipse season ==
This eclipse is part of an eclipse season, a period, roughly every six months, when eclipses occur. Only two (or occasionally three) eclipse seasons occur each year, and each season lasts about 35 days and repeats just short of six months (173 days) later; thus two full eclipse seasons always occur each year. Either two or three eclipses happen each eclipse season. In the sequence below, each eclipse is separated by a fortnight.

Eclipse season of April 1977
April 4 Ascending node (full moon)	April 18 Descending node (new moon)
Partial lunar eclipse Lunar Saros 112	Annular solar eclipse Solar Saros 138

== Related eclipses ==
=== Eclipses in 1977 ===
- A partial lunar eclipse on April 4.
- An annular solar eclipse on April 18.
- A penumbral lunar eclipse on September 27.
- A total solar eclipse on October 12.

=== Metonic ===
- Preceded by: Solar eclipse of June 30, 1973
- Followed by: Solar eclipse of February 4, 1981

=== Tzolkinex ===
- Preceded by: Solar eclipse of March 7, 1970
- Followed by: Solar eclipse of May 30, 1984

=== Half-Saros ===
- Preceded by: Lunar eclipse of April 13, 1968
- Followed by: Lunar eclipse of April 24, 1986

=== Tritos ===
- Preceded by: Solar eclipse of May 20, 1966
- Followed by: Solar eclipse of March 18, 1988

=== Solar Saros 138 ===
- Preceded by: Solar eclipse of April 8, 1959
- Followed by: Solar eclipse of April 29, 1995

=== Inex ===
- Preceded by: Solar eclipse of May 9, 1948
- Followed by: Solar eclipse of March 29, 2006

=== Triad ===
- Preceded by: Solar eclipse of June 17, 1890
- Followed by: Solar eclipse of February 17, 2064

=== Solar eclipses of 1975–1978 ===
This eclipse is a member of a semester series. An eclipse in a semester series of solar eclipses repeats approximately every 177 days and 4 hours (a semester) at alternating nodes of the Moon's orbit.

Solar eclipse series sets from 1975 to 1978
Descending node			Ascending node		
Saros	Map	Gamma	Saros	Map	Gamma
118	May 11, 1975 Partial	1.0647	123	November 3, 1975 Partial	−1.0248
128	April 29, 1976 Annular	0.3378	133	October 23, 1976 Total	−0.327
138	April 18, 1977 Annular	−0.399	143	October 12, 1977 Total	0.3836
148	April 7, 1978 Partial	−1.1081	153	October 2, 1978 Partial	1.1616

=== Saros 138 ===
This eclipse is a part of Saros series 138, repeating every 18 years, 11 days, and containing 70 events. The series started with a partial solar eclipse on June 6, 1472. It contains annular eclipses from August 31, 1598 through February 18, 2482; a hybrid eclipse on March 1, 2500; and total eclipses from March 12, 2518 through April 3, 2554. The series ends at member 70 as a partial eclipse on July 11, 2716. Its eclipses are tabulated in three columns; every third eclipse in the same column is one exeligmos apart, so they all cast shadows over approximately the same parts of the Earth.

The longest duration of annularity was produced by member 23 at 8 minutes, 2 seconds on February 11, 1869, and the longest duration of totality will be produced by member 61 at 56 seconds on April 3, 2554. All eclipses in this series occur at the Moon’s descending node of orbit.

Series members 20–41 occur between 1801 and 2200:
20	21	22
January 10, 1815	January 20, 1833	February 1, 1851
23	24	25
February 11, 1869	February 22, 1887	March 6, 1905
26	27	28
March 17, 1923	March 27, 1941	April 8, 1959
29	30	31
April 18, 1977	April 29, 1995	May 10, 2013
32	33	34
May 21, 2031	May 31, 2049	June 11, 2067
35	36	37
June 22, 2085	July 4, 2103	July 14, 2121
38	39	40
July 25, 2139	August 5, 2157	August 16, 2175
41
August 26, 2193

=== Metonic series ===
The metonic series repeats eclipses every 19 years (6939.69 days), lasting about 5 cycles. Eclipses occur in nearly the same calendar date. In addition, the octon subseries repeats 1/5 of that or every 3.8 years (1387.94 days). All eclipses in this table occur at the Moon's descending node.

22 eclipse events between September 12, 1931 and July 1, 2011
September 11–12	June 30–July 1	April 17–19	February 4–5	November 22–23
114	116	118	120	122
September 12, 1931	June 30, 1935	April 19, 1939	February 4, 1943	November 23, 1946
124	126	128	130	132
September 12, 1950	June 30, 1954	April 19, 1958	February 5, 1962	November 23, 1965
134	136	138	140	142
September 11, 1969	June 30, 1973	April 18, 1977	February 4, 1981	November 22, 1984
144	146	148	150	152
September 11, 1988	June 30, 1992	April 17, 1996	February 5, 2000	November 23, 2003
154	156			
September 11, 2007	July 1, 2011			

=== Tritos series ===
This eclipse is a part of a tritos cycle, repeating at alternating nodes every 135 synodic months (≈ 3986.63 days, or 11 years minus 1 month). Their appearance and longitude are irregular due to a lack of synchronization with the anomalistic month (period of perigee), but groupings of 3 tritos cycles (≈ 33 years minus 3 months) come close (≈ 434.044 anomalistic months), so eclipses are similar in these groupings.

Series members between 1801 and 2200
August 28, 1802 (Saros 122)	July 27, 1813 (Saros 123)	June 26, 1824 (Saros 124)	May 27, 1835 (Saros 125)	April 25, 1846 (Saros 126)
March 25, 1857 (Saros 127)	February 23, 1868 (Saros 128)	January 22, 1879 (Saros 129)	December 22, 1889 (Saros 130)	November 22, 1900 (Saros 131)
October 22, 1911 (Saros 132)	September 21, 1922 (Saros 133)	August 21, 1933 (Saros 134)	July 20, 1944 (Saros 135)	June 20, 1955 (Saros 136)
May 20, 1966 (Saros 137)	April 18, 1977 (Saros 138)	March 18, 1988 (Saros 139)	February 16, 1999 (Saros 140)	January 15, 2010 (Saros 141)
December 14, 2020 (Saros 142)	November 14, 2031 (Saros 143)	October 14, 2042 (Saros 144)	September 12, 2053 (Saros 145)	August 12, 2064 (Saros 146)
July 13, 2075 (Saros 147)	June 11, 2086 (Saros 148)	May 11, 2097 (Saros 149)	April 11, 2108 (Saros 150)	March 11, 2119 (Saros 151)
February 8, 2130 (Saros 152)	January 8, 2141 (Saros 153)	December 8, 2151 (Saros 154)	November 7, 2162 (Saros 155)	October 7, 2173 (Saros 156)
September 4, 2184 (Saros 157)	August 5, 2195 (Saros 158)			

=== Inex series ===
This eclipse is a part of the long period inex cycle, repeating at alternating nodes, every 358 synodic months (≈ 10,571.95 days, or 29 years minus 20 days). Their appearance and longitude are irregular due to a lack of synchronization with the anomalistic month (period of perigee). However, groupings of 3 inex cycles (≈ 87 years minus 2 months) comes close (≈ 1,151.02 anomalistic months), so eclipses are similar in these groupings.

Series members between 1801 and 2200
August 17, 1803 (Saros 132)	July 27, 1832 (Saros 133)	July 8, 1861 (Saros 134)
June 17, 1890 (Saros 135)	May 29, 1919 (Saros 136)	May 9, 1948 (Saros 137)
April 18, 1977 (Saros 138)	March 29, 2006 (Saros 139)	March 9, 2035 (Saros 140)
February 17, 2064 (Saros 141)	January 27, 2093 (Saros 142)	January 8, 2122 (Saros 143)
December 19, 2150 (Saros 144)	November 28, 2179 (Saros 145)	
