= Solar eclipse of April 28, 1930 =

Total eclipse

- Hybrid eclipse
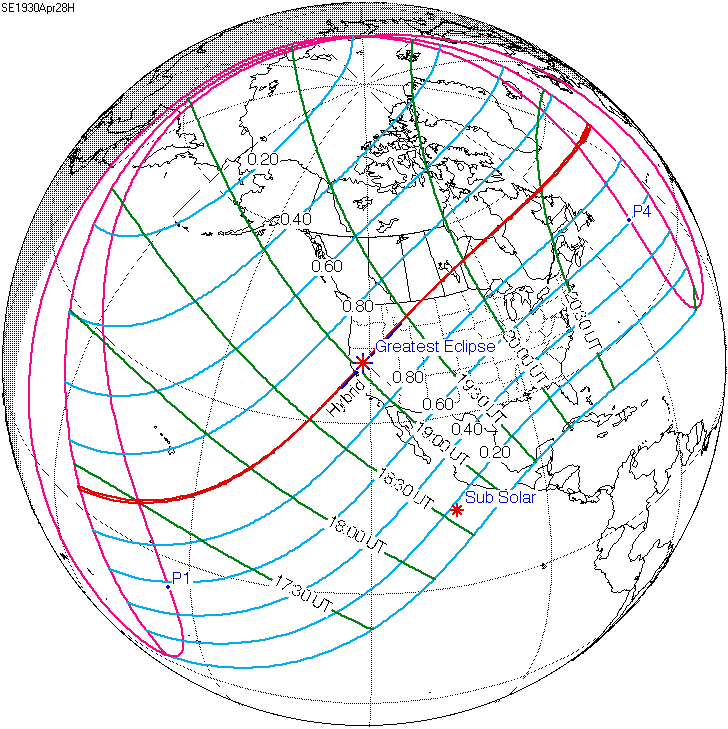
- Map
- Gamma: 0.473
- Magnitude: 1.0003

Maximum eclipse
- Duration: 1 s (0 min 1 s)
- Coordinates: 39.4°N 121.2°W
- Max. width of band: 1 km (0.62 mi)

Times (UTC)
- Greatest eclipse: 19:03:34

References
- Saros: 137 (31 of 70)
- Catalog # (SE5000): 9351

External image
- http://xjubier.free.fr/en/site_pages/solar_eclipses/HSE_19300428_pg01.html

A total solar eclipse occurred at the Moon's ascending node of orbit on Monday, April 28, 1930, with a magnitude of 1.0003. It was a hybrid event, with only a fraction of its path as total, and longer sections at the start and end as an annular eclipse. A solar eclipse occurs when the Moon passes between Earth and the Sun, thereby totally or partly obscuring the image of the Sun for a viewer on Earth. A hybrid solar eclipse is a rare type of solar eclipse that changes its appearance from annular to total and back as the Moon's shadow moves across the Earth's surface. Totality occurs between the annularity paths across the surface of the Earth, with the partial solar eclipse visible over a surrounding region thousands of kilometres wide. The Moon's apparent diameter was near the average diameter because it occurred 7.2 days after apogee (on April 21, 1930, at 13:50 UTC) and 6 days before perigee (on May 4, 1930, at 19:50 UTC).

Annularity was first visible in the eastern Pacific Ocean, then totality from California, Nevada, Oregon, Idaho and Montana, with annularity continuing northeast across the remainder of Montana and into central and eastern Canada and northern Labrador of the Dominion of Newfoundland (today's Newfoundland and Labrador in Canada). A partial eclipse was visible for parts of Hawaii, North America, and the northern Soviet Union.

== Observations ==
During a hybrid solar eclipse, the apex of the Moon's umbral cone is very close to the Earth's surface, and the magnitude is very close to 1. The edges of the Moon and the Sun are very close to each other as seen from the Earth in both the total and annular portion of the path. A series of Baily's beads on the lunar limb provide an excellent opportunity to measure the size and shape of the Earth, as well as the mountains and valleys on the lunar limb. During this eclipse, scientists recorded the precise time of each phase of the eclipse in Camptonville, California. Because the duration of totality was just over one second, the photographic film needed to be inserted quickly after the start of totality. In addition, scientists recorded audio images with a long-wave receiver on an aircraft at the Mare Island Naval Shipyard. Each image had a time accurate to 1/5 second.

Prior to it, the hybrid solar eclipse of April 17, 1912, also belonging to Solar Saros 137, also occurred with a magnitude close to 1. Observations were made near Paris, France. Similar observations were also made during the annular solar eclipses of May 9, 1948 in Rebun Island, Japan and May 20, 1966 in Greece and Turkey, also belonging to the same solar Saros cycle.

== Eclipse details ==
Shown below are two tables displaying details about this particular solar eclipse. The first table outlines times at which the Moon's penumbra or umbra attains the specific parameter, and the second table describes various other parameters pertaining to this eclipse.

April 28, 1930 Solar Eclipse Times
Event	Time (UTC)
First Penumbral External Contact	1930 April 28 at 16:20:27.5 UTC
First Umbral External Contact	1930 April 28 at 17:25:43.5 UTC
First Central Line	1930 April 28 at 17:26:14.8 UTC
Greatest Duration	1930 April 28 at 17:26:14.8 UTC
First Umbral Internal Contact	1930 April 28 at 17:26:46.1 UTC
Greatest Eclipse	1930 April 28 at 19:03:34.0 UTC
Ecliptic Conjunction	1930 April 28 at 19:08:43.9 UTC
Equatorial Conjunction	1930 April 28 at 19:27:27.4 UTC
Last Umbral Internal Contact	1930 April 28 at 20:40:09.2 UTC
Last Central Line	1930 April 28 at 20:40:37.6 UTC
Last Umbral External Contact	1930 April 28 at 20:41:06.0 UTC
Last Penumbral External Contact	1930 April 28 at 21:46:24.5 UTC

April 28, 1930 Solar Eclipse Parameters
Parameter	Value
Eclipse Magnitude	1.00026
Eclipse Obscuration	1.00053
Gamma	0.47305
Sun Right Ascension	02h21m32.7s
Sun Declination	+14°06'03.1"
Sun Semi-Diameter	15'52.8"
Sun Equatorial Horizontal Parallax	08.7"
Moon Right Ascension	02h20m46.1s
Moon Declination	+14°30'42.8"
Moon Semi-Diameter	15'39.8"
Moon Equatorial Horizontal Parallax	0°57'29.0"
ΔT	24.0 s

== Eclipse season ==
This eclipse is part of an eclipse season, a period, roughly every six months, when eclipses occur. Only two (or occasionally three) eclipse seasons occur each year, and each season lasts about 35 days and repeats just short of six months (173 days) later; thus two full eclipse seasons always occur each year. Either two or three eclipses happen each eclipse season. In the sequence below, each eclipse is separated by a fortnight.

Eclipse season of April 1930
April 13 Descending node (full moon)	April 28 Ascending node (new moon)
Partial lunar eclipse Lunar Saros 111	Hybrid solar eclipse Solar Saros 137

== Related eclipses ==
=== Eclipses in 1930 ===
- A partial lunar eclipse on April 13.
- A hybrid solar eclipse on April 28.
- A partial lunar eclipse on October 7.
- A total solar eclipse on October 21.

=== Metonic ===
- Preceded by: Solar eclipse of July 9, 1926
- Followed by: Solar eclipse of February 14, 1934

=== Tzolkinex ===
- Preceded by: Solar eclipse of March 17, 1923
- Followed by: Solar eclipse of June 8, 1937

=== Half-Saros ===
- Preceded by: Lunar eclipse of April 22, 1921
- Followed by: Lunar eclipse of May 3, 1939

=== Tritos ===
- Preceded by: Solar eclipse of May 29, 1919
- Followed by: Solar eclipse of March 27, 1941

=== Solar Saros 137 ===
- Preceded by: Solar eclipse of April 17, 1912
- Followed by: Solar eclipse of May 9, 1948

=== Inex ===
- Preceded by: Solar eclipse of May 18, 1901
- Followed by: Solar eclipse of April 8, 1959

=== Triad ===
- Preceded by: Solar eclipse of June 27, 1843
- Followed by: Solar eclipse of February 26, 2017

=== Solar eclipses of 1928–1931 ===
This eclipse is a member of a semester series. An eclipse in a semester series of solar eclipses repeats approximately every 177 days and 4 hours (a semester) at alternating nodes of the Moon's orbit.

The partial solar eclipse on June 17, 1928 occurs in the previous lunar year eclipse set, and the partial solar eclipse on September 12, 1931 occurs in the next lunar year eclipse set.

Solar eclipse series sets from 1928 to 1931
Ascending node			Descending node		
Saros	Map	Gamma	Saros	Map	Gamma
117	May 19, 1928 Total (non-central)	1.0048	122	November 12, 1928 Partial	1.0861
127	May 9, 1929 Total	−0.2887	132	November 1, 1929 Annular	0.3514
137	April 28, 1930 Hybrid	0.473	142	October 21, 1930 Total	−0.3804
147	April 18, 1931 Partial	1.2643	152	October 11, 1931 Partial	−1.0607

=== Saros 137 ===
This eclipse is a part of Saros series 137, repeating every 18 years, 11 days, and containing 70 events. The series started with a partial solar eclipse on May 25, 1389. It contains total eclipses from August 20, 1533 through December 6, 1695; the first set of hybrid eclipses from December 17, 1713 through February 11, 1804; the first set of annular eclipses from February 21, 1822 through March 25, 1876; the second set of hybrid eclipses from April 6, 1894 through April 28, 1930; and the second set of annular eclipses from May 9, 1948 through April 13, 2507. The series ends at member 70 as a partial eclipse on June 28, 2633. Its eclipses are tabulated in three columns; every third eclipse in the same column is one exeligmos apart, so they all cast shadows over approximately the same parts of the Earth.

The longest duration of totality was produced by member 11 at 2 minutes, 55 seconds on September 10, 1569, and the longest duration of annularity will be produced by member 59 at 7 minutes, 5 seconds on February 28, 2435. All eclipses in this series occur at the Moon’s ascending node of orbit.

Series members 24–46 occur between 1801 and 2200:
24	25	26
February 11, 1804	February 21, 1822	March 4, 1840
27	28	29
March 15, 1858	March 25, 1876	April 6, 1894
30	31	32
April 17, 1912	April 28, 1930	May 9, 1948
33	34	35
May 20, 1966	May 30, 1984	June 10, 2002
36	37	38
June 21, 2020	July 2, 2038	July 12, 2056
39	40	41
July 24, 2074	August 3, 2092	August 15, 2110
42	43	44
August 25, 2128	September 6, 2146	September 16, 2164
45	46	
September 27, 2182	October 9, 2200	

=== Metonic series ===
The metonic series repeats eclipses every 19 years (6939.69 days), lasting about 5 cycles. Eclipses occur in nearly the same calendar date. In addition, the octon subseries repeats 1/5 of that or every 3.8 years (1387.94 days). All eclipses in this table occur at the Moon's ascending node.

22 eclipse events between December 2, 1880 and July 9, 1964
December 2–3	September 20–21	July 9–10	April 26–28	February 13–14
111	113	115	117	119
December 2, 1880		July 9, 1888	April 26, 1892	February 13, 1896
121	123	125	127	129
December 3, 1899	September 21, 1903	July 10, 1907	April 28, 1911	February 14, 1915
131	133	135	137	139
December 3, 1918	September 21, 1922	July 9, 1926	April 28, 1930	February 14, 1934
141	143	145	147	149
December 2, 1937	September 21, 1941	July 9, 1945	April 28, 1949	February 14, 1953
151	153	155		
December 2, 1956	September 20, 1960	July 9, 1964		

=== Tritos series ===
This eclipse is a part of a tritos cycle, repeating at alternating nodes every 135 synodic months (≈ 3986.63 days, or 11 years minus 1 month). Their appearance and longitude are irregular due to a lack of synchronization with the anomalistic month (period of perigee), but groupings of 3 tritos cycles (≈ 33 years minus 3 months) come close (≈ 434.044 anomalistic months), so eclipses are similar in these groupings.

Series members between 1801 and 2200
April 4, 1810 (Saros 126)	March 4, 1821 (Saros 127)	February 1, 1832 (Saros 128)	December 31, 1842 (Saros 129)	November 30, 1853 (Saros 130)
October 30, 1864 (Saros 131)	September 29, 1875 (Saros 132)	August 29, 1886 (Saros 133)	July 29, 1897 (Saros 134)	June 28, 1908 (Saros 135)
May 29, 1919 (Saros 136)	April 28, 1930 (Saros 137)	March 27, 1941 (Saros 138)	February 25, 1952 (Saros 139)	January 25, 1963 (Saros 140)
December 24, 1973 (Saros 141)	November 22, 1984 (Saros 142)	October 24, 1995 (Saros 143)	September 22, 2006 (Saros 144)	August 21, 2017 (Saros 145)
July 22, 2028 (Saros 146)	June 21, 2039 (Saros 147)	May 20, 2050 (Saros 148)	April 20, 2061 (Saros 149)	March 19, 2072 (Saros 150)
February 16, 2083 (Saros 151)	January 16, 2094 (Saros 152)	December 17, 2104 (Saros 153)	November 16, 2115 (Saros 154)	October 16, 2126 (Saros 155)
September 15, 2137 (Saros 156)	August 14, 2148 (Saros 157)	July 15, 2159 (Saros 158)	June 14, 2170 (Saros 159)	May 13, 2181 (Saros 160)
April 12, 2192 (Saros 161)

=== Inex series ===
This eclipse is a part of the long period inex cycle, repeating at alternating nodes, every 358 synodic months (≈ 10,571.95 days, or 29 years minus 20 days). Their appearance and longitude are irregular due to a lack of synchronization with the anomalistic month (period of perigee). However, groupings of 3 inex cycles (≈ 87 years minus 2 months) comes close (≈ 1,151.02 anomalistic months), so eclipses are similar in these groupings.

Series members between 1801 and 2200
July 17, 1814 (Saros 133)	June 27, 1843 (Saros 134)	June 6, 1872 (Saros 135)
May 18, 1901 (Saros 136)	April 28, 1930 (Saros 137)	April 8, 1959 (Saros 138)
March 18, 1988 (Saros 139)	February 26, 2017 (Saros 140)	February 5, 2046 (Saros 141)
January 16, 2075 (Saros 142)	December 29, 2103 (Saros 143)	December 7, 2132 (Saros 144)
November 17, 2161 (Saros 145)	October 29, 2190 (Saros 146)	
