= Solar eclipse of June 11, 2067 =

Future annular solar eclipse

- Annular eclipse
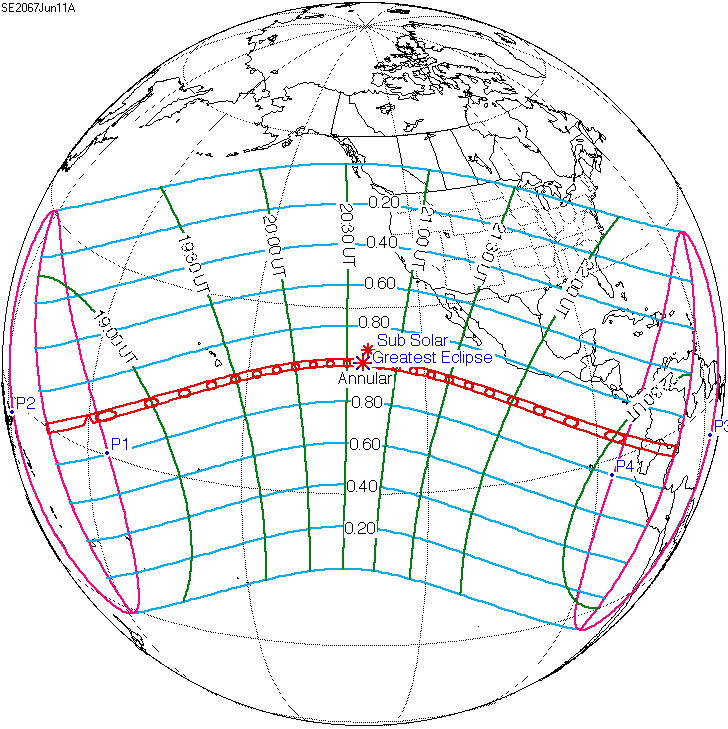
- Map
- Gamma: −0.0387
- Magnitude: 0.967

Maximum eclipse
- Duration: 245 s (4 min 5 s)
- Coordinates: 21°N 130.2°W
- Max. width of band: 119 km (74 mi)

Times (UTC)
- Greatest eclipse: 20:42:26

References
- Saros: 138 (34 of 70)
- Catalog # (SE5000): 9658

An annular solar eclipse will occur at the Moon's descending node of orbit on Saturday, June 11, 2067, with a magnitude of 0.967. A solar eclipse occurs when the Moon passes between Earth and the Sun, thereby totally or partly obscuring the image of the Sun for a viewer on Earth. An annular solar eclipse occurs when the Moon's apparent diameter is smaller than the Sun's, blocking most of the Sun's light and causing the Sun to look like an annulus (ring). An annular eclipse appears as a partial eclipse over a region of the Earth thousands of kilometres wide. Occurring about 4.3 days before apogee (on June 16, 2067, at 4:05 UTC), the Moon's apparent diameter will be smaller.

This solar eclipse is notable as it is the closest eclipse in Saros 138 to the subsolar point with an eclipse gamma of -0.0387.

The path of annularity will be visible from parts of Kiribati, Ecuador, northern Peru, extreme southern Colombia, and extreme western Brazil. A partial solar eclipse will also be visible for parts of Oceania, Hawaii, southern North America, Central America, the Caribbean, and western South America.

== Eclipse details ==
Shown below are two tables displaying details about this particular solar eclipse. The first table outlines times at which the Moon's penumbra or umbra attains the specific parameter, and the second table describes various other parameters pertaining to this eclipse.

June 11, 2067 solar eclipse times
Event	Time (UTC)
First penumbral external contact	2067 June 11 at 17:41:42.1 UTC
First umbral external contact	2067 June 11 at 18:45:02.0 UTC
First central line	2067 June 11 at 18:46:37.3 UTC
First umbral internal contact	2067 June 11 at 18:48:12.5 UTC
First penumbral internal contact	2067 June 11 at 19:51:38.7 UTC
Greatest eclipse	2067 June 11 at 20:42:26.4 UTC
Equatorial conjunction	2067 June 11 at 20:42:35.2 UTC
Ecliptic conjunction	2067 June 11 at 20:42:53.4 UTC
Greatest duration	2067 June 11 at 20:43:57.1 UTC
Last penumbral internal contact	2067 June 11 at 21:33:13.1 UTC
Last umbral internal contact	2067 June 11 at 22:36:38.6 UTC
Last central line	2067 June 11 at 22:38:16.2 UTC
Last umbral external contact	2067 June 11 at 22:39:53.8 UTC
Last penumbral external contact	2067 June 11 at 23:43:15.9 UTC

June 11, 2067 solar eclipse parameters
Parameter	Value
Eclipse magnitude	0.96702
Eclipse obscuration	0.93513
Gamma	−0.03865
Sun right ascension	05h20m58.3s
Sun declination	+23°07'36.6"
Sun semi-diameter	15'45.1"
Sun equatorial horizontal parallax	08.7"
Moon right ascension	05h20m58.0s
Moon declination	+23°05'29.3"
Moon semi-diameter	15'00.0"
Moon equatorial horizontal parallax	0°55'03.2"
ΔT	95.6 s

== Eclipse season ==
This eclipse is part of an eclipse season, a period, roughly every six months, when eclipses occur. Only two (or occasionally three) eclipse seasons occur each year, and each season lasts about 35 days and repeats just short of six months (173 days) later; thus two full eclipse seasons always occur each year. Either two or three eclipses happen each eclipse season. In the sequence below, each eclipse is separated by a fortnight. The first and last eclipse in this sequence is separated by one synodic month.

Eclipse season of May–June 2067
May 28 Ascending node (full moon)	June 11 Descending node (new moon)	June 27 Ascending node (full moon)
Penumbral lunar eclipse Lunar Saros 112	Annular solar eclipse Solar Saros 138	Penumbral lunar eclipse Lunar Saros 150

== Related eclipses ==
=== Eclipses in 2067 ===
- A penumbral lunar eclipse on May 28
- An annular solar eclipse on June 11
- A penumbral lunar eclipse on June 27
- A penumbral lunar eclipse on November 21
- A hybrid solar eclipse on December 6

=== Metonic ===
- Preceded by: Solar eclipse of August 24, 2063
- Followed by: Solar eclipse of March 31, 2071

=== Tzolkinex ===
- Preceded by: Solar eclipse of April 30, 2060
- Followed by: Solar eclipse of July 24, 2074

=== Half-Saros ===
- Preceded by: Lunar eclipse of June 6, 2058
- Followed by: Lunar eclipse of June 17, 2076

=== Tritos ===
- Preceded by: Solar eclipse of July 12, 2056
- Followed by: Solar eclipse of May 11, 2078

=== Solar Saros 138 ===
- Preceded by: Solar eclipse of May 31, 2049
- Followed by: Solar eclipse of June 22, 2085

=== Inex ===
- Preceded by: Solar eclipse of July 2, 2038
- Followed by: Solar eclipse of May 22, 2096

=== Triad ===
- Preceded by: Solar eclipse of August 10, 1980
- Followed by: Solar eclipse of April 12, 2154

=== Solar eclipses of 2065–2069 ===
This eclipse is a member of a semester series. An eclipse in a semester series of solar eclipses repeats approximately every 177 days and 4 hours (a semester) at alternating nodes of the Moon's orbit.

The partial solar eclipses on February 5, 2065 and August 2, 2065 occur in the previous lunar year eclipse set, and the partial solar eclipses on April 21, 2069 and October 15, 2069 occur in the next lunar year eclipse set.

Solar eclipse series sets from 2065 to 2069
Descending node			Ascending node		
Saros	Map	Gamma	Saros	Map	Gamma
118	July 3, 2065 Partial	1.4619	123	December 27, 2065 Partial	−1.0688
128	June 22, 2066 Annular	0.733	133	December 17, 2066 Total	−0.4043
138	June 11, 2067 Annular	−0.0387	143	December 6, 2067 Hybrid	0.2845
148	May 31, 2068 Total	−0.797	153	November 24, 2068 Partial	1.0299
158	May 20, 2069 Partial	−1.4852			

=== Saros 138 ===
This eclipse is a part of Saros series 138, repeating every 18 years, 11 days, and containing 70 events. The series started with a partial solar eclipse on June 6, 1472. It contains annular eclipses from August 31, 1598 through February 18, 2482; a hybrid eclipse on March 1, 2500; and total eclipses from March 12, 2518 through April 3, 2554. The series ends at member 70 as a partial eclipse on July 11, 2716. Its eclipses are tabulated in three columns; every third eclipse in the same column is one exeligmos apart, so they all cast shadows over approximately the same parts of the Earth.

The longest duration of annularity was produced by member 23 at 8 minutes, 2 seconds on February 11, 1869, and the longest duration of totality will be produced by member 61 at 56 seconds on April 3, 2554. All eclipses in this series occur at the Moon’s descending node of orbit.

Series members 20–41 occur between 1801 and 2200:
20	21	22
January 10, 1815	January 20, 1833	February 1, 1851
23	24	25
February 11, 1869	February 22, 1887	March 6, 1905
26	27	28
March 17, 1923	March 27, 1941	April 8, 1959
29	30	31
April 18, 1977	April 29, 1995	May 10, 2013
32	33	34
May 21, 2031	May 31, 2049	June 11, 2067
35	36	37
June 22, 2085	July 4, 2103	July 14, 2121
38	39	40
July 25, 2139	August 5, 2157	August 16, 2175
41
August 26, 2193

=== Metonic series ===
The metonic series repeats eclipses every 19 years (6939.69 days), lasting about 5 cycles. Eclipses occur in nearly the same calendar date. In addition, the octon subseries repeats 1/5 of that or every 3.8 years (1387.94 days). All eclipses in this table occur at the Moon's descending node.

22 eclipse events between June 12, 2029 and November 4, 2116
June 11–12	March 30–31	January 16	November 4–5	August 23–24
118	120	122	124	126
June 12, 2029	March 30, 2033	January 16, 2037	November 4, 2040	August 23, 2044
128	130	132	134	136
June 11, 2048	March 30, 2052	January 16, 2056	November 5, 2059	August 24, 2063
138	140	142	144	146
June 11, 2067	March 31, 2071	January 16, 2075	November 4, 2078	August 24, 2082
148	150	152	154	156
June 11, 2086	March 31, 2090	January 16, 2094	November 4, 2097	August 24, 2101
158	160	162	164	
June 12, 2105			November 4, 2116	

=== Tritos series ===
This eclipse is a part of a tritos cycle, repeating at alternating nodes every 135 synodic months (≈ 3986.63 days, or 11 years minus 1 month). Their appearance and longitude are irregular due to a lack of synchronization with the anomalistic month (period of perigee), but groupings of 3 tritos cycles (≈ 33 years minus 3 months) come close (≈ 434.044 anomalistic months), so eclipses are similar in these groupings.

Series members between 1801 and 2200
June 26, 1805 (Saros 114)	May 27, 1816 (Saros 115)	April 26, 1827 (Saros 116)	March 25, 1838 (Saros 117)	February 23, 1849 (Saros 118)
January 23, 1860 (Saros 119)	December 22, 1870 (Saros 120)	November 21, 1881 (Saros 121)	October 20, 1892 (Saros 122)	September 21, 1903 (Saros 123)
August 21, 1914 (Saros 124)	July 20, 1925 (Saros 125)	June 19, 1936 (Saros 126)	May 20, 1947 (Saros 127)	April 19, 1958 (Saros 128)
March 18, 1969 (Saros 129)	February 16, 1980 (Saros 130)	January 15, 1991 (Saros 131)	December 14, 2001 (Saros 132)	November 13, 2012 (Saros 133)
October 14, 2023 (Saros 134)	September 12, 2034 (Saros 135)	August 12, 2045 (Saros 136)	July 12, 2056 (Saros 137)	June 11, 2067 (Saros 138)
May 11, 2078 (Saros 139)	April 10, 2089 (Saros 140)	March 10, 2100 (Saros 141)	February 8, 2111 (Saros 142)	January 8, 2122 (Saros 143)
December 7, 2132 (Saros 144)	November 7, 2143 (Saros 145)	October 7, 2154 (Saros 146)	September 5, 2165 (Saros 147)	August 4, 2176 (Saros 148)
July 6, 2187 (Saros 149)	June 4, 2198 (Saros 150)			

=== Inex series ===
This eclipse is a part of the long period inex cycle, repeating at alternating nodes, every 358 synodic months (≈ 10,571.95 days, or 29 years minus 20 days). Their appearance and longitude are irregular due to a lack of synchronization with the anomalistic month (period of perigee). However, groupings of 3 inex cycles (≈ 87 years minus 2 months) comes close (≈ 1,151.02 anomalistic months), so eclipses are similar in these groupings.

Series members between 1801 and 2200
December 10, 1806 (Saros 129)	November 20, 1835 (Saros 130)	October 30, 1864 (Saros 131)
October 9, 1893 (Saros 132)	September 21, 1922 (Saros 133)	September 1, 1951 (Saros 134)
August 10, 1980 (Saros 135)	July 22, 2009 (Saros 136)	July 2, 2038 (Saros 137)
June 11, 2067 (Saros 138)	May 22, 2096 (Saros 139)	May 3, 2125 (Saros 140)
April 12, 2154 (Saros 141)	March 23, 2183 (Saros 142)	
