= Solar eclipse of January 27, 2055 =

Future partial solar eclipse

- Partial eclipse
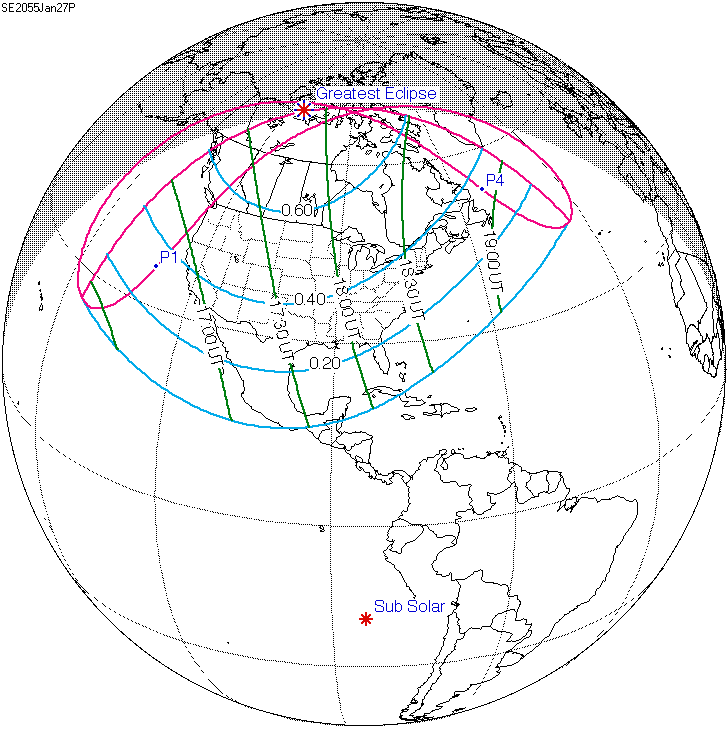
- Map
- Gamma: 1.155
- Magnitude: 0.6932

Maximum eclipse
- Coordinates: 69.5°N 112.2°W

Times (UTC)
- Greatest eclipse: 17:54:05

References
- Saros: 122 (60 of 70)
- Catalog # (SE5000): 9630

A partial solar eclipse will occur at the Moon's descending node of orbit on Wednesday, January 27, 2055, with a magnitude of 0.6932. A solar eclipse occurs when the Moon passes between Earth and the Sun, thereby totally or partly obscuring the image of the Sun for a viewer on Earth. A partial solar eclipse occurs in the polar regions of the Earth when the center of the Moon's shadow misses the Earth.

The partial solar eclipse will be visible for most of North America.

== Eclipse details ==
Shown below are two tables displaying details about this particular solar eclipse. The first table outlines times at which the Moon's penumbra or umbra attains the specific parameter, and the second table describes various other parameters pertaining to this eclipse.

January 27, 2055 Solar Eclipse Times
| Event | Time (UTC) |
|---|---|
| First Penumbral External Contact | 2055 January 27 at 15:49:08.2 UTC |
| Ecliptic Conjunction | 2055 January 27 at 17:40:43.6 UTC |
| Greatest Eclipse | 2055 January 27 at 17:54:05.3 UTC |
| Equatorial Conjunction | 2055 January 27 at 18:16:10.6 UTC |
| Last Penumbral External Contact | 2055 January 27 at 19:58:56.1 UTC |

January 27, 2055 Solar Eclipse Parameters
| Parameter | Value |
|---|---|
| Eclipse Magnitude | 0.69325 |
| Eclipse Obscuration | 0.59655 |
| Gamma | 1.15497 |
| Sun Right Ascension | 20h40m41.0s |
| Sun Declination | -18°19'18.9" |
| Sun Semi-Diameter | 16'14.5" |
| Sun Equatorial Horizontal Parallax | 08.9" |
| Moon Right Ascension | 20h39m58.6s |
| Moon Declination | -17°17'11.5" |
| Moon Semi-Diameter | 14'53.3" |
| Moon Equatorial Horizontal Parallax | 0°54'38.4" |
| ΔT | 87.2 s |

== Eclipse season ==
This eclipse is part of an eclipse season, a period, roughly every six months, when eclipses occur. Only two (or occasionally three) eclipse seasons occur each year, and each season lasts about 35 days and repeats just short of six months (173 days) later; thus two full eclipse seasons always occur each year. Either two or three eclipses happen each eclipse season. In the sequence below, each eclipse is separated by a fortnight.

Eclipse season of August–September 2055
| January 27 Descending node (new moon) | February 11 Ascending node (full moon) |
|---|---|
| Partial solar eclipse Solar Saros 122 | Total lunar eclipse Lunar Saros 134 |

== Related eclipses ==
=== Eclipses in 2055 ===
- A partial solar eclipse on January 27.
- A total lunar eclipse on February 11.
- A total solar eclipse on July 24.
- A partial lunar eclipse on August 7.

=== Metonic ===
- Preceded by: Solar eclipse of April 11, 2051
- Followed by: Solar eclipse of November 16, 2058

=== Tzolkinex ===
- Preceded by: Solar eclipse of December 16, 2047
- Followed by: Solar eclipse of March 11, 2062

=== Half-Saros ===
- Preceded by: Lunar eclipse of January 22, 2046
- Followed by: Lunar eclipse of February 2, 2064

=== Tritos ===
- Preceded by: Solar eclipse of February 28, 2044
- Followed by: Solar eclipse of December 27, 2065

=== Solar Saros 122 ===
- Preceded by: Solar eclipse of January 16, 2037
- Followed by: Solar eclipse of February 7, 2073

=== Inex ===
- Preceded by: Solar eclipse of February 17, 2026
- Followed by: Solar eclipse of January 7, 2084

=== Triad ===
- Preceded by: Solar eclipse of March 28, 1968
- Followed by: Solar eclipse of November 28, 2141

=== Solar eclipses of 2054–2058 ===
This eclipse is a member of a semester series. An eclipse in a semester series of solar eclipses repeats approximately every 177 days and 4 hours (a semester) at alternating nodes of the Moon's orbit.

The partial solar eclipses on March 9, 2054 and September 2, 2054 occur in the previous lunar year eclipse set, and the partial solar eclipses on May 22, 2058 and November 16, 2058 occur in the next lunar year eclipse set.

Solar eclipse series sets from 2054 to 2058
| Ascending node | | | Descending node | | |
| Saros | Map | Gamma | Saros | Map | Gamma |
| 117 | August 3, 2054 Partial | −1.4941 | 122 | January 27, 2055 Partial | 1.155 |
| 127 | July 24, 2055 Total | −0.8012 | 132 | January 16, 2056 Annular | 0.4199 |
| 137 | July 12, 2056 Annular | −0.0426 | 142 | January 5, 2057 Total | −0.2837 |
| 147 | July 1, 2057 Annular | 0.7455 | 152 | December 26, 2057 Total | −0.9405 |
| 157 | June 21, 2058 Partial | 1.4869 | | | |

=== Saros 122 ===
This eclipse is a part of Saros series 122, repeating every 18 years, 11 days, and containing 70 events. The series started with a partial solar eclipse on April 17, 991 AD. It contains total eclipses from July 12, 1135 through August 3, 1171; hybrid eclipses on August 13, 1189 and August 25, 1207; and annular eclipses from September 4, 1225 through October 10, 1874. The series ends at member 70 as a partial eclipse on May 17, 2235. Its eclipses are tabulated in three columns; every third eclipse in the same column is one exeligmos apart, so they all cast shadows over approximately the same parts of the Earth.

The longest duration of totality was produced by member 9 at 1 minutes, 25 seconds on July 12, 1135, and the longest duration of annularity was produced by member 50 at 6 minutes, 28 seconds on October 10, 1874. All eclipses in this series occur at the Moon’s descending node of orbit.

Series members 46–68 occur between 1801 and 2200:
| 46 | 47 | 48 |
|---|---|---|
| August 28, 1802 | September 7, 1820 | September 18, 1838 |
| 49 | 50 | 51 |
| September 29, 1856 | October 10, 1874 | October 20, 1892 |
| 52 | 53 | 54 |
| November 2, 1910 | November 12, 1928 | November 23, 1946 |
| 55 | 56 | 57 |
| December 4, 1964 | December 15, 1982 | December 25, 2000 |
| 58 | 59 | 60 |
| January 6, 2019 | January 16, 2037 | January 27, 2055 |
| 61 | 62 | 63 |
| February 7, 2073 | February 18, 2091 | March 1, 2109 |
| 64 | 65 | 66 |
| March 13, 2127 | March 23, 2145 | April 3, 2163 |
| 67 | 68 | |
| April 14, 2181 | April 25, 2199 | |

=== Metonic series ===
The metonic series repeats eclipses every 19 years (6939.69 days), lasting about 5 cycles. Eclipses occur in nearly the same calendar date. In addition, the octon subseries repeats 1/5 of that or every 3.8 years (1387.94 days). All eclipses in this table occur at the Moon's descending node.

22 eclipse events between June 23, 2047 and November 16, 2134
| June 22–23 | April 10–11 | January 27–29 | November 15–16 | September 3–5 |
| 118 | 120 | 122 | 124 | 126 |
|---|---|---|---|---|
| June 23, 2047 | April 11, 2051 | January 27, 2055 | November 16, 2058 | September 3, 2062 |
| 128 | 130 | 132 | 134 | 136 |
| June 22, 2066 | April 11, 2070 | January 27, 2074 | November 15, 2077 | September 3, 2081 |
| 138 | 140 | 142 | 144 | 146 |
| June 22, 2085 | April 10, 2089 | January 27, 2093 | November 15, 2096 | September 4, 2100 |
| 148 | 150 | 152 | 154 | 156 |
| June 22, 2104 | April 11, 2108 | January 29, 2112 | November 16, 2115 | September 5, 2119 |
| 158 | 160 | 162 | 164 | |
| June 23, 2123 | | | November 16, 2134 | |

=== Tritos series ===
This eclipse is a part of a tritos cycle, repeating at alternating nodes every 135 synodic months (≈ 3986.63 days, or 11 years minus 1 month). Their appearance and longitude are irregular due to a lack of synchronization with the anomalistic month (period of perigee), but groupings of 3 tritos cycles (≈ 33 years minus 3 months) come close (≈ 434.044 anomalistic months), so eclipses are similar in these groupings.

The partial solar eclipses on April 8, 1902 (part of Saros 108) and January 5, 1935 (part of Saros 111) are also a part of this series but are not included in the table below.

Series members between 2000 and 2200
| July 1, 2000 (Saros 117) | June 1, 2011 (Saros 118) | April 30, 2022 (Saros 119) | March 30, 2033 (Saros 120) | February 28, 2044 (Saros 121) |
| January 27, 2055 (Saros 122) | December 27, 2065 (Saros 123) | November 26, 2076 (Saros 124) | October 26, 2087 (Saros 125) | September 25, 2098 (Saros 126) |
| August 26, 2109 (Saros 127) | July 25, 2120 (Saros 128) | June 25, 2131 (Saros 129) | May 25, 2142 (Saros 130) | April 23, 2153 (Saros 131) |
| March 23, 2164 (Saros 132) | February 21, 2175 (Saros 133) | January 20, 2186 (Saros 134) | December 19, 2196 (Saros 135) | |

=== Inex series ===
This eclipse is a part of the long period inex cycle, repeating at alternating nodes, every 358 synodic months (≈ 10,571.95 days, or 29 years minus 20 days). Their appearance and longitude are irregular due to a lack of synchronization with the anomalistic month (period of perigee). However, groupings of 3 inex cycles (≈ 87 years minus 2 months) comes close (≈ 1,151.02 anomalistic months), so eclipses are similar in these groupings.

Series members between 1801 and 2200
| July 8, 1823 (Saros 114) | June 17, 1852 (Saros 115) | May 27, 1881 (Saros 116) |
| May 9, 1910 (Saros 117) | April 19, 1939 (Saros 118) | March 28, 1968 (Saros 119) |
| March 9, 1997 (Saros 120) | February 17, 2026 (Saros 121) | January 27, 2055 (Saros 122) |
| January 7, 2084 (Saros 123) | December 19, 2112 (Saros 124) | November 28, 2141 (Saros 125) |
| November 8, 2170 (Saros 126) | October 19, 2199 (Saros 127) | |
