= Solar eclipse of April 21, 2069 =

Future partial solar eclipse

- Partial eclipse
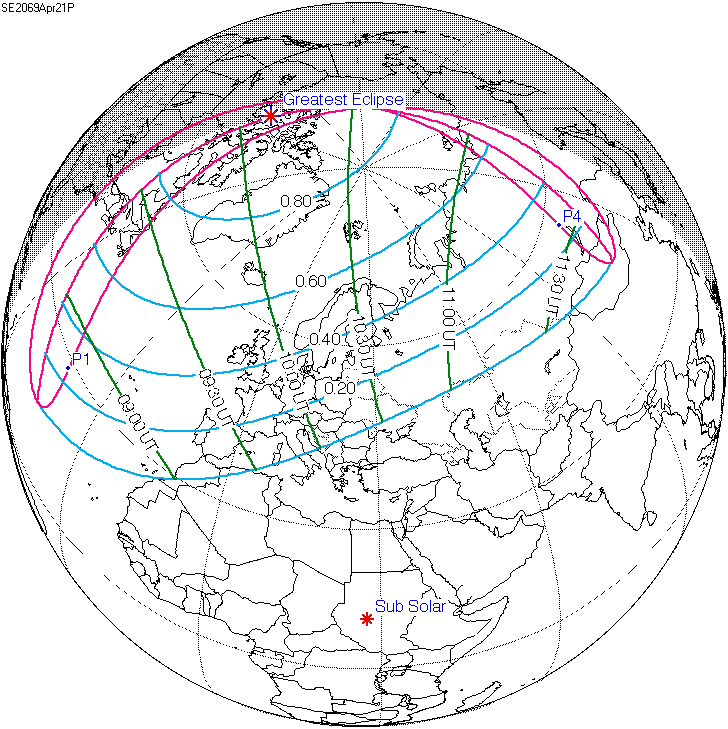
- Map
- Gamma: 1.0624
- Magnitude: 0.8992

Maximum eclipse
- Coordinates: 71°N 101.3°W

Times (UTC)
- Greatest eclipse: 10:11:09

References
- Saros: 120 (64 of 71)
- Catalog # (SE5000): 9663

A partial solar eclipse will occur at the Moon's descending node of orbit on Sunday, April 21, 2069, with a magnitude of 0.8992. A solar eclipse occurs when the Moon passes between Earth and the Sun, thereby totally or partly obscuring the image of the Sun for a viewer on Earth. A partial solar eclipse occurs in the polar regions of the Earth when the center of the Moon's shadow misses the Earth.

The partial solar eclipse will be visible for parts of eastern Canada, Greenland, Europe, and North Asia.

== Eclipse details ==
Shown below are two tables displaying details about this particular solar eclipse. The first table outlines times at which the Moon's penumbra or umbra attains the specific parameter, and the second table describes various other parameters pertaining to this eclipse.

April 21, 2069 Solar Eclipse Times
Event	Time (UTC)
First Penumbral External Contact	2069 April 21 at 08:17:35.0 UTC
Ecliptic Conjunction	2069 April 21 at 10:00:35.3 UTC
Greatest Eclipse	2069 April 21 at 10:11:08.9 UTC
Equatorial Conjunction	2069 April 21 at 10:39:45.2 UTC
Last Penumbral External Contact	2069 April 21 at 12:04:30.0 UTC

April 21, 2069 Solar Eclipse Parameters
Parameter	Value
Eclipse Magnitude	0.89916
Eclipse Obscuration	0.88412
Gamma	1.06241
Sun Right Ascension	01h58m57.2s
Sun Declination	+12°07'52.1"
Sun Semi-Diameter	15'55.0"
Sun Equatorial Horizontal Parallax	08.8"
Moon Right Ascension	01h57m49.5s
Moon Declination	+13°10'46.5"
Moon Semi-Diameter	16'43.2"
Moon Equatorial Horizontal Parallax	1°01'21.7"
ΔT	97.0 s

== Eclipse season ==
This eclipse is part of an eclipse season, a period, roughly every six months, when eclipses occur. Only two (or occasionally three) eclipse seasons occur each year, and each season lasts about 35 days and repeats just short of six months (173 days) later; thus two full eclipse seasons always occur each year. Either two or three eclipses happen each eclipse season. In the sequence below, each eclipse is separated by a fortnight. The first and last eclipse in this sequence is separated by one synodic month.

Eclipse season of April–May 2069
April 21 Descending node (new moon)	May 6 Ascending node (full moon)	May 20 Descending node (new moon)
Partial solar eclipse Solar Saros 120	Total lunar eclipse Lunar Saros 132	Partial solar eclipse Solar Saros 158

== Related eclipses ==
=== Eclipses in 2069 ===
- A partial solar eclipse on April 21.
- A total lunar eclipse on May 6.
- A partial solar eclipse on May 20.
- A partial solar eclipse on October 15.
- A total lunar eclipse on October 30.

=== Metonic ===
- Preceded by: Solar eclipse of July 3, 2065
- Followed by: Solar eclipse of February 7, 2073

=== Tzolkinex ===
- Preceded by: Solar eclipse of March 11, 2062
- Followed by: Solar eclipse of June 1, 2076

=== Half-Saros ===
- Preceded by: Lunar eclipse of April 15, 2060
- Followed by: Lunar eclipse of April 27, 2078

=== Tritos ===
- Preceded by: Solar eclipse of May 22, 2058
- Followed by: Solar eclipse of March 21, 2080

=== Solar Saros 120 ===
- Preceded by: Solar eclipse of April 11, 2051
- Followed by: Solar eclipse of May 2, 2087

=== Inex ===
- Preceded by: Solar eclipse of May 11, 2040
- Followed by: Solar eclipse of April 1, 2098

=== Triad ===
- Preceded by: Solar eclipse of June 21, 1982
- Followed by: Solar eclipse of February 21, 2156

=== Solar eclipses of 2069–2072 ===
This eclipse is a member of a semester series. An eclipse in a semester series of solar eclipses repeats approximately every 177 days and 4 hours (a semester) at alternating nodes of the Moon's orbit.

The partial solar eclipse on May 20, 2069 occurs in the previous lunar year eclipse set.

Solar eclipse series sets from 2069 to 2072
Descending node			Ascending node		
Saros	Map	Gamma	Saros	Map	Gamma
120	April 21, 2069 Partial	1.0624	125	October 15, 2069 Partial	−1.2524
130	April 11, 2070 Total	0.3652	135	October 4, 2070 Annular	−0.495
140	March 31, 2071 Annular	−0.3739	145	September 23, 2071 Total	0.262
150	March 19, 2072 Partial	−1.1405	155	September 12, 2072 Total	0.9655

=== Saros 120 ===
This eclipse is a part of Saros series 120, repeating every 18 years, 11 days, and containing 71 events. The series started with a partial solar eclipse on May 27, 933 AD. It contains annular eclipses from August 11, 1059 through April 26, 1492; hybrid eclipses from May 8, 1510 through June 8, 1564; and total eclipses from June 20, 1582 through March 30, 2033. The series ends at member 71 as a partial eclipse on July 7, 2195. Its eclipses are tabulated in three columns; every third eclipse in the same column is one exeligmos apart, so they all cast shadows over approximately the same parts of the Earth.

The longest duration of annularity was produced by member 11 at 6 minutes, 24 seconds on September 11, 1113, and the longest duration of totality was produced by member 60 at 2 minutes, 50 seconds on March 9, 1997. All eclipses in this series occur at the Moon’s descending node of orbit.

Series members 50–71 occur between 1801 and 2195:
50	51	52
November 19, 1816	November 30, 1834	December 11, 1852
53	54	55
December 22, 1870	January 1, 1889	January 14, 1907
56	57	58
January 24, 1925	February 4, 1943	February 15, 1961
59	60	61
February 26, 1979	March 9, 1997	March 20, 2015
62	63	64
March 30, 2033	April 11, 2051	April 21, 2069
65	66	67
May 2, 2087	May 14, 2105	May 25, 2123
68	69	70
June 4, 2141	June 16, 2159	June 26, 2177
71
July 7, 2195

=== Metonic series ===
The metonic series repeats eclipses every 19 years (6939.69 days), lasting about 5 cycles. Eclipses occur in nearly the same calendar date. In addition, the octon subseries repeats 1/5 of that or every 3.8 years (1387.94 days). All eclipses in this table occur at the Moon's descending node.

22 eclipse events between July 3, 2065 and November 26, 2152
July 3–4	April 21–23	February 7–8	November 26–27	September 13–15
118	120	122	124	126
July 3, 2065	April 21, 2069	February 7, 2073	November 26, 2076	September 13, 2080
128	130	132	134	136
July 3, 2084	April 21, 2088	February 7, 2092	November 27, 2095	September 14, 2099
138	140	142	144	146
July 4, 2103	April 23, 2107	February 8, 2111	November 27, 2114	September 15, 2118
148	150	152	154	156
July 4, 2122	April 22, 2126	February 8, 2130	November 26, 2133	September 15, 2137
158	160	162	164	
July 3, 2141			November 26, 2152	

=== Tritos series ===
This eclipse is a part of a tritos cycle, repeating at alternating nodes every 135 synodic months (≈ 3986.63 days, or 11 years minus 1 month). Their appearance and longitude are irregular due to a lack of synchronization with the anomalistic month (period of perigee), but groupings of 3 tritos cycles (≈ 33 years minus 3 months) come close (≈ 434.044 anomalistic months), so eclipses are similar in these groupings.

Series members between 2036 and 2200
July 23, 2036 (Saros 117)	June 23, 2047 (Saros 118)	May 22, 2058 (Saros 119)	April 21, 2069 (Saros 120)	March 21, 2080 (Saros 121)
February 18, 2091 (Saros 122)	January 19, 2102 (Saros 123)	December 19, 2112 (Saros 124)	November 18, 2123 (Saros 125)	October 17, 2134 (Saros 126)
September 16, 2145 (Saros 127)	August 16, 2156 (Saros 128)	July 16, 2167 (Saros 129)	June 16, 2178 (Saros 130)	May 15, 2189 (Saros 131)
April 14, 2200 (Saros 132)

=== Inex series ===
This eclipse is a part of the long period inex cycle, repeating at alternating nodes, every 358 synodic months (≈ 10,571.95 days, or 29 years minus 20 days). Their appearance and longitude are irregular due to a lack of synchronization with the anomalistic month (period of perigee). However, groupings of 3 inex cycles (≈ 87 years minus 2 months) comes close (≈ 1,151.02 anomalistic months), so eclipses are similar in these groupings.

Series members between 1801 and 2200
October 19, 1808 (Saros 111)		
August 20, 1895 (Saros 114)	July 31, 1924 (Saros 115)	July 11, 1953 (Saros 116)
June 21, 1982 (Saros 117)	June 1, 2011 (Saros 118)	May 11, 2040 (Saros 119)
April 21, 2069 (Saros 120)	April 1, 2098 (Saros 121)	March 13, 2127 (Saros 122)
February 21, 2156 (Saros 123)	January 31, 2185 (Saros 124)	
