= Solar eclipse of April 11, 2051 =

Future partial solar eclipse

- Partial eclipse
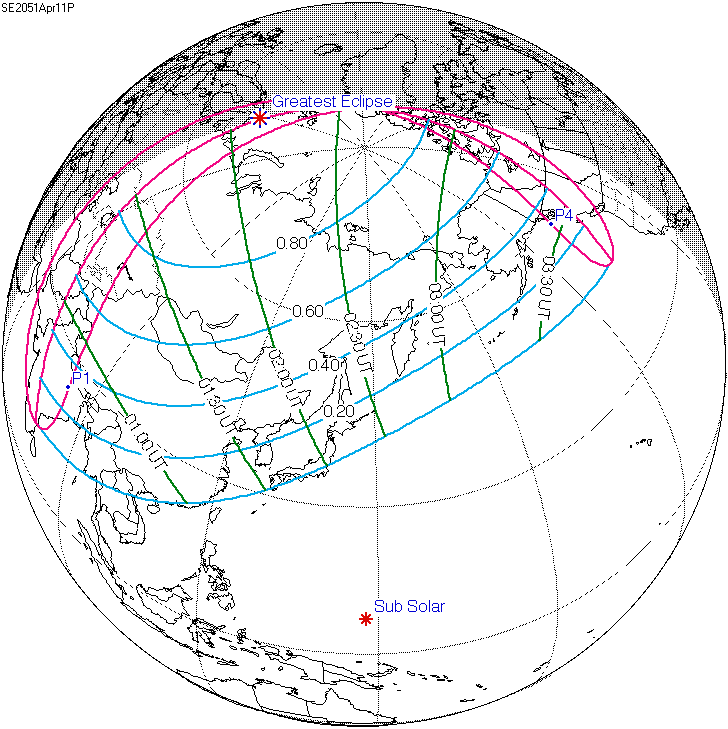
- Map
- Gamma: 1.0169
- Magnitude: 0.9849

Maximum eclipse
- Coordinates: 71.6°N 32.2°E

Times (UTC)
- Greatest eclipse: 2:10:39

References
- Saros: 120 (63 of 71)
- Catalog # (SE5000): 9621

A partial solar eclipse will occur at the Moon's descending node of orbit on Tuesday, April 11, 2051, with a magnitude of 0.9849. A solar eclipse occurs when the Moon passes between Earth and the Sun, thereby totally or partly obscuring the image of the Sun for a viewer on Earth. A partial solar eclipse occurs in the polar regions of the Earth when the center of the Moon's shadow misses the Earth.

The umbral shadow of the Moon will pass just above the North Pole. It will be the largest partial solar eclipse in 21st century.

The maximal phase of the partial eclipse (0.98) will be recorded in the Barents Sea. The partial solar eclipse will be visible for parts of Asia, Alaska, and western Canada.

== Eclipse details ==
Shown below are two tables displaying details about this particular solar eclipse. The first table outlines times at which the Moon's penumbra or umbra attains the specific parameter, and the second table describes various other parameters pertaining to this eclipse.

April 11, 2051 Solar Eclipse Times
Event	Time (UTC)
First Penumbral External Contact	2051 April 11 at 00:12:31.3 UTC
Ecliptic Conjunction	2051 April 11 at 02:00:30.3 UTC
Greatest Eclipse	2051 April 11 at 02:10:38.6 UTC
Equatorial Conjunction	2051 April 11 at 02:41:35.1 UTC
Last Penumbral External Contact	2051 April 11 at 04:08:32.1 UTC

April 11, 2051 Solar Eclipse Parameters
Parameter	Value
Eclipse Magnitude	0.98490
Eclipse Obscuration	0.98811
Gamma	1.01694
Sun Right Ascension	01h18m13.3s
Sun Declination	+08°15'12.8"
Sun Semi-Diameter	15'57.8"
Sun Equatorial Horizontal Parallax	08.8"
Moon Right Ascension	01h17m01.7s
Moon Declination	+09°14'52.8"
Moon Semi-Diameter	16'42.8"
Moon Equatorial Horizontal Parallax	1°01'20.2"
ΔT	84.9 s

== Eclipse season ==
This eclipse is part of an eclipse season, a period, roughly every six months, when eclipses occur. Only two (or occasionally three) eclipse seasons occur each year, and each season lasts about 35 days and repeats just short of six months (173 days) later; thus two full eclipse seasons always occur each year. Either two or three eclipses happen each eclipse season. In the sequence below, each eclipse is separated by a fortnight.

Eclipse season of April 2051
April 11 Descending node (new moon)	April 26 Ascending node (full moon)
Partial solar eclipse Solar Saros 120	Total lunar eclipse Lunar Saros 132

== Related eclipses ==
=== Eclipses in 2051 ===
- A partial solar eclipse on April 11.
- A total lunar eclipse on April 26.
- A partial solar eclipse on October 4.
- A total lunar eclipse on October 19.

=== Metonic ===
- Preceded by: Solar eclipse of June 23, 2047
- Followed by: Solar eclipse of January 27, 2055

=== Tzolkinex ===
- Preceded by: Solar eclipse of February 28, 2044
- Followed by: Solar eclipse of May 22, 2058

=== Half-Saros ===
- Preceded by: Lunar eclipse of April 5, 2042
- Followed by: Lunar eclipse of April 15, 2060

=== Tritos ===
- Preceded by: Solar eclipse of May 11, 2040
- Followed by: Solar eclipse of March 11, 2062

=== Solar Saros 120 ===
- Preceded by: Solar eclipse of March 30, 2033
- Followed by: Solar eclipse of April 21, 2069

=== Inex ===
- Preceded by: Solar eclipse of April 30, 2022
- Followed by: Solar eclipse of March 21, 2080

=== Triad ===
- Preceded by: Solar eclipse of June 10, 1964
- Followed by: Solar eclipse of February 9, 2138

=== Solar eclipses of 2051–2054 ===
This eclipse is a member of a semester series. An eclipse in a semester series of solar eclipses repeats approximately every 177 days and 4 hours (a semester) at alternating nodes of the Moon's orbit.

The partial solar eclipse on August 3, 2054 occurs in the next lunar year eclipse set.

Solar eclipse series sets from 2051 to 2054
Descending node			Ascending node		
Saros	Map	Gamma	Saros	Map	Gamma
120	April 11, 2051 Partial	1.0169	125	October 4, 2051 Partial	−1.2094
130	March 30, 2052 Total	0.3238	135	September 22, 2052 Annular	−0.448
140	March 20, 2053 Annular	−0.4089	145	September 12, 2053 Total	0.314
150	March 9, 2054 Partial	−1.1711	155	September 2, 2054 Partial	1.0215

=== Saros 120 ===
This eclipse is a part of Saros series 120, repeating every 18 years, 11 days, and containing 71 events. The series started with a partial solar eclipse on May 27, 933 AD. It contains annular eclipses from August 11, 1059 through April 26, 1492; hybrid eclipses from May 8, 1510 through June 8, 1564; and total eclipses from June 20, 1582 through March 30, 2033. The series ends at member 71 as a partial eclipse on July 7, 2195. Its eclipses are tabulated in three columns; every third eclipse in the same column is one exeligmos apart, so they all cast shadows over approximately the same parts of the Earth.

The longest duration of annularity was produced by member 11 at 6 minutes, 24 seconds on September 11, 1113, and the longest duration of totality was produced by member 60 at 2 minutes, 50 seconds on March 9, 1997. All eclipses in this series occur at the Moon’s descending node of orbit.

Series members 50–71 occur between 1801 and 2195:
50	51	52
November 19, 1816	November 30, 1834	December 11, 1852
53	54	55
December 22, 1870	January 1, 1889	January 14, 1907
56	57	58
January 24, 1925	February 4, 1943	February 15, 1961
59	60	61
February 26, 1979	March 9, 1997	March 20, 2015
62	63	64
March 30, 2033	April 11, 2051	April 21, 2069
65	66	67
May 2, 2087	May 14, 2105	May 25, 2123
68	69	70
June 4, 2141	June 16, 2159	June 26, 2177
71
July 7, 2195

=== Metonic series ===
The metonic series repeats eclipses every 19 years (6939.69 days), lasting about 5 cycles. Eclipses occur in nearly the same calendar date. In addition, the octon subseries repeats 1/5 of that or every 3.8 years (1387.94 days). All eclipses in this table occur at the Moon's descending node.

22 eclipse events between June 23, 2047 and November 16, 2134
June 22–23	April 10–11	January 27–29	November 15–16	September 3–5
118	120	122	124	126
June 23, 2047	April 11, 2051	January 27, 2055	November 16, 2058	September 3, 2062
128	130	132	134	136
June 22, 2066	April 11, 2070	January 27, 2074	November 15, 2077	September 3, 2081
138	140	142	144	146
June 22, 2085	April 10, 2089	January 27, 2093	November 15, 2096	September 4, 2100
148	150	152	154	156
June 22, 2104	April 11, 2108	January 29, 2112	November 16, 2115	September 5, 2119
158	160	162	164	
June 23, 2123			November 16, 2134	

=== Tritos series ===
This eclipse is a part of a tritos cycle, repeating at alternating nodes every 135 synodic months (≈ 3986.63 days, or 11 years minus 1 month). Their appearance and longitude are irregular due to a lack of synchronization with the anomalistic month (period of perigee), but groupings of 3 tritos cycles (≈ 33 years minus 3 months) come close (≈ 434.044 anomalistic months), so eclipses are similar in these groupings.

Series members between 2018 and 2200
July 13, 2018 (Saros 117)	June 12, 2029 (Saros 118)	May 11, 2040 (Saros 119)	April 11, 2051 (Saros 120)	March 11, 2062 (Saros 121)
February 7, 2073 (Saros 122)	January 7, 2084 (Saros 123)	December 7, 2094 (Saros 124)	November 6, 2105 (Saros 125)	October 6, 2116 (Saros 126)
September 6, 2127 (Saros 127)	August 5, 2138 (Saros 128)	July 5, 2149 (Saros 129)	June 4, 2160 (Saros 130)	May 5, 2171 (Saros 131)
April 3, 2182 (Saros 132)	March 3, 2193 (Saros 133)			

=== Inex series ===
This eclipse is a part of the long period inex cycle, repeating at alternating nodes, every 358 synodic months (≈ 10,571.95 days, or 29 years minus 20 days). Their appearance and longitude are irregular due to a lack of synchronization with the anomalistic month (period of perigee). However, groupings of 3 inex cycles (≈ 87 years minus 2 months) comes close (≈ 1,151.02 anomalistic months), so eclipses are similar in these groupings.

Series members between 1801 and 2200
September 19, 1819 (Saros 112)	August 28, 1848 (Saros 113)	August 9, 1877 (Saros 114)
July 21, 1906 (Saros 115)	June 30, 1935 (Saros 116)	June 10, 1964 (Saros 117)
May 21, 1993 (Saros 118)	April 30, 2022 (Saros 119)	April 11, 2051 (Saros 120)
March 21, 2080 (Saros 121)	March 1, 2109 (Saros 122)	February 9, 2138 (Saros 123)
January 21, 2167 (Saros 124)	December 31, 2195 (Saros 125)	
