= Solar eclipse of May 11, 2040 =

Future partial solar eclipse

- Partial eclipse
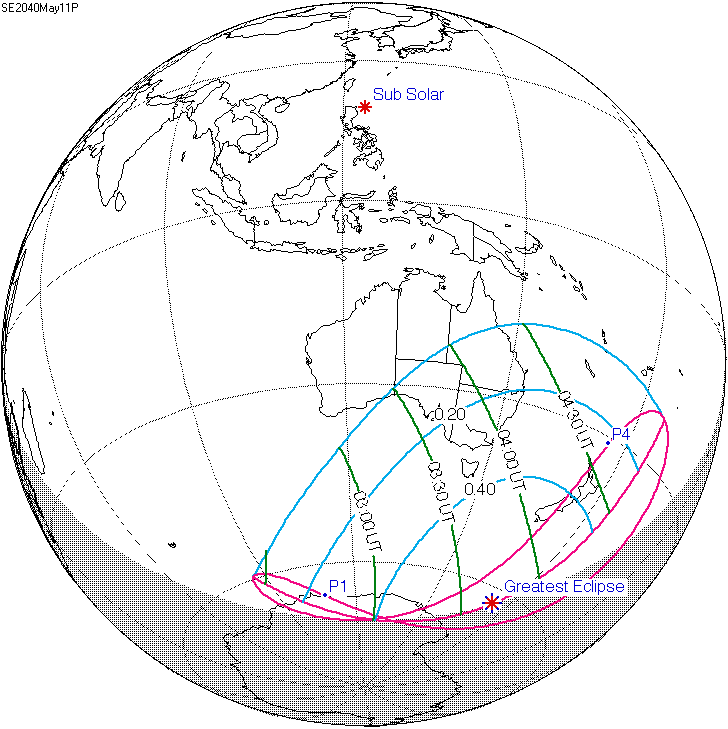
- Map
- Gamma: −1.2529
- Magnitude: 0.5306

Maximum eclipse
- Coordinates: 62.8°S 174.4°E

Times (UTC)
- Greatest eclipse: 3:43:02

References
- Saros: 119 (67 of 71)
- Catalog # (SE5000): 9597

A partial solar eclipse will occur at the Moon's ascending node of orbit on Friday, May 11, 2040, with a magnitude of 0.5306. A solar eclipse occurs when the Moon passes between Earth and the Sun, thereby totally or partly obscuring the image of the Sun for a viewer on Earth. A partial solar eclipse occurs in the polar regions of the Earth when the center of the Moon's shadow misses the Earth.

A partial eclipse will be visible for parts of Australia, New Zealand, Oceania, and Antarctica.

== Images ==
Animated path

== Eclipse timing ==
=== Places experiencing partial eclipse ===
Solar Eclipse of May 11, 2040 (Local Times)
Country or territory	City or place	Start of partial eclipse	Maximum eclipse	End of partial eclipse	Duration of eclipse (hr:min)	Maximum coverage
Antarctica	Casey Station	09:55:37	10:47:24	11:40:31	1:45	15.99%
Antarctica	Dumont d'Urville Station	12:04:57	13:10:24	14:15:47	2:11	32.46%
Australia	Eucla	11:55:59	12:14:20	12:32:45	0:37	0.25%
Australia	Adelaide	12:13:39	13:11:42	14:08:51	1:55	9.51%
Australia	Hobart	12:31:41	13:44:11	14:53:58	2:22	24.23%
Australia	Melbourne	12:39:55	13:48:08	14:53:55	2:14	17.44%
Australia	Traralgon	12:40:35	13:50:08	14:56:51	2:16	18.94%
Australia	Broken Hill	12:24:29	13:21:31	14:16:57	1:52	8.63%
Australia	Canberra	12:50:48	13:59:07	15:03:48	2:13	17.30%
Australia	Bowral	12:54:34	14:02:32	15:06:35	2:12	17.06%
Australia	Kiama	12:54:34	14:02:55	15:07:13	2:13	17.51%
Australia	Wollongong	12:55:18	14:03:23	15:07:26	2:12	17.23%
Australia	Mudgee	12:59:04	14:04:20	15:05:56	2:07	14.40%
Australia	Canterbury	12:57:02	14:04:36	15:08:05	2:11	16.73%
Australia	Sydney	12:57:17	14:04:50	15:08:16	2:11	16.72%
Australia	Tamworth	13:05:24	14:09:02	15:08:46	2:03	13.24%
New Zealand	Christchurch	15:05:34	16:15:16	17:18:47 (sunset)	2:13	31.08%
Australia	Samford	13:21:06	14:18:19	15:11:48	1:51	9.40%
Australia	Brisbane	13:20:54	14:18:22	15:12:04	1:51	9.56%
Australia	Lord Howe Island	13:45:35	14:50:28	15:50:05	2:05	16.27%
New Zealand	Wellington	15:13:59	16:21:09	17:15:37 (sunset)	2:02	28.06%
New Zealand	Chatham Islands	16:03:56	17:07:20	17:19:15 (sunset)	1:15	28.61%
New Zealand	Palmerston North	15:17:32	16:23:28	17:14:26 (sunset)	1:57	26.69%
Australia	Lindeman Island	13:54:32	14:23:31	14:51:31	0:57	1.07%
New Zealand	Hamilton	15:23:47	16:27:40	17:21:18 (sunset)	1:58	23.41%
New Zealand	Tauranga	15:25:24	16:28:32	17:17:58 (sunset)	1:53	23.00%
New Zealand	Auckland	15:25:34	16:28:50	17:25:18 (sunset)	2:00	22.27%
Norfolk Island	Kingston	14:38:38	15:35:15	16:26:55	1:48	12.73%
New Caledonia	Nouméa	15:04:30	15:43:48	16:20:30	1:16	3.97%
Vanuatu	Port Vila	15:46:25	15:51:35	15:56:41	0:10	0.01%

== Eclipse details ==
Shown below are two tables displaying details about this particular solar eclipse. The first table outlines times at which the Moon's penumbra or umbra attains the specific parameter, and the second table describes various other parameters pertaining to this eclipse.

May 11, 2040 Solar Eclipse Times
Event	Time (UTC)
First Penumbral External Contact	2040 May 11 at 01:56:45.3 UTC
Equatorial Conjunction	2040 May 11 at 02:48:21.3 UTC
Ecliptic Conjunction	2040 May 11 at 03:29:05.2 UTC
Greatest Eclipse	2040 May 11 at 03:43:02.1 UTC
Last Penumbral External Contact	2040 May 11 at 05:29:45.8 UTC

May 11, 2040 Solar Eclipse Parameters
Parameter	Value
Eclipse Magnitude	0.53064
Eclipse Obscuration	0.41890
Gamma	−1.25291
Sun Right Ascension	03h14m33.6s
Sun Declination	+18°01'19.7"
Sun Semi-Diameter	15'50.1"
Sun Equatorial Horizontal Parallax	08.7"
Moon Right Ascension	03h16m16.3s
Moon Declination	+16°56'30.8"
Moon Semi-Diameter	15'06.4"
Moon Equatorial Horizontal Parallax	0°55'26.7"
ΔT	78.8 s

== Eclipse season ==
This eclipse is part of an eclipse season, a period, roughly every six months, when eclipses occur. Only two (or occasionally three) eclipse seasons occur each year, and each season lasts about 35 days and repeats just short of six months (173 days) later; thus two full eclipse seasons always occur each year. Either two or three eclipses happen each eclipse season. In the sequence below, each eclipse is separated by a fortnight.

Eclipse season of May 2040
May 11 Ascending node (new moon)	May 26 Descending node (full moon)
Partial solar eclipse Solar Saros 119	Total lunar eclipse Lunar Saros 131

== Related eclipses ==
=== Eclipses in 2040 ===
- A partial solar eclipse on May 11.
- A total lunar eclipse on May 26.
- A partial solar eclipse on November 4.
- A total lunar eclipse on November 18.

=== Metonic ===
- Preceded by: Solar eclipse of July 23, 2036
- Followed by: Solar eclipse of February 28, 2044

=== Tzolkinex ===
- Preceded by: Solar eclipse of March 30, 2033
- Followed by: Solar eclipse of June 23, 2047

=== Half-Saros ===
- Preceded by: Lunar eclipse of May 7, 2031
- Followed by: Lunar eclipse of May 17, 2049

=== Tritos ===
- Preceded by: Solar eclipse of June 12, 2029
- Followed by: Solar eclipse of April 11, 2051

=== Solar Saros 119 ===
- Preceded by: Solar eclipse of April 30, 2022
- Followed by: Solar eclipse of May 22, 2058

=== Inex ===
- Preceded by: Solar eclipse of June 1, 2011
- Followed by: Solar eclipse of April 21, 2069

=== Triad ===
- Preceded by: Solar eclipse of July 11, 1953
- Followed by: Solar eclipse of March 13, 2127

=== Solar eclipses of 2040–2043 ===
This eclipse is a member of a semester series. An eclipse in a semester series of solar eclipses repeats approximately every 177 days and 4 hours (a semester) at alternating nodes of the Moon's orbit.

Solar eclipse series sets from 2040 to 2043
Ascending node			Descending node		
Saros	Map	Gamma	Saros	Map	Gamma
119	May 11, 2040 Partial	−1.2529	124	November 4, 2040 Partial	1.0993
129	April 30, 2041 Total	−0.4492	134	October 25, 2041 Annular	0.4133
139	April 20, 2042 Total	0.2956	144	October 14, 2042 Annular	−0.303
149	April 9, 2043 Total (non-central)	1.0031	154	October 3, 2043 Annular (non-central)	1.0102

=== Saros 119 ===
This eclipse is a part of Saros series 119, repeating every 18 years, 11 days, and containing 71 events. The series started with a partial solar eclipse on May 15, 850 AD. It contains total eclipses on August 9, 994 AD and August 20, 1012; a hybrid eclipse on August 31, 1030; and annular eclipses from September 10, 1048 through March 18, 1950. The series ends at member 71 as a partial eclipse on June 24, 2112. Its eclipses are tabulated in three columns; every third eclipse in the same column is one exeligmos apart, so they all cast shadows over approximately the same parts of the Earth.

The longest duration of totality was produced by member 10 at 32 seconds on August 20, 1012, and the longest duration of annularity was produced by member 44 at 7 minutes, 37 seconds on September 1, 1625. All eclipses in this series occur at the Moon’s ascending node of orbit.

Series members 54–71 occur between 1801 and 2112:
54	55	56
December 21, 1805	January 1, 1824	January 11, 1842
57	58	59
January 23, 1860	February 2, 1878	February 13, 1896
60	61	62
February 25, 1914	March 7, 1932	March 18, 1950
63	64	65
March 28, 1968	April 9, 1986	April 19, 2004
66	67	68
April 30, 2022	May 11, 2040	May 22, 2058
69	70	71
June 1, 2076	June 13, 2094	June 24, 2112

=== Metonic series ===
The metonic series repeats eclipses every 19 years (6939.69 days), lasting about 5 cycles. Eclipses occur in nearly the same calendar date. In addition, the octon subseries repeats 1/5 of that or every 3.8 years (1387.94 days). All eclipses in this table occur at the Moon's ascending node.

21 eclipse events between July 23, 2036 and July 23, 2112
July 23–24	May 11	February 27–28	December 16–17	October 4–5
117	119	121	123	125
July 23, 2036	May 11, 2040	February 28, 2044	December 16, 2047	October 4, 2051
127	129	131	133	135
July 24, 2055	May 11, 2059	February 28, 2063	December 17, 2066	October 4, 2070
137	139	141	143	145
July 24, 2074	May 11, 2078	February 27, 2082	December 16, 2085	October 4, 2089
147	149	151	153	155
July 23, 2093	May 11, 2097	February 28, 2101	December 17, 2104	October 5, 2108
157
July 23, 2112

=== Tritos series ===
This eclipse is a part of a tritos cycle, repeating at alternating nodes every 135 synodic months (≈ 3986.63 days, or 11 years minus 1 month). Their appearance and longitude are irregular due to a lack of synchronization with the anomalistic month (period of perigee), but groupings of 3 tritos cycles (≈ 33 years minus 3 months) come close (≈ 434.044 anomalistic months), so eclipses are similar in these groupings.

Series members between 2018 and 2200
July 13, 2018 (Saros 117)	June 12, 2029 (Saros 118)	May 11, 2040 (Saros 119)	April 11, 2051 (Saros 120)	March 11, 2062 (Saros 121)
February 7, 2073 (Saros 122)	January 7, 2084 (Saros 123)	December 7, 2094 (Saros 124)	November 6, 2105 (Saros 125)	October 6, 2116 (Saros 126)
September 6, 2127 (Saros 127)	August 5, 2138 (Saros 128)	July 5, 2149 (Saros 129)	June 4, 2160 (Saros 130)	May 5, 2171 (Saros 131)
April 3, 2182 (Saros 132)	March 3, 2193 (Saros 133)			

=== Inex series ===
This eclipse is a part of the long period inex cycle, repeating at alternating nodes, every 358 synodic months (≈ 10,571.95 days, or 29 years minus 20 days). Their appearance and longitude are irregular due to a lack of synchronization with the anomalistic month (period of perigee). However, groupings of 3 inex cycles (≈ 87 years minus 2 months) comes close (≈ 1,151.02 anomalistic months), so eclipses are similar in these groupings.

Series members between 1801 and 2200
October 19, 1808 (Saros 111)		
August 20, 1895 (Saros 114)	July 31, 1924 (Saros 115)	July 11, 1953 (Saros 116)
June 21, 1982 (Saros 117)	June 1, 2011 (Saros 118)	May 11, 2040 (Saros 119)
April 21, 2069 (Saros 120)	April 1, 2098 (Saros 121)	March 13, 2127 (Saros 122)
February 21, 2156 (Saros 123)	January 31, 2185 (Saros 124)	
