= Solar eclipse of January 27, 2093 =

Total eclipse

- Total eclipse
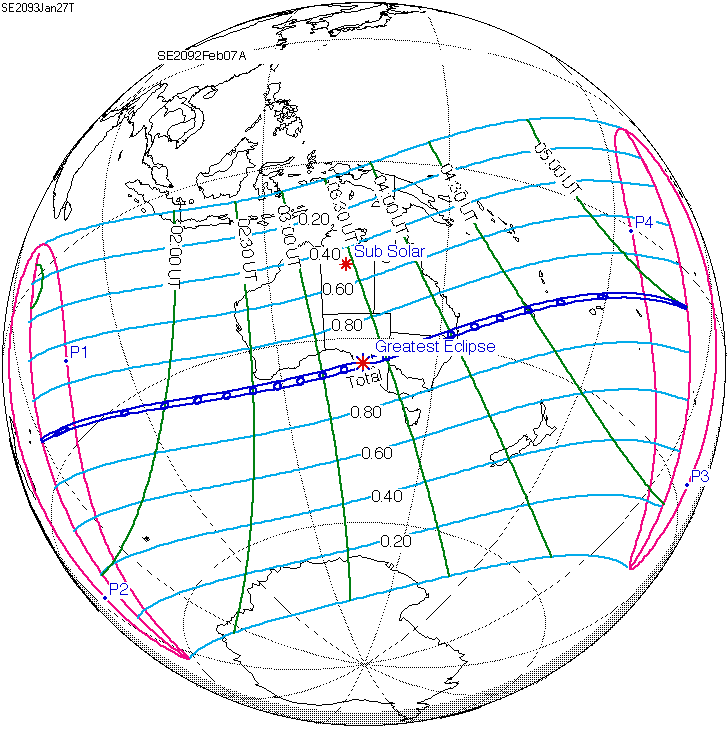
- Map
- Gamma: −0.2737
- Magnitude: 1.034

Maximum eclipse
- Duration: 178 s (2 min 58 s)
- Coordinates: 34.1°S 136.4°E
- Max. width of band: 119 km (74 mi)

Times (UTC)
- Greatest eclipse: 3:22:16

References
- Saros: 142 (27 of 72)
- Catalog # (SE5000): 9716

A total solar eclipse will occur at the Moon's descending node of orbit on Tuesday, January 27, 2093, with a magnitude of 1.034. A solar eclipse occurs when the Moon passes between Earth and the Sun, thereby totally or partly obscuring the image of the Sun for a viewer on Earth. A total solar eclipse occurs when the Moon's apparent diameter is larger than the Sun's, blocking all direct sunlight, turning day into darkness. Totality occurs in a narrow path across Earth's surface, with the partial solar eclipse visible over a surrounding region thousands of kilometres wide. Occurring about 1.3 days after perigee (on January 25, 2093, at 18:45 UTC), the Moon's apparent diameter will be larger.

The path of totality will be visible from parts of Australia, New Caledonia, and Vanuatu. A partial solar eclipse will also be visible for parts of Antarctica, Australia, Indonesia, and Oceania.

== Eclipse details ==
Shown below are two tables displaying details about this particular solar eclipse. The first table outlines times at which the Moon's penumbra or umbra attains the specific parameter, and the second table describes various other parameters pertaining to this eclipse.

January 27, 2093 Solar Eclipse Times
Event	Time (UTC)
First Penumbral External Contact	2093 January 27 at 00:43:54.5 UTC
First Umbral External Contact	2093 January 27 at 01:41:24.0 UTC
First Central Line	2093 January 27 at 01:41:54.0 UTC
First Umbral Internal Contact	2093 January 27 at 01:42:24.1 UTC
First Penumbral Internal Contact	2093 January 27 at 02:44:05.0 UTC
Equatorial Conjunction	2093 January 27 at 03:17:37.4 UTC
Greatest Duration	2093 January 27 at 03:19:14.3 UTC
Greatest Eclipse	2093 January 27 at 03:22:16.1 UTC
Ecliptic Conjunction	2093 January 27 at 03:25:06.9 UTC
Last Penumbral Internal Contact	2093 January 27 at 04:00:33.7 UTC
Last Umbral Internal Contact	2093 January 27 at 05:02:13.3 UTC
Last Central Line	2093 January 27 at 05:02:41.8 UTC
Last Umbral External Contact	2093 January 27 at 05:03:10.2 UTC
Last Penumbral External Contact	2093 January 27 at 06:00:43.1 UTC

January 27, 2093 Solar Eclipse Parameters
Parameter	Value
Eclipse Magnitude	1.03403
Eclipse Obscuration	1.06923
Gamma	−0.27372
Sun Right Ascension	20h41m22.6s
Sun Declination	-18°16'28.3"
Sun Semi-Diameter	16'14.6"
Sun Equatorial Horizontal Parallax	08.9"
Moon Right Ascension	20h41m33.8s
Moon Declination	-18°32'48.9"
Moon Semi-Diameter	16'31.4"
Moon Equatorial Horizontal Parallax	1°00'38.7"
ΔT	116.9 s

== Eclipse season ==
This eclipse is part of an eclipse season, a period, roughly every six months, when eclipses occur. Only two (or occasionally three) eclipse seasons occur each year, and each season lasts about 35 days and repeats just short of six months (173 days) later; thus two full eclipse seasons always occur each year. Either two or three eclipses happen each eclipse season. In the sequence below, each eclipse is separated by a fortnight.

Eclipse season of January 2093
January 12 Ascending node (full moon)	January 27 Descending node (new moon)
Penumbral lunar eclipse Lunar Saros 116	Total solar eclipse Solar Saros 142

== Related eclipses ==
=== Eclipses in 2093 ===
- A penumbral lunar eclipse on January 12.
- A total solar eclipse on January 27.
- A partial lunar eclipse on July 8.
- An annular solar eclipse on July 23.

=== Metonic ===
- Preceded by: Solar eclipse of April 10, 2089
- Followed by: Solar eclipse of November 15, 2096

=== Tzolkinex ===
- Preceded by: Solar eclipse of December 16, 2085
- Followed by: Solar eclipse of March 10, 2100

=== Half-Saros ===
- Preceded by: Lunar eclipse of January 22, 2084
- Followed by: Lunar eclipse of February 3, 2102

=== Tritos ===
- Preceded by: Solar eclipse of February 27, 2082
- Followed by: Solar eclipse of December 29, 2103

=== Solar Saros 142 ===
- Preceded by: Solar eclipse of January 16, 2075
- Followed by: Solar eclipse of February 8, 2111

=== Inex ===
- Preceded by: Solar eclipse of February 17, 2064
- Followed by: Solar eclipse of January 8, 2122

=== Triad ===
- Preceded by: Solar eclipse of March 29, 2006
- Followed by: Solar eclipse of November 28, 2179

=== Solar eclipses of 2091–2094 ===
This eclipse is a member of a semester series. An eclipse in a semester series of solar eclipses repeats approximately every 177 days and 4 hours (a semester) at alternating nodes of the Moon's orbit.

The partial solar eclipses on June 13, 2094 and December 7, 2094 occur in the next lunar year eclipse set.

Solar eclipse series sets from 2091 to 2094
Descending node			Ascending node		
Saros	Map	Gamma	Saros	Map	Gamma
122	February 18, 2091 Partial	1.1779	127	August 15, 2091 Total	−0.949
132	February 7, 2092 Annular	0.4322	137	August 3, 2092 Annular	−0.2044
142	January 27, 2093 Total	−0.2737	147	July 23, 2093 Annular	0.5717
152	January 16, 2094 Total	−0.9333	157	July 12, 2094 Partial	1.3150

=== Saros 142 ===
This eclipse is a part of Saros series 142, repeating every 18 years, 11 days, and containing 72 events. The series started with a partial solar eclipse on April 17, 1624. It contains a hybrid eclipse on July 14, 1768, and total eclipses from July 25, 1786 through October 29, 2543. There are no annular eclipses in this set. The series ends at member 72 as a partial eclipse on June 5, 2904. Its eclipses are tabulated in three columns; every third eclipse in the same column is one exeligmos apart, so they all cast shadows over approximately the same parts of the Earth.

The longest duration of totality will be produced by member 38 at 6 minutes, 34 seconds on May 28, 2291. All eclipses in this series occur at the Moon’s descending node of orbit.

Series members 11–32 occur between 1801 and 2200:
11	12	13
August 5, 1804	August 16, 1822	August 27, 1840
14	15	16
September 7, 1858	September 17, 1876	September 29, 1894
17	18	19
October 10, 1912	October 21, 1930	November 1, 1948
20	21	22
November 12, 1966	November 22, 1984	December 4, 2002
23	24	25
December 14, 2020	December 26, 2038	January 5, 2057
26	27	28
January 16, 2075	January 27, 2093	February 8, 2111
29	30	31
February 18, 2129	March 2, 2147	March 12, 2165
32
March 23, 2183

=== Metonic series ===
The metonic series repeats eclipses every 19 years (6939.69 days), lasting about 5 cycles. Eclipses occur in nearly the same calendar date. In addition, the octon subseries repeats 1/5 of that or every 3.8 years (1387.94 days). All eclipses in this table occur at the Moon's descending node.

22 eclipse events between June 23, 2047 and November 16, 2134
June 22–23	April 10–11	January 27–29	November 15–16	September 3–5
118	120	122	124	126
June 23, 2047	April 11, 2051	January 27, 2055	November 16, 2058	September 3, 2062
128	130	132	134	136
June 22, 2066	April 11, 2070	January 27, 2074	November 15, 2077	September 3, 2081
138	140	142	144	146
June 22, 2085	April 10, 2089	January 27, 2093	November 15, 2096	September 4, 2100
148	150	152	154	156
June 22, 2104	April 11, 2108	January 29, 2112	November 16, 2115	September 5, 2119
158	160	162	164	
June 23, 2123			November 16, 2134	

=== Tritos series ===
This eclipse is a part of a tritos cycle, repeating at alternating nodes every 135 synodic months (≈ 3986.63 days, or 11 years minus 1 month). Their appearance and longitude are irregular due to a lack of synchronization with the anomalistic month (period of perigee), but groupings of 3 tritos cycles (≈ 33 years minus 3 months) come close (≈ 434.044 anomalistic months), so eclipses are similar in these groupings.

Series members between 1801 and 2200
April 14, 1809 (Saros 116)	March 14, 1820 (Saros 117)	February 12, 1831 (Saros 118)	January 11, 1842 (Saros 119)	December 11, 1852 (Saros 120)
November 11, 1863 (Saros 121)	October 10, 1874 (Saros 122)	September 8, 1885 (Saros 123)	August 9, 1896 (Saros 124)	July 10, 1907 (Saros 125)
June 8, 1918 (Saros 126)	May 9, 1929 (Saros 127)	April 7, 1940 (Saros 128)	March 7, 1951 (Saros 129)	February 5, 1962 (Saros 130)
January 4, 1973 (Saros 131)	December 4, 1983 (Saros 132)	November 3, 1994 (Saros 133)	October 3, 2005 (Saros 134)	September 1, 2016 (Saros 135)
August 2, 2027 (Saros 136)	July 2, 2038 (Saros 137)	May 31, 2049 (Saros 138)	April 30, 2060 (Saros 139)	March 31, 2071 (Saros 140)
February 27, 2082 (Saros 141)	January 27, 2093 (Saros 142)	December 29, 2103 (Saros 143)	November 27, 2114 (Saros 144)	October 26, 2125 (Saros 145)
September 26, 2136 (Saros 146)	August 26, 2147 (Saros 147)	July 25, 2158 (Saros 148)	June 25, 2169 (Saros 149)	May 24, 2180 (Saros 150)
April 23, 2191 (Saros 151)

=== Inex series ===
This eclipse is a part of the long period inex cycle, repeating at alternating nodes, every 358 synodic months (≈ 10,571.95 days, or 29 years minus 20 days). Their appearance and longitude are irregular due to a lack of synchronization with the anomalistic month (period of perigee). However, groupings of 3 inex cycles (≈ 87 years minus 2 months) comes close (≈ 1,151.02 anomalistic months), so eclipses are similar in these groupings.

Series members between 1801 and 2200
August 17, 1803 (Saros 132)	July 27, 1832 (Saros 133)	July 8, 1861 (Saros 134)
June 17, 1890 (Saros 135)	May 29, 1919 (Saros 136)	May 9, 1948 (Saros 137)
April 18, 1977 (Saros 138)	March 29, 2006 (Saros 139)	March 9, 2035 (Saros 140)
February 17, 2064 (Saros 141)	January 27, 2093 (Saros 142)	January 8, 2122 (Saros 143)
December 19, 2150 (Saros 144)	November 28, 2179 (Saros 145)	
