= Solar eclipse of April 9, 1986 =

20th-century partial solar eclipse

- Partial eclipse
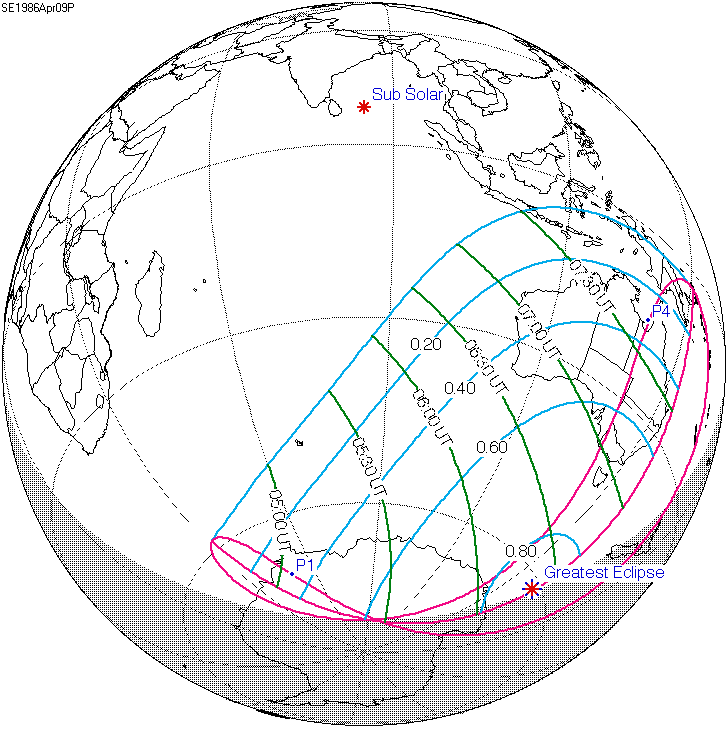
- Map
- Gamma: −1.0822
- Magnitude: 0.8236

Maximum eclipse
- Coordinates: 61.2°S 161.4°E

Times (UTC)
- Greatest eclipse: 6:21:22

References
- Saros: 119 (64 of 71)
- Catalog # (SE5000): 9478

A partial solar eclipse occurred at the Moon's ascending node of orbit on Wednesday, April 9, 1986, with a magnitude of 0.8236. A solar eclipse occurs when the Moon passes between Earth and the Sun, thereby totally or partly obscuring the image of the Sun for a viewer on Earth. A partial solar eclipse occurs in the polar regions of the Earth when the center of the Moon's shadow misses the Earth.

A partial eclipse was visible for parts of Antarctica, Australia, Indonesia, and New Zealand.

== Eclipse details ==
Shown below are two tables displaying details about this particular solar eclipse. The first table outlines times at which the Moon's penumbra or umbra attains the specific parameter, and the second table describes various other parameters pertaining to this eclipse.

April 9, 1986 Solar Eclipse Times
Event	Time (UTC)
First Penumbral External Contact	1986 April 09 at 04:10:36.4 UTC
Equatorial Conjunction	1986 April 09 at 05:14:50.1 UTC
Ecliptic Conjunction	1986 April 09 at 06:09:02.6 UTC
Greatest Eclipse	1986 April 09 at 06:21:22.4 UTC
Last Penumbral External Contact	1986 April 09 at 08:32:39.0 UTC

April 9, 1986 Solar Eclipse Parameters
Parameter	Value
Eclipse Magnitude	0.82362
Eclipse Obscuration	0.75723
Gamma	−1.08215
Sun Right Ascension	01h10m32.0s
Sun Declination	+07°29'00.7"
Sun Semi-Diameter	15'58.1"
Sun Equatorial Horizontal Parallax	08.8"
Moon Right Ascension	01h12m23.9s
Moon Declination	+06°36'30.3"
Moon Semi-Diameter	14'59.5"
Moon Equatorial Horizontal Parallax	0°55'01.4"
ΔT	55.0 s

== Eclipse season ==
This eclipse is part of an eclipse season, a period, roughly every six months, when eclipses occur. Only two (or occasionally three) eclipse seasons occur each year, and each season lasts about 35 days and repeats just short of six months (173 days) later; thus two full eclipse seasons always occur each year. Either two or three eclipses happen each eclipse season. In the sequence below, each eclipse is separated by a fortnight.

Eclipse season of April 1986
April 9 Ascending node (new moon)	April 24 Descending node (full moon)
Partial solar eclipse Solar Saros 119	Total lunar eclipse Lunar Saros 131

== Related eclipses ==
=== Eclipses in 1986 ===
- A partial solar eclipse on April 9.
- A total lunar eclipse on April 24.
- A hybrid solar eclipse on October 3.
- A total lunar eclipse on October 17.

=== Metonic ===
- Preceded by: Solar eclipse of June 21, 1982
- Followed by: Solar eclipse of January 26, 1990

=== Tzolkinex ===
- Preceded by: Solar eclipse of February 26, 1979
- Followed by: Solar eclipse of May 21, 1993

=== Half-Saros ===
- Preceded by: Lunar eclipse of April 4, 1977
- Followed by: Lunar eclipse of April 15, 1995

=== Tritos ===
- Preceded by: Solar eclipse of May 11, 1975
- Followed by: Solar eclipse of March 9, 1997

=== Solar Saros 119 ===
- Preceded by: Solar eclipse of March 28, 1968
- Followed by: Solar eclipse of April 19, 2004

=== Inex ===
- Preceded by: Solar eclipse of April 30, 1957
- Followed by: Solar eclipse of March 20, 2015

=== Triad ===
- Preceded by: Solar eclipse of June 8, 1899
- Followed by: Solar eclipse of February 7, 2073

=== Solar eclipses of 1986–1989 ===
This eclipse is a member of a semester series. An eclipse in a semester series of solar eclipses repeats approximately every 177 days and 4 hours (a semester) at alternating nodes of the Moon's orbit.

Solar eclipse series sets from 1986 to 1989
Ascending node			Descending node		
Saros	Map	Gamma	Saros	Map	Gamma
119	April 9, 1986 Partial	−1.0822	124	October 3, 1986 Hybrid	0.9931
129	March 29, 1987 Hybrid	−0.3053	134	September 23, 1987 Annular	0.2787
139	March 18, 1988 Total	0.4188	144	September 11, 1988 Annular	−0.4681
149	March 7, 1989 Partial	1.0981	154	August 31, 1989 Partial	−1.1928

=== Saros 119 ===
This eclipse is a part of Saros series 119, repeating every 18 years, 11 days, and containing 71 events. The series started with a partial solar eclipse on May 15, 850 AD. It contains total eclipses on August 9, 994 AD and August 20, 1012; a hybrid eclipse on August 31, 1030; and annular eclipses from September 10, 1048 through March 18, 1950. The series ends at member 71 as a partial eclipse on June 24, 2112. Its eclipses are tabulated in three columns; every third eclipse in the same column is one exeligmos apart, so they all cast shadows over approximately the same parts of the Earth.

The longest duration of totality was produced by member 10 at 32 seconds on August 20, 1012, and the longest duration of annularity was produced by member 44 at 7 minutes, 37 seconds on September 1, 1625. All eclipses in this series occur at the Moon’s ascending node of orbit.

Series members 54–71 occur between 1801 and 2112:
54	55	56
December 21, 1805	January 1, 1824	January 11, 1842
57	58	59
January 23, 1860	February 2, 1878	February 13, 1896
60	61	62
February 25, 1914	March 7, 1932	March 18, 1950
63	64	65
March 28, 1968	April 9, 1986	April 19, 2004
66	67	68
April 30, 2022	May 11, 2040	May 22, 2058
69	70	71
June 1, 2076	June 13, 2094	June 24, 2112

=== Metonic series ===
The metonic series repeats eclipses every 19 years (6939.69 days), lasting about 5 cycles. Eclipses occur in nearly the same calendar date. In addition, the octon subseries repeats 1/5 of that or every 3.8 years (1387.94 days). All eclipses in this table occur at the Moon's ascending node.

21 eclipse events between June 21, 1982 and June 21, 2058
June 21	April 8–9	January 26	November 13–14	September 1–2
117	119	121	123	125
June 21, 1982	April 9, 1986	January 26, 1990	November 13, 1993	September 2, 1997
127	129	131	133	135
June 21, 2001	April 8, 2005	January 26, 2009	November 13, 2012	September 1, 2016
137	139	141	143	145
June 21, 2020	April 8, 2024	January 26, 2028	November 14, 2031	September 2, 2035
147	149	151	153	155
June 21, 2039	April 9, 2043	January 26, 2047	November 14, 2050	September 2, 2054
157
June 21, 2058

=== Tritos series ===
This eclipse is a part of a tritos cycle, repeating at alternating nodes every 135 synodic months (≈ 3986.63 days, or 11 years minus 1 month). Their appearance and longitude are irregular due to a lack of synchronization with the anomalistic month (period of perigee), but groupings of 3 tritos cycles (≈ 33 years minus 3 months) come close (≈ 434.044 anomalistic months), so eclipses are similar in these groupings.

Series members between 1866 and 2200
March 16, 1866 (Saros 108)			December 13, 1898 (Saros 111)	
	September 12, 1931 (Saros 114)	August 12, 1942 (Saros 115)	July 11, 1953 (Saros 116)	June 10, 1964 (Saros 117)
May 11, 1975 (Saros 118)	April 9, 1986 (Saros 119)	March 9, 1997 (Saros 120)	February 7, 2008 (Saros 121)	January 6, 2019 (Saros 122)
December 5, 2029 (Saros 123)	November 4, 2040 (Saros 124)	October 4, 2051 (Saros 125)	September 3, 2062 (Saros 126)	August 3, 2073 (Saros 127)
July 3, 2084 (Saros 128)	June 2, 2095 (Saros 129)	May 3, 2106 (Saros 130)	April 2, 2117 (Saros 131)	March 1, 2128 (Saros 132)
January 30, 2139 (Saros 133)	December 30, 2149 (Saros 134)	November 27, 2160 (Saros 135)	October 29, 2171 (Saros 136)	September 27, 2182 (Saros 137)
August 26, 2193 (Saros 138)

=== Inex series ===
This eclipse is a part of the long period inex cycle, repeating at alternating nodes, every 358 synodic months (≈ 10,571.95 days, or 29 years minus 20 days). Their appearance and longitude are irregular due to a lack of synchronization with the anomalistic month (period of perigee). However, groupings of 3 inex cycles (≈ 87 years minus 2 months) comes close (≈ 1,151.02 anomalistic months), so eclipses are similar in these groupings.

Series members between 1801 and 2200
August 7, 1812 (Saros 113)	July 18, 1841 (Saros 114)	June 28, 1870 (Saros 115)
June 8, 1899 (Saros 116)	May 19, 1928 (Saros 117)	April 30, 1957 (Saros 118)
April 9, 1986 (Saros 119)	March 20, 2015 (Saros 120)	February 28, 2044 (Saros 121)
February 7, 2073 (Saros 122)	January 19, 2102 (Saros 123)	December 30, 2130 (Saros 124)
December 9, 2159 (Saros 125)	November 18, 2188 (Saros 126)	
