= Solar eclipse of March 31, 2071 =

Future annular solar eclipse

- Annular eclipse
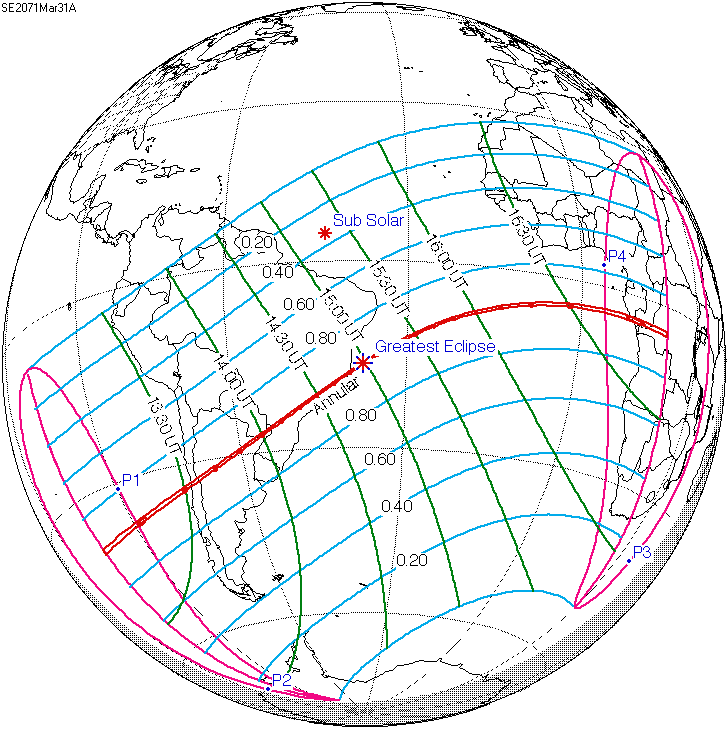
- Map
- Gamma: −0.3739
- Magnitude: 0.9919

Maximum eclipse
- Duration: 52 s (0 min 52 s)
- Coordinates: 16.7°S 37°W
- Max. width of band: 31 km (19 mi)

Times (UTC)
- Greatest eclipse: 15:01:06

References
- Saros: 140 (32 of 71)
- Catalog # (SE5000): 9667

An annular solar eclipse will occur at the Moon's descending node of orbit on Tuesday, March 31, 2071, with a magnitude of 0.9919. A solar eclipse occurs when the Moon passes between Earth and the Sun, thereby totally or partly obscuring the image of the Sun for a viewer on Earth. An annular solar eclipse occurs when the Moon's apparent diameter is smaller than the Sun's, blocking most of the Sun's light and causing the Sun to look like an annulus (ring). An annular eclipse appears as a partial eclipse over a region of the Earth thousands of kilometres wide. The Moon's apparent diameter will be near the average diameter because it will occur 7.2 days after apogee (on March 24, 2071, at 10:05 UTC) and 6.2 days before perigee (on April 6, 2071, at 19:05 UTC).

The path of annularity will be visible from parts of Chile, Argentina, extreme southern Paraguay, Brazil, extreme southern Gabon, Congo, and the Democratic Republic of the Congo. A partial solar eclipse will also be visible for parts of South America, Antarctica, and Africa.

== Eclipse details ==
Shown below are two tables displaying details about this particular solar eclipse. The first table outlines times at which the Moon's penumbra or umbra attains the specific parameter, and the second table describes various other parameters pertaining to this eclipse.

March 31, 2071 Solar Eclipse Times
Event	Time (UTC)
First Penumbral External Contact	2071 March 31 at 12:14:19.7 UTC
First Umbral External Contact	2071 March 31 at 13:17:47.4 UTC
First Central Line	2071 March 31 at 13:18:35.7 UTC
Greatest Duration	2071 March 31 at 13:18:35.7 UTC
First Umbral Internal Contact	2071 March 31 at 13:19:24.0 UTC
First Penumbral Internal Contact	2071 March 31 at 14:34:35.2 UTC
Equatorial Conjunction	2071 March 31 at 14:48:09.5 UTC
Greatest Eclipse	2071 March 31 at 15:01:06.4 UTC
Ecliptic Conjunction	2071 March 31 at 15:05:13.1 UTC
Last Penumbral Internal Contact	2071 March 31 at 15:28:00.2 UTC
Last Umbral Internal Contact	2071 March 31 at 16:43:00.5 UTC
Last Central Line	2071 March 31 at 16:43:45.8 UTC
Last Umbral External Contact	2071 March 31 at 16:44:31.0 UTC
Last Penumbral External Contact	2071 March 31 at 17:47:52.6 UTC

March 31, 2071 Solar Eclipse Parameters
Parameter	Value
Eclipse Magnitude	0.99186
Eclipse Obscuration	0.98379
Gamma	−0.37393
Sun Right Ascension	00h40m27.6s
Sun Declination	+04°21'06.6"
Sun Semi-Diameter	16'00.8"
Sun Equatorial Horizontal Parallax	08.8"
Moon Right Ascension	00h40m53.3s
Moon Declination	+04°00'40.0"
Moon Semi-Diameter	15'38.9"
Moon Equatorial Horizontal Parallax	0°57'25.9"
ΔT	98.5 s

== Eclipse season ==
This eclipse is part of an eclipse season, a period, roughly every six months, when eclipses occur. Only two (or occasionally three) eclipse seasons occur each year, and each season lasts about 35 days and repeats just short of six months (173 days) later; thus two full eclipse seasons always occur each year. Either two or three eclipses happen each eclipse season. In the sequence below, each eclipse is separated by a fortnight.

Eclipse season of March 2071
March 16 Ascending node (full moon)	March 31 Descending node (new moon)
Penumbral lunar eclipse Lunar Saros 114	Annular solar eclipse Solar Saros 140

== Related eclipses ==
=== Eclipses in 2071 ===
- A penumbral lunar eclipse on March 16.
- An annular solar eclipse on March 31.
- A penumbral lunar eclipse on September 9.
- A total solar eclipse on September 23.

=== Metonic ===
- Preceded by: Solar eclipse of June 11, 2067
- Followed by: Solar eclipse of January 16, 2075

=== Tzolkinex ===
- Preceded by: Solar eclipse of February 17, 2064
- Followed by: Solar eclipse of May 11, 2078

=== Half-Saros ===
- Preceded by: Lunar eclipse of March 25, 2062
- Followed by: Lunar eclipse of April 4, 2080

=== Tritos ===
- Preceded by: Solar eclipse of April 30, 2060
- Followed by: Solar eclipse of February 27, 2082

=== Solar Saros 140 ===
- Preceded by: Solar eclipse of March 20, 2053
- Followed by: Solar eclipse of April 10, 2089

=== Inex ===
- Preceded by: Solar eclipse of April 20, 2042
- Followed by: Solar eclipse of March 10, 2100

=== Triad ===
- Preceded by: Solar eclipse of May 30, 1984
- Followed by: Solar eclipse of January 30, 2158

=== Solar eclipses of 2069–2072 ===
This eclipse is a member of a semester series. An eclipse in a semester series of solar eclipses repeats approximately every 177 days and 4 hours (a semester) at alternating nodes of the Moon's orbit.

The partial solar eclipse on May 20, 2069 occurs in the previous lunar year eclipse set.

Solar eclipse series sets from 2069 to 2072
Descending node			Ascending node		
Saros	Map	Gamma	Saros	Map	Gamma
120	April 21, 2069 Partial	1.0624	125	October 15, 2069 Partial	−1.2524
130	April 11, 2070 Total	0.3652	135	October 4, 2070 Annular	−0.495
140	March 31, 2071 Annular	−0.3739	145	September 23, 2071 Total	0.262
150	March 19, 2072 Partial	−1.1405	155	September 12, 2072 Total	0.9655

=== Saros 140 ===
This eclipse is a part of Saros series 140, repeating every 18 years, 11 days, and containing 71 events. The series started with a partial solar eclipse on April 16, 1512. It contains total eclipses from July 21, 1656 through November 9, 1836; hybrid eclipses from November 20, 1854 through December 23, 1908; and annular eclipses from January 3, 1927 through December 7, 2485. The series ends at member 71 as a partial eclipse on June 1, 2774. Its eclipses are tabulated in three columns; every third eclipse in the same column is one exeligmos apart, so they all cast shadows over approximately the same parts of the Earth.

The longest duration of totality was produced by member 11 at 4 minutes, 10 seconds on August 12, 1692, and the longest duration of annularity will be produced by member 53 at 7 minutes, 35 seconds on November 15, 2449. All eclipses in this series occur at the Moon’s descending node of orbit.

Series members 18–39 occur between 1801 and 2200:
18	19	20
October 29, 1818	November 9, 1836	November 20, 1854
21	22	23
November 30, 1872	December 12, 1890	December 23, 1908
24	25	26
January 3, 1927	January 14, 1945	January 25, 1963
27	28	29
February 4, 1981	February 16, 1999	February 26, 2017
30	31	32
March 9, 2035	March 20, 2053	March 31, 2071
33	34	35
April 10, 2089	April 23, 2107	May 3, 2125
36	37	38
May 14, 2143	May 25, 2161	June 5, 2179
39
June 15, 2197

=== Metonic series ===
The metonic series repeats eclipses every 19 years (6939.69 days), lasting about 5 cycles. Eclipses occur in nearly the same calendar date. In addition, the octon subseries repeats 1/5 of that or every 3.8 years (1387.94 days). All eclipses in this table occur at the Moon's descending node.

22 eclipse events between June 12, 2029 and November 4, 2116
June 11–12	March 30–31	January 16	November 4–5	August 23–24
118	120	122	124	126
June 12, 2029	March 30, 2033	January 16, 2037	November 4, 2040	August 23, 2044
128	130	132	134	136
June 11, 2048	March 30, 2052	January 16, 2056	November 5, 2059	August 24, 2063
138	140	142	144	146
June 11, 2067	March 31, 2071	January 16, 2075	November 4, 2078	August 24, 2082
148	150	152	154	156
June 11, 2086	March 31, 2090	January 16, 2094	November 4, 2097	August 24, 2101
158	160	162	164	
June 12, 2105			November 4, 2116	

=== Tritos series ===
This eclipse is a part of a tritos cycle, repeating at alternating nodes every 135 synodic months (≈ 3986.63 days, or 11 years minus 1 month). Their appearance and longitude are irregular due to a lack of synchronization with the anomalistic month (period of perigee), but groupings of 3 tritos cycles (≈ 33 years minus 3 months) come close (≈ 434.044 anomalistic months), so eclipses are similar in these groupings.

Series members between 1801 and 2200
April 14, 1809 (Saros 116)	March 14, 1820 (Saros 117)	February 12, 1831 (Saros 118)	January 11, 1842 (Saros 119)	December 11, 1852 (Saros 120)
November 11, 1863 (Saros 121)	October 10, 1874 (Saros 122)	September 8, 1885 (Saros 123)	August 9, 1896 (Saros 124)	July 10, 1907 (Saros 125)
June 8, 1918 (Saros 126)	May 9, 1929 (Saros 127)	April 7, 1940 (Saros 128)	March 7, 1951 (Saros 129)	February 5, 1962 (Saros 130)
January 4, 1973 (Saros 131)	December 4, 1983 (Saros 132)	November 3, 1994 (Saros 133)	October 3, 2005 (Saros 134)	September 1, 2016 (Saros 135)
August 2, 2027 (Saros 136)	July 2, 2038 (Saros 137)	May 31, 2049 (Saros 138)	April 30, 2060 (Saros 139)	March 31, 2071 (Saros 140)
February 27, 2082 (Saros 141)	January 27, 2093 (Saros 142)	December 29, 2103 (Saros 143)	November 27, 2114 (Saros 144)	October 26, 2125 (Saros 145)
September 26, 2136 (Saros 146)	August 26, 2147 (Saros 147)	July 25, 2158 (Saros 148)	June 25, 2169 (Saros 149)	May 24, 2180 (Saros 150)
April 23, 2191 (Saros 151)

=== Inex series ===
This eclipse is a part of the long period inex cycle, repeating at alternating nodes, every 358 synodic months (≈ 10,571.95 days, or 29 years minus 20 days). Their appearance and longitude are irregular due to a lack of synchronization with the anomalistic month (period of perigee). However, groupings of 3 inex cycles (≈ 87 years minus 2 months) comes close (≈ 1,151.02 anomalistic months), so eclipses are similar in these groupings.

Series members between 1801 and 2200
September 28, 1810 (Saros 131)	September 7, 1839 (Saros 132)	August 18, 1868 (Saros 133)
July 29, 1897 (Saros 134)	July 9, 1926 (Saros 135)	June 20, 1955 (Saros 136)
May 30, 1984 (Saros 137)	May 10, 2013 (Saros 138)	April 20, 2042 (Saros 139)
March 31, 2071 (Saros 140)	March 10, 2100 (Saros 141)	February 18, 2129 (Saros 142)
January 30, 2158 (Saros 143)	January 9, 2187 (Saros 144)	
