= Solar eclipse of March 18, 1950 =

20th-century annular solar eclipse

- Annular eclipse
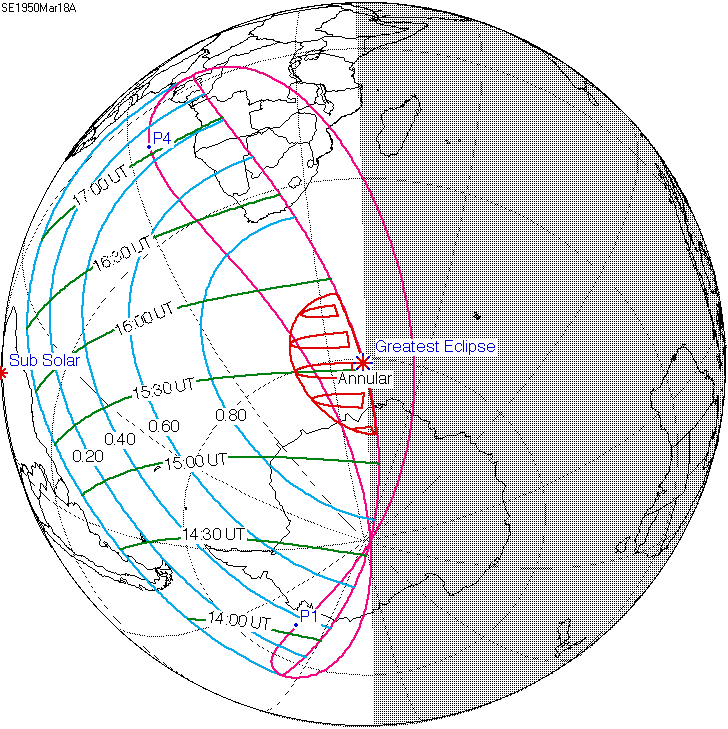
- Map
- Gamma: 0.9988
- Magnitude: 0.962

Maximum eclipse
- Duration: -
- Coordinates: 60.9°S 40.9°E
- Max. width of band: km

Times (UTC)
- Greatest eclipse: 15:32:01

References
- Saros: 119 (62 of 71)
- Catalog # (SE5000): 9398

An annular solar eclipse occurred at the Moon's ascending node of orbit on Saturday, March 18, 1950, with a magnitude of 0.962. A solar eclipse occurs when the Moon passes between Earth and the Sun, thereby totally or partly obscuring the image of the Sun for a viewer on Earth. An annular solar eclipse occurs when the Moon's apparent diameter is smaller than the Sun's, blocking most of the Sun's light and causing the Sun to look like an annulus (ring). An annular eclipse appears as a partial eclipse over a region of the Earth thousands of kilometres wide. Occurring about 3.8 days before apogee (on March 22, 1950, at 10:50 UTC), the Moon's apparent diameter was smaller.

It was unusual in that while it is an annular solar eclipse, it is not a central solar eclipse. A non-central eclipse is one where the center-line of annularity or totality, whatever it is, does not intersect the surface of the Earth (when the gamma is between 0.9972 and 1.0260). This rare type occurs when annularity is only visible at sunset or sunrise in a polar region.

Annularity was visible from a part of Antarctica. A partial eclipse was visible for extreme southern South America, Antarctica, and Southern Africa. This was the last of 54 umbral solar eclipses in Solar Saros 119.

== Eclipse details ==
Shown below are two tables displaying details about this particular solar eclipse. The first table outlines times at which the Moon's penumbra or umbra attains the specific parameter, and the second table describes various other parameters pertaining to this eclipse.

March 18, 1950 Solar Eclipse Times
Event	Time (UTC)
First Penumbral External Contact	1950 March 18 at 13:11:15.9 UTC
Equatorial Conjunction	1950 March 18 at 14:27:07.9 UTC
First Umbral External Contact	1950 March 18 at 15:09:02.7 UTC
Ecliptic Conjunction	1950 March 18 at 15:20:29.9 UTC
Greatest Eclipse	1950 March 18 at 15:32:01.3 UTC
Last Umbral External Contact	1950 March 18 at 15:55:41.2 UTC
Last Penumbral External Contact	1950 March 18 at 17:53:16.2 UTC

March 18, 1950 Solar Eclipse Parameters
Parameter	Value
Eclipse Magnitude	0.96198
Eclipse Obscuration	-
Gamma	−0.99880
Sun Right Ascension	23h50m43.1s
Sun Declination	-01°00'22.1"
Sun Semi-Diameter	16'03.9"
Sun Equatorial Horizontal Parallax	08.8"
Moon Right Ascension	23h52m29.2s
Moon Declination	-01°48'04.0"
Moon Semi-Diameter	14'55.6"
Moon Equatorial Horizontal Parallax	0°54'47.0"
ΔT	29.2 s

== Eclipse season ==
This eclipse is part of an eclipse season, a period, roughly every six months, when eclipses occur. Only two (or occasionally three) eclipse seasons occur each year, and each season lasts about 35 days and repeats just short of six months (173 days) later; thus two full eclipse seasons always occur each year. Either two or three eclipses happen each eclipse season. In the sequence below, each eclipse is separated by a fortnight.

Eclipse season of March–April 1950
March 18 Ascending node (new moon)	April 2 Descending node (full moon)
Annular solar eclipse Solar Saros 119	Total lunar eclipse Lunar Saros 131

== Related eclipses ==
=== Eclipses in 1950 ===
- A non-central annular solar eclipse on March 18.
- A total lunar eclipse on April 2.
- A total solar eclipse on September 12.
- A total lunar eclipse on September 26.

=== Metonic ===
- Preceded by: Solar eclipse of May 30, 1946
- Followed by: Solar eclipse of January 5, 1954

=== Tzolkinex ===
- Preceded by: Solar eclipse of February 4, 1943
- Followed by: Solar eclipse of April 30, 1957

=== Half-Saros ===
- Preceded by: Lunar eclipse of March 13, 1941
- Followed by: Lunar eclipse of March 24, 1959

=== Tritos ===
- Preceded by: Solar eclipse of April 19, 1939
- Followed by: Solar eclipse of February 15, 1961

=== Solar Saros 119 ===
- Preceded by: Solar eclipse of March 7, 1932
- Followed by: Solar eclipse of March 28, 1968

=== Inex ===
- Preceded by: Solar eclipse of April 8, 1921
- Followed by: Solar eclipse of February 26, 1979

=== Triad ===
- Preceded by: Solar eclipse of May 17, 1863
- Followed by: Solar eclipse of January 16, 2037

=== Solar eclipses of 1950–1953 ===
This eclipse is a member of a semester series. An eclipse in a semester series of solar eclipses repeats approximately every 177 days and 4 hours (a semester) at alternating nodes of the Moon's orbit.

The partial solar eclipse on July 11, 1953 occurs in the next lunar year eclipse set.

Solar eclipse series sets from 1950 to 1953
Ascending node			Descending node		
Saros	Map	Gamma	Saros	Map	Gamma
119	March 18, 1950 Annular (non-central)	0.9988	124	September 12, 1950 Total	0.8903
129	March 7, 1951 Annular	−0.242	134	September 1, 1951 Annular	0.1557
139	February 25, 1952 Total	0.4697	144	August 20, 1952 Annular	−0.6102
149	February 14, 1953 Partial	1.1331	154	August 9, 1953 Partial	−1.344

=== Saros 119 ===
This eclipse is a part of Saros series 119, repeating every 18 years, 11 days, and containing 71 events. The series started with a partial solar eclipse on May 15, 850 AD. It contains total eclipses on August 9, 994 AD and August 20, 1012; a hybrid eclipse on August 31, 1030; and annular eclipses from September 10, 1048 through March 18, 1950. The series ends at member 71 as a partial eclipse on June 24, 2112. Its eclipses are tabulated in three columns; every third eclipse in the same column is one exeligmos apart, so they all cast shadows over approximately the same parts of the Earth.

The longest duration of totality was produced by member 10 at 32 seconds on August 20, 1012, and the longest duration of annularity was produced by member 44 at 7 minutes, 37 seconds on September 1, 1625. All eclipses in this series occur at the Moon’s ascending node of orbit.

Series members 54–71 occur between 1801 and 2112:
54	55	56
December 21, 1805	January 1, 1824	January 11, 1842
57	58	59
January 23, 1860	February 2, 1878	February 13, 1896
60	61	62
February 25, 1914	March 7, 1932	March 18, 1950
63	64	65
March 28, 1968	April 9, 1986	April 19, 2004
66	67	68
April 30, 2022	May 11, 2040	May 22, 2058
69	70	71
June 1, 2076	June 13, 2094	June 24, 2112

=== Metonic series ===
The metonic series repeats eclipses every 19 years (6939.69 days), lasting about 5 cycles. Eclipses occur in nearly the same calendar date. In addition, the octon subseries repeats 1/5 of that or every 3.8 years (1387.94 days). All eclipses in this table occur at the Moon's ascending node.

22 eclipse events between January 5, 1935 and August 11, 2018
January 4–5	October 23–24	August 10–12	May 30–31	March 18–19
111	113	115	117	119
January 5, 1935		August 12, 1942	May 30, 1946	March 18, 1950
121	123	125	127	129
January 5, 1954	October 23, 1957	August 11, 1961	May 30, 1965	March 18, 1969
131	133	135	137	139
January 4, 1973	October 23, 1976	August 10, 1980	May 30, 1984	March 18, 1988
141	143	145	147	149
January 4, 1992	October 24, 1995	August 11, 1999	May 31, 2003	March 19, 2007
151	153	155		
January 4, 2011	October 23, 2014	August 11, 2018		

=== Tritos series ===
This eclipse is a part of a tritos cycle, repeating at alternating nodes every 135 synodic months (≈ 3986.63 days, or 11 years minus 1 month). Their appearance and longitude are irregular due to a lack of synchronization with the anomalistic month (period of perigee), but groupings of 3 tritos cycles (≈ 33 years minus 3 months) come close (≈ 434.044 anomalistic months), so eclipses are similar in these groupings.

Series members between 1801 and 2200
March 25, 1819 (Saros 107)	February 23, 1830 (Saros 108)	January 22, 1841 (Saros 109)		November 21, 1862 (Saros 111)
		August 20, 1895 (Saros 114)	July 21, 1906 (Saros 115)	June 19, 1917 (Saros 116)
May 19, 1928 (Saros 117)	April 19, 1939 (Saros 118)	March 18, 1950 (Saros 119)	February 15, 1961 (Saros 120)	January 16, 1972 (Saros 121)
December 15, 1982 (Saros 122)	November 13, 1993 (Saros 123)	October 14, 2004 (Saros 124)	September 13, 2015 (Saros 125)	August 12, 2026 (Saros 126)
July 13, 2037 (Saros 127)	June 11, 2048 (Saros 128)	May 11, 2059 (Saros 129)	April 11, 2070 (Saros 130)	March 10, 2081 (Saros 131)
February 7, 2092 (Saros 132)	January 8, 2103 (Saros 133)	December 8, 2113 (Saros 134)	November 6, 2124 (Saros 135)	October 7, 2135 (Saros 136)
September 6, 2146 (Saros 137)	August 5, 2157 (Saros 138)	July 5, 2168 (Saros 139)	June 5, 2179 (Saros 140)	May 4, 2190 (Saros 141)

=== Inex series ===
This eclipse is a part of the long period inex cycle, repeating at alternating nodes, every 358 synodic months (≈ 10,571.95 days, or 29 years minus 20 days). Their appearance and longitude are irregular due to a lack of synchronization with the anomalistic month (period of perigee). However, groupings of 3 inex cycles (≈ 87 years minus 2 months) comes close (≈ 1,151.02 anomalistic months), so eclipses are similar in these groupings.

Series members between 1801 and 2200
June 26, 1805 (Saros 114)	June 7, 1834 (Saros 115)	May 17, 1863 (Saros 116)
April 26, 1892 (Saros 117)	April 8, 1921 (Saros 118)	March 18, 1950 (Saros 119)
February 26, 1979 (Saros 120)	February 7, 2008 (Saros 121)	January 16, 2037 (Saros 122)
December 27, 2065 (Saros 123)	December 7, 2094 (Saros 124)	November 18, 2123 (Saros 125)
October 28, 2152 (Saros 126)	October 8, 2181 (Saros 127)	
