= Solar eclipse of June 1, 2076 =

Future partial solar eclipse

- Partial eclipse
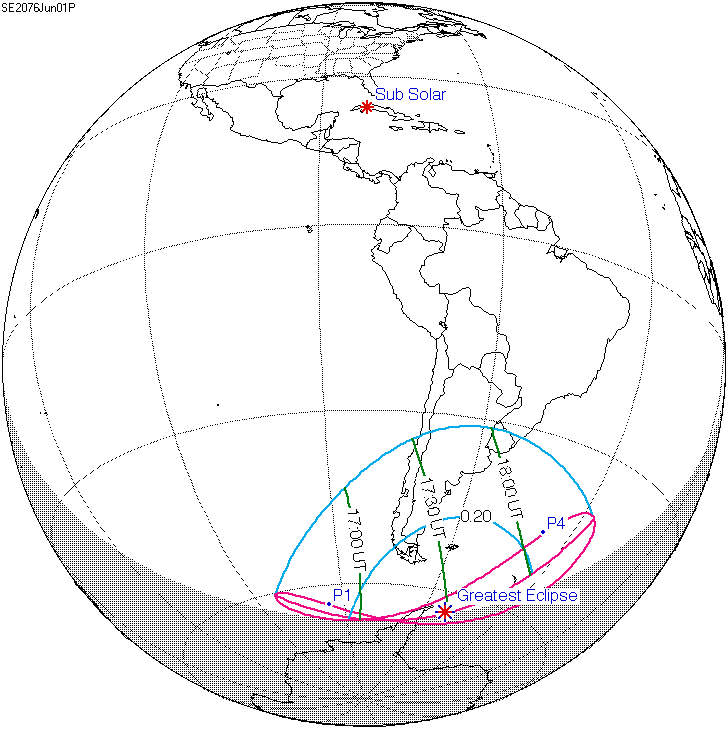
- Map
- Gamma: −1.3897
- Magnitude: 0.2897

Maximum eclipse
- Coordinates: 64.4°S 51.2°W

Times (UTC)
- Greatest eclipse: 17:31:22

References
- Saros: 119 (69 of 71)
- Catalog # (SE5000): 9679

A partial solar eclipse will occur at the Moon's ascending node of orbit on Monday, June 1, 2076, with a magnitude of 0.2897. A solar eclipse occurs when the Moon passes between Earth and the Sun, thereby totally or partly obscuring the image of the Sun for a viewer on Earth. A partial solar eclipse occurs in the polar regions of the Earth when the center of the Moon's shadow misses the Earth.

This will be the second of four solar eclipses in 2076, with the others occurring on January 6, July 1, and November 26.

The partial solar eclipse will be visible for parts of southern South America and the Antarctic Peninsula.

== Eclipse details ==
Shown below are two tables displaying details about this particular solar eclipse. The first table outlines times at which the Moon's penumbra or umbra attains the specific parameter, and the second table describes various other parameters pertaining to this eclipse.

June 1, 2076 Solar Eclipse Times
Event	Time (UTC)
First Penumbral External Contact	2076 June 1 at 16:11:56.2 UTC
Equatorial Conjunction	2076 June 1 at 16:54:32.2 UTC
Ecliptic Conjunction	2076 June 1 at 17:16:09.9 UTC
Greatest Eclipse	2076 June 1 at 17:31:21.9 UTC
Last Penumbral External Contact	2076 June 1 at 18:51:07.6 UTC

June 1, 2076 Solar Eclipse Parameters
Parameter	Value
Eclipse Magnitude	0.28972
Eclipse Obscuration	0.17696
Gamma	−1.38966
Sun Right Ascension	04h42m27.8s
Sun Declination	+22°14'01.6"
Sun Semi-Diameter	15'46.3"
Sun Equatorial Horizontal Parallax	08.7"
Moon Right Ascension	04h43m42.6s
Moon Declination	+20°58'42.6"
Moon Semi-Diameter	15'11.7"
Moon Equatorial Horizontal Parallax	0°55'45.9"
ΔT	102.5 s

== Eclipse season ==
This eclipse is part of an eclipse season, a period, roughly every six months, when eclipses occur. Only two (or occasionally three) eclipse seasons occur each year, and each season lasts about 35 days and repeats just short of six months (173 days) later; thus two full eclipse seasons always occur each year. Either two or three eclipses happen each eclipse season. In the sequence below, each eclipse is separated by a fortnight. The first and last eclipse in this sequence is separated by one synodic month.

Eclipse season of June–July 2076
June 1 Ascending node (new moon)	June 17 Descending node (full moon)	July 1 Ascending node (new moon)
Partial solar eclipse Solar Saros 119	Total lunar eclipse Lunar Saros 131	Partial solar eclipse Solar Saros 157

== Related eclipses ==
=== Eclipses in 2076 ===
- A total solar eclipse on January 6.
- A partial solar eclipse on June 1.
- A total lunar eclipse on June 17.
- A partial solar eclipse on July 1.
- A partial solar eclipse on November 26.
- A total lunar eclipse on December 10.

=== Metonic ===
- Followed by: Solar eclipse of March 21, 2080

=== Tzolkinex ===
- Preceded by: Solar eclipse of April 21, 2069
- Followed by: Solar eclipse of July 15, 2083

=== Half-Saros ===
- Preceded by: Lunar eclipse of May 28, 2067
- Followed by: Lunar eclipse of June 8, 2085

=== Tritos ===
- Preceded by: Solar eclipse of July 3, 2065
- Followed by: Solar eclipse of May 2, 2087

=== Solar Saros 119 ===
- Preceded by: Solar eclipse of May 22, 2058
- Followed by: Solar eclipse of June 13, 2094

=== Inex ===
- Preceded by: Solar eclipse of June 23, 2047
- Followed by: Solar eclipse of May 14, 2105

=== Triad ===
- Followed by: Solar eclipse of April 3, 2163

=== Solar eclipses of 2076–2079 ===
This eclipse is a member of a semester series. An eclipse in a semester series of solar eclipses repeats approximately every 177 days and 4 hours (a semester) at alternating nodes of the Moon's orbit.

The partial solar eclipses on January 6, 2076 and July 1, 2076 occur in the previous lunar year eclipse set.

Solar eclipse series sets from 2076 to 2079
Ascending node			Descending node		
Saros	Map	Gamma	Saros	Map	Gamma
119	June 1, 2076 Partial	−1.3897	124	November 26, 2076 Partial	1.1401
129	May 22, 2077 Total	−0.5725	134	November 15, 2077 Annular	0.4705
139	May 11, 2078 Total	0.1838	144	November 4, 2078 Annular	−0.2285
149	May 1, 2079 Total	0.9081	154	October 24, 2079 Annular	−0.9243

=== Saros 119 ===
This eclipse is a part of Saros series 119, repeating every 18 years, 11 days, and containing 71 events. The series started with a partial solar eclipse on May 15, 850 AD. It contains total eclipses on August 9, 994 AD and August 20, 1012; a hybrid eclipse on August 31, 1030; and annular eclipses from September 10, 1048 through March 18, 1950. The series ends at member 71 as a partial eclipse on June 24, 2112. Its eclipses are tabulated in three columns; every third eclipse in the same column is one exeligmos apart, so they all cast shadows over approximately the same parts of the Earth.

The longest duration of totality was produced by member 10 at 32 seconds on August 20, 1012, and the longest duration of annularity was produced by member 44 at 7 minutes, 37 seconds on September 1, 1625. All eclipses in this series occur at the Moon’s ascending node of orbit.

Series members 54–71 occur between 1801 and 2112:
54	55	56
December 21, 1805	January 1, 1824	January 11, 1842
57	58	59
January 23, 1860	February 2, 1878	February 13, 1896
60	61	62
February 25, 1914	March 7, 1932	March 18, 1950
63	64	65
March 28, 1968	April 9, 1986	April 19, 2004
66	67	68
April 30, 2022	May 11, 2040	May 22, 2058
69	70	71
June 1, 2076	June 13, 2094	June 24, 2112

=== Metonic series ===
The metonic series repeats eclipses every 19 years (6939.69 days), lasting about 5 cycles. Eclipses occur in nearly the same calendar date. In addition, the octon subseries repeats 1/5 of that or every 3.8 years (1387.94 days). All eclipses in this table occur at the Moon's ascending node.

22 eclipse events between June 1, 2076 and October 27, 2163
June 1–3	March 21–22	January 7–8	October 26–27	August 14–15
119	121	123	125	127
June 1, 2076	March 21, 2080	January 7, 2084	October 26, 2087	August 15, 2091
129	131	133	135	137
June 2, 2095	March 21, 2099	January 8, 2103	October 26, 2106	August 15, 2110
139	141	143	145	147
June 3, 2114	March 22, 2118	January 8, 2122	October 26, 2125	August 15, 2129
149	151	153	155	157
June 3, 2133	March 21, 2137	January 8, 2141	October 26, 2144	August 14, 2148
159	161	163	165	
June 3, 2152			October 27, 2163	

=== Tritos series ===
This eclipse is a part of a tritos cycle, repeating at alternating nodes every 135 synodic months (≈ 3986.63 days, or 11 years minus 1 month). Their appearance and longitude are irregular due to a lack of synchronization with the anomalistic month (period of perigee), but groupings of 3 tritos cycles (≈ 33 years minus 3 months) come close (≈ 434.044 anomalistic months), so eclipses are similar in these groupings.

Series members between 2054 and 2200
August 3, 2054 (Saros 117)	July 3, 2065 (Saros 118)	June 1, 2076 (Saros 119)	May 2, 2087 (Saros 120)	April 1, 2098 (Saros 121)
March 1, 2109 (Saros 122)	January 30, 2120 (Saros 123)	December 30, 2130 (Saros 124)	November 28, 2141 (Saros 125)	October 28, 2152 (Saros 126)
September 28, 2163 (Saros 127)	August 27, 2174 (Saros 128)	July 26, 2185 (Saros 129)	June 26, 2196 (Saros 130)	

=== Inex series ===
This eclipse is a part of the long period inex cycle, repeating at alternating nodes, every 358 synodic months (≈ 10,571.95 days, or 29 years minus 20 days). Their appearance and longitude are irregular due to a lack of synchronization with the anomalistic month (period of perigee). However, groupings of 3 inex cycles (≈ 87 years minus 2 months) comes close (≈ 1,151.02 anomalistic months), so eclipses are similar in these groupings.

Series members between 1844 and 2200
November 10, 1844 (Saros 111)		
September 12, 1931 (Saros 114)		
July 13, 2018 (Saros 117)	June 23, 2047 (Saros 118)	June 1, 2076 (Saros 119)
May 14, 2105 (Saros 120)	April 24, 2134 (Saros 121)	April 3, 2163 (Saros 122)
March 13, 2192 (Saros 123)		
