= Solar eclipse of April 10, 2089 =

Future annular solar eclipse

- Annular eclipse
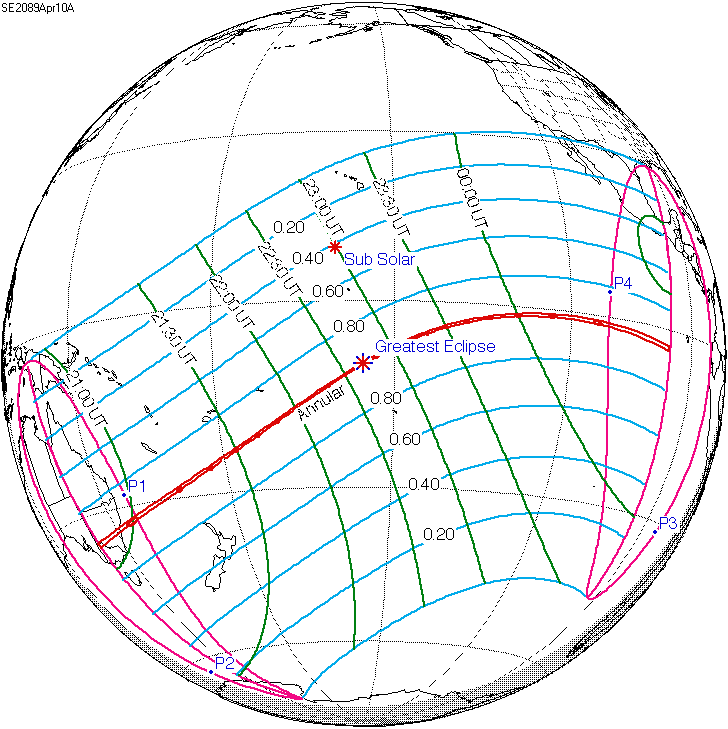
- Map
- Gamma: −0.3319
- Magnitude: 0.9919

Maximum eclipse
- Duration: 53 s (0 min 53 s)
- Coordinates: 10.2°S 154.8°W
- Max. width of band: 30 km (19 mi)

Times (UTC)
- Greatest eclipse: 22:44:42

References
- Saros: 140 (33 of 71)
- Catalog # (SE5000): 9708

An annular solar eclipse will occur at the Moon's descending node of orbit between Sunday, April 10 and Monday, April 11, 2089, with a magnitude of 0.9919. A solar eclipse occurs when the Moon passes between Earth and the Sun, thereby totally or partly obscuring the image of the Sun for a viewer on Earth. An annular solar eclipse occurs when the Moon's apparent diameter is smaller than the Sun's, blocking most of the Sun's light and causing the Sun to look like an annulus (ring). An annular eclipse appears as a partial eclipse over a region of the Earth thousands of kilometres wide. The Moon's apparent diameter will be near the average diameter because it will occur 7 days after apogee (on April 3, 2089, at 23:20 UTC) and 6.8 days before perigee (on April 17, 2089, at 17:00 UTC).

The path of annularity will be visible from parts of southeastern Australia, Tonga, and Niue. A partial solar eclipse will also be visible for parts of Australia, Oceania, Antarctica, Mexico, and Central America.

== Eclipse details ==
Shown below are two tables displaying details about this particular solar eclipse. The first table outlines times at which the Moon's penumbra or umbra attains the specific parameter, and the second table describes various other parameters pertaining to this eclipse.

April 10, 2089 Solar Eclipse Times
Event	Time (UTC)
First Penumbral External Contact	2089 April 10 at 19:56:15.6 UTC
First Umbral External Contact	2089 April 10 at 20:59:15.4 UTC
First Central Line	2089 April 10 at 21:00:03.3 UTC
Greatest Duration	2089 April 10 at 21:00:03.3 UTC
First Umbral Internal Contact	2089 April 10 at 21:00:51.4 UTC
First Penumbral Internal Contact	2089 April 10 at 22:11:51.4 UTC
Equatorial Conjunction	2089 April 10 at 22:33:57.5 UTC
Greatest Eclipse	2089 April 10 at 22:44:41.5 UTC
Ecliptic Conjunction	2089 April 10 at 22:48:21.4 UTC
Last Penumbral Internal Contact	2089 April 10 at 23:17:50.5 UTC
Last Umbral Internal Contact	2089 April 11 at 00:28:41.8 UTC
Last Central Line	2089 April 11 at 00:29:26.8 UTC
Last Umbral External Contact	2089 April 11 at 00:30:11.6 UTC
Last Penumbral External Contact	2089 April 11 at 01:33:05.8 UTC

April 10, 2089 Solar Eclipse Parameters
Parameter	Value
Eclipse Magnitude	0.99192
Eclipse Obscuration	0.98391
Gamma	−0.33186
Sun Right Ascension	01h20m36.9s
Sun Declination	+08°29'24.5"
Sun Semi-Diameter	15'57.8"
Sun Equatorial Horizontal Parallax	08.8"
Moon Right Ascension	01h20m58.3s
Moon Declination	+08°11'12.9"
Moon Semi-Diameter	15'35.9"
Moon Equatorial Horizontal Parallax	0°57'14.7"
ΔT	113.5 s

== Eclipse season ==
This eclipse is part of an eclipse season, a period, roughly every six months, when eclipses occur. Only two (or occasionally three) eclipse seasons occur each year, and each season lasts about 35 days and repeats just short of six months (173 days) later; thus two full eclipse seasons always occur each year. Either two or three eclipses happen each eclipse season. In the sequence below, each eclipse is separated by a fortnight.

Eclipse season of March–April 2089
March 26 Ascending node (full moon)	April 10 Descending node (new moon)
Penumbral lunar eclipse Lunar Saros 114	Annular solar eclipse Solar Saros 140

== Related eclipses ==
=== Eclipses in 2089 ===
- A penumbral lunar eclipse on March 26.
- An annular solar eclipse on April 10.
- A penumbral lunar eclipse on September 19.
- A total solar eclipse on October 4.

=== Metonic ===
- Preceded by: Solar eclipse of June 22, 2085
- Followed by: Solar eclipse of January 27, 2093

=== Tzolkinex ===
- Preceded by: Solar eclipse of February 27, 2082
- Followed by: Solar eclipse of May 22, 2096

=== Half-Saros ===
- Preceded by: Lunar eclipse of April 4, 2080
- Followed by: Lunar eclipse of April 15, 2098

=== Tritos ===
- Preceded by: Solar eclipse of May 11, 2078
- Followed by: Solar eclipse of March 10, 2100

=== Solar Saros 140 ===
- Preceded by: Solar eclipse of March 31, 2071
- Followed by: Solar eclipse of April 23, 2107

=== Inex ===
- Preceded by: Solar eclipse of April 30, 2060
- Followed by: Solar eclipse of March 22, 2118

=== Triad ===
- Preceded by: Solar eclipse of June 10, 2002
- Followed by: Solar eclipse of February 10, 2176

=== Solar eclipses of 2087–2090 ===
This eclipse is a member of a semester series. An eclipse in a semester series of solar eclipses repeats approximately every 177 days and 4 hours (a semester) at alternating nodes of the Moon's orbit.

The partial solar eclipse on June 1, 2087 occurs in the previous lunar year eclipse set.

Solar eclipse series sets from 2087 to 2090
Descending node			Ascending node		
Saros	Map	Gamma	Saros	Map	Gamma
120	May 2, 2087 Partial	1.1139	125	October 26, 2087 Partial	−1.2882
130	April 21, 2088 Total	0.4135	135	October 14, 2088 Annular	−0.5349
140	April 10, 2089 Annular	−0.3319	145	October 4, 2089 Total	0.2167
150	March 31, 2090 Partial	−1.1028	155	September 23, 2090 Total	0.9157

=== Saros 140 ===
This eclipse is a part of Saros series 140, repeating every 18 years, 11 days, and containing 71 events. The series started with a partial solar eclipse on April 16, 1512. It contains total eclipses from July 21, 1656 through November 9, 1836; hybrid eclipses from November 20, 1854 through December 23, 1908; and annular eclipses from January 3, 1927 through December 7, 2485. The series ends at member 71 as a partial eclipse on June 1, 2774. Its eclipses are tabulated in three columns; every third eclipse in the same column is one exeligmos apart, so they all cast shadows over approximately the same parts of the Earth.

The longest duration of totality was produced by member 11 at 4 minutes, 10 seconds on August 12, 1692, and the longest duration of annularity will be produced by member 53 at 7 minutes, 35 seconds on November 15, 2449. All eclipses in this series occur at the Moon’s descending node of orbit.

Series members 18–39 occur between 1801 and 2200:
18	19	20
October 29, 1818	November 9, 1836	November 20, 1854
21	22	23
November 30, 1872	December 12, 1890	December 23, 1908
24	25	26
January 3, 1927	January 14, 1945	January 25, 1963
27	28	29
February 4, 1981	February 16, 1999	February 26, 2017
30	31	32
March 9, 2035	March 20, 2053	March 31, 2071
33	34	35
April 10, 2089	April 23, 2107	May 3, 2125
36	37	38
May 14, 2143	May 25, 2161	June 5, 2179
39
June 15, 2197

=== Metonic series ===
The metonic series repeats eclipses every 19 years (6939.69 days), lasting about 5 cycles. Eclipses occur in nearly the same calendar date. In addition, the octon subseries repeats 1/5 of that or every 3.8 years (1387.94 days). All eclipses in this table occur at the Moon's descending node.

22 eclipse events between June 23, 2047 and November 16, 2134
June 22–23	April 10–11	January 27–29	November 15–16	September 3–5
118	120	122	124	126
June 23, 2047	April 11, 2051	January 27, 2055	November 16, 2058	September 3, 2062
128	130	132	134	136
June 22, 2066	April 11, 2070	January 27, 2074	November 15, 2077	September 3, 2081
138	140	142	144	146
June 22, 2085	April 10, 2089	January 27, 2093	November 15, 2096	September 4, 2100
148	150	152	154	156
June 22, 2104	April 11, 2108	January 29, 2112	November 16, 2115	September 5, 2119
158	160	162	164	
June 23, 2123			November 16, 2134	

=== Tritos series ===
This eclipse is a part of a tritos cycle, repeating at alternating nodes every 135 synodic months (≈ 3986.63 days, or 11 years minus 1 month). Their appearance and longitude are irregular due to a lack of synchronization with the anomalistic month (period of perigee), but groupings of 3 tritos cycles (≈ 33 years minus 3 months) come close (≈ 434.044 anomalistic months), so eclipses are similar in these groupings.

Series members between 1801 and 2200
June 26, 1805 (Saros 114)	May 27, 1816 (Saros 115)	April 26, 1827 (Saros 116)	March 25, 1838 (Saros 117)	February 23, 1849 (Saros 118)
January 23, 1860 (Saros 119)	December 22, 1870 (Saros 120)	November 21, 1881 (Saros 121)	October 20, 1892 (Saros 122)	September 21, 1903 (Saros 123)
August 21, 1914 (Saros 124)	July 20, 1925 (Saros 125)	June 19, 1936 (Saros 126)	May 20, 1947 (Saros 127)	April 19, 1958 (Saros 128)
March 18, 1969 (Saros 129)	February 16, 1980 (Saros 130)	January 15, 1991 (Saros 131)	December 14, 2001 (Saros 132)	November 13, 2012 (Saros 133)
October 14, 2023 (Saros 134)	September 12, 2034 (Saros 135)	August 12, 2045 (Saros 136)	July 12, 2056 (Saros 137)	June 11, 2067 (Saros 138)
May 11, 2078 (Saros 139)	April 10, 2089 (Saros 140)	March 10, 2100 (Saros 141)	February 8, 2111 (Saros 142)	January 8, 2122 (Saros 143)
December 7, 2132 (Saros 144)	November 7, 2143 (Saros 145)	October 7, 2154 (Saros 146)	September 5, 2165 (Saros 147)	August 4, 2176 (Saros 148)
July 6, 2187 (Saros 149)	June 4, 2198 (Saros 150)			

=== Inex series ===
This eclipse is a part of the long period inex cycle, repeating at alternating nodes, every 358 synodic months (≈ 10,571.95 days, or 29 years minus 20 days). Their appearance and longitude are irregular due to a lack of synchronization with the anomalistic month (period of perigee). However, groupings of 3 inex cycles (≈ 87 years minus 2 months) comes close (≈ 1,151.02 anomalistic months), so eclipses are similar in these groupings.

Series members between 1801 and 2200
October 9, 1828 (Saros 131)	September 18, 1857 (Saros 132)	August 29, 1886 (Saros 133)
August 10, 1915 (Saros 134)	July 20, 1944 (Saros 135)	June 30, 1973 (Saros 136)
June 10, 2002 (Saros 137)	May 21, 2031 (Saros 138)	April 30, 2060 (Saros 139)
April 10, 2089 (Saros 140)	March 22, 2118 (Saros 141)	March 2, 2147 (Saros 142)
February 10, 2176 (Saros 143)		
