= Solar eclipse of November 15, 2077 =

Future annular solar eclipse

- Annular eclipse
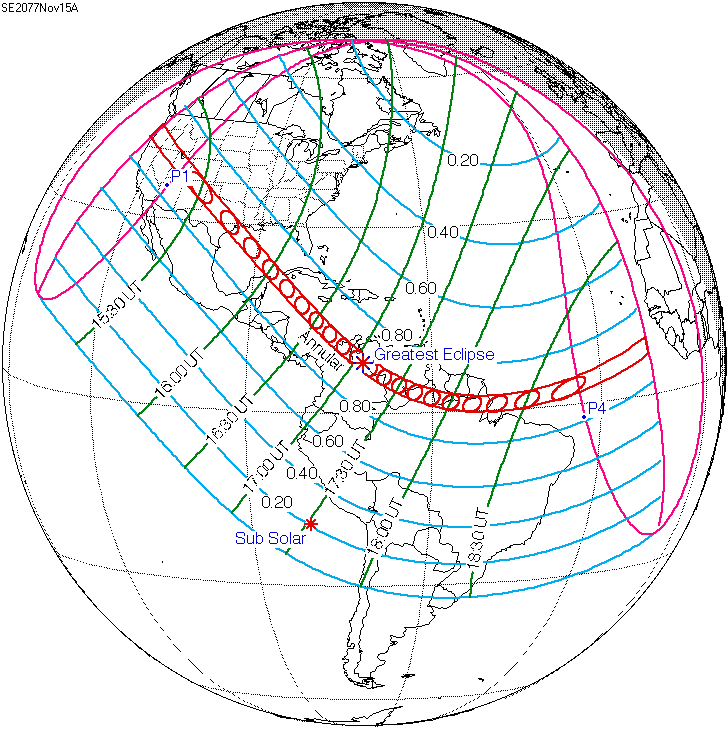
- Map
- Gamma: 0.4705
- Magnitude: 0.9371

Maximum eclipse
- Duration: 474 s (7 min 54 s)
- Coordinates: 7.8°N 70.8°W
- Max. width of band: 262 km (163 mi)

Times (UTC)
- Greatest eclipse: 17:07:56

References
- Saros: 134 (47 of 71)
- Catalog # (SE5000): 9682

An annular solar eclipse will occur at the Moon's descending node of orbit on Monday, November 15, 2077, with a magnitude of 0.9371. A solar eclipse occurs when the Moon passes between Earth and the Sun, thereby totally or partially obscuring the image of the Sun for a viewer on Earth. An annular solar eclipse occurs when the Moon's apparent diameter is smaller than the Sun's, blocking most of the Sun's light and causing the Sun to look like an annulus (ring). An annular eclipse appears as a partial eclipse over a region of the Earth thousands of kilometres wide. Occurring about 4 days after apogee (on November 11, 2077, at 17:20 UTC), the Moon's apparent diameter will be smaller.

The path of annularity will be visible from parts of Oregon, southwestern Washington, northeastern California, Idaho, Nevada, Utah, Colorado, Arizona, New Mexico, Texas in the United States, the northeastern Yucatán Peninsula, the western tip of Cuba, Colombia, Venezuela, northern Brazil, Guyana, southern Suriname, and extreme southern French Guiana. A partial solar eclipse will also be visible for parts of North America, Central America, the Caribbean, South America, and West Africa.

== Eclipse details ==
Shown below are two tables displaying details about this particular solar eclipse. The first table outlines times at which the Moon's penumbra or umbra attains the specific parameter, and the second table describes various other parameters pertaining to this eclipse.

November 15, 2077 Solar Eclipse Times
Event	Time (UTC)
First Penumbral External Contact	2077 November 15 at 14:13:10.5 UTC
First Umbral External Contact	2077 November 15 at 15:22:03.8 UTC
First Central Line	2077 November 15 at 15:25:03.1 UTC
First Umbral Internal Contact	2077 November 15 at 15:28:03.6 UTC
Equatorial Conjunction	2077 November 15 at 16:47:52.0 UTC
Ecliptic Conjunction	2077 November 15 at 17:02:23.8 UTC
Greatest Eclipse	2077 November 15 at 17:07:56.2 UTC
Greatest Duration	2077 November 15 at 17:21:02.7 UTC
Last Umbral Internal Contact	2077 November 15 at 18:48:03.6 UTC
Last Central Line	2077 November 15 at 18:51:01.7 UTC
Last Umbral External Contact	2077 November 15 at 18:53:58.6 UTC
Last Penumbral External Contact	2077 November 15 at 20:02:45.4 UTC

November 15, 2077 Solar Eclipse Parameters
Parameter	Value
Eclipse Magnitude	0.93707
Eclipse Obscuration	0.87810
Gamma	0.47047
Sun Right Ascension	15h26m24.3s
Sun Declination	-18°45'33.3"
Sun Semi-Diameter	16'10.1"
Sun Equatorial Horizontal Parallax	08.9"
Moon Right Ascension	15h27m01.5s
Moon Declination	-18°21'22.3"
Moon Semi-Diameter	14'56.9"
Moon Equatorial Horizontal Parallax	0°54'51.8"
ΔT	103.7 s

== Eclipse season ==
This eclipse is part of an eclipse season, a period, roughly every six months, when eclipses occur. Only two (or occasionally three) eclipse seasons occur each year, and each season lasts about 35 days and repeats just short of six months (173 days) later; thus two full eclipse seasons always occur each year. Either two or three eclipses happen each eclipse season. In the sequence below, each eclipse is separated by a fortnight.

Eclipse season of November 2077
November 15 Descending node (new moon)	November 29 Ascending node (full moon)
Annular solar eclipse Solar Saros 134	Partial lunar eclipse Lunar Saros 146

== Related eclipses ==
=== Eclipses in 2077 ===
- A total solar eclipse on May 22.
- A partial lunar eclipse on June 6.
- An annular solar eclipse on November 15.
- A partial lunar eclipse on November 29.

=== Metonic ===
- Preceded by: Solar eclipse of January 27, 2074
- Followed by: Solar eclipse of September 3, 2081

=== Tzolkinex ===
- Preceded by: Solar eclipse of October 4, 2070
- Followed by: Solar eclipse of December 27, 2084

=== Half-Saros ===
- Preceded by: Lunar eclipse of November 9, 2068
- Followed by: Lunar eclipse of November 20, 2086

=== Tritos ===
- Preceded by: Solar eclipse of December 17, 2066
- Followed by: Solar eclipse of October 14, 2088

=== Solar Saros 134 ===
- Preceded by: Solar eclipse of November 5, 2059
- Followed by: Solar eclipse of November 27, 2095

=== Inex ===
- Preceded by: Solar eclipse of December 5, 2048
- Followed by: Solar eclipse of October 26, 2106

=== Triad ===
- Preceded by: Solar eclipse of January 15, 1991
- Followed by: Solar eclipse of September 16, 2164

=== Solar eclipses of 2076–2079 ===
This eclipse is a member of a semester series. An eclipse in a semester series of solar eclipses repeats approximately every 177 days and 4 hours (a semester) at alternating nodes of the Moon's orbit.

The partial solar eclipses on January 6, 2076 and July 1, 2076 occur in the previous lunar year eclipse set.

Solar eclipse series sets from 2076 to 2079
Ascending node			Descending node		
Saros	Map	Gamma	Saros	Map	Gamma
119	June 1, 2076 Partial	−1.3897	124	November 26, 2076 Partial	1.1401
129	May 22, 2077 Total	−0.5725	134	November 15, 2077 Annular	0.4705
139	May 11, 2078 Total	0.1838	144	November 4, 2078 Annular	−0.2285
149	May 1, 2079 Total	0.9081	154	October 24, 2079 Annular	−0.9243

=== Saros 134 ===
This eclipse is a part of Saros series 134, repeating every 18 years, 11 days, and containing 71 events. The series started with a partial solar eclipse on June 22, 1248. It contains total eclipses from October 9, 1428 through December 24, 1554; hybrid eclipses from January 3, 1573 through June 27, 1843; and annular eclipses from July 8, 1861 through May 21, 2384. The series ends at member 72 as a partial eclipse on August 6, 2510. Its eclipses are tabulated in three columns; every third eclipse in the same column is one exeligmos apart, so they all cast shadows over approximately the same parts of the Earth.

The longest duration of totality was produced by member 11 at 1 minutes, 30 seconds on October 9, 1428, and the longest duration of annularity will be produced by member 52 at 10 minutes, 55 seconds on January 10, 2168. All eclipses in this series occur at the Moon’s descending node of orbit.

Series members 32–53 occur between 1801 and 2200:
32	33	34
June 6, 1807	June 16, 1825	June 27, 1843
35	36	37
July 8, 1861	July 19, 1879	July 29, 1897
38	39	40
August 10, 1915	August 21, 1933	September 1, 1951
41	42	43
September 11, 1969	September 23, 1987	October 3, 2005
44	45	46
October 14, 2023	October 25, 2041	November 5, 2059
47	48	49
November 15, 2077	November 27, 2095	December 8, 2113
50	51	52
December 19, 2131	December 30, 2149	January 10, 2168
53
January 20, 2186

=== Metonic series ===
The metonic series repeats eclipses every 19 years (6939.69 days), lasting about 5 cycles. Eclipses occur in nearly the same calendar date. In addition, the octon subseries repeats 1/5 of that or every 3.8 years (1387.94 days). All eclipses in this table occur at the Moon's descending node.

22 eclipse events between June 23, 2047 and November 16, 2134
June 22–23	April 10–11	January 27–29	November 15–16	September 3–5
118	120	122	124	126
June 23, 2047	April 11, 2051	January 27, 2055	November 16, 2058	September 3, 2062
128	130	132	134	136
June 22, 2066	April 11, 2070	January 27, 2074	November 15, 2077	September 3, 2081
138	140	142	144	146
June 22, 2085	April 10, 2089	January 27, 2093	November 15, 2096	September 4, 2100
148	150	152	154	156
June 22, 2104	April 11, 2108	January 29, 2112	November 16, 2115	September 5, 2119
158	160	162	164	
June 23, 2123			November 16, 2134	

=== Tritos series ===
This eclipse is a part of a tritos cycle, repeating at alternating nodes every 135 synodic months (≈ 3986.63 days, or 11 years minus 1 month). Their appearance and longitude are irregular due to a lack of synchronization with the anomalistic month (period of perigee), but groupings of 3 tritos cycles (≈ 33 years minus 3 months) come close (≈ 434.044 anomalistic months), so eclipses are similar in these groupings.

Series members between 1801 and 2200
January 1, 1805 (Saros 109)		October 31, 1826 (Saros 111)		August 28, 1848 (Saros 113)
July 29, 1859 (Saros 114)	June 28, 1870 (Saros 115)	May 27, 1881 (Saros 116)	April 26, 1892 (Saros 117)	March 29, 1903 (Saros 118)
February 25, 1914 (Saros 119)	January 24, 1925 (Saros 120)	December 25, 1935 (Saros 121)	November 23, 1946 (Saros 122)	October 23, 1957 (Saros 123)
September 22, 1968 (Saros 124)	August 22, 1979 (Saros 125)	July 22, 1990 (Saros 126)	June 21, 2001 (Saros 127)	May 20, 2012 (Saros 128)
April 20, 2023 (Saros 129)	March 20, 2034 (Saros 130)	February 16, 2045 (Saros 131)	January 16, 2056 (Saros 132)	December 17, 2066 (Saros 133)
November 15, 2077 (Saros 134)	October 14, 2088 (Saros 135)	September 14, 2099 (Saros 136)	August 15, 2110 (Saros 137)	July 14, 2121 (Saros 138)
June 13, 2132 (Saros 139)	May 14, 2143 (Saros 140)	April 12, 2154 (Saros 141)	March 12, 2165 (Saros 142)	February 10, 2176 (Saros 143)
January 9, 2187 (Saros 144)	December 9, 2197 (Saros 145)			

=== Inex series ===
This eclipse is a part of the long period inex cycle, repeating at alternating nodes, every 358 synodic months (≈ 10,571.95 days, or 29 years minus 20 days). Their appearance and longitude are irregular due to a lack of synchronization with the anomalistic month (period of perigee). However, groupings of 3 inex cycles (≈ 87 years minus 2 months) comes close (≈ 1,151.02 anomalistic months), so eclipses are similar in these groupings.

Series members between 1801 and 2200
May 16, 1817 (Saros 125)	April 25, 1846 (Saros 126)	April 6, 1875 (Saros 127)
March 17, 1904 (Saros 128)	February 24, 1933 (Saros 129)	February 5, 1962 (Saros 130)
January 15, 1991 (Saros 131)	December 26, 2019 (Saros 132)	December 5, 2048 (Saros 133)
November 15, 2077 (Saros 134)	October 26, 2106 (Saros 135)	October 7, 2135 (Saros 136)
September 16, 2164 (Saros 137)	August 26, 2193 (Saros 138)	
