= Solar Saros 119 =

Saros cycle series 119 for solar eclipses

Saros 119

Saros cycle series 119 for solar eclipses occurs at the Moon's ascending node, repeating every 18 years, 11 days, containing 71 eclipses, including 54 umbral eclipses (2 total, 1 hybrid, and 51 annular). The first eclipse was on 15 May 850 and the last will be on 24 June 2112. The most recent eclipse was a partial eclipse on 30 April 2022 and the next will be a partial eclipse on 11 May 2040. The longest duration of totality was only 32 seconds on August 20, 1012. The longest duration of annularity was 7 minutes, 37 seconds on September 1, 1625.

Series members 54–70 occurring between 1801 and 2100:
54	55	56
December 21, 1805	January 1, 1824	January 11, 1842
57	58	59
January 23, 1860	February 2, 1878	February 13, 1896
60	61	62
February 25, 1914	March 7, 1932	March 18, 1950
63	64	65
March 28, 1968	April 9, 1986	April 19, 2004
66	67	68
April 30, 2022	May 11, 2040	May 22, 2058
69	70	
June 1, 2076	June 13, 2094	

== Umbral eclipses ==
Umbral eclipses (annular, total and hybrid) can be further classified as either: 1) Central (two limits), 2) Central (one limit) or 3) Non-Central (one limit). The statistical distribution of these classes in Saros series 119 appears in the following table.

Classification	Number	Percent
All Umbral eclipses	54	100.00%
Central (two limits)	52	96.30%
Central (one limit)	0	0.00%
Non-central (one limit)	2	3.70%

== All eclipses ==
Note: Dates are given in the Julian calendar prior to 15 October 1582, and in the Gregorian calendar after that.

Saros	Member	Date	Time (Greatest) UTC	Type	Location Lat, Long	Gamma	Mag.	Width (km)	Duration (min:sec)	Ref
119	1	May 15, 850	12:49:29	Partial	63.2N 138.7W	1.5295	0.0066			
119	2	May 25, 868	20:11:13	Partial	64N 100.9E	1.4636	0.1327			
119	3	June 6, 886	3:28:26	Partial	64.8N 18.7W	1.3944	0.2647			
119	4	June 16, 904	10:45:03	Partial	65.8N 138.4W	1.3251	0.3964			
119	5	June 27, 922	18:00:27	Partial	66.7N 101.8E	1.2555	0.5277			
119	6	July 8, 940	1:16:23	Partial	67.7N 18.5W	1.1868	0.6564			
119	7	July 19, 958	8:34:18	Partial	68.7N 139.8W	1.1204	0.7797			
119	8	July 29, 976	15:55:20	Partial	69.6N 97.6E	1.0571	0.8957			
119	9	August 9, 994	23:21:16	Total	70.5N 26.8W	0.9985	1.0017	-	-	
119	10	August 20, 1012	6:50:51	Total	73N 143.6E	0.9437	1.0086	91	0m 32s	
119	11	August 31, 1030	14:27:31	Hybrid	64.8N 6.5E	0.8957	1.0044	34	0m 18s	
119	12	September 10, 1048	22:09:40	Annular	56.8N 119.9W	0.853	0.9995	4	0m 2s	
119	13	September 22, 1066	5:59:31	Annular	49.7N 115.7E	0.8173	0.9941	35	0m 29s	
119	14	October 2, 1084	13:55:25	Annular	43.3N 8.6W	0.7874	0.9887	64	1m 0s	
119	15	October 13, 1102	21:59:25	Annular	37.8N 133.9W	0.7648	0.9833	91	1m 35s	
119	16	October 24, 1120	6:09:13	Annular	33.2N 100E	0.7478	0.9781	117	2m 12s	
119	17	November 4, 1138	14:24:41	Annular	29.4N 27.2W	0.7362	0.9732	141	2m 51s	
119	18	November 14, 1156	22:44:29	Annular	26.5N 155.2W	0.7287	0.9687	164	3m 28s	
119	19	November 26, 1174	7:08:31	Annular	24.4N 76E	0.725	0.9648	185	4m 2s	
119	20	December 6, 1192	15:33:28	Annular	23.1N 52.9W	0.7228	0.9614	203	4m 30s	
119	21	December 17, 1210	23:58:47	Annular	22.5N 178.1E	0.7215	0.9585	217	4m 51s	
119	22	December 28, 1228	8:22:01	Annular	22.5N 49.7E	0.719	0.9563	227	5m 4s	
119	23	January 8, 1247	16:43:15	Annular	23.1N 78.1W	0.7154	0.9547	234	5m 9s	
119	24	January 19, 1265	0:57:35	Annular	23.9N 156E	0.7068	0.9538	234	5m 8s	
119	25	January 30, 1283	9:06:55	Annular	25.1N 31.5E	0.6948	0.9533	232	5m 2s	
119	26	February 9, 1301	17:06:50	Annular	26.4N 90.3W	0.6757	0.9533	226	4m 53s	
119	27	February 21, 1319	0:59:44	Annular	28N 150.1E	0.6516	0.9537	218	4m 42s	
119	28	March 3, 1337	8:40:41	Annular	29.5N 34.1E	0.6182	0.9543	207	4m 32s	
119	29	March 14, 1355	16:13:55	Annular	31.2N 79.3W	0.5792	0.9552	196	4m 22s	
119	30	March 24, 1373	23:35:23	Annular	32.7N 170.9E	0.5311	0.9561	186	4m 15s	
119	31	April 5, 1391	6:47:41	Annular	33.9N 64.2E	0.4761	0.957	176	4m 11s	
119	32	April 15, 1409	13:49:19	Annular	34.6N 39.1W	0.413	0.9577	168	4m 11s	
119	33	April 26, 1427	20:43:40	Annular	34.7N 140.2W	0.3444	0.9583	161	4m 15s	
119	34	May 7, 1445	3:29:38	Annular	33.8N 121.2E	0.2692	0.9585	157	4m 24s	
119	35	May 18, 1463	10:08:52	Annular	31.9N 24.2E	0.189	0.9584	154	4m 38s	
119	36	May 28, 1481	16:42:59	Annular	28.8N 71.9W	0.1053	0.9577	155	4m 57s	
119	37	June 8, 1499	23:13:39	Annular	24.7N 167.8W	0.0195	0.9567	158	5m 22s	
119	38	June 19, 1517	5:41:31	Annular	19.5N 96.1E	-0.0683	0.9552	164	5m 50s	
119	39	June 30, 1535	12:08:20	Annular	13.5N 0.6W	-0.1565	0.9533	173	6m 19s	
119	40	July 10, 1553	18:36:34	Annular	6.8N 98.5W	-0.243	0.9509	185	6m 46s	
119	41	July 22, 1571	1:07:18	Annular	0.5S 162.1E	-0.3266	0.9481	201	7m 8s	
119	42	August 11, 1589	7:41:04	Annular	8.2S 61.4E	-0.4072	0.945	221	7m 25s	
119	43	August 22, 1607	14:20:48	Annular	16.1S 41.4W	-0.4824	0.9416	245	7m 34s	
119	44	September 1, 1625	21:06:57	Annular	24.2S 146.4W	-0.552	0.938	274	7m 37s	
119	45	September 13, 1643	4:01:21	Annular	32.3S 106.3E	-0.6145	0.9343	307	7m 35s	
119	46	September 23, 1661	11:02:34	Annular	40.3S 3W	-0.6711	0.9306	347	7m 29s	
119	47	October 4, 1679	18:13:56	Annular	48S 114.9W	-0.7191	0.927	391	7m 21s	
119	48	October 15, 1697	1:33:41	Annular	55.5S 131.2E	-0.7603	0.9236	441	7m 12s	
119	49	October 27, 1715	9:02:48	Annular	62.5S 15.5E	-0.7939	0.9206	494	7m 2s	
119	50	November 6, 1733	16:40:15	Annular	69S 101.2W	-0.8208	0.9179	548	6m 53s	
119	51	November 18, 1751	0:26:00	Annular	74.9S 142.8E	-0.8411	0.9159	597	6m 45s	
119	52	November 28, 1769	8:18:40	Annular	80S 32E	-0.8559	0.9144	638	6m 38s	
119	53	December 9, 1787	16:15:38	Annular	83.4S 62.7W	-0.8675	0.9136	672	6m 32s	
119	54	December 21, 1805	0:17:38	Annular	83.1S 143.8W	-0.8751	0.9134	692	6m 27s	
119	55	January 1, 1824	8:21:09	Annular	79.9S 116.2E	-0.8821	0.9139	705	6m 21s	
119	56	January 11, 1842	16:25:41	Annular	75.8S 1.4E	-0.8882	0.9151	710	6m 15s	
119	57	January 23, 1860	0:27:31	Annular	71.8S 117.2W	-0.8969	0.9168	719	6m 7s	
119	58	February 2, 1878	8:27:52	Annular	67.9S 122.4E	-0.9071	0.9191	729	5m 59s	
119	59	February 13, 1896	16:23:13	Annular	64.6S 3.5E	-0.922	0.9218	761	5m 48s	
119	60	February 25, 1914	0:13:01	Annular	62.1S 113.3W	-0.9416	0.9248	839	5m 35s	
119	61	March 7, 1932	7:55:50	Annular	60.7S 134.4E	-0.9673	0.9277	1083	5m 19s	
119	62	March 18, 1950	15:32:01	Annular	60.9S 40.9E	0.9988	0.962	-	-	
119	63	March 28, 1968	23:00:30	Partial	61S 79.8W	-1.037	0.899			
119	64	April 9, 1986	6:21:22	Partial	61.2S 161.4E	-1.0822	0.8236			
119	65	April 19, 2004	13:35:05	Partial	61.6S 44.3E	-1.1335	0.7367			
119	66	April 30, 2022	20:42:36	Partial	62.1S 71.5W	-1.1901	0.6396			
119	67	May 11, 2040	3:43:02	Partial	62.8S 174.4E	-1.2529	0.5306			
119	68	May 22, 2058	10:39:25	Partial	63.5S 61.1E	-1.3194	0.4141			
119	69	June 1, 2076	17:31:22	Partial	64.4S 51.2W	-1.3897	0.2897			
119	70	June 13, 2094	0:22:11	Partial	65.3S 163.6W	-1.4613	0.1618			
119	71	June 24, 2112	7:09:53	Partial	66.3S 84.4E	-1.5356	0.0282			
