= Solar eclipse of May 22, 2058 =

Future partial solar eclipse

- Partial eclipse
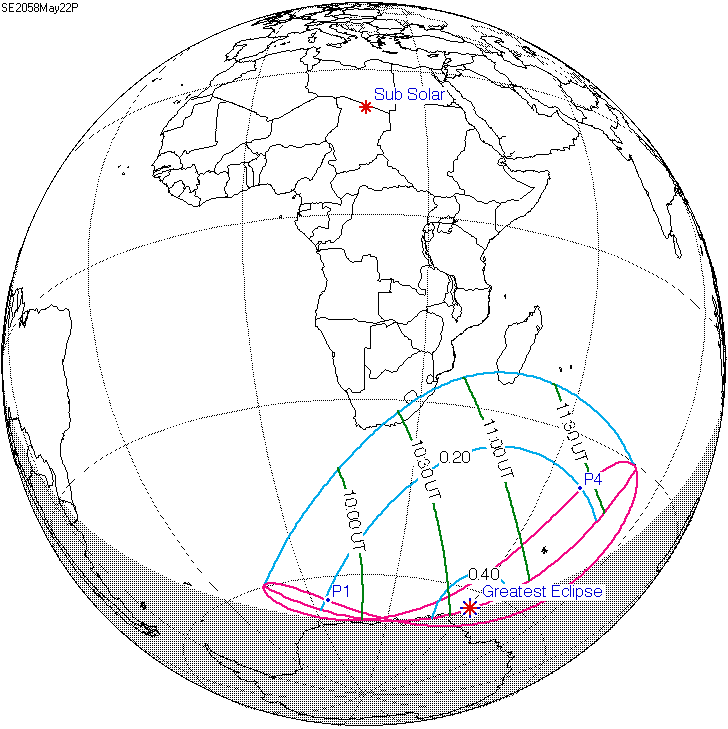
- Map
- Gamma: −1.3194
- Magnitude: 0.4141

Maximum eclipse
- Coordinates: 63.5°S 61.1°E

Times (UTC)
- Greatest eclipse: 10:39:25

References
- Saros: 119 (68 of 71)
- Catalog # (SE5000): 9638

A partial solar eclipse will occur at the Moon's ascending node of orbit on Wednesday, May 22, 2058, with a magnitude of 0.4141. A solar eclipse occurs when the Moon passes between Earth and the Sun, thereby totally or partly obscuring the image of the Sun for a viewer on Earth. A partial solar eclipse occurs in the polar regions of the Earth when the center of the Moon's shadow misses the Earth.

The partial solar eclipse will be visible for parts of Antarctica, extreme southern South Africa, and southern Madagascar.

== Eclipse details ==
Shown below are two tables displaying details about this particular solar eclipse. The first table outlines times at which the Moon's penumbra or umbra attains the specific parameter, and the second table describes various other parameters pertaining to this eclipse.

May 22, 2058 Solar Eclipse Times
Event	Time (UTC)
First Penumbral External Contact	2058 May 22 at 09:05:01.4 UTC
Equatorial Conjunction	2058 May 22 at 09:52:44.5 UTC
Ecliptic Conjunction	2058 May 22 at 10:24:51.8 UTC
Greatest Eclipse	2058 May 22 at 10:39:25.5 UTC
Last Penumbral External Contact	2058 May 22 at 12:14:13.5 UTC

May 22, 2058 Solar Eclipse Parameters
Parameter	Value
Eclipse Magnitude	0.41409
Eclipse Obscuration	0.29549
Gamma	−1.31939
Sun Right Ascension	03h58m00.8s
Sun Declination	+20°28'40.9"
Sun Semi-Diameter	15'48.1"
Sun Equatorial Horizontal Parallax	08.7"
Moon Right Ascension	03h59m32.2s
Moon Declination	+19°18'44.2"
Moon Semi-Diameter	15'09.0"
Moon Equatorial Horizontal Parallax	0°55'36.1"
ΔT	89.3 s

== Eclipse season ==
This eclipse is part of an eclipse season, a period, roughly every six months, when eclipses occur. Only two (or occasionally three) eclipse seasons occur each year, and each season lasts about 35 days and repeats just short of six months (173 days) later; thus two full eclipse seasons always occur each year. Either two or three eclipses happen each eclipse season. In the sequence below, each eclipse is separated by a fortnight. The first and last eclipse in this sequence is separated by one synodic month.

Eclipse season of May–June 2058
May 22 Ascending node (new moon)	June 6 Descending node (full moon)	June 21 Ascending node (new moon)
Partial solar eclipse Solar Saros 119	Total lunar eclipse Lunar Saros 131	Partial solar eclipse Solar Saros 157

== Related eclipses ==
=== Eclipses in 2058 ===
- A partial solar eclipse on May 22.
- A total lunar eclipse on June 6.
- A partial solar eclipse on June 21.
- A partial solar eclipse on November 16.
- A total lunar eclipse on November 30.

=== Metonic ===
- Preceded by: Solar eclipse of August 3, 2054
- Followed by: Solar eclipse of March 11, 2062

=== Tzolkinex ===
- Preceded by: Solar eclipse of April 11, 2051
- Followed by: Solar eclipse of July 3, 2065

=== Half-Saros ===
- Preceded by: Lunar eclipse of May 17, 2049
- Followed by: Lunar eclipse of May 28, 2067

=== Tritos ===
- Preceded by: Solar eclipse of June 23, 2047
- Followed by: Solar eclipse of April 21, 2069

=== Solar Saros 119 ===
- Preceded by: Solar eclipse of May 11, 2040
- Followed by: Solar eclipse of June 1, 2076

=== Inex ===
- Preceded by: Solar eclipse of June 12, 2029
- Followed by: Solar eclipse of May 2, 2087

=== Triad ===
- Preceded by: Solar eclipse of July 22, 1971
- Followed by: Solar eclipse of March 23, 2145

=== Solar eclipses of 2058–2061 ===
This eclipse is a member of a semester series. An eclipse in a semester series of solar eclipses repeats approximately every 177 days and 4 hours (a semester) at alternating nodes of the Moon's orbit.

The partial solar eclipse on June 21, 2058 occurs in the previous lunar year eclipse set.

Solar eclipse series sets from 2058 to 2061
Ascending node			Descending node		
Saros	Map	Gamma	Saros	Map	Gamma
119	May 22, 2058 Partial	−1.3194	124	November 16, 2058 Partial	1.1224
129	May 11, 2059 Total	−0.508	134	November 5, 2059 Annular	0.4454
139	April 30, 2060 Total	0.2422	144	October 24, 2060 Annular	−0.2625
149	April 20, 2061 Total	0.9578	154	October 13, 2061 Annular	−0.9639

=== Saros 119 ===
This eclipse is a part of Saros series 119, repeating every 18 years, 11 days, and containing 71 events. The series started with a partial solar eclipse on May 15, 850 AD. It contains total eclipses on August 9, 994 AD and August 20, 1012; a hybrid eclipse on August 31, 1030; and annular eclipses from September 10, 1048 through March 18, 1950. The series ends at member 71 as a partial eclipse on June 24, 2112. Its eclipses are tabulated in three columns; every third eclipse in the same column is one exeligmos apart, so they all cast shadows over approximately the same parts of the Earth.

The longest duration of totality was produced by member 10 at 32 seconds on August 20, 1012, and the longest duration of annularity was produced by member 44 at 7 minutes, 37 seconds on September 1, 1625. All eclipses in this series occur at the Moon’s ascending node of orbit.

Series members 54–71 occur between 1801 and 2112:
54	55	56
December 21, 1805	January 1, 1824	January 11, 1842
57	58	59
January 23, 1860	February 2, 1878	February 13, 1896
60	61	62
February 25, 1914	March 7, 1932	March 18, 1950
63	64	65
March 28, 1968	April 9, 1986	April 19, 2004
66	67	68
April 30, 2022	May 11, 2040	May 22, 2058
69	70	71
June 1, 2076	June 13, 2094	June 24, 2112

=== Metonic series ===
The metonic series repeats eclipses every 19 years (6939.69 days), lasting about 5 cycles. Eclipses occur in nearly the same calendar date. In addition, the octon subseries repeats 1/5 of that or every 3.8 years (1387.94 days). All eclipses in this table occur at the Moon's ascending node.

23 eclipse events between August 3, 2054 and October 16, 2145
August 3–4	May 22–24	March 10–11	December 27–29	October 14–16
117	119	121	123	125
August 3, 2054	May 22, 2058	March 11, 2062	December 27, 2065	October 15, 2069
127	129	131	133	135
August 3, 2073	May 22, 2077	March 10, 2081	December 27, 2084	October 14, 2088
137	139	141	143	145
August 3, 2092	May 22, 2096	March 10, 2100	December 29, 2103	October 16, 2107
147	149	151	153	155
August 4, 2111	May 24, 2115	March 11, 2119	December 28, 2122	October 16, 2126
157	159	161	163	165
August 4, 2130	May 23, 2134			October 16, 2145

=== Tritos series ===
This eclipse is a part of a tritos cycle, repeating at alternating nodes every 135 synodic months (≈ 3986.63 days, or 11 years minus 1 month). Their appearance and longitude are irregular due to a lack of synchronization with the anomalistic month (period of perigee), but groupings of 3 tritos cycles (≈ 33 years minus 3 months) come close (≈ 434.044 anomalistic months), so eclipses are similar in these groupings.

Series members between 2036 and 2200
July 23, 2036 (Saros 117)	June 23, 2047 (Saros 118)	May 22, 2058 (Saros 119)	April 21, 2069 (Saros 120)	March 21, 2080 (Saros 121)
February 18, 2091 (Saros 122)	January 19, 2102 (Saros 123)	December 19, 2112 (Saros 124)	November 18, 2123 (Saros 125)	October 17, 2134 (Saros 126)
September 16, 2145 (Saros 127)	August 16, 2156 (Saros 128)	July 16, 2167 (Saros 129)	June 16, 2178 (Saros 130)	May 15, 2189 (Saros 131)
April 14, 2200 (Saros 132)

=== Inex series ===
This eclipse is a part of the long period inex cycle, repeating at alternating nodes, every 358 synodic months (≈ 10,571.95 days, or 29 years minus 20 days). Their appearance and longitude are irregular due to a lack of synchronization with the anomalistic month (period of perigee). However, groupings of 3 inex cycles (≈ 87 years minus 2 months) comes close (≈ 1,151.02 anomalistic months), so eclipses are similar in these groupings.

Series members between 1801 and 2200
October 31, 1826 (Saros 111)		
August 31, 1913 (Saros 114)	August 12, 1942 (Saros 115)	July 22, 1971 (Saros 116)
July 1, 2000 (Saros 117)	June 12, 2029 (Saros 118)	May 22, 2058 (Saros 119)
May 2, 2087 (Saros 120)	April 13, 2116 (Saros 121)	March 23, 2145 (Saros 122)
March 3, 2174 (Saros 123)		
