= Solar eclipse of December 17, 2066 =

Total eclipse

- Total eclipse
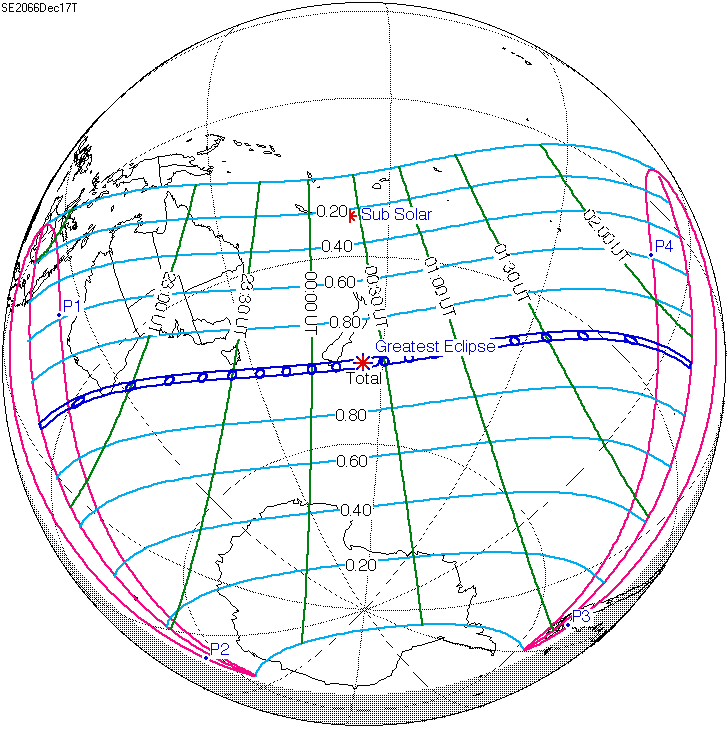
- Map
- Gamma: −0.4043
- Magnitude: 1.0416

Maximum eclipse
- Duration: 194 s (3 min 14 s)
- Coordinates: 47.4°S 175.8°E
- Max. width of band: 152 km (94 mi)

Times (UTC)
- Greatest eclipse: 0:23:40

References
- Saros: 133 (48 of 72)
- Catalog # (SE5000): 9657

A total solar eclipse will occur at the Moon's ascending node of orbit between Thursday, December 16 and Friday, December 17, 2066, with a magnitude of 1.0416. A solar eclipse occurs when the Moon passes between Earth and the Sun, thereby totally or partly obscuring the image of the Sun for a viewer on Earth. A total solar eclipse occurs when the Moon's apparent diameter is larger than the Sun's, blocking all direct sunlight, turning day into darkness. Totality occurs in a narrow path across Earth's surface, with the partial solar eclipse visible over a surrounding region thousands of kilometres wide. Occurring about 18.5 hours before perigee (on December 17, 2066, at 19:00 UTC), the Moon's apparent diameter will be larger.

The path of totality will be visible from parts of southwestern Australia and Stewart Island of New Zealand. A partial solar eclipse will also be visible for parts of Indonesia, Australia, Antarctica, and Oceania.

This total eclipse follows a similar path to the eclipse on December 25–26, 2038.

== Eclipse details ==
Shown below are two tables displaying details about this particular solar eclipse. The first table outlines times at which the Moon's penumbra or umbra attains the specific parameter, and the second table describes various other parameters pertaining to this eclipse.

December 17, 2066 Solar Eclipse Times
Event	Time (UTC)
First Penumbral External Contact	2066 December 16 at 21:49:58.3 UTC
First Umbral External Contact	2066 December 16 at 22:48:21.3 UTC
First Central Line	2066 December 16 at 22:49:05.7 UTC
First Umbral Internal Contact	2066 December 16 at 22:49:50.2 UTC
First Penumbral Internal Contact	2066 December 17 at 00:01:22.6 UTC
Ecliptic Conjunction	2066 December 17 at 00:19:30.7 UTC
Equatorial Conjunction	2066 December 17 at 00:20:59.4 UTC
Greatest Duration	2066 December 17 at 00:23:31.6 UTC
Greatest Eclipse	2066 December 17 at 00:23:39.9 UTC
Last Penumbral Internal Contact	2066 December 17 at 00:46:01.7 UTC
Last Umbral Internal Contact	2066 December 17 at 01:57:30.4 UTC
Last Central Line	2066 December 17 at 01:58:15.8 UTC
Last Umbral External Contact	2066 December 17 at 01:59:01.2 UTC
Last Penumbral External Contact	2066 December 17 at 02:57:20.6 UTC

December 17, 2066 Solar Eclipse Parameters
Parameter	Value
Eclipse Magnitude	1.04155
Eclipse Obscuration	1.08483
Gamma	−0.40428
Sun Right Ascension	17h39m46.4s
Sun Declination	-23°20'56.0"
Sun Semi-Diameter	16'15.1"
Sun Equatorial Horizontal Parallax	08.9"
Moon Right Ascension	17h39m53.3s
Moon Declination	-23°45'32.9"
Moon Semi-Diameter	16'39.9"
Moon Equatorial Horizontal Parallax	1°01'09.6"
ΔT	95.3 s

== Eclipse season ==
This eclipse is part of an eclipse season, a period, roughly every six months, when eclipses occur. Only two (or occasionally three) eclipse seasons occur each year, and each season lasts about 35 days and repeats just short of six months (173 days) later; thus two full eclipse seasons always occur each year. Either two or three eclipses happen each eclipse season. In the sequence below, each eclipse is separated by a fortnight.

Eclipse season of December 2066
December 17 Ascending node (new moon)	December 31 Descending node (full moon)
Total solar eclipse Solar Saros 133	Penumbral lunar eclipse Lunar Saros 145

== Related eclipses ==
=== Eclipses in 2066 ===
- A total lunar eclipse on January 11.
- An annular solar eclipse on June 22.
- A partial lunar eclipse on July 7.
- A total solar eclipse on December 17.
- A penumbral lunar eclipse on December 31.

=== Metonic ===
- Preceded by: Solar eclipse of February 28, 2063
- Followed by: Solar eclipse of October 4, 2070

=== Tzolkinex ===
- Preceded by: Solar eclipse of November 5, 2059
- Followed by: Solar eclipse of January 27, 2074

=== Half-Saros ===
- Preceded by: Lunar eclipse of December 11, 2057
- Followed by: Lunar eclipse of December 22, 2075

=== Tritos ===
- Preceded by: Solar eclipse of January 16, 2056
- Followed by: Solar eclipse of November 15, 2077

=== Solar Saros 133 ===
- Preceded by: Solar eclipse of December 5, 2048
- Followed by: Solar eclipse of December 27, 2084

=== Inex ===
- Preceded by: Solar eclipse of January 5, 2038
- Followed by: Solar eclipse of November 27, 2095

=== Triad ===
- Preceded by: Solar eclipse of February 16, 1980
- Followed by: Solar eclipse of October 17, 2153

=== Solar eclipses of 2065–2069 ===
This eclipse is a member of a semester series. An eclipse in a semester series of solar eclipses repeats approximately every 177 days and 4 hours (a semester) at alternating nodes of the Moon's orbit.

The partial solar eclipses on February 5, 2065 and August 2, 2065 occur in the previous lunar year eclipse set, and the partial solar eclipses on April 21, 2069 and October 15, 2069 occur in the next lunar year eclipse set.

Solar eclipse series sets from 2065 to 2069
Descending node			Ascending node		
Saros	Map	Gamma	Saros	Map	Gamma
118	July 3, 2065 Partial	1.4619	123	December 27, 2065 Partial	−1.0688
128	June 22, 2066 Annular	0.733	133	December 17, 2066 Total	−0.4043
138	June 11, 2067 Annular	−0.0387	143	December 6, 2067 Hybrid	0.2845
148	May 31, 2068 Total	−0.797	153	November 24, 2068 Partial	1.0299
158	May 20, 2069 Partial	−1.4852			

=== Saros 133 ===
This eclipse is a part of Saros series 133, repeating every 18 years, 11 days, and containing 72 events. The series started with a partial solar eclipse on July 13, 1219. It contains annular eclipses from November 20, 1435 through January 13, 1526; a hybrid eclipse on January 24, 1544; and total eclipses from February 3, 1562 through June 21, 2373. The series ends at member 72 as a partial eclipse on September 5, 2499. Its eclipses are tabulated in three columns; every third eclipse in the same column is one exeligmos apart, so they all cast shadows over approximately the same parts of the Earth.

The longest duration of annularity was produced by member 25 at 1 minutes, 14 seconds on November 30, 1453, and the longest duration of totality was produced by member 61 at 6 minutes, 50 seconds on August 7, 1850. All eclipses in this series occur at the Moon’s ascending node of orbit.

Series members 34–55 occur between 1801 and 2200:
34	35	36
July 17, 1814	July 27, 1832	August 7, 1850
37	38	39
August 18, 1868	August 29, 1886	September 9, 1904
40	41	42
September 21, 1922	October 1, 1940	October 12, 1958
43	44	45
October 23, 1976	November 3, 1994	November 13, 2012
46	47	48
November 25, 2030	December 5, 2048	December 17, 2066
49	50	51
December 27, 2084	January 8, 2103	January 19, 2121
52	53	54
January 30, 2139	February 9, 2157	February 21, 2175
55
March 3, 2193

=== Metonic series ===
The metonic series repeats eclipses every 19 years (6939.69 days), lasting about 5 cycles. Eclipses occur in nearly the same calendar date. In addition, the octon subseries repeats 1/5 of that or every 3.8 years (1387.94 days). All eclipses in this table occur at the Moon's ascending node.

21 eclipse events between July 23, 2036 and July 23, 2112
July 23–24	May 11	February 27–28	December 16–17	October 4–5
117	119	121	123	125
July 23, 2036	May 11, 2040	February 28, 2044	December 16, 2047	October 4, 2051
127	129	131	133	135
July 24, 2055	May 11, 2059	February 28, 2063	December 17, 2066	October 4, 2070
137	139	141	143	145
July 24, 2074	May 11, 2078	February 27, 2082	December 16, 2085	October 4, 2089
147	149	151	153	155
July 23, 2093	May 11, 2097	February 28, 2101	December 17, 2104	October 5, 2108
157
July 23, 2112

=== Tritos series ===
This eclipse is a part of a tritos cycle, repeating at alternating nodes every 135 synodic months (≈ 3986.63 days, or 11 years minus 1 month). Their appearance and longitude are irregular due to a lack of synchronization with the anomalistic month (period of perigee), but groupings of 3 tritos cycles (≈ 33 years minus 3 months) come close (≈ 434.044 anomalistic months), so eclipses are similar in these groupings.

Series members between 1801 and 2200
January 1, 1805 (Saros 109)		October 31, 1826 (Saros 111)		August 28, 1848 (Saros 113)
July 29, 1859 (Saros 114)	June 28, 1870 (Saros 115)	May 27, 1881 (Saros 116)	April 26, 1892 (Saros 117)	March 29, 1903 (Saros 118)
February 25, 1914 (Saros 119)	January 24, 1925 (Saros 120)	December 25, 1935 (Saros 121)	November 23, 1946 (Saros 122)	October 23, 1957 (Saros 123)
September 22, 1968 (Saros 124)	August 22, 1979 (Saros 125)	July 22, 1990 (Saros 126)	June 21, 2001 (Saros 127)	May 20, 2012 (Saros 128)
April 20, 2023 (Saros 129)	March 20, 2034 (Saros 130)	February 16, 2045 (Saros 131)	January 16, 2056 (Saros 132)	December 17, 2066 (Saros 133)
November 15, 2077 (Saros 134)	October 14, 2088 (Saros 135)	September 14, 2099 (Saros 136)	August 15, 2110 (Saros 137)	July 14, 2121 (Saros 138)
June 13, 2132 (Saros 139)	May 14, 2143 (Saros 140)	April 12, 2154 (Saros 141)	March 12, 2165 (Saros 142)	February 10, 2176 (Saros 143)
January 9, 2187 (Saros 144)	December 9, 2197 (Saros 145)			

=== Inex series ===
This eclipse is a part of the long period inex cycle, repeating at alternating nodes, every 358 synodic months (≈ 10,571.95 days, or 29 years minus 20 days). Their appearance and longitude are irregular due to a lack of synchronization with the anomalistic month (period of perigee). However, groupings of 3 inex cycles (≈ 87 years minus 2 months) comes close (≈ 1,151.02 anomalistic months), so eclipses are similar in these groupings.

Series members between 1801 and 2200
June 16, 1806 (Saros 124)	May 27, 1835 (Saros 125)	May 6, 1864 (Saros 126)
April 16, 1893 (Saros 127)	March 28, 1922 (Saros 128)	March 7, 1951 (Saros 129)
February 16, 1980 (Saros 130)	January 26, 2009 (Saros 131)	January 5, 2038 (Saros 132)
December 17, 2066 (Saros 133)	November 27, 2095 (Saros 134)	November 6, 2124 (Saros 135)
October 17, 2153 (Saros 136)	September 27, 2182 (Saros 137)	
