= Solar eclipse of May 19, 1928 =

Total eclipse

- Total eclipse
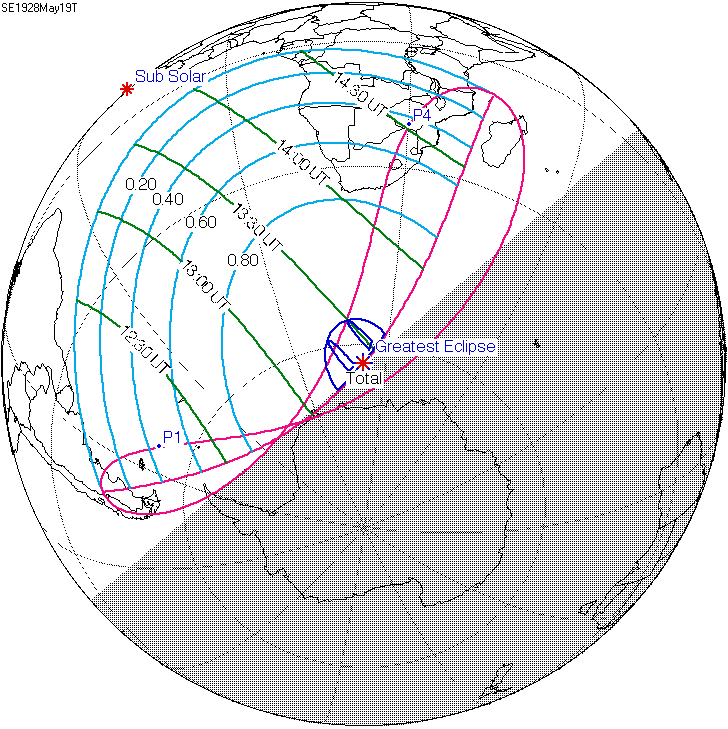
- Map
- Gamma: 1.0048
- Magnitude: 1.014

Maximum eclipse
- Duration: -
- Coordinates: 63.3°S 22.5°E
- Max. width of band: km

Times (UTC)
- Greatest eclipse: 13:24:20

References
- Saros: 117 (64 of 71)
- Catalog # (SE5000): 9347

A total solar eclipse occurred at the Moon's ascending node of orbit on Saturday, May 19, 1928, with a magnitude of 1.014. A solar eclipse occurs when the Moon passes between Earth and the Sun, thereby totally or partly obscuring the image of the Sun for a viewer on Earth. A total solar eclipse occurs when the Moon's apparent diameter is larger than the Sun's, blocking all direct sunlight, turning day into darkness. Totality occurs in a narrow path across Earth's surface, with the partial solar eclipse visible over a surrounding region thousands of kilometres wide. Occurring about 7 hours after perigee (on May 19, 1928, at 6:40 UTC), the Moon's apparent diameter was larger.

This solar eclipse was unusual because it was non-central while being total. While totality was not visible for any land masses, a partial eclipse was visible for extreme southern South America and Southern Africa. This was the last of 56 umbral solar eclipses in Solar Saros 117.

== Eclipse details ==
Shown below are two tables displaying details about this particular solar eclipse. The first table outlines times at which the Moon's penumbra or umbra attains the specific parameter, and the second table describes various other parameters pertaining to this eclipse.

May 19, 1928 Solar Eclipse Times
Event	Time (UTC)
First Penumbral External Contact	1928 May 19 at 11:25:49.0 UTC
Equatorial Conjunction	1928 May 19 at 12:50:01.4 UTC
First Umbral External Contact	1928 May 19 at 13:12:03.1 UTC
Ecliptic Conjunction	1928 May 19 at 13:14:20.1 UTC
Greatest Eclipse	1928 May 19 at 13:24:19.5 UTC
Last Umbral External Contact	1928 May 19 at 13:36:57.4 UTC
Last Penumbral External Contact	1928 May 19 at 15:23:05.0 UTC

May 19, 1928 Solar Eclipse Parameters
Parameter	Value
Eclipse Magnitude	1.01401
Eclipse Obscuration	-
Gamma	−1.00476
Sun Right Ascension	03h44m11.5s
Sun Declination	+19°47'20.4"
Sun Semi-Diameter	15'48.2"
Sun Equatorial Horizontal Parallax	08.7"
Moon Right Ascension	03h45m33.4s
Moon Declination	+18°48'58.4"
Moon Semi-Diameter	16'42.7"
Moon Equatorial Horizontal Parallax	1°01'19.9"
ΔT	24.2 s

== Eclipse season ==
This eclipse is part of an eclipse season, a period, roughly every six months, when eclipses occur. Only two (or occasionally three) eclipse seasons occur each year, and each season lasts about 35 days and repeats just short of six months (173 days) later; thus two full eclipse seasons always occur each year. Either two or three eclipses happen each eclipse season. In the sequence below, each eclipse is separated by a fortnight. The first and last eclipse in this sequence is separated by one synodic month.

Eclipse season of May–June 1928
May 19 Ascending node (new moon)	June 3 Descending node (full moon)	June 17 Ascending node (new moon)
Total solar eclipse Solar Saros 117	Total lunar eclipse Lunar Saros 129	Partial solar eclipse Solar Saros 155

== Related eclipses ==
=== Eclipses in 1928 ===
- A non-central total solar eclipse on May 19.
- A total lunar eclipse on June 3.
- A partial solar eclipse on June 17.
- A partial solar eclipse on November 12.
- A total lunar eclipse on November 27.

=== Metonic ===
- Preceded by: Solar eclipse of July 31, 1924
- Followed by: Solar eclipse of March 7, 1932

=== Tzolkinex ===
- Preceded by: Solar eclipse of April 8, 1921
- Followed by: Solar eclipse of June 30, 1935

=== Half-Saros ===
- Preceded by: Lunar eclipse of May 15, 1919
- Followed by: Lunar eclipse of May 25, 1937

=== Tritos ===
- Preceded by: Solar eclipse of June 19, 1917
- Followed by: Solar eclipse of April 19, 1939

=== Solar Saros 117 ===
- Preceded by: Solar eclipse of May 9, 1910
- Followed by: Solar eclipse of May 30, 1946

=== Inex ===
- Preceded by: Solar eclipse of June 8, 1899
- Followed by: Solar eclipse of April 30, 1957

=== Triad ===
- Preceded by: Solar eclipse of July 18, 1841
- Followed by: Solar eclipse of March 20, 2015

=== Solar eclipses of 1928–1931 ===
This eclipse is a member of a semester series. An eclipse in a semester series of solar eclipses repeats approximately every 177 days and 4 hours (a semester) at alternating nodes of the Moon's orbit.

The partial solar eclipse on June 17, 1928 occurs in the previous lunar year eclipse set, and the partial solar eclipse on September 12, 1931 occurs in the next lunar year eclipse set.

Solar eclipse series sets from 1928 to 1931
Ascending node			Descending node		
Saros	Map	Gamma	Saros	Map	Gamma
117	May 19, 1928 Total (non-central)	1.0048	122	November 12, 1928 Partial	1.0861
127	May 9, 1929 Total	−0.2887	132	November 1, 1929 Annular	0.3514
137	April 28, 1930 Hybrid	0.473	142	October 21, 1930 Total	−0.3804
147	April 18, 1931 Partial	1.2643	152	October 11, 1931 Partial	−1.0607

=== Saros 117 ===
This eclipse is a part of Saros series 117, repeating every 18 years, 11 days, and containing 71 events. The series started with a partial solar eclipse on June 24, 792 AD. It contains annular eclipses from September 18, 936 AD through May 14, 1333; hybrid eclipses from May 25, 1351 through July 8, 1423; and total eclipses from July 18, 1441 through May 19, 1928. The series ends at member 71 as a partial eclipse on August 3, 2054. Its eclipses are tabulated in three columns; every third eclipse in the same column is one exeligmos apart, so they all cast shadows over approximately the same parts of the Earth.

The longest duration of annularity was produced by member 16 at 9 minutes, 26 seconds on December 3, 1062, and the longest duration of totality was produced by member 62 at 4 minutes, 19 seconds on April 26, 1892. All eclipses in this series occur at the Moon’s ascending node of orbit.

Series members 57–71 occur between 1801 and 2054:
57	58	59
March 4, 1802	March 14, 1820	March 25, 1838
60	61	62
April 5, 1856	April 16, 1874	April 26, 1892
63	64	65
May 9, 1910	May 19, 1928	May 30, 1946
66	67	68
June 10, 1964	June 21, 1982	July 1, 2000
69	70	71
July 13, 2018	July 23, 2036	August 3, 2054

=== Metonic series ===
The metonic series repeats eclipses every 19 years (6939.69 days), lasting about 5 cycles. Eclipses occur in nearly the same calendar date. In addition, the octon subseries repeats 1/5 of that or every 3.8 years (1387.94 days). All eclipses in this table occur at the Moon's ascending node.

22 eclipse events between December 24, 1916 and July 31, 2000
December 24–25	October 12	July 31–August 1	May 19–20	March 7
111	113	115	117	119
December 24, 1916		July 31, 1924	May 19, 1928	March 7, 1932
121	123	125	127	129
December 25, 1935	October 12, 1939	August 1, 1943	May 20, 1947	March 7, 1951
131	133	135	137	139
December 25, 1954	October 12, 1958	July 31, 1962	May 20, 1966	March 7, 1970
141	143	145	147	149
December 24, 1973	October 12, 1977	July 31, 1981	May 19, 1985	March 7, 1989
151	153	155		
December 24, 1992	October 12, 1996	July 31, 2000		

=== Tritos series ===
This eclipse is a part of a tritos cycle, repeating at alternating nodes every 135 synodic months (≈ 3986.63 days, or 11 years minus 1 month). Their appearance and longitude are irregular due to a lack of synchronization with the anomalistic month (period of perigee), but groupings of 3 tritos cycles (≈ 33 years minus 3 months) come close (≈ 434.044 anomalistic months), so eclipses are similar in these groupings.

Series members between 1801 and 2200
March 25, 1819 (Saros 107)	February 23, 1830 (Saros 108)	January 22, 1841 (Saros 109)		November 21, 1862 (Saros 111)
		August 20, 1895 (Saros 114)	July 21, 1906 (Saros 115)	June 19, 1917 (Saros 116)
May 19, 1928 (Saros 117)	April 19, 1939 (Saros 118)	March 18, 1950 (Saros 119)	February 15, 1961 (Saros 120)	January 16, 1972 (Saros 121)
December 15, 1982 (Saros 122)	November 13, 1993 (Saros 123)	October 14, 2004 (Saros 124)	September 13, 2015 (Saros 125)	August 12, 2026 (Saros 126)
July 13, 2037 (Saros 127)	June 11, 2048 (Saros 128)	May 11, 2059 (Saros 129)	April 11, 2070 (Saros 130)	March 10, 2081 (Saros 131)
February 7, 2092 (Saros 132)	January 8, 2103 (Saros 133)	December 8, 2113 (Saros 134)	November 6, 2124 (Saros 135)	October 7, 2135 (Saros 136)
September 6, 2146 (Saros 137)	August 5, 2157 (Saros 138)	July 5, 2168 (Saros 139)	June 5, 2179 (Saros 140)	May 4, 2190 (Saros 141)

=== Inex series ===
This eclipse is a part of the long period inex cycle, repeating at alternating nodes, every 358 synodic months (≈ 10,571.95 days, or 29 years minus 20 days). Their appearance and longitude are irregular due to a lack of synchronization with the anomalistic month (period of perigee). However, groupings of 3 inex cycles (≈ 87 years minus 2 months) comes close (≈ 1,151.02 anomalistic months), so eclipses are similar in these groupings.

Series members between 1801 and 2200
August 7, 1812 (Saros 113)	July 18, 1841 (Saros 114)	June 28, 1870 (Saros 115)
June 8, 1899 (Saros 116)	May 19, 1928 (Saros 117)	April 30, 1957 (Saros 118)
April 9, 1986 (Saros 119)	March 20, 2015 (Saros 120)	February 28, 2044 (Saros 121)
February 7, 2073 (Saros 122)	January 19, 2102 (Saros 123)	December 30, 2130 (Saros 124)
December 9, 2159 (Saros 125)	November 18, 2188 (Saros 126)	
