= Solar eclipse of July 15, 2083 =

Future partial solar eclipse

- Partial eclipse
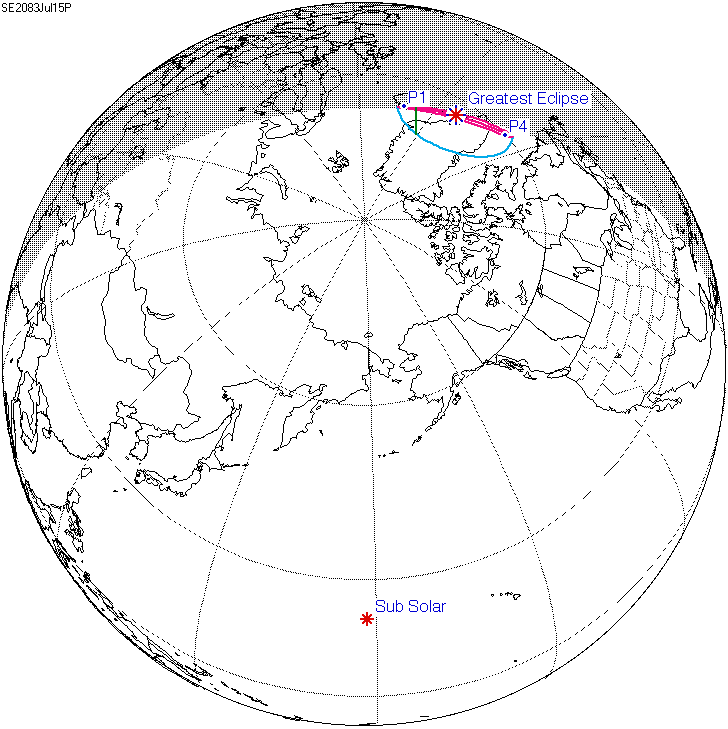
- Map
- Gamma: 1.5465
- Magnitude: 0.0168

Maximum eclipse
- Coordinates: 64°N 37.7°W

Times (UTC)
- Greatest eclipse: 0:14:23

References
- Saros: 118 (72 of 72)
- Catalog # (SE5000): 9695

A partial solar eclipse will occur at the Moon's descending node of orbit between Wednesday, July 14 and Thursday, July 15, 2083, with a magnitude of 0.0168. A solar eclipse occurs when the Moon passes between Earth and the Sun, thereby totally or partly obscuring the image of the Sun for a viewer on Earth. A partial solar eclipse occurs in the polar regions of the Earth when the center of the Moon's shadow misses the Earth.

The partial solar eclipse will be visible for parts of Greenland. This will be the 72nd and final event in Solar Saros 118.

== Eclipse details ==
Shown below are two tables displaying details about this particular solar eclipse. The first table outlines times at which the Moon's penumbra or umbra attains the specific parameter, and the second table describes various other parameters pertaining to this eclipse.

July 15, 2083 Solar Eclipse Times
| Event | Time (UTC) |
|---|---|
| Equatorial Conjunction | 2083 July 14 at 23:26:20.9 UTC |
| First Penumbral External Contact | 2083 July 14 at 23:54:30.0 UTC |
| Ecliptic Conjunction | 2083 July 14 at 23:57:03.5 UTC |
| Greatest Eclipse | 2083 July 15 at 00:14:22.9 UTC |
| Last Penumbral External Contact | 2083 July 15 at 00:34:32.0 UTC |

July 15, 2083 Solar Eclipse Parameters
| Parameter | Value |
|---|---|
| Eclipse Magnitude | 0.01688 |
| Eclipse Obscuration | 0.00260 |
| Gamma | 1.54645 |
| Sun Right Ascension | 07h38m24.0s |
| Sun Declination | +21°30'20.2" |
| Sun Semi-Diameter | 15'44.0" |
| Sun Equatorial Horizontal Parallax | 08.7" |
| Moon Right Ascension | 07h40m00.2s |
| Moon Declination | +22°52'33.7" |
| Moon Semi-Diameter | 15'02.8" |
| Moon Equatorial Horizontal Parallax | 0°55'13.4" |
| ΔT | 108.4 s |

== Eclipse season ==
This eclipse is part of an eclipse season, a period, roughly every six months, when eclipses occur. Only two (or occasionally three) eclipse seasons occur each year, and each season lasts about 35 days and repeats just short of six months (173 days) later; thus two full eclipse seasons always occur each year. Either two or three eclipses happen each eclipse season. In the sequence below, each eclipse is separated by a fortnight. The first and last eclipse in this sequence is separated by one synodic month.

Eclipse season of July–August 2083
| July 15 Descending node (new moon) | July 29 Ascending node (full moon) | August 13 Descending node (new moon) |
|---|---|---|
| Partial solar eclipse Solar Saros 118 | Total lunar eclipse Lunar Saros 130 | Partial solar eclipse Solar Saros 156 |

== Related eclipses ==
=== Eclipses in 2083 ===
- A total lunar eclipse on February 2.
- A partial solar eclipse on February 16.
- A partial solar eclipse on July 15.
- A total lunar eclipse on July 29.
- A partial solar eclipse on August 13.

=== Metonic ===
- Followed by: Solar eclipse of May 2, 2087

=== Tzolkinex ===
- Preceded by: Solar eclipse of June 1, 2076

=== Half-Saros ===
- Preceded by: Lunar eclipse of July 8, 2074
- Followed by: Lunar eclipse of July 19, 2092

=== Tritos ===
- Followed by: Solar eclipse of June 13, 2094

=== Solar Saros 118 ===
- Preceded by: Solar eclipse of July 3, 2065

=== Inex ===
- Preceded by: Solar eclipse of August 3, 2054
- Followed by: Solar eclipse of June 24, 2112

=== Triad ===
- Followed by: Solar eclipse of May 16, 2170

=== Solar eclipses of 2083–2087 ===
This eclipse is a member of a semester series. An eclipse in a semester series of solar eclipses repeats approximately every 177 days and 4 hours (a semester) at alternating nodes of the Moon's orbit.

The partial solar eclipses on February 16, 2083 and August 13, 2083 occur in the previous lunar year eclipse set, and the partial solar eclipses on May 2, 2087 and October 26, 2087 occur in the next lunar year eclipse set.

Solar eclipse series sets from 2083 to 2087
| Descending node | | | Ascending node | | |
| Saros | Map | Gamma | Saros | Map | Gamma |
| 118 | July 15, 2083 Partial | 1.5465 | 123 | January 7, 2084 Partial | −1.0715 |
| 128 | July 3, 2084 Annular | 0.8208 | 133 | December 27, 2084 Total | −0.4094 |
| 138 | June 22, 2085 Annular | 0.0452 | 143 | December 16, 2085 Annular | 0.2786 |
| 148 | June 11, 2086 Total | −0.7215 | 153 | December 6, 2086 Partial | 1.0194 |
| 158 | June 1, 2087 Partial | −1.4186 | | | |

=== Saros 118 ===
This eclipse is a part of Saros series 118, repeating every 18 years, 11 days, and containing 72 events. The series started with a partial solar eclipse on May 24, 803 AD. It contains total eclipses from August 19, 947 AD through October 25, 1650; hybrid eclipses on November 4, 1668 and November 15, 1686; and annular eclipses from November 27, 1704 through April 30, 1957. The series ends at member 72 as a partial eclipse on July 15, 2083. Its eclipses are tabulated in three columns; every third eclipse in the same column is one exeligmos apart, so they all cast shadows over approximately the same parts of the Earth.

The longest duration of totality was produced by member 34 at 6 minutes, 59 seconds on May 16, 1398, and the longest duration of annularity was produced by member 59 at 1 minutes, 58 seconds on February 23, 1849. All eclipses in this series occur at the Moon’s descending node of orbit.

Series members 57–72 occur between 1801 and 2083:
| 57 | 58 | 59 |
|---|---|---|
| February 1, 1813 | February 12, 1831 | February 23, 1849 |
| 60 | 61 | 62 |
| March 6, 1867 | March 16, 1885 | March 29, 1903 |
| 63 | 64 | 65 |
| April 8, 1921 | April 19, 1939 | April 30, 1957 |
| 66 | 67 | 68 |
| May 11, 1975 | May 21, 1993 | June 1, 2011 |
| 69 | 70 | 71 |
| June 12, 2029 | June 23, 2047 | July 3, 2065 |
72
July 15, 2083

=== Metonic series ===
The metonic series repeats eclipses every 19 years (6939.69 days), lasting about 5 cycles. Eclipses occur in nearly the same calendar date. In addition, the octon subseries repeats 1/5 of that or every 3.8 years (1387.94 days). All eclipses in this table occur at the Moon's descending node.

22 eclipse events between July 15, 2083 and December 7, 2170
| July 14–15 | May 2–3 | February 18–19 | December 7–8 | September 25–26 |
| 118 | 120 | 122 | 124 | 126 |
|---|---|---|---|---|
| July 15, 2083 | May 2, 2087 | February 18, 2091 | December 7, 2094 | September 25, 2098 |
| 128 | 130 | 132 | 134 | 136 |
| July 15, 2102 | May 3, 2106 | February 18, 2110 | December 8, 2113 | September 26, 2117 |
| 138 | 140 | 142 | 144 | 146 |
| July 14, 2121 | May 3, 2125 | February 18, 2129 | December 7, 2132 | September 26, 2136 |
| 148 | 150 | 152 | 154 | 156 |
| July 14, 2140 | May 3, 2144 | February 19, 2148 | December 8, 2151 | September 26, 2155 |
| 158 | 160 | 162 | 164 | |
| July 15, 2159 | | | December 7, 2170 | |

=== Tritos series ===
This eclipse is a part of a tritos cycle, repeating at alternating nodes every 135 synodic months (≈ 3986.63 days, or 11 years minus 1 month). Their appearance and longitude are irregular due to a lack of synchronization with the anomalistic month (period of perigee), but groupings of 3 tritos cycles (≈ 33 years minus 3 months) come close (≈ 434.044 anomalistic months), so eclipses are similar in these groupings.

Series members between 2083 and 2200
| July 15, 2083 (Saros 118) | June 13, 2094 (Saros 119) | May 14, 2105 (Saros 120) | April 13, 2116 (Saros 121) | March 13, 2127 (Saros 122) |
| February 9, 2138 (Saros 123) | January 9, 2149 (Saros 124) | December 9, 2159 (Saros 125) | November 8, 2170 (Saros 126) | October 8, 2181 (Saros 127) |
September 6, 2192 (Saros 128)

=== Inex series ===
This eclipse is a part of the long period inex cycle, repeating at alternating nodes, every 358 synodic months (≈ 10,571.95 days, or 29 years minus 20 days). Their appearance and longitude are irregular due to a lack of synchronization with the anomalistic month (period of perigee). However, groupings of 3 inex cycles (≈ 87 years minus 2 months) comes close (≈ 1,151.02 anomalistic months), so eclipses are similar in these groupings.

The partial solar eclipses on January 12, 1823 (part of Saros 109) and December 2, 1880 (part of Saros 111) are also a part of this series but are not included in the table below.

Series members between 2054 and 2200
| August 3, 2054 (Saros 117) | July 15, 2083 (Saros 118) | June 24, 2112 (Saros 119) |
| June 4, 2141 (Saros 120) | May 16, 2170 (Saros 121) | April 25, 2199 (Saros 122) |
