= Solar eclipse of April 30, 1957 =

20th-century annular solar eclipse

- Annular eclipse
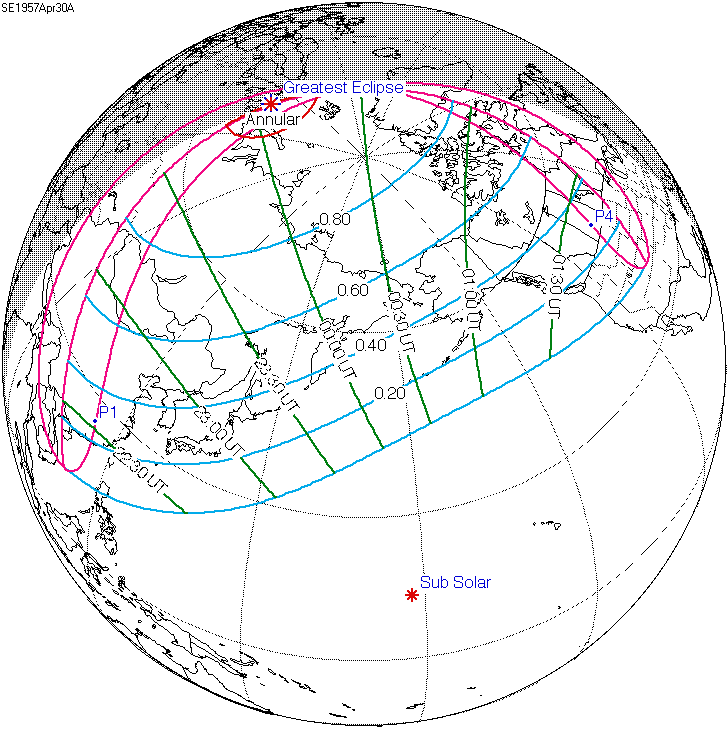
- Map
- Gamma: 0.9992
- Magnitude: 0.9799

Maximum eclipse
- Duration: -
- Coordinates: 70.6°N 40.3°E
- Max. width of band: km

Times (UTC)
- Greatest eclipse: 0:05:28

References
- Saros: 118 (65 of 72)
- Catalog # (SE5000): 9414

An annular solar eclipse occurred at the Moon's descending node of orbit on Tuesday, April 30, 1957, with a magnitude of 9.9799. A solar eclipse occurs when the Moon passes between Earth and the Sun, thereby totally or partly obscuring the image of the Sun for a viewer on Earth. An annular solar eclipse occurs when the Moon's apparent diameter is smaller than the Sun's, blocking most of the Sun's light and causing the Sun to look like an annulus (ring). An annular eclipse appears as a partial eclipse over a region of the Earth thousands of kilometres wide. Occurring about 6.1 days after apogee (on April 23, 1957, at 22:20 UTC), the Moon's apparent diameter was smaller.

It was unusual in that while it was an annular solar eclipse, it was not a central solar eclipse. A non-central annular eclipse is one where the center-line of annularity does not intersect the surface of the Earth (when the gamma is between 0.99972 and 1.00260). Instead, the center line passed just above the Earth's surface. This rare type occurs when annularity is only visible at sunset or sunrise in a polar region.

Annularity was visible from northern Soviet Union (today's Russia) and Bear Island, the southernmost island of Svalbard, Norway. A partial eclipse was visible for parts of East Asia, Northeast Asia, Territory of Alaska, Canada, and the Northwestern United States. This was the last of 57 umbral eclipses in Solar Saros 118.

== Eclipse details ==
Shown below are two tables displaying details about this particular solar eclipse. The first table outlines times at which the Moon's penumbra or umbra attains the specific parameter, and the second table describes various other parameters pertaining to this eclipse.

April 30, 1957 Solar Eclipse Times
Event	Time (UTC)
First Penumbral External Contact	1957 April 29 at 21:50:57.6 UTC
First Umbral External Contact	1957 April 29 at 23:51:50.2 UTC
Ecliptic Conjunction	1957 April 29 at 23:54:18.0 UTC
Greatest Eclipse	1957 April 30 at 00:05:27.8 UTC
Last Umbral External Contact	1957 April 30 at 00:18:44.0 UTC
Equatorial Conjunction	1957 April 30 at 00:31:13.8 UTC
Last Penumbral External Contact	1957 April 30 at 02:19:40.2 UTC

April 30, 1957 Solar Eclipse Parameters
Parameter	Value
Eclipse Magnitude	0.97988
Eclipse Obscuration	-
Gamma	0.99918
Sun Right Ascension	02h27m57.4s
Sun Declination	+14°37'21.8"
Sun Semi-Diameter	15'52.5"
Sun Equatorial Horizontal Parallax	08.7"
Moon Right Ascension	02h27m05.4s
Moon Declination	+15°32'09.0"
Moon Semi-Diameter	15'22.0"
Moon Equatorial Horizontal Parallax	0°56'23.9"
ΔT	31.8 s

== Eclipse season ==
This eclipse is part of an eclipse season, a period, roughly every six months, when eclipses occur. Only two (or occasionally three) eclipse seasons occur each year, and each season lasts about 35 days and repeats just short of six months (173 days) later; thus two full eclipse seasons always occur each year. Either two or three eclipses happen each eclipse season. In the sequence below, each eclipse is separated by a fortnight.

Eclipse season of April–May 1957
April 30 Descending node (new moon)	May 13 Ascending node (full moon)
Annular solar eclipse Solar Saros 118	Total lunar eclipse Lunar Saros 130

== Related eclipses ==
=== Eclipses in 1957 ===
- A non-central annular solar eclipse on April 30.
- A total lunar eclipse on May 13.
- A non-central total solar eclipse on October 23.
- A total lunar eclipse on November 7.

=== Metonic ===
- Preceded by: Solar eclipse of July 11, 1953
- Followed by: Solar eclipse of February 15, 1961

=== Tzolkinex ===
- Preceded by: Solar eclipse of March 18, 1950
- Followed by: Solar eclipse of June 10, 1964

=== Half-Saros ===
- Preceded by: Lunar eclipse of April 23, 1948
- Followed by: Lunar eclipse of May 4, 1966

=== Tritos ===
- Preceded by: Solar eclipse of May 30, 1946
- Followed by: Solar eclipse of March 28, 1968

=== Solar Saros 118 ===
- Preceded by: Solar eclipse of April 19, 1939
- Followed by: Solar eclipse of May 11, 1975

=== Inex ===
- Preceded by: Solar eclipse of May 19, 1928
- Followed by: Solar eclipse of April 9, 1986

=== Triad ===
- Preceded by: Solar eclipse of June 28, 1870
- Followed by: Solar eclipse of February 28, 2044

=== Solar eclipses of 1957–1960 ===
This eclipse is a member of a semester series. An eclipse in a semester series of solar eclipses repeats approximately every 177 days and 4 hours (a semester) at alternating nodes of the Moon's orbit.

Solar eclipse series sets from 1957 to 1960
Descending node			Ascending node		
Saros	Map	Gamma	Saros	Map	Gamma
118	April 30, 1957 Annular (non-central)	0.9992	123	October 23, 1957 Total (non-central)	1.0022
128	April 19, 1958 Annular	0.275	133	October 12, 1958 Total	−0.2951
138	April 8, 1959 Annular	−0.4546	143	October 2, 1959 Total	0.4207
148	March 27, 1960 Partial	−1.1537	153	September 20, 1960 Partial	1.2057

=== Saros 118 ===
This eclipse is a part of Saros series 118, repeating every 18 years, 11 days, and containing 72 events. The series started with a partial solar eclipse on May 24, 803 AD. It contains total eclipses from August 19, 947 AD through October 25, 1650; hybrid eclipses on November 4, 1668 and November 15, 1686; and annular eclipses from November 27, 1704 through April 30, 1957. The series ends at member 72 as a partial eclipse on July 15, 2083. Its eclipses are tabulated in three columns; every third eclipse in the same column is one exeligmos apart, so they all cast shadows over approximately the same parts of the Earth.

The longest duration of totality was produced by member 34 at 6 minutes, 59 seconds on May 16, 1398, and the longest duration of annularity was produced by member 59 at 1 minutes, 58 seconds on February 23, 1849. All eclipses in this series occur at the Moon’s descending node of orbit.

Series members 57–72 occur between 1801 and 2083:
57	58	59
February 1, 1813	February 12, 1831	February 23, 1849
60	61	62
March 6, 1867	March 16, 1885	March 29, 1903
63	64	65
April 8, 1921	April 19, 1939	April 30, 1957
66	67	68
May 11, 1975	May 21, 1993	June 1, 2011
69	70	71
June 12, 2029	June 23, 2047	July 3, 2065
72
July 15, 2083

=== Metonic series ===
The metonic series repeats eclipses every 19 years (6939.69 days), lasting about 5 cycles. Eclipses occur in nearly the same calendar date. In addition, the octon subseries repeats 1/5 of that or every 3.8 years (1387.94 days). All eclipses in this table occur at the Moon's descending node.

21 eclipse events between July 11, 1953 and July 11, 2029
July 10–11	April 29–30	February 15–16	December 4	September 21–23
116	118	120	122	124
July 11, 1953	April 30, 1957	February 15, 1961	December 4, 1964	September 22, 1968
126	128	130	132	134
July 10, 1972	April 29, 1976	February 16, 1980	December 4, 1983	September 23, 1987
136	138	140	142	144
July 11, 1991	April 29, 1995	February 16, 1999	December 4, 2002	September 22, 2006
146	148	150	152	154
July 11, 2010	April 29, 2014	February 15, 2018	December 4, 2021	September 21, 2025
156
July 11, 2029

=== Tritos series ===
This eclipse is a part of a tritos cycle, repeating at alternating nodes every 135 synodic months (≈ 3986.63 days, or 11 years minus 1 month). Their appearance and longitude are irregular due to a lack of synchronization with the anomalistic month (period of perigee), but groupings of 3 tritos cycles (≈ 33 years minus 3 months) come close (≈ 434.044 anomalistic months), so eclipses are similar in these groupings.

Series members between 1837 and 2200
April 5, 1837 (Saros 107)	March 5, 1848 (Saros 108)	February 3, 1859 (Saros 109)		December 2, 1880 (Saros 111)
		August 31, 1913 (Saros 114)	July 31, 1924 (Saros 115)	June 30, 1935 (Saros 116)
May 30, 1946 (Saros 117)	April 30, 1957 (Saros 118)	March 28, 1968 (Saros 119)	February 26, 1979 (Saros 120)	January 26, 1990 (Saros 121)
December 25, 2000 (Saros 122)	November 25, 2011 (Saros 123)	October 25, 2022 (Saros 124)	September 23, 2033 (Saros 125)	August 23, 2044 (Saros 126)
July 24, 2055 (Saros 127)	June 22, 2066 (Saros 128)	May 22, 2077 (Saros 129)	April 21, 2088 (Saros 130)	March 21, 2099 (Saros 131)
February 18, 2110 (Saros 132)	January 19, 2121 (Saros 133)	December 19, 2131 (Saros 134)	November 17, 2142 (Saros 135)	October 17, 2153 (Saros 136)
September 16, 2164 (Saros 137)	August 16, 2175 (Saros 138)	July 16, 2186 (Saros 139)	June 15, 2197 (Saros 140)	

=== Inex series ===
This eclipse is a part of the long period inex cycle, repeating at alternating nodes, every 358 synodic months (≈ 10,571.95 days, or 29 years minus 20 days). Their appearance and longitude are irregular due to a lack of synchronization with the anomalistic month (period of perigee). However, groupings of 3 inex cycles (≈ 87 years minus 2 months) comes close (≈ 1,151.02 anomalistic months), so eclipses are similar in these groupings.

Series members between 1801 and 2200
August 7, 1812 (Saros 113)	July 18, 1841 (Saros 114)	June 28, 1870 (Saros 115)
June 8, 1899 (Saros 116)	May 19, 1928 (Saros 117)	April 30, 1957 (Saros 118)
April 9, 1986 (Saros 119)	March 20, 2015 (Saros 120)	February 28, 2044 (Saros 121)
February 7, 2073 (Saros 122)	January 19, 2102 (Saros 123)	December 30, 2130 (Saros 124)
December 9, 2159 (Saros 125)	November 18, 2188 (Saros 126)	
