= Solar eclipse of July 3, 2065 =

Future partial solar eclipse

- Partial eclipse
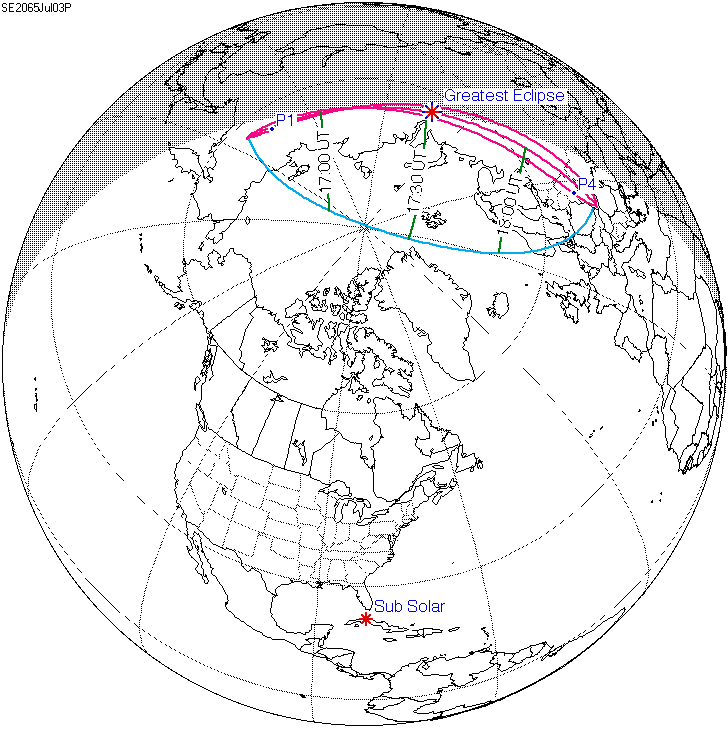
- Map
- Gamma: 1.4619
- Magnitude: 0.1638

Maximum eclipse
- Coordinates: 64.8°N 71.9°E

Times (UTC)
- Greatest eclipse: 17:33:52

References
- Saros: 118 (71 of 72)
- Catalog # (SE5000): 9654

A partial solar eclipse will occur at the Moon's descending node of orbit on Friday, July 3, 2065, with a magnitude of 0.1638. A solar eclipse occurs when the Moon passes between Earth and the Sun, thereby totally or partly obscuring the image of the Sun for a viewer on Earth. A partial solar eclipse occurs in the polar regions of the Earth when the center of the Moon's shadow misses the Earth.

This will be the second of four partial solar eclipses in 2065, with the others occurring on February 5, August 2, and December 27.

The partial solar eclipse will be visible for parts of Northern Europe and northern Russia.

== Eclipse details ==
Shown below are two tables displaying details about this particular solar eclipse. The first table outlines times at which the Moon's penumbra or umbra attains the specific parameter, and the second table describes various other parameters pertaining to this eclipse.

July 3, 2065 Solar Eclipse Times
Event	Time (UTC)
First Penumbral External Contact	2065 July 3 at 16:32:44.5 UTC
Equatorial Conjunction	2065 July 3 at 17:01:37.1 UTC
Ecliptic Conjunction	2065 July 3 at 17:17:29.5 UTC
Greatest Eclipse	2065 July 3 at 17:33:52.5 UTC
Last Penumbral External Contact	2065 July 3 at 18:35:10.0 UTC

July 3, 2065 Solar Eclipse Parameters
Parameter	Value
Eclipse Magnitude	0.16388
Eclipse Obscuration	0.07678
Gamma	1.46186
Sun Right Ascension	06h53m43.9s
Sun Declination	+22°51'26.7"
Sun Semi-Diameter	15'43.9"
Sun Equatorial Horizontal Parallax	08.6"
Moon Right Ascension	06h54m50.6s
Moon Declination	+24°10'43.8"
Moon Semi-Diameter	15'05.3"
Moon Equatorial Horizontal Parallax	0°55'22.6"
ΔT	94.2 s

== Eclipse season ==
This eclipse is part of an eclipse season, a period, roughly every six months, when eclipses occur. Only two (or occasionally three) eclipse seasons occur each year, and each season lasts about 35 days and repeats just short of six months (173 days) later; thus two full eclipse seasons always occur each year. Either two or three eclipses happen each eclipse season. In the sequence below, each eclipse is separated by a fortnight. The first and last eclipse in this sequence is separated by one synodic month.

Eclipse season of July–August 2065
July 3 Descending node (new moon)	July 17 Ascending node (full moon)	August 2 Descending node (new moon)
Partial solar eclipse Solar Saros 118	Total lunar eclipse Lunar Saros 130	Partial solar eclipse Solar Saros 156

== Related eclipses ==
=== Eclipses in 2065 ===
- A total lunar eclipse on January 22.
- A partial solar eclipse on February 5.
- A partial solar eclipse on July 3.
- A total lunar eclipse on July 17.
- A partial solar eclipse on August 2.
- A partial solar eclipse on December 27.

=== Metonic ===
- Followed by: Solar eclipse of April 21, 2069

=== Tzolkinex ===
- Preceded by: Solar eclipse of May 22, 2058

=== Half-Saros ===
- Preceded by: Lunar eclipse of June 27, 2056
- Followed by: Lunar eclipse of July 8, 2074

=== Tritos ===
- Preceded by: Solar eclipse of August 3, 2054
- Followed by: Solar eclipse of June 1, 2076

=== Solar Saros 118 ===
- Preceded by: Solar eclipse of June 23, 2047
- Followed by: Solar eclipse of July 15, 2083

=== Inex ===
- Preceded by: Solar eclipse of July 23, 2036
- Followed by: Solar eclipse of June 13, 2094

=== Triad ===
- Followed by: Solar eclipse of May 4, 2152

=== Solar eclipses of 2065–2069 ===
This eclipse is a member of a semester series. An eclipse in a semester series of solar eclipses repeats approximately every 177 days and 4 hours (a semester) at alternating nodes of the Moon's orbit.

The partial solar eclipses on February 5, 2065 and August 2, 2065 occur in the previous lunar year eclipse set, and the partial solar eclipses on April 21, 2069 and October 15, 2069 occur in the next lunar year eclipse set.

Solar eclipse series sets from 2065 to 2069
Descending node			Ascending node		
Saros	Map	Gamma	Saros	Map	Gamma
118	July 3, 2065 Partial	1.4619	123	December 27, 2065 Partial	−1.0688
128	June 22, 2066 Annular	0.733	133	December 17, 2066 Total	−0.4043
138	June 11, 2067 Annular	−0.0387	143	December 6, 2067 Hybrid	0.2845
148	May 31, 2068 Total	−0.797	153	November 24, 2068 Partial	1.0299
158	May 20, 2069 Partial	−1.4852			

=== Saros 118 ===
This eclipse is a part of Saros series 118, repeating every 18 years, 11 days, and containing 72 events. The series started with a partial solar eclipse on May 24, 803 AD. It contains total eclipses from August 19, 947 AD through October 25, 1650; hybrid eclipses on November 4, 1668 and November 15, 1686; and annular eclipses from November 27, 1704 through April 30, 1957. The series ends at member 72 as a partial eclipse on July 15, 2083. Its eclipses are tabulated in three columns; every third eclipse in the same column is one exeligmos apart, so they all cast shadows over approximately the same parts of the Earth.

The longest duration of totality was produced by member 34 at 6 minutes, 59 seconds on May 16, 1398, and the longest duration of annularity was produced by member 59 at 1 minutes, 58 seconds on February 23, 1849. All eclipses in this series occur at the Moon’s descending node of orbit.

Series members 57–72 occur between 1801 and 2083:
57	58	59
February 1, 1813	February 12, 1831	February 23, 1849
60	61	62
March 6, 1867	March 16, 1885	March 29, 1903
63	64	65
April 8, 1921	April 19, 1939	April 30, 1957
66	67	68
May 11, 1975	May 21, 1993	June 1, 2011
69	70	71
June 12, 2029	June 23, 2047	July 3, 2065
72
July 15, 2083

=== Metonic series ===
The metonic series repeats eclipses every 19 years (6939.69 days), lasting about 5 cycles. Eclipses occur in nearly the same calendar date. In addition, the octon subseries repeats 1/5 of that or every 3.8 years (1387.94 days). All eclipses in this table occur at the Moon's descending node.

22 eclipse events between July 3, 2065 and November 26, 2152
July 3–4	April 21–23	February 7–8	November 26–27	September 13–15
118	120	122	124	126
July 3, 2065	April 21, 2069	February 7, 2073	November 26, 2076	September 13, 2080
128	130	132	134	136
July 3, 2084	April 21, 2088	February 7, 2092	November 27, 2095	September 14, 2099
138	140	142	144	146
July 4, 2103	April 23, 2107	February 8, 2111	November 27, 2114	September 15, 2118
148	150	152	154	156
July 4, 2122	April 22, 2126	February 8, 2130	November 26, 2133	September 15, 2137
158	160	162	164	
July 3, 2141			November 26, 2152	

=== Tritos series ===
This eclipse is a part of a tritos cycle, repeating at alternating nodes every 135 synodic months (≈ 3986.63 days, or 11 years minus 1 month). Their appearance and longitude are irregular due to a lack of synchronization with the anomalistic month (period of perigee), but groupings of 3 tritos cycles (≈ 33 years minus 3 months) come close (≈ 434.044 anomalistic months), so eclipses are similar in these groupings.

Series members between 2054 and 2200
August 3, 2054 (Saros 117)	July 3, 2065 (Saros 118)	June 1, 2076 (Saros 119)	May 2, 2087 (Saros 120)	April 1, 2098 (Saros 121)
March 1, 2109 (Saros 122)	January 30, 2120 (Saros 123)	December 30, 2130 (Saros 124)	November 28, 2141 (Saros 125)	October 28, 2152 (Saros 126)
September 28, 2163 (Saros 127)	August 27, 2174 (Saros 128)	July 26, 2185 (Saros 129)	June 26, 2196 (Saros 130)	

=== Inex series ===
This eclipse is a part of the long period inex cycle, repeating at alternating nodes, every 358 synodic months (≈ 10,571.95 days, or 29 years minus 20 days). Their appearance and longitude are irregular due to a lack of synchronization with the anomalistic month (period of perigee). However, groupings of 3 inex cycles (≈ 87 years minus 2 months) comes close (≈ 1,151.02 anomalistic months), so eclipses are similar in these groupings.

The partial solar eclipses on January 1, 1805 (part of Saros 109) and November 21, 1862 (part of Saros 111) are also a part of this series but are not included in the table below.

Series members between 2036 and 2200
July 23, 2036 (Saros 117)	July 3, 2065 (Saros 118)	June 13, 2094 (Saros 119)
May 25, 2123 (Saros 120)	May 4, 2152 (Saros 121)	April 14, 2181 (Saros 122)
