= Solar eclipse of January 16, 2056 =

Future annular solar eclipse

- Annular eclipse
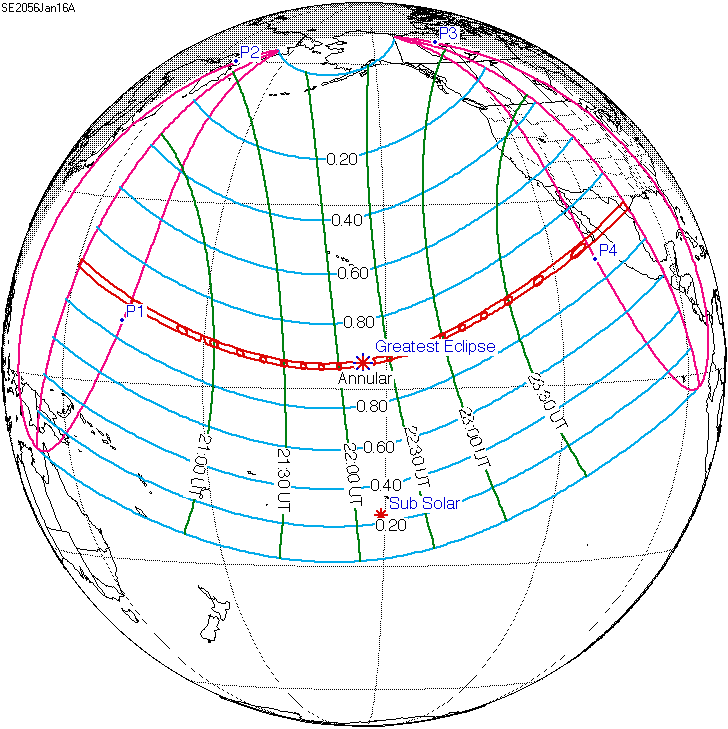
- Map
- Gamma: 0.4199
- Magnitude: 0.9759

Maximum eclipse
- Duration: 172 s (2 min 52 s)
- Coordinates: 3.9°N 153.5°W
- Max. width of band: 95 km (59 mi)

Times (UTC)
- Greatest eclipse: 22:16:45

References
- Saros: 132 (48 of 71)
- Catalog # (SE5000): 9632

An annular solar eclipse will occur at the Moon's descending node of orbit between Sunday, January 16 and Monday, January 17, 2056, with a magnitude of 0.9759. A solar eclipse occurs when the Moon passes between Earth and the Sun, thereby totally or partly obscuring the image of the Sun for a viewer on Earth. An annular solar eclipse occurs when the Moon's apparent diameter is smaller than the Sun's, blocking most of the Sun's light and causing the Sun to look like an annulus (ring). An annular eclipse appears as a partial eclipse over a region of the Earth thousands of kilometres wide. The Moon's apparent diameter will be near the average diameter because it will occur 6.25 days after perigee (on January 10, 2056, at 16:50 UTC) and 7.2 days before apogee (on January 24, 2056, at 2:20 UTC).

The path of annularity will be visible from parts of the Marshall Islands, northern Mexico, and Texas. A partial solar eclipse will also be visible for parts of Oceania, Hawaii, western and central North America, and Central America.

== Eclipse details ==
Shown below are two tables displaying details about this particular solar eclipse. The first table outlines times at which the Moon's penumbra or umbra attains the specific parameter, and the second table describes various other parameters pertaining to this eclipse.

January 16, 2056 Solar Eclipse Times
Event	Time (UTC)
First Penumbral External Contact	2056 January 16 at 19:30:21.0 UTC
First Umbral External Contact	2056 January 16 at 20:34:43.8 UTC
First Central Line	2056 January 16 at 20:36:03.0 UTC
First Umbral Internal Contact	2056 January 16 at 20:37:22.3 UTC
First Penumbral Internal Contact	2056 January 16 at 22:02:03.4 UTC
Ecliptic Conjunction	2056 January 16 at 22:12:06.7 UTC
Greatest Eclipse	2056 January 16 at 22:16:45.2 UTC
Greatest Duration	2056 January 16 at 22:20:15.4 UTC
Equatorial Conjunction	2056 January 16 at 22:21:03.0 UTC
Last Penumbral Internal Contact	2056 January 16 at 22:31:18.8 UTC
Last Umbral Internal Contact	2056 January 16 at 23:56:02.7 UTC
Last Central Line	2056 January 16 at 23:57:25.0 UTC
Last Umbral External Contact	2056 January 16 at 23:58:47.2 UTC
Last Penumbral External Contact	2056 January 17 at 01:03:13.9 UTC

January 16, 2056 Solar Eclipse Parameters
Parameter	Value
Eclipse Magnitude	0.97595
Eclipse Obscuration	0.95248
Gamma	0.41993
Sun Right Ascension	19h54m06.4s
Sun Declination	-20°50'41.3"
Sun Semi-Diameter	16'15.5"
Sun Equatorial Horizontal Parallax	08.9"
Moon Right Ascension	19h53m57.0s
Moon Declination	-20°26'45.0"
Moon Semi-Diameter	15'38.4"
Moon Equatorial Horizontal Parallax	0°57'23.8"
ΔT	87.8 s

== Eclipse season ==
This eclipse is part of an eclipse season, a period, roughly every six months, when eclipses occur. Only two (or occasionally three) eclipse seasons occur each year, and each season lasts about 35 days and repeats just short of six months (173 days) later; thus two full eclipse seasons always occur each year. Either two or three eclipses happen each eclipse season. In the sequence below, each eclipse is separated by a fortnight.

Eclipse season of January–February 2056
January 16 Descending node (new moon)	February 1 Ascending node (full moon)
Annular solar eclipse Solar Saros 132	Penumbral lunar eclipse Lunar Saros 144

== Related eclipses ==
=== Eclipses in 2056 ===
- An annular solar eclipse on January 16.
- A penumbral lunar eclipse on February 1.
- A penumbral lunar eclipse on June 27.
- An annular solar eclipse on July 12.
- A penumbral lunar eclipse on July 26.
- A penumbral lunar eclipse on December 22.

=== Metonic ===
- Preceded by: Solar eclipse of March 30, 2052
- Followed by: Solar eclipse of November 5, 2059

=== Tzolkinex ===
- Preceded by: Solar eclipse of December 5, 2048
- Followed by: Solar eclipse of February 28, 2063

=== Half-Saros ===
- Preceded by: Lunar eclipse of January 12, 2047
- Followed by: Lunar eclipse of January 22, 2065

=== Tritos ===
- Preceded by: Solar eclipse of February 16, 2045
- Followed by: Solar eclipse of December 17, 2066

=== Solar Saros 132 ===
- Preceded by: Solar eclipse of January 5, 2038
- Followed by: Solar eclipse of January 27, 2074

=== Inex ===
- Preceded by: Solar eclipse of February 6, 2027
- Followed by: Solar eclipse of December 27, 2084

=== Triad ===
- Preceded by: Solar eclipse of March 18, 1969
- Followed by: Solar eclipse of November 17, 2142

=== Solar eclipses of 2054–2058 ===
This eclipse is a member of a semester series. An eclipse in a semester series of solar eclipses repeats approximately every 177 days and 4 hours (a semester) at alternating nodes of the Moon's orbit.

The partial solar eclipses on March 9, 2054 and September 2, 2054 occur in the previous lunar year eclipse set, and the partial solar eclipses on May 22, 2058 and November 16, 2058 occur in the next lunar year eclipse set.

Solar eclipse series sets from 2054 to 2058
Ascending node			Descending node		
Saros	Map	Gamma	Saros	Map	Gamma
117	August 3, 2054 Partial	−1.4941	122	January 27, 2055 Partial	1.155
127	July 24, 2055 Total	−0.8012	132	January 16, 2056 Annular	0.4199
137	July 12, 2056 Annular	−0.0426	142	January 5, 2057 Total	−0.2837
147	July 1, 2057 Annular	0.7455	152	December 26, 2057 Total	−0.9405
157	June 21, 2058 Partial	1.4869			

=== Saros 132 ===
This eclipse is a part of Saros series 132, repeating every 18 years, 11 days, and containing 71 events. The series started with a partial solar eclipse on August 13, 1208. It contains annular eclipses from March 17, 1569 through March 12, 2146; hybrid eclipses on March 23, 2164 and April 3, 2182; and total eclipses from April 14, 2200 through June 19, 2308. The series ends at member 71 as a partial eclipse on September 25, 2470. Its eclipses are tabulated in three columns; every third eclipse in the same column is one exeligmos apart, so they all cast shadows over approximately the same parts of the Earth.

The longest duration of annularity was produced by member 25 at 6 minutes, 56 seconds on May 9, 1641, and the longest duration of totality will be produced by member 61 at 2 minutes, 14 seconds on June 8, 2290. All eclipses in this series occur at the Moon’s descending node of orbit.

Series members 34–56 occur between 1801 and 2200:
34	35	36
August 17, 1803	August 27, 1821	September 7, 1839
37	38	39
September 18, 1857	September 29, 1875	October 9, 1893
40	41	42
October 22, 1911	November 1, 1929	November 12, 1947
43	44	45
November 23, 1965	December 4, 1983	December 14, 2001
46	47	48
December 26, 2019	January 5, 2038	January 16, 2056
49	50	51
January 27, 2074	February 7, 2092	February 18, 2110
52	53	54
March 1, 2128	March 12, 2146	March 23, 2164
55	56	
April 3, 2182	April 14, 2200	

=== Metonic series ===
The metonic series repeats eclipses every 19 years (6939.69 days), lasting about 5 cycles. Eclipses occur in nearly the same calendar date. In addition, the octon subseries repeats 1/5 of that or every 3.8 years (1387.94 days). All eclipses in this table occur at the Moon's descending node.

22 eclipse events between June 12, 2029 and November 4, 2116
June 11–12	March 30–31	January 16	November 4–5	August 23–24
118	120	122	124	126
June 12, 2029	March 30, 2033	January 16, 2037	November 4, 2040	August 23, 2044
128	130	132	134	136
June 11, 2048	March 30, 2052	January 16, 2056	November 5, 2059	August 24, 2063
138	140	142	144	146
June 11, 2067	March 31, 2071	January 16, 2075	November 4, 2078	August 24, 2082
148	150	152	154	156
June 11, 2086	March 31, 2090	January 16, 2094	November 4, 2097	August 24, 2101
158	160	162	164	
June 12, 2105			November 4, 2116	

=== Tritos series ===
This eclipse is a part of a tritos cycle, repeating at alternating nodes every 135 synodic months (≈ 3986.63 days, or 11 years minus 1 month). Their appearance and longitude are irregular due to a lack of synchronization with the anomalistic month (period of perigee), but groupings of 3 tritos cycles (≈ 33 years minus 3 months) come close (≈ 434.044 anomalistic months), so eclipses are similar in these groupings.

Series members between 1801 and 2200
January 1, 1805 (Saros 109)		October 31, 1826 (Saros 111)		August 28, 1848 (Saros 113)
July 29, 1859 (Saros 114)	June 28, 1870 (Saros 115)	May 27, 1881 (Saros 116)	April 26, 1892 (Saros 117)	March 29, 1903 (Saros 118)
February 25, 1914 (Saros 119)	January 24, 1925 (Saros 120)	December 25, 1935 (Saros 121)	November 23, 1946 (Saros 122)	October 23, 1957 (Saros 123)
September 22, 1968 (Saros 124)	August 22, 1979 (Saros 125)	July 22, 1990 (Saros 126)	June 21, 2001 (Saros 127)	May 20, 2012 (Saros 128)
April 20, 2023 (Saros 129)	March 20, 2034 (Saros 130)	February 16, 2045 (Saros 131)	January 16, 2056 (Saros 132)	December 17, 2066 (Saros 133)
November 15, 2077 (Saros 134)	October 14, 2088 (Saros 135)	September 14, 2099 (Saros 136)	August 15, 2110 (Saros 137)	July 14, 2121 (Saros 138)
June 13, 2132 (Saros 139)	May 14, 2143 (Saros 140)	April 12, 2154 (Saros 141)	March 12, 2165 (Saros 142)	February 10, 2176 (Saros 143)
January 9, 2187 (Saros 144)	December 9, 2197 (Saros 145)			

=== Inex series ===
This eclipse is a part of the long period inex cycle, repeating at alternating nodes, every 358 synodic months (≈ 10,571.95 days, or 29 years minus 20 days). Their appearance and longitude are irregular due to a lack of synchronization with the anomalistic month (period of perigee). However, groupings of 3 inex cycles (≈ 87 years minus 2 months) comes close (≈ 1,151.02 anomalistic months), so eclipses are similar in these groupings.

Series members between 1801 and 2200
June 26, 1824 (Saros 124)	June 6, 1853 (Saros 125)	May 17, 1882 (Saros 126)
April 28, 1911 (Saros 127)	April 7, 1940 (Saros 128)	March 18, 1969 (Saros 129)
February 26, 1998 (Saros 130)	February 6, 2027 (Saros 131)	January 16, 2056 (Saros 132)
December 27, 2084 (Saros 133)	December 8, 2113 (Saros 134)	November 17, 2142 (Saros 135)
October 29, 2171 (Saros 136)	October 9, 2200 (Saros 137)	
