= Solar eclipse of August 3, 2054 =

Future partial solar eclipse

- Partial eclipse
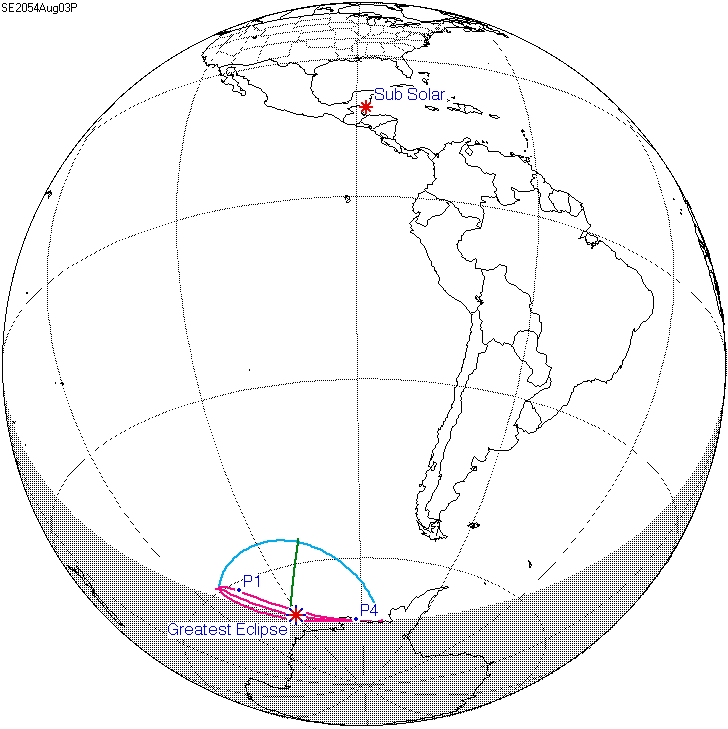
- Map
- Gamma: −1.4941
- Magnitude: 0.0655

Maximum eclipse
- Coordinates: 69.8°S 121.3°W

Times (UTC)
- Greatest eclipse: 18:04:02

References
- Saros: 117 (71 of 71)
- Catalog # (SE5000): 9629

A partial solar eclipse will occur at the Moon's ascending node of orbit on Monday, August 3, 2054, with a magnitude of 0.0655. A solar eclipse occurs when the Moon passes between Earth and the Sun, thereby totally or partly obscuring the image of the Sun for a viewer on Earth. A partial solar eclipse occurs in the polar regions of the Earth when the center of the Moon's shadow misses the Earth.

The partial solar eclipse will be visible for a very small part of Antarctica. This event will be the 71st and final event in Solar Saros 117.

== Eclipse details ==
Shown below are two tables displaying details about this particular solar eclipse. The first table outlines times at which the Moon's penumbra or umbra attains the specific parameter, and the second table describes various other parameters pertaining to this eclipse.

August 3, 2054 Solar Eclipse Times
Event	Time (UTC)
First Penumbral External Contact	2054 August 03 at 17:30:57.7 UTC
Ecliptic Conjunction	2054 August 03 at 17:49:29.6 UTC
Greatest Eclipse	2054 August 03 at 18:04:02.1 UTC
Equatorial Conjunction	2054 August 03 at 18:32:59.0 UTC
Last Penumbral External Contact	2054 August 03 at 18:36:52.3 UTC

August 3, 2054 Solar Eclipse Parameters
Parameter	Value
Eclipse Magnitude	0.06558
Eclipse Obscuration	0.02025
Gamma	−1.49414
Sun Right Ascension	08h56m24.5s
Sun Declination	+17°17'09.2"
Sun Semi-Diameter	15'45.7"
Sun Equatorial Horizontal Parallax	08.7"
Moon Right Ascension	08h55m14.2s
Moon Declination	+15°47'22.5"
Moon Semi-Diameter	16'41.7"
Moon Equatorial Horizontal Parallax	1°01'16.5"
ΔT	86.9 s

== Eclipse season ==
This eclipse is part of an eclipse season, a period, roughly every six months, when eclipses occur. Only two (or occasionally three) eclipse seasons occur each year, and each season lasts about 35 days and repeats just short of six months (173 days) later; thus two full eclipse seasons always occur each year. Either two or three eclipses happen each eclipse season. In the sequence below, each eclipse is separated by a fortnight. The first and last eclipse in this sequence is separated by one synodic month.

Eclipse season of August–September 2054
August 3 Ascending node (new moon)	August 18 Descending node (full moon)	September 2 Ascending node (new moon)
Partial solar eclipse Solar Saros 117	Total lunar eclipse Lunar Saros 129	Partial solar eclipse Solar Saros 155

== Related eclipses ==
=== Eclipses in 2054 ===
- A total lunar eclipse on February 22.
- A partial solar eclipse on March 9.
- A partial solar eclipse on August 3.
- A total lunar eclipse on August 18.
- A partial solar eclipse on September 2.

=== Metonic ===
- Followed by: Solar eclipse of May 22, 2058

=== Tzolkinex ===
- Preceded by: Solar eclipse of June 23, 2047

=== Tritos ===
- Followed by: Solar eclipse of July 3, 2065

=== Solar Saros 117 ===
- Preceded by: Solar eclipse of July 23, 2036

=== Inex ===
- Followed by: Solar eclipse of July 15, 2083

=== Triad ===
- Followed by: Solar eclipse of June 4, 2141

=== Solar eclipses of 2054–2058 ===
This eclipse is a member of a semester series. An eclipse in a semester series of solar eclipses repeats approximately every 177 days and 4 hours (a semester) at alternating nodes of the Moon's orbit.

The partial solar eclipses on March 9, 2054 and September 2, 2054 occur in the previous lunar year eclipse set, and the partial solar eclipses on May 22, 2058 and November 16, 2058 occur in the next lunar year eclipse set.

Solar eclipse series sets from 2054 to 2058
Ascending node			Descending node		
Saros	Map	Gamma	Saros	Map	Gamma
117	August 3, 2054 Partial	−1.4941	122	January 27, 2055 Partial	1.155
127	July 24, 2055 Total	−0.8012	132	January 16, 2056 Annular	0.4199
137	July 12, 2056 Annular	−0.0426	142	January 5, 2057 Total	−0.2837
147	July 1, 2057 Annular	0.7455	152	December 26, 2057 Total	−0.9405
157	June 21, 2058 Partial	1.4869			

=== Saros 117 ===
This eclipse is a part of Saros series 117, repeating every 18 years, 11 days, and containing 71 events. The series started with a partial solar eclipse on June 24, 792 AD. It contains annular eclipses from September 18, 936 AD through May 14, 1333; hybrid eclipses from May 25, 1351 through July 8, 1423; and total eclipses from July 18, 1441 through May 19, 1928. The series ends at member 71 as a partial eclipse on August 3, 2054. Its eclipses are tabulated in three columns; every third eclipse in the same column is one exeligmos apart, so they all cast shadows over approximately the same parts of the Earth.

The longest duration of annularity was produced by member 16 at 9 minutes, 26 seconds on December 3, 1062, and the longest duration of totality was produced by member 62 at 4 minutes, 19 seconds on April 26, 1892. All eclipses in this series occur at the Moon’s ascending node of orbit.

Series members 57–71 occur between 1801 and 2054:
57	58	59
March 4, 1802	March 14, 1820	March 25, 1838
60	61	62
April 5, 1856	April 16, 1874	April 26, 1892
63	64	65
May 9, 1910	May 19, 1928	May 30, 1946
66	67	68
June 10, 1964	June 21, 1982	July 1, 2000
69	70	71
July 13, 2018	July 23, 2036	August 3, 2054

=== Metonic series ===
The metonic series repeats eclipses every 19 years (6939.69 days), lasting about 5 cycles. Eclipses occur in nearly the same calendar date. In addition, the octon subseries repeats 1/5 of that or every 3.8 years (1387.94 days). All eclipses in this table occur at the Moon's ascending node.

23 eclipse events between August 3, 2054 and October 16, 2145
August 3–4	May 22–24	March 10–11	December 27–29	October 14–16
117	119	121	123	125
August 3, 2054	May 22, 2058	March 11, 2062	December 27, 2065	October 15, 2069
127	129	131	133	135
August 3, 2073	May 22, 2077	March 10, 2081	December 27, 2084	October 14, 2088
137	139	141	143	145
August 3, 2092	May 22, 2096	March 10, 2100	December 29, 2103	October 16, 2107
147	149	151	153	155
August 4, 2111	May 24, 2115	March 11, 2119	December 28, 2122	October 16, 2126
157	159	161	163	165
August 4, 2130	May 23, 2134			October 16, 2145

=== Tritos series ===
This eclipse is a part of a tritos cycle, repeating at alternating nodes every 135 synodic months (≈ 3986.63 days, or 11 years minus 1 month). Their appearance and longitude are irregular due to a lack of synchronization with the anomalistic month (period of perigee), but groupings of 3 tritos cycles (≈ 33 years minus 3 months) come close (≈ 434.044 anomalistic months), so eclipses are similar in these groupings.

Series members between 2054 and 2200
August 3, 2054 (Saros 117)	July 3, 2065 (Saros 118)	June 1, 2076 (Saros 119)	May 2, 2087 (Saros 120)	April 1, 2098 (Saros 121)
March 1, 2109 (Saros 122)	January 30, 2120 (Saros 123)	December 30, 2130 (Saros 124)	November 28, 2141 (Saros 125)	October 28, 2152 (Saros 126)
September 28, 2163 (Saros 127)	August 27, 2174 (Saros 128)	July 26, 2185 (Saros 129)	June 26, 2196 (Saros 130)	

=== Inex series ===
This eclipse is a part of the long period inex cycle, repeating at alternating nodes, every 358 synodic months (≈ 10,571.95 days, or 29 years minus 20 days). Their appearance and longitude are irregular due to a lack of synchronization with the anomalistic month (period of perigee). However, groupings of 3 inex cycles (≈ 87 years minus 2 months) comes close (≈ 1,151.02 anomalistic months), so eclipses are similar in these groupings.

The partial solar eclipses on January 12, 1823 (part of Saros 109) and December 2, 1880 (part of Saros 111) are also a part of this series but are not included in the table below.

Series members between 2054 and 2200
August 3, 2054 (Saros 117)	July 15, 2083 (Saros 118)	June 24, 2112 (Saros 119)
June 4, 2141 (Saros 120)	May 16, 2170 (Saros 121)	April 25, 2199 (Saros 122)
