= Solar Saros 118 =

Saros cycle series 118 for solar eclipses

Saros cycle series 118 for solar eclipses occurs at the Moon's descending node, repeating every 18 years, 11 days, containing 72 eclipses, including 57 umbral eclipses (40 total, 2 hybrid, 15 annular). The first eclipse was on 24 May 803 and the last will be on 15 July 2083. The most recent eclipse was a partial eclipse on 1 June 2011 and the next will be a partial eclipse on 12 June 2029.

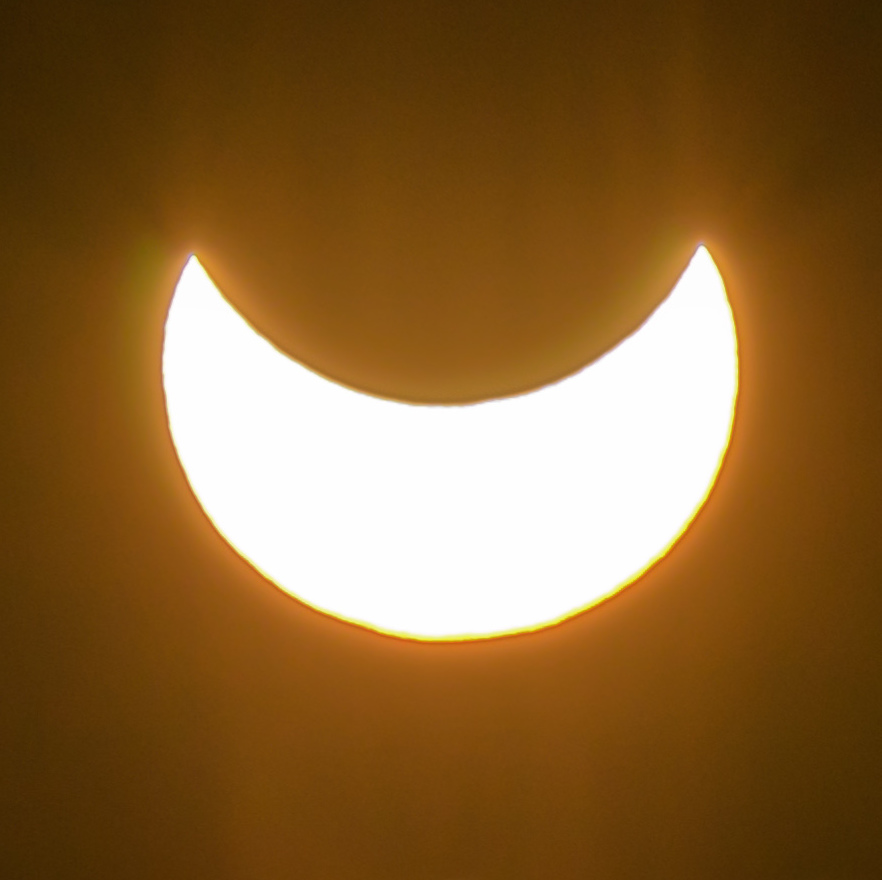
June 1, 2011 Series member 68

Saros 118

The longest totality was 6 minutes 59 seconds on 16 May 1398, the longest annular was 1 minute 58 seconds on 23 February 1849. This solar saros is linked to Lunar Saros 111.

Series members 62–72 occurring between 1901 and 2083:
62	63	64
Mar 29, 1903	Apr 8, 1921	Apr 19, 1939
65	66	67
Apr 30, 1957	May 11, 1975	May 21, 1993
68	69	70
Jun 1, 2011	Jun 12, 2029	Jun 23, 2047
71	72	
Jul 3, 2065	Jul 15, 2083	

== Umbral eclipses ==
Umbral eclipses (annular, total and hybrid) can be further classified as either: 1) Central (two limits), 2) Central (one limit) or 3) Non-Central (one limit). The statistical distribution of these classes in Saros series 118 appears in the following table.

Classification	Number	Percent
All Umbral eclipses	57	100.00%
Central (two limits)	56	98.25%
Central (one limit)	0	0.00%
Non-central (one limit)	1	1.75%

== All eclipses ==
Note: Dates are given in the Julian calendar prior to 15 October 1582, and in the Gregorian calendar after that.

Saros	Member	Date	Time (Greatest) UTC	Type	Location Lat, Long	Gamma	Mag.	Width (km)	Duration (min:sec)	Ref
118	1	May 24, 803	13:35:52	Partial	68.1S 0.7W	-1.5325	0.0122			
118	2	June 3, 821	20:45:44	Partial	67.1S 119.9W	-1.4545	0.1561			
118	3	June 15, 839	3:56:24	Partial	66.1S 121.2E	-1.3758	0.3023			
118	4	June 25, 857	11:08:23	Partial	65.1S 2.5E	-1.2972	0.4494			
118	5	July 6, 875	18:24:50	Partial	64.2S 117W	-1.221	0.5929			
118	6	July 17, 893	1:45:18	Partial	63.4S 122.8E	-1.1469	0.7327			
118	7	July 28, 911	9:12:23	Partial	62.6S 1.2E	-1.0774	0.864			
118	8	August 7, 929	16:45:08	Partial	62S 121.6W	-1.0118	0.988			
118	9	August 19, 947	0:26:53	Total	51.3S 139.1E	-0.9527	1.0357	393	2m 29s	
118	10	August 29, 965	8:15:51	Total	47.1S 24.8E	-0.899	1.0377	283	2m 41s	
118	11	September 9, 983	16:13:17	Total	45.7S 93.8W	-0.8518	1.0386	242	2m 44s	
118	12	September 20, 1001	0:19:08	Total	46.1S 144.9E	-0.8111	1.0388	218	2m 43s	
118	13	October 1, 1019	8:34:20	Total	47.8S 20.9E	-0.7781	1.0386	202	2m 40s	
118	14	October 11, 1037	16:57:23	Total	50.3S 104.8W	-0.7512	1.0382	191	2m 36s	
118	15	October 23, 1055	1:27:47	Total	53.4S 128.1E	-0.7301	1.0377	183	2m 32s	
118	16	November 2, 1073	10:05:13	Total	56.8S 0.1E	-0.7148	1.0373	178	2m 29s	
118	17	November 13, 1091	18:48:57	Total	60.3S 128.2W	-0.7047	1.0371	175	2m 26s	
118	18	November 24, 1109	3:36:12	Total	63.5S 104.6E	-0.6974	1.0372	175	2m 26s	
118	19	December 5, 1127	12:27:08	Total	65.9S 21.2W	-0.693	1.0377	176	2m 28s	
118	20	December 15, 1145	21:18:46	Total	67S 145W	-0.6892	1.0387	180	2m 32s	
118	21	December 27, 1163	6:11:27	Total	66.6S 91.5E	-0.686	1.04	185	2m 38s	
118	22	January 6, 1182	15:00:32	Total	64.4S 32.7W	-0.6802	1.0419	192	2m 48s	
118	23	January 17, 1200	23:48:29	Total	61S 159.1W	-0.6731	1.0443	200	3m 1s	
118	24	January 28, 1218	8:30:17	Total	56.5S 73.1E	-0.6613	1.047	209	3m 17s	
118	25	February 8, 1236	17:07:28	Total	51.3S 55.5W	-0.6454	1.0501	217	3m 36s	
118	26	February 19, 1254	1:36:18	Total	45.4S 176.3E	-0.6227	1.0534	225	3m 59s	
118	27	March 1, 1272	9:59:32	Total	39.2S 48.6E	-0.5954	1.0569	232	4m 24s	
118	28	March 12, 1290	18:13:59	Total	32.7S 77.6W	-0.5611	1.0604	238	4m 52s	
118	29	March 23, 1308	2:21:00	Total	25.9S 157.8E	-0.5205	1.0638	243	5m 21s	
118	30	April 3, 1326	10:19:38	Total	19S 35.3E	-0.4731	1.0668	246	5m 49s	
118	31	April 13, 1344	18:11:36	Total	12S 85.4W	-0.42	1.0695	249	6m 15s	
118	32	April 25, 1362	1:56:16	Total	5.2S 155.9E	-0.3611	1.0717	249	6m 37s	
118	33	May 5, 1380	9:34:58	Total	1.5N 39.2E	-0.2973	1.0732	249	6m 52s	
118	34	May 16, 1398	17:08:41	Total	7.7N 75.7W	-0.2294	1.0741	247	6m 59s	
118	35	May 27, 1416	0:38:48	Total	13.5N 171E	-0.1584	1.0742	244	6m 56s	
118	36	June 7, 1434	8:05:20	Total	18.7N 59.3E	-0.0847	1.0735	239	6m 45s	
118	37	June 17, 1452	15:30:42	Total	23N 51.3W	-0.0102	1.0719	234	6m 26s	
118	38	June 28, 1470	22:54:56	Total	26.4N 161W	0.065	1.0695	227	6m 2s	
118	39	July 9, 1488	6:20:51	Total	28.9N 89.5E	0.1384	1.0663	219	5m 36s	
118	40	July 20, 1506	13:46:58	Total	30.4N 19.8W	0.2112	1.0623	209	5m 8s	
118	41	July 30, 1524	21:17:39	Total	30.8N 130.2W	0.2797	1.0577	198	4m 40s	
118	42	August 11, 1542	4:51:06	Total	30.6N 118.6E	0.3454	1.0525	184	4m 12s	
118	43	August 21, 1560	12:30:55	Total	29.7N 5.3E	0.405	1.0469	170	3m 45s	
118	44	September 1, 1578	20:15:08	Total	28.4N 109.6W	0.4602	1.0408	152	3m 17s	
118	45	September 22, 1596	4:07:03	Total	26.8N 133E	0.5085	1.0346	134	2m 50s	
118	46	October 3, 1614	12:04:51	Total	25.2N 13.5E	0.5511	1.0282	113	2m 22s	
118	47	October 13, 1632	20:09:39	Total	23.7N 108.2W	0.5873	1.022	91	1m 55s	
118	48	October 25, 1650	4:21:25	Total	22.3N 127.9E	0.617	1.0159	68	1m 26s	
118	49	November 4, 1668	12:40:05	Hybrid	21.1N 1.8E	0.6401	1.0102	45	0m 57s	
118	50	November 15, 1686	21:05:00	Hybrid	20.2N 126W	0.6578	1.0048	22	0m 28s	
118	51	November 27, 1704	5:33:52	Annular	19.7N 104.9E	0.6716	0.9999	1	0m 1s	
118	52	December 8, 1722	14:07:35	Annular	19.5N 25.4W	0.6808	0.9955	21	0m 28s	
118	53	December 18, 1740	22:43:17	Annular	19.9N 156.4W	0.6876	0.9917	40	0m 53s	
118	54	December 30, 1758	7:20:12	Annular	20.8N 72.2E	0.6929	0.9885	56	1m 15s	
118	55	January 9, 1777	15:55:35	Annular	22.4N 58.9W	0.6988	0.9859	70	1m 32s	
118	56	January 21, 1795	0:29:13	Annular	24.8N 170.3E	0.7055	0.9837	81	1m 44s	
118	57	February 1, 1813	8:58:27	Annular	27.9N 40.4E	0.7152	0.982	91	1m 53s	
118	58	February 12, 1831	17:21:45	Annular	31.9N 88.3W	0.7288	0.9807	100	1m 57s	
118	59	February 23, 1849	1:38:09	Annular	36.7N 144.3E	0.7475	0.9796	108	1m 58s	
118	60	March 6, 1867	9:46:48	Annular	42.3N 18.4E	0.7716	0.9787	118	1m 57s	
118	61	March 16, 1885	17:45:43	Annular	48.9N 106.1W	0.803	0.9778	132	1m 55s	
118	62	March 29, 1903	1:35:23	Annular	56.2N 130.3E	0.8413	0.9767	153	1m 53s	
118	63	April 8, 1921	9:15:01	Annular	64.5N 5.6E	0.8869	0.9753	192	1m 50s	
118	64	April 19, 1939	16:45:53	Annular	73.1N 129.1W	0.9388	0.9731	285	1m 49s	
118	65	April 30, 1957	0:05:28	Annular	70.6N 40.3E	0.9992	0.9799	-	-	
118	66	May 11, 1975	7:17:33	Partial	69.7N 80.2W	1.0647	0.8636			
118	67	May 21, 1993	14:20:15	Partial	68.8N 162.3E	1.1372	0.7352			
118	68	June 1, 2011	21:17:18	Partial	67.8N 46.8E	1.213	0.601			
118	69	June 12, 2029	4:06:13	Partial	66.8N 66.2W	1.2943	0.4576			
118	70	June 23, 2047	10:52:31	Partial	65.8N 178W	1.3766	0.3129			
118	71	July 3, 2065	17:33:52	Partial	64.8N 71.9E	1.4619	0.1638			
118	72	July 15, 2083	0:14:23	Partial	64N 37.7W	1.5465	0.0168			
