= Solar eclipse of July 23, 2036 =

Future partial solar eclipse

- Partial eclipse
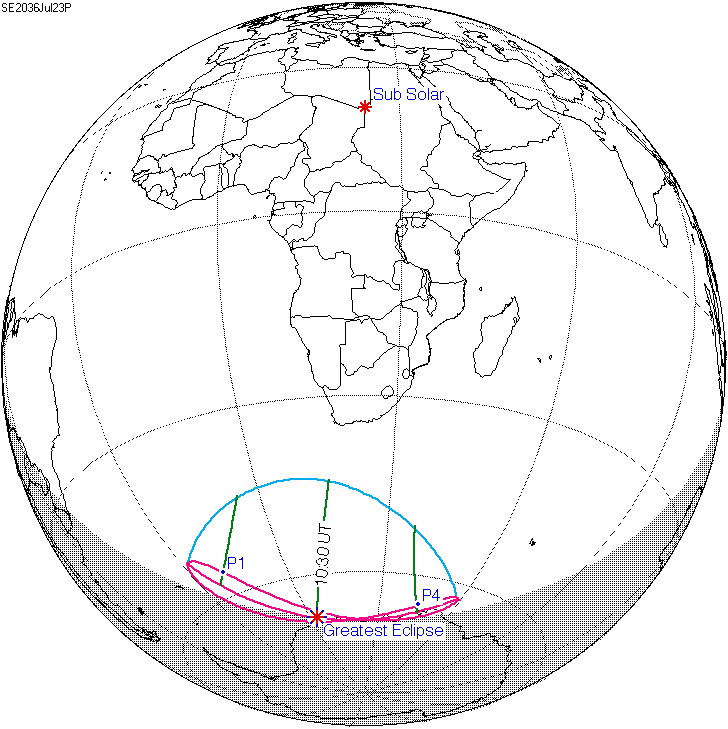
- Map
- Gamma: −1.425
- Magnitude: 0.1991

Maximum eclipse
- Coordinates: 68.9°S 3.6°E

Times (UTC)
- Greatest eclipse: 10:32:06

References
- Saros: 117 (70 of 71)
- Catalog # (SE5000): 9588

A partial solar eclipse will occur at the Moon's ascending node of orbit on Wednesday, July 23, 2036, with a magnitude of 0.1991. A solar eclipse occurs when the Moon passes between Earth and the Sun, thereby totally or partly obscuring the image of the Sun for a viewer on Earth. A partial solar eclipse occurs in the polar regions of the Earth when the center of the Moon's shadow misses the Earth.

A partial eclipse will be visible for only a sliver of East Antarctica.

== Images ==
Animated path

== Eclipse timing ==
=== Places experiencing partial eclipse ===
Solar Eclipse of July 23, 2036 (Local Times)
| Country or territory | City or place | Start of partial eclipse | Maximum eclipse | End of partial eclipse | Duration of eclipse (hr:min) | Maximum coverage |
|---|---|---|---|---|---|---|
| Bouvet Island | Bouvet Island | 11:45:20 | 12:20:03 | 12:55:23 | 1:10 | 5.96% |

== Eclipse details ==
Shown below are two tables displaying details about this particular solar eclipse. The first table outlines times at which the Moon's penumbra or umbra attains the specific parameter, and the second table describes various other parameters pertaining to this eclipse.

July 23, 2036 Solar Eclipse Times
| Event | Time (UTC) |
|---|---|
| First Penumbral External Contact | 2036 July 23 at 09:35:21.5 UTC |
| Ecliptic Conjunction | 2036 July 23 at 10:18:12.3 UTC |
| Greatest Eclipse | 2036 July 23 at 10:32:06.5 UTC |
| Equatorial Conjunction | 2036 July 23 at 10:50:40.1 UTC |
| Last Penumbral External Contact | 2036 July 23 at 11:28:42.3 UTC |

July 23, 2036 Solar Eclipse Parameters
| Parameter | Value |
|---|---|
| Eclipse Magnitude | 0.19916 |
| Eclipse Obscuration | 0.10504 |
| Gamma | −1.42501 |
| Sun Right Ascension | 08h13m32.5s |
| Sun Declination | +19°53'41.2" |
| Sun Semi-Diameter | 15'44.6" |
| Sun Equatorial Horizontal Parallax | 08.7" |
| Moon Right Ascension | 08h12m46.3s |
| Moon Declination | +18°27'12.2" |
| Moon Semi-Diameter | 16'42.4" |
| Moon Equatorial Horizontal Parallax | 1°01'18.7" |
| ΔT | 76.8 s |

== Eclipse season ==
This eclipse is part of an eclipse season, a period, roughly every six months, when eclipses occur. Only two (or occasionally three) eclipse seasons occur each year, and each season lasts about 35 days and repeats just short of six months (173 days) later; thus two full eclipse seasons always occur each year. Either two or three eclipses happen each eclipse season. In the sequence below, each eclipse is separated by a fortnight. The first and last eclipse in this sequence is separated by one synodic month.

Eclipse season of July–August 2036
| July 23 Ascending node (new moon) | August 7 Descending node (full moon) | August 21 Ascending node (new moon) |
|---|---|---|
| Partial solar eclipse Solar Saros 117 | Total lunar eclipse Lunar Saros 129 | Partial solar eclipse Solar Saros 155 |

== Related eclipses ==
=== Eclipses in 2036 ===
- A total lunar eclipse on February 11.
- A partial solar eclipse on February 27.
- A partial solar eclipse on July 23.
- A total lunar eclipse on August 7.
- A partial solar eclipse on August 21.

=== Metonic ===
- Followed by: Solar eclipse of May 11, 2040

=== Tzolkinex ===
- Preceded by: Solar eclipse of June 12, 2029

=== Half-Saros ===
- Preceded by: Lunar eclipse of July 18, 2027

=== Tritos ===
- Followed by: Solar eclipse of June 23, 2047

=== Solar Saros 117 ===
- Preceded by: Solar eclipse of July 13, 2018
- Followed by: Solar eclipse of August 3, 2054

=== Inex ===
- Followed by: Solar eclipse of July 3, 2065

=== Triad ===
- Followed by: Solar eclipse of May 25, 2123

=== Solar eclipses of 2036–2039 ===
This eclipse is a member of a semester series. An eclipse in a semester series of solar eclipses repeats approximately every 177 days and 4 hours (a semester) at alternating nodes of the Moon's orbit.

The partial solar eclipses on February 27, 2036 and August 21, 2036 occur in the previous lunar year eclipse set.

Solar eclipse series sets from 2036 to 2039
| Ascending node | | | Descending node | | |
| Saros | Map | Gamma | Saros | Map | Gamma |
| 117 | July 23, 2036 Partial | −1.425 | 122 | January 16, 2037 Partial | 1.1477 |
| 127 | July 13, 2037 Total | −0.7246 | 132 | January 5, 2038 Annular | 0.4169 |
| 137 | July 2, 2038 Annular | 0.0398 | 142 | December 26, 2038 Total | −0.2881 |
| 147 | June 21, 2039 Annular | 0.8312 | 152 | December 15, 2039 Total | −0.9458 |

=== Saros 117 ===
This eclipse is a part of Saros series 117, repeating every 18 years, 11 days, and containing 71 events. The series started with a partial solar eclipse on June 24, 792 AD. It contains annular eclipses from September 18, 936 AD through May 14, 1333; hybrid eclipses from May 25, 1351 through July 8, 1423; and total eclipses from July 18, 1441 through May 19, 1928. The series ends at member 71 as a partial eclipse on August 3, 2054. Its eclipses are tabulated in three columns; every third eclipse in the same column is one exeligmos apart, so they all cast shadows over approximately the same parts of the Earth.

The longest duration of annularity was produced by member 16 at 9 minutes, 26 seconds on December 3, 1062, and the longest duration of totality was produced by member 62 at 4 minutes, 19 seconds on April 26, 1892. All eclipses in this series occur at the Moon’s ascending node of orbit.

Series members 57–71 occur between 1801 and 2054:
| 57 | 58 | 59 |
|---|---|---|
| March 4, 1802 | March 14, 1820 | March 25, 1838 |
| 60 | 61 | 62 |
| April 5, 1856 | April 16, 1874 | April 26, 1892 |
| 63 | 64 | 65 |
| May 9, 1910 | May 19, 1928 | May 30, 1946 |
| 66 | 67 | 68 |
| June 10, 1964 | June 21, 1982 | July 1, 2000 |
| 69 | 70 | 71 |
| July 13, 2018 | July 23, 2036 | August 3, 2054 |

=== Metonic series ===
The metonic series repeats eclipses every 19 years (6939.69 days), lasting about 5 cycles. Eclipses occur in nearly the same calendar date. In addition, the octon subseries repeats 1/5 of that or every 3.8 years (1387.94 days). All eclipses in this table occur at the Moon's ascending node.

21 eclipse events between July 23, 2036 and July 23, 2112
| July 23–24 | May 11 | February 27–28 | December 16–17 | October 4–5 |
| 117 | 119 | 121 | 123 | 125 |
|---|---|---|---|---|
| July 23, 2036 | May 11, 2040 | February 28, 2044 | December 16, 2047 | October 4, 2051 |
| 127 | 129 | 131 | 133 | 135 |
| July 24, 2055 | May 11, 2059 | February 28, 2063 | December 17, 2066 | October 4, 2070 |
| 137 | 139 | 141 | 143 | 145 |
| July 24, 2074 | May 11, 2078 | February 27, 2082 | December 16, 2085 | October 4, 2089 |
| 147 | 149 | 151 | 153 | 155 |
| July 23, 2093 | May 11, 2097 | February 28, 2101 | December 17, 2104 | October 5, 2108 |
157
July 23, 2112

=== Tritos series ===
This eclipse is a part of a tritos cycle, repeating at alternating nodes every 135 synodic months (≈ 3986.63 days, or 11 years minus 1 month). Their appearance and longitude are irregular due to a lack of synchronization with the anomalistic month (period of perigee), but groupings of 3 tritos cycles (≈ 33 years minus 3 months) come close (≈ 434.044 anomalistic months), so eclipses are similar in these groupings.

Series members between 2036 and 2200
| July 23, 2036 (Saros 117) | June 23, 2047 (Saros 118) | May 22, 2058 (Saros 119) | April 21, 2069 (Saros 120) | March 21, 2080 (Saros 121) |
| February 18, 2091 (Saros 122) | January 19, 2102 (Saros 123) | December 19, 2112 (Saros 124) | November 18, 2123 (Saros 125) | October 17, 2134 (Saros 126) |
| September 16, 2145 (Saros 127) | August 16, 2156 (Saros 128) | July 16, 2167 (Saros 129) | June 16, 2178 (Saros 130) | May 15, 2189 (Saros 131) |
April 14, 2200 (Saros 132)

=== Inex series ===
This eclipse is a part of the long period inex cycle, repeating at alternating nodes, every 358 synodic months (≈ 10,571.95 days, or 29 years minus 20 days). Their appearance and longitude are irregular due to a lack of synchronization with the anomalistic month (period of perigee). However, groupings of 3 inex cycles (≈ 87 years minus 2 months) comes close (≈ 1,151.02 anomalistic months), so eclipses are similar in these groupings.

The partial solar eclipses on January 1, 1805 (part of Saros 109) and November 21, 1862 (part of Saros 111) are also a part of this series but are not included in the table below.

Series members between 2036 and 2200
| July 23, 2036 (Saros 117) | July 3, 2065 (Saros 118) | June 13, 2094 (Saros 119) |
| May 25, 2123 (Saros 120) | May 4, 2152 (Saros 121) | April 14, 2181 (Saros 122) |
