= Solar eclipse of April 8, 1921 =

20th-century annular solar eclipse

- Annular eclipse
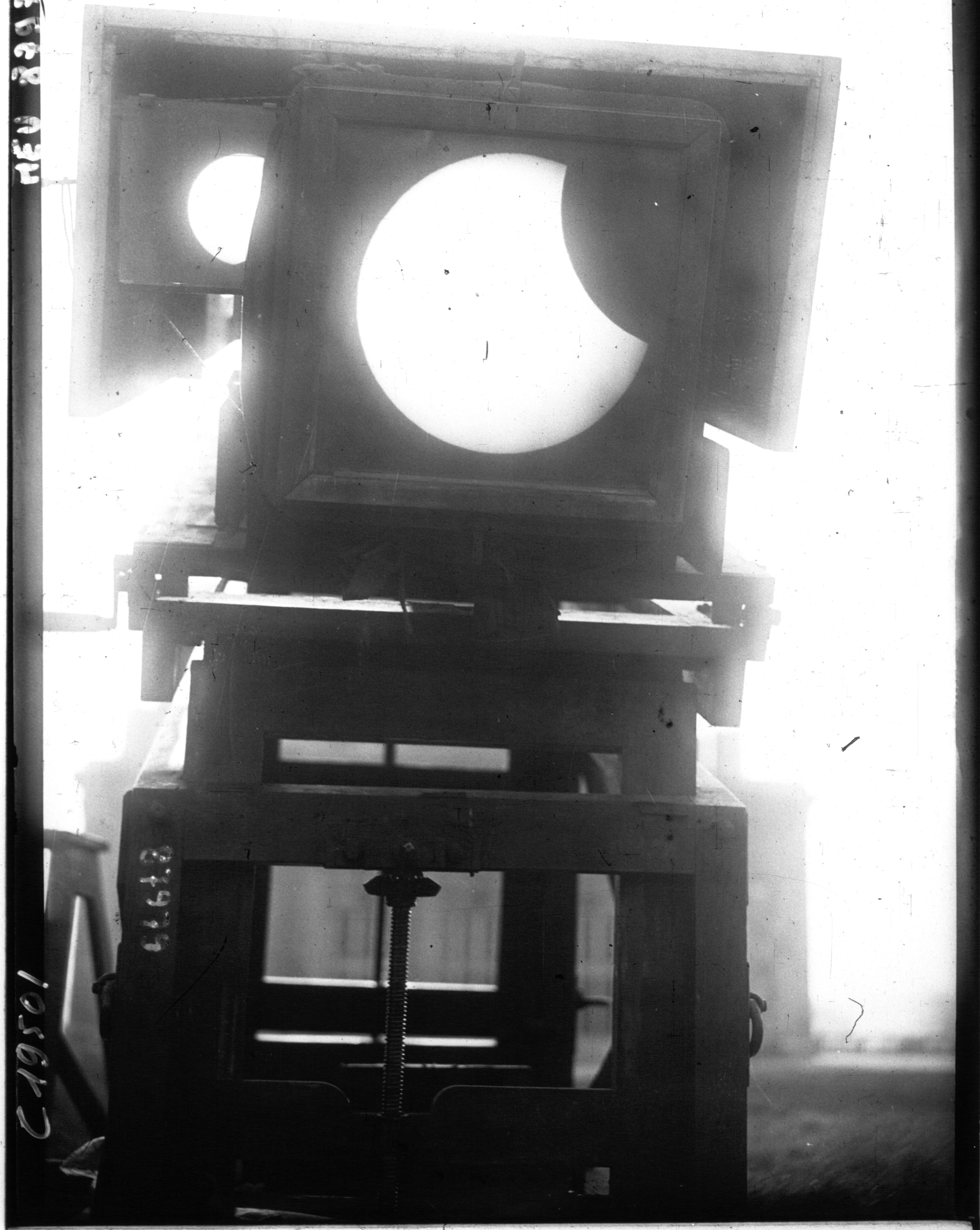

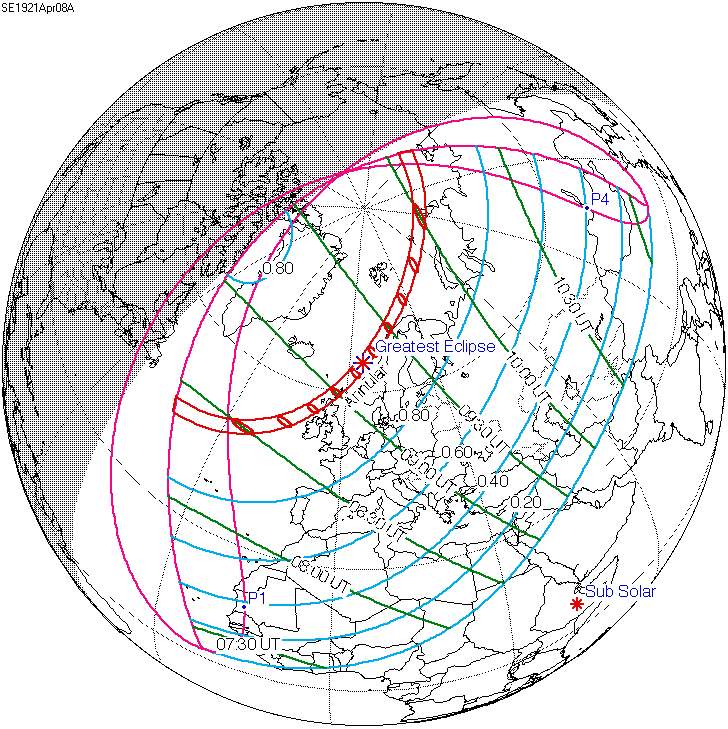
- Map
- Gamma: 0.8869
- Magnitude: 0.9753

Maximum eclipse
- Duration: 110 s (1 min 50 s)
- Coordinates: 64.5°N 5.6°E
- Max. width of band: 192 km (119 mi)

Times (UTC)
- Greatest eclipse: 9:15:01

References
- Saros: 118 (63 of 72)
- Catalog # (SE5000): 9330

An annular solar eclipse occurred at the Moon's descending node of orbit on Friday, April 8, 1921, with a magnitude of 0.9753. A solar eclipse occurs when the Moon passes between Earth and the Sun, thereby totally or partly obscuring the image of the Sun for a viewer on Earth. An annular solar eclipse occurs when the Moon's apparent diameter is smaller than the Sun's, blocking most of the Sun's light and causing the Sun to look like an annulus (ring). An annular eclipse appears as a partial eclipse over a region of the Earth thousands of kilometres wide. The Moon's apparent diameter was near the average diameter because it occurred 6.5 days after apogee (on April 1, 1921, at 20:50 UTC) and 8.3 days before perigee (on April 16, 1921, at 16:10 UTC).

Annularity was visible from northern Scotland, northwestern tip of Norway, and islands in the Arctic Ocean in Russian SFSR. A partial eclipse was visible for parts of North Africa, Europe, Central Asia, and the Russian SFSR.

== Eclipse details ==
Shown below are two tables displaying details about this particular solar eclipse. The first table outlines times at which the Moon's penumbra or umbra attains the specific parameter, and the second table describes various other parameters pertaining to this eclipse.

April 8, 1921 Solar Eclipse Times
Event	Time (UTC)
First Penumbral External Contact	1921 April 8 at 06:51:44.6 UTC
First Umbral External Contact	1921 April 8 at 08:21:25.5 UTC
First Central Line	1921 April 8 at 08:23:38.1 UTC
Greatest Duration	1921 April 8 at 08:23:38.1 UTC
First Umbral Internal Contact	1921 April 8 at 08:25:55.2 UTC
Ecliptic Conjunction	1921 April 8 at 09:05:08.6 UTC
Greatest Eclipse	1921 April 8 at 09:15:01.3 UTC
Equatorial Conjunction	1921 April 8 at 09:44:56.4 UTC
Last Umbral Internal Contact	1921 April 8 at 10:03:48.2 UTC
Last Central Line	1921 April 8 at 10:06:02.5 UTC
Last Umbral External Contact	1921 April 8 at 10:08:12.1 UTC
Last Penumbral External Contact	1921 April 8 at 11:37:57.8 UTC

April 8, 1921 Solar Eclipse Parameters
Parameter	Value
Eclipse Magnitude	0.97530
Eclipse Obscuration	0.95120
Gamma	0.88692
Sun Right Ascension	01h06m22.7s
Sun Declination	+07°03'40.4"
Sun Semi-Diameter	15'58.0"
Sun Equatorial Horizontal Parallax	08.8"
Moon Right Ascension	01h05m24.3s
Moon Declination	+07°51'45.1"
Moon Semi-Diameter	15'28.0"
Moon Equatorial Horizontal Parallax	0°56'45.6"
ΔT	22.3 s

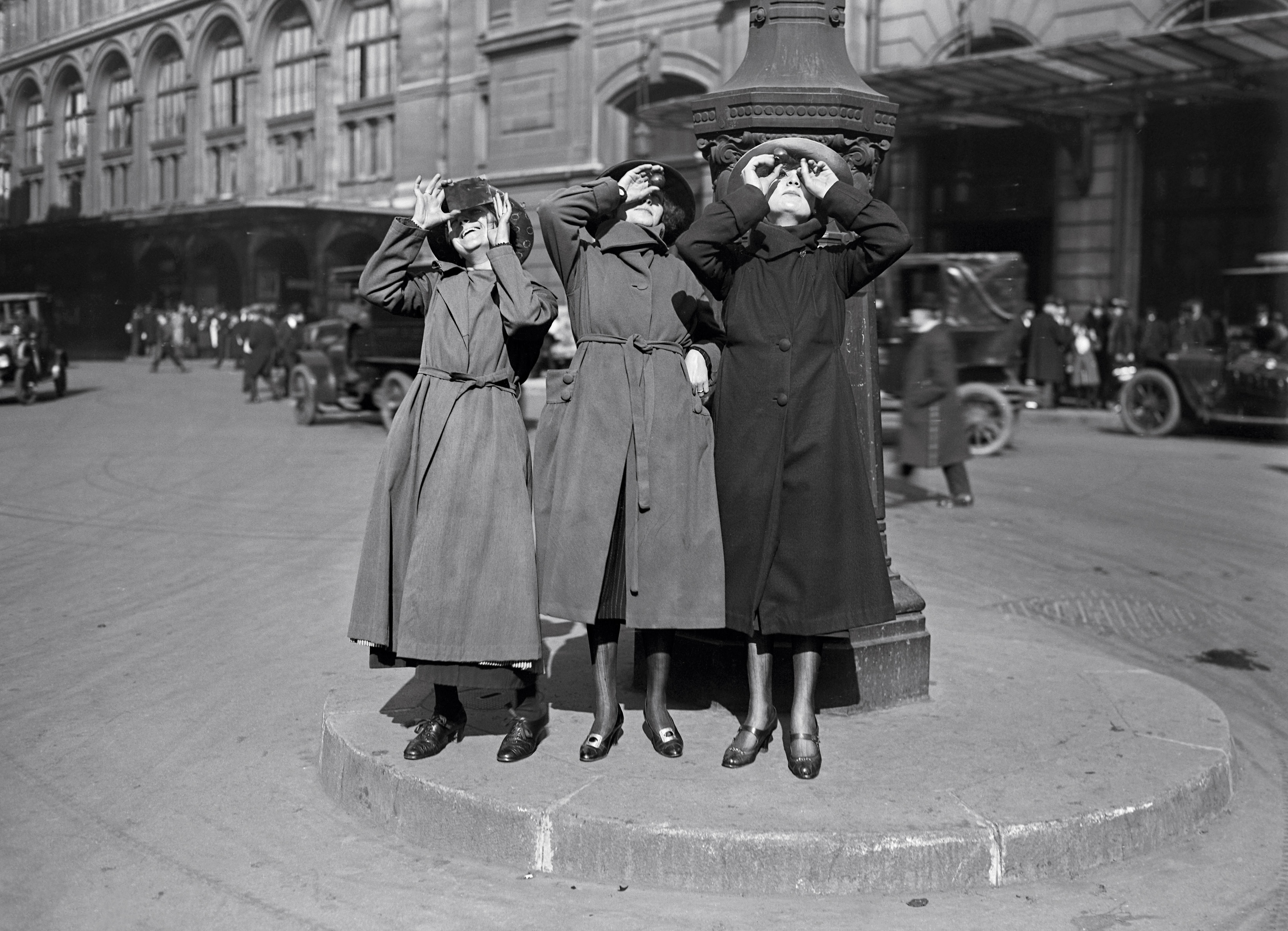
Three Parisian women watching the solar eclipse of 8 April 1921

== Eclipse season ==
This eclipse is part of an eclipse season, a period, roughly every six months, when eclipses occur. Only two (or occasionally three) eclipse seasons occur each year, and each season lasts about 35 days and repeats just short of six months (173 days) later; thus two full eclipse seasons always occur each year. Either two or three eclipses happen each eclipse season. In the sequence below, each eclipse is separated by a fortnight.

Eclipse season of April 1921
April 8 Descending node (new moon)	April 22 Ascending node (full moon)
Annular solar eclipse Solar Saros 118	Total lunar eclipse Lunar Saros 130

== Related eclipses ==
=== Eclipses in 1921 ===
- An annular solar eclipse on April 8.
- A total lunar eclipse on April 22.
- A total solar eclipse on October 1.
- A partial lunar eclipse on October 16.

=== Metonic ===
- Preceded by: Solar eclipse of June 19, 1917
- Followed by: Solar eclipse of January 24, 1925

=== Tzolkinex ===
- Preceded by: Solar eclipse of February 25, 1914
- Followed by: Solar eclipse of May 19, 1928

=== Half-Saros ===
- Preceded by: Lunar eclipse of April 1, 1912
- Followed by: Lunar eclipse of April 13, 1930

=== Tritos ===
- Preceded by: Solar eclipse of May 9, 1910
- Followed by: Solar eclipse of March 7, 1932

=== Solar Saros 118 ===
- Preceded by: Solar eclipse of March 29, 1903
- Followed by: Solar eclipse of April 19, 1939

=== Inex ===
- Preceded by: Solar eclipse of April 26, 1892
- Followed by: Solar eclipse of March 18, 1950

=== Triad ===
- Preceded by: Solar eclipse of June 7, 1834
- Followed by: Solar eclipse of February 7, 2008

=== Solar eclipses of 1921–1924 ===
This eclipse is a member of a semester series. An eclipse in a semester series of solar eclipses repeats approximately every 177 days and 4 hours (a semester) at alternating nodes of the Moon's orbit.

The partial solar eclipse on July 31, 1924 occurs in the next lunar year eclipse set.

Solar eclipse series sets from 1921 to 1924
Descending node			Ascending node		
Saros	Map	Gamma	Saros	Map	Gamma
118	April 8, 1921 Annular	0.8869	123	October 1, 1921 Total	−0.9383
128	March 28, 1922 Annular	0.1711	133	September 21, 1922 Total	−0.213
138	March 17, 1923 Annular	−0.5438	143	September 10, 1923 Total	0.5149
148	March 5, 1924 Partial	−1.2232	153	August 30, 1924 Partial	1.3123

=== Saros 118 ===
This eclipse is a part of Saros series 118, repeating every 18 years, 11 days, and containing 72 events. The series started with a partial solar eclipse on May 24, 803 AD. It contains total eclipses from August 19, 947 AD through October 25, 1650; hybrid eclipses on November 4, 1668 and November 15, 1686; and annular eclipses from November 27, 1704 through April 30, 1957. The series ends at member 72 as a partial eclipse on July 15, 2083. Its eclipses are tabulated in three columns; every third eclipse in the same column is one exeligmos apart, so they all cast shadows over approximately the same parts of the Earth.

The longest duration of totality was produced by member 34 at 6 minutes, 59 seconds on May 16, 1398, and the longest duration of annularity was produced by member 59 at 1 minutes, 58 seconds on February 23, 1849. All eclipses in this series occur at the Moon’s descending node of orbit.

Series members 57–72 occur between 1801 and 2083:
57	58	59
February 1, 1813	February 12, 1831	February 23, 1849
60	61	62
March 6, 1867	March 16, 1885	March 29, 1903
63	64	65
April 8, 1921	April 19, 1939	April 30, 1957
66	67	68
May 11, 1975	May 21, 1993	June 1, 2011
69	70	71
June 12, 2029	June 23, 2047	July 3, 2065
72
July 15, 2083

=== Metonic series ===
The metonic series repeats eclipses every 19 years (6939.69 days), lasting about 5 cycles. Eclipses occur in nearly the same calendar date. In addition, the octon subseries repeats 1/5 of that or every 3.8 years (1387.94 days). All eclipses in this table occur at the Moon's descending node.

22 eclipse events between April 8, 1902 and August 31, 1989
April 7–8	January 24–25	November 12	August 31–September 1	June 19–20
108	110	112	114	116
April 8, 1902			August 31, 1913	June 19, 1917
118	120	122	124	126
April 8, 1921	January 24, 1925	November 12, 1928	August 31, 1932	June 19, 1936
128	130	132	134	136
April 7, 1940	January 25, 1944	November 12, 1947	September 1, 1951	June 20, 1955
138	140	142	144	146
April 8, 1959	January 25, 1963	November 12, 1966	August 31, 1970	June 20, 1974
148	150	152	154	
April 7, 1978	January 25, 1982	November 12, 1985	August 31, 1989	

=== Tritos series ===
This eclipse is a part of a tritos cycle, repeating at alternating nodes every 135 synodic months (≈ 3986.63 days, or 11 years minus 1 month). Their appearance and longitude are irregular due to a lack of synchronization with the anomalistic month (period of perigee), but groupings of 3 tritos cycles (≈ 33 years minus 3 months) come close (≈ 434.044 anomalistic months), so eclipses are similar in these groupings.

Series members between 1801 and 2200
March 14, 1801 (Saros 107)	February 12, 1812 (Saros 108)	January 12, 1823 (Saros 109)		November 10, 1844 (Saros 111)
		August 9, 1877 (Saros 114)	July 9, 1888 (Saros 115)	June 8, 1899 (Saros 116)
May 9, 1910 (Saros 117)	April 8, 1921 (Saros 118)	March 7, 1932 (Saros 119)	February 4, 1943 (Saros 120)	January 5, 1954 (Saros 121)
December 4, 1964 (Saros 122)	November 3, 1975 (Saros 123)	October 3, 1986 (Saros 124)	September 2, 1997 (Saros 125)	August 1, 2008 (Saros 126)
July 2, 2019 (Saros 127)	June 1, 2030 (Saros 128)	April 30, 2041 (Saros 129)	March 30, 2052 (Saros 130)	February 28, 2063 (Saros 131)
January 27, 2074 (Saros 132)	December 27, 2084 (Saros 133)	November 27, 2095 (Saros 134)	October 26, 2106 (Saros 135)	September 26, 2117 (Saros 136)
August 25, 2128 (Saros 137)	July 25, 2139 (Saros 138)	June 25, 2150 (Saros 139)	May 25, 2161 (Saros 140)	April 23, 2172 (Saros 141)
March 23, 2183 (Saros 142)	February 21, 2194 (Saros 143)			

=== Inex series ===
This eclipse is a part of the long period inex cycle, repeating at alternating nodes, every 358 synodic months (≈ 10,571.95 days, or 29 years minus 20 days). Their appearance and longitude are irregular due to a lack of synchronization with the anomalistic month (period of perigee). However, groupings of 3 inex cycles (≈ 87 years minus 2 months) comes close (≈ 1,151.02 anomalistic months), so eclipses are similar in these groupings.

Series members between 1801 and 2200
June 26, 1805 (Saros 114)	June 7, 1834 (Saros 115)	May 17, 1863 (Saros 116)
April 26, 1892 (Saros 117)	April 8, 1921 (Saros 118)	March 18, 1950 (Saros 119)
February 26, 1979 (Saros 120)	February 7, 2008 (Saros 121)	January 16, 2037 (Saros 122)
December 27, 2065 (Saros 123)	December 7, 2094 (Saros 124)	November 18, 2123 (Saros 125)
October 28, 2152 (Saros 126)	October 8, 2181 (Saros 127)	
