= Solar eclipse of May 11, 1975 =

20th-century partial solar eclipse

- Partial eclipse
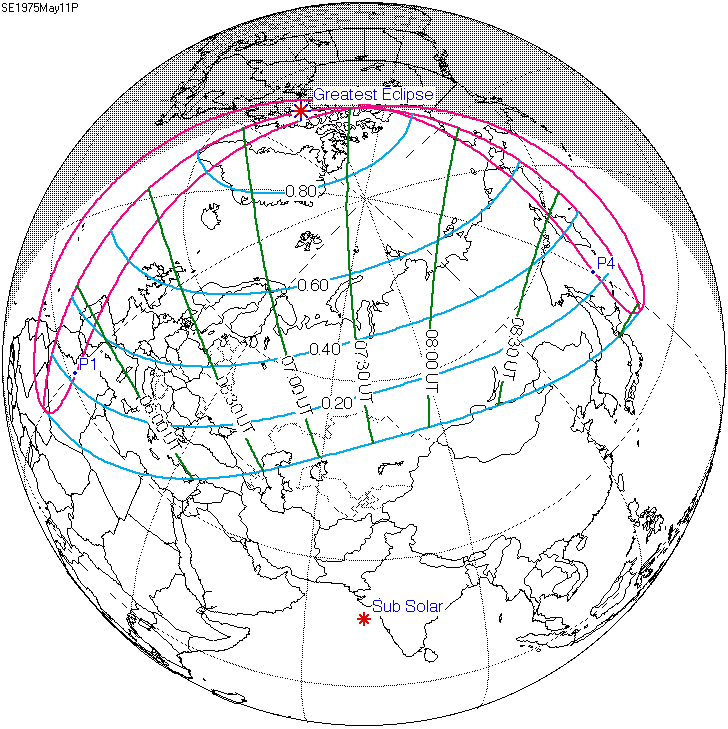
- Map
- Gamma: 1.0647
- Magnitude: 0.8636

Maximum eclipse
- Coordinates: 69.7°N 80.2°W

Times (UTC)
- Greatest eclipse: 7:17:33

References
- Saros: 118 (66 of 72)
- Catalog # (SE5000): 9454

A partial solar eclipse occurred at the Moon's descending node of orbit on Sunday, May 11, 1975, with a magnitude of 0.8636. A solar eclipse occurs when the Moon passes between Earth and the Sun, thereby totally or partly obscuring the image of the Sun for a viewer on Earth. A partial solar eclipse occurs in the polar regions of the Earth when the center of the Moon's shadow misses the Earth.

A partial eclipse was visible for parts of North Africa, Europe, North Asia, Greenland, and northern Canada.

== Eclipse details ==
Shown below are two tables displaying details about this particular solar eclipse. The first table outlines times at which the Moon's penumbra or umbra attains the specific parameter, and the second table describes various other parameters pertaining to this eclipse.

May 11, 1975 Solar Eclipse Times
Event	Time (UTC)
First Penumbral External Contact	1975 May 11 at 05:09:12.6 UTC
Ecliptic Conjunction	1975 May 11 at 07:05:38.4 UTC
Greatest Eclipse	1975 May 11 at 07:17:33.1 UTC
Equatorial Conjunction	1975 May 11 at 07:38:39.4 UTC
Last Penumbral External Contact	1975 May 11 at 09:25:38.4 UTC

May 11, 1975 Solar Eclipse Parameters
Parameter	Value
Eclipse Magnitude	0.86361
Eclipse Obscuration	0.81627
Gamma	1.06472
Sun Right Ascension	03h10m11.2s
Sun Declination	+17°44'25.7"
Sun Semi-Diameter	15'50.1"
Sun Equatorial Horizontal Parallax	08.7"
Moon Right Ascension	03h09m27.7s
Moon Declination	+18°43'13.9"
Moon Semi-Diameter	15'19.1"
Moon Equatorial Horizontal Parallax	0°56'13.2"
ΔT	45.8 s

== Eclipse season ==
This eclipse is part of an eclipse season, a period, roughly every six months, when eclipses occur. Only two (or occasionally three) eclipse seasons occur each year, and each season lasts about 35 days and repeats just short of six months (173 days) later; thus two full eclipse seasons always occur each year. Either two or three eclipses happen each eclipse season. In the sequence below, each eclipse is separated by a fortnight.

Eclipse season of May 1975
May 11 Descending node (new moon)	May 25 Ascending node (full moon)
Partial solar eclipse Solar Saros 118	Total lunar eclipse Lunar Saros 130

== Related eclipses ==
=== Eclipses in 1975 ===
- A partial solar eclipse on May 11.
- A total lunar eclipse on May 25.
- A partial solar eclipse on November 3.
- A total lunar eclipse on November 18.

=== Metonic ===
- Preceded by: Solar eclipse of July 22, 1971
- Followed by: Solar eclipse of February 26, 1979

=== Tzolkinex ===
- Preceded by: Solar eclipse of March 28, 1968
- Followed by: Solar eclipse of June 21, 1982

=== Half-Saros ===
- Preceded by: Lunar eclipse of May 4, 1966
- Followed by: Lunar eclipse of May 15, 1984

=== Tritos ===
- Preceded by: Solar eclipse of June 10, 1964
- Followed by: Solar eclipse of April 9, 1986

=== Solar Saros 118 ===
- Preceded by: Solar eclipse of April 30, 1957
- Followed by: Solar eclipse of May 21, 1993

=== Inex ===
- Preceded by: Solar eclipse of May 30, 1946
- Followed by: Solar eclipse of April 19, 2004

=== Triad ===
- Preceded by: Solar eclipse of July 9, 1888
- Followed by: Solar eclipse of March 11, 2062

=== Solar eclipses of 1975–1978 ===
This eclipse is a member of a semester series. An eclipse in a semester series of solar eclipses repeats approximately every 177 days and 4 hours (a semester) at alternating nodes of the Moon's orbit.

Solar eclipse series sets from 1975 to 1978
Descending node			Ascending node		
Saros	Map	Gamma	Saros	Map	Gamma
118	May 11, 1975 Partial	1.0647	123	November 3, 1975 Partial	−1.0248
128	April 29, 1976 Annular	0.3378	133	October 23, 1976 Total	−0.327
138	April 18, 1977 Annular	−0.399	143	October 12, 1977 Total	0.3836
148	April 7, 1978 Partial	−1.1081	153	October 2, 1978 Partial	1.1616

=== Saros 118 ===
This eclipse is a part of Saros series 118, repeating every 18 years, 11 days, and containing 72 events. The series started with a partial solar eclipse on May 24, 803 AD. It contains total eclipses from August 19, 947 AD through October 25, 1650; hybrid eclipses on November 4, 1668 and November 15, 1686; and annular eclipses from November 27, 1704 through April 30, 1957. The series ends at member 72 as a partial eclipse on July 15, 2083. Its eclipses are tabulated in three columns; every third eclipse in the same column is one exeligmos apart, so they all cast shadows over approximately the same parts of the Earth.

The longest duration of totality was produced by member 34 at 6 minutes, 59 seconds on May 16, 1398, and the longest duration of annularity was produced by member 59 at 1 minutes, 58 seconds on February 23, 1849. All eclipses in this series occur at the Moon’s descending node of orbit.

Series members 57–72 occur between 1801 and 2083:
57	58	59
February 1, 1813	February 12, 1831	February 23, 1849
60	61	62
March 6, 1867	March 16, 1885	March 29, 1903
63	64	65
April 8, 1921	April 19, 1939	April 30, 1957
66	67	68
May 11, 1975	May 21, 1993	June 1, 2011
69	70	71
June 12, 2029	June 23, 2047	July 3, 2065
72
July 15, 2083

=== Metonic series ===
The metonic series repeats eclipses every 19 years (6939.69 days), lasting about 5 cycles. Eclipses occur in nearly the same calendar date. In addition, the octon subseries repeats 1/5 of that or every 3.8 years (1387.94 days). All eclipses in this table occur at the Moon's descending node.

21 eclipse events between July 22, 1971 and July 22, 2047
July 22	May 9–11	February 26–27	December 14–15	October 2–3
116	118	120	122	124
July 22, 1971	May 11, 1975	February 26, 1979	December 15, 1982	October 3, 1986
126	128	130	132	134
July 22, 1990	May 10, 1994	February 26, 1998	December 14, 2001	October 3, 2005
136	138	140	142	144
July 22, 2009	May 10, 2013	February 26, 2017	December 14, 2020	October 2, 2024
146	148	150	152	154
July 22, 2028	May 9, 2032	February 27, 2036	December 15, 2039	October 3, 2043
156
July 22, 2047

=== Tritos series ===
This eclipse is a part of a tritos cycle, repeating at alternating nodes every 135 synodic months (≈ 3986.63 days, or 11 years minus 1 month). Their appearance and longitude are irregular due to a lack of synchronization with the anomalistic month (period of perigee), but groupings of 3 tritos cycles (≈ 33 years minus 3 months) come close (≈ 434.044 anomalistic months), so eclipses are similar in these groupings.

Series members between 1866 and 2200
March 16, 1866 (Saros 108)			December 13, 1898 (Saros 111)	
	September 12, 1931 (Saros 114)	August 12, 1942 (Saros 115)	July 11, 1953 (Saros 116)	June 10, 1964 (Saros 117)
May 11, 1975 (Saros 118)	April 9, 1986 (Saros 119)	March 9, 1997 (Saros 120)	February 7, 2008 (Saros 121)	January 6, 2019 (Saros 122)
December 5, 2029 (Saros 123)	November 4, 2040 (Saros 124)	October 4, 2051 (Saros 125)	September 3, 2062 (Saros 126)	August 3, 2073 (Saros 127)
July 3, 2084 (Saros 128)	June 2, 2095 (Saros 129)	May 3, 2106 (Saros 130)	April 2, 2117 (Saros 131)	March 1, 2128 (Saros 132)
January 30, 2139 (Saros 133)	December 30, 2149 (Saros 134)	November 27, 2160 (Saros 135)	October 29, 2171 (Saros 136)	September 27, 2182 (Saros 137)
August 26, 2193 (Saros 138)

=== Inex series ===
This eclipse is a part of the long period inex cycle, repeating at alternating nodes, every 358 synodic months (≈ 10,571.95 days, or 29 years minus 20 days). Their appearance and longitude are irregular due to a lack of synchronization with the anomalistic month (period of perigee). However, groupings of 3 inex cycles (≈ 87 years minus 2 months) comes close (≈ 1,151.02 anomalistic months), so eclipses are similar in these groupings.

Series members between 1801 and 2200
September 8, 1801 (Saros 112)	August 18, 1830 (Saros 113)	July 29, 1859 (Saros 114)
July 9, 1888 (Saros 115)	June 19, 1917 (Saros 116)	May 30, 1946 (Saros 117)
May 11, 1975 (Saros 118)	April 19, 2004 (Saros 119)	March 30, 2033 (Saros 120)
March 11, 2062 (Saros 121)	February 18, 2091 (Saros 122)	January 30, 2120 (Saros 123)
January 9, 2149 (Saros 124)	December 20, 2177 (Saros 125)	
