= Solar eclipse of March 29, 1903 =

20th-century annular solar eclipse

- Annular eclipse
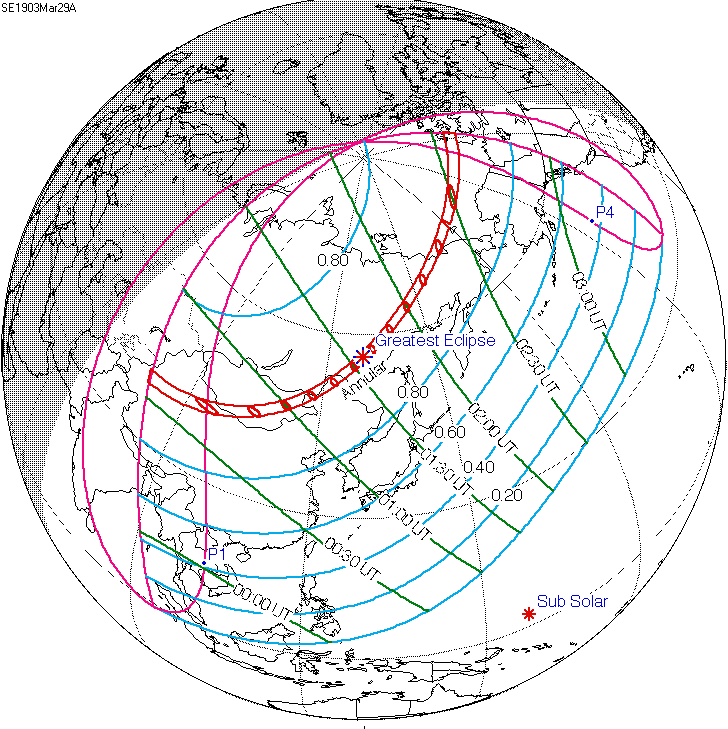
- Map
- Gamma: 0.8413
- Magnitude: 0.9767

Maximum eclipse
- Duration: 113 s (1 min 53 s)
- Coordinates: 56.2°N 130.3°E
- Max. width of band: 153 km (95 mi)

Times (UTC)
- Greatest eclipse: 1:35:23

References
- Saros: 118 (62 of 72)
- Catalog # (SE5000): 9288

An annular solar eclipse occurred at the Moon's descending node of orbit between Saturday, March 28 and Sunday, March 29, 1903, with a magnitude of 0.9767. A solar eclipse occurs when the Moon passes between Earth and the Sun, thereby totally or partly obscuring the image of the Sun for a viewer on Earth. An annular solar eclipse occurs when the Moon's apparent diameter is smaller than the Sun's, blocking most of the Sun's light and causing the Sun to look like an annulus (ring). An annular eclipse appears as a partial eclipse over a region of the Earth thousands of kilometres wide. The Moon's apparent diameter was near the average diameter because it occurred 6.7 days after apogee (on March 22, 1903, at 8:40 UTC) and 7.8 days before perigee (on April 5, 1903, at 18:40 UTC).

Annularity was visible from China (now northwestern China, Mongolia and northeastern China), Russia on March 29 (Sunday), and Northern Canada on March 28 (Saturday). A partial eclipse was visible for parts of Southeast Asia, East Asia, North Asia, Alaska, and Northwestern North America.

== Eclipse details ==
Shown below are two tables displaying details about this particular solar eclipse. The first table outlines times at which the Moon's penumbra or umbra attains the specific parameter, and the second table describes various other parameters pertaining to this eclipse.

March 29, 1903 Solar Eclipse Times
Event	Time (UTC)
First Penumbral External Contact	1903 March 28 at 23:09:08.3 UTC
First Umbral External Contact	1903 March 29 at 00:33:20.8 UTC
First Central Line	1903 March 29 at 00:35:13.8 UTC
Greatest Duration	1903 March 29 at 00:35:13.8 UTC
First Umbral Internal Contact	1903 March 29 at 00:37:09.4 UTC
Ecliptic Conjunction	1903 March 29 at 01:26:01.9 UTC
Greatest Eclipse	1903 March 29 at 01:35:22.9 UTC
Equatorial Conjunction	1903 March 29 at 02:05:13.3 UTC
Last Umbral Internal Contact	1903 March 29 at 02:33:17.3 UTC
Last Central Line	1903 March 29 at 02:35:10.0 UTC
Last Umbral External Contact	1903 March 29 at 02:37:00.1 UTC
Last Penumbral External Contact	1903 March 29 at 04:01:17.3 UTC

March 29, 1903 Solar Eclipse Parameters
Parameter	Value
Eclipse Magnitude	0.97669
Eclipse Obscuration	0.95392
Gamma	0.84126
Sun Right Ascension	00h26m26.0s
Sun Declination	+02°51'27.8"
Sun Semi-Diameter	16'01.0"
Sun Equatorial Horizontal Parallax	08.8"
Moon Right Ascension	00h25m28.1s
Moon Declination	+03°37'00.1"
Moon Semi-Diameter	15'30.9"
Moon Equatorial Horizontal Parallax	0°56'56.5"
ΔT	1.5 s

== Eclipse season ==
This eclipse is part of an eclipse season, a period, roughly every six months, when eclipses occur. Only two (or occasionally three) eclipse seasons occur each year, and each season lasts about 35 days and repeats just short of six months (173 days) later; thus two full eclipse seasons always occur each year. Either two or three eclipses happen each eclipse season. In the sequence below, each eclipse is separated by a fortnight.

Eclipse season of March–April 1903
March 29 Descending node (new moon)	April 12 Ascending node (full moon)
Annular solar eclipse Solar Saros 118	Partial lunar eclipse Lunar Saros 130

== Related eclipses ==
=== Eclipses in 1903 ===
- An annular solar eclipse on March 29.
- A partial lunar eclipse on April 12.
- A total solar eclipse on September 21.
- A partial lunar eclipse on October 6.

=== Metonic ===
- Preceded by: Solar eclipse of June 8, 1899
- Followed by: Solar eclipse of January 14, 1907

=== Tzolkinex ===
- Preceded by: Solar eclipse of February 13, 1896
- Followed by: Solar eclipse of May 9, 1910

=== Half-Saros ===
- Preceded by: Lunar eclipse of March 21, 1894
- Followed by: Lunar eclipse of April 1, 1912

=== Tritos ===
- Preceded by: Solar eclipse of April 26, 1892
- Followed by: Solar eclipse of February 25, 1914

=== Solar Saros 118 ===
- Preceded by: Solar eclipse of March 16, 1885
- Followed by: Solar eclipse of April 8, 1921

=== Inex ===
- Preceded by: Solar eclipse of April 16, 1874
- Followed by: Solar eclipse of March 7, 1932

=== Triad ===
- Preceded by: Solar eclipse of May 27, 1816
- Followed by: Solar eclipse of January 26, 1990

=== Solar eclipses of 1902–1906 ===
This eclipse is a member of a semester series. An eclipse in a semester series of solar eclipses repeats approximately every 177 days and 4 hours (a semester) at alternating nodes of the Moon's orbit.

The partial solar eclipses on May 7, 1902 and October 31, 1902 occur in the previous lunar year eclipse set, and the partial solar eclipse on July 21, 1906 occurs in the next lunar year eclipse set.

Solar eclipse series sets from 1902 to 1906
Descending node			Ascending node		
Saros	Map	Gamma	Saros	Map	Gamma
108	April 8, 1902 Partial	1.5024	113	October 1, 1902	
118	March 29, 1903 Annular	0.8413	123	September 21, 1903 Total	−0.8967
128	March 17, 1904 Annular	0.1299	133	September 9, 1904 Total	−0.1625
138	March 6, 1905 Annular	−0.5768	143	August 30, 1905 Total	0.5708
148	February 23, 1906 Partial	−1.2479	153	August 20, 1906 Partial	1.3731

=== Saros 118 ===
This eclipse is a part of Saros series 118, repeating every 18 years, 11 days, and containing 72 events. The series started with a partial solar eclipse on May 24, 803 AD. It contains total eclipses from August 19, 947 AD through October 25, 1650; hybrid eclipses on November 4, 1668 and November 15, 1686; and annular eclipses from November 27, 1704 through April 30, 1957. The series ends at member 72 as a partial eclipse on July 15, 2083. Its eclipses are tabulated in three columns; every third eclipse in the same column is one exeligmos apart, so they all cast shadows over approximately the same parts of the Earth.

The longest duration of totality was produced by member 34 at 6 minutes, 59 seconds on May 16, 1398, and the longest duration of annularity was produced by member 59 at 1 minutes, 58 seconds on February 23, 1849. All eclipses in this series occur at the Moon’s descending node of orbit.

Series members 57–72 occur between 1801 and 2083:
57	58	59
February 1, 1813	February 12, 1831	February 23, 1849
60	61	62
March 6, 1867	March 16, 1885	March 29, 1903
63	64	65
April 8, 1921	April 19, 1939	April 30, 1957
66	67	68
May 11, 1975	May 21, 1993	June 1, 2011
69	70	71
June 12, 2029	June 23, 2047	July 3, 2065
72
July 15, 2083

=== Metonic series ===
The metonic series repeats eclipses every 19 years (6939.69 days), lasting about 5 cycles. Eclipses occur in nearly the same calendar date. In addition, the octon subseries repeats 1/5 of that or every 3.8 years (1387.94 days). All eclipses in this table occur at the Moon's descending node.

22 eclipse events between March 27, 1884 and August 20, 1971
March 27–29	January 14	November 1–2	August 20–21	June 8
108	110	112	114	116
March 27, 1884			August 20, 1895	June 8, 1899
118	120	122	124	126
March 29, 1903	January 14, 1907	November 2, 1910	August 21, 1914	June 8, 1918
128	130	132	134	136
March 28, 1922	January 14, 1926	November 1, 1929	August 21, 1933	June 8, 1937
138	140	142	144	146
March 27, 1941	January 14, 1945	November 1, 1948	August 20, 1952	June 8, 1956
148	150	152	154	
March 27, 1960	January 14, 1964	November 2, 1967	August 20, 1971	

=== Tritos series ===
This eclipse is a part of a tritos cycle, repeating at alternating nodes every 135 synodic months (≈ 3986.63 days, or 11 years minus 1 month). Their appearance and longitude are irregular due to a lack of synchronization with the anomalistic month (period of perigee), but groupings of 3 tritos cycles (≈ 33 years minus 3 months) come close (≈ 434.044 anomalistic months), so eclipses are similar in these groupings.

Series members between 1801 and 2200
January 1, 1805 (Saros 109)		October 31, 1826 (Saros 111)		August 28, 1848 (Saros 113)
July 29, 1859 (Saros 114)	June 28, 1870 (Saros 115)	May 27, 1881 (Saros 116)	April 26, 1892 (Saros 117)	March 29, 1903 (Saros 118)
February 25, 1914 (Saros 119)	January 24, 1925 (Saros 120)	December 25, 1935 (Saros 121)	November 23, 1946 (Saros 122)	October 23, 1957 (Saros 123)
September 22, 1968 (Saros 124)	August 22, 1979 (Saros 125)	July 22, 1990 (Saros 126)	June 21, 2001 (Saros 127)	May 20, 2012 (Saros 128)
April 20, 2023 (Saros 129)	March 20, 2034 (Saros 130)	February 16, 2045 (Saros 131)	January 16, 2056 (Saros 132)	December 17, 2066 (Saros 133)
November 15, 2077 (Saros 134)	October 14, 2088 (Saros 135)	September 14, 2099 (Saros 136)	August 15, 2110 (Saros 137)	July 14, 2121 (Saros 138)
June 13, 2132 (Saros 139)	May 14, 2143 (Saros 140)	April 12, 2154 (Saros 141)	March 12, 2165 (Saros 142)	February 10, 2176 (Saros 143)
January 9, 2187 (Saros 144)	December 9, 2197 (Saros 145)			

=== Inex series ===
This eclipse is a part of the long period inex cycle, repeating at alternating nodes, every 358 synodic months (≈ 10,571.95 days, or 29 years minus 20 days). Their appearance and longitude are irregular due to a lack of synchronization with the anomalistic month (period of perigee). However, groupings of 3 inex cycles (≈ 87 years minus 2 months) comes close (≈ 1,151.02 anomalistic months), so eclipses are similar in these groupings.

Series members between 1801 and 2200
May 27, 1816 (Saros 115)	May 6, 1845 (Saros 116)	April 16, 1874 (Saros 117)
March 29, 1903 (Saros 118)	March 7, 1932 (Saros 119)	February 15, 1961 (Saros 120)
January 26, 1990 (Saros 121)	January 6, 2019 (Saros 122)	December 16, 2047 (Saros 123)
November 26, 2076 (Saros 124)	November 6, 2105 (Saros 125)	October 17, 2134 (Saros 126)
September 28, 2163 (Saros 127)	September 6, 2192 (Saros 128)	
