= Solar eclipse of June 2, 2095 =

Total eclipse

- Total eclipse
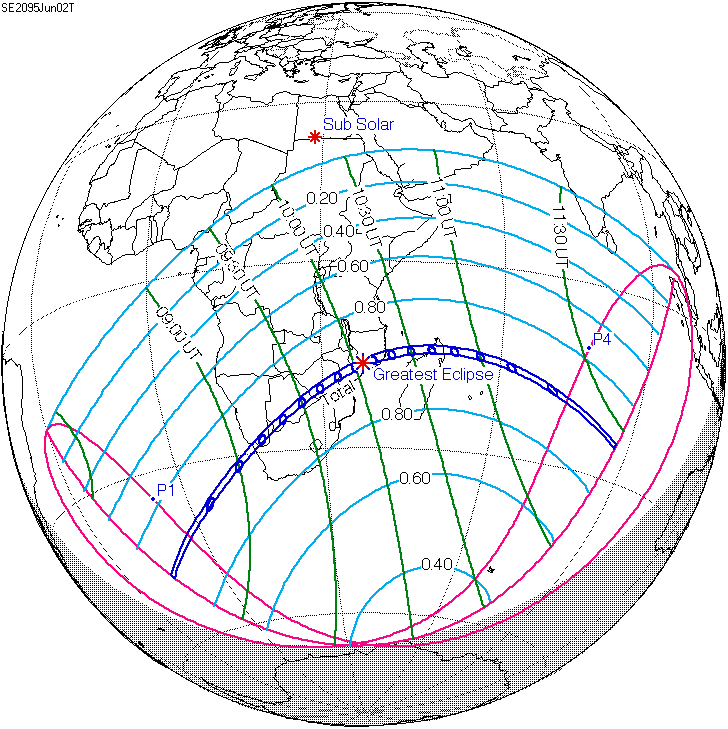
- Map
- Gamma: −0.6396
- Magnitude: 1.0332

Maximum eclipse
- Duration: 3m s
- Coordinates: 16.7°S 37.2°E
- Max. width of band: 145 km (90 mi)

Times (UTC)
- Greatest eclipse: 10:07:40

References
- Saros: 129 (56 of 80)
- Catalog # (SE5000): 9722

A total solar eclipse will occur at the Moon's ascending node of orbit on Thursday, June 2, 2095, with a magnitude of 1.0332. A solar eclipse occurs when the Moon passes between Earth and the Sun, thereby totally or partly obscuring the image of the Sun for a viewer on Earth. A total solar eclipse occurs when the Moon's apparent diameter is larger than the Sun's, blocking all direct sunlight, turning day into darkness. Totality occurs in a narrow path across Earth's surface, with the partial solar eclipse visible over a surrounding region thousands of kilometres wide. Occurring about 3 days after perigee (on May 30, 2095, at 9:45 UTC), the Moon's apparent diameter will be larger.

The path of totality will be visible from parts of South Africa, Namibia, Botswana, Zimbabwe, Mozambique, extreme southern Malawi, and Madagascar. A partial solar eclipse will also be visible for parts of Southern Africa, Central Africa, East Africa, the southern Middle East, and southern India.

== Eclipse details ==
Shown below are two tables displaying details about this particular solar eclipse. The first table outlines times at which the Moon's penumbra or umbra attains the specific parameter, and the second table describes various other parameters pertaining to this eclipse.

June 2, 2095 Solar Eclipse Times
Event	Time (UTC)
First Penumbral External Contact	2095 June 2 at 07:37:43.5 UTC
First Umbral External Contact	2095 June 2 at 08:44:51.4 UTC
First Central Line	2095 June 2 at 08:45:36.7 UTC
First Umbral Internal Contact	2095 June 2 at 08:46:22.2 UTC
Equatorial Conjunction	2095 June 2 at 09:51:40.9 UTC
Ecliptic Conjunction	2095 June 2 at 10:00:57.6 UTC
Greatest Eclipse	2095 June 2 at 10:07:39.9 UTC
Greatest Duration	2095 June 2 at 10:08:57.6 UTC
Last Umbral Internal Contact	2095 June 2 at 11:29:10.9 UTC
Last Central Line	2095 June 2 at 11:29:53.9 UTC
Last Umbral External Contact	2095 June 2 at 11:30:36.8 UTC
Last Penumbral External Contact	2095 June 2 at 12:37:48.2 UTC

June 2, 2095 Solar Eclipse Parameters
Parameter	Value
Eclipse Magnitude	1.03320
Eclipse Obscuration	1.06750
Gamma	−0.63959
Sun Right Ascension	04h42m53.4s
Sun Declination	+22°14'41.8"
Sun Semi-Diameter	15'46.4"
Sun Equatorial Horizontal Parallax	08.7"
Moon Right Ascension	04h43m30.2s
Moon Declination	+21°37'59.7"
Moon Semi-Diameter	16'05.6"
Moon Equatorial Horizontal Parallax	0°59'03.8"
ΔT	119.2 s

== Eclipse season ==
This eclipse is part of an eclipse season, a period, roughly every six months, when eclipses occur. Only two (or occasionally three) eclipse seasons occur each year, and each season lasts about 35 days and repeats just short of six months (173 days) later; thus two full eclipse seasons always occur each year. Either two or three eclipses happen each eclipse season. In the sequence below, each eclipse is separated by a fortnight.

Eclipse season of June 2095
June 2 Ascending node (new moon)	June 17 Descending node (full moon)
Total solar eclipse Solar Saros 129	Partial lunar eclipse Lunar Saros 141

== Related eclipses ==
=== Eclipses in 2095 ===
- A total solar eclipse on June 2.
- A partial lunar eclipse on June 17.
- An annular solar eclipse on November 27.
- A partial lunar eclipse on December 11.

=== Metonic ===
- Preceded by: Solar eclipse of August 15, 2091
- Followed by: Solar eclipse of March 21, 2099

=== Tzolkinex ===
- Preceded by: Solar eclipse of April 21, 2088
- Followed by: Solar eclipse of July 15, 2102

=== Half-Saros ===
- Preceded by: Lunar eclipse of May 28, 2086
- Followed by: Lunar eclipse of June 8, 2104

=== Tritos ===
- Preceded by: Solar eclipse of July 3, 2084
- Followed by: Solar eclipse of May 3, 2106

=== Solar Saros 129 ===
- Preceded by: Solar eclipse of May 22, 2077
- Followed by: Solar eclipse of June 13, 2113

=== Inex ===
- Preceded by: Solar eclipse of June 22, 2066
- Followed by: Solar eclipse of May 14, 2124

=== Triad ===
- Preceded by: Solar eclipse of August 1, 2008
- Followed by: Solar eclipse of April 3, 2182

=== Solar eclipses of 2094–2098 ===
This eclipse is a member of a semester series. An eclipse in a semester series of solar eclipses repeats approximately every 177 days and 4 hours (a semester) at alternating nodes of the Moon's orbit.

The solar eclipses on January 16, 2094 (total) and July 12, 2094 (partial) occur in the previous lunar year eclipse set, and the partial solar eclipses on April 1, 2098 and September 25, 2098 occur in the next lunar year eclipse set.

Solar eclipse series sets from 2094 to 2098
Ascending node			Descending node		
Saros	Map	Gamma	Saros	Map	Gamma
119	June 13, 2094 Partial	−1.4613	124	December 7, 2094 Partial	1.1547
129	June 2, 2095 Total	−0.6396	134	November 27, 2095 Annular	0.4903
139	May 22, 2096 Total	0.1196	144	November 15, 2096 Annular	−0.20
149	May 11, 2097 Total	0.8516	154	November 4, 2097 Annular	−0.8926
159	May 1, 2098		164	October 24, 2098 Partial	−1.5407

=== Saros 129 ===
This eclipse is a part of Saros series 129, repeating every 18 years, 11 days, and containing 80 events. The series started with a partial solar eclipse on October 3, 1103. It contains annular eclipses from May 6, 1464 through March 18, 1969; hybrid eclipses from March 29, 1987 through April 20, 2023; and total eclipses from April 30, 2041 through July 26, 2185. The series ends at member 80 as a partial eclipse on February 21, 2528. Its eclipses are tabulated in three columns; every third eclipse in the same column is one exeligmos apart, so they all cast shadows over approximately the same parts of the Earth.

The longest duration of annularity was produced by member 34 at 5 minutes, 10 seconds on October 4, 1698, and the longest duration of totality will be produced by member 58 at 3 minutes, 43 seconds on June 25, 2131. All eclipses in this series occur at the Moon’s ascending node of orbit.

Series members 40–61 occur between 1801 and 2200:
40	41	42
December 10, 1806	December 20, 1824	December 31, 1842
43	44	45
January 11, 1861	January 22, 1879	February 1, 1897
46	47	48
February 14, 1915	February 24, 1933	March 7, 1951
49	50	51
March 18, 1969	March 29, 1987	April 8, 2005
52	53	54
April 20, 2023	April 30, 2041	May 11, 2059
55	56	57
May 22, 2077	June 2, 2095	June 13, 2113
58	59	60
June 25, 2131	July 5, 2149	July 16, 2167
61
July 26, 2185

=== Metonic series ===
The metonic series repeats eclipses every 19 years (6939.69 days), lasting about 5 cycles. Eclipses occur in nearly the same calendar date. In addition, the octon subseries repeats 1/5 of that or every 3.8 years (1387.94 days). All eclipses in this table occur at the Moon's ascending node.

22 eclipse events between June 1, 2076 and October 27, 2163
June 1–3	March 21–22	January 7–8	October 26–27	August 14–15
119	121	123	125	127
June 1, 2076	March 21, 2080	January 7, 2084	October 26, 2087	August 15, 2091
129	131	133	135	137
June 2, 2095	March 21, 2099	January 8, 2103	October 26, 2106	August 15, 2110
139	141	143	145	147
June 3, 2114	March 22, 2118	January 8, 2122	October 26, 2125	August 15, 2129
149	151	153	155	157
June 3, 2133	March 21, 2137	January 8, 2141	October 26, 2144	August 14, 2148
159	161	163	165	
June 3, 2152			October 27, 2163	

=== Tritos series ===
This eclipse is a part of a tritos cycle, repeating at alternating nodes every 135 synodic months (≈ 3986.63 days, or 11 years minus 1 month). Their appearance and longitude are irregular due to a lack of synchronization with the anomalistic month (period of perigee), but groupings of 3 tritos cycles (≈ 33 years minus 3 months) come close (≈ 434.044 anomalistic months), so eclipses are similar in these groupings.

Series members between 1866 and 2200
March 16, 1866 (Saros 108)			December 13, 1898 (Saros 111)	
	September 12, 1931 (Saros 114)	August 12, 1942 (Saros 115)	July 11, 1953 (Saros 116)	June 10, 1964 (Saros 117)
May 11, 1975 (Saros 118)	April 9, 1986 (Saros 119)	March 9, 1997 (Saros 120)	February 7, 2008 (Saros 121)	January 6, 2019 (Saros 122)
December 5, 2029 (Saros 123)	November 4, 2040 (Saros 124)	October 4, 2051 (Saros 125)	September 3, 2062 (Saros 126)	August 3, 2073 (Saros 127)
July 3, 2084 (Saros 128)	June 2, 2095 (Saros 129)	May 3, 2106 (Saros 130)	April 2, 2117 (Saros 131)	March 1, 2128 (Saros 132)
January 30, 2139 (Saros 133)	December 30, 2149 (Saros 134)	November 27, 2160 (Saros 135)	October 29, 2171 (Saros 136)	September 27, 2182 (Saros 137)
August 26, 2193 (Saros 138)

=== Inex series ===
This eclipse is a part of the long period inex cycle, repeating at alternating nodes, every 358 synodic months (≈ 10,571.95 days, or 29 years minus 20 days). Their appearance and longitude are irregular due to a lack of synchronization with the anomalistic month (period of perigee). However, groupings of 3 inex cycles (≈ 87 years minus 2 months) comes close (≈ 1,151.02 anomalistic months), so eclipses are similar in these groupings.

Series members between 1801 and 2200
December 21, 1805 (Saros 119)	November 30, 1834 (Saros 120)	November 11, 1863 (Saros 121)
October 20, 1892 (Saros 122)	October 1, 1921 (Saros 123)	September 12, 1950 (Saros 124)
August 22, 1979 (Saros 125)	August 1, 2008 (Saros 126)	July 13, 2037 (Saros 127)
June 22, 2066 (Saros 128)	June 2, 2095 (Saros 129)	May 14, 2124 (Saros 130)
April 23, 2153 (Saros 131)	April 3, 2182 (Saros 132)	
