= Solar eclipse of December 7, 2094 =

Future partial solar eclipse

- Partial eclipse
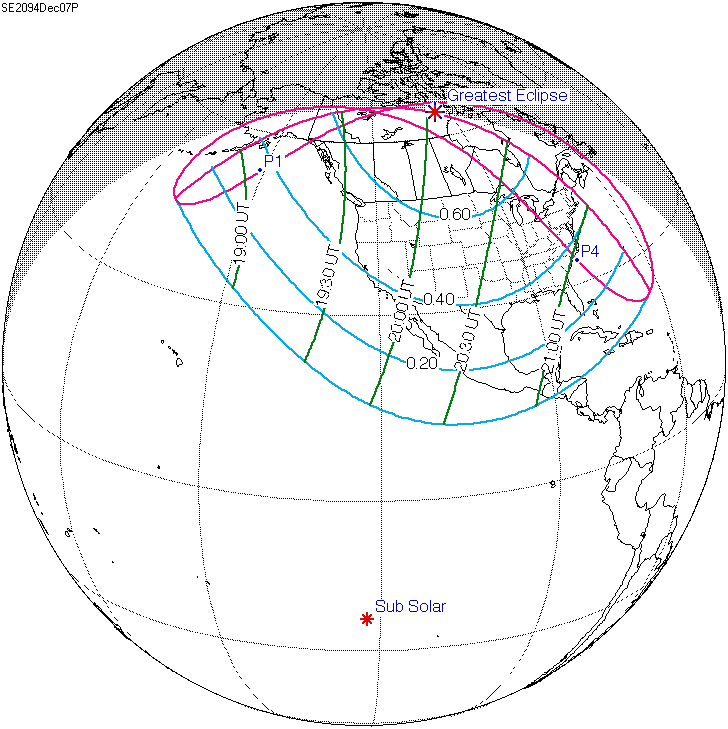
- Map
- Gamma: 1.1547
- Magnitude: 0.7046

Maximum eclipse
- Coordinates: 10.5°S 39°E
- Max. width of band: 142 km (88 mi)

Times (UTC)
- Greatest eclipse: 20:05:56

References
- Saros: 124 (59 of 73)
- Catalog # (SE5000): 9721

A partial solar eclipse will occur at the Moon's descending node of orbit on Tuesday, December 7, 2094, with a magnitude of 0.7046. A solar eclipse occurs when the Moon passes between Earth and the Sun, thereby totally or partly obscuring the image of the Sun for a viewer on Earth. A partial solar eclipse occurs in the polar regions of the Earth when the center of the Moon's shadow misses the Earth.

This will be the last of four solar eclipses in 2094, with the others occurring on January 16, June 13, and July 12.

The partial solar eclipse will be visible for much of North America.

== Eclipse details ==
Shown below are two tables displaying details about this particular solar eclipse. The first table outlines times at which the Moon's penumbra or umbra attains the specific parameter, and the second table describes various other parameters pertaining to this eclipse.

December 7, 2094 Solar Eclipse Times
Event	Time (UTC)
First Penumbral External Contact	2094 December 7 at 18:10:55.7 UTC
Equatorial Conjunction	2094 December 7 at 19:39:53.8 UTC
Ecliptic Conjunction	2094 December 7 at 19:53:21.2 UTC
Greatest Eclipse	2094 December 7 at 20:05:55.6 UTC
Last Penumbral External Contact	2094 December 7 at 22:01:01.1 UTC

December 7, 2094 Solar Eclipse Parameters
Parameter	Value
Eclipse Magnitude	0.70458
Eclipse Obscuration	0.62218
Gamma	1.15470
Sun Right Ascension	17h00m09.4s
Sun Declination	-22°42'52.2"
Sun Semi-Diameter	16'13.9"
Sun Equatorial Horizontal Parallax	08.9"
Moon Right Ascension	17h01m06.4s
Moon Declination	-21°37'52.2"
Moon Semi-Diameter	15'41.5"
Moon Equatorial Horizontal Parallax	0°57'35.2"
ΔT	118.7 s

== Eclipse season ==
This eclipse is part of an eclipse season, a period, roughly every six months, when eclipses occur. Only two (or occasionally three) eclipse seasons occur each year, and each season lasts about 35 days and repeats just short of six months (173 days) later; thus two full eclipse seasons always occur each year. Either two or three eclipses happen each eclipse season. In the sequence below, each eclipse is separated by a fortnight.

Eclipse season of December 2094
December 7 Descending node (new moon)	December 21 Ascending node (full moon)
Partial solar eclipse Solar Saros 124	Total lunar eclipse Lunar Saros 136

== Related eclipses ==
=== Eclipses in 2094 ===
- A partial lunar eclipse on January 1.
- A total solar eclipse on January 16.
- A partial solar eclipse on June 13.
- A total lunar eclipse on June 28.
- A partial solar eclipse on July 12.
- A partial solar eclipse on December 7.
- A total lunar eclipse on December 21.

=== Metonic ===
- Preceded by: Solar eclipse of February 18, 2091
- Followed by: Solar eclipse of September 25, 2098

=== Tzolkinex ===
- Preceded by: Solar eclipse of October 26, 2087
- Followed by: Solar eclipse of January 19, 2102

=== Half-Saros ===
- Preceded by: Lunar eclipse of December 1, 2085
- Followed by: Lunar eclipse of December 13, 2103

=== Tritos ===
- Preceded by: Solar eclipse of January 7, 2084
- Followed by: Solar eclipse of November 6, 2105

=== Solar Saros 124 ===
- Preceded by: Solar eclipse of November 26, 2076
- Followed by: Solar eclipse of December 19, 2112

=== Inex ===
- Preceded by: Solar eclipse of December 27, 2065
- Followed by: Solar eclipse of November 18, 2123

=== Triad ===
- Preceded by: Solar eclipse of February 7, 2008
- Followed by: Solar eclipse of October 8, 2181

=== Solar eclipses of 2094–2098 ===
This eclipse is a member of a semester series. An eclipse in a semester series of solar eclipses repeats approximately every 177 days and 4 hours (a semester) at alternating nodes of the Moon's orbit.

The solar eclipses on January 16, 2094 (total) and July 12, 2094 (partial) occur in the previous lunar year eclipse set, and the partial solar eclipses on April 1, 2098 and September 25, 2098 occur in the next lunar year eclipse set.

Solar eclipse series sets from 2094 to 2098
Ascending node			Descending node		
Saros	Map	Gamma	Saros	Map	Gamma
119	June 13, 2094 Partial	−1.4613	124	December 7, 2094 Partial	1.1547
129	June 2, 2095 Total	−0.6396	134	November 27, 2095 Annular	0.4903
139	May 22, 2096 Total	0.1196	144	November 15, 2096 Annular	−0.20
149	May 11, 2097 Total	0.8516	154	November 4, 2097 Annular	−0.8926
159	May 1, 2098		164	October 24, 2098 Partial	−1.5407

=== Saros 124 ===
This eclipse is a part of Saros series 124, repeating every 18 years, 11 days, and containing 73 events. The series started with a partial solar eclipse on March 6, 1049. It contains total eclipses from June 12, 1211 through September 22, 1968, and a hybrid eclipse on October 3, 1986. There are no annular eclipses in this set. The series ends at member 73 as a partial eclipse on May 11, 2347. Its eclipses are tabulated in three columns; every third eclipse in the same column is one exeligmos apart, so they all cast shadows over approximately the same parts of the Earth.

The longest duration of totality was produced by member 39 at 5 minutes, 46 seconds on May 3, 1734. All eclipses in this series occur at the Moon’s descending node of orbit.

Series members 43–64 occur between 1801 and 2200:
43	44	45
June 16, 1806	June 26, 1824	July 8, 1842
46	47	48
July 18, 1860	July 29, 1878	August 9, 1896
49	50	51
August 21, 1914	August 31, 1932	September 12, 1950
52	53	54
September 22, 1968	October 3, 1986	October 14, 2004
55	56	57
October 25, 2022	November 4, 2040	November 16, 2058
58	59	60
November 26, 2076	December 7, 2094	December 19, 2112
61	62	63
December 30, 2130	January 9, 2149	January 21, 2167
64
January 31, 2185

=== Metonic series ===
The metonic series repeats eclipses every 19 years (6939.69 days), lasting about 5 cycles. Eclipses occur in nearly the same calendar date. In addition, the octon subseries repeats 1/5 of that or every 3.8 years (1387.94 days). All eclipses in this table occur at the Moon's descending node.

22 eclipse events between July 15, 2083 and December 7, 2170
July 14–15	May 2–3	February 18–19	December 7–8	September 25–26
118	120	122	124	126
July 15, 2083	May 2, 2087	February 18, 2091	December 7, 2094	September 25, 2098
128	130	132	134	136
July 15, 2102	May 3, 2106	February 18, 2110	December 8, 2113	September 26, 2117
138	140	142	144	146
July 14, 2121	May 3, 2125	February 18, 2129	December 7, 2132	September 26, 2136
148	150	152	154	156
July 14, 2140	May 3, 2144	February 19, 2148	December 8, 2151	September 26, 2155
158	160	162	164	
July 15, 2159			December 7, 2170	

=== Tritos series ===
This eclipse is a part of a tritos cycle, repeating at alternating nodes every 135 synodic months (≈ 3986.63 days, or 11 years minus 1 month). Their appearance and longitude are irregular due to a lack of synchronization with the anomalistic month (period of perigee), but groupings of 3 tritos cycles (≈ 33 years minus 3 months) come close (≈ 434.044 anomalistic months), so eclipses are similar in these groupings.

Series members between 2018 and 2200
July 13, 2018 (Saros 117)	June 12, 2029 (Saros 118)	May 11, 2040 (Saros 119)	April 11, 2051 (Saros 120)	March 11, 2062 (Saros 121)
February 7, 2073 (Saros 122)	January 7, 2084 (Saros 123)	December 7, 2094 (Saros 124)	November 6, 2105 (Saros 125)	October 6, 2116 (Saros 126)
September 6, 2127 (Saros 127)	August 5, 2138 (Saros 128)	July 5, 2149 (Saros 129)	June 4, 2160 (Saros 130)	May 5, 2171 (Saros 131)
April 3, 2182 (Saros 132)	March 3, 2193 (Saros 133)			

=== Inex series ===
This eclipse is a part of the long period inex cycle, repeating at alternating nodes, every 358 synodic months (≈ 10,571.95 days, or 29 years minus 20 days). Their appearance and longitude are irregular due to a lack of synchronization with the anomalistic month (period of perigee). However, groupings of 3 inex cycles (≈ 87 years minus 2 months) comes close (≈ 1,151.02 anomalistic months), so eclipses are similar in these groupings.

Series members between 1801 and 2200
June 26, 1805 (Saros 114)	June 7, 1834 (Saros 115)	May 17, 1863 (Saros 116)
April 26, 1892 (Saros 117)	April 8, 1921 (Saros 118)	March 18, 1950 (Saros 119)
February 26, 1979 (Saros 120)	February 7, 2008 (Saros 121)	January 16, 2037 (Saros 122)
December 27, 2065 (Saros 123)	December 7, 2094 (Saros 124)	November 18, 2123 (Saros 125)
October 28, 2152 (Saros 126)	October 8, 2181 (Saros 127)	
