= Solar eclipse of January 7, 2084 =

Future partial solar eclipse

- Partial eclipse
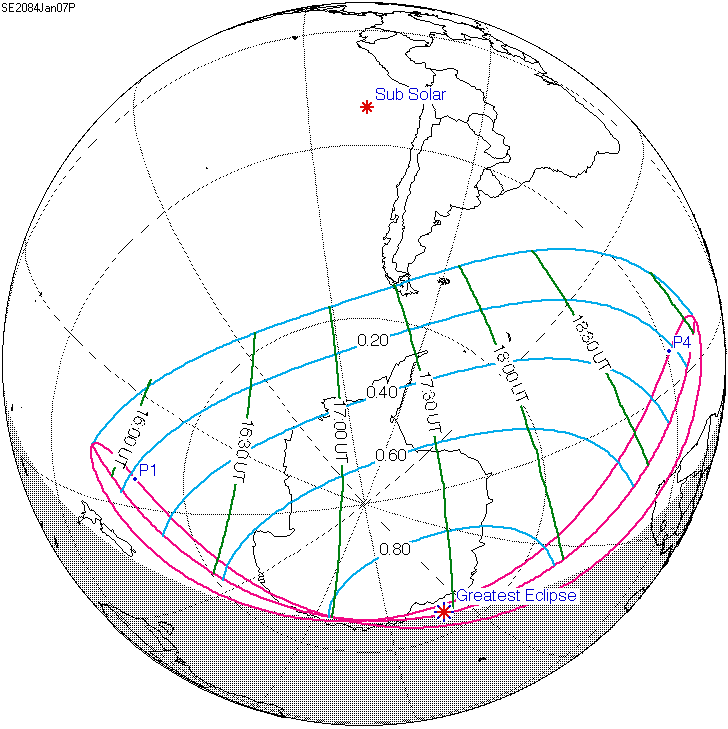
- Map
- Gamma: −1.0715
- Magnitude: 0.8723

Maximum eclipse
- Coordinates: 64.4°S 68.5°E

Times (UTC)
- Greatest eclipse: 17:30:23

References
- Saros: 123 (57 of 70)
- Catalog # (SE5000): 9696

A partial solar eclipse will occur at the Moon's ascending node of orbit on Friday, January 7, 2084, with a magnitude of 0.8723. A solar eclipse occurs when the Moon passes between Earth and the Sun, thereby totally or partly obscuring the image of the Sun for a viewer on Earth. A partial solar eclipse occurs in the polar regions of the Earth when the center of the Moon's shadow misses the Earth.

The partial solar eclipse will be visible for parts of Antarctica and extreme southern South America.

== Eclipse details ==
Shown below are two tables displaying details about this particular solar eclipse. The first table outlines times at which the Moon's penumbra or umbra attains the specific parameter, and the second table describes various other parameters pertaining to this eclipse.

January 7, 2084 Solar Eclipse Times
Event	Time (UTC)
First Penumbral External Contact	2084 January 7 at 15:36:03.5 UTC
Equatorial Conjunction	2084 January 7 at 17:05:00.8 UTC
Ecliptic Conjunction	2084 January 7 at 17:19:39.5 UTC
Greatest Eclipse	2084 January 7 at 17:30:23.5 UTC
Last Penumbral External Contact	2084 January 7 at 19:24:56.5 UTC

January 7, 2084 Solar Eclipse Parameters
Parameter	Value
Eclipse Magnitude	0.87234
Eclipse Obscuration	0.84393
Gamma	−1.07151
Sun Right Ascension	19h15m11.8s
Sun Declination	-22°18'17.9"
Sun Semi-Diameter	16'15.9"
Sun Equatorial Horizontal Parallax	08.9"
Moon Right Ascension	19h16m15.2s
Moon Declination	-23°21'56.0"
Moon Semi-Diameter	16'38.6"
Moon Equatorial Horizontal Parallax	1°01'05.0"
ΔT	108.8 s

== Eclipse season ==
This eclipse is part of an eclipse season, a period, roughly every six months, when eclipses occur. Only two (or occasionally three) eclipse seasons occur each year, and each season lasts about 35 days and repeats just short of six months (173 days) later; thus two full eclipse seasons always occur each year. Either two or three eclipses happen each eclipse season. In the sequence below, each eclipse is separated by a fortnight.

Eclipse season of January 2084
January 7 Ascending node (new moon)	January 22 Descending node (full moon)
Partial solar eclipse Solar Saros 123	Total lunar eclipse Lunar Saros 135

== Related eclipses ==
=== Eclipses in 2084 ===
- A partial solar eclipse on January 7.
- A total lunar eclipse on January 22.
- An annular solar eclipse on July 3.
- A partial lunar eclipse on July 17.
- A total solar eclipse on December 27.

=== Metonic ===
- Preceded by: Solar eclipse of March 21, 2080
- Followed by: Solar eclipse of October 26, 2087

=== Tzolkinex ===
- Preceded by: Solar eclipse of November 26, 2076
- Followed by: Solar eclipse of February 18, 2091

=== Half-Saros ===
- Preceded by: Lunar eclipse of January 2, 2075
- Followed by: Lunar eclipse of January 12, 2093

=== Tritos ===
- Preceded by: Solar eclipse of February 7, 2073
- Followed by: Solar eclipse of December 7, 2094

=== Solar Saros 123 ===
- Preceded by: Solar eclipse of December 27, 2065
- Followed by: Solar eclipse of January 19, 2102

=== Inex ===
- Preceded by: Solar eclipse of January 27, 2055
- Followed by: Solar eclipse of December 19, 2112

=== Triad ===
- Preceded by: Solar eclipse of March 9, 1997
- Followed by: Solar eclipse of November 8, 2170

=== Solar eclipses of 2083–2087 ===
This eclipse is a member of a semester series. An eclipse in a semester series of solar eclipses repeats approximately every 177 days and 4 hours (a semester) at alternating nodes of the Moon's orbit.

The partial solar eclipses on February 16, 2083 and August 13, 2083 occur in the previous lunar year eclipse set, and the partial solar eclipses on May 2, 2087 and October 26, 2087 occur in the next lunar year eclipse set.

Solar eclipse series sets from 2083 to 2087
Descending node			Ascending node		
Saros	Map	Gamma	Saros	Map	Gamma
118	July 15, 2083 Partial	1.5465	123	January 7, 2084 Partial	−1.0715
128	July 3, 2084 Annular	0.8208	133	December 27, 2084 Total	−0.4094
138	June 22, 2085 Annular	0.0452	143	December 16, 2085 Annular	0.2786
148	June 11, 2086 Total	−0.7215	153	December 6, 2086 Partial	1.0194
158	June 1, 2087 Partial	−1.4186			

=== Saros 123 ===
This eclipse is a part of Saros series 123, repeating every 18 years, 11 days, and containing 70 events. The series started with a partial solar eclipse on April 29, 1074. It contains annular eclipses from July 2, 1182 through April 19, 1651; hybrid eclipses from April 30, 1669 through May 22, 1705; and total eclipses from June 3, 1723 through October 23, 1957. The series ends at member 70 as a partial eclipse on May 31, 2318. Its eclipses are tabulated in three columns; every third eclipse in the same column is one exeligmos apart, so they all cast shadows over approximately the same parts of the Earth.

The longest duration of annularity was produced by member 19 at 8 minutes, 7 seconds on November 9, 1398, and the longest duration of totality was produced by member 42 at 3 minutes, 27 seconds on July 27, 1813. All eclipses in this series occur at the Moon’s ascending node of orbit.

Series members 42–63 occur between 1801 and 2200:
42	43	44
July 27, 1813	August 7, 1831	August 18, 1849
45	46	47
August 29, 1867	September 8, 1885	September 21, 1903
48	49	50
October 1, 1921	October 12, 1939	October 23, 1957
51	52	53
November 3, 1975	November 13, 1993	November 25, 2011
54	55	56
December 5, 2029	December 16, 2047	December 27, 2065
57	58	59
January 7, 2084	January 19, 2102	January 30, 2120
60	61	62
February 9, 2138	February 21, 2156	March 3, 2174
63
March 13, 2192

=== Metonic series ===
The metonic series repeats eclipses every 19 years (6939.69 days), lasting about 5 cycles. Eclipses occur in nearly the same calendar date. In addition, the octon subseries repeats 1/5 of that or every 3.8 years (1387.94 days). All eclipses in this table occur at the Moon's ascending node.

22 eclipse events between June 1, 2076 and October 27, 2163
June 1–3	March 21–22	January 7–8	October 26–27	August 14–15
119	121	123	125	127
June 1, 2076	March 21, 2080	January 7, 2084	October 26, 2087	August 15, 2091
129	131	133	135	137
June 2, 2095	March 21, 2099	January 8, 2103	October 26, 2106	August 15, 2110
139	141	143	145	147
June 3, 2114	March 22, 2118	January 8, 2122	October 26, 2125	August 15, 2129
149	151	153	155	157
June 3, 2133	March 21, 2137	January 8, 2141	October 26, 2144	August 14, 2148
159	161	163	165	
June 3, 2152			October 27, 2163	

=== Tritos series ===
This eclipse is a part of a tritos cycle, repeating at alternating nodes every 135 synodic months (≈ 3986.63 days, or 11 years minus 1 month). Their appearance and longitude are irregular due to a lack of synchronization with the anomalistic month (period of perigee), but groupings of 3 tritos cycles (≈ 33 years minus 3 months) come close (≈ 434.044 anomalistic months), so eclipses are similar in these groupings.

Series members between 2018 and 2200
July 13, 2018 (Saros 117)	June 12, 2029 (Saros 118)	May 11, 2040 (Saros 119)	April 11, 2051 (Saros 120)	March 11, 2062 (Saros 121)
February 7, 2073 (Saros 122)	January 7, 2084 (Saros 123)	December 7, 2094 (Saros 124)	November 6, 2105 (Saros 125)	October 6, 2116 (Saros 126)
September 6, 2127 (Saros 127)	August 5, 2138 (Saros 128)	July 5, 2149 (Saros 129)	June 4, 2160 (Saros 130)	May 5, 2171 (Saros 131)
April 3, 2182 (Saros 132)	March 3, 2193 (Saros 133)			

=== Inex series ===
This eclipse is a part of the long period inex cycle, repeating at alternating nodes, every 358 synodic months (≈ 10,571.95 days, or 29 years minus 20 days). Their appearance and longitude are irregular due to a lack of synchronization with the anomalistic month (period of perigee). However, groupings of 3 inex cycles (≈ 87 years minus 2 months) comes close (≈ 1,151.02 anomalistic months), so eclipses are similar in these groupings.

Series members between 1801 and 2200
July 8, 1823 (Saros 114)	June 17, 1852 (Saros 115)	May 27, 1881 (Saros 116)
May 9, 1910 (Saros 117)	April 19, 1939 (Saros 118)	March 28, 1968 (Saros 119)
March 9, 1997 (Saros 120)	February 17, 2026 (Saros 121)	January 27, 2055 (Saros 122)
January 7, 2084 (Saros 123)	December 19, 2112 (Saros 124)	November 28, 2141 (Saros 125)
November 8, 2170 (Saros 126)	October 19, 2199 (Saros 127)	
