= Solar eclipse of March 11, 2062 =

Future partial solar eclipse

- Partial eclipse
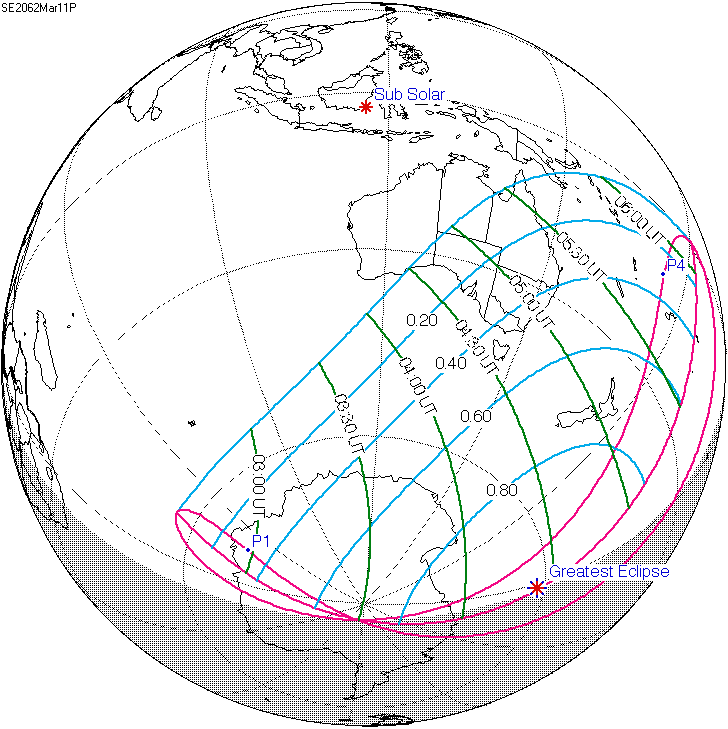
- Map
- Gamma: −1.0238
- Magnitude: 0.9331

Maximum eclipse
- Coordinates: 61°S 147.1°W

Times (UTC)
- Greatest eclipse: 4:26:16

References
- Saros: 121 (63 of 71)
- Catalog # (SE5000): 9646

A partial solar eclipse will occur at the Moon's ascending node of orbit on Saturday, March 11, 2062, with a magnitude of 0.9331. A solar eclipse occurs when the Moon passes between Earth and the Sun, thereby totally or partly obscuring the image of the Sun for a viewer on Earth. A partial solar eclipse occurs in the polar regions of the Earth when the center of the Moon's shadow misses the Earth.

The partial solar eclipse will be visible for much of Antarctica, Eastern Australia, New Zealand, and Oceania.

== Eclipse details ==
Shown below are two tables displaying details about this particular solar eclipse. The first table outlines times at which the Moon's penumbra or umbra attains the specific parameter, and the second table describes various other parameters pertaining to this eclipse.

March 11, 2062 Solar Eclipse Times
Event	Time (UTC)
First Penumbral External Contact	2062 March 11 at 02:14:37.0 UTC
Equatorial Conjunction	2062 March 11 at 03:22:56.6 UTC
Ecliptic Conjunction	2062 March 11 at 04:14:52.2 UTC
Greatest Eclipse	2062 March 11 at 04:26:16.2 UTC
Last Penumbral External Contact	2062 March 11 at 06:38:14.6 UTC

March 11, 2062 Solar Eclipse Parameters
Parameter	Value
Eclipse Magnitude	0.93309
Eclipse Obscuration	0.89604
Gamma	−1.02380
Sun Right Ascension	23h26m28.0s
Sun Declination	-03°36'57.3"
Sun Semi-Diameter	16'06.2"
Sun Equatorial Horizontal Parallax	08.9"
Moon Right Ascension	23h28m20.0s
Moon Declination	-04°27'39.9"
Moon Semi-Diameter	15'26.8"
Moon Equatorial Horizontal Parallax	0°56'41.5"
ΔT	91.9 s

== Eclipse season ==
This eclipse is part of an eclipse season, a period, roughly every six months, when eclipses occur. Only two (or occasionally three) eclipse seasons occur each year, and each season lasts about 35 days and repeats just short of six months (173 days) later; thus two full eclipse seasons always occur each year. Either two or three eclipses happen each eclipse season. In the sequence below, each eclipse is separated by a fortnight.

Eclipse season of March 2062
March 11 Ascending node (new moon)	March 25 Descending node (full moon)
Partial solar eclipse Solar Saros 121	Total lunar eclipse Lunar Saros 133

== Related eclipses ==
=== Eclipses in 2062 ===
- A partial solar eclipse on March 11.
- A total lunar eclipse on March 25.
- A partial solar eclipse on September 3.
- A total lunar eclipse on September 18.

=== Metonic ===
- Preceded by: Solar eclipse of May 22, 2058
- Followed by: Solar eclipse of December 27, 2065

=== Tzolkinex ===
- Preceded by: Solar eclipse of January 27, 2055
- Followed by: Solar eclipse of April 21, 2069

=== Half-Saros ===
- Preceded by: Lunar eclipse of March 4, 2053
- Followed by: Lunar eclipse of March 16, 2071

=== Tritos ===
- Preceded by: Solar eclipse of April 11, 2051
- Followed by: Solar eclipse of February 7, 2073

=== Solar Saros 121 ===
- Preceded by: Solar eclipse of February 28, 2044
- Followed by: Solar eclipse of March 21, 2080

=== Inex ===
- Preceded by: Solar eclipse of March 30, 2033
- Followed by: Solar eclipse of February 18, 2091

=== Triad ===
- Preceded by: Solar eclipse of May 11, 1975
- Followed by: Solar eclipse of January 9, 2149

=== Solar eclipses of 2062–2065 ===
This eclipse is a member of a semester series. An eclipse in a semester series of solar eclipses repeats approximately every 177 days and 4 hours (a semester) at alternating nodes of the Moon's orbit.

The partial solar eclipses on July 3, 2065 and December 27, 2065 occur in the next lunar year eclipse set.

Solar eclipse series sets from 2062 to 2065
Ascending node			Descending node		
Saros	Map	Gamma	Saros	Map	Gamma
121	March 11, 2062 Partial	−1.0238	126	September 3, 2062 Partial	1.0191
131	February 28, 2063 Annular	−0.336	136	August 24, 2063 Total	0.2771
141	February 17, 2064 Annular	0.3597	146	August 12, 2064 Total	−0.4652
151	February 5, 2065 Partial	1.0336	156	August 2, 2065 Partial	−1.2759

=== Saros 121 ===
This eclipse is a part of Saros series 121, repeating every 18 years, 11 days, and containing 71 events. The series started with a partial solar eclipse on April 25, 944 AD. It contains total eclipses from July 10, 1070 through October 9, 1809; hybrid eclipses on October 20, 1827 and October 30, 1845; and annular eclipses from November 11, 1863 through February 28, 2044. The series ends at member 71 as a partial eclipse on June 7, 2206. Its eclipses are tabulated in three columns; every third eclipse in the same column is one exeligmos apart, so they all cast shadows over approximately the same parts of the Earth.

The longest duration of totality was produced by member 39 at 6 minutes, 20 seconds on June 21, 1629, and the longest duration of annularity will be produced by member 62 at 2 minutes, 27 seconds on February 28, 2044. All eclipses in this series occur at the Moon’s ascending node of orbit.

Series members 49–70 occur between 1801 and 2200:
49	50	51
October 9, 1809	October 20, 1827	October 30, 1845
52	53	54
November 11, 1863	November 21, 1881	December 3, 1899
55	56	57
December 14, 1917	December 25, 1935	January 5, 1954
58	59	60
January 16, 1972	January 26, 1990	February 7, 2008
61	62	63
February 17, 2026	February 28, 2044	March 11, 2062
64	65	66
March 21, 2080	April 1, 2098	April 13, 2116
67	68	69
April 24, 2134	May 4, 2152	May 16, 2170
70
May 26, 2188

=== Metonic series ===
The metonic series repeats eclipses every 19 years (6939.69 days), lasting about 5 cycles. Eclipses occur in nearly the same calendar date. In addition, the octon subseries repeats 1/5 of that or every 3.8 years (1387.94 days). All eclipses in this table occur at the Moon's ascending node.

23 eclipse events between August 3, 2054 and October 16, 2145
August 3–4	May 22–24	March 10–11	December 27–29	October 14–16
117	119	121	123	125
August 3, 2054	May 22, 2058	March 11, 2062	December 27, 2065	October 15, 2069
127	129	131	133	135
August 3, 2073	May 22, 2077	March 10, 2081	December 27, 2084	October 14, 2088
137	139	141	143	145
August 3, 2092	May 22, 2096	March 10, 2100	December 29, 2103	October 16, 2107
147	149	151	153	155
August 4, 2111	May 24, 2115	March 11, 2119	December 28, 2122	October 16, 2126
157	159	161	163	165
August 4, 2130	May 23, 2134			October 16, 2145

=== Tritos series ===
This eclipse is a part of a tritos cycle, repeating at alternating nodes every 135 synodic months (≈ 3986.63 days, or 11 years minus 1 month). Their appearance and longitude are irregular due to a lack of synchronization with the anomalistic month (period of perigee), but groupings of 3 tritos cycles (≈ 33 years minus 3 months) come close (≈ 434.044 anomalistic months), so eclipses are similar in these groupings.

Series members between 2018 and 2200
July 13, 2018 (Saros 117)	June 12, 2029 (Saros 118)	May 11, 2040 (Saros 119)	April 11, 2051 (Saros 120)	March 11, 2062 (Saros 121)
February 7, 2073 (Saros 122)	January 7, 2084 (Saros 123)	December 7, 2094 (Saros 124)	November 6, 2105 (Saros 125)	October 6, 2116 (Saros 126)
September 6, 2127 (Saros 127)	August 5, 2138 (Saros 128)	July 5, 2149 (Saros 129)	June 4, 2160 (Saros 130)	May 5, 2171 (Saros 131)
April 3, 2182 (Saros 132)	March 3, 2193 (Saros 133)			

=== Inex series ===
This eclipse is a part of the long period inex cycle, repeating at alternating nodes, every 358 synodic months (≈ 10,571.95 days, or 29 years minus 20 days). Their appearance and longitude are irregular due to a lack of synchronization with the anomalistic month (period of perigee). However, groupings of 3 inex cycles (≈ 87 years minus 2 months) comes close (≈ 1,151.02 anomalistic months), so eclipses are similar in these groupings.

Series members between 1801 and 2200
September 8, 1801 (Saros 112)	August 18, 1830 (Saros 113)	July 29, 1859 (Saros 114)
July 9, 1888 (Saros 115)	June 19, 1917 (Saros 116)	May 30, 1946 (Saros 117)
May 11, 1975 (Saros 118)	April 19, 2004 (Saros 119)	March 30, 2033 (Saros 120)
March 11, 2062 (Saros 121)	February 18, 2091 (Saros 122)	January 30, 2120 (Saros 123)
January 9, 2149 (Saros 124)	December 20, 2177 (Saros 125)	
