= Solar eclipse of February 7, 2073 =

Future partial solar eclipse

- Partial eclipse
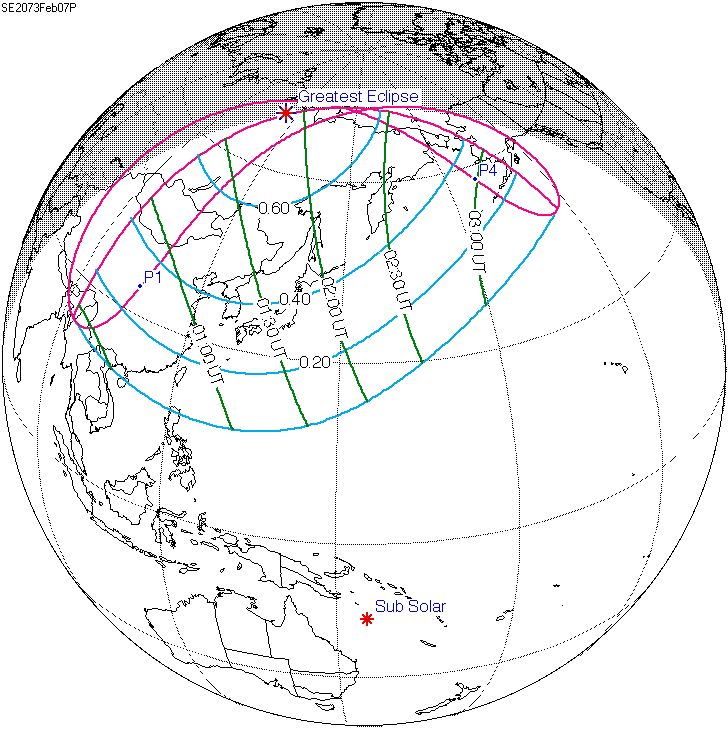
- Map
- Gamma: 1.1651
- Magnitude: 0.6768

Maximum eclipse
- Coordinates: 70.5°N 114.9°E

Times (UTC)
- Greatest eclipse: 1:55:59

References
- Saros: 122 (61 of 70)
- Catalog # (SE5000): 9671

A partial solar eclipse will occur at the Moon's descending node of orbit between Monday, February 6 and Tuesday, February 7, 2073, with a magnitude of 0.6768. A solar eclipse occurs when the Moon passes between Earth and the Sun, thereby totally or partly obscuring the image of the Sun for a viewer on Earth. A partial solar eclipse occurs in the polar regions of the Earth when the center of the Moon's shadow misses the Earth.

The partial solar eclipse will be visible for parts of East Asia, Northeast Asia, and western Alaska.

== Eclipse details ==
Shown below are two tables displaying details about this particular solar eclipse. The first table outlines times at which the Moon's penumbra or umbra attains the specific parameter, and the second table describes various other parameters pertaining to this eclipse.

February 7, 2073 Solar Eclipse Times
| Event | Time (UTC) |
|---|---|
| First Penumbral External Contact | 2073 February 06 at 23:52:47.2 UTC |
| Ecliptic Conjunction | 2073 February 07 at 01:42:33.9 UTC |
| Greatest Eclipse | 2073 February 07 at 01:55:59.0 UTC |
| Equatorial Conjunction | 2073 February 07 at 02:26:11.2 UTC |
| Last Penumbral External Contact | 2073 February 07 at 03:59:00.8 UTC |

February 7, 2073 Solar Eclipse Parameters
| Parameter | Value |
|---|---|
| Eclipse Magnitude | 0.67685 |
| Eclipse Obscuration | 0.57838 |
| Gamma | 1.16506 |
| Sun Right Ascension | 21h25m15.3s |
| Sun Declination | -15°09'16.6" |
| Sun Semi-Diameter | 16'13.0" |
| Sun Equatorial Horizontal Parallax | 08.9" |
| Moon Right Ascension | 21h24m18.6s |
| Moon Declination | -14°07'10.1" |
| Moon Semi-Diameter | 14'54.9" |
| Moon Equatorial Horizontal Parallax | 0°54'44.3" |
| ΔT | 99.9 s |

== Eclipse season ==
This eclipse is part of an eclipse season, a period, roughly every six months, when eclipses occur. Only two (or occasionally three) eclipse seasons occur each year, and each season lasts about 35 days and repeats just short of six months (173 days) later; thus two full eclipse seasons always occur each year. Either two or three eclipses happen each eclipse season. In the sequence below, each eclipse is separated by a fortnight.

Eclipse season of February 2073
| February 7 Descending node (new moon) | February 22 Ascending node (full moon) |
|---|---|
| Partial solar eclipse Solar Saros 122 | Total lunar eclipse Lunar Saros 134 |

== Related eclipses ==
=== Eclipses in 2073 ===
- A partial solar eclipse on February 7.
- A total lunar eclipse on February 22.
- A total solar eclipse on August 3.
- A total lunar eclipse on August 17.

=== Metonic ===
- Preceded by: Solar eclipse of April 21, 2069
- Followed by: Solar eclipse of November 26, 2076

=== Tzolkinex ===
- Preceded by: Solar eclipse of December 27, 2065
- Followed by: Solar eclipse of March 21, 2080

=== Half-Saros ===
- Preceded by: Lunar eclipse of February 2, 2064
- Followed by: Lunar eclipse of February 13, 2082

=== Tritos ===
- Preceded by: Solar eclipse of March 11, 2062
- Followed by: Solar eclipse of January 7, 2084

=== Solar Saros 122 ===
- Preceded by: Solar eclipse of January 27, 2055
- Followed by: Solar eclipse of February 18, 2091

=== Inex ===
- Preceded by: Solar eclipse of February 28, 2044
- Followed by: Solar eclipse of January 19, 2102

=== Triad ===
- Preceded by: Solar eclipse of April 9, 1986
- Followed by: Solar eclipse of December 9, 2159

=== Solar eclipses of 2073–2076 ===
This eclipse is a member of a semester series. An eclipse in a semester series of solar eclipses repeats approximately every 177 days and 4 hours (a semester) at alternating nodes of the Moon's orbit.

The partial solar eclipses on June 1, 2076 and November 26, 2076 occur in the next lunar year eclipse set.

Solar eclipse series sets from 2073 to 2076
| Descending node | | | Ascending node | | |
| Saros | Map | Gamma | Saros | Map | Gamma |
| 122 | February 7, 2073 Partial | 1.1651 | 127 | August 3, 2073 Total | −0.8763 |
| 132 | January 27, 2074 Annular | 0.4251 | 137 | July 24, 2074 Annular | −0.1242 |
| 142 | January 16, 2075 Total | −0.2799 | 147 | July 13, 2075 Annular | 0.6583 |
| 152 | January 6, 2076 Total | −0.9373 | 157 | July 1, 2076 Partial | 1.4005 |

=== Saros 122 ===
This eclipse is a part of Saros series 122, repeating every 18 years, 11 days, and containing 70 events. The series started with a partial solar eclipse on April 17, 991 AD. It contains total eclipses from July 12, 1135 through August 3, 1171; hybrid eclipses on August 13, 1189 and August 25, 1207; and annular eclipses from September 4, 1225 through October 10, 1874. The series ends at member 70 as a partial eclipse on May 17, 2235. Its eclipses are tabulated in three columns; every third eclipse in the same column is one exeligmos apart, so they all cast shadows over approximately the same parts of the Earth.

The longest duration of totality was produced by member 9 at 1 minutes, 25 seconds on July 12, 1135, and the longest duration of annularity was produced by member 50 at 6 minutes, 28 seconds on October 10, 1874. All eclipses in this series occur at the Moon’s descending node of orbit.

Series members 46–68 occur between 1801 and 2200:
| 46 | 47 | 48 |
|---|---|---|
| August 28, 1802 | September 7, 1820 | September 18, 1838 |
| 49 | 50 | 51 |
| September 29, 1856 | October 10, 1874 | October 20, 1892 |
| 52 | 53 | 54 |
| November 2, 1910 | November 12, 1928 | November 23, 1946 |
| 55 | 56 | 57 |
| December 4, 1964 | December 15, 1982 | December 25, 2000 |
| 58 | 59 | 60 |
| January 6, 2019 | January 16, 2037 | January 27, 2055 |
| 61 | 62 | 63 |
| February 7, 2073 | February 18, 2091 | March 1, 2109 |
| 64 | 65 | 66 |
| March 13, 2127 | March 23, 2145 | April 3, 2163 |
| 67 | 68 | |
| April 14, 2181 | April 25, 2199 | |

=== Metonic series ===
The metonic series repeats eclipses every 19 years (6939.69 days), lasting about 5 cycles. Eclipses occur in nearly the same calendar date. In addition, the octon subseries repeats 1/5 of that or every 3.8 years (1387.94 days). All eclipses in this table occur at the Moon's descending node.

22 eclipse events between July 3, 2065 and November 26, 2152
| July 3–4 | April 21–23 | February 7–8 | November 26–27 | September 13–15 |
| 118 | 120 | 122 | 124 | 126 |
|---|---|---|---|---|
| July 3, 2065 | April 21, 2069 | February 7, 2073 | November 26, 2076 | September 13, 2080 |
| 128 | 130 | 132 | 134 | 136 |
| July 3, 2084 | April 21, 2088 | February 7, 2092 | November 27, 2095 | September 14, 2099 |
| 138 | 140 | 142 | 144 | 146 |
| July 4, 2103 | April 23, 2107 | February 8, 2111 | November 27, 2114 | September 15, 2118 |
| 148 | 150 | 152 | 154 | 156 |
| July 4, 2122 | April 22, 2126 | February 8, 2130 | November 26, 2133 | September 15, 2137 |
| 158 | 160 | 162 | 164 | |
| July 3, 2141 | | | November 26, 2152 | |

=== Tritos series ===
This eclipse is a part of a tritos cycle, repeating at alternating nodes every 135 synodic months (≈ 3986.63 days, or 11 years minus 1 month). Their appearance and longitude are irregular due to a lack of synchronization with the anomalistic month (period of perigee), but groupings of 3 tritos cycles (≈ 33 years minus 3 months) come close (≈ 434.044 anomalistic months), so eclipses are similar in these groupings.

Series members between 2018 and 2200
| July 13, 2018 (Saros 117) | June 12, 2029 (Saros 118) | May 11, 2040 (Saros 119) | April 11, 2051 (Saros 120) | March 11, 2062 (Saros 121) |
| February 7, 2073 (Saros 122) | January 7, 2084 (Saros 123) | December 7, 2094 (Saros 124) | November 6, 2105 (Saros 125) | October 6, 2116 (Saros 126) |
| September 6, 2127 (Saros 127) | August 5, 2138 (Saros 128) | July 5, 2149 (Saros 129) | June 4, 2160 (Saros 130) | May 5, 2171 (Saros 131) |
| April 3, 2182 (Saros 132) | March 3, 2193 (Saros 133) | | | |

=== Inex series ===
This eclipse is a part of the long period inex cycle, repeating at alternating nodes, every 358 synodic months (≈ 10,571.95 days, or 29 years minus 20 days). Their appearance and longitude are irregular due to a lack of synchronization with the anomalistic month (period of perigee). However, groupings of 3 inex cycles (≈ 87 years minus 2 months) comes close (≈ 1,151.02 anomalistic months), so eclipses are similar in these groupings.

Series members between 1801 and 2200
| August 7, 1812 (Saros 113) | July 18, 1841 (Saros 114) | June 28, 1870 (Saros 115) |
| June 8, 1899 (Saros 116) | May 19, 1928 (Saros 117) | April 30, 1957 (Saros 118) |
| April 9, 1986 (Saros 119) | March 20, 2015 (Saros 120) | February 28, 2044 (Saros 121) |
| February 7, 2073 (Saros 122) | January 19, 2102 (Saros 123) | December 30, 2130 (Saros 124) |
| December 9, 2159 (Saros 125) | November 18, 2188 (Saros 126) | |
