= Solar eclipse of March 21, 2080 =

Future partial solar eclipse

- Partial eclipse
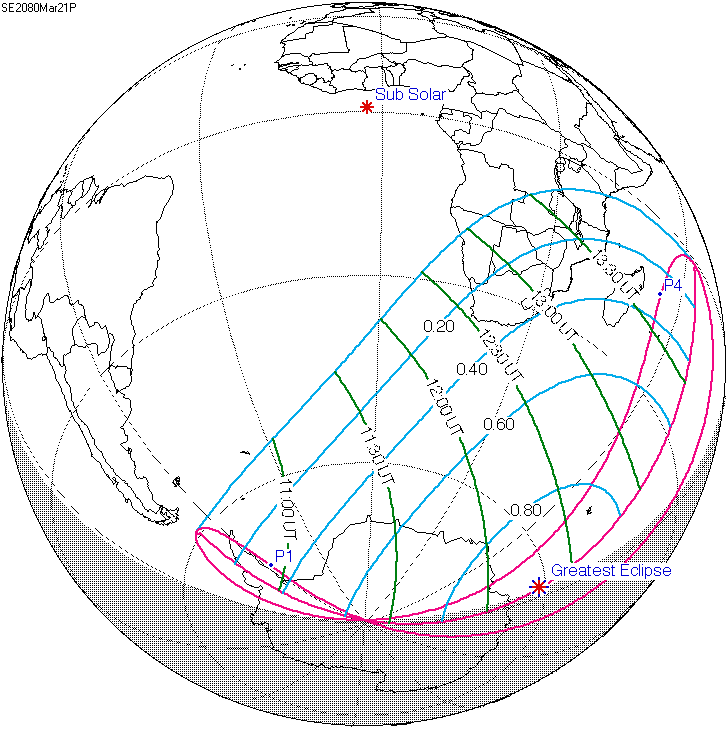
- Map
- Gamma: −1.0578
- Magnitude: 0.8734

Maximum eclipse
- Coordinates: 60.9°S 85.9°E

Times (UTC)
- Greatest eclipse: 12:20:15

References
- Saros: 121 (64 of 71)
- Catalog # (SE5000): 9687

A partial solar eclipse will occur at the Moon's ascending node of orbit on Thursday, March 21, 2080, with a magnitude of 0.8734. A solar eclipse occurs when the Moon passes between Earth and the Sun, thereby totally or partly obscuring the image of the Sun for a viewer on Earth. A partial solar eclipse occurs in the polar regions of the Earth when the center of the Moon's shadow misses the Earth.

The partial solar eclipse will be visible for parts of Antarctica and Southern Africa.

== Eclipse details ==
Shown below are two tables displaying details about this particular solar eclipse. The first table outlines times at which the Moon's penumbra or umbra attains the specific parameter, and the second table describes various other parameters pertaining to this eclipse.

March 21, 2080 Solar Eclipse Times
Event	Time (UTC)
First Penumbral External Contact	2080 March 21 at 10:11:39.8 UTC
Equatorial Conjunction	2080 March 21 at 11:13:57.1 UTC
Ecliptic Conjunction	2080 March 21 at 12:08:27.3 UTC
Greatest Eclipse	2080 March 21 at 12:20:15.4 UTC
Last Penumbral External Contact	2080 March 21 at 14:29:11.4 UTC

March 21, 2080 Solar Eclipse Parameters
Parameter	Value
Eclipse Magnitude	0.87343
Eclipse Obscuration	0.82517
Gamma	−1.05777
Sun Right Ascension	00h06m37.3s
Sun Declination	+00°43'02.5"
Sun Semi-Diameter	16'03.3"
Sun Equatorial Horizontal Parallax	08.8"
Moon Right Ascension	00h08m33.2s
Moon Declination	-00°09'04.7"
Moon Semi-Diameter	15'24.0"
Moon Equatorial Horizontal Parallax	0°56'31.2"
ΔT	105.6 s

== Eclipse season ==
This eclipse is part of an eclipse season, a period, roughly every six months, when eclipses occur. Only two (or occasionally three) eclipse seasons occur each year, and each season lasts about 35 days and repeats just short of six months (173 days) later; thus two full eclipse seasons always occur each year. Either two or three eclipses happen each eclipse season. In the sequence below, each eclipse is separated by a fortnight.

Eclipse season of March–April 2080
March 21 Ascending node (new moon)	April 4 Descending node (full moon)
Partial solar eclipse Solar Saros 121	Total lunar eclipse Lunar Saros 133

== Related eclipses ==
=== Eclipses in 2080 ===
- A partial solar eclipse on March 21.
- A total lunar eclipse on April 4.
- A partial solar eclipse on September 13.
- A total lunar eclipse on September 29.

=== Metonic ===
- Preceded by: Solar eclipse of June 1, 2076
- Followed by: Solar eclipse of January 7, 2084

=== Tzolkinex ===
- Preceded by: Solar eclipse of February 7, 2073
- Followed by: Solar eclipse of May 2, 2087

=== Half-Saros ===
- Preceded by: Lunar eclipse of March 16, 2071
- Followed by: Lunar eclipse of March 26, 2089

=== Tritos ===
- Preceded by: Solar eclipse of April 21, 2069
- Followed by: Solar eclipse of February 18, 2091

=== Solar Saros 121 ===
- Preceded by: Solar eclipse of March 11, 2062
- Followed by: Solar eclipse of April 1, 2098

=== Inex ===
- Preceded by: Solar eclipse of April 11, 2051
- Followed by: Solar eclipse of March 1, 2109

=== Triad ===
- Preceded by: Solar eclipse of May 21, 1993
- Followed by: Solar eclipse of January 21, 2167

=== Solar eclipses of 2080–2083 ===
This eclipse is a member of a semester series. An eclipse in a semester series of solar eclipses repeats approximately every 177 days and 4 hours (a semester) at alternating nodes of the Moon's orbit.

The partial solar eclipse on July 15, 2083 occurs in the next lunar year eclipse set.

Solar eclipse series sets from 2080 to 2083
Ascending node			Descending node		
Saros	Map	Gamma	Saros	Map	Gamma
121	March 21, 2080 Partial	−1.0578	126	September 13, 2080 Partial	1.0723
131	March 10, 2081 Annular	−0.3653	136	September 3, 2081 Total	0.3378
141	February 27, 2082 Annular	0.3361	146	August 24, 2082 Total	−0.4004
151	February 16, 2083 Partial	1.017	156	August 13, 2083 Partial	−1.2064

=== Saros 121 ===
This eclipse is a part of Saros series 121, repeating every 18 years, 11 days, and containing 71 events. The series started with a partial solar eclipse on April 25, 944 AD. It contains total eclipses from July 10, 1070 through October 9, 1809; hybrid eclipses on October 20, 1827 and October 30, 1845; and annular eclipses from November 11, 1863 through February 28, 2044. The series ends at member 71 as a partial eclipse on June 7, 2206. Its eclipses are tabulated in three columns; every third eclipse in the same column is one exeligmos apart, so they all cast shadows over approximately the same parts of the Earth.

The longest duration of totality was produced by member 39 at 6 minutes, 20 seconds on June 21, 1629, and the longest duration of annularity will be produced by member 62 at 2 minutes, 27 seconds on February 28, 2044. All eclipses in this series occur at the Moon’s ascending node of orbit.

Series members 49–70 occur between 1801 and 2200:
49	50	51
October 9, 1809	October 20, 1827	October 30, 1845
52	53	54
November 11, 1863	November 21, 1881	December 3, 1899
55	56	57
December 14, 1917	December 25, 1935	January 5, 1954
58	59	60
January 16, 1972	January 26, 1990	February 7, 2008
61	62	63
February 17, 2026	February 28, 2044	March 11, 2062
64	65	66
March 21, 2080	April 1, 2098	April 13, 2116
67	68	69
April 24, 2134	May 4, 2152	May 16, 2170
70
May 26, 2188

=== Metonic series ===
The metonic series repeats eclipses every 19 years (6939.69 days), lasting about 5 cycles. Eclipses occur in nearly the same calendar date. In addition, the octon subseries repeats 1/5 of that or every 3.8 years (1387.94 days). All eclipses in this table occur at the Moon's ascending node.

22 eclipse events between June 1, 2076 and October 27, 2163
June 1–3	March 21–22	January 7–8	October 26–27	August 14–15
119	121	123	125	127
June 1, 2076	March 21, 2080	January 7, 2084	October 26, 2087	August 15, 2091
129	131	133	135	137
June 2, 2095	March 21, 2099	January 8, 2103	October 26, 2106	August 15, 2110
139	141	143	145	147
June 3, 2114	March 22, 2118	January 8, 2122	October 26, 2125	August 15, 2129
149	151	153	155	157
June 3, 2133	March 21, 2137	January 8, 2141	October 26, 2144	August 14, 2148
159	161	163	165	
June 3, 2152			October 27, 2163	

=== Tritos series ===
This eclipse is a part of a tritos cycle, repeating at alternating nodes every 135 synodic months (≈ 3986.63 days, or 11 years minus 1 month). Their appearance and longitude are irregular due to a lack of synchronization with the anomalistic month (period of perigee), but groupings of 3 tritos cycles (≈ 33 years minus 3 months) come close (≈ 434.044 anomalistic months), so eclipses are similar in these groupings.

Series members between 2036 and 2200
July 23, 2036 (Saros 117)	June 23, 2047 (Saros 118)	May 22, 2058 (Saros 119)	April 21, 2069 (Saros 120)	March 21, 2080 (Saros 121)
February 18, 2091 (Saros 122)	January 19, 2102 (Saros 123)	December 19, 2112 (Saros 124)	November 18, 2123 (Saros 125)	October 17, 2134 (Saros 126)
September 16, 2145 (Saros 127)	August 16, 2156 (Saros 128)	July 16, 2167 (Saros 129)	June 16, 2178 (Saros 130)	May 15, 2189 (Saros 131)
April 14, 2200 (Saros 132)

=== Inex series ===
This eclipse is a part of the long period inex cycle, repeating at alternating nodes, every 358 synodic months (≈ 10,571.95 days, or 29 years minus 20 days). Their appearance and longitude are irregular due to a lack of synchronization with the anomalistic month (period of perigee). However, groupings of 3 inex cycles (≈ 87 years minus 2 months) comes close (≈ 1,151.02 anomalistic months), so eclipses are similar in these groupings.

Series members between 1801 and 2200
September 19, 1819 (Saros 112)	August 28, 1848 (Saros 113)	August 9, 1877 (Saros 114)
July 21, 1906 (Saros 115)	June 30, 1935 (Saros 116)	June 10, 1964 (Saros 117)
May 21, 1993 (Saros 118)	April 30, 2022 (Saros 119)	April 11, 2051 (Saros 120)
March 21, 2080 (Saros 121)	March 1, 2109 (Saros 122)	February 9, 2138 (Saros 123)
January 21, 2167 (Saros 124)	December 31, 2195 (Saros 125)	
