= Solar eclipse of September 13, 2080 =

Future partial solar eclipse

- Partial eclipse
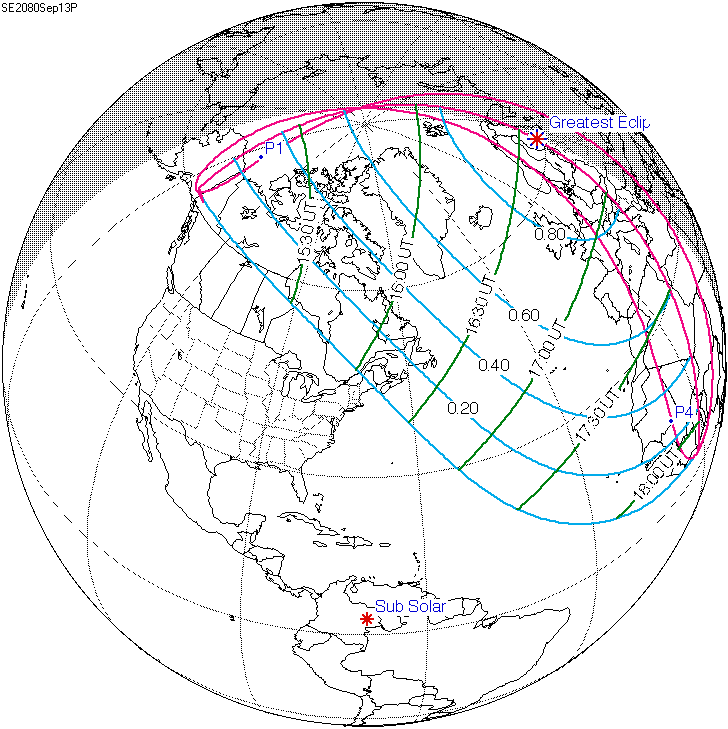
- Map
- Gamma: 1.0723
- Magnitude: 0.8743

Maximum eclipse
- Coordinates: 61.1°N 25.8°E

Times (UTC)
- Greatest eclipse: 16:38:09

References
- Saros: 126 (51 of 72)
- Catalog # (SE5000): 9688

A partial solar eclipse will occur at the Moon's descending node of orbit on Friday, September 13, 2080, with a magnitude of 0.8743. A solar eclipse occurs when the Moon passes between Earth and the Sun, thereby totally or partly obscuring the image of the Sun for a viewer on Earth. A partial solar eclipse occurs in the polar regions of the Earth when the center of the Moon's shadow misses the Earth.

The partial solar eclipse will be visible for parts of northern North America, Europe, West Africa, and North Africa.

== Eclipse details ==
Shown below are two tables displaying details about this particular solar eclipse. The first table outlines times at which the Moon's penumbra or umbra attains the specific parameter, and the second table describes various other parameters pertaining to this eclipse.

September 13, 2080 Solar Eclipse Times
Event	Time (UTC)
First Penumbral External Contact	2080 September 13 at 14:42:59.9 UTC
Equatorial Conjunction	2080 September 13 at 15:36:33.0 UTC
Ecliptic Conjunction	2080 September 13 at 16:27:19.9 UTC
Greatest Eclipse	2080 September 13 at 16:38:09.2 UTC
Last Penumbral External Contact	2080 September 13 at 18:33:46.9 UTC

September 13, 2080 Solar Eclipse Parameters
Parameter	Value
Eclipse Magnitude	0.87434
Eclipse Obscuration	0.84863
Gamma	1.07235
Sun Right Ascension	11h29m55.2s
Sun Declination	+03°14'46.9"
Sun Semi-Diameter	15'53.7"
Sun Equatorial Horizontal Parallax	08.7"
Moon Right Ascension	11h31m59.3s
Moon Declination	+04°11'17.0"
Moon Semi-Diameter	16'24.7"
Moon Equatorial Horizontal Parallax	1°00'13.7"
ΔT	106.0 s

== Eclipse season ==
This eclipse is part of an eclipse season, a period, roughly every six months, when eclipses occur. Only two (or occasionally three) eclipse seasons occur each year, and each season lasts about 35 days and repeats just short of six months (173 days) later; thus two full eclipse seasons always occur each year. Either two or three eclipses happen each eclipse season. In the sequence below, each eclipse is separated by a fortnight.

Eclipse season of September 2080
September 13 Descending node (new moon)	September 29 Ascending node (full moon)
Partial solar eclipse Solar Saros 126	Total lunar eclipse Lunar Saros 138

== Related eclipses ==
=== Eclipses in 2080 ===
- A partial solar eclipse on March 21.
- A total lunar eclipse on April 4.
- A partial solar eclipse on September 13.
- A total lunar eclipse on September 29.

=== Metonic ===
- Preceded by: Solar eclipse of November 26, 2076
- Followed by: Solar eclipse of July 3, 2084

=== Tzolkinex ===
- Preceded by: Solar eclipse of August 3, 2073
- Followed by: Solar eclipse of October 26, 2087

=== Half-Saros ===
- Preceded by: Lunar eclipse of September 9, 2071
- Followed by: Lunar eclipse of September 19, 2089

=== Tritos ===
- Preceded by: Solar eclipse of October 15, 2069
- Followed by: Solar eclipse of August 15, 2091

=== Solar Saros 126 ===
- Preceded by: Solar eclipse of September 3, 2062
- Followed by: Solar eclipse of September 25, 2098

=== Inex ===
- Preceded by: Solar eclipse of October 4, 2051
- Followed by: Solar eclipse of August 26, 2109

=== Triad ===
- Preceded by: Solar eclipse of November 13, 1993
- Followed by: Solar eclipse of July 16, 2167

=== Solar eclipses of 2080–2083 ===
This eclipse is a member of a semester series. An eclipse in a semester series of solar eclipses repeats approximately every 177 days and 4 hours (a semester) at alternating nodes of the Moon's orbit.

The partial solar eclipse on July 15, 2083 occurs in the next lunar year eclipse set.

Solar eclipse series sets from 2080 to 2083
Ascending node			Descending node		
Saros	Map	Gamma	Saros	Map	Gamma
121	March 21, 2080 Partial	−1.0578	126	September 13, 2080 Partial	1.0723
131	March 10, 2081 Annular	−0.3653	136	September 3, 2081 Total	0.3378
141	February 27, 2082 Annular	0.3361	146	August 24, 2082 Total	−0.4004
151	February 16, 2083 Partial	1.017	156	August 13, 2083 Partial	−1.2064

=== Saros 126 ===
This eclipse is a part of Saros series 126, repeating every 18 years, 11 days, and containing 72 events. The series started with a partial solar eclipse on March 10, 1179. It contains annular eclipses from June 4, 1323 through April 4, 1810; hybrid eclipses from April 14, 1828 through May 6, 1864; and total eclipses from May 17, 1882 through August 23, 2044. The series ends at member 72 as a partial eclipse on May 3, 2459. Its eclipses are tabulated in three columns; every third eclipse in the same column is one exeligmos apart, so they all cast shadows over approximately the same parts of the Earth.

The longest duration of annularity was produced by member 11 at 6 minutes, 30 seconds on June 26, 1359, and the longest duration of totality was produced by member 45 at 2 minutes, 36 seconds on July 10, 1972. All eclipses in this series occur at the Moon’s descending node of orbit.

Series members 36–57 occur between 1801 and 2200:
36	37	38
April 4, 1810	April 14, 1828	April 25, 1846
39	40	41
May 6, 1864	May 17, 1882	May 28, 1900
42	43	44
June 8, 1918	June 19, 1936	June 30, 1954
45	46	47
July 10, 1972	July 22, 1990	August 1, 2008
48	49	50
August 12, 2026	August 23, 2044	September 3, 2062
51	52	53
September 13, 2080	September 25, 2098	October 6, 2116
54	55	56
October 17, 2134	October 28, 2152	November 8, 2170
57
November 18, 2188

=== Metonic series ===
The metonic series repeats eclipses every 19 years (6939.69 days), lasting about 5 cycles. Eclipses occur in nearly the same calendar date. In addition, the octon subseries repeats 1/5 of that or every 3.8 years (1387.94 days). All eclipses in this table occur at the Moon's descending node.

22 eclipse events between July 3, 2065 and November 26, 2152
July 3–4	April 21–23	February 7–8	November 26–27	September 13–15
118	120	122	124	126
July 3, 2065	April 21, 2069	February 7, 2073	November 26, 2076	September 13, 2080
128	130	132	134	136
July 3, 2084	April 21, 2088	February 7, 2092	November 27, 2095	September 14, 2099
138	140	142	144	146
July 4, 2103	April 23, 2107	February 8, 2111	November 27, 2114	September 15, 2118
148	150	152	154	156
July 4, 2122	April 22, 2126	February 8, 2130	November 26, 2133	September 15, 2137
158	160	162	164	
July 3, 2141			November 26, 2152	

=== Tritos series ===
This eclipse is a part of a tritos cycle, repeating at alternating nodes every 135 synodic months (≈ 3986.63 days, or 11 years minus 1 month). Their appearance and longitude are irregular due to a lack of synchronization with the anomalistic month (period of perigee), but groupings of 3 tritos cycles (≈ 33 years minus 3 months) come close (≈ 434.044 anomalistic months), so eclipses are similar in these groupings.

The partial solar eclipses on March 27, 1884 (part of Saros 108) and December 24, 1916 (part of Saros 111) are also a part of this series but are not included in the table below.

Series members between 1971 and 2200
July 22, 1971 (Saros 116)	June 21, 1982 (Saros 117)	May 21, 1993 (Saros 118)	April 19, 2004 (Saros 119)	March 20, 2015 (Saros 120)
February 17, 2026 (Saros 121)	January 16, 2037 (Saros 122)	December 16, 2047 (Saros 123)	November 16, 2058 (Saros 124)	October 15, 2069 (Saros 125)
September 13, 2080 (Saros 126)	August 15, 2091 (Saros 127)	July 15, 2102 (Saros 128)	June 13, 2113 (Saros 129)	May 14, 2124 (Saros 130)
April 13, 2135 (Saros 131)	March 12, 2146 (Saros 132)	February 9, 2157 (Saros 133)	January 10, 2168 (Saros 134)	December 9, 2178 (Saros 135)
November 8, 2189 (Saros 136)	October 9, 2200 (Saros 137)			

=== Inex series ===
This eclipse is a part of the long period inex cycle, repeating at alternating nodes, every 358 synodic months (≈ 10,571.95 days, or 29 years minus 20 days). Their appearance and longitude are irregular due to a lack of synchronization with the anomalistic month (period of perigee). However, groupings of 3 inex cycles (≈ 87 years minus 2 months) comes close (≈ 1,151.02 anomalistic months), so eclipses are similar in these groupings.

Series members between 1801 and 2200
March 14, 1820 (Saros 117)	February 23, 1849 (Saros 118)	February 2, 1878 (Saros 119)
January 14, 1907 (Saros 120)	December 25, 1935 (Saros 121)	December 4, 1964 (Saros 122)
November 13, 1993 (Saros 123)	October 25, 2022 (Saros 124)	October 4, 2051 (Saros 125)
September 13, 2080 (Saros 126)	August 26, 2109 (Saros 127)	August 5, 2138 (Saros 128)
July 16, 2167 (Saros 129)	June 26, 2196 (Saros 130)	
