= Solar eclipse of September 7, 1820 =

Annular Solar eclipse September 7, 1820

- Annular eclipse
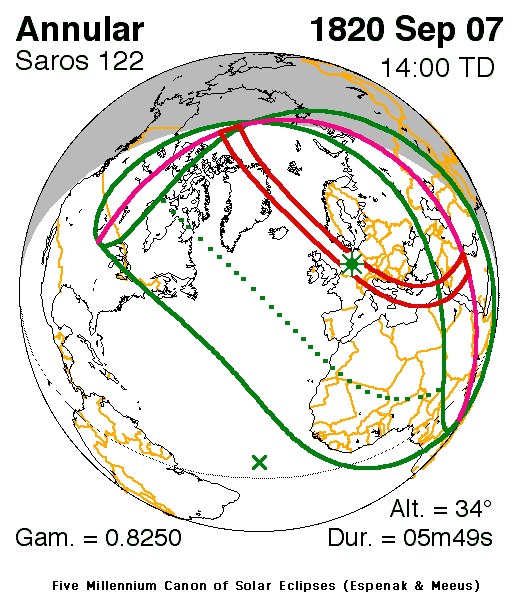
- Map
- Gamma: 0.8251
- Magnitude: 0.9329

Maximum eclipse
- Duration: 349 s (5 min 49 s)
- Coordinates: 51.6°N 8.7°E
- Max. width of band: 432 km (268 mi)

Times (UTC)
- Greatest eclipse: 13:59:58

References
- Saros: 122 (47 of 70)
- Catalog # (SE5000): 9091

An annular solar eclipse occurred at the Moon's descending node of orbit on Thursday, September 7, 1820, with a magnitude of 0.9329. A solar eclipse occurs when the Moon passes between Earth and the Sun, thereby totally or partly obscuring the image of the Sun for a viewer on Earth. An annular solar eclipse occurs when the Moon's apparent diameter is smaller than the Sun's, blocking most of the Sun's light and causing the Sun to look like an annulus (ring). An annular eclipse appears as a partial eclipse over a region of the Earth thousands of kilometres wide. Occurring only about 5 hours before apogee (on September 7, 1820, at 18:50 UTC), the Moon's apparent diameter was smaller.

The path of annularity was visible from parts of modern-day northern Canada, Greenland, western Norway, Denmark, the Netherlands, Germany, Switzerland, the Czech Republic, Austria, Italy, Slovenia, Croatia, Bosnia and Herzegovina, Montenegro, Albania, Greece, northeastern Libya, Egypt, Israel, Jordan, and Saudi Arabia. A partial solar eclipse was also visible for parts of northern North America, Europe, North Africa, the Middle East, and Central Asia.

== Observation and prediction ==
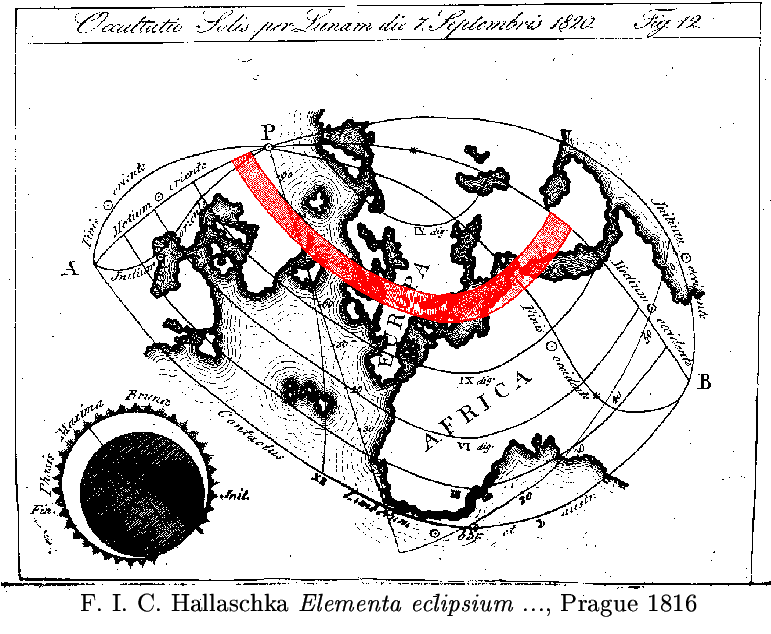

This map was drawn in the book Elementa eclipsium, published in Prague in 1816, by Franz Ignaz Cassian Hallaschka (František Ignác Kassián Halaška) (1780-1847), which held other maps of solar eclipse paths from 1816 and 1860.

== Eclipse details ==
Shown below are two tables displaying details about this particular solar eclipse. The first table outlines times at which the Moon's penumbra or umbra attains the specific parameter, and the second table describes various other parameters pertaining to this eclipse.

September 7, 1820 Solar Eclipse Times
Event	Time (UTC)
First Penumbral External Contact	1820 September 7 at 11:21:45.1 UTC
First Umbral External Contact	1820 September 7 at 12:48:53.2 UTC
First Central Line	1820 September 7 at 12:53:29.4 UTC
First Umbral Internal Contact	1820 September 7 at 12:58:19.3 UTC
Equatorial Conjunction	1820 September 7 at 13:06:52.6 UTC
Ecliptic Conjunction	1820 September 7 at 13:50:09.9 UTC
Greatest Duration	1820 September 7 at 13:57:39.4 UTC
Greatest Eclipse	1820 September 7 at 13:59:57.6 UTC
Last Umbral Internal Contact	1820 September 7 at 15:02:09.4 UTC
Last Central Line	1820 September 7 at 15:06:58.7 UTC
Last Umbral External Contact	1820 September 7 at 15:11:34.3 UTC
Last Penumbral External Contact	1820 September 7 at 16:38:31.5 UTC

September 7, 1820 Solar Eclipse Parameters
Parameter	Value
Eclipse Magnitude	0.93295
Eclipse Obscuration	0.87040
Gamma	0.82506
Sun Right Ascension	11h04m02.1s
Sun Declination	+05°59'29.3"
Sun Semi-Diameter	15'53.0"
Sun Equatorial Horizontal Parallax	08.7"
Moon Right Ascension	11h05m27.2s
Moon Declination	+06°38'30.8"
Moon Semi-Diameter	14'41.9"
Moon Equatorial Horizontal Parallax	0°53'56.6"
ΔT	11.4 s

== Eclipse season ==
This eclipse is part of an eclipse season, a period, roughly every six months, when eclipses occur. Only two (or occasionally three) eclipse seasons occur each year, and each season lasts about 35 days and repeats just short of six months (173 days) later; thus two full eclipse seasons always occur each year. Either two or three eclipses happen each eclipse season. In the sequence below, each eclipse is separated by a fortnight.

Eclipse season of September 1820
September 7 Descending node (new moon)	September 22 Ascending node (full moon)
Annular solar eclipse Solar Saros 122	Partial lunar eclipse Lunar Saros 134

== Related eclipses ==
=== Eclipses in 1820 ===
- A total solar eclipse on March 14.
- A partial lunar eclipse on March 29.
- An annular solar eclipse on September 7.
- A partial lunar eclipse on September 22.

=== Metonic ===
- Preceded by: Solar eclipse of November 19, 1816
- Followed by: Solar eclipse of June 26, 1824

=== Tzolkinex ===
- Preceded by: Solar eclipse of July 27, 1813
- Followed by: Solar eclipse of October 20, 1827

=== Half-Saros ===
- Preceded by: Lunar eclipse of September 2, 1811
- Followed by: Lunar eclipse of September 13, 1829

=== Tritos ===
- Preceded by: Solar eclipse of October 9, 1809
- Followed by: Solar eclipse of August 7, 1831

=== Solar Saros 122 ===
- Preceded by: Solar eclipse of August 28, 1802
- Followed by: Solar eclipse of September 18, 1838

=== Inex ===
- Preceded by: Solar eclipse of September 27, 1791
- Followed by: Solar eclipse of August 18, 1849

=== Triad ===
- Preceded by: Solar eclipse of November 6, 1733
- Followed by: Solar eclipse of July 10, 1907

=== Solar eclipses of 1819–1823 ===
This eclipse is a member of a semester series. An eclipse in a semester series of solar eclipses repeats approximately every 177 days and 4 hours (a semester) at alternating nodes of the Moon's orbit.

The partial solar eclipses on April 24, 1819 and October 19, 1819 occur in the previous lunar year eclipse set, and the partial solar eclipses on January 12, 1823 and July 8, 1823 occur in the next lunar year eclipse set.

Solar eclipse series sets from 1819 to 1823
Ascending node			Descending node		
Saros	Map	Gamma	Saros	Map	Gamma
107	March 25, 1819 Partial	−1.4722	112	September 19, 1819 Partial	1.5258
117	March 14, 1820 Total	−0.7199	122	September 7, 1820 Annular	0.8251
127	March 4, 1821 Total	−0.0284	132	August 27, 1821 Annular	0.0671
137	February 21, 1822 Annular	0.6914	142	August 16, 1822 Total	−0.6904
147	February 11, 1823 Partial	−1.5413	152	August 6, 1823 Partial	1.4546

=== Saros 122 ===
This eclipse is a part of Saros series 122, repeating every 18 years, 11 days, and containing 70 events. The series started with a partial solar eclipse on April 17, 991 AD. It contains total eclipses from July 12, 1135 through August 3, 1171; hybrid eclipses on August 13, 1189 and August 25, 1207; and annular eclipses from September 4, 1225 through October 10, 1874. The series ends at member 70 as a partial eclipse on May 17, 2235. Its eclipses are tabulated in three columns; every third eclipse in the same column is one exeligmos apart, so they all cast shadows over approximately the same parts of the Earth.

The longest duration of totality was produced by member 9 at 1 minutes, 25 seconds on July 12, 1135, and the longest duration of annularity was produced by member 50 at 6 minutes, 28 seconds on October 10, 1874. All eclipses in this series occur at the Moon’s descending node of orbit.

Series members 46–68 occur between 1801 and 2200:
46	47	48
August 28, 1802	September 7, 1820	September 18, 1838
49	50	51
September 29, 1856	October 10, 1874	October 20, 1892
52	53	54
November 2, 1910	November 12, 1928	November 23, 1946
55	56	57
December 4, 1964	December 15, 1982	December 25, 2000
58	59	60
January 6, 2019	January 16, 2037	January 27, 2055
61	62	63
February 7, 2073	February 18, 2091	March 1, 2109
64	65	66
March 13, 2127	March 23, 2145	April 3, 2163
67	68	
April 14, 2181	April 25, 2199	

=== Metonic series ===
The metonic series repeats eclipses every 19 years (6939.69 days), lasting about 5 cycles. Eclipses occur in nearly the same calendar date. In addition, the octon subseries repeats 1/5 of that or every 3.8 years (1387.94 days). All eclipses in this table occur at the Moon's descending node.

22 eclipse events between September 8, 1801 and September 7, 1877
September 7–8	June 26–27	April 14–15	January 31–February 1	November 19–20
112	114	116	118	120
September 8, 1801	June 26, 1805	April 14, 1809	February 1, 1813	November 19, 1816
122	124	126	128	130
September 7, 1820	June 26, 1824	April 14, 1828	February 1, 1832	November 20, 1835
132	134	136	138	140
September 7, 1839	June 27, 1843	April 15, 1847	February 1, 1851	November 20, 1854
142	144	146	148	150
September 7, 1858	June 27, 1862	April 15, 1866	January 31, 1870	November 20, 1873
152
September 7, 1877

=== Tritos series ===
This eclipse is a part of a tritos cycle, repeating at alternating nodes every 135 synodic months (≈ 3986.63 days, or 11 years minus 1 month). Their appearance and longitude are irregular due to a lack of synchronization with the anomalistic month (period of perigee), but groupings of 3 tritos cycles (≈ 33 years minus 3 months) come close (≈ 434.044 anomalistic months), so eclipses are similar in these groupings.

Series members between 1801 and 2200
October 9, 1809 (Saros 121)	September 7, 1820 (Saros 122)	August 7, 1831 (Saros 123)	July 8, 1842 (Saros 124)	June 6, 1853 (Saros 125)
May 6, 1864 (Saros 126)	April 6, 1875 (Saros 127)	March 5, 1886 (Saros 128)	February 1, 1897 (Saros 129)	January 3, 1908 (Saros 130)
December 3, 1918 (Saros 131)	November 1, 1929 (Saros 132)	October 1, 1940 (Saros 133)	September 1, 1951 (Saros 134)	July 31, 1962 (Saros 135)
June 30, 1973 (Saros 136)	May 30, 1984 (Saros 137)	April 29, 1995 (Saros 138)	March 29, 2006 (Saros 139)	February 26, 2017 (Saros 140)
January 26, 2028 (Saros 141)	December 26, 2038 (Saros 142)	November 25, 2049 (Saros 143)	October 24, 2060 (Saros 144)	September 23, 2071 (Saros 145)
August 24, 2082 (Saros 146)	July 23, 2093 (Saros 147)	June 22, 2104 (Saros 148)	May 24, 2115 (Saros 149)	April 22, 2126 (Saros 150)
March 21, 2137 (Saros 151)	February 19, 2148 (Saros 152)	January 19, 2159 (Saros 153)	December 18, 2169 (Saros 154)	November 17, 2180 (Saros 155)
October 18, 2191 (Saros 156)

=== Inex series ===
This eclipse is a part of the long period inex cycle, repeating at alternating nodes, every 358 synodic months (≈ 10,571.95 days, or 29 years minus 20 days). Their appearance and longitude are irregular due to a lack of synchronization with the anomalistic month (period of perigee). However, groupings of 3 inex cycles (≈ 87 years minus 2 months) comes close (≈ 1,151.02 anomalistic months), so eclipses are similar in these groupings.

Series members between 1801 and 2200
September 7, 1820 (Saros 122)	August 18, 1849 (Saros 123)	July 29, 1878 (Saros 124)
July 10, 1907 (Saros 125)	June 19, 1936 (Saros 126)	May 30, 1965 (Saros 127)
May 10, 1994 (Saros 128)	April 20, 2023 (Saros 129)	March 30, 2052 (Saros 130)
March 10, 2081 (Saros 131)	February 18, 2110 (Saros 132)	January 30, 2139 (Saros 133)
January 10, 2168 (Saros 134)	December 19, 2196 (Saros 135)	
