= Solar eclipse of October 24, 2098 =

Future partial solar eclipse

- Partial eclipse
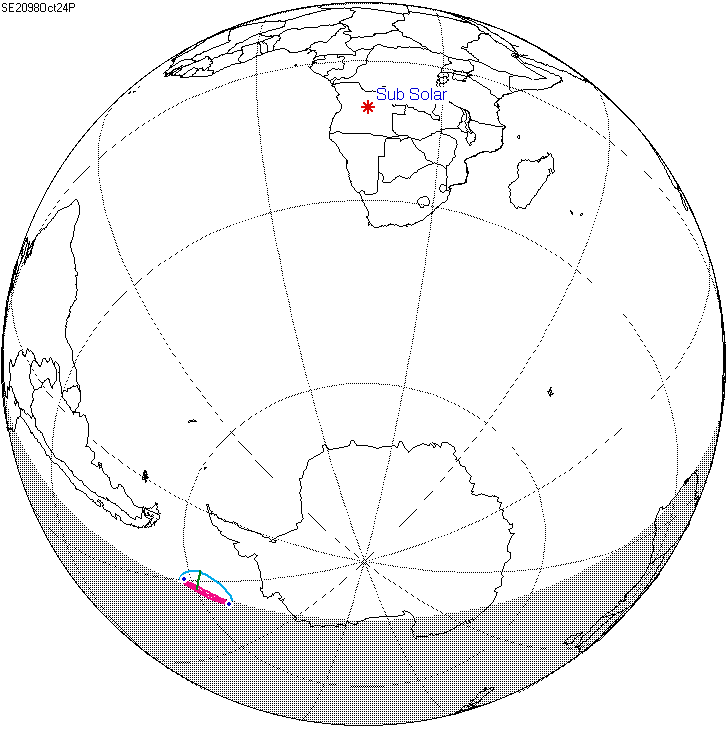
- Map
- Gamma: −1.5407
- Magnitude: 0.0056

Maximum eclipse
- Coordinates: 61.8°S 95.5°W

Times (UTC)
- Greatest eclipse: 10:36:11

References
- Saros: 164 (1 of 80)
- Catalog # (SE5000): 9730

A partial solar eclipse will occur at the Moon's descending node of orbit on Friday, October 24, 2098, with a magnitude of 0.0056. A solar eclipse occurs when the Moon passes between Earth and the Sun, thereby totally or partly obscuring the image of the Sun for a viewer on Earth. A partial solar eclipse occurs in the polar regions of the Earth when the center of the Moon's shadow misses the Earth.

This minor eclipse is the first solar eclipse of Saros cycle 164. It is the shallowest solar eclipse of the 21st century; at best, in a remote location within the Southern Ocean the moon will block out 0.56% of the sun's diameter with the sun barely above the horizon. Gamma is equal to −1.5407, which is also farther from zero than any other solar eclipse in the century. The eclipse is not listed by some sources. There will not be a shallower partial eclipse until August 23, 2883.

== Eclipse details ==
Shown below are two tables displaying details about this particular solar eclipse. The first table outlines times at which the Moon's penumbra or umbra attains the specific parameter, and the second table describes various other parameters pertaining to this eclipse.

October 24, 2098 Solar Eclipse Times
Event	Time (UTC)
First Penumbral External Contact	2098 October 24 at 10:25:24.3 UTC
Greatest Eclipse	2098 October 24 at 10:36:10.8 UTC
Last Penumbral External Contact	2098 October 24 at 10:46:29.2 UTC
Ecliptic Conjunction	2098 October 24 at 10:52:05.9 UTC
Equatorial Conjunction	2098 October 24 at 11:56:02.8 UTC

October 24, 2098 Solar Eclipse Parameters
Parameter	Value
Eclipse Magnitude	0.00568
Eclipse Obscuration	0.00051
Gamma	−1.54072
Sun Right Ascension	13h57m42.1s
Sun Declination	-12°01'06.6"
Sun Semi-Diameter	16'04.5"
Sun Equatorial Horizontal Parallax	08.8"
Moon Right Ascension	13h55m00.2s
Moon Declination	-13°22'41.3"
Moon Semi-Diameter	16'04.0"
Moon Equatorial Horizontal Parallax	0°58'57.8"
ΔT	122.4 s

== Eclipse season ==
This eclipse is part of an eclipse season, a period, roughly every six months, when eclipses occur. Only two (or occasionally three) eclipse seasons occur each year, and each season lasts about 35 days and repeats just short of six months (173 days) later; thus two full eclipse seasons always occur each year. Either two or three eclipses happen each eclipse season. In the sequence below, each eclipse is separated by a fortnight. The first and last eclipse in this sequence is separated by one synodic month.

Eclipse season of September–October 2098
September 25 Descending node (new moon)	October 10 Ascending node (full moon)	October 24 Descending node (new moon)
Partial solar eclipse Solar Saros 126	Total lunar eclipse Lunar Saros 138	Partial solar eclipse Solar Saros 164

== Related eclipses ==
=== Eclipses in 2098 ===
- A partial solar eclipse on April 1.
- A total lunar eclipse on April 15.
- A partial solar eclipse on September 25.
- A total lunar eclipse on October 10.
- A partial solar eclipse on October 24.

=== Solar Saros 164 ===
- Followed by: Solar eclipse of November 4, 2116

=== Solar eclipses of 2094–2098 ===
This eclipse is a member of a semester series. An eclipse in a semester series of solar eclipses repeats approximately every 177 days and 4 hours (a semester) at alternating nodes of the Moon's orbit.

The solar eclipses on January 16, 2094 (total) and July 12, 2094 (partial) occur in the previous lunar year eclipse set, and the partial solar eclipses on April 1, 2098 and September 25, 2098 occur in the next lunar year eclipse set.

Solar eclipse series sets from 2094 to 2098
Ascending node			Descending node		
Saros	Map	Gamma	Saros	Map	Gamma
119	June 13, 2094 Partial	−1.4613	124	December 7, 2094 Partial	1.1547
129	June 2, 2095 Total	−0.6396	134	November 27, 2095 Annular	0.4903
139	May 22, 2096 Total	0.1196	144	November 15, 2096 Annular	−0.20
149	May 11, 2097 Total	0.8516	154	November 4, 2097 Annular	−0.8926
159	May 1, 2098		164	October 24, 2098 Partial	−1.5407

=== Saros 164 ===
This eclipse is a part of Saros series 164, repeating every 18 years, 11 days, and containing 80 events. The series will start with a partial solar eclipse on October 24, 2098. It contains total eclipses from June 1, 2459 through June 20, 3090; hybrid eclipses from July 1, 3108 through August 3, 3162; and annular eclipses from August 13, 3180 through September 4, 3216. The series ends at member 80 as a partial eclipse on March 10, 3523. Its eclipses are tabulated in three columns; every third eclipse in the same column is one exeligmos apart, so they all cast shadows over approximately the same parts of the Earth.

The longest duration of totality will be produced by member 26 at 6 minutes, 30 seconds on July 25, 2549, and the longest duration of annularity will be produced by member 63 at 1 minutes, 21 seconds on September 4, 3216. All eclipses in this series occur at the Moon’s descending node of orbit.

Series members 1–6 occur between 2098 and 2200:
1	2	3
October 24, 2098	November 4, 2116	November 16, 2134
4	5	6
November 26, 2152	December 7, 2170	December 18, 2188

=== Metonic series ===
The metonic series repeats eclipses every 19 years (6939.69 days), lasting about 5 cycles. Eclipses occur in nearly the same calendar date. In addition, the octon subseries repeats 1/5 of that or every 3.8 years (1387.94 days). All eclipses in this table occur at the Moon's descending node.

22 eclipse events between June 1, 2011 and October 24, 2098
May 31–June 1	March 19–20	January 5–6	October 24–25	August 12–13
118	120	122	124	126
June 1, 2011	March 20, 2015	January 6, 2019	October 25, 2022	August 12, 2026
128	130	132	134	136
June 1, 2030	March 20, 2034	January 5, 2038	October 25, 2041	August 12, 2045
138	140	142	144	146
May 31, 2049	March 20, 2053	January 5, 2057	October 24, 2060	August 12, 2064
148	150	152	154	156
May 31, 2068	March 19, 2072	January 6, 2076	October 24, 2079	August 13, 2083
158	160	162	164	
June 1, 2087			October 24, 2098	

=== Tritos series ===
This eclipse is a part of a tritos cycle, repeating at alternating nodes every 135 synodic months (≈ 3986.63 days, or 11 years minus 1 month). Their appearance and longitude are irregular due to a lack of synchronization with the anomalistic month (period of perigee), but groupings of 3 tritos cycles (≈ 33 years minus 3 months) come close (≈ 434.044 anomalistic months), so eclipses are similar in these groupings.

The partial solar eclipse on October 24, 2098 (part of Saros 164) is also a part of this series but is not included in the table below.

Series members between 1801 and 2011
February 11, 1804 (Saros 137)	January 10, 1815 (Saros 138)	December 9, 1825 (Saros 139)	November 9, 1836 (Saros 140)	October 9, 1847 (Saros 141)
September 7, 1858 (Saros 142)	August 7, 1869 (Saros 143)	July 7, 1880 (Saros 144)	June 6, 1891 (Saros 145)	May 7, 1902 (Saros 146)
April 6, 1913 (Saros 147)	March 5, 1924 (Saros 148)	February 3, 1935 (Saros 149)	January 3, 1946 (Saros 150)	December 2, 1956 (Saros 151)
November 2, 1967 (Saros 152)	October 2, 1978 (Saros 153)	August 31, 1989 (Saros 154)	July 31, 2000 (Saros 155)	July 1, 2011 (Saros 156)
