= Solar eclipse of February 18, 2091 =

Future partial solar eclipse

- Partial eclipse
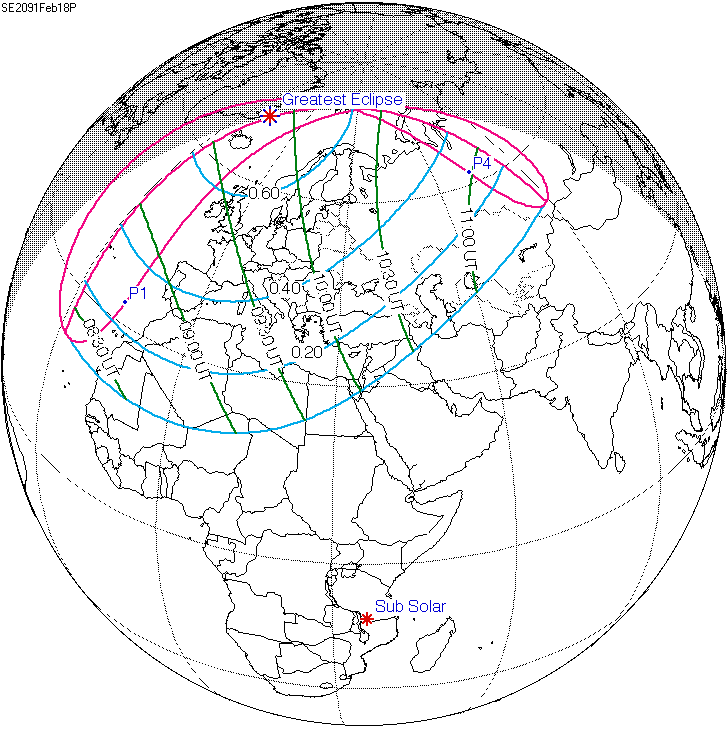
- Map
- Gamma: 1.1779
- Magnitude: 0.6558

Maximum eclipse
- Coordinates: 71.2°N 17.8°W

Times (UTC)
- Greatest eclipse: 9:54:40

References
- Saros: 122 (62 of 70)
- Catalog # (SE5000): 9712

A partial solar eclipse will occur at the Moon's descending node of orbit on Sunday, February 18, 2091, with a magnitude of 0.6558. A solar eclipse occurs when the Moon passes between Earth and the Sun, thereby totally or partly obscuring the image of the Sun for a viewer on Earth. A partial solar eclipse occurs in the polar regions of the Earth when the center of the Moon's shadow misses the Earth.

The partial solar eclipse will be visible for parts of Europe, North Africa, and Central Asia.

== Eclipse details ==
Shown below are two tables displaying details about this particular solar eclipse. The first table outlines times at which the Moon's penumbra or umbra attains the specific parameter, and the second table describes various other parameters pertaining to this eclipse.

February 18, 2091 Solar Eclipse Times
Event	Time (UTC)
First Penumbral External Contact	2091 February 18 at 07:53:39.7 UTC
Ecliptic Conjunction	2091 February 18 at 09:41:09.3 UTC
Greatest Eclipse	2091 February 18 at 09:54:39.8 UTC
Equatorial Conjunction	2091 February 18 at 10:31:28.4 UTC
Last Penumbral External Contact	2091 February 18 at 11:55:26.8 UTC

February 18, 2091 Solar Eclipse Parameters
Parameter	Value
Eclipse Magnitude	0.65581
Eclipse Obscuration	0.55496
Gamma	1.17790
Sun Right Ascension	22h08m17.5s
Sun Declination	-11°28'13.5"
Sun Semi-Diameter	16'11.1"
Sun Equatorial Horizontal Parallax	08.9"
Moon Right Ascension	22h07m09.8s
Moon Declination	-10°25'58.4"
Moon Semi-Diameter	14'56.6"
Moon Equatorial Horizontal Parallax	0°54'50.7"
ΔT	115.1 s

== Eclipse season ==
This eclipse is part of an eclipse season, a period, roughly every six months, when eclipses occur. Only two (or occasionally three) eclipse seasons occur each year, and each season lasts about 35 days and repeats just short of six months (173 days) later; thus two full eclipse seasons always occur each year. Either two or three eclipses happen each eclipse season. In the sequence below, each eclipse is separated by a fortnight.

Eclipse season of February–March 2091
February 18 Descending node (new moon)	March 5 Ascending node (full moon)
Partial solar eclipse Solar Saros 122	Total lunar eclipse Lunar Saros 134

== Related eclipses ==
=== Eclipses in 2091 ===
- A partial solar eclipse on February 18.
- A total lunar eclipse on March 5.
- A total solar eclipse on August 15.
- A total lunar eclipse on August 29.

=== Metonic ===
- Preceded by: Solar eclipse of May 2, 2087
- Followed by: Solar eclipse of December 7, 2094

=== Tzolkinex ===
- Preceded by: Solar eclipse of January 7, 2084
- Followed by: Solar eclipse of April 1, 2098

=== Half-Saros ===
- Preceded by: Lunar eclipse of February 13, 2082
- Followed by: Lunar eclipse of February 24, 2100

=== Tritos ===
- Preceded by: Solar eclipse of March 21, 2080
- Followed by: Solar eclipse of January 19, 2102

=== Solar Saros 122 ===
- Preceded by: Solar eclipse of February 7, 2073
- Followed by: Solar eclipse of March 1, 2109

=== Inex ===
- Preceded by: Solar eclipse of March 11, 2062
- Followed by: Solar eclipse of January 30, 2120

=== Triad ===
- Preceded by: Solar eclipse of April 19, 2004
- Followed by: Solar eclipse of December 20, 2177

=== Solar eclipses of 2091–2094 ===
This eclipse is a member of a semester series. An eclipse in a semester series of solar eclipses repeats approximately every 177 days and 4 hours (a semester) at alternating nodes of the Moon's orbit.

The partial solar eclipses on June 13, 2094 and December 7, 2094 occur in the next lunar year eclipse set.

Solar eclipse series sets from 2091 to 2094
Descending node			Ascending node		
Saros	Map	Gamma	Saros	Map	Gamma
122	February 18, 2091 Partial	1.1779	127	August 15, 2091 Total	−0.949
132	February 7, 2092 Annular	0.4322	137	August 3, 2092 Annular	−0.2044
142	January 27, 2093 Total	−0.2737	147	July 23, 2093 Annular	0.5717
152	January 16, 2094 Total	−0.9333	157	July 12, 2094 Partial	1.3150

=== Saros 122 ===
This eclipse is a part of Saros series 122, repeating every 18 years, 11 days, and containing 70 events. The series started with a partial solar eclipse on April 17, 991 AD. It contains total eclipses from July 12, 1135 through August 3, 1171; hybrid eclipses on August 13, 1189 and August 25, 1207; and annular eclipses from September 4, 1225 through October 10, 1874. The series ends at member 70 as a partial eclipse on May 17, 2235. Its eclipses are tabulated in three columns; every third eclipse in the same column is one exeligmos apart, so they all cast shadows over approximately the same parts of the Earth.

The longest duration of totality was produced by member 9 at 1 minutes, 25 seconds on July 12, 1135, and the longest duration of annularity was produced by member 50 at 6 minutes, 28 seconds on October 10, 1874. All eclipses in this series occur at the Moon’s descending node of orbit.

Series members 46–68 occur between 1801 and 2200:
46	47	48
August 28, 1802	September 7, 1820	September 18, 1838
49	50	51
September 29, 1856	October 10, 1874	October 20, 1892
52	53	54
November 2, 1910	November 12, 1928	November 23, 1946
55	56	57
December 4, 1964	December 15, 1982	December 25, 2000
58	59	60
January 6, 2019	January 16, 2037	January 27, 2055
61	62	63
February 7, 2073	February 18, 2091	March 1, 2109
64	65	66
March 13, 2127	March 23, 2145	April 3, 2163
67	68	
April 14, 2181	April 25, 2199	

=== Metonic series ===
The metonic series repeats eclipses every 19 years (6939.69 days), lasting about 5 cycles. Eclipses occur in nearly the same calendar date. In addition, the octon subseries repeats 1/5 of that or every 3.8 years (1387.94 days). All eclipses in this table occur at the Moon's descending node.

22 eclipse events between July 15, 2083 and December 7, 2170
July 14–15	May 2–3	February 18–19	December 7–8	September 25–26
118	120	122	124	126
July 15, 2083	May 2, 2087	February 18, 2091	December 7, 2094	September 25, 2098
128	130	132	134	136
July 15, 2102	May 3, 2106	February 18, 2110	December 8, 2113	September 26, 2117
138	140	142	144	146
July 14, 2121	May 3, 2125	February 18, 2129	December 7, 2132	September 26, 2136
148	150	152	154	156
July 14, 2140	May 3, 2144	February 19, 2148	December 8, 2151	September 26, 2155
158	160	162	164	
July 15, 2159			December 7, 2170	

=== Tritos series ===
This eclipse is a part of a tritos cycle, repeating at alternating nodes every 135 synodic months (≈ 3986.63 days, or 11 years minus 1 month). Their appearance and longitude are irregular due to a lack of synchronization with the anomalistic month (period of perigee), but groupings of 3 tritos cycles (≈ 33 years minus 3 months) come close (≈ 434.044 anomalistic months), so eclipses are similar in these groupings.

Series members between 2036 and 2200
July 23, 2036 (Saros 117)	June 23, 2047 (Saros 118)	May 22, 2058 (Saros 119)	April 21, 2069 (Saros 120)	March 21, 2080 (Saros 121)
February 18, 2091 (Saros 122)	January 19, 2102 (Saros 123)	December 19, 2112 (Saros 124)	November 18, 2123 (Saros 125)	October 17, 2134 (Saros 126)
September 16, 2145 (Saros 127)	August 16, 2156 (Saros 128)	July 16, 2167 (Saros 129)	June 16, 2178 (Saros 130)	May 15, 2189 (Saros 131)
April 14, 2200 (Saros 132)

=== Inex series ===
This eclipse is a part of the long period inex cycle, repeating at alternating nodes, every 358 synodic months (≈ 10,571.95 days, or 29 years minus 20 days). Their appearance and longitude are irregular due to a lack of synchronization with the anomalistic month (period of perigee). However, groupings of 3 inex cycles (≈ 87 years minus 2 months) comes close (≈ 1,151.02 anomalistic months), so eclipses are similar in these groupings.

Series members between 1801 and 2200
September 8, 1801 (Saros 112)	August 18, 1830 (Saros 113)	July 29, 1859 (Saros 114)
July 9, 1888 (Saros 115)	June 19, 1917 (Saros 116)	May 30, 1946 (Saros 117)
May 11, 1975 (Saros 118)	April 19, 2004 (Saros 119)	March 30, 2033 (Saros 120)
March 11, 2062 (Saros 121)	February 18, 2091 (Saros 122)	January 30, 2120 (Saros 123)
January 9, 2149 (Saros 124)	December 20, 2177 (Saros 125)	
