= Solar eclipse of May 2, 2087 =

Future partial solar eclipse

- Partial eclipse
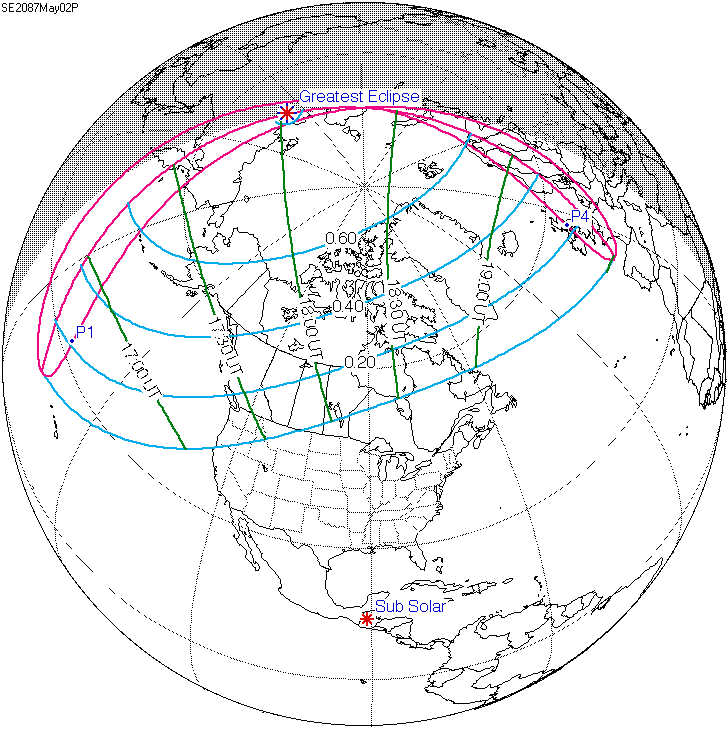
- Map
- Gamma: 1.1139
- Magnitude: 0.8011

Maximum eclipse
- Coordinates: 70.3°N 127.6°E

Times (UTC)
- Greatest eclipse: 18:04:42

References
- Saros: 120 (65 of 71)
- Catalog # (SE5000): 9704

A partial solar eclipse will occur at the Moon's descending node of orbit on Friday, May 2, 2087, with a magnitude of 0.8011. A solar eclipse occurs when the Moon passes between Earth and the Sun, thereby totally or partly obscuring the image of the Sun for a viewer on Earth. A partial solar eclipse occurs in the polar regions of the Earth when the center of the Moon's shadow misses the Earth.

The partial solar eclipse will be visible for parts of eastern Russia, northern North America, and Northern Europe.

== Eclipse details ==
Shown below are two tables displaying details about this particular solar eclipse. The first table outlines times at which the Moon's penumbra or umbra attains the specific parameter, and the second table describes various other parameters pertaining to this eclipse.

May 2, 2087 Solar Eclipse Times
| Event | Time (UTC) |
|---|---|
| First Penumbral External Contact | 2087 May 2 at 16:16:42.0 UTC |
| Ecliptic Conjunction | 2087 May 2 at 17:53:39.8 UTC |
| Greatest Eclipse | 2087 May 2 at 18:04:42.0 UTC |
| Equatorial Conjunction | 2087 May 2 at 18:29:25.0 UTC |
| Last Penumbral External Contact | 2087 May 2 at 19:52:30.9 UTC |

May 2, 2087 Solar Eclipse Parameters
| Parameter | Value |
|---|---|
| Eclipse Magnitude | 0.80105 |
| Eclipse Obscuration | 0.76005 |
| Gamma | 1.11395 |
| Sun Right Ascension | 02h40m34.0s |
| Sun Declination | +15°36'24.7" |
| Sun Semi-Diameter | 15'52.3" |
| Sun Equatorial Horizontal Parallax | 08.7" |
| Moon Right Ascension | 02h39m33.9s |
| Moon Declination | +16°43'04.4" |
| Moon Semi-Diameter | 16'43.4" |
| Moon Equatorial Horizontal Parallax | 1°01'22.6" |
| ΔT | 111.7 s |

== Eclipse season ==
This eclipse is part of an eclipse season, a period, roughly every six months, when eclipses occur. Only two (or occasionally three) eclipse seasons occur each year, and each season lasts about 35 days and repeats just short of six months (173 days) later; thus two full eclipse seasons always occur each year. Either two or three eclipses happen each eclipse season. In the sequence below, each eclipse is separated by a fortnight. The first and last eclipse in this sequence is separated by one synodic month.

Eclipse season of May–June 2087
| May 2 Descending node (new moon) | May 17 Ascending node (full moon) | June 1 Descending node (new moon) |
|---|---|---|
| Partial solar eclipse Solar Saros 120 | Total lunar eclipse Lunar Saros 132 | Partial solar eclipse Solar Saros 158 |

== Related eclipses ==
=== Eclipses in 2087 ===
- A partial solar eclipse on May 2.
- A total lunar eclipse on May 17.
- A partial solar eclipse on June 1.
- A partial solar eclipse on October 26.
- A total lunar eclipse on November 10.

=== Metonic ===
- Preceded by: Solar eclipse of July 15, 2083
- Followed by: Solar eclipse of February 18, 2091

=== Tzolkinex ===
- Preceded by: Solar eclipse of March 21, 2080
- Followed by: Solar eclipse of June 13, 2094

=== Half-Saros ===
- Preceded by: Lunar eclipse of April 27, 2078
- Followed by: Lunar eclipse of May 7, 2096

=== Tritos ===
- Preceded by: Solar eclipse of June 1, 2076
- Followed by: Solar eclipse of April 1, 2098

=== Solar Saros 120 ===
- Preceded by: Solar eclipse of April 21, 2069
- Followed by: Solar eclipse of May 14, 2105

=== Inex ===
- Preceded by: Solar eclipse of May 22, 2058
- Followed by: Solar eclipse of April 13, 2116

=== Triad ===
- Preceded by: Solar eclipse of July 1, 2000
- Followed by: Solar eclipse of March 3, 2174

=== Solar eclipses of 2087–2090 ===
This eclipse is a member of a semester series. An eclipse in a semester series of solar eclipses repeats approximately every 177 days and 4 hours (a semester) at alternating nodes of the Moon's orbit.

The partial solar eclipse on June 1, 2087 occurs in the previous lunar year eclipse set.

Solar eclipse series sets from 2087 to 2090
| Descending node | | | Ascending node | | |
| Saros | Map | Gamma | Saros | Map | Gamma |
| 120 | May 2, 2087 Partial | 1.1139 | 125 | October 26, 2087 Partial | −1.2882 |
| 130 | April 21, 2088 Total | 0.4135 | 135 | October 14, 2088 Annular | −0.5349 |
| 140 | April 10, 2089 Annular | −0.3319 | 145 | October 4, 2089 Total | 0.2167 |
| 150 | March 31, 2090 Partial | −1.1028 | 155 | September 23, 2090 Total | 0.9157 |

=== Saros 120 ===
This eclipse is a part of Saros series 120, repeating every 18 years, 11 days, and containing 71 events. The series started with a partial solar eclipse on May 27, 933 AD. It contains annular eclipses from August 11, 1059 through April 26, 1492; hybrid eclipses from May 8, 1510 through June 8, 1564; and total eclipses from June 20, 1582 through March 30, 2033. The series ends at member 71 as a partial eclipse on July 7, 2195. Its eclipses are tabulated in three columns; every third eclipse in the same column is one exeligmos apart, so they all cast shadows over approximately the same parts of the Earth.

The longest duration of annularity was produced by member 11 at 6 minutes, 24 seconds on September 11, 1113, and the longest duration of totality was produced by member 60 at 2 minutes, 50 seconds on March 9, 1997. All eclipses in this series occur at the Moon’s descending node of orbit.

Series members 50–71 occur between 1801 and 2195:
| 50 | 51 | 52 |
|---|---|---|
| November 19, 1816 | November 30, 1834 | December 11, 1852 |
| 53 | 54 | 55 |
| December 22, 1870 | January 1, 1889 | January 14, 1907 |
| 56 | 57 | 58 |
| January 24, 1925 | February 4, 1943 | February 15, 1961 |
| 59 | 60 | 61 |
| February 26, 1979 | March 9, 1997 | March 20, 2015 |
| 62 | 63 | 64 |
| March 30, 2033 | April 11, 2051 | April 21, 2069 |
| 65 | 66 | 67 |
| May 2, 2087 | May 14, 2105 | May 25, 2123 |
| 68 | 69 | 70 |
| June 4, 2141 | June 16, 2159 | June 26, 2177 |
71
July 7, 2195

=== Metonic series ===
The metonic series repeats eclipses every 19 years (6939.69 days), lasting about 5 cycles. Eclipses occur in nearly the same calendar date. In addition, the octon subseries repeats 1/5 of that or every 3.8 years (1387.94 days). All eclipses in this table occur at the Moon's descending node.

22 eclipse events between July 15, 2083 and December 7, 2170
| July 14–15 | May 2–3 | February 18–19 | December 7–8 | September 25–26 |
| 118 | 120 | 122 | 124 | 126 |
|---|---|---|---|---|
| July 15, 2083 | May 2, 2087 | February 18, 2091 | December 7, 2094 | September 25, 2098 |
| 128 | 130 | 132 | 134 | 136 |
| July 15, 2102 | May 3, 2106 | February 18, 2110 | December 8, 2113 | September 26, 2117 |
| 138 | 140 | 142 | 144 | 146 |
| July 14, 2121 | May 3, 2125 | February 18, 2129 | December 7, 2132 | September 26, 2136 |
| 148 | 150 | 152 | 154 | 156 |
| July 14, 2140 | May 3, 2144 | February 19, 2148 | December 8, 2151 | September 26, 2155 |
| 158 | 160 | 162 | 164 | |
| July 15, 2159 | | | December 7, 2170 | |

=== Tritos series ===
This eclipse is a part of a tritos cycle, repeating at alternating nodes every 135 synodic months (≈ 3986.63 days, or 11 years minus 1 month). Their appearance and longitude are irregular due to a lack of synchronization with the anomalistic month (period of perigee), but groupings of 3 tritos cycles (≈ 33 years minus 3 months) come close (≈ 434.044 anomalistic months), so eclipses are similar in these groupings.

Series members between 2054 and 2200
| August 3, 2054 (Saros 117) | July 3, 2065 (Saros 118) | June 1, 2076 (Saros 119) | May 2, 2087 (Saros 120) | April 1, 2098 (Saros 121) |
| March 1, 2109 (Saros 122) | January 30, 2120 (Saros 123) | December 30, 2130 (Saros 124) | November 28, 2141 (Saros 125) | October 28, 2152 (Saros 126) |
| September 28, 2163 (Saros 127) | August 27, 2174 (Saros 128) | July 26, 2185 (Saros 129) | June 26, 2196 (Saros 130) | |

=== Inex series ===
This eclipse is a part of the long period inex cycle, repeating at alternating nodes, every 358 synodic months (≈ 10,571.95 days, or 29 years minus 20 days). Their appearance and longitude are irregular due to a lack of synchronization with the anomalistic month (period of perigee). However, groupings of 3 inex cycles (≈ 87 years minus 2 months) comes close (≈ 1,151.02 anomalistic months), so eclipses are similar in these groupings.

Series members between 1801 and 2200
| October 31, 1826 (Saros 111) | | |
| August 31, 1913 (Saros 114) | August 12, 1942 (Saros 115) | July 22, 1971 (Saros 116) |
| July 1, 2000 (Saros 117) | June 12, 2029 (Saros 118) | May 22, 2058 (Saros 119) |
| May 2, 2087 (Saros 120) | April 13, 2116 (Saros 121) | March 23, 2145 (Saros 122) |
| March 3, 2174 (Saros 123) | | |
