= Solar eclipse of September 25, 2098 =

Future partial solar eclipse

- Partial eclipse
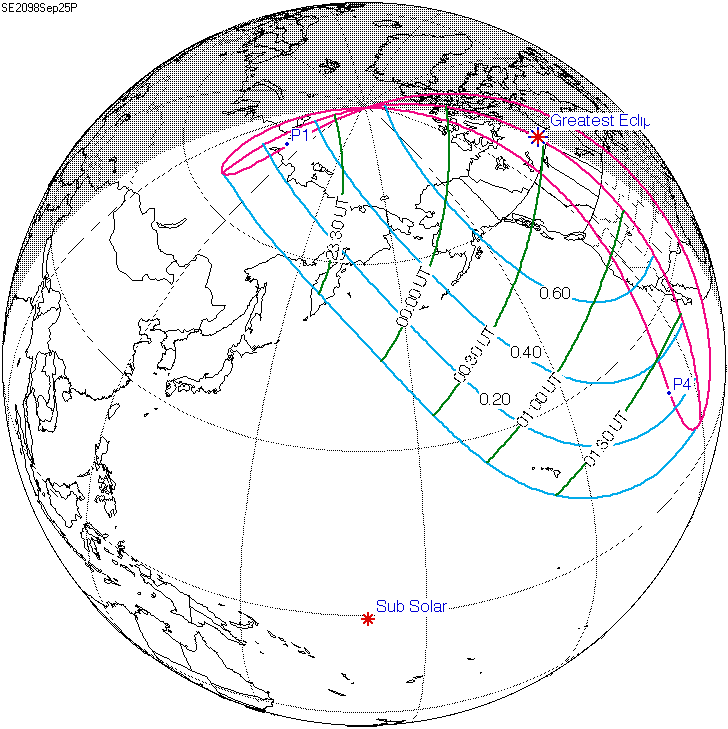
- Map
- Gamma: 1.14
- Magnitude: 0.7871

Maximum eclipse
- Coordinates: 61.1°N 101°W

Times (UTC)
- Greatest eclipse: 0:31:16

References
- Saros: 126 (52 of 72)
- Catalog # (SE5000): 9729

A partial solar eclipse will occur at the Moon's descending node of orbit between Wednesday, September 24 and Thursday, September 25, 2098, with a magnitude of 0.7871. A solar eclipse occurs when the Moon passes between Earth and the Sun, thereby totally or partly obscuring the image of the Sun for a viewer on Earth. A partial solar eclipse occurs in the polar regions of the Earth when the center of the Moon's shadow misses the Earth.

The partial solar eclipse will be visible for parts of the Russian Far East, Hawaii, and western North America.

== Eclipse details ==
Shown below are two tables displaying details about this particular solar eclipse. The first table outlines times at which the Moon's penumbra or umbra attains the specific parameter, and the second table describes various other parameters pertaining to this eclipse.

September 25, 2098 Solar Eclipse Times
Event	Time (UTC)
First Penumbral External Contact	2098 September 24 at 22:41:16.8 UTC
Equatorial Conjunction	2098 September 24 at 23:26:40.4 UTC
Ecliptic Conjunction	2098 September 25 at 00:20:01.8 UTC
Greatest Eclipse	2098 September 25 at 00:31:16.2 UTC
Last Penumbral External Contact	2098 September 25 at 02:21:44.9 UTC

September 25, 2098 Solar Eclipse Parameters
Parameter	Value
Eclipse Magnitude	0.78710
Eclipse Obscuration	0.73803
Gamma	1.11845
Sun Right Ascension	12h09m17.5s
Sun Declination	-01°00'22.0"
Sun Semi-Diameter	15'56.5"
Sun Equatorial Horizontal Parallax	08.8"
Moon Right Ascension	12h11m27.7s
Moon Declination	-00°01'23.2"
Moon Semi-Diameter	16'27.0"
Moon Equatorial Horizontal Parallax	1°00'22.3"
ΔT	122.3 s

== Eclipse season ==
This eclipse is part of an eclipse season, a period, roughly every six months, when eclipses occur. Only two (or occasionally three) eclipse seasons occur each year, and each season lasts about 35 days and repeats just short of six months (173 days) later; thus two full eclipse seasons always occur each year. Either two or three eclipses happen each eclipse season. In the sequence below, each eclipse is separated by a fortnight. The first and last eclipse in this sequence is separated by one synodic month.

Eclipse season of September–October 2098
September 25 Descending node (new moon)	October 10 Ascending node (full moon)	October 24 Descending node (new moon)
Partial solar eclipse Solar Saros 126	Total lunar eclipse Lunar Saros 138	Partial solar eclipse Solar Saros 164

== Related eclipses ==
=== Eclipses in 2098 ===
- A partial solar eclipse on April 1.
- A total lunar eclipse on April 15.
- A partial solar eclipse on September 25.
- A total lunar eclipse on October 10.
- A partial solar eclipse on October 24.

=== Metonic ===
- Preceded by: Solar eclipse of December 7, 2094
- Followed by: Solar eclipse of July 15, 2102

=== Tzolkinex ===
- Preceded by: Solar eclipse of August 15, 2091
- Followed by: Solar eclipse of November 6, 2105

=== Half-Saros ===
- Preceded by: Lunar eclipse of September 19, 2089
- Followed by: Lunar eclipse of October 2, 2107

=== Tritos ===
- Preceded by: Solar eclipse of October 26, 2087
- Followed by: Solar eclipse of August 26, 2109

=== Solar Saros 126 ===
- Preceded by: Solar eclipse of September 13, 2080
- Followed by: Solar eclipse of October 6, 2116

=== Inex ===
- Preceded by: Solar eclipse of October 15, 2069
- Followed by: Solar eclipse of September 6, 2127

=== Triad ===
- Preceded by: Solar eclipse of November 25, 2011
- Followed by: Solar eclipse of July 26, 2185

=== Solar eclipses of 2098–2101 ===
This eclipse is a member of a semester series. An eclipse in a semester series of solar eclipses repeats approximately every 177 days and 4 hours (a semester) at alternating nodes of the Moon's orbit.

The partial solar eclipse on October 24, 2098 occurs in the previous lunar year eclipse set.

Solar eclipse series sets from 2098 to 2101
Ascending node			Descending node		
Saros	Map	Gamma	Saros	Map	Gamma
121	April 1, 2098 Partial	−1.1005	126	September 25, 2098 Partial	1.14
131	March 21, 2099 Annular	−0.4016	136	September 14, 2099 Total	0.3942
141	March 10, 2100 Annular	0.3077	146	September 4, 2100 Total	−0.3384
151	February 28, 2101 Annular	0.9964	156	August 24, 2101 Partial	−1.1392

=== Saros 126 ===
This eclipse is a part of Saros series 126, repeating every 18 years, 11 days, and containing 72 events. The series started with a partial solar eclipse on March 10, 1179. It contains annular eclipses from June 4, 1323 through April 4, 1810; hybrid eclipses from April 14, 1828 through May 6, 1864; and total eclipses from May 17, 1882 through August 23, 2044. The series ends at member 72 as a partial eclipse on May 3, 2459. Its eclipses are tabulated in three columns; every third eclipse in the same column is one exeligmos apart, so they all cast shadows over approximately the same parts of the Earth.

The longest duration of annularity was produced by member 11 at 6 minutes, 30 seconds on June 26, 1359, and the longest duration of totality was produced by member 45 at 2 minutes, 36 seconds on July 10, 1972. All eclipses in this series occur at the Moon’s descending node of orbit.

Series members 36–57 occur between 1801 and 2200:
36	37	38
April 4, 1810	April 14, 1828	April 25, 1846
39	40	41
May 6, 1864	May 17, 1882	May 28, 1900
42	43	44
June 8, 1918	June 19, 1936	June 30, 1954
45	46	47
July 10, 1972	July 22, 1990	August 1, 2008
48	49	50
August 12, 2026	August 23, 2044	September 3, 2062
51	52	53
September 13, 2080	September 25, 2098	October 6, 2116
54	55	56
October 17, 2134	October 28, 2152	November 8, 2170
57
November 18, 2188

=== Metonic series ===
The metonic series repeats eclipses every 19 years (6939.69 days), lasting about 5 cycles. Eclipses occur in nearly the same calendar date. In addition, the octon subseries repeats 1/5 of that or every 3.8 years (1387.94 days). All eclipses in this table occur at the Moon's descending node.

22 eclipse events between July 15, 2083 and December 7, 2170
July 14–15	May 2–3	February 18–19	December 7–8	September 25–26
118	120	122	124	126
July 15, 2083	May 2, 2087	February 18, 2091	December 7, 2094	September 25, 2098
128	130	132	134	136
July 15, 2102	May 3, 2106	February 18, 2110	December 8, 2113	September 26, 2117
138	140	142	144	146
July 14, 2121	May 3, 2125	February 18, 2129	December 7, 2132	September 26, 2136
148	150	152	154	156
July 14, 2140	May 3, 2144	February 19, 2148	December 8, 2151	September 26, 2155
158	160	162	164	
July 15, 2159			December 7, 2170	

=== Tritos series ===
This eclipse is a part of a tritos cycle, repeating at alternating nodes every 135 synodic months (≈ 3986.63 days, or 11 years minus 1 month). Their appearance and longitude are irregular due to a lack of synchronization with the anomalistic month (period of perigee), but groupings of 3 tritos cycles (≈ 33 years minus 3 months) come close (≈ 434.044 anomalistic months), so eclipses are similar in these groupings.

The partial solar eclipses on April 8, 1902 (part of Saros 108) and January 5, 1935 (part of Saros 111) are also a part of this series but are not included in the table below.

Series members between 2000 and 2200
July 1, 2000 (Saros 117)	June 1, 2011 (Saros 118)	April 30, 2022 (Saros 119)	March 30, 2033 (Saros 120)	February 28, 2044 (Saros 121)
January 27, 2055 (Saros 122)	December 27, 2065 (Saros 123)	November 26, 2076 (Saros 124)	October 26, 2087 (Saros 125)	September 25, 2098 (Saros 126)
August 26, 2109 (Saros 127)	July 25, 2120 (Saros 128)	June 25, 2131 (Saros 129)	May 25, 2142 (Saros 130)	April 23, 2153 (Saros 131)
March 23, 2164 (Saros 132)	February 21, 2175 (Saros 133)	January 20, 2186 (Saros 134)	December 19, 2196 (Saros 135)	

=== Inex series ===
This eclipse is a part of the long period inex cycle, repeating at alternating nodes, every 358 synodic months (≈ 10,571.95 days, or 29 years minus 20 days). Their appearance and longitude are irregular due to a lack of synchronization with the anomalistic month (period of perigee). However, groupings of 3 inex cycles (≈ 87 years minus 2 months) comes close (≈ 1,151.02 anomalistic months), so eclipses are similar in these groupings.

Series members between 1801 and 2200
April 14, 1809 (Saros 116)	March 25, 1838 (Saros 117)	March 6, 1867 (Saros 118)
February 13, 1896 (Saros 119)	January 24, 1925 (Saros 120)	January 5, 1954 (Saros 121)
December 15, 1982 (Saros 122)	November 25, 2011 (Saros 123)	November 4, 2040 (Saros 124)
October 15, 2069 (Saros 125)	September 25, 2098 (Saros 126)	September 6, 2127 (Saros 127)
August 16, 2156 (Saros 128)	July 26, 2185 (Saros 129)	
