= Solar eclipse of April 1, 2098 =

Future partial solar eclipse

- Partial eclipse
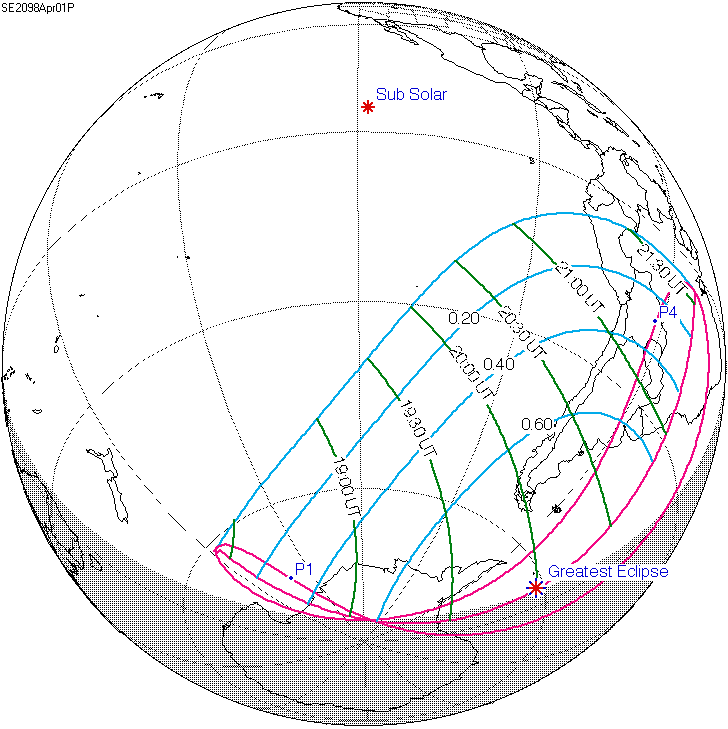
- Map
- Gamma: −1.1005
- Magnitude: 0.7984

Maximum eclipse
- Coordinates: 61°S 38.1°W

Times (UTC)
- Greatest eclipse: 20:02:31

References
- Saros: 121 (65 of 71)
- Catalog # (SE5000): 9728

A partial solar eclipse will occur at the Moon's ascending node of orbit on Tuesday, April 1, 2098, with a magnitude of 0.7984. A solar eclipse occurs when the Moon passes between Earth and the Sun, thereby totally or partly obscuring the image of the Sun for a viewer on Earth. A partial solar eclipse occurs in the polar regions of the Earth when the center of the Moon's shadow misses the Earth.

The partial solar eclipse will be visible for parts of Antarctica and southern and central South America.

== Eclipse details ==
Shown below are two tables displaying details about this particular solar eclipse. The first table outlines times at which the Moon's penumbra or umbra attains the specific parameter, and the second table describes various other parameters pertaining to this eclipse.

April 1, 2098 Solar Eclipse Times
Event	Time (UTC)
First Penumbral External Contact	2098 April 1 at 17:58:11.5 UTC
Equatorial Conjunction	2098 April 1 at 18:54:45.1 UTC
Ecliptic Conjunction	2098 April 1 at 19:50:13.0 UTC
Greatest Eclipse	2098 April 1 at 20:02:30.8 UTC
Last Penumbral External Contact	2098 April 1 at 22:07:11.4 UTC

April 1, 2098 Solar Eclipse Parameters
Parameter	Value
Eclipse Magnitude	0.79844
Eclipse Obscuration	0.73374
Gamma	−1.10049
Sun Right Ascension	00h46m32.1s
Sun Declination	+04°59'38.4"
Sun Semi-Diameter	16'00.4"
Sun Equatorial Horizontal Parallax	08.8"
Moon Right Ascension	00h48m30.7s
Moon Declination	+04°05'18.4"
Moon Semi-Diameter	15'21.2"
Moon Equatorial Horizontal Parallax	0°56'20.9"
ΔT	121.9 s

== Eclipse season ==
This eclipse is part of an eclipse season, a period, roughly every six months, when eclipses occur. Only two (or occasionally three) eclipse seasons occur each year, and each season lasts about 35 days and repeats just short of six months (173 days) later; thus two full eclipse seasons always occur each year. Either two or three eclipses happen each eclipse season. In the sequence below, each eclipse is separated by a fortnight.

Eclipse season of April 2098
April 1 Ascending node (new moon)	April 15 Descending node (full moon)
Partial solar eclipse Solar Saros 121	Total lunar eclipse Lunar Saros 133

== Related eclipses ==
=== Eclipses in 2098 ===
- A partial solar eclipse on April 1.
- A total lunar eclipse on April 15.
- A partial solar eclipse on September 25.
- A total lunar eclipse on October 10.
- A partial solar eclipse on October 24.

=== Metonic ===
- Preceded by: Solar eclipse of June 13, 2094
- Followed by: Solar eclipse of January 19, 2102

=== Tzolkinex ===
- Preceded by: Solar eclipse of February 18, 2091
- Followed by: Solar eclipse of May 14, 2105

=== Half-Saros ===
- Preceded by: Lunar eclipse of March 26, 2089
- Followed by: Lunar eclipse of April 7, 2107

=== Tritos ===
- Preceded by: Solar eclipse of May 2, 2087
- Followed by: Solar eclipse of March 1, 2109

=== Solar Saros 121 ===
- Preceded by: Solar eclipse of March 21, 2080
- Followed by: Solar eclipse of April 13, 2116

=== Inex ===
- Preceded by: Solar eclipse of April 21, 2069
- Followed by: Solar eclipse of March 13, 2127

=== Triad ===
- Preceded by: Solar eclipse of June 1, 2011
- Followed by: Solar eclipse of January 31, 2185

=== Solar eclipses of 2098–2101 ===
This eclipse is a member of a semester series. An eclipse in a semester series of solar eclipses repeats approximately every 177 days and 4 hours (a semester) at alternating nodes of the Moon's orbit.

The partial solar eclipse on October 24, 2098 occurs in the previous lunar year eclipse set.

Solar eclipse series sets from 2098 to 2101
Ascending node			Descending node		
Saros	Map	Gamma	Saros	Map	Gamma
121	April 1, 2098 Partial	−1.1005	126	September 25, 2098 Partial	1.14
131	March 21, 2099 Annular	−0.4016	136	September 14, 2099 Total	0.3942
141	March 10, 2100 Annular	0.3077	146	September 4, 2100 Total	−0.3384
151	February 28, 2101 Annular	0.9964	156	August 24, 2101 Partial	−1.1392

=== Saros 121 ===
This eclipse is a part of Saros series 121, repeating every 18 years, 11 days, and containing 71 events. The series started with a partial solar eclipse on April 25, 944 AD. It contains total eclipses from July 10, 1070 through October 9, 1809; hybrid eclipses on October 20, 1827 and October 30, 1845; and annular eclipses from November 11, 1863 through February 28, 2044. The series ends at member 71 as a partial eclipse on June 7, 2206. Its eclipses are tabulated in three columns; every third eclipse in the same column is one exeligmos apart, so they all cast shadows over approximately the same parts of the Earth.

The longest duration of totality was produced by member 39 at 6 minutes, 20 seconds on June 21, 1629, and the longest duration of annularity will be produced by member 62 at 2 minutes, 27 seconds on February 28, 2044. All eclipses in this series occur at the Moon’s ascending node of orbit.

Series members 49–70 occur between 1801 and 2200:
49	50	51
October 9, 1809	October 20, 1827	October 30, 1845
52	53	54
November 11, 1863	November 21, 1881	December 3, 1899
55	56	57
December 14, 1917	December 25, 1935	January 5, 1954
58	59	60
January 16, 1972	January 26, 1990	February 7, 2008
61	62	63
February 17, 2026	February 28, 2044	March 11, 2062
64	65	66
March 21, 2080	April 1, 2098	April 13, 2116
67	68	69
April 24, 2134	May 4, 2152	May 16, 2170
70
May 26, 2188

=== Metonic series ===
The metonic series repeats eclipses every 19 years (6939.69 days), lasting about 5 cycles. Eclipses occur in nearly the same calendar date. In addition, the octon subseries repeats 1/5 of that or every 3.8 years (1387.94 days). All eclipses in this table occur at the Moon's ascending node.

23 eclipse events between June 13, 2094 and November 7, 2181
June 13–14	April 1–2	January 19–20	November 6–7	August 25–26
119	121	123	125	127
June 13, 2094	April 1, 2098	January 19, 2102	November 6, 2105	August 26, 2109
129	131	133	135	137
June 13, 2113	April 2, 2117	January 19, 2121	November 6, 2124	August 25, 2128
139	141	143	145	147
June 13, 2132	April 1, 2136	January 20, 2140	November 7, 2143	August 26, 2147
149	151	153	155	157
June 14, 2151	April 2, 2155	January 19, 2159	November 7, 2162	August 25, 2166
159	161	163	165	
June 14, 2170	April 1, 2174		November 7, 2181	

=== Tritos series ===
This eclipse is a part of a tritos cycle, repeating at alternating nodes every 135 synodic months (≈ 3986.63 days, or 11 years minus 1 month). Their appearance and longitude are irregular due to a lack of synchronization with the anomalistic month (period of perigee), but groupings of 3 tritos cycles (≈ 33 years minus 3 months) come close (≈ 434.044 anomalistic months), so eclipses are similar in these groupings.

Series members between 2054 and 2200
August 3, 2054 (Saros 117)	July 3, 2065 (Saros 118)	June 1, 2076 (Saros 119)	May 2, 2087 (Saros 120)	April 1, 2098 (Saros 121)
March 1, 2109 (Saros 122)	January 30, 2120 (Saros 123)	December 30, 2130 (Saros 124)	November 28, 2141 (Saros 125)	October 28, 2152 (Saros 126)
September 28, 2163 (Saros 127)	August 27, 2174 (Saros 128)	July 26, 2185 (Saros 129)	June 26, 2196 (Saros 130)	

=== Inex series ===
This eclipse is a part of the long period inex cycle, repeating at alternating nodes, every 358 synodic months (≈ 10,571.95 days, or 29 years minus 20 days). Their appearance and longitude are irregular due to a lack of synchronization with the anomalistic month (period of perigee). However, groupings of 3 inex cycles (≈ 87 years minus 2 months) comes close (≈ 1,151.02 anomalistic months), so eclipses are similar in these groupings.

Series members between 1801 and 2200
October 19, 1808 (Saros 111)		
August 20, 1895 (Saros 114)	July 31, 1924 (Saros 115)	July 11, 1953 (Saros 116)
June 21, 1982 (Saros 117)	June 1, 2011 (Saros 118)	May 11, 2040 (Saros 119)
April 21, 2069 (Saros 120)	April 1, 2098 (Saros 121)	March 13, 2127 (Saros 122)
February 21, 2156 (Saros 123)	January 31, 2185 (Saros 124)	
