= October 14 solar eclipse =

October 14 solar eclipse may refer to:

- Solar eclipse of October 14, 2004, a partial solar eclipse
- Solar eclipse of October 14, 2023, an annular solar eclipse
- Solar eclipse of October 14, 2042, an annular solar eclipse
- Solar eclipse of October 14, 2088, an annular solar eclipse
