= Solar eclipse of July 3, 2084 =

Future annular solar eclipse

- Annular eclipse
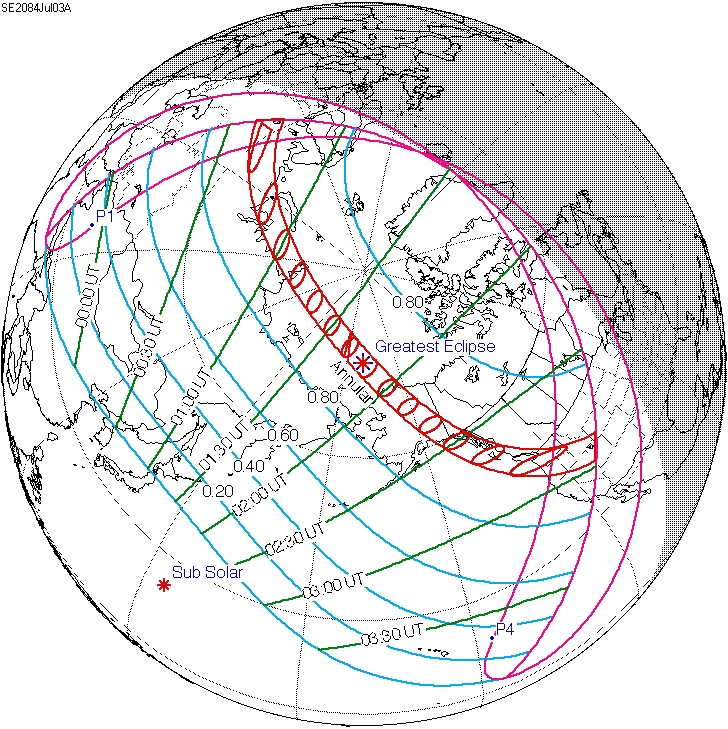
- Map
- Gamma: 0.8208
- Magnitude: 0.9421

Maximum eclipse
- Duration: 265 s (4 min 25 s)
- Coordinates: 75°N 169.1°W
- Max. width of band: 377 km (234 mi)

Times (UTC)
- Greatest eclipse: 1:50:26

References
- Saros: 128 (62 of 73)
- Catalog # (SE5000): 9697

An annular solar eclipse will occur at the Moon's descending node of orbit between Sunday, July 2 and Monday, July 3, 2084, with a magnitude of 0.9421. A solar eclipse occurs when the Moon passes between Earth and the Sun, thereby totally or partly obscuring the image of the Sun for a viewer on Earth. An annular solar eclipse occurs when the Moon's apparent diameter is smaller than the Sun's, blocking most of the Sun's light and causing the Sun to look like an annulus (ring). An annular eclipse appears as a partial eclipse over a region of the Earth thousands of kilometres wide. Occurring about 10 minutes after apogee (on July 3, 2084, at 1:40 UTC), the Moon's apparent diameter will be near its minimum. Thus, apogee did occur slightly before the peak of this eclipse.

The path of annularity will be visible from parts of Russia (in European Russia north-east of Moscow, passing through Yaroslavl, Vologda and Syktyvkar), Alaska, western Canada, Washington, Oregon, Idaho, northeastern California, Nevada, Utah, and Wyoming. A partial solar eclipse will also be visible for parts of Scandinavia, East Asia, Russia, Hawaii, and western North America.

== Eclipse details ==
Shown below are two tables displaying details about this particular solar eclipse. The first table outlines times at which the Moon's penumbra or umbra attains the specific parameter, and the second table describes various other parameters pertaining to this eclipse.

July 3, 2084 Solar Eclipse Times
Event	Time (UTC)
First Penumbral External Contact	2084 July 2 at 23:12:22.5 UTC
First Umbral External Contact	2084 July 3 at 00:39:09.2 UTC
First Central Line	2084 July 3 at 00:43:07.9 UTC
First Umbral Internal Contact	2084 July 3 at 00:47:16.7 UTC
Equatorial Conjunction	2084 July 3 at 01:31:41.2 UTC
Ecliptic Conjunction	2084 July 3 at 01:40:42.9 UTC
Greatest Duration	2084 July 3 at 01:47:23.5 UTC
Greatest Eclipse	2084 July 3 at 01:50:25.9 UTC
Last Umbral Internal Contact	2084 July 3 at 02:53:47.7 UTC
Last Central Line	2084 July 3 at 02:57:56.2 UTC
Last Umbral External Contact	2084 July 3 at 03:01:54.7 UTC
Last Penumbral External Contact	2084 July 3 at 04:28:37.1 UTC

July 3, 2084 Solar Eclipse Parameters
Parameter	Value
Eclipse Magnitude	0.94207
Eclipse Obscuration	0.88750
Gamma	0.82080
Sun Right Ascension	06h52m43.5s
Sun Declination	+22°52'33.4"
Sun Semi-Diameter	15'43.9"
Sun Equatorial Horizontal Parallax	08.6"
Moon Right Ascension	06h53m20.0s
Moon Declination	+23°35'54.8"
Moon Semi-Diameter	14'41.9"
Moon Equatorial Horizontal Parallax	0°53'56.6"
ΔT	109.2 s

== Eclipse season ==
This eclipse is part of an eclipse season, a period, roughly every six months, when eclipses occur. Only two (or occasionally three) eclipse seasons occur each year, and each season lasts about 35 days and repeats just short of six months (173 days) later; thus two full eclipse seasons always occur each year. Either two or three eclipses happen each eclipse season. In the sequence below, each eclipse is separated by a fortnight.

Eclipse season of July 2084
July 3 Descending node (new moon)	July 17 Ascending node (full moon)
Annular solar eclipse Solar Saros 128	Partial lunar eclipse Lunar Saros 140

== Related eclipses ==
=== Eclipses in 2084 ===
- A partial solar eclipse on January 7.
- A total lunar eclipse on January 22.
- An annular solar eclipse on July 3.
- A partial lunar eclipse on July 17.
- A total solar eclipse on December 27.

=== Metonic ===
- Preceded by: Solar eclipse of September 13, 2080
- Followed by: Solar eclipse of April 21, 2088

=== Tzolkinex ===
- Preceded by: Solar eclipse of May 22, 2077
- Followed by: Solar eclipse of August 15, 2091

=== Half-Saros ===
- Preceded by: Lunar eclipse of June 28, 2075
- Followed by: Lunar eclipse of July 8, 2093

=== Tritos ===
- Preceded by: Solar eclipse of August 3, 2073
- Followed by: Solar eclipse of June 2, 2095

=== Solar Saros 128 ===
- Preceded by: Solar eclipse of June 22, 2066
- Followed by: Solar eclipse of July 15, 2102

=== Inex ===
- Preceded by: Solar eclipse of July 24, 2055
- Followed by: Solar eclipse of June 13, 2113

=== Triad ===
- Preceded by: Solar eclipse of September 2, 1997
- Followed by: Solar eclipse of May 5, 2171

=== Solar eclipses of 2083–2087 ===
This eclipse is a member of a semester series. An eclipse in a semester series of solar eclipses repeats approximately every 177 days and 4 hours (a semester) at alternating nodes of the Moon's orbit.

The partial solar eclipses on February 16, 2083 and August 13, 2083 occur in the previous lunar year eclipse set, and the partial solar eclipses on May 2, 2087 and October 26, 2087 occur in the next lunar year eclipse set.

Solar eclipse series sets from 2083 to 2087
Descending node			Ascending node		
Saros	Map	Gamma	Saros	Map	Gamma
118	July 15, 2083 Partial	1.5465	123	January 7, 2084 Partial	−1.0715
128	July 3, 2084 Annular	0.8208	133	December 27, 2084 Total	−0.4094
138	June 22, 2085 Annular	0.0452	143	December 16, 2085 Annular	0.2786
148	June 11, 2086 Total	−0.7215	153	December 6, 2086 Partial	1.0194
158	June 1, 2087 Partial	−1.4186			

=== Saros 128 ===
This eclipse is a part of Saros series 128, repeating every 18 years, 11 days, and containing 73 events. The series started with a partial solar eclipse on August 29, 984 AD. It contains total eclipses from May 16, 1417 through June 18, 1471; hybrid eclipses from June 28, 1489 through July 31, 1543; and annular eclipses from August 11, 1561 through July 25, 2120. The series ends at member 73 as a partial eclipse on November 1, 2282. Its eclipses are tabulated in three columns; every third eclipse in the same column is one exeligmos apart, so they all cast shadows over approximately the same parts of the Earth.

The longest duration of totality was produced by member 27 at 1 minutes, 45 seconds on June 7, 1453, and the longest duration of annularity was produced by member 48 at 8 minutes, 35 seconds on February 1, 1832. All eclipses in this series occur at the Moon’s descending node of orbit.

Series members 47–68 occur between 1801 and 2200:
47	48	49
January 21, 1814	February 1, 1832	February 12, 1850
50	51	52
February 23, 1868	March 5, 1886	March 17, 1904
53	54	55
March 28, 1922	April 7, 1940	April 19, 1958
56	57	58
April 29, 1976	May 10, 1994	May 20, 2012
59	60	61
June 1, 2030	June 11, 2048	June 22, 2066
62	63	64
July 3, 2084	July 15, 2102	July 25, 2120
65	66	67
August 5, 2138	August 16, 2156	August 27, 2174
68
September 6, 2192

=== Metonic series ===
The metonic series repeats eclipses every 19 years (6939.69 days), lasting about 5 cycles. Eclipses occur in nearly the same calendar date. In addition, the octon subseries repeats 1/5 of that or every 3.8 years (1387.94 days). All eclipses in this table occur at the Moon's descending node.

22 eclipse events between July 3, 2065 and November 26, 2152
July 3–4	April 21–23	February 7–8	November 26–27	September 13–15
118	120	122	124	126
July 3, 2065	April 21, 2069	February 7, 2073	November 26, 2076	September 13, 2080
128	130	132	134	136
July 3, 2084	April 21, 2088	February 7, 2092	November 27, 2095	September 14, 2099
138	140	142	144	146
July 4, 2103	April 23, 2107	February 8, 2111	November 27, 2114	September 15, 2118
148	150	152	154	156
July 4, 2122	April 22, 2126	February 8, 2130	November 26, 2133	September 15, 2137
158	160	162	164	
July 3, 2141			November 26, 2152	

=== Tritos series ===
This eclipse is a part of a tritos cycle, repeating at alternating nodes every 135 synodic months (≈ 3986.63 days, or 11 years minus 1 month). Their appearance and longitude are irregular due to a lack of synchronization with the anomalistic month (period of perigee), but groupings of 3 tritos cycles (≈ 33 years minus 3 months) come close (≈ 434.044 anomalistic months), so eclipses are similar in these groupings.

Series members between 1866 and 2200
March 16, 1866 (Saros 108)			December 13, 1898 (Saros 111)	
	September 12, 1931 (Saros 114)	August 12, 1942 (Saros 115)	July 11, 1953 (Saros 116)	June 10, 1964 (Saros 117)
May 11, 1975 (Saros 118)	April 9, 1986 (Saros 119)	March 9, 1997 (Saros 120)	February 7, 2008 (Saros 121)	January 6, 2019 (Saros 122)
December 5, 2029 (Saros 123)	November 4, 2040 (Saros 124)	October 4, 2051 (Saros 125)	September 3, 2062 (Saros 126)	August 3, 2073 (Saros 127)
July 3, 2084 (Saros 128)	June 2, 2095 (Saros 129)	May 3, 2106 (Saros 130)	April 2, 2117 (Saros 131)	March 1, 2128 (Saros 132)
January 30, 2139 (Saros 133)	December 30, 2149 (Saros 134)	November 27, 2160 (Saros 135)	October 29, 2171 (Saros 136)	September 27, 2182 (Saros 137)
August 26, 2193 (Saros 138)

=== Inex series ===
This eclipse is a part of the long period inex cycle, repeating at alternating nodes, every 358 synodic months (≈ 10,571.95 days, or 29 years minus 20 days). Their appearance and longitude are irregular due to a lack of synchronization with the anomalistic month (period of perigee). However, groupings of 3 inex cycles (≈ 87 years minus 2 months) comes close (≈ 1,151.02 anomalistic months), so eclipses are similar in these groupings.

Series members between 1801 and 2200
January 1, 1824 (Saros 119)	December 11, 1852 (Saros 120)	November 21, 1881 (Saros 121)
November 2, 1910 (Saros 122)	October 12, 1939 (Saros 123)	September 22, 1968 (Saros 124)
September 2, 1997 (Saros 125)	August 12, 2026 (Saros 126)	July 24, 2055 (Saros 127)
July 3, 2084 (Saros 128)	June 13, 2113 (Saros 129)	May 25, 2142 (Saros 130)
May 5, 2171 (Saros 131)	April 14, 2200 (Saros 132)	
