= Solar eclipse of August 15, 2091 =

Total eclipse

- Total eclipse
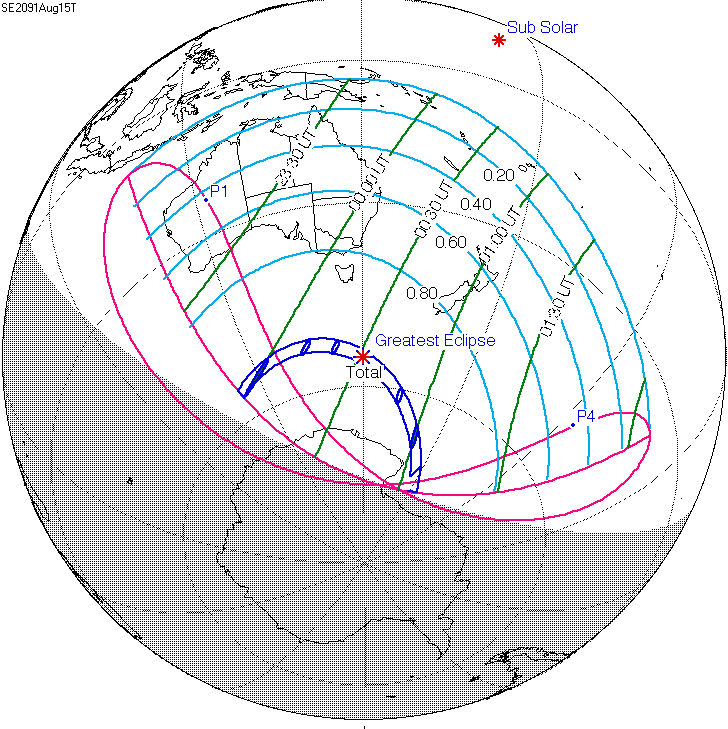
- Map
- Gamma: −0.949
- Magnitude: 1.0216

Maximum eclipse
- Duration: 98 s (1 min 38 s)
- Coordinates: 55.6°S 150.5°E
- Max. width of band: 236 km (147 mi)

Times (UTC)
- Greatest eclipse: 0:34:43

References
- Saros: 127 (62 of 82)
- Catalog # (SE5000): 9713

A total solar eclipse will occur at the Moon's ascending node of orbit between Tuesday, August 14 and Wednesday, August 15, 2091, with a magnitude of 1.0216. A solar eclipse occurs when the Moon passes between Earth and the Sun, thereby totally or partly obscuring the image of the Sun for a viewer on Earth. A total solar eclipse occurs when the Moon's apparent diameter is larger than the Sun's, blocking all direct sunlight, turning day into darkness. Totality occurs in a narrow path across Earth's surface, with the partial solar eclipse visible over a surrounding region thousands of kilometres wide. Occurring about 3.3 days before perigee (on August 18, 2091, at 7:15 UTC), the Moon's apparent diameter will be larger.

While the path of totality will not be visible from any landmasses, a partial solar eclipse will be visible for parts of Australia, Oceania, and Antarctica. This will be the last of 42 umbral eclipses of Solar Saros 127.

== Eclipse details ==
Shown below are two tables displaying details about this particular solar eclipse. The first table outlines times at which the Moon's penumbra or umbra attains the specific parameter, and the second table describes various other parameters pertaining to this eclipse.

August 15, 2091 Solar Eclipse Times
Event	Time (UTC)
First Penumbral External Contact	2091 August 14 at 22:24:15.1 UTC
First Umbral External Contact	2091 August 15 at 00:00:09.8 UTC
First Central Line	2091 August 15 at 00:01:38.3 UTC
First Umbral Internal Contact	2091 August 15 at 00:03:10.7 UTC
Ecliptic Conjunction	2091 August 15 at 00:24:41.8 UTC
Greatest Eclipse	2091 August 15 at 00:34:42.9 UTC
Greatest Duration	2091 August 15 at 00:35:13.8 UTC
Equatorial Conjunction	2091 August 15 at 00:58:54.8 UTC
Last Umbral Internal Contact	2091 August 15 at 01:05:55.1 UTC
Last Central Line	2091 August 15 at 01:07:30.0 UTC
Last Umbral External Contact	2091 August 15 at 01:09:01.1 UTC
Last Penumbral External Contact	2091 August 15 at 02:44:54.6 UTC

August 15, 2091 Solar Eclipse Parameters
Parameter	Value
Eclipse Magnitude	1.02156
Eclipse Obscuration	1.04358
Gamma	−0.94897
Sun Right Ascension	09h39m24.9s
Sun Declination	+14°00'16.0"
Sun Semi-Diameter	15'47.2"
Sun Equatorial Horizontal Parallax	08.7"
Moon Right Ascension	09h38m32.0s
Moon Declination	+13°05'59.9"
Moon Semi-Diameter	16'03.2"
Moon Equatorial Horizontal Parallax	0°58'54.9"
ΔT	115.6 s

== Eclipse season ==
This eclipse is part of an eclipse season, a period, roughly every six months, when eclipses occur. Only two (or occasionally three) eclipse seasons occur each year, and each season lasts about 35 days and repeats just short of six months (173 days) later; thus two full eclipse seasons always occur each year. Either two or three eclipses happen each eclipse season. In the sequence below, each eclipse is separated by a fortnight.

Eclipse season of August 2091
August 15 Ascending node (new moon)	August 29 Descending node (full moon)
Total solar eclipse Solar Saros 127	Total lunar eclipse Lunar Saros 139

== Related eclipses ==
=== Eclipses in 2091 ===
- A partial solar eclipse on February 18.
- A total lunar eclipse on March 5.
- A total solar eclipse on August 15.
- A total lunar eclipse on August 29.

=== Metonic ===
- Preceded by: Solar eclipse of October 26, 2087
- Followed by: Solar eclipse of June 2, 2095

=== Tzolkinex ===
- Preceded by: Solar eclipse of July 3, 2084
- Followed by: Solar eclipse of September 25, 2098

=== Half-Saros ===
- Preceded by: Lunar eclipse of August 8, 2082
- Followed by: Lunar eclipse of August 19, 2100

=== Tritos ===
- Preceded by: Solar eclipse of September 13, 2080
- Followed by: Solar eclipse of July 15, 2102

=== Solar Saros 127 ===
- Preceded by: Solar eclipse of August 3, 2073
- Followed by: Solar eclipse of August 26, 2109

=== Inex ===
- Preceded by: Solar eclipse of September 3, 2062
- Followed by: Solar eclipse of July 25, 2120

=== Triad ===
- Preceded by: Solar eclipse of October 14, 2004
- Followed by: Solar eclipse of June 16, 2178

=== Solar eclipses of 2091–2094 ===
This eclipse is a member of a semester series. An eclipse in a semester series of solar eclipses repeats approximately every 177 days and 4 hours (a semester) at alternating nodes of the Moon's orbit.

The partial solar eclipses on June 13, 2094 and December 7, 2094 occur in the next lunar year eclipse set.

Solar eclipse series sets from 2091 to 2094
Descending node			Ascending node		
Saros	Map	Gamma	Saros	Map	Gamma
122	February 18, 2091 Partial	1.1779	127	August 15, 2091 Total	−0.949
132	February 7, 2092 Annular	0.4322	137	August 3, 2092 Annular	−0.2044
142	January 27, 2093 Total	−0.2737	147	July 23, 2093 Annular	0.5717
152	January 16, 2094 Total	−0.9333	157	July 12, 2094 Partial	1.3150

=== Saros 127 ===
This eclipse is a part of Saros series 127, repeating every 18 years, 11 days, and containing 82 events. The series started with a partial solar eclipse on October 10, 991 AD. It contains total eclipses from May 14, 1352 through August 15, 2091. There are no annular or hybrid eclipses in this set. The series ends at member 82 as a partial eclipse on March 21, 2452. Its eclipses are tabulated in three columns; every third eclipse in the same column is one exeligmos apart, so they all cast shadows over approximately the same parts of the Earth.

The longest duration of totality was produced by member 31 at 5 minutes, 40 seconds on August 30, 1532. All eclipses in this series occur at the Moon’s ascending node of orbit.

Series members 46–68 occur between 1801 and 2200:
46	47	48
February 21, 1803	March 4, 1821	March 15, 1839
49	50	51
March 25, 1857	April 6, 1875	April 16, 1893
52	53	54
April 28, 1911	May 9, 1929	May 20, 1947
55	56	57
May 30, 1965	June 11, 1983	June 21, 2001
58	59	60
July 2, 2019	July 13, 2037	July 24, 2055
61	62	63
August 3, 2073	August 15, 2091	August 26, 2109
64	65	66
September 6, 2127	September 16, 2145	September 28, 2163
67	68	
October 8, 2181	October 19, 2199	

=== Metonic series ===
The metonic series repeats eclipses every 19 years (6939.69 days), lasting about 5 cycles. Eclipses occur in nearly the same calendar date. In addition, the octon subseries repeats 1/5 of that or every 3.8 years (1387.94 days). All eclipses in this table occur at the Moon's ascending node.

22 eclipse events between June 1, 2076 and October 27, 2163
June 1–3	March 21–22	January 7–8	October 26–27	August 14–15
119	121	123	125	127
June 1, 2076	March 21, 2080	January 7, 2084	October 26, 2087	August 15, 2091
129	131	133	135	137
June 2, 2095	March 21, 2099	January 8, 2103	October 26, 2106	August 15, 2110
139	141	143	145	147
June 3, 2114	March 22, 2118	January 8, 2122	October 26, 2125	August 15, 2129
149	151	153	155	157
June 3, 2133	March 21, 2137	January 8, 2141	October 26, 2144	August 14, 2148
159	161	163	165	
June 3, 2152			October 27, 2163	

=== Tritos series ===
This eclipse is a part of a tritos cycle, repeating at alternating nodes every 135 synodic months (≈ 3986.63 days, or 11 years minus 1 month). Their appearance and longitude are irregular due to a lack of synchronization with the anomalistic month (period of perigee), but groupings of 3 tritos cycles (≈ 33 years minus 3 months) come close (≈ 434.044 anomalistic months), so eclipses are similar in these groupings.

The partial solar eclipses on March 27, 1884 (part of Saros 108) and December 24, 1916 (part of Saros 111) are also a part of this series but are not included in the table below.

Series members between 1971 and 2200
July 22, 1971 (Saros 116)	June 21, 1982 (Saros 117)	May 21, 1993 (Saros 118)	April 19, 2004 (Saros 119)	March 20, 2015 (Saros 120)
February 17, 2026 (Saros 121)	January 16, 2037 (Saros 122)	December 16, 2047 (Saros 123)	November 16, 2058 (Saros 124)	October 15, 2069 (Saros 125)
September 13, 2080 (Saros 126)	August 15, 2091 (Saros 127)	July 15, 2102 (Saros 128)	June 13, 2113 (Saros 129)	May 14, 2124 (Saros 130)
April 13, 2135 (Saros 131)	March 12, 2146 (Saros 132)	February 9, 2157 (Saros 133)	January 10, 2168 (Saros 134)	December 9, 2178 (Saros 135)
November 8, 2189 (Saros 136)	October 9, 2200 (Saros 137)			

=== Inex series ===
This eclipse is a part of the long period inex cycle, repeating at alternating nodes, every 358 synodic months (≈ 10,571.95 days, or 29 years minus 20 days). Their appearance and longitude are irregular due to a lack of synchronization with the anomalistic month (period of perigee). However, groupings of 3 inex cycles (≈ 87 years minus 2 months) comes close (≈ 1,151.02 anomalistic months), so eclipses are similar in these groupings.

Series members between 1801 and 2200
March 4, 1802 (Saros 117)	February 12, 1831 (Saros 118)	January 23, 1860 (Saros 119)
January 1, 1889 (Saros 120)	December 14, 1917 (Saros 121)	November 23, 1946 (Saros 122)
November 3, 1975 (Saros 123)	October 14, 2004 (Saros 124)	September 23, 2033 (Saros 125)
September 3, 2062 (Saros 126)	August 15, 2091 (Saros 127)	July 25, 2120 (Saros 128)
July 5, 2149 (Saros 129)	June 16, 2178 (Saros 130)	
