= Solar eclipse of March 10, 2081 =

Future annular solar eclipse

- Annular eclipse
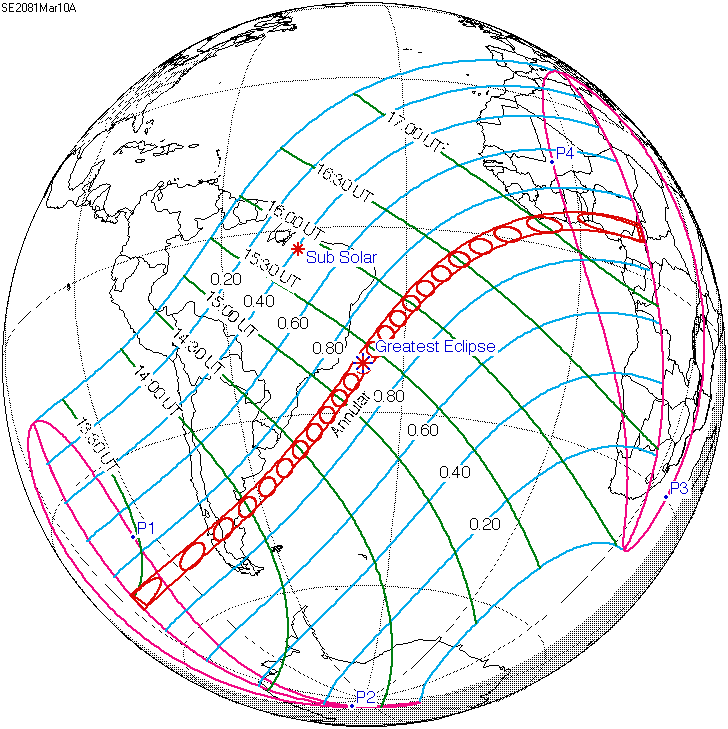
- Map
- Gamma: −0.3653
- Magnitude: 0.9304

Maximum eclipse
- Duration: 456 s (7 min 36 s)
- Coordinates: 22.4°S 36.7°W
- Max. width of band: 277 km (172 mi)

Times (UTC)
- Greatest eclipse: 15:23:31

References
- Saros: 131 (54 of 70)
- Catalog # (SE5000): 9689

An annular solar eclipse will occur at the Moon's ascending node of orbit on Monday, March 10, 2081, with a magnitude of 0.9304. A solar eclipse occurs when the Moon passes between Earth and the Sun, thereby totally or partly obscuring the image of the Sun for a viewer on Earth. An annular solar eclipse occurs when the Moon's apparent diameter is smaller than the Sun's, blocking most of the Sun's light and causing the Sun to look like an annulus (ring). An annular eclipse appears as a partial eclipse over a region of the Earth thousands of kilometres wide. Occurring about 2.3 days after apogee (on March 8, 2081, at 6:10 UTC), the Moon's apparent diameter will be smaller.

The path of annularity will be visible from parts of Chile, Argentina, southeastern Liberia, southern Côte d'Ivoire, Ghana, Togo, Benin, Nigeria, Cameroon, and the western Central African Republic. A partial solar eclipse will also be visible for parts of South America, Antarctica, Africa, and Southern Europe.

== Eclipse details ==
Shown below are two tables displaying details about this particular solar eclipse. The first table outlines times at which the Moon's penumbra or umbra attains the specific parameter, and the second table describes various other parameters pertaining to this eclipse.

March 10, 2081 Solar Eclipse Times
Event	Time (UTC)
First Penumbral External Contact	2081 March 10 at 12:22:46.4 UTC
First Umbral External Contact	2081 March 10 at 13:30:23.7 UTC
First Central Line	2081 March 10 at 13:33:33.4 UTC
First Umbral Internal Contact	2081 March 10 at 13:36:43.7 UTC
First Penumbral Internal Contact	2081 March 10 at 14:57:39.7 UTC
Equatorial Conjunction	2081 March 10 at 14:59:36.9 UTC
Greatest Duration	2081 March 10 at 15:14:48.8 UTC
Ecliptic Conjunction	2081 March 10 at 15:19:08.3 UTC
Greatest Eclipse	2081 March 10 at 15:23:30.7 UTC
Last Penumbral Internal Contact	2081 March 10 at 15:49:56.8 UTC
Last Umbral Internal Contact	2081 March 10 at 17:10:33.8 UTC
Last Central Line	2081 March 10 at 17:13:42.3 UTC
Last Umbral External Contact	2081 March 10 at 17:16:50.1 UTC
Last Penumbral External Contact	2081 March 10 at 18:24:21.0 UTC

March 10, 2081 Solar Eclipse Parameters
Parameter	Value
Eclipse Magnitude	0.93039
Eclipse Obscuration	0.86563
Gamma	−0.36528
Sun Right Ascension	23h25m55.3s
Sun Declination	-03°40'25.8"
Sun Semi-Diameter	16'06.3"
Sun Equatorial Horizontal Parallax	08.9"
Moon Right Ascension	23h26m33.6s
Moon Declination	-03°57'43.0"
Moon Semi-Diameter	14'46.5"
Moon Equatorial Horizontal Parallax	0°54'13.5"
ΔT	106.4 s

== Eclipse season ==
This eclipse is part of an eclipse season, a period, roughly every six months, when eclipses occur. Only two (or occasionally three) eclipse seasons occur each year, and each season lasts about 35 days and repeats just short of six months (173 days) later; thus two full eclipse seasons always occur each year. Either two or three eclipses happen each eclipse season. In the sequence below, each eclipse is separated by a fortnight.

Eclipse season of March 2081
March 10 Ascending node (new moon)	March 25 Descending node (full moon)
Annular solar eclipse Solar Saros 131	Partial lunar eclipse Lunar Saros 143

== Related eclipses ==
=== Eclipses in 2081 ===
- An annular solar eclipse on March 10.
- A partial lunar eclipse on March 25.
- A total solar eclipse on September 3.
- A penumbral lunar eclipse on September 18.

=== Metonic ===
- Preceded by: Solar eclipse of May 22, 2077
- Followed by: Solar eclipse of December 27, 2084

=== Tzolkinex ===
- Preceded by: Solar eclipse of January 27, 2074
- Followed by: Solar eclipse of April 21, 2088

=== Half-Saros ===
- Preceded by: Lunar eclipse of March 4, 2072
- Followed by: Lunar eclipse of March 15, 2090

=== Tritos ===
- Preceded by: Solar eclipse of April 11, 2070
- Followed by: Solar eclipse of February 7, 2092

=== Solar Saros 131 ===
- Preceded by: Solar eclipse of February 28, 2063
- Followed by: Solar eclipse of March 21, 2099

=== Inex ===
- Preceded by: Solar eclipse of March 30, 2052
- Followed by: Solar eclipse of February 18, 2110

=== Triad ===
- Preceded by: Solar eclipse of May 10, 1994
- Followed by: Solar eclipse of January 10, 2168

=== Solar eclipses of 2080–2083 ===
This eclipse is a member of a semester series. An eclipse in a semester series of solar eclipses repeats approximately every 177 days and 4 hours (a semester) at alternating nodes of the Moon's orbit.

The partial solar eclipse on July 15, 2083 occurs in the next lunar year eclipse set.

Solar eclipse series sets from 2080 to 2083
Ascending node			Descending node		
Saros	Map	Gamma	Saros	Map	Gamma
121	March 21, 2080 Partial	−1.0578	126	September 13, 2080 Partial	1.0723
131	March 10, 2081 Annular	−0.3653	136	September 3, 2081 Total	0.3378
141	February 27, 2082 Annular	0.3361	146	August 24, 2082 Total	−0.4004
151	February 16, 2083 Partial	1.017	156	August 13, 2083 Partial	−1.2064

=== Saros 131 ===
This eclipse is a part of Saros series 131, repeating every 18 years, 11 days, and containing 70 events. The series started with a partial solar eclipse on August 1, 1125. It contains total eclipses from March 27, 1522 through May 30, 1612; hybrid eclipses from June 10, 1630 through July 24, 1702; and annular eclipses from August 4, 1720 through June 18, 2243. The series ends at member 70 as a partial eclipse on September 2, 2369. Its eclipses are tabulated in three columns; every third eclipse in the same column is one exeligmos apart, so they all cast shadows over approximately the same parts of the Earth.

The longest duration of totality was produced by member 28 at 58 seconds on May 30, 1612, and the longest duration of annularity was produced by member 50 at 7 minutes, 54 seconds on January 26, 2009. All eclipses in this series occur at the Moon’s ascending node of orbit.

Series members 39–60 occur between 1801 and 2200:
39	40	41
September 28, 1810	October 9, 1828	October 20, 1846
42	43	44
October 30, 1864	November 10, 1882	November 22, 1900
45	46	47
December 3, 1918	December 13, 1936	December 25, 1954
48	49	50
January 4, 1973	January 15, 1991	January 26, 2009
51	52	53
February 6, 2027	February 16, 2045	February 28, 2063
54	55	56
March 10, 2081	March 21, 2099	April 2, 2117
57	58	59
April 13, 2135	April 23, 2153	May 5, 2171
60
May 15, 2189

=== Metonic series ===
The metonic series repeats eclipses every 19 years (6939.69 days), lasting about 5 cycles. Eclipses occur in nearly the same calendar date. In addition, the octon subseries repeats 1/5 of that or every 3.8 years (1387.94 days). All eclipses in this table occur at the Moon's ascending node.

23 eclipse events between August 3, 2054 and October 16, 2145
August 3–4	May 22–24	March 10–11	December 27–29	October 14–16
117	119	121	123	125
August 3, 2054	May 22, 2058	March 11, 2062	December 27, 2065	October 15, 2069
127	129	131	133	135
August 3, 2073	May 22, 2077	March 10, 2081	December 27, 2084	October 14, 2088
137	139	141	143	145
August 3, 2092	May 22, 2096	March 10, 2100	December 29, 2103	October 16, 2107
147	149	151	153	155
August 4, 2111	May 24, 2115	March 11, 2119	December 28, 2122	October 16, 2126
157	159	161	163	165
August 4, 2130	May 23, 2134			October 16, 2145

=== Tritos series ===
This eclipse is a part of a tritos cycle, repeating at alternating nodes every 135 synodic months (≈ 3986.63 days, or 11 years minus 1 month). Their appearance and longitude are irregular due to a lack of synchronization with the anomalistic month (period of perigee), but groupings of 3 tritos cycles (≈ 33 years minus 3 months) come close (≈ 434.044 anomalistic months), so eclipses are similar in these groupings.

Series members between 1801 and 2200
March 25, 1819 (Saros 107)	February 23, 1830 (Saros 108)	January 22, 1841 (Saros 109)		November 21, 1862 (Saros 111)
		August 20, 1895 (Saros 114)	July 21, 1906 (Saros 115)	June 19, 1917 (Saros 116)
May 19, 1928 (Saros 117)	April 19, 1939 (Saros 118)	March 18, 1950 (Saros 119)	February 15, 1961 (Saros 120)	January 16, 1972 (Saros 121)
December 15, 1982 (Saros 122)	November 13, 1993 (Saros 123)	October 14, 2004 (Saros 124)	September 13, 2015 (Saros 125)	August 12, 2026 (Saros 126)
July 13, 2037 (Saros 127)	June 11, 2048 (Saros 128)	May 11, 2059 (Saros 129)	April 11, 2070 (Saros 130)	March 10, 2081 (Saros 131)
February 7, 2092 (Saros 132)	January 8, 2103 (Saros 133)	December 8, 2113 (Saros 134)	November 6, 2124 (Saros 135)	October 7, 2135 (Saros 136)
September 6, 2146 (Saros 137)	August 5, 2157 (Saros 138)	July 5, 2168 (Saros 139)	June 5, 2179 (Saros 140)	May 4, 2190 (Saros 141)

=== Inex series ===
This eclipse is a part of the long period inex cycle, repeating at alternating nodes, every 358 synodic months (≈ 10,571.95 days, or 29 years minus 20 days). Their appearance and longitude are irregular due to a lack of synchronization with the anomalistic month (period of perigee). However, groupings of 3 inex cycles (≈ 87 years minus 2 months) comes close (≈ 1,151.02 anomalistic months), so eclipses are similar in these groupings.

Series members between 1801 and 2200
September 7, 1820 (Saros 122)	August 18, 1849 (Saros 123)	July 29, 1878 (Saros 124)
July 10, 1907 (Saros 125)	June 19, 1936 (Saros 126)	May 30, 1965 (Saros 127)
May 10, 1994 (Saros 128)	April 20, 2023 (Saros 129)	March 30, 2052 (Saros 130)
March 10, 2081 (Saros 131)	February 18, 2110 (Saros 132)	January 30, 2139 (Saros 133)
January 10, 2168 (Saros 134)	December 19, 2196 (Saros 135)	
