= Solar eclipse of October 4, 2070 =

Future annular solar eclipse

- Annular eclipse
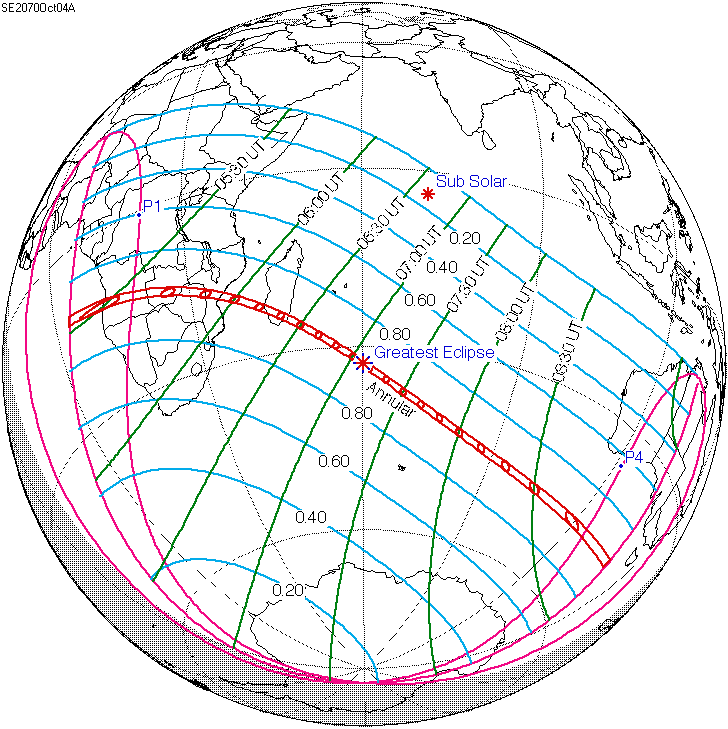
- Map
- Gamma: −0.495
- Magnitude: 0.9731

Maximum eclipse
- Duration: 164 s (2 min 44 s)
- Coordinates: 32.8°S 60.4°E
- Max. width of band: 110 km (68 mi)

Times (UTC)
- Greatest eclipse: 7:08:57

References
- Saros: 135 (42 of 71)
- Catalog # (SE5000): 9666

An annular solar eclipse will occur at the Moon's ascending node of orbit on Saturday, October 4, 2070, with a magnitude of 0.9731. A solar eclipse occurs when the Moon passes between Earth and the Sun, thereby totally or partly obscuring the image of the Sun for a viewer on Earth. An annular solar eclipse occurs when the Moon's apparent diameter is smaller than the Sun's, blocking most of the Sun's light and causing the Sun to look like an annulus (ring). An annular eclipse appears as a partial eclipse over a region of the Earth thousands of kilometres wide. Occurring about 6.1 days before apogee (on October 10, 2070, at 8:45 UTC), the Moon's apparent diameter will be smaller.

The path of annularity will be visible from parts of Angola, Zambia, Zimbabwe, Mozambique, and Madagascar. A partial solar eclipse will also be visible for parts of Central Africa, Southern Africa, East Africa, Antarctica, and Australia.

== Eclipse details ==
Shown below are two tables displaying details about this particular solar eclipse. The first table outlines times at which the Moon's penumbra or umbra attains the specific parameter, and the second table describes various other parameters pertaining to this eclipse.

October 4, 2070 Solar Eclipse Times
Event	Time (UTC)
First Penumbral External Contact	2070 October 4 at 04:21:51.1 UTC
First Umbral External Contact	2070 October 4 at 05:29:10.0 UTC
First Central Line	2070 October 4 at 05:30:38.6 UTC
First Umbral Internal Contact	2070 October 4 at 05:32:07.7 UTC
Ecliptic Conjunction	2070 October 4 at 07:03:22.7 UTC
Greatest Eclipse	2070 October 4 at 07:08:56.8 UTC
Equatorial Conjunction	2070 October 4 at 07:26:25.7 UTC
Greatest Duration	2070 October 4 at 07:44:44.1 UTC
Last Umbral Internal Contact	2070 October 4 at 08:45:30.7 UTC
Last Central Line	2070 October 4 at 08:47:02.9 UTC
Last Umbral External Contact	2070 October 4 at 08:48:34.7 UTC
Last Penumbral External Contact	2070 October 4 at 09:56:00.9 UTC

October 4, 2070 Solar Eclipse Parameters
Parameter	Value
Eclipse Magnitude	0.97311
Eclipse Obscuration	0.94694
Gamma	−0.49496
Sun Right Ascension	12h42m00.6s
Sun Declination	-04°30'57.6"
Sun Semi-Diameter	15'59.1"
Sun Equatorial Horizontal Parallax	08.8"
Moon Right Ascension	12h41m27.3s
Moon Declination	-04°57'29.9"
Moon Semi-Diameter	15'20.7"
Moon Equatorial Horizontal Parallax	0°56'19.0"
ΔT	98.1 s

== Eclipse season ==
This eclipse is part of an eclipse season, a period, roughly every six months, when eclipses occur. Only two (or occasionally three) eclipse seasons occur each year, and each season lasts about 35 days and repeats just short of six months (173 days) later; thus two full eclipse seasons always occur each year. Either two or three eclipses happen each eclipse season. In the sequence below, each eclipse is separated by a fortnight.

Eclipse season of October 2070
October 4 Ascending node (new moon)	October 19 Descending node (full moon)
Annular solar eclipse Solar Saros 135	Partial lunar eclipse Lunar Saros 147

== Related eclipses ==
=== Eclipses in 2070 ===
- A total solar eclipse on April 11.
- A penumbral lunar eclipse on April 25.
- An annular solar eclipse on October 4.
- A partial lunar eclipse on October 19.

=== Metonic ===
- Preceded by: Solar eclipse of December 17, 2066
- Followed by: Solar eclipse of July 24, 2074

=== Tzolkinex ===
- Preceded by: Solar eclipse of August 24, 2063
- Followed by: Solar eclipse of November 15, 2077

=== Half-Saros ===
- Preceded by: Lunar eclipse of September 29, 2061
- Followed by: Lunar eclipse of October 10, 2079

=== Tritos ===
- Preceded by: Solar eclipse of November 5, 2059
- Followed by: Solar eclipse of September 3, 2081

=== Solar Saros 135 ===
- Preceded by: Solar eclipse of September 22, 2052
- Followed by: Solar eclipse of October 14, 2088

=== Inex ===
- Preceded by: Solar eclipse of October 25, 2041
- Followed by: Solar eclipse of September 14, 2099

=== Triad ===
- Preceded by: Solar eclipse of December 4, 1983
- Followed by: Solar eclipse of August 5, 2157

=== Solar eclipses of 2069–2072 ===
This eclipse is a member of a semester series. An eclipse in a semester series of solar eclipses repeats approximately every 177 days and 4 hours (a semester) at alternating nodes of the Moon's orbit.

The partial solar eclipse on May 20, 2069 occurs in the previous lunar year eclipse set.

Solar eclipse series sets from 2069 to 2072
Descending node			Ascending node		
Saros	Map	Gamma	Saros	Map	Gamma
120	April 21, 2069 Partial	1.0624	125	October 15, 2069 Partial	−1.2524
130	April 11, 2070 Total	0.3652	135	October 4, 2070 Annular	−0.495
140	March 31, 2071 Annular	−0.3739	145	September 23, 2071 Total	0.262
150	March 19, 2072 Partial	−1.1405	155	September 12, 2072 Total	0.9655

=== Saros 135 ===
This eclipse is a part of Saros series 135, repeating every 18 years, 11 days, and containing 71 events. The series started with a partial solar eclipse on July 5, 1331. It contains annular eclipses from October 21, 1511 through February 24, 2305; hybrid eclipses on March 8, 2323 and March 18, 2341; and total eclipses from March 29, 2359 through May 22, 2449. The series ends at member 71 as a partial eclipse on August 17, 2593. Its eclipses are tabulated in three columns; every third eclipse in the same column is one exeligmos apart, so they all cast shadows over approximately the same parts of the Earth.

The longest duration of annularity was produced by member 16 at 10 minutes, 41 seconds on December 24, 1601, and the longest duration of totality will be produced by member 62 at 2 minutes, 27 seconds on May 12, 2431. All eclipses in this series occur at the Moon’s ascending node of orbit.

Series members 28–49 occur between 1801 and 2200:
28	29	30
May 5, 1818	May 15, 1836	May 26, 1854
31	32	33
June 6, 1872	June 17, 1890	June 28, 1908
34	35	36
July 9, 1926	July 20, 1944	July 31, 1962
37	38	39
August 10, 1980	August 22, 1998	September 1, 2016
40	42	42
September 12, 2034	September 22, 2052	October 4, 2070
43	44	45
October 14, 2088	October 26, 2106	November 6, 2124
46	47	48
November 17, 2142	November 27, 2160	December 9, 2178
49
December 19, 2196

=== Metonic series ===
The metonic series repeats eclipses every 19 years (6939.69 days), lasting about 5 cycles. Eclipses occur in nearly the same calendar date. In addition, the octon subseries repeats 1/5 of that or every 3.8 years (1387.94 days). All eclipses in this table occur at the Moon's ascending node.

21 eclipse events between July 23, 2036 and July 23, 2112
July 23–24	May 11	February 27–28	December 16–17	October 4–5
117	119	121	123	125
July 23, 2036	May 11, 2040	February 28, 2044	December 16, 2047	October 4, 2051
127	129	131	133	135
July 24, 2055	May 11, 2059	February 28, 2063	December 17, 2066	October 4, 2070
137	139	141	143	145
July 24, 2074	May 11, 2078	February 27, 2082	December 16, 2085	October 4, 2089
147	149	151	153	155
July 23, 2093	May 11, 2097	February 28, 2101	December 17, 2104	October 5, 2108
157
July 23, 2112

=== Tritos series ===
This eclipse is a part of a tritos cycle, repeating at alternating nodes every 135 synodic months (≈ 3986.63 days, or 11 years minus 1 month). Their appearance and longitude are irregular due to a lack of synchronization with the anomalistic month (period of perigee), but groupings of 3 tritos cycles (≈ 33 years minus 3 months) come close (≈ 434.044 anomalistic months), so eclipses are similar in these groupings.

Series members between 1801 and 2200
October 19, 1808 (Saros 111)	September 19, 1819 (Saros 112)	August 18, 1830 (Saros 113)	July 18, 1841 (Saros 114)	June 17, 1852 (Saros 115)
May 17, 1863 (Saros 116)	April 16, 1874 (Saros 117)	March 16, 1885 (Saros 118)	February 13, 1896 (Saros 119)	January 14, 1907 (Saros 120)
December 14, 1917 (Saros 121)	November 12, 1928 (Saros 122)	October 12, 1939 (Saros 123)	September 12, 1950 (Saros 124)	August 11, 1961 (Saros 125)
July 10, 1972 (Saros 126)	June 11, 1983 (Saros 127)	May 10, 1994 (Saros 128)	April 8, 2005 (Saros 129)	March 9, 2016 (Saros 130)
February 6, 2027 (Saros 131)	January 5, 2038 (Saros 132)	December 5, 2048 (Saros 133)	November 5, 2059 (Saros 134)	October 4, 2070 (Saros 135)
September 3, 2081 (Saros 136)	August 3, 2092 (Saros 137)	July 4, 2103 (Saros 138)	June 3, 2114 (Saros 139)	May 3, 2125 (Saros 140)
April 1, 2136 (Saros 141)	March 2, 2147 (Saros 142)	January 30, 2158 (Saros 143)	December 29, 2168 (Saros 144)	November 28, 2179 (Saros 145)
October 29, 2190 (Saros 146)

=== Inex series ===
This eclipse is a part of the long period inex cycle, repeating at alternating nodes, every 358 synodic months (≈ 10,571.95 days, or 29 years minus 20 days). Their appearance and longitude are irregular due to a lack of synchronization with the anomalistic month (period of perigee). However, groupings of 3 inex cycles (≈ 87 years minus 2 months) comes close (≈ 1,151.02 anomalistic months), so eclipses are similar in these groupings.

Series members between 1801 and 2200
April 4, 1810 (Saros 126)	March 15, 1839 (Saros 127)	February 23, 1868 (Saros 128)
February 1, 1897 (Saros 129)	January 14, 1926 (Saros 130)	December 25, 1954 (Saros 131)
December 4, 1983 (Saros 132)	November 13, 2012 (Saros 133)	October 25, 2041 (Saros 134)
October 4, 2070 (Saros 135)	September 14, 2099 (Saros 136)	August 25, 2128 (Saros 137)
August 5, 2157 (Saros 138)	July 16, 2186 (Saros 139)	
