= Solar eclipse of August 3, 2092 =

Future annular solar eclipse

- Annular eclipse
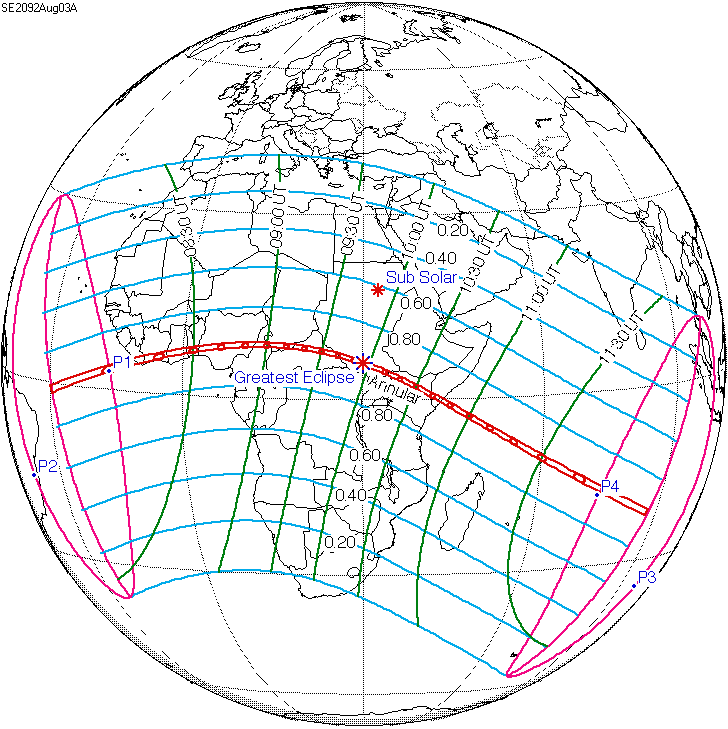
- Map
- Gamma: −0.2044
- Magnitude: 0.9794

Maximum eclipse
- Duration: 151 s (2 min 31 s)
- Coordinates: 5.6°N 30.3°E
- Max. width of band: 75 km (47 mi)

Times (UTC)
- Greatest eclipse: 9:59:33

References
- Saros: 137 (40 of 70)
- Catalog # (SE5000): 9715

An annular solar eclipse will occur at the Moon's ascending node of orbit on Sunday, August 3, 2092, with a magnitude of 0.9794. A solar eclipse occurs when the Moon passes between Earth and the Sun, thereby totally or partly obscuring the image of the Sun for a viewer on Earth. An annular solar eclipse occurs when the Moon's apparent diameter is smaller than the Sun's, blocking most of the Sun's light and causing the Sun to look like an annulus (ring). An annular eclipse appears as a partial eclipse over a region of the Earth thousands of kilometers wide. Occurring about 5.3 days after apogee (on July 29, 2092, at 2:00 UTC), the Moon's apparent diameter will be smaller.

The path of annularity will be visible from parts of Liberia, Côte d'Ivoire, Ghana, Togo, Benin, Nigeria, Cameroon, Chad, the Central African Republic, South Sudan, Uganda, Kenya, Somalia, and the Seychelles. A partial solar eclipse will also be visible for parts of eastern Brazil, Africa, Southern Europe, the Middle East, and South Asia.

== Eclipse details ==
Shown below are two tables displaying details about this particular solar eclipse. The first table outlines times at which the Moon's penumbra or umbra attains the specific parameter, and the second table describes various other parameters pertaining to this eclipse.

August 3, 2092 Solar Eclipse Times
Event	Time (UTC)
First Penumbral External Contact	2092 August 3 at 07:03:23.5 UTC
First Umbral External Contact	2092 August 3 at 08:06:36.3 UTC
First Central Line	2092 August 3 at 08:07:48.9 UTC
First Umbral Internal Contact	2092 August 3 at 08:09:01.6 UTC
First Penumbral Internal Contact	2092 August 3 at 09:14:39.6 UTC
Greatest Duration	2092 August 3 at 09:18:10.6 UTC
Ecliptic Conjunction	2092 August 3 at 09:57:12.6 UTC
Greatest Eclipse	2092 August 3 at 09:59:32.8 UTC
Equatorial Conjunction	2092 August 3 at 10:03:51.7 UTC
Last Penumbral Internal Contact	2092 August 3 at 10:44:20.1 UTC
Last Umbral Internal Contact	2092 August 3 at 11:50:02.9 UTC
Last Central Line	2092 August 3 at 11:51:12.9 UTC
Last Umbral External Contact	2092 August 3 at 11:52:22.8 UTC
Last Penumbral External Contact	2092 August 3 at 12:55:34.2 UTC

August 3, 2092 Solar Eclipse Parameters
Parameter	Value
Eclipse Magnitude	0.97942
Eclipse Obscuration	0.95927
Gamma	−0.20443
Sun Right Ascension	08h58m14.3s
Sun Declination	+17°09'21.7"
Sun Semi-Diameter	15'45.7"
Sun Equatorial Horizontal Parallax	08.7"
Moon Right Ascension	08h58m05.6s
Moon Declination	+16°58'10.4"
Moon Semi-Diameter	15'12.2"
Moon Equatorial Horizontal Parallax	0°55'47.9"
ΔT	116.5 s

== Eclipse season ==
This eclipse is part of an eclipse season, a period, roughly every six months, when eclipses occur. Only two (or occasionally three) eclipse seasons occur each year, and each season lasts about 35 days and repeats just short of six months (173 days) later; thus two full eclipse seasons always occur each year. Either two or three eclipses happen each eclipse season. In the sequence below, each eclipse is separated by a fortnight. The first and last eclipse in this sequence is separated by one synodic month.

Eclipse season of July–August 2092
July 19 Descending node (full moon)	August 3 Ascending node (new moon)	August 17 Descending node (full moon)
Penumbral lunar eclipse Lunar Saros 111	Annular solar eclipse Solar Saros 137	Penumbral lunar eclipse Lunar Saros 149

== Related eclipses ==
=== Eclipses in 2092 ===
- An annular solar eclipse on February 7.
- A penumbral lunar eclipse on February 23.
- A penumbral lunar eclipse on July 19.
- An annular solar eclipse on August 3.
- A penumbral lunar eclipse on August 17.

=== Metonic ===
- Preceded by: Solar eclipse of October 14, 2088
- Followed by: Solar eclipse of May 22, 2096

=== Tzolkinex ===
- Preceded by: Solar eclipse of June 22, 2085
- Followed by: Solar eclipse of September 14, 2099

=== Half-Saros ===
- Preceded by: Lunar eclipse of July 29, 2083
- Followed by: Lunar eclipse of August 9, 2101

=== Tritos ===
- Preceded by: Solar eclipse of September 3, 2081
- Followed by: Solar eclipse of July 4, 2103

=== Solar Saros 137 ===
- Preceded by: Solar eclipse of July 24, 2074
- Followed by: Solar eclipse of August 15, 2110

=== Inex ===
- Preceded by: Solar eclipse of August 24, 2063
- Followed by: Solar eclipse of July 14, 2121

=== Triad ===
- Preceded by: Solar eclipse of October 3, 2005
- Followed by: Solar eclipse of June 5, 2179

=== Solar eclipses of 2091–2094 ===
This eclipse is a member of a semester series. An eclipse in a semester series of solar eclipses repeats approximately every 177 days and 4 hours (a semester) at alternating nodes of the Moon's orbit.

The partial solar eclipses on June 13, 2094 and December 7, 2094 occur in the next lunar year eclipse set.

Solar eclipse series sets from 2091 to 2094
Descending node			Ascending node		
Saros	Map	Gamma	Saros	Map	Gamma
122	February 18, 2091 Partial	1.1779	127	August 15, 2091 Total	−0.949
132	February 7, 2092 Annular	0.4322	137	August 3, 2092 Annular	−0.2044
142	January 27, 2093 Total	−0.2737	147	July 23, 2093 Annular	0.5717
152	January 16, 2094 Total	−0.9333	157	July 12, 2094 Partial	1.3150

=== Saros 137 ===
This eclipse is a part of Saros series 137, repeating every 18 years, 11 days, and containing 70 events. The series started with a partial solar eclipse on May 25, 1389. It contains total eclipses from August 20, 1533 through December 6, 1695; the first set of hybrid eclipses from December 17, 1713 through February 11, 1804; the first set of annular eclipses from February 21, 1822 through March 25, 1876; the second set of hybrid eclipses from April 6, 1894 through April 28, 1930; and the second set of annular eclipses from May 9, 1948 through April 13, 2507. The series ends at member 70 as a partial eclipse on June 28, 2633. Its eclipses are tabulated in three columns; every third eclipse in the same column is one exeligmos apart, so they all cast shadows over approximately the same parts of the Earth.

The longest duration of totality was produced by member 11 at 2 minutes, 55 seconds on September 10, 1569, and the longest duration of annularity will be produced by member 59 at 7 minutes, 5 seconds on February 28, 2435. All eclipses in this series occur at the Moon’s ascending node of orbit.

Series members 24–46 occur between 1801 and 2200:
24	25	26
February 11, 1804	February 21, 1822	March 4, 1840
27	28	29
March 15, 1858	March 25, 1876	April 6, 1894
30	31	32
April 17, 1912	April 28, 1930	May 9, 1948
33	34	35
May 20, 1966	May 30, 1984	June 10, 2002
36	37	38
June 21, 2020	July 2, 2038	July 12, 2056
39	40	41
July 24, 2074	August 3, 2092	August 15, 2110
42	43	44
August 25, 2128	September 6, 2146	September 16, 2164
45	46	
September 27, 2182	October 9, 2200	

=== Metonic series ===
The metonic series repeats eclipses every 19 years (6939.69 days), lasting about 5 cycles. Eclipses occur in nearly the same calendar date. In addition, the octon subseries repeats 1/5 of that or every 3.8 years (1387.94 days). All eclipses in this table occur at the Moon's ascending node.

23 eclipse events between August 3, 2054 and October 16, 2145
August 3–4	May 22–24	March 10–11	December 27–29	October 14–16
117	119	121	123	125
August 3, 2054	May 22, 2058	March 11, 2062	December 27, 2065	October 15, 2069
127	129	131	133	135
August 3, 2073	May 22, 2077	March 10, 2081	December 27, 2084	October 14, 2088
137	139	141	143	145
August 3, 2092	May 22, 2096	March 10, 2100	December 29, 2103	October 16, 2107
147	149	151	153	155
August 4, 2111	May 24, 2115	March 11, 2119	December 28, 2122	October 16, 2126
157	159	161	163	165
August 4, 2130	May 23, 2134			October 16, 2145

=== Tritos series ===
This eclipse is a part of a tritos cycle, repeating at alternating nodes every 135 synodic months (≈ 3986.63 days, or 11 years minus 1 month). Their appearance and longitude are irregular due to a lack of synchronization with the anomalistic month (period of perigee), but groupings of 3 tritos cycles (≈ 33 years minus 3 months) come close (≈ 434.044 anomalistic months), so eclipses are similar in these groupings.

Series members between 1801 and 2200
October 19, 1808 (Saros 111)	September 19, 1819 (Saros 112)	August 18, 1830 (Saros 113)	July 18, 1841 (Saros 114)	June 17, 1852 (Saros 115)
May 17, 1863 (Saros 116)	April 16, 1874 (Saros 117)	March 16, 1885 (Saros 118)	February 13, 1896 (Saros 119)	January 14, 1907 (Saros 120)
December 14, 1917 (Saros 121)	November 12, 1928 (Saros 122)	October 12, 1939 (Saros 123)	September 12, 1950 (Saros 124)	August 11, 1961 (Saros 125)
July 10, 1972 (Saros 126)	June 11, 1983 (Saros 127)	May 10, 1994 (Saros 128)	April 8, 2005 (Saros 129)	March 9, 2016 (Saros 130)
February 6, 2027 (Saros 131)	January 5, 2038 (Saros 132)	December 5, 2048 (Saros 133)	November 5, 2059 (Saros 134)	October 4, 2070 (Saros 135)
September 3, 2081 (Saros 136)	August 3, 2092 (Saros 137)	July 4, 2103 (Saros 138)	June 3, 2114 (Saros 139)	May 3, 2125 (Saros 140)
April 1, 2136 (Saros 141)	March 2, 2147 (Saros 142)	January 30, 2158 (Saros 143)	December 29, 2168 (Saros 144)	November 28, 2179 (Saros 145)
October 29, 2190 (Saros 146)

=== Inex series ===
This eclipse is a part of the long period inex cycle, repeating at alternating nodes, every 358 synodic months (≈ 10,571.95 days, or 29 years minus 20 days). Their appearance and longitude are irregular due to a lack of synchronization with the anomalistic month (period of perigee). However, groupings of 3 inex cycles (≈ 87 years minus 2 months) comes close (≈ 1,151.02 anomalistic months), so eclipses are similar in these groupings.

Series members between 1801 and 2200
February 21, 1803 (Saros 127)	February 1, 1832 (Saros 128)	January 11, 1861 (Saros 129)
December 22, 1889 (Saros 130)	December 3, 1918 (Saros 131)	November 12, 1947 (Saros 132)
October 23, 1976 (Saros 133)	October 3, 2005 (Saros 134)	September 12, 2034 (Saros 135)
August 24, 2063 (Saros 136)	August 3, 2092 (Saros 137)	July 14, 2121 (Saros 138)
June 25, 2150 (Saros 139)	June 5, 2179 (Saros 140)	
