= Solar eclipse of October 15, 2069 =

Future partial solar eclipse

- Partial eclipse
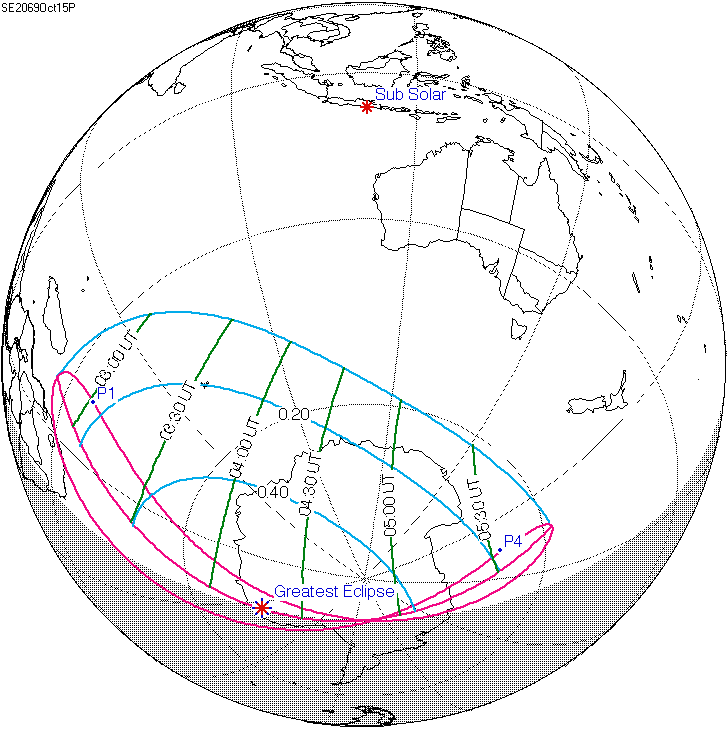
- Map
- Gamma: −1.2524
- Magnitude: 0.5298

Maximum eclipse
- Coordinates: 71.6°S 5.5°W

Times (UTC)
- Greatest eclipse: 4:19:56

References
- Saros: 125 (57 of 73)
- Catalog # (SE5000): 9664

A partial solar eclipse will occur at the Moon's ascending node of orbit on Tuesday, October 15, 2069, with a magnitude of 0.5298. A solar eclipse occurs when the Moon passes between Earth and the Sun, thereby totally or partly obscuring the image of the Sun for a viewer on Earth. A partial solar eclipse occurs in the polar regions of the Earth when the center of the Moon's shadow misses the Earth.

The partial solar eclipse will be visible for much of Antarctica.

== Eclipse details ==
Shown below are two tables displaying details about this particular solar eclipse. The first table outlines times at which the Moon's penumbra or umbra attains the specific parameter, and the second table describes various other parameters pertaining to this eclipse.

October 15, 2069 Solar Eclipse Times
Event	Time (UTC)
First Penumbral External Contact	2069 October 15 at 02:27:57.1 UTC
Ecliptic Conjunction	2069 October 15 at 04:05:21.1 UTC
Greatest Eclipse	2069 October 15 at 04:19:56.3 UTC
Equatorial Conjunction	2069 October 15 at 05:03:05.6 UTC
Last Penumbral External Contact	2069 October 15 at 06:11:37.9 UTC

October 15, 2069 Solar Eclipse Parameters
Parameter	Value
Eclipse Magnitude	0.52981
Eclipse Obscuration	0.41298
Gamma	−1.25241
Sun Right Ascension	13h22m54.2s
Sun Declination	-08°43'06.9"
Sun Semi-Diameter	16'02.2"
Sun Equatorial Horizontal Parallax	08.8"
Moon Right Ascension	13h21m37.5s
Moon Declination	-09°48'03.1"
Moon Semi-Diameter	14'45.3"
Moon Equatorial Horizontal Parallax	0°54'09.1"
ΔT	97.4 s

== Eclipse season ==
This eclipse is part of an eclipse season, a period, roughly every six months, when eclipses occur. Only two (or occasionally three) eclipse seasons occur each year, and each season lasts about 35 days and repeats just short of six months (173 days) later; thus two full eclipse seasons always occur each year. Either two or three eclipses happen each eclipse season. In the sequence below, each eclipse is separated by a fortnight.

Eclipse season of October 2069
October 15 Ascending node (new moon)	October 30 Descending node (full moon)
Partial solar eclipse Solar Saros 125	Total lunar eclipse Lunar Saros 137

== Related eclipses ==
=== Eclipses in 2069 ===
- A partial solar eclipse on April 21.
- A total lunar eclipse on May 6.
- A partial solar eclipse on May 20.
- A partial solar eclipse on October 15.
- A total lunar eclipse on October 30.

=== Metonic ===
- Preceded by: Solar eclipse of December 27, 2065
- Followed by: Solar eclipse of August 3, 2073

=== Tzolkinex ===
- Preceded by: Solar eclipse of September 3, 2062
- Followed by: Solar eclipse of November 26, 2076

=== Half-Saros ===
- Preceded by: Lunar eclipse of October 9, 2060
- Followed by: Lunar eclipse of October 21, 2078

=== Tritos ===
- Preceded by: Solar eclipse of November 16, 2058
- Followed by: Solar eclipse of September 13, 2080

=== Solar Saros 125 ===
- Preceded by: Solar eclipse of October 4, 2051
- Followed by: Solar eclipse of October 26, 2087

=== Inex ===
- Preceded by: Solar eclipse of November 4, 2040
- Followed by: Solar eclipse of September 25, 2098

=== Triad ===
- Preceded by: Solar eclipse of December 15, 1982
- Followed by: Solar eclipse of August 16, 2156

=== Solar eclipses of 2069–2072 ===
This eclipse is a member of a semester series. An eclipse in a semester series of solar eclipses repeats approximately every 177 days and 4 hours (a semester) at alternating nodes of the Moon's orbit.

The partial solar eclipse on May 20, 2069 occurs in the previous lunar year eclipse set.

Solar eclipse series sets from 2069 to 2072
Descending node			Ascending node		
Saros	Map	Gamma	Saros	Map	Gamma
120	April 21, 2069 Partial	1.0624	125	October 15, 2069 Partial	−1.2524
130	April 11, 2070 Total	0.3652	135	October 4, 2070 Annular	−0.495
140	March 31, 2071 Annular	−0.3739	145	September 23, 2071 Total	0.262
150	March 19, 2072 Partial	−1.1405	155	September 12, 2072 Total	0.9655

=== Saros 125 ===
This eclipse is a part of Saros series 125, repeating every 18 years, 11 days, and containing 73 events. The series started with a partial solar eclipse on February 4, 1060. It contains total eclipses from June 13, 1276 through July 16, 1330; hybrid eclipses on July 26, 1348 and August 7, 1366; and annular eclipses from August 17, 1384 through August 22, 1979. The series ends at member 73 as a partial eclipse on April 9, 2358. Its eclipses are tabulated in three columns; every third eclipse in the same column is one exeligmos apart, so they all cast shadows over approximately the same parts of the Earth.

The longest duration of totality was produced by member 14 at 1 minutes, 11 seconds on June 25, 1294, and the longest duration of annularity was produced by member 48 at 7 minutes, 23 seconds on July 10, 1907. All eclipses in this series occur at the Moon’s ascending node of orbit.

Series members 43–64 occur between 1801 and 2200:
43	44	45
May 16, 1817	May 27, 1835	June 6, 1853
46	47	48
June 18, 1871	June 28, 1889	July 10, 1907
49	50	51
July 20, 1925	August 1, 1943	August 11, 1961
52	53	54
August 22, 1979	September 2, 1997	September 13, 2015
55	56	57
September 23, 2033	October 4, 2051	October 15, 2069
58	59	60
October 26, 2087	November 6, 2105	November 18, 2123
61	62	63
November 28, 2141	December 9, 2159	December 20, 2177
64
December 31, 2195

=== Metonic series ===
The metonic series repeats eclipses every 19 years (6939.69 days), lasting about 5 cycles. Eclipses occur in nearly the same calendar date. In addition, the octon subseries repeats 1/5 of that or every 3.8 years (1387.94 days). All eclipses in this table occur at the Moon's ascending node.

23 eclipse events between August 3, 2054 and October 16, 2145
August 3–4	May 22–24	March 10–11	December 27–29	October 14–16
117	119	121	123	125
August 3, 2054	May 22, 2058	March 11, 2062	December 27, 2065	October 15, 2069
127	129	131	133	135
August 3, 2073	May 22, 2077	March 10, 2081	December 27, 2084	October 14, 2088
137	139	141	143	145
August 3, 2092	May 22, 2096	March 10, 2100	December 29, 2103	October 16, 2107
147	149	151	153	155
August 4, 2111	May 24, 2115	March 11, 2119	December 28, 2122	October 16, 2126
157	159	161	163	165
August 4, 2130	May 23, 2134			October 16, 2145

=== Tritos series ===
This eclipse is a part of a tritos cycle, repeating at alternating nodes every 135 synodic months (≈ 3986.63 days, or 11 years minus 1 month). Their appearance and longitude are irregular due to a lack of synchronization with the anomalistic month (period of perigee), but groupings of 3 tritos cycles (≈ 33 years minus 3 months) come close (≈ 434.044 anomalistic months), so eclipses are similar in these groupings.

The partial solar eclipses on March 27, 1884 (part of Saros 108) and December 24, 1916 (part of Saros 111) are also a part of this series but are not included in the table below.

Series members between 1971 and 2200
July 22, 1971 (Saros 116)	June 21, 1982 (Saros 117)	May 21, 1993 (Saros 118)	April 19, 2004 (Saros 119)	March 20, 2015 (Saros 120)
February 17, 2026 (Saros 121)	January 16, 2037 (Saros 122)	December 16, 2047 (Saros 123)	November 16, 2058 (Saros 124)	October 15, 2069 (Saros 125)
September 13, 2080 (Saros 126)	August 15, 2091 (Saros 127)	July 15, 2102 (Saros 128)	June 13, 2113 (Saros 129)	May 14, 2124 (Saros 130)
April 13, 2135 (Saros 131)	March 12, 2146 (Saros 132)	February 9, 2157 (Saros 133)	January 10, 2168 (Saros 134)	December 9, 2178 (Saros 135)
November 8, 2189 (Saros 136)	October 9, 2200 (Saros 137)			

=== Inex series ===
This eclipse is a part of the long period inex cycle, repeating at alternating nodes, every 358 synodic months (≈ 10,571.95 days, or 29 years minus 20 days). Their appearance and longitude are irregular due to a lack of synchronization with the anomalistic month (period of perigee). However, groupings of 3 inex cycles (≈ 87 years minus 2 months) comes close (≈ 1,151.02 anomalistic months), so eclipses are similar in these groupings.

Series members between 1801 and 2200
April 14, 1809 (Saros 116)	March 25, 1838 (Saros 117)	March 6, 1867 (Saros 118)
February 13, 1896 (Saros 119)	January 24, 1925 (Saros 120)	January 5, 1954 (Saros 121)
December 15, 1982 (Saros 122)	November 25, 2011 (Saros 123)	November 4, 2040 (Saros 124)
October 15, 2069 (Saros 125)	September 25, 2098 (Saros 126)	September 6, 2127 (Saros 127)
August 16, 2156 (Saros 128)	July 26, 2185 (Saros 129)	
