= Solar eclipse of March 10, 2100 =

Future annular solar eclipse

- Annular eclipse
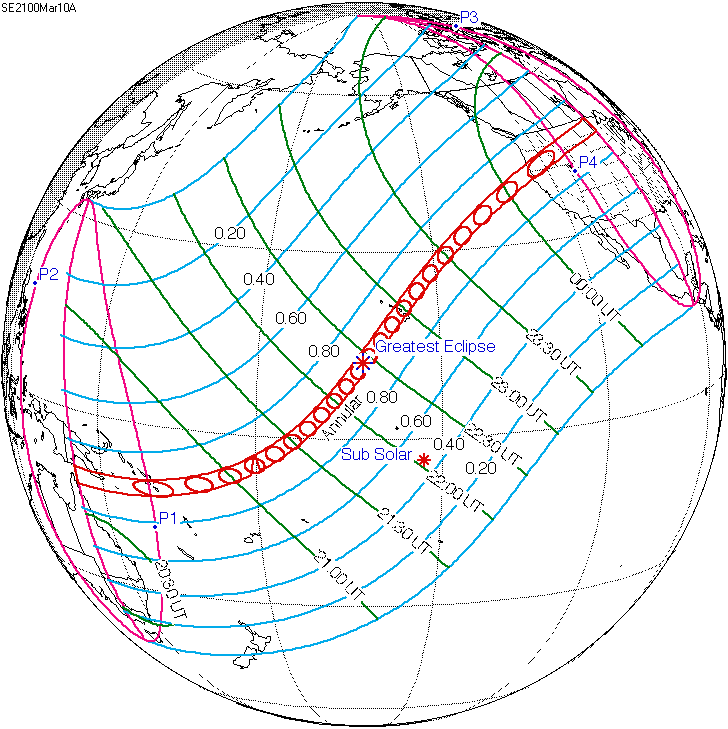
- Map
- Gamma: 0.3077
- Magnitude: 0.9338

Maximum eclipse
- Duration: 449 s (7 min 29 s)
- Coordinates: 12°N 162.4°W
- Max. width of band: 257 km (160 mi)

Times (UTC)
- Greatest eclipse: 22:28:11

References
- Saros: 141 (28 of 70)
- Catalog # (SE5000): 9733

An annular solar eclipse will occur at the Moon's ascending node of orbit between Wednesday, March 10 and Thursday, March 11, 2100, with a magnitude of 0.9338. A solar eclipse occurs when the Moon passes between Earth and the Sun, thereby totally or partly obscuring the image of the Sun for a viewer on Earth. An annular solar eclipse occurs when the Moon's apparent diameter is smaller than the Sun's, blocking most of the Sun's light and causing the Sun to look like an annulus (ring). An annular eclipse appears as a partial eclipse over a region of the Earth thousands of kilometres wide. Occurring about 2.9 days before apogee (on March 13, 2100, at 21:10 UTC), the Moon's apparent diameter will be smaller.

The path of annularity will be visible from parts of northeastern Australia, Papua New Guinea, the Solomon Islands, Tuvalu, and Hawaii, California, Oregon, northwestern Nevada, Idaho, Montana, Wyoming, North Dakota, South Dakota, and Minnesota in the United States. A partial solar eclipse will also be visible for parts of Australia, Oceania, and North America.

== Eclipse details ==
Shown below are two tables displaying details about this particular solar eclipse. The first table outlines times at which the Moon's penumbra or umbra attains the specific parameter, and the second table describes various other parameters pertaining to this eclipse.

March 10, 2100 Solar Eclipse Times
Event	Time (UTC)
First Penumbral External Contact	2100 March 10 at 19:26:43.1 UTC
First Umbral External Contact	2100 March 10 at 20:33:05.4 UTC
First Central Line	2100 March 10 at 20:36:01.0 UTC
First Umbral Internal Contact	2100 March 10 at 20:38:57.2 UTC
First Penumbral Internal Contact	2100 March 10 at 21:52:49.6 UTC
Greatest Duration	2100 March 10 at 22:21:55.8 UTC
Greatest Eclipse	2100 March 10 at 22:28:11.0 UTC
Ecliptic Conjunction	2100 March 10 at 22:31:51.0 UTC
Equatorial Conjunction	2100 March 10 at 22:48:12.9 UTC
Last Penumbral Internal Contact	2100 March 10 at 23:03:03.0 UTC
Last Umbral Internal Contact	2100 March 11 at 00:17:11.1 UTC
Last Central Line	2100 March 11 at 00:20:09.1 UTC
Last Umbral External Contact	2100 March 11 at 00:23:06.7 UTC
Last Penumbral External Contact	2100 March 11 at 01:29:34.7 UTC

March 10, 2100 Solar Eclipse Parameters
Parameter	Value
Eclipse Magnitude	0.93384
Eclipse Obscuration	0.87205
Gamma	0.30770
Sun Right Ascension	23h24m46.6s
Sun Declination	-03°47'43.4"
Sun Semi-Diameter	16'06.4"
Sun Equatorial Horizontal Parallax	08.9"
Moon Right Ascension	23h24m14.3s
Moon Declination	-03°33'06.4"
Moon Semi-Diameter	14'49.6"
Moon Equatorial Horizontal Parallax	0°54'24.7"
ΔT	123.8 s

== Eclipse season ==
This eclipse is part of an eclipse season, a period, roughly every six months, when eclipses occur. Only two (or occasionally three) eclipse seasons occur each year, and each season lasts about 35 days and repeats just short of six months (173 days) later; thus two full eclipse seasons always occur each year. Either two or three eclipses happen each eclipse season. In the sequence below, each eclipse is separated by a fortnight.

Eclipse season of February–March 2100
February 24 Descending node (full moon)	March 10 Ascending node (new moon)
Penumbral lunar eclipse Lunar Saros 115	Annular solar eclipse Solar Saros 141

== Related eclipses ==
=== Eclipses in 2100 ===
- A penumbral lunar eclipse on February 24.
- An annular solar eclipse on March 10.
- A penumbral lunar eclipse on August 19.
- A total solar eclipse on September 4.

=== Metonic ===
- Preceded by: Solar eclipse of May 22, 2096
- Followed by: Solar eclipse of December 29, 2103

=== Tzolkinex ===
- Preceded by: Solar eclipse of January 27, 2093
- Followed by: Solar eclipse of April 23, 2107

=== Half-Saros ===
- Preceded by: Lunar eclipse of March 5, 2091
- Followed by: Lunar eclipse of March 17, 2109

=== Tritos ===
- Preceded by: Solar eclipse of April 10, 2089
- Followed by: Solar eclipse of February 8, 2111

=== Solar Saros 141 ===
- Preceded by: Solar eclipse of February 27, 2082
- Followed by: Solar eclipse of March 22, 2118

=== Inex ===
- Preceded by: Solar eclipse of March 31, 2071
- Followed by: Solar eclipse of February 18, 2129

=== Triad ===
- Preceded by: Solar eclipse of May 10, 2013
- Followed by: Solar eclipse of January 9, 2187

=== Solar eclipses of 2098–2101 ===
This eclipse is a member of a semester series. An eclipse in a semester series of solar eclipses repeats approximately every 177 days and 4 hours (a semester) at alternating nodes of the Moon's orbit.

The partial solar eclipse on October 24, 2098 occurs in the previous lunar year eclipse set.

Solar eclipse series sets from 2098 to 2101
Ascending node			Descending node		
Saros	Map	Gamma	Saros	Map	Gamma
121	April 1, 2098 Partial	−1.1005	126	September 25, 2098 Partial	1.14
131	March 21, 2099 Annular	−0.4016	136	September 14, 2099 Total	0.3942
141	March 10, 2100 Annular	0.3077	146	September 4, 2100 Total	−0.3384
151	February 28, 2101 Annular	0.9964	156	August 24, 2101 Partial	−1.1392

=== Saros 141 ===
This eclipse is a part of Saros series 141, repeating every 18 years, 11 days, and containing 70 events. The series started with a partial solar eclipse on May 19, 1613. It contains annular eclipses from August 4, 1739 through October 14, 2640. There are no hybrid or total eclipses in this set. The series ends at member 70 as a partial eclipse on June 13, 2857. Its eclipses are tabulated in three columns; every third eclipse in the same column is one exeligmos apart, so they all cast shadows over approximately the same parts of the Earth.

The longest duration of annularity was produced by member 20 at 12 minutes, 9 seconds on December 14, 1955. All eclipses in this series occur at the Moon’s ascending node of orbit.

Series members 12–33 occur between 1801 and 2200:
12	13	14
September 17, 1811	September 28, 1829	October 9, 1847
15	16	17
October 19, 1865	October 30, 1883	November 11, 1901
18	19	20
November 22, 1919	December 2, 1937	December 14, 1955
21	22	23
December 24, 1973	January 4, 1992	January 15, 2010
24	25	26
January 26, 2028	February 5, 2046	February 17, 2064
27	28	29
February 27, 2082	March 10, 2100	March 22, 2118
30	31	32
April 1, 2136	April 12, 2154	April 23, 2172
33
May 4, 2190

=== Metonic series ===
The metonic series repeats eclipses every 19 years (6939.69 days), lasting about 5 cycles. Eclipses occur in nearly the same calendar date. In addition, the octon subseries repeats 1/5 of that or every 3.8 years (1387.94 days). All eclipses in this table occur at the Moon's ascending node.

23 eclipse events between August 3, 2054 and October 16, 2145
August 3–4	May 22–24	March 10–11	December 27–29	October 14–16
117	119	121	123	125
August 3, 2054	May 22, 2058	March 11, 2062	December 27, 2065	October 15, 2069
127	129	131	133	135
August 3, 2073	May 22, 2077	March 10, 2081	December 27, 2084	October 14, 2088
137	139	141	143	145
August 3, 2092	May 22, 2096	March 10, 2100	December 29, 2103	October 16, 2107
147	149	151	153	155
August 4, 2111	May 24, 2115	March 11, 2119	December 28, 2122	October 16, 2126
157	159	161	163	165
August 4, 2130	May 23, 2134			October 16, 2145

=== Tritos series ===
This eclipse is a part of a tritos cycle, repeating at alternating nodes every 135 synodic months (≈ 3986.63 days, or 11 years minus 1 month). Their appearance and longitude are irregular due to a lack of synchronization with the anomalistic month (period of perigee), but groupings of 3 tritos cycles (≈ 33 years minus 3 months) come close (≈ 434.044 anomalistic months), so eclipses are similar in these groupings.

Series members between 1801 and 2200
June 26, 1805 (Saros 114)	May 27, 1816 (Saros 115)	April 26, 1827 (Saros 116)	March 25, 1838 (Saros 117)	February 23, 1849 (Saros 118)
January 23, 1860 (Saros 119)	December 22, 1870 (Saros 120)	November 21, 1881 (Saros 121)	October 20, 1892 (Saros 122)	September 21, 1903 (Saros 123)
August 21, 1914 (Saros 124)	July 20, 1925 (Saros 125)	June 19, 1936 (Saros 126)	May 20, 1947 (Saros 127)	April 19, 1958 (Saros 128)
March 18, 1969 (Saros 129)	February 16, 1980 (Saros 130)	January 15, 1991 (Saros 131)	December 14, 2001 (Saros 132)	November 13, 2012 (Saros 133)
October 14, 2023 (Saros 134)	September 12, 2034 (Saros 135)	August 12, 2045 (Saros 136)	July 12, 2056 (Saros 137)	June 11, 2067 (Saros 138)
May 11, 2078 (Saros 139)	April 10, 2089 (Saros 140)	March 10, 2100 (Saros 141)	February 8, 2111 (Saros 142)	January 8, 2122 (Saros 143)
December 7, 2132 (Saros 144)	November 7, 2143 (Saros 145)	October 7, 2154 (Saros 146)	September 5, 2165 (Saros 147)	August 4, 2176 (Saros 148)
July 6, 2187 (Saros 149)	June 4, 2198 (Saros 150)			

=== Inex series ===
This eclipse is a part of the long period inex cycle, repeating at alternating nodes, every 358 synodic months (≈ 10,571.95 days, or 29 years minus 20 days). Their appearance and longitude are irregular due to a lack of synchronization with the anomalistic month (period of perigee). However, groupings of 3 inex cycles (≈ 87 years minus 2 months) comes close (≈ 1,151.02 anomalistic months), so eclipses are similar in these groupings.

Series members between 1801 and 2200
September 28, 1810 (Saros 131)	September 7, 1839 (Saros 132)	August 18, 1868 (Saros 133)
July 29, 1897 (Saros 134)	July 9, 1926 (Saros 135)	June 20, 1955 (Saros 136)
May 30, 1984 (Saros 137)	May 10, 2013 (Saros 138)	April 20, 2042 (Saros 139)
March 31, 2071 (Saros 140)	March 10, 2100 (Saros 141)	February 18, 2129 (Saros 142)
January 30, 2158 (Saros 143)	January 9, 2187 (Saros 144)	
