= Solar eclipse of May 22, 2077 =

Total eclipse

- Total eclipse
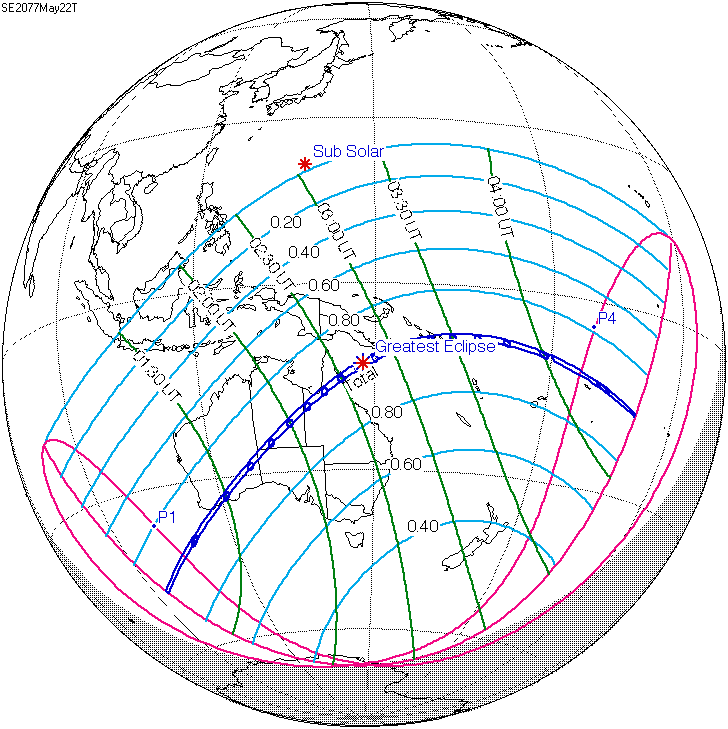
- Map
- Gamma: −0.5725
- Magnitude: 1.029

Maximum eclipse
- Duration: 174 s (2 min 54 s)
- Coordinates: 13.1°S 148.3°E
- Max. width of band: 119 km (74 mi)

Times (UTC)
- Greatest eclipse: 2:46:05

References
- Saros: 129 (55 of 80)
- Catalog # (SE5000): 9681

A total solar eclipse will occur at the Moon's ascending node of orbit on Saturday, May 22, 2077, with a magnitude of 1.029. A solar eclipse occurs when the Moon passes between Earth and the Sun, thereby totally or partly obscuring the image of the Sun for a viewer on Earth. A total solar eclipse occurs when the Moon's apparent diameter is larger than the Sun's, blocking all direct sunlight, turning day into darkness. Totality occurs in a narrow path across Earth's surface, with the partial solar eclipse visible over a surrounding region thousands of kilometres wide. Occurring about 3.2 days after perigee (on May 18, 2077, at 20:50 UTC), the Moon's apparent diameter will be larger.

The path of totality will be visible from parts of Australia, Papua New Guinea, and the Solomon Islands. A partial solar eclipse will also be visible for parts of Australia, Indonesia, Antarctica, and Oceania.

== Eclipse details ==
Shown below are two tables displaying details about this particular solar eclipse. The first table outlines times at which the Moon's penumbra or umbra attains the specific parameter, and the second table describes various other parameters pertaining to this eclipse.

May 22, 2077 Solar Eclipse Times
Event	Time (UTC)
First Penumbral External Contact	2077 May 22 at 00:12:22.3 UTC
First Umbral External Contact	2077 May 22 at 01:17:40.6 UTC
First Central Line	2077 May 22 at 01:18:13.0 UTC
First Umbral Internal Contact	2077 May 22 at 01:18:45.6 UTC
Equatorial Conjunction	2077 May 22 at 02:27:00.9 UTC
Ecliptic Conjunction	2077 May 22 at 02:40:03.0 UTC
Greatest Eclipse	2077 May 22 at 02:46:05.3 UTC
Greatest Duration	2077 May 22 at 02:48:00.5 UTC
Last Umbral Internal Contact	2077 May 22 at 04:13:40.3 UTC
Last Central Line	2077 May 22 at 04:14:10.3 UTC
Last Umbral External Contact	2077 May 22 at 04:14:40.1 UTC
Last Penumbral External Contact	2077 May 22 at 05:20:01.5 UTC

May 22, 2077 Solar Eclipse Parameters
Parameter	Value
Eclipse Magnitude	1.02903
Eclipse Obscuration	1.05889
Gamma	−0.57247
Sun Right Ascension	03h58m18.6s
Sun Declination	+20°29'25.4"
Sun Semi-Diameter	15'48.1"
Sun Equatorial Horizontal Parallax	08.7"
Moon Right Ascension	03h59m01.0s
Moon Declination	+19°57'18.2"
Moon Semi-Diameter	16'02.6"
Moon Equatorial Horizontal Parallax	0°58'52.8"
ΔT	103.3 s

== Eclipse season ==
This eclipse is part of an eclipse season, a period, roughly every six months, when eclipses occur. Only two (or occasionally three) eclipse seasons occur each year, and each season lasts about 35 days and repeats just short of six months (173 days) later; thus two full eclipse seasons always occur each year. Either two or three eclipses happen each eclipse season. In the sequence below, each eclipse is separated by a fortnight.

Eclipse season of May–June 2077
May 22 Ascending node (new moon)	June 6 Descending node (full moon)
Total solar eclipse Solar Saros 129	Partial lunar eclipse Lunar Saros 141

== Related eclipses ==
=== Eclipses in 2077 ===
- A total solar eclipse on May 22.
- A partial lunar eclipse on June 6.
- An annular solar eclipse on November 15.
- A partial lunar eclipse on November 29.

=== Metonic ===
- Preceded by: Solar eclipse of August 3, 2073
- Followed by: Solar eclipse of March 10, 2081

=== Tzolkinex ===
- Preceded by: Solar eclipse of April 11, 2070
- Followed by: Solar eclipse of July 3, 2084

=== Half-Saros ===
- Preceded by: Lunar eclipse of May 17, 2068
- Followed by: Lunar eclipse of May 28, 2086

=== Tritos ===
- Preceded by: Solar eclipse of June 22, 2066
- Followed by: Solar eclipse of April 21, 2088

=== Solar Saros 129 ===
- Preceded by: Solar eclipse of May 11, 2059
- Followed by: Solar eclipse of June 2, 2095

=== Inex ===
- Preceded by: Solar eclipse of June 11, 2048
- Followed by: Solar eclipse of May 3, 2106

=== Triad ===
- Preceded by: Solar eclipse of July 22, 1990
- Followed by: Solar eclipse of March 23, 2164

=== Solar eclipses of 2076–2079 ===
This eclipse is a member of a semester series. An eclipse in a semester series of solar eclipses repeats approximately every 177 days and 4 hours (a semester) at alternating nodes of the Moon's orbit.

The partial solar eclipses on January 6, 2076 and July 1, 2076 occur in the previous lunar year eclipse set.

Solar eclipse series sets from 2076 to 2079
Ascending node			Descending node		
Saros	Map	Gamma	Saros	Map	Gamma
119	June 1, 2076 Partial	−1.3897	124	November 26, 2076 Partial	1.1401
129	May 22, 2077 Total	−0.5725	134	November 15, 2077 Annular	0.4705
139	May 11, 2078 Total	0.1838	144	November 4, 2078 Annular	−0.2285
149	May 1, 2079 Total	0.9081	154	October 24, 2079 Annular	−0.9243

=== Saros 129 ===
This eclipse is a part of Saros series 129, repeating every 18 years, 11 days, and containing 80 events. The series started with a partial solar eclipse on October 3, 1103. It contains annular eclipses from May 6, 1464 through March 18, 1969; hybrid eclipses from March 29, 1987 through April 20, 2023; and total eclipses from April 30, 2041 through July 26, 2185. The series ends at member 80 as a partial eclipse on February 21, 2528. Its eclipses are tabulated in three columns; every third eclipse in the same column is one exeligmos apart, so they all cast shadows over approximately the same parts of the Earth.

The longest duration of annularity was produced by member 34 at 5 minutes, 10 seconds on October 4, 1698, and the longest duration of totality will be produced by member 58 at 3 minutes, 43 seconds on June 25, 2131. All eclipses in this series occur at the Moon’s ascending node of orbit.

Series members 40–61 occur between 1801 and 2200:
40	41	42
December 10, 1806	December 20, 1824	December 31, 1842
43	44	45
January 11, 1861	January 22, 1879	February 1, 1897
46	47	48
February 14, 1915	February 24, 1933	March 7, 1951
49	50	51
March 18, 1969	March 29, 1987	April 8, 2005
52	53	54
April 20, 2023	April 30, 2041	May 11, 2059
55	56	57
May 22, 2077	June 2, 2095	June 13, 2113
58	59	60
June 25, 2131	July 5, 2149	July 16, 2167
61
July 26, 2185

=== Metonic series ===
The metonic series repeats eclipses every 19 years (6939.69 days), lasting about 5 cycles. Eclipses occur in nearly the same calendar date. In addition, the octon subseries repeats 1/5 of that or every 3.8 years (1387.94 days). All eclipses in this table occur at the Moon's ascending node.

23 eclipse events between August 3, 2054 and October 16, 2145
August 3–4	May 22–24	March 10–11	December 27–29	October 14–16
117	119	121	123	125
August 3, 2054	May 22, 2058	March 11, 2062	December 27, 2065	October 15, 2069
127	129	131	133	135
August 3, 2073	May 22, 2077	March 10, 2081	December 27, 2084	October 14, 2088
137	139	141	143	145
August 3, 2092	May 22, 2096	March 10, 2100	December 29, 2103	October 16, 2107
147	149	151	153	155
August 4, 2111	May 24, 2115	March 11, 2119	December 28, 2122	October 16, 2126
157	159	161	163	165
August 4, 2130	May 23, 2134			October 16, 2145

=== Tritos series ===
This eclipse is a part of a tritos cycle, repeating at alternating nodes every 135 synodic months (≈ 3986.63 days, or 11 years minus 1 month). Their appearance and longitude are irregular due to a lack of synchronization with the anomalistic month (period of perigee), but groupings of 3 tritos cycles (≈ 33 years minus 3 months) come close (≈ 434.044 anomalistic months), so eclipses are similar in these groupings.

Series members between 1837 and 2200
April 5, 1837 (Saros 107)	March 5, 1848 (Saros 108)	February 3, 1859 (Saros 109)		December 2, 1880 (Saros 111)
		August 31, 1913 (Saros 114)	July 31, 1924 (Saros 115)	June 30, 1935 (Saros 116)
May 30, 1946 (Saros 117)	April 30, 1957 (Saros 118)	March 28, 1968 (Saros 119)	February 26, 1979 (Saros 120)	January 26, 1990 (Saros 121)
December 25, 2000 (Saros 122)	November 25, 2011 (Saros 123)	October 25, 2022 (Saros 124)	September 23, 2033 (Saros 125)	August 23, 2044 (Saros 126)
July 24, 2055 (Saros 127)	June 22, 2066 (Saros 128)	May 22, 2077 (Saros 129)	April 21, 2088 (Saros 130)	March 21, 2099 (Saros 131)
February 18, 2110 (Saros 132)	January 19, 2121 (Saros 133)	December 19, 2131 (Saros 134)	November 17, 2142 (Saros 135)	October 17, 2153 (Saros 136)
September 16, 2164 (Saros 137)	August 16, 2175 (Saros 138)	July 16, 2186 (Saros 139)	June 15, 2197 (Saros 140)	

=== Inex series ===
This eclipse is a part of the long period inex cycle, repeating at alternating nodes, every 358 synodic months (≈ 10,571.95 days, or 29 years minus 20 days). Their appearance and longitude are irregular due to a lack of synchronization with the anomalistic month (period of perigee). However, groupings of 3 inex cycles (≈ 87 years minus 2 months) comes close (≈ 1,151.02 anomalistic months), so eclipses are similar in these groupings.

Series members between 1801 and 2200
November 19, 1816 (Saros 120)	October 30, 1845 (Saros 121)	October 10, 1874 (Saros 122)
September 21, 1903 (Saros 123)	August 31, 1932 (Saros 124)	August 11, 1961 (Saros 125)
July 22, 1990 (Saros 126)	July 2, 2019 (Saros 127)	June 11, 2048 (Saros 128)
May 22, 2077 (Saros 129)	May 3, 2106 (Saros 130)	April 13, 2135 (Saros 131)
March 23, 2164 (Saros 132)	March 3, 2193 (Saros 133)	
