= Solar eclipse of August 3, 2073 =

Total eclipse

- Total eclipse
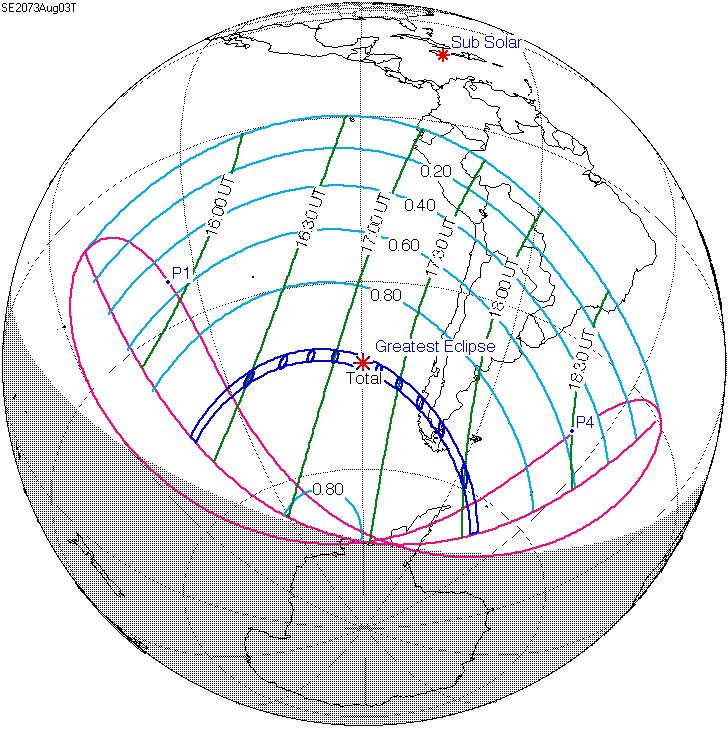
- Map
- Gamma: −0.8763
- Magnitude: 1.0294

Maximum eclipse
- Duration: 149 s (2 min 29 s)
- Coordinates: 43.2°S 89.4°W
- Max. width of band: 206 km (128 mi)

Times (UTC)
- Greatest eclipse: 17:15:23

References
- Saros: 127 (61 of 82)
- Catalog # (SE5000): 9672

A total solar eclipse will occur at the Moon's ascending node of orbit on Thursday, August 3, 2073, with a magnitude of 1.0294. A solar eclipse occurs when the Moon passes between Earth and the Sun, thereby totally or partly obscuring the image of the Sun for a viewer on Earth. A total solar eclipse occurs when the Moon's apparent diameter is larger than the Sun's, blocking all direct sunlight, turning day into darkness. Totality occurs in a narrow path across Earth's surface, with the partial solar eclipse visible over a surrounding region thousands of kilometres wide. Occurring about 3.1 days before perigee (on August 6, 2073, at 18:30 UTC), the Moon's apparent diameter will be larger.

The path of totality will be visible from parts of southern Chile and Argentina. A partial solar eclipse will also be visible for parts of central and southern South America and the Antarctic Peninsula.

== Eclipse details ==
Shown below are two tables displaying details about this particular solar eclipse. The first table outlines times at which the Moon's penumbra or umbra attains the specific parameter, and the second table describes various other parameters pertaining to this eclipse.

August 3, 2073 Solar Eclipse Times
Event	Time (UTC)
First Penumbral External Contact	2073 August 3 at 14:59:49.8 UTC
First Umbral External Contact	2073 August 3 at 16:23:00.4 UTC
First Central Line	2073 August 3 at 16:24:14.0 UTC
First Umbral Internal Contact	2073 August 3 at 16:25:29.0 UTC
Ecliptic Conjunction	2073 August 3 at 17:06:09.1 UTC
Greatest Eclipse	2073 August 3 at 17:15:22.9 UTC
Greatest Duration	2073 August 3 at 17:15:47.5 UTC
Equatorial Conjunction	2073 August 3 at 17:32:50.7 UTC
Last Umbral Internal Contact	2073 August 3 at 18:05:01.7 UTC
Last Central Line	2073 August 3 at 18:06:19.2 UTC
Last Umbral External Contact	2073 August 3 at 18:07:35.3 UTC
Last Penumbral External Contact	2073 August 3 at 19:30:43.1 UTC

August 3, 2073 Solar Eclipse Parameters
Parameter	Value
Eclipse Magnitude	1.02936
Eclipse Obscuration	1.05957
Gamma	−0.87626
Sun Right Ascension	08h57m50.6s
Sun Declination	+17°11'06.4"
Sun Semi-Diameter	15'45.7"
Sun Equatorial Horizontal Parallax	08.7"
Moon Right Ascension	08h57m11.2s
Moon Declination	+16°20'19.0"
Moon Semi-Diameter	16'06.2"
Moon Equatorial Horizontal Parallax	0°59'05.8"
ΔT	100.3 s

== Eclipse season ==
This eclipse is part of an eclipse season, a period, roughly every six months, when eclipses occur. Only two (or occasionally three) eclipse seasons occur each year, and each season lasts about 35 days and repeats just short of six months (173 days) later; thus two full eclipse seasons always occur each year. Either two or three eclipses happen each eclipse season. In the sequence below, each eclipse is separated by a fortnight.

Eclipse season of August 2073
August 3 Ascending node (new moon)	August 17 Descending node (full moon)
Total solar eclipse Solar Saros 127	Total lunar eclipse Lunar Saros 139

== Related eclipses ==
=== Eclipses in 2073 ===
- A partial solar eclipse on February 7.
- A total lunar eclipse on February 22.
- A total solar eclipse on August 3.
- A total lunar eclipse on August 17.

=== Metonic ===
- Preceded by: Solar eclipse of October 15, 2069
- Followed by: Solar eclipse of May 22, 2077

=== Tzolkinex ===
- Preceded by: Solar eclipse of June 22, 2066
- Followed by: Solar eclipse of September 13, 2080

=== Half-Saros ===
- Preceded by: Lunar eclipse of July 28, 2064
- Followed by: Lunar eclipse of August 8, 2082

=== Tritos ===
- Preceded by: Solar eclipse of September 3, 2062
- Followed by: Solar eclipse of July 3, 2084

=== Solar Saros 127 ===
- Preceded by: Solar eclipse of July 24, 2055
- Followed by: Solar eclipse of August 15, 2091

=== Inex ===
- Preceded by: Solar eclipse of August 23, 2044
- Followed by: Solar eclipse of July 15, 2102

=== Triad ===
- Preceded by: Solar eclipse of October 3, 1986
- Followed by: Solar eclipse of June 4, 2160

=== Solar eclipses of 2073–2076 ===
This eclipse is a member of a semester series. An eclipse in a semester series of solar eclipses repeats approximately every 177 days and 4 hours (a semester) at alternating nodes of the Moon's orbit.

The partial solar eclipses on June 1, 2076 and November 26, 2076 occur in the next lunar year eclipse set.

Solar eclipse series sets from 2073 to 2076
Descending node			Ascending node		
Saros	Map	Gamma	Saros	Map	Gamma
122	February 7, 2073 Partial	1.1651	127	August 3, 2073 Total	−0.8763
132	January 27, 2074 Annular	0.4251	137	July 24, 2074 Annular	−0.1242
142	January 16, 2075 Total	−0.2799	147	July 13, 2075 Annular	0.6583
152	January 6, 2076 Total	−0.9373	157	July 1, 2076 Partial	1.4005

=== Saros 127 ===
This eclipse is a part of Saros series 127, repeating every 18 years, 11 days, and containing 82 events. The series started with a partial solar eclipse on October 10, 991 AD. It contains total eclipses from May 14, 1352 through August 15, 2091. There are no annular or hybrid eclipses in this set. The series ends at member 82 as a partial eclipse on March 21, 2452. Its eclipses are tabulated in three columns; every third eclipse in the same column is one exeligmos apart, so they all cast shadows over approximately the same parts of the Earth.

The longest duration of totality was produced by member 31 at 5 minutes, 40 seconds on August 30, 1532. All eclipses in this series occur at the Moon’s ascending node of orbit.

Series members 46–68 occur between 1801 and 2200:
46	47	48
February 21, 1803	March 4, 1821	March 15, 1839
49	50	51
March 25, 1857	April 6, 1875	April 16, 1893
52	53	54
April 28, 1911	May 9, 1929	May 20, 1947
55	56	57
May 30, 1965	June 11, 1983	June 21, 2001
58	59	60
July 2, 2019	July 13, 2037	July 24, 2055
61	62	63
August 3, 2073	August 15, 2091	August 26, 2109
64	65	66
September 6, 2127	September 16, 2145	September 28, 2163
67	68	
October 8, 2181	October 19, 2199	

=== Metonic series ===
The metonic series repeats eclipses every 19 years (6939.69 days), lasting about 5 cycles. Eclipses occur in nearly the same calendar date. In addition, the octon subseries repeats 1/5 of that or every 3.8 years (1387.94 days). All eclipses in this table occur at the Moon's ascending node.

23 eclipse events between August 3, 2054 and October 16, 2145
August 3–4	May 22–24	March 10–11	December 27–29	October 14–16
117	119	121	123	125
August 3, 2054	May 22, 2058	March 11, 2062	December 27, 2065	October 15, 2069
127	129	131	133	135
August 3, 2073	May 22, 2077	March 10, 2081	December 27, 2084	October 14, 2088
137	139	141	143	145
August 3, 2092	May 22, 2096	March 10, 2100	December 29, 2103	October 16, 2107
147	149	151	153	155
August 4, 2111	May 24, 2115	March 11, 2119	December 28, 2122	October 16, 2126
157	159	161	163	165
August 4, 2130	May 23, 2134			October 16, 2145

=== Tritos series ===
This eclipse is a part of a tritos cycle, repeating at alternating nodes every 135 synodic months (≈ 3986.63 days, or 11 years minus 1 month). Their appearance and longitude are irregular due to a lack of synchronization with the anomalistic month (period of perigee), but groupings of 3 tritos cycles (≈ 33 years minus 3 months) come close (≈ 434.044 anomalistic months), so eclipses are similar in these groupings.

Series members between 1866 and 2200
March 16, 1866 (Saros 108)			December 13, 1898 (Saros 111)	
	September 12, 1931 (Saros 114)	August 12, 1942 (Saros 115)	July 11, 1953 (Saros 116)	June 10, 1964 (Saros 117)
May 11, 1975 (Saros 118)	April 9, 1986 (Saros 119)	March 9, 1997 (Saros 120)	February 7, 2008 (Saros 121)	January 6, 2019 (Saros 122)
December 5, 2029 (Saros 123)	November 4, 2040 (Saros 124)	October 4, 2051 (Saros 125)	September 3, 2062 (Saros 126)	August 3, 2073 (Saros 127)
July 3, 2084 (Saros 128)	June 2, 2095 (Saros 129)	May 3, 2106 (Saros 130)	April 2, 2117 (Saros 131)	March 1, 2128 (Saros 132)
January 30, 2139 (Saros 133)	December 30, 2149 (Saros 134)	November 27, 2160 (Saros 135)	October 29, 2171 (Saros 136)	September 27, 2182 (Saros 137)
August 26, 2193 (Saros 138)

=== Inex series ===
This eclipse is a part of the long period inex cycle, repeating at alternating nodes, every 358 synodic months (≈ 10,571.95 days, or 29 years minus 20 days). Their appearance and longitude are irregular due to a lack of synchronization with the anomalistic month (period of perigee). However, groupings of 3 inex cycles (≈ 87 years minus 2 months) comes close (≈ 1,151.02 anomalistic months), so eclipses are similar in these groupings.

Series members between 1801 and 2200
February 1, 1813 (Saros 118)	January 11, 1842 (Saros 119)	December 22, 1870 (Saros 120)
December 3, 1899 (Saros 121)	November 12, 1928 (Saros 122)	October 23, 1957 (Saros 123)
October 3, 1986 (Saros 124)	September 13, 2015 (Saros 125)	August 23, 2044 (Saros 126)
August 3, 2073 (Saros 127)	July 15, 2102 (Saros 128)	June 25, 2131 (Saros 129)
June 4, 2160 (Saros 130)	May 15, 2189 (Saros 131)	
