= Solar eclipse of December 27, 2065 =

Future partial solar eclipse

- Partial eclipse
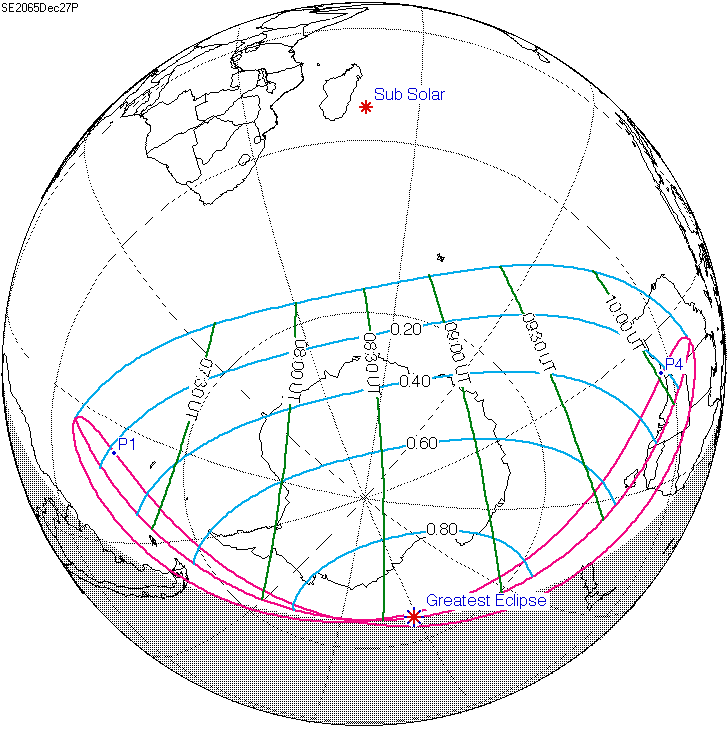
- Map
- Gamma: −1.0688
- Magnitude: 0.8769

Maximum eclipse
- Coordinates: 65.4°S 149.2°W

Times (UTC)
- Greatest eclipse: 8:39:56

References
- Saros: 123 (56 of 70)
- Catalog # (SE5000): 9655

A partial solar eclipse will occur at the Moon's ascending node of orbit on Sunday, December 27, 2065, with a magnitude of 0.8769. A solar eclipse occurs when the Moon passes between Earth and the Sun, thereby totally or partly obscuring the image of the Sun for a viewer on Earth. A partial solar eclipse occurs in the polar regions of the Earth when the center of the Moon's shadow misses the Earth.

This will be the last of four partial solar eclipses in 2065, with the others occurring on February 5, July 3, and August 2.

The partial solar eclipse will be visible for parts of Antarctica and the southern half of Australia.

== Eclipse details ==
Shown below are two tables displaying details about this particular solar eclipse. The first table outlines times at which the Moon's penumbra or umbra attains the specific parameter, and the second table describes various other parameters pertaining to this eclipse.

December 27, 2065 Solar Eclipse Times
Event	Time (UTC)
First Penumbral External Contact	2065 December 27 at 06:45:04.9 UTC
Equatorial Conjunction	2065 December 27 at 08:24:00.5 UTC
Ecliptic Conjunction	2065 December 27 at 08:29:12.5 UTC
Greatest Eclipse	2065 December 27 at 08:39:55.7 UTC
Last Penumbral External Contact	2065 December 27 at 10:34:55.8 UTC

December 27, 2065 Solar Eclipse Parameters
Parameter	Value
Eclipse Magnitude	0.87691
Eclipse Obscuration	0.84944
Gamma	−1.06879
Sun Right Ascension	18h26m44.9s
Sun Declination	-23°17'20.3"
Sun Semi-Diameter	16'15.7"
Sun Equatorial Horizontal Parallax	08.9"
Moon Right Ascension	18h27m25.5s
Moon Declination	-24°21'42.8"
Moon Semi-Diameter	16'37.3"
Moon Equatorial Horizontal Parallax	1°01'00.2"
ΔT	94.6 s

== Eclipse season ==
This eclipse is part of an eclipse season, a period, roughly every six months, when eclipses occur. Only two (or occasionally three) eclipse seasons occur each year, and each season lasts about 35 days and repeats just short of six months (173 days) later; thus two full eclipse seasons always occur each year. Either two or three eclipses happen each eclipse season. In the sequence below, each eclipse is separated by a fortnight.

Eclipse season of December 2065–January 2066
December 27 Ascending node (new moon)	January 11 Descending node (full moon)
Partial solar eclipse Solar Saros 123	Total lunar eclipse Lunar Saros 135

== Related eclipses ==
=== Eclipses in 2065 ===
- A total lunar eclipse on January 22.
- A partial solar eclipse on February 5.
- A partial solar eclipse on July 3.
- A total lunar eclipse on July 17.
- A partial solar eclipse on August 2.
- A partial solar eclipse on December 27.

=== Metonic ===
- Preceded by: Solar eclipse of March 11, 2062
- Followed by: Solar eclipse of October 15, 2069

=== Tzolkinex ===
- Preceded by: Solar eclipse of November 16, 2058
- Followed by: Solar eclipse of February 7, 2073

=== Half-Saros ===
- Preceded by: Lunar eclipse of December 22, 2056
- Followed by: Lunar eclipse of January 2, 2075

=== Tritos ===
- Preceded by: Solar eclipse of January 27, 2055
- Followed by: Solar eclipse of November 26, 2076

=== Solar Saros 123 ===
- Preceded by: Solar eclipse of December 16, 2047
- Followed by: Solar eclipse of January 7, 2084

=== Inex ===
- Preceded by: Solar eclipse of January 16, 2037
- Followed by: Solar eclipse of December 7, 2094

=== Triad ===
- Preceded by: Solar eclipse of February 26, 1979
- Followed by: Solar eclipse of October 28, 2152

=== Solar eclipses of 2065–2069 ===
This eclipse is a member of a semester series. An eclipse in a semester series of solar eclipses repeats approximately every 177 days and 4 hours (a semester) at alternating nodes of the Moon's orbit.

The partial solar eclipses on February 5, 2065 and August 2, 2065 occur in the previous lunar year eclipse set, and the partial solar eclipses on April 21, 2069 and October 15, 2069 occur in the next lunar year eclipse set.

Solar eclipse series sets from 2065 to 2069
Descending node			Ascending node		
Saros	Map	Gamma	Saros	Map	Gamma
118	July 3, 2065 Partial	1.4619	123	December 27, 2065 Partial	−1.0688
128	June 22, 2066 Annular	0.733	133	December 17, 2066 Total	−0.4043
138	June 11, 2067 Annular	−0.0387	143	December 6, 2067 Hybrid	0.2845
148	May 31, 2068 Total	−0.797	153	November 24, 2068 Partial	1.0299
158	May 20, 2069 Partial	−1.4852			

=== Saros 123 ===
This eclipse is a part of Saros series 123, repeating every 18 years, 11 days, and containing 70 events. The series started with a partial solar eclipse on April 29, 1074. It contains annular eclipses from July 2, 1182 through April 19, 1651; hybrid eclipses from April 30, 1669 through May 22, 1705; and total eclipses from June 3, 1723 through October 23, 1957. The series ends at member 70 as a partial eclipse on May 31, 2318. Its eclipses are tabulated in three columns; every third eclipse in the same column is one exeligmos apart, so they all cast shadows over approximately the same parts of the Earth.

The longest duration of annularity was produced by member 19 at 8 minutes, 7 seconds on November 9, 1398, and the longest duration of totality was produced by member 42 at 3 minutes, 27 seconds on July 27, 1813. All eclipses in this series occur at the Moon’s ascending node of orbit.

Series members 42–63 occur between 1801 and 2200:
42	43	44
July 27, 1813	August 7, 1831	August 18, 1849
45	46	47
August 29, 1867	September 8, 1885	September 21, 1903
48	49	50
October 1, 1921	October 12, 1939	October 23, 1957
51	52	53
November 3, 1975	November 13, 1993	November 25, 2011
54	55	56
December 5, 2029	December 16, 2047	December 27, 2065
57	58	59
January 7, 2084	January 19, 2102	January 30, 2120
60	61	62
February 9, 2138	February 21, 2156	March 3, 2174
63
March 13, 2192

=== Metonic series ===
The metonic series repeats eclipses every 19 years (6939.69 days), lasting about 5 cycles. Eclipses occur in nearly the same calendar date. In addition, the octon subseries repeats 1/5 of that or every 3.8 years (1387.94 days). All eclipses in this table occur at the Moon's ascending node.

23 eclipse events between August 3, 2054 and October 16, 2145
August 3–4	May 22–24	March 10–11	December 27–29	October 14–16
117	119	121	123	125
August 3, 2054	May 22, 2058	March 11, 2062	December 27, 2065	October 15, 2069
127	129	131	133	135
August 3, 2073	May 22, 2077	March 10, 2081	December 27, 2084	October 14, 2088
137	139	141	143	145
August 3, 2092	May 22, 2096	March 10, 2100	December 29, 2103	October 16, 2107
147	149	151	153	155
August 4, 2111	May 24, 2115	March 11, 2119	December 28, 2122	October 16, 2126
157	159	161	163	165
August 4, 2130	May 23, 2134			October 16, 2145

=== Tritos series ===
This eclipse is a part of a tritos cycle, repeating at alternating nodes every 135 synodic months (≈ 3986.63 days, or 11 years minus 1 month). Their appearance and longitude are irregular due to a lack of synchronization with the anomalistic month (period of perigee), but groupings of 3 tritos cycles (≈ 33 years minus 3 months) come close (≈ 434.044 anomalistic months), so eclipses are similar in these groupings.

The partial solar eclipses on April 8, 1902 (part of Saros 108) and January 5, 1935 (part of Saros 111) are also a part of this series but are not included in the table below.

Series members between 2000 and 2200
July 1, 2000 (Saros 117)	June 1, 2011 (Saros 118)	April 30, 2022 (Saros 119)	March 30, 2033 (Saros 120)	February 28, 2044 (Saros 121)
January 27, 2055 (Saros 122)	December 27, 2065 (Saros 123)	November 26, 2076 (Saros 124)	October 26, 2087 (Saros 125)	September 25, 2098 (Saros 126)
August 26, 2109 (Saros 127)	July 25, 2120 (Saros 128)	June 25, 2131 (Saros 129)	May 25, 2142 (Saros 130)	April 23, 2153 (Saros 131)
March 23, 2164 (Saros 132)	February 21, 2175 (Saros 133)	January 20, 2186 (Saros 134)	December 19, 2196 (Saros 135)	

=== Inex series ===
This eclipse is a part of the long period inex cycle, repeating at alternating nodes, every 358 synodic months (≈ 10,571.95 days, or 29 years minus 20 days). Their appearance and longitude are irregular due to a lack of synchronization with the anomalistic month (period of perigee). However, groupings of 3 inex cycles (≈ 87 years minus 2 months) comes close (≈ 1,151.02 anomalistic months), so eclipses are similar in these groupings.

Series members between 1801 and 2200
June 26, 1805 (Saros 114)	June 7, 1834 (Saros 115)	May 17, 1863 (Saros 116)
April 26, 1892 (Saros 117)	April 8, 1921 (Saros 118)	March 18, 1950 (Saros 119)
February 26, 1979 (Saros 120)	February 7, 2008 (Saros 121)	January 16, 2037 (Saros 122)
December 27, 2065 (Saros 123)	December 7, 2094 (Saros 124)	November 18, 2123 (Saros 125)
October 28, 2152 (Saros 126)	October 8, 2181 (Saros 127)	
