= Solar eclipse of October 14, 2088 =

Future annular solar eclipse

- Annular eclipse
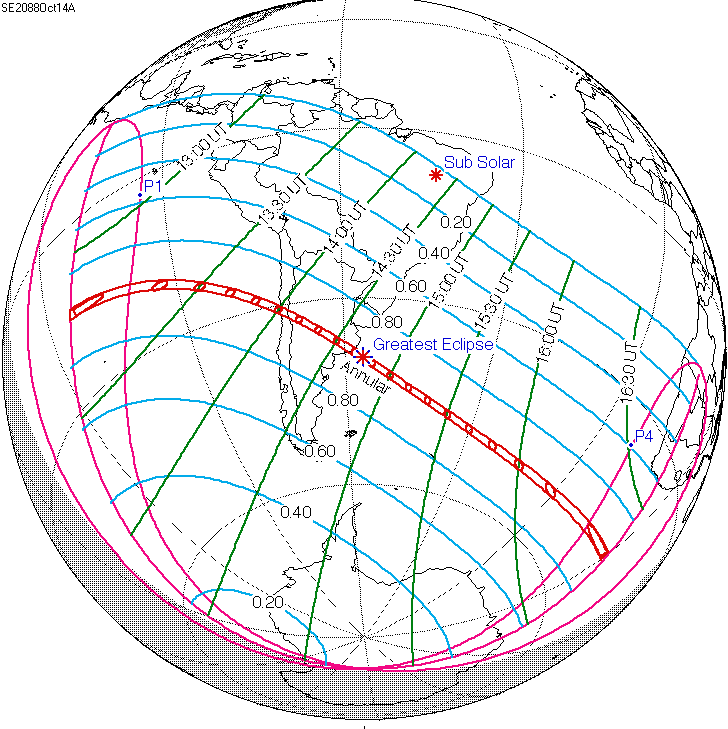
- Map
- Gamma: −0.5349
- Magnitude: 0.9727

Maximum eclipse
- Duration: 158 s (2 min 38 s)
- Coordinates: 39.7°S 56°W
- Max. width of band: 115 km (71 mi)

Times (UTC)
- Greatest eclipse: 14:48:05

References
- Saros: 135 (43 of 71)
- Catalog # (SE5000): 9707

An annular solar eclipse will occur at the Moon's ascending node of orbit on Thursday, October 14, 2088, with a magnitude of 0.9727. A solar eclipse occurs when the Moon passes between Earth and the Sun, thereby totally or partly obscuring the image of the Sun for a viewer on Earth. An annular solar eclipse occurs when the Moon's apparent diameter is smaller than the Sun's, blocking most of the Sun's light and causing the Sun to look like an annulus (ring). An annular eclipse appears as a partial eclipse over a region of the Earth thousands of kilometres wide. Occurring about 6.3 days before apogee (on October 20, 2088, at 21:10 UTC), the Moon's apparent diameter will be smaller.

The path of annularity will be visible from parts of Chile and Argentina. A partial solar eclipse will also be visible for parts of South America, Antarctica, and Southern Africa.

== Eclipse details ==
Shown below are two tables displaying details about this particular solar eclipse. The first table outlines times at which the Moon's penumbra or umbra attains the specific parameter, and the second table describes various other parameters pertaining to this eclipse.

October 14, 2088 Solar Eclipse Times
Event	Time (UTC)
First Penumbral External Contact	2088 October 14 at 12:03:04.6 UTC
First Umbral External Contact	2088 October 14 at 13:11:17.2 UTC
First Central Line	2088 October 14 at 13:12:48.2 UTC
First Umbral Internal Contact	2088 October 14 at 13:14:19.8 UTC
Ecliptic Conjunction	2088 October 14 at 14:42:05.5 UTC
Greatest Eclipse	2088 October 14 at 14:48:05.1 UTC
Equatorial Conjunction	2088 October 14 at 15:05:35.7 UTC
Greatest Duration	2088 October 14 at 15:28:07.6 UTC
Last Umbral Internal Contact	2088 October 14 at 16:21:35.2 UTC
Last Central Line	2088 October 14 at 16:23:09.9 UTC
Last Umbral External Contact	2088 October 14 at 16:24:44.2 UTC
Last Penumbral External Contact	2088 October 14 at 17:33:04.0 UTC

October 14, 2088 Solar Eclipse Parameters
Parameter	Value
Eclipse Magnitude	0.97271
Eclipse Obscuration	0.94616
Gamma	−0.53492
Sun Right Ascension	13h22m16.6s
Sun Declination	-08°39'19.3"
Sun Semi-Diameter	16'02.1"
Sun Equatorial Horizontal Parallax	08.8"
Moon Right Ascension	13h21m42.6s
Moon Declination	-09°08'15.8"
Moon Semi-Diameter	15'23.5"
Moon Equatorial Horizontal Parallax	0°56'29.4"
ΔT	113.0 s

== Eclipse season ==
This eclipse is part of an eclipse season, a period, roughly every six months, when eclipses occur. Only two (or occasionally three) eclipse seasons occur each year, and each season lasts about 35 days and repeats just short of six months (173 days) later; thus two full eclipse seasons always occur each year. Either two or three eclipses happen each eclipse season. In the sequence below, each eclipse is separated by a fortnight.

Eclipse season of October 2088
October 14 Ascending node (new moon)	October 30 Descending node (full moon)
Annular solar eclipse Solar Saros 135	Partial lunar eclipse Lunar Saros 147

== Related eclipses ==
=== Eclipses in 2088 ===
- A total solar eclipse on April 21.
- A partial lunar eclipse on May 5.
- An annular solar eclipse on October 14.
- A partial lunar eclipse on October 30.

=== Metonic ===
- Preceded by: Solar eclipse of December 27, 2084
- Followed by: Solar eclipse of August 3, 2092

=== Tzolkinex ===
- Preceded by: Solar eclipse of September 3, 2081
- Followed by: Solar eclipse of November 27, 2095

=== Half-Saros ===
- Preceded by: Lunar eclipse of October 10, 2079
- Followed by: Lunar eclipse of October 21, 2097

=== Tritos ===
- Preceded by: Solar eclipse of November 15, 2077
- Followed by: Solar eclipse of September 14, 2099

=== Solar Saros 135 ===
- Preceded by: Solar eclipse of October 4, 2070
- Followed by: Solar eclipse of October 26, 2106

=== Inex ===
- Preceded by: Solar eclipse of November 5, 2059
- Followed by: Solar eclipse of September 26, 2117

=== Triad ===
- Preceded by: Solar eclipse of December 14, 2001
- Followed by: Solar eclipse of August 16, 2175

=== Solar eclipses of 2087–2090 ===
This eclipse is a member of a semester series. An eclipse in a semester series of solar eclipses repeats approximately every 177 days and 4 hours (a semester) at alternating nodes of the Moon's orbit.

The partial solar eclipse on June 1, 2087 occurs in the previous lunar year eclipse set.

Solar eclipse series sets from 2087 to 2090
Descending node			Ascending node		
Saros	Map	Gamma	Saros	Map	Gamma
120	May 2, 2087 Partial	1.1139	125	October 26, 2087 Partial	−1.2882
130	April 21, 2088 Total	0.4135	135	October 14, 2088 Annular	−0.5349
140	April 10, 2089 Annular	−0.3319	145	October 4, 2089 Total	0.2167
150	March 31, 2090 Partial	−1.1028	155	September 23, 2090 Total	0.9157

=== Saros 135 ===
This eclipse is a part of Saros series 135, repeating every 18 years, 11 days, and containing 71 events. The series started with a partial solar eclipse on July 5, 1331. It contains annular eclipses from October 21, 1511 through February 24, 2305; hybrid eclipses on March 8, 2323 and March 18, 2341; and total eclipses from March 29, 2359 through May 22, 2449. The series ends at member 71 as a partial eclipse on August 17, 2593. Its eclipses are tabulated in three columns; every third eclipse in the same column is one exeligmos apart, so they all cast shadows over approximately the same parts of the Earth.

The longest duration of annularity was produced by member 16 at 10 minutes, 41 seconds on December 24, 1601, and the longest duration of totality will be produced by member 62 at 2 minutes, 27 seconds on May 12, 2431. All eclipses in this series occur at the Moon’s ascending node of orbit.

Series members 28–49 occur between 1801 and 2200:
28	29	30
May 5, 1818	May 15, 1836	May 26, 1854
31	32	33
June 6, 1872	June 17, 1890	June 28, 1908
34	35	36
July 9, 1926	July 20, 1944	July 31, 1962
37	38	39
August 10, 1980	August 22, 1998	September 1, 2016
40	42	42
September 12, 2034	September 22, 2052	October 4, 2070
43	44	45
October 14, 2088	October 26, 2106	November 6, 2124
46	47	48
November 17, 2142	November 27, 2160	December 9, 2178
49
December 19, 2196

=== Metonic series ===
The metonic series repeats eclipses every 19 years (6939.69 days), lasting about 5 cycles. Eclipses occur in nearly the same calendar date. In addition, the octon subseries repeats 1/5 of that or every 3.8 years (1387.94 days). All eclipses in this table occur at the Moon's ascending node.

23 eclipse events between August 3, 2054 and October 16, 2145
August 3–4	May 22–24	March 10–11	December 27–29	October 14–16
117	119	121	123	125
August 3, 2054	May 22, 2058	March 11, 2062	December 27, 2065	October 15, 2069
127	129	131	133	135
August 3, 2073	May 22, 2077	March 10, 2081	December 27, 2084	October 14, 2088
137	139	141	143	145
August 3, 2092	May 22, 2096	March 10, 2100	December 29, 2103	October 16, 2107
147	149	151	153	155
August 4, 2111	May 24, 2115	March 11, 2119	December 28, 2122	October 16, 2126
157	159	161	163	165
August 4, 2130	May 23, 2134			October 16, 2145

=== Tritos series ===
This eclipse is a part of a tritos cycle, repeating at alternating nodes every 135 synodic months (≈ 3986.63 days, or 11 years minus 1 month). Their appearance and longitude are irregular due to a lack of synchronization with the anomalistic month (period of perigee), but groupings of 3 tritos cycles (≈ 33 years minus 3 months) come close (≈ 434.044 anomalistic months), so eclipses are similar in these groupings.

Series members between 1801 and 2200
January 1, 1805 (Saros 109)		October 31, 1826 (Saros 111)		August 28, 1848 (Saros 113)
July 29, 1859 (Saros 114)	June 28, 1870 (Saros 115)	May 27, 1881 (Saros 116)	April 26, 1892 (Saros 117)	March 29, 1903 (Saros 118)
February 25, 1914 (Saros 119)	January 24, 1925 (Saros 120)	December 25, 1935 (Saros 121)	November 23, 1946 (Saros 122)	October 23, 1957 (Saros 123)
September 22, 1968 (Saros 124)	August 22, 1979 (Saros 125)	July 22, 1990 (Saros 126)	June 21, 2001 (Saros 127)	May 20, 2012 (Saros 128)
April 20, 2023 (Saros 129)	March 20, 2034 (Saros 130)	February 16, 2045 (Saros 131)	January 16, 2056 (Saros 132)	December 17, 2066 (Saros 133)
November 15, 2077 (Saros 134)	October 14, 2088 (Saros 135)	September 14, 2099 (Saros 136)	August 15, 2110 (Saros 137)	July 14, 2121 (Saros 138)
June 13, 2132 (Saros 139)	May 14, 2143 (Saros 140)	April 12, 2154 (Saros 141)	March 12, 2165 (Saros 142)	February 10, 2176 (Saros 143)
January 9, 2187 (Saros 144)	December 9, 2197 (Saros 145)			

=== Inex series ===
This eclipse is a part of the long period inex cycle, repeating at alternating nodes, every 358 synodic months (≈ 10,571.95 days, or 29 years minus 20 days). Their appearance and longitude are irregular due to a lack of synchronization with the anomalistic month (period of perigee). However, groupings of 3 inex cycles (≈ 87 years minus 2 months) comes close (≈ 1,151.02 anomalistic months), so eclipses are similar in these groupings.

Series members between 1801 and 2200
April 14, 1828 (Saros 126)	March 25, 1857 (Saros 127)	March 5, 1886 (Saros 128)
February 14, 1915 (Saros 129)	January 25, 1944 (Saros 130)	January 4, 1973 (Saros 131)
December 14, 2001 (Saros 132)	November 25, 2030 (Saros 133)	November 5, 2059 (Saros 134)
October 14, 2088 (Saros 135)	September 26, 2117 (Saros 136)	September 6, 2146 (Saros 137)
August 16, 2175 (Saros 138)		
