= Lists of solar eclipses =

A solar eclipse occurs when the Moon passes between Earth and the Sun, thereby obscuring the view of the Sun from a small part of the Earth, totally or partially.

== By location ==
- List of solar eclipses visible from Australia
- List of solar eclipses visible from the British Isles
- List of solar eclipses visible from China
- List of solar eclipses visible from Europe
- List of solar eclipses visible from Israel
- List of solar eclipses visible from the Philippines
- List of solar eclipses visible from Russia
- List of solar eclipses visible from Turkey
- List of solar eclipses visible from Ukraine
- List of solar eclipses visible from the United States

== By time period of history ==
Pre-Modern

- List of solar eclipses in antiquity (20th century BCE to 4th century CE/AD)
- List of solar eclipses in the Middle Ages (5th to 15th century)

Modern history

- List of solar eclipses in the 16th century
- List of solar eclipses in the 17th century
- List of solar eclipses in the 18th century
- List of solar eclipses in the 19th century
- List of solar eclipses in the 20th century
- List of solar eclipses in the 21st century

Future

- List of solar eclipses in the 22nd century
- Solar eclipses after the modern era (22nd to 30th century)

== See also ==
- List of films featuring eclipses
- Solar eclipses in fiction
- Lists of lunar eclipses
