= List of solar eclipses visible from Ukraine =

This list of solar eclipses seen from Ukraine enumerates the solar eclipses that were seen and will be seen in Ukraine.

== Twenty-first century ==
- Solar eclipse of May 31, 2003
- Solar eclipse of October 3, 2005
- Solar eclipse of March 29, 2006
- Solar eclipse of August 1, 2008
- Solar eclipse of January 15, 2010
- Solar eclipse of January 4, 2011
- Solar eclipse of March 20, 2015
- Solar eclipse of June 21, 2020
- Solar eclipse of June 10, 2021
- Solar eclipse of October 25, 2022
- Solar eclipse of March 29, 2025
- Solar eclipse of August 12, 2026
- Solar eclipse of August 2, 2027
- Solar eclipse of June 12, 2029
- Solar eclipse of June 1, 2030 (annular)
- Solar eclipse of March 20, 2034
- Solar eclipse of January 16, 2037
- Solar eclipse of January 5, 2038
- Solar eclipse of July 2, 2038
- Solar eclipse of June 21, 2039
- Solar eclipse of June 11, 2048 (annular)
- Solar eclipse of November 14, 2050
- Solar eclipse of September 12, 2053
- Solar eclipse of November 5, 2059
- Solar eclipse of April 30, 2060
- Solar eclipse of April 20, 2061 (total)
- Solar eclipse of February 5, 2065
- Solar eclipse of July 3, 2065
- Solar eclipse of April 21, 2069
- Solar eclipse of September 12, 2072
- Solar eclipse of January 27, 2074
- Solar eclipse of July 13, 2075
- Solar eclipse of November 26, 2076
- Solar eclipse of May 1, 2079
- Solar eclipse of September 13, 2080
- Solar eclipse of September 3, 2081
- Solar eclipse of February 27, 2082
- Solar eclipse of April 21, 2088
- Solar eclipse of February 18, 2091
- Solar eclipse of July 23, 2093 (annular)

May 31, 2003	October 3, 2005	March 29, 2006	August 1, 2008
January 15, 2010	January 4, 2011	March 20, 2015	June 21, 2020
June 10, 2021	October 25, 2022	March 29, 2025	August 12, 2026
August 2, 2027	June 12, 2029	June 1, 2030	March 20, 2034
January 16, 2037	January 5, 2038	July 2, 2038	June 21, 2039
June 11, 2048	September 12, 2053	November 5, 2059	April 30, 2060
April 20, 2061	February 5, 2065	July 3, 2065	April 21, 2069
September 12, 2072	January 27, 2074	July 13, 2075	November 26, 2076
May 1, 2079	September 13, 2080	September 3, 2081	February 27, 2082
April 21, 2088	February 18, 2091	July 23, 2093	
