= List of solar eclipses visible from Europe =

This list of solar eclipses visible from Europe enumerates the solar eclipses that have been seen and will be seen in Europe.

== 20th century ==
=== Total, hybrid and annular eclipses ===
Total eclipse of August 11, 1999

- Solar eclipse of November 11, 1901
- Solar eclipse of August 30, 1905
- Solar eclipse of January 14, 1907
- Solar eclipse of April 17, 1912
- Solar eclipse of August 21, 1914
- Solar eclipse of April 8, 1921
- Solar eclipse of June 29, 1927
- Solar eclipse of June 19, 1936
- Solar eclipse of April 19, 1939 (Zemlya Georga archipeligo)
- Solar eclipse of September 21, 1941 (Caucasus)
- Solar eclipse of July 9, 1945
- Solar eclipse of June 30, 1954
- Solar eclipse of April 30, 1957 (Arkhangelsk Oblast, RSFSR)
- Solar eclipse of February 15, 1961
- Solar eclipse of May 20, 1966 (Greece)
- Solar eclipse of September 22, 1968 (Arkhangelsk Oblast, RSFSR)
- Solar eclipse of April 29, 1976 (Crete)
- Solar eclipse of July 31, 1981 (Caucasus)
- Solar eclipse of July 22, 1990
- Solar eclipse of August 11, 1999

Total solar eclipses, visible from Europe in the 20th century
August 30, 1905	January 14, 1907	August 21, 1914	June 29, 1927
June 19, 1936	September 21, 1941	July 9, 1945	June 30, 1954
February 15, 1961	September 22, 1968	July 31, 1981	July 22, 1990
August 11, 1999

Hybrid solar eclipses, visible from Europe in the 20th century
April 17, 1912
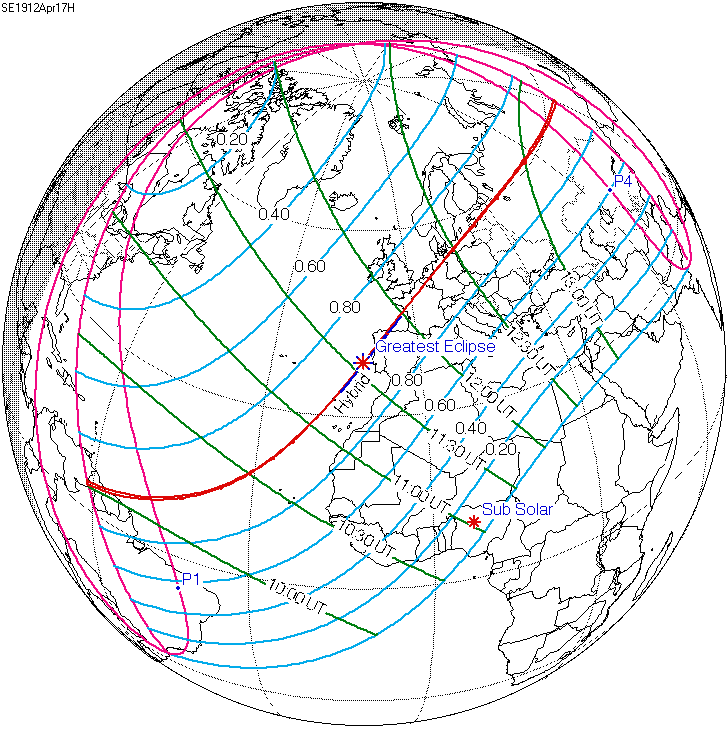

Annular solar eclipses, visible from Europe in the 20th century
November 11, 1901	April 8, 1921	April 19, 1939	April 30, 1957
May 20, 1966	April 29, 1976		

== 21st century ==
=== Total and annular eclipses ===
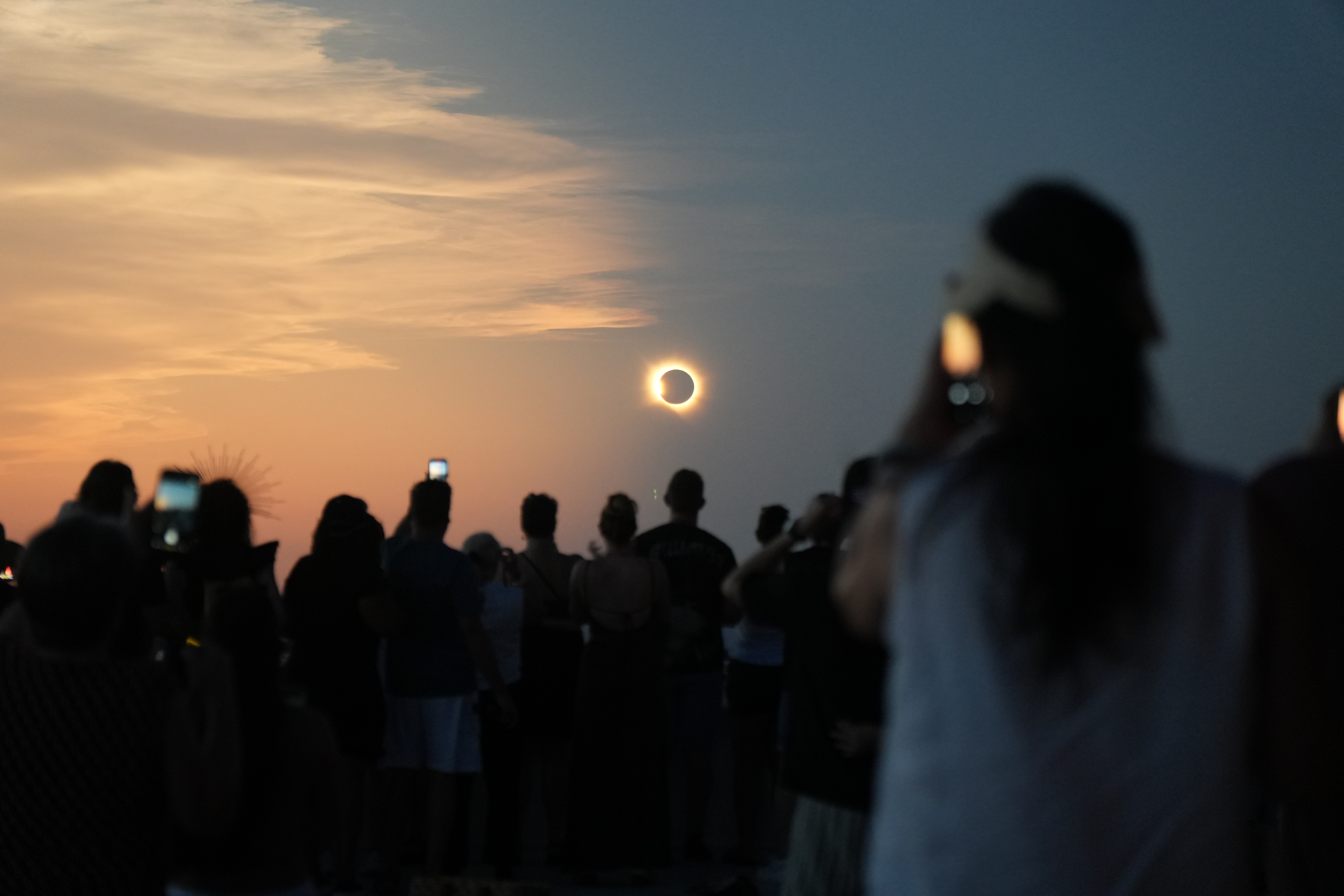
Total eclipse of August 12, 2026, being viewed from a cruise ship

- Solar eclipse of May 31, 2003
- Solar eclipse of October 3, 2005
- Solar eclipse of March 29, 2006
- Solar eclipse of August 1, 2008 (Severny Island)
- Solar eclipse of March 20, 2015 (Longyearbyen)
- Solar eclipse of August 12, 2026
- Solar eclipse of August 2, 2027
- Solar eclipse of January 26, 2028
- Solar eclipse of June 1, 2030
- Solar eclipse of June 21, 2039
- Solar eclipse of June 11, 2048
- Solar eclipse of September 12, 2053
- Solar eclipse of November 5, 2059
- Solar eclipse of April 30, 2060 (European Azerbaijan)
- Solar eclipse of April 20, 2061
- Solar eclipse of July 13, 2075
- Solar eclipse of September 3, 2081
- Solar eclipse of February 27, 2082
- Solar eclipse of July 3, 2084
- Solar eclipse of April 21, 2088
- Solar eclipse of September 23, 2090
- Solar eclipse of July 23, 2093
- Solar eclipse of May 11, 2097 (Longyearbyen, Murmansk Oblast)

Total solar eclipses, visible from Europe in the 21st century
March 29, 2006	August 1, 2008	March 20, 2015	August 12, 2026
August 2, 2027	September 12, 2053	April 30, 2060	April 20, 2061
September 3, 2081	April 21, 2088	September 23, 2090	May 11, 2097

Annular solar eclipses, visible from Europe in the 21st century
May 31, 2003	October 3, 2005	January 26, 2028	June 1, 2030
June 21, 2039	June 11, 2048	November 5, 2059	July 13, 2075
February 27, 2082	July 3, 2084	July 23, 2093	

== Eclipses for major cities in next 5 years ==
Cities with a population of more than one million people are listed here. Obscuration and moment of time with maximum magnitude (UTC) are indicated. Annular and total eclipses in cities are market with bold.

City	2027-08-02	2028-01-26	2029-06-12	2030-06-01
Istanbul	59.4% 12:39	-	-	88,1% 8:04
Moscow	9.3% 12:39	-	1.6% 5:51	71.2% 8:35
London	41.9% 8:59	50.6% 16:34	-	47.7% 5:21
Saint Petersburg	6.3% 12:30	-	6.7% 6:01	57.8% 8:39
Berlin	34.1% 10:13	-	8.1% 3:57	56.7% 6:21
Madrid	86.4% 9:51	82.3% 17:55	-	62.7% 6:06
Kyiv	27.4% 12:34	-	0.8% 5:45	75.7% 8:22
Rome	74.5% 10:12	24% 17:13	-	74.6% 6:04
Paris	51.2% 10:01	54.1% 17:33	-	53.4% 6:16
Vienna	47.1% 10:17	-	3.3% 3:57	66.5% 6:14
Minsk	20.7% 12:29	-	3.7% 5:52	66.4% 8:27
Hamburg	32.2% 10:10	3.2% 16.45	10.3% 4:01	52.4% 6:23
Warsaw	30.2% 10:22	-	5% 3:53	63.3% 6:22
Barcelona	81.7% 9:58	82.3% 17:56	-	65.9% 6:05
Bucharest	51.2% 11:32	-	-	83.3% 7:09
Budapest	47.5% 10:20	-	2.4% 3:49	70.4% 6:13
Belgrade	55.9% 10:23	-	0.1% 3:55	76.9% 6:08
Munich	50.5% 10:11	12.3% 16:59	0.5% 4:17	62.3% 6:14
Kharkiv	22.7% 12:41	-	-	82% 8:24
Prague	41.7% 10:14	0% 16:41	5.8% 3:56	61.6% 6:17
Milan	62.1% 10:08	32.1% 17:17	-	64.8% 6:10
Kazan	2.1% 12:50	-	-	80.2% 8:45
Sofia	60.9% 11:28	-	-	84% 7:05
Nizhny Novgorod	4.3% 12:45	-	0.4% 5:51	75.1% 8:41
Amsterdam	37.9% 10:05	26.9% 17:10	5.7% 4:22	50.3% 6:22
Ufa	0.2% 12:58	-	-	87.4% 8:50
Birmingham	38.6% 8:59	49.8% 16:37	-	45.2% 5:23
Krasnodar	32.1% 12:50	-	-	88.5% 8:16
Samara	4.3% 12:54	-	-	86.9% 8:41
Rostov-on-Don	25.5% 12:48	-	-	88.5% 8:21
Voronezh	15.9% 12:44	-	-	81.2% 8:29
Perm	-	-	-	79.8% 8:56
Cologne	42.3% 10:06	23.4% 17:08	3.2% 4:22	54% 6:19
Volgograd	16.6% 12:53	-	-	88.7% 8:28

== Total and annular eclipses between 1001 and 2300 in cities ==
=== Istanbul ===
- December 30, 1255 (Annular)
- August 5, 1263 (Annular)
- May 25, 1267 (Total)
- October 7, 1344 (Annular)
- January 1, 1386 (Total)
- July 31, 1590 (Annular)
- December 15, 1610 (Annular)
- March 30, 1661 (Total)
- October 9, 1847 (Annular)
- June 1, 2030 (Annular)
- September 3, 2081 (Total)
- April 21, 2088 (Total)
- March 15, 2249 (Annular)

=== Moscow ===
- June 07, 1415 (Total)
- February 25, 1476 (Total)
- June 8, 1518 (Annular)
- April 26, 1827 (Annular)
- August 19, 1887 (Total)
- July 13, 2075 (Annular)
- October 16, 2126 (Total)
- February 10, 2195 (Annular)
- August 29, 2296 (Annular)

=== London ===
- September 5, 1290 (Annular)
- January 31, 1310 (Annular)
- April 15, 1409 (Annular)
- November 12, 1547 (Annular)
- May 3, 1715 (Total)

=== St. Petersburg ===
- May 12, 1706 (Total)
- October 16, 2126 (Total)
- February 10, 2195 (Annular)
- August 29, 2296 (Annular)

=== Berlin ===
- January 26, 1153 (Annular)
- June 23, 1191 (Annular)
- February 28, 1207 (Annular)
- April 15, 1409 (Annular)
- October 1, 1502 (Annular)
- November 12, 1547 (Annular)
- July 25, 1748 (Annular)
- August 19, 1887 (Total)
- July 23, 2093 (Annular)
- October 7, 2135 (Total)

=== Madrid ===
- June 3, 1239 (Total)
- June 7, 1415 (Total)
- April 5, 1437 (Annular)
- July 29, 1478 (Total)
- February 25, 1579 (Annular)
- April 1, 1764 (Annular)
- July 8, 1842 (Total)
- October 3, 2005 (Annular)
- August 16, 2175 (Annular)

=== Kyiv ===
- March 23, 1270 (Annular)
- September 5, 1290 (Annular)
- June 8 1518 (Annular)
- November 2, 1556 (Annular)
- June 1, 1639 (Annular)
- May 15, 1836 (Annular)
- July 28, 1851 (Total)
- August 21, 1914 (Total)
- June 30, 1954 (Total)
- February 10, 2195 (Annular)
- September 18, 2229 (Annular)

=== Rome ===
- May 14, 1333 (Annular)
- January 1, 1390 (Total)
- April 9, 1567 (Total)
- July 6, 2187 (Total)
- September 27, 2220 (Annular)
- June 28, 2299 (Total)

=== Paris ===
- June 16, 1409 (Total)
- May 22, 1724 (Total)
- April 1, 1764 (Annular)
- October 9, 1847 (Annular)
- September 2, 2081 (Total)
- September 23, 2090 (Total)

=== Vienna ===
- September 23, 1093 (Annular)
- June 17, 1433 (Total)
- July 8, 1842 (Total)
- July 13, 2075 (Annular)
- February 27, 2082 (Annular)
