= List of solar eclipses visible from Israel =

The following is a partial list of solar eclipses visible from Israel.

== Twentieth century ==
November 11, 1901	August 30, 1905	January 14, 1907	April 17, 1912
August 21, 1914	January 23, 1917	April 8, 1921	March 28, 1922
January 14, 1926	June 29, 1927	November 12, 1928	November 1, 1929
February 24, 1933	August 21, 1933	June 19, 1936	July 20, 1944
July 9, 1945	November 1, 1948	February 25, 1952	June 30, 1954
December 14, 1955	December 2, 1956	October 2, 1959	February 15, 1961
May 20, 1966	September 22, 1968	June 30, 1973	April 29, 1976
February 16, 1980	December 15, 1982	December 4, 1983	March 29, 1987
August 11, 1999

== Twenty-first century ==
May 31, 2003	October 3, 2005	March 29, 2006	January 15, 2010
January 4, 2011	November 3, 2013	March 20, 2015	June 21, 2020
October 25, 2022	August 2, 2027	June 1, 2030	March 20, 2034
January 16, 2037	July 2, 2038	April 30, 2041	June 11, 2048
September 12, 2053	November 5, 2059	April 30, 2060	February 17, 2064
February 5, 2065	January 27, 2074	July 13, 2075	November 26, 2076
February 5, 2065	January 27, 2074	July 13, 2075	November 26, 2076
September 3, 2081	April 21, 2088	February 18, 2091	August 3, 2092
July 23, 2093	September 4, 2100		

== Total and annular solar eclipses visible from cities ==
The following is a list of total and annular solar eclipses visible from selected cities in Israel.

=== Jerusalem ===
The last total solar eclipse visible from Jerusalem occurred on Sunday, August 21, 1933, and the next one will not occur until Sunday, August 8, 2241.

- 1655 February 6 (annular)
- 1820 September 7 (annular)
- 1933 August 21 (annular)
- 2241 August 8 (total)
- 2276 March 16 (annular)
- 2447 July 13 (annular)
- 2548 August 5 (total)
- 2704 September 21 (annular)
- 2732 September 11 (annular)
- 2934 October 29 (annular)

=== Haifa ===
- 1655 February 6 (annular)
- 1676 June 11 (annular)
- 1709 March 11 (annular)
- 1773 March 23 (annular)
- 2276 March 16 (annular)
- 2447 July 13 (annular)
- 2704 September 21 (annular)
- 2732 September 11 (annular)
- 2950 July 6 (annular)

=== Tel Aviv ===
- 1655 February 6 (annular)
- 1820 September 7 (annular)
- 2276 March 16 (annular)
- 2447 July 13 (annular)
- 2548 August 5 (total)
- 2704 September 21 (annular)
- 2732 September 11 (annular)
- 2934 October 29 (annular)

=== Beersheba ===
- 1133 August 2
