= List of solar eclipses visible from Turkey =

This list of solar eclipses visible from Turkey enumerates the solar eclipses that have been and will be seen over Turkey.

== Eighteenth century and earlier ==
=== Total solar eclipses ===
| January 8, 1339 BC | June 24, 1311 BC | June 15, 762 BC | May 28, 584 BC |
| August 2, 1133 | August 12, 1654 | June 13, 1760 | |

=== Annular solar eclipses ===
March 13, 1334 BC
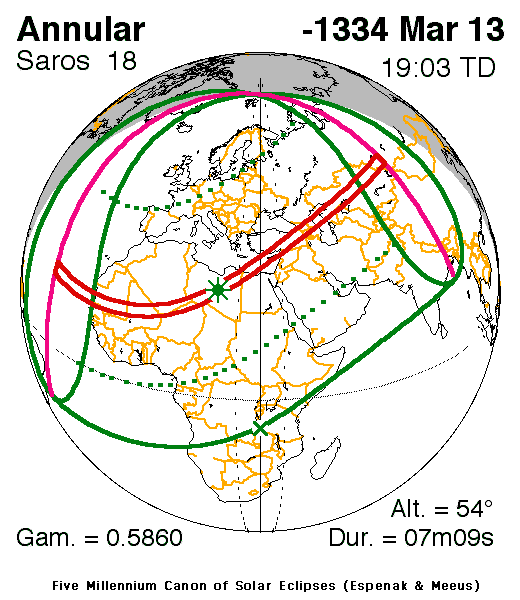

=== Partial solar eclipses ===
January 4, 1639
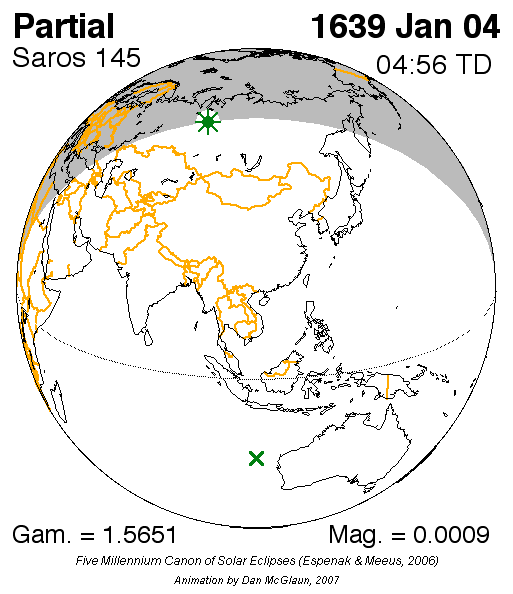

== Nineteenth century ==
=== Total solar eclipses ===
| November 19, 1816 | July 28, 1851 | December 22, 1870 |

=== Annular solar eclipses ===
September 7, 1820
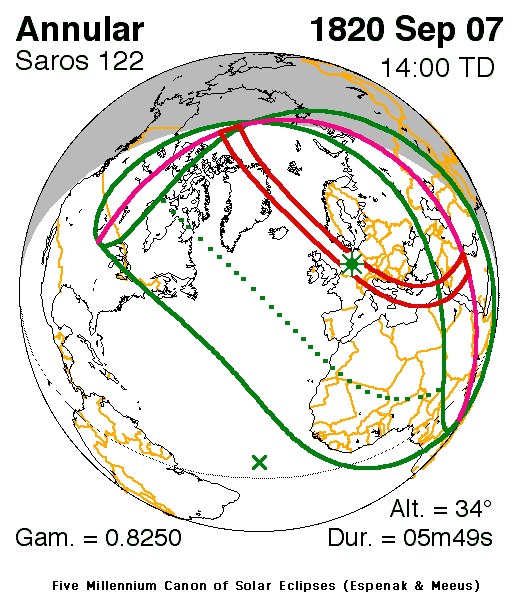

== Twentieth century ==
=== Total solar eclipses ===
| August 21, 1914 | June 19, 1936 | August 11, 1999 |

=== Annular solar eclipses ===
| May 20, 1966 | April 29, 1976 |

=== Partial solar eclipses ===
| October 31, 1902 | January 23, 1917 | November 12, 1928 | September 10, 1942 |
| April 28, 1949 | December 2, 1956 | February 25, 1971 | May 11, 1975 |
| December 15, 1982 | May 21, 1993 | October 12, 1996 | |

== Twenty-first century ==
=== Total solar eclipses ===
| March 29, 2006 | April 30, 2060 | September 3, 2081 | April 21, 2088 |

=== Annular solar eclipses ===
| June 1, 2030 | July 23, 2093 |

=== Partial solar eclipses ===
| January 4, 2011 | October 25, 2022 | November 3, 2032 | January 16, 2037 |
| November 14, 2050 | February 5, 2065 | November 26, 2076 | December 6, 2086 |
February 18, 2091
