= List of eclipses =

List of eclipses may refer to:

- Lists of lunar eclipses
- Lists of solar eclipses
