= Solar eclipse (disambiguation) =

A solar eclipse occurs when parts of the Earth is in a shadow cast.

Solar eclipse may also refer to:

- Solar Eclipse (video game), a 1995 video game
- "Solar Eclipse" (YoungBoy Never Broke Again song), 2018
- "Solar Eclipse" (Drake song), 2026

== See also ==
- List of solar eclipses
- Eclipse of the Sun (disambiguation)
