= List of solar eclipses visible from the Philippines =

This list of solar eclipse visible from the Philippines enumerates the solar eclipse that have been and will be seen over the Philippines.

A solar eclipse occurs when the Moon passes between Earth and the Sun, thereby obscuring Earth's view of the Sun. Eclipses can be total, annular, or partial.

A total solar eclipse occurs when the Moon's apparent diameter is larger than the Sun's, blocking all direct sunlight, turning day into darkness for a brief moment in time. While an annular solar eclipse occurs when the Moon's apparent diameter is smaller than the Sun's, blocking most of the Sun's light and causing the Sun to look like an annulus (ring). These central eclipses occurs only in a narrow path across Earth's surface. A partial solar eclipse, on the other hand, is visible over a surrounding region thousands of kilometres wide in areas where the non-central shadow falls.

Southeast Asia gets a moderate number solar eclipse events, however not every country will get to experience the same type of eclipse since the path of totality is only thin compared to the vastness of earth's surface. For example, a total solar eclipse from Indonesia may only appear as partial from the Philippines if the path of totality misses the archipelago.

Due to its location and relatively small size, a view of totality within the Philippines is a rare experience. There are only 7 recorded events from the 20th century in which the central path of solar eclipse crosses the official territory and predictions suggest that the frequency of occurrence will be the close to that amount for the 21st century.

== Nineteenth century ==
August 28, 1802	June 26, 1824	July 8, 1842	August 18, 1868
December 12, 1871	April 6, 1875	May 17, 1882	August 19, 1887
August 9, 1896	January 22, 1898		

== Twentieth century ==
=== Total solar eclipses ===
This lists the eclipses where the totality was visible from the Philippines.

January 14, 1926	May 9, 1929	June 20, 1955	March 18, 1988
October 24, 1995

=== Annular solar eclipses ===
November 11, 1901	March 17, 1904	October 22, 1911	July 20, 1944

=== Partial solar eclipses ===
Solar eclipses that were seen from the Philippines where the moon partially covered the sun.

May 18, 1901	March 29, 1903	January 14, 1907	June 17, 1909
February 14, 1915	July 30, 1916	September 21, 1922	August 21, 1933
February 14, 1934	June 19, 1936	September 21, 1941	May 9, 1948
February 14, 1953	December 14, 1955	April 19, 1958	February 5, 1962
November 23, 1965	March 18, 1969	June 11, 1983	September 23, 1987
January 4, 1992	March 9, 1997	August 22, 1998	February 16, 1999

== Twenty-first century ==
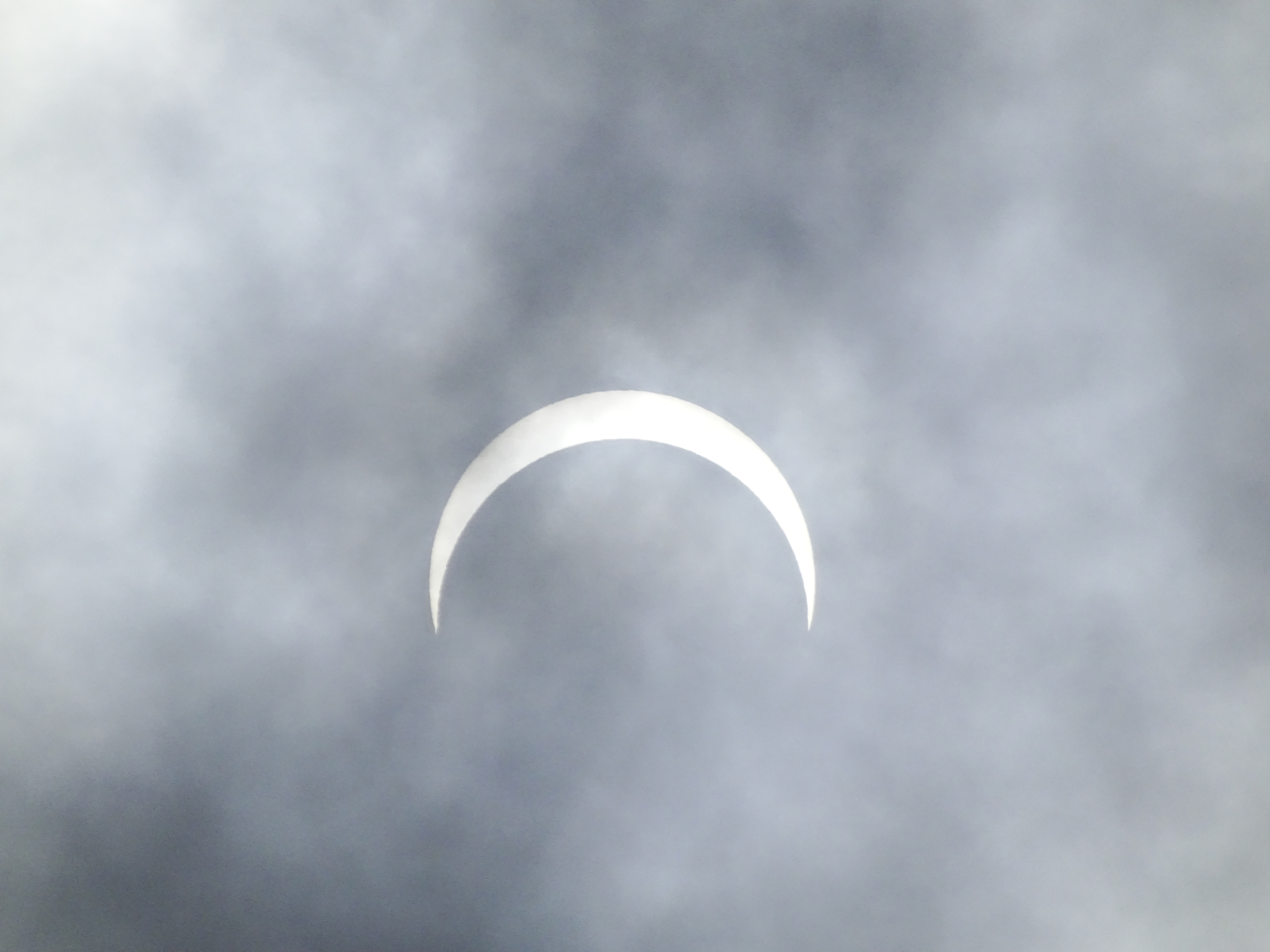
December 2019 solar eclipse, as seen partial from Digos, Davao del Sur

=== Total solar eclipses ===
Total solar eclipses that are seen and will be seen on the archipelago.

April 20, 2042	August 24, 2082	May 22, 2096

=== Annular solar eclipses ===
Annular solar eclipses where the annulus (ring) will be visible on some parts of the country.

December 26, 2019	February 28, 2063	July 24, 2074	November 15, 2096

=== Partial solar eclipses ===
Solar eclipses visible as partial on the country for the 21st century

June 10, 2002	July 22, 2009	January 15, 2010	May 20, 2012
May 10, 2013	March 9, 2016	June 21, 2020	April 20, 2023
July 22, 2028	June 1, 2030	May 21, 2031	November 3, 2032
September 2, 2035	July 13, 2037	December 26, 2038	October 25, 2041
October 14, 2042	January 26, 2047	November 25, 2049	September 22, 2052
March 20, 2053	July 1, 2057	September 3, 2062	August 24, 2063
February 17, 2064	May 31, 2068	April 11, 2070	January 27, 2074
May 22, 2077	September 3, 2081	June 22, 2085	December 6, 2086
October 4, 2089	November 27, 2095		

== Twenty-second century ==
February 28, 2101	July 15, 2102	December 29, 2103	April 23, 2107
February 18, 2110	April 2, 2117	March 22, 2118	July 4, 2122
May 14, 2124	March 1, 2128	August 26, 2128	August 15, 2129
October 7, 2135	June 25, 2150	July 5, 2168	

== External Sources ==
- Solar and Lunar Eclipses in the Philippines by timaanddate.com
