= Eclipse of the Sun (disambiguation) =

An eclipse of the Sun occurs when a portion of the Earth is engulfed in a shadow cast by the Moon.

Eclipse of the Sun may also refer to:

- Eclipse of the Sun (Grosz), a 1926 painting by George Grosz
- Eclipse of the Sun (film), a 1943 Argentine film
- Eclipse of the Sun (novel), a 1997 novel by Phil Whitaker

== See also ==
- Total Eclipse of the Sun, a 1999 EP by Einstürzende Neubauten
- Total Eclipse of The Sun, a boycott against The Sun newspaper for their coverage of the Hillsborough disaster
- Solar eclipse (disambiguation)
- List of solar eclipses
