= Solar eclipse of December 16, 2085 =

Future annular solar eclipse

- Annular eclipse
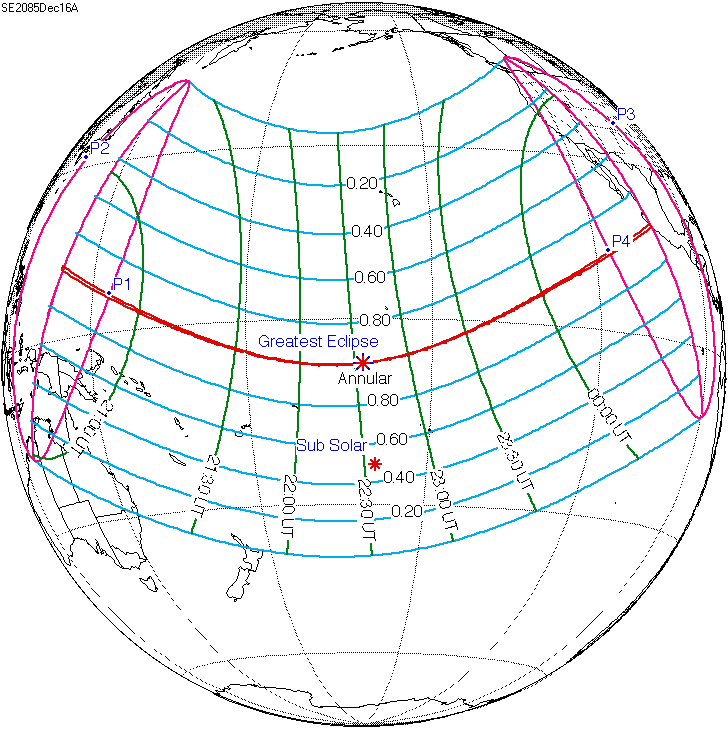
- Map
- Gamma: 0.2786
- Magnitude: 0.9971

Maximum eclipse
- Duration: 19 s (0 min 19 s)
- Coordinates: 7.3°S 160.8°W
- Max. width of band: 10 km (6.2 mi)

Times (UTC)
- Greatest eclipse: 22:37:48

References
- Saros: 143 (27 of 72)
- Catalog # (SE5000): 9700

An annular solar eclipse will occur at the Moon's ascending node of orbit between Sunday, December 16 and Monday, December 17, 2085, with a magnitude of 0.9971. A solar eclipse occurs when the Moon passes between Earth and the Sun, thereby totally or partly obscuring the image of the Sun for a viewer on Earth. An annular solar eclipse occurs when the Moon's apparent diameter is smaller than the Sun's, blocking most of the Sun's light and causing the Sun to look like an annulus (ring). An annular eclipse appears as a partial eclipse over a region of the Earth thousands of kilometres wide. Occurring about 3.7 days before perigee (on December 20, 2085, at 14:40 UTC), the Moon's apparent diameter will be larger.

The path of annularity will be visible from parts of Micronesia and southwestern Mexico. A partial solar eclipse will also be visible for parts of northern Australia, Oceania, Hawaii, and western North America.

== Eclipse details ==
Shown below are two tables displaying details about this particular solar eclipse. The first table outlines times at which the Moon's penumbra or umbra attains the specific parameter, and the second table describes various other parameters pertaining to this eclipse.

December 16, 2085 Solar Eclipse Times
Event	Time (UTC)
First Penumbral External Contact	2085 December 16 at 19:52:02.9 UTC
First Umbral External Contact	2085 December 16 at 20:52:55.2 UTC
First Central Line	2085 December 16 at 20:53:32.4 UTC
Greatest Duration	2085 December 16 at 20:53:32.4 UTC
First Umbral Internal Contact	2085 December 16 at 20:54:09.7 UTC
First Penumbral Internal Contact	2085 December 16 at 21:59:46.9 UTC
Greatest Eclipse	2085 December 16 at 22:37:47.8 UTC
Equatorial Conjunction	2085 December 16 at 22:39:48.7 UTC
Ecliptic Conjunction	2085 December 16 at 22:40:48.4 UTC
Last Penumbral Internal Contact	2085 December 16 at 23:15:46.8 UTC
Last Umbral Internal Contact	2085 December 17 at 00:21:26.6 UTC
Last Central Line	2085 December 17 at 00:22:01.1 UTC
Last Umbral External Contact	2085 December 17 at 00:22:35.6 UTC
Last Penumbral External Contact	2085 December 17 at 01:23:25.8 UTC

December 16, 2085 Solar Eclipse Parameters
Parameter	Value
Eclipse Magnitude	0.99714
Eclipse Obscuration	0.99428
Gamma	0.27864
Sun Right Ascension	17h41m09.8s
Sun Declination	-23°21'25.3"
Sun Semi-Diameter	16'15.0"
Sun Equatorial Horizontal Parallax	08.9"
Moon Right Ascension	17h41m05.1s
Moon Declination	-23°05'11.3"
Moon Semi-Diameter	15'57.1"
Moon Equatorial Horizontal Parallax	0°58'32.5"
ΔT	110.5 s

== Eclipse season ==
This eclipse is part of an eclipse season, a period, roughly every six months, when eclipses occur. Only two (or occasionally three) eclipse seasons occur each year, and each season lasts about 35 days and repeats just short of six months (173 days) later; thus two full eclipse seasons always occur each year. Either two or three eclipses happen each eclipse season. In the sequence below, each eclipse is separated by a fortnight.

Eclipse season of December 2085
December 1 Descending node (full moon)	December 16 Ascending node (new moon)
Penumbral lunar eclipse Lunar Saros 117	Annular solar eclipse Solar Saros 143

== Related eclipses ==
=== Eclipses in 2085 ===
- A penumbral lunar eclipse on January 10.
- A penumbral lunar eclipse on June 8.
- An annular solar eclipse on June 22.
- A penumbral lunar eclipse on July 7.
- A penumbral lunar eclipse on December 1.
- An annular solar eclipse on December 16.

=== Metonic ===
- Preceded by: Solar eclipse of February 27, 2082
- Followed by: Solar eclipse of October 4, 2089

=== Tzolkinex ===
- Preceded by: Solar eclipse of November 4, 2078
- Followed by: Solar eclipse of January 27, 2093

=== Half-Saros ===
- Preceded by: Lunar eclipse of December 10, 2076
- Followed by: Lunar eclipse of December 21, 2094

=== Tritos ===
- Preceded by: Solar eclipse of January 16, 2075
- Followed by: Solar eclipse of November 15, 2096

=== Solar Saros 143 ===
- Preceded by: Solar eclipse of December 6, 2067
- Followed by: Solar eclipse of December 29, 2103

=== Inex ===
- Preceded by: Solar eclipse of January 5, 2057
- Followed by: Solar eclipse of November 27, 2114

=== Triad ===
- Preceded by: Solar eclipse of February 16, 1999
- Followed by: Solar eclipse of October 17, 2172

=== Solar eclipses of 2083–2087 ===
This eclipse is a member of a semester series. An eclipse in a semester series of solar eclipses repeats approximately every 177 days and 4 hours (a semester) at alternating nodes of the Moon's orbit.

The partial solar eclipses on February 16, 2083 and August 13, 2083 occur in the previous lunar year eclipse set, and the partial solar eclipses on May 2, 2087 and October 26, 2087 occur in the next lunar year eclipse set.

Solar eclipse series sets from 2083 to 2087
Descending node			Ascending node		
Saros	Map	Gamma	Saros	Map	Gamma
118	July 15, 2083 Partial	1.5465	123	January 7, 2084 Partial	−1.0715
128	July 3, 2084 Annular	0.8208	133	December 27, 2084 Total	−0.4094
138	June 22, 2085 Annular	0.0452	143	December 16, 2085 Annular	0.2786
148	June 11, 2086 Total	−0.7215	153	December 6, 2086 Partial	1.0194
158	June 1, 2087 Partial	−1.4186			

=== Saros 143 ===
This eclipse is a part of Saros series 143, repeating every 18 years, 11 days, and containing 72 events. The series started with a partial solar eclipse on March 7, 1617. It contains total eclipses from June 24, 1797 through October 24, 1995; hybrid eclipses from November 3, 2013 through December 6, 2067; and annular eclipses from December 16, 2085 through September 16, 2536. The series ends at member 72 as a partial eclipse on April 23, 2897. Its eclipses are tabulated in three columns; every third eclipse in the same column is one exeligmos apart, so they all cast shadows over approximately the same parts of the Earth.

The longest duration of totality was produced by member 16 at 3 minutes, 50 seconds on August 19, 1887, and the longest duration of annularity will be produced by member 51 at 4 minutes, 54 seconds on September 6, 2518. All eclipses in this series occur at the Moon’s ascending node of orbit.

Series members 12–33 occur between 1801 and 2200:
12	13	14
July 6, 1815	July 17, 1833	July 28, 1851
15	16	17
August 7, 1869	August 19, 1887	August 30, 1905
18	19	20
September 10, 1923	September 21, 1941	October 2, 1959
21	22	23
October 12, 1977	October 24, 1995	November 3, 2013
24	25	26
November 14, 2031	November 25, 2049	December 6, 2067
27	28	29
December 16, 2085	December 29, 2103	January 8, 2122
30	31	32
January 20, 2140	January 30, 2158	February 10, 2176
33
February 21, 2194

=== Metonic series ===
The metonic series repeats eclipses every 19 years (6939.69 days), lasting about 5 cycles. Eclipses occur in nearly the same calendar date. In addition, the octon subseries repeats 1/5 of that or every 3.8 years (1387.94 days). All eclipses in this table occur at the Moon's ascending node.

21 eclipse events between July 23, 2036 and July 23, 2112
July 23–24	May 11	February 27–28	December 16–17	October 4–5
117	119	121	123	125
July 23, 2036	May 11, 2040	February 28, 2044	December 16, 2047	October 4, 2051
127	129	131	133	135
July 24, 2055	May 11, 2059	February 28, 2063	December 17, 2066	October 4, 2070
137	139	141	143	145
July 24, 2074	May 11, 2078	February 27, 2082	December 16, 2085	October 4, 2089
147	149	151	153	155
July 23, 2093	May 11, 2097	February 28, 2101	December 17, 2104	October 5, 2108
157
July 23, 2112

=== Tritos series ===
This eclipse is a part of a tritos cycle, repeating at alternating nodes every 135 synodic months (≈ 3986.63 days, or 11 years minus 1 month). Their appearance and longitude are irregular due to a lack of synchronization with the anomalistic month (period of perigee), but groupings of 3 tritos cycles (≈ 33 years minus 3 months) come close (≈ 434.044 anomalistic months), so eclipses are similar in these groupings.

Series members between 1801 and 2200
March 4, 1802 (Saros 117)	February 1, 1813 (Saros 118)	January 1, 1824 (Saros 119)	November 30, 1834 (Saros 120)	October 30, 1845 (Saros 121)
September 29, 1856 (Saros 122)	August 29, 1867 (Saros 123)	July 29, 1878 (Saros 124)	June 28, 1889 (Saros 125)	May 28, 1900 (Saros 126)
April 28, 1911 (Saros 127)	March 28, 1922 (Saros 128)	February 24, 1933 (Saros 129)	January 25, 1944 (Saros 130)	December 25, 1954 (Saros 131)
November 23, 1965 (Saros 132)	October 23, 1976 (Saros 133)	September 23, 1987 (Saros 134)	August 22, 1998 (Saros 135)	July 22, 2009 (Saros 136)
June 21, 2020 (Saros 137)	May 21, 2031 (Saros 138)	April 20, 2042 (Saros 139)	March 20, 2053 (Saros 140)	February 17, 2064 (Saros 141)
January 16, 2075 (Saros 142)	December 16, 2085 (Saros 143)	November 15, 2096 (Saros 144)	October 16, 2107 (Saros 145)	September 15, 2118 (Saros 146)
August 15, 2129 (Saros 147)	July 14, 2140 (Saros 148)	June 14, 2151 (Saros 149)	May 14, 2162 (Saros 150)	April 12, 2173 (Saros 151)
March 12, 2184 (Saros 152)	February 10, 2195 (Saros 153)			

=== Inex series ===
This eclipse is a part of the long period inex cycle, repeating at alternating nodes, every 358 synodic months (≈ 10,571.95 days, or 29 years minus 20 days). Their appearance and longitude are irregular due to a lack of synchronization with the anomalistic month (period of perigee). However, groupings of 3 inex cycles (≈ 87 years minus 2 months) comes close (≈ 1,151.02 anomalistic months), so eclipses are similar in these groupings.

Series members between 1801 and 2200
June 16, 1825 (Saros 134)	May 26, 1854 (Saros 135)	May 6, 1883 (Saros 136)
April 17, 1912 (Saros 137)	March 27, 1941 (Saros 138)	March 7, 1970 (Saros 139)
February 16, 1999 (Saros 140)	January 26, 2028 (Saros 141)	January 5, 2057 (Saros 142)
December 16, 2085 (Saros 143)	November 27, 2114 (Saros 144)	November 7, 2143 (Saros 145)
October 17, 2172 (Saros 146)		
