= Solar eclipse of March 31, 2090 =

Future partial solar eclipse

- Partial eclipse
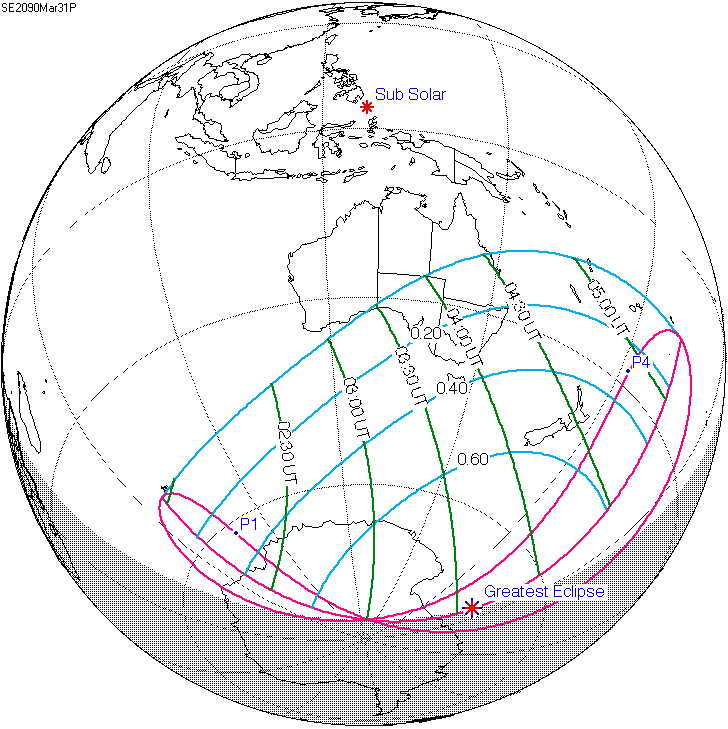
- Map
- Gamma: −1.1028
- Magnitude: 0.7843

Maximum eclipse
- Coordinates: 72.1°S 156.3°W

Times (UTC)
- Greatest eclipse: 3:38:08

References
- Saros: 150 (21 of 71)
- Catalog # (SE5000): 9710

A partial solar eclipse will occur at the Moon's descending node of orbit on Friday, March 31, 2090, with a magnitude of 0.7843. A solar eclipse occurs when the Moon passes between Earth and the Sun, thereby totally or partly obscuring the image of the Sun for a viewer on Earth. A partial solar eclipse occurs in the polar regions of the Earth when the center of the Moon's shadow misses the Earth.

The partial solar eclipse will be visible for parts of Antarctica, southeastern Australia, and Oceania.

== Eclipse details ==
Shown below are two tables displaying details about this particular solar eclipse. The first table outlines times at which the Moon's penumbra or umbra attains the specific parameter, and the second table describes various other parameters pertaining to this eclipse.

March 31, 2090 Solar Eclipse Times
Event	Time (UTC)
First Penumbral External Contact	2090 March 31 at 01:27:45.4 UTC
Equatorial Conjunction	2090 March 31 at 02:57:30.3 UTC
Greatest Eclipse	2090 March 31 at 03:38:07.9 UTC
Ecliptic Conjunction	2090 March 31 at 03:50:52.7 UTC
Last Penumbral External Contact	2090 March 31 at 05:48:45.4 UTC

March 31, 2090 Solar Eclipse Parameters
Parameter	Value
Eclipse Magnitude	0.78428
Eclipse Obscuration	0.70680
Gamma	−1.10277
Sun Right Ascension	00h40m11.0s
Sun Declination	+04°19'18.8"
Sun Semi-Diameter	16'00.8"
Sun Equatorial Horizontal Parallax	08.8"
Moon Right Ascension	00h41m23.0s
Moon Declination	+03°22'02.4"
Moon Semi-Diameter	14'52.2"
Moon Equatorial Horizontal Parallax	0°54'34.6"
ΔT	114.3 s

== Eclipse season ==
This eclipse is part of an eclipse season, a period, roughly every six months, when eclipses occur. Only two (or occasionally three) eclipse seasons occur each year, and each season lasts about 35 days and repeats just short of six months (173 days) later; thus two full eclipse seasons always occur each year. Either two or three eclipses happen each eclipse season. In the sequence below, each eclipse is separated by a fortnight.

Eclipse season of March 2090
March 15 Ascending node (full moon)	March 31 Descending node (new moon)
Total lunar eclipse Lunar Saros 124	Partial solar eclipse Solar Saros 150

== Related eclipses ==
=== Eclipses in 2090 ===
- A total lunar eclipse on March 15.
- A partial solar eclipse on March 31.
- A total lunar eclipse on September 8.
- A total solar eclipse on September 23.

=== Metonic ===
- Preceded by: Solar eclipse of June 11, 2086
- Followed by: Solar eclipse of January 16, 2094

=== Tzolkinex ===
- Preceded by: Solar eclipse of February 16, 2083
- Followed by: Solar eclipse of May 11, 2097

=== Half-Saros ===
- Preceded by: Lunar eclipse of March 25, 2081
- Followed by: Lunar eclipse of April 5, 2099

=== Tritos ===
- Preceded by: Solar eclipse of May 1, 2079
- Followed by: Solar eclipse of February 28, 2101

=== Solar Saros 150 ===
- Preceded by: Solar eclipse of March 19, 2072
- Followed by: Solar eclipse of April 11, 2108

=== Inex ===
- Preceded by: Solar eclipse of April 20, 2061
- Followed by: Solar eclipse of March 11, 2119

=== Triad ===
- Preceded by: Solar eclipse of May 31, 2003
- Followed by: Solar eclipse of January 29, 2177

=== Solar eclipses of 2087–2090 ===
This eclipse is a member of a semester series. An eclipse in a semester series of solar eclipses repeats approximately every 177 days and 4 hours (a semester) at alternating nodes of the Moon's orbit.

The partial solar eclipse on June 1, 2087 occurs in the previous lunar year eclipse set.

Solar eclipse series sets from 2087 to 2090
Descending node			Ascending node		
Saros	Map	Gamma	Saros	Map	Gamma
120	May 2, 2087 Partial	1.1139	125	October 26, 2087 Partial	−1.2882
130	April 21, 2088 Total	0.4135	135	October 14, 2088 Annular	−0.5349
140	April 10, 2089 Annular	−0.3319	145	October 4, 2089 Total	0.2167
150	March 31, 2090 Partial	−1.1028	155	September 23, 2090 Total	0.9157

=== Saros 150 ===
This eclipse is a part of Saros series 150, repeating every 18 years, 11 days, and containing 71 events. The series started with a partial solar eclipse on August 24, 1729. It contains annular eclipses from April 22, 2126 through June 22, 2829. There are no hybrid or total eclipses in this set. The series ends at member 71 as a partial eclipse on September 29, 2991. Its eclipses are tabulated in three columns; every third eclipse in the same column is one exeligmos apart, so they all cast shadows over approximately the same parts of the Earth.

The longest duration of annularity will be produced by member 45 at 9 minutes, 58 seconds on December 19, 2522. All eclipses in this series occur at the Moon’s descending node of orbit.

Series members 5–27 occur between 1801 and 2200:
5	6	7
October 7, 1801	October 19, 1819	October 29, 1837
8	9	10
November 9, 1855	November 20, 1873	December 1, 1891
11	12	13
December 12, 1909	December 24, 1927	January 3, 1946
14	15	16
January 14, 1964	January 25, 1982	February 5, 2000
17	18	19
February 15, 2018	February 27, 2036	March 9, 2054
20	21	22
March 19, 2072	March 31, 2090	April 11, 2108
23	24	25
April 22, 2126	May 3, 2144	May 14, 2162
26	27	
May 24, 2180	June 4, 2198	

=== Metonic series ===
The metonic series repeats eclipses every 19 years (6939.69 days), lasting about 5 cycles. Eclipses occur in nearly the same calendar date. In addition, the octon subseries repeats 1/5 of that or every 3.8 years (1387.94 days). All eclipses in this table occur at the Moon's descending node.

22 eclipse events between June 12, 2029 and November 4, 2116
June 11–12	March 30–31	January 16	November 4–5	August 23–24
118	120	122	124	126
June 12, 2029	March 30, 2033	January 16, 2037	November 4, 2040	August 23, 2044
128	130	132	134	136
June 11, 2048	March 30, 2052	January 16, 2056	November 5, 2059	August 24, 2063
138	140	142	144	146
June 11, 2067	March 31, 2071	January 16, 2075	November 4, 2078	August 24, 2082
148	150	152	154	156
June 11, 2086	March 31, 2090	January 16, 2094	November 4, 2097	August 24, 2101
158	160	162	164	
June 12, 2105			November 4, 2116	

=== Tritos series ===
This eclipse is a part of a tritos cycle, repeating at alternating nodes every 135 synodic months (≈ 3986.63 days, or 11 years minus 1 month). Their appearance and longitude are irregular due to a lack of synchronization with the anomalistic month (period of perigee), but groupings of 3 tritos cycles (≈ 33 years minus 3 months) come close (≈ 434.044 anomalistic months), so eclipses are similar in these groupings.

Series members between 1801 and 2200
June 16, 1806 (Saros 124)	May 16, 1817 (Saros 125)	April 14, 1828 (Saros 126)	March 15, 1839 (Saros 127)	February 12, 1850 (Saros 128)
January 11, 1861 (Saros 129)	December 12, 1871 (Saros 130)	November 10, 1882 (Saros 131)	October 9, 1893 (Saros 132)	September 9, 1904 (Saros 133)
August 10, 1915 (Saros 134)	July 9, 1926 (Saros 135)	June 8, 1937 (Saros 136)	May 9, 1948 (Saros 137)	April 8, 1959 (Saros 138)
March 7, 1970 (Saros 139)	February 4, 1981 (Saros 140)	January 4, 1992 (Saros 141)	December 4, 2002 (Saros 142)	November 3, 2013 (Saros 143)
October 2, 2024 (Saros 144)	September 2, 2035 (Saros 145)	August 2, 2046 (Saros 146)	July 1, 2057 (Saros 147)	May 31, 2068 (Saros 148)
May 1, 2079 (Saros 149)	March 31, 2090 (Saros 150)	February 28, 2101 (Saros 151)	January 29, 2112 (Saros 152)	December 28, 2122 (Saros 153)
November 26, 2133 (Saros 154)	October 26, 2144 (Saros 155)	September 26, 2155 (Saros 156)	August 25, 2166 (Saros 157)	July 25, 2177 (Saros 158)
June 24, 2188 (Saros 159)	May 24, 2199 (Saros 160)			

=== Inex series ===
This eclipse is a part of the long period inex cycle, repeating at alternating nodes, every 358 synodic months (≈ 10,571.95 days, or 29 years minus 20 days). Their appearance and longitude are irregular due to a lack of synchronization with the anomalistic month (period of perigee). However, groupings of 3 inex cycles (≈ 87 years minus 2 months) comes close (≈ 1,151.02 anomalistic months), so eclipses are similar in these groupings.

Series members between 1801 and 2200
September 28, 1829 (Saros 141)	September 7, 1858 (Saros 142)	August 19, 1887 (Saros 143)
July 30, 1916 (Saros 144)	July 9, 1945 (Saros 145)	June 20, 1974 (Saros 146)
May 31, 2003 (Saros 147)	May 9, 2032 (Saros 148)	April 20, 2061 (Saros 149)
March 31, 2090 (Saros 150)	March 11, 2119 (Saros 151)	February 19, 2148 (Saros 152)
January 29, 2177 (Saros 153)		
