= List of solar eclipses in the 16th century =

This is a list of solar eclipses in the 16th century. During the period 1501 to 1600 there were 228 solar eclipses of which 75 were partial, 72 were annular (three non-central), 62 were total, and 19 were hybrids. The greatest number of eclipses in one year was four, occurring in 1508, 1526, 1573, and 1591. Note that dates before October 4, 1582 use the Julian calendar and dates after October 15, 1582 use the Gregorian calendar (October 4, 1582 is followed by October 15 in the Gregorian calendar).

Date	Time of greatest eclipse	Saros cycle	Type	Magnitude	Central duration	Location	Path width	Geographical area	Ref(s)
17 April 1501	16:15:52	101	Partial	0.6155	—	61.9°S 1.1°W	—		
17 May 1501	03:27:44	139	Partial	0.0905	—	63.7°N 13.6°W	—		
12 October 1501	07:30:04	106	Partial	0.6585	—	61.4°N 133.9°E	—		
7 April 1502	05:49:59	111	Total	1.0567	04m 49s	12.6°S 104.7°E	205 km (127 mi)		
1 October 1502	08:36:17	116	Annular	0.9277	08m 16s	19.3°N 62.8°E	306 km (190 mi)		
27 March 1503	22:28:20	121	Total	1.0640	05m 04s	21.1°N 164.1°W	218 km (135 mi)		
20 September 1503	08:52:38	126	Annular	0.9494	05m 27s	14.1°S 38.5°E	190 km (120 mi)		
16 March 1504	13:30:09	131	Partial	0.9348	—	61.0°N 114.0°W	—		
8 September 1504	15:12:15	136	Annular	0.9924	00m 32s	55.3°S 102.6°W	83 km (52 mi)		
4 February 1505	06:29:08	103	Partial	0.8255	—	61.7°S 156.9°W	—		
30 July 1505	20:51:55	108	Total	1.0635	03m 25s	67.9°N 55.6°W	593 km (368 mi)		
24 January 1506	05:58:07	113	Annular	0.9209	08m 26s	38.3°S 106.1°E	325 km (202 mi)		
20 July 1506	13:46:58	118	Total	1.0623	05m 08s	30.4°N 19.8°W	209 km (130 mi)		
13 January 1507	07:20:10	123	Annular	0.9526	05m 42s	3.0°S 68.3°E	181 km (112 mi)		
10 July 1507	03:06:33	128	Hybrid	1.0095	01m 01s	12.4°S 126.0°E	40 km (25 mi)		
2 January 1508	15:45:09	133	Annular	0.9941	00m 28s	52.8°N 77.0°W	92 km (57 mi)		
29 May 1508	19:09:02	100	Partial	0.2019	—	67.1°N 72.8°E	—		
28 July 1508	09:28:44	138	Partial	0.2993	—	64.5°S 10.4°E	—		
22 November 1508	19:24:23	105	Partial	0.8489	—	67.8°S 74.6°E	—		
18 May 1509	19:49:36	110	Annular	0.9539	03m 56s	64.9°N 124.3°W	233 km (145 mi)		
12 November 1509	10:00:15	115	Hybrid	1.0131	01m 06s	45.8°S 23.2°E	50 km (31 mi)		
8 May 1510	01:16:15	120	Hybrid	1.0033	00m 22s	13.5°N 161.4°E	12 km (7.5 mi)		
1 November 1510	19:13:50	125	Annular	0.9607	04m 54s	1.5°S 108.7°W	148 km (92 mi)		
27 April 1511	13:47:24	130	Total	1.0463	03m 50s	40.0°S 14.7°W	286 km (178 mi)		
21 October 1511	21:19:49	135	Annular	0.9416	—	70.7°N 98.6°W	—		
17 March 1512	22:14:35	102	Partial	0.9516	—	72.0°N 110.2°E	—		
16 April 1512	06:22:25	140	Partial	0.0003	—	70.6°S 131.9°E	—		
10 September 1512	05:03:25	107	Partial	0.5688	—	72.0°S 17.4°E	—		
7 March 1513	11:54:03	112	Hybrid	1.0040	00m 24s	17.6°N 1.8°W	15 km (9.3 mi)		
30 August 1513	13:35:52	117	Total	1.0211	02m 03s	19.5°S 31.9°W	80 km (50 mi)		
24 February 1514	18:45:30	122	Annular	0.9479	05m 51s	28.2°S 90.0°W	208 km (129 mi)		
20 August 1514	04:25:15	127	Total	1.0667	05m 38s	26.5°N 119.9°E	228 km (142 mi)		
13 February 1515	19:08:19	132	Partial	0.7580	—	71.5°S 18.9°E	—		
11 July 1515	13:36:51	99	Partial	0.0153	—	68.5°S 38.2°W	—		
9 August 1515	21:21:25	137	Partial	0.9686	—	70.8°N 7.1°W	—		
4 January 1516	03:38:41	104	Partial	0.6830	—	68.1°N 117.7°E	—		
30 July 1516	01:15:15	109	Annular	0.9899	01m 03s	33.8°S 161.3°E	64 km (40 mi)		
23 December 1516	14:00:51	114	Total	1.0199	02m 05s	2.2°N 27.9°W	75 km (47 mi)		
19 July 1517	05:41:31	119	Annular	0.9552	05m 50s	19.5°N 96.1°E	164 km (102 mi)		
13 December 1517	05:04:13	124	Total	1.0468	03m 52s	38.2°S 103.0°E	161 km (100 mi)		
8 July 1518	06:15:24	129	Annular	0.9496	04m 13s	67.0°N 73.4°E	259 km (161 mi)		
2 December 1518	20:14:58	134	Total	1.0124	00m 41s	80.4°S 128.7°E	125 km (78 mi)		
28 April 1519	23:35:43	101	Partial	0.5070	—	62.5°S 120.2°W	—		
28 May 1519	10:20:09	139	Partial	0.2342	—	64.6°N 126.3°W	—		
23 October 1519	15:20:34	106	Partial	0.6096	—	61.9°N 7.4°E	—		
17 April 1520	13:36:46	111	Total	1.0609	05m 15s	12.6°S 12.2°W	226 km (140 mi)		
11 October 1520	16:03:20	116	Annular	0.9244	08m 57s	17.8°N 49.4°W	329 km (204 mi)		
7 April 1521	06:26:06	121	Total	1.0662	05m 15s	22.8°N 77.3°E	222 km (138 mi)		
30 September 1521	16:21:42	126	Annular	0.9489	05m 30s	16.2°S 73.3°W	191 km (119 mi)		
27 March 1522	21:22:59	131	Total	1.0076	00m 26s	62.0°N 127.7°E	347 km (216 mi)		
19 September 1522	22:57:33	136	Annular	0.9946	00m 23s	53.9°S 146.1°E	42 km (26 mi)		
15 February 1523	14:16:44	103	Partial	0.7827	—	61.2°S 77.4°E	—		
11 August 1523	04:33:16	108	Total	1.0558	02m 44s	62.7°N 135.9°W	—		
4 February 1524	13:45:35	113	Annular	0.9235	08m 05s	35.4°S 9.3°W	315 km (196 mi)		
30 July 1524	21:17:39	118	Total	1.0577	04m 40s	30.8°N 130.2°W	198 km (123 mi)		
23 January 1525	15:31:21	123	Annular	0.9569	04m 58s	1.2°S 54.8°W	163 km (101 mi)		
20 July 1525	10:11:04	128	Hybrid	1.0054	00m 35s	9.3°S 19.4°E	21 km (13 mi)		
13 January 1526	00:22:31	133	Annular	0.9985	00m 07s	51.0°N 148.8°E	19 km (12 mi)		
10 July 1526	01:34:33	100	Partial	0.0557	—	66.1°N 34.1°W	—		
9 July 1526	16:02:42	138	Partial	0.4379	—	63.6°S 97.8°W	—		
4 December 1526	04:14:39	105	Partial	0.8382	—	66.7°S 68.9°W	—		
30 May 1527	02:23:01	110	Annular	0.9556	03m 28s	73.4°N 144.6°E	255 km (158 mi)		
23 November 1527	18:36:38	115	Hybrid	1.0089	00m 45s	48.6°S 102.5°W	34 km (21 mi)		
18 May 1528	08:21:05	120	Hybrid	1.0085	00m 56s	19.9°N 54.6°E	29 km (18 mi)		
12 November 1528	03:22:58	125	Annular	0.9562	05m 36s	4.9°S 128.4°E	166 km (103 mi)		
7 May 1529	21:19:50	130	Total	1.0526	04m 38s	31.3°S 133.1°W	276 km (171 mi)		
1 November 1529	05:04:11	135	Annular	0.9119	08m 09s	61.7°N 122.8°E	—		
29 March 1530	06:16:37	102	Partial	0.8671	—	71.7°N 24.4°W	—		
27 April 1530	14:07:20	140	Partial	0.1083	—	69.9°S 2.9°E	—		
21 September 1530	12:31:37	107	Partial	0.4970	—	72.0°S 108.9°W	—		
18 March 1531	19:47:21	112	Hybrid	1.0036	00m 21s	24.3°N 122.1°W	13 km (8.1 mi)		
10 September 1531	21:21:52	117	Total	1.0208	01m 56s	26.4°S 151.0°W	81 km (50 mi)		
7 March 1532	02:21:40	122	Annular	0.9488	05m 59s	21.8°S 154.3°E	201 km (125 mi)		
30 August 1532	12:17:45	127	Total	1.0654	05m 40s	19.3°N 0.0°E	221 km (137 mi)		
24 February 1533	02:42:10	132	Partial	0.8077	—	71.9°S 108.5°W	—		
20 August 1533	05:04:01	137	Total	1.0479	02m 40s	73.7°N 178.3°E	678 km (421 mi)		
14 January 1534	12:01:19	104	Partial	0.6778	—	69.1°N 19.7°W	—		
11 July 1534	08:08:46	109	Annular	0.9833	01m 35s	44.9°S 52.5°E	144 km (89 mi)		
3 January 1535	22:45:49	114	Total	1.0228	02m 22s	3.8°N 160.1°W	86 km (53 mi)		
30 July 1535	12:08:20	119	Annular	0.9533	06m 19s	13.5°N 0.6°W	173 km (107 mi)		
24 December 1535	13:56:57	124	Total	1.0469	03m 55s	37.5°S 27.4°W	161 km (100 mi)		
18 July 1536	12:43:21	129	Annular	0.9523	04m 17s	61.0°N 13.4°W	220 km (140 mi)		
13 December 1536	04:59:20	134	Total	1.0098	00m 33s	84.5°S 17.2°W	97 km (60 mi)		
9 May 1537	06:52:57	101	Partial	0.3922	—	63.2°S 121.2°E	—		
7 July 1537	17:14:05	139	Partial	0.3796	—	65.5°N 120.2°E	—		
2 November 1537	23:17:01	106	Partial	0.5712	—	62.6°N 120.7°W	—		
28 April 1538	21:17:31	111	Total	1.0645	05m 38s	13.7°S 127.7°W	249 km (155 mi)		
22 October 1538	23:38:41	116	Annular	0.9214	09m 41s	16.6°N 164.1°W	351 km (218 mi)		
18 April 1539	14:15:07	121	Total	1.0680	05m 28s	23.7°N 38.7°W	225 km (140 mi)		
12 October 1539	00:01:45	126	Annular	0.9484	05m 35s	18.7°S 172.2°E	192 km (119 mi)		
7 April 1540	05:04:30	131	Total	1.0115	00m 42s	63.1°N 34.7°E	123 km (76 mi)		
30 September 1540	06:54:11	136	Annular	0.9960	00m 17s	54.6°S 29.2°E	27 km (17 mi)		
25 February 1541	21:54:42	103	Partial	0.7272	—	61.0°S 45.8°W	—		
21 August 1541	12:20:07	108	Partial	0.9172	—	61.3°N 102.0°E	—		
19 September 1541	20:34:01	146	Partial	0.0378	—	61.1°S 135.3°E	—		
14 February 1542	21:27:23	113	Annular	0.9265	07m 44s	32.5°S 123.8°W	305 km (190 mi)		
11 August 1542	04:51:06	118	Total	1.0525	04m 12s	30.6°N 118.6°E	184 km (114 mi)		
3 February 1543	23:38:52	123	Annular	0.9617	04m 14s	1.0°N 177.0°W	143 km (89 mi)		
31 July 1543	17:16:23	128	Hybrid	1.0007	00m 05s	7.3°S 87.0°W	3 km (1.9 mi)		
24 January 1544	08:57:45	133	Hybrid	1.0035	00m 16s	49.7°N 16.0°E	40 km (25 mi)		
19 July 1544	22:38:22	138	Partial	0.5730	—	62.8°S 153.9°E	—		
14 December 1544	13:06:28	105	Partial	0.8297	—	65.6°S 147.6°E	—		
9 July 1545	08:57:28	110	Annular	0.9567	03m 06s	81.2°N 72.0°E	303 km (188 mi)		
4 December 1545	03:15:42	115	Hybrid	1.0051	00m 25s	50.1°S 132.1°E	20 km (12 mi)		
29 May 1546	15:24:40	120	Hybrid	1.0133	01m 24s	25.7°N 51.0°W	46 km (29 mi)		
23 November 1546	11:35:42	125	Annular	0.9521	06m 13s	7.3°S 4.9°E	181 km (112 mi)		
19 May 1547	04:48:58	130	Total	1.0581	05m 22s	23.5°S 110.7°E	270 km (170 mi)		
12 November 1547	12:54:24	135	Annular	0.9106	08m 59s	55.5°N 4.7°W	419 km (260 mi)		
8 April 1548	14:10:08	102	Partial	0.7698	—	71.2°N 156.5°W	—		
7 May 1548	21:46:52	140	Partial	0.2250	—	69.0°S 124.2°W	—		
1 October 1548	20:10:50	107	Partial	0.4394	—	71.7°S 122.3°E	—		
29 March 1549	03:30:55	112	Hybrid	1.0029	00m 16s	31.4°N 120.1°E	11 km (6.8 mi)		
21 September 1549	05:16:24	117	Total	1.0205	01m 49s	33.2°S 88.0°E	82 km (51 mi)		
18 March 1550	09:47:48	122	Annular	0.9497	06m 05s	15.1°S 40.8°E	194 km (121 mi)		
10 September 1550	20:17:38	127	Total	1.0636	05m 38s	12.4°N 121.8°W	212 km (132 mi)		
7 March 1551	10:05:18	132	Partial	0.8730	—	72.2°S 126.5°E	—		
31 August 1551	12:53:01	137	Total	1.0460	02m 52s	65.7°N 28.4°E	391 km (243 mi)		
25 January 1552	20:19:44	104	Partial	0.6655	—	70.0°N 156.6°W	—		
21 July 1552	15:03:48	109	Annular	0.9742	02m 05s	62.9°S 64.6°W	—		
14 January 1553	07:28:09	114	Total	1.0263	02m 41s	6.3°N 68.3°E	99 km (62 mi)		
10 July 1553	18:36:34	119	Annular	0.9509	06m 46s	6.8°N 98.5°W	185 km (115 mi)		
3 January 1554	22:49:38	124	Total	1.0474	04m 00s	35.8°S 158.1°W	163 km (101 mi)		
29 July 1554	19:10:40	129	Annular	0.9546	04m 22s	54.0°N 104.8°W	195 km (121 mi)		
24 December 1554	13:45:21	134	Total	1.0075	00m 25s	87.5°S 159.2°E	75 km (47 mi)		
20 May 1555	14:06:06	101	Partial	0.2696	—	64.0°S 3.3°E	—		
19 July 1555	00:07:16	139	Partial	0.5290	—	66.5°N 6.6°E	—		
14 November 1555	07:19:27	106	Partial	0.5423	—	63.3°N 109.4°E	—		
9 May 1556	04:53:36	111	Total	1.0673	05m 58s	16.0°S 117.8°E	274 km (170 mi)		
2 November 1556	07:22:13	116	Annular	0.9190	10m 24s	15.5°N 78.9°E	370 km (230 mi)		
28 April 1557	21:59:05	121	Total	1.0692	05m 42s	24.0°N 153.1°W	227 km (141 mi)		
22 October 1557	07:49:28	126	Annular	0.9482	05m 40s	21.1°S 56.0°E	192 km (119 mi)		
18 April 1558	12:39:27	131	Total	1.0132	00m 50s	64.1°N 67.8°W	100 km (62 mi)		
11 October 1558	14:58:55	136	Annular	0.9971	00m 12s	56.5°S 90.3°W	18 km (11 mi)		
9 March 1559	05:23:01	103	Partial	0.6598	—	60.8°S 166.6°W	—		
1 September 1559	20:13:59	108	Partial	0.8172	—	61.1°N 25.3°W	—		
1 October 1559	04:46:46	146	Partial	0.1083	—	61.3°S 3.4°E	—		
26 February 1560	05:00:44	113	Annular	0.9299	07m 22s	29.9°S 123.5°E	294 km (183 mi)		
21 August 1560	12:30:55	118	Total	1.0469	03m 45s	29.7°N 5.3°E	170 km (110 mi)		
14 February 1561	07:39:21	123	Annular	0.9670	03m 30s	3.4°N 62.6°E	122 km (76 mi)		
11 August 1561	00:27:07	128	Annular	0.9956	00m 27s	6.5°S 165.5°E	16 km (9.9 mi)		
3 February 1562	17:27:33	133	Total	1.0091	00m 41s	48.6°N 114.5°W	89 km (55 mi)		
31 July 1562	05:16:46	138	Partial	0.7034	—	62.2°S 45.1°E	—		
25 December 1562	21:58:40	105	Partial	0.8217	—	64.6°S 4.6°E	—		
20 July 1563	15:30:55	110	Annular	0.9564	02m 49s	81.3°N 55.3°E	454 km (282 mi)		
15 December 1563	11:55:49	115	Hybrid	1.0020	00m 10s	50.3°S 6.8°E	8 km (5.0 mi)		
8 July 1564	22:26:49	120	Hybrid	1.0174	01m 44s	30.8°N 155.4°W	60 km (37 mi)		
3 December 1564	19:52:06	125	Annular	0.9487	06m 42s	8.8°S 119.2°W	195 km (121 mi)		
29 May 1565	12:15:00	130	Total	1.0629	05m 57s	16.5°S 3.7°W	266 km (165 mi)		
22 November 1565	20:49:55	135	Annular	0.9092	09m 37s	51.4°N 130.5°W	220 km (140 mi)		
19 April 1566	21:56:01	102	Partial	0.6610	—	70.5°N 73.9°E	—		
19 May 1566	05:21:00	140	Partial	0.3507	—	68.1°S 110.7°E	—		
13 October 1566	03:59:23	107	Partial	0.3939	—	71.1°S 8.6°W	—		
9 April 1567	11:04:08	112	Hybrid	1.0020	00m 11s	38.9°N 4.9°E	8 km (5.0 mi)		
2 October 1567	13:20:27	117	Total	1.0200	01m 42s	39.7°S 34.9°W	82 km (51 mi)		
28 March 1568	17:04:21	122	Annular	0.9507	06m 10s	8.1°S 70.5°W	187 km (116 mi)		
21 September 1568	04:25:02	127	Total	1.0615	05m 32s	5.8°N 114.6°E	204 km (127 mi)		
17 March 1569	17:21:18	132	Annular	0.9489	—	72.1°S 3.1°E	—		
10 September 1569	20:48:16	137	Total	1.0428	02m 55s	57.4°N 103.4°W	293 km (182 mi)		
5 February 1570	04:34:49	104	Partial	0.6475	—	70.9°N 66.6°E	—		
1 August 1570	22:00:22	109	Partial	0.8623	—	70.4°S 171.9°E	—		
25 January 1571	16:07:36	114	Total	1.0302	02m 59s	9.5°N 62.8°W	113 km (70 mi)		
22 July 1571	01:07:18	119	Annular	0.9481	07m 08s	0.5°S 162.1°E	201 km (125 mi)		
15 January 1572	07:38:12	124	Total	1.0485	04m 07s	33.0°S 71.6°E	166 km (103 mi)		
10 July 1572	01:42:42	129	Annular	0.9562	04m 30s	46.6°N 159.7°E	177 km (110 mi)		
3 January 1573	22:28:35	134	Hybrid	1.0058	00m 20s	85.9°S 54.1°W	57 km (35 mi)		
30 May 1573	21:18:24	101	Partial	0.1436	—	64.9°S 114.6°W	—		
29 July 1573	07:03:36	139	Partial	0.6770	—	67.5°N 108.2°W	—		
24 November 1573	15:24:46	106	Partial	0.5191	—	64.3°N 21.4°W	—		
20 May 1574	12:25:42	111	Total	1.0694	06m 09s	19.7°S 3.7°E	305 km (190 mi)		
13 November 1574	15:12:17	116	Annular	0.9171	11m 03s	14.8°N 40.0°W	387 km (240 mi)		
10 May 1575	05:34:45	121	Total	1.0697	05m 56s	23.1°N 94.6°E	227 km (141 mi)		
2 November 1575	15:47:27	126	Annular	0.9483	05m 44s	23.5°S 62.6°W	191 km (119 mi)		
28 April 1576	20:04:44	131	Total	1.0140	00m 55s	64.8°N 168.0°W	86 km (53 mi)		
21 October 1576	23:13:06	136	Annular	0.9981	00m 08s	59.2°S 147.9°E	11 km (6.8 mi)		
19 March 1577	12:41:15	103	Partial	0.5798	—	60.9°S 75.2°E	—		
12 September 1577	04:15:23	108	Partial	0.7297	—	61.0°N 154.4°W	—		
11 October 1577	13:08:02	146	Partial	0.1654	—	61.6°S 130.8°W	—		
8 March 1578	12:26:52	113	Annular	0.9336	07m 01s	27.7°S 12.3°E	284 km (176 mi)		
1 September 1578	20:15:08	118	Total	1.0408	03m 17s	28.4°N 109.6°W	152 km (94 mi)		
25 February 1579	15:34:47	123	Annular	0.9728	02m 48s	6.0°N 56.4°W	100 km (62 mi)		
22 August 1579	07:41:32	128	Annular	0.9901	01m 00s	6.6°S 57.2°E	36 km (22 mi)		
15 February 1580	01:52:13	133	Total	1.0151	01m 07s	47.9°N 117.3°E	127 km (79 mi)		
10 August 1580	12:00:05	138	Partial	0.8258	—	61.6°S 64.7°W	—		
5 January 1581	06:49:58	105	Partial	0.8121	—	63.7°S 137.9°W	—		
30 July 1581	22:06:53	110	Partial	0.9454	—	64.2°N 2.2°W	—		
25 December 1581	20:35:20	115	Annular	0.9993	00m 04s	49.4°S 118.5°W	3 km (1.9 mi)		
20 July 1582	05:30:27	120	Total	1.0210	01m 59s	35.0°N 100.8°E	73 km (45 mi)		
25 December 1582	04:08:39	125	Annular	0.9459	07m 02s	9.4°S 116.8°E	206 km (128 mi)		
19 July 1583	19:39:32	130	Total	1.0667	06m 23s	10.4°S 116.9°W	262 km (163 mi)		
14 December 1583	04:48:39	135	Annular	0.9083	10m 03s	48.5°N 104.1°E	116 km (72 mi)		
10 May 1584	05:35:06	102	Partial	0.5424	—	69.7°N 53.5°W	—		
8 July 1584	12:52:25	140	Partial	0.4805	—	67.1°S 13.3°W	—		
2 November 1584	11:56:44	107	Partial	0.3595	—	70.4°S 141.1°W	—		
29 April 1585	18:28:58	112	Hybrid	1.0005	00m 03s	46.6°N 107.7°W	2 km (1.2 mi)		
22 October 1585	21:33:25	117	Total	1.0196	01m 35s	45.7°S 159.2°W	82 km (51 mi)		
19 April 1586	00:10:09	122	Annular	0.9517	06m 12s	0.9°S 179.1°W	181 km (112 mi)		
12 October 1586	12:40:32	127	Total	1.0591	05m 23s	0.3°S 10.8°W	196 km (122 mi)		
8 April 1587	00:27:05	132	Annular	0.9271	06m 26s	60.5°S 151.9°W	889 km (552 mi)		
2 October 1587	04:51:25	137	Total	1.0387	02m 51s	50.0°N 128.3°E	235 km (146 mi)		
26 February 1588	12:42:31	104	Partial	0.6178	—	71.5°N 68.8°W	—		
22 August 1588	05:01:47	109	Partial	0.7355	—	71.1°S 53.5°E	—		
15 February 1589	00:42:20	114	Total	1.0344	03m 17s	13.6°N 167.1°E	129 km (80 mi)		
11 August 1589	07:41:04	119	Annular	0.9450	07m 25s	8.2°S 61.4°E	221 km (137 mi)		
4 February 1590	16:24:05	124	Total	1.0498	04m 17s	29.3°S 58.8°W	170 km (110 mi)		
31 July 1590	08:17:39	129	Annular	0.9574	04m 38s	38.8°N 61.6°E	166 km (103 mi)		
25 January 1591	07:09:22	134	Hybrid	1.0047	00m 16s	81.9°S 150.6°E	45 km (28 mi)		
21 July 1591	04:28:43	101	Partial	0.0129	—	65.8°S 127.7°E	—		
20 July 1591	14:02:08	139	Partial	0.8249	—	68.5°N 136.0°E	—		
15 December 1591	23:33:56	106	Partial	0.5024	—	65.3°N 153.5°W	—		
9 July 1592	19:55:49	111	Total	1.0705	06m 11s	24.7°S 110.3°W	344 km (214 mi)		
3 December 1592	23:07:16	116	Annular	0.9159	11m 36s	14.5°N 160.2°W	401 km (249 mi)		
30 May 1593	13:07:31	121	Total	1.0696	06m 08s	21.4°N 17.0°W	227 km (141 mi)		
22 November 1593	23:52:06	126	Annular	0.9488	05m 47s	25.4°S 177.5°E	189 km (117 mi)		
20 May 1594	03:23:17	131	Total	1.0141	00m 58s	64.9°N 94.1°E	76 km (47 mi)		
12 November 1594	07:34:49	136	Annular	0.9991	00m 04s	62.4°S 25.1°E	5 km (3.1 mi)		
9 April 1595	19:50:05	103	Partial	0.4879	—	61.1°S 40.7°W	—		
3 October 1595	12:24:36	108	Partial	0.6546	—	61.1°N 74.6°E	—		
1 November 1595	21:36:53	146	Partial	0.2111	—	62.1°S 93.1°E	—		
28 March 1596	19:43:19	113	Annular	0.9373	06m 42s	26.3°S 96.5°W	275 km (171 mi)		
22 September 1596	04:07:03	118	Total	1.0346	02m 50s	26.8°N 133.0°E	134 km (83 mi)		
17 March 1597	23:22:39	123	Annular	0.9788	02m 08s	8.4°N 173.3°W	77 km (48 mi)		
11 September 1597	15:01:22	128	Annular	0.9843	01m 35s	7.6°S 52.4°W	57 km (35 mi)		
7 March 1598	10:10:01	133	Total	1.0214	01m 33s	47.7°N 8.2°W	156 km (97 mi)		
31 August 1598	18:48:48	138	Annular	0.9398	—	61.2°S 175.6°W	—		
26 January 1599	15:37:11	105	Partial	0.7965	—	62.9°S 80.9°E	—		
22 July 1599	04:45:15	110	Partial	0.8068	—	63.4°N 111.2°W	—		
16 January 1600	05:12:46	115	Annular	0.9972	00m 14s	47.4°S 115.9°E	11 km (6.8 mi)		
10 July 1600	12:35:58	120	Total	1.0238	02m 08s	38.2°N 2.7°W	84 km (52 mi)		
