= Solar eclipse of October 4, 2089 =

Total eclipse

- Total eclipse
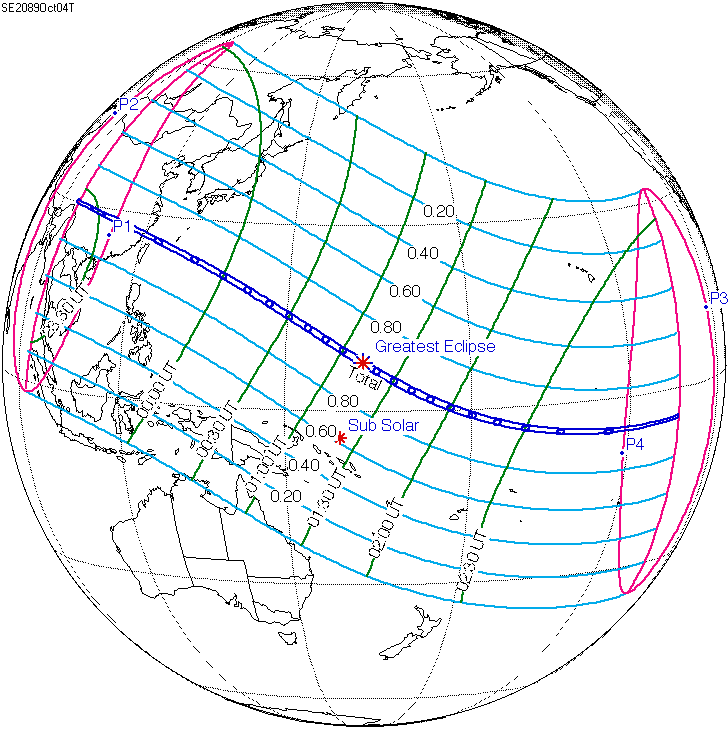
- Map
- Gamma: 0.2167
- Magnitude: 1.0333

Maximum eclipse
- Duration: 194 s (3 min 14 s)
- Coordinates: 7.4°N 162.8°E
- Max. width of band: 115 km (71 mi)

Times (UTC)
- Greatest eclipse: 1:15:23

References
- Saros: 145 (26 of 77)
- Catalog # (SE5000): 9709

A total solar eclipse will occur at the Moon's ascending node of orbit between Monday, October 3 and Tuesday, October 4, 2089, with a magnitude of 1.0333. A solar eclipse occurs when the Moon passes between Earth and the Sun, thereby totally or partly obscuring the image of the Sun for a viewer on Earth. A total solar eclipse occurs when the Moon's apparent diameter is larger than the Sun's, blocking all direct sunlight, turning day into darkness. Totality occurs in a narrow path across Earth's surface, with the partial solar eclipse visible over a surrounding region thousands of kilometres wide. Occurring about 2.3 days after perigee (on October 1, 2089, at 17:30 UTC), the Moon's apparent diameter will be larger.

The path of totality will be visible from parts of China, the Ryukyu Islands, the Northern Mariana Islands, and Kiribati. A partial solar eclipse will also be visible for parts of East Asia, Southeast Asia, Oceania, and Hawaii.

== Eclipse details ==
Shown below are two tables displaying details about this particular solar eclipse. The first table outlines times at which the Moon's penumbra or umbra attains the specific parameter, and the second table describes various other parameters pertaining to this eclipse.

October 4, 2089 Solar Eclipse Times
Event	Time (UTC)
First Penumbral External Contact	2089 October 3 at 22:33:30.2 UTC
First Umbral External Contact	2089 October 3 at 23:31:24.1 UTC
First Central Line	2089 October 3 at 23:31:53.4 UTC
First Umbral Internal Contact	2089 October 3 at 23:32:22.6 UTC
First Penumbral Internal Contact	2089 October 4 at 00:32:45.2 UTC
Equatorial Conjunction	2089 October 4 at 01:08:13.0 UTC
Greatest Duration	2089 October 4 at 01:14:55.9 UTC
Greatest Eclipse	2089 October 4 at 01:15:23.2 UTC
Ecliptic Conjunction	2089 October 4 at 01:17:40.4 UTC
Last Penumbral Internal Contact	2089 October 4 at 01:58:11.7 UTC
Last Umbral Internal Contact	2089 October 4 at 02:58:32.0 UTC
Last Central Line	2089 October 4 at 02:58:58.9 UTC
Last Umbral External Contact	2089 October 4 at 02:59:25.8 UTC
Last Penumbral External Contact	2089 October 4 at 03:57:24.6 UTC

October 4, 2089 Solar Eclipse Parameters
Parameter	Value
Eclipse Magnitude	1.03333
Eclipse Obscuration	1.06777
Gamma	0.21671
Sun Right Ascension	12h42m34.2s
Sun Declination	-04°34'29.0"
Sun Semi-Diameter	15'59.1"
Sun Equatorial Horizontal Parallax	08.8"
Moon Right Ascension	12h42m49.6s
Moon Declination	-04°22'10.5"
Moon Semi-Diameter	16'15.0"
Moon Equatorial Horizontal Parallax	0°59'38.5"
ΔT	113.9 s

== Eclipse season ==
This eclipse is part of an eclipse season, a period, roughly every six months, when eclipses occur. Only two (or occasionally three) eclipse seasons occur each year, and each season lasts about 35 days and repeats just short of six months (173 days) later; thus two full eclipse seasons always occur each year. Either two or three eclipses happen each eclipse season. In the sequence below, each eclipse is separated by a fortnight.

Eclipse season of September–October 2089
September 19 Descending node (full moon)	October 4 Ascending node (new moon)
Penumbral lunar eclipse Lunar Saros 119	Total solar eclipse Solar Saros 145

== Related eclipses ==
=== Eclipses in 2089 ===
- A penumbral lunar eclipse on March 26.
- An annular solar eclipse on April 10.
- A penumbral lunar eclipse on September 19.
- A total solar eclipse on October 4.

=== Metonic ===
- Preceded by: Solar eclipse of December 16, 2085
- Followed by: Solar eclipse of July 23, 2093

=== Tzolkinex ===
- Preceded by: Solar eclipse of August 24, 2082
- Followed by: Solar eclipse of November 15, 2096

=== Half-Saros ===
- Preceded by: Lunar eclipse of September 29, 2080
- Followed by: Lunar eclipse of October 10, 2098

=== Tritos ===
- Preceded by: Solar eclipse of November 4, 2078
- Followed by: Solar eclipse of September 4, 2100

=== Solar Saros 145 ===
- Preceded by: Solar eclipse of September 23, 2071
- Followed by: Solar eclipse of October 16, 2107

=== Inex ===
- Preceded by: Solar eclipse of October 24, 2060
- Followed by: Solar eclipse of September 15, 2118

=== Triad ===
- Preceded by: Solar eclipse of December 4, 2002
- Followed by: Solar eclipse of August 4, 2176

=== Solar eclipses of 2087–2090 ===
This eclipse is a member of a semester series. An eclipse in a semester series of solar eclipses repeats approximately every 177 days and 4 hours (a semester) at alternating nodes of the Moon's orbit.

The partial solar eclipse on June 1, 2087 occurs in the previous lunar year eclipse set.

Solar eclipse series sets from 2087 to 2090
Descending node			Ascending node		
Saros	Map	Gamma	Saros	Map	Gamma
120	May 2, 2087 Partial	1.1139	125	October 26, 2087 Partial	−1.2882
130	April 21, 2088 Total	0.4135	135	October 14, 2088 Annular	−0.5349
140	April 10, 2089 Annular	−0.3319	145	October 4, 2089 Total	0.2167
150	March 31, 2090 Partial	−1.1028	155	September 23, 2090 Total	0.9157

=== Saros 145 ===
This eclipse is a part of Saros series 145, repeating every 18 years, 11 days, and containing 77 events. The series started with a partial solar eclipse on January 4, 1639. It contains an annular eclipse on June 6, 1891; a hybrid eclipse on June 17, 1909; and total eclipses from June 29, 1927 through September 9, 2648. The series ends at member 77 as a partial eclipse on April 17, 3009. Its eclipses are tabulated in three columns; every third eclipse in the same column is one exeligmos apart, so they all cast shadows over approximately the same parts of the Earth.

The longest duration of annularity was produced by member 15 at 6 seconds (by default) on June 6, 1891, and the longest duration of totality will be produced by member 50 at 7 minutes, 12 seconds on June 25, 2522. All eclipses in this series occur at the Moon’s ascending node of orbit.

Series members 10–32 occur between 1801 and 2200:
10	11	12
April 13, 1801	April 24, 1819	May 4, 1837
13	14	15
May 16, 1855	May 26, 1873	June 6, 1891
16	17	18
June 17, 1909	June 29, 1927	July 9, 1945
19	20	21
July 20, 1963	July 31, 1981	August 11, 1999
22	23	24
August 21, 2017	September 2, 2035	September 12, 2053
25	26	27
September 23, 2071	October 4, 2089	October 16, 2107
28	29	30
October 26, 2125	November 7, 2143	November 17, 2161
31	32	
November 28, 2179	December 9, 2197	

=== Metonic series ===
The metonic series repeats eclipses every 19 years (6939.69 days), lasting about 5 cycles. Eclipses occur in nearly the same calendar date. In addition, the octon subseries repeats 1/5 of that or every 3.8 years (1387.94 days). All eclipses in this table occur at the Moon's ascending node.

21 eclipse events between July 23, 2036 and July 23, 2112
July 23–24	May 11	February 27–28	December 16–17	October 4–5
117	119	121	123	125
July 23, 2036	May 11, 2040	February 28, 2044	December 16, 2047	October 4, 2051
127	129	131	133	135
July 24, 2055	May 11, 2059	February 28, 2063	December 17, 2066	October 4, 2070
137	139	141	143	145
July 24, 2074	May 11, 2078	February 27, 2082	December 16, 2085	October 4, 2089
147	149	151	153	155
July 23, 2093	May 11, 2097	February 28, 2101	December 17, 2104	October 5, 2108
157
July 23, 2112

=== Tritos series ===
This eclipse is a part of a tritos cycle, repeating at alternating nodes every 135 synodic months (≈ 3986.63 days, or 11 years minus 1 month). Their appearance and longitude are irregular due to a lack of synchronization with the anomalistic month (period of perigee), but groupings of 3 tritos cycles (≈ 33 years minus 3 months) come close (≈ 434.044 anomalistic months), so eclipses are similar in these groupings.

Series members between 1801 and 2200
December 21, 1805 (Saros 119)	November 19, 1816 (Saros 120)	October 20, 1827 (Saros 121)	September 18, 1838 (Saros 122)	August 18, 1849 (Saros 123)
July 18, 1860 (Saros 124)	June 18, 1871 (Saros 125)	May 17, 1882 (Saros 126)	April 16, 1893 (Saros 127)	March 17, 1904 (Saros 128)
February 14, 1915 (Saros 129)	January 14, 1926 (Saros 130)	December 13, 1936 (Saros 131)	November 12, 1947 (Saros 132)	October 12, 1958 (Saros 133)
September 11, 1969 (Saros 134)	August 10, 1980 (Saros 135)	July 11, 1991 (Saros 136)	June 10, 2002 (Saros 137)	May 10, 2013 (Saros 138)
April 8, 2024 (Saros 139)	March 9, 2035 (Saros 140)	February 5, 2046 (Saros 141)	January 5, 2057 (Saros 142)	December 6, 2067 (Saros 143)
November 4, 2078 (Saros 144)	October 4, 2089 (Saros 145)	September 4, 2100 (Saros 146)	August 4, 2111 (Saros 147)	July 4, 2122 (Saros 148)
June 3, 2133 (Saros 149)	May 3, 2144 (Saros 150)	April 2, 2155 (Saros 151)	March 2, 2166 (Saros 152)	January 29, 2177 (Saros 153)
December 29, 2187 (Saros 154)	November 28, 2198 (Saros 155)			

=== Inex series ===
This eclipse is a part of the long period inex cycle, repeating at alternating nodes, every 358 synodic months (≈ 10,571.95 days, or 29 years minus 20 days). Their appearance and longitude are irregular due to a lack of synchronization with the anomalistic month (period of perigee). However, groupings of 3 inex cycles (≈ 87 years minus 2 months) comes close (≈ 1,151.02 anomalistic months), so eclipses are similar in these groupings.

Series members between 1801 and 2200
April 3, 1829 (Saros 136)	March 15, 1858 (Saros 137)	February 22, 1887 (Saros 138)
February 3, 1916 (Saros 139)	January 14, 1945 (Saros 140)	December 24, 1973 (Saros 141)
December 4, 2002 (Saros 142)	November 14, 2031 (Saros 143)	October 24, 2060 (Saros 144)
October 4, 2089 (Saros 145)	September 15, 2118 (Saros 146)	August 26, 2147 (Saros 147)
August 4, 2176 (Saros 148)		
