= Solar eclipses after the modern era =

This article contains information and statistics about solar eclipses occurring after the modern era, from the 22nd century to the 30th century.

== Solar eclipses by century ==
Century	No.	Eclipse type				Longest eclipse (Note: All eclipses listed are annular. See § Longest total eclipses for the longest total eclipses)		Two-eclipse months (Note: Months listed in this column had two eclipses occur during that time period)	Ref.
Century	No.	Partial (P)	Annular (A)	Total (T)	Hybrid (H)	Length	Date	Two-eclipse months	Ref.
22nd	235	79	87	65	4	10m55s	10 January 2168		
23rd	248	92	86	67	3	10m38s	2 February 2204	December 2206, January 2261, November 2282	
24th	248	88	86	66	8	09m40s	3 December 2309	September 2304, August 2380	
25th	237	81	89	66	1	10m22s	28 December 2494		
26th	225	83	72	64	6	10m25s	8 January 2513		
27th	227	77	81	64	5	09m17s	2 January 2690		
28th	242	84	92	63	3	10m04s	16 February 2762	May 2785	
29th	254	95	87	63	9	10m20s	7 January 2885		
30th	248	91	82	64	11	10m12s	19 January 2903		

== Longest total eclipses ==
Below is a list of all total eclipses at least 7 minutes long that will occur between the 22nd and 30th centuries. Of the listed eclipses, the first five are in Solar Saros 139, the next three are in Solar Saros 145, and the final four are in Solar Saros 170.

Date of eclipse	Central Duration	Reference	Saros
25 June 2150	07m14s		139
5 July 2168	07m26s		139
16 July 2186	07m29s (Note: This is the longest total eclipse in the five-millennium period between the 20th century BC and 30th century.)		139
27 July 2204	07m22s		139
8 August 2222	07m06s		139
14 June 2504	07m10s		145
25 June 2522	07m12s		145
5 July 2540	07m04s		145
12 June 2849	07m00s		170
23 June 2867	07m10s		170
3 July 2885	07m11s		170
16 July 2903	07m04s		170
