= Solar eclipse of February 27, 2082 =

Future annular solar eclipse

- Annular eclipse
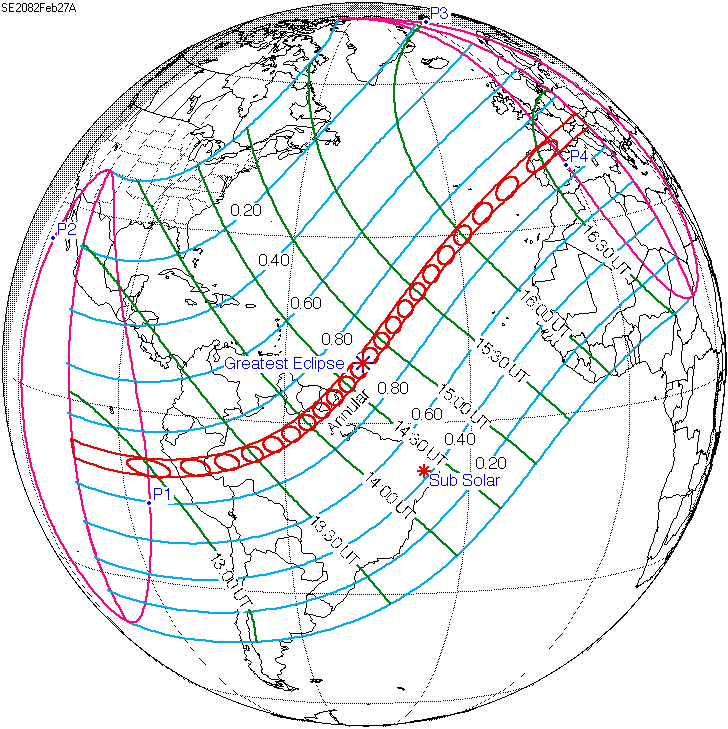
- Map
- Gamma: 0.3361
- Magnitude: 0.9298

Maximum eclipse
- Duration: 492 s (8 min 12 s)
- Coordinates: 9.4°N 47.1°W
- Max. width of band: 277 km (172 mi)

Times (UTC)
- Greatest eclipse: 14:47:00

References
- Saros: 141 (27 of 70)
- Catalog # (SE5000): 9691

An annular solar eclipse will occur at the Moon's ascending node of orbit on Friday, February 27, 2082, with a magnitude of 0.9298. A solar eclipse occurs when the Moon passes between Earth and the Sun, thereby totally or partly obscuring the image of the Sun for a viewer on Earth. An annular solar eclipse occurs when the Moon's apparent diameter is smaller than the Sun's, blocking most of the Sun's light and causing the Sun to look like an annulus (ring). An annular eclipse appears as a partial eclipse over a region of the Earth thousands of kilometres wide. Occurring about 2.7 days before apogee (on March 2, 2082, at 8:00 UTC), the Moon's apparent diameter will be smaller.

The path of annularity will be visible from parts of Peru, Brazil, southeastern Suriname, French Guiana, Portugal, Spain, France, Switzerland, Italy, southern Germany, Liechtenstein, Austria, Slovenia, northern Croatia, and western Hungary. A partial solar eclipse will also be visible for parts of South America, Central America, the Caribbean, Mexico, the southeastern United States, eastern Canada, West Africa, North Africa, Greenland, and Europe.

== Eclipse details ==
Shown below are two tables displaying details about this particular solar eclipse. The first table outlines times at which the Moon's penumbra or umbra attains the specific parameter, and the second table describes various other parameters pertaining to this eclipse.

February 27, 2082 Solar Eclipse Times
Event	Time (UTC)
First Penumbral External Contact	2082 February 27 at 11:45:40.8 UTC
First Umbral External Contact	2082 February 27 at 12:52:36.1 UTC
First Central Line	2082 February 27 at 12:55:43.3 UTC
First Umbral Internal Contact	2082 February 27 at 12:58:51.2 UTC
First Penumbral Internal Contact	2082 February 27 at 14:15:39.6 UTC
Greatest Duration	2082 February 27 at 14:34:08.6 UTC
Greatest Eclipse	2082 February 27 at 14:46:59.8 UTC
Ecliptic Conjunction	2082 February 27 at 14:51:00.7 UTC
Equatorial Conjunction	2082 February 27 at 15:07:59.3 UTC
Last Penumbral Internal Contact	2082 February 27 at 15:17:48.9 UTC
Last Umbral Internal Contact	2082 February 27 at 16:34:54.0 UTC
Last Central Line	2082 February 27 at 16:38:03.7 UTC
Last Umbral External Contact	2082 February 27 at 16:41:12.7 UTC
Last Penumbral External Contact	2082 February 27 at 17:48:13.9 UTC

February 27, 2082 Solar Eclipse Parameters
Parameter	Value
Eclipse Magnitude	0.92978
Eclipse Obscuration	0.86449
Gamma	0.33612
Sun Right Ascension	22h44m00.6s
Sun Declination	-08°01'49.1"
Sun Semi-Diameter	16'09.0"
Sun Equatorial Horizontal Parallax	08.9"
Moon Right Ascension	22h43m26.2s
Moon Declination	-07°45'43.0"
Moon Semi-Diameter	14'48.3"
Moon Equatorial Horizontal Parallax	0°54'19.9"
ΔT	107.2 s

== Eclipse season ==
This eclipse is part of an eclipse season, a period, roughly every six months, when eclipses occur. Only two (or occasionally three) eclipse seasons occur each year, and each season lasts about 35 days and repeats just short of six months (173 days) later; thus two full eclipse seasons always occur each year. Either two or three eclipses happen each eclipse season. In the sequence below, each eclipse is separated by a fortnight.

Eclipse season of February 2082
February 13 Descending node (full moon)	February 27 Ascending node (new moon)
Partial lunar eclipse Lunar Saros 115	Annular solar eclipse Solar Saros 141

== Related eclipses ==
=== Eclipses in 2082 ===
- A partial lunar eclipse on February 13.
- An annular solar eclipse on February 27.
- A penumbral lunar eclipse on August 8.
- A total solar eclipse on August 24.

=== Metonic ===
- Preceded by: Solar eclipse of May 11, 2078
- Followed by: Solar eclipse of December 16, 2085

=== Tzolkinex ===
- Preceded by: Solar eclipse of January 16, 2075
- Followed by: Solar eclipse of April 10, 2089

=== Half-Saros ===
- Preceded by: Lunar eclipse of February 22, 2073
- Followed by: Lunar eclipse of March 5, 2091

=== Tritos ===
- Preceded by: Solar eclipse of March 31, 2071
- Followed by: Solar eclipse of January 27, 2093

=== Solar Saros 141 ===
- Preceded by: Solar eclipse of February 17, 2064
- Followed by: Solar eclipse of March 10, 2100

=== Inex ===
- Preceded by: Solar eclipse of March 20, 2053
- Followed by: Solar eclipse of February 8, 2111

=== Triad ===
- Preceded by: Solar eclipse of April 29, 1995
- Followed by: Solar eclipse of December 29, 2168

=== Solar eclipses of 2080–2083 ===
This eclipse is a member of a semester series. An eclipse in a semester series of solar eclipses repeats approximately every 177 days and 4 hours (a semester) at alternating nodes of the Moon's orbit.

The partial solar eclipse on July 15, 2083 occurs in the next lunar year eclipse set.

Solar eclipse series sets from 2080 to 2083
Ascending node			Descending node		
Saros	Map	Gamma	Saros	Map	Gamma
121	March 21, 2080 Partial	−1.0578	126	September 13, 2080 Partial	1.0723
131	March 10, 2081 Annular	−0.3653	136	September 3, 2081 Total	0.3378
141	February 27, 2082 Annular	0.3361	146	August 24, 2082 Total	−0.4004
151	February 16, 2083 Partial	1.017	156	August 13, 2083 Partial	−1.2064

=== Saros 141 ===
This eclipse is a part of Saros series 141, repeating every 18 years, 11 days, and containing 70 events. The series started with a partial solar eclipse on May 19, 1613. It contains annular eclipses from August 4, 1739 through October 14, 2640. There are no hybrid or total eclipses in this set. The series ends at member 70 as a partial eclipse on June 13, 2857. Its eclipses are tabulated in three columns; every third eclipse in the same column is one exeligmos apart, so they all cast shadows over approximately the same parts of the Earth.

The longest duration of annularity was produced by member 20 at 12 minutes, 9 seconds on December 14, 1955. All eclipses in this series occur at the Moon’s ascending node of orbit.

Series members 12–33 occur between 1801 and 2200:
12	13	14
September 17, 1811	September 28, 1829	October 9, 1847
15	16	17
October 19, 1865	October 30, 1883	November 11, 1901
18	19	20
November 22, 1919	December 2, 1937	December 14, 1955
21	22	23
December 24, 1973	January 4, 1992	January 15, 2010
24	25	26
January 26, 2028	February 5, 2046	February 17, 2064
27	28	29
February 27, 2082	March 10, 2100	March 22, 2118
30	31	32
April 1, 2136	April 12, 2154	April 23, 2172
33
May 4, 2190

=== Metonic series ===
The metonic series repeats eclipses every 19 years (6939.69 days), lasting about 5 cycles. Eclipses occur in nearly the same calendar date. In addition, the octon subseries repeats 1/5 of that or every 3.8 years (1387.94 days). All eclipses in this table occur at the Moon's ascending node.

21 eclipse events between July 23, 2036 and July 23, 2112
July 23–24	May 11	February 27–28	December 16–17	October 4–5
117	119	121	123	125
July 23, 2036	May 11, 2040	February 28, 2044	December 16, 2047	October 4, 2051
127	129	131	133	135
July 24, 2055	May 11, 2059	February 28, 2063	December 17, 2066	October 4, 2070
137	139	141	143	145
July 24, 2074	May 11, 2078	February 27, 2082	December 16, 2085	October 4, 2089
147	149	151	153	155
July 23, 2093	May 11, 2097	February 28, 2101	December 17, 2104	October 5, 2108
157
July 23, 2112

=== Tritos series ===
This eclipse is a part of a tritos cycle, repeating at alternating nodes every 135 synodic months (≈ 3986.63 days, or 11 years minus 1 month). Their appearance and longitude are irregular due to a lack of synchronization with the anomalistic month (period of perigee), but groupings of 3 tritos cycles (≈ 33 years minus 3 months) come close (≈ 434.044 anomalistic months), so eclipses are similar in these groupings.

Series members between 1801 and 2200
April 14, 1809 (Saros 116)	March 14, 1820 (Saros 117)	February 12, 1831 (Saros 118)	January 11, 1842 (Saros 119)	December 11, 1852 (Saros 120)
November 11, 1863 (Saros 121)	October 10, 1874 (Saros 122)	September 8, 1885 (Saros 123)	August 9, 1896 (Saros 124)	July 10, 1907 (Saros 125)
June 8, 1918 (Saros 126)	May 9, 1929 (Saros 127)	April 7, 1940 (Saros 128)	March 7, 1951 (Saros 129)	February 5, 1962 (Saros 130)
January 4, 1973 (Saros 131)	December 4, 1983 (Saros 132)	November 3, 1994 (Saros 133)	October 3, 2005 (Saros 134)	September 1, 2016 (Saros 135)
August 2, 2027 (Saros 136)	July 2, 2038 (Saros 137)	May 31, 2049 (Saros 138)	April 30, 2060 (Saros 139)	March 31, 2071 (Saros 140)
February 27, 2082 (Saros 141)	January 27, 2093 (Saros 142)	December 29, 2103 (Saros 143)	November 27, 2114 (Saros 144)	October 26, 2125 (Saros 145)
September 26, 2136 (Saros 146)	August 26, 2147 (Saros 147)	July 25, 2158 (Saros 148)	June 25, 2169 (Saros 149)	May 24, 2180 (Saros 150)
April 23, 2191 (Saros 151)

=== Inex series ===
This eclipse is a part of the long period inex cycle, repeating at alternating nodes, every 358 synodic months (≈ 10,571.95 days, or 29 years minus 20 days). Their appearance and longitude are irregular due to a lack of synchronization with the anomalistic month (period of perigee). However, groupings of 3 inex cycles (≈ 87 years minus 2 months) comes close (≈ 1,151.02 anomalistic months), so eclipses are similar in these groupings.

Series members between 1801 and 2200
August 27, 1821 (Saros 132)	August 7, 1850 (Saros 133)	July 19, 1879 (Saros 134)
June 28, 1908 (Saros 135)	June 8, 1937 (Saros 136)	May 20, 1966 (Saros 137)
April 29, 1995 (Saros 138)	April 8, 2024 (Saros 139)	March 20, 2053 (Saros 140)
February 27, 2082 (Saros 141)	February 8, 2111 (Saros 142)	January 20, 2140 (Saros 143)
December 29, 2168 (Saros 144)	December 9, 2197 (Saros 145)	
