= Solar eclipse of April 21, 2088 =

Total eclipse

- Total eclipse
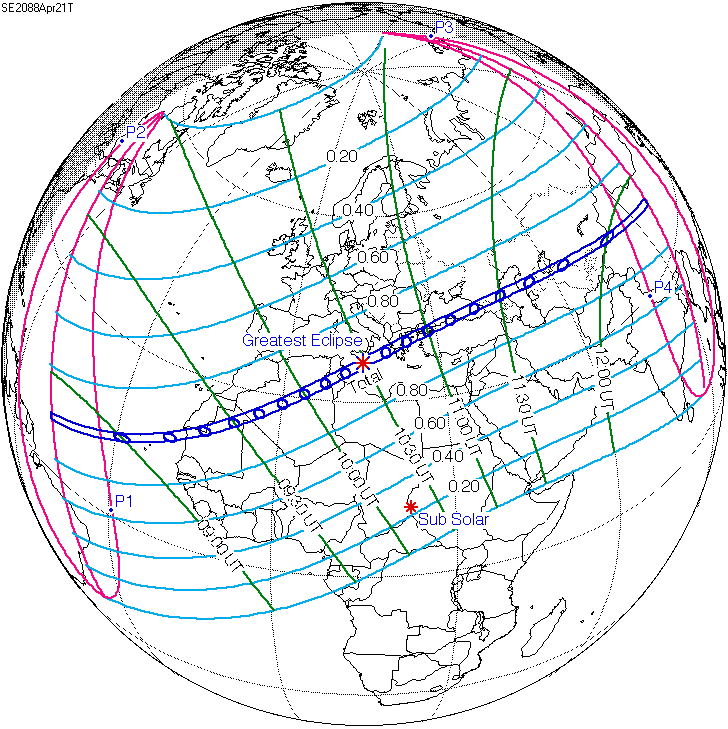
- Map
- Gamma: 0.4135
- Magnitude: 1.0474

Maximum eclipse
- Duration: 238 s (3 min 58 s)
- Coordinates: 36°N 15.1°E
- Max. width of band: 173 km (107 mi)

Times (UTC)
- Greatest eclipse: 10:31:49

References
- Saros: 130 (56 of 73)
- Catalog # (SE5000): 9706

A total solar eclipse will occur at the Moon's descending node of orbit on Wednesday, April 21, 2088, with a magnitude of 1.0474. A solar eclipse occurs when the Moon passes between Earth and the Sun, thereby totally or partly obscuring the image of the Sun for a viewer on Earth. A total solar eclipse occurs when the Moon's apparent diameter is larger than the Sun's, blocking all direct sunlight, turning day into darkness. Totality occurs in a narrow path across Earth's surface, with the partial solar eclipse visible over a surrounding region thousands of kilometres wide. Occurring about 1.8 days before perigee (on April 23, 2088, at 5:10 UTC), the Moon's apparent diameter will be larger.

The path of totality will be visible from parts of Cape Verde, Mauritania, Western Sahara, northern Mali, Algeria, Tunisia, Malta, southern Italy, Greece, Turkey, Georgia, southern Russia, Kazakhstan, Uzbekistan, Kyrgyzstan, and western China. A partial solar eclipse will also be visible for parts of eastern Canada, Greenland, Europe, West Africa, North Africa, the Middle East, Central Asia, South Asia, and Southeast Asia.

Note that the central line of this total solar eclipse follows a path extremely similar to that of the annular eclipse that occurred 112 years earlier on April 29, 1976.

== Eclipse details ==
Shown below are two tables displaying details about this particular solar eclipse. The first table outlines times at which the Moon's penumbra or umbra attains the specific parameter, and the second table describes various other parameters pertaining to this eclipse.

April 21, 2088 Solar Eclipse Times
Event	Time (UTC)
First Penumbral External Contact	2088 April 21 at 07:56:26.3 UTC
First Umbral External Contact	2088 April 21 at 08:55:25.1 UTC
First Central Line	2088 April 21 at 08:56:20.7 UTC
First Umbral Internal Contact	2088 April 21 at 08:57:16.5 UTC
First Penumbral Internal Contact	2088 April 21 at 10:10:39.3 UTC
Ecliptic Conjunction	2088 April 21 at 10:27:31.4 UTC
Greatest Eclipse	2088 April 21 at 10:31:49.5 UTC
Greatest Duration	2088 April 21 at 10:35:01.4 UTC
Equatorial Conjunction	2088 April 21 at 10:42:59.9 UTC
Last Penumbral Internal Contact	2088 April 21 at 10:52:42.8 UTC
Last Umbral Internal Contact	2088 April 21 at 12:06:12.1 UTC
Last Central Line	2088 April 21 at 12:07:09.8 UTC
Last Umbral External Contact	2088 April 21 at 12:08:07.4 UTC
Last Penumbral External Contact	2088 April 21 at 13:07:03.4 UTC

April 21, 2088 Solar Eclipse Parameters
Parameter	Value
Eclipse Magnitude	1.04745
Eclipse Obscuration	1.09715
Gamma	0.41352
Sun Right Ascension	02h00m30.3s
Sun Declination	+12°16'07.2"
Sun Semi-Diameter	15'54.9"
Sun Equatorial Horizontal Parallax	08.8"
Moon Right Ascension	02h00m04.9s
Moon Declination	+12°40'11.3"
Moon Semi-Diameter	16'25.1"
Moon Equatorial Horizontal Parallax	1°00'15.3"
ΔT	112.6 s

== Eclipse season ==
This eclipse is part of an eclipse season, a period, roughly every six months, when eclipses occur. Only two (or occasionally three) eclipse seasons occur each year, and each season lasts about 35 days and repeats just short of six months (173 days) later; thus two full eclipse seasons always occur each year. Either two or three eclipses happen each eclipse season. In the sequence below, each eclipse is separated by a fortnight.

Eclipse season of April–May 2088
April 21 Descending node (new moon)	May 5 Ascending node (full moon)
Total solar eclipse Solar Saros 130	Partial lunar eclipse Lunar Saros 142

== Related eclipses ==
=== Eclipses in 2088 ===
- A total solar eclipse on April 21.
- A partial lunar eclipse on May 5.
- An annular solar eclipse on October 14.
- A partial lunar eclipse on October 30.

=== Metonic ===
- Preceded by: Solar eclipse of July 3, 2084
- Followed by: Solar eclipse of February 7, 2092

=== Tzolkinex ===
- Preceded by: Solar eclipse of March 10, 2081
- Followed by: Solar eclipse of June 2, 2095

=== Half-Saros ===
- Preceded by: Lunar eclipse of April 16, 2079
- Followed by: Lunar eclipse of April 26, 2097

=== Tritos ===
- Preceded by: Solar eclipse of May 22, 2077
- Followed by: Solar eclipse of March 21, 2099

=== Solar Saros 130 ===
- Preceded by: Solar eclipse of April 11, 2070
- Followed by: Solar eclipse of May 3, 2106

=== Inex ===
- Preceded by: Solar eclipse of May 11, 2059
- Followed by: Solar eclipse of April 2, 2117

=== Triad ===
- Preceded by: Solar eclipse of June 21, 2001
- Followed by: Solar eclipse of February 21, 2175

=== Solar eclipses of 2087–2090 ===
This eclipse is a member of a semester series. An eclipse in a semester series of solar eclipses repeats approximately every 177 days and 4 hours (a semester) at alternating nodes of the Moon's orbit.

The partial solar eclipse on June 1, 2087 occurs in the previous lunar year eclipse set.

Solar eclipse series sets from 2087 to 2090
Descending node			Ascending node		
Saros	Map	Gamma	Saros	Map	Gamma
120	May 2, 2087 Partial	1.1139	125	October 26, 2087 Partial	−1.2882
130	April 21, 2088 Total	0.4135	135	October 14, 2088 Annular	−0.5349
140	April 10, 2089 Annular	−0.3319	145	October 4, 2089 Total	0.2167
150	March 31, 2090 Partial	−1.1028	155	September 23, 2090 Total	0.9157

=== Saros 130 ===
This eclipse is a part of Saros series 130, repeating every 18 years, 11 days, and containing 73 events. The series started with a partial solar eclipse on August 20, 1096. It contains total eclipses from April 5, 1475 through July 18, 2232. There are no annular or hybrid eclipses in this set. The series ends at member 73 as a partial eclipse on October 25, 2394. Its eclipses are tabulated in three columns; every third eclipse in the same column is one exeligmos apart, so they all cast shadows over approximately the same parts of the Earth.

The longest duration of totality was produced by member 30 at 6 minutes, 41 seconds on July 11, 1619. All eclipses in this series occur at the Moon’s descending node of orbit.

Series members 41–62 occur between 1801 and 2200:
41	42	43
November 9, 1817	November 20, 1835	November 30, 1853
44	45	46
December 12, 1871	December 22, 1889	January 3, 1908
47	48	49
January 14, 1926	January 25, 1944	February 5, 1962
50	51	52
February 16, 1980	February 26, 1998	March 9, 2016
53	54	55
March 20, 2034	March 30, 2052	April 11, 2070
56	57	58
April 21, 2088	May 3, 2106	May 14, 2124
59	60	61
May 25, 2142	June 4, 2160	June 16, 2178
62
June 26, 2196

=== Metonic series ===
The metonic series repeats eclipses every 19 years (6939.69 days), lasting about 5 cycles. Eclipses occur in nearly the same calendar date. In addition, the octon subseries repeats 1/5 of that or every 3.8 years (1387.94 days). All eclipses in this table occur at the Moon's descending node.

22 eclipse events between July 3, 2065 and November 26, 2152
July 3–4	April 21–23	February 7–8	November 26–27	September 13–15
118	120	122	124	126
July 3, 2065	April 21, 2069	February 7, 2073	November 26, 2076	September 13, 2080
128	130	132	134	136
July 3, 2084	April 21, 2088	February 7, 2092	November 27, 2095	September 14, 2099
138	140	142	144	146
July 4, 2103	April 23, 2107	February 8, 2111	November 27, 2114	September 15, 2118
148	150	152	154	156
July 4, 2122	April 22, 2126	February 8, 2130	November 26, 2133	September 15, 2137
158	160	162	164	
July 3, 2141			November 26, 2152	

=== Tritos series ===
This eclipse is a part of a tritos cycle, repeating at alternating nodes every 135 synodic months (≈ 3986.63 days, or 11 years minus 1 month). Their appearance and longitude are irregular due to a lack of synchronization with the anomalistic month (period of perigee), but groupings of 3 tritos cycles (≈ 33 years minus 3 months) come close (≈ 434.044 anomalistic months), so eclipses are similar in these groupings.

Series members between 1837 and 2200
April 5, 1837 (Saros 107)	March 5, 1848 (Saros 108)	February 3, 1859 (Saros 109)		December 2, 1880 (Saros 111)
		August 31, 1913 (Saros 114)	July 31, 1924 (Saros 115)	June 30, 1935 (Saros 116)
May 30, 1946 (Saros 117)	April 30, 1957 (Saros 118)	March 28, 1968 (Saros 119)	February 26, 1979 (Saros 120)	January 26, 1990 (Saros 121)
December 25, 2000 (Saros 122)	November 25, 2011 (Saros 123)	October 25, 2022 (Saros 124)	September 23, 2033 (Saros 125)	August 23, 2044 (Saros 126)
July 24, 2055 (Saros 127)	June 22, 2066 (Saros 128)	May 22, 2077 (Saros 129)	April 21, 2088 (Saros 130)	March 21, 2099 (Saros 131)
February 18, 2110 (Saros 132)	January 19, 2121 (Saros 133)	December 19, 2131 (Saros 134)	November 17, 2142 (Saros 135)	October 17, 2153 (Saros 136)
September 16, 2164 (Saros 137)	August 16, 2175 (Saros 138)	July 16, 2186 (Saros 139)	June 15, 2197 (Saros 140)	

=== Inex series ===
This eclipse is a part of the long period inex cycle, repeating at alternating nodes, every 358 synodic months (≈ 10,571.95 days, or 29 years minus 20 days). Their appearance and longitude are irregular due to a lack of synchronization with the anomalistic month (period of perigee). However, groupings of 3 inex cycles (≈ 87 years minus 2 months) comes close (≈ 1,151.02 anomalistic months), so eclipses are similar in these groupings.

Series members between 1801 and 2200
October 20, 1827 (Saros 121)	September 29, 1856 (Saros 122)	September 8, 1885 (Saros 123)
August 21, 1914 (Saros 124)	August 1, 1943 (Saros 125)	July 10, 1972 (Saros 126)
June 21, 2001 (Saros 127)	June 1, 2030 (Saros 128)	May 11, 2059 (Saros 129)
April 21, 2088 (Saros 130)	April 2, 2117 (Saros 131)	March 12, 2146 (Saros 132)
February 21, 2175 (Saros 133)		
