= Solar eclipse of July 23, 2093 =

Future annular solar eclipse

- Annular eclipse
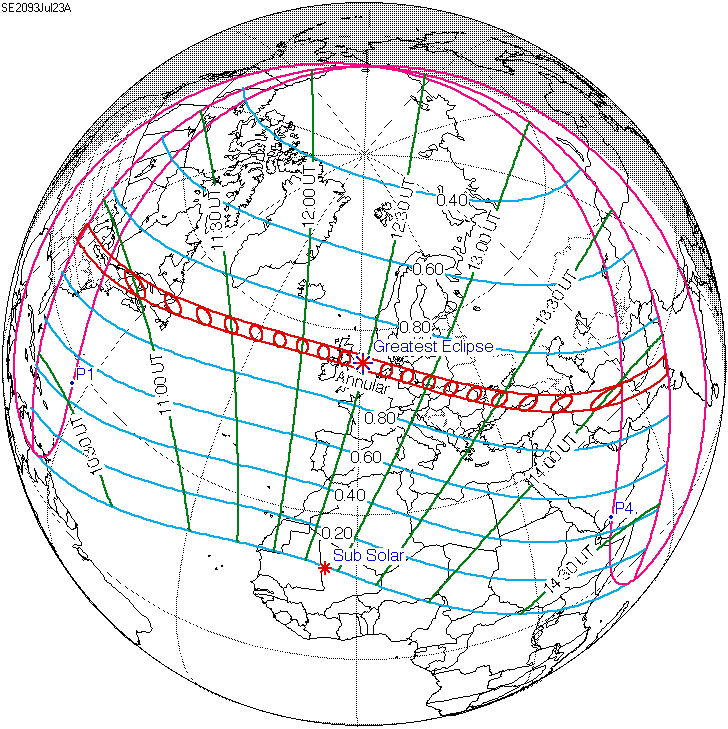
- Map
- Gamma: 0.5717
- Magnitude: 0.9463

Maximum eclipse
- Duration: 311 s (5 min 11 s)
- Coordinates: 54.6°N 1.3°E
- Max. width of band: 241 km (150 mi)

Times (UTC)
- Greatest eclipse: 12:32:04

References
- Saros: 147 (27 of 80)
- Catalog # (SE5000): 9717

An annular solar eclipse will occur at the Moon's ascending node of orbit on Thursday, July 23, 2093, with a magnitude of 0.9463. A solar eclipse occurs when the Moon passes between Earth and the Sun, thereby totally or partly obscuring the image of the Sun for a viewer on Earth. An annular solar eclipse occurs when the Moon's apparent diameter is smaller than the Sun's, blocking most of the Sun's light and causing the Sun to look like an annulus (ring). An annular eclipse appears as a partial eclipse over a region of the Earth thousands of kilometres wide. Occurring about 1.1 days after apogee (on July 22, 2093, at 10:10 UTC), the Moon's apparent diameter will be smaller.

The path of annularity will be visible from parts of Illinois, Indiana, Ohio, Michigan, Pennsylvania, New York, Vermont, New Hampshire, and Maine in the United States, southeastern Canada, Ireland, the United Kingdom, the Netherlands, Germany, the Czech Republic, Poland, Slovakia, Hungary, Ukraine, Romania, Moldova, Turkey, Iraq, Iran, Pakistan, and western India. A partial solar eclipse will also be visible for parts of eastern North America, the Caribbean, Europe, North Africa, Central Asia, North Asia, and South Asia.

== Eclipse details ==
Shown below are two tables displaying details about this particular solar eclipse. The first table outlines times at which the Moon's penumbra or umbra attains the specific parameter, and the second table describes various other parameters pertaining to this eclipse.

July 23, 2093 Solar Eclipse Times
Event	Time (UTC)
First Penumbral External Contact	2093 July 23 at 09:39:24.9 UTC
First Umbral External Contact	2093 July 23 at 10:52:14.3 UTC
First Central Line	2093 July 23 at 10:55:00.8 UTC
First Umbral Internal Contact	2093 July 23 at 10:57:48.8 UTC
Equatorial Conjunction	2093 July 23 at 12:23:43.7 UTC
Greatest Duration	2093 July 23 at 12:27:42.7 UTC
Greatest Eclipse	2093 July 23 at 12:32:03.8 UTC
Ecliptic Conjunction	2093 July 23 at 12:38:51.2 UTC
Last Umbral Internal Contact	2093 July 23 at 14:06:25.3 UTC
Last Central Line	2093 July 23 at 14:09:12.6 UTC
Last Umbral External Contact	2093 July 23 at 14:11:58.3 UTC
Last Penumbral External Contact	2093 July 23 at 15:24:45.2 UTC

July 23, 2093 Solar Eclipse Parameters
Parameter	Value
Eclipse Magnitude	0.94634
Eclipse Obscuration	0.89557
Gamma	0.57165
Sun Right Ascension	08h14m45.4s
Sun Declination	+19°49'29.6"
Sun Semi-Diameter	15'44.6"
Sun Equatorial Horizontal Parallax	08.7"
Moon Right Ascension	08h15m01.4s
Moon Declination	+20°20'03.3"
Moon Semi-Diameter	14'43.0"
Moon Equatorial Horizontal Parallax	0°54'00.8"
ΔT	117.4 s

== Eclipse season ==
This eclipse is part of an eclipse season, a period, roughly every six months, when eclipses occur. Only two (or occasionally three) eclipse seasons occur each year, and each season lasts about 35 days and repeats just short of six months (173 days) later; thus two full eclipse seasons always occur each year. Either two or three eclipses happen each eclipse season. In the sequence below, each eclipse is separated by a fortnight.

Eclipse season of July 2093
July 8 Descending node (full moon)	July 23 Ascending node (new moon)
Partial lunar eclipse Lunar Saros 121	Annular solar eclipse Solar Saros 147

== Related eclipses ==
=== Eclipses in 2093 ===
- A penumbral lunar eclipse on January 12.
- A total solar eclipse on January 27.
- A partial lunar eclipse on July 8.
- An annular solar eclipse on July 23.

=== Metonic ===
- Preceded by: Solar eclipse of October 4, 2089
- Followed by: Solar eclipse of May 11, 2097

=== Tzolkinex ===
- Preceded by: Solar eclipse of June 11, 2086
- Followed by: Solar eclipse of September 4, 2100

=== Half-Saros ===
- Preceded by: Lunar eclipse of July 17, 2084
- Followed by: Lunar eclipse of July 30, 2102

=== Tritos ===
- Preceded by: Solar eclipse of August 24, 2082
- Followed by: Solar eclipse of June 22, 2104

=== Solar Saros 147 ===
- Preceded by: Solar eclipse of July 13, 2075
- Followed by: Solar eclipse of August 4, 2111

=== Inex ===
- Preceded by: Solar eclipse of August 12, 2064
- Followed by: Solar eclipse of July 4, 2122

=== Triad ===
- Preceded by: Solar eclipse of September 22, 2006
- Followed by: Solar eclipse of May 24, 2180

=== Solar eclipses of 2091–2094 ===
This eclipse is a member of a semester series. An eclipse in a semester series of solar eclipses repeats approximately every 177 days and 4 hours (a semester) at alternating nodes of the Moon's orbit.

The partial solar eclipses on June 13, 2094 and December 7, 2094 occur in the next lunar year eclipse set.

Solar eclipse series sets from 2091 to 2094
Descending node			Ascending node		
Saros	Map	Gamma	Saros	Map	Gamma
122	February 18, 2091 Partial	1.1779	127	August 15, 2091 Total	−0.949
132	February 7, 2092 Annular	0.4322	137	August 3, 2092 Annular	−0.2044
142	January 27, 2093 Total	−0.2737	147	July 23, 2093 Annular	0.5717
152	January 16, 2094 Total	−0.9333	157	July 12, 2094 Partial	1.3150

=== Saros 147 ===
This eclipse is a part of Saros series 147, repeating every 18 years, 11 days, and containing 80 events. The series started with a partial solar eclipse on October 12, 1624. It contains annular eclipses from May 31, 2003 through July 31, 2706. There are no hybrid or total eclipses in this set. The series ends at member 80 as a partial eclipse on February 24, 3049. Its eclipses are tabulated in three columns; every third eclipse in the same column is one exeligmos apart, so they all cast shadows over approximately the same parts of the Earth.

The longest duration of annularity will be produced by member 38 at 9 minutes, 41 seconds on November 21, 2291. All eclipses in this series occur at the Moon’s ascending node of orbit.

Series members 11–32 occur between 1801 and 2200:
11	12	13
January 30, 1805	February 11, 1823	February 21, 1841
14	15	16
March 4, 1859	March 15, 1877	March 26, 1895
17	18	19
April 6, 1913	April 18, 1931	April 28, 1949
20	21	22
May 9, 1967	May 19, 1985	May 31, 2003
23	24	25
June 10, 2021	June 21, 2039	July 1, 2057
26	27	28
July 13, 2075	July 23, 2093	August 4, 2111
29	30	31
August 15, 2129	August 26, 2147	September 5, 2165
32
September 16, 2183

=== Metonic series ===
The metonic series repeats eclipses every 19 years (6939.69 days), lasting about 5 cycles. Eclipses occur in nearly the same calendar date. In addition, the octon subseries repeats 1/5 of that or every 3.8 years (1387.94 days). All eclipses in this table occur at the Moon's ascending node.

21 eclipse events between July 23, 2036 and July 23, 2112
July 23–24	May 11	February 27–28	December 16–17	October 4–5
117	119	121	123	125
July 23, 2036	May 11, 2040	February 28, 2044	December 16, 2047	October 4, 2051
127	129	131	133	135
July 24, 2055	May 11, 2059	February 28, 2063	December 17, 2066	October 4, 2070
137	139	141	143	145
July 24, 2074	May 11, 2078	February 27, 2082	December 16, 2085	October 4, 2089
147	149	151	153	155
July 23, 2093	May 11, 2097	February 28, 2101	December 17, 2104	October 5, 2108
157
July 23, 2112

=== Tritos series ===
This eclipse is a part of a tritos cycle, repeating at alternating nodes every 135 synodic months (≈ 3986.63 days, or 11 years minus 1 month). Their appearance and longitude are irregular due to a lack of synchronization with the anomalistic month (period of perigee), but groupings of 3 tritos cycles (≈ 33 years minus 3 months) come close (≈ 434.044 anomalistic months), so eclipses are similar in these groupings.

Series members between 1801 and 2200
October 9, 1809 (Saros 121)	September 7, 1820 (Saros 122)	August 7, 1831 (Saros 123)	July 8, 1842 (Saros 124)	June 6, 1853 (Saros 125)
May 6, 1864 (Saros 126)	April 6, 1875 (Saros 127)	March 5, 1886 (Saros 128)	February 1, 1897 (Saros 129)	January 3, 1908 (Saros 130)
December 3, 1918 (Saros 131)	November 1, 1929 (Saros 132)	October 1, 1940 (Saros 133)	September 1, 1951 (Saros 134)	July 31, 1962 (Saros 135)
June 30, 1973 (Saros 136)	May 30, 1984 (Saros 137)	April 29, 1995 (Saros 138)	March 29, 2006 (Saros 139)	February 26, 2017 (Saros 140)
January 26, 2028 (Saros 141)	December 26, 2038 (Saros 142)	November 25, 2049 (Saros 143)	October 24, 2060 (Saros 144)	September 23, 2071 (Saros 145)
August 24, 2082 (Saros 146)	July 23, 2093 (Saros 147)	June 22, 2104 (Saros 148)	May 24, 2115 (Saros 149)	April 22, 2126 (Saros 150)
March 21, 2137 (Saros 151)	February 19, 2148 (Saros 152)	January 19, 2159 (Saros 153)	December 18, 2169 (Saros 154)	November 17, 2180 (Saros 155)
October 18, 2191 (Saros 156)

=== Inex series ===
This eclipse is a part of the long period inex cycle, repeating at alternating nodes, every 358 synodic months (≈ 10,571.95 days, or 29 years minus 20 days). Their appearance and longitude are irregular due to a lack of synchronization with the anomalistic month (period of perigee). However, groupings of 3 inex cycles (≈ 87 years minus 2 months) comes close (≈ 1,151.02 anomalistic months), so eclipses are similar in these groupings.

Series members between 1801 and 2200
February 11, 1804 (Saros 137)	January 20, 1833 (Saros 138)	December 31, 1861 (Saros 139)
December 12, 1890 (Saros 140)	November 22, 1919 (Saros 141)	November 1, 1948 (Saros 142)
October 12, 1977 (Saros 143)	September 22, 2006 (Saros 144)	September 2, 2035 (Saros 145)
August 12, 2064 (Saros 146)	July 23, 2093 (Saros 147)	July 4, 2122 (Saros 148)
June 14, 2151 (Saros 149)	May 24, 2180 (Saros 150)	
