= Solar eclipse of September 3, 2081 =

Total eclipse

- Total eclipse
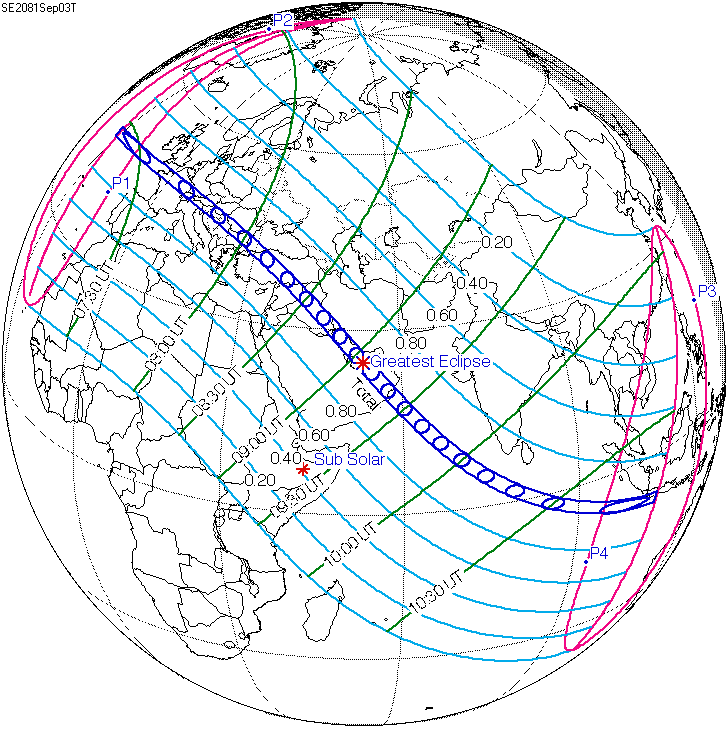
- Map
- Gamma: 0.3378
- Magnitude: 1.072

Maximum eclipse
- Duration: 333 s (5 min 33 s)
- Coordinates: 24.6°N 53.6°E
- Max. width of band: 247 km (153 mi)

Times (UTC)
- Greatest eclipse: 9:07:31

References
- Saros: 136 (41 of 71)
- Catalog # (SE5000): 9690

A total solar eclipse will occur at the Moon's descending node of orbit on Wednesday, September 3, 2081, with a magnitude of 1.072. A solar eclipse occurs when the Moon passes between Earth and the Sun, thereby totally or partly obscuring the image of the Sun for a viewer on Earth. A total solar eclipse occurs when the Moon's apparent diameter is larger than the Sun's, blocking all direct sunlight, turning day into darkness. Totality occurs in a narrow path across Earth's surface, with the partial solar eclipse visible over a surrounding region thousands of kilometres wide. Occurring about 5 hours before perigee (on September 3, 2081, at 14:05 UTC), the Moon's apparent diameter will be larger.

The path of totality will be visible from parts of Guernsey, Jersey, France, Germany, Switzerland, Liechtenstein, Austria, Italy, Slovenia, Croatia, Hungary, Bosnia and Herzegovina, Serbia, Romania, Bulgaria, Turkey, Syria, Iraq, Kuwait, far western Iran, Bahrain, Qatar, the United Arab Emirates, eastern Saudi Arabia, Oman, the Maldives, and southern Indonesia. A partial solar eclipse will also be visible for parts of Greenland, Europe, North Africa, Northeast Africa, the Middle East, Central Asia, South Asia, and Southeast Asia.

== Major cities ==
- Paris
- Basel
- Zurich
- Innsbruck
- Ljubljana
- Zagreb
- Istanbul
- Ankara
- Baghdad
- Basra
- Kuwait City
- Manama
- Doha
- Abu Dhabi
- Male

Mapped using timeanddate.

== Eclipse details ==
Shown below are two tables displaying details about this particular solar eclipse. The first table outlines times at which the Moon's penumbra or umbra attains the specific parameter, and the second table describes various other parameters pertaining to this eclipse.

September 3, 2081 Solar Eclipse Times
| Event | Time (UTC) |
|---|---|
| First Penumbral External Contact | 2081 September 03 at 06:34:05.6 UTC |
| First Umbral External Contact | 2081 September 03 at 07:29:27.5 UTC |
| First Central Line | 2081 September 03 at 07:30:59.4 UTC |
| First Umbral Internal Contact | 2081 September 03 at 07:32:31.4 UTC |
| First Penumbral Internal Contact | 2081 September 03 at 08:34:42.2 UTC |
| Equatorial Conjunction | 2081 September 03 at 08:49:03.4 UTC |
| Ecliptic Conjunction | 2081 September 03 at 09:04:04.6 UTC |
| Greatest Duration | 2081 September 03 at 09:04:30.1 UTC |
| Greatest Eclipse | 2081 September 03 at 09:07:30.5 UTC |
| Last Penumbral Internal Contact | 2081 September 03 at 09:40:43.5 UTC |
| Last Umbral Internal Contact | 2081 September 03 at 10:42:41.1 UTC |
| Last Central Line | 2081 September 03 at 10:44:13.1 UTC |
| Last Umbral External Contact | 2081 September 03 at 10:45:45.0 UTC |
| Last Penumbral External Contact | 2081 September 03 at 11:41:02.7 UTC |

September 3, 2081 Solar Eclipse Parameters
| Parameter | Value |
|---|---|
| Eclipse Magnitude | 1.07198 |
| Eclipse Obscuration | 1.14914 |
| Gamma | 0.33785 |
| Sun Right Ascension | 10h52m00.4s |
| Sun Declination | +07°13'15.0" |
| Sun Semi-Diameter | 15'51.2" |
| Sun Equatorial Horizontal Parallax | 08.7" |
| Moon Right Ascension | 10h52m39.6s |
| Moon Declination | +07°31'30.8" |
| Moon Semi-Diameter | 16'43.4" |
| Moon Equatorial Horizontal Parallax | 1°01'22.4" |
| ΔT | 106.8 s |

== Eclipse season ==
This eclipse is part of an eclipse season, a period, roughly every six months, when eclipses occur. Only two (or occasionally three) eclipse seasons occur each year, and each season lasts about 35 days and repeats just short of six months (173 days) later; thus two full eclipse seasons always occur each year. Either two or three eclipses happen each eclipse season. In the sequence below, each eclipse is separated by a fortnight.

Eclipse season of September 2081
| September 3 Descending node (new moon) | September 18 Ascending node (full moon) |
|---|---|
| Total solar eclipse Solar Saros 136 | Penumbral lunar eclipse Lunar Saros 148 |

== Related eclipses ==
=== Eclipses in 2081 ===
- An annular solar eclipse on March 10.
- A partial lunar eclipse on March 25.
- A total solar eclipse on September 3.
- A penumbral lunar eclipse on September 18.

=== Metonic ===
- Preceded by: Solar eclipse of November 15, 2077
- Followed by: Solar eclipse of June 22, 2085

=== Tzolkinex ===
- Preceded by: Solar eclipse of July 24, 2074
- Followed by: Solar eclipse of October 14, 2088

=== Half-Saros ===
- Preceded by: Lunar eclipse of August 28, 2072
- Followed by: Lunar eclipse of September 8, 2090

=== Tritos ===
- Preceded by: Solar eclipse of October 4, 2070
- Followed by: Solar eclipse of August 3, 2092

=== Solar Saros 136 ===
- Preceded by: Solar eclipse of August 24, 2063
- Followed by: Solar eclipse of September 14, 2099

=== Inex ===
- Preceded by: Solar eclipse of September 22, 2052
- Followed by: Solar eclipse of August 15, 2110

=== Triad ===
- Preceded by: Solar eclipse of November 3, 1994
- Followed by: Solar eclipse of July 5, 2168

=== Solar eclipses of 2080–2083 ===
This eclipse is a member of a semester series. An eclipse in a semester series of solar eclipses repeats approximately every 177 days and 4 hours (a semester) at alternating nodes of the Moon's orbit.

The partial solar eclipse on July 15, 2083 occurs in the next lunar year eclipse set.

Solar eclipse series sets from 2080 to 2083
| Ascending node | | | Descending node | | |
| Saros | Map | Gamma | Saros | Map | Gamma |
| 121 | March 21, 2080 Partial | −1.0578 | 126 | September 13, 2080 Partial | 1.0723 |
| 131 | March 10, 2081 Annular | −0.3653 | 136 | September 3, 2081 Total | 0.3378 |
| 141 | February 27, 2082 Annular | 0.3361 | 146 | August 24, 2082 Total | −0.4004 |
| 151 | February 16, 2083 Partial | 1.017 | 156 | August 13, 2083 Partial | −1.2064 |

=== Saros 136 ===
This eclipse is a part of Saros series 136, repeating every 18 years, 11 days, and containing 71 events. The series started with a partial solar eclipse on June 14, 1360. It contains annular eclipses from September 8, 1504 through November 12, 1594; hybrid eclipses from November 22, 1612 through January 17, 1703; and total eclipses from January 27, 1721 through May 13, 2496. The series ends at member 71 as a partial eclipse on July 30, 2622. Its eclipses are tabulated in three columns; every third eclipse in the same column is one exeligmos apart, so they all cast shadows over approximately the same parts of the Earth.

The longest duration of annularity was produced by member 9 at 32 seconds on September 8, 1504, and the longest duration of totality was produced by member 34 at 7 minutes, 7.74 seconds on June 20, 1955. All eclipses in this series occur at the Moon’s descending node of orbit.

Series members 26–47 occur between 1801 and 2200:
| 26 | 27 | 28 |
|---|---|---|
| March 24, 1811 | April 3, 1829 | April 15, 1847 |
| 29 | 30 | 31 |
| April 25, 1865 | May 6, 1883 | May 18, 1901 |
| 32 | 33 | 34 |
| May 29, 1919 | June 8, 1937 | June 20, 1955 |
| 35 | 36 | 37 |
| June 30, 1973 | July 11, 1991 | July 22, 2009 |
| 38 | 39 | 40 |
| August 2, 2027 | August 12, 2045 | August 24, 2063 |
| 41 | 42 | 43 |
| September 3, 2081 | September 14, 2099 | September 26, 2117 |
| 44 | 45 | 46 |
| October 7, 2135 | October 17, 2153 | October 29, 2171 |
47
November 8, 2189

=== Metonic series ===
The metonic series repeats eclipses every 19 years (6939.69 days), lasting about 5 cycles. Eclipses occur in nearly the same calendar date. In addition, the octon subseries repeats 1/5 of that or every 3.8 years (1387.94 days). All eclipses in this table occur at the Moon's descending node.

22 eclipse events between June 23, 2047 and November 16, 2134
| June 22–23 | April 10–11 | January 27–29 | November 15–16 | September 3–5 |
| 118 | 120 | 122 | 124 | 126 |
|---|---|---|---|---|
| June 23, 2047 | April 11, 2051 | January 27, 2055 | November 16, 2058 | September 3, 2062 |
| 128 | 130 | 132 | 134 | 136 |
| June 22, 2066 | April 11, 2070 | January 27, 2074 | November 15, 2077 | September 3, 2081 |
| 138 | 140 | 142 | 144 | 146 |
| June 22, 2085 | April 10, 2089 | January 27, 2093 | November 15, 2096 | September 4, 2100 |
| 148 | 150 | 152 | 154 | 156 |
| June 22, 2104 | April 11, 2108 | January 29, 2112 | November 16, 2115 | September 5, 2119 |
| 158 | 160 | 162 | 164 | |
| June 23, 2123 | | | November 16, 2134 | |

=== Tritos series ===
This eclipse is a part of a tritos cycle, repeating at alternating nodes every 135 synodic months (≈ 3986.63 days, or 11 years minus 1 month). Their appearance and longitude are irregular due to a lack of synchronization with the anomalistic month (period of perigee), but groupings of 3 tritos cycles (≈ 33 years minus 3 months) come close (≈ 434.044 anomalistic months), so eclipses are similar in these groupings.

Series members between 1801 and 2200
| October 19, 1808 (Saros 111) | September 19, 1819 (Saros 112) | August 18, 1830 (Saros 113) | July 18, 1841 (Saros 114) | June 17, 1852 (Saros 115) |
| May 17, 1863 (Saros 116) | April 16, 1874 (Saros 117) | March 16, 1885 (Saros 118) | February 13, 1896 (Saros 119) | January 14, 1907 (Saros 120) |
| December 14, 1917 (Saros 121) | November 12, 1928 (Saros 122) | October 12, 1939 (Saros 123) | September 12, 1950 (Saros 124) | August 11, 1961 (Saros 125) |
| July 10, 1972 (Saros 126) | June 11, 1983 (Saros 127) | May 10, 1994 (Saros 128) | April 8, 2005 (Saros 129) | March 9, 2016 (Saros 130) |
| February 6, 2027 (Saros 131) | January 5, 2038 (Saros 132) | December 5, 2048 (Saros 133) | November 5, 2059 (Saros 134) | October 4, 2070 (Saros 135) |
| September 3, 2081 (Saros 136) | August 3, 2092 (Saros 137) | July 4, 2103 (Saros 138) | June 3, 2114 (Saros 139) | May 3, 2125 (Saros 140) |
| April 1, 2136 (Saros 141) | March 2, 2147 (Saros 142) | January 30, 2158 (Saros 143) | December 29, 2168 (Saros 144) | November 28, 2179 (Saros 145) |
October 29, 2190 (Saros 146)

=== Inex series ===
This eclipse is a part of the long period inex cycle, repeating at alternating nodes, every 358 synodic months (≈ 10,571.95 days, or 29 years minus 20 days). Their appearance and longitude are irregular due to a lack of synchronization with the anomalistic month (period of perigee). However, groupings of 3 inex cycles (≈ 87 years minus 2 months) comes close (≈ 1,151.02 anomalistic months), so eclipses are similar in these groupings.

Series members between 1801 and 2200
| March 4, 1821 (Saros 127) | February 12, 1850 (Saros 128) | January 22, 1879 (Saros 129) |
| January 3, 1908 (Saros 130) | December 13, 1936 (Saros 131) | November 23, 1965 (Saros 132) |
| November 3, 1994 (Saros 133) | October 14, 2023 (Saros 134) | September 22, 2052 (Saros 135) |
| September 3, 2081 (Saros 136) | August 15, 2110 (Saros 137) | July 25, 2139 (Saros 138) |
| July 5, 2168 (Saros 139) | June 15, 2197 (Saros 140) | |
