= Solar eclipse of July 24, 2055 =

Total eclipse

- Total eclipse
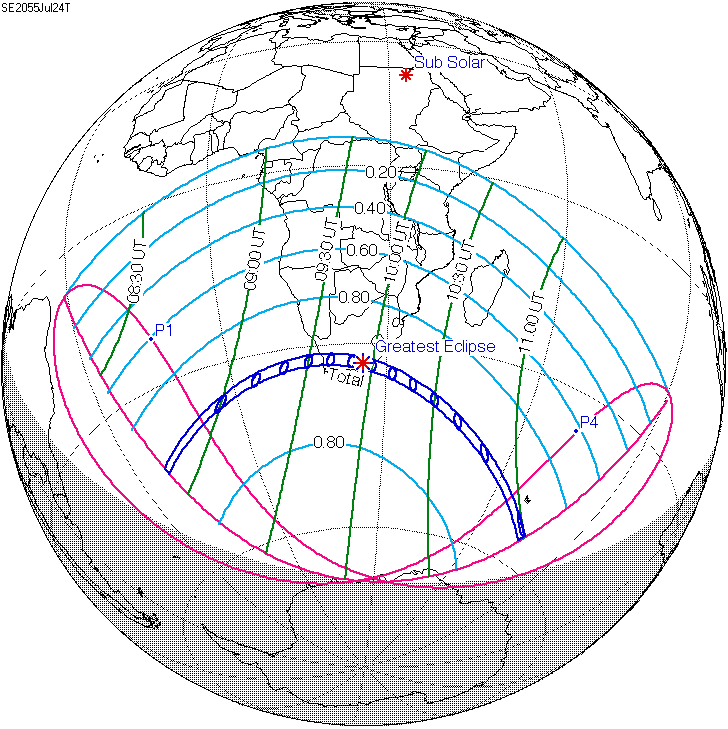
- Map
- Gamma: −0.8012
- Magnitude: 1.0359

Maximum eclipse
- Duration: 197 s (3 min 17 s)
- Coordinates: 33.3°S 25.8°E
- Max. width of band: 202 km (126 mi)

Times (UTC)
- Greatest eclipse: 9:57:50

References
- Saros: 127 (60 of 82)
- Catalog # (SE5000): 9631

A total solar eclipse will occur at the Moon's ascending node of orbit on Saturday, July 24, 2055, with a magnitude of 1.0359. A solar eclipse occurs when the Moon passes between Earth and the Sun, thereby totally or partly obscuring the image of the Sun for a viewer on Earth. A total solar eclipse occurs when the Moon's apparent diameter is larger than the Sun's, blocking all direct sunlight, turning day into darkness. Totality occurs in a narrow path across Earth's surface, with the partial solar eclipse visible over a surrounding region thousands of kilometres wide. Occurring about 2.9 days before perigee (on July 27, 2055, at 6:00 UTC), the Moon's apparent diameter will be larger.

The path of totality will be visible from parts of South Africa. A partial solar eclipse will also be visible for parts of southern and central Africa.

== Eclipse details ==
Shown below are two tables displaying details about this particular solar eclipse. The first table outlines times at which the Moon's penumbra or umbra attains the specific parameter, and the second table describes various other parameters pertaining to this eclipse.

July 24, 2055 Solar Eclipse Times
Event	Time (UTC)
First Penumbral External Contact	2055 July 24 at 07:37:42.2 UTC
First Umbral External Contact	2055 July 24 at 08:53:07.4 UTC
First Central Line	2055 July 24 at 08:54:18.4 UTC
First Umbral Internal Contact	2055 July 24 at 08:55:30.2 UTC
Ecliptic Conjunction	2055 July 24 at 09:49:25.1 UTC
Greatest Eclipse	2055 July 24 at 09:57:50.3 UTC
Greatest Duration	2055 July 24 at 09:58:05.7 UTC
Equatorial Conjunction	2055 July 24 at 10:08:32.6 UTC
Last Umbral Internal Contact	2055 July 24 at 11:00:00.1 UTC
Last Central Line	2055 July 24 at 11:01:14.4 UTC
Last Umbral External Contact	2055 July 24 at 11:02:27.8 UTC
Last Penumbral External Contact	2055 July 24 at 12:17:48.7 UTC

July 24, 2055 Solar Eclipse Parameters
Parameter	Value
Eclipse Magnitude	1.03590
Eclipse Obscuration	1.07308
Gamma	−0.80119
Sun Right Ascension	08h15m04.2s
Sun Declination	+19°48'43.3"
Sun Semi-Diameter	15'44.6"
Sun Equatorial Horizontal Parallax	08.7"
Moon Right Ascension	08h14m39.2s
Moon Declination	+19°01'42.7"
Moon Semi-Diameter	16'09.1"
Moon Equatorial Horizontal Parallax	0°59'16.7"
ΔT	87.5 s

== Eclipse season ==
This eclipse is part of an eclipse season, a period, roughly every six months, when eclipses occur. Only two (or occasionally three) eclipse seasons occur each year, and each season lasts about 35 days and repeats just short of six months (173 days) later; thus two full eclipse seasons always occur each year. Either two or three eclipses happen each eclipse season. In the sequence below, each eclipse is separated by a fortnight.

Eclipse season of July–August 2055
July 24 Ascending node (new moon)	August 7 Descending node (full moon)
Total solar eclipse Solar Saros 127	Partial lunar eclipse Lunar Saros 139

== Related eclipses ==
=== Eclipses in 2055 ===
- A partial solar eclipse on January 27.
- A total lunar eclipse on February 11.
- A total solar eclipse on July 24.
- A partial lunar eclipse on August 7.

=== Metonic ===
- Preceded by: Solar eclipse of October 4, 2051
- Followed by: Solar eclipse of May 11, 2059

=== Tzolkinex ===
- Preceded by: Solar eclipse of June 11, 2048
- Followed by: Solar eclipse of September 3, 2062

=== Half-Saros ===
- Preceded by: Lunar eclipse of July 18, 2046
- Followed by: Lunar eclipse of July 28, 2064

=== Tritos ===
- Preceded by: Solar eclipse of August 23, 2044
- Followed by: Solar eclipse of June 22, 2066

=== Solar Saros 127 ===
- Preceded by: Solar eclipse of July 13, 2037
- Followed by: Solar eclipse of August 3, 2073

=== Inex ===
- Preceded by: Solar eclipse of August 12, 2026
- Followed by: Solar eclipse of July 3, 2084

=== Triad ===
- Preceded by: Solar eclipse of September 22, 1968
- Followed by: Solar eclipse of May 25, 2142

=== Solar eclipses of 2054–2058 ===
This eclipse is a member of a semester series. An eclipse in a semester series of solar eclipses repeats approximately every 177 days and 4 hours (a semester) at alternating nodes of the Moon's orbit.

The partial solar eclipses on March 9, 2054 and September 2, 2054 occur in the previous lunar year eclipse set, and the partial solar eclipses on May 22, 2058 and November 16, 2058 occur in the next lunar year eclipse set.

Solar eclipse series sets from 2054 to 2058
Ascending node			Descending node		
Saros	Map	Gamma	Saros	Map	Gamma
117	August 3, 2054 Partial	−1.4941	122	January 27, 2055 Partial	1.155
127	July 24, 2055 Total	−0.8012	132	January 16, 2056 Annular	0.4199
137	July 12, 2056 Annular	−0.0426	142	January 5, 2057 Total	−0.2837
147	July 1, 2057 Annular	0.7455	152	December 26, 2057 Total	−0.9405
157	June 21, 2058 Partial	1.4869			

=== Saros 127 ===
This eclipse is a part of Saros series 127, repeating every 18 years, 11 days, and containing 82 events. The series started with a partial solar eclipse on October 10, 991 AD. It contains total eclipses from May 14, 1352 through August 15, 2091. There are no annular or hybrid eclipses in this set. The series ends at member 82 as a partial eclipse on March 21, 2452. Its eclipses are tabulated in three columns; every third eclipse in the same column is one exeligmos apart, so they all cast shadows over approximately the same parts of the Earth.

The longest duration of totality was produced by member 31 at 5 minutes, 40 seconds on August 30, 1532. All eclipses in this series occur at the Moon’s ascending node of orbit.

Series members 46–68 occur between 1801 and 2200:
46	47	48
February 21, 1803	March 4, 1821	March 15, 1839
49	50	51
March 25, 1857	April 6, 1875	April 16, 1893
52	53	54
April 28, 1911	May 9, 1929	May 20, 1947
55	56	57
May 30, 1965	June 11, 1983	June 21, 2001
58	59	60
July 2, 2019	July 13, 2037	July 24, 2055
61	62	63
August 3, 2073	August 15, 2091	August 26, 2109
64	65	66
September 6, 2127	September 16, 2145	September 28, 2163
67	68	
October 8, 2181	October 19, 2199	

=== Metonic series ===
The metonic series repeats eclipses every 19 years (6939.69 days), lasting about 5 cycles. Eclipses occur in nearly the same calendar date. In addition, the octon subseries repeats 1/5 of that or every 3.8 years (1387.94 days). All eclipses in this table occur at the Moon's ascending node.

21 eclipse events between July 23, 2036 and July 23, 2112
July 23–24	May 11	February 27–28	December 16–17	October 4–5
117	119	121	123	125
July 23, 2036	May 11, 2040	February 28, 2044	December 16, 2047	October 4, 2051
127	129	131	133	135
July 24, 2055	May 11, 2059	February 28, 2063	December 17, 2066	October 4, 2070
137	139	141	143	145
July 24, 2074	May 11, 2078	February 27, 2082	December 16, 2085	October 4, 2089
147	149	151	153	155
July 23, 2093	May 11, 2097	February 28, 2101	December 17, 2104	October 5, 2108
157
July 23, 2112

=== Tritos series ===
This eclipse is a part of a tritos cycle, repeating at alternating nodes every 135 synodic months (≈ 3986.63 days, or 11 years minus 1 month). Their appearance and longitude are irregular due to a lack of synchronization with the anomalistic month (period of perigee), but groupings of 3 tritos cycles (≈ 33 years minus 3 months) come close (≈ 434.044 anomalistic months), so eclipses are similar in these groupings.

Series members between 1837 and 2200
April 5, 1837 (Saros 107)	March 5, 1848 (Saros 108)	February 3, 1859 (Saros 109)		December 2, 1880 (Saros 111)
		August 31, 1913 (Saros 114)	July 31, 1924 (Saros 115)	June 30, 1935 (Saros 116)
May 30, 1946 (Saros 117)	April 30, 1957 (Saros 118)	March 28, 1968 (Saros 119)	February 26, 1979 (Saros 120)	January 26, 1990 (Saros 121)
December 25, 2000 (Saros 122)	November 25, 2011 (Saros 123)	October 25, 2022 (Saros 124)	September 23, 2033 (Saros 125)	August 23, 2044 (Saros 126)
July 24, 2055 (Saros 127)	June 22, 2066 (Saros 128)	May 22, 2077 (Saros 129)	April 21, 2088 (Saros 130)	March 21, 2099 (Saros 131)
February 18, 2110 (Saros 132)	January 19, 2121 (Saros 133)	December 19, 2131 (Saros 134)	November 17, 2142 (Saros 135)	October 17, 2153 (Saros 136)
September 16, 2164 (Saros 137)	August 16, 2175 (Saros 138)	July 16, 2186 (Saros 139)	June 15, 2197 (Saros 140)	

=== Inex series ===
This eclipse is a part of the long period inex cycle, repeating at alternating nodes, every 358 synodic months (≈ 10,571.95 days, or 29 years minus 20 days). Their appearance and longitude are irregular due to a lack of synchronization with the anomalistic month (period of perigee). However, groupings of 3 inex cycles (≈ 87 years minus 2 months) comes close (≈ 1,151.02 anomalistic months), so eclipses are similar in these groupings.

Series members between 1801 and 2200
January 1, 1824 (Saros 119)	December 11, 1852 (Saros 120)	November 21, 1881 (Saros 121)
November 2, 1910 (Saros 122)	October 12, 1939 (Saros 123)	September 22, 1968 (Saros 124)
September 2, 1997 (Saros 125)	August 12, 2026 (Saros 126)	July 24, 2055 (Saros 127)
July 3, 2084 (Saros 128)	June 13, 2113 (Saros 129)	May 25, 2142 (Saros 130)
May 5, 2171 (Saros 131)	April 14, 2200 (Saros 132)	
