= Solar eclipse of June 22, 2066 =

Future annular solar eclipse

- Annular eclipse
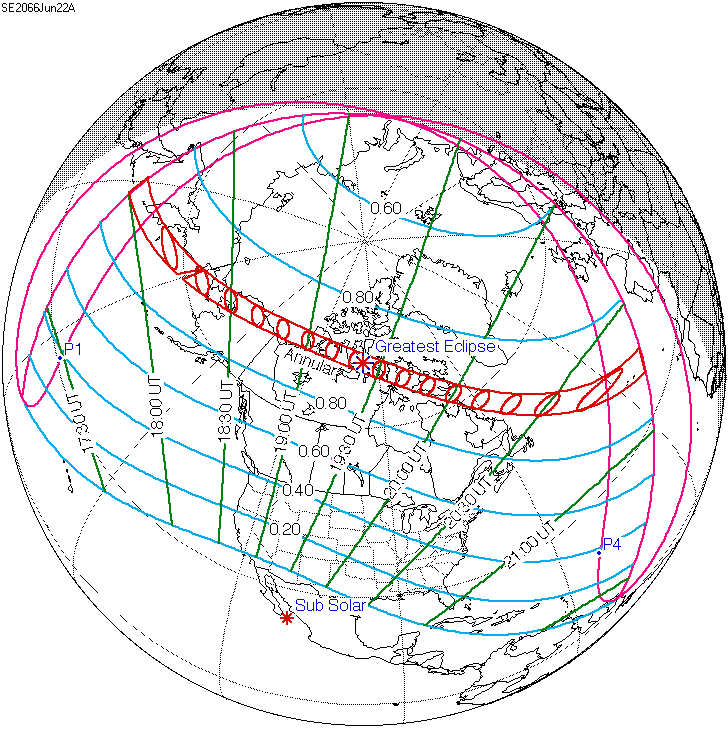
- Map
- Gamma: 0.733
- Magnitude: 0.9435

Maximum eclipse
- Duration: 280 s (4 min 40 s)
- Coordinates: 70.1°N 96.4°W
- Max. width of band: 309 km (192 mi)

Times (UTC)
- Greatest eclipse: 19:25:48

References
- Saros: 128 (61 of 73)
- Catalog # (SE5000): 9656

An annular solar eclipse will occur at the Moon's descending node of orbit on Tuesday, June 22, 2066, with a magnitude of 0.9435. A solar eclipse occurs when the Moon passes between Earth and the Sun, thereby totally or partly obscuring the image of the Sun for a viewer on Earth. An annular solar eclipse occurs when the Moon's apparent diameter is smaller than the Sun's, blocking most of the Sun's light and causing the Sun to look like an annulus (ring). An annular eclipse appears as a partial eclipse over a region of the Earth thousands of kilometres wide. Occurring about 8 hours after apogee (on June 22, 2066, at 11:30 UTC), the Moon's apparent diameter will be smaller.

The path of annularity will be visible from parts of the Russian Far East, Alaska, northern Canada, and the Azores. A partial solar eclipse will also be visible for parts of northern Russia, Canada, Greenland, the United States, the Caribbean, Northern Europe, and Western Europe.

== Eclipse details ==
Shown below are two tables displaying details about this particular solar eclipse. The first table outlines times at which the Moon's penumbra or umbra attains the specific parameter, and the second table describes various other parameters pertaining to this eclipse.

June 22, 2066 Solar Eclipse Times
Event	Time (UTC)
First Penumbral External Contact	2066 June 22 at 16:41:43.1 UTC
First Umbral External Contact	2066 June 22 at 18:02:00.7 UTC
First Central Line	2066 June 22 at 18:05:23.1 UTC
First Umbral Internal Contact	2066 June 22 at 18:08:50.3 UTC
Equatorial Conjunction	2066 June 22 at 19:15:57.6 UTC
Ecliptic Conjunction	2066 June 22 at 19:17:05.8 UTC
Greatest Duration	2066 June 22 at 19:22:58.8 UTC
Greatest Eclipse	2066 June 22 at 19:25:47.7 UTC
Last Umbral Internal Contact	2066 June 22 at 20:42:52.0 UTC
Last Central Line	2066 June 22 at 20:46:18.8 UTC
Last Umbral External Contact	2066 June 22 at 20:49:40.9 UTC
Last Penumbral External Contact	2066 June 22 at 22:09:56.0 UTC

June 22, 2066 Solar Eclipse Parameters
Parameter	Value
Eclipse Magnitude	0.94346
Eclipse Obscuration	0.89012
Gamma	0.73297
Sun Right Ascension	06h07m28.7s
Sun Declination	+23°25'11.2"
Sun Semi-Diameter	15'44.2"
Sun Equatorial Horizontal Parallax	08.7"
Moon Right Ascension	06h07m48.1s
Moon Declination	+24°04'22.4"
Moon Semi-Diameter	14'42.0"
Moon Equatorial Horizontal Parallax	0°53'57.0"
ΔT	94.9 s

== Eclipse season ==
This eclipse is part of an eclipse season, a period, roughly every six months, when eclipses occur. Only two (or occasionally three) eclipse seasons occur each year, and each season lasts about 35 days and repeats just short of six months (173 days) later; thus two full eclipse seasons always occur each year. Either two or three eclipses happen each eclipse season. In the sequence below, each eclipse is separated by a fortnight.

Eclipse season of June–July 2066
June 22 Descending node (new moon)	July 7 Ascending node (full moon)
Annular solar eclipse Solar Saros 128	Partial lunar eclipse Lunar Saros 140

== Related eclipses ==
=== Eclipses in 2066 ===
- A total lunar eclipse on January 11.
- An annular solar eclipse on June 22.
- A partial lunar eclipse on July 7.
- A total solar eclipse on December 17.
- A penumbral lunar eclipse on December 31.

=== Metonic ===
- Preceded by: Solar eclipse of September 3, 2062
- Followed by: Solar eclipse of April 11, 2070

=== Tzolkinex ===
- Preceded by: Solar eclipse of May 11, 2059
- Followed by: Solar eclipse of August 3, 2073

=== Half-Saros ===
- Preceded by: Lunar eclipse of June 17, 2057
- Followed by: Lunar eclipse of June 28, 2075

=== Tritos ===
- Preceded by: Solar eclipse of July 24, 2055
- Followed by: Solar eclipse of May 22, 2077

=== Solar Saros 128 ===
- Preceded by: Solar eclipse of June 11, 2048
- Followed by: Solar eclipse of July 3, 2084

=== Inex ===
- Preceded by: Solar eclipse of July 13, 2037
- Followed by: Solar eclipse of June 2, 2095

=== Triad ===
- Preceded by: Solar eclipse of August 22, 1979
- Followed by: Solar eclipse of April 23, 2153

=== Solar eclipses of 2065–2069 ===
This eclipse is a member of a semester series. An eclipse in a semester series of solar eclipses repeats approximately every 177 days and 4 hours (a semester) at alternating nodes of the Moon's orbit.

The partial solar eclipses on February 5, 2065 and August 2, 2065 occur in the previous lunar year eclipse set, and the partial solar eclipses on April 21, 2069 and October 15, 2069 occur in the next lunar year eclipse set.

Solar eclipse series sets from 2065 to 2069
Descending node			Ascending node		
Saros	Map	Gamma	Saros	Map	Gamma
118	July 3, 2065 Partial	1.4619	123	December 27, 2065 Partial	−1.0688
128	June 22, 2066 Annular	0.733	133	December 17, 2066 Total	−0.4043
138	June 11, 2067 Annular	−0.0387	143	December 6, 2067 Hybrid	0.2845
148	May 31, 2068 Total	−0.797	153	November 24, 2068 Partial	1.0299
158	May 20, 2069 Partial	−1.4852			

=== Saros 128 ===
This eclipse is a part of Saros series 128, repeating every 18 years, 11 days, and containing 73 events. The series started with a partial solar eclipse on August 29, 984 AD. It contains total eclipses from May 16, 1417 through June 18, 1471; hybrid eclipses from June 28, 1489 through July 31, 1543; and annular eclipses from August 11, 1561 through July 25, 2120. The series ends at member 73 as a partial eclipse on November 1, 2282. Its eclipses are tabulated in three columns; every third eclipse in the same column is one exeligmos apart, so they all cast shadows over approximately the same parts of the Earth.

The longest duration of totality was produced by member 27 at 1 minutes, 45 seconds on June 7, 1453, and the longest duration of annularity was produced by member 48 at 8 minutes, 35 seconds on February 1, 1832. All eclipses in this series occur at the Moon’s descending node of orbit.

Series members 47–68 occur between 1801 and 2200:
47	48	49
January 21, 1814	February 1, 1832	February 12, 1850
50	51	52
February 23, 1868	March 5, 1886	March 17, 1904
53	54	55
March 28, 1922	April 7, 1940	April 19, 1958
56	57	58
April 29, 1976	May 10, 1994	May 20, 2012
59	60	61
June 1, 2030	June 11, 2048	June 22, 2066
62	63	64
July 3, 2084	July 15, 2102	July 25, 2120
65	66	67
August 5, 2138	August 16, 2156	August 27, 2174
68
September 6, 2192

=== Metonic series ===
The metonic series repeats eclipses every 19 years (6939.69 days), lasting about 5 cycles. Eclipses occur in nearly the same calendar date. In addition, the octon subseries repeats 1/5 of that or every 3.8 years (1387.94 days). All eclipses in this table occur at the Moon's descending node.

22 eclipse events between June 23, 2047 and November 16, 2134
June 22–23	April 10–11	January 27–29	November 15–16	September 3–5
118	120	122	124	126
June 23, 2047	April 11, 2051	January 27, 2055	November 16, 2058	September 3, 2062
128	130	132	134	136
June 22, 2066	April 11, 2070	January 27, 2074	November 15, 2077	September 3, 2081
138	140	142	144	146
June 22, 2085	April 10, 2089	January 27, 2093	November 15, 2096	September 4, 2100
148	150	152	154	156
June 22, 2104	April 11, 2108	January 29, 2112	November 16, 2115	September 5, 2119
158	160	162	164	
June 23, 2123			November 16, 2134	

=== Tritos series ===
This eclipse is a part of a tritos cycle, repeating at alternating nodes every 135 synodic months (≈ 3986.63 days, or 11 years minus 1 month). Their appearance and longitude are irregular due to a lack of synchronization with the anomalistic month (period of perigee), but groupings of 3 tritos cycles (≈ 33 years minus 3 months) come close (≈ 434.044 anomalistic months), so eclipses are similar in these groupings.

Series members between 1837 and 2200
April 5, 1837 (Saros 107)	March 5, 1848 (Saros 108)	February 3, 1859 (Saros 109)		December 2, 1880 (Saros 111)
		August 31, 1913 (Saros 114)	July 31, 1924 (Saros 115)	June 30, 1935 (Saros 116)
May 30, 1946 (Saros 117)	April 30, 1957 (Saros 118)	March 28, 1968 (Saros 119)	February 26, 1979 (Saros 120)	January 26, 1990 (Saros 121)
December 25, 2000 (Saros 122)	November 25, 2011 (Saros 123)	October 25, 2022 (Saros 124)	September 23, 2033 (Saros 125)	August 23, 2044 (Saros 126)
July 24, 2055 (Saros 127)	June 22, 2066 (Saros 128)	May 22, 2077 (Saros 129)	April 21, 2088 (Saros 130)	March 21, 2099 (Saros 131)
February 18, 2110 (Saros 132)	January 19, 2121 (Saros 133)	December 19, 2131 (Saros 134)	November 17, 2142 (Saros 135)	October 17, 2153 (Saros 136)
September 16, 2164 (Saros 137)	August 16, 2175 (Saros 138)	July 16, 2186 (Saros 139)	June 15, 2197 (Saros 140)	

=== Inex series ===
This eclipse is a part of the long period inex cycle, repeating at alternating nodes, every 358 synodic months (≈ 10,571.95 days, or 29 years minus 20 days). Their appearance and longitude are irregular due to a lack of synchronization with the anomalistic month (period of perigee). However, groupings of 3 inex cycles (≈ 87 years minus 2 months) comes close (≈ 1,151.02 anomalistic months), so eclipses are similar in these groupings.

Series members between 1801 and 2200
December 21, 1805 (Saros 119)	November 30, 1834 (Saros 120)	November 11, 1863 (Saros 121)
October 20, 1892 (Saros 122)	October 1, 1921 (Saros 123)	September 12, 1950 (Saros 124)
August 22, 1979 (Saros 125)	August 1, 2008 (Saros 126)	July 13, 2037 (Saros 127)
June 22, 2066 (Saros 128)	June 2, 2095 (Saros 129)	May 14, 2124 (Saros 130)
April 23, 2153 (Saros 131)	April 3, 2182 (Saros 132)	
