= Solar eclipse of November 15, 2096 =

Future annular solar eclipse

- Annular eclipse
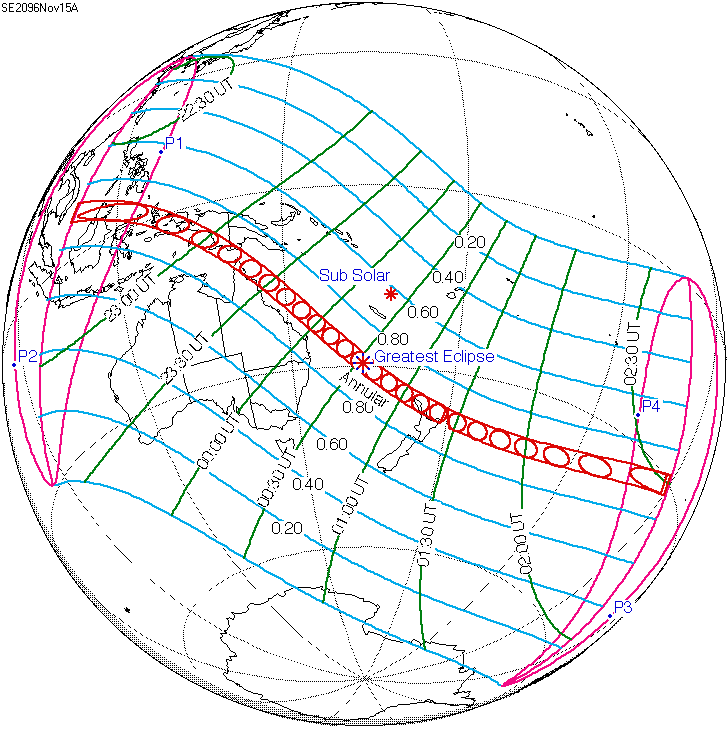
- Map
- Gamma: −0.20
- Magnitude: 0.9237

Maximum eclipse
- Duration: 533 s (8 min 53 s)
- Coordinates: 29.7°S 163.3°E
- Max. width of band: 294 km (183 mi)

Times (UTC)
- Greatest eclipse: 0:36:15

References
- Saros: 144 (21 of 70)
- Catalog # (SE5000): 9725

An annular solar eclipse will occur at the Moon's descending node of orbit between Wednesday, November 14 and Thursday, November 15, 2096, with a magnitude of 0.9237. A solar eclipse occurs when the Moon passes between Earth and the Sun, thereby totally or partly obscuring the image of the Sun for a viewer on Earth. An annular solar eclipse occurs when the Moon's apparent diameter is smaller than the Sun's, blocking most of the Sun's light and causing the Sun to look like an annulus (ring). An annular eclipse appears as a partial eclipse over a region of the Earth thousands of kilometres wide. Occurring about 1.2 days before apogee (on November 16, 2096, at 5:05 UTC), the Moon's apparent diameter will be smaller.

The path of annularity will be visible from parts of Malaysia, Brunei, Indonesia, Papua New Guinea, northeastern Australia, and New Zealand. A partial solar eclipse will also be visible for parts of Southeast Asia, Australia, Oceania, and Antarctica.

== Eclipse details ==
Shown below are two tables displaying details about this particular solar eclipse. The first table outlines times at which the Moon's penumbra or umbra attains the specific parameter, and the second table describes various other parameters pertaining to this eclipse.

November 15, 2096 Solar Eclipse Times
Event	Time (UTC)
First Penumbral External Contact	2096 November 14 at 21:30:31.9 UTC
First Umbral External Contact	2096 November 14 at 22:36:23.1 UTC
First Central Line	2096 November 14 at 22:39:40.3 UTC
First Umbral Internal Contact	2096 November 14 at 22:42:57.9 UTC
First Penumbral Internal Contact	2096 November 14 at 23:51:31.4 UTC
Greatest Eclipse	2096 November 15 at 00:36:14.8 UTC
Ecliptic Conjunction	2096 November 15 at 00:38:40.8 UTC
Equatorial Conjunction	2096 November 15 at 00:45:04.6 UTC
Greatest Duration	2096 November 15 at 00:52:33.0 UTC
Last Penumbral Internal Contact	2096 November 15 at 01:20:44.7 UTC
Last Umbral Internal Contact	2096 November 15 at 02:29:25.5 UTC
Last Central Line	2096 November 15 at 02:32:43.9 UTC
Last Umbral External Contact	2096 November 15 at 02:36:02.1 UTC
Last Penumbral External Contact	2096 November 15 at 03:41:56.0 UTC

November 15, 2096 Solar Eclipse Parameters
Parameter	Value
Eclipse Magnitude	0.92371
Eclipse Obscuration	0.85323
Gamma	−0.20182
Sun Right Ascension	15h25m10.4s
Sun Declination	-18°40'58.6"
Sun Semi-Diameter	16'10.0"
Sun Equatorial Horizontal Parallax	08.9"
Moon Right Ascension	15h24m54.6s
Moon Declination	-18°51'10.6"
Moon Semi-Diameter	14'42.9"
Moon Equatorial Horizontal Parallax	0°54'00.1"
ΔT	120.5 s

== Eclipse season ==
This eclipse is part of an eclipse season, a period, roughly every six months, when eclipses occur. Only two (or occasionally three) eclipse seasons occur each year, and each season lasts about 35 days and repeats just short of six months (173 days) later; thus two full eclipse seasons always occur each year. Either two or three eclipses happen each eclipse season. In the sequence below, each eclipse is separated by a fortnight. The first and last eclipse in this sequence is separated by one synodic month.

Eclipse season of October–November 2096
October 31 Ascending node (full moon)	November 15 Descending node (new moon)	November 29 Ascending node (full moon)
Penumbral lunar eclipse Lunar Saros 118	Annular solar eclipse Solar Saros 144	Penumbral lunar eclipse Lunar Saros 156

== Related eclipses ==
=== Eclipses in 2096 ===
- A penumbral lunar eclipse on May 7.
- A total solar eclipse on May 21–22.
- A penumbral lunar eclipse on June 5–6.
- A penumbral lunar eclipse on October 31.
- An annular solar eclipse on November 14–15.
- A penumbral lunar eclipse on November 29.

=== Metonic ===
- Preceded by: Solar eclipse of January 27, 2093
- Followed by: Solar eclipse of September 4, 2100

=== Tzolkinex ===
- Preceded by: Solar eclipse of October 4, 2089
- Followed by: Solar eclipse of December 29, 2103

=== Half-Saros ===
- Preceded by: Lunar eclipse of November 10, 2087
- Followed by: Lunar eclipse of November 21, 2105

=== Tritos ===
- Preceded by: Solar eclipse of December 16, 2085
- Followed by: Solar eclipse of October 16, 2107

=== Solar Saros 144 ===
- Preceded by: Solar eclipse of November 4, 2078
- Followed by: Solar eclipse of November 27, 2114

=== Inex ===
- Preceded by: Solar eclipse of December 6, 2067
- Followed by: Solar eclipse of October 26, 2125

=== Triad ===
- Preceded by: Solar eclipse of January 15, 2010
- Followed by: Solar eclipse of September 16, 2183

=== Solar eclipses of 2094–2098 ===
This eclipse is a member of a semester series. An eclipse in a semester series of solar eclipses repeats approximately every 177 days and 4 hours (a semester) at alternating nodes of the Moon's orbit.

The solar eclipses on January 16, 2094 (total) and July 12, 2094 (partial) occur in the previous lunar year eclipse set, and the partial solar eclipses on April 1, 2098 and September 25, 2098 occur in the next lunar year eclipse set.

Solar eclipse series sets from 2094 to 2098
Ascending node			Descending node		
Saros	Map	Gamma	Saros	Map	Gamma
119	June 13, 2094 Partial	−1.4613	124	December 7, 2094 Partial	1.1547
129	June 2, 2095 Total	−0.6396	134	November 27, 2095 Annular	0.4903
139	May 22, 2096 Total	0.1196	144	November 15, 2096 Annular	−0.20
149	May 11, 2097 Total	0.8516	154	November 4, 2097 Annular	−0.8926
159	May 1, 2098		164	October 24, 2098 Partial	−1.5407

=== Saros 144 ===
This eclipse is a part of Saros series 144, repeating every 18 years, 11 days, and containing 70 events. The series started with a partial solar eclipse on April 11, 1736. It contains annular eclipses from July 7, 1880 through August 27, 2565. There are no hybrid or total eclipses in this set. The series ends at member 70 as a partial eclipse on May 5, 2980. Its eclipses are tabulated in three columns; every third eclipse in the same column is one exeligmos apart, so they all cast shadows over approximately the same parts of the Earth.

The longest duration of annularity will be produced by member 51 at 9 minutes, 52 seconds on December 29, 2168. All eclipses in this series occur at the Moon’s descending node of orbit.

Series members 5–26 occur between 1801 and 2200:
5	6	7
May 25, 1808	June 5, 1826	June 16, 1844
8	9	10
June 27, 1862	July 7, 1880	July 18, 1898
11	12	13
July 30, 1916	August 10, 1934	August 20, 1952
14	15	16
August 31, 1970	September 11, 1988	September 22, 2006
17	18	19
October 2, 2024	October 14, 2042	October 24, 2060
20	21	22
November 4, 2078	November 15, 2096	November 27, 2114
23	24	25
December 7, 2132	December 19, 2150	December 29, 2168
26
January 9, 2187

=== Metonic series ===
The metonic series repeats eclipses every 19 years (6939.69 days), lasting about 5 cycles. Eclipses occur in nearly the same calendar date. In addition, the octon subseries repeats 1/5 of that or every 3.8 years (1387.94 days). All eclipses in this table occur at the Moon's descending node.

22 eclipse events between June 23, 2047 and November 16, 2134
June 22–23	April 10–11	January 27–29	November 15–16	September 3–5
118	120	122	124	126
June 23, 2047	April 11, 2051	January 27, 2055	November 16, 2058	September 3, 2062
128	130	132	134	136
June 22, 2066	April 11, 2070	January 27, 2074	November 15, 2077	September 3, 2081
138	140	142	144	146
June 22, 2085	April 10, 2089	January 27, 2093	November 15, 2096	September 4, 2100
148	150	152	154	156
June 22, 2104	April 11, 2108	January 29, 2112	November 16, 2115	September 5, 2119
158	160	162	164	
June 23, 2123			November 16, 2134	

=== Tritos series ===
This eclipse is a part of a tritos cycle, repeating at alternating nodes every 135 synodic months (≈ 3986.63 days, or 11 years minus 1 month). Their appearance and longitude are irregular due to a lack of synchronization with the anomalistic month (period of perigee), but groupings of 3 tritos cycles (≈ 33 years minus 3 months) come close (≈ 434.044 anomalistic months), so eclipses are similar in these groupings.

Series members between 1801 and 2200
March 4, 1802 (Saros 117)	February 1, 1813 (Saros 118)	January 1, 1824 (Saros 119)	November 30, 1834 (Saros 120)	October 30, 1845 (Saros 121)
September 29, 1856 (Saros 122)	August 29, 1867 (Saros 123)	July 29, 1878 (Saros 124)	June 28, 1889 (Saros 125)	May 28, 1900 (Saros 126)
April 28, 1911 (Saros 127)	March 28, 1922 (Saros 128)	February 24, 1933 (Saros 129)	January 25, 1944 (Saros 130)	December 25, 1954 (Saros 131)
November 23, 1965 (Saros 132)	October 23, 1976 (Saros 133)	September 23, 1987 (Saros 134)	August 22, 1998 (Saros 135)	July 22, 2009 (Saros 136)
June 21, 2020 (Saros 137)	May 21, 2031 (Saros 138)	April 20, 2042 (Saros 139)	March 20, 2053 (Saros 140)	February 17, 2064 (Saros 141)
January 16, 2075 (Saros 142)	December 16, 2085 (Saros 143)	November 15, 2096 (Saros 144)	October 16, 2107 (Saros 145)	September 15, 2118 (Saros 146)
August 15, 2129 (Saros 147)	July 14, 2140 (Saros 148)	June 14, 2151 (Saros 149)	May 14, 2162 (Saros 150)	April 12, 2173 (Saros 151)
March 12, 2184 (Saros 152)	February 10, 2195 (Saros 153)			

=== Inex series ===
This eclipse is a part of the long period inex cycle, repeating at alternating nodes, every 358 synodic months (≈ 10,571.95 days, or 29 years minus 20 days). Their appearance and longitude are irregular due to a lack of synchronization with the anomalistic month (period of perigee). However, groupings of 3 inex cycles (≈ 87 years minus 2 months) comes close (≈ 1,151.02 anomalistic months), so eclipses are similar in these groupings.

Series members between 1801 and 2200
June 6, 1807 (Saros 134)	May 15, 1836 (Saros 135)	April 25, 1865 (Saros 136)
April 6, 1894 (Saros 137)	March 17, 1923 (Saros 138)	February 25, 1952 (Saros 139)
February 4, 1981 (Saros 140)	January 15, 2010 (Saros 141)	December 26, 2038 (Saros 142)
December 6, 2067 (Saros 143)	November 15, 2096 (Saros 144)	October 26, 2125 (Saros 145)
October 7, 2154 (Saros 146)	September 16, 2183 (Saros 147)	
