= Solar eclipse of March 28, 1968 =

20th-century partial solar eclipse

- Partial eclipse
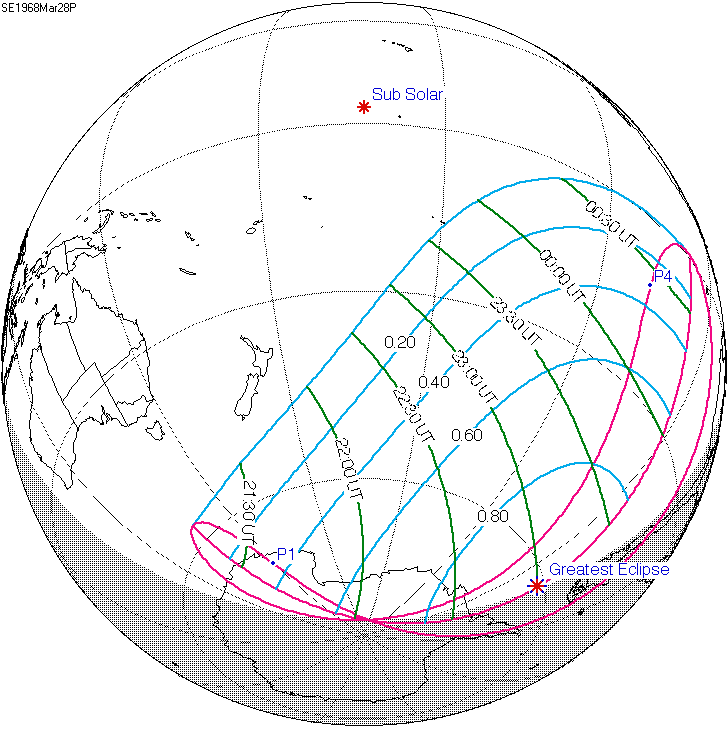
- Map
- Gamma: −1.037
- Magnitude: 0.899

Maximum eclipse
- Coordinates: 61°S 79.8°W

Times (UTC)
- Greatest eclipse: 23:00:30

References
- Saros: 119 (63 of 71)
- Catalog # (SE5000): 9438

A partial solar eclipse occurred at the Moon's ascending node of orbit between Thursday, March 28 and Friday, March 29, 1968, with a magnitude of 0.899. A solar eclipse occurs when the Moon passes between Earth and the Sun, thereby totally or partly obscuring the image of the Sun for a viewer on Earth. A partial solar eclipse occurs in the polar regions of the Earth when the center of the Moon's shadow misses the Earth.

A partial eclipse was visible for parts of eastern Oceania and Antarctica.

== Eclipse details ==
Shown below are two tables displaying details about this particular solar eclipse. The first table outlines times at which the Moon's penumbra or umbra attains the specific parameter, and the second table describes various other parameters pertaining to this eclipse.

March 28, 1968 Solar Eclipse Times
Event	Time (UTC)
First Penumbral External Contact	1968 March 28 at 20:44:13.8 UTC
Equatorial Conjunction	1968 March 28 at 21:53:55.7 UTC
Ecliptic Conjunction	1968 March 28 at 22:48:36.8 UTC
Greatest Eclipse	1968 March 28 at 23:00:30.4 UTC
Last Penumbral External Contact	1968 March 29 at 01:17:17.4 UTC

March 28, 1968 Solar Eclipse Parameters
Parameter	Value
Eclipse Magnitude	0.89902
Eclipse Obscuration	0.84205
Gamma	−1.03704
Sun Right Ascension	00h30m35.2s
Sun Declination	+03°18'09.3"
Sun Semi-Diameter	16'01.0"
Sun Equatorial Horizontal Parallax	08.8"
Moon Right Ascension	00h32m24.8s
Moon Declination	+02°28'24.8"
Moon Semi-Diameter	14'57.5"
Moon Equatorial Horizontal Parallax	0°54'53.9"
ΔT	38.5 s

== Eclipse season ==
This eclipse is part of an eclipse season, a period, roughly every six months, when eclipses occur. Only two (or occasionally three) eclipse seasons occur each year, and each season lasts about 35 days and repeats just short of six months (173 days) later; thus two full eclipse seasons always occur each year. Either two or three eclipses happen each eclipse season. In the sequence below, each eclipse is separated by a fortnight.

Eclipse season of March–April 1968
March 28 Ascending node (new moon)	April 13 Descending node (full moon)
Partial solar eclipse Solar Saros 119	Total lunar eclipse Lunar Saros 131

== Related eclipses ==
=== Eclipses in 1968 ===
- A partial solar eclipse on March 28.
- A total lunar eclipse on April 13.
- A total solar eclipse on September 22.
- A total lunar eclipse on October 6.

=== Metonic ===
- Preceded by: Solar eclipse of June 10, 1964
- Followed by: Solar eclipse of January 16, 1972

=== Tzolkinex ===
- Preceded by: Solar eclipse of February 15, 1961
- Followed by: Solar eclipse of May 11, 1975

=== Half-Saros ===
- Preceded by: Lunar eclipse of March 24, 1959
- Followed by: Lunar eclipse of April 4, 1977

=== Tritos ===
- Preceded by: Solar eclipse of April 30, 1957
- Followed by: Solar eclipse of February 26, 1979

=== Solar Saros 119 ===
- Preceded by: Solar eclipse of March 18, 1950
- Followed by: Solar eclipse of April 9, 1986

=== Inex ===
- Preceded by: Solar eclipse of April 19, 1939
- Followed by: Solar eclipse of March 9, 1997

=== Triad ===
- Preceded by: Solar eclipse of May 27, 1881
- Followed by: Solar eclipse of January 27, 2055

=== Solar eclipses of 1968–1971 ===
This eclipse is a member of a semester series. An eclipse in a semester series of solar eclipses repeats approximately every 177 days and 4 hours (a semester) at alternating nodes of the Moon's orbit.

The partial solar eclipse on July 22, 1971 occurs in the next lunar year eclipse set.

Solar eclipse series sets from 1968 to 1971
Ascending node			Descending node		
Saros	Map	Gamma	Saros	Map	Gamma
119	March 28, 1968 Partial	−1.037	124	September 22, 1968 Total	0.9451
129	March 18, 1969 Annular	−0.2704	134	September 11, 1969 Annular	0.2201
139 Totality in Williamston, NC; USA	March 7, 1970 Total	0.4473	144	August 31, 1970 Annular	−0.5364
149	February 25, 1971 Partial	1.1188	154	August 20, 1971 Partial	−1.2659

=== Saros 119 ===
This eclipse is a part of Saros series 119, repeating every 18 years, 11 days, and containing 71 events. The series started with a partial solar eclipse on May 15, 850 AD. It contains total eclipses on August 9, 994 AD and August 20, 1012; a hybrid eclipse on August 31, 1030; and annular eclipses from September 10, 1048 through March 18, 1950. The series ends at member 71 as a partial eclipse on June 24, 2112. Its eclipses are tabulated in three columns; every third eclipse in the same column is one exeligmos apart, so they all cast shadows over approximately the same parts of the Earth.

The longest duration of totality was produced by member 10 at 32 seconds on August 20, 1012, and the longest duration of annularity was produced by member 44 at 7 minutes, 37 seconds on September 1, 1625. All eclipses in this series occur at the Moon’s ascending node of orbit.

Series members 54–71 occur between 1801 and 2112:
54	55	56
December 21, 1805	January 1, 1824	January 11, 1842
57	58	59
January 23, 1860	February 2, 1878	February 13, 1896
60	61	62
February 25, 1914	March 7, 1932	March 18, 1950
63	64	65
March 28, 1968	April 9, 1986	April 19, 2004
66	67	68
April 30, 2022	May 11, 2040	May 22, 2058
69	70	71
June 1, 2076	June 13, 2094	June 24, 2112

=== Metonic series ===
The metonic series repeats eclipses every 19 years (6939.69 days), lasting about 5 cycles. Eclipses occur in nearly the same calendar date. In addition, the octon subseries repeats 1/5 of that or every 3.8 years (1387.94 days). All eclipses in this table occur at the Moon's ascending node.

20 eclipse events between June 10, 1964 and August 21, 2036
June 10–11	March 28–29	January 14–16	November 3	August 21–22
117	119	121	123	125
June 10, 1964	March 28, 1968	January 16, 1972	November 3, 1975	August 22, 1979
127	129	131	133	135
June 11, 1983	March 29, 1987	January 15, 1991	November 3, 1994	August 22, 1998
137	139	141	143	145
June 10, 2002	March 29, 2006	January 15, 2010	November 3, 2013	August 21, 2017
147	149	151	153	155
June 10, 2021	March 29, 2025	January 14, 2029	November 3, 2032	August 21, 2036

=== Tritos series ===
This eclipse is a part of a tritos cycle, repeating at alternating nodes every 135 synodic months (≈ 3986.63 days, or 11 years minus 1 month). Their appearance and longitude are irregular due to a lack of synchronization with the anomalistic month (period of perigee), but groupings of 3 tritos cycles (≈ 33 years minus 3 months) come close (≈ 434.044 anomalistic months), so eclipses are similar in these groupings.

Series members between 1837 and 2200
April 5, 1837 (Saros 107)	March 5, 1848 (Saros 108)	February 3, 1859 (Saros 109)		December 2, 1880 (Saros 111)
		August 31, 1913 (Saros 114)	July 31, 1924 (Saros 115)	June 30, 1935 (Saros 116)
May 30, 1946 (Saros 117)	April 30, 1957 (Saros 118)	March 28, 1968 (Saros 119)	February 26, 1979 (Saros 120)	January 26, 1990 (Saros 121)
December 25, 2000 (Saros 122)	November 25, 2011 (Saros 123)	October 25, 2022 (Saros 124)	September 23, 2033 (Saros 125)	August 23, 2044 (Saros 126)
July 24, 2055 (Saros 127)	June 22, 2066 (Saros 128)	May 22, 2077 (Saros 129)	April 21, 2088 (Saros 130)	March 21, 2099 (Saros 131)
February 18, 2110 (Saros 132)	January 19, 2121 (Saros 133)	December 19, 2131 (Saros 134)	November 17, 2142 (Saros 135)	October 17, 2153 (Saros 136)
September 16, 2164 (Saros 137)	August 16, 2175 (Saros 138)	July 16, 2186 (Saros 139)	June 15, 2197 (Saros 140)	

=== Inex series ===
This eclipse is a part of the long period inex cycle, repeating at alternating nodes, every 358 synodic months (≈ 10,571.95 days, or 29 years minus 20 days). Their appearance and longitude are irregular due to a lack of synchronization with the anomalistic month (period of perigee). However, groupings of 3 inex cycles (≈ 87 years minus 2 months) comes close (≈ 1,151.02 anomalistic months), so eclipses are similar in these groupings.

Series members between 1801 and 2200
July 8, 1823 (Saros 114)	June 17, 1852 (Saros 115)	May 27, 1881 (Saros 116)
May 9, 1910 (Saros 117)	April 19, 1939 (Saros 118)	March 28, 1968 (Saros 119)
March 9, 1997 (Saros 120)	February 17, 2026 (Saros 121)	January 27, 2055 (Saros 122)
January 7, 2084 (Saros 123)	December 19, 2112 (Saros 124)	November 28, 2141 (Saros 125)
November 8, 2170 (Saros 126)	October 19, 2199 (Saros 127)	
