= Solar eclipse of September 3, 2062 =

Future partial solar eclipse

- Partial eclipse
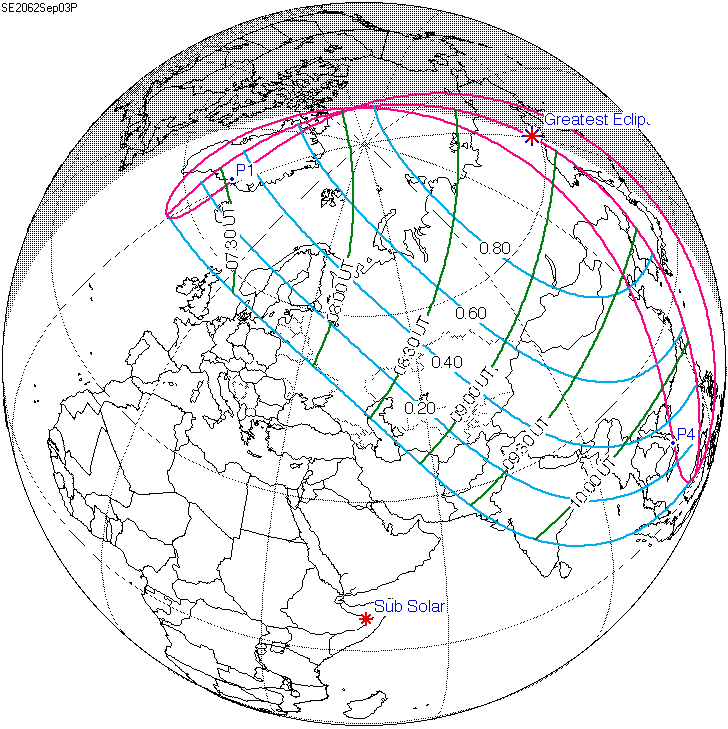
- Map
- Gamma: 1.0191
- Magnitude: 0.9749

Maximum eclipse
- Coordinates: 61.3°N 150.3°E

Times (UTC)
- Greatest eclipse: 8:54:27

References
- Saros: 126 (50 of 72)
- Catalog # (SE5000): 9647

A partial solar eclipse will occur at the Moon's descending node of orbit on Sunday, September 3, 2062, with a magnitude of 0.9749. A solar eclipse occurs when the Moon passes between Earth and the Sun, thereby totally or partly obscuring the image of the Sun for a viewer on Earth. A partial solar eclipse occurs in the polar regions of the Earth when the center of the Moon's shadow misses the Earth.

The partial solar eclipse will be visible for parts of Greenland, Northern Europe, and Asia.

== Eclipse details ==
Shown below are two tables displaying details about this particular solar eclipse. The first table outlines times at which the Moon's penumbra or umbra attains the specific parameter, and the second table describes various other parameters pertaining to this eclipse.

September 3, 2062 Solar Eclipse Times
Event	Time (UTC)
First Penumbral External Contact	2062 September 3 at 06:53:47.7 UTC
Equatorial Conjunction	2062 September 3 at 07:57:56.6 UTC
Ecliptic Conjunction	2062 September 3 at 08:44:07.4 UTC
Greatest Eclipse	2062 September 3 at 08:54:27.4 UTC
Last Penumbral External Contact	2062 September 3 at 10:55:33.6 UTC

September 3, 2062 Solar Eclipse Parameters
Parameter	Value
Eclipse Magnitude	0.97489
Eclipse Obscuration	0.97526
Gamma	1.01915
Sun Right Ascension	10h50m30.3s
Sun Declination	+07°22'28.5"
Sun Semi-Diameter	15'51.2"
Sun Equatorial Horizontal Parallax	08.7"
Moon Right Ascension	10h52m25.5s
Moon Declination	+08°16'29.0"
Moon Semi-Diameter	16'22.2"
Moon Equatorial Horizontal Parallax	1°00'04.6"
ΔT	92.2 s

== Eclipse season ==
This eclipse is part of an eclipse season, a period, roughly every six months, when eclipses occur. Only two (or occasionally three) eclipse seasons occur each year, and each season lasts about 35 days and repeats just short of six months (173 days) later; thus two full eclipse seasons always occur each year. Either two or three eclipses happen each eclipse season. In the sequence below, each eclipse is separated by a fortnight.

Eclipse season of September 2062
September 3 Descending node (new moon)	September 18 Ascending node (full moon)
Partial solar eclipse Solar Saros 126	Total lunar eclipse Lunar Saros 138

== Related eclipses ==
=== Eclipses in 2062 ===
- A partial solar eclipse on March 11.
- A total lunar eclipse on March 25.
- A partial solar eclipse on September 3.
- A total lunar eclipse on September 18.

=== Metonic ===
- Preceded by: Solar eclipse of November 16, 2058
- Followed by: Solar eclipse of June 22, 2066

=== Tzolkinex ===
- Preceded by: Solar eclipse of July 24, 2055
- Followed by: Solar eclipse of October 15, 2069

=== Half-Saros ===
- Preceded by: Lunar eclipse of August 29, 2053
- Followed by: Lunar eclipse of September 9, 2071

=== Tritos ===
- Preceded by: Solar eclipse of October 4, 2051
- Followed by: Solar eclipse of August 3, 2073

=== Solar Saros 126 ===
- Preceded by: Solar eclipse of August 23, 2044
- Followed by: Solar eclipse of September 13, 2080

=== Inex ===
- Preceded by: Solar eclipse of September 23, 2033
- Followed by: Solar eclipse of August 15, 2091

=== Triad ===
- Preceded by: Solar eclipse of November 3, 1975
- Followed by: Solar eclipse of July 5, 2149

=== Solar eclipses of 2062–2065 ===
This eclipse is a member of a semester series. An eclipse in a semester series of solar eclipses repeats approximately every 177 days and 4 hours (a semester) at alternating nodes of the Moon's orbit.

The partial solar eclipses on July 3, 2065 and December 27, 2065 occur in the next lunar year eclipse set.

Solar eclipse series sets from 2062 to 2065
Ascending node			Descending node		
Saros	Map	Gamma	Saros	Map	Gamma
121	March 11, 2062 Partial	−1.0238	126	September 3, 2062 Partial	1.0191
131	February 28, 2063 Annular	−0.336	136	August 24, 2063 Total	0.2771
141	February 17, 2064 Annular	0.3597	146	August 12, 2064 Total	−0.4652
151	February 5, 2065 Partial	1.0336	156	August 2, 2065 Partial	−1.2759

=== Saros 126 ===
This eclipse is a part of Saros series 126, repeating every 18 years, 11 days, and containing 72 events. The series started with a partial solar eclipse on March 10, 1179. It contains annular eclipses from June 4, 1323 through April 4, 1810; hybrid eclipses from April 14, 1828 through May 6, 1864; and total eclipses from May 17, 1882 through August 23, 2044. The series ends at member 72 as a partial eclipse on May 3, 2459. Its eclipses are tabulated in three columns; every third eclipse in the same column is one exeligmos apart, so they all cast shadows over approximately the same parts of the Earth.

The longest duration of annularity was produced by member 11 at 6 minutes, 30 seconds on June 26, 1359, and the longest duration of totality was produced by member 45 at 2 minutes, 36 seconds on July 10, 1972. All eclipses in this series occur at the Moon’s descending node of orbit.

Series members 36–57 occur between 1801 and 2200:
36	37	38
April 4, 1810	April 14, 1828	April 25, 1846
39	40	41
May 6, 1864	May 17, 1882	May 28, 1900
42	43	44
June 8, 1918	June 19, 1936	June 30, 1954
45	46	47
July 10, 1972	July 22, 1990	August 1, 2008
48	49	50
August 12, 2026	August 23, 2044	September 3, 2062
51	52	53
September 13, 2080	September 25, 2098	October 6, 2116
54	55	56
October 17, 2134	October 28, 2152	November 8, 2170
57
November 18, 2188

=== Metonic series ===
The metonic series repeats eclipses every 19 years (6939.69 days), lasting about 5 cycles. Eclipses occur in nearly the same calendar date. In addition, the octon subseries repeats 1/5 of that or every 3.8 years (1387.94 days). All eclipses in this table occur at the Moon's descending node.

22 eclipse events between June 23, 2047 and November 16, 2134
June 22–23	April 10–11	January 27–29	November 15–16	September 3–5
118	120	122	124	126
June 23, 2047	April 11, 2051	January 27, 2055	November 16, 2058	September 3, 2062
128	130	132	134	136
June 22, 2066	April 11, 2070	January 27, 2074	November 15, 2077	September 3, 2081
138	140	142	144	146
June 22, 2085	April 10, 2089	January 27, 2093	November 15, 2096	September 4, 2100
148	150	152	154	156
June 22, 2104	April 11, 2108	January 29, 2112	November 16, 2115	September 5, 2119
158	160	162	164	
June 23, 2123			November 16, 2134	

=== Tritos series ===
This eclipse is a part of a tritos cycle, repeating at alternating nodes every 135 synodic months (≈ 3986.63 days, or 11 years minus 1 month). Their appearance and longitude are irregular due to a lack of synchronization with the anomalistic month (period of perigee), but groupings of 3 tritos cycles (≈ 33 years minus 3 months) come close (≈ 434.044 anomalistic months), so eclipses are similar in these groupings.

Series members between 1866 and 2200
March 16, 1866 (Saros 108)			December 13, 1898 (Saros 111)	
	September 12, 1931 (Saros 114)	August 12, 1942 (Saros 115)	July 11, 1953 (Saros 116)	June 10, 1964 (Saros 117)
May 11, 1975 (Saros 118)	April 9, 1986 (Saros 119)	March 9, 1997 (Saros 120)	February 7, 2008 (Saros 121)	January 6, 2019 (Saros 122)
December 5, 2029 (Saros 123)	November 4, 2040 (Saros 124)	October 4, 2051 (Saros 125)	September 3, 2062 (Saros 126)	August 3, 2073 (Saros 127)
July 3, 2084 (Saros 128)	June 2, 2095 (Saros 129)	May 3, 2106 (Saros 130)	April 2, 2117 (Saros 131)	March 1, 2128 (Saros 132)
January 30, 2139 (Saros 133)	December 30, 2149 (Saros 134)	November 27, 2160 (Saros 135)	October 29, 2171 (Saros 136)	September 27, 2182 (Saros 137)
August 26, 2193 (Saros 138)

=== Inex series ===
This eclipse is a part of the long period inex cycle, repeating at alternating nodes, every 358 synodic months (≈ 10,571.95 days, or 29 years minus 20 days). Their appearance and longitude are irregular due to a lack of synchronization with the anomalistic month (period of perigee). However, groupings of 3 inex cycles (≈ 87 years minus 2 months) comes close (≈ 1,151.02 anomalistic months), so eclipses are similar in these groupings.

Series members between 1801 and 2200
March 4, 1802 (Saros 117)	February 12, 1831 (Saros 118)	January 23, 1860 (Saros 119)
January 1, 1889 (Saros 120)	December 14, 1917 (Saros 121)	November 23, 1946 (Saros 122)
November 3, 1975 (Saros 123)	October 14, 2004 (Saros 124)	September 23, 2033 (Saros 125)
September 3, 2062 (Saros 126)	August 15, 2091 (Saros 127)	July 25, 2120 (Saros 128)
July 5, 2149 (Saros 129)	June 16, 2178 (Saros 130)	
