= Solar eclipse of April 11, 2070 =

Total eclipse

- Total eclipse
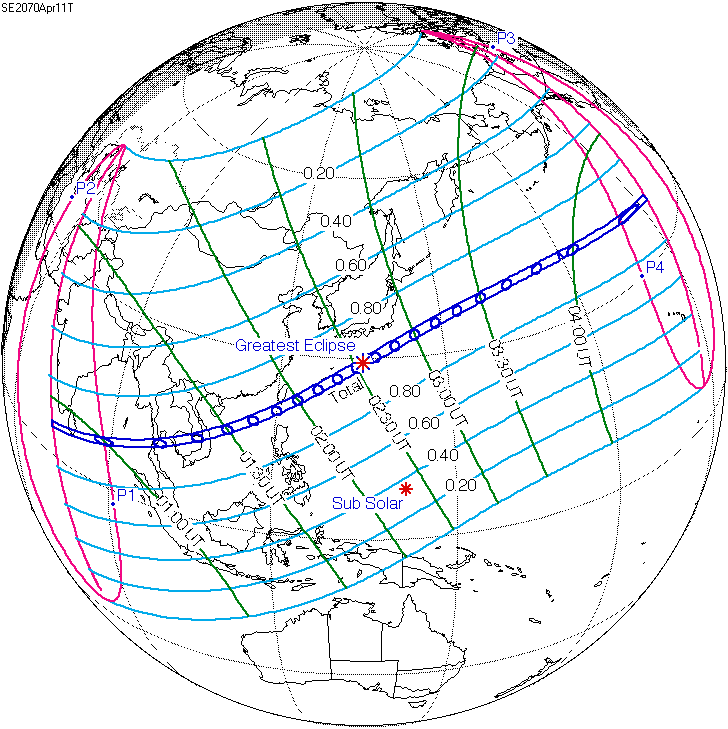
- Map
- Gamma: 0.3652
- Magnitude: 1.0472

Maximum eclipse
- Duration: 244 s (4 min 4 s)
- Coordinates: 29.1°N 135.1°E
- Max. width of band: 168 km (104 mi)

Times (UTC)
- Greatest eclipse: 2:36:09

References
- Saros: 130 (55 of 73)
- Catalog # (SE5000): 9665

A total solar eclipse will occur at the Moon's descending node of orbit between Thursday, April 10 and Friday, April 11, 2070, with a magnitude of 1.0472. A solar eclipse occurs when the Moon passes between Earth and the Sun, thereby totally or partly obscuring the image of the Sun for a viewer on Earth. A total solar eclipse occurs when the Moon's apparent diameter is larger than the Sun's, blocking all direct sunlight, turning day into darkness. Totality occurs in a narrow path across Earth's surface, with the partial solar eclipse visible over a surrounding region thousands of kilometres wide. Occurring about 1.6 days before perigee (on April 12, 2070, at 17:50 UTC), the Moon's apparent diameter will be larger.

The path of totality will be visible from parts of Sri Lanka, the Andaman and Nicobar Islands, Myanmar, Thailand, Cambodia, Laos, Vietnam, Yongxing Island, the southern tip of Taiwan, and the Nanpō Islands. A partial solar eclipse will also be visible for most of Asia and parts of Alaska, Hawaii, and western Canada.

== Eclipse details ==
Shown below are two tables displaying details about this particular solar eclipse. The first table outlines times at which the Moon's penumbra or umbra attains the specific parameter, and the second table describes various other parameters pertaining to this eclipse.

April 11, 2070 Solar Eclipse Times
Event	Time (UTC)
First Penumbral External Contact	2070 April 10 at 23:59:46.0 UTC
First Umbral External Contact	2070 April 11 at 00:57:51.3 UTC
First Central Line	2070 April 11 at 00:58:44.4 UTC
First Umbral Internal Contact	2070 April 11 at 00:59:37.6 UTC
First Penumbral Internal Contact	2070 April 11 at 02:06:46.7 UTC
Ecliptic Conjunction	2070 April 11 at 02:32:21.8 UTC
Greatest Eclipse	2070 April 11 at 02:36:09.4 UTC
Greatest Duration	2070 April 11 at 02:39:03.0 UTC
Equatorial Conjunction	2070 April 11 at 02:47:19.1 UTC
Last Penumbral Internal Contact	2070 April 11 at 03:05:15.2 UTC
Last Umbral Internal Contact	2070 April 11 at 04:12:30.9 UTC
Last Central Line	2070 April 11 at 04:13:25.9 UTC
Last Umbral External Contact	2070 April 11 at 04:14:20.9 UTC
Last Penumbral External Contact	2070 April 11 at 05:12:23.7 UTC

April 11, 2070 Solar Eclipse Parameters
Parameter	Value
Eclipse Magnitude	1.04715
Eclipse Obscuration	1.09653
Gamma	0.36524
Sun Right Ascension	01h19m45.0s
Sun Declination	+08°24'18.3"
Sun Semi-Diameter	15'57.8"
Sun Equatorial Horizontal Parallax	08.8"
Moon Right Ascension	01h19m20.0s
Moon Declination	+08°45'25.6"
Moon Semi-Diameter	16'27.4"
Moon Equatorial Horizontal Parallax	1°00'23.9"
ΔT	97.7 s

== Eclipse season ==
This eclipse is part of an eclipse season, a period, roughly every six months, when eclipses occur. Only two (or occasionally three) eclipse seasons occur each year, and each season lasts about 35 days and repeats just short of six months (173 days) later; thus two full eclipse seasons always occur each year. Either two or three eclipses happen each eclipse season. In the sequence below, each eclipse is separated by a fortnight.

Eclipse season of April 2070
April 11 Descending node (new moon)	April 25 Ascending node (full moon)
Total solar eclipse Solar Saros 130	Penumbral lunar eclipse Lunar Saros 142

== Related eclipses ==
=== Eclipses in 2070 ===
- A total solar eclipse on April 11.
- A penumbral lunar eclipse on April 25.
- An annular solar eclipse on October 4.
- A partial lunar eclipse on October 19.

=== Metonic ===
- Preceded by: Solar eclipse of June 22, 2066
- Followed by: Solar eclipse of January 27, 2074

=== Tzolkinex ===
- Preceded by: Solar eclipse of February 28, 2063
- Followed by: Solar eclipse of May 22, 2077

=== Half-Saros ===
- Preceded by: Lunar eclipse of April 4, 2061
- Followed by: Lunar eclipse of April 16, 2079

=== Tritos ===
- Preceded by: Solar eclipse of May 11, 2059
- Followed by: Solar eclipse of March 10, 2081

=== Solar Saros 130 ===
- Preceded by: Solar eclipse of March 30, 2052
- Followed by: Solar eclipse of April 21, 2088

=== Inex ===
- Preceded by: Solar eclipse of April 30, 2041
- Followed by: Solar eclipse of March 21, 2099

=== Triad ===
- Preceded by: Solar eclipse of June 11, 1983
- Followed by: Solar eclipse of February 9, 2157

=== Solar eclipses of 2069–2072 ===
This eclipse is a member of a semester series. An eclipse in a semester series of solar eclipses repeats approximately every 177 days and 4 hours (a semester) at alternating nodes of the Moon's orbit.

The partial solar eclipse on May 20, 2069 occurs in the previous lunar year eclipse set.

Solar eclipse series sets from 2069 to 2072
Descending node			Ascending node		
Saros	Map	Gamma	Saros	Map	Gamma
120	April 21, 2069 Partial	1.0624	125	October 15, 2069 Partial	−1.2524
130	April 11, 2070 Total	0.3652	135	October 4, 2070 Annular	−0.495
140	March 31, 2071 Annular	−0.3739	145	September 23, 2071 Total	0.262
150	March 19, 2072 Partial	−1.1405	155	September 12, 2072 Total	0.9655

=== Saros 130 ===
This eclipse is a part of Saros series 130, repeating every 18 years, 11 days, and containing 73 events. The series started with a partial solar eclipse on August 20, 1096. It contains total eclipses from April 5, 1475 through July 18, 2232. There are no annular or hybrid eclipses in this set. The series ends at member 73 as a partial eclipse on October 25, 2394. Its eclipses are tabulated in three columns; every third eclipse in the same column is one exeligmos apart, so they all cast shadows over approximately the same parts of the Earth.

The longest duration of totality was produced by member 30 at 6 minutes, 41 seconds on July 11, 1619. All eclipses in this series occur at the Moon’s descending node of orbit.

Series members 41–62 occur between 1801 and 2200:
41	42	43
November 9, 1817	November 20, 1835	November 30, 1853
44	45	46
December 12, 1871	December 22, 1889	January 3, 1908
47	48	49
January 14, 1926	January 25, 1944	February 5, 1962
50	51	52
February 16, 1980	February 26, 1998	March 9, 2016
53	54	55
March 20, 2034	March 30, 2052	April 11, 2070
56	57	58
April 21, 2088	May 3, 2106	May 14, 2124
59	60	61
May 25, 2142	June 4, 2160	June 16, 2178
62
June 26, 2196

=== Metonic series ===
The metonic series repeats eclipses every 19 years (6939.69 days), lasting about 5 cycles. Eclipses occur in nearly the same calendar date. In addition, the octon subseries repeats 1/5 of that or every 3.8 years (1387.94 days). All eclipses in this table occur at the Moon's descending node.

22 eclipse events between June 23, 2047 and November 16, 2134
June 22–23	April 10–11	January 27–29	November 15–16	September 3–5
118	120	122	124	126
June 23, 2047	April 11, 2051	January 27, 2055	November 16, 2058	September 3, 2062
128	130	132	134	136
June 22, 2066	April 11, 2070	January 27, 2074	November 15, 2077	September 3, 2081
138	140	142	144	146
June 22, 2085	April 10, 2089	January 27, 2093	November 15, 2096	September 4, 2100
148	150	152	154	156
June 22, 2104	April 11, 2108	January 29, 2112	November 16, 2115	September 5, 2119
158	160	162	164	
June 23, 2123			November 16, 2134	

=== Tritos series ===
This eclipse is a part of a tritos cycle, repeating at alternating nodes every 135 synodic months (≈ 3986.63 days, or 11 years minus 1 month). Their appearance and longitude are irregular due to a lack of synchronization with the anomalistic month (period of perigee), but groupings of 3 tritos cycles (≈ 33 years minus 3 months) come close (≈ 434.044 anomalistic months), so eclipses are similar in these groupings.

Series members between 1801 and 2200
March 25, 1819 (Saros 107)	February 23, 1830 (Saros 108)	January 22, 1841 (Saros 109)		November 21, 1862 (Saros 111)
		August 20, 1895 (Saros 114)	July 21, 1906 (Saros 115)	June 19, 1917 (Saros 116)
May 19, 1928 (Saros 117)	April 19, 1939 (Saros 118)	March 18, 1950 (Saros 119)	February 15, 1961 (Saros 120)	January 16, 1972 (Saros 121)
December 15, 1982 (Saros 122)	November 13, 1993 (Saros 123)	October 14, 2004 (Saros 124)	September 13, 2015 (Saros 125)	August 12, 2026 (Saros 126)
July 13, 2037 (Saros 127)	June 11, 2048 (Saros 128)	May 11, 2059 (Saros 129)	April 11, 2070 (Saros 130)	March 10, 2081 (Saros 131)
February 7, 2092 (Saros 132)	January 8, 2103 (Saros 133)	December 8, 2113 (Saros 134)	November 6, 2124 (Saros 135)	October 7, 2135 (Saros 136)
September 6, 2146 (Saros 137)	August 5, 2157 (Saros 138)	July 5, 2168 (Saros 139)	June 5, 2179 (Saros 140)	May 4, 2190 (Saros 141)

=== Inex series ===
This eclipse is a part of the long period inex cycle, repeating at alternating nodes, every 358 synodic months (≈ 10,571.95 days, or 29 years minus 20 days). Their appearance and longitude are irregular due to a lack of synchronization with the anomalistic month (period of perigee). However, groupings of 3 inex cycles (≈ 87 years minus 2 months) comes close (≈ 1,151.02 anomalistic months), so eclipses are similar in these groupings.

Series members between 1801 and 2200
October 9, 1809 (Saros 121)	September 18, 1838 (Saros 122)	August 29, 1867 (Saros 123)
August 9, 1896 (Saros 124)	July 20, 1925 (Saros 125)	June 30, 1954 (Saros 126)
June 11, 1983 (Saros 127)	May 20, 2012 (Saros 128)	April 30, 2041 (Saros 129)
April 11, 2070 (Saros 130)	March 21, 2099 (Saros 131)	March 1, 2128 (Saros 132)
February 9, 2157 (Saros 133)	January 20, 2186 (Saros 134)	
