= Solar eclipse of May 17, 1882 =

Total eclipse

- Total eclipse
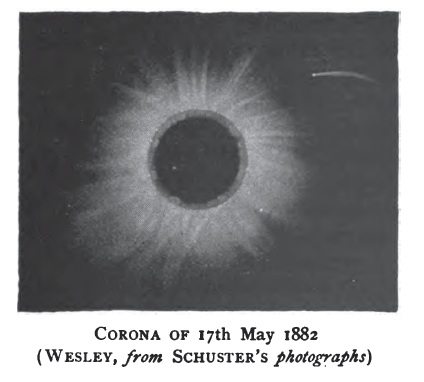

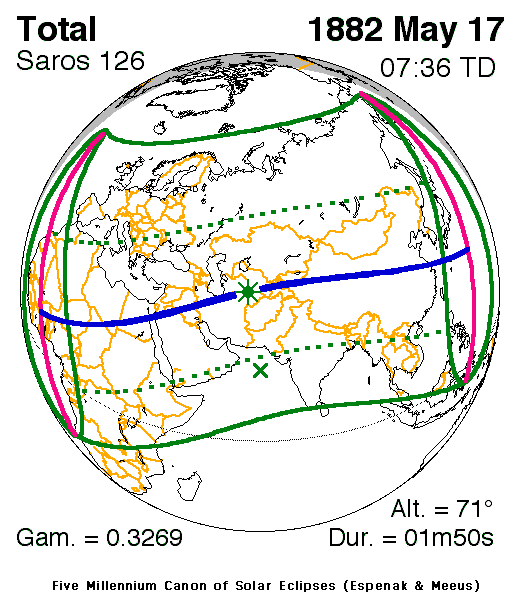
- Map
- Gamma: 0.3269
- Magnitude: 1.02

Maximum eclipse
- Duration: 110 s (1 min 50 s)
- Coordinates: 38.4°N 61.6°E
- Max. width of band: 72 km (45 mi)

Times (UTC)
- Greatest eclipse: 7:36:27

References
- Saros: 126 (40 of 72)
- Catalog # (SE5000): 9239

A total solar eclipse occurred at the Moon's descending node of orbit on Wednesday, May 17, 1882, with a magnitude of 1.0200. A solar eclipse occurs when the Moon passes between Earth and the Sun, thereby totally or partly obscuring the image of the Sun for a viewer on Earth. A total solar eclipse occurs when the Moon's apparent diameter is larger than the Sun's, blocking all direct sunlight, turning day into darkness. Totality occurs in a narrow path across Earth's surface, with the partial solar eclipse visible over a surrounding region thousands of kilometres wide. Occurring about 4.2 days after perigee (on May 13, 1882, at 2:45 UTC), the Moon's apparent diameter was larger.

The path of totality was visible from parts of modern-day Burkina Faso, Ghana, Niger, Nigeria, Chad, Libya, Egypt, Saudi Arabia, Iraq, Iran, Turkmenistan, Uzbekistan, Tajikistan, Kyrgyzstan, and China. A partial solar eclipse was also visible for parts of Africa, Europe, and Asia.

== Observations ==
A party of observers gathered in Egypt to watch the eclipse were greatly surprised when they observed a bright streak near to the Sun once totality began. By a remarkable coincidence, the eclipse had coincided with the perihelion passage of a Kreutz comet. The comet would otherwise have gone unnoticed—its sighting during the eclipse was the only observation of it. Photographs of the eclipse revealed that the comet had moved noticeably during the 1m50s eclipse, as would be expected for a comet racing past the Sun at almost 500 km/s. The comet is sometimes referred to as Tewfik, after Tewfik Pasha, the Khedive of Egypt at the time.

== Eclipse details ==
Shown below are two tables displaying details about this particular solar eclipse. The first table outlines times at which the Moon's penumbra or umbra attains the specific parameter, and the second table describes various other parameters pertaining to this eclipse.

May 17, 1882 Solar Eclipse Times
Event	Time (UTC)
First Penumbral External Contact	1882 May 17 at 04:52:19.5 UTC
First Umbral External Contact	1882 May 17 at 05:53:35.0 UTC
First Central Line	1882 May 17 at 05:53:43.6 UTC
First Umbral Internal Contact	1882 May 17 at 05:53:52.2 UTC
First Penumbral Internal Contact	1882 May 17 at 07:02:13.9 UTC
Ecliptic Conjunction	1882 May 17 at 07:32:55.8 UTC
Greatest Duration	1882 May 17 at 07:35:20.9 UTC
Greatest Eclipse	1882 May 17 at 07:36:26.9 UTC
Equatorial Conjunction	1882 May 17 at 07:41:22.6 UTC
Last Penumbral Internal Contact	1882 May 17 at 08:10:31.0 UTC
Last Umbral Internal Contact	1882 May 17 at 09:19:01.4 UTC
Last Central Line	1882 May 17 at 09:19:07.3 UTC
Last Umbral External Contact	1882 May 17 at 09:19:13.2 UTC
Last Penumbral External Contact	1882 May 17 at 10:20:37.9 UTC

May 17, 1882 Solar Eclipse Parameters
Parameter	Value
Eclipse Magnitude	1.02000
Eclipse Obscuration	1.04040
Gamma	0.32688
Sun Right Ascension	03h35m45.9s
Sun Declination	+19°19'37.1"
Sun Semi-Diameter	15'48.5"
Sun Equatorial Horizontal Parallax	08.7"
Moon Right Ascension	03h35m34.8s
Moon Declination	+19°38'26.3"
Moon Semi-Diameter	15'52.7"
Moon Equatorial Horizontal Parallax	0°58'16.5"
ΔT	-5.5 s

== Eclipse season ==
This eclipse is part of an eclipse season, a period, roughly every six months, when eclipses occur. Only two (or occasionally three) eclipse seasons occur each year, and each season lasts about 35 days and repeats just short of six months (173 days) later; thus two full eclipse seasons always occur each year. Either two or three eclipses happen each eclipse season. In the sequence below, each eclipse is separated by a fortnight.

Eclipse season of May–June 1882
May 17 Descending node (new moon)	June 1 Ascending node (full moon)
Total solar eclipse Solar Saros 126	Penumbral lunar eclipse Lunar Saros 138

== Related eclipses ==
=== Eclipses in 1882 ===
- A total solar eclipse on May 17.
- A penumbral lunar eclipse on June 1.
- An annular solar eclipse on November 10.
- A penumbral lunar eclipse on November 25.

=== Metonic ===
- Preceded by: Solar eclipse of July 29, 1878
- Followed by: Solar eclipse of March 5, 1886

=== Tzolkinex ===
- Preceded by: Solar eclipse of April 6, 1875
- Followed by: Solar eclipse of June 28, 1889

=== Half-Saros ===
- Preceded by: Lunar eclipse of May 12, 1873
- Followed by: Lunar eclipse of May 23, 1891

=== Tritos ===
- Preceded by: Solar eclipse of June 18, 1871
- Followed by: Solar eclipse of April 16, 1893

=== Solar Saros 126 ===
- Preceded by: Solar eclipse of May 6, 1864
- Followed by: Solar eclipse of May 28, 1900

=== Inex ===
- Preceded by: Solar eclipse of June 6, 1853
- Followed by: Solar eclipse of April 28, 1911

=== Triad ===
- Preceded by: Solar eclipse of July 16, 1795
- Followed by: Solar eclipse of March 18, 1969

=== Solar eclipses of 1880–1884 ===
This eclipse is a member of a semester series. An eclipse in a semester series of solar eclipses repeats approximately every 177 days and 4 hours (a semester) at alternating nodes of the Moon's orbit.

The solar eclipses on January 11, 1880 (total), July 7, 1880 (annular), and December 31, 1880 (partial) occur in the previous lunar year eclipse set, and the partial solar eclipse on March 27, 1884 occurs in the next lunar year eclipse set.

Solar eclipse series sets from 1880 to 1884
Ascending node			Descending node		
Saros	Map	Gamma	Saros	Map	Gamma
111	December 2, 1880 Partial	−1.5172	116	May 27, 1881 Partial	1.1345
121	November 21, 1881 Annular	−0.8931	126	May 17, 1882 Total	0.3269
131	November 10, 1882 Annular	−0.2056	136	May 6, 1883 Total	−0.4250
141	October 30, 1883 Annular	0.5030	146	April 25, 1884 Partial	−1.1365
151	October 19, 1884 Partial	1.1892			

=== Saros 126 ===
This eclipse is a part of Saros series 126, repeating every 18 years, 11 days, and containing 72 events. The series started with a partial solar eclipse on March 10, 1179. It contains annular eclipses from June 4, 1323 through April 4, 1810; hybrid eclipses from April 14, 1828 through May 6, 1864; and total eclipses from May 17, 1882 through August 23, 2044. The series ends at member 72 as a partial eclipse on May 3, 2459. Its eclipses are tabulated in three columns; every third eclipse in the same column is one exeligmos apart, so they all cast shadows over approximately the same parts of the Earth.

The longest duration of annularity was produced by member 11 at 6 minutes, 30 seconds on June 26, 1359, and the longest duration of totality was produced by member 45 at 2 minutes, 36 seconds on July 10, 1972. All eclipses in this series occur at the Moon’s descending node of orbit.

Series members 36–57 occur between 1801 and 2200:
36	37	38
April 4, 1810	April 14, 1828	April 25, 1846
39	40	41
May 6, 1864	May 17, 1882	May 28, 1900
42	43	44
June 8, 1918	June 19, 1936	June 30, 1954
45	46	47
July 10, 1972	July 22, 1990	August 1, 2008
48	49	50
August 12, 2026	August 23, 2044	September 3, 2062
51	52	53
September 13, 2080	September 25, 2098	October 6, 2116
54	55	56
October 17, 2134	October 28, 2152	November 8, 2170
57
November 18, 2188

=== Metonic series ===
The metonic series repeats eclipses every 19 years (6939.69 days), lasting about 5 cycles. Eclipses occur in nearly the same calendar date. In addition, the octon subseries repeats 1/5 of that or every 3.8 years (1387.94 days). All eclipses in this table occur at the Moon's descending node.

22 eclipse events between March 5, 1848 and July 30, 1935
March 5–6	December 22–24	October 9–11	July 29–30	May 17–18
108	110	112	114	116
March 5, 1848			July 29, 1859	May 17, 1863
118	120	122	124	126
March 6, 1867	December 22, 1870	October 10, 1874	July 29, 1878	May 17, 1882
128	130	132	134	136
March 5, 1886	December 22, 1889	October 9, 1893	July 29, 1897	May 18, 1901
138	140	142	144	146
March 6, 1905	December 23, 1908	October 10, 1912	July 30, 1916	May 18, 1920
148	150	152	154	
March 5, 1924	December 24, 1927	October 11, 1931	July 30, 1935	

=== Tritos series ===
This eclipse is a part of a tritos cycle, repeating at alternating nodes every 135 synodic months (≈ 3986.63 days, or 11 years minus 1 month). Their appearance and longitude are irregular due to a lack of synchronization with the anomalistic month (period of perigee), but groupings of 3 tritos cycles (≈ 33 years minus 3 months) come close (≈ 434.044 anomalistic months), so eclipses are similar in these groupings.

Series members between 1801 and 2200
December 21, 1805 (Saros 119)	November 19, 1816 (Saros 120)	October 20, 1827 (Saros 121)	September 18, 1838 (Saros 122)	August 18, 1849 (Saros 123)
July 18, 1860 (Saros 124)	June 18, 1871 (Saros 125)	May 17, 1882 (Saros 126)	April 16, 1893 (Saros 127)	March 17, 1904 (Saros 128)
February 14, 1915 (Saros 129)	January 14, 1926 (Saros 130)	December 13, 1936 (Saros 131)	November 12, 1947 (Saros 132)	October 12, 1958 (Saros 133)
September 11, 1969 (Saros 134)	August 10, 1980 (Saros 135)	July 11, 1991 (Saros 136)	June 10, 2002 (Saros 137)	May 10, 2013 (Saros 138)
April 8, 2024 (Saros 139)	March 9, 2035 (Saros 140)	February 5, 2046 (Saros 141)	January 5, 2057 (Saros 142)	December 6, 2067 (Saros 143)
November 4, 2078 (Saros 144)	October 4, 2089 (Saros 145)	September 4, 2100 (Saros 146)	August 4, 2111 (Saros 147)	July 4, 2122 (Saros 148)
June 3, 2133 (Saros 149)	May 3, 2144 (Saros 150)	April 2, 2155 (Saros 151)	March 2, 2166 (Saros 152)	January 29, 2177 (Saros 153)
December 29, 2187 (Saros 154)	November 28, 2198 (Saros 155)			

=== Inex series ===
This eclipse is a part of the long period inex cycle, repeating at alternating nodes, every 358 synodic months (≈ 10,571.95 days, or 29 years minus 20 days). Their appearance and longitude are irregular due to a lack of synchronization with the anomalistic month (period of perigee). However, groupings of 3 inex cycles (≈ 87 years minus 2 months) comes close (≈ 1,151.02 anomalistic months), so eclipses are similar in these groupings.

Series members between 1801 and 2200
June 26, 1824 (Saros 124)	June 6, 1853 (Saros 125)	May 17, 1882 (Saros 126)
April 28, 1911 (Saros 127)	April 7, 1940 (Saros 128)	March 18, 1969 (Saros 129)
February 26, 1998 (Saros 130)	February 6, 2027 (Saros 131)	January 16, 2056 (Saros 132)
December 27, 2084 (Saros 133)	December 8, 2113 (Saros 134)	November 17, 2142 (Saros 135)
October 29, 2171 (Saros 136)	October 9, 2200 (Saros 137)	
