= Solar eclipse of February 25, 1914 =

20th-century annular solar eclipse

- Annular eclipse
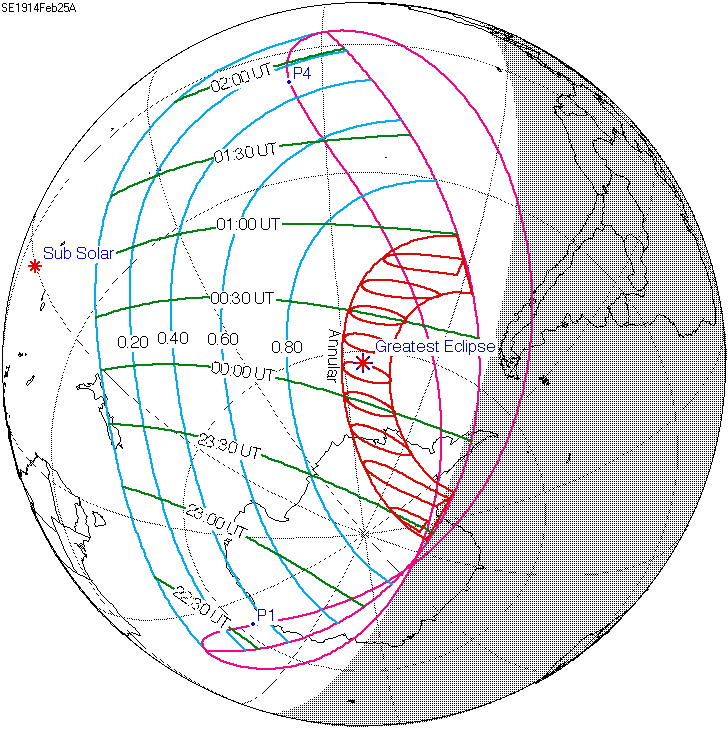
- Map
- Gamma: −0.9416
- Magnitude: 0.9248

Maximum eclipse
- Duration: 335 s (5 min 35 s)
- Coordinates: 62.1°S 113.3°W
- Max. width of band: 839 km (521 mi)

Times (UTC)
- Greatest eclipse: 0:13:01

References
- Saros: 119 (60 of 71)
- Catalog # (SE5000): 9313

An annular solar eclipse occurred at the Moon's ascending node of orbit between Tuesday, February 24 and Wednesday, February 25, 1914, with a magnitude of 0.9248. A solar eclipse occurs when the Moon passes between Earth and the Sun, thereby totally or partly obscuring the image of the Sun for a viewer on Earth. An annular solar eclipse occurs when the Moon's apparent diameter is smaller than the Sun's, blocking most of the Sun's light and causing the Sun to look like an annulus (ring). An annular eclipse appears as a partial eclipse over a region of the Earth thousands of kilometres wide. Occurring about 3.3 days before apogee (on February 28, 1914, at 9:10 UTC), the Moon's apparent diameter was smaller.

It took place almost entirely over the Southern Ocean, near Antarctica; at its widest, the shadow cast by the moon was 167 mi (269 km) wide. As a result, it could be seen from small patches of land, most notably southern Patagonia and part of New Zealand. Due to this limited visibility, the Star-Gazette of Elmira said that for readers in the United States it was "not particularly interesting from a popular perspective"; the Salina Daily Union in Salina, Kansas said that "you perhaps didn't notice it". It was the first of four eclipses that occurred during the year 1914. While its path passed over New Zealand, and some attempted to view it in Wellington, it was reported to not have been visible there due to cloud cover.

== Eclipse details ==
Shown below are two tables displaying details about this particular solar eclipse. The first table outlines times at which the Moon's penumbra or umbra attains the specific parameter, and the second table describes various other parameters pertaining to this eclipse.

February 25, 1914 Solar Eclipse Times
Event	Time (UTC)
First Penumbral External Contact	1914 February 24 at 21:45:44.8 UTC
First Umbral External Contact	1914 February 24 at 23:26:46.2 UTC
First Central Line	1914 February 24 at 23:34:33.5 UTC
First Umbral Internal Contact	1914 February 24 at 23:44:06.5 UTC
Equatorial Conjunction	1914 February 24 at 23:16:07.3 UTC
Ecliptic Conjunction	1914 February 25 at 00:02:02.3 UTC
Greatest Eclipse	1914 February 25 at 00:13:01.0 UTC
Greatest Duration	1914 February 25 at 00:13:07.8 UTC
Last Umbral Internal Contact	1914 February 25 at 00:42:30.0 UTC
Last Central Line	1914 February 25 at 00:52:04.0 UTC
Last Umbral External Contact	1914 February 25 at 00:59:52.3 UTC
Last Penumbral External Contact	1914 February 25 at 02:40:43.4 UTC

February 25, 1914 Solar Eclipse Parameters
Parameter	Value
Eclipse Magnitude	0.92478
Eclipse Obscuration	0.85522
Gamma	−0.94158
Sun Right Ascension	22h29m29.1s
Sun Declination	-09°28'36.0"
Sun Semi-Diameter	16'09.3"
Sun Equatorial Horizontal Parallax	08.9"
Moon Right Ascension	22h31m04.3s
Moon Declination	-10°14'09.7"
Moon Semi-Diameter	14'52.3"
Moon Equatorial Horizontal Parallax	0°54'34.6"
ΔT	16.2 s

== Eclipse season ==
This eclipse is part of an eclipse season, a period, roughly every six months, when eclipses occur. Only two (or occasionally three) eclipse seasons occur each year, and each season lasts about 35 days and repeats just short of six months (173 days) later; thus two full eclipse seasons always occur each year. Either two or three eclipses happen each eclipse season. In the sequence below, each eclipse is separated by a fortnight.

Eclipse season of February–March 1914
February 25 Ascending node (new moon)	March 12 Descending node (full moon)
Annular solar eclipse Solar Saros 119	Partial lunar eclipse Lunar Saros 131

== Related eclipses ==
=== Eclipses in 1914 ===
- An annular solar eclipse on February 25.
- A partial lunar eclipse on March 12.
- A total solar eclipse on August 21.
- A partial lunar eclipse on September 4.

=== Metonic ===
- Preceded by: Solar eclipse of May 9, 1910
- Followed by: Solar eclipse of December 14, 1917

=== Tzolkinex ===
- Preceded by: Solar eclipse of January 14, 1907
- Followed by: Solar eclipse of April 8, 1921

=== Half-Saros ===
- Preceded by: Lunar eclipse of February 19, 1905
- Followed by: Lunar eclipse of March 3, 1923

=== Tritos ===
- Preceded by: Solar eclipse of March 29, 1903
- Followed by: Solar eclipse of January 24, 1925

=== Solar Saros 119 ===
- Preceded by: Solar eclipse of February 13, 1896
- Followed by: Solar eclipse of March 7, 1932

=== Inex ===
- Preceded by: Solar eclipse of March 16, 1885
- Followed by: Solar eclipse of February 4, 1943

=== Triad ===
- Preceded by: Solar eclipse of April 26, 1827
- Followed by: Solar eclipse of December 25, 2000

=== Solar eclipses of 1913–1917 ===
This eclipse is a member of a semester series. An eclipse in a semester series of solar eclipses repeats approximately every 177 days and 4 hours (a semester) at alternating nodes of the Moon's orbit.

The partial solar eclipses on April 6, 1913 and September 30, 1913 occur in the previous lunar year eclipse set, and the solar eclipses on December 24, 1916 (partial), June 19, 1917 (partial), and December 14, 1917 (annular) occur in the next lunar year eclipse set.

Solar eclipse series sets from 1913 to 1917
Descending node			Ascending node		
Saros	Map	Gamma	Saros	Map	Gamma
114	August 31, 1913 Partial	1.4512	119	February 25, 1914 Annular	−0.9416
124	August 21, 1914 Total	0.7655	129	February 14, 1915 Annular	−0.2024
134	August 10, 1915 Annular	0.0124	139	February 3, 1916 Total	0.4987
144	July 30, 1916 Annular	−0.7709	149	January 23, 1917 Partial	1.1508
154	July 19, 1917 Partial	−1.5101			

=== Saros 119 ===
This eclipse is a part of Saros series 119, repeating every 18 years, 11 days, and containing 71 events. The series started with a partial solar eclipse on May 15, 850 AD. It contains total eclipses on August 9, 994 AD and August 20, 1012; a hybrid eclipse on August 31, 1030; and annular eclipses from September 10, 1048 through March 18, 1950. The series ends at member 71 as a partial eclipse on June 24, 2112. Its eclipses are tabulated in three columns; every third eclipse in the same column is one exeligmos apart, so they all cast shadows over approximately the same parts of the Earth.

The longest duration of totality was produced by member 10 at 32 seconds on August 20, 1012, and the longest duration of annularity was produced by member 44 at 7 minutes, 37 seconds on September 1, 1625. All eclipses in this series occur at the Moon’s ascending node of orbit.

Series members 54–71 occur between 1801 and 2112:
54	55	56
December 21, 1805	January 1, 1824	January 11, 1842
57	58	59
January 23, 1860	February 2, 1878	February 13, 1896
60	61	62
February 25, 1914	March 7, 1932	March 18, 1950
63	64	65
March 28, 1968	April 9, 1986	April 19, 2004
66	67	68
April 30, 2022	May 11, 2040	May 22, 2058
69	70	71
June 1, 2076	June 13, 2094	June 24, 2112

=== Metonic series ===
The metonic series repeats eclipses every 19 years (6939.69 days), lasting about 5 cycles. Eclipses occur in nearly the same calendar date. In addition, the octon subseries repeats 1/5 of that or every 3.8 years (1387.94 days). All eclipses in this table occur at the Moon's ascending node.

22 eclipse events between December 13, 1898 and July 20, 1982
December 13–14	October 1–2	July 20–21	May 9	February 24–25
111	113	115	117	119
December 13, 1898		July 21, 1906	May 9, 1910	February 25, 1914
121	123	125	127	129
December 14, 1917	October 1, 1921	July 20, 1925	May 9, 1929	February 24, 1933
131	133	135	137	139
December 13, 1936	October 1, 1940	July 20, 1944	May 9, 1948	February 25, 1952
141	143	145	147	149
December 14, 1955	October 2, 1959	July 20, 1963	May 9, 1967	February 25, 1971
151	153	155		
December 13, 1974	October 2, 1978	July 20, 1982		

=== Tritos series ===
This eclipse is a part of a tritos cycle, repeating at alternating nodes every 135 synodic months (≈ 3986.63 days, or 11 years minus 1 month). Their appearance and longitude are irregular due to a lack of synchronization with the anomalistic month (period of perigee), but groupings of 3 tritos cycles (≈ 33 years minus 3 months) come close (≈ 434.044 anomalistic months), so eclipses are similar in these groupings.

Series members between 1801 and 2200
January 1, 1805 (Saros 109)		October 31, 1826 (Saros 111)		August 28, 1848 (Saros 113)
July 29, 1859 (Saros 114)	June 28, 1870 (Saros 115)	May 27, 1881 (Saros 116)	April 26, 1892 (Saros 117)	March 29, 1903 (Saros 118)
February 25, 1914 (Saros 119)	January 24, 1925 (Saros 120)	December 25, 1935 (Saros 121)	November 23, 1946 (Saros 122)	October 23, 1957 (Saros 123)
September 22, 1968 (Saros 124)	August 22, 1979 (Saros 125)	July 22, 1990 (Saros 126)	June 21, 2001 (Saros 127)	May 20, 2012 (Saros 128)
April 20, 2023 (Saros 129)	March 20, 2034 (Saros 130)	February 16, 2045 (Saros 131)	January 16, 2056 (Saros 132)	December 17, 2066 (Saros 133)
November 15, 2077 (Saros 134)	October 14, 2088 (Saros 135)	September 14, 2099 (Saros 136)	August 15, 2110 (Saros 137)	July 14, 2121 (Saros 138)
June 13, 2132 (Saros 139)	May 14, 2143 (Saros 140)	April 12, 2154 (Saros 141)	March 12, 2165 (Saros 142)	February 10, 2176 (Saros 143)
January 9, 2187 (Saros 144)	December 9, 2197 (Saros 145)			

=== Inex series ===
This eclipse is a part of the long period inex cycle, repeating at alternating nodes, every 358 synodic months (≈ 10,571.95 days, or 29 years minus 20 days). Their appearance and longitude are irregular due to a lack of synchronization with the anomalistic month (period of perigee). However, groupings of 3 inex cycles (≈ 87 years minus 2 months) comes close (≈ 1,151.02 anomalistic months), so eclipses are similar in these groupings.

Series members between 1801 and 2200
April 26, 1827 (Saros 116)	April 5, 1856 (Saros 117)	March 16, 1885 (Saros 118)
February 25, 1914 (Saros 119)	February 4, 1943 (Saros 120)	January 16, 1972 (Saros 121)
December 25, 2000 (Saros 122)	December 5, 2029 (Saros 123)	November 16, 2058 (Saros 124)
October 26, 2087 (Saros 125)	October 6, 2116 (Saros 126)	September 16, 2145 (Saros 127)
August 27, 2174 (Saros 128)		
