= Solar eclipse of February 28, 2063 =

Future annular solar eclipse

- Annular eclipse
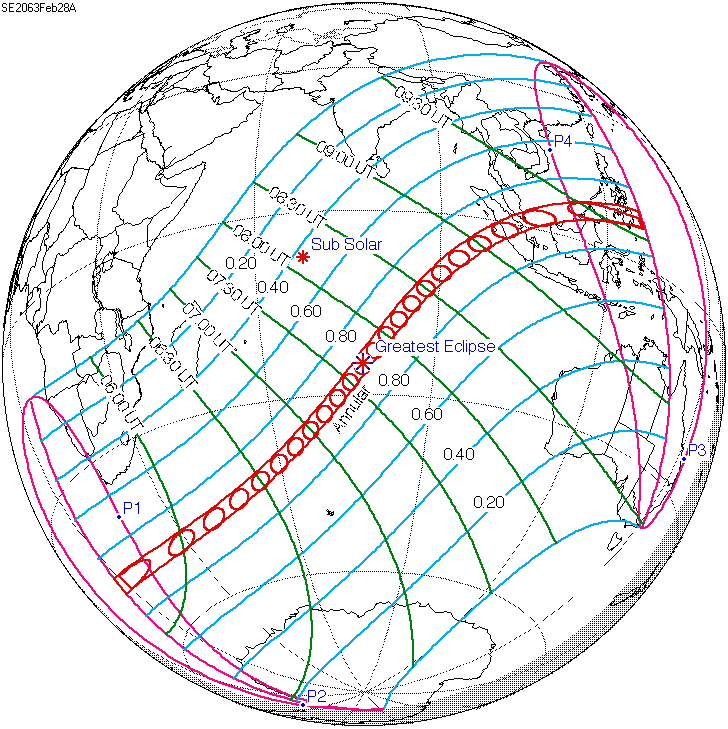
- Map
- Gamma: −0.336
- Magnitude: 0.9293

Maximum eclipse
- Duration: 461 s (7 min 41 s)
- Coordinates: 25.2°S 77.7°E
- Max. width of band: 280 km (170 mi)

Times (UTC)
- Greatest eclipse: 7:43:30

References
- Saros: 131 (53 of 70)
- Catalog # (SE5000): 9648

An annular solar eclipse will occur at the Moon's ascending node of orbit on Wednesday, February 28, 2063, with a magnitude of 0.9293. A solar eclipse occurs when the Moon passes between Earth and the Sun, thereby totally or partly obscuring the image of the Sun for a viewer on Earth. An annular solar eclipse occurs when the Moon's apparent diameter is smaller than the Sun's, blocking most of the Sun's light and causing the Sun to look like an annulus (ring). An annular eclipse appears as a partial eclipse over a region of the Earth thousands of kilometres wide. Occurring about 2.7 days after apogee (on February 25, 2063, at 16:30 UTC), the Moon's apparent diameter will be smaller.

The path of annularity will be visible from parts of the Prince Edward Islands, western Indonesia, Malaysia, Brunei, and the southern Philippines. A partial solar eclipse will also be visible for parts of Southern Africa, Antarctica, Australia, and Southeast Asia.

== Eclipse details ==
Shown below are two tables displaying details about this particular solar eclipse. The first table outlines times at which the Moon's penumbra or umbra attains the specific parameter, and the second table describes various other parameters pertaining to this eclipse.

February 28, 2063 Solar Eclipse Times
Event	Time (UTC)
First Penumbral External Contact	2063 February 28 at 04:42:05.6 UTC
First Umbral External Contact	2063 February 28 at 05:49:10.0 UTC
First Central Line	2063 February 28 at 05:52:20.5 UTC
First Umbral Internal Contact	2063 February 28 at 05:55:31.6 UTC
First Penumbral Internal Contact	2063 February 28 at 07:12:40.5 UTC
Equatorial Conjunction	2063 February 28 at 07:22:27.6 UTC
Greatest Duration	2063 February 28 at 07:28:49.9 UTC
Ecliptic Conjunction	2063 February 28 at 07:39:28.8 UTC
Greatest Eclipse	2063 February 28 at 07:43:30.0 UTC
Last Penumbral Internal Contact	2063 February 28 at 08:14:50.6 UTC
Last Umbral Internal Contact	2063 February 28 at 09:31:42.9 UTC
Last Central Line	2063 February 28 at 09:34:52.1 UTC
Last Umbral External Contact	2063 February 28 at 09:38:00.6 UTC
Last Penumbral External Contact	2063 February 28 at 10:44:59.0 UTC

February 28, 2063 Solar Eclipse Parameters
Parameter	Value
Eclipse Magnitude	0.92926
Eclipse Obscuration	0.86352
Gamma	−0.33604
Sun Right Ascension	22h45m11.8s
Sun Declination	-07°54'42.4"
Sun Semi-Diameter	16'08.9"
Sun Equatorial Horizontal Parallax	08.9"
Moon Right Ascension	22h45m46.2s
Moon Declination	-08°10'47.1"
Moon Semi-Diameter	14'47.6"
Moon Equatorial Horizontal Parallax	0°54'17.7"
ΔT	92.6 s

== Eclipse season ==
This eclipse is part of an eclipse season, a period, roughly every six months, when eclipses occur. Only two (or occasionally three) eclipse seasons occur each year, and each season lasts about 35 days and repeats just short of six months (173 days) later; thus two full eclipse seasons always occur each year. Either two or three eclipses happen each eclipse season. In the sequence below, each eclipse is separated by a fortnight.

Eclipse season of February–March 2063
February 27 Ascending node (new moon)	March 14 Descending node (full moon)
Annular solar eclipse Solar Saros 131	Partial lunar eclipse Lunar Saros 143

== Related eclipses ==
=== Eclipses in 2063 ===
- An annular solar eclipse on February 28.
- A partial lunar eclipse on March 14.
- A total solar eclipse on August 24.
- A penumbral lunar eclipse on September 7.

=== Metonic ===
- Preceded by: Solar eclipse of May 11, 2059
- Followed by: Solar eclipse of December 17, 2066

=== Tzolkinex ===
- Preceded by: Solar eclipse of January 16, 2056
- Followed by: Solar eclipse of April 11, 2070

=== Half-Saros ===
- Preceded by: Lunar eclipse of February 22, 2054
- Followed by: Lunar eclipse of March 4, 2072

=== Tritos ===
- Preceded by: Solar eclipse of March 30, 2052
- Followed by: Solar eclipse of January 27, 2074

=== Solar Saros 131 ===
- Preceded by: Solar eclipse of February 16, 2045
- Followed by: Solar eclipse of March 10, 2081

=== Inex ===
- Preceded by: Solar eclipse of March 20, 2034
- Followed by: Solar eclipse of February 7, 2092

=== Triad ===
- Preceded by: Solar eclipse of April 29, 1976
- Followed by: Solar eclipse of December 30, 2149

=== Solar eclipses of 2062–2065 ===
This eclipse is a member of a semester series. An eclipse in a semester series of solar eclipses repeats approximately every 177 days and 4 hours (a semester) at alternating nodes of the Moon's orbit.

The partial solar eclipses on July 3, 2065 and December 27, 2065 occur in the next lunar year eclipse set.

Solar eclipse series sets from 2062 to 2065
Ascending node			Descending node		
Saros	Map	Gamma	Saros	Map	Gamma
121	March 11, 2062 Partial	−1.0238	126	September 3, 2062 Partial	1.0191
131	February 28, 2063 Annular	−0.336	136	August 24, 2063 Total	0.2771
141	February 17, 2064 Annular	0.3597	146	August 12, 2064 Total	−0.4652
151	February 5, 2065 Partial	1.0336	156	August 2, 2065 Partial	−1.2759

=== Saros 131 ===
This eclipse is a part of Saros series 131, repeating every 18 years, 11 days, and containing 70 events. The series started with a partial solar eclipse on August 1, 1125. It contains total eclipses from March 27, 1522 through May 30, 1612; hybrid eclipses from June 10, 1630 through July 24, 1702; and annular eclipses from August 4, 1720 through June 18, 2243. The series ends at member 70 as a partial eclipse on September 2, 2369. Its eclipses are tabulated in three columns; every third eclipse in the same column is one exeligmos apart, so they all cast shadows over approximately the same parts of the Earth.

The longest duration of totality was produced by member 28 at 58 seconds on May 30, 1612, and the longest duration of annularity was produced by member 50 at 7 minutes, 54 seconds on January 26, 2009. All eclipses in this series occur at the Moon’s ascending node of orbit.

Series members 39–60 occur between 1801 and 2200:
39	40	41
September 28, 1810	October 9, 1828	October 20, 1846
42	43	44
October 30, 1864	November 10, 1882	November 22, 1900
45	46	47
December 3, 1918	December 13, 1936	December 25, 1954
48	49	50
January 4, 1973	January 15, 1991	January 26, 2009
51	52	53
February 6, 2027	February 16, 2045	February 28, 2063
54	55	56
March 10, 2081	March 21, 2099	April 2, 2117
57	58	59
April 13, 2135	April 23, 2153	May 5, 2171
60
May 15, 2189

=== Metonic series ===
The metonic series repeats eclipses every 19 years (6939.69 days), lasting about 5 cycles. Eclipses occur in nearly the same calendar date. In addition, the octon subseries repeats 1/5 of that or every 3.8 years (1387.94 days). All eclipses in this table occur at the Moon's ascending node.

21 eclipse events between July 23, 2036 and July 23, 2112
July 23–24	May 11	February 27–28	December 16–17	October 4–5
117	119	121	123	125
July 23, 2036	May 11, 2040	February 28, 2044	December 16, 2047	October 4, 2051
127	129	131	133	135
July 24, 2055	May 11, 2059	February 28, 2063	December 17, 2066	October 4, 2070
137	139	141	143	145
July 24, 2074	May 11, 2078	February 27, 2082	December 16, 2085	October 4, 2089
147	149	151	153	155
July 23, 2093	May 11, 2097	February 28, 2101	December 17, 2104	October 5, 2108
157
July 23, 2112

=== Tritos series ===
This eclipse is a part of a tritos cycle, repeating at alternating nodes every 135 synodic months (≈ 3986.63 days, or 11 years minus 1 month). Their appearance and longitude are irregular due to a lack of synchronization with the anomalistic month (period of perigee), but groupings of 3 tritos cycles (≈ 33 years minus 3 months) come close (≈ 434.044 anomalistic months), so eclipses are similar in these groupings.

Series members between 1801 and 2200
March 14, 1801 (Saros 107)	February 12, 1812 (Saros 108)	January 12, 1823 (Saros 109)		November 10, 1844 (Saros 111)
		August 9, 1877 (Saros 114)	July 9, 1888 (Saros 115)	June 8, 1899 (Saros 116)
May 9, 1910 (Saros 117)	April 8, 1921 (Saros 118)	March 7, 1932 (Saros 119)	February 4, 1943 (Saros 120)	January 5, 1954 (Saros 121)
December 4, 1964 (Saros 122)	November 3, 1975 (Saros 123)	October 3, 1986 (Saros 124)	September 2, 1997 (Saros 125)	August 1, 2008 (Saros 126)
July 2, 2019 (Saros 127)	June 1, 2030 (Saros 128)	April 30, 2041 (Saros 129)	March 30, 2052 (Saros 130)	February 28, 2063 (Saros 131)
January 27, 2074 (Saros 132)	December 27, 2084 (Saros 133)	November 27, 2095 (Saros 134)	October 26, 2106 (Saros 135)	September 26, 2117 (Saros 136)
August 25, 2128 (Saros 137)	July 25, 2139 (Saros 138)	June 25, 2150 (Saros 139)	May 25, 2161 (Saros 140)	April 23, 2172 (Saros 141)
March 23, 2183 (Saros 142)	February 21, 2194 (Saros 143)			

=== Inex series ===
This eclipse is a part of the long period inex cycle, repeating at alternating nodes, every 358 synodic months (≈ 10,571.95 days, or 29 years minus 20 days). Their appearance and longitude are irregular due to a lack of synchronization with the anomalistic month (period of perigee). However, groupings of 3 inex cycles (≈ 87 years minus 2 months) comes close (≈ 1,151.02 anomalistic months), so eclipses are similar in these groupings.

Series members between 1801 and 2200
August 28, 1802 (Saros 122)	August 7, 1831 (Saros 123)	July 18, 1860 (Saros 124)
June 28, 1889 (Saros 125)	June 8, 1918 (Saros 126)	May 20, 1947 (Saros 127)
April 29, 1976 (Saros 128)	April 8, 2005 (Saros 129)	March 20, 2034 (Saros 130)
February 28, 2063 (Saros 131)	February 7, 2092 (Saros 132)	January 19, 2121 (Saros 133)
December 30, 2149 (Saros 134)	December 9, 2178 (Saros 135)	
