= Solar eclipse of January 16, 1972 =

20th-century annular solar eclipse

- Annular eclipse
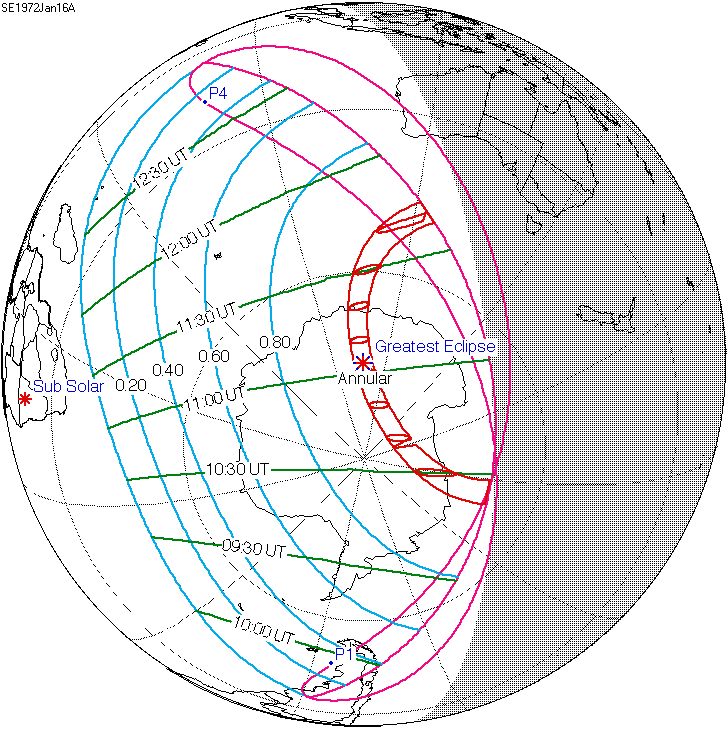
- Map
- Gamma: −0.9365
- Magnitude: 0.9692

Maximum eclipse
- Duration: 113 s (1 min 53 s)
- Coordinates: 74.9°S 107.7°E
- Max. width of band: 321 km (199 mi)

Times (UTC)
- Greatest eclipse: 11:03:22

References
- Saros: 121 (58 of 71)
- Catalog # (SE5000): 9447

An annular solar eclipse occurred at the Moon's ascending node of orbit on Sunday, January 16, 1972, with a magnitude of 0.9692. A solar eclipse occurs when the Moon passes between Earth and the Sun, thereby totally or partly obscuring the image of the Sun for a viewer on Earth. An annular solar eclipse occurs when the Moon's apparent diameter is smaller than the Sun's, blocking most of the Sun's light and causing the Sun to look like an annulus (ring). An annular eclipse appears as a partial eclipse over a region of the Earth thousands of kilometres wide. Occurring about 7.3 days after apogee (on January 9, 1972, at 3:30 UTC), the Moon's apparent diameter was smaller.

Annularity was visible from a part of Antarctica. A partial eclipse was visible for parts of Antarctica and extreme southern South America.

== Eclipse details ==
Shown below are two tables displaying details about this particular solar eclipse. The first table outlines times at which the Moon's penumbra or umbra attains the specific parameter, and the second table describes various other parameters pertaining to this eclipse.

January 16, 1972 Solar Eclipse Times
Event	Time (UTC)
First Penumbral External Contact	1972 January 16 at 08:45:57.2 UTC
First Umbral External Contact	1972 January 16 at 10:22:15.3 UTC
First Central Line	1972 January 16 at 10:25:28.8 UTC
Greatest Duration	1972 January 16 at 10:25:28.8 UTC
First Umbral Internal Contact	1972 January 16 at 10:28:57.8 UTC
Equatorial Conjunction	1972 January 16 at 10:33:15.2 UTC
Ecliptic Conjunction	1972 January 16 at 10:53:05.1 UTC
Greatest Eclipse	1972 January 16 at 11:03:22.3 UTC
Last Umbral Internal Contact	1972 January 16 at 11:38:09.6 UTC
Last Central Line	1972 January 16 at 11:41:35.3 UTC
Last Umbral External Contact	1972 January 16 at 11:44:45.6 UTC
Last Penumbral External Contact	1972 January 16 at 13:20:54.1 UTC

January 16, 1972 Solar Eclipse Parameters
Parameter	Value
Eclipse Magnitude	0.96925
Eclipse Obscuration	0.93945
Gamma	−0.93651
Sun Right Ascension	19h49m32.3s
Sun Declination	-21°03'34.9"
Sun Semi-Diameter	16'15.5"
Sun Equatorial Horizontal Parallax	08.9"
Moon Right Ascension	19h50m37.0s
Moon Declination	-21°55'10.9"
Moon Semi-Diameter	15'40.7"
Moon Equatorial Horizontal Parallax	0°57'32.6"
ΔT	42.3 s

== Eclipse season ==
This eclipse is part of an eclipse season, a period, roughly every six months, when eclipses occur. Only two (or occasionally three) eclipse seasons occur each year, and each season lasts about 35 days and repeats just short of six months (173 days) later; thus two full eclipse seasons always occur each year. Either two or three eclipses happen each eclipse season. In the sequence below, each eclipse is separated by a fortnight.

Eclipse season of January 1972
January 16 Ascending node (new moon)	January 30 Descending node (full moon)
Annular solar eclipse Solar Saros 121	Total lunar eclipse Lunar Saros 133

== Related eclipses ==
=== Eclipses in 1972 ===
- An annular solar eclipse on January 16.
- A total lunar eclipse on January 30.
- A total solar eclipse on July 10.
- A partial lunar eclipse on July 26.

=== Metonic ===
- Preceded by: Solar eclipse of March 28, 1968
- Followed by: Solar eclipse of November 3, 1975

=== Tzolkinex ===
- Preceded by: Solar eclipse of December 4, 1964
- Followed by: Solar eclipse of February 26, 1979

=== Half-Saros ===
- Preceded by: Lunar eclipse of January 9, 1963
- Followed by: Lunar eclipse of January 20, 1981

=== Tritos ===
- Preceded by: Solar eclipse of February 15, 1961
- Followed by: Solar eclipse of December 15, 1982

=== Solar Saros 121 ===
- Preceded by: Solar eclipse of January 5, 1954
- Followed by: Solar eclipse of January 26, 1990

=== Inex ===
- Preceded by: Solar eclipse of February 4, 1943
- Followed by: Solar eclipse of December 25, 2000

=== Triad ===
- Preceded by: Solar eclipse of March 16, 1885
- Followed by: Solar eclipse of November 16, 2058

=== Solar eclipses of 1971–1974 ===
This eclipse is a member of a semester series. An eclipse in a semester series of solar eclipses repeats approximately every 177 days and 4 hours (a semester) at alternating nodes of the Moon's orbit.

The partial solar eclipses on February 25, 1971 and August 20, 1971 occur in the previous lunar year eclipse set.

Solar eclipse series sets from 1971 to 1974
Descending node			Ascending node		
Saros	Map	Gamma	Saros	Map	Gamma
116	July 22, 1971 Partial	1.513	121	January 16, 1972 Annular	−0.9365
126	July 10, 1972 Total	0.6872	131	January 4, 1973 Annular	−0.2644
136	June 30, 1973 Total	−0.0785	141	December 24, 1973 Annular	0.4171
146	June 20, 1974 Total	−0.8239	151	December 13, 1974 Partial	1.0797

=== Saros 121 ===
This eclipse is a part of Saros series 121, repeating every 18 years, 11 days, and containing 71 events. The series started with a partial solar eclipse on April 25, 944 AD. It contains total eclipses from July 10, 1070 through October 9, 1809; hybrid eclipses on October 20, 1827 and October 30, 1845; and annular eclipses from November 11, 1863 through February 28, 2044. The series ends at member 71 as a partial eclipse on June 7, 2206. Its eclipses are tabulated in three columns; every third eclipse in the same column is one exeligmos apart, so they all cast shadows over approximately the same parts of the Earth.

The longest duration of totality was produced by member 39 at 6 minutes, 20 seconds on June 21, 1629, and the longest duration of annularity will be produced by member 62 at 2 minutes, 27 seconds on February 28, 2044. All eclipses in this series occur at the Moon’s ascending node of orbit.

Series members 49–70 occur between 1801 and 2200:
49	50	51
October 9, 1809	October 20, 1827	October 30, 1845
52	53	54
November 11, 1863	November 21, 1881	December 3, 1899
55	56	57
December 14, 1917	December 25, 1935	January 5, 1954
58	59	60
January 16, 1972	January 26, 1990	February 7, 2008
61	62	63
February 17, 2026	February 28, 2044	March 11, 2062
64	65	66
March 21, 2080	April 1, 2098	April 13, 2116
67	68	69
April 24, 2134	May 4, 2152	May 16, 2170
70
May 26, 2188

=== Metonic series ===
The metonic series repeats eclipses every 19 years (6939.69 days), lasting about 5 cycles. Eclipses occur in nearly the same calendar date. In addition, the octon subseries repeats 1/5 of that or every 3.8 years (1387.94 days). All eclipses in this table occur at the Moon's ascending node.

20 eclipse events between June 10, 1964 and August 21, 2036
June 10–11	March 28–29	January 14–16	November 3	August 21–22
117	119	121	123	125
June 10, 1964	March 28, 1968	January 16, 1972	November 3, 1975	August 22, 1979
127	129	131	133	135
June 11, 1983	March 29, 1987	January 15, 1991	November 3, 1994	August 22, 1998
137	139	141	143	145
June 10, 2002	March 29, 2006	January 15, 2010	November 3, 2013	August 21, 2017
147	149	151	153	155
June 10, 2021	March 29, 2025	January 14, 2029	November 3, 2032	August 21, 2036

=== Tritos series ===
This eclipse is a part of a tritos cycle, repeating at alternating nodes every 135 synodic months (≈ 3986.63 days, or 11 years minus 1 month). Their appearance and longitude are irregular due to a lack of synchronization with the anomalistic month (period of perigee), but groupings of 3 tritos cycles (≈ 33 years minus 3 months) come close (≈ 434.044 anomalistic months), so eclipses are similar in these groupings.

Series members between 1801 and 2200
March 25, 1819 (Saros 107)	February 23, 1830 (Saros 108)	January 22, 1841 (Saros 109)		November 21, 1862 (Saros 111)
		August 20, 1895 (Saros 114)	July 21, 1906 (Saros 115)	June 19, 1917 (Saros 116)
May 19, 1928 (Saros 117)	April 19, 1939 (Saros 118)	March 18, 1950 (Saros 119)	February 15, 1961 (Saros 120)	January 16, 1972 (Saros 121)
December 15, 1982 (Saros 122)	November 13, 1993 (Saros 123)	October 14, 2004 (Saros 124)	September 13, 2015 (Saros 125)	August 12, 2026 (Saros 126)
July 13, 2037 (Saros 127)	June 11, 2048 (Saros 128)	May 11, 2059 (Saros 129)	April 11, 2070 (Saros 130)	March 10, 2081 (Saros 131)
February 7, 2092 (Saros 132)	January 8, 2103 (Saros 133)	December 8, 2113 (Saros 134)	November 6, 2124 (Saros 135)	October 7, 2135 (Saros 136)
September 6, 2146 (Saros 137)	August 5, 2157 (Saros 138)	July 5, 2168 (Saros 139)	June 5, 2179 (Saros 140)	May 4, 2190 (Saros 141)

=== Inex series ===
This eclipse is a part of the long period inex cycle, repeating at alternating nodes, every 358 synodic months (≈ 10,571.95 days, or 29 years minus 20 days). Their appearance and longitude are irregular due to a lack of synchronization with the anomalistic month (period of perigee). However, groupings of 3 inex cycles (≈ 87 years minus 2 months) comes close (≈ 1,151.02 anomalistic months), so eclipses are similar in these groupings.

Series members between 1801 and 2200
April 26, 1827 (Saros 116)	April 5, 1856 (Saros 117)	March 16, 1885 (Saros 118)
February 25, 1914 (Saros 119)	February 4, 1943 (Saros 120)	January 16, 1972 (Saros 121)
December 25, 2000 (Saros 122)	December 5, 2029 (Saros 123)	November 16, 2058 (Saros 124)
October 26, 2087 (Saros 125)	October 6, 2116 (Saros 126)	September 16, 2145 (Saros 127)
August 27, 2174 (Saros 128)		
