= Solar eclipse of August 23, 2044 =

Total eclipse

- Total eclipse
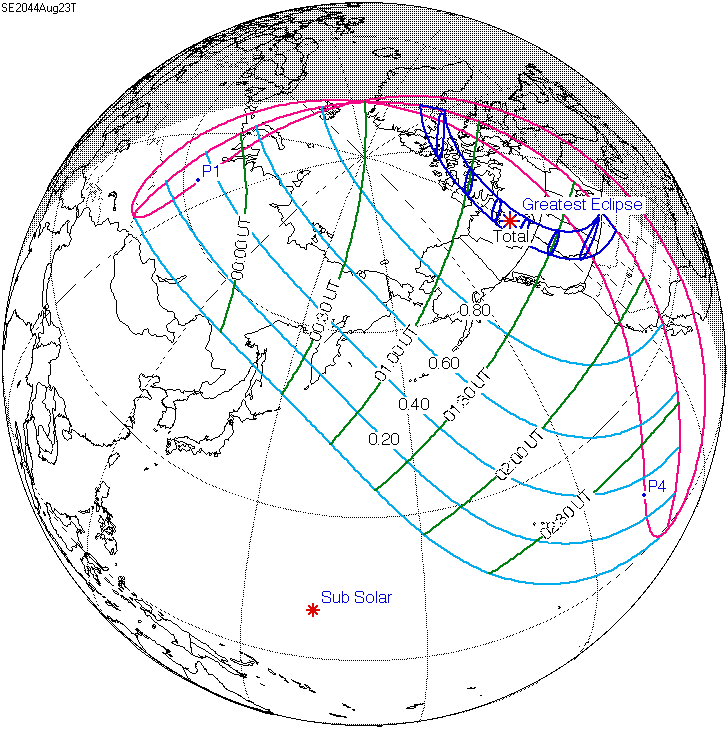
- Map
- Gamma: 0.9613
- Magnitude: 1.0364

Maximum eclipse
- Duration: 124 s (2 min 4 s)
- Coordinates: 64.3°N 120.4°W
- Max. width of band: 453 km (281 mi)

Times (UTC)
- Greatest eclipse: 1:17:02

References
- Saros: 126 (49 of 72)
- Catalog # (SE5000): 9606

A total solar eclipse will occur at the Moon's descending node of orbit between Monday, August 22 and Tuesday, August 23, 2044, with a magnitude of 1.0364. A solar eclipse occurs when the Moon passes between Earth and the Sun, thereby totally or partly obscuring the image of the Sun for a viewer on Earth. A total solar eclipse occurs when the Moon's apparent diameter is larger than the Sun's, blocking all direct sunlight, turning day into darkness. Totality occurs in a narrow path across Earth's surface, with the partial solar eclipse visible over a surrounding region thousands of kilometres wide. Occurring about 2.1 days after perigee (on August 21, 2044, at 0:00 UTC), the Moon's apparent diameter will be larger.

This will be the last of 41 umbral solar eclipses in Solar Saros 126.

== Path ==
Totality will be visible in the evening of August 22 across:

- Northwestern Greenland
- In Canada:
  - Northern and western Nunavut
  - Central Northwest Territories
  - Extreme southeast Yukon
  - Eastern British Columbia, including Dawson Creek and Fernie
  - Much of Alberta including Edmonton, Calgary, and Lethbridge
  - Southwestern Saskatchewan, including Swift Current
- In the United States:
  - The northeastern half of Montana. Glacier National Park, Great Falls, Lewistown, and Forsyth will be just inside the path of totality.
  - Western North Dakota, including Williston, Minot, and Dickinson
  - Extreme northwest South Dakota

Even though the date of the eclipse is widely listed as August 23 among sources, nearly the entire path of totality in the United States and Canada actually sees the whole event on August 22. A partial solar eclipse will be visible in Siberia in the morning hours of August 23.

The greatest duration of the total eclipse will be observed in the Northwest Territories, approximately 60 miles (97 km) southeast of Great Bear Lake.

== Images ==
Animated path

== Eclipse timing ==
=== Places experiencing total eclipse ===
Solar Eclipse of August 23, 2044 (Local Times)
Country or territory	City or place	Start of partial eclipse	Start of total eclipse	Maximum eclipse	End of total eclipse	End of partial eclipse	Duration of totality (min:s)	Duration of eclipse (hr:min)	Maximum magnitude
Greenland	Qaanaaq	22:53:41 (Note: The time listed here for this location occurs on August 22, 2044, local time.)	23:46:59	23:47:46	23:48:35	00:41:05	1:36	1:47	1.0102
Greenland	Savissivik	22:55:16	23:47:56	23:48:47	23:49:38	00:41:29	1:42	1:46	1.0151
Greenland	Nuussuaq	22:56:18	23:48:02	23:48:49	23:49:37	00:06:32 (sunset)	1:35	1:10	1.0121
Greenland	Pituffik (Note: The times listed for this location occur on August 22, 2044, local time.)	20:55:05	21:48:05	21:48:57	21:49:49	22:41:59	1:44	1:47	1.0163
Canada	Grise Fiord	19:56:58	20:51:01	20:51:52	20:52:44	21:45:46	1:43	1:49	1.0119
Canada	Resolute	19:00:31	19:55:41	19:56:18	19:56:55	20:50:48	1:14	1:50	1.0045
Canada	Ulukhaktok	18:05:42	19:03:07	19:04:04	19:05:02	20:00:37	1:55	1:55	1.012
Canada	Wrigley	18:18:05	19:16:46	19:17:35	19:18:24	20:14:30	1:38	1:56	1.0072
Canada	Fort Nelson	17:26:39	18:25:09	18:25:58	18:26:46	19:22:21	1:37	1:56	1.007
Canada	High Level	18:28:38	19:25:58	19:26:43	19:27:29	20:22:00	1:31	1:53	1.0068
Canada	Fort St. John	17:32:03	18:29:58	18:30:51	18:31:43	19:26:35	1:45	1:55	1.0093
Canada	Dawson Creek	17:33:08	18:30:51	18:31:46	18:32:40	19:27:19	1:49	1:54	1.0106
Canada	Chetwynd	17:32:53	18:31:12	18:31:50	18:32:27	19:27:39	1:15	1:55	1.0042
Canada	Grande Prairie	18:34:37	19:31:53	19:32:52	19:33:50	20:28:03	1:57	1:53	1.0148
Canada	St. Albert	18:38:29	19:34:39	19:35:23	19:36:07	20:29:20	1:28	1:51	1.0069
Canada	Edmonton	18:38:40	19:34:48	19:35:32	19:36:16	20:29:26	1:28	1:51	1.0068
Canada	Strathcona County	18:38:46	19:34:52	19:35:34	19:36:14	20:29:23	1:22	1:51	1.0059
Canada	Camrose	18:39:45	19:35:41	19:36:24	19:37:08	20:30:06	1:27	1:50	1.0067
Canada	Wetaskiwin	18:39:46	19:35:45	19:36:32	19:37:20	20:30:20	1:35	1:51	1.0087
Canada	Rocky Mountain House	18:40:39	19:36:47	19:37:44	19:38:40	20:31:45	1:53	1:51	1.0169
Canada	Red Deer	18:41:01	19:36:55	19:37:49	19:38:43	20:31:35	1:48	1:51	1.0134
Canada	Golden	18:42:21	19:39:08	19:39:48	19:40:29	20:34:04	1:21	1:52	1.0054
Canada	Banff	18:42:48	19:39:04	19:39:55	19:40:45	20:33:52	1:41	1:51	1.0101
Canada	Calgary	18:43:16	19:39:04	19:40:00	19:40:54	20:33:38	1:50	1:50	1.0147
Canada	Invermere	18:43:59	19:40:31	19:41:08	19:41:45	20:35:05	1:14	1:51	1.0047
Canada	Medicine Hat	18:45:27	19:40:22	19:41:15	19:42:07	20:25:40 (sunset)	1:45	1:40	1.0146
Canada	Lethbridge	18:45:55	19:41:21	19:42:11	19:43:02	20:33:37 (sunset)	1:41	1:48	1.0109
United States	Williston	19:48:47	20:41:57	20:42:42	20:43:26	20:53:38 (sunset)	1:29	1:05	1.0097
United States	Dickinson	18:50:54	19:43:38	19:44:26	19:45:14	19:47:55 (sunset)	1:36	0:57	1.0145
United States	Great Falls	18:50:02	19:45:24	19:45:38	19:45:53	20:23:05 (sunset)	0:29	1:33	1.0009

=== Places experiencing partial eclipse ===
Solar Eclipse of August 23, 2044 (Local Times)
Country or territory	City or place	Start of partial eclipse	Maximum eclipse	End of partial eclipse	Duration of eclipse (hr:min)	Maximum coverage
Russia	Omsk	05:56:45 (sunrise)	06:00:41	06:12:54	0:16	4.28%
Svalbard and Jan Mayen	Longyearbyen	01:30:47	02:22:16	03:14:10	1:43	78.68%
Russia	Magadan	10:35:54	11:25:36	12:15:58	1:40	18.89%
Greenland	Upernavik	22:57:54	23:32:55	23:42:45 (sunset)	0:45	60.61%
Russia	Anadyr	11:44:44	12:47:05	13:48:29	2:04	52.22%
Canada	Pond Inlet	20:02:48	20:56:39	21:49:20	1:47	98.64%
United States	Minneapolis	19:52:11	20:03:24	20:06:30 (sunset)	0:14	11.89%
Canada	Inuvik	18:05:26	19:06:14	20:04:53	1:59	95.57%
United States	Oklahoma City	20:08:20	20:08:40	20:09:31 (sunset)	0:01	0.06%
United States	Adak	15:08:48	16:10:55	17:10:41	2:02	37.53%
Canada	Coral Harbour	19:18:16	20:11:05	20:20:52 (sunset)	1:03	94.50%
United States	Anchorage	16:09:48	17:13:50	18:15:03	2:05	81.29%
Canada	Baker Lake	19:19:28	20:14:09	21:06:55	1:47	95.32%
United States	Unalaska	16:11:37	17:16:36	18:18:34	2:07	54.49%
Canada	Whitehorse	17:18:23	18:20:12	19:19:03	2:01	94.01%
Canada	Winnipeg	19:44:59	20:25:33	20:31:17 (sunset)	0:46	72.21%
Canada	Regina	18:44:46	19:39:15	20:02:18 (sunset)	1:18	99.85%
United States	Denver	19:03:17	19:42:18	19:45:08 (sunset)	0:42	67.38%
Canada	Vancouver	17:44:47	18:43:35	19:38:51	1:54	96.57%
United States	Seattle	17:48:11	18:46:35	19:41:25	1:53	95.65%
Mexico	Hermosillo	18:22:15	18:53:17	18:55:46 (sunset)	0:34	45.37%
United States	Salt Lake City	19:02:07	19:56:44	20:14:12 (sunset)	1:12	92.94%
United States Minor Outlying Islands	Midway Atoll	14:28:40	14:58:20	15:26:56	0:58	2.69%
United States	Phoenix	18:14:57	19:01:39	19:05:12 (sunset)	0:50	76.09%
United States	San Francisco	18:06:57	19:03:36	19:52:03 (sunset)	1:45	83.54%
United States	Las Vegas	18:10:25	19:04:48	19:20:54 (sunset)	1:10	84.57%
United States	Los Angeles	18:14:12	19:08:46	19:30:38 (sunset)	1:16	79.56%
Mexico	Mexicali	18:16:40	19:10:07	19:17:44 (sunset)	1:01	78.17%
Mexico	Tijuana	18:16:57	19:10:45	19:23:56 (sunset)	1:07	77.30%
United States	Honolulu	15:39:53	16:26:35	17:10:11	1:30	17.41%

== Eclipse details ==
Shown below are two tables displaying details about this particular solar eclipse. The first table outlines times at which the Moon's penumbra or umbra attains the specific parameter, and the second table describes various other parameters pertaining to this eclipse.

August 23, 2044 Solar Eclipse Times
Event	Time (UTC)
First Penumbral External Contact	2044 August 22 at 23:10:51.7 UTC
Equatorial Conjunction	2044 August 23 at 00:27:10.1 UTC
First Umbral External Contact	2044 August 23 at 00:46:01.0 UTC
First Central Line	2044 August 23 at 00:49:11.6 UTC
First Umbral Internal Contact	2044 August 23 at 00:52:44.5 UTC
Ecliptic Conjunction	2044 August 23 at 01:07:14.0 UTC
Greatest Duration	2044 August 23 at 01:16:35.8 UTC
Greatest Eclipse	2044 August 23 at 01:17:01.7 UTC
Last Umbral Internal Contact	2044 August 23 at 01:41:52.4 UTC
Last Central Line	2044 August 23 at 01:45:22.9 UTC
Last Umbral External Contact	2044 August 23 at 01:48:31.2 UTC
Last Penumbral External Contact	2044 August 23 at 03:23:35.9 UTC

August 23, 2044 Solar Eclipse Parameters
Parameter	Value
Eclipse Magnitude	1.03644
Eclipse Obscuration	1.07420
Gamma	0.96130
Sun Right Ascension	10h10m33.4s
Sun Declination	+11°16'02.2"
Sun Semi-Diameter	15'48.9"
Sun Equatorial Horizontal Parallax	08.7"
Moon Right Ascension	10h12m17.2s
Moon Declination	+12°07'34.4"
Moon Semi-Diameter	16'19.6"
Moon Equatorial Horizontal Parallax	0°59'55.1"
ΔT	81.0 s

== Eclipse season ==
This eclipse is part of an eclipse season, a period, roughly every six months, when eclipses occur. Only two (or occasionally three) eclipse seasons occur each year, and each season lasts about 35 days and repeats just short of six months (173 days) later; thus two full eclipse seasons always occur each year. Either two or three eclipses happen each eclipse season. In the sequence below, each eclipse is separated by a fortnight.

Eclipse season of August–September 2044
August 23 Descending node (new moon)	September 7 Ascending node (full moon)
Total solar eclipse Solar Saros 126	Total lunar eclipse Lunar Saros 138

== Related eclipses ==
=== Eclipses in 2044 ===
- An annular solar eclipse on February 28.
- A total lunar eclipse on March 13.
- A total solar eclipse on August 23.
- A total lunar eclipse on September 7.

=== Metonic ===
- Preceded by: Solar eclipse of November 4, 2040
- Followed by: Solar eclipse of June 11, 2048

=== Tzolkinex ===
- Preceded by: Solar eclipse of July 13, 2037
- Followed by: Solar eclipse of October 4, 2051

=== Half-Saros ===
- Preceded by: Lunar eclipse of August 19, 2035
- Followed by: Lunar eclipse of August 29, 2053

=== Tritos ===
- Preceded by: Solar eclipse of September 23, 2033
- Followed by: Solar eclipse of July 24, 2055

=== Solar Saros 126 ===
- Preceded by: Solar eclipse of August 12, 2026
- Followed by: Solar eclipse of September 3, 2062

=== Inex ===
- Preceded by: Solar eclipse of September 13, 2015
- Followed by: Solar eclipse of August 3, 2073

=== Triad ===
- Preceded by: Solar eclipse of October 23, 1957
- Followed by: Solar eclipse of June 25, 2131

=== Solar eclipses of 2044–2047 ===
This eclipse is a member of a semester series. An eclipse in a semester series of solar eclipses repeats approximately every 177 days and 4 hours (a semester) at alternating nodes of the Moon's orbit.

The partial solar eclipses on June 23, 2047 and December 16, 2047 occur in the next lunar year eclipse set.

Solar eclipse series sets from 2044 to 2047
Ascending node			Descending node		
Saros	Map	Gamma	Saros	Map	Gamma
121	February 28, 2044 Annular	−0.9954	126	August 23, 2044 Total	0.9613
131	February 16, 2045 Annular	−0.3125	136	August 12, 2045 Total	0.2116
141	February 5, 2046 Annular	0.3765	146	August 2, 2046 Total	−0.535
151	January 26, 2047 Partial	1.045	156	July 22, 2047 Partial	−1.3477

=== Saros 126 ===
This eclipse is a part of Saros series 126, repeating every 18 years, 11 days, and containing 72 events. The series started with a partial solar eclipse on March 10, 1179. It contains annular eclipses from June 4, 1323 through April 4, 1810; hybrid eclipses from April 14, 1828 through May 6, 1864; and total eclipses from May 17, 1882 through August 23, 2044. The series ends at member 72 as a partial eclipse on May 3, 2459. Its eclipses are tabulated in three columns; every third eclipse in the same column is one exeligmos apart, so they all cast shadows over approximately the same parts of the Earth.

The longest duration of annularity was produced by member 11 at 6 minutes, 30 seconds on June 26, 1359, and the longest duration of totality was produced by member 45 at 2 minutes, 36 seconds on July 10, 1972. All eclipses in this series occur at the Moon’s descending node of orbit.

Series members 36–57 occur between 1801 and 2200:
36	37	38
April 4, 1810	April 14, 1828	April 25, 1846
39	40	41
May 6, 1864	May 17, 1882	May 28, 1900
42	43	44
June 8, 1918	June 19, 1936	June 30, 1954
45	46	47
July 10, 1972	July 22, 1990	August 1, 2008
48	49	50
August 12, 2026	August 23, 2044	September 3, 2062
51	52	53
September 13, 2080	September 25, 2098	October 6, 2116
54	55	56
October 17, 2134	October 28, 2152	November 8, 2170
57
November 18, 2188

=== Metonic series ===
The metonic series repeats eclipses every 19 years (6939.69 days), lasting about 5 cycles. Eclipses occur in nearly the same calendar date. In addition, the octon subseries repeats 1/5 of that or every 3.8 years (1387.94 days). All eclipses in this table occur at the Moon's descending node.

22 eclipse events between June 12, 2029 and November 4, 2116
June 11–12	March 30–31	January 16	November 4–5	August 23–24
118	120	122	124	126
June 12, 2029	March 30, 2033	January 16, 2037	November 4, 2040	August 23, 2044
128	130	132	134	136
June 11, 2048	March 30, 2052	January 16, 2056	November 5, 2059	August 24, 2063
138	140	142	144	146
June 11, 2067	March 31, 2071	January 16, 2075	November 4, 2078	August 24, 2082
148	150	152	154	156
June 11, 2086	March 31, 2090	January 16, 2094	November 4, 2097	August 24, 2101
158	160	162	164	
June 12, 2105			November 4, 2116	

=== Tritos series ===
This eclipse is a part of a tritos cycle, repeating at alternating nodes every 135 synodic months (≈ 3986.63 days, or 11 years minus 1 month). Their appearance and longitude are irregular due to a lack of synchronization with the anomalistic month (period of perigee), but groupings of 3 tritos cycles (≈ 33 years minus 3 months) come close (≈ 434.044 anomalistic months), so eclipses are similar in these groupings.

Series members between 1837 and 2200
April 5, 1837 (Saros 107)	March 5, 1848 (Saros 108)	February 3, 1859 (Saros 109)		December 2, 1880 (Saros 111)
		August 31, 1913 (Saros 114)	July 31, 1924 (Saros 115)	June 30, 1935 (Saros 116)
May 30, 1946 (Saros 117)	April 30, 1957 (Saros 118)	March 28, 1968 (Saros 119)	February 26, 1979 (Saros 120)	January 26, 1990 (Saros 121)
December 25, 2000 (Saros 122)	November 25, 2011 (Saros 123)	October 25, 2022 (Saros 124)	September 23, 2033 (Saros 125)	August 23, 2044 (Saros 126)
July 24, 2055 (Saros 127)	June 22, 2066 (Saros 128)	May 22, 2077 (Saros 129)	April 21, 2088 (Saros 130)	March 21, 2099 (Saros 131)
February 18, 2110 (Saros 132)	January 19, 2121 (Saros 133)	December 19, 2131 (Saros 134)	November 17, 2142 (Saros 135)	October 17, 2153 (Saros 136)
September 16, 2164 (Saros 137)	August 16, 2175 (Saros 138)	July 16, 2186 (Saros 139)	June 15, 2197 (Saros 140)	

=== Inex series ===
This eclipse is a part of the long period inex cycle, repeating at alternating nodes, every 358 synodic months (≈ 10,571.95 days, or 29 years minus 20 days). Their appearance and longitude are irregular due to a lack of synchronization with the anomalistic month (period of perigee). However, groupings of 3 inex cycles (≈ 87 years minus 2 months) comes close (≈ 1,151.02 anomalistic months), so eclipses are similar in these groupings.

Series members between 1801 and 2200
February 1, 1813 (Saros 118)	January 11, 1842 (Saros 119)	December 22, 1870 (Saros 120)
December 3, 1899 (Saros 121)	November 12, 1928 (Saros 122)	October 23, 1957 (Saros 123)
October 3, 1986 (Saros 124)	September 13, 2015 (Saros 125)	August 23, 2044 (Saros 126)
August 3, 2073 (Saros 127)	July 15, 2102 (Saros 128)	June 25, 2131 (Saros 129)
June 4, 2160 (Saros 130)	May 15, 2189 (Saros 131)	
