= Solar eclipse of March 4, 1802 =

Total Solar eclipse March 4, 1802

- Total eclipse
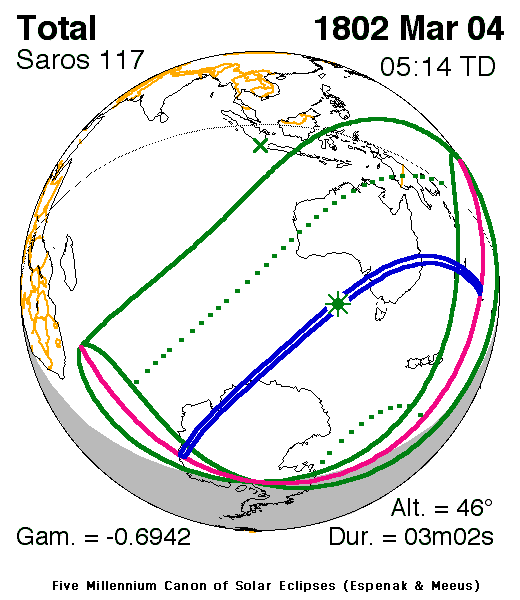
- Map
- Gamma: −0.6943
- Magnitude: 1.0428

Maximum eclipse
- Duration: 182 s (3 min 2 s)
- Coordinates: 44°S 131.5°E
- Max. width of band: 196 km (122 mi)

Times (UTC)
- Greatest eclipse: 5:14:29

References
- Saros: 117 (57 of 71)
- Catalog # (SE5000): 9045

A total solar eclipse occurred at the Moon's ascending node of orbit on Thursday, March 4, 1802, with a magnitude of 1.0428. A solar eclipse occurs when the Moon passes between Earth and the Sun, thereby totally or partly obscuring the image of the Sun for a viewer on Earth. A total solar eclipse occurs when the Moon's apparent diameter is larger than the Sun's, blocking all direct sunlight, turning day into darkness. Totality occurs in a narrow path across Earth's surface, with the partial solar eclipse visible over a surrounding region thousands of kilometres wide. Occurring about 1 day after perigee (on March 3, 1802, at 4:20 UTC), the Moon's apparent diameter was larger.

The path of totality was visible from parts of modern-day Antarctica, Australia, and Vanuatu. A partial solar eclipse was also visible for parts of Antarctica, Australia, Indonesia, and Oceania.

The eclipse was observed by Matthew Flinders aboard HMS Investigator as a 97% partial eclipse.

== Eclipse details ==
Shown below are two tables displaying details about this particular solar eclipse. The first table outlines times at which the Moon's penumbra or umbra attains the specific parameter, and the second table describes various other parameters pertaining to this eclipse.

March 4, 1802 Solar Eclipse Times
Event	Time (UTC)
First Penumbral External Contact	1802 March 4 at 02:52:19.8 UTC
First Umbral External Contact	1802 March 4 at 03:59:05.4 UTC
First Central Line	1802 March 4 at 04:00:14.2 UTC
First Umbral Internal Contact	1802 March 4 at 04:01:23.4 UTC
Equatorial Conjunction	1802 March 4 at 04:35:58.0 UTC
Ecliptic Conjunction	1802 March 4 at 05:07:25.2 UTC
Greatest Duration	1802 March 4 at 05:12:48.7 UTC
Greatest Eclipse	1802 March 4 at 05:14:28.9 UTC
Last Umbral Internal Contact	1802 March 4 at 06:27:59.7 UTC
Last Central Line	1802 March 4 at 06:29:07.6 UTC
Last Umbral External Contact	1802 March 4 at 06:30:14.9 UTC
Last Penumbral External Contact	1802 March 4 at 07:36:55.8 UTC

March 4, 1802 Solar Eclipse Parameters
Parameter	Value
Eclipse Magnitude	1.04283
Eclipse Obscuration	1.08750
Gamma	−0.69423
Sun Right Ascension	22h57m10.9s
Sun Declination	-06°42'08.1"
Sun Semi-Diameter	16'07.1"
Sun Equatorial Horizontal Parallax	08.9"
Moon Right Ascension	22h58m31.2s
Moon Declination	-07°19'20.7"
Moon Semi-Diameter	16'36.4"
Moon Equatorial Horizontal Parallax	1°00'56.8"
ΔT	12.7 s

== Eclipse season ==
This eclipse is part of an eclipse season, a period, roughly every six months, when eclipses occur. Only two (or occasionally three) eclipse seasons occur each year, and each season lasts about 35 days and repeats just short of six months (173 days) later; thus two full eclipse seasons always occur each year. Either two or three eclipses happen each eclipse season. In the sequence below, each eclipse is separated by a fortnight.

Eclipse season of March 1802
March 4 Ascending node (new moon)	March 19 Descending node (full moon)
Total solar eclipse Solar Saros 117	Partial lunar eclipse Lunar Saros 129

== Related eclipses ==
=== Eclipses in 1802 ===
- A total solar eclipse on March 4.
- A partial lunar eclipse on March 19.
- An annular solar eclipse on August 28.
- A partial lunar eclipse on September 11.

=== Metonic ===
- Preceded by: Solar eclipse of May 15, 1798
- Followed by: Solar eclipse of December 21, 1805

=== Tzolkinex ===
- Preceded by: Solar eclipse of January 21, 1795
- Followed by: Solar eclipse of April 14, 1809

=== Half-Saros ===
- Preceded by: Lunar eclipse of February 25, 1793
- Followed by: Lunar eclipse of March 10, 1811

=== Tritos ===
- Preceded by: Solar eclipse of April 3, 1791
- Followed by: Solar eclipse of February 1, 1813

=== Solar Saros 117 ===
- Preceded by: Solar eclipse of February 20, 1784
- Followed by: Solar eclipse of March 14, 1820

=== Inex ===
- Preceded by: Solar eclipse of March 23, 1773
- Followed by: Solar eclipse of February 12, 1831

=== Triad ===
- Preceded by: Solar eclipse of May 3, 1715
- Followed by: Solar eclipse of January 1, 1889

=== Solar eclipses of 1801–1805 ===
This eclipse is a member of a semester series. An eclipse in a semester series of solar eclipses repeats approximately every 177 days and 4 hours (a semester) at alternating nodes of the Moon's orbit.

The partial solar eclipses on April 13, 1801 and October 7, 1801 occur in the previous lunar year eclipse set, and the solar eclipses on January 1, 1805 (partial); June 26, 1805 (partial); and December 21, 1805 (annular) occur in the next lunar year eclipse set.

Solar eclipse series sets from 1801 to 1805
Ascending node			Descending node		
Saros	Map	Gamma	Saros	Map	Gamma
107	March 14, 1801 Partial	−1.4434	112	September 8, 1801 Partial	1.4657
117	March 4, 1802 Total	−0.6943	122	August 28, 1802 Annular	0.7569
127	February 21, 1803 Total	−0.0075	132	August 17, 1803 Annular	−0.0048
137	February 11, 1804 Hybrid	0.7053	142	August 5, 1804 Total	−0.7622
147	January 30, 1805 Partial	1.4651	152	July 26, 1805 Partial	−1.4571

=== Saros 117 ===
This eclipse is a part of Saros series 117, repeating every 18 years, 11 days, and containing 71 events. The series started with a partial solar eclipse on June 24, 792 AD. It contains annular eclipses from September 18, 936 AD through May 14, 1333; hybrid eclipses from May 25, 1351 through July 8, 1423; and total eclipses from July 18, 1441 through May 19, 1928. The series ends at member 71 as a partial eclipse on August 3, 2054. Its eclipses are tabulated in three columns; every third eclipse in the same column is one exeligmos apart, so they all cast shadows over approximately the same parts of the Earth.

The longest duration of annularity was produced by member 16 at 9 minutes, 26 seconds on December 3, 1062, and the longest duration of totality was produced by member 62 at 4 minutes, 19 seconds on April 26, 1892. All eclipses in this series occur at the Moon’s ascending node of orbit.

Series members 57–71 occur between 1801 and 2054:
57	58	59
March 4, 1802	March 14, 1820	March 25, 1838
60	61	62
April 5, 1856	April 16, 1874	April 26, 1892
63	64	65
May 9, 1910	May 19, 1928	May 30, 1946
66	67	68
June 10, 1964	June 21, 1982	July 1, 2000
69	70	71
July 13, 2018	July 23, 2036	August 3, 2054

=== Metonic series ===
The metonic series repeats eclipses every 19 years (6939.69 days), lasting about 5 cycles. Eclipses occur in nearly the same calendar date. In addition, the octon subseries repeats 1/5 of that or every 3.8 years (1387.94 days). All eclipses in this table occur at the Moon's descending node.

24 eclipse events between March 4, 1802 and July 28, 1870
March 4	December 20–21	October 8–9	July 27–28	May 15–16
117	119	121	123	125
March 4, 1802	December 21, 1805	October 9, 1809	July 27, 1813	May 16, 1817
127	129	131	133	135
March 4, 1821	December 20, 1824	October 9, 1828	July 27, 1832	May 15, 1836
137	139	141	143	145
March 4, 1840	December 21, 1843	October 9, 1847	July 28, 1851	May 16, 1855
147	149	151	153	
March 4, 1859	December 21, 1862	October 8, 1866	July 28, 1870	

=== Tritos series ===
This eclipse is a part of a tritos cycle, repeating at alternating nodes every 135 synodic months (≈ 3986.63 days, or 11 years minus 1 month). Their appearance and longitude are irregular due to a lack of synchronization with the anomalistic month (period of perigee), but groupings of 3 tritos cycles (≈ 33 years minus 3 months) come close (≈ 434.044 anomalistic months), so eclipses are similar in these groupings.

Series members between 1801 and 2200
March 4, 1802 (Saros 117)	February 1, 1813 (Saros 118)	January 1, 1824 (Saros 119)	November 30, 1834 (Saros 120)	October 30, 1845 (Saros 121)
September 29, 1856 (Saros 122)	August 29, 1867 (Saros 123)	July 29, 1878 (Saros 124)	June 28, 1889 (Saros 125)	May 28, 1900 (Saros 126)
April 28, 1911 (Saros 127)	March 28, 1922 (Saros 128)	February 24, 1933 (Saros 129)	January 25, 1944 (Saros 130)	December 25, 1954 (Saros 131)
November 23, 1965 (Saros 132)	October 23, 1976 (Saros 133)	September 23, 1987 (Saros 134)	August 22, 1998 (Saros 135)	July 22, 2009 (Saros 136)
June 21, 2020 (Saros 137)	May 21, 2031 (Saros 138)	April 20, 2042 (Saros 139)	March 20, 2053 (Saros 140)	February 17, 2064 (Saros 141)
January 16, 2075 (Saros 142)	December 16, 2085 (Saros 143)	November 15, 2096 (Saros 144)	October 16, 2107 (Saros 145)	September 15, 2118 (Saros 146)
August 15, 2129 (Saros 147)	July 14, 2140 (Saros 148)	June 14, 2151 (Saros 149)	May 14, 2162 (Saros 150)	April 12, 2173 (Saros 151)
March 12, 2184 (Saros 152)	February 10, 2195 (Saros 153)			

=== Inex series ===
This eclipse is a part of the long period inex cycle, repeating at alternating nodes, every 358 synodic months (≈ 10,571.95 days, or 29 years minus 20 days). Their appearance and longitude are irregular due to a lack of synchronization with the anomalistic month (period of perigee). However, groupings of 3 inex cycles (≈ 87 years minus 2 months) comes close (≈ 1,151.02 anomalistic months), so eclipses are similar in these groupings.

Series members between 1801 and 2200
March 4, 1802 (Saros 117)	February 12, 1831 (Saros 118)	January 23, 1860 (Saros 119)
January 1, 1889 (Saros 120)	December 14, 1917 (Saros 121)	November 23, 1946 (Saros 122)
November 3, 1975 (Saros 123)	October 14, 2004 (Saros 124)	September 23, 2033 (Saros 125)
September 3, 2062 (Saros 126)	August 15, 2091 (Saros 127)	July 25, 2120 (Saros 128)
July 5, 2149 (Saros 129)	June 16, 2178 (Saros 130)	

== See also ==
- List of solar eclipses in the 19th century
