= Solar eclipse of August 28, 1802 =

Annular Solar eclipse August 28, 180

- Annular eclipse
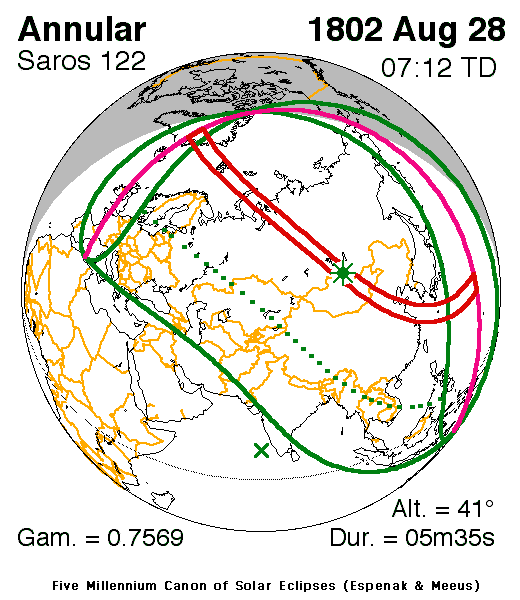
- Map
- Gamma: 0.7569
- Magnitude: 0.9367

Maximum eclipse
- Duration: 335 s (5 min 35 s)
- Coordinates: 51.3°N 105.7°E
- Max. width of band: 354 km (220 mi)

Times (UTC)
- Greatest eclipse: 7:12:00

References
- Saros: 122 (46 of 70)
- Catalog # (SE5000): 9046

An annular solar eclipse occurred at the Moon's descending node of orbit on Saturday, August 28, 1802, with a magnitude of 0.9367. A solar eclipse occurs when the Moon passes between Earth and the Sun, thereby totally or partly obscuring the image of the Sun for a viewer on Earth. An annular solar eclipse occurs when the Moon's apparent diameter is smaller than the Sun's, blocking most of the Sun's light and causing the Sun to look like an annulus (ring). An annular eclipse appears as a partial eclipse over a region of the Earth thousands of kilometres wide. Occurring only about 3 hours after apogee (on August 28, 1802, at 4:30 UTC), the Moon's apparent diameter was smaller.

The path of annularity was visible from parts of modern-day Greenland, Svalbard, Russia, Mongolia, China, and the Ryukyu Islands. A partial solar eclipse was also visible for parts of Greenland, northern Canada, Europe, Asia, and western Alaska.

== Eclipse details ==
Shown below are two tables displaying details about this particular solar eclipse. The first table outlines times at which the Moon's penumbra or umbra attains the specific parameter, and the second table describes various other parameters pertaining to this eclipse.

August 28, 1802 Solar Eclipse Times
Event	Time (UTC)
First Penumbral External Contact	1802 August 28 at 04:29:10.1 UTC
First Umbral External Contact	1802 August 28 at 05:51:01.7 UTC
First Central Line	1802 August 28 at 05:54:53.7 UTC
First Umbral Internal Contact	1802 August 28 at 05:58:52.8 UTC
Equatorial Conjunction	1802 August 28 at 06:26:04.0 UTC
Ecliptic Conjunction	1802 August 28 at 07:02:59.7 UTC
Greatest Duration	1802 August 28 at 07:06:10.3 UTC
Greatest Eclipse	1802 August 28 at 07:11:59.6 UTC
Last Umbral Internal Contact	1802 August 28 at 08:25:35.5 UTC
Last Central Line	1802 August 28 at 08:29:33.9 UTC
Last Umbral External Contact	1802 August 28 at 08:33:25.4 UTC
Last Penumbral External Contact	1802 August 28 at 09:55:07.2 UTC

August 28, 1802 Solar Eclipse Parameters
Parameter	Value
Eclipse Magnitude	0.93666
Eclipse Obscuration	0.87733
Gamma	0.75685
Sun Right Ascension	10h24m22.1s
Sun Declination	+09°58'43.3"
Sun Semi-Diameter	15'50.6"
Sun Equatorial Horizontal Parallax	08.7"
Moon Right Ascension	10h25m37.4s
Moon Declination	+10°34'58.3"
Moon Semi-Diameter	14'41.9"
Moon Equatorial Horizontal Parallax	0°53'56.6"
ΔT	12.6 s

== Eclipse season ==
This eclipse is part of an eclipse season, a period, roughly every six months, when eclipses occur. Only two (or occasionally three) eclipse seasons occur each year, and each season lasts about 35 days and repeats just short of six months (173 days) later; thus two full eclipse seasons always occur each year. Either two or three eclipses happen each eclipse season. In the sequence below, each eclipse is separated by a fortnight.

Eclipse season of August–September 1802
August 28 Descending node (new moon)	September 11 Ascending node (full moon)
Annular solar eclipse Solar Saros 122	Partial lunar eclipse Lunar Saros 134

== Related eclipses ==
=== Eclipses in 1802 ===
- A total solar eclipse on March 4.
- A partial lunar eclipse on March 19.
- An annular solar eclipse on August 28.
- A partial lunar eclipse on September 11.

=== Metonic ===
- Preceded by: Solar eclipse of November 8, 1798
- Followed by: Solar eclipse of June 16, 1806

=== Tzolkinex ===
- Preceded by: Solar eclipse of July 16, 1795
- Followed by: Solar eclipse of October 9, 1809

=== Half-Saros ===
- Preceded by: Lunar eclipse of August 21, 1793
- Followed by: Lunar eclipse of September 2, 1811

=== Tritos ===
- Preceded by: Solar eclipse of September 27, 1791
- Followed by: Solar eclipse of July 27, 1813

=== Solar Saros 122 ===
- Preceded by: Solar eclipse of August 16, 1784
- Followed by: Solar eclipse of September 7, 1820

=== Inex ===
- Preceded by: Solar eclipse of September 16, 1773
- Followed by: Solar eclipse of August 7, 1831

=== Triad ===
- Preceded by: Solar eclipse of October 27, 1715
- Followed by: Solar eclipse of June 28, 1889

=== Solar eclipses of 1801–1805 ===
This eclipse is a member of a semester series. An eclipse in a semester series of solar eclipses repeats approximately every 177 days and 4 hours (a semester) at alternating nodes of the Moon's orbit.

The partial solar eclipses on April 13, 1801 and October 7, 1801 occur in the previous lunar year eclipse set, and the solar eclipses on January 1, 1805 (partial); June 26, 1805 (partial); and December 21, 1805 (annular) occur in the next lunar year eclipse set.

Solar eclipse series sets from 1801 to 1805
Ascending node			Descending node		
Saros	Map	Gamma	Saros	Map	Gamma
107	March 14, 1801 Partial	−1.4434	112	September 8, 1801 Partial	1.4657
117	March 4, 1802 Total	−0.6943	122	August 28, 1802 Annular	0.7569
127	February 21, 1803 Total	−0.0075	132	August 17, 1803 Annular	−0.0048
137	February 11, 1804 Hybrid	0.7053	142	August 5, 1804 Total	−0.7622
147	January 30, 1805 Partial	1.4651	152	July 26, 1805 Partial	−1.4571

=== Saros 122 ===
This eclipse is a part of Saros series 122, repeating every 18 years, 11 days, and containing 70 events. The series started with a partial solar eclipse on April 17, 991 AD. It contains total eclipses from July 12, 1135 through August 3, 1171; hybrid eclipses on August 13, 1189 and August 25, 1207; and annular eclipses from September 4, 1225 through October 10, 1874. The series ends at member 70 as a partial eclipse on May 17, 2235. Its eclipses are tabulated in three columns; every third eclipse in the same column is one exeligmos apart, so they all cast shadows over approximately the same parts of the Earth.

The longest duration of totality was produced by member 9 at 1 minutes, 25 seconds on July 12, 1135, and the longest duration of annularity was produced by member 50 at 6 minutes, 28 seconds on October 10, 1874. All eclipses in this series occur at the Moon’s descending node of orbit.

Series members 46–68 occur between 1801 and 2200:
46	47	48
August 28, 1802	September 7, 1820	September 18, 1838
49	50	51
September 29, 1856	October 10, 1874	October 20, 1892
52	53	54
November 2, 1910	November 12, 1928	November 23, 1946
55	56	57
December 4, 1964	December 15, 1982	December 25, 2000
58	59	60
January 6, 2019	January 16, 2037	January 27, 2055
61	62	63
February 7, 2073	February 18, 2091	March 1, 2109
64	65	66
March 13, 2127	March 23, 2145	April 3, 2163
67	68	
April 14, 2181	April 25, 2199	

=== Metonic series ===
The metonic series repeats eclipses every 19 years (6939.69 days), lasting about 5 cycles. Eclipses occur in nearly the same calendar date. In addition, the octon subseries repeats 1/5 of that or every 3.8 years (1387.94 days). All eclipses in this table occur at the Moon's descending node.

24 eclipse events between August 28, 1802, and August 28, 1859
August 27–28	June 16	April 3–4	January 20–21	November 9
122	124	126	128	130
August 28, 1802	June 16, 1806	April 4, 1810	January 21, 1814	November 9, 1817
132	134	136	138	140
August 27, 1821	June 16, 1825	April 3, 1829	January 20, 1833	November 9, 1836
142	144	146	148	150
August 27, 1840	June 16, 1844	April 3, 1848	January 21, 1852	November 9, 1855
152
August 28, 1859

=== Tritos series ===
This eclipse is a part of a tritos cycle, repeating at alternating nodes every 135 synodic months (≈ 3986.63 days, or 11 years minus 1 month). Their appearance and longitude are irregular due to a lack of synchronization with the anomalistic month (period of perigee), but groupings of 3 tritos cycles (≈ 33 years minus 3 months) come close (≈ 434.044 anomalistic months), so eclipses are similar in these groupings.

Series members between 1801 and 2200
August 28, 1802 (Saros 122)	July 27, 1813 (Saros 123)	June 26, 1824 (Saros 124)	May 27, 1835 (Saros 125)	April 25, 1846 (Saros 126)
March 25, 1857 (Saros 127)	February 23, 1868 (Saros 128)	January 22, 1879 (Saros 129)	December 22, 1889 (Saros 130)	November 22, 1900 (Saros 131)
October 22, 1911 (Saros 132)	September 21, 1922 (Saros 133)	August 21, 1933 (Saros 134)	July 20, 1944 (Saros 135)	June 20, 1955 (Saros 136)
May 20, 1966 (Saros 137)	April 18, 1977 (Saros 138)	March 18, 1988 (Saros 139)	February 16, 1999 (Saros 140)	January 15, 2010 (Saros 141)
December 14, 2020 (Saros 142)	November 14, 2031 (Saros 143)	October 14, 2042 (Saros 144)	September 12, 2053 (Saros 145)	August 12, 2064 (Saros 146)
July 13, 2075 (Saros 147)	June 11, 2086 (Saros 148)	May 11, 2097 (Saros 149)	April 11, 2108 (Saros 150)	March 11, 2119 (Saros 151)
February 8, 2130 (Saros 152)	January 8, 2141 (Saros 153)	December 8, 2151 (Saros 154)	November 7, 2162 (Saros 155)	October 7, 2173 (Saros 156)
September 4, 2184 (Saros 157)	August 5, 2195 (Saros 158)			

=== Inex series ===
This eclipse is a part of the long period inex cycle, repeating at alternating nodes, every 358 synodic months (≈ 10,571.95 days, or 29 years minus 20 days). Their appearance and longitude are irregular due to a lack of synchronization with the anomalistic month (period of perigee). However, groupings of 3 inex cycles (≈ 87 years minus 2 months) comes close (≈ 1,151.02 anomalistic months), so eclipses are similar in these groupings.

Series members between 1801 and 2200
August 28, 1802 (Saros 122)	August 7, 1831 (Saros 123)	July 18, 1860 (Saros 124)
June 28, 1889 (Saros 125)	June 8, 1918 (Saros 126)	May 20, 1947 (Saros 127)
April 29, 1976 (Saros 128)	April 8, 2005 (Saros 129)	March 20, 2034 (Saros 130)
February 28, 2063 (Saros 131)	February 7, 2092 (Saros 132)	January 19, 2121 (Saros 133)
December 30, 2149 (Saros 134)	December 9, 2178 (Saros 135)	

== See also ==
- List of solar eclipses in the 19th century
