= Solar eclipse of August 17, 1803 =

Annular Solar eclipse August 17, 1803

- Annular eclipse
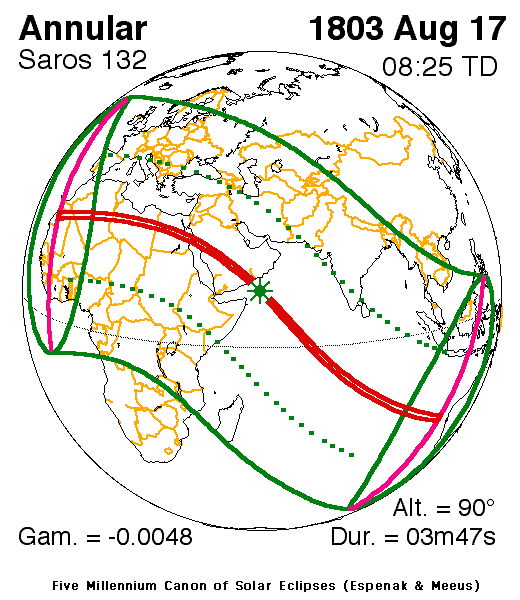
- Map
- Gamma: −0.0048
- Magnitude: 0.9657

Maximum eclipse
- Duration: 227 s (3 min 47 s)
- Coordinates: 13.6°N 54.7°E
- Max. width of band: 124 km (77 mi)

Times (UTC)
- Greatest eclipse: 8:25:03

References
- Saros: 132 (34 of 71)
- Catalog # (SE5000): 9048

An annular solar eclipse occurred at the Moon's descending node of orbit on Wednesday, August 17, 1803, with a magnitude of 0.9657. A solar eclipse occurs when the Moon passes between Earth and the Sun, thereby totally or partly obscuring the image of the Sun for a viewer on Earth. An annular solar eclipse occurs when the Moon's apparent diameter is smaller than the Sun's, blocking most of the Sun's light and causing the Sun to look like an annulus (ring). An annular eclipse appears as a partial eclipse over a region of the Earth thousands of kilometres wide. Occurring about 4.5 days before apogee (on August 21, 1803, at 19:20 UTC), the Moon's apparent diameter was smaller.

The path of annularity was visible from parts of modern-day Western Sahara, Mauritania, far northern Mali, Algeria, Libya, Egypt, Saudi Arabia, and Yemen. A partial solar eclipse was also visible for parts of Europe, North Africa, Central Africa, the Middle East, South Asia, and Southeast Asia. It was the first solar eclipse to be subject to detailed spectroscopic study.

== Eclipse details ==
Shown below are two tables displaying details about this particular solar eclipse. The first table outlines times at which the Moon's penumbra or umbra attains the specific parameter, and the second table describes various other parameters pertaining to this eclipse.

August 17, 1803 Solar Eclipse Times
Event	Time (UTC)
First Penumbral External Contact	1803 August 17 at 05:24:35.4 UTC
First Umbral External Contact	1803 August 17 at 06:27:46.8 UTC
First Central Line	1803 August 17 at 06:29:24.5 UTC
First Umbral Internal Contact	1803 August 17 at 06:31:02.3 UTC
First Penumbral Internal Contact	1803 August 17 at 07:34:15.4 UTC
Greatest Duration	1803 August 17 at 07:56:21.3 UTC
Greatest Eclipse	1803 August 17 at 08:25:03.0 UTC
Ecliptic Conjunction	1803 August 17 at 08:25:06.3 UTC
Equatorial Conjunction	1803 August 17 at 08:25:18.6 UTC
Last Penumbral Internal Contact	1803 August 17 at 09:15:49.4 UTC
Last Umbral Internal Contact	1803 August 17 at 10:19:01.8 UTC
Last Central Line	1803 August 17 at 10:20:42.0 UTC
Last Umbral External Contact	1803 August 17 at 10:22:22.3 UTC
Last Penumbral External Contact	1803 August 17 at 11:25:36.2 UTC

August 17, 1803 Solar Eclipse Parameters
Parameter	Value
Eclipse Magnitude	0.96571
Eclipse Obscuration	0.93259
Gamma	−0.00483
Sun Right Ascension	09h43m00.2s
Sun Declination	+13°43'47.1"
Sun Semi-Diameter	15'48.3"
Sun Equatorial Horizontal Parallax	08.7"
Moon Right Ascension	09h42m59.7s
Moon Declination	+13°43'32.7"
Moon Semi-Diameter	15'01.8"
Moon Equatorial Horizontal Parallax	0°55'09.5"
ΔT	12.4 s

== Eclipse season ==
This eclipse is part of an eclipse season, a period, roughly every six months, when eclipses occur. Only two (or occasionally three) eclipse seasons occur each year, and each season lasts about 35 days and repeats just short of six months (173 days) later; thus two full eclipse seasons always occur each year. Either two or three eclipses happen each eclipse season. In the sequence below, each eclipse is separated by a fortnight. The first and last eclipse in this sequence is separated by one synodic month.

Eclipse season of August–September 1803
August 3 Ascending node (full moon)	August 17 Descending node (new moon)	September 1 Ascending node (full moon)
Penumbral lunar eclipse Lunar Saros 106	Annular solar eclipse Solar Saros 132	Penumbral lunar eclipse Lunar Saros 144

== Related eclipses ==
=== Eclipses in 1803 ===
- A penumbral lunar eclipse on February 6.
- A total solar eclipse on February 21.
- A penumbral lunar eclipse on March 8.
- A penumbral lunar eclipse on August 3.
- An annular solar eclipse on August 17.
- A penumbral lunar eclipse on September 1.

=== Metonic ===
- Preceded by: Solar eclipse of October 28, 1799
- Followed by: Solar eclipse of June 6, 1807

=== Tzolkinex ===
- Preceded by: Solar eclipse of July 4, 1796
- Followed by: Solar eclipse of September 28, 1810

=== Half-Saros ===
- Preceded by: Lunar eclipse of August 11, 1794
- Followed by: Lunar eclipse of August 22, 1812

=== Tritos ===
- Preceded by: Solar eclipse of September 16, 1792
- Followed by: Solar eclipse of July 17, 1814

=== Solar Saros 132 ===
- Preceded by: Solar eclipse of August 5, 1785
- Followed by: Solar eclipse of August 27, 1821

=== Inex ===
- Preceded by: Solar eclipse of September 6, 1774
- Followed by: Solar eclipse of July 27, 1832

=== Triad ===
- Preceded by: Solar eclipse of October 15, 1716
- Followed by: Solar eclipse of June 17, 1890

=== Solar eclipses of 1801–1805 ===
This eclipse is a member of a semester series. An eclipse in a semester series of solar eclipses repeats approximately every 177 days and 4 hours (a semester) at alternating nodes of the Moon's orbit.

The partial solar eclipses on April 13, 1801 and October 7, 1801 occur in the previous lunar year eclipse set, and the solar eclipses on January 1, 1805 (partial); June 26, 1805 (partial); and December 21, 1805 (annular) occur in the next lunar year eclipse set.

Solar eclipse series sets from 1801 to 1805
Ascending node			Descending node		
Saros	Map	Gamma	Saros	Map	Gamma
107	March 14, 1801 Partial	−1.4434	112	September 8, 1801 Partial	1.4657
117	March 4, 1802 Total	−0.6943	122	August 28, 1802 Annular	0.7569
127	February 21, 1803 Total	−0.0075	132	August 17, 1803 Annular	−0.0048
137	February 11, 1804 Hybrid	0.7053	142	August 5, 1804 Total	−0.7622
147	January 30, 1805 Partial	1.4651	152	July 26, 1805 Partial	−1.4571

=== Saros 132 ===
This eclipse is a part of Saros series 132, repeating every 18 years, 11 days, and containing 71 events. The series started with a partial solar eclipse on August 13, 1208. It contains annular eclipses from March 17, 1569 through March 12, 2146; hybrid eclipses on March 23, 2164 and April 3, 2182; and total eclipses from April 14, 2200 through June 19, 2308. The series ends at member 71 as a partial eclipse on September 25, 2470. Its eclipses are tabulated in three columns; every third eclipse in the same column is one exeligmos apart, so they all cast shadows over approximately the same parts of the Earth.

The longest duration of annularity was produced by member 25 at 6 minutes, 56 seconds on May 9, 1641, and the longest duration of totality will be produced by member 61 at 2 minutes, 14 seconds on June 8, 2290. All eclipses in this series occur at the Moon’s descending node of orbit.

Series members 34–56 occur between 1801 and 2200:
34	35	36
August 17, 1803	August 27, 1821	September 7, 1839
37	38	39
September 18, 1857	September 29, 1875	October 9, 1893
40	41	42
October 22, 1911	November 1, 1929	November 12, 1947
43	44	45
November 23, 1965	December 4, 1983	December 14, 2001
46	47	48
December 26, 2019	January 5, 2038	January 16, 2056
49	50	51
January 27, 2074	February 7, 2092	February 18, 2110
52	53	54
March 1, 2128	March 12, 2146	March 23, 2164
55	56	
April 3, 2182	April 14, 2200	

=== Metonic series ===
The metonic series repeats eclipses every 19 years (6939.69 days), lasting about 5 cycles. Eclipses occur in nearly the same calendar date. In addition, the octon subseries repeats 1/5 of that or every 3.8 years (1387.94 days). All eclipses in this table occur at the Moon's descending node.

24 eclipse events between August 17, 1803 and August 16, 1841
August 16–17	June 5–6	March 24	January 9–10	October 29
132	134	136	138	140
August 17, 1803	June 6, 1807	March 24, 1811	January 10, 1815	October 29, 1818
142	144	146	148	150
August 16, 1822	June 5, 1826	March 24, 1830	January 9, 1834	October 29, 1837
152
August 16, 1841

=== Tritos series ===
This eclipse is a part of a tritos cycle, repeating at alternating nodes every 135 synodic months (≈ 3986.63 days, or 11 years minus 1 month). Their appearance and longitude are irregular due to a lack of synchronization with the anomalistic month (period of perigee), but groupings of 3 tritos cycles (≈ 33 years minus 3 months) come close (≈ 434.044 anomalistic months), so eclipses are similar in these groupings.

Series members between 1801 and 2087
August 17, 1803 (Saros 132)	July 17, 1814 (Saros 133)	June 16, 1825 (Saros 134)	May 15, 1836 (Saros 135)	April 15, 1847 (Saros 136)
March 15, 1858 (Saros 137)	February 11, 1869 (Saros 138)	January 11, 1880 (Saros 139)	December 12, 1890 (Saros 140)	November 11, 1901 (Saros 141)
October 10, 1912 (Saros 142)	September 10, 1923 (Saros 143)	August 10, 1934 (Saros 144)	July 9, 1945 (Saros 145)	June 8, 1956 (Saros 146)
May 9, 1967 (Saros 147)	April 7, 1978 (Saros 148)	March 7, 1989 (Saros 149)	February 5, 2000 (Saros 150)	January 4, 2011 (Saros 151)
December 4, 2021 (Saros 152)	November 3, 2032 (Saros 153)	October 3, 2043 (Saros 154)	September 2, 2054 (Saros 155)	August 2, 2065 (Saros 156)
July 1, 2076 (Saros 157)	June 1, 2087 (Saros 158)			

=== Inex series ===
This eclipse is a part of the long period inex cycle, repeating at alternating nodes, every 358 synodic months (≈ 10,571.95 days, or 29 years minus 20 days). Their appearance and longitude are irregular due to a lack of synchronization with the anomalistic month (period of perigee). However, groupings of 3 inex cycles (≈ 87 years minus 2 months) comes close (≈ 1,151.02 anomalistic months), so eclipses are similar in these groupings.

Series members between 1801 and 2200
August 17, 1803 (Saros 132)	July 27, 1832 (Saros 133)	July 8, 1861 (Saros 134)
June 17, 1890 (Saros 135)	May 29, 1919 (Saros 136)	May 9, 1948 (Saros 137)
April 18, 1977 (Saros 138)	March 29, 2006 (Saros 139)	March 9, 2035 (Saros 140)
February 17, 2064 (Saros 141)	January 27, 2093 (Saros 142)	January 8, 2122 (Saros 143)
December 19, 2150 (Saros 144)	November 28, 2179 (Saros 145)	

== See also ==
- List of solar eclipses in the 19th century
