= Solar eclipse of December 27, 2084 =

Total eclipse

- Total eclipse
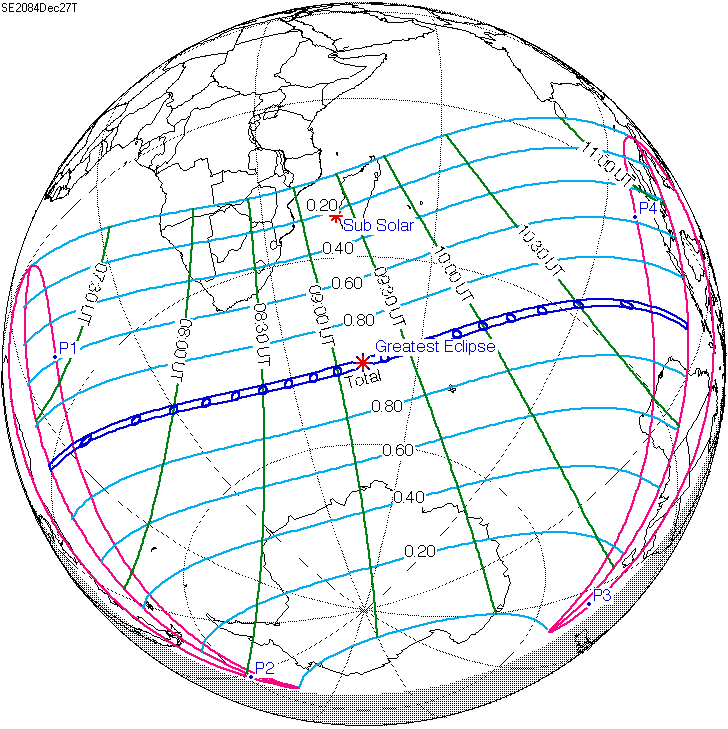
- Map
- Gamma: −0.4094
- Magnitude: 1.0396

Maximum eclipse
- Duration: 184 s (3 min 4 s)
- Coordinates: 47.3°S 47.7°E
- Max. width of band: 146 km (91 mi)

Times (UTC)
- Greatest eclipse: 9:13:48

References
- Saros: 133 (49 of 72)
- Catalog # (SE5000): 9698

A total solar eclipse will occur at the Moon's ascending node of orbit on Wednesday, December 27, 2084, with a magnitude of 1.0396. A solar eclipse occurs when the Moon passes between Earth and the Sun, thereby totally or partly obscuring the image of the Sun for a viewer on Earth. A total solar eclipse occurs when the Moon's apparent diameter is larger than the Sun's, blocking all direct sunlight, turning day into darkness. Totality occurs in a narrow path across Earth's surface, with the partial solar eclipse visible over a surrounding region thousands of kilometres wide. Occurring about 21 hours before perigee (on December 28, 2084, at 6:00 UTC), the Moon's apparent diameter will be larger.

The path of totality will be visible from parts of the Crozet Islands. A partial solar eclipse will also be visible for parts of Southern Africa, Antarctica, and Australia.

== Eclipse details ==
Shown below are two tables displaying details about this particular solar eclipse. The first table outlines times at which the Moon's penumbra or umbra attains the specific parameter, and the second table describes various other parameters pertaining to this eclipse.

December 27, 2084 Solar Eclipse Times
Event	Time (UTC)
First Penumbral External Contact	2084 December 27 at 06:40:00.9 UTC
First Umbral External Contact	2084 December 27 at 07:38:40.8 UTC
First Central Line	2084 December 27 at 07:39:22.1 UTC
First Umbral Internal Contact	2084 December 27 at 07:40:03.4 UTC
First Penumbral Internal Contact	2084 December 27 at 08:52:40.6 UTC
Equatorial Conjunction	2084 December 27 at 09:07:27.5 UTC
Ecliptic Conjunction	2084 December 27 at 09:09:35.4 UTC
Greatest Duration	2084 December 27 at 09:12:49.1 UTC
Greatest Eclipse	2084 December 27 at 09:13:48.0 UTC
Last Penumbral Internal Contact	2084 December 27 at 09:35:05.2 UTC
Last Umbral Internal Contact	2084 December 27 at 10:47:35.5 UTC
Last Central Line	2084 December 27 at 10:48:17.9 UTC
Last Umbral External Contact	2084 December 27 at 10:49:00.2 UTC
Last Penumbral External Contact	2084 December 27 at 11:47:35.5 UTC

December 27, 2084 Solar Eclipse Parameters
Parameter	Value
Eclipse Magnitude	1.03962
Eclipse Obscuration	1.08082
Gamma	−0.40944
Sun Right Ascension	18h28m34.2s
Sun Declination	-23°15'58.0"
Sun Semi-Diameter	16'15.7"
Sun Equatorial Horizontal Parallax	08.9"
Moon Right Ascension	18h28m50.3s
Moon Declination	-23°40'38.6"
Moon Semi-Diameter	16'38.7"
Moon Equatorial Horizontal Parallax	1°01'05.5"
ΔT	109.7 s

== Eclipse season ==
This eclipse is part of an eclipse season, a period, roughly every six months, when eclipses occur. Only two (or occasionally three) eclipse seasons occur each year, and each season lasts about 35 days and repeats just short of six months (173 days) later; thus two full eclipse seasons always occur each year. Either two or three eclipses happen each eclipse season. In the sequence below, each eclipse is separated by a fortnight.

Eclipse season of December 2084–January 2085
December 27 Ascending node (new moon)	January 10 Descending node (full moon)
Total solar eclipse Solar Saros 133	Penumbral lunar eclipse Lunar Saros 145

== Related eclipses ==
=== Eclipses in 2084 ===
- A partial solar eclipse on January 7.
- A total lunar eclipse on January 22.
- An annular solar eclipse on July 3.
- A partial lunar eclipse on July 17.
- A total solar eclipse on December 27.

=== Metonic ===
- Preceded by: Solar eclipse of March 10, 2081
- Followed by: Solar eclipse of October 14, 2088

=== Tzolkinex ===
- Preceded by: Solar eclipse of November 15, 2077
- Followed by: Solar eclipse of February 7, 2092

=== Half-Saros ===
- Preceded by: Lunar eclipse of December 22, 2075
- Followed by: Lunar eclipse of January 1, 2094

=== Tritos ===
- Preceded by: Solar eclipse of January 27, 2074
- Followed by: Solar eclipse of November 27, 2095

=== Solar Saros 133 ===
- Preceded by: Solar eclipse of December 17, 2066
- Followed by: Solar eclipse of January 8, 2103

=== Inex ===
- Preceded by: Solar eclipse of January 16, 2056
- Followed by: Solar eclipse of December 8, 2113

=== Triad ===
- Preceded by: Solar eclipse of February 26, 1998
- Followed by: Solar eclipse of October 29, 2171

=== Solar eclipses of 2083–2087 ===
This eclipse is a member of a semester series. An eclipse in a semester series of solar eclipses repeats approximately every 177 days and 4 hours (a semester) at alternating nodes of the Moon's orbit.

The partial solar eclipses on February 16, 2083 and August 13, 2083 occur in the previous lunar year eclipse set, and the partial solar eclipses on May 2, 2087 and October 26, 2087 occur in the next lunar year eclipse set.

Solar eclipse series sets from 2083 to 2087
Descending node			Ascending node		
Saros	Map	Gamma	Saros	Map	Gamma
118	July 15, 2083 Partial	1.5465	123	January 7, 2084 Partial	−1.0715
128	July 3, 2084 Annular	0.8208	133	December 27, 2084 Total	−0.4094
138	June 22, 2085 Annular	0.0452	143	December 16, 2085 Annular	0.2786
148	June 11, 2086 Total	−0.7215	153	December 6, 2086 Partial	1.0194
158	June 1, 2087 Partial	−1.4186			

=== Saros 133 ===
This eclipse is a part of Saros series 133, repeating every 18 years, 11 days, and containing 72 events. The series started with a partial solar eclipse on July 13, 1219. It contains annular eclipses from November 20, 1435 through January 13, 1526; a hybrid eclipse on January 24, 1544; and total eclipses from February 3, 1562 through June 21, 2373. The series ends at member 72 as a partial eclipse on September 5, 2499. Its eclipses are tabulated in three columns; every third eclipse in the same column is one exeligmos apart, so they all cast shadows over approximately the same parts of the Earth.

The longest duration of annularity was produced by member 25 at 1 minutes, 14 seconds on November 30, 1453, and the longest duration of totality was produced by member 61 at 6 minutes, 50 seconds on August 7, 1850. All eclipses in this series occur at the Moon’s ascending node of orbit.

Series members 34–55 occur between 1801 and 2200:
34	35	36
July 17, 1814	July 27, 1832	August 7, 1850
37	38	39
August 18, 1868	August 29, 1886	September 9, 1904
40	41	42
September 21, 1922	October 1, 1940	October 12, 1958
43	44	45
October 23, 1976	November 3, 1994	November 13, 2012
46	47	48
November 25, 2030	December 5, 2048	December 17, 2066
49	50	51
December 27, 2084	January 8, 2103	January 19, 2121
52	53	54
January 30, 2139	February 9, 2157	February 21, 2175
55
March 3, 2193

=== Metonic series ===
The metonic series repeats eclipses every 19 years (6939.69 days), lasting about 5 cycles. Eclipses occur in nearly the same calendar date. In addition, the octon subseries repeats 1/5 of that or every 3.8 years (1387.94 days). All eclipses in this table occur at the Moon's ascending node.

23 eclipse events between August 3, 2054 and October 16, 2145
August 3–4	May 22–24	March 10–11	December 27–29	October 14–16
117	119	121	123	125
August 3, 2054	May 22, 2058	March 11, 2062	December 27, 2065	October 15, 2069
127	129	131	133	135
August 3, 2073	May 22, 2077	March 10, 2081	December 27, 2084	October 14, 2088
137	139	141	143	145
August 3, 2092	May 22, 2096	March 10, 2100	December 29, 2103	October 16, 2107
147	149	151	153	155
August 4, 2111	May 24, 2115	March 11, 2119	December 28, 2122	October 16, 2126
157	159	161	163	165
August 4, 2130	May 23, 2134			October 16, 2145

=== Tritos series ===
This eclipse is a part of a tritos cycle, repeating at alternating nodes every 135 synodic months (≈ 3986.63 days, or 11 years minus 1 month). Their appearance and longitude are irregular due to a lack of synchronization with the anomalistic month (period of perigee), but groupings of 3 tritos cycles (≈ 33 years minus 3 months) come close (≈ 434.044 anomalistic months), so eclipses are similar in these groupings.

Series members between 1801 and 2200
March 14, 1801 (Saros 107)	February 12, 1812 (Saros 108)	January 12, 1823 (Saros 109)		November 10, 1844 (Saros 111)
		August 9, 1877 (Saros 114)	July 9, 1888 (Saros 115)	June 8, 1899 (Saros 116)
May 9, 1910 (Saros 117)	April 8, 1921 (Saros 118)	March 7, 1932 (Saros 119)	February 4, 1943 (Saros 120)	January 5, 1954 (Saros 121)
December 4, 1964 (Saros 122)	November 3, 1975 (Saros 123)	October 3, 1986 (Saros 124)	September 2, 1997 (Saros 125)	August 1, 2008 (Saros 126)
July 2, 2019 (Saros 127)	June 1, 2030 (Saros 128)	April 30, 2041 (Saros 129)	March 30, 2052 (Saros 130)	February 28, 2063 (Saros 131)
January 27, 2074 (Saros 132)	December 27, 2084 (Saros 133)	November 27, 2095 (Saros 134)	October 26, 2106 (Saros 135)	September 26, 2117 (Saros 136)
August 25, 2128 (Saros 137)	July 25, 2139 (Saros 138)	June 25, 2150 (Saros 139)	May 25, 2161 (Saros 140)	April 23, 2172 (Saros 141)
March 23, 2183 (Saros 142)	February 21, 2194 (Saros 143)			

=== Inex series ===
This eclipse is a part of the long period inex cycle, repeating at alternating nodes, every 358 synodic months (≈ 10,571.95 days, or 29 years minus 20 days). Their appearance and longitude are irregular due to a lack of synchronization with the anomalistic month (period of perigee). However, groupings of 3 inex cycles (≈ 87 years minus 2 months) comes close (≈ 1,151.02 anomalistic months), so eclipses are similar in these groupings.

Series members between 1801 and 2200
June 26, 1824 (Saros 124)	June 6, 1853 (Saros 125)	May 17, 1882 (Saros 126)
April 28, 1911 (Saros 127)	April 7, 1940 (Saros 128)	March 18, 1969 (Saros 129)
February 26, 1998 (Saros 130)	February 6, 2027 (Saros 131)	January 16, 2056 (Saros 132)
December 27, 2084 (Saros 133)	December 8, 2113 (Saros 134)	November 17, 2142 (Saros 135)
October 29, 2171 (Saros 136)	October 9, 2200 (Saros 137)	
