= Solar eclipse of September 8, 1801 =

Partial solar eclipse September 8, 1801

- Partial eclipse
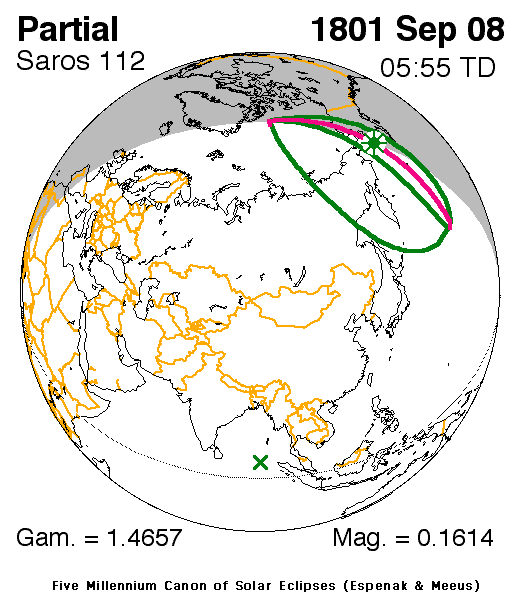
- Map
- Gamma: 1.4657
- Magnitude: 0.1614

Maximum eclipse
- Coordinates: 61.1°N 168.5°W

Times (UTC)
- Greatest eclipse: 5:54:40

References
- Saros: 112 (71 of 72)
- Catalog # (SE5000): 9044

A partial solar eclipse occurred at the Moon's descending node of orbit on Tuesday, September 8, 1801, with a magnitude of 0.1614. A solar eclipse occurs when the Moon passes between Earth and the Sun, thereby totally or partly obscuring the image of the Sun for a viewer on Earth. A partial solar eclipse occurs in the polar regions of the Earth when the center of the Moon's shadow misses the Earth.

The partial solar eclipse was visible for parts of modern-day eastern Russia and western Alaska.

== Eclipse details ==
Shown below are two tables displaying details about this particular solar eclipse. The first table outlines times at which the Moon's penumbra or umbra attains the specific parameter, and the second table describes various other parameters pertaining to this eclipse.

September 8, 1801 Solar Eclipse Times
Event	Time (UTC)
Equatorial Conjunction	1801 September 8 at 04:23:25.3 UTC
First Penumbral External Contact	1801 September 8 at 04:53:32.8 UTC
Ecliptic Conjunction	1801 September 8 at 05:38:08.2 UTC
Greatest Eclipse	1801 September 8 at 05:54:39.3 UTC
Last Penumbral External Contact	1801 September 8 at 06:56:17.9 UTC

September 8, 1801 Solar Eclipse Parameters
Parameter	Value
Eclipse Magnitude	0.16147
Eclipse Obscuration	0.07489
Gamma	1.46568
Sun Right Ascension	11h04m58.3s
Sun Declination	+05°53'39.8"
Sun Semi-Diameter	15'53.2"
Sun Equatorial Horizontal Parallax	08.7"
Moon Right Ascension	11h07m32.9s
Moon Declination	+07°04'46.3"
Moon Semi-Diameter	15'03.7"
Moon Equatorial Horizontal Parallax	0°55'16.6"
ΔT	12.8 s

== Eclipse season ==
This eclipse is part of an eclipse season, a period, roughly every six months, when eclipses occur. Only two (or occasionally three) eclipse seasons occur each year, and each season lasts about 35 days and repeats just short of six months (173 days) later; thus two full eclipse seasons always occur each year. Either two or three eclipses happen each eclipse season. In the sequence below, each eclipse is separated by a fortnight. The first and last eclipse in this sequence is separated by one synodic month.

Eclipse season of September–October 1801
September 8 Descending node (new moon)	September 22 Ascending node (full moon)	October 7 Descending node (new moon)
Partial solar eclipse Solar Saros 112	Total lunar eclipse Lunar Saros 124	Partial solar eclipse Solar Saros 150

== Related eclipses ==
=== Eclipses in 1801 ===
- A partial solar eclipse on March 14.
- A total lunar eclipse on March 30.
- A partial solar eclipse on April 13.
- A partial solar eclipse on September 8.
- A total lunar eclipse on September 22.
- A partial solar eclipse on October 7.

=== Metonic ===
- Followed by: Solar eclipse of June 26, 1805

=== Tzolkinex ===
- Preceded by: Solar eclipse of July 26, 1794
- Followed by: Solar eclipse of October 19, 1808

=== Half-Saros ===
- Preceded by: Lunar eclipse of August 31, 1792
- Followed by: Lunar eclipse of September 13, 1810

=== Tritos ===
- Preceded by: Solar eclipse of October 8, 1790
- Followed by: Solar eclipse of August 7, 1812

=== Solar Saros 112 ===
- Preceded by: Solar eclipse of August 27, 1783
- Followed by: Solar eclipse of September 19, 1819

=== Inex ===
- Preceded by: Solar eclipse of September 27, 1772
- Followed by: Solar eclipse of August 18, 1830

=== Triad ===
- Preceded by: Solar eclipse of November 7, 1714
- Followed by: Solar eclipse of July 9, 1888

=== Solar eclipses of 1801–1805 ===
This eclipse is a member of a semester series. An eclipse in a semester series of solar eclipses repeats approximately every 177 days and 4 hours (a semester) at alternating nodes of the Moon's orbit.

The partial solar eclipses on April 13, 1801 and October 7, 1801 occur in the previous lunar year eclipse set, and the solar eclipses on January 1, 1805 (partial); June 26, 1805 (partial); and December 21, 1805 (annular) occur in the next lunar year eclipse set.

Solar eclipse series sets from 1801 to 1805
Ascending node			Descending node		
Saros	Map	Gamma	Saros	Map	Gamma
107	March 14, 1801 Partial	−1.4434	112	September 8, 1801 Partial	1.4657
117	March 4, 1802 Total	−0.6943	122	August 28, 1802 Annular	0.7569
127	February 21, 1803 Total	−0.0075	132	August 17, 1803 Annular	−0.0048
137	February 11, 1804 Hybrid	0.7053	142	August 5, 1804 Total	−0.7622
147	January 30, 1805 Partial	1.4651	152	July 26, 1805 Partial	−1.4571

=== Saros 112 ===
This eclipse is a part of Saros series 112, repeating every 18 years, 11 days, and containing 72 events. The series started with a partial solar eclipse on July 31, 539 AD. It contains total eclipses from March 15, 918 AD through November 18, 1332; hybrid eclipses from November 30, 1350 through April 29, 1585; and annular eclipses from May 11, 1603 through June 23, 1675. The series ends at member 72 as a partial eclipse on September 19, 1819. Its eclipses are tabulated in three columns; every third eclipse in the same column is one exeligmos apart, so they all cast shadows over approximately the same parts of the Earth.

The longest duration of totality was produced by member 30 at 7 minutes, 20 seconds on June 9, 1062, and the longest duration of annularity was produced by member 64 at 1 minute, 1 second on June 23, 1675. All eclipses in this series occur at the Moon’s descending node of orbit.

Series members 71–72 occur between 1801 and 1819:
71	72
September 8, 1801	September 19, 1819

=== Metonic series ===
The metonic series repeats eclipses every 19 years (6939.69 days), lasting about 5 cycles. Eclipses occur in nearly the same calendar date. In addition, the octon subseries repeats 1/5 of that or every 3.8 years (1387.94 days). All eclipses in this table occur at the Moon's descending node.

22 eclipse events between September 8, 1801 and September 7, 1877
September 7–8	June 26–27	April 14–15	January 31–February 1	November 19–20
112	114	116	118	120
September 8, 1801	June 26, 1805	April 14, 1809	February 1, 1813	November 19, 1816
122	124	126	128	130
September 7, 1820	June 26, 1824	April 14, 1828	February 1, 1832	November 20, 1835
132	134	136	138	140
September 7, 1839	June 27, 1843	April 15, 1847	February 1, 1851	November 20, 1854
142	144	146	148	150
September 7, 1858	June 27, 1862	April 15, 1866	January 31, 1870	November 20, 1873
152
September 7, 1877

=== Tritos series ===
This eclipse is a part of a tritos cycle, repeating at alternating nodes every 135 synodic months (≈ 3986.63 days, or 11 years minus 1 month). Their appearance and longitude are irregular due to a lack of synchronization with the anomalistic month (period of perigee), but groupings of 3 tritos cycles (≈ 33 years minus 3 months) come close (≈ 434.044 anomalistic months), so eclipses are similar in these groupings.

Series members between 1801 and 2200
September 8, 1801 (Saros 112)	August 7, 1812 (Saros 113)	July 8, 1823 (Saros 114)	June 7, 1834 (Saros 115)	May 6, 1845 (Saros 116)
April 5, 1856 (Saros 117)	March 6, 1867 (Saros 118)	February 2, 1878 (Saros 119)	January 1, 1889 (Saros 120)	December 3, 1899 (Saros 121)
November 2, 1910 (Saros 122)	October 1, 1921 (Saros 123)	August 31, 1932 (Saros 124)	August 1, 1943 (Saros 125)	June 30, 1954 (Saros 126)
May 30, 1965 (Saros 127)	April 29, 1976 (Saros 128)	March 29, 1987 (Saros 129)	February 26, 1998 (Saros 130)	January 26, 2009 (Saros 131)
December 26, 2019 (Saros 132)	November 25, 2030 (Saros 133)	October 25, 2041 (Saros 134)	September 22, 2052 (Saros 135)	August 24, 2063 (Saros 136)
July 24, 2074 (Saros 137)	June 22, 2085 (Saros 138)	May 22, 2096 (Saros 139)	April 23, 2107 (Saros 140)	March 22, 2118 (Saros 141)
February 18, 2129 (Saros 142)	January 20, 2140 (Saros 143)	December 19, 2150 (Saros 144)	November 17, 2161 (Saros 145)	October 17, 2172 (Saros 146)
September 16, 2183 (Saros 147)	August 16, 2194 (Saros 148)			

=== Inex series ===
This eclipse is a part of the long period inex cycle, repeating at alternating nodes, every 358 synodic months (≈ 10,571.95 days, or 29 years minus 20 days). Their appearance and longitude are irregular due to a lack of synchronization with the anomalistic month (period of perigee). However, groupings of 3 inex cycles (≈ 87 years minus 2 months) comes close (≈ 1,151.02 anomalistic months), so eclipses are similar in these groupings.

Series members between 1801 and 2200
September 8, 1801 (Saros 112)	August 18, 1830 (Saros 113)	July 29, 1859 (Saros 114)
July 9, 1888 (Saros 115)	June 19, 1917 (Saros 116)	May 30, 1946 (Saros 117)
May 11, 1975 (Saros 118)	April 19, 2004 (Saros 119)	March 30, 2033 (Saros 120)
March 11, 2062 (Saros 121)	February 18, 2091 (Saros 122)	January 30, 2120 (Saros 123)
January 9, 2149 (Saros 124)	December 20, 2177 (Saros 125)	

== See also ==
- List of solar eclipses in the 19th century
