= Solar eclipse of September 14, 2099 =

Total eclipse

- Total eclipse
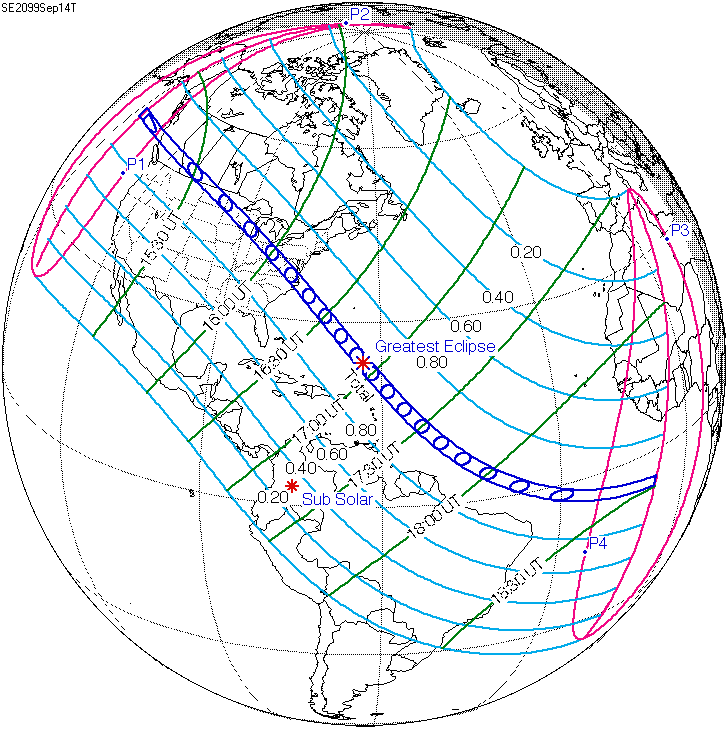
- Map
- Gamma: 0.3942
- Magnitude: 1.0684

Maximum eclipse
- Duration: 318 s (5 min 18 s)
- Coordinates: 23.4°N 62.8°W
- Max. width of band: 241 km (150 mi)

Times (UTC)
- Greatest eclipse: 16:57:53

References
- Saros: 136 (42 of 71)
- Catalog # (SE5000): 9732

A total solar eclipse will occur at the Moon's descending node of orbit on Monday, September 14, 2099, with a magnitude of 1.0684. A solar eclipse occurs when the Moon passes between Earth and the Sun, thereby totally or partly obscuring the image of the Sun for a viewer on Earth. A total solar eclipse occurs when the Moon's apparent diameter is larger than the Sun's, blocking all direct sunlight, turning day into darkness. Totality occurs in a narrow path across Earth's surface, with the partial solar eclipse visible over a surrounding region thousands of kilometres wide. Occurring about 5 hours before perigee (on September 15, 2099, at 12:20 UTC), the Moon's apparent diameter will be larger.

== Locations experiencing totality ==
The eclipse will begin at sunrise off the western coast of Canada, and move eastern across Canada (British Columbia, Alberta, and Saskatchewan) and the northern states of the United States (Montana, North Dakota, South Dakota, Minnesota, Wisconsin, Illinois, Indiana, Michigan, Ohio, Pennsylvania, West Virginia, Maryland, Virginia and North Carolina). The eclipse will end in the Atlantic Ocean, with partial visibility in parts of Central America, the Caribbean, northern South America, the Iberian Peninsula, West Africa and throughout the entirety of North.

The path of totality will pass through the cities of Madison, Wisconsin, and Grand Rapids, Michigan. The last time totality was visible over these two locations was respectively May 16, 1379, and April 18, 1558.

=== British Columbia ===
- Williams Lake

=== Alberta ===
- Calgary
- Medicine Hat

=== Saskatchewan ===
- Swift Current

=== Montana ===
- Plentywood

=== North Dakota ===
- Williston
- Minot
- Fargo
- Grand Forks

=== Minnesota ===
- Saint Cloud
- Minneapolis
- Saint Paul

=== Wisconsin ===
- Eau Claire
- Wausau
- La Crosse
- Oshkosh
- Sheboygan
- Madison
- Janesville
- Milwaukee
- Kenosha

=== Illinois ===
- Chicago
- Waukegan
- Evanston

=== Michigan ===
- Grand Rapids
- Lansing
- Kalamazoo
- Ann Arbor

=== Indiana ===
- South Bend
- Fort Wayne

=== Ohio ===
- Toledo
- Lima
- Sandusky
- Mansfield
- Columbus
- Canton
- Zanesville

=== Pennsylvania ===
- Waynesburg

=== West Virginia ===
- Parkersburg
- Wheeling
- Clarksburg
- Morgantown
- Martinsburg

=== Virginia ===
- Staunton
- Harrisonburg
- Charlottesville
- Lynchburg
- Richmond
- Newport News
- Norfolk
- Virginia Beach

=== North Carolina ===
- Elizabeth City
- Kill Devil Hills
- Kitty Hawk
- Swan Quarter
- Washington

Although this solar eclipse does pass over a few large cities such as Minneapolis and Virginia Beach, it fails to offer totality in several major cities nearby, including most of Chicago and all of Washington D.C., Detroit, Cincinnati and Cleveland. Moreover, in Canada, the cities of Moose Jaw and Regina will be directly north of the path, but not in it.

== Eclipse details ==
Shown below are two tables displaying details about this particular solar eclipse. The first table outlines times at which the Moon's penumbra or umbra attains the specific parameter, and the second table describes various other parameters pertaining to this eclipse.

September 14, 2099 Solar Eclipse Times
Event	Time (UTC)
First Penumbral External Contact	2099 September 14 at 14:25:44.7 UTC
First Umbral External Contact	2099 September 14 at 15:22:08.5 UTC
First Central Line	2099 September 14 at 15:23:37.5 UTC
First Umbral Internal Contact	2099 September 14 at 15:25:06.8 UTC
First Penumbral Internal Contact	2099 September 14 at 16:32:45.5 UTC
Equatorial Conjunction	2099 September 14 at 16:35:31.9 UTC
Ecliptic Conjunction	2099 September 14 at 16:53:52.7 UTC
Greatest Duration	2099 September 14 at 16:56:49.2 UTC
Greatest Eclipse	2099 September 14 at 16:57:53.0 UTC
Last Penumbral Internal Contact	2099 September 14 at 17:23:30.3 UTC
Last Umbral Internal Contact	2099 September 14 at 18:30:52.9 UTC
Last Central Line	2099 September 14 at 18:32:22.2 UTC
Last Umbral External Contact	2099 September 14 at 18:33:51.3 UTC
Last Penumbral External Contact	2099 September 14 at 19:30:09.7 UTC

September 14, 2099 Solar Eclipse Parameters
Parameter	Value
Eclipse Magnitude	1.06844
Eclipse Obscuration	1.14156
Gamma	0.39422
Sun Right Ascension	11h31m25.7s
Sun Declination	+03°05'04.1"
Sun Semi-Diameter	15'53.8"
Sun Equatorial Horizontal Parallax	08.7"
Moon Right Ascension	11h32m12.4s
Moon Declination	+03°26'11.8"
Moon Semi-Diameter	16'43.1"
Moon Equatorial Horizontal Parallax	1°01'21.6"
ΔT	123.3 s

== Eclipse season ==
This eclipse is part of an eclipse season, a period, roughly every six months, when eclipses occur. Only two (or occasionally three) eclipse seasons occur each year, and each season lasts about 35 days and repeats just short of six months (173 days) later; thus two full eclipse seasons always occur each year. Either two or three eclipses happen each eclipse season. In the sequence below, each eclipse is separated by a fortnight.

Eclipse season of September 2099
September 14 Descending node (new moon)	September 29 Ascending node (full moon)
Total solar eclipse Solar Saros 136	Penumbral lunar eclipse Lunar Saros 148

== Related eclipses ==
=== Eclipses in 2099 ===
- An annular solar eclipse on March 21.
- A partial lunar eclipse on April 5.
- A total solar eclipse on September 14.
- A penumbral lunar eclipse on September 29.

=== Metonic ===
- Preceded by: Solar eclipse of November 27, 2095
- Followed by: Solar eclipse of July 4, 2103

=== Tzolkinex ===
- Preceded by: Solar eclipse of August 3, 2092
- Followed by: Solar eclipse of October 26, 2106

=== Half-Saros ===
- Preceded by: Lunar eclipse of September 8, 2090
- Followed by: Lunar eclipse of September 20, 2108

=== Tritos ===
- Preceded by: Solar eclipse of October 14, 2088
- Followed by: Solar eclipse of August 15, 2110

=== Solar Saros 136 ===
- Preceded by: Solar eclipse of September 3, 2081
- Followed by: Solar eclipse of September 26, 2117

=== Inex ===
- Preceded by: Solar eclipse of October 4, 2070
- Followed by: Solar eclipse of August 25, 2128

=== Triad ===
- Preceded by: Solar eclipse of November 13, 2012
- Followed by: Solar eclipse of July 16, 2186

=== Solar eclipses of 2098–2101 ===
This eclipse is a member of a semester series. An eclipse in a semester series of solar eclipses repeats approximately every 177 days and 4 hours (a semester) at alternating nodes of the Moon's orbit.

The partial solar eclipse on October 24, 2098 occurs in the previous lunar year eclipse set.

Solar eclipse series sets from 2098 to 2101
Ascending node			Descending node		
Saros	Map	Gamma	Saros	Map	Gamma
121	April 1, 2098 Partial	−1.1005	126	September 25, 2098 Partial	1.14
131	March 21, 2099 Annular	−0.4016	136	September 14, 2099 Total	0.3942
141	March 10, 2100 Annular	0.3077	146	September 4, 2100 Total	−0.3384
151	February 28, 2101 Annular	0.9964	156	August 24, 2101 Partial	−1.1392

=== Saros 136 ===
This eclipse is a part of Saros series 136, repeating every 18 years, 11 days, and containing 71 events. The series started with a partial solar eclipse on June 14, 1360. It contains annular eclipses from September 8, 1504 through November 12, 1594; hybrid eclipses from November 22, 1612 through January 17, 1703; and total eclipses from January 27, 1721 through May 13, 2496. The series ends at member 71 as a partial eclipse on July 30, 2622. Its eclipses are tabulated in three columns; every third eclipse in the same column is one exeligmos apart, so they all cast shadows over approximately the same parts of the Earth.

The longest duration of annularity was produced by member 9 at 32 seconds on September 8, 1504, and the longest duration of totality was produced by member 34 at 7 minutes, 7.74 seconds on June 20, 1955. All eclipses in this series occur at the Moon’s descending node of orbit.

Series members 26–47 occur between 1801 and 2200:
26	27	28
March 24, 1811	April 3, 1829	April 15, 1847
29	30	31
April 25, 1865	May 6, 1883	May 18, 1901
32	33	34
May 29, 1919	June 8, 1937	June 20, 1955
35	36	37
June 30, 1973	July 11, 1991	July 22, 2009
38	39	40
August 2, 2027	August 12, 2045	August 24, 2063
41	42	43
September 3, 2081	September 14, 2099	September 26, 2117
44	45	46
October 7, 2135	October 17, 2153	October 29, 2171
47
November 8, 2189

=== Metonic series ===
The metonic series repeats eclipses every 19 years (6939.69 days), lasting about 5 cycles. Eclipses occur in nearly the same calendar date. In addition, the octon subseries repeats 1/5 of that or every 3.8 years (1387.94 days). All eclipses in this table occur at the Moon's descending node.

22 eclipse events between July 3, 2065 and November 26, 2152
July 3–4	April 21–23	February 7–8	November 26–27	September 13–15
118	120	122	124	126
July 3, 2065	April 21, 2069	February 7, 2073	November 26, 2076	September 13, 2080
128	130	132	134	136
July 3, 2084	April 21, 2088	February 7, 2092	November 27, 2095	September 14, 2099
138	140	142	144	146
July 4, 2103	April 23, 2107	February 8, 2111	November 27, 2114	September 15, 2118
148	150	152	154	156
July 4, 2122	April 22, 2126	February 8, 2130	November 26, 2133	September 15, 2137
158	160	162	164	
July 3, 2141			November 26, 2152	

=== Tritos series ===
This eclipse is a part of a tritos cycle, repeating at alternating nodes every 135 synodic months (≈ 3986.63 days, or 11 years minus 1 month). Their appearance and longitude are irregular due to a lack of synchronization with the anomalistic month (period of perigee), but groupings of 3 tritos cycles (≈ 33 years minus 3 months) come close (≈ 434.044 anomalistic months), so eclipses are similar in these groupings.

Series members between 1801 and 2200
January 1, 1805 (Saros 109)		October 31, 1826 (Saros 111)		August 28, 1848 (Saros 113)
July 29, 1859 (Saros 114)	June 28, 1870 (Saros 115)	May 27, 1881 (Saros 116)	April 26, 1892 (Saros 117)	March 29, 1903 (Saros 118)
February 25, 1914 (Saros 119)	January 24, 1925 (Saros 120)	December 25, 1935 (Saros 121)	November 23, 1946 (Saros 122)	October 23, 1957 (Saros 123)
September 22, 1968 (Saros 124)	August 22, 1979 (Saros 125)	July 22, 1990 (Saros 126)	June 21, 2001 (Saros 127)	May 20, 2012 (Saros 128)
April 20, 2023 (Saros 129)	March 20, 2034 (Saros 130)	February 16, 2045 (Saros 131)	January 16, 2056 (Saros 132)	December 17, 2066 (Saros 133)
November 15, 2077 (Saros 134)	October 14, 2088 (Saros 135)	September 14, 2099 (Saros 136)	August 15, 2110 (Saros 137)	July 14, 2121 (Saros 138)
June 13, 2132 (Saros 139)	May 14, 2143 (Saros 140)	April 12, 2154 (Saros 141)	March 12, 2165 (Saros 142)	February 10, 2176 (Saros 143)
January 9, 2187 (Saros 144)	December 9, 2197 (Saros 145)			

=== Inex series ===
This eclipse is a part of the long period inex cycle, repeating at alternating nodes, every 358 synodic months (≈ 10,571.95 days, or 29 years minus 20 days). Their appearance and longitude are irregular due to a lack of synchronization with the anomalistic month (period of perigee). However, groupings of 3 inex cycles (≈ 87 years minus 2 months) comes close (≈ 1,151.02 anomalistic months), so eclipses are similar in these groupings.

Series members between 1801 and 2200
April 4, 1810 (Saros 126)	March 15, 1839 (Saros 127)	February 23, 1868 (Saros 128)
February 1, 1897 (Saros 129)	January 14, 1926 (Saros 130)	December 25, 1954 (Saros 131)
December 4, 1983 (Saros 132)	November 13, 2012 (Saros 133)	October 25, 2041 (Saros 134)
October 4, 2070 (Saros 135)	September 14, 2099 (Saros 136)	August 25, 2128 (Saros 137)
August 5, 2157 (Saros 138)	July 16, 2186 (Saros 139)	
