= Solar eclipse of June 28, 1889 =

19th-century annular solar eclipse

- Annular eclipse
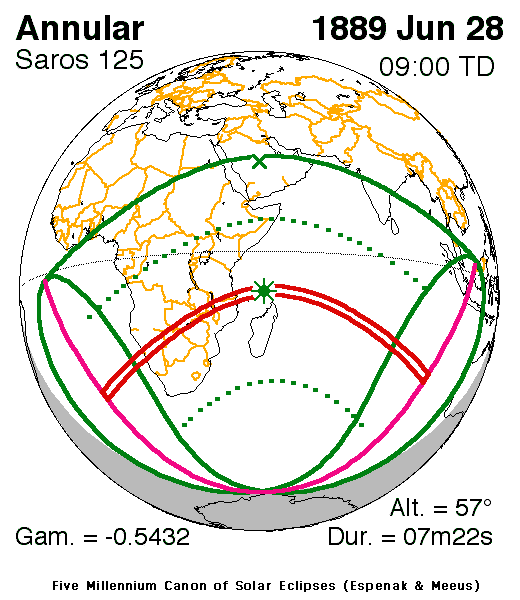
- Map
- Gamma: −0.5431
- Magnitude: 0.9471

Maximum eclipse
- Duration: 442 s (7 min 22 s)
- Coordinates: 9.6°S 47.3°E
- Max. width of band: 232 km (144 mi)

Times (UTC)
- Greatest eclipse: 9:00:00

References
- Saros: 125 (47 of 73)
- Catalog # (SE5000): 9256

An annular solar eclipse occurred at the Moon's ascending node of orbit on Friday, June 28, 1889, with a magnitude of 0.9471. A solar eclipse occurs when the Moon passes between Earth and the Sun, thereby totally or partly obscuring the image of the Sun for a viewer on Earth. An annular solar eclipse occurs when the Moon's apparent diameter is smaller than the Sun's, blocking most of the Sun's light and causing the Sun to look like an annulus (ring). An annular eclipse appears as a partial eclipse over a region of the Earth thousands of kilometres wide. Occurring about 1.1 days after apogee (on June 27, 1889, at 8:20 UTC), the Moon's apparent diameter was smaller.

The path of annularity was visible from parts of modern-day Namibia, Botswana, southeastern Angola, Zambia, Zimbabwe, Malawi, Mozambique, and Tanzania. A partial solar eclipse was also visible for parts of Southern Africa, Central Africa, East Africa, the Middle East, southern India, and western Indonesia.

== Eclipse details ==
Shown below are two tables displaying details about this particular solar eclipse. The first table outlines times at which the Moon's penumbra or umbra attains the specific parameter, and the second table describes various other parameters pertaining to this eclipse.

June 28, 1889 Solar Eclipse Times
Event	Time (UTC)
First Penumbral External Contact	1889 June 28 at 06:06:01.1 UTC
First Umbral External Contact	1889 June 28 at 07:17:54.9 UTC
First Central Line	1889 June 28 at 07:20:36.4 UTC
First Umbral Internal Contact	1889 June 28 at 07:23:19.2 UTC
Ecliptic Conjunction	1889 June 28 at 08:53:32.5 UTC
Equatorial Conjunction	1889 June 28 at 08:56:51.5 UTC
Greatest Eclipse	1889 June 28 at 09:00:00.3 UTC
Greatest Duration	1889 June 28 at 09:01:41.6 UTC
Last Umbral Internal Contact	1889 June 28 at 10:36:44.1 UTC
Last Central Line	1889 June 28 at 10:39:26.3 UTC
Last Umbral External Contact	1889 June 28 at 10:42:07.1 UTC
Last Penumbral External Contact	1889 June 28 at 11:53:59.6 UTC

June 28, 1889 Solar Eclipse Parameters
Parameter	Value
Eclipse Magnitude	0.94713
Eclipse Obscuration	0.89706
Gamma	−0.54312
Sun Right Ascension	06h29m34.7s
Sun Declination	+23°16'43.2"
Sun Semi-Diameter	15'43.8"
Sun Equatorial Horizontal Parallax	08.6"
Moon Right Ascension	06h29m40.9s
Moon Declination	+22°47'30.4"
Moon Semi-Diameter	14'42.8"
Moon Equatorial Horizontal Parallax	0°53'59.8"
ΔT	-6.1 s

== Eclipse season ==
This eclipse is part of an eclipse season, a period, roughly every six months, when eclipses occur. Only two (or occasionally three) eclipse seasons occur each year, and each season lasts about 35 days and repeats just short of six months (173 days) later; thus two full eclipse seasons always occur each year. Either two or three eclipses happen each eclipse season. In the sequence below, each eclipse is separated by a fortnight.

Eclipse season of June–July 1889
June 28 Ascending node (new moon)	July 12 Descending node (full moon)
Annular solar eclipse Solar Saros 125	Partial lunar eclipse Lunar Saros 137

== Related eclipses ==
=== Eclipses in 1889 ===
- A total solar eclipse on January 1.
- A partial lunar eclipse on January 17.
- An annular solar eclipse on June 28.
- A partial lunar eclipse on July 12.
- A total solar eclipse on December 22.

=== Metonic ===
- Preceded by: Solar eclipse of September 8, 1885
- Followed by: Solar eclipse of April 16, 1893

=== Tzolkinex ===
- Preceded by: Solar eclipse of May 17, 1882
- Followed by: Solar eclipse of August 9, 1896

=== Half-Saros ===
- Preceded by: Lunar eclipse of June 22, 1880
- Followed by: Lunar eclipse of July 3, 1898

=== Tritos ===
- Preceded by: Solar eclipse of July 29, 1878
- Followed by: Solar eclipse of May 28, 1900

=== Solar Saros 125 ===
- Preceded by: Solar eclipse of June 18, 1871
- Followed by: Solar eclipse of July 10, 1907

=== Inex ===
- Preceded by: Solar eclipse of July 18, 1860
- Followed by: Solar eclipse of June 8, 1918

=== Triad ===
- Preceded by: Solar eclipse of August 28, 1802
- Followed by: Solar eclipse of April 29, 1976

=== Solar eclipses of 1888–1891 ===
This eclipse is a member of a semester series. An eclipse in a semester series of solar eclipses repeats approximately every 177 days and 4 hours (a semester) at alternating nodes of the Moon's orbit.

The partial solar eclipses on February 11, 1888 and August 7, 1888 occur in the previous lunar year eclipse set.

Solar eclipse series sets from 1888 to 1891
Ascending node			Descending node		
Saros	Map	Gamma	Saros	Map	Gamma
115	July 9, 1888 Partial	−1.2797	120	January 1, 1889 Total	0.8603
125	June 28, 1889 Annular	−0.5431	130	December 22, 1889 Total	0.1888
135	June 17, 1890 Annular	0.2246	140	December 12, 1890 Hybrid	−0.5016
145	June 6, 1891 Annular	0.9754	150	December 1, 1891 Partial	−1.2515

=== Saros 125 ===
This eclipse is a part of Saros series 125, repeating every 18 years, 11 days, and containing 73 events. The series started with a partial solar eclipse on February 4, 1060. It contains total eclipses from June 13, 1276 through July 16, 1330; hybrid eclipses on July 26, 1348 and August 7, 1366; and annular eclipses from August 17, 1384 through August 22, 1979. The series ends at member 73 as a partial eclipse on April 9, 2358. Its eclipses are tabulated in three columns; every third eclipse in the same column is one exeligmos apart, so they all cast shadows over approximately the same parts of the Earth.

The longest duration of totality was produced by member 14 at 1 minutes, 11 seconds on June 25, 1294, and the longest duration of annularity was produced by member 48 at 7 minutes, 23 seconds on July 10, 1907. All eclipses in this series occur at the Moon’s ascending node of orbit.

Series members 43–64 occur between 1801 and 2200:
43	44	45
May 16, 1817	May 27, 1835	June 6, 1853
46	47	48
June 18, 1871	June 28, 1889	July 10, 1907
49	50	51
July 20, 1925	August 1, 1943	August 11, 1961
52	53	54
August 22, 1979	September 2, 1997	September 13, 2015
55	56	57
September 23, 2033	October 4, 2051	October 15, 2069
58	59	60
October 26, 2087	November 6, 2105	November 18, 2123
61	62	63
November 28, 2141	December 9, 2159	December 20, 2177
64
December 31, 2195

=== Metonic series ===
The metonic series repeats eclipses every 19 years (6939.69 days), lasting about 5 cycles. Eclipses occur in nearly the same calendar date. In addition, the octon subseries repeats 1/5 of that or every 3.8 years (1387.94 days). All eclipses in this table occur at the Moon's ascending node.

23 eclipse events between February 3, 1859 and June 29, 1946
February 1–3	November 21–22	September 8–10	June 28–29	April 16–18
109	111	113	115	117
February 3, 1859	November 21, 1862		June 28, 1870	April 16, 1874
119	121	123	125	127
February 2, 1878	November 21, 1881	September 8, 1885	June 28, 1889	April 16, 1893
129	131	133	135	137
February 1, 1897	November 22, 1900	September 9, 1904	June 28, 1908	April 17, 1912
139	141	143	145	147
February 3, 1916	November 22, 1919	September 10, 1923	June 29, 1927	April 18, 1931
149	151	153	155	
February 3, 1935	November 21, 1938	September 10, 1942	June 29, 1946	

=== Tritos series ===
This eclipse is a part of a tritos cycle, repeating at alternating nodes every 135 synodic months (≈ 3986.63 days, or 11 years minus 1 month). Their appearance and longitude are irregular due to a lack of synchronization with the anomalistic month (period of perigee), but groupings of 3 tritos cycles (≈ 33 years minus 3 months) come close (≈ 434.044 anomalistic months), so eclipses are similar in these groupings.

Series members between 1801 and 2200
March 4, 1802 (Saros 117)	February 1, 1813 (Saros 118)	January 1, 1824 (Saros 119)	November 30, 1834 (Saros 120)	October 30, 1845 (Saros 121)
September 29, 1856 (Saros 122)	August 29, 1867 (Saros 123)	July 29, 1878 (Saros 124)	June 28, 1889 (Saros 125)	May 28, 1900 (Saros 126)
April 28, 1911 (Saros 127)	March 28, 1922 (Saros 128)	February 24, 1933 (Saros 129)	January 25, 1944 (Saros 130)	December 25, 1954 (Saros 131)
November 23, 1965 (Saros 132)	October 23, 1976 (Saros 133)	September 23, 1987 (Saros 134)	August 22, 1998 (Saros 135)	July 22, 2009 (Saros 136)
June 21, 2020 (Saros 137)	May 21, 2031 (Saros 138)	April 20, 2042 (Saros 139)	March 20, 2053 (Saros 140)	February 17, 2064 (Saros 141)
January 16, 2075 (Saros 142)	December 16, 2085 (Saros 143)	November 15, 2096 (Saros 144)	October 16, 2107 (Saros 145)	September 15, 2118 (Saros 146)
August 15, 2129 (Saros 147)	July 14, 2140 (Saros 148)	June 14, 2151 (Saros 149)	May 14, 2162 (Saros 150)	April 12, 2173 (Saros 151)
March 12, 2184 (Saros 152)	February 10, 2195 (Saros 153)			

=== Inex series ===
This eclipse is a part of the long period inex cycle, repeating at alternating nodes, every 358 synodic months (≈ 10,571.95 days, or 29 years minus 20 days). Their appearance and longitude are irregular due to a lack of synchronization with the anomalistic month (period of perigee). However, groupings of 3 inex cycles (≈ 87 years minus 2 months) comes close (≈ 1,151.02 anomalistic months), so eclipses are similar in these groupings.

Series members between 1801 and 2200
August 28, 1802 (Saros 122)	August 7, 1831 (Saros 123)	July 18, 1860 (Saros 124)
June 28, 1889 (Saros 125)	June 8, 1918 (Saros 126)	May 20, 1947 (Saros 127)
April 29, 1976 (Saros 128)	April 8, 2005 (Saros 129)	March 20, 2034 (Saros 130)
February 28, 2063 (Saros 131)	February 7, 2092 (Saros 132)	January 19, 2121 (Saros 133)
December 30, 2149 (Saros 134)	December 9, 2178 (Saros 135)	
