= Solar eclipse of January 27, 2074 =

Future annular solar eclipse

- Annular eclipse
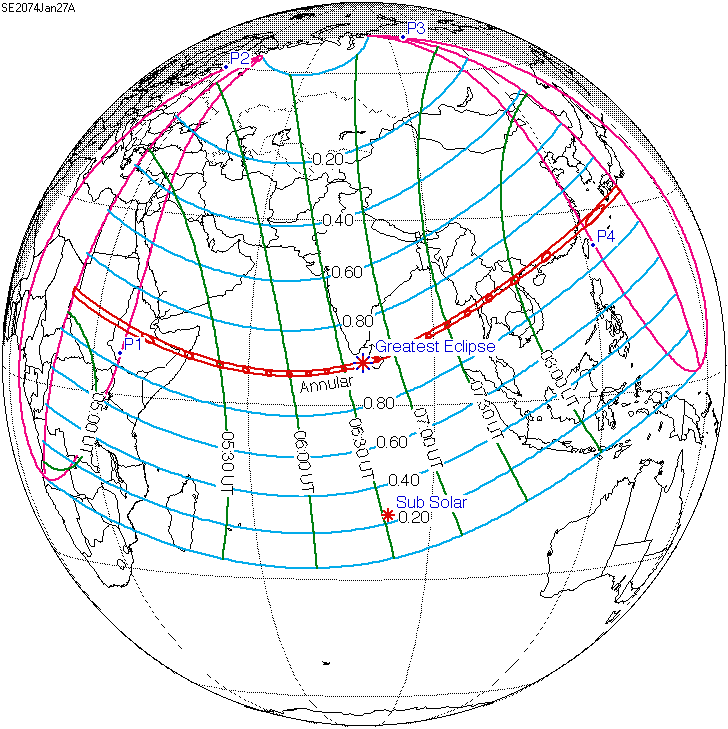
- Map
- Gamma: 0.4251
- Magnitude: 0.9798

Maximum eclipse
- Duration: 141 s (2 min 21 s)
- Coordinates: 6.6°N 78.8°E
- Max. width of band: 79 km (49 mi)

Times (UTC)
- Greatest eclipse: 6:44:15

References
- Saros: 132 (49 of 71)
- Catalog # (SE5000): 9673

An annular solar eclipse will occur at the Moon's descending node of orbit on Saturday, January 27, 2074, with a magnitude of 0.9798. A solar eclipse occurs when the Moon passes between Earth and the Sun, thereby totally or partly obscuring the image of the Sun for a viewer on Earth. An annular solar eclipse occurs when the Moon's apparent diameter is smaller than the Sun's, blocking most of the Sun's light and causing the Sun to look like an annulus (ring). An annular eclipse appears as a partial eclipse over a region of the Earth thousands of kilometres wide. Occurring about 5.2 days after apogee (on January 21, 2074, at 13:40 UTC), the Moon's apparent diameter will be smaller.

The path of annularity will be visible from parts of eastern Chad, Sudan, northern South Sudan, Ethiopia, Somalia, the Maldives, Sri Lanka, the Andaman and Nicobar Islands, Myanmar, Thailand, Laos, Vietnam, southeastern China, and southwestern Japan. A partial solar eclipse will also be visible for parts of Central Africa, East Africa, Eastern Europe, and Asia.

== Eclipse details ==
Shown below are two tables displaying details about this particular solar eclipse. The first table outlines times at which the Moon's penumbra or umbra attains the specific parameter, and the second table describes various other parameters pertaining to this eclipse.

January 27, 2074 Solar Eclipse Times
Event	Time (UTC)
First Penumbral External Contact	2074 January 27 at 03:58:42.2 UTC
First Umbral External Contact	2074 January 27 at 05:02:58.1 UTC
First Central Line	2074 January 27 at 05:04:09.1 UTC
First Umbral Internal Contact	2074 January 27 at 05:05:20.2 UTC
First Penumbral Internal Contact	2074 January 27 at 06:31:06.3 UTC
Ecliptic Conjunction	2074 January 27 at 06:39:34.7 UTC
Greatest Eclipse	2074 January 27 at 06:44:15.3 UTC
Equatorial Conjunction	2074 January 27 at 06:51:50.3 UTC
Last Penumbral Internal Contact	2074 January 27 at 06:57:10.8 UTC
Last Umbral Internal Contact	2074 January 27 at 08:23:02.8 UTC
Last Central Line	2074 January 27 at 18:06:19.2 UTC
Greatest Duration	2074 January 27 at 08:24:16.9 UTC
Last Umbral External Contact	2074 January 27 at 08:24:16.9 UTC
Last Penumbral External Contact	2074 January 27 at 09:29:51.4 UTC

January 27, 2074 Solar Eclipse Parameters
Parameter	Value
Eclipse Magnitude	0.97978
Eclipse Obscuration	0.95998
Gamma	0.42511
Sun Right Ascension	20h40m20.9s
Sun Declination	-18°20'28.4"
Sun Semi-Diameter	16'14.5"
Sun Equatorial Horizontal Parallax	08.9"
Moon Right Ascension	20h40m04.5s
Moon Declination	-17°56'22.6"
Moon Semi-Diameter	15'41.1"
Moon Equatorial Horizontal Parallax	0°57'33.8"
ΔT	100.6 s

== Eclipse season ==
This eclipse is part of an eclipse season, a period, roughly every six months, when eclipses occur. Only two (or occasionally three) eclipse seasons occur each year, and each season lasts about 35 days and repeats just short of six months (173 days) later; thus two full eclipse seasons always occur each year. Either two or three eclipses happen each eclipse season. In the sequence below, each eclipse is separated by a fortnight.

Eclipse season of January–February 2074
January 27 Descending node (new moon)	February 11 Ascending node (full moon)
Annular solar eclipse Solar Saros 132	Penumbral lunar eclipse Lunar Saros 144

== Related eclipses ==
=== Eclipses in 2074 ===
- An annular solar eclipse on January 27.
- A penumbral lunar eclipse on February 11.
- A penumbral lunar eclipse on July 8.
- An annular solar eclipse on July 24.
- A penumbral lunar eclipse on August 7.

=== Metonic ===
- Preceded by: Solar eclipse of April 11, 2070
- Followed by: Solar eclipse of November 15, 2077

=== Tzolkinex ===
- Preceded by: Solar eclipse of December 17, 2066
- Followed by: Solar eclipse of March 10, 2081

=== Half-Saros ===
- Preceded by: Lunar eclipse of January 22, 2065
- Followed by: Lunar eclipse of February 2, 2083

=== Tritos ===
- Preceded by: Solar eclipse of February 28, 2063
- Followed by: Solar eclipse of December 27, 2084

=== Solar Saros 132 ===
- Preceded by: Solar eclipse of January 16, 2056
- Followed by: Solar eclipse of February 7, 2092

=== Inex ===
- Preceded by: Solar eclipse of February 16, 2045
- Followed by: Solar eclipse of January 8, 2103

=== Triad ===
- Preceded by: Solar eclipse of March 29, 1987
- Followed by: Solar eclipse of November 27, 2160

=== Solar eclipses of 2073–2076 ===
This eclipse is a member of a semester series. An eclipse in a semester series of solar eclipses repeats approximately every 177 days and 4 hours (a semester) at alternating nodes of the Moon's orbit.

The partial solar eclipses on June 1, 2076 and November 26, 2076 occur in the next lunar year eclipse set.

Solar eclipse series sets from 2073 to 2076
Descending node			Ascending node		
Saros	Map	Gamma	Saros	Map	Gamma
122	February 7, 2073 Partial	1.1651	127	August 3, 2073 Total	−0.8763
132	January 27, 2074 Annular	0.4251	137	July 24, 2074 Annular	−0.1242
142	January 16, 2075 Total	−0.2799	147	July 13, 2075 Annular	0.6583
152	January 6, 2076 Total	−0.9373	157	July 1, 2076 Partial	1.4005

=== Saros 132 ===
This eclipse is a part of Saros series 132, repeating every 18 years, 11 days, and containing 71 events. The series started with a partial solar eclipse on August 13, 1208. It contains annular eclipses from March 17, 1569 through March 12, 2146; hybrid eclipses on March 23, 2164 and April 3, 2182; and total eclipses from April 14, 2200 through June 19, 2308. The series ends at member 71 as a partial eclipse on September 25, 2470. Its eclipses are tabulated in three columns; every third eclipse in the same column is one exeligmos apart, so they all cast shadows over approximately the same parts of the Earth.

The longest duration of annularity was produced by member 25 at 6 minutes, 56 seconds on May 9, 1641, and the longest duration of totality will be produced by member 61 at 2 minutes, 14 seconds on June 8, 2290. All eclipses in this series occur at the Moon’s descending node of orbit.

Series members 34–56 occur between 1801 and 2200:
34	35	36
August 17, 1803	August 27, 1821	September 7, 1839
37	38	39
September 18, 1857	September 29, 1875	October 9, 1893
40	41	42
October 22, 1911	November 1, 1929	November 12, 1947
43	44	45
November 23, 1965	December 4, 1983	December 14, 2001
46	47	48
December 26, 2019	January 5, 2038	January 16, 2056
49	50	51
January 27, 2074	February 7, 2092	February 18, 2110
52	53	54
March 1, 2128	March 12, 2146	March 23, 2164
55	56	
April 3, 2182	April 14, 2200	

=== Metonic series ===
The metonic series repeats eclipses every 19 years (6939.69 days), lasting about 5 cycles. Eclipses occur in nearly the same calendar date. In addition, the octon subseries repeats 1/5 of that or every 3.8 years (1387.94 days). All eclipses in this table occur at the Moon's descending node.

22 eclipse events between June 23, 2047 and November 16, 2134
June 22–23	April 10–11	January 27–29	November 15–16	September 3–5
118	120	122	124	126
June 23, 2047	April 11, 2051	January 27, 2055	November 16, 2058	September 3, 2062
128	130	132	134	136
June 22, 2066	April 11, 2070	January 27, 2074	November 15, 2077	September 3, 2081
138	140	142	144	146
June 22, 2085	April 10, 2089	January 27, 2093	November 15, 2096	September 4, 2100
148	150	152	154	156
June 22, 2104	April 11, 2108	January 29, 2112	November 16, 2115	September 5, 2119
158	160	162	164	
June 23, 2123			November 16, 2134	

=== Tritos series ===
This eclipse is a part of a tritos cycle, repeating at alternating nodes every 135 synodic months (≈ 3986.63 days, or 11 years minus 1 month). Their appearance and longitude are irregular due to a lack of synchronization with the anomalistic month (period of perigee), but groupings of 3 tritos cycles (≈ 33 years minus 3 months) come close (≈ 434.044 anomalistic months), so eclipses are similar in these groupings.

Series members between 1801 and 2200
March 14, 1801 (Saros 107)	February 12, 1812 (Saros 108)	January 12, 1823 (Saros 109)		November 10, 1844 (Saros 111)
		August 9, 1877 (Saros 114)	July 9, 1888 (Saros 115)	June 8, 1899 (Saros 116)
May 9, 1910 (Saros 117)	April 8, 1921 (Saros 118)	March 7, 1932 (Saros 119)	February 4, 1943 (Saros 120)	January 5, 1954 (Saros 121)
December 4, 1964 (Saros 122)	November 3, 1975 (Saros 123)	October 3, 1986 (Saros 124)	September 2, 1997 (Saros 125)	August 1, 2008 (Saros 126)
July 2, 2019 (Saros 127)	June 1, 2030 (Saros 128)	April 30, 2041 (Saros 129)	March 30, 2052 (Saros 130)	February 28, 2063 (Saros 131)
January 27, 2074 (Saros 132)	December 27, 2084 (Saros 133)	November 27, 2095 (Saros 134)	October 26, 2106 (Saros 135)	September 26, 2117 (Saros 136)
August 25, 2128 (Saros 137)	July 25, 2139 (Saros 138)	June 25, 2150 (Saros 139)	May 25, 2161 (Saros 140)	April 23, 2172 (Saros 141)
March 23, 2183 (Saros 142)	February 21, 2194 (Saros 143)			

=== Inex series ===
This eclipse is a part of the long period inex cycle, repeating at alternating nodes, every 358 synodic months (≈ 10,571.95 days, or 29 years minus 20 days). Their appearance and longitude are irregular due to a lack of synchronization with the anomalistic month (period of perigee). However, groupings of 3 inex cycles (≈ 87 years minus 2 months) comes close (≈ 1,151.02 anomalistic months), so eclipses are similar in these groupings.

Series members between 1801 and 2200
July 27, 1813 (Saros 123)	July 8, 1842 (Saros 124)	June 18, 1871 (Saros 125)
May 28, 1900 (Saros 126)	May 9, 1929 (Saros 127)	April 19, 1958 (Saros 128)
March 29, 1987 (Saros 129)	March 9, 2016 (Saros 130)	February 16, 2045 (Saros 131)
January 27, 2074 (Saros 132)	January 8, 2103 (Saros 133)	December 19, 2131 (Saros 134)
November 27, 2160 (Saros 135)	November 8, 2189 (Saros 136)	
