= Solar eclipse of November 27, 2095 =

Future annular solar eclipse

- Annular eclipse
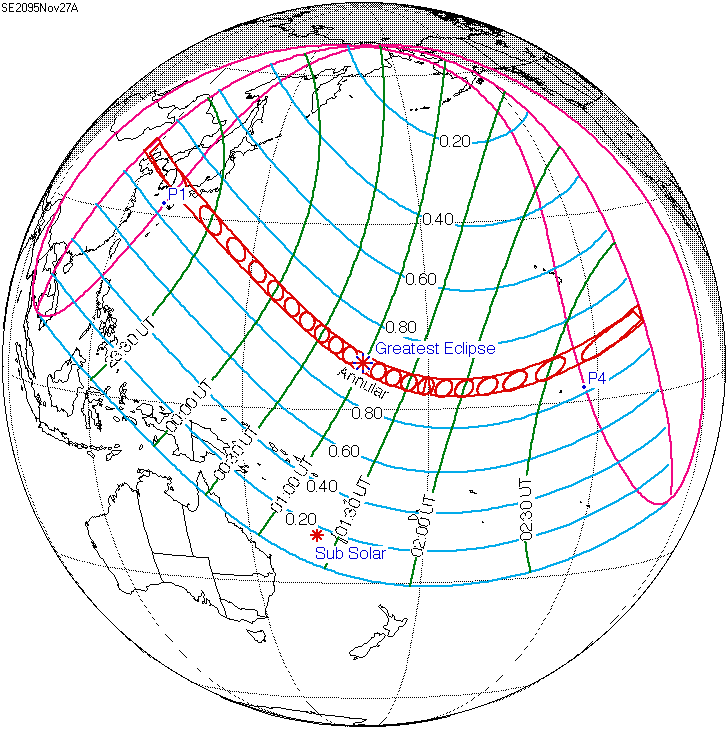
- Map
- Gamma: 0.4903
- Magnitude: 0.933

Maximum eclipse
- Duration: 527 s (8 min 47 s)
- Coordinates: 7.2°N 169.8°E
- Max. width of band: 285 km (177 mi)

Times (UTC)
- Greatest eclipse: 1:02:57

References
- Saros: 134 (48 of 71)
- Catalog # (SE5000): 9723

An annular solar eclipse will occur at the Moon's descending node of orbit between Saturday, November 26 and Sunday, November 27, 2095, with a magnitude of 0.933. A solar eclipse occurs when the Moon passes between Earth and the Sun, thereby totally or partly obscuring the image of the Sun for a viewer on Earth. An annular solar eclipse occurs when the Moon's apparent diameter is smaller than the Sun's, blocking most of the Sun's light and causing the Sun to look like an annulus (ring). An annular eclipse appears as a partial eclipse over a region of the Earth thousands of kilometres wide. Occurring about 3.8 days after apogee (on November 23, 2095, at 6:10 UTC), the Moon's apparent diameter will be smaller.

The path of annularity will be visible from parts of northeastern China, North Korea, South Korea, Japan, the Marshall Islands, and Kiribati. A partial solar eclipse will also be visible for parts of East Asia, Southeast Asia, Oceania, Hawaii, and southwestern Alaska.

== Eclipse details ==
Shown below are two tables displaying details about this particular solar eclipse. The first table outlines times at which the Moon's penumbra or umbra attains the specific parameter, and the second table describes various other parameters pertaining to this eclipse.

November 27, 2095 Solar Eclipse Times
| Event | Time (UTC) |
|---|---|
| First Penumbral External Contact | 2095 November 26 at 22:08:18.5 UTC |
| First Umbral External Contact | 2095 November 26 at 23:17:51.3 UTC |
| First Central Line | 2095 November 26 at 23:21:03.1 UTC |
| First Umbral Internal Contact | 2095 November 26 at 23:24:16.3 UTC |
| Equatorial Conjunction | 2095 November 27 at 00:46:21.1 UTC |
| Ecliptic Conjunction | 2095 November 27 at 00:57:09.8 UTC |
| Greatest Eclipse | 2095 November 27 at 01:02:57.4 UTC |
| Greatest Duration | 2095 November 27 at 01:13:24.5 UTC |
| Last Umbral Internal Contact | 2095 November 27 at 02:41:51.2 UTC |
| Last Central Line | 2095 November 27 at 02:45:02.1 UTC |
| Last Umbral External Contact | 2095 November 27 at 02:48:11.5 UTC |
| Last Penumbral External Contact | 2095 November 27 at 03:57:38.7 UTC |

November 27, 2095 Solar Eclipse Parameters
| Parameter | Value |
|---|---|
| Eclipse Magnitude | 0.93303 |
| Eclipse Obscuration | 0.87054 |
| Gamma | 0.49030 |
| Sun Right Ascension | 16h12m24.6s |
| Sun Declination | -21°07'41.4" |
| Sun Semi-Diameter | 16'12.2" |
| Sun Equatorial Horizontal Parallax | 08.9" |
| Moon Right Ascension | 16h12m56.4s |
| Moon Declination | -20°41'58.0" |
| Moon Semi-Diameter | 14'55.2" |
| Moon Equatorial Horizontal Parallax | 0°54'45.3" |
| ΔT | 119.6 s |

== Eclipse season ==
This eclipse is part of an eclipse season, a period, roughly every six months, when eclipses occur. Only two (or occasionally three) eclipse seasons occur each year, and each season lasts about 35 days and repeats just short of six months (173 days) later; thus two full eclipse seasons always occur each year. Either two or three eclipses happen each eclipse season. In the sequence below, each eclipse is separated by a fortnight.

Eclipse season of November–December 2095
| November 27 Descending node (new moon) | December 11 Ascending node (full moon) |
|---|---|
| Annular solar eclipse Solar Saros 134 | Partial lunar eclipse Lunar Saros 146 |

== Related eclipses ==
=== Eclipses in 2095 ===
- A total solar eclipse on June 2.
- A partial lunar eclipse on June 17.
- An annular solar eclipse on November 27.
- A partial lunar eclipse on December 11.

=== Metonic ===
- Preceded by: Solar eclipse of February 7, 2092
- Followed by: Solar eclipse of September 14, 2099

=== Tzolkinex ===
- Preceded by: Solar eclipse of October 14, 2088
- Followed by: Solar eclipse of January 8, 2103

=== Half-Saros ===
- Preceded by: Lunar eclipse of November 20, 2086
- Followed by: Lunar eclipse of December 2, 2104

=== Tritos ===
- Preceded by: Solar eclipse of December 27, 2084
- Followed by: Solar eclipse of October 26, 2106

=== Solar Saros 134 ===
- Preceded by: Solar eclipse of November 15, 2077
- Followed by: Solar eclipse of December 8, 2113

=== Inex ===
- Preceded by: Solar eclipse of December 17, 2066
- Followed by: Solar eclipse of November 6, 2124

=== Triad ===
- Preceded by: Solar eclipse of January 26, 2009
- Followed by: Solar eclipse of September 27, 2182

=== Solar eclipses of 2094–2098 ===
This eclipse is a member of a semester series. An eclipse in a semester series of solar eclipses repeats approximately every 177 days and 4 hours (a semester) at alternating nodes of the Moon's orbit.

The solar eclipses on January 16, 2094 (total) and July 12, 2094 (partial) occur in the previous lunar year eclipse set, and the partial solar eclipses on April 1, 2098 and September 25, 2098 occur in the next lunar year eclipse set.

Solar eclipse series sets from 2094 to 2098
| Ascending node | | | Descending node | | |
| Saros | Map | Gamma | Saros | Map | Gamma |
| 119 | June 13, 2094 Partial | −1.4613 | 124 | December 7, 2094 Partial | 1.1547 |
| 129 | June 2, 2095 Total | −0.6396 | 134 | November 27, 2095 Annular | 0.4903 |
| 139 | May 22, 2096 Total | 0.1196 | 144 | November 15, 2096 Annular | −0.20 |
| 149 | May 11, 2097 Total | 0.8516 | 154 | November 4, 2097 Annular | −0.8926 |
| 159 | May 1, 2098 | | 164 | October 24, 2098 Partial | −1.5407 |

=== Saros 134 ===
This eclipse is a part of Saros series 134, repeating every 18 years, 11 days, and containing 71 events. The series started with a partial solar eclipse on June 22, 1248. It contains total eclipses from October 9, 1428 through December 24, 1554; hybrid eclipses from January 3, 1573 through June 27, 1843; and annular eclipses from July 8, 1861 through May 21, 2384. The series ends at member 72 as a partial eclipse on August 6, 2510. Its eclipses are tabulated in three columns; every third eclipse in the same column is one exeligmos apart, so they all cast shadows over approximately the same parts of the Earth.

The longest duration of totality was produced by member 11 at 1 minutes, 30 seconds on October 9, 1428, and the longest duration of annularity will be produced by member 52 at 10 minutes, 55 seconds on January 10, 2168. All eclipses in this series occur at the Moon’s descending node of orbit.

Series members 32–53 occur between 1801 and 2200:
| 32 | 33 | 34 |
|---|---|---|
| June 6, 1807 | June 16, 1825 | June 27, 1843 |
| 35 | 36 | 37 |
| July 8, 1861 | July 19, 1879 | July 29, 1897 |
| 38 | 39 | 40 |
| August 10, 1915 | August 21, 1933 | September 1, 1951 |
| 41 | 42 | 43 |
| September 11, 1969 | September 23, 1987 | October 3, 2005 |
| 44 | 45 | 46 |
| October 14, 2023 | October 25, 2041 | November 5, 2059 |
| 47 | 48 | 49 |
| November 15, 2077 | November 27, 2095 | December 8, 2113 |
| 50 | 51 | 52 |
| December 19, 2131 | December 30, 2149 | January 10, 2168 |
53
January 20, 2186

=== Metonic series ===
The metonic series repeats eclipses every 19 years (6939.69 days), lasting about 5 cycles. Eclipses occur in nearly the same calendar date. In addition, the octon subseries repeats 1/5 of that or every 3.8 years (1387.94 days). All eclipses in this table occur at the Moon's descending node.

22 eclipse events between July 3, 2065 and November 26, 2152
| July 3–4 | April 21–23 | February 7–8 | November 26–27 | September 13–15 |
| 118 | 120 | 122 | 124 | 126 |
|---|---|---|---|---|
| July 3, 2065 | April 21, 2069 | February 7, 2073 | November 26, 2076 | September 13, 2080 |
| 128 | 130 | 132 | 134 | 136 |
| July 3, 2084 | April 21, 2088 | February 7, 2092 | November 27, 2095 | September 14, 2099 |
| 138 | 140 | 142 | 144 | 146 |
| July 4, 2103 | April 23, 2107 | February 8, 2111 | November 27, 2114 | September 15, 2118 |
| 148 | 150 | 152 | 154 | 156 |
| July 4, 2122 | April 22, 2126 | February 8, 2130 | November 26, 2133 | September 15, 2137 |
| 158 | 160 | 162 | 164 | |
| July 3, 2141 | | | November 26, 2152 | |

=== Tritos series ===
This eclipse is a part of a tritos cycle, repeating at alternating nodes every 135 synodic months (≈ 3986.63 days, or 11 years minus 1 month). Their appearance and longitude are irregular due to a lack of synchronization with the anomalistic month (period of perigee), but groupings of 3 tritos cycles (≈ 33 years minus 3 months) come close (≈ 434.044 anomalistic months), so eclipses are similar in these groupings.

Series members between 1801 and 2200
| March 14, 1801 (Saros 107) | February 12, 1812 (Saros 108) | January 12, 1823 (Saros 109) | | November 10, 1844 (Saros 111) |
| | | August 9, 1877 (Saros 114) | July 9, 1888 (Saros 115) | June 8, 1899 (Saros 116) |
| May 9, 1910 (Saros 117) | April 8, 1921 (Saros 118) | March 7, 1932 (Saros 119) | February 4, 1943 (Saros 120) | January 5, 1954 (Saros 121) |
| December 4, 1964 (Saros 122) | November 3, 1975 (Saros 123) | October 3, 1986 (Saros 124) | September 2, 1997 (Saros 125) | August 1, 2008 (Saros 126) |
| July 2, 2019 (Saros 127) | June 1, 2030 (Saros 128) | April 30, 2041 (Saros 129) | March 30, 2052 (Saros 130) | February 28, 2063 (Saros 131) |
| January 27, 2074 (Saros 132) | December 27, 2084 (Saros 133) | November 27, 2095 (Saros 134) | October 26, 2106 (Saros 135) | September 26, 2117 (Saros 136) |
| August 25, 2128 (Saros 137) | July 25, 2139 (Saros 138) | June 25, 2150 (Saros 139) | May 25, 2161 (Saros 140) | April 23, 2172 (Saros 141) |
| March 23, 2183 (Saros 142) | February 21, 2194 (Saros 143) | | | |

=== Inex series ===
This eclipse is a part of the long period inex cycle, repeating at alternating nodes, every 358 synodic months (≈ 10,571.95 days, or 29 years minus 20 days). Their appearance and longitude are irregular due to a lack of synchronization with the anomalistic month (period of perigee). However, groupings of 3 inex cycles (≈ 87 years minus 2 months) comes close (≈ 1,151.02 anomalistic months), so eclipses are similar in these groupings.

Series members between 1801 and 2200
| June 16, 1806 (Saros 124) | May 27, 1835 (Saros 125) | May 6, 1864 (Saros 126) |
| April 16, 1893 (Saros 127) | March 28, 1922 (Saros 128) | March 7, 1951 (Saros 129) |
| February 16, 1980 (Saros 130) | January 26, 2009 (Saros 131) | January 5, 2038 (Saros 132) |
| December 17, 2066 (Saros 133) | November 27, 2095 (Saros 134) | November 6, 2124 (Saros 135) |
| October 17, 2153 (Saros 136) | September 27, 2182 (Saros 137) | |
