= Solar eclipse of February 7, 2092 =

Future annular solar eclipse

- Annular eclipse
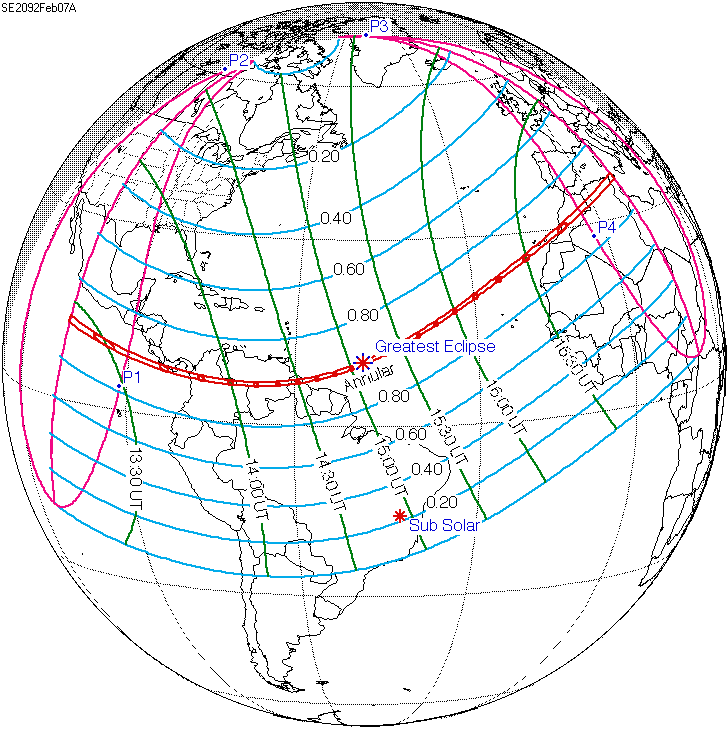
- Map
- Gamma: 0.4322
- Magnitude: 0.984

Maximum eclipse
- Duration: 108 s (1 min 48 s)
- Coordinates: 9.9°N 48.7°W
- Max. width of band: 62 km (39 mi)

Times (UTC)
- Greatest eclipse: 15:10:20

References
- Saros: 132 (50 of 71)
- Catalog # (SE5000): 9714

An annular solar eclipse will occur at the Moon's descending node of orbit on Thursday, February 7, 2092, with a magnitude of 0.984. A solar eclipse occurs when the Moon passes between Earth and the Sun, thereby totally or partly obscuring the image of the Sun for a viewer on Earth. An annular solar eclipse occurs when the Moon's apparent diameter is smaller than the Sun's, blocking most of the Sun's light and causing the Sun to look like an annulus (ring). An annular eclipse appears as a partial eclipse over a region of the Earth thousands of kilometres wide. Occurring about 6.25 days before perigee (on February 2, 2092, at 9:00 UTC), the Moon's apparent diameter will be larger.

The path of annularity will be visible from parts of Panama, Colombia, Venezuela, Guyana, the Canary Islands, Morocco, Algeria, and Tunisia. A partial solar eclipse will also be visible for parts of North America, Central America, the Caribbean, northern South America, West Africa, Northwest Africa, and Western Europe.

== Eclipse details ==
Shown below are two tables displaying details about this particular solar eclipse. The first table outlines times at which the Moon's penumbra or umbra attains the specific parameter, and the second table describes various other parameters pertaining to this eclipse.

February 7, 2092 Solar Eclipse Times
Event	Time (UTC)
First Penumbral External Contact	2092 February 7 at 12:25:43.1 UTC
First Umbral External Contact	2092 February 7 at 13:29:54.4 UTC
First Central Line	2092 February 7 at 13:30:56.4 UTC
Greatest Duration	2092 February 7 at 13:30:56.4 UTC
First Umbral Internal Contact	2092 February 7 at 13:31:58.5 UTC
First Penumbral Internal Contact	2092 February 7 at 14:59:49.7 UTC
Ecliptic Conjunction	2092 February 7 at 15:05:36.1 UTC
Greatest Eclipse	2092 February 7 at 15:10:20.2 UTC
Last Penumbral Internal Contact	2092 February 7 at 15:20:32.3 UTC
Equatorial Conjunction	2092 February 7 at 15:20:48.3 UTC
Last Umbral Internal Contact	2092 February 7 at 16:48:32.0 UTC
Last Central Line	2092 February 7 at 16:49:37.1 UTC
Last Umbral External Contact	2092 February 7 at 16:50:42.1 UTC
Last Penumbral External Contact	2092 February 7 at 17:54:58.7 UTC

February 7, 2092 Solar Eclipse Parameters
Parameter	Value
Eclipse Magnitude	0.98403
Eclipse Obscuration	0.96832
Gamma	0.43217
Sun Right Ascension	21h25m01.6s
Sun Declination	-15°10'15.3"
Sun Semi-Diameter	16'13.1"
Sun Equatorial Horizontal Parallax	08.9"
Moon Right Ascension	21h24m39.5s
Moon Declination	-14°45'56.9"
Moon Semi-Diameter	15'43.8"
Moon Equatorial Horizontal Parallax	0°57'43.8"
ΔT	116.0 s

== Eclipse season ==
This eclipse is part of an eclipse season, a period, roughly every six months, when eclipses occur. Only two (or occasionally three) eclipse seasons occur each year, and each season lasts about 35 days and repeats just short of six months (173 days) later; thus two full eclipse seasons always occur each year. Either two or three eclipses happen each eclipse season. In the sequence below, each eclipse is separated by a fortnight.

Eclipse season of February 2092
February 7 Descending node (new moon)	February 23 Ascending node (full moon)
Annular solar eclipse Solar Saros 132	Penumbral lunar eclipse Lunar Saros 144

== Related eclipses ==
=== Eclipses in 2092 ===
- An annular solar eclipse on February 7.
- A penumbral lunar eclipse on February 23.
- A penumbral lunar eclipse on July 19.
- An annular solar eclipse on August 3.
- A penumbral lunar eclipse on August 17.

=== Metonic ===
- Preceded by: Solar eclipse of April 21, 2088
- Followed by: Solar eclipse of November 27, 2095

=== Tzolkinex ===
- Preceded by: Solar eclipse of December 27, 2084
- Followed by: Solar eclipse of March 21, 2099

=== Half-Saros ===
- Preceded by: Lunar eclipse of February 2, 2083
- Followed by: Lunar eclipse of February 14, 2101

=== Tritos ===
- Preceded by: Solar eclipse of March 10, 2081
- Followed by: Solar eclipse of January 8, 2103

=== Solar Saros 132 ===
- Preceded by: Solar eclipse of January 27, 2074
- Followed by: Solar eclipse of February 18, 2110

=== Inex ===
- Preceded by: Solar eclipse of February 28, 2063
- Followed by: Solar eclipse of January 19, 2121

=== Triad ===
- Preceded by: Solar eclipse of April 8, 2005
- Followed by: Solar eclipse of December 9, 2178

=== Solar eclipses of 2091–2094 ===
This eclipse is a member of a semester series. An eclipse in a semester series of solar eclipses repeats approximately every 177 days and 4 hours (a semester) at alternating nodes of the Moon's orbit.

The partial solar eclipses on June 13, 2094 and December 7, 2094 occur in the next lunar year eclipse set.

Solar eclipse series sets from 2091 to 2094
Descending node			Ascending node		
Saros	Map	Gamma	Saros	Map	Gamma
122	February 18, 2091 Partial	1.1779	127	August 15, 2091 Total	−0.949
132	February 7, 2092 Annular	0.4322	137	August 3, 2092 Annular	−0.2044
142	January 27, 2093 Total	−0.2737	147	July 23, 2093 Annular	0.5717
152	January 16, 2094 Total	−0.9333	157	July 12, 2094 Partial	1.3150

=== Saros 132 ===
This eclipse is a part of Saros series 132, repeating every 18 years, 11 days, and containing 71 events. The series started with a partial solar eclipse on August 13, 1208. It contains annular eclipses from March 17, 1569 through March 12, 2146; hybrid eclipses on March 23, 2164 and April 3, 2182; and total eclipses from April 14, 2200 through June 19, 2308. The series ends at member 71 as a partial eclipse on September 25, 2470. Its eclipses are tabulated in three columns; every third eclipse in the same column is one exeligmos apart, so they all cast shadows over approximately the same parts of the Earth.

The longest duration of annularity was produced by member 25 at 6 minutes, 56 seconds on May 9, 1641, and the longest duration of totality will be produced by member 61 at 2 minutes, 14 seconds on June 8, 2290. All eclipses in this series occur at the Moon’s descending node of orbit.

Series members 34–56 occur between 1801 and 2200:
34	35	36
August 17, 1803	August 27, 1821	September 7, 1839
37	38	39
September 18, 1857	September 29, 1875	October 9, 1893
40	41	42
October 22, 1911	November 1, 1929	November 12, 1947
43	44	45
November 23, 1965	December 4, 1983	December 14, 2001
46	47	48
December 26, 2019	January 5, 2038	January 16, 2056
49	50	51
January 27, 2074	February 7, 2092	February 18, 2110
52	53	54
March 1, 2128	March 12, 2146	March 23, 2164
55	56	
April 3, 2182	April 14, 2200	

=== Metonic series ===
The metonic series repeats eclipses every 19 years (6939.69 days), lasting about 5 cycles. Eclipses occur in nearly the same calendar date. In addition, the octon subseries repeats 1/5 of that or every 3.8 years (1387.94 days). All eclipses in this table occur at the Moon's descending node.

22 eclipse events between July 3, 2065 and November 26, 2152
July 3–4	April 21–23	February 7–8	November 26–27	September 13–15
118	120	122	124	126
July 3, 2065	April 21, 2069	February 7, 2073	November 26, 2076	September 13, 2080
128	130	132	134	136
July 3, 2084	April 21, 2088	February 7, 2092	November 27, 2095	September 14, 2099
138	140	142	144	146
July 4, 2103	April 23, 2107	February 8, 2111	November 27, 2114	September 15, 2118
148	150	152	154	156
July 4, 2122	April 22, 2126	February 8, 2130	November 26, 2133	September 15, 2137
158	160	162	164	
July 3, 2141			November 26, 2152	

=== Tritos series ===
This eclipse is a part of a tritos cycle, repeating at alternating nodes every 135 synodic months (≈ 3986.63 days, or 11 years minus 1 month). Their appearance and longitude are irregular due to a lack of synchronization with the anomalistic month (period of perigee), but groupings of 3 tritos cycles (≈ 33 years minus 3 months) come close (≈ 434.044 anomalistic months), so eclipses are similar in these groupings.

Series members between 1801 and 2200
March 25, 1819 (Saros 107)	February 23, 1830 (Saros 108)	January 22, 1841 (Saros 109)		November 21, 1862 (Saros 111)
		August 20, 1895 (Saros 114)	July 21, 1906 (Saros 115)	June 19, 1917 (Saros 116)
May 19, 1928 (Saros 117)	April 19, 1939 (Saros 118)	March 18, 1950 (Saros 119)	February 15, 1961 (Saros 120)	January 16, 1972 (Saros 121)
December 15, 1982 (Saros 122)	November 13, 1993 (Saros 123)	October 14, 2004 (Saros 124)	September 13, 2015 (Saros 125)	August 12, 2026 (Saros 126)
July 13, 2037 (Saros 127)	June 11, 2048 (Saros 128)	May 11, 2059 (Saros 129)	April 11, 2070 (Saros 130)	March 10, 2081 (Saros 131)
February 7, 2092 (Saros 132)	January 8, 2103 (Saros 133)	December 8, 2113 (Saros 134)	November 6, 2124 (Saros 135)	October 7, 2135 (Saros 136)
September 6, 2146 (Saros 137)	August 5, 2157 (Saros 138)	July 5, 2168 (Saros 139)	June 5, 2179 (Saros 140)	May 4, 2190 (Saros 141)

=== Inex series ===
This eclipse is a part of the long period inex cycle, repeating at alternating nodes, every 358 synodic months (≈ 10,571.95 days, or 29 years minus 20 days). Their appearance and longitude are irregular due to a lack of synchronization with the anomalistic month (period of perigee). However, groupings of 3 inex cycles (≈ 87 years minus 2 months) comes close (≈ 1,151.02 anomalistic months), so eclipses are similar in these groupings.

Series members between 1801 and 2200
August 28, 1802 (Saros 122)	August 7, 1831 (Saros 123)	July 18, 1860 (Saros 124)
June 28, 1889 (Saros 125)	June 8, 1918 (Saros 126)	May 20, 1947 (Saros 127)
April 29, 1976 (Saros 128)	April 8, 2005 (Saros 129)	March 20, 2034 (Saros 130)
February 28, 2063 (Saros 131)	February 7, 2092 (Saros 132)	January 19, 2121 (Saros 133)
December 30, 2149 (Saros 134)	December 9, 2178 (Saros 135)	
