= Solar eclipse of October 7, 1801 =

Partial Solar eclipse October 7, 1801

- Partial eclipse
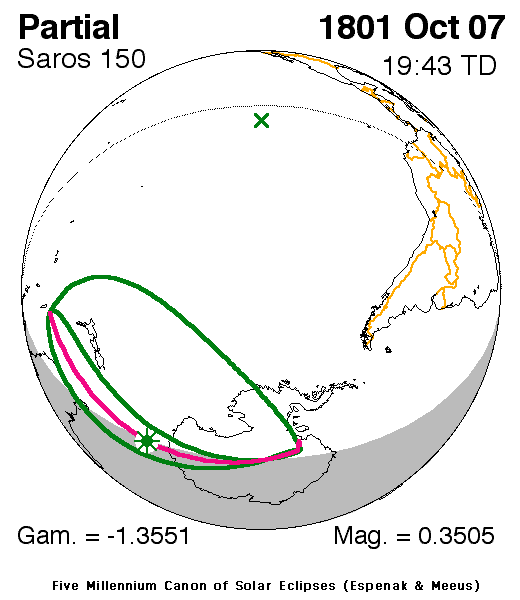
- Map
- Gamma: −1.3552
- Magnitude: 0.3505

Maximum eclipse
- Coordinates: 61.2°S 141.3°E

Times (UTC)
- Greatest eclipse: 19:42:34

References
- Saros: 150 (5 of 71)
- Catalog # (SE5000): 9043

A partial solar eclipse occurred at the Moon's descending node of orbit on Wednesday, October 7, 1801, with a magnitude of 0.3505. A solar eclipse occurs when the Moon passes between Earth and the Sun, thereby totally or partly obscuring the image of the Sun for a viewer on Earth. A partial solar eclipse occurs in the polar regions of the Earth when the center of the Moon's shadow misses the Earth.

The partial solar eclipse was visible for parts of modern-day New Zealand and Antarctica.

== Eclipse details ==
Shown below are two tables displaying details about this particular solar eclipse. The first table outlines times at which the Moon's penumbra or umbra attains the specific parameter, and the second table describes various other parameters pertaining to this eclipse.

October 7, 1801 Solar Eclipse Times
Event	Time (UTC)
First Penumbral External Contact	1801 October 7 at 18:16:51.9 UTC
Greatest Eclipse	1801 October 7 at 19:42:33.8 UTC
Ecliptic Conjunction	1801 October 7 at 19:57:06.5 UTC
Equatorial Conjunction	1801 October 7 at 21:04:25.4 UTC
Last Penumbral External Contact	1801 October 7 at 21:07:38.1 UTC

October 7, 1801 Solar Eclipse Parameters
Parameter	Value
Eclipse Magnitude	0.35050
Eclipse Obscuration	0.23316
Gamma	−1.35518
Sun Right Ascension	12h51m43.2s
Sun Declination	-05°32'55.4"
Sun Semi-Diameter	16'01.2"
Sun Equatorial Horizontal Parallax	08.8"
Moon Right Ascension	12h49m16.8s
Moon Declination	-06°40'26.2"
Moon Semi-Diameter	15'27.7"
Moon Equatorial Horizontal Parallax	0°56'44.6"
ΔT	12.8 s

== Eclipse season ==
This eclipse is part of an eclipse season, a period, roughly every six months, when eclipses occur. Only two (or occasionally three) eclipse seasons occur each year, and each season lasts about 35 days and repeats just short of six months (173 days) later; thus two full eclipse seasons always occur each year. Either two or three eclipses happen each eclipse season. In the sequence below, each eclipse is separated by a fortnight. The first and last eclipse in this sequence is separated by one synodic month.

Eclipse season of September–October 1801
September 8 Descending node (new moon)	September 22 Ascending node (full moon)	October 7 Descending node (new moon)
Partial solar eclipse Solar Saros 112	Total lunar eclipse Lunar Saros 124	Partial solar eclipse Solar Saros 150

== Related eclipses ==
=== Eclipses in 1801 ===
- A partial solar eclipse on March 14.
- A total lunar eclipse on March 30.
- A partial solar eclipse on April 13.
- A partial solar eclipse on September 8.
- A total lunar eclipse on September 22.
- A partial solar eclipse on October 7.

=== Metonic ===
- Preceded by: Solar eclipse of December 18, 1797
- Followed by: Solar eclipse of July 26, 1805

=== Tzolkinex ===
- Preceded by: Solar eclipse of August 25, 1794
- Followed by: Solar eclipse of November 18, 1808

=== Half-Saros ===
- Preceded by: Lunar eclipse of September 30, 1792
- Followed by: Lunar eclipse of October 12, 1810

=== Tritos ===
- Preceded by: Solar eclipse of November 6, 1790
- Followed by: Solar eclipse of September 5, 1812

=== Solar Saros 150 ===
- Preceded by: Solar eclipse of September 26, 1783
- Followed by: Solar eclipse of October 19, 1819

=== Inex ===
- Preceded by: Solar eclipse of October 26, 1772
- Followed by: Solar eclipse of September 17, 1830

=== Triad ===
- Preceded by: Solar eclipse of December 7, 1714
- Followed by: Solar eclipse of August 7, 1888

=== Solar eclipses of 1798–1801 ===
This eclipse is a member of a semester series. An eclipse in a semester series of solar eclipses repeats approximately every 177 days and 4 hours (a semester) at alternating nodes of the Moon's orbit.

The partial solar eclipses on [h] occur in the previous lunar year eclipse set, and the partial solar eclipses on March 14, 1801 and September 8, 1801 occur in the next lunar year eclipse set.

Solar eclipse series sets from 1798 to 1801
Ascending node			Descending node		
Saros	Map	Gamma	Saros	Map	Gamma
115	May 15, 1798; Annular	−0.8744	120	November 8, 1798 Total	0.8270
125	May 5, 1799; Annular	−0.1310	130	October 28, 1799 Total	0.1274
135	April 24, 1800 Annular	0.6125	140	October 18, 1800 Total	−0.5787
145	April 13, 1801 Partial	1.3152	150	October 7, 1801 Partial	−1.3552

=== Saros 150 ===
This eclipse is a part of Saros series 150, repeating every 18 years, 11 days, and containing 71 events. The series started with a partial solar eclipse on August 24, 1729. It contains annular eclipses from April 22, 2126 through June 22, 2829. There are no hybrid or total eclipses in this set. The series ends at member 71 as a partial eclipse on September 29, 2991. Its eclipses are tabulated in three columns; every third eclipse in the same column is one exeligmos apart, so they all cast shadows over approximately the same parts of the Earth.

The longest duration of annularity will be produced by member 45 at 9 minutes, 58 seconds on December 19, 2522. All eclipses in this series occur at the Moon’s descending node of orbit.

Series members 5–27 occur between 1801 and 2200:
5	6	7
October 7, 1801	October 19, 1819	October 29, 1837
8	9	10
November 9, 1855	November 20, 1873	December 1, 1891
11	12	13
December 12, 1909	December 24, 1927	January 3, 1946
14	15	16
January 14, 1964	January 25, 1982	February 5, 2000
17	18	19
February 15, 2018	February 27, 2036	March 9, 2054
20	21	22
March 19, 2072	March 31, 2090	April 11, 2108
23	24	25
April 22, 2126	May 3, 2144	May 14, 2162
26	27	
May 24, 2180	June 4, 2198	

=== Metonic series ===
The metonic series repeats eclipses every 19 years (6939.69 days), lasting about 5 cycles. Eclipses occur in nearly the same calendar date. In addition, the octon subseries repeats 1/5 of that or every 3.8 years (1387.94 days). All eclipses in this table occur at the Moon's descending node.

2 eclipse events between October 7, 1801 and July 26, 1805
October 7	July 26
150	152
October 7, 1801	July 26, 1805

=== Tritos series ===
This eclipse is a part of a tritos cycle, repeating at alternating nodes every 135 synodic months (≈ 3986.63 days, or 11 years minus 1 month). Their appearance and longitude are irregular due to a lack of synchronization with the anomalistic month (period of perigee), but groupings of 3 tritos cycles (≈ 33 years minus 3 months) come close (≈ 434.044 anomalistic months), so eclipses are similar in these groupings.

Series members between 1801 and 1823
October 7, 1801 (Saros 150)	September 5, 1812 (Saros 151)	August 6, 1823 (Saros 152)

=== Inex series ===
This eclipse is a part of the long period inex cycle, repeating at alternating nodes, every 358 synodic months (≈ 10,571.95 days, or 29 years minus 20 days). Their appearance and longitude are irregular due to a lack of synchronization with the anomalistic month (period of perigee). However, groupings of 3 inex cycles (≈ 87 years minus 2 months) comes close (≈ 1,151.02 anomalistic months), so eclipses are similar in these groupings.

Series members between 1801 and 1946
October 7, 1801 (Saros 150)	September 17, 1830 (Saros 151)	August 28, 1859 (Saros 152)
August 7, 1888 (Saros 153)	July 19, 1917 (Saros 154)	June 29, 1946 (Saros 155)

== See also ==
- List of solar eclipses in the 19th century
