= Solar eclipse of April 13, 1801 =

Partial solar eclipse April 13, 1801

- Partial eclipse
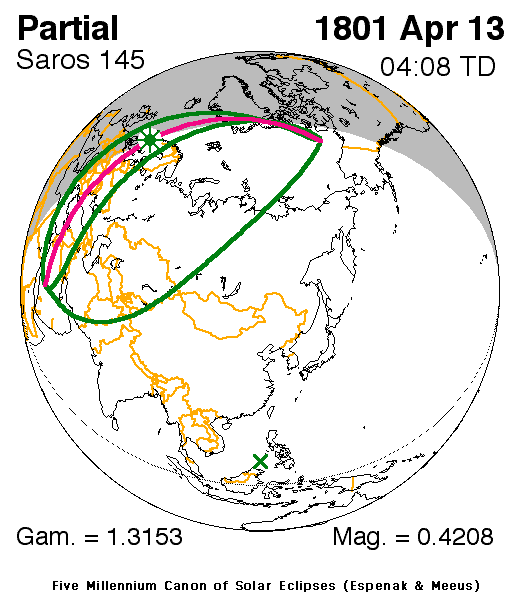
- Map
- Gamma: 1.3152
- Magnitude: 0.4208

Maximum eclipse
- Coordinates: 61.3°N 11.7°E

Times (UTC)
- Greatest eclipse: 4:08:06

References
- Saros: 145 (10 of 77)
- Catalog # (SE5000): 9041

A partial solar eclipse occurred at the Moon's ascending node of orbit on Monday, April 13, 1801, with a magnitude of 0.4208. A solar eclipse occurs when the Moon passes between Earth and the Sun, thereby totally or partly obscuring the image of the Sun for a viewer on Earth. A partial solar eclipse occurs in the polar regions of the Earth when the center of the Moon's shadow misses the Earth.

The partial solar eclipse was visible for parts of modern-day eastern Europe, the Middle East, Central Asia, and western Russia.

== Eclipse details ==
Shown below are two tables displaying details about this particular solar eclipse. The first table outlines times at which the Moon's penumbra or umbra attains the specific parameter, and the second table describes various other parameters pertaining to this eclipse.

April 13, 1801 Solar Eclipse Times
Event	Time (UTC)
First Penumbral External Contact	1801 April 13 at 02:34:55.9 UTC
Greatest Eclipse	1801 April 13 at 04:08:06.0 UTC
Ecliptic Conjunction	1801 April 13 at 04:22:34.4 UTC
Equatorial Conjunction	1801 April 13 at 05:24:45.4 UTC
Last Penumbral External Contact	1801 April 13 at 05:40:50.4 UTC

April 13, 1801 Solar Eclipse Parameters
Parameter	Value
Eclipse Magnitude	0.42080
Eclipse Obscuration	0.30319
Gamma	1.31524
Sun Right Ascension	01h24m07.8s
Sun Declination	+08°51'22.7"
Sun Semi-Diameter	15'56.2"
Sun Equatorial Horizontal Parallax	08.8"
Moon Right Ascension	01h21m49.0s
Moon Declination	+09°57'16.7"
Moon Semi-Diameter	15'25.5"
Moon Equatorial Horizontal Parallax	0°56'36.5"
ΔT	12.9 s

== Eclipse season ==
This eclipse is part of an eclipse season, a period, roughly every six months, when eclipses occur. Only two (or occasionally three) eclipse seasons occur each year, and each season lasts about 35 days and repeats just short of six months (173 days) later; thus two full eclipse seasons always occur each year. Either two or three eclipses happen each eclipse season. In the sequence below, each eclipse is separated by a fortnight. The first and last eclipse in this sequence is separated by one synodic month.

Eclipse season of March–April 1801
March 14 Ascending node (new moon)	March 30 Descending node (full moon)	April 13 Ascending node (new moon)
Partial solar eclipse Solar Saros 107	Total lunar eclipse Lunar Saros 119	Partial solar eclipse Solar Saros 145

== Related eclipses ==
=== Eclipses in 1801 ===
- A partial solar eclipse on March 14.
- A total lunar eclipse on March 30.
- A partial solar eclipse on April 13.
- A partial solar eclipse on September 8.
- A total lunar eclipse on September 22.
- A partial solar eclipse on October 7.

=== Metonic ===
- Preceded by: Solar eclipse of June 24, 1797
- Followed by: Solar eclipse of January 30, 1805

=== Tzolkinex ===
- Preceded by: Solar eclipse of March 1, 1794
- Followed by: Solar eclipse of May 25, 1808

=== Half-Saros ===
- Preceded by: Lunar eclipse of April 7, 1792
- Followed by: Lunar eclipse of April 19, 1810

=== Tritos ===
- Preceded by: Solar eclipse of May 14, 1790
- Followed by: Solar eclipse of March 13, 1812

=== Solar Saros 145 ===
- Preceded by: Solar eclipse of April 1, 1783
- Followed by: Solar eclipse of April 24, 1819

=== Inex ===
- Preceded by: Solar eclipse of May 2, 1772
- Followed by: Solar eclipse of March 24, 1830

=== Triad ===
- Preceded by: Solar eclipse of June 12, 1714
- Followed by: Solar eclipse of February 11, 1888

=== Solar eclipses of 1798–1801 ===
This eclipse is a member of a semester series. An eclipse in a semester series of solar eclipses repeats approximately every 177 days and 4 hours (a semester) at alternating nodes of the Moon's orbit.

The partial solar eclipses on [h] occur in the previous lunar year eclipse set, and the partial solar eclipses on March 14, 1801 and September 8, 1801 occur in the next lunar year eclipse set.

Solar eclipse series sets from 1798 to 1801
Ascending node			Descending node		
Saros	Map	Gamma	Saros	Map	Gamma
115	May 15, 1798; Annular	−0.8744	120	November 8, 1798 Total	0.8270
125	May 5, 1799; Annular	−0.1310	130	October 28, 1799 Total	0.1274
135	April 24, 1800 Annular	0.6125	140	October 18, 1800 Total	−0.5787
145	April 13, 1801 Partial	1.3152	150	October 7, 1801 Partial	−1.3552

=== Saros 145 ===
This eclipse is a part of Saros series 145, repeating every 18 years, 11 days, and containing 77 events. The series started with a partial solar eclipse on January 4, 1639. It contains an annular eclipse on June 6, 1891; a hybrid eclipse on June 17, 1909; and total eclipses from June 29, 1927 through September 9, 2648. The series ends at member 77 as a partial eclipse on April 17, 3009. Its eclipses are tabulated in three columns; every third eclipse in the same column is one exeligmos apart, so they all cast shadows over approximately the same parts of the Earth.

The longest duration of annularity was produced by member 15 at 6 seconds (by default) on June 6, 1891, and the longest duration of totality will be produced by member 50 at 7 minutes, 12 seconds on June 25, 2522. All eclipses in this series occur at the Moon’s ascending node of orbit.

Series members 10–32 occur between 1801 and 2200:
10	11	12
April 13, 1801	April 24, 1819	May 4, 1837
13	14	15
May 16, 1855	May 26, 1873	June 6, 1891
16	17	18
June 17, 1909	June 29, 1927	July 9, 1945
19	20	21
July 20, 1963	July 31, 1981	August 11, 1999
22	23	24
August 21, 2017	September 2, 2035	September 12, 2053
25	26	27
September 23, 2071	October 4, 2089	October 16, 2107
28	29	30
October 26, 2125	November 7, 2143	November 17, 2161
31	32	
November 28, 2179	December 9, 2197	

=== Metonic series ===
The metonic series repeats eclipses every 19 years (6939.69 days), lasting about 5 cycles. Eclipses occur in nearly the same calendar date. In addition, the octon subseries repeats 1/5 of that or every 3.8 years (1387.94 days). All eclipses in this table occur at the Moon's ascending node.

2 eclipse events between April 13, 1801 and September 5, 1812
April 13	January 30	November 18	September 5
145	147	149	151
April 13, 1801	January 30, 1805	November 18, 1808	September 5, 1812

=== Tritos series ===
This eclipse is a part of a tritos cycle, repeating at alternating nodes every 135 synodic months (≈ 3986.63 days, or 11 years minus 1 month). Their appearance and longitude are irregular due to a lack of synchronization with the anomalistic month (period of perigee), but groupings of 3 tritos cycles (≈ 33 years minus 3 months) come close (≈ 434.044 anomalistic months), so eclipses are similar in these groupings.

Series members between 1801 and 1888
April 13, 1801 (Saros 145)	March 13, 1812 (Saros 146)	February 11, 1823 (Saros 147)	January 9, 1834 (Saros 148)	December 9, 1844 (Saros 149)
November 9, 1855 (Saros 150)	October 8, 1866 (Saros 151)	September 7, 1877 (Saros 152)	August 7, 1888 (Saros 153)	

=== Inex series ===
This eclipse is a part of the long period inex cycle, repeating at alternating nodes, every 358 synodic months (≈ 10,571.95 days, or 29 years minus 20 days). Their appearance and longitude are irregular due to a lack of synchronization with the anomalistic month (period of perigee). However, groupings of 3 inex cycles (≈ 87 years minus 2 months) comes close (≈ 1,151.02 anomalistic months), so eclipses are similar in these groupings.

Series members between 1801 and 2200
April 13, 1801 (Saros 145)	March 24, 1830 (Saros 146)	March 4, 1859 (Saros 147)
February 11, 1888 (Saros 148)	January 23, 1917 (Saros 149)	January 3, 1946 (Saros 150)
December 13, 1974 (Saros 151)	November 23, 2003 (Saros 152)	November 3, 2032 (Saros 153)
October 13, 2061 (Saros 154)	September 23, 2090 (Saros 155)	September 5, 2119 (Saros 156)
August 14, 2148 (Saros 157)	July 25, 2177 (Saros 158)	

== See also ==
- List of solar eclipses in the 19th century
