= List of solar eclipses in the 21st century =

During the 21st century, there will be 224 solar eclipses of which 77 will be partial, 72 will be annular, 68 will be total and 7 will be hybrids between total and annular eclipses. Of these, two annular and one total eclipse will be non-central, in the sense that the very center (axis) of the Moon's shadow will miss the Earth (for more information see gamma). In the 21st century, the greatest number of eclipses in one year is four, in 2011, 2029, 2047, 2065, 2076, and 2094. The predictions given here are by Fred Espenak of NASA's Goddard Space Flight Center.

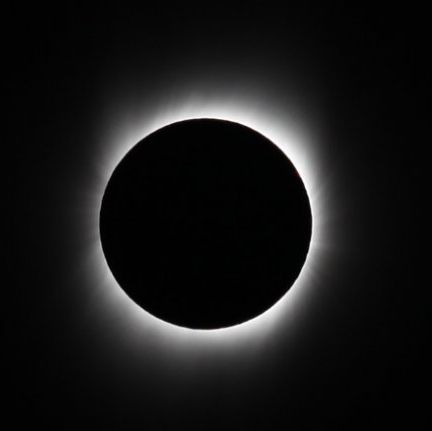
Total solar eclipse of July 22, 2009, from Bangladesh.

At this point, the longest measured duration in which the Moon completely covered the Sun, known as totality, was during the solar eclipse of July 22, 2009. This total solar eclipse had a maximum duration of 6 minutes and 38.86 seconds. The longest possible duration of a total solar eclipse is 7 minutes and 32 seconds. The longest annular solar eclipse of the 21st century took place on January 15, 2010, with a duration of 11 minutes and 7.8 seconds. The maximum possible duration is 12 minutes and 29 seconds. The eclipse of May 20, 2050, will be the second hybrid eclipse in the span of less than one year, the first one being on November 25, 2049.^{[a]}

The table contains the date and time of the greatest eclipse (in dynamical time, which in this case is the time when the axis of the Moon's shadow cone passes closest to the centre of Earth; this is in (Ephemeris Time). The number of the saros series that the eclipse belongs to is given, followed by the type of the eclipse (either total, annular, partial or hybrid), the gamma of the eclipse (how centrally the shadow of the Moon strikes the Earth), and the magnitude of the eclipse (the fraction of the Sun's diameter obscured by the Moon). For total and annular eclipses, the duration of the eclipse is given, as well as the location of the greatest eclipse (the point of maximum eclipse) and the path width of the total or annular eclipse. The geographical areas from which the eclipse can be seen are listed along with a chart illustrating each eclipse's respective path.

== Eclipses ==
Date	Time of greatest eclipse (Terrestrial Time)	Saros	Type	Gamma	Magnitude	Central duration (min:s)	Location	Path width		Country	Chart	Ref(s)
Date	Time of greatest eclipse (Terrestrial Time)	Saros	Type	Gamma	Magnitude	Central duration (min:s)	Location	km	mi	Country	Chart	Ref(s)
June 21, 2001	12:04:46	127	Total	−0.5701	1.0495	4:57	11.3°S 2.7°E	200	120	Total: Angola, Zambia, Zimbabwe, Mozambique and Madagascar; Partial: Eastern South America, Africa		^{[a]}
December 14, 2001	20:53:01	132	Annular	0.4089	0.9681	3:53	0.6°N 130.7°W	126	78	Annular: Nicaragua and Costa Rica; Partial: North and Central America, northwestern South America, Hawaii		^{[a]}
June 10, 2002	23:45:22	137	Annular	0.1993	0.9962	0:23	34.5°N 178.6°W	13	8.1	Annular: Indonesia, Kayangel Atoll, the Northern Mariana Islands, Jalisco, Mexico; Partial: Eastern Asia, Northeastern Australia, North America, Hawaii		^{[a]}
December 4, 2002	07:32:16	142	Total	−0.302	1.0244	2:04	39.5°S 59.6°E	87	54	Total: Angola, Botswana, Zimbabwe, South Africa, Mozambique and South Australia; Partial: Africa, Antarctica, Indonesia, Australia		^{[a]}
May 31, 2003	04:09:22	147	Annular	0.996	0.9384	3:37	66.6°N 24.5°W	—		Annular: Greenland, Iceland, northeastern Scotland, Faroe Islands, Shetland Islands; Partial: Eastern Europe, North Asia, West Asia, Middle East, Alaska, Greenland, northwestern Canada		^{[a]}
November 23, 2003	22:50:22	152	Total	−0.9638	1.0379	1:57	72.7°S 88.4°E	495	308	Total: East Antarctica; Partial: Australia, New Zealand, Antarctica, southern Chile and Argentina		^{[a]}
April 19, 2004	13:35:05	119	Partial	−1.1335	0.7367	—	61.6°S 44.3°E	—		Partial: Antarctica, Southern Africa		^{[a]}
October 14, 2004	03:00:23	124	Partial	1.0348	0.9282	—	61.2°N 153.7°W	—		Partial: Eastern Russia, Mongolia, northeastern China, Korea, Japan, Hawaii, western Alaska		^{[a]}
April 8, 2005	20:36:51	129	Hybrid	−0.3473	1.0074	0:42	10.6°S 119.0°W	27	17	Total: None; Annular: Bounty Islands, Southeastern French Polynesia, Panama, Colombia, Venezuela; Partial: New Zealand, Oceania, West Antarctica, Mexico, Central America, Caribbean, Western South America		^{[a]}
October 3, 2005	10:32:47	134	Annular	0.3306	0.9576	4:32	12.9°N 28.7°E	162	101	Annular: Portugal, Spain, Algeria, Tunisia, Libya, Chad, Sudan, Ethiopia, Kenya and Somalia; Partial: Europe, Africa, Middle East, South Asia		^{[a]}
March 29, 2006	10:12:23	139	Total	0.3843	1.0515	4:07	23.2°N 16.7°E	184	114	Total: Brazil, Ghana, Togo, Benin, Nigeria, Niger, Libya, northwest Egypt, Turkey, Georgia, southwestern Russia and Kazakhstan; Partial: Eastern South America, North Africa, Central Africa, Europe, Middle East, Central Asia, South Asia		^{[a]}
September 22, 2006	11:41:16	144	Annular	−0.4062	0.9352	7:09	20.6°S 9.1°W	261	162	Annular: Guyana, Suriname and French Guiana; Partial: South America, West Africa, Southern Africa, Antarctic Peninsula, East Antarctica		^{[a]}
March 19, 2007	02:32:57	149	Partial	1.0728	0.8756	—	61.0°N 55.5°E	—		Partial: Northeastern Europe, Asia, Alaska		^{[a]}
September 11, 2007	12:32:24	154	Partial	−1.1255	0.7507	—	61.0°S 90.2°W	—		Partial: Central and Southern South America, Antarctic Peninsula, East Antarctica		^{[a]}
February 7, 2008	03:56:10	121	Annular	−0.957	0.965	2:12	67.6°S 150.5°W	444	276	Annular: West Antarctica; Partial: Antarctica, Southeastern Australia, New Zealand, Oceania		^{[a]}
August 1, 2008	10:22:12	126	Total	0.8307	1.0394	2:27	65.7°N 72.3°E	237	147	Total: Nunavut, Northern Greenland, Central Russia, Western Mongolia, Western China; Partial: Northern Canada, Greenland, Europe, Asia		^{[a]}
January 26, 2009	07:59:45	131	Annular	−0.282	0.9282	7:54	34.1°S 70.2°E	280	170	Annular: Cocos Islands, Southern Sumatra, Western Java, Borneo; Partial: Southern Africa, East Antarctica, Southeast Asia, Philippines, Australia		^{[a]}
July 22, 2009	02:36:25	136	Total	0.0698	1.0799	6:39	24.2°N 144.1°E	258	160	Total: Pakistan, India, Nepal, Bhutan, Bangladesh, Myanmar, China, Northern Ryukyu Islands; Partial: Southeast Asia, East Asia, Northern Oceania, Hawaii		^{[a]}
January 15, 2010	07:07:39	141	Annular	0.4002	0.919	11:08	1.6°N 69.3°E	333	207	Annular: Central African Republic, Democratic Republic of the Congo, Uganda, Maldives, southeastern India, Pakistan, Sri Lanka, Myanmar, central China; Partial: Africa, Southeastern Europe, Middle East, Asia		^{[a]}
July 11, 2010	19:34:38	146	Total	−0.6788	1.058	5:20	19.7°S 121.9°W	259	161	Total: Southern Chile and Argentina, Southeastern Polynesia; Partial: Southwestern South America, French Polynesia, Hawaii		^{[a]}
January 4, 2011	08:51:42	151	Partial	1.0627	0.8576	—	64.7°N 20.8°E	—		Partial: Europe, Northern Africa, Central Asia, Middle East		^{[a]}
June 1, 2011	21:17:18	118	Partial	1.213	0.601	—	67.8°N 46.8°E	—		Partial: Northeast Asia, Alaska, Northern Canada, Greenland, Northern Scandinavia, Iceland		^{[a]}
July 1, 2011	08:39:30	156	Partial	−1.4917	0.0971	—	65.2°S 28.6°E	—		Partial: Southern Indian Ocean near Antarctica		^{[a]}
November 25, 2011	06:21:24	123	Partial	−1.0536	0.9047	—	68.6°S 82.4°W	—		Partial: Southwestern South Africa, Antarctica, Tasmania, New Zealand		^{[a]}
May 20, 2012	23:53:54	128	Annular	0.4828	0.9439	5:46	49.1°N 176.3°E	237	147	Annular: Southern China, Hong Kong, Macau, Japan, Oregon, California, Nevada, Utah, Arizona, New Mexico, Texas; Partial: East Asia, Hawaii, Western North America		^{[a]}
November 13, 2012	22:12:55	133	Total	−0.3719	1.05	4:02	40.0°S 161.3°W	179	111	Total: Northern Australia; Partial: Australia, New Zealand, Oceania, West Antarctica, Antarctic Peninsula, Southern South America		^{[a]}
May 10, 2013	00:26:20	138	Annular	−0.2694	0.9544	6:03	2.2°N 175.5°E	173	107	Annular: Western Australia, Northern Territory and Queensland, Australia, Louisiade Archipelago, Solomon Islands, Kiribati; Partial: Indonesia, Australia, New Zealand, Oceania, Hawaii		^{[a]}
November 3, 2013	12:47:36	143	Hybrid	0.3272	1.0159	1:40	3.5°N 11.7°W	58	36	Total: Gabon, Republic of the Congo, Democratic Republic of the Congo, Uganda, Kenya, Ethiopia; Partial: Eastern North America, Caribbean, Eastern South America, Southern Europe, Africa, Middle East		^{[a]}
April 29, 2014	06:04:33	148	Annular (non-central)	−1.00001	0.9868	—	70.6°S 131.3°E	—		Annular: Western Wilkes Land; Partial: Australia, East Antarctica		^{[a]}
October 23, 2014	21:45:39	153	Partial	1.0908	0.8114	—	71.2°N 97.2°W	—		Partial: Eastern Russia and North America		^{[a]}
March 20, 2015	09:46:47	120	Total	0.9454	1.0445	2:47	64.4°N 6.6°W	463	288	Total: Faroe Islands, Svalbard, North Pole; Partial: Greenland, Europe, North Africa, Central Asia, Western Russia		^{[a]}
September 13, 2015	06:55:19	125	Partial	−1.1004	0.7875	—	72.1°S 2.3°W	—		Partial: Southern Africa, East Antarctica		^{[a]}
March 9, 2016	01:58:19	130	Total	0.2609	1.045	4:09	10.1°N 148.8°E	155	96	Total: Indonesia, Micronesia, Marshall Islands; Partial: Southeast Asia, East Asia, Alaska, Northwestern Australia, Hawaii		^{[a]}
September 1, 2016	09:08:02	135	Annular	−0.333	0.9736	3:06	10.7°S 37.8°E	100	62	Annular: Gabon, Congo, Democratic Republic of the Congo, Tanzania, Mozambique, Madagascar, Réunion; Partial: Africa, Antarctica		^{[a]}
February 26, 2017	14:54:33	140	Annular	−0.4578	0.9922	0:44	34.7°S 31.2°W	31	19	Annular: Southern Chile and Argentina, Angola, Southwestern Katanga; Partial: Southern South America, Southern and Western Africa, Antarctica		^{[a]}
August 21, 2017	18:26:40	145	Total	0.4367	1.0306	2:40	37.0°N 87.7°W	115	71	Total: Oregon, Idaho, Montana, (Note: The totality path passes through about 5 miles of Montana at the southernmost point on its border with Idaho. The furthest the path gets is 4 miles from the border.) Wyoming, Nebraska, Kansas, Missouri, Iowa, (Note: It passes through less than 2 miles of Iowa in its southwest corner.) Illinois, Kentucky, Tennessee, North Carolina, Georgia, South Carolina; Partial: Northeast Asia, Hawaii, North America, Central America, Caribbean, Northern South America, Western Europe, West Africa		^{[a]}
February 15, 2018	20:52:33	150	Partial	−1.2116	0.5991	—	71.0°S 0.6°E	—		Partial: Antarctica, Southern South America		^{[a]}
July 13, 2018	03:02:16	117	Partial	−1.3542	0.3365	—	67.9°S 127.4°E	—		Partial: Antarctica, Southern Australia, Tasmania, Stewart Island		^{[a]}
August 11, 2018	09:47:28	155	Partial	1.1476	0.7368	—	70.4°N 174.5°E	—		Partial: Northeastern Canada, Greenland, Northern Europe, Northern Asia		^{[a]}
January 6, 2019	01:42:38	122	Partial	1.1417	0.7145	—	67.4°N 153.6°E	—		Partial: Northeast Asia, Southwestern Alaska		^{[a]}
July 2, 2019	19:24:08	127	Total	−0.6466	1.0459	4:33	17.4°S 109.0°W	201	125	Total: Pitcairn Islands, Tuamotu Archipelago, Central Chile and Argentina; Partial: Eastern Oceania, South America, Southern Central America		^{[a]}
December 26, 2019	05:18:53	132	Annular	0.4135	0.9701	3:40	1.0°N 102.3°E	118	73	Annular: Saudi Arabia, Qatar, United Arab Emirates, Oman, Southern India, Sri Lanka, Malaysia, Indonesia, Singapore, Northern Mariana Islands, Guam; Partial: East Africa, Asia, Northern Australia		^{[a]}
June 21, 2020	06:41:15	137	Annular	0.1209	0.994	0:38	30.5°N 79.7°E	21	13	Annular: Democratic Republic of the Congo, South Sudan, Ethiopia, Eritrea, Yemen, Saudi Arabia, Oman, Pakistan, Northern India, Tibet, southern China, Taiwan; Partial: Africa, Southeast Europe, Asia, Northern Australia		^{[a]}
December 14, 2020	16:14:39	142	Total	−0.2939	1.0254	2:10	40.3°S 67.9°W	90	56	Total: Southern Chile and Argentina; Partial: Central and Southern South America, Southern Africa, Antarctica		^{[a]}
June 10, 2021	10:43:07	147	Annular	0.9152	0.9435	3:51	80.8°N 66.8°W	527	327	Annular: Ontario, Nunavut, Greenland, North Pole, Russian Far East; Partial: Northern North America, Europe, North Asia		^{[a]}
December 4, 2021	07:34:38	152	Total	−0.9526	1.0367	1:54	76.8°S 46.2°W	419	260	Total: Antarctica; Partial: Southern Africa, Antarctica, Tasmania		^{[a]}
April 30, 2022	20:42:36	119	Partial	−1.1901	0.6396	—	62.1°S 71.5°W	—		Partial: Southern and Central South America, Antarctica		^{[a]}
October 25, 2022	11:01:20	124	Partial	1.0701	0.8623	—	61.6°N 77.4°E	—		Partial: Europe, Central Asia, West Asia, South Asia, Northeast Africa		^{[a]}
April 20, 2023	04:17:56	129	Hybrid	−0.3952	1.0132	1:16	9.6°S 125.8°E	49	30	Total: Western Australia, East Timor, Indonesia; Partial: Antarctica, Australia, Oceania, Southeast Asia		^{[a]}
October 14, 2023	18:00:41	134	Annular	0.3753	0.952	5:17	11.4°N 83.1°W	187	116	Annular: Oregon, California, Nevada, Idaho, Utah, Arizona, Colorado, New Mexico, Texas, Yucatán Peninsula, Belize, Honduras, Nicaragua, Costa Rica, Panama, Colombia, Brazil; Partial: North America, Central America, Caribbean, South America		^{[a]}
April 8, 2024	18:18:29	139	Total	0.3431	1.0566	4:28	25.3°N 104.1°W	198	123	Total: Mexico, Texas, Oklahoma, Arkansas, Missouri, Tennessee, (Note: The totality path crosses over 10 miles in Tennessee, in the Kentucky Bend area, around 3 miles north of Tiptonville.) Kentucky, Illinois, Indiana, Ohio, Michigan, Pennsylvania, New York, Vermont, New Hampshire, Maine, Eastern Canada; Partial: Eastern Oceania, Hawaii, North America, Central America, Caribbean, Iceland, British Isles		^{[a]}
October 2, 2024	18:46:13	144	Annular	−0.3509	0.9326	7:25	22.0°S 114.5°W	266	165	Annular: Easter Island, Southern Chile, Southern Argentina; Partial: Hawaii, Eastern Oceania, Southern and Central South America, Antarctica		^{[a]}
March 29, 2025	10:48:36	149	Partial	1.0405	0.9376	—	61.1°N 77.1°W	—		Partial: Northeastern United States, Eastern Canada, Greenland, Europe, Northwest Africa, Northern Russia		^{[a]}
September 21, 2025	19:43:04	154	Partial	−1.0651	0.855	—	60.9°S 153.5°E	—		Partial: Oceania, New Zealand, Antarctica		^{[a]}
February 17, 2026	12:13:06	121	Annular	−0.9743	0.963	2:20	64.7°S 86.8°E	616	383	Annular: Antarctica; Partial: Southern Argentina and Chile, Southern Africa, Antarctica		^{[a]}
August 12, 2026	17:47:06	126	Total	0.8977	1.0386	2:18	65.2°N 25.2°W	294	183	Total: Greenland, Iceland, Spain, Northeastern Portugal; Partial: Northern North America, Europe, West Africa		^{[a]}
February 6, 2027	16:00:48	131	Annular	−0.2952	0.9281	7:51	31.3°S 48.5°W	282	175	Annular: Chile, Argentina, Atlantic; Partial: South America, Antarctica, West and South Africa		^{[a]}
August 2, 2027	10:07:50	136	Total	0.1421	1.079	6:23	25.5°N 33.2°E	258	160	Total: Morocco, Spain, Algeria, Tunisia, Libya, Egypt, Saudi Arabia, Yemen, Somalia; Partial: Africa, Europe, Middle East, South Asia, Southeast Asia		^{[a]}
January 26, 2028	15:08:59	141	Annular	0.3901	0.9208	10:27	3.0°N 51.5°W	323	201	Annular: Ecuador, Peru, Colombia, Brazil, French Guiana, Portugal, Spain; Partial: Central and Northern South America, Central America, Caribbean, Eastern North America, Western Europe, West Africa		^{[a]}
July 22, 2028	02:56:40	146	Total	−0.6056	1.056	5:10	15.6°S 126.7°E	230	140	Total: Australia, New Zealand; Partial: Southeast Asia, Australia, Oceania		^{[a]}
January 14, 2029	17:13:48	151	Partial	1.0553	0.8714	—	63.7°N 114.2°W	—		Partial: North America, Central America		^{[a]}
June 12, 2029	04:06:13	118	Partial	1.2943	0.4576	—	66.8°N 66.2°W	—		Partial: Northern and Central Europe, Northern Russia, Greenland, Alaska, Northwestern Canada		^{[a]}
July 11, 2029	15:37:19	156	Partial	−1.4191	0.2303	—	64.3°S 85.6°W	—		Partial: Southern Chile and Argentina		^{[a]}
December 5, 2029	15:03:58	123	Partial	−1.0609	0.8911	—	67.5°S 135.7°E	—		Partial: Extreme Southern Argentina and Chile, Antarctica		^{[a]}
June 1, 2030	06:29:13	128	Annular	0.5626	0.9443	5:21	56.5°N 80.1°E	250	160	Annular: Algeria, Tunisia, Libya, Malta, Greece, Turkey, Bulgaria, Ukraine, Russia, Kazakhstan, China, Japan; Partial: North Africa, Europe, Asia, Alaska, Northern Canada		^{[a]}
November 25, 2030	06:51:37	133	Total	−0.3867	1.0468	3:44	43.6°S 71.2°E	169	105	Total: Namibia, Botswana, South Africa, Lesotho, Australia; Partial: Central Africa, Southern Africa, Antarctica, Australia, Indonesia		^{[a]}
May 21, 2031	07:16:04	138	Annular	−0.197	0.9589	5:26	8.9°N 71.7°E	152	94	Annular: Angola, Zambia, Democratic Republic of the Congo, Tanzania, India, Sri Lanka, Andaman and Nicobar Islands, Thailand, Malaysia, Indonesia; Partial: Africa, Middle East, South Asia, Southeast Asia, Australia		^{[a]}
November 14, 2031	21:07:31	143	Hybrid	0.3078	1.0106	1:08	0.6°S 137.6°W	38	24	Annular: Panama; Partial: Oceania, Hawaii, Southern North America, Central America, Caribbean, Northwestern South America		^{[a]}
May 9, 2032	13:26:42	148	Annular	−0.9375	0.9957	0:22	51.3°S 7.1°W	44	27	Annular: None; Partial: Southern South America, Southern Africa		^{[a]}
November 3, 2032	05:34:13	153	Partial	1.0643	0.8554	—	70.4°N 132.6°E	—		Partial: Asia, Eastern Europe		^{[a]}
March 30, 2033	18:02:36	120	Total	0.9778	1.0462	2:37	71.3°N 155.8°W	781	485	Total: Russian Far East, Alaska; Partial: Eastern Russia, Hawaii, North America, Greenland, Iceland		^{[a]}
September 23, 2033	13:54:31	125	Partial	−1.1583	0.689	—	72.2°S 121.2°W	—		Partial: Southern South America, Antarctica		^{[a]}
March 20, 2034	10:18:45	130	Total	0.2894	1.0458	4:09	16.1°N 22.2°E	159	99	Total: Nigeria, Cameroon, Chad, Sudan, Egypt, Saudi Arabia, Kuwait, Iran, Afghanistan, Pakistan, India, China; Partial: Eastern Brazil, Africa, Europe, Middle East, Central Asia, South Asia		^{[a]}
September 12, 2034	16:19:28	135	Annular	−0.3936	0.9736	2:58	18.2°S 72.6°W	102	63	Annular: Chile, Bolivia, Argentina, Paraguay, Brazil; Partial: Central America, Caribbean, South America, Antarctica		^{[a]}
March 9, 2035	23:05:54	140	Annular	−0.4368	0.9919	0:48	29.0°S 154.9°W	31	19	Annular: New Zealand; Partial: Australia, Oceania, Antarctica, Central Mexico		^{[a]}
September 2, 2035	01:56:46	145	Total	0.3727	1.032	2:54	29.1°N 158.0°E	116	72	Total: Northern China, North Korea, Japan; Partial: Asia, Northern Oceania, Hawaii, Alaska, Western United States		^{[a]}
February 27, 2036	04:46:49	150	Partial	−1.1942	0.6286	—	71.6°S 131.4°W	—		Partial: Antarctica, Southeastern Australia, New Zealand		^{[a]}
July 23, 2036	10:32:06	117	Partial	−1.425	0.1991	—	68.9°S 3.6°E	—		Partial: Northern East Antarctica		^{[a]}
August 21, 2036	17:25:45	155	Partial	1.0825	0.8622	—	71.1°N 47.0°E	—		Partial: Russian Far East, Alaska, Canada, Greenland, Western Europe, Northwest Africa		^{[a]}
January 16, 2037	09:48:55	122	Partial	1.1477	0.7049	—	68.5°N 20.8°E	—		Partial: Europe, North Africa, the Middle East, Central Asia		^{[a]}
July 13, 2037	02:40:36	127	Total	−0.7246	1.0413	3:58	24.8°S 139.1°E	201	125	Total: Australia and New Zealand; Partial: Indonesia, Australia, Oceania		^{[a]}
January 5, 2038	13:47:11	132	Annular	0.4169	0.9728	3:18	2.1°N 25.4°W	107	66	Annular: Cuba, Haiti, Dominican Republic, Saint Lucia, Saint Vincent and the Grenadines, Barbados, Liberia, Côte d'Ivoire, Ghana, Togo, Benin, Nigeria, Niger, Chad, Libya, Sudan, Egypt; Partial: Eastern North America, Central America, Caribbean, Northern South America, Europe, Africa		^{[a]}
July 2, 2038	13:32:55	137	Annular	0.0398	0.9911	1:00	25.4°N 21.9°W	31	19	Annular: Colombia, Venezuela, Grenada, Barbados, Western Sahara, Mauritania, Mali, Algeria, Niger, Chad, Sudan, South Sudan, Ethiopia, Kenya, Somalia; Partial: Eastern North America, Central America, Caribbean, Northern South America, Africa, Western Europe, Middle East		^{[a]}
December 26, 2038	01:00:10	142	Total	−0.2881	1.0268	2:18	40.3°S 164.0°E	95	59	Total: Australia, New Zealand; Partial: Southeast Asia, Australia, Antarctica, Oceania		^{[a]}
June 21, 2039	17:12:54	147	Annular	0.8312	0.9454	4:05	78.9°N 102.1°W	365	227	Annular: Alaska, Northern Canada, Greenland, Norway, Sweden, Finland, Estonia, Latvia, Lithuania, Western Russia, Belarus; Partial: Hawaii, North America, Europe, Northwest Africa, Northern Russia		^{[a]}
December 15, 2039	16:23:46	152	Total	−0.9458	1.0356	1:51	80.9°S 172.8°E	380	240	Total: Antarctica; Partial: Extreme Southern South America, Southern South Africa, Antarctica		^{[a]}
May 11, 2040	03:43:02	119	Partial	−1.2529	0.5306	—	62.8°S 174.4°E	—		Partial: Australia, New Zealand, Oceania, Antarctica		^{[a]}
November 4, 2040	19:09:02	124	Partial	1.0993	0.8074	—	62.2°N 53.4°W	—		Partial: North America, Central America, Caribbean, Northern South America		^{[a]}
April 30, 2041	11:52:21	129	Total	−0.4492	1.0189	1:51	9.6°S 12.2°E	72	45	Total: Angola, Democratic Republic of the Congo, Uganda, Kenya, Somalia; Partial: Eastern South America, Africa, Antarctica, Middle East, South Asia		^{[a]}
October 25, 2041	01:36:22	134	Annular	0.4133	0.9467	6:07	9.9°N 162.9°E	213	132	Annular: Mongolia, Northeastern China, North Korea, Japan, Marshall Islands, Kiribati; Partial: East Asia, Southeast Asia, Northeastern Australia, Oceania, Hawaii		^{[a]}
April 20, 2042	02:17:30	139	Total	0.2956	1.0614	4:51	27.0°N 137.3°E	210	130	Total: Western Indonesia, Eastern Malaysia, Brunei, Philippines; Partial: South Asia, Southeast Asia, Northern Australia, East Asia, Northeast Asia, Hawaii, Northwestern North America		^{[a]}
October 14, 2042	02:00:42	144	Annular	−0.303	0.93	7:44	23.7°S 137.8°E	273	170	Annular: Andaman and Nicobar Islands, Thailand, Malaysia, Indonesia, East Timor, Australia, New Zealand; Partial: Southeast Asia, Australia, Oceania, Antarctica		^{[a]}
April 9, 2043	18:57:49	149	Total (non-central)	1.0031	1.0095	—	61.3°N 152.0°E	—		Total: Russian Far East; Partial: Eastern Russia, Alaska, Hawaii, Canada, Northwestern United States, Greenland, Iceland		^{[a]}
October 3, 2043	03:01:49	154	Annular (non-central)	1.0102	0.9497	—	61.0°S 35.3°E	—		Annular: None; Partial: Madagascar, Antarctica, Southwestern Australia		^{[a]}
February 28, 2044	20:24:40	121	Annular	−0.9954	0.96	2:27	62.2°S 25.6°W	—		Annular: None; Partial: Antarctica, South America		^{[a]}
August 23, 2044	01:17:02	126	Total	0.9613	1.0364	2:04	64.3°N 120.4°W	453	281	Total: Greenland, Nunavut, Northwest Territories, British Columbia, Alberta, Saskatchewan, Montana, North Dakota, South Dakota; Partial: Northern Russia, Alaska, Western Canada, Western United States, Hawaii		^{[a]}
February 16, 2045	23:56:07	131	Annular	−0.3125	0.9285	7:47	28.3°S 166.2°W	281	175	Annular: New Zealand, Cook Islands, French Polynesia, Kiribati; Partial: Australia, Antarctica, Oceania, Hawaii, Southwestern North America		^{[a]}
August 12, 2045	17:42:39	136	Total	0.2116	1.0774	6:06	25.9°N 78.5°W	256	159	Total: California, Nevada, Utah, Colorado, New Mexico, (Note: The totality path crosses through 9 miles of New Mexico, only getting as far as 2 miles away from the border, either with Colorado or Oklahoma.) Kansas, Oklahoma, Texas, Arkansas, Louisiana, Mississippi, Alabama, Georgia, Florida, Bahamas, Turks and Caicos Islands, Dominican Republic, Haiti, Venezuela, Trinidad and Tobago, Guyana, Suriname, French Guiana, Brazil; Partial: Russian Far East, Hawaii, North America, Central America, Caribbean, Northern and Central South America, West Africa		^{[a]}
February 5, 2046	23:06:26	141	Annular	0.3765	0.9232	9:42	4.8°N 171.4°W	310	190	Annular: Eastern Indonesia, Papua New Guinea, Solomon Islands, Kiribati, Hawaii, California, Oregon, Nevada, Idaho; Partial: Indonesia, Philippines, Japan, Australia, Oceania, Western North America		^{[a]}
August 2, 2046	10:21:13	146	Total	−0.535	1.0531	4:51	12.7°S 15.2°E	206	128	Total: Eastern Brazil, Angola, Namibian Panhandle, Botswana, South Africa, Eswatini, Southern Mozambique, Kerguelen Islands; Partial: Eastern South America, Africa, East Antarctica		^{[a]}
January 26, 2047	01:33:18	151	Partial	1.045	0.8907	—	62.9°N 111.7°E	—		Partial: East Asia, Southeast Asia, Southwestern Alaska		^{[a]}
June 23, 2047	10:52:31	118	Partial	1.3766	0.3129	—	65.8°N 178.0°W	—		Partial: Northern Canada, Northern Alaska, Northern Greenland, Northeast Asia		^{[a]}
July 22, 2047	22:36:17	156	Partial	−1.3477	0.3604	—	63.4°S 160.2°E	—		Partial: Southeastern Australia, New Zealand		^{[a]}
December 16, 2047	23:50:12	123	Partial	−1.0661	0.8816	—	66.4°S 6.6°W	—		Partial: Antarctica, Southern Chile and Argentina		^{[a]}
June 11, 2048	12:58:53	128	Annular	0.6468	0.9441	4:58	63.7°N 11.5°W	272	169	Annular: Colorado, Kansas, Nebraska, Missouri, Iowa, Minnesota, Illinois, Wisconsin, Michigan, Eastern Canada, Greenland, Iceland, Faroe Islands, Norway, Sweden, Estonia, Latvia, Lithuania, Belarus, Western Russia, Ukraine, Kazakhstan, Uzbekistan, Turkmenistan, Tajikistan, Afghanistan, Pakistan; Partial: North America, Central America, Caribbean, Europe, North Africa, Middle East, Central Asia		^{[a]}
December 5, 2048	15:35:27	133	Total	−0.3973	1.044	3:28	46.1°S 56.4°W	160	99	Total: Chile, Argentina, Namibia, Botswana; Partial: Southern and Central South America, Antarctica, Southern Africa		^{[a]}
May 31, 2049	13:59:59	138	Annular	−0.1187	0.9631	4:45	15.3°N 29.9°W	134	83	Annular: Peru, Ecuador, Colombia, Brazil, Venezuela, Guyana, Suriname, Cape Verde, Senegal, Gambia, Mali, Guinea, Burkina Faso, Côte d'Ivoire, Ghana, Togo, Benin, Nigeria, Cameroon, Congo, Democratic Republic of the Congo, Burundi, Tanzania; Partial: Central America, Caribbean, Northern and Central South America, Southeastern United States, Africa, Southern Europe, Middle East		^{[a]}
November 25, 2049	05:33:48	143	Hybrid	0.2943	1.0057	0:38	3.8°S 95.2°E	21	13	Total: Indonesia; Annular: Saudi Arabia, Yemen, Micronesia; Partial: East Africa, Middle East, Central Asia, South Asia, Southeast Asia, Australia		^{[a]}
May 20, 2050	20:42:50	148	Hybrid	−0.8688	1.0038	0:21	40.1°S 123.7°W	27	17	Hybrid: None; Partial: New Zealand, Eastern Oceania, Western South America		^{[a]}
November 14, 2050	13:30:53	153	Partial	1.0447	0.8874	—	69.5°N 1.0°E	—		Partial: Northeastern United States, Eastern Canada, Greenland, Europe, West Africa, North Africa		^{[a]}
April 11, 2051	02:10:39	120	Partial	1.0169	0.9849	—	71.6°N 32.2°E	—		Partial: Asia, Alaska, Western Canada		^{[a]}
October 4, 2051	21:02:14	125	Partial	−1.2094	0.6024	—	72.0°S 117.7°E	—		Partial: Southeastern Australia, New Zealand, Antarctica		^{[a]}
March 30, 2052	18:31:53	130	Total	0.3238	1.0466	4:08	22.4°N 102.5°W	164	102	Total: Central Mexico, Southern Texas, Louisiana, Alabama, Florida, Georgia, South Carolina; Partial: Hawaii, North America, Central America, Caribbean, Northern South America		^{[a]}
September 22, 2052	23:39:10	135	Annular	−0.448	0.9734	2:51	25.7°S 175.0°E	106	66	Annular: Southern Indonesia, East Timor, Northern Queensland, New Caledonia; Partial: Australia, Indonesia, Philippines, Oceania, Antarctica		^{[a]}
March 20, 2053	07:08:19	140	Annular	−0.4089	0.9919	0:50	23.0°S 83.0°E	31	19	Annular: Southern Indonesia; Partial: Southern Africa, Southeast Asia, Australia, Antarctica		^{[a]}
September 12, 2053	09:34:09	145	Total	0.314	1.0328	3:04	21.5°N 41.7°E	116	72	Total: Spain, Morocco, Algeria, Tunisia, Libya, Egypt, Saudi Arabia, Yemen, Maldives, Western Indonesia; Partial: North and Central Africa, Europe, Middle East, Central Asia, South Asia, Southeast Asia		^{[a]}
March 9, 2054	12:33:40	150	Partial	−1.1711	0.6678	—	72.0°S 97.9°E	—		Partial: Antarctica, South Africa, Southern Madagascar		^{[a]}
August 3, 2054	18:04:02	117	Partial	−1.4941	0.0655	—	69.8°S 121.3°W	—		Partial: Antarctica		^{[a]}
September 2, 2054	01:09:34	155	Partial	1.0215	0.9793	—	71.7°N 82.3°W	—		Partial: Northeast Asia, Alaska, Western Canada, Western United States		^{[a]}
January 27, 2055	17:54:05	122	Partial	1.155	0.6932	—	69.5°N 112.2°W	—		Partial: North America		^{[a]}
July 24, 2055	09:57:50	127	Total	−0.8012	1.0359	3:17	33.3°S 25.8°E	202	126	Total: South Africa; Partial: Southern and Central Africa		^{[a]}
January 16, 2056	22:16:45	132	Annular	0.4199	0.9759	2:52	3.9°N 153.5°W	95	59	Annular: Marshall Islands, Northern Mexico, Texas; Partial: Oceania, Hawaii, Western and Central North America, Central America		^{[a]}
July 12, 2056	20:21:59	137	Annular	−0.0426	0.9878	1:26	19.4°N 123.7°W	43	27	Annular: Kiribati, Ecuador, Colombia, Northern Peru, Western Brazil; Partial: Oceania, Hawaii, United States, Mexico, Central America, Caribbean, Western South America		^{[a]}
January 5, 2057	09:47:52	142	Total	−0.2837	1.0287	2:29	39.2°S 35.2°E	102	63	Total: None; Partial: Eastern South America, Southern Africa, Antarctica, Southeast Asia, Western Australia		^{[a]}
July 1, 2057	23:40:15	147	Annular	0.7455	0.9464	4:23	71.5°N 176.2°W	298	185	Annular: Northwest China, Mongolia, Eastern Russia, Alaska, Western and Central Canada, Minnesota, Michigan, Western New York; Partial: East Asia, Northeast Asia, Northern Europe, North America		^{[a]}
December 26, 2057	01:14:35	152	Total	−0.9405	1.0348	1:50	84.9°S 21.8°E	355	221	Total: Antarctica; Partial: Antarctica		^{[a]}
May 22, 2058	10:39:25	119	Partial	−1.3194	0.4141	—	63.5°S 61.1°E	—		Partial: Antarctica, Southern South Africa, Southern Madagascar		^{[a]}
June 21, 2058	00:19:35	157	Partial	1.4869	0.126	—	65.9°N 9.9°E	—		Partial: Western Russia, Scandinavia, Greenland		^{[a]}
November 16, 2058	03:23:07	124	Partial	1.1224	0.7644	—	62.9°N 174.2°E	—		Partial: Northeast Asia		^{[a]}
May 11, 2059	19:22:16	129	Total	−0.508	1.0242	2:23	10.7°S 100.4°W	95	59	Total: Ecuador, Peru, Southern Colombia, Brazil; Partial: Eastern Oceania, South America, Central America, Caribbean		^{[a]}
November 5, 2059	09:18:15	134	Annular	0.4454	0.9417	7:00	8.7°N 47.1°E	238	148	Annular: France, Spain, Andorra, Italy, Libya, Egypt, Sudan, Eritrea, Yemen, Ethiopia, Somalia, Maldives, Western Indonesia; Partial: Europe, Africa, Asia		^{[a]}
April 30, 2060	10:10:00	139	Total	0.2422	1.066	5:15	28.0°N 20.9°E	222	138	Total: Côte d'Ivoire, Ghana, Togo, Benin, Burkina Faso, Nigeria, Niger, Chad, Libya, Egypt, Cyprus, Turkey, Syria, Armenia, Azerbaijan, Iran, Turkmenistan, Uzbekistan, Kazakhstan, Kyrgyzstan, China; Partial: Eastern Brazil, Africa, Europe, Asia		^{[a]}
October 24, 2060	09:24:10	144	Annular	−0.2625	0.9277	8:06	25.8°S 28.1°E	281	175	Annular: Guinea, Sierra Leone, Liberia, Côte d'Ivoire, Annobón Natural Reserve, Angola, Namibia, Botswana, South Africa; Partial: Eastern Brazil, Africa, Antarctica		^{[a]}
April 20, 2061	02:56:49	149	Total	0.9578	1.0475	2:37	64.5°N 59.2°E	559	347	Total: Eastern Ukraine, Russia, Western Kazakhstan, Svalbard; Partial: Eastern Europe, Asia, Alaska, Northwestern Canada		^{[a]}
October 13, 2061	10:32:10	154	Annular	−0.9639	0.9469	3:41	62.1°S 54.4°W	743	462	Annular: Southern Chile and Argentina, Falkland Islands, Antarctica; Partial: South America, Antarctica		^{[a]}
March 11, 2062	04:26:16	121	Partial	−1.0238	0.9331	—	61.0°S 147.1°W	—		Partial: Antarctica, Eastern Australia, New Zealand, Oceania		^{[a]}
September 3, 2062	08:54:27	126	Partial	1.0191	0.9749	—	61.3°N 150.3°E	—		Partial: Greenland, Northern Europe, Asia		^{[a]}
February 28, 2063	07:43:30	131	Annular	−0.336	0.9293	7:41	25.2°S 77.7°E	280	170	Annular: Prince Edward Islands, Western Indonesia, Malaysia, Brunei, Southern Philippines; Partial: Southern Africa, Antarctica, Australia, Southeast Asia		^{[a]}
August 24, 2063	01:22:11	136	Total	0.2771	1.075	5:49	25.6°N 168.4°E	252	157	Total: Northern China, Mongolia, North Korea, Southern Primorsky Krai of Russia, Northern Japan, French Polynesia; Partial: East Asia, North Asia, Hawaii, Oceania		^{[a]}
February 17, 2064	07:00:23	141	Annular	0.3597	0.9262	8:56	7.0°N 69.7°E	295	183	Annular: Southeastern Congo, Northern Angola, Democratic Republic of the Congo, Northern Zambia, Tanzania, Seychelles, India, Nepal, Northwestern Bangladesh, Bhutan, China; Partial: Africa, Asia		^{[a]}
August 12, 2064	17:46:06	146	Total	−0.4652	1.0495	4:28	10.9°S 96.0°W	184	114	Total: Chile and Argentina; Partial: Eastern Oceania, Mexico, Central America, South America, Antarctica		^{[a]}
February 5, 2065	09:52:26	151	Partial	1.0336	0.9123	—	62.2°N 21.9°W	—		Partial: North Africa, West Africa, Europe, Central Asia		^{[a]}
July 3, 2065	17:33:52	118	Partial	1.4619	0.1638	—	64.8°N 71.9°E	—		Partial: Northern Europe, Northern Russia		^{[a]}
August 2, 2065	05:34:17	156	Partial	−1.2759	0.4903	—	62.7°S 46.5°E	—		Partial: Eastern South Africa, Southern Madagascar, Antarctica		^{[a]}
December 27, 2065	08:39:56	123	Partial	−1.0688	0.8769	—	65.4°S 149.2°W	—		Partial: Antarctica, Southern Australia		^{[a]}
June 22, 2066	19:25:48	128	Annular	0.733	0.9435	4:40	70.1°N 96.4°W	309	192	Annular: Russian Far East, Alaska, Northern Canada, Azores; Partial: Northern Russia, Canada, Greenland, United States, Caribbean, Northern Europe, Western Europe		^{[a]}
December 17, 2066	00:23:40	133	Total	−0.4043	1.0416	3:14	47.4°S 175.8°E	152	94	Total: Southwestern Australia, Stewart Island; Partial: Indonesia, Australia, Antarctica, Oceania		^{[a]}
June 11, 2067	20:42:26	138	Annular	−0.0387	0.967	4:05	21.0°N 130.2°W	119	74	Annular: Kiribati, Ecuador, Peru, Southern Colombia, Western Brazil; Partial: Oceania, Hawaii, Southern North America, Central America, Caribbean, Western South America		^{[a]}
December 6, 2067	14:03:43	143	Hybrid	0.2845	1.0011	0:08	6.0°S 32.4°W	4	2.5	Total: Brazil; Annular: Southeastern Mexico, Guatemala, Belize, Honduras, Nicaragua, Colombia, Venezuela, Brazil, Guyana, Nigeria, Cameroon, Chad, Sudan; Partial: Eastern North America, Central America, Caribbean, Northern and Central South America, Southern Europe, Africa		^{[a]}
May 31, 2068	03:56:39	148	Total	−0.797	1.011	1:06	31.0°S 123.2°E	63	39	Total: Australia, New Zealand; Partial: Australia, Indonesia, Antarctica, Western Oceania		^{[a]}
November 24, 2068	21:32:30	153	Partial	1.0299	0.9109	—	68.5°N 131.1°W	—		Partial: Russian Far East, North America		^{[a]}
April 21, 2069	10:11:09	120	Partial	1.0624	0.8992	—	71.0°N 101.3°W	—		Partial: Eastern Canada, Greenland, Europe, North Asia		^{[a]}
May 20, 2069	17:53:18	158	Partial	−1.4852	0.0879	—	68.8°S 69.9°W	—		Partial: Antarctic Peninsula, Extreme Southern Chile and Argentina		^{[a]}
October 15, 2069	04:19:56	125	Partial	−1.2524	0.5298	—	71.6°S 5.5°W	—		Partial: Antarctica		^{[a]}
April 11, 2070	02:36:09	130	Total	0.3652	1.0472	4:04	29.1°N 135.1°E	168	104	Total: Sri Lanka, Andaman and Nicobar Islands, Myanmar, Thailand, Cambodia, Laos, Vietnam, Southern Taiwan, Nanpō Islands; Partial: Asia, Alaska, Hawaii, Western Canada		^{[a]}
October 4, 2070	07:08:57	135	Annular	−0.495	0.9731	2:44	32.8°S 60.4°E	110	68	Annular: Angola, Zambia, Zimbabwe, Mozambique, Madagascar; Partial: Central Africa, Southern Africa, East Africa, Antarctica, Australia		^{[a]}
March 31, 2071	15:01:06	140	Annular	−0.3739	0.9919	0:52	16.7°S 37.0°W	31	19	Annular: Chile, Argentina, Brazil, Congo, Democratic Republic of the Congo; Partial: South America, Antarctica, Africa		^{[a]}
September 23, 2071	17:20:28	145	Total	0.262	1.0333	3:11	14.2°N 76.7°W	116	72	Total: Northern Mexico, Northern Colombia, Venezuela, Guyana, Northern Brazil, Suriname, French Guiana; Partial: Hawaii, North America, Central America, Caribbean, Northern and Central South America, West Africa		^{[a]}
March 19, 2072	20:10:31	150	Partial	−1.1405	0.7199	—	72.2°S 30.4°W	—		Partial: Antarctica, Southern South America		^{[a]}
September 12, 2072	08:59:20	155	Total	0.9655	1.0558	3:13	69.8°N 102.0°E	732	455	Total: Northern and Eastern Russia; Partial: Greenland, Europe, Asia		^{[a]}
February 7, 2073	01:55:59	122	Partial	1.1651	0.6768	—	70.5°N 114.9°E	—		Partial: East Asia, Northeast Asia, Western Alaska		^{[a]}
August 3, 2073	17:15:23	127	Total	−0.8763	1.0294	2:29	43.2°S 89.4°W	206	128	Total: Southern Chile and Argentina; Partial: Central and Southern South America, Antarctic Peninsula		^{[a]}
January 27, 2074	06:44:15	132	Annular	0.4251	0.9798	2:21	6.6°N 78.8°E	79	49	Annular: Eastern Chad, Sudan, Northern South Sudan, Ethiopia, Somalia, Maldives, Sri Lanka, Andaman and Nicobar Islands, Myanmar, Thailand, Laos, Vietnam, Southeastern China, Southwestern Japan; Partial: Central Africa, East Africa, Eastern Europe, Asia		^{[a]}
July 24, 2074	03:10:32	137	Annular	−0.1242	0.9838	1:57	12.8°N 133.7°E	58	36	Annular: Maldives, Andaman and Nicobar Islands, Thailand, Cambodia, Vietnam, Philippines, Micronesia, Tuvalu; Partial: South Asia, Southeast Asia, East Asia, Northern Australia, Oceania		^{[a]}
January 16, 2075	18:36:04	142	Total	−0.2799	1.0311	2:42	37.2°S 94.1°W	110	68	Total: Chile, Argentina, Paraguay, Brazil; Partial: Oceania, Antarctica, South America		^{[a]}
July 13, 2075	06:05:44	147	Annular	0.6583	0.9467	4:45	63.1°N 95.2°E	262	163	Annular: Eastern Spain, France, Monaco, Italy, San Marino, Austria, Slovenia, Croatia, Bosnia and Herzegovina, Hungary, Slovakia, Czech Republic, Northwestern Romania, Poland, Ukraine, Belarus, Russia; Partial: Europe, North Africa, Greenland, Northern Canada, Alaska, Asia		^{[a]}
January 6, 2076	10:07:27	152	Total	−0.9373	1.0342	1:49	87.2°S 173.7°W	340	210	Total: Antarctica Partial: Southern South America, Antarctica, Southwestern Australia		^{[a]}
June 1, 2076	17:31:22	119	Partial	−1.3897	0.2897	—	64.4°S 51.2°W	—		Partial: Southern South America, Antarctic Peninsula		^{[a]}
July 1, 2076	06:50:43	157	Partial	1.4005	0.2746	—	67.0°N 98.1°W	—		Partial: Greenland, Northern Canada, Alaska, Russian Far East		^{[a]}
November 26, 2076	11:43:01	124	Partial	1.1401	0.7315	—	63.7°N 40.1°E	—		Partial: Africa, Europe, west Asia		^{[a]}
May 22, 2077	02:46:05	129	Total	−0.5725	1.029	2:54	13.1°S 148.3°E	119	74	Total: Australia, Papua New Guinea, Solomon Islands; Partial: Australia, Indonesia, Antarctica, Oceania		^{[a]}
November 15, 2077	17:07:56	134	Annular	0.4705	0.9371	7:54	7.8°N 70.8°W	262	163	Annular: Oregon, Washington, California, Idaho, Nevada, Utah, Colorado, Arizona, New Mexico, Texas, Yucatán Peninsula, Cuba, Colombia, Venezuela, Brazil, Guyana, Suriname, French Guiana; Partial: North America, Central America, the Caribbean, South America, West Africa		^{[a]}
May 11, 2078	17:56:55	139	Total	0.1838	1.0701	5:40	28.1°N 93.7°W	232	144	Total: Kiribati, Mexico, Texas, Louisiana, Mississippi, Alabama, Florida, Georgia, South Carolina, North Carolina, Virginia, Eastern Canary Islands; Partial: Oceania, North America, Central America, Caribbean, Northern South America, Western Europe, Northwest Africa		^{[a]}
November 4, 2078	16:55:44	144	Annular	−0.2285	0.9255	8:29	27.8°S 83.3°W	287	178	Annular: Chile, Argentina, Tristan da Cunha; Partial: Eastern Oceania, Mexico, Southwestern United States, Central America, South America, Antarctica		^{[a]}
May 1, 2079	10:50:13	149	Total	0.9081	1.0512	2:55	66.2°N 46.3°W	406	252	Total: Maryland, Delaware, Pennsylvania, New Jersey, New York, Connecticut, Massachusetts, Rhode Island, Vermont, New Hampshire, Maine, Eastern Canada, Greenland; Partial: Eastern North America, Eastern Caribbean, Northwest Africa, Europe, Russia		^{[a]}
October 24, 2079	18:11:21	154	Annular	−0.9243	0.9484	3:39	63.4°S 160.6°W	495	308	Annular: New Zealand, Antarctica; Partial: Oceania, Antarctica, Southern South America		^{[a]}
March 21, 2080	12:20:15	121	Partial	−1.0578	0.8734	—	60.9°S 85.9°E	—		Partial: Antarctica, Southern Africa		^{[a]}
September 13, 2080	16:38:09	126	Partial	1.0723	0.8743	—	61.1°N 25.8°E	—		Partial: Northern North America, Europe, West Africa, North Africa		^{[a]}
March 10, 2081	15:23:31	131	Annular	−0.3653	0.9304	7:36	22.4°S 36.7°W	277	172	Annular: Chile, Argentina, Liberia, Côte d'Ivoire, Ghana, Togo, Benin, Nigeria, Cameroon, Western Central African Republic; Partial: South America, Antarctica, Africa, Southern Europe		^{[a]}
September 3, 2081	09:07:31	136	Total	0.3378	1.072	5:33	24.6°N 53.6°E	247	153	Total: France, Germany, Switzerland, Liechtenstein, Austria, Italy, Slovenia, Croatia, Hungary, Bosnia and Herzegovina, Serbia, Romania, Bulgaria, Turkey, Syria, Iraq, Bahrain, Kuwait, Western Iran, Qatar, United Arab Emirates, Eastern Saudi Arabia, Oman, Maldives, Southern Indonesia; Partial: Greenland, Europe, North Africa, Northeast Africa, the Middle East, Central Asia, South Asia, Southeast Asia		^{[a]}
February 27, 2082	14:47:00	141	Annular	0.3361	0.9298	8:12	9.4°N 47.1°W	277	172	Annular: Peru, Brazil, Suriname, French Guiana, Portugal, Spain, France, Switzerland, Italy, Southern Germany, Liechtenstein, Austria, Slovenia, Croatia, Hungary; Partial: South America, Central America, Caribbean, Mexico, Southeastern United States, Eastern Canada, West Africa, North Africa, Greenland, Europe		^{[a]}
August 24, 2082	01:16:21	146	Total	−0.4004	1.0452	4:01	10.3°S 151.8°E	163	101	Total: Indonesia, Malaysia, Brunei, Papua New Guinea; Partial: Southeast Asia, Australia, Oceania, Antarctica		^{[a]}
February 16, 2083	18:06:36	151	Partial	1.017	0.9433	—	61.6°N 154.1°W	—		Partial: Hawaii, North America		^{[a]}
July 15, 2083	00:14:23	118	Partial	1.5465	0.0168	—	64.0°N 37.7°W	—		Partial: Greenland		^{[a]}
August 13, 2083	12:34:41	156	Partial	−1.2064	0.6146	—	62.1°S 67.5°W	—		Partial: Southern and Central South America, Antarctica		^{[a]}
January 7, 2084	17:30:23	123	Partial	−1.0715	0.8723	—	64.4°S 68.5°E	—		Partial: Antarctica, Extreme Southern South America		^{[a]}
July 3, 2084	01:50:26	128	Annular	0.8208	0.9421	4:25	75.0°N 169.1°W	377	234	Annular: Russia, Alaska, Western Canada, Washington, Oregon, Idaho, California, Nevada, Utah, Wyoming; Partial: Scandinavia, East Asia, Russia, Hawaii, Western North America		^{[a]}
December 27, 2084	09:13:48	133	Total	−0.4094	1.0396	3:04	47.3°S 47.7°E	146	91	Total: Crozet Islands; Partial: Southern Africa, Antarctica, Australia		^{[a]}
June 22, 2085	03:21:16	138	Annular	0.0452	0.9704	3:29	26.2°N 131.3°E	106	66	Annular: India, Myanmar, China, Ryukyu Islands, Marshall Islands, Kiribati; Partial: South Asia, Southeast Asia, East Asia, Oceania, Hawaii		^{[a]}
December 16, 2085	22:37:48	143	Annular	0.2786	0.9971	0:19	7.3°S 160.8°W	10	6.2	Annular: Micronesia, Southwestern Mexico; Partial: Northern Australia, Oceania, Hawaii, Western North America		^{[a]}
June 11, 2086	11:07:14	148	Total	−0.7215	1.0174	1:48	23.2°S 12.5°E	86	53	Total: Namibia, Botswana, South Africa; Partial: Eastern Brazil, Southern Africa, Central Africa		^{[a]}
December 6, 2086	05:38:55	153	Partial	1.0194	0.9271	—	67.4°N 96.2°E	—		Partial: Asia		^{[a]}
May 2, 2087	18:04:42	120	Partial	1.1139	0.8011	—	70.3°N 127.6°E	—		Partial: Eastern Russia, Northern North America, Northern Europe		^{[a]}
June 1, 2087	01:27:14	158	Partial	−1.4186	0.2146	—	67.8°S 165.4°E	—		Partial: New Zealand		^{[a]}
October 26, 2087	11:46:57	125	Partial	−1.2882	0.4696	—	71.0°S 130.5°W	—		Partial: Southern South America, Antarctica		^{[a]}
April 21, 2088	10:31:49	130	Total	0.4135	1.0474	3:58	36.0°N 15.1°E	173	107	Total: Cape Verde, Mauritania, Western Sahara, Northern Mali, Algeria, Tunisia, Malta, Southern Italy, Greece, Turkey, Georgia, Southern Russia, Kazakhstan, Uzbekistan, Kyrgyzstan, Western China; Partial: Eastern Canada, Greenland, Europe, West Africa, North Africa, Middle East, Central Asia, South Asia, Southeast Asia		^{[a]}
October 14, 2088	14:48:05	135	Annular	−0.5349	0.9727	2:38	39.7°S 56.0°W	115	71	Annular: Chile, Argentina; Partial: South America, Antarctica, Southern Africa		^{[a]}
April 10, 2089	22:44:42	140	Annular	−0.3319	0.9919	0:53	10.2°S 154.8°W	30	19	Annular: Southeastern Australia, Tonga, Niue; Partial: Australia, Oceania, Antarctica, Mexico, Central America		^{[a]}
October 4, 2089	01:15:23	145	Total	0.2167	1.0333	3:14	7.4°N 162.8°E	115	71	Total: China, Ryukyu Islands, Northern Mariana Islands, Kiribati; Partial: East Asia, Southeast Asia, Oceania, Hawaii		^{[a]}
March 31, 2090	03:38:08	150	Partial	−1.1028	0.7843	—	72.1°S 156.3°W	—		Partial: Antarctica, Southeastern Australia, Oceania		^{[a]}
September 23, 2090	16:56:36	155	Total	0.9157	1.0562	3:36	60.7°N 40.5°W	463	288	Total: Northern Canada, Greenland, Southern Ireland, Southern United Kingdom, France, Belgium; Partial: North America, Western Europe, West Africa		^{[a]}
February 18, 2091	09:54:40	122	Partial	1.1779	0.6558	—	71.2°N 17.8°W	—		Partial: Europe, North Africa, Central Asia		^{[a]}
August 15, 2091	00:34:43	127	Total	−0.949	1.0216	1:38	55.6°S 150.5°E	236	147	Total: None; Partial: Australia, Oceania, Antarctica		^{[a]}
February 7, 2092	15:10:20	132	Annular	0.4322	0.984	1:48	9.9°N 48.7°W	62	39	Annular: Panama, Colombia, Venezuela, Guyana, Canary Islands, Morocco, Algeria, Tunisia; Partial: North America, Central America, Caribbean, Northern South America, West Africa, Northwest Africa, Western Europe		^{[a]}
August 3, 2092	09:59:33	137	Annular	−0.2044	0.9794	2:31	5.6°N 30.3°E	75	47	Annular: Liberia, Côte d'Ivoire, Ghana, Togo, Benin, Nigeria, Cameroon, Chad, Central African Republic, South Sudan, Uganda, Kenya, Somalia, Seychelles; Partial: Eastern Brazil, Africa, Southern Europe, Middle East, South Asia		^{[a]}
January 27, 2093	03:22:16	142	Total	−0.2737	1.034	2:58	34.1°S 136.4°E	119	74	Total: Australia; Partial: Indies, Australia, Antarctica, New Zealand		^{[a]}
July 23, 2093	12:32:04	147	Annular	0.5717	0.9463	5:11	54.6°N 1.3°E	241	150	Annular: Illinois, Indiana, Ohio, Michigan, Pennsylvania, New York, Vermont, New Hampshire, Maine, Southeastern Canada, Ireland, United Kingdom, Netherlands, Germany, Czech Republic, Poland, Slovakia, Hungary, Ukraine, Romania, Moldova, Turkey, Iraq, Iran, Pakistan, Western India; Partial: Eastern North America, Caribbean, Europe, North Africa, Central Asia, North Asia, South Asia		^{[a]}
January 16, 2094	18:59:03	152	Total	−0.9333	1.0342	1:51	84.8°S 10.6°W	329	204	Total: Antarctica; Partial: South America, Antarctica, New Zealand		^{[a]}
June 13, 2094	00:22:11	119	Partial	−1.4613	0.1618	—	65.3°S 163.6°W	—		Partial: None		^{[a]}
July 12, 2094	13:24:35	157	Partial	1.3150	0.4224	—	68.0°N 152.8°E	—		Partial: Northern North America, Scandinavia, Russia		^{[a]}
December 7, 2094	20:05:56	124	Partial	1.1547	0.7046	—	64.7°N 95.0°W	—		Partial: North America		^{[a]}
June 2, 2095	10:07:40	129	Total	−0.6396	1.0332	3:18	16.7°S 37.2°E	145	90	Total: South Africa, Namibia, Botswana, Zimbabwe, Mozambique, Southern Malawi, Madagascar; Partial: Southern Africa, Central Africa, East Africa, Southern Middle East, Southern India		^{[a]}
November 27, 2095	01:02:57	134	Annular	0.4903	0.933	8:47	7.2°N 169.8°E	285	177	Annular: Northeastern China, North Korea, South Korea, Japan, Marshall Islands, Kiribati; Partial: East Asia, Southeast Asia, Oceania, Hawaii, Southwestern Alaska		^{[a]}
May 22, 2096	01:37:14	139	Total	0.1196	1.0737	6:07	27.3°N 153.4°E	241	150	Total: Indonesia, Philippines; Partial: Southeast Asia, East Asia, Northern Australia, Hawaii, Northwestern North America		^{[a]}
November 15, 2096	00:36:15	144	Annular	−0.20	0.9237	8:53	29.7°S 163.3°E	294	183	Annular: Malaysia, Brunei, Indonesia, Papua New Guinea, Northeastern Australia, New Zealand; Partial: Southeast Asia, Australia, Oceania, Antarctica		^{[a]}
May 11, 2097	18:34:31	149	Total	0.8516	1.0538	3:10	67.4°N 149.5°W	339	211	Total: Alaska, Svalbard, Eastern Norway, Northwestern Russia; Partial: Hawaii, Northern Russia, Canada, Northwestern United States, Greenland, Northern Europe		^{[a]}
November 4, 2097	02:01:25	154	Annular	−0.8926	0.9494	3:36	65.8°S 86.8°E	411	255	Annular: Antarctica; Partial: Southwestern Australia, Antarctica		^{[a]}
April 1, 2098	20:02:31	121	Partial	−1.1005	0.7984	—	61.0°S 38.1°W	—		Partial: Antarctica, Southern and Central South America		^{[a]}
September 25, 2098	00:31:16	126	Partial	1.14	0.7871	—	61.1°N 101.0°W	—		Partial: Russian Far East, Hawaii, Western North America		^{[a]}
October 24, 2098	10:36:11	164	Partial	−1.5407	0.0056	—	61.8°S 95.5°W	—		Partial: None		^{[a]}
March 21, 2099	22:54:32	131	Annular	−0.4016	0.93	7:32	20.0°S 149.0°W	275	171	Annular: Auckland Islands, Chatham Island, French Polynesia; Partial: Eastern Australia, Oceania, Antarctica, Hawaii, Mexico, Central America, Southwestern United States		^{[a]}
September 14, 2099	16:57:53	136	Total	0.3942	1.0684	5:18	23.4°N 62.8°W	241	150	Total: Southwestern Canada, Montana, North Dakota, South Dakota, Minnesota, Iowa, (Note: It passes through around 15 miles in its northeast corner.) Wisconsin, Illinois, Indiana, Michigan, Ohio, Pennsylvania, West Virginia, Maryland, Virginia, North Carolina; Partial: North America, Central America, Caribbean, Northern South America, Iberian Peninsula, West Africa		^{[a]}
March 10, 2100	22:28:11	141	Annular	0.3077	0.9338	7:29	12.0°N 162.4°W	257	160	Annular: Northeastern Australia, Papua New Guinea, Solomon Islands, Tuvalu, Hawaii, California, Oregon, Nevada, Idaho, Montana, Wyoming, North Dakota, South Dakota, Minnesota; Partial: Australia, Oceania, North America		^{[a]}
September 4, 2100	08:49:20	146	Total	−0.3384	1.0402	3:32	10.5°S 39.0°E	142	88	Total: Sierra Leone, Guinea, Côte d'Ivoire, Ghana, Togo, Benin, Nigeria, Cameroon, Central African Republic, Democratic Republic of the Congo, Rwanda, Uganda, Burundi, Tanzania, Mozambique, Madagascar; Partial: Africa, Southern Europe, Middle East, Antarctica		^{[a]}

== See also ==
- List of solar eclipses in the 18th century
- List of solar eclipses in the 19th century
- List of solar eclipses in the 20th century
- List of lunar eclipses in the 21st century
