= Lunar Saros 151 =

Lunar Saros series 151

Saros cycle series 151 for lunar eclipses occurs at the moon's descending node, repeats every 18 years 11 and 1/3 days. It contains 71 events.

This lunar saros is linked to Solar Saros 158.

Cat.	Saros	Mem	Date	Time UT (hr:mn)	Type	Gamma	Magnitude	Duration (min)			Contacts UT (hr:mn)						Chart
Cat.	Saros	Mem	Date	Greatest	Type	Gamma	Magnitude	Pen.	Par.	Tot.	P1	P4	U1	U2	U3	U4	Chart
09868	151	1	2096 Jun 06	2:43:41	Penumbral	-1.5723	-1.0584	21.2			2:33:05	2:54:17					
09910	151	2	2114 Jun 18	9:17:07	Penumbral	-1.4944	-0.9157	117.4			8:18:25	10:15:49					
09952	151	3	2132 Jun 28	15:45:35	Penumbral	-1.4127	-0.7663	164.7			14:23:14	17:07:56					
09996	151	4	2150 Jul 09	22:13:22	Penumbral	-1.3300	-0.6151	199.9			20:33:25	23:53:19					
10039	151	5	2168 Jul 20	4:38:50	Penumbral	-1.2454	-0.4607	228.9			2:44:23	6:33:17					
10082	151	6	2186 Jul 31	11:07:14	Penumbral	-1.1629	-0.3102	252.6			9:00:56	13:13:32					
10125	151	7	2204 Aug 11	17:37:23	Penumbral	-1.0819	-0.1627	272.6			15:21:05	19:53:41					
10169	151	8	2222 Aug 23	0:12:08	Penumbral	-1.0042	-0.0214	289.4			21:47:26	2:36:50					
10214	151	9	2240 Sep 02	6:52:16	Partial	-0.9304	0.1126	303.5	81.7		4:20:31	9:24:01	6:11:25			7:33:07	
10259	151	10	2258 Sep 13	13:39:53	Partial	-0.8623	0.2362	315.1	116.3		11:02:20	16:17:26	12:41:44			14:38:02	
10305	151	11	2276 Sep 23	20:35:24	Partial	-0.8004	0.3482	324.7	138.9		17:53:03	23:17:45	19:25:57			21:44:51	
10352	151	12	2294 Oct 05	3:38:22	Partial	-0.7442	0.4498	332.5	155.4		0:52:07	6:24:37	2:20:40			4:56:04	
10398	151	13	2312 Oct 16	10:51:23	Partial	-0.6960	0.5368	338.6	167.4		8:02:05	13:40:41	9:27:41			12:15:05	
10444	151	14	2330 Oct 27	18:12:55	Partial	-0.6542	0.6121	343.5	176.4		15:21:10	21:04:40	16:44:43			19:41:07	
10490	151	15	2348 Nov 07	1:44:25	Partial	-0.6202	0.6733	347.2	183.0		22:50:49	4:38:01	0:12:55			3:15:55	
10535	151	16	2366 Nov 18	9:23:06	Partial	-0.5917	0.7245	350.0	188.0		6:28:06	12:18:06	7:49:06			10:57:06	
10580	151	17	2384 Nov 28	17:11:03	Partial	-0.5705	0.7626	351.9	191.5		14:15:06	20:07:00	15:35:18			18:46:48	
10625	151	18	2402 Dec 10	1:04:27	Partial	-0.5534	0.7935	353.2	194.1		22:07:51	4:01:03	23:27:24			2:41:30	
10670	151	19	2420 Dec 20	9:03:39	Partial	-0.5406	0.8168	353.9	195.9		6:06:42	12:00:36	7:25:42			10:41:36	
10714	151	20	2438 Dec 31	17:06:05	Partial	-0.5300	0.8365	354.4	197.3		14:08:53	20:03:17	15:27:26			18:44:44	
10758	151	21	2457 Jan 11	1:11:47	Partial	-0.5215	0.8527	354.5	198.3		22:14:32	4:09:02	23:32:38			2:50:56	
10800	151	22	2475 Jan 22	9:16:58	Partial	-0.5121	0.8708	354.5	199.5		6:19:43	12:14:13	7:37:13			10:56:43	
10841	151	23	2493 Feb 01	17:21:21	Partial	-0.5016	0.8915	354.5	200.8		14:24:06	20:18:36	15:40:57			19:01:45	
10882	151	24	2511 Feb 14	1:22:52	Partial	-0.4880	0.9181	354.5	202.5		22:25:37	4:20:07	23:41:37			3:04:07	
10922	151	25	2529 Feb 24	9:21:26	Partial	-0.4712	0.9508	354.6	204.5		6:24:08	12:18:44	7:39:11			11:03:41	
10963	151	26	2547 Mar 07	17:12:49	Partial	-0.4480	0.9958	355.1	207.1		14:15:16	20:10:22	15:29:16			18:56:22	
11005	151	27	2565 Mar 18	0:59:22	Total	-0.4202	1.0492	355.6	210.0	35.6	22:01:34	3:57:10	23:14:22	0:41:34	1:17:10	2:44:22	
11046	151	28	2583 Mar 29	8:37:39	Total	-0.3849	1.1167	356.3	213.4	53.6	5:39:30	11:35:48	6:50:57	8:10:51	9:04:27	10:24:21	
11086	151	29	2601 Apr 09	16:10:39	Total	-0.3445	1.1937	357.1	216.8	67.3	13:12:06	19:09:12	14:22:15	15:37:00	16:44:18	17:59:03	
11126	151	30	2619 Apr 20	23:33:42	Total	-0.2952	1.2870	357.8	220.4	79.1	20:34:48	2:32:36	21:43:30	22:54:09	0:13:15	1:23:54	
11167	151	31	2637 May 1	6:52:10	Total	-0.2413	1.3888	358.4	223.5	88.5	3:52:58	9:51:22	5:00:25	6:07:55	7:36:25	8:43:55	
11208	151	32	2655 May 12	14:01:47	Total	-0.1797	1.5046	358.6	226.1	96.0	11:02:29	17:01:05	12:08:44	13:13:47	14:49:47	15:54:50	
11250	151	33	2673 May 22	21:07:24	Total	-0.1140	1.6281	358.4	227.8	101.2	18:08:12	0:06:36	19:13:30	20:16:48	21:58:00	23:01:18	
11293	151	34	2691 Jun 03	4:06:13	Total	-0.0418	1.7632	357.5	228.6	104.0	1:07:28	7:04:58	2:11:55	3:14:13	4:58:13	6:00:31	
11336	151	35	2709 Jun 14	11:03:25	Total	0.0326	1.7826	355.9	228.1	104.1	8:05:28	14:01:22	9:09:22	10:11:22	11:55:28	12:57:28	
11378	151	36	2727 Jun 25	17:57:08	Total	0.1104	1.6419	353.5	226.3	101.2	15:00:23	20:53:53	16:03:59	17:06:32	18:47:44	19:50:17	
11420	151	37	2745 Jul 06	0:50:21	Total	0.1897	1.4986	350.1	223.0	94.9	21:55:18	3:45:24	22:58:51	0:02:54	1:37:48	2:41:51	
11464	151	38	2763 Jul 17	7:43:39	Total	0.2695	1.3540	345.9	218.1	84.5	4:50:42	10:36:36	5:54:36	7:01:24	8:25:54	9:32:42	
11508	151	39	2781 Jul 27	14:38:59	Total	0.3484	1.2108	340.8	211.8	68.4	11:48:35	17:29:23	12:53:05	14:04:47	15:13:11	16:24:53	
11554	151	40	2799 Aug 07	21:37:38	Total	0.4256	1.0705	335.0	204.1	41.2	18:50:08	0:25:08	19:55:35	21:17:02	21:58:14	23:19:41	
11601	151	41	2817 Aug 18	4:40:17	Partial	0.5002	0.9347	328.5	194.9		1:56:02	7:24:32	3:02:50			6:17:44	
11649	151	42	2835 Aug 29	11:49:21	Partial	0.5704	0.8068	321.5	184.6		9:08:36	14:30:06	10:17:03			13:21:39	
11695	151	43	2853 Sep 08	19:05:00	Partial	0.6356	0.6877	314.2	173.3		16:27:54	21:42:06	17:38:21			20:31:39	
11741	151	44	2871 Sep 20	2:28:09	Partial	0.6956	0.5781	306.9	161.2		23:54:42	5:01:36	1:07:33			3:48:45	
11787	151	45	2889 Sep 30	9:59:39	Partial	0.7495	0.4796	299.7	148.7		7:29:48	12:29:30	8:45:18			11:14:00	
11832	151	46	2907 Oct 12	17:40:09	Partial	0.7968	0.3929	292.8	135.9		15:13:45	20:06:33	16:32:12			18:48:06	
11877	151	47	2925 Oct 23	1:29:54	Partial	0.8370	0.3194	286.4	123.5		23:06:42	3:53:06	0:28:09			2:31:39	
11922	151	48	2943 Nov 03	9:27:52	Partial	0.8712	0.2566	280.7	111.4		7:07:31	11:48:13	8:32:10			10:23:34	
11968	151	49	2961 Nov 13	17:35:24	Partial	0.8982	0.2071	275.8	100.5		15:17:30	19:53:18	16:45:09			18:25:39	
12013	151	50	2979 Nov 25	1:51:15	Partial	0.9195	0.1682	271.7	90.8		23:35:24	4:07:06	1:05:51			2:36:39	
12057	151	51	2997 Dec 05	10:15:08	Partial	0.9348	0.1403	268.5	83.0		8:00:53	12:29:23	9:33:38			10:56:38	

== See also ==
- List of lunar eclipses
  - List of Saros series for lunar eclipses
