= Solar Saros 158 =

Saros cycle series 158 for solar eclipses

Saros cycle series 158 for solar eclipses will occur at the Moon's descending node, repeating every 18 years, 11 days, containing 70 eclipses, 53 of which will be umbral (35 total, 2 hybrid, 16 annular). The first eclipse in the series will be on 20 May 2069 and the last will be on 16 June 3313.

The longest totality will be 4 minutes 43 seconds on 28 August 2231 and the longest annular will be 6 minutes 7 seconds on 25 January 3079.

This solar saros is linked to Lunar Saros 151.

== Umbral eclipses ==
Umbral eclipses (annular, total and hybrid) can be further classified as either: 1) Central (two limits), 2) Central (one limit) or 3) Non-Central (one limit). The statistical distribution of these classes in Saros series 158 appears in the following table.

Classification	Number	Percent
All Umbral eclipses	53	100.00%
Central (two limits)	49	92.45%
Central (one limit)	2	3.77%
Non-central (one limit)	2	3.77%

== All eclipses ==
Saros	Member	Date	Time (Greatest) UTC	Type	Location Lat, Long	Gamma	Mag.	Width (km)	Duration (min:sec)	Ref
158	1	May 20, 2069	17:53:18	Partial	68.8S 69.9W	-1.4852	0.0879			
158	2	June 1, 2087	1:27:14	Partial	67.8S 165.4E	-1.4186	0.2146			
158	3	June 12, 2105	8:58:11	Partial	66.8S 41.9E	-1.3489	0.3483			
158	4	June 23, 2123	16:26:12	Partial	65.8S 80.3W	-1.2763	0.4882			
158	5	July 3, 2141	23:53:38	Partial	64.9S 158E	-1.2029	0.6305			
158	6	July 15, 2159	7:20:50	Partial	64S 36.7E	-1.1288	0.7743			
158	7	July 25, 2177	14:50:33	Partial	63.2S 85W	-1.0564	0.9149			
158	8	August 5, 2195	22:21:03	Total	56.1S 166.4E	-0.9843	1.0618	-	4m 3s	
158	9	August 17, 2213	5:56:32	Total	46S 60.3E	-0.9161	1.0653	525	4m 35s	
158	10	August 28, 2231	13:35:31	Total	41.4S 52.2W	-0.8506	1.0661	402	4m 43s	
158	11	September 7, 2249	21:21:29	Total	39.4S 167.4W	-0.7907	1.0656	343	4m 42s	
158	12	September 19, 2267	5:12:14	Total	38.8S 75.9E	-0.7348	1.0642	304	4m 34s	
158	13	September 29, 2285	13:11:38	Total	39.6S 42.9W	-0.6859	1.0621	275	4m 24s	
158	14	October 11, 2303	21:17:25	Total	41.1S 163.2W	-0.6424	1.0596	252	4m 12s	
158	15	October 22, 2321	5:31:18	Total	43.3S 74.8E	-0.6059	1.0567	233	4m 0s	
158	16	November 2, 2339	13:51:50	Total	45.8S 48.3W	-0.5751	1.0536	215	3m 47s	
158	17	November 12, 2357	22:20:23	Total	48.4S 172.7W	-0.5514	1.0505	200	3m 35s	
158	18	November 24, 2375	6:54:54	Total	50.7S 62.3E	-0.5328	1.0474	186	3m 23s	
158	19	December 4, 2393	15:34:35	Total	52.6S 63W	-0.5188	1.0445	174	3m 13s	
158	20	December 16, 2411	0:19:07	Total	53.6S 171.2E	-0.5093	1.0419	163	3m 4s	
158	21	December 26, 2429	9:07:20	Total	53.7S 44.9E	-0.5035	1.0397	155	2m 57s	
158	22	January 6, 2448	17:57:07	Total	52.6S 82W	-0.4991	1.038	147	2m 51s	
158	23	January 17, 2466	2:47:01	Total	50.4S 150.3E	-0.4953	1.0366	142	2m 48s	
158	24	January 28, 2484	11:35:53	Total	47.2S 21.5E	-0.491	1.0358	138	2m 48s	
158	25	February 8, 2502	20:22:29	Total	43.3S 107.9W	-0.4851	1.0354	136	2m 49s	
158	26	February 20, 2520	5:04:06	Total	38.7S 122.7E	-0.4758	1.0353	135	2m 54s	
158	27	March 2, 2538	13:41:10	Total	33.6S 6.5W	-0.4629	1.0357	135	3m 1s	
158	28	March 12, 2556	22:11:21	Total	28.1S 134.7W	-0.4447	1.0362	135	3m 10s	
158	29	March 24, 2574	6:34:21	Total	22.3S 98.3E	-0.4208	1.0371	137	3m 21s	
158	30	April 3, 2592	14:48:32	Total	16.3S 26.7W	-0.3902	1.0378	137	3m 32s	
158	31	April 15, 2610	22:55:08	Total	10.2S 150W	-0.3537	1.0387	138	3m 44s	
158	32	April 26, 2628	6:52:57	Total	4S 89.1E	-0.3105	1.0392	138	3m 53s	
158	33	May 7, 2646	14:41:46	Total	2.1N 29.4W	-0.2602	1.0396	137	4m 0s	
158	34	May 17, 2664	22:22:49	Total	7.9N 145.4W	-0.204	1.0395	135	4m 2s	
158	35	May 29, 2682	5:56:13	Total	13.5N 100.9E	-0.1419	1.039	132	3m 59s	
158	36	June 9, 2700	13:23:20	Total	18.7N 10.5W	-0.0753	1.0379	128	3m 49s	
158	37	June 20, 2718	20:43:15	Total	23.3N 119.4W	-0.0034	1.0362	122	3m 34s	
158	38	July 1, 2736	3:59:45	Total	27.1N 133.3E	0.0707	1.0339	114	3m 15s	
158	39	July 12, 2754	11:11:56	Total	30.2N 27.8E	0.1479	1.0308	105	2m 52s	
158	40	July 22, 2772	18:22:15	Total	32.4N 76.7W	0.2259	1.0272	95	2m 27s	
158	41	August 3, 2790	1:30:57	Total	33.9N 179.4E	0.3044	1.0228	81	2m 0s	
158	42	August 13, 2808	8:40:55	Total	34.5N 75.3E	0.381	1.0178	66	1m 32s	
158	43	August 24, 2826	15:52:15	Hybrid	34.6N 29.4W	0.4557	1.0123	47	1m 3s	
158	44	September 3, 2844	23:05:38	Hybrid	34.5N 135W	0.5278	1.0063	25	0m 32s	
158	45	September 15, 2862	6:23:08	Annular	34.2N 117.9E	0.5956	0.9999	0	0m 1s	
158	46	September 25, 2880	13:45:31	Annular	34N 9.1E	0.6583	0.9932	31	0m 36s	
158	47	October 6, 2898	21:13:41	Annular	34.1N 101.8W	0.7154	0.9864	67	1m 13s	
158	48	October 18, 2916	4:47:37	Annular	34.6N 145.3E	0.7665	0.9794	111	1m 54s	
158	49	October 29, 2934	12:28:43	Annular	35.6N 29.9E	0.8111	0.9727	163	2m 35s	
158	50	November 8, 2952	20:16:40	Annular	37.2N 87.8W	0.8489	0.966	227	3m 18s	
158	51	November 20, 2970	4:10:31	Annular	39.2N 152.3E	0.881	0.9597	305	3m 59s	
158	52	November 30, 2988	12:11:10	Annular	41.7N 29.8E	0.9066	0.9538	398	4m 38s	
158	53	December 12, 3006	20:17:01	Annular	44.4N 94.7W	0.9271	0.9484	508	5m 11s	
158	54	December 23, 3024	4:28:14	Annular	47.4N 138.6E	0.9426	0.9437	632	5m 37s	
158	55	January 3, 3043	12:41:05	Annular	50.8N 10.7E	0.9561	0.9395	784	5m 55s	
158	56	January 13, 3061	20:57:30	Annular	54.1N 119.0W	0.9658	0.9359	951	6m 05s	
158	57	January 25, 3079	5:13:22	Annular	58.0N 110.2E	0.9751	0.9330	1184	6m 07s	
158	58	February 4, 3097	13:28:42	Annular	62.5N 22.7W	0.9846	0.9305	-	6m 00s	
158	59	February 16, 3115	21:39:29	Annular	71.2N 169.1W	0.9970	0.9634			
158	60	February 27, 3133	5:47:09	Annular	71.9N 56.0E	1.0115	0.9386			
158	61	March 10, 3151	13:47:51	Partial	72.3N 77.7W	1.0308	0.9057			
158	62	March 20, 3169	21:41:29	Partial	72.4N 150.1E	1.0551	0.8645			
158	63	April 1, 3187	5:26:11	Partial	72.3N 20.3E	1.0861	0.8122			
158	64	April 11, 3205	13:02:42	Partial	71.9N 107.3W	1.1231	0.7496			
158	65	April 22, 3223	20:28:46	Partial	71.2N 128.4E	1.1679	0.6739			
158	66	May 3, 3241	3:45:42	Partial	70.4N 6.9E	1.2193	0.5866			
158	67	May 14, 3259	10:52:59	Partial	69.5N 111.5W	1.2777	0.4872			
158	68	May 24, 3277	17:52:27	Partial	68.5N 132.7E	1.3417	0.3780			
158	69	June 5, 3295	0:42:06	Partial	67.5N 19.9E	1.4130	0.2563			
158	70	June 16, 3313	7:26:19	Partial	66.5N 90.9W	1.4877	0.1283			
