= Solar eclipse of May 20, 2069 =

Future partial solar eclipse

- Partial eclipse
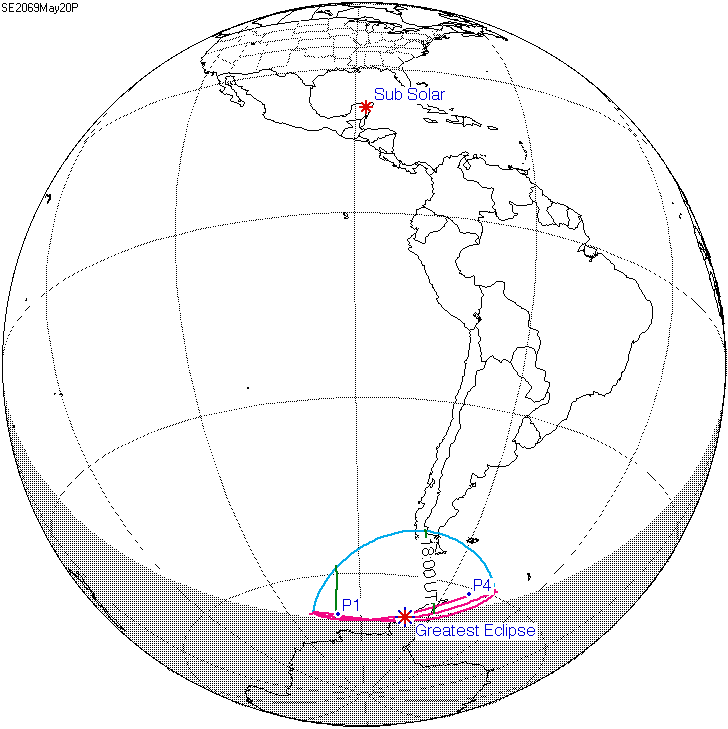
- Map
- Gamma: −1.4852
- Magnitude: 0.0879

Maximum eclipse
- Coordinates: 68.8°S 69.9°W

Times (UTC)
- Greatest eclipse: 17:53:18

References
- Saros: 158 (1 of 70)
- Catalog # (SE5000): 9662

A partial solar eclipse will occur at the Moon's descending node of orbit on Monday, May 20, 2069, with a magnitude of 0.0879. A solar eclipse occurs when the Moon passes between Earth and the Sun, thereby totally or partly obscuring the image of the Sun for a viewer on Earth. A partial solar eclipse occurs in the polar regions of the Earth when the center of the Moon's shadow misses the Earth.

The partial solar eclipse will be visible for parts of the Antarctic Peninsula and extreme southern Chile and Argentina. This event will mark the beginning of Solar Saros 158.

== Eclipse details ==
Shown below are two tables displaying details about this particular solar eclipse. The first table outlines times at which the Moon's penumbra or umbra attains the specific parameter, and the second table describes various other parameters pertaining to this eclipse.

May 20, 2069 Solar Eclipse Times
Event	Time (UTC)
First Penumbral External Contact	2069 May 20 at 17:14:39.1 UTC
Equatorial Conjunction	2069 May 20 at 17:35:14.2 UTC
Greatest Eclipse	2069 May 20 at 17:53:17.8 UTC
Ecliptic Conjunction	2069 May 20 at 18:07:59.8 UTC
Last Penumbral External Contact	2069 May 20 at 18:32:06.9 UTC

May 20, 2069 Solar Eclipse Parameters
Parameter	Value
Eclipse Magnitude	0.08791
Eclipse Obscuration	0.03123
Gamma	−1.48519
Sun Right Ascension	03h52m35.6s
Sun Declination	+20°12'26.5"
Sun Semi-Diameter	15'48.3"
Sun Equatorial Horizontal Parallax	08.7"
Moon Right Ascension	03h53m19.8s
Moon Declination	+18°43'03.9"
Moon Semi-Diameter	16'32.8"
Moon Equatorial Horizontal Parallax	1°00'43.6"
ΔT	97.1 s

== Eclipse season ==
This eclipse is part of an eclipse season, a period, roughly every six months, when eclipses occur. Only two (or occasionally three) eclipse seasons occur each year, and each season lasts about 35 days and repeats just short of six months (173 days) later; thus two full eclipse seasons always occur each year. Either two or three eclipses happen each eclipse season. In the sequence below, each eclipse is separated by a fortnight. The first and last eclipse in this sequence is separated by one synodic month.

Eclipse season of April–May 2069
April 21 Descending node (new moon)	May 6 Ascending node (full moon)	May 20 Descending node (new moon)
Partial solar eclipse Solar Saros 120	Total lunar eclipse Lunar Saros 132	Partial solar eclipse Solar Saros 158

== Related eclipses ==
=== Eclipses in 2069 ===
- A partial solar eclipse on April 21.
- A total lunar eclipse on May 6.
- A partial solar eclipse on May 20.
- A partial solar eclipse on October 15.
- A total lunar eclipse on October 30.

=== Metonic ===
- Preceded by: Solar eclipse of August 2, 2065

=== Tzolkinex ===
- Followed by: Solar eclipse of July 1, 2076

=== Tritos ===
- Preceded by: Solar eclipse of June 21, 2058

=== Solar Saros 158 ===
- Followed by: Solar eclipse of June 1, 2087

=== Triad ===
- Preceded by: Solar eclipse of July 20, 1982

=== Solar eclipses of 2065–2069 ===
This eclipse is a member of a semester series. An eclipse in a semester series of solar eclipses repeats approximately every 177 days and 4 hours (a semester) at alternating nodes of the Moon's orbit.

The partial solar eclipses on February 5, 2065 and August 2, 2065 occur in the previous lunar year eclipse set, and the partial solar eclipses on April 21, 2069 and October 15, 2069 occur in the next lunar year eclipse set.

Solar eclipse series sets from 2065 to 2069
Descending node			Ascending node		
Saros	Map	Gamma	Saros	Map	Gamma
118	July 3, 2065 Partial	1.4619	123	December 27, 2065 Partial	−1.0688
128	June 22, 2066 Annular	0.733	133	December 17, 2066 Total	−0.4043
138	June 11, 2067 Annular	−0.0387	143	December 6, 2067 Hybrid	0.2845
148	May 31, 2068 Total	−0.797	153	November 24, 2068 Partial	1.0299
158	May 20, 2069 Partial	−1.4852			

=== Saros 158 ===
This eclipse is a part of Saros series 158, repeating every 18 years, 11 days, and containing 70 events. The series will start with a partial solar eclipse on May 20, 2069. It contains total eclipses from August 5, 2195 through August 13, 2808; hybrid eclipses on August 24, 2826 and September 3, 2844; and annular eclipses from September 15, 2862 through February 27, 3133. The series ends at member 70 as a partial eclipse on June 16, 3313. Its eclipses are tabulated in three columns; every third eclipse in the same column is one exeligmos apart, so they all cast shadows over approximately the same parts of the Earth.

The longest duration of totality will be produced by member 10 at 4 minutes, 43 seconds on August 28, 2231, and the longest duration of annularity will be produced by member 57 at 6 minutes, 7 seconds on January 25, 3079. All eclipses in this series occur at the Moon’s descending node of orbit.

Series members 1–8 occur between 2069 and 2200:
1	2	3
May 20, 2069	June 1, 2087	June 12, 2105
4	5	6
June 23, 2123	July 3, 2141	July 15, 2159
7	8	
July 25, 2177	August 5, 2195	

=== Metonic series ===
The metonic series repeats eclipses every 19 years (6939.69 days), lasting about 5 cycles. Eclipses occur in nearly the same calendar date. In addition, the octon subseries repeats 1/5 of that or every 3.8 years (1387.94 days). All eclipses in this table occur at the Moon's descending node.

21 eclipse events between May 21, 1993 and May 20, 2069
May 20–21	March 9	December 25–26	October 13–14	August 1–2
118	120	122	124	126
May 21, 1993	March 9, 1997	December 25, 2000	October 14, 2004	August 1, 2008
128	130	132	134	136
May 20, 2012	March 9, 2016	December 26, 2019	October 14, 2023	August 2, 2027
138	140	142	144	146
May 21, 2031	March 9, 2035	December 26, 2038	October 14, 2042	August 2, 2046
148	150	152	154	156
May 20, 2050	March 9, 2054	December 26, 2057	October 13, 2061	August 2, 2065
158
May 20, 2069

=== Tritos series ===
This eclipse is a part of a tritos cycle, repeating at alternating nodes every 135 synodic months (≈ 3986.63 days, or 11 years minus 1 month). Their appearance and longitude are irregular due to a lack of synchronization with the anomalistic month (period of perigee), but groupings of 3 tritos cycles (≈ 33 years minus 3 months) come close (≈ 434.044 anomalistic months), so eclipses are similar in these groupings.

The partial solar eclipses on November 16, 2134 (part of Saros 164) and October 16, 2145 (part of Saros 165) are also a part of this series but are not included in the table below.

Series members between 1801 and 2069
June 6, 1807 (Saros 134)	May 5, 1818 (Saros 135)	April 3, 1829 (Saros 136)	March 4, 1840 (Saros 137)	February 1, 1851 (Saros 138)
December 31, 1861 (Saros 139)	November 30, 1872 (Saros 140)	October 30, 1883 (Saros 141)	September 29, 1894 (Saros 142)	August 30, 1905 (Saros 143)
July 30, 1916 (Saros 144)	June 29, 1927 (Saros 145)	May 29, 1938 (Saros 146)	April 28, 1949 (Saros 147)	March 27, 1960 (Saros 148)
February 25, 1971 (Saros 149)	January 25, 1982 (Saros 150)	December 24, 1992 (Saros 151)	November 23, 2003 (Saros 152)	October 23, 2014 (Saros 153)
September 21, 2025 (Saros 154)	August 21, 2036 (Saros 155)	July 22, 2047 (Saros 156)	June 21, 2058 (Saros 157)	May 20, 2069 (Saros 158)

=== Inex series ===
This eclipse is a part of the long period inex cycle, repeating at alternating nodes, every 358 synodic months (≈ 10,571.95 days, or 29 years minus 20 days). Their appearance and longitude are irregular due to a lack of synchronization with the anomalistic month (period of perigee). However, groupings of 3 inex cycles (≈ 87 years minus 2 months) comes close (≈ 1,151.02 anomalistic months), so eclipses are similar in these groupings.

Series members between 1801 and 2069
November 18, 1808 (Saros 149)	October 29, 1837 (Saros 150)	October 8, 1866 (Saros 151)
September 18, 1895 (Saros 152)	August 30, 1924 (Saros 153)	August 9, 1953 (Saros 154)
July 20, 1982 (Saros 155)	July 1, 2011 (Saros 156)	
May 20, 2069 (Saros 158)		
