= Solar eclipse of October 26, 2087 =

Future partial solar eclipse

- Partial eclipse
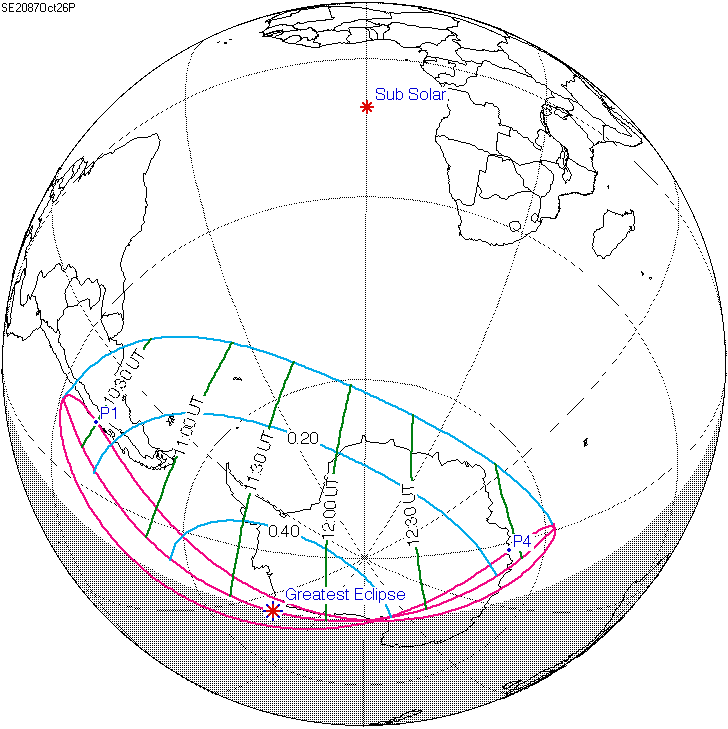
- Map
- Gamma: −1.2882
- Magnitude: 0.4696

Maximum eclipse
- Coordinates: 71°S 130.5°W

Times (UTC)
- Greatest eclipse: 11:46:57

References
- Saros: 125 (58 of 73)
- Catalog # (SE5000): 9705

A partial solar eclipse will occur at the Moon's ascending node of orbit on Sunday, October 26, 2087, with a magnitude of 0.4696. A solar eclipse occurs when the Moon passes between Earth and the Sun, thereby totally or partly obscuring the image of the Sun for a viewer on Earth. A partial solar eclipse occurs in the polar regions of the Earth when the center of the Moon's shadow misses the Earth.

The partial solar eclipse will be visible for parts of southern South America and Antarctica.

== Eclipse details ==
Shown below are two tables displaying details about this particular solar eclipse. The first table outlines times at which the Moon's penumbra or umbra attains the specific parameter, and the second table describes various other parameters pertaining to this eclipse.

October 26, 2087 Solar Eclipse Times
Event	Time (UTC)
First Penumbral External Contact	2087 October 26 at 10:00:50.1 UTC
Ecliptic Conjunction	2087 October 26 at 11:31:59.1 UTC
Greatest Eclipse	2087 October 26 at 11:46:56.7 UTC
Equatorial Conjunction	2087 October 26 at 12:25:49.5 UTC
Last Penumbral External Contact	2087 October 26 at 13:32:48.0 UTC

October 26, 2087 Solar Eclipse Parameters
Parameter	Value
Eclipse Magnitude	0.46962
Eclipse Obscuration	0.34848
Gamma	−1.28822
Sun Right Ascension	14h04m17.3s
Sun Declination	-12°36'18.7"
Sun Semi-Diameter	16'05.1"
Sun Equatorial Horizontal Parallax	08.8"
Moon Right Ascension	14h03m06.4s
Moon Declination	-13°43'47.4"
Moon Semi-Diameter	14'46.3"
Moon Equatorial Horizontal Parallax	0°54'12.8"
ΔT	112.1 s

== Eclipse season ==
This eclipse is part of an eclipse season, a period, roughly every six months, when eclipses occur. Only two (or occasionally three) eclipse seasons occur each year, and each season lasts about 35 days and repeats just short of six months (173 days) later; thus two full eclipse seasons always occur each year. Either two or three eclipses happen each eclipse season. In the sequence below, each eclipse is separated by a fortnight.

Eclipse season of October–November 2087
October 26 Ascending node (new moon)	November 10 Descending node (full moon)
Partial solar eclipse Solar Saros 125	Total lunar eclipse Lunar Saros 137

== Related eclipses ==
=== Eclipses in 2087 ===
- A partial solar eclipse on May 2.
- A total lunar eclipse on May 17.
- A partial solar eclipse on June 1.
- A partial solar eclipse on October 26.
- A total lunar eclipse on November 10.

=== Metonic ===
- Preceded by: Solar eclipse of January 7, 2084
- Followed by: Solar eclipse of August 15, 2091

=== Tzolkinex ===
- Preceded by: Solar eclipse of September 13, 2080
- Followed by: Solar eclipse of December 7, 2094

=== Half-Saros ===
- Preceded by: Lunar eclipse of October 21, 2078
- Followed by: Lunar eclipse of October 31, 2096

=== Tritos ===
- Preceded by: Solar eclipse of November 26, 2076
- Followed by: Solar eclipse of September 25, 2098

=== Solar Saros 125 ===
- Preceded by: Solar eclipse of October 15, 2069
- Followed by: Solar eclipse of November 6, 2105

=== Inex ===
- Preceded by: Solar eclipse of November 16, 2058
- Followed by: Solar eclipse of October 6, 2116

=== Triad ===
- Preceded by: Solar eclipse of December 25, 2000
- Followed by: Solar eclipse of August 27, 2174

=== Solar eclipses of 2087–2090 ===
This eclipse is a member of a semester series. An eclipse in a semester series of solar eclipses repeats approximately every 177 days and 4 hours (a semester) at alternating nodes of the Moon's orbit.

The partial solar eclipse on June 1, 2087 occurs in the previous lunar year eclipse set.

Solar eclipse series sets from 2087 to 2090
Descending node			Ascending node		
Saros	Map	Gamma	Saros	Map	Gamma
120	May 2, 2087 Partial	1.1139	125	October 26, 2087 Partial	−1.2882
130	April 21, 2088 Total	0.4135	135	October 14, 2088 Annular	−0.5349
140	April 10, 2089 Annular	−0.3319	145	October 4, 2089 Total	0.2167
150	March 31, 2090 Partial	−1.1028	155	September 23, 2090 Total	0.9157

=== Saros 125 ===
This eclipse is a part of Saros series 125, repeating every 18 years, 11 days, and containing 73 events. The series started with a partial solar eclipse on February 4, 1060. It contains total eclipses from June 13, 1276 through July 16, 1330; hybrid eclipses on July 26, 1348 and August 7, 1366; and annular eclipses from August 17, 1384 through August 22, 1979. The series ends at member 73 as a partial eclipse on April 9, 2358. Its eclipses are tabulated in three columns; every third eclipse in the same column is one exeligmos apart, so they all cast shadows over approximately the same parts of the Earth.

The longest duration of totality was produced by member 14 at 1 minutes, 11 seconds on June 25, 1294, and the longest duration of annularity was produced by member 48 at 7 minutes, 23 seconds on July 10, 1907. All eclipses in this series occur at the Moon’s ascending node of orbit.

Series members 43–64 occur between 1801 and 2200:
43	44	45
May 16, 1817	May 27, 1835	June 6, 1853
46	47	48
June 18, 1871	June 28, 1889	July 10, 1907
49	50	51
July 20, 1925	August 1, 1943	August 11, 1961
52	53	54
August 22, 1979	September 2, 1997	September 13, 2015
55	56	57
September 23, 2033	October 4, 2051	October 15, 2069
58	59	60
October 26, 2087	November 6, 2105	November 18, 2123
61	62	63
November 28, 2141	December 9, 2159	December 20, 2177
64
December 31, 2195

=== Metonic series ===
The metonic series repeats eclipses every 19 years (6939.69 days), lasting about 5 cycles. Eclipses occur in nearly the same calendar date. In addition, the octon subseries repeats 1/5 of that or every 3.8 years (1387.94 days). All eclipses in this table occur at the Moon's ascending node.

22 eclipse events between June 1, 2076 and October 27, 2163
June 1–3	March 21–22	January 7–8	October 26–27	August 14–15
119	121	123	125	127
June 1, 2076	March 21, 2080	January 7, 2084	October 26, 2087	August 15, 2091
129	131	133	135	137
June 2, 2095	March 21, 2099	January 8, 2103	October 26, 2106	August 15, 2110
139	141	143	145	147
June 3, 2114	March 22, 2118	January 8, 2122	October 26, 2125	August 15, 2129
149	151	153	155	157
June 3, 2133	March 21, 2137	January 8, 2141	October 26, 2144	August 14, 2148
159	161	163	165	
June 3, 2152			October 27, 2163	

=== Tritos series ===
This eclipse is a part of a tritos cycle, repeating at alternating nodes every 135 synodic months (≈ 3986.63 days, or 11 years minus 1 month). Their appearance and longitude are irregular due to a lack of synchronization with the anomalistic month (period of perigee), but groupings of 3 tritos cycles (≈ 33 years minus 3 months) come close (≈ 434.044 anomalistic months), so eclipses are similar in these groupings.

The partial solar eclipses on April 8, 1902 (part of Saros 108) and January 5, 1935 (part of Saros 111) are also a part of this series but are not included in the table below.

Series members between 2000 and 2200
July 1, 2000 (Saros 117)	June 1, 2011 (Saros 118)	April 30, 2022 (Saros 119)	March 30, 2033 (Saros 120)	February 28, 2044 (Saros 121)
January 27, 2055 (Saros 122)	December 27, 2065 (Saros 123)	November 26, 2076 (Saros 124)	October 26, 2087 (Saros 125)	September 25, 2098 (Saros 126)
August 26, 2109 (Saros 127)	July 25, 2120 (Saros 128)	June 25, 2131 (Saros 129)	May 25, 2142 (Saros 130)	April 23, 2153 (Saros 131)
March 23, 2164 (Saros 132)	February 21, 2175 (Saros 133)	January 20, 2186 (Saros 134)	December 19, 2196 (Saros 135)	

=== Inex series ===
This eclipse is a part of the long period inex cycle, repeating at alternating nodes, every 358 synodic months (≈ 10,571.95 days, or 29 years minus 20 days). Their appearance and longitude are irregular due to a lack of synchronization with the anomalistic month (period of perigee). However, groupings of 3 inex cycles (≈ 87 years minus 2 months) comes close (≈ 1,151.02 anomalistic months), so eclipses are similar in these groupings.

Series members between 1801 and 2200
April 26, 1827 (Saros 116)	April 5, 1856 (Saros 117)	March 16, 1885 (Saros 118)
February 25, 1914 (Saros 119)	February 4, 1943 (Saros 120)	January 16, 1972 (Saros 121)
December 25, 2000 (Saros 122)	December 5, 2029 (Saros 123)	November 16, 2058 (Saros 124)
October 26, 2087 (Saros 125)	October 6, 2116 (Saros 126)	September 16, 2145 (Saros 127)
August 27, 2174 (Saros 128)		
