= Solar eclipse of June 1, 2087 =

Future partial solar eclipse

- Partial eclipse
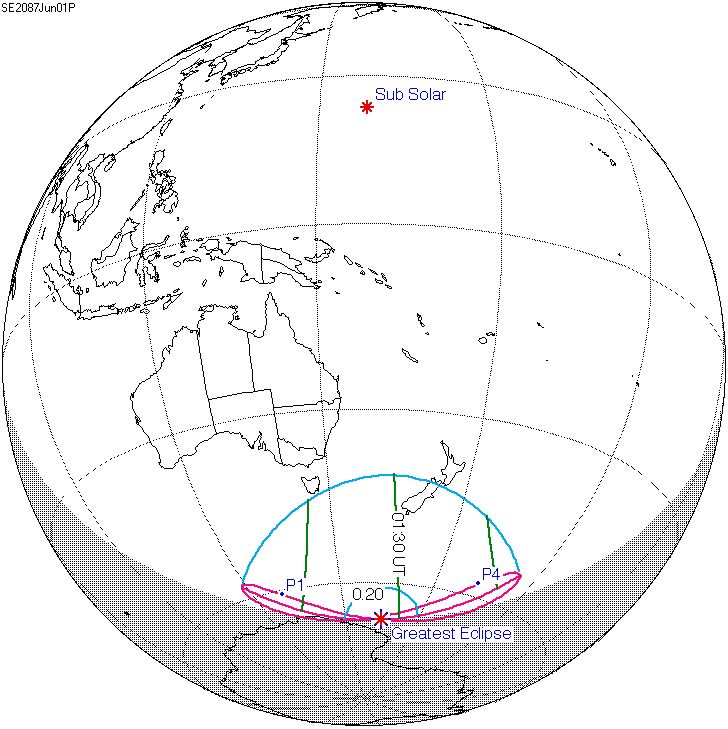
- Map
- Gamma: −1.4186
- Magnitude: 0.2146

Maximum eclipse
- Coordinates: 67.8°S 165.4°E

Times (UTC)
- Greatest eclipse: 1:27:14

References
- Saros: 158 (2 of 70)
- Catalog # (SE5000): 9703

A partial solar eclipse will occur at the Moon's descending node of orbit on Sunday, June 1, 2087, with a magnitude of 0.2146. A solar eclipse occurs when the Moon passes between Earth and the Sun, thereby totally or partly obscuring the image of the Sun for a viewer on Earth. A partial solar eclipse occurs in the polar regions of the Earth when the center of the Moon's shadow misses the Earth.

The partial solar eclipse will be visible for parts of New Zealand.

== Eclipse details ==
Shown below are two tables displaying details about this particular solar eclipse. The first table outlines times at which the Moon's penumbra or umbra attains the specific parameter, and the second table describes various other parameters pertaining to this eclipse.

June 1, 2087 Solar Eclipse Times
Event	Time (UTC)
First Penumbral External Contact	2087 June 1 at 00:27:40.4 UTC
Equatorial Conjunction	2087 June 1 at 01:20:27.8 UTC
Greatest Eclipse	2087 June 1 at 01:27:14.3 UTC
Ecliptic Conjunction	2087 June 1 at 01:41:17.3 UTC
Last Penumbral External Contact	2087 June 1 at 02:26:53.3 UTC

June 1, 2087 Solar Eclipse Parameters
Parameter	Value
Eclipse Magnitude	0.21464
Eclipse Obscuration	0.11694
Gamma	−1.41856
Sun Right Ascension	04h37m04.0s
Sun Declination	+22°03'32.2"
Sun Semi-Diameter	15'46.5"
Sun Equatorial Horizontal Parallax	08.7"
Moon Right Ascension	04h37m20.9s
Moon Declination	+20°37'32.1"
Moon Semi-Diameter	16'34.5"
Moon Equatorial Horizontal Parallax	1°00'49.8"
ΔT	111.8 s

== Eclipse season ==
This eclipse is part of an eclipse season, a period, roughly every six months, when eclipses occur. Only two (or occasionally three) eclipse seasons occur each year, and each season lasts about 35 days and repeats just short of six months (173 days) later; thus two full eclipse seasons always occur each year. Either two or three eclipses happen each eclipse season. In the sequence below, each eclipse is separated by a fortnight. The first and last eclipse in this sequence is separated by one synodic month.

Eclipse season of May–June 2087
May 2 Descending node (new moon)	May 17 Ascending node (full moon)	June 1 Descending node (new moon)
Partial solar eclipse Solar Saros 120	Total lunar eclipse Lunar Saros 132	Partial solar eclipse Solar Saros 158

== Related eclipses ==
=== Eclipses in 2087 ===
- A partial solar eclipse on May 2.
- A total lunar eclipse on May 17.
- A partial solar eclipse on June 1.
- A partial solar eclipse on October 26.
- A total lunar eclipse on November 10.

=== Metonic ===
- Preceded by: Solar eclipse of August 13, 2083

=== Tzolkinex ===
- Followed by: Solar eclipse of July 12, 2094

=== Half-Saros ===
- Followed by: Lunar eclipse of June 6, 2096

=== Tritos ===
- Preceded by: Solar eclipse of July 1, 2076

=== Solar Saros 158 ===
- Preceded by: Solar eclipse of May 20, 2069
- Followed by: Solar eclipse of June 12, 2105

=== Inex ===
- Preceded by: Solar eclipse of June 21, 2058

=== Triad ===
- Preceded by: Solar eclipse of July 31, 2000
- Followed by: Solar eclipse of April 1, 2174

=== Solar eclipses of 2083–2087 ===
This eclipse is a member of a semester series. An eclipse in a semester series of solar eclipses repeats approximately every 177 days and 4 hours (a semester) at alternating nodes of the Moon's orbit.

The partial solar eclipses on February 16, 2083 and August 13, 2083 occur in the previous lunar year eclipse set, and the partial solar eclipses on May 2, 2087 and October 26, 2087 occur in the next lunar year eclipse set.

Solar eclipse series sets from 2083 to 2087
Descending node			Ascending node		
Saros	Map	Gamma	Saros	Map	Gamma
118	July 15, 2083 Partial	1.5465	123	January 7, 2084 Partial	−1.0715
128	July 3, 2084 Annular	0.8208	133	December 27, 2084 Total	−0.4094
138	June 22, 2085 Annular	0.0452	143	December 16, 2085 Annular	0.2786
148	June 11, 2086 Total	−0.7215	153	December 6, 2086 Partial	1.0194
158	June 1, 2087 Partial	−1.4186			

=== Saros 158 ===
This eclipse is a part of Saros series 158, repeating every 18 years, 11 days, and containing 70 events. The series will start with a partial solar eclipse on May 20, 2069. It contains total eclipses from August 5, 2195 through August 13, 2808; hybrid eclipses on August 24, 2826 and September 3, 2844; and annular eclipses from September 15, 2862 through February 27, 3133. The series ends at member 70 as a partial eclipse on June 16, 3313. Its eclipses are tabulated in three columns; every third eclipse in the same column is one exeligmos apart, so they all cast shadows over approximately the same parts of the Earth.

The longest duration of totality will be produced by member 10 at 4 minutes, 43 seconds on August 28, 2231, and the longest duration of annularity will be produced by member 57 at 6 minutes, 7 seconds on January 25, 3079. All eclipses in this series occur at the Moon’s descending node of orbit.

Series members 1–8 occur between 2069 and 2200:
1	2	3
May 20, 2069	June 1, 2087	June 12, 2105
4	5	6
June 23, 2123	July 3, 2141	July 15, 2159
7	8	
July 25, 2177	August 5, 2195	

=== Metonic series ===
The metonic series repeats eclipses every 19 years (6939.69 days), lasting about 5 cycles. Eclipses occur in nearly the same calendar date. In addition, the octon subseries repeats 1/5 of that or every 3.8 years (1387.94 days). All eclipses in this table occur at the Moon's descending node.

22 eclipse events between June 1, 2011 and October 24, 2098
May 31–June 1	March 19–20	January 5–6	October 24–25	August 12–13
118	120	122	124	126
June 1, 2011	March 20, 2015	January 6, 2019	October 25, 2022	August 12, 2026
128	130	132	134	136
June 1, 2030	March 20, 2034	January 5, 2038	October 25, 2041	August 12, 2045
138	140	142	144	146
May 31, 2049	March 20, 2053	January 5, 2057	October 24, 2060	August 12, 2064
148	150	152	154	156
May 31, 2068	March 19, 2072	January 6, 2076	October 24, 2079	August 13, 2083
158	160	162	164	
June 1, 2087			October 24, 2098	

=== Tritos series ===
This eclipse is a part of a tritos cycle, repeating at alternating nodes every 135 synodic months (≈ 3986.63 days, or 11 years minus 1 month). Their appearance and longitude are irregular due to a lack of synchronization with the anomalistic month (period of perigee), but groupings of 3 tritos cycles (≈ 33 years minus 3 months) come close (≈ 434.044 anomalistic months), so eclipses are similar in these groupings.

Series members between 1801 and 2087
August 17, 1803 (Saros 132)	July 17, 1814 (Saros 133)	June 16, 1825 (Saros 134)	May 15, 1836 (Saros 135)	April 15, 1847 (Saros 136)
March 15, 1858 (Saros 137)	February 11, 1869 (Saros 138)	January 11, 1880 (Saros 139)	December 12, 1890 (Saros 140)	November 11, 1901 (Saros 141)
October 10, 1912 (Saros 142)	September 10, 1923 (Saros 143)	August 10, 1934 (Saros 144)	July 9, 1945 (Saros 145)	June 8, 1956 (Saros 146)
May 9, 1967 (Saros 147)	April 7, 1978 (Saros 148)	March 7, 1989 (Saros 149)	February 5, 2000 (Saros 150)	January 4, 2011 (Saros 151)
December 4, 2021 (Saros 152)	November 3, 2032 (Saros 153)	October 3, 2043 (Saros 154)	September 2, 2054 (Saros 155)	August 2, 2065 (Saros 156)
July 1, 2076 (Saros 157)	June 1, 2087 (Saros 158)			

=== Inex series ===
This eclipse is a part of the long period inex cycle, repeating at alternating nodes, every 358 synodic months (≈ 10,571.95 days, or 29 years minus 20 days). Their appearance and longitude are irregular due to a lack of synchronization with the anomalistic month (period of perigee). However, groupings of 3 inex cycles (≈ 87 years minus 2 months) comes close (≈ 1,151.02 anomalistic months), so eclipses are similar in these groupings.

Series members between 1801 and 2200
November 29, 1826 (Saros 149)	November 9, 1855 (Saros 150)	October 19, 1884 (Saros 151)
September 30, 1913 (Saros 152)	September 10, 1942 (Saros 153)	August 20, 1971 (Saros 154)
July 31, 2000 (Saros 155)	July 11, 2029 (Saros 156)	June 21, 2058 (Saros 157)
June 1, 2087 (Saros 158)		
April 1, 2174 (Saros 161)		
